= Paris in the 18th century =

Paris in the 18th century was the second-largest city in Europe after London, with a population of about 600,000 people. The century saw the construction of Place Vendôme, the Place de la Concorde, the Champs-Élysées, the church of Les Invalides, and the Panthéon, and the founding of the Louvre Museum. Paris witnessed the end of the reign of Louis XIV, was the centre stage of the Enlightenment and the French Revolution, saw the first manned flight, and was the birthplace of high fashion and the modern restaurant and bistro.

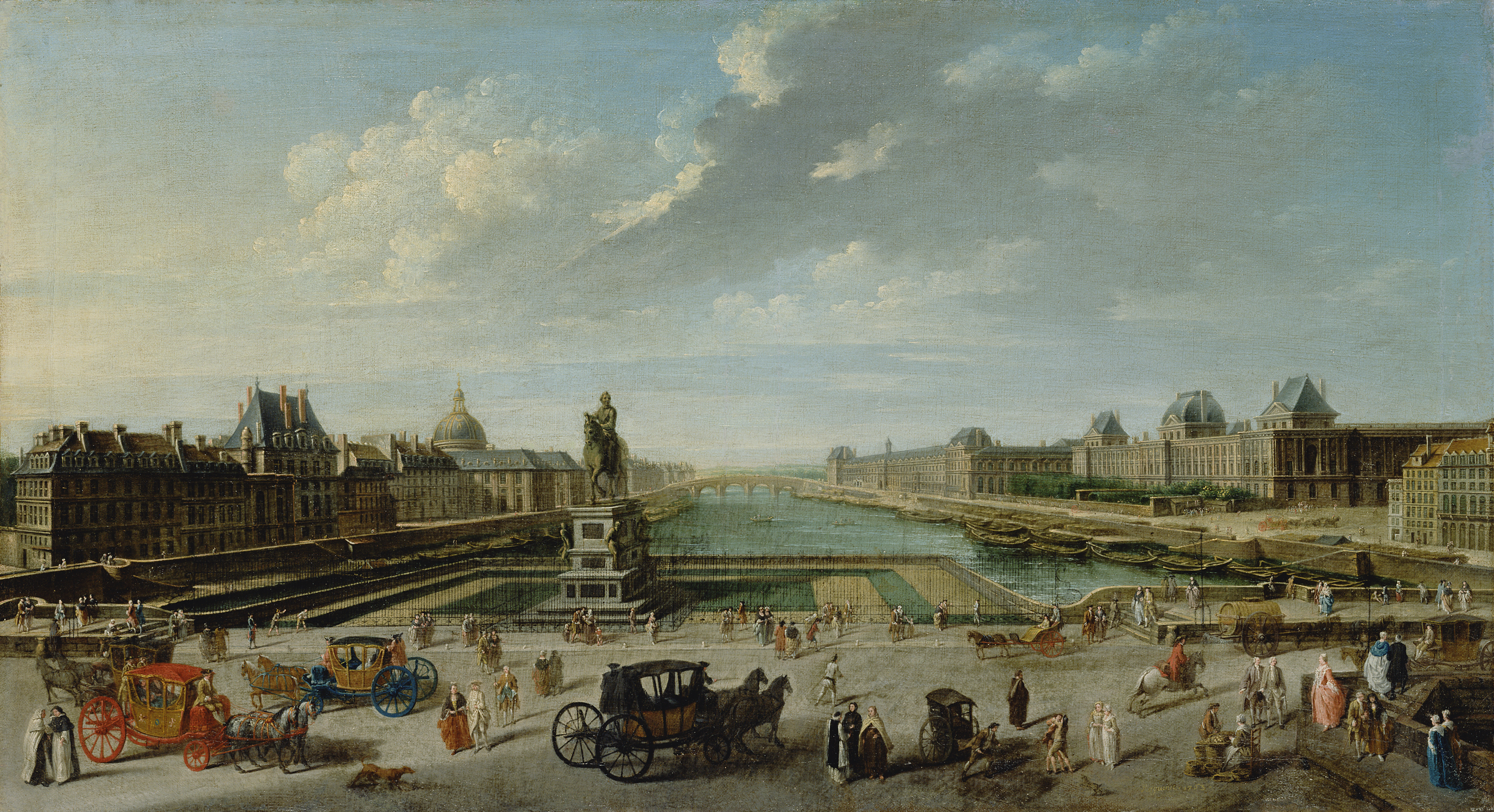
View of Paris from the Pont Neuf (1763)

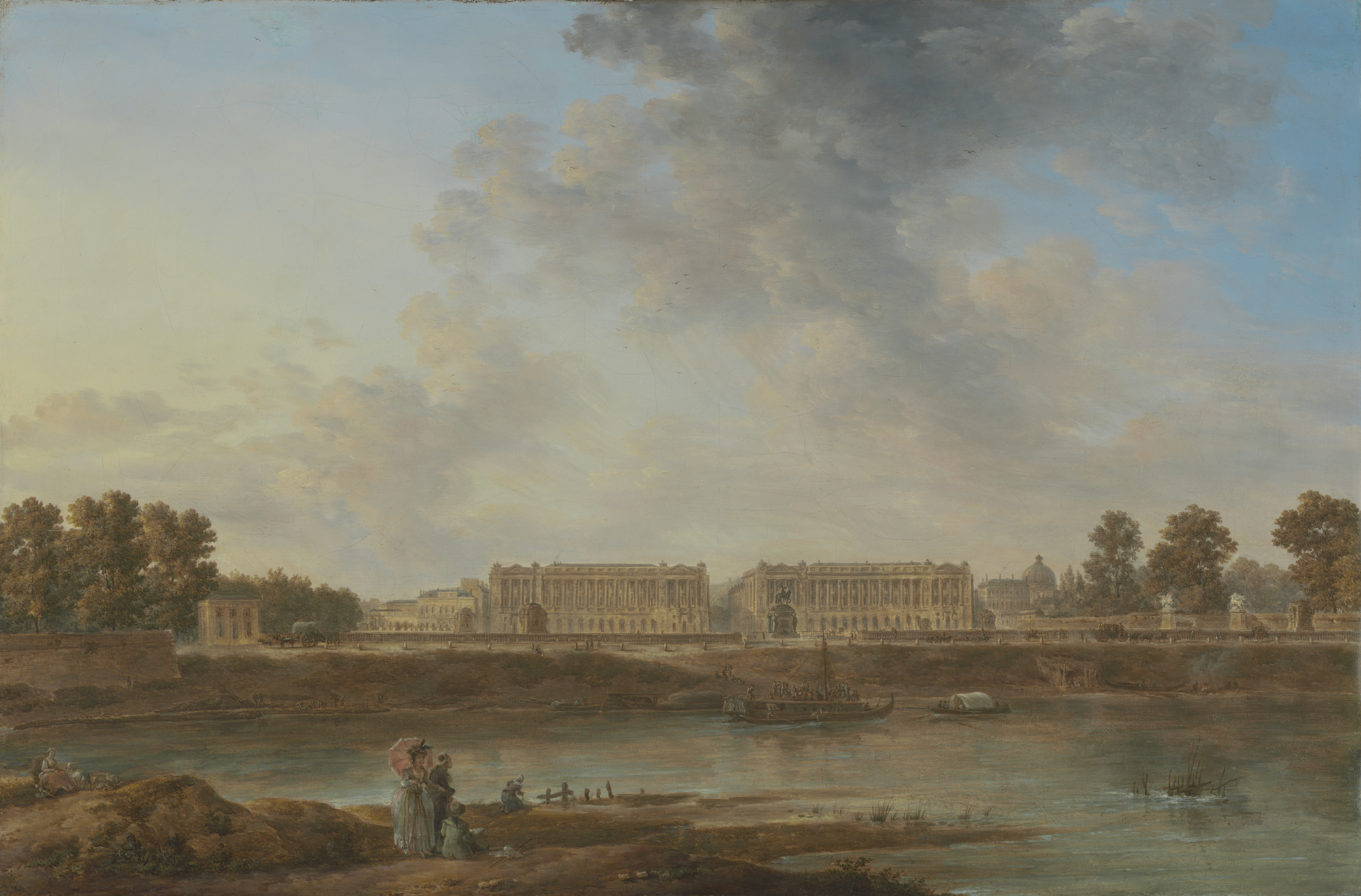
View of Place Louis XV (now Place de la Concorde) from the Left Bank, attributed to Alexandre-Jean Noël (about 1780)

== Paris at the end of the reign of Louis XIV ==
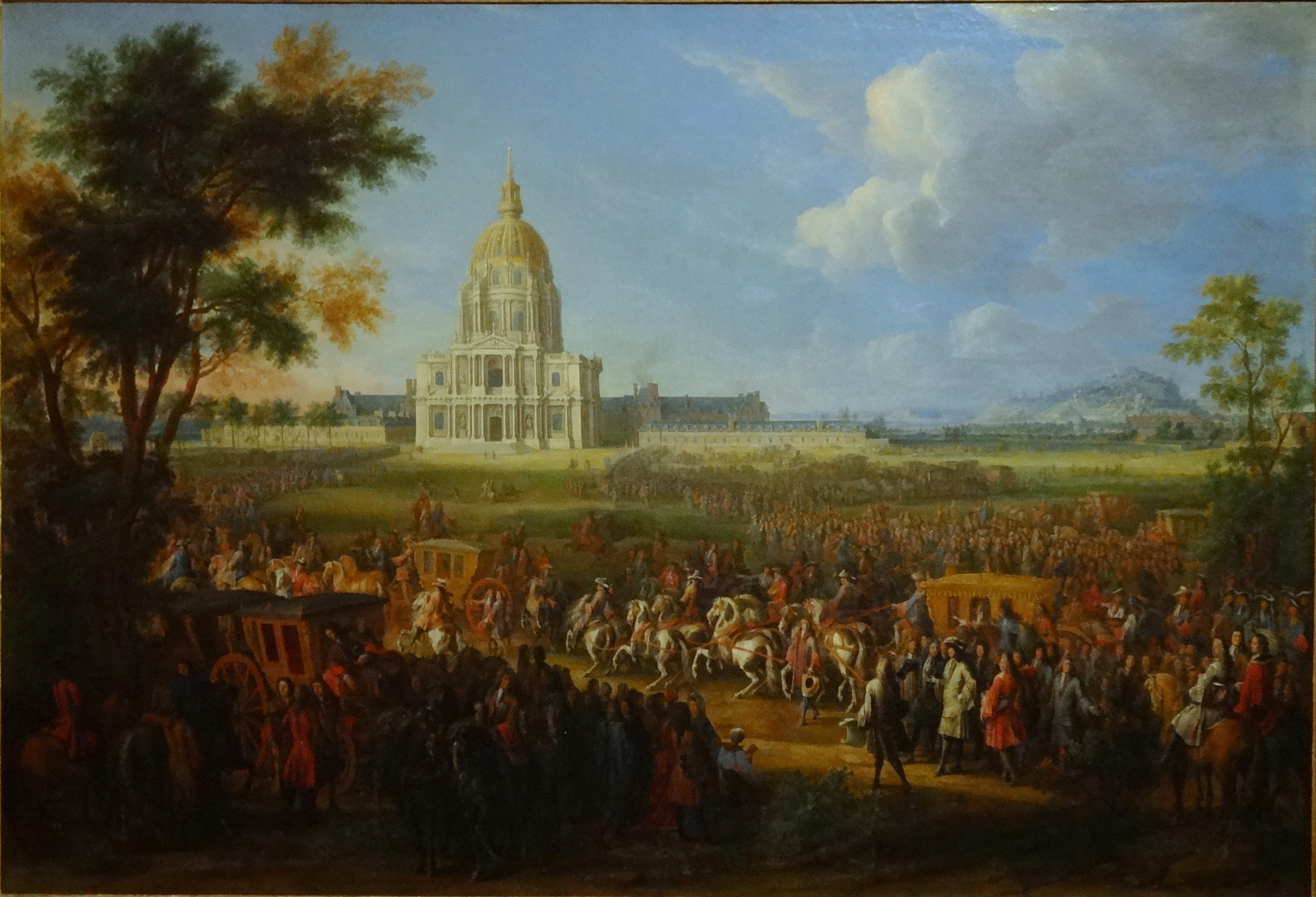
Louis XIV makes his last visit to Paris to see the new dome of Les Invalides (1706)

=== "The new Rome" ===
Louis XIV distrusted the Parisians; when he was young he had been forced to flee the city twice, and he did not forget it. He moved his residence from the Tuileries Palace to the Palace of Versailles in 1671, and moved his entire court to Versailles in 1682. But while he disliked the Parisians, he wanted Paris to be a monument to his glory; he declared in 1666 that he wished to "do for Paris what Augustus had done for Rome." He decorated the city with new squares and public buildings; the Collège des Quatre-Nations (1662–1672); the Pont Royal in 1685, and in the same year began construction of two new monumental squares: Place des Victoires and Place Louis le Grand (now Place Vendôme). He also began the Hôtel des Invalides (1671–1678), a residence and hospital for wounded soldiers. In 1699, a monumental equestrian statue of the King was dedicated in the center of the place Vendôme. During his reign, Louis XIV spent more than 200 million livres for new buildings, of which ten percent was spent in Paris; ten million for rebuilding the Louvre and the Tuileries; 3.5 million for the new factories of Gobelins and the Savonnerie; and a little more than 2 million for Les Invalides.

Several new churches were also begun during the reign of Louis XIV, but not finished until well into the 18th century; these included the Church of Saint-Sulpice, whose cornerstone was laid by the Queen, Anne of Austria, in 1646, but not finished until 1745; the Church of Saint-Roch, begun in 1653 and finished in 1740; the church of Saint-Nicolas-du-Chardonnet (1656–1765); and the church of Saint-Thomas-d'Aquin (1683–1770).

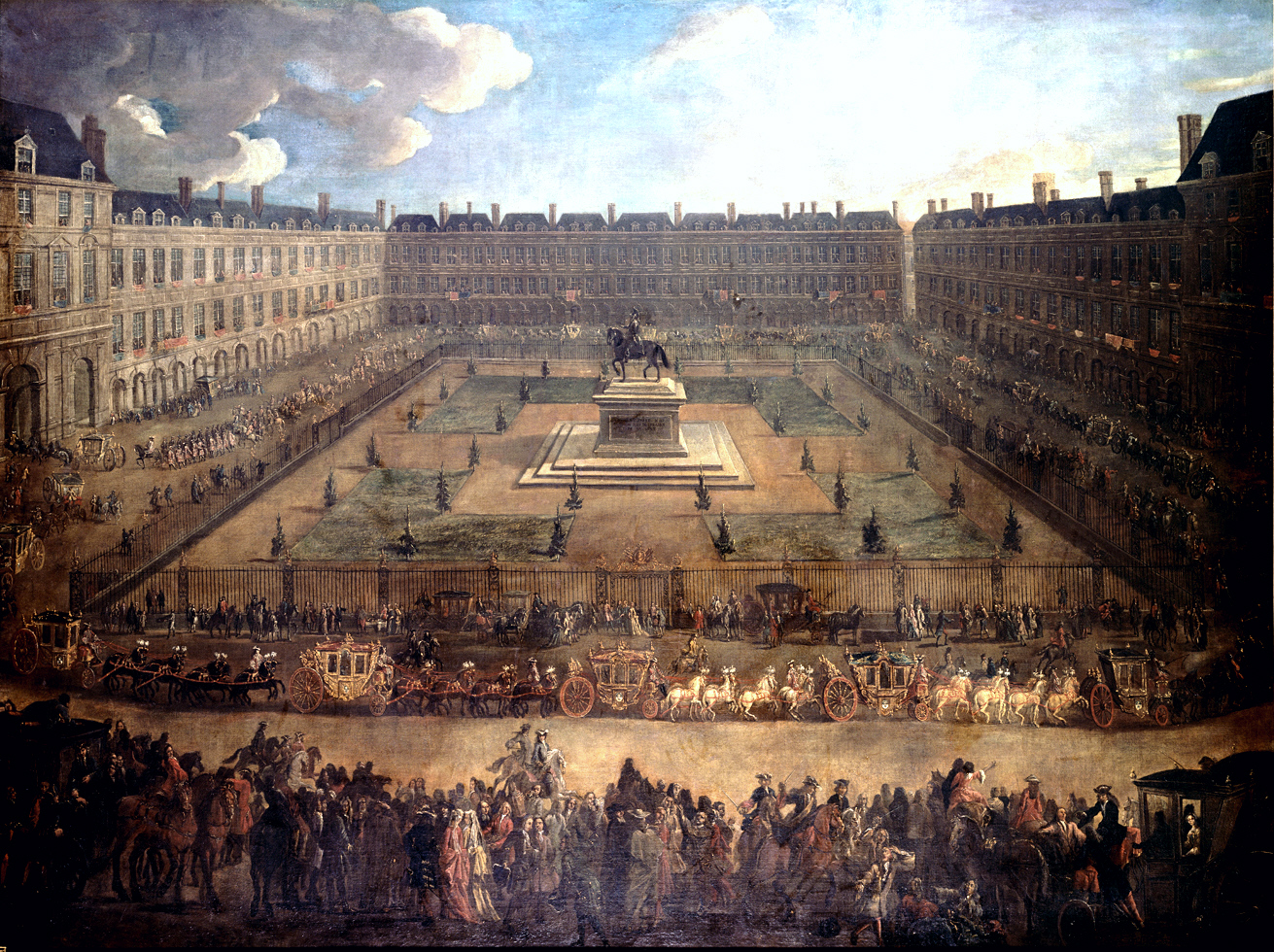
Place Royale, now Place des Vosges, in 1709. The square was a fashionable area until the French Revolution, though most of the nobility have left beyond Saint-Germain des Pres during the early 18th century.

Louis XIV also made a dramatic change to the borders of the city; he decided that Paris was now secure from any enemy attack, and had the old ring of walls and fortifications demolished. The old city gates were replaced by ceremonial arches, celebrating his victories; the Porte Saint-Denis (1672) and Porte Saint-Martin (1674). The walls were pulled down and replaced by wide boulevards, which in the 18th century became the most popular promenades for Parisians.

The administration of the city was complicated and deliberately divided, designed to keep the city tightly under royal authority. The position of Governor of Paris, held by a duke, was purely ceremonial, as was the position of the Provost of Paris, earlier held by a leading merchant, but in the early 18th century by a nobleman. Their powers were shared with the Intendant of Paris, a high noble with rather vague duties, the Bureau of the City, the Procureur-General of the Parliament, the Civil Lieutenant of the Châtelet, and the Secretary of State of the King's Household, who had the title "Minister of Paris", but reported to the Controller General of Finances. The position of Lieutenant-General of Police of Paris was created in 1667, and given to Gabriel Nicolas de la Reynie, the first police chief of the city, and he became a sort of Vice-Minister. All of these officials were responsible for some part of the city's business, but all important decisions had to be made by the King and his council.

Despite the grandeur of the new monuments, the center of the city at the beginning of the 18th century was overcrowded, dark, unhealthy, and had little light, air, or drinking water. It was also dangerous, despite the addition of the first metal lanterns on the main streets and the enlargement of the police night watch to four hundred men.

The last years of the King's long reign were marked by natural catastrophes which caused great suffering for the Parisians; they began with a bad harvest followed by a famine in the winter of 1692-1693. Dozens of large ovens were built in the courtyard of the Louvre to bake bread for the poor, but the distribution of the loaves at central points around the city resulted in fighting and riots. That winter, fourteen or fifteen people a day died of hunger at the Hôtel Dieu hospital next to the Cathedral of Notre-Dame. Another bad harvest and severe winter hit Paris in 1708–1709, with temperatures reaching below 20 degrees Celsius. The Seine froze from January 26 until April 5, making it impossible to deliver grain to the city by boat. During the summer of 1709, the government announced the creation of workshops for the poor and unemployed, who would receive 1.5 pounds of bread and two sous for each day of work. Six thousand persons lined up before dawn near the Porte Saint-Martin for two thousand available jobs. Riots followed, the crowds attacked Les Halles, and musketeers had to occupy the main streets and squares to restore order. Placards criticizing the King and his government began to appear on the city gates, the churches and the main squares.

On 28 August 1706 Louis XIV made his last visit to Paris to see the construction of the new chapel, with a great gilded dome, he was building for the Hôtel des Invalides. He died on 1 September 1715. Louis de Rouvroy, the Duke of Saint-Simon wrote in his memoirs that, at the news of the King's death, "the people, ruined, crippled, desperate, gave thanks to God."

== Paris under Louis XV ==
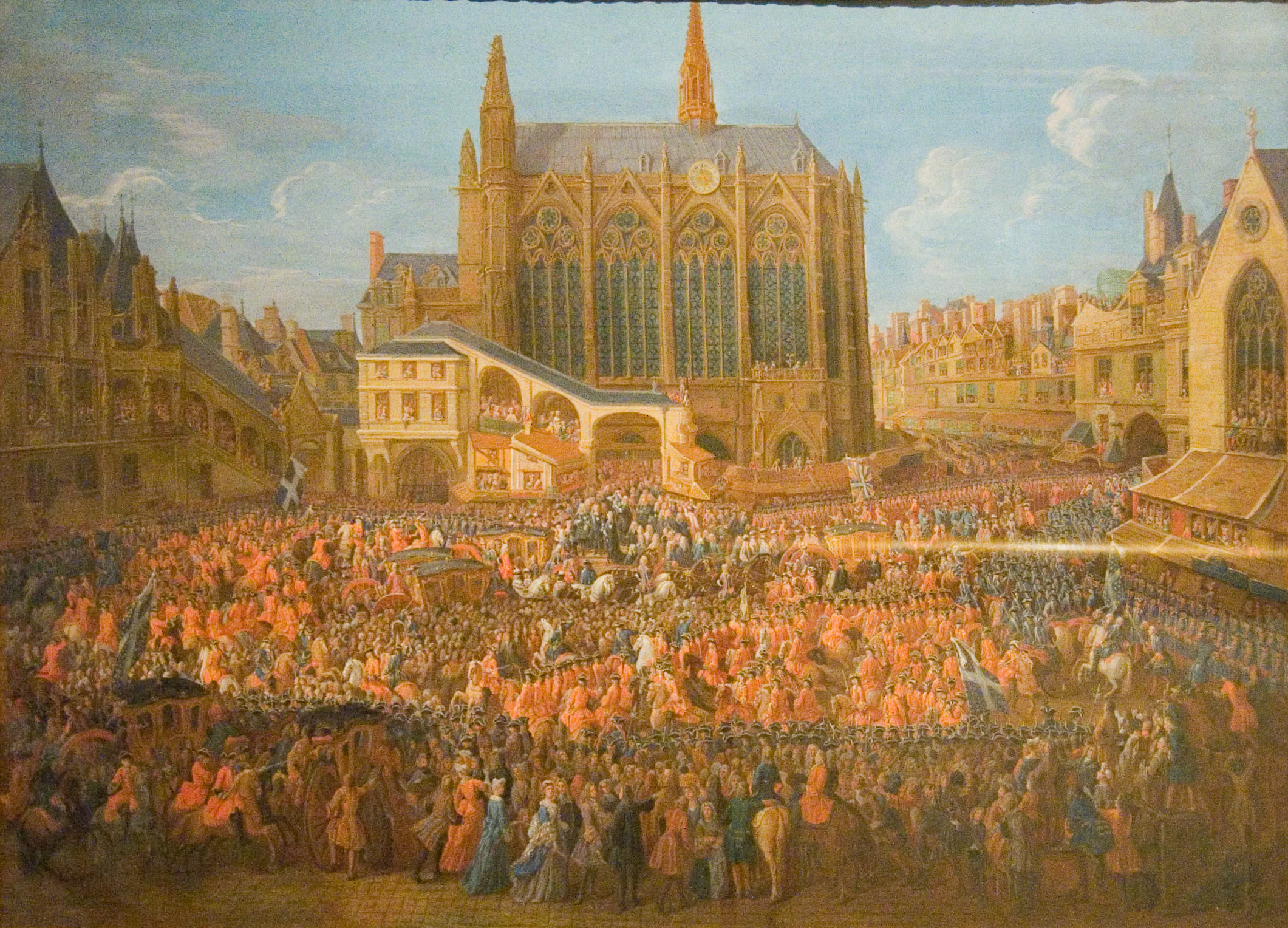
Louis XV, five years old and the new King, makes a grand exit from the Royal Palace on the Île de la Cité (1715).

Immediately following the death of Louis XIV, his nephew, Philippe d'Orléans, manoeuvered the Parlement into breaking the King's will and naming him the Regent for the five-year-old king Louis XV. On 12 September, the Regent had the child King brought to the Palais de Justice to ratify his Regency, and then to the Château de Vincennes. On 30 December, the young King was installed in the Tuileries Palace, while the Regent took up residence in his family's palace, the Palais Royal, the former Palais-Cardinal of Cardinal Richelieu.

Under the Regent, the pleasures and amusements forbidden in Paris during the last years of Louis XIV were resumed. The Comédie-Italienne theatre company had been banned from Paris in 1697 for presenting a thinly disguised satire about the King's wife, Madame de Maintenon, called La Fausse Prude. The Regent invited the company back and that they perform at the Palais-Royal on 18 May 1716. The company moved to their own stage, the Théâtre-Italien in the Hôtel de Bourgogne, where they performed in his presence on 1 June 1716. In November 1716, the pleasure-loving Regent brought back another Paris amusement, the masked balls; these were held three times a week at the opera hall of the Palais-Royal. Masks were obligatory; a high admission charge of four livres kept out undesirable guests.

The young King was educated in Paris under the guidance of the Regent. He played on the terrace of the Tuileries Garden, had his own private zoo, and a room filled with scientific instruments telescopes, microscopes, compasses, mirrors, and models of the planets, where he was instructed by members of the Academy of Sciences. A printing press was installed in the palace for him to learn typography. He was taken hunting in the Bois de Boulogne and the Bois de Vincennes. In 1720, and 1721, when he was just ten, the young King himself danced before for the court and public in ballet performances in the Salle des Machines of the Tuileries Palace.

The Regent also made an important contribution to the intellectual life of Paris. In 1719, he moved the Royal library to the Hôtel de Nevers near the Palais-Royal, where it eventually became the Bibliothèque nationale de France (National Library of France). The king and government remained in Paris for seven years.

=== Monuments ===
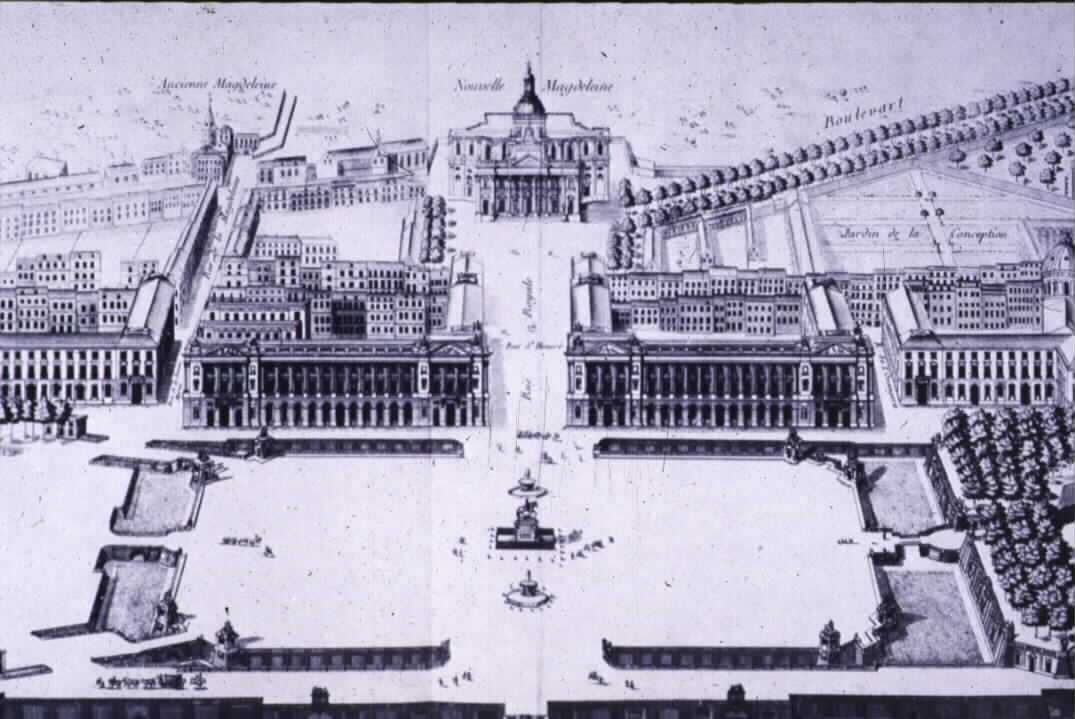
Design of Ange-Jacques Gabriel for Place Louis XV, now the Place de la Concorde

In 1722, Louis XV returned the court to Versailles, and visited the city only on special occasions. While he rarely came into Paris, he did make important additions to the city's landmarks. His first major building was the École Militaire, a new military school, on the Left Bank. Work began in 1753 and was completed in 1760, when the King first visited it. A chapel for the school was begun in 1768, and finished in 1773.

Louis XIV had promised to build a new church dedicated to Saint Genevieve, but it had never gotten underway. Louis XV laid the first stone for the new church on 6 September 1764. For the opening, a temporary portico of light materials was erected, to show what the church would look like. It was not completed until 1790, at the time of the French Revolution of 1789, when it became the Panthéon.

In 1748, the Academy of Arts commissioned a monumental statue of the king on horseback by the sculptor Bouchardon, and the Academy of Architecture was assigned to create a square, to be called Place Louis XV, where it could be erected. The site selected was the marshy open space between the Seine, the moat and bridge to the Tuileries garden, and the Champs-Élysées, which led to the Étoile, convergence of hunting trails on the western edge of the city (now Place Charles de Gaulle-Étoile). The winning plans for the square and buildings next to it were drawn by the architect Ange-Jacques Gabriel. Gabriel designed two large mansions with a street between them, Rue Royale, designed to give a clear view of the statue in the centre of the square. Construction began in 1754, and the statue was put in place and dedicated on 23 February 1763. The two large mansions were still unfinished, but the façades were finished in 1765-66.

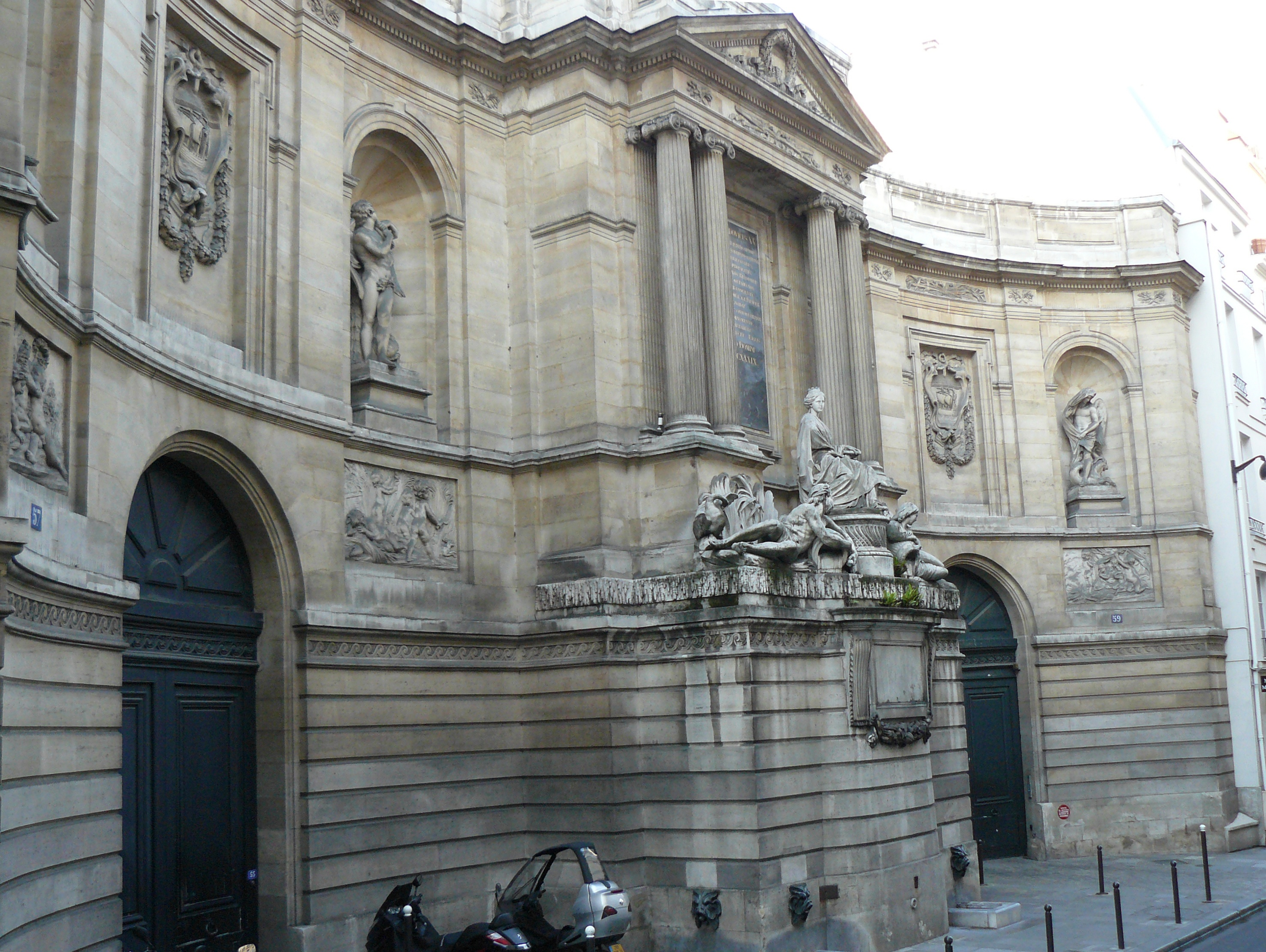
The Fontaine des Quatre-Saisons (1739–1745) was monumental, but originally had only two small water spouts for filling containers

The other monumental major building projects of Louis XV were all on the Left Bank: a new mint, the Hôtel des Monnaies, with a 117-metre façade along the Seine (1767–1775); a new medical school, the École de Chirurgie, designed by Jacques Gondouin (1771–1775), and a new theater for the Comédie Française, called the Théâtre de l'Odéon, designed by the architects Charles de Wailly and Marie-Joseph Peyre, which was begun in 1770, but not finished until 1774.

In addition to classical buildings, Louis XV constructed a monumental fountain, the Fontaine des Quatre-Saisons, richly decorated with classical sculpture by the Bouchardon glorifying the King, at 57-59 rue de la Grenelle. While the fountain was huge, and dominated the narrow street, it originally had only two small spouts, from which residents of the neighborhood could fill their water containers. It was criticized by Voltaire in a letter to the Count de Caylus in 1739, as the fountain was still under construction:

I have no doubt that Bouchardon will make of this fountain a fine piece of architecture; but what kind of fountain has only two faucets where the water porters will come to fill their buckets? This isn't the way fountains are built in Rome to beautify the city. We need to lift ourselves out of taste that is gross and shabby. Fountains should be built in public places, and viewed from all the gates. There isn't a single public place in the vast faubourg Saint-Germain; that makes my blood boil. Paris is like the statue of Nabuchodonosor, partly made of gold and partly made of muck.

== The Parisians ==
There was no official census of the Parisians before 1801, but based on parish records and other sources, most historians estimate that the population of Paris was about 500,000 persons at the beginning of the 18th century and grew to between 600,000 and 650,000 shortly before the Revolution of 1789. Following the Reign of Terror, economic hardship and the emigration of the nobility, the 1801 census reported that the population had dropped to 546,856, but it quickly recovered to reach 622,636 in 1811. It was no longer the largest city in Europe; London passed it in population in about 1700, but it was by far the largest city in France, and throughout the 18th century grew at a rapid rate, largely by an immigration from the Paris basin and from the north and east of France. The centre of the city became more and more crowded; building lots became smaller and buildings taller, to four, five and even six stories. In 1784, the height of buildings was finally limited to nine toises, or about eighteen metres.

=== The nobles ===
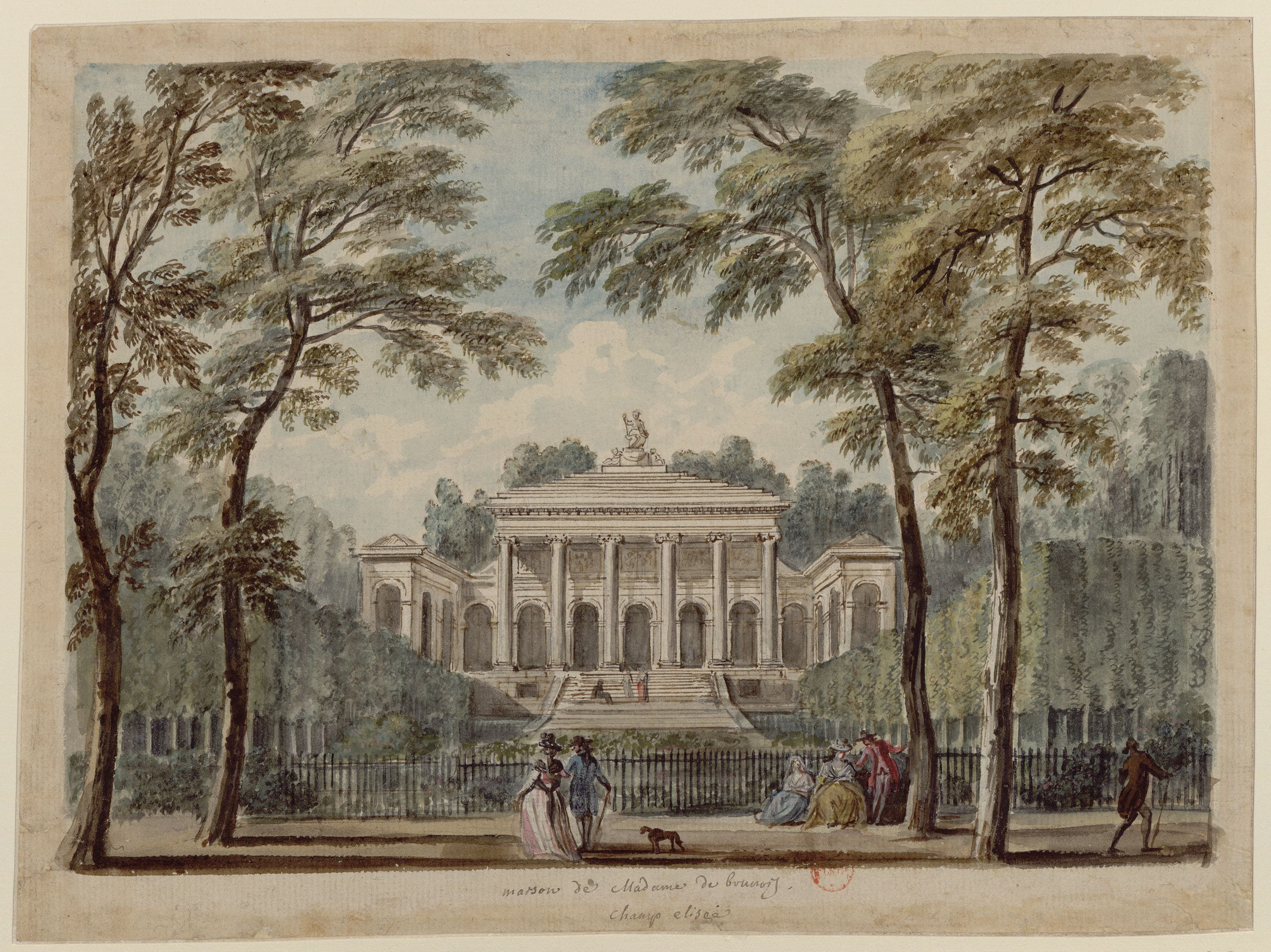
The Hotel de Brunoy, the town house of the Duke de Brunoy on the rue de Faubourg Saint-Honoré, seen from the Champs-Élysées (1779)

Until the 1789 Revolution, Paris had a strict social hierarchy, whose customs and rules were established by long tradition. It was described by Louis-Sébastien Mercier in the Le Tableau de Paris, written in 1783: "There are in Paris eight distinct classes; the princes and great nobles (these are the least numerous); the Nobles of the Robe; the financiers; the traders and merchants; the artists; the craftsmen; the manual workers; the servants; and the bas peuple (lower class)."

The nobility, including the upper levels of the clergy, who were closely connected to this class by family ties, numbered only about three or four percent of the population; their number was estimated by modern historians at about twenty thousand men, women, and children. At the very top of the nobility were the Dukes and Pairs, numbering about forty families, including that of the duc d'Orléans, who spent two million livres a year, and owned the Palais-Royal. Below them were about a hundred families with incomes between 10,000 and 50,000 livres a year, including many high-ranking military men, magistrates, and financiers. The old nobility received their income from their estates, while newer nobles depended upon payments they received from the royal government in Versailles for various government positions and titles they held.

The nobility had greatly expanded under Louis XIV, who liberally awarded or sold titles to men who had served the royal government. By 1726, two-thirds of the members of the Estates-General, who largely lived in Paris, had acquired or were in the process of acquiring noble status. The playwright Beaumarchais, the son of a watchmaker, was able to buy a title. Wealthy merchants and financiers were often able to obtain noble status for their families by marrying daughters to members of the old nobility.

Nobles who went into military service automatically received high ranks because of their status; they entered the service at the age of fifteen or sixteen, and, if they were well connected, could expect to command a regiment by the time they were only twenty-five. The children of the nobility attended the most select schools in Paris; the Collège de Clermont, and especially the Jesuit college of Louis-le-Grand. In addition to their academic courses, they were taught fencing and horsemanship.

At the beginning of the 18th century, most of the noble families had their large hôtels particuliers, or town houses, in the Marais neighborhood, but over the course of the century they moved to the neighborhoods of the Faubourg Saint-Honoré, near the Palais Royal, and especially to the left bank, to the new Faubourg Saint-Germain or north-west to the Luxembourg Palace. By 1750, only about ten percent of noble families still resided in the Marais.

By 1763, the Faubourg Saint-Germain had replaced the Marais as the most fashionable residential neighborhood for the aristocracy and the wealthy, but the Marais never completely lost all of its nobility, and always remained fashionable until the French Revolution in 1789. They built magnificent private residences there, in the Faubourg, many of which later became government residences or institutions; the Hôtel d'Évreux (1718–1720) later became the Élysée Palace, the residence of the Presidents of the Republic; the Hôtel Matignon became the residence of the Prime Minister; the Palais Bourbon became the home of the National Assembly; the Hôtel Salm became the Palais de la Légion d'Honneur, and the Hôtel de Biron eventually became the Rodin Museum.

=== The wealthy and the middle class ===
The bourgeois, or members of the middle class of Paris, financiers, merchants, shopkeepers, artisans, and those in the liberal professions (doctors, lawyers, accountants, teachers, government officials) were a growing social class. They were specifically defined by law as persons who had lived in the city for at least a year in their own residence, and had sufficient income to pay taxes. In 1780, there were an estimated 25,000 Paris households that fell into this category, about fourteen percent of the total. Many of those in the upper middle class rose from modest social origins to amass very large fortunes. Many of the wealthiest bourgeois built their own palatial townhouses in the Faubourg Saint-Germain, in the Montmartre quarter, the banking center of the city, or close to the Palais Royal. The upper middle class, once they had made their fortunes, frequently lived by buying the debts and collecting rentes from the nobility and the government, which during the 18th century were both always short of cash. While the nobles tended to dress in splendid and elaborate costumes with bright colors, the bourgeoisie opted for a more conservative fashion, wearing rich fabrics but dark and sober colors. The bourgeoisie played a very active role in the civic and social affairs of each neighborhood; they were the leaders of the religious confréries which organized charitable and religious activities for each profession, managed the finances of the parish churches, and ran the corporations which governed each profession in Paris.

Some professions were able to advance up the professional and social scale. At the beginning of the 18th century, doctors were members of the same professional corporation as barbers, and required no special training. In 1731, they established the first Society of Surgeons, and in 1743, a university medical degree was required to practice surgery. In 1748, the Society of Surgeons became the Academy of Surgery. The lawyers followed the same path; at the beginning of the 18th century, the University of Paris taught only church law. In the 1730s, the lawyers formed their own association and began to provide formal professional training in civil law.

Forty-three percent of Parisian property owners were merchants or belonged to the liberal professions; thirty percent were shopkeepers and master artisans, who usually had had one or two employees and one servant, and lived above or behind their shop or workshop.

The skilled workers and craftsmen of Paris had been divided for centuries into métiers or professions. In 1776, there were 125 recognized métiers, ranging from barbers, apothecaries, bakers and cooks to sculptors, barrel-makers, lace-makers and musicians. Each métier or profession had its own corporation, rules, customs, and patron saint. The corporation set prices, controlled entry into the profession, and provided charitable services, including paying for the funeral, of members. In 1776, the government tried to reform the system, and consolidated the métiers into six corporations: the drapiers, or cloth-dealers; bonnetiers, who made and sold hats; épiciers, who sold food products; merciers, who sold clothing; pelletiers, or fur merchants, and orfèvres, who included silversmiths, goldsmiths, and jewelers.

=== Workers, servants and the poor ===
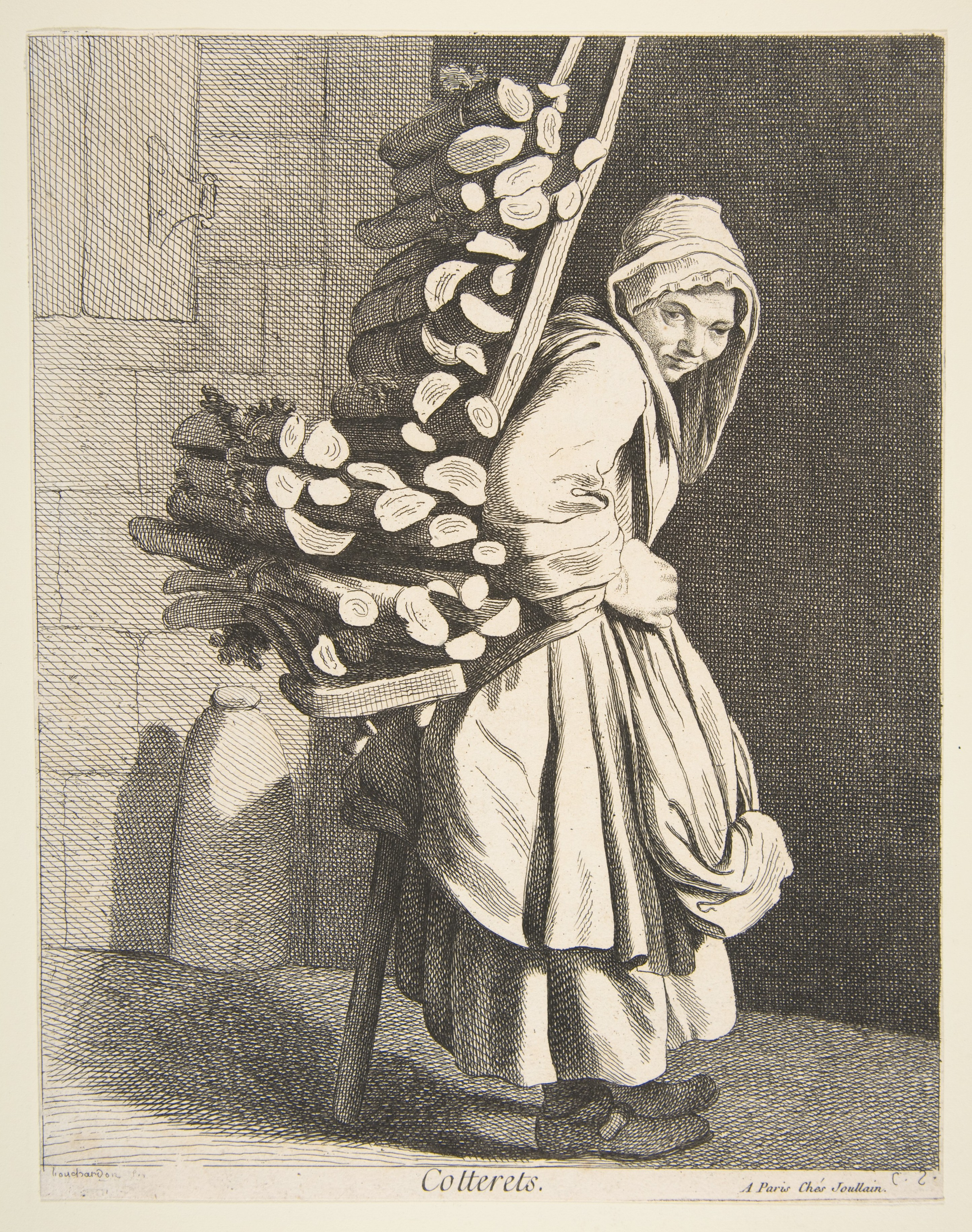
A woman selling firewood (1737)

Most Parisians belonged to the working class or the poor. There were some forty thousand domestic servants, mostly working for middle-class families. Most came from the provinces; only five percent were born in Paris. They lived with the families they served, and their living and working conditions depended entirely on character of their employers. They received very low wages, worked long hours, and if they lost their job, or if a woman became pregnant, they had little hope of getting another position. A large portion of the working poor, especially women and including many children, worked at home, sewing, embroidering, making lace, dolls, toys and other products for small shops. Workers’ wages were so low during this era, and rents so high, that even mothers with infants had to work. No longer able to keep their infants at their sides as they toiled, working-class urban mothers began to send their babies to the countryside to be cared for by women even poorer than themselves. The custom was so pervasive among all classes that cities like Paris and Lyon literally became cities without babies.

An unskilled male worker earned about twenty to thirty sous a day (there were twenty sous in a livre); a woman earned about half as much. A skilled mason could earn fifty sous. A four-pound loaf of bread cost eight or nine sous. A family with two children, where both parents worked, consumed two four-pound loaves a day. Because there were between 110 and 150 holidays, Sundays and other non-working days, families often spent half their income on bread alone. In 1700, the minimum rent for an attic room was thirty to forty livres a year; rent for two rooms was a minimum of sixty livres.

The indigent, those who were unable to support themselves, were numerous, and largely depended upon religious charity or public assistance to survive such as the philanthropic activities organized by Queen Marie Leczinska (Wife of Louis XV) who from her carriages personally gave money and clothes for the poor on her regular visits to the capital. They included the elderly, widows with children, the sick, the handicapped and the injured. In 1743, the curate of Saint-Médard in the poor Faubourg Saint-Marcel reported that of the 15,000 to 18,000 people in his parish, some 12,000 needed assistance to survive, even during good economic periods. In 1708, in the wealthier Saint-Sulpice parish), there were 13,000 to 14,000 poor who received assistance. One historian, Daniel Roche, estimated that in 1700 there were between 150,000 and 200,000 indigent persons in Paris, or about a third of the population. The number grew in times of economic hardship. This included only those who were officially recognized and assisted by the churches and the city.

Working class Parisians and the indigent tended to concentrate in the crowded maze of streets in the center of the city; on the Île de la Cité or close to the central market at Les Halles; in the eastern neighborhood of the Faubourg Saint-Antoine (One of the reasons the nobility slowly moved to the Faubourg Saint-Germain), where thousands of small workshops and the furniture business were located; or on the Left Bank, near the Bièvre River, a district known for its malodorous tanneries and dyers. In the years just before the Revolution, these neighborhoods became flooded with thousands of unskilled migrants from the poorer regions of France, further adding to their poverty, filth, unhygienic conditions, and social strain. In 1789, it was this underclass of urban unemployed and ill-fed workers that provided the foot soldiers (sans-culottes) of the Revolution.

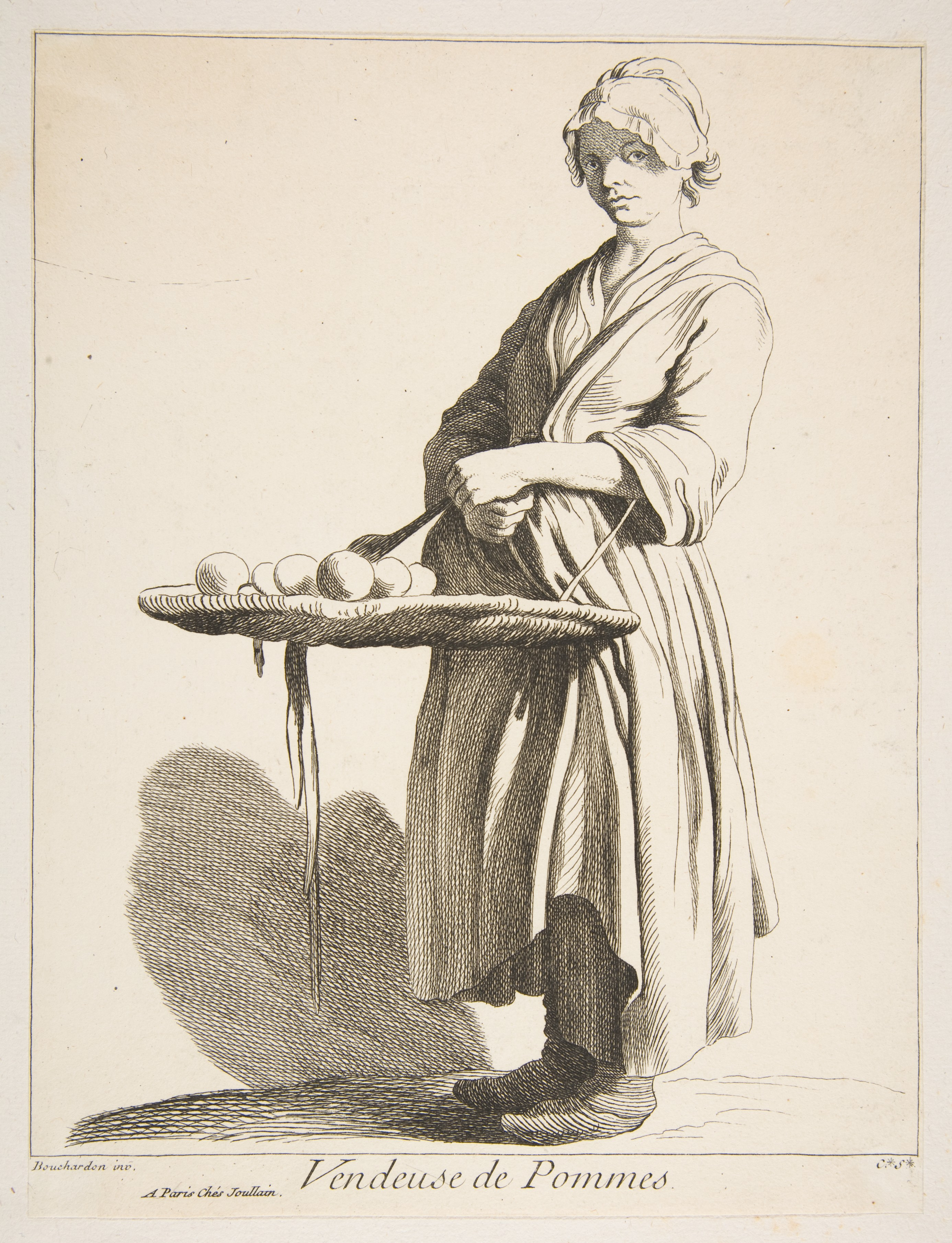
An apple-vendor

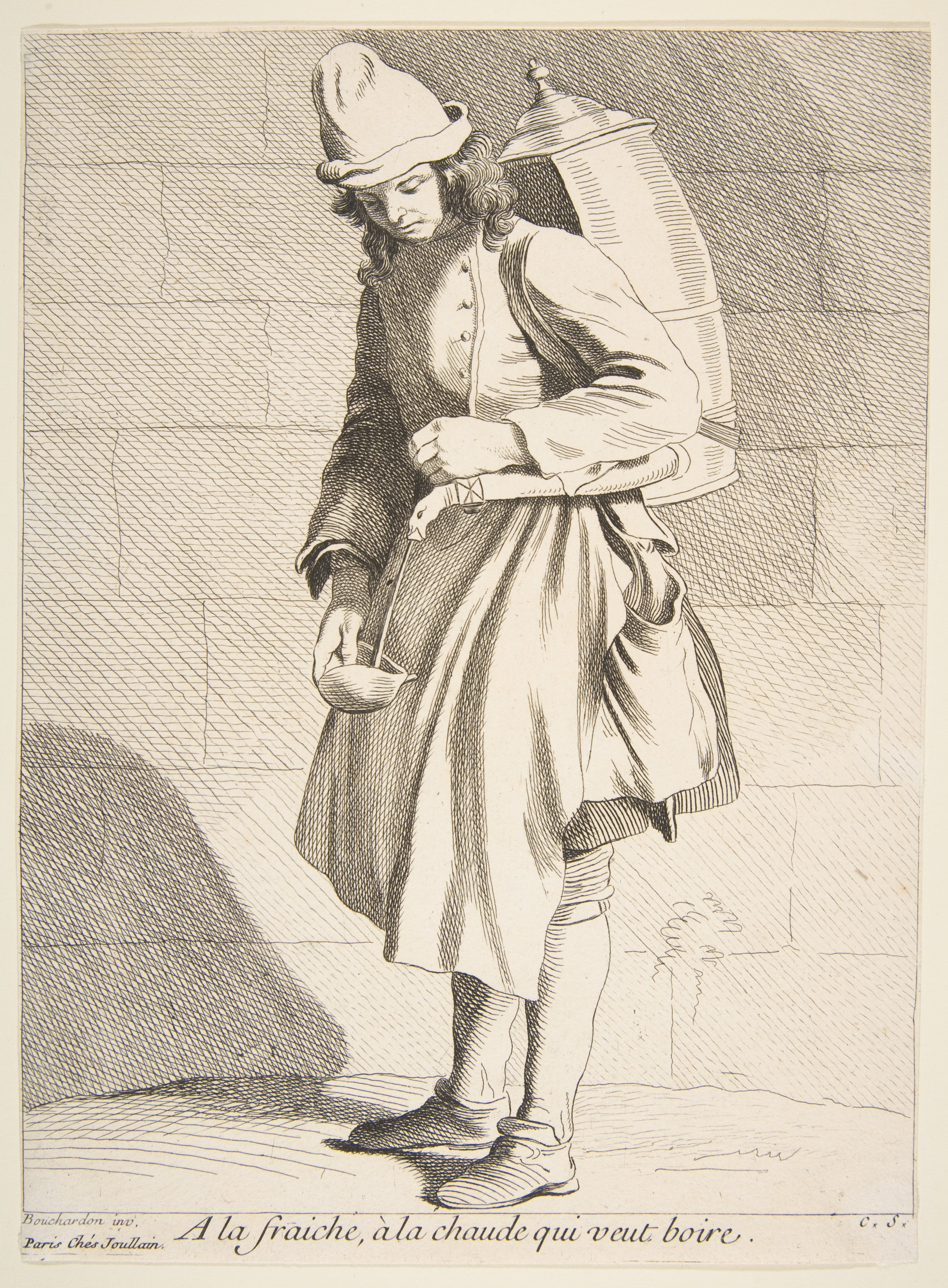
Street vendor selling drinks (1737)

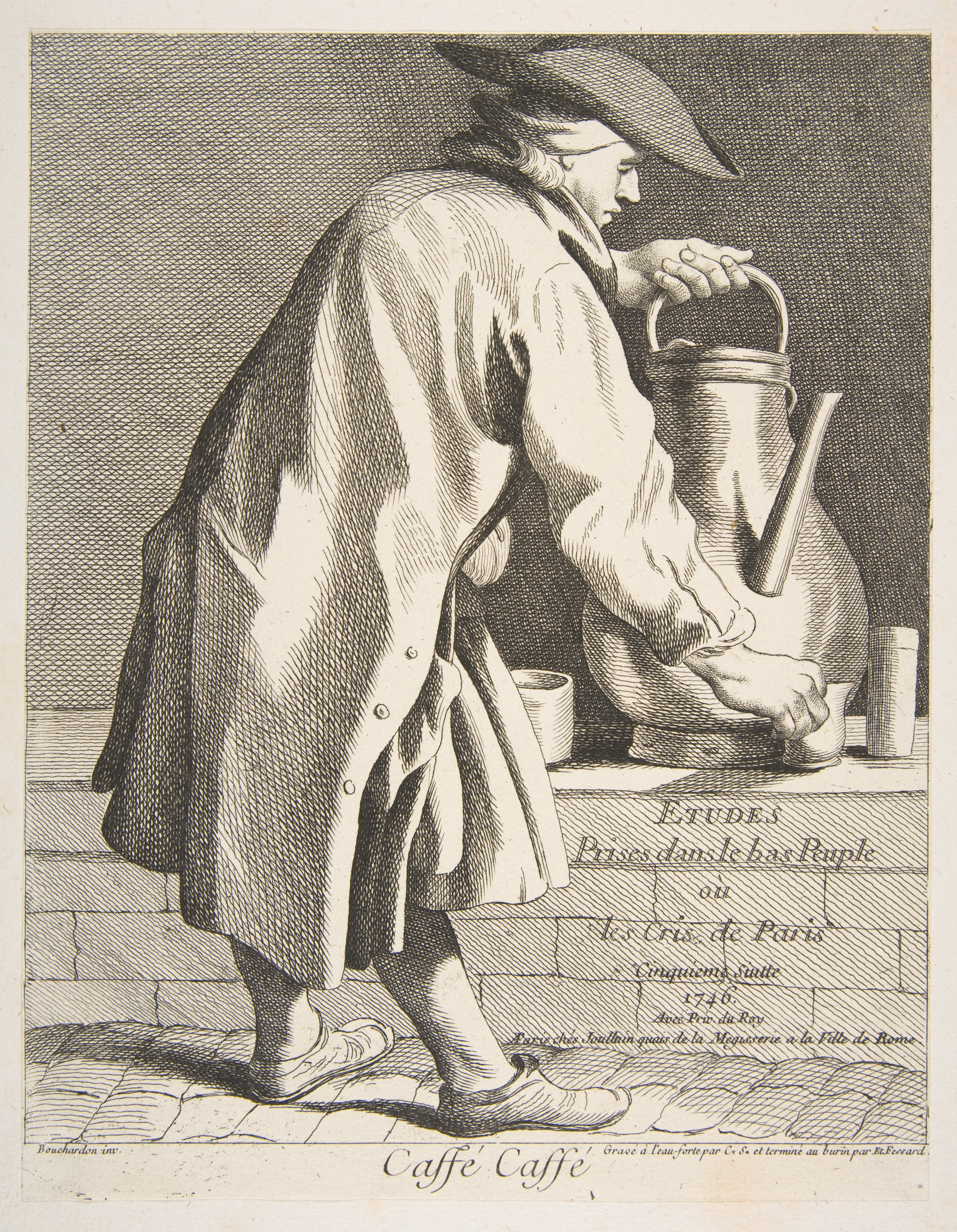
A street coffee vendor

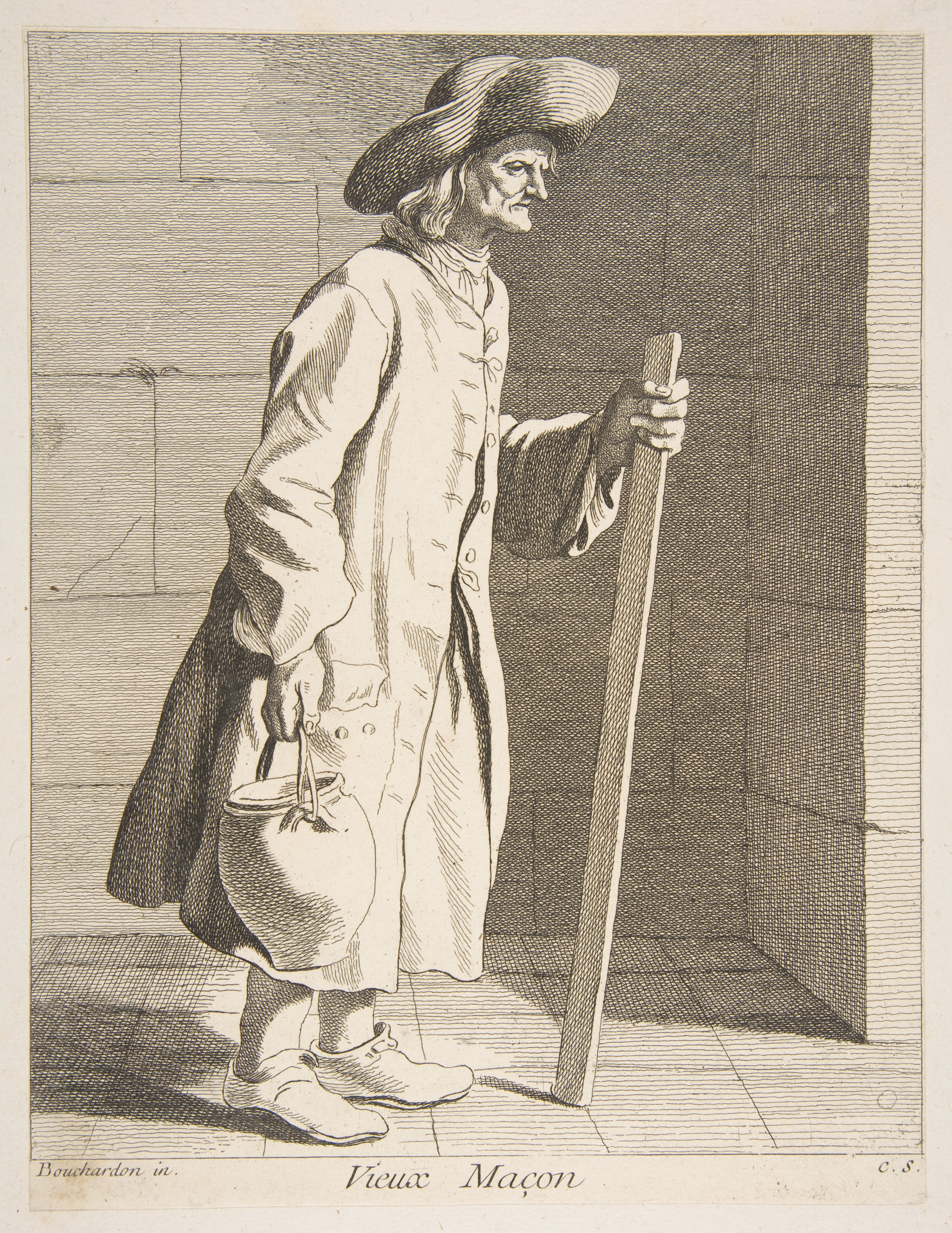
An elderly mason

== Economy ==
=== Banking and finance ===
In the domain of finance and banking, Paris was far behind other European capitals, and even other French cities. The first venture of Paris into modern finance was launched by the Scottish economist John Law, who, encouraged by the Regent, in 1716 started a private bank and issued paper money. Law invested heavily in the Mississippi Company, causing wild speculation, with shares rising to sixty times their original value. The bubble burst in 1720, and Law closed the bank and fled the country, ruining many Parisian investors. Thereafter, Parisians were suspicious of banks and bankers. The Bourse, or Paris stock market, did not open until 24 September 1724 on rue Vivienne, in the former hôtel de Nevers, long after stock markets had existed in Lyon, Marseille, Bordeaux, Toulouse and other cities. The Banque de France was not founded until 1800, long after the Bank of Amsterdam (1609), and the Bank of England (1694).

Throughout the 18th century, the government was unable to pay its mounting debts. As Saint-Simon wrote, the taxpayers of France were obliged to pay for "a war badly begun and badly supported, the greed of a prime minister, of a favorite, of a mistress, of foolish expenditures, and the prodigality of a King, which soon exhausted a bank and… undermined the Kingdom.". The ruined finances of the kingdom, and the dismissal by Louis XVI of his finance minister, the Swiss-born Jacques Necker, led Paris directly into the French Revolution in 1789.

=== Luxury goods ===
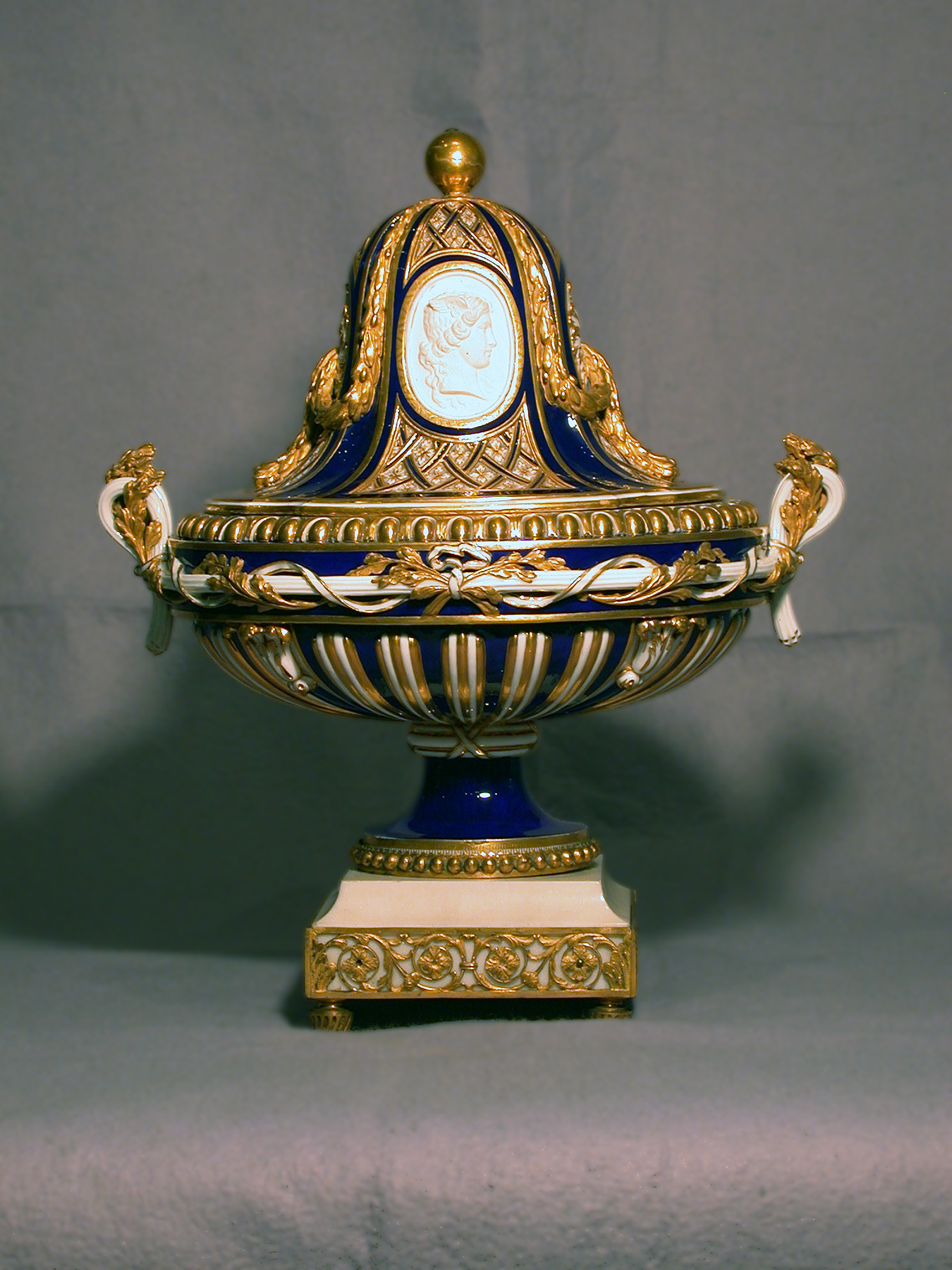
A vase from the Sèvres Porcelain Manufactory (about 1770) in the Walters Art Museum

During the 18th century, French royal workshops produced jewelry, snuff boxes, watches, porcelain, carpets, silverware, mirrors, tapestries, furniture and other luxury goods not only for the French court, but also for the Empresses of Russia, the Emperor of Austria, and the other courts of Europe. Louis XV oversaw royal manufacturers of tapestries (Gobelins and Beauvais), of carpets (Savonnerie manufactory), and established a royal workshop to make fine dishes at the Manufacture nationale de Sèvres between 1753 ann 1757. In 1759, the Sèvres manufactory became his personal property; the first French-made porcelain was presented to him on 21 December 1769. He gave complete services as gifts to the King of Denmark and the Queen of Naples, and revive the exhibition of porcelain at Versailles in 1769, which was originally organized by his late wife, Queen Marie Leczinska as early as 1748 starting with porcelain flowers when the Sevres Manufactory was then located at Vincennes. The chair-makers, upholsterers. wood carvers, and foundries of Paris were kept busy making luxury furnishings, statues, gates, door knobs, ceilings, and architectural ornament for the royal palaces and for the new town houses of the nobility in the Faubourg Saint-Germain.

=== High fashion ===
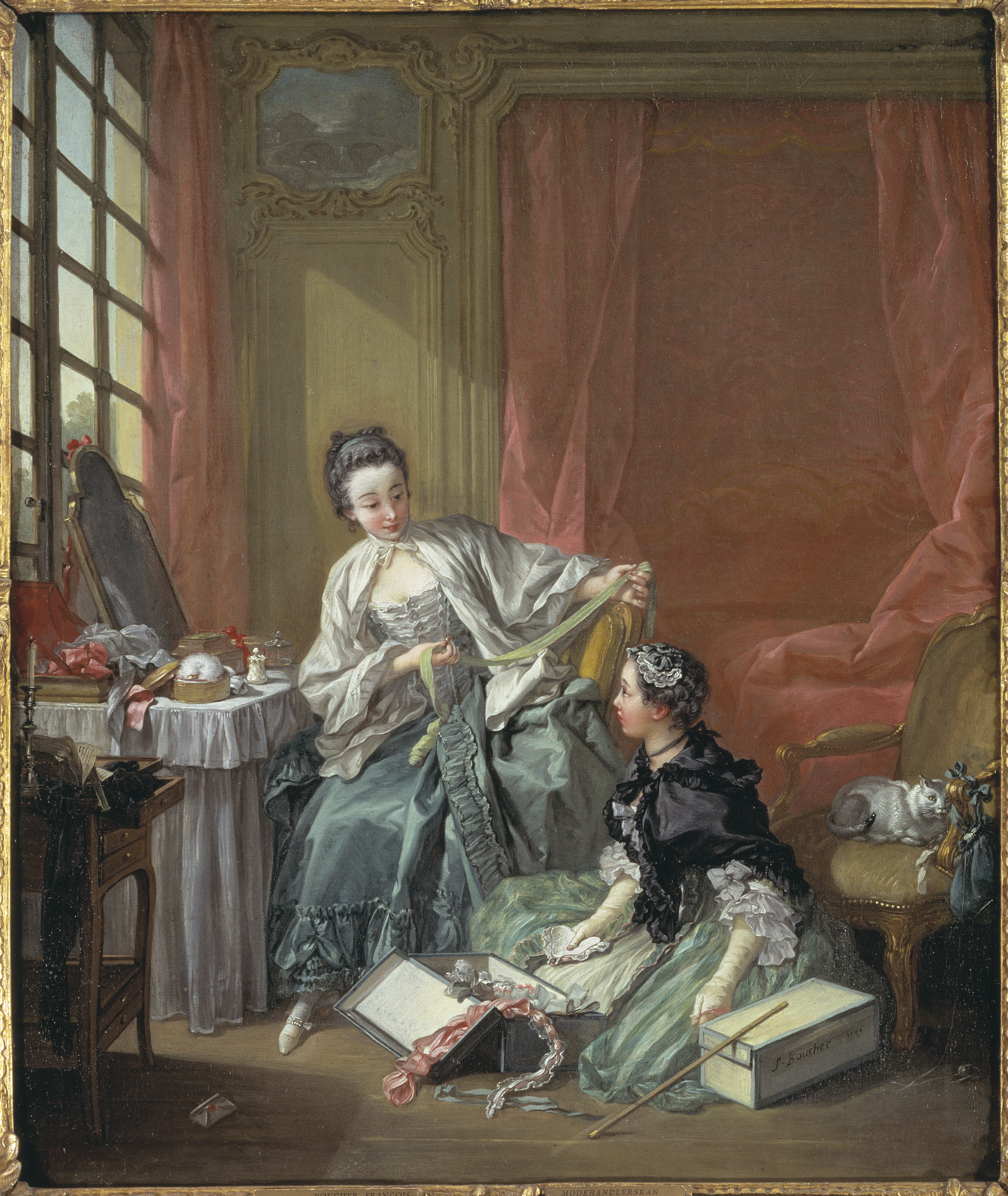
The Modiste, by François Boucher (1746)

Fashion and haute couture was a flourishing business in the mid and late 18th century, as the aristocrats copied the styles of clothing worn by the Queen and her court, and the wives of Paris bankers and wealthy merchants copied the styles worn by the aristocrats. The fashion industry was formally born in 1776, when the guild of fashion merchants (Marchandes de modes), along with plume merchants and florists, was officially separated from the mercers, those who sold ordinary clothing. By 1779, two hundred different models of hats were being sold in Paris, at prices ranging from ten to one hundred pounds, along with every other possible fashion item.

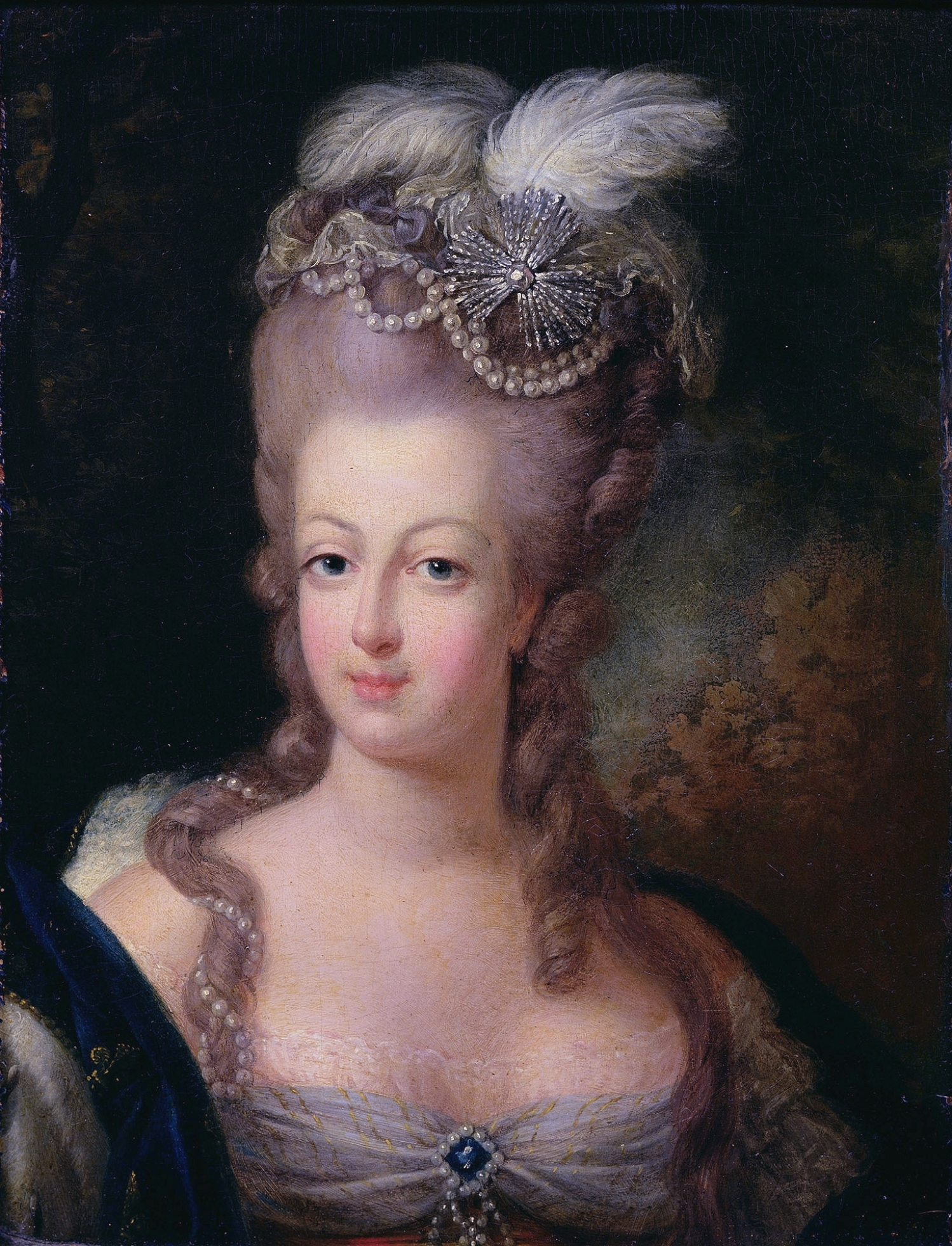
Marie Antoinette wears an elaborate pouf designed by her hair stylist, Léonard Autié (1775)

The most prominent name in fashion was Rose Bertin, who made dresses for Marie Antoinette; in 1773 she opened a shop called the Grand Mogol on the Faubourg rue Saint-Honoré that catered to the wealthiest and most fashion-conscious Parisians. The dressmaker's shops in the galleries of the Palais Royal were another important place for seeing and having copies made of the latest dresses, hats, shoes, shawls, ribbons and other accessories. A specialized press developed to provide illustrations of the new fashions to the wealthy consumers of the European capitals. The first Paris fashion journal Le Journal des Dames appeared in 1774, followed by the Galerie des modes et du costume française in 1778. The shop of Rose Bertin went out of business with the Revolution and the disappearance of her clients. but she continued to supply ribbons and other modest items to Marie-Antoinette during her imprisonment in the Temple until her execution.

The Paris perfume industry also emerged in its modern form in the second part the 18th century, after the guild of perfumers separated from the guild of glove-makers. The perfumes were usually made in Grasse, in Provence, but the shops that sold them were opened in Paris. In 1798, the perfumer of the Queen, Pierre-François Lubin, opened a perfume shop at 53 rue Helvétius (now rue Sainte-Anne), with the name au Bouquet de Roses. Other perfumers opened similar shops catering to wealthy Parisians and visitors.

Wig-makers and hair stylists also made their fortunes from wealthy and aristocratic Parisian clients. Powdered wigs for men continued to be the fashion, even during the Revolution; the architect of the Reign of Terror, Robespierre, wore a powdered wig until his own execution. The hair stylist of Marie-Antoinette, Léonard Autié, known simply as Monsieur Leonard, created extravagant poufs and other towering hair styles that were eagerly imitated by the court and the wealthiest Parisiennes.

Throughout the century, fashion was a sign of the social class of the person wearing the clothes. Aristocrats, men and women, wore the most expensive, colorful and elaborate fabrics; bankers and merchants wore more sober colors, usually dark brown, green or blue, to show their seriousness, though their wives dressed as richly as aristocrats. Men wore culottes, a type of tight short trouser attached below the knee to silk stockings. The Revolutionaries and poor mocked the rich by calling themselves the sans-culottes, those without culottes. With the Revolution and the disappearance of the aristocrats, men's clothing became less colorful and more sober, and women's clothing began to imitate the popular view of the clothing of ancient Rome and Greece, in keeping with the revolutionary ideals of the new French Republic.

Paris fashion in the 18th century

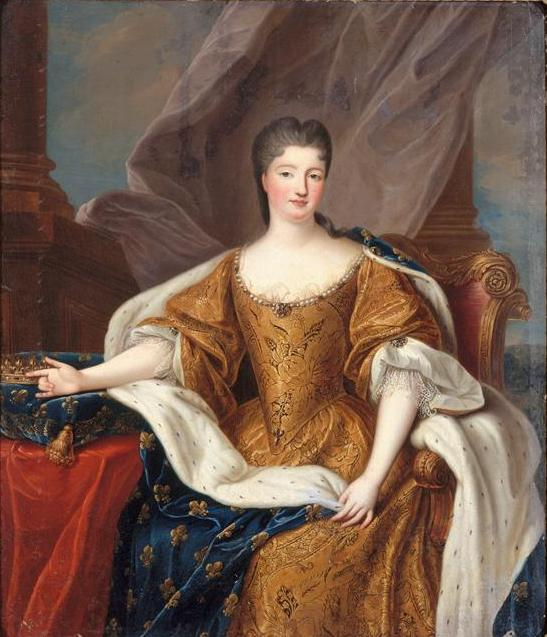
The Princess de Condé (1710)

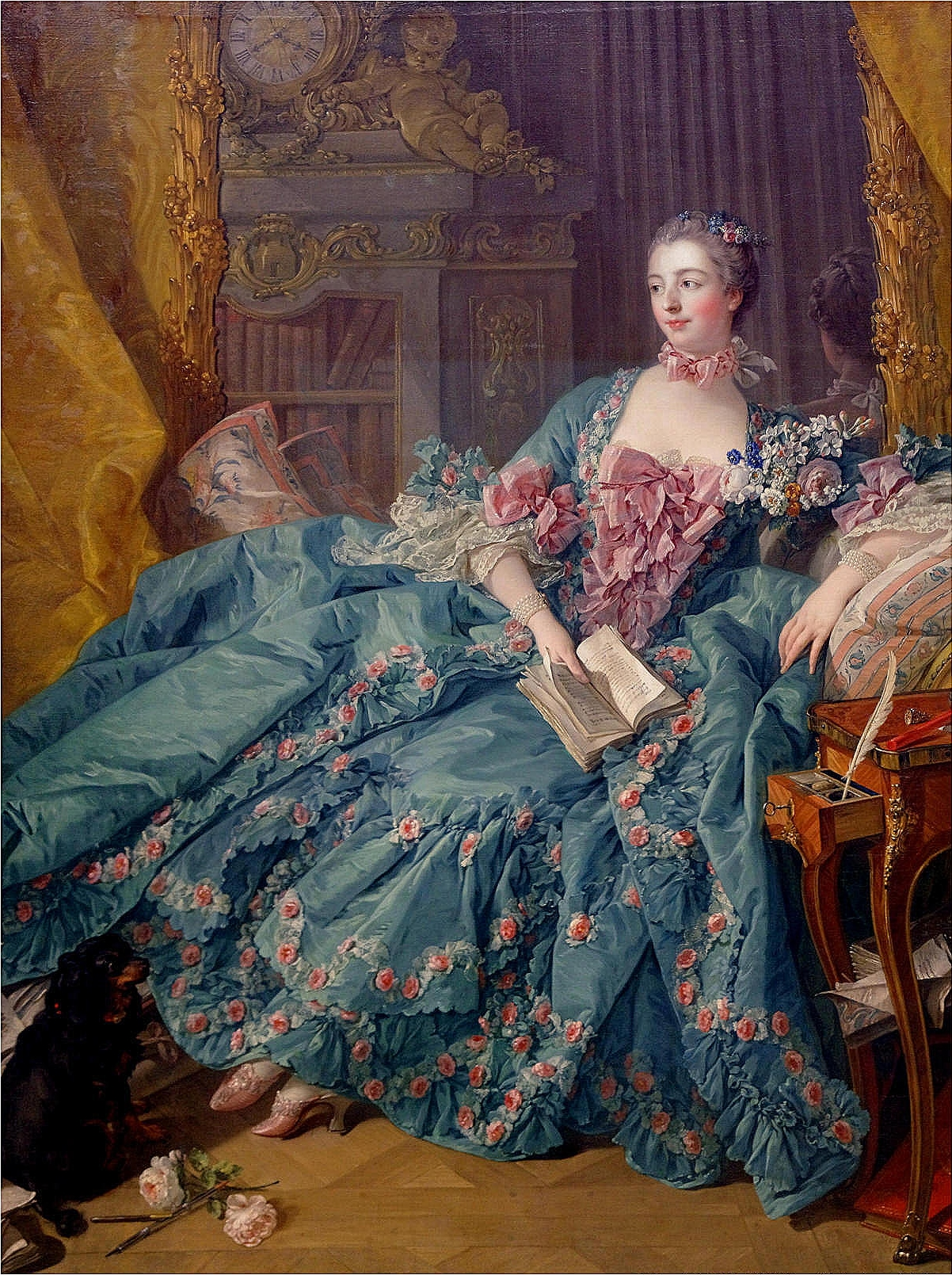
Madame de Pompadour in 1756

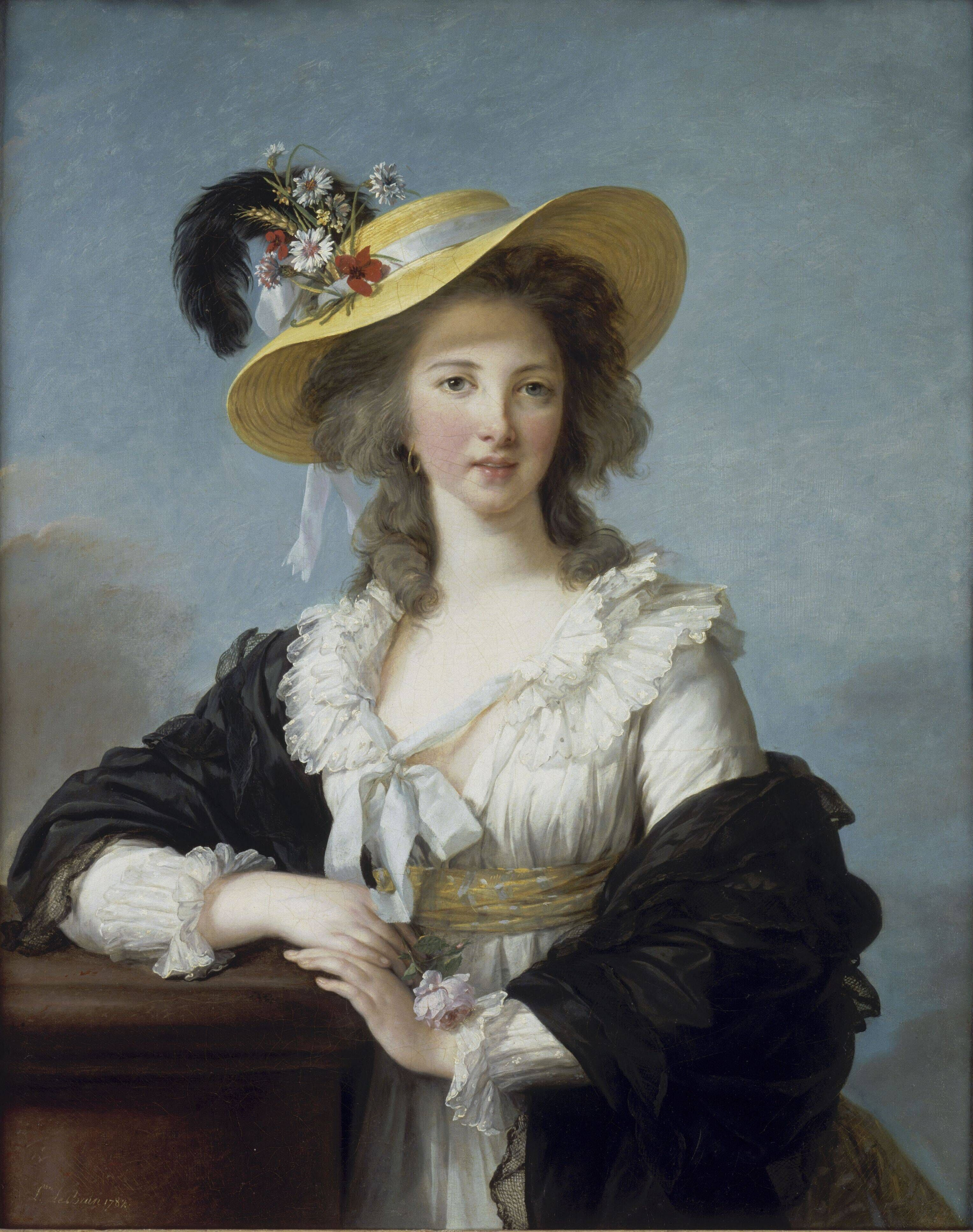
The Duchesse de Polignac (1782)

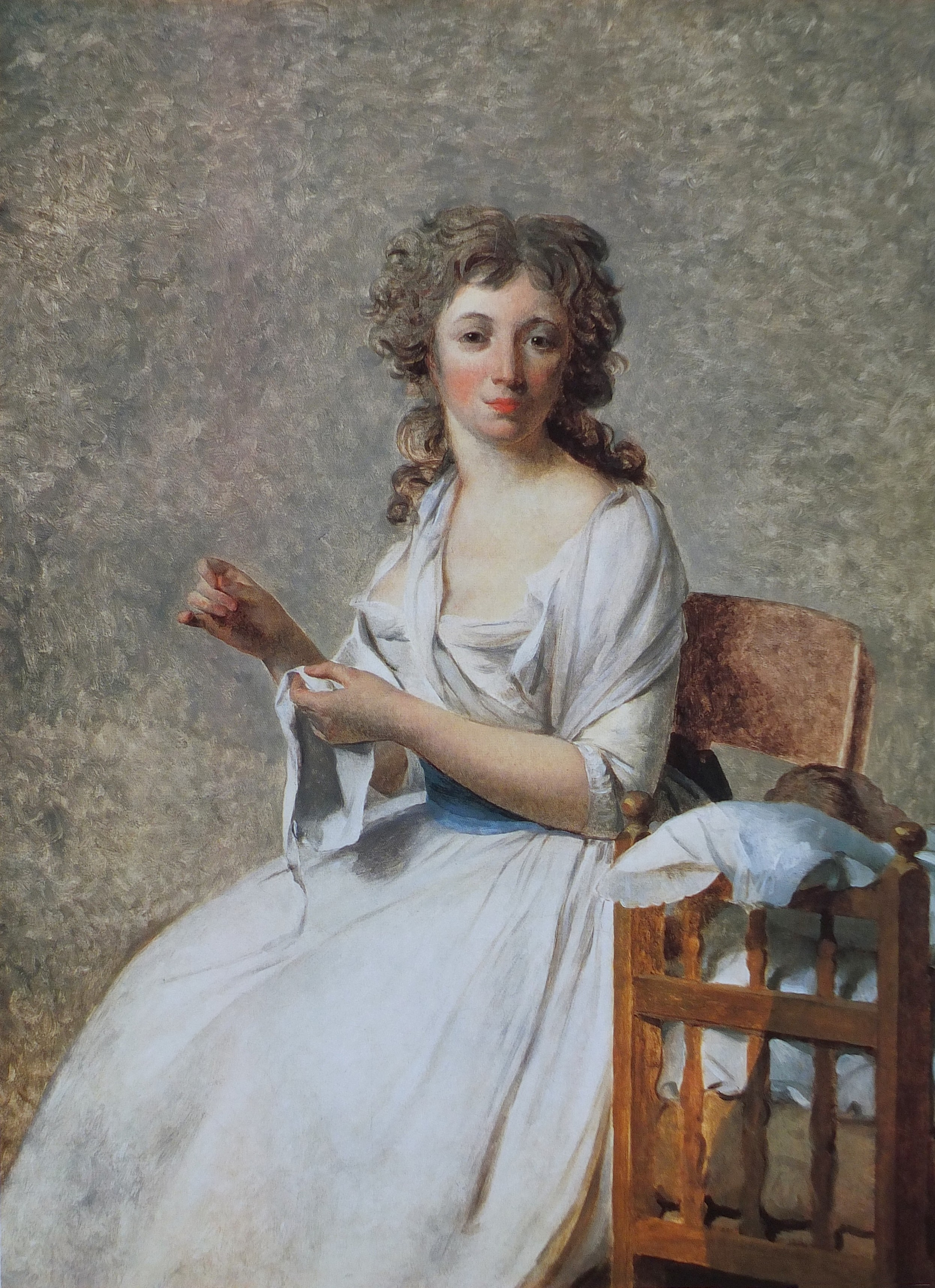
Madame Pastoret, by Jacques-Louis David (1792)

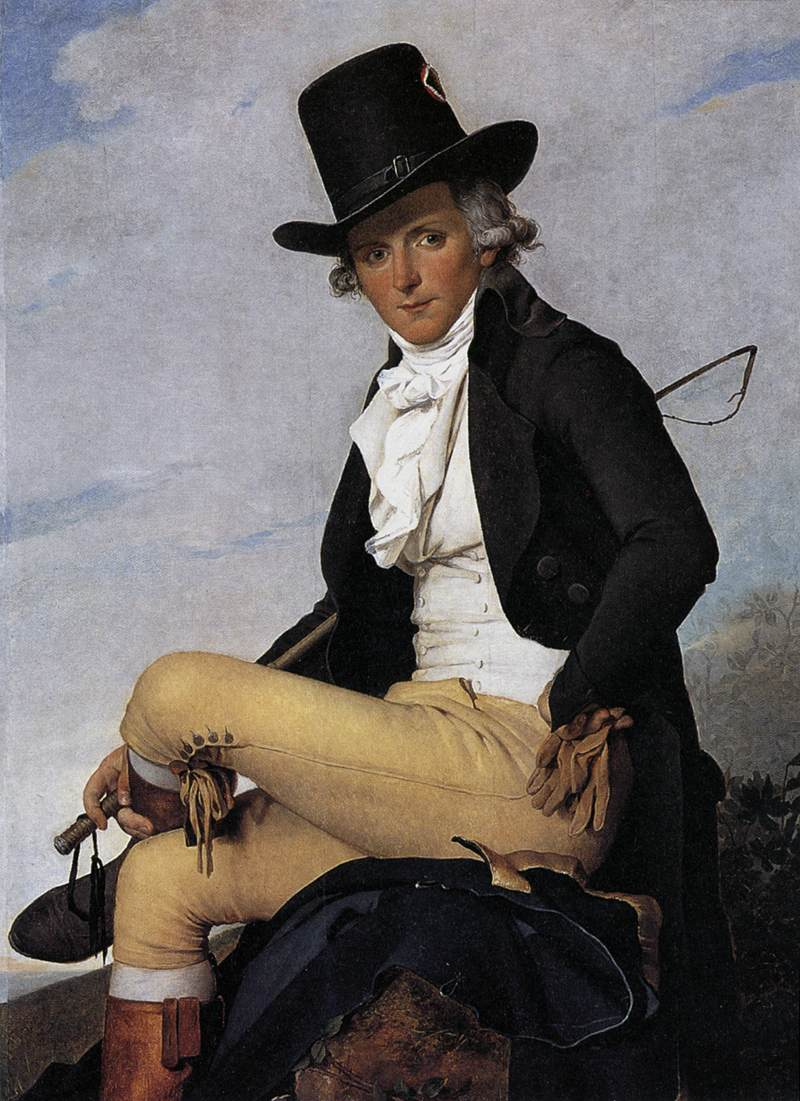
Pierre Seriziat, by Jacques-Louis David (1795)

=== From workshops to factories ===
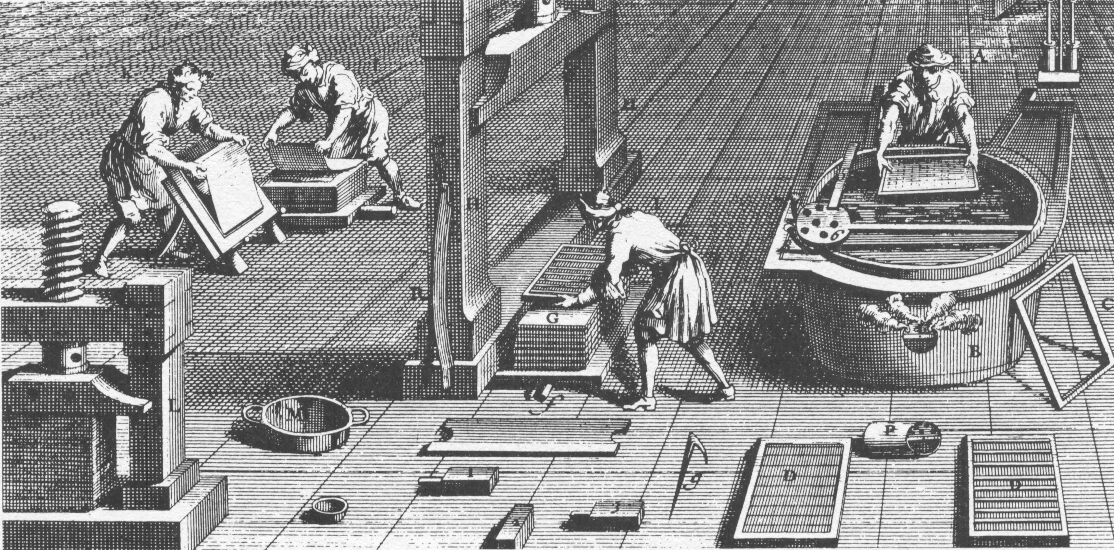
Illustration of paper manufacturing, from Diderot's Encyclopédie

During most of the 18th century, the Parisian economy was based on thousands of small workshops, where skilled artisans produced products. The workshops were clustered in particular neighborhoods; furniture makers in the faubourg Saint-Antoine; cutlery and small metal-work in neighborhood called the Quinze Vingts near the Bastille. There were a few large enterprises, including the dye factory of Gobelins, next to the Bièvre river, which made scarlet dye for the Gobelin royal tapestry workshop, the oldest factory in the city, founded at the end of the 17th century; the royal manufactory of Sèvres, making porcelain; the royal mirror factory in the faubourg Saint-Antoine, which employed a thousand workers; and the factory of Réveillon on rue de Montreuil, which made painted wallpaper. There were a handful of pioneering large-scale enterprises at the edge of the city; the Antony candle factory and a large factory making printed cotton fabrics, directed by the German-born Christophe-Philippe Oberkampf at Jouy-en-Josas, ten miles from the center of the city. Opened in 1762, this plant was one of the most modern factories in Europe; at its peak in 1774, it employed two thousand workers and produced sixty four thousand pieces of fabric.

In the second half of the 18th century, new scientific discoveries and new technologies changed the scale of Paris industry. Between 1778 and 1782, large steam engines were installed at Chaillot and Gros-Caillou to pump drinking water from the Seine. Major changes took place between 1770 and 1790 in chemical manufacturing, due to the pioneering work of French chemists. The first chemical factories were built between 1770 and 1779, based on the work of Lavoisier, an innovative chemist who was head of the laboratory of the Paris Arsenal and was also the head of the royal administration for making gunpowder. He modernized the production of saltpeter, the main ingredient of black powder, in large factories around Paris. The French chemist Berthollet discovered chlorine in 1785, creating a new industry for the manufacture of potassium chloride.

New discoveries about acids, used extensively in fabric dyeing and metallurgy, led to the creation of new industries in Paris; the first French plant to manufacture sulfuric acid was opened in 1779. It was owned by the brother of king Louis XVI, the Count of Artois; the King himself promoted it, eager that France complete successfully with England in industrial manufacturing. The chemical factory at Javel branched out to make other chemical products, including chlorine and hydrogen gas.

== Institutions ==
=== The city administration ===
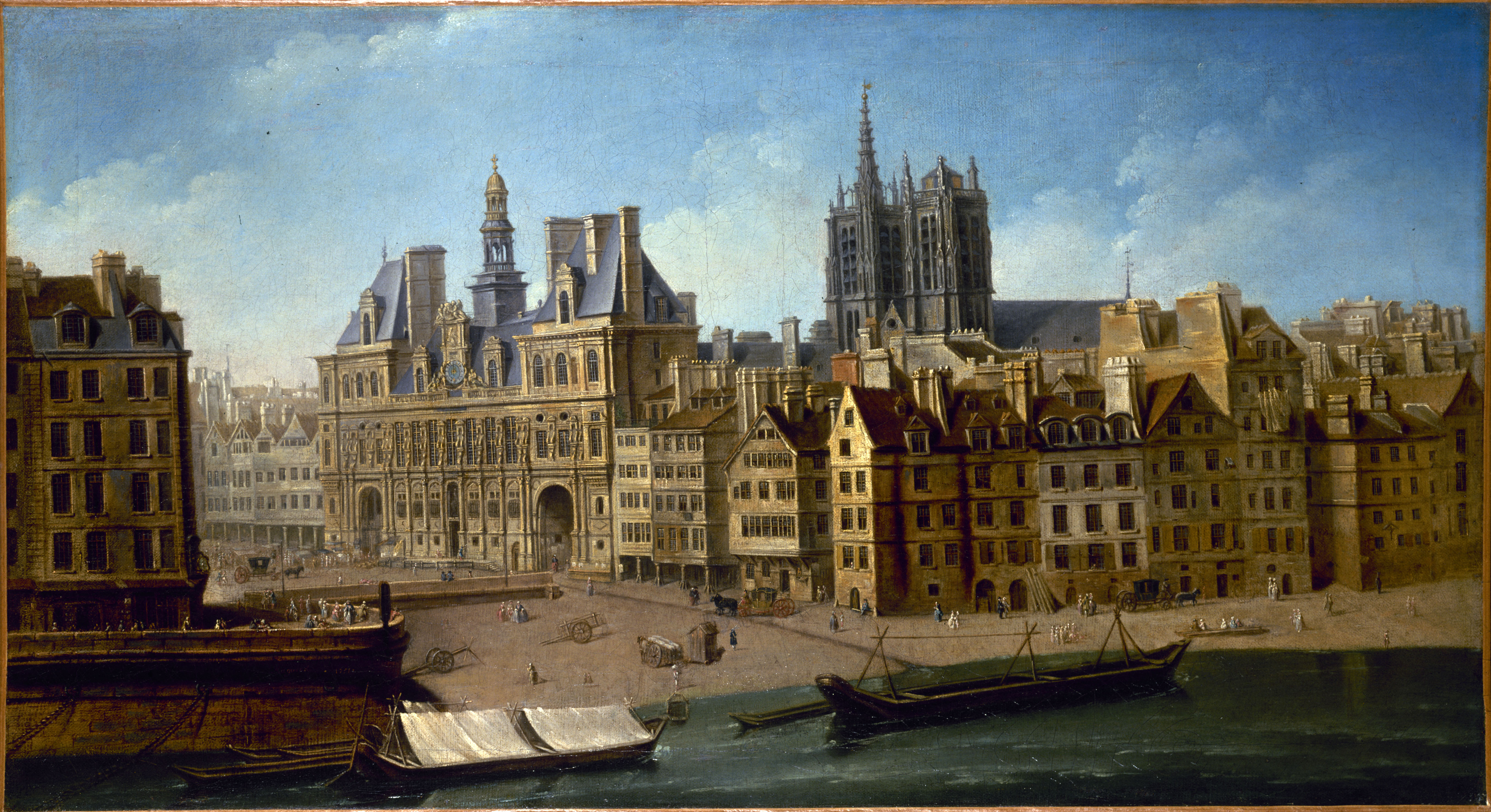
The Hôtel de Ville in 1753

From the beginning of the 18th century until the Revolution, Paris was governed by a multitude of royal Lieutenants, provosts and other officers whose positions had been created over the centuries, many of which were purely ceremonial, and none of whom had complete power over the city. The provost of the merchants, once a powerful position, had become purely ceremonial, and was named by the King. The corporations of the different professions had formerly governed Paris commerce; but after 1563, they were replaced by a system of royal commercial judges, the future commercial tribunals. The oldest and last Paris corporation, that of the river merchants, lost its rights and powers in 1672. Beginning in 1681, all the senior officials of the city, including the Provost of Paris and Governor of Paris, were nobles named by the King. The Provost and Echevins of Paris had prestige; formal costumes, carriages, banquets and official portraits, but little if any power. The position of Lieutenant General of Police, who served under the King and had his office at the fortress of Châtelet, was created in 1647. He did have some real authority; he was in charge of maintaining public order, and was also in charge of controlling weights and measures, and cleaning and lighting the streets.

With the Revolution, the city administration suddenly found itself without a royal master. On 15 July 1789, immediately after the fall of the Bastille, the astronomer Bailly was proclaimed the first modern mayor of Paris. The old city government was abolished on 15 August, and a new municipal assembly created, with three hundred members, five from each of sixty Paris districts. On 21 May 1790, the National Assembly reorganized the city government, replacing the sixty districts with forty-eight sections. each governed by sixteen commissaires and a comissiaire of police. Each section had its own committees responsible for charity, armament, and surveillance of the citizens. The Mayor was elected for two years, and was supported by sixteen administrators overseeing five departments, including the police, finances, public works, public establishments, public works, and food supplies. The Municipal Council had thirty-two elected members. Above this was the Council General of the Commune, composed the mayor, the Municipal Council, the city administrators, and ninety six notables, which met only to discuss the most important issues. This system was too complex and meetings were regularly disrupted by the representatives of the more radical sections.

On August 10, 1792, on the same day that the members of the more radical political clubs and the sans-culottes stormed the Tuileries Palace, they also took over the Hotel de Ville, expelling the elected government and an Insurrectionary Commune. New elections by secret ballot gave the insurrectionary Commune only a minority of the Council. The more radical revolutionaries succeeded in invalidating the elections of their rivals, and took complete control of Commune. Robespierre, leading the Convention and its Committee on Public Safety, distrusted the new Commune and placed it under strict surveillance. On 17 September 1793, Robespierre put the city government under the authority of the Convention and the Committee of Public Safety. In March 1794, Robespierre had his opponents in the city government arrested and sent to the guillotine, and replaced by his own supporters. When the Convention finally turned upon Robespierre on 28 July 1794, he took sanctuary with his supporters in the City Hall, but was arrested and guillotined the same day.

The new government, the Directory, had no desire to see another rival government appear in the Hôtel-de-Ville. On 11 October 1795, the Directory changed the status of Paris from an independent department to a canton of the Department of the Seine. The post of mayor was abolished, and the city was henceforth governed by the five administrators of the Department of the Seine. The city was divided into twelve municipalities subordinate to the government of the Department. Each municipality was governed by seven administrators named by the heads of the Department. Paris did not have its own elected mayor again until 1977.

=== The police ===
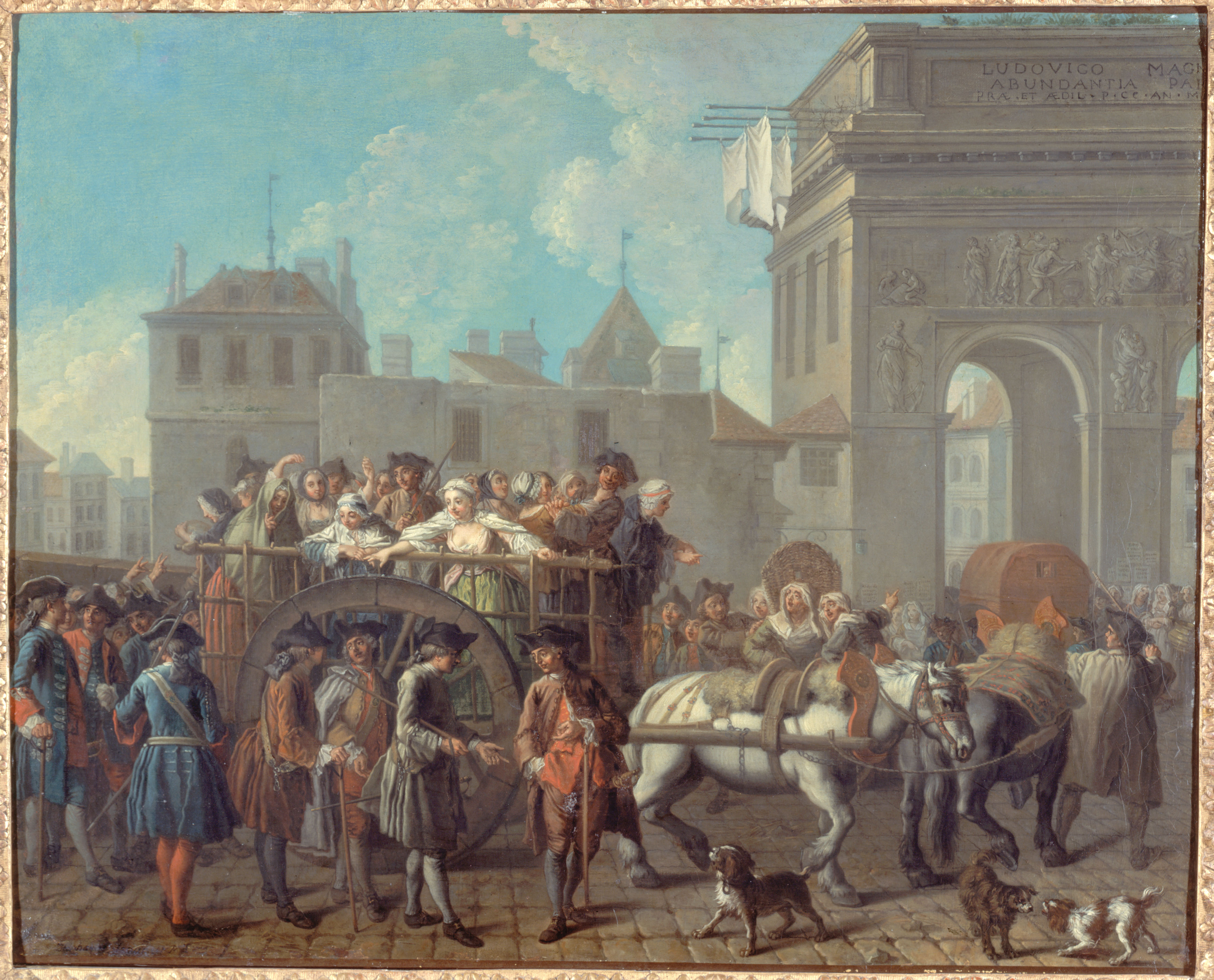
The policemen of the Guet, in blue uniforms, transport a cartload of prostitutes to the hospital-prison of Salpêtrière (1745)

At the beginning of the 18th century, security was provided by two different corps of police; the Garde de Paris and the Guet Royal, or royal watchmen. Both organizations were under the command of the Lieutenant General of Police. The Garde had one hundred twenty horsemen and four hundred archers, and was more of a military unit. The Guet was composed of 4 lieutenants, 139 archers, including 39 on horseback, and four drummers. The sergeants of the Guet wore a blue justaucorps or tight-fitting jacket with silver lace, a white plume on their hat, and red stockings, while ordinary soldiers of the guard wore a gray jacket with brass buttons and red facing on their sleeve, a white plume on their hat and a bandolier. 1750 there were nineteen posts of the Guet around the city, each the manned by twelve guards.

The members of the Guet were part of the local neighborhood, and were almost all Parisians; they were known for taking bribes and buying their commissions. The members of the Garde were mostly former army soldiers from the provinces, with little attachment to Paris. They were headquartered in the quarter Saint-Martin, and were more efficient and reliable supporters of the royal government, responsible for putting down riots in 1709 and 1725. In 1771, the Guet was formally placed under the command of the Garde, and was gradually integrated into its organization. The responsibilities of the Garde were far-ranging, from chasing criminals to monitoring bread prices, keeping traffic moving on the streets, settling disputes and maintaining public order.

The Parisians considered the police both corrupt and inefficient, and relations between the people and the police were increasingly strained. When the Revolution began, the Garde harshly repressed the first riots of 1788-89, but, submerged in the neighborhoods of Paris, it was quickly infected by revolutionary ideas. On 13 October 1789, the Garde was formally attached to the Garde Nationale. It was reformed into the Legion de Police Parisienne on 27 June 1795, but its members mutinied on 28 April 1796, when it was proposed that they become part of the Army. The Garde was finally abolished on 2 May 1796. Paris did not have its own police force again until 4 October 1802, when Napoleon created the Garde Municipale de Paris, under military command.

=== The hospitals ===
For most of the 18th century, the hospitals were religious institutions, run by the church, which provided more spiritual than actual medical care. The largest and oldest was the Hôtel-Dieu, located on the parvis of Notre-Dame Cathedral on the opposite side of the square from its present location. It was founded in 651 by Saint Landry of Paris. Its original buildings were entirely destroyed in the course of three fires in the 18th century, in 1718, 1737 and 1772. It was staffed by members of religious orders, and welcomed the destitute as well as the sick. Despite having two, three or even four patients per bed, it was always overflowing with the sick and poor of the city. The city had many smaller hospitals run by religious orders, some dating to Middle Ages; and there were also many specialized hospitals; for former soldiers at Les Invalides; for the contagious at La Sanitat de Saint-Marcel, or La Santé; a hospital for abandoned children, called Les Enfants Trouvés; a hospital for persons with sexually transmitted diseases, in a former convent on boulevard Port Royal, founded in 1784; and a hospital for orphans founded by the wealthy industrialist Beaujon, opened in 1785 on the Faubourg Saint-Honoré. Some hospitals served as prisons, where beggars were confined; these included the hospital of La Pitié, and La Salpêtrie, an enormous prison-hospital reserved for women, particularly prostitutes. In 1793, during the course of the Revolution, the royal convent of Val-de-Grâce was closed and was turned into a military hospital, and in 1795, the abbey of Saint-Antoine, in the Saint-Antoine quarter, was also converted into a hospital.

Women giving birth at Hotel-Dieu and other hospitals were almost always poor and often wanted to hide their pregnancy; they were literally confined, unable to leave, and were not allowed to have visitors. They wore bed clothes with blue markings so they could be spotted if they tried to leave without authorization. They slept in large beds for four persons each. In 1795, the first maternity hospital in Paris was opened at Port-Royal, which eventually also included a school for training midwives.

As the practice of vaccination was introduced and showed its effectiveness, patients began to have more confidence in medical healing. In 1781, the responsibility for medical care was formally transferred from church authority to the medical profession; patients were no longer admitted to the Hôtel-Dieu except for medical treatment, and doctors insisted that the medical treatment be scientific, not just spiritual. As medical schools became more connected to hospitals, the bodies of patients were seen as objects of medical observation used to study and teach pathological anatomy, rather than just bodies in need of hospital care.

=== Prisons and the debut of the guillotine ===
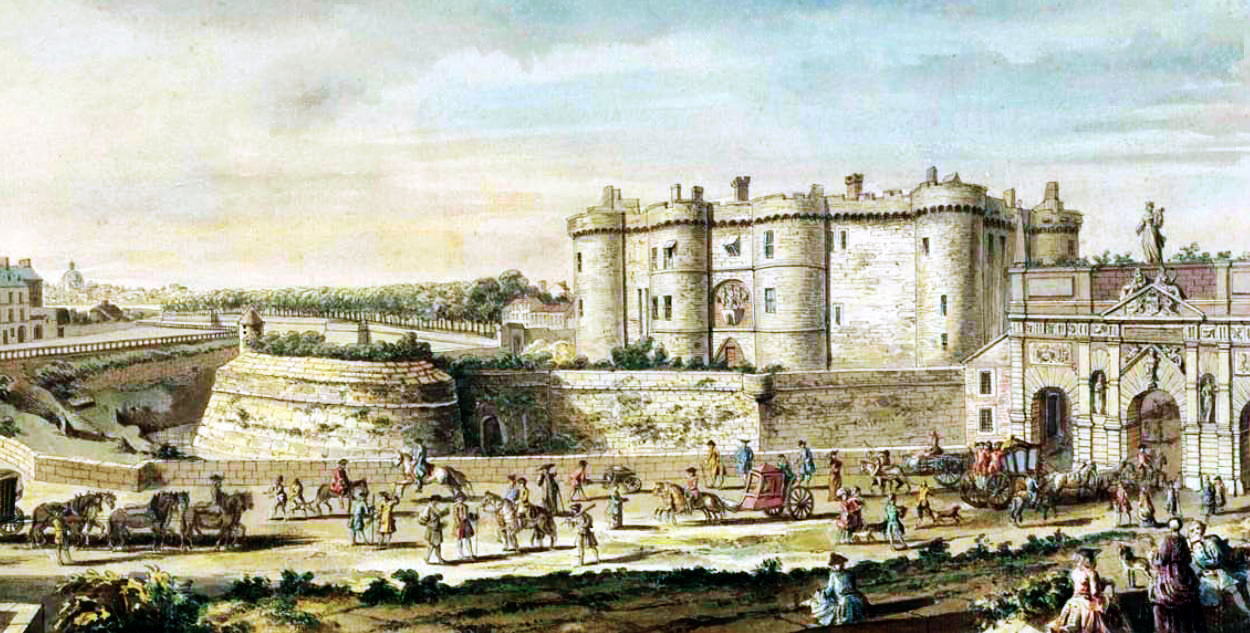
The Bastille in 1715

Paris possessed an extraordinary number and variety of prisons, used for different classes of persons and types of crimes. The fortress of the Châtelet was the oldest royal prison, where the office of the Provost of Paris was also located. It had about fifteen large cells; the better cells were on the upper levels, where prisoners could pay a high pension to be comfortable and well-fed, while the lower cells, called de la Fosse, de la Gourdaine, du Puits and de l'Oubliette, were extremely damp and barely lit by the sun coming through a grate at street level. The Bastille and the Château de Vincennes were both used for high-ranking political prisoners, and had relatively luxurious conditions. The last three prisoners at the Chateau de Vincennes, the Marquis de Sade and two elderly and insane noblemen, were transferred to the Bastillle in 1784. The Bastille, begun in 1370, never held more than forty inmates; At the time of the Revolution, the Bastille had just seven prisoners; four counterfeiters, the two elderly noblemen, and a man named Tavernier, half-mad, accused of participation in an attempt to kill Louis XV thirty years earlier. Priests and other religious figures who committed crimes or other offenses were tried by church courts, and each priory and abbey had its own small prison. That of the Abbey of Saint-Germain-des-Prés was located at 166 boulevard Saint-Germain, and was a square building fifteen meters in diameter, with floors of small cells as deep as ten meters underground. The Abbey prison became a military prison under Louis XIV; in September 1792, it was the scene of a terrible massacre of prisoners, the prelude to the Reign of Terror.

Two large prisons which also served as hospitals had been established under Louis XIV largely to hold the growing numbers of beggars and the indigent; La Salpêtrière, which held two to three hundred condemned women, largely prostitutes; and Bicêtre, which held five prisoners at the time of the Revolution. Conditions within were notoriously harsh, and there were several mutinies by prisoners there in the 18th century. La Salpêtrière was closed in 1794, and the prisoners moved to a new prison of Saint-Lazare.

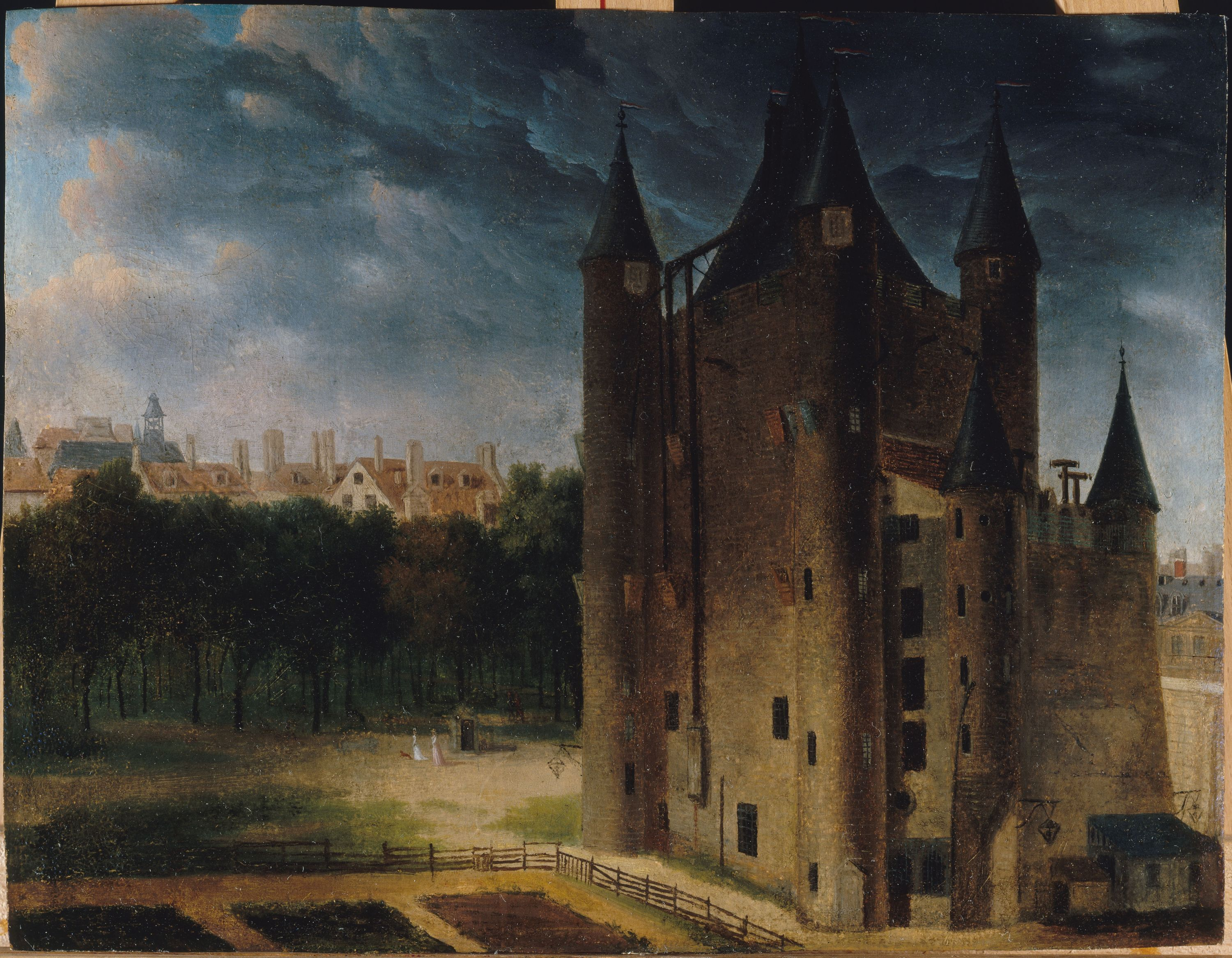
The tower of the Temple, where the royal family were held prisoner, in 1795

For-l'Evêque on the quai Mégesserie, built in 1222, held prisoners guilty of more serious crimes; it was only 35 meters by nine meters in size, built for two hundred prisoners, but by the time of the Revolution it held as many as five hundred prisoners. It was finally demolished in 1783, and replaced by a new prison, created in 1780 by the transformation of the large town house of the family of La Force on rue de Roi-de-Sicilie, which became known as Grande Force. A smaller prison, called la Petite Force, was opened in 1785 nearby at 22 rue Pavée. A separate prison was created for those prisoners who had been sentenced to the galleys; they were held in the château de la Tournelle at 1 quai de la Tournelle; twice a year these prisoners were transported out of Paris to the ports to serve their sentences on the galleys.

In addition to the royal and ecclesiastical prisons, there were also a number of privately owned prisons, some for those who were unable to pay debts, and some, called masons de correction, for parents who wanted to discipline their children; the young future revolutionary Louis Antoine de Saint-Just was imprisoned by his mother in one of these for running away and stealing the family silverware.

During the Reign of Terror of 1793 and 1794, all the prisons were filled, and additional space was needed to hold accused aristocrats and counter-revolutionaries. The King and his family were imprisoned within the tower of the Temple. The Luxembourg Palace and the former convents of Les Carmes (70 rue Vaugirard) and Port-Royal (121-125 boulevard Port-Royal) were turned into prisons. The Conciergerie within the Palace of Justice was used to hold accused criminals during their trial; Marie-Antoinette was held there until her sentence and execution.

In the first half of the 18th century, under the Old Regime, criminals could be executed either by hanging, decapitation, burning alive, boiling alive, being broken on a wheel, or by drawing and quartering. The domestic servant Robert-François Damiens, who tried to kill King Louis XV, was executed in 1757 by drawing and quartering, the traditional punishment for regicide. His punishment lasted an hour before he died, the last man in France to suffer that penalty. Among the last persons to be hung in Paris was the Marquis de Favras, who was hung on the Place de Greve for attempting help Louis XVI in his unsuccessful flight from Paris.

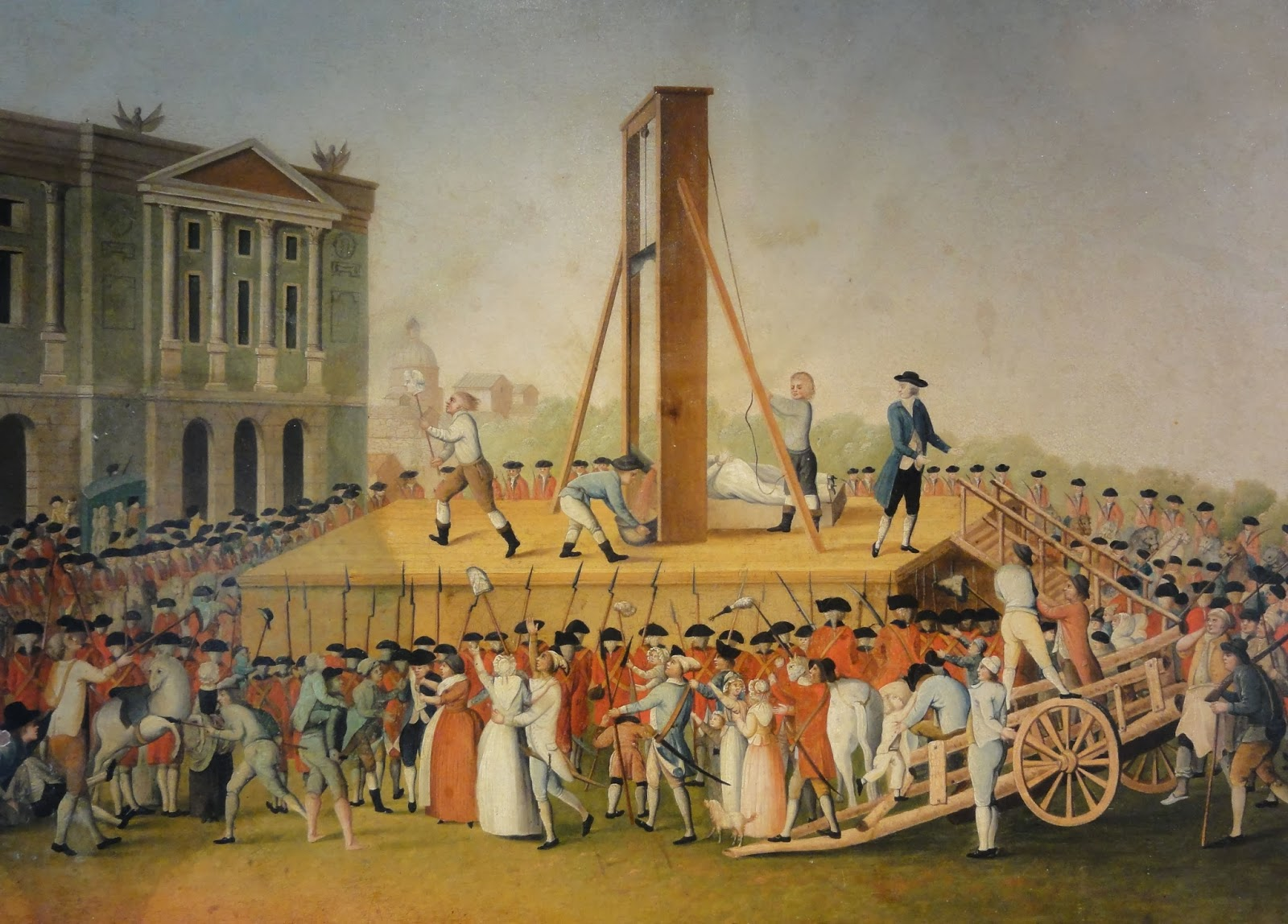
The execution by the guillotine of Marie Antoinette on 16 October 1793

In October 1789 Doctor Joseph-Ignace Guillotin, in the interest of finding a more humane method, successfully had the means of execution changed to decapitation by a machine he perfected, the guillotine, built with the help of a Paris manufacturer of pianos and harps named Tobias Schmidt and the surgeon Antoine Louis. The first person to be executed with the guillotine was the thief Nicholas Jacques Pelletier, on 25 April 1792. After the uprising of the sans-culottes and the fall of the monarchy on August 10, 1792, the guillotine was turned against alleged counter-revolutionaries; the first to be executed by the guillotine was Collenot d'Angremont, accused of defending the Tuileries Palace against the attack of the sans-culottes; he was executed on 21 August 1792 on the place du Carousel, next to the Tuileries Palace. The King was executed on the Place de la Concorde, renamed the Place de la Revolution, on 21 January 1793. From that date until 7 June 1794, 1,221 persons, or about three a day, were guillotined on the Place de la Revolution, including Queen Marie-Antoinette on 16 October 1793. In 1794, for reasons of hygiene, the Convention had the guillotine moved to the place Saint-Antoine, now the rue de la Bastille, near the site of the old fortress; seventy-three heads were cut off in just three days. In June 1793, again for reasons of avoiding epidemics, it was moved to the Place du Tron-Renversé (the Place of the Overturned Throne, now Place de la Nation). There, at the height of the Reign of Terror, between 11 June and 27 July, 1,376 persons were beheaded, or about thirty a day. After the execution of Robespierre himself, the reign of terror came to an end. The guillotine was moved to the Place de Grève, and was used only for the execution of common criminals.

=== The University and Grandes écoles ===
The University of Paris had fallen gradually in quality and influence since the 17th century. It was primarily a school of theology, not well adapted to the modern world, and played no important role in the scientific revolution or the Enlightenment. The school of law taught only religious law, and the medical school had little prestige, since doctors, until the mid-18th century, were considered in the same professional category as barbers. The university shrank from about sixty colleges in the early 17th century to thirty-nine in 1700. In 1763, the twenty-nine smallest colleges were grouped together in the college Louis-le-Grand, but altogether it had only 193 students. On 5 April 1792, without any loud protest, the University was closed. Following its closing, the chapel of the Sorbonne was stripped for its furnishings and the head of its founder, Cardinal Richelieu, was cut out of the famous portrait by Philippe de Champaigne. The building of the College de Cluny on Place Sorbonne was sold; the College de Sens became a boarding house, the College Lemoine was advertised as suitable for shops; the College d'Harcourt was half-demolished and the other half turned into workshops for tanners and locksmiths, and the College Saint-Barbe became a workshop for mechanical engineers. The University was not re-established until 1808, under Napoleon, with the name Université imperial.

While the University vanished, new military science and engineering teaching schools flourished during the Revolution, as the revolutionary government sought to create a highly centralized and secular education system, centered in Paris. Some of the schools had been founded before the Revolution; the School of bridges and highways, France's first engineering school, was founded in 1747. The École Militaire was founded in 1750 to give an academic education to the sons of poor nobles; its most famous graduate was Napoleon Bonaparte in 1785; he completed the two-year course in just one year. The Ecole Polytechnique was founded in 1794, and became a military academy under Napoleon in 1804. The École Normale Supérieure was founded in 1794 to train teachers; it had some of France's best scientists on its faculty. These so-called Grandes écoles trained engineers and teachers who launched the French industrial revolution in the 19th century.

=== Religions and the Freemasons ===
The great majority of Parisians were at least nominally Roman Catholic, and the church played an enormous role in the life of the city; though its influence declined toward the end of the century, partly because of the Enlightenment, and partly from conflicts within the church establishment. The church, along with the nobility, suffered more than any other institutions from the French Revolution.

For most of the 18th century, until the Revolution, the church ran the hospitals and provided the health care in the city; was responsible for aiding the poor, and ran all the educational establishments, from the parish schools through the University of Paris. The nobility and the higher levels of the church were closely linked; the archbishops, bishops and other high figures of the church came from noble families, promoted their relatives, lived with ostentatious luxury, did not always live highly moral lives. Talleyrand, though a bishop, never bothered to hide his mistress, and was much more involved in politics than religious affairs. At the beginning of the century the Confreries, corporations of the members of each of the different Paris professions, were very active in each parish at the beginning of the century, organizing, events and managing the finances of the local churches, but their importance declined over the century, as the nobility, rather than the merchants, took over management of the church.

The church in Paris also suffered from internal tensions. In the 17th century, as part of the Counter-Reformation, forty-eight religious orders, including the Dominicans, Franciscans, Jacobins, Capucines, Jesuits and many others, had established monasteries and convents in Paris. These establishments reported to the Pope in Rome rather than to the Archbishop of Paris, which soon caused trouble. The leaders of the Sorbonne chose to support the leadership of the archbishop rather than the Pope, so the Jesuits established their own college, Clermont, within the University of Paris, and constructed their own church, Saint-Louis, on the rue Saint-Antoine. The conflicts continued; The Jesuits refused to grant absolution to Madame de Pompadour, mistress of the King, because she was not married to him, 1763 and 1764 the King closed the Jesuit colleges and expelled the order from the city.

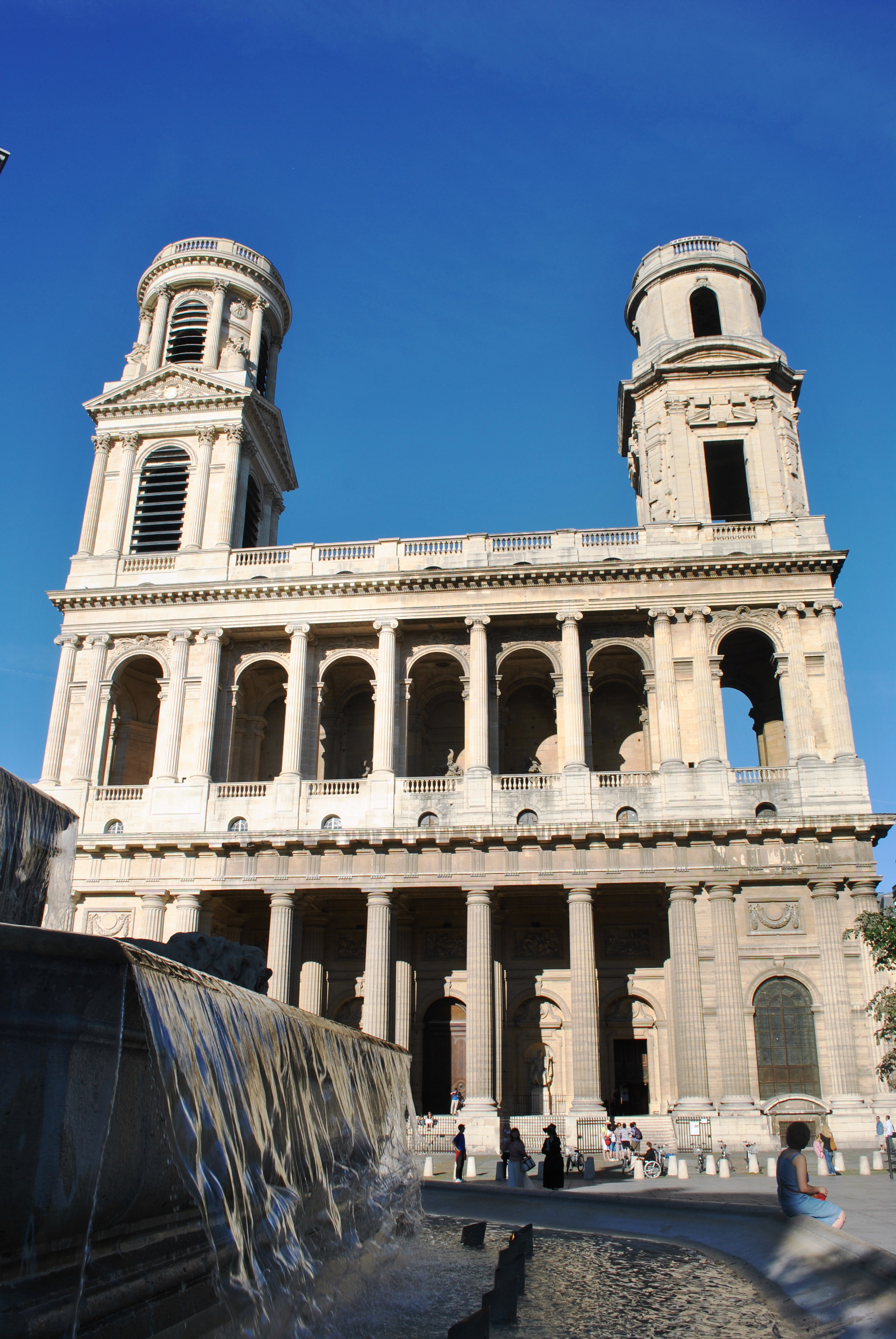
The unfinished south tower of the church of Saint-Sulpice, left as it was in 1789.

The Enlightenment also caused growing difficulties, as Voltaire and other Philosophes argued against unquestioned acceptance of the doctrines of the church. Paris became a battleground between the established church and the largely upper-class followers of a sect called Jansenism, founded in Paris in 1623, and fiercely persecuted by both Louis XIV and the Pope. The archbishop of Paris required that dying persons sign a document renouncing Jansenism; if they refused to sign, they were denied last rites from the church. There were rebellions over smaller matters as well; in 1765 twenty-eight Benedictine monks petitioned the King to postpone the hour of first prayers so they could sleep longer, and to have the right to wear more attractive robes. The church in Paris also had great difficulty recruiting new priests among the Parisians; of 870 priests ordained in Paris between 1778 and 1789, only one-third were born in the city.

The Catholic diocese of Paris also was having financial problems late in the century. It was unable to pay for the completion of the south tower of the church of Saint-Sulpice. though the north tower was rebuilt between 1770 and 1780; the unfinished tower is still as it was in 1789. unable to finish it to complete the churches of Saint-Barthélemy and Saint-Sauveur. Four old churches, falling into ruins, were torn down and not replaced because of lack of funds.

After the fall of the Bastille, the new National Assembly argued that the belongings of the church belonged to the nation, and ordered that church property be sold to pay the debts incurred by the monarchy. Convents and monasteries were ordered closed, and their buildings and furnishings sold as national property. Priests were no longer permitted to take vows; instead, they were required to take an oath of fidelity to the nation. Twenty-five of fifty Paris curates agreed to take the oath, along with thirty-three of sixty-nine vicars, a higher proportion than in other parts of France. Conflicts broke out in front of churches, where many parishioners refused to accept the priests who had taken the oath to the government. As the war began against Austria and Prussia, the government hardened its line against the priests who refused to take the oath. They were suspected of being spies, and a law was passed on 27 May 1792 calling for their deportation. large numbers of these priests were arrested and imprisoned; in September 1792 more than two hundred priests were taken from the jails and massacred.

During the Reign of Terror, the anti-religious campaign intensified. All priests, including those who had signed the oath, were ordered to sign a declaration giving up the priesthood. One third of the four hundred priests remaining renounced their profession. On 23 November 1793, all the churches in Paris were closed, or transformed into "temples of reason". Civil divorce was made simple, and 1,663 divorces were granted in the first nine months of 1793, along with 5,004 civil marriages. A new law on 6 December 1793 permitted religious services in private, but in practice the local revolutionary government arrested or dispersed anyone who tried to celebrate mass in a home.

After the execution of Robespierre, the remaining clerics in prison were nearly all released, but the Convention and Directory continued to be hostile to the church. On 18 September 1794, they declared that the state recognized no religion, and therefore cancelled salaries they had been paying to the priests who had taken an oath of loyalty to the government.and outlawed the practice of allowing government-owned buildings for worship. On 21 February, the Directory recognized the liberty of worship, but outlawed any religious symbols on the exterior of buildings, prohibited wearing religious garb in public, and prohibited the use of government-owned buildings, including churches, for worship. On May 30, 1795, the rules were softened slightly and the church was allowed the use of twelve churches, one per arrondissement; the churches opened included the Cathedral of Notre Dame, Saint-Roche, Saint-Sulpice and Saint-Eustache. The number of recognized priests who had taken the oath the government fell from six hundred in 1791 to one hundred fifty in 1796, to seventy-five in 1800, In addition, there were about three hundred priests who had not taken the oath secretly conducting religious services. The Catholic Church was required to share the use of Notre-Dame, Saint-Sulpice and Saint-Roche with two new secular religions based on reason that had been created in the spirit of the Revolution; The church of Theophilanthropy and the Church of the Decadaire, the latter named for the ten-month revolutionary calendar.

The Protestant Church had been strictly controlled and limited by the royal government for most of the 18th century. Only one church building was allowed, at Charenton, far from the center of the city, six kilometers from the Bastille. There were an estimated 8,500 Protestants in Paris in 1680, both Calvinists and Lutherans, or about two percent of the population. At Charenton, an act of religious tolerance was adopted by the royal government in November 1787, but it was opposed by the Catholic Church and the Parlement of Paris, and never put into effect. After the Revolution, the new mayor, Bailly, authorized Protestants to use the church of Saint-Louis-Saint-Thomas, next to the Louvre.

The Jewish community in Paris was also very small; an estimated five hundred persons in 1789. About fifty were Sephardic Jews who had originally come from Spain and Portugal, then lived in Bayonne before coming to Paris. They lived mostly in the neighborhood of Saint-German-des-Prés, and worked largely in the silk and chocolate-making businesses. There was another Sephardic community of about one hundred persons in the same neighborhood, who were originally from Avignon, from the oldest Jewish community in France, which had lived protected in the Papal state. They mostly worked in commerce. The third and largest community, about three hundred fifty persons, were Ashkenazi Jews from Alsace, Lorraine, Germany, the Netherlands and Poland. They spoke Yiddish, and lived largely in the neighborhood of the Church of Saint-Merri. They included three bankers, several silk merchants and jewelers, second-hand clothing dealers, and a large number of persons in the hardware business. They were granted citizenship after the French Revolution on 27 April 1791, but their religious institutions were not recognized by the French State until 1808.

The Freemasons were not a religious community, but functioned like one and had a powerful impact on events in Paris in the 18th century. The first lodge in France, the Grand Loge de France, was founded on 24 June 1738 on the rue des Boucheries, and was led by the Duke of Antin. By 1743, there were sixteen lodges in Paris, and their grand master was the Count of Clermont, close to the royal family. The lodges contained aristocrats, the wealthy, church leaders and scientists. Their doctrines promoted liberty and tolerance, and they were strong supporters of the Enlightenment; Beginning in 1737, the freemasons funded the publication of the first Encyclopédie of Diderot, by a subscription of ten Louis per member per year. By 1771, there were eleven lodges in Paris. The Duke of Chartres, eldest son of the Duke of Orleans and owner of the Palais-Royal, became the new grand master; the masons began meeting regularly in cafes, and then in the political clubs, and they played an important part is circulating news and new ideas. The Freemasons were particularly hard-hit by the Terror; the aristocratic members were forced to emigrate, and seventy freemasons were sent to guillotine in the first our months of 1794.

== Daily life ==
=== Housing ===
During the 18th century, the houses of the wealthy grew in size, as the majority of the nobility moved from the center or the Marais to the Faubourg Saint-Antoine, Faubourg Saint-German or to the Faubourg Saint-Honoré, where land was available and less expensive. Large town houses in the Marais averaged about a thousand square meters, those in the Faubourg Saint-Antoine in the 18th century averaged more than two thousand square meters, although some mansions in the Marais were still considered very large, like the Hotel de Soubise, the Hotel de Sully, and the Hotel Carnavalet, which is now a museum. The Hotel Matignon in the Faubourg Saint-Germain (now the residence and office of the Prime Minister), built in 1721, occupied 4,800 square meters, including its buildings and courtyards, plus a garden of 18,900 square meters.

In the center of the city, a typical residential building, following the codes instituted under Louis XIV, occupied about 120 square meters, and had a single level of basement or cellar. On the ground floor, there were usually two shops facing the street, each with an apartment behind it where the owner lived. A corridor led from the small front entrance to a stairway to the upper floors, then to a small courtyard behind the building. Above the ground floor there were three residential floors, each with four rooms for lodging, while the top floor, under the roof, had five rooms. Only about eight percent of the typical building was made of wood, the rest usually being made of white limestone from Arcueil, Vaugirard or Meudon, and plaster from the gypsum mines under Montmartre and around the city.

Seventy-one percent of Paris residences had three rooms or less, usually a salon, a bedroom and a kitchen, the salon also serving as a dining room. But forty-five percent of residences did not have a separate kitchen; meals were prepared in the salon or bedroom. In the second half of the century, only 6.5 percent of apartments had a toilet or a bath.

=== Time, the work day and the daily meals ===
In the 18th century, the time of day or night in Paris was largely announced by the church bells; in 1789 there were 66 churches, 92 chapels, 13 abbeys and 199 convents, all of which rang their bells for regular services and prayers; sometimes a little early, sometimes a little late. A clock had also been installed in a tower of the palace on the Île de la Cité by Charles V in about 1370, and it also sounded the hour. Wealthy and noble Parisians began to have pocket watches, and needed a way to accurately set the time, so sundials appeared around the city. The best known-sundial was in the courtyard of the Palais-Royal. In 1750, the Duke of Chartres had a cannon installed there which, following the sundial, was fired precisely at noon each day.

The day of upper-class Parisians before the Revolution was described in the early 1780s by Sebastien Mercier in his Tableau de Paris. Deliveries of fresh produce by some three thousand farmers to the central market of Les Halles began at one in the morning, followed by the deliveries of fish and meat. At nine o'clock, the limonadiers served coffee and pastries to the first clients. At ten o'clock, the clerks and officials of the courts and administration arrived at work. At noon, the financiers, brokers and bankers took their places at the Bourse and in the financial district of the Saint-Honoré quarter. At two o'clock, work stopped in the financial markets and offices, and the Parisians departed for lunch, either at home or in restaurants. At five o'clock, the streets were again filled with people, as the wealthier Parisians went to the theater, or for promenades, or to cafés. The city was quiet until nine clock, when the streets filled again, as the Parisians made visits to friends. Dinner, or "souper" began between ten o'clock and eleven o'clock. It was also the hour when the prostitutes came out at the Palais-Royal and other heavily frequented streets. When the souper was finished, between eleven and midnight, most Parisians headed home, with others remained to gamble in the salons of the Palais-Royal. The work day for artisans and laborers was usually twelve hours, from about seven in the morning until seven in the evening, usually with a two-hour break at midday for rest and food.

The Revolution, and the disappearance of the aristocracy, completely changed the dining schedule of the Parisians, with all meals taking place earlier. In 1800, few Parisians had a late souper; instead they had their evening meal, or dîner, served between five and six instead of at ten or eleven, and the afternoon meal, formerly called dîner, was moved up to be served at about noon, and was called dejeuner.

=== Food and drink ===
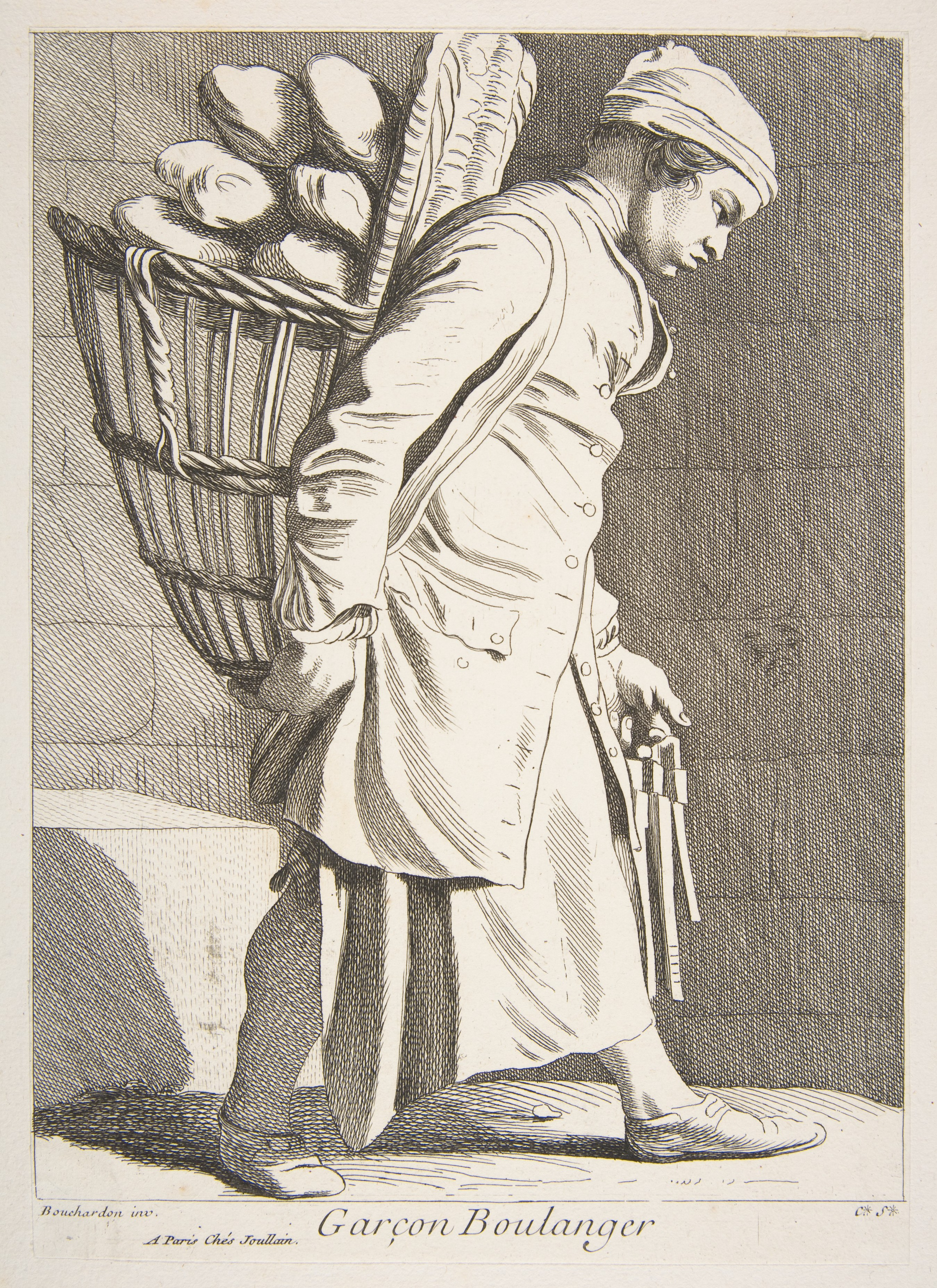
A baker's boy carrying loaves of bread (1737)

The basic diet of Parisians in the 18th century was bread, meat and wine. The bread was usually white bread, with a thick crust, good for dipping or soaking up a meat broth. `For the poor, bread was often the only staple of their diet; The Lieutenant-General of Police, from 1776 to 1785, Jean Lenoir, wrote: "for a large part of the population, the only nourishment is bread, vegetables and cheese." The government was well aware of the political dangers of a bread shortage, and closely regulated the supply, the price and the bakeries, but the system broke down in 1789, with disastrous results.

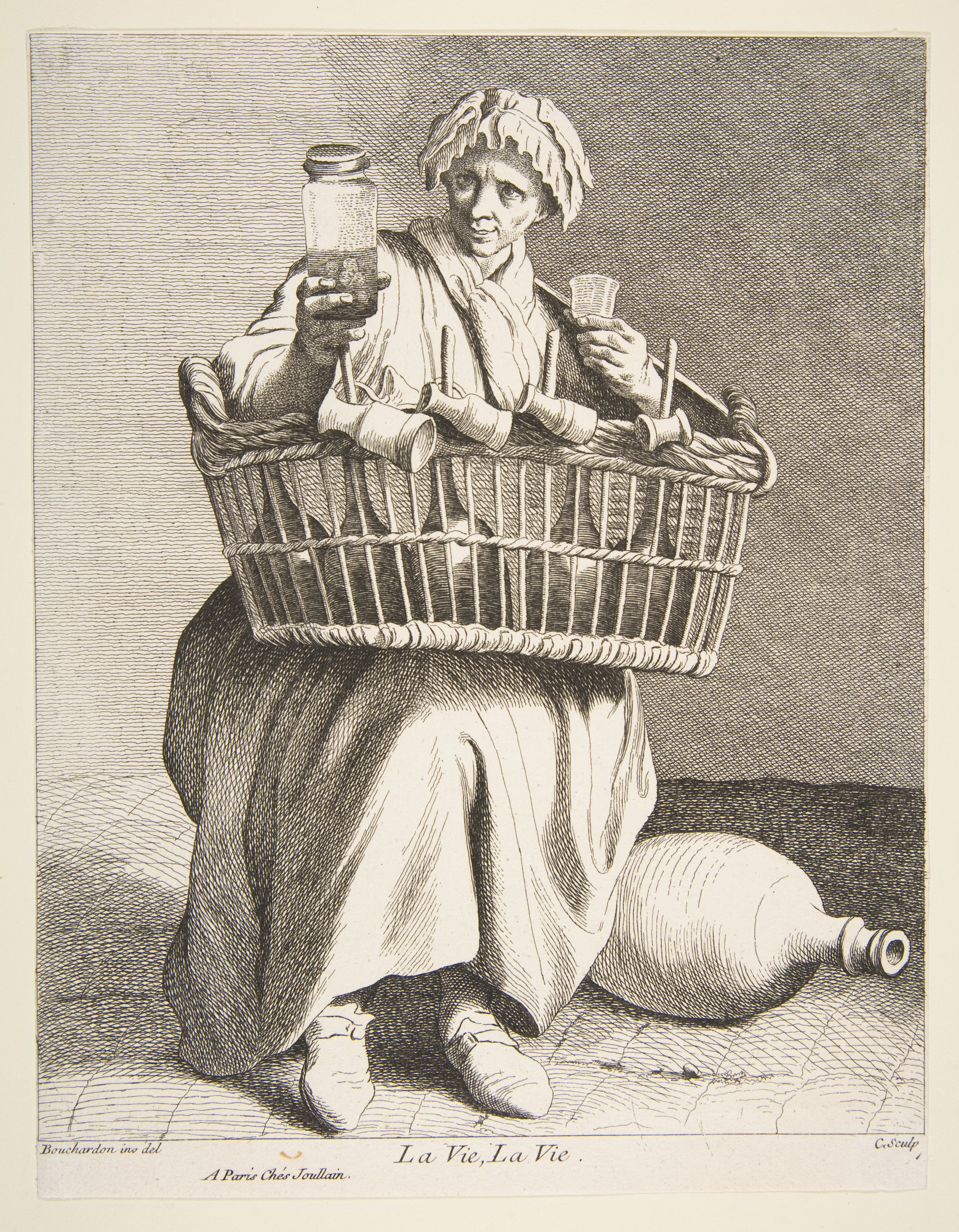
A street vendor selling eau-de-vie brandy (1737)

According to a contemporary study by the Enlightenment-era chemist Lavoisier, Parisians spent about twice as much on meat as they did on bread, which accounted for only about thirteen percent of their food budget. Butcher shops all around the city provided the meat; the animals were slaughtered in the courtyards behind the shops, and the blood often flowed out into the streets. The better cuts of meat went to aristocracy and the merchant class; poorer Parisians ate mutton and pork, sausages, andouilles, brains, tripe, salted pork, other inexpensive cuts. The uneaten meat from the tables of the upper class was carefully collected and sold by regrattiers who specialized in this trade.

Wine was the third basic component of the Parisian meal. Wealthier Parisians consumed wines brought from Bordeaux and Burgundy; the Parisian middle class and workers drank wines from regions all over France, usually brought in barrels by boat or by road. In 1725, there were an estimated 1,500 wine merchants in Paris. The royal government profited from the flood of wine coming to Paris by raising taxes, until wine was the most highly taxed product coming into the city in 1668, each barrel of wine entering Paris by land was taxed 15 livres, and 18 livres if it arrived by boat. By 1768, the government raised the taxes to 48 livres by land and 52 by water. To avoid the taxes, hundreds of taverns called guinguettes sprang up just outside the tax barriers on the edges of the city, at Belleville, Charonne, and new shanty-towns called La Petite-Pologne, Les Porcherons, and La Nouvelle-France. A pint of wine sold in these taverns was taxed 3.5 sous a pint, while the same amount was taxed 12 to 15 sous inside Paris. The tax was hated by the Parisians, and was an important cause of the growing hostility to the royal government before the Revolution.

=== Drinking water ===
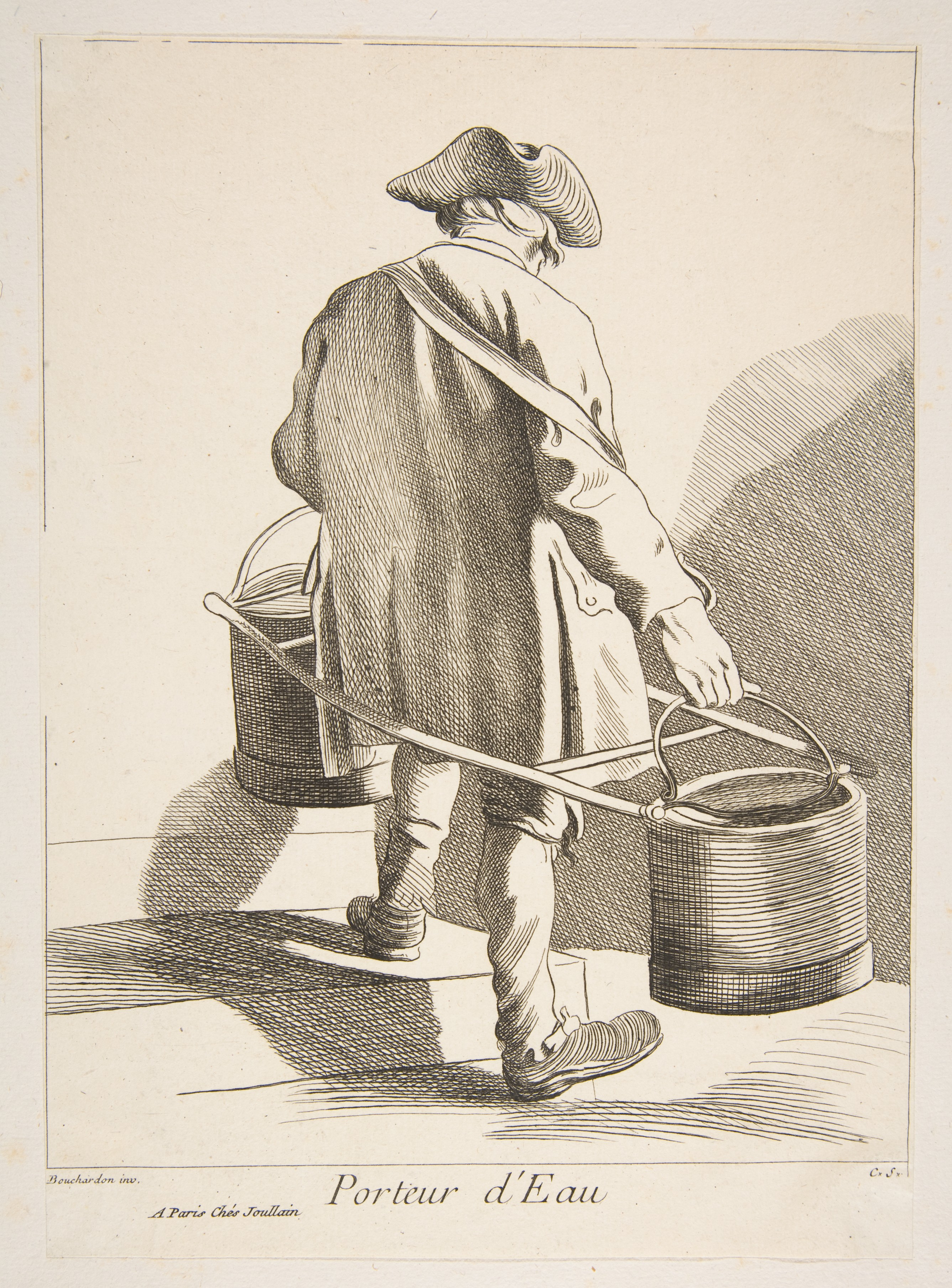
A Paris water-bearer (1737)

For obtaining drinking water, wealthier Parisians usually had wells in their residences, often in the basement. For ordinary Parisians, it was much more difficult. The water of the Seine had been polluted since the Middle Ages by the discharge of human and animal waste, the dumping of chemicals by the tanneries, and by the decomposition of bodies in the many cemeteries not far from the river. In the 18th century the Lieutenant General of Police banned taking drinking water from between the present Quai des Celestins and the modern quai de Louvre. Average Parisians depended upon the fountains around city, which were not numerous, did not run at night, were crowded, and required a payment for each bucket taken. Parisians either collected water themselves, sent a servant, or depended upon water bearers, men who carried covered buckets of water or rolled large barrels on wheels to the residence and charged a fee for the service. There were frequent fights at public fountains between water bearers and domestic servants, and water bearers were known to avoid paying the fee at fountains by simply taking the water from the Seine. In the 18th century, a few enterprising Parisians dug Artesian wells; one well at the École Militaire sent a jet of water eight to ten meters into the air; but the artesian well water was hot and had a poor taste. In 1776, the Perrier brothers started a business delivering three million liters a water a day using steam-powered pumps at Chaillot and Gros-Caillou. Facing the organized hostility of the water bearers, the company went bankrupt in 1788 and was taken over by the city. The water supply problem was not resolved until the First Empire, when Napoleon commissioned a canal from the Ourcq River.

=== Transportation ===
There was no public transportation in Paris in the 18th century; the only way for ordinary Parisians to move around the city was on foot, a difficult experience in the winding, crowded and narrow streets, especially in the rain or at night. The nobles and the wealthy traversed the city either on horseback or in chairs carried by servants. These chairs gradually were replaced by horse-drawn carriages, both private and for hire. By 1750, there were more than ten thousand carriages for hire in Paris, the first Paris taxis.

=== The Bateaux-Lavoirs ===
The Bateaux-Lavoirs were large flat-bottomed barges, protected by wooden or straw roofs, which were moored at designated places along the Seine and used by laundresses to wash laundry in the river. The laundresses paid the owners a fee for the use of the boat. There were some eighty of them in 1714; groups of six, moored two by two, were anchored across from Notre Dame, near the Pont Saint-Michel, and near the rue de l'Hôtel-Colbert. They preferred to be on the right bank, so the sunshine could dry the laundry.

=== The floating baths ===
In the 18th century only the nobility and wealthy had bathtubs in their homes, at the Marais and Faubourg Saint-Germain, the fashionable districts of the time. Other Parisians either did not bathe at all, bathed with a bucket, or went to one of the public bath houses, which provided hot tubs of water for a fee. They were heavily taxed by the government, and only a dozen survived until the end of the century. The more popular alternative, especially in summer, was bathing in the river from one of the large flat-bottomed bathing barges which were moored along the Seine, particularly on the right bank between the Cours-la-Reine and the Pont Marie. They were mostly former lumber barges, which were covered with wooden or straw roofs. Bathers paid an admission charge, then went down wooden steps from the barge into the river. Wooden pilings marked the limits of the bathing area, there were ropes to the pilings for the assistance of the numerous bathers who couldn't swim. In 1770, there were twenty such bathing barges, located at the Cours-la-Reine, the quai du Louvre, the quai Conti, across from the Palais-Bourbon, and at the western end of the Île-de-la-Cité, an establishment opened by the Canons of Notre-Dame. There were separate barges for men and women, and the bathers were offered bathing costumes for rent, but many preferred to bathe nude, men frequently swam into the women's area or swam along the river in full view of the people on riverbank. In 1723, the Lieutenant-General of Police condemned the baths as an offense to public morality and urged that they be moved from the center of the city, but they were popular and remained. In 1783, the police finally restricted bathing in the river during the day, but bathing at night was still allowed.

=== The press, the pamphlet and the post ===
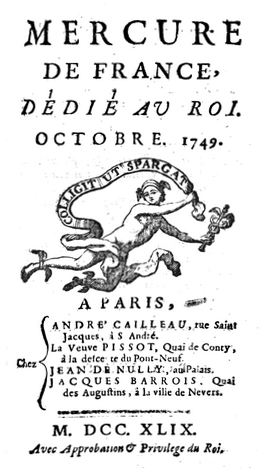
The Mercure de France issue of October 1749, dedicated to the King

The first daily newspaper in the city, the Journal de Paris, began publication on 1 January 1777. It was four pages long, printed on small sheets of paper, and focused on local news, and what was allowed by the royal censors. The press did not emerge as a force in Parisian life until 1789 and the Revolution, when censorship was abolished. Serious publications, such as the Journal des Débats appeared, along with thousands of short pamphlets, addressing the current topics of the day, and often virulent in their language. The period of press freedom did not last for long; in 1792 Robespierre and the Jacobins restored censorship and closed opposition newspapers and printing houses. Strict censorship was retained by governments that followed. Freedom of the press was not restored until the second half of the 19th century.

Several weekly and monthly magazines appeared in the early 18th century; the Mercure de France, originally called the Mercure Gallant, had first been published as an annual journal in 1611. An advertisement for an essay contest in the magazine in 1749 inspired Jean-Jacques Rousseau to write his first important essay, "Discourse on the Arts and Sciences" which brought him to public attention. The Journal des Savants, first published in 1665, circulated the news of new scientific discoveries. Near the end of the century, Paris journalists and printers produced a wide range of speciality publications, on fashion, for children, and on medicine, history, and science. In addition to the official publications of the Catholic church, there was a clandestine religious journal, the Nouvelles Eccléstiastiques, first printed in 1728, which circulated the ideas of the Jansenists, a sect denounced by the church. Through the journals, the ideas and discoveries made in Paris were circulated around France and across Europe.

In the beginning of the 18th century Paris had a very rudimentary postal service, which had been established in 1644 to carry letters by horseback couriers to other cities in France or abroad, but there was no postal service within the city itself; Parisians had to send a domestic or deliver the letter themselves. In 1758, a private company, called the Petite Poste, was organized to deliver letters within the city, in imitation of the "penny post" in London. It began to function in 1760; a letter cost two sous, and there were three distributions a day. It was successful, with nine bureaus, with twenty to thirty mailmen per bureau, and five hundred mail boxes around the city. By 1787, there were two hundred mailmen making ten rounds of delivery each day

== Amusements ==
=== Parks, promenades and pleasure gardens ===
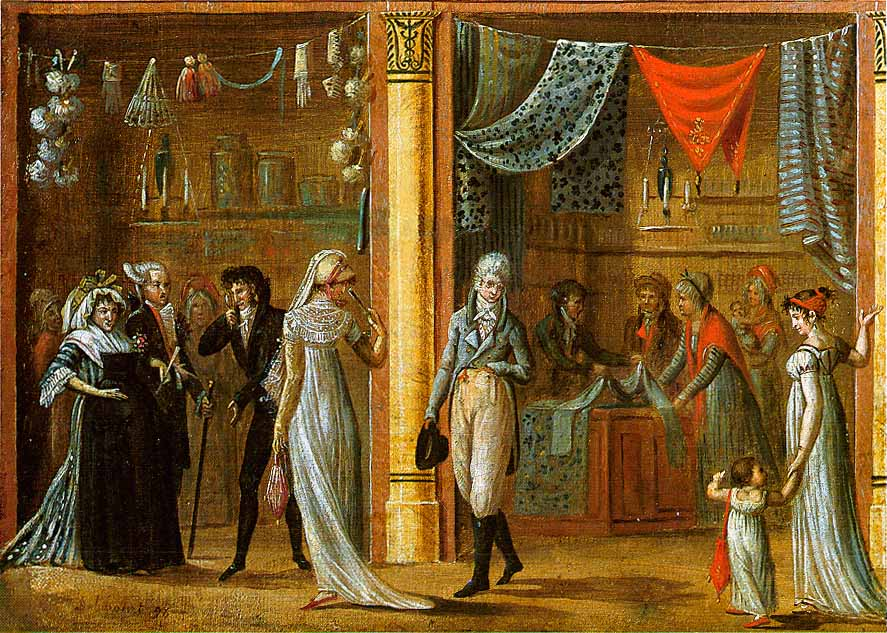
A promenade in the Palais-Royal (1798)

One of the chief amusements of the Parisians was to promenade, to see and be seen in the gardens and public places. There were three gardens open to the public in the 18th century; the Tuileries Gardens, the Luxembourg Garden, under the windows of the royal palace; and the Jardin des Plantes. There was a no admission charge, and there were often concerts and other entertainment.

It was difficult to promenade in the narrow streets, crowded, without sidewalks and filled with wagons, carts, carriages and animals. At the beginning of the century Parisians preferred to promenade on the wide Pont Neuf. As the century advanced, they were attracted to the new boulevards, built on the site of the old city walls, and to the new Champs-Élysées, where the first large town houses were being constructed. As the boulevards attracted crowds, they also attracted street entertainers; acrobats, musicians, dancers, and every kind of trained animal performed on the sidewalks.

The end of the 18th century saw the opening of the pleasure gardens of Ranelegh, Vauxhall, and Tivoli. These were large private gardens where, in summer, Parisians paid an admission charge and found food, music, dancing, and other entertainment, from pantomime to magic lantern shows and fireworks. The admission fee was relatively high; the owners of the gardens wanted to attract a more upper class clientele, and to keep out the more boisterous Parisians who thronged the boulevards.

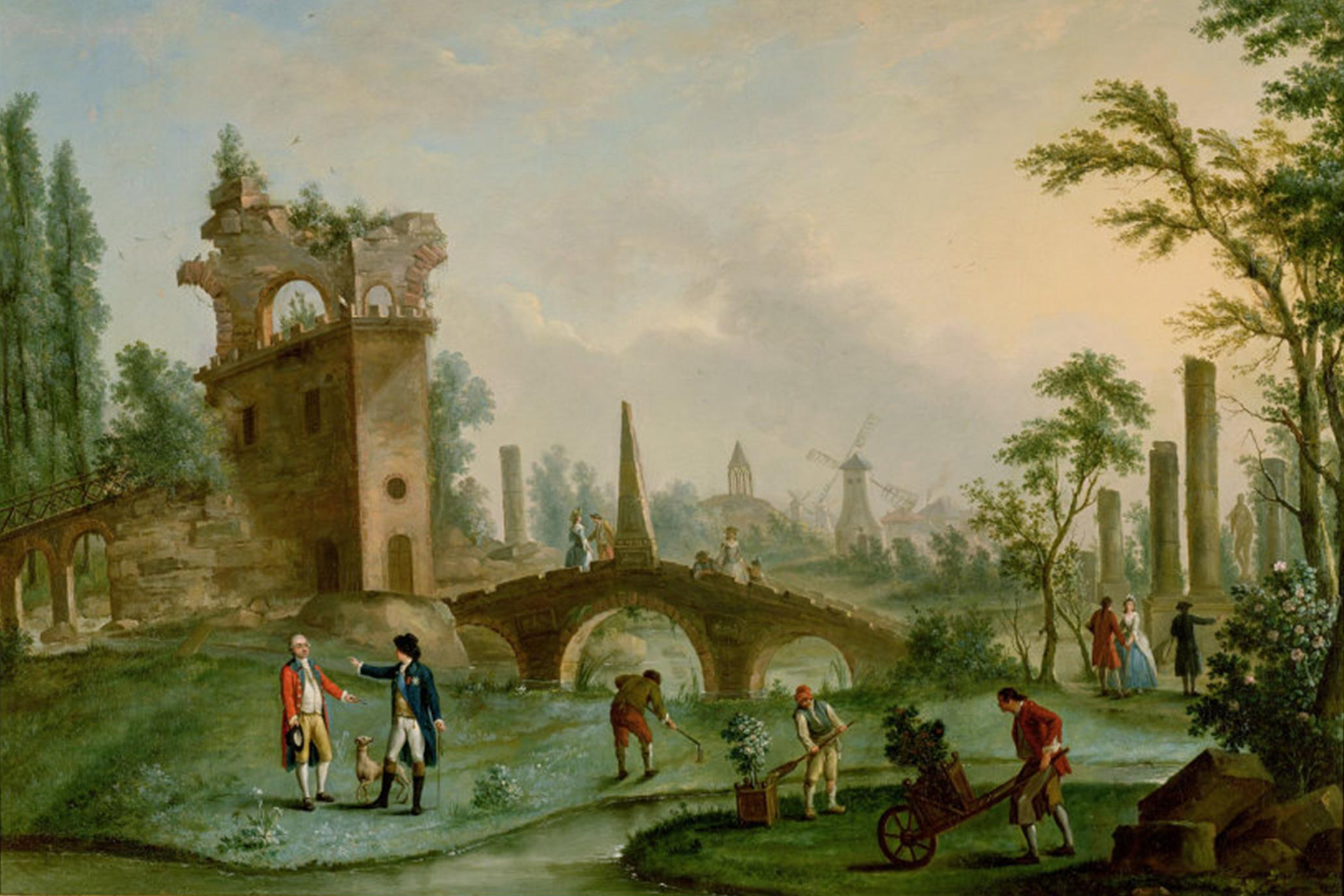
Parc Monceau in 1790

The most extravagant pleasure garden was Parc Monceau, created by Louis Philippe II, Duke of Orléans, which opened in 1779. it was designed for the Duke by the painter Carmontelle. It contained a miniature Egyptian pyramid, a Roman colonnade, antique statues, a pond of water lilies, a tatar tent, a farmhouse, a Dutch windmill, a temple of Mars, a minaret, an Italian vineyard, an enchanted grotto, and "a gothic building serving as a chemistry laboratory," as described by Carmontelle. In addition to the follies, the garden featured servants dressed in oriental and other exotic costumes, and unusual animals, such as camels. In 1781, parts of the garden were transformed into a more traditional English landscape garden, but vestiges of the original follies, including the pyramid and colonnade, can still be seen.

By far the most popular destination for promenaders in the late 18th century was the Palais-Royal, the most ambitious project of the Duke of Orléans. Between 1780 and 1784 he rebuilt his family gardens into a pleasure garden surrounded by wide covered arcades, which were occupied by shops, art galleries, and the first true restaurants in Paris. There was a pavilion in the gardens for horseback riding; The basements were occupied by popular cafes with drinks and musical entertainment, and the upper floors by rooms for card-playing and gambling. At night, the galleries and gardens became the most popular meeting place between prostitutes and their clients.

=== Bouillons and restaurants ===
For centuries, Paris had taverns which served food at large common tables, but they were notoriously crowded, noisy, not very clean, and served food of dubious quality. In about 1765 a new kind of eating establishment, called a "Bouillon", was opened on rue des Poulies, near the Louvre, by a man named Boulanger. It had separate tables, a menu, and specialized in soups made with a base of meat and eggs, which were said to be "restaurants" or ways of restoring oneself. Dozens of bouillons soon appeared on Paris streets.

The first luxury restaurant in Paris, called the Taverne Anglaise, was opened by Antoine Beauvilliers, the former chef of the Count of Provence, at the Palais-Royal. It had mahogany tables, linen tablecloths, chandeliers, well-dressed and trained waiters, a long wine list and an extensive menu of elaborately prepared and presented dishes. A rival restaurant was started in 1791 by Méot, the former chef of the Louis Philippe II, Duke of Orléans, by the end of the century there were other luxury restaurants at the Grand-Palais; Huré, the Couvert espagnol; Février; the Grotte flamande; Véry, Masse and the cafe des Chartres (now the Grand Vefour).

=== Cafés ===
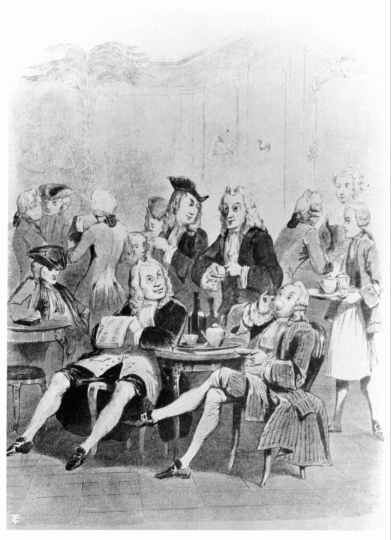
The Café de Procope in 1743

Coffee had been introduced to Paris in 1644, and the first café opened in 1672, but the institution did not become successful until the opening of Café Procope in about 1689 in rue des Fossés-Saint-Germain, close to the Comédie-Française, which had just moved to that location. The café served coffee, tea, chocolate, liqueurs, ice cream and confiture in a luxurious setting. The Café Procope was frequented by Voltaire (when he was not in exile), Jean-Jacques Rousseau, Diderot and D'Alembert. Cafés became important centers for exchanging news, rumors and ideas, often more reliable than the newspapers of the day. In 1723, there were about 323 cafés in Paris; by 1790 there were more than 1,800. They were places for meeting friends, and for literary and political discussion. As Hurtaut and Magny wrote in their Dictionnaire de Paris in 1779: "One gets the news there, either by conversation, or by reading the newspapers. You don't have to encounter anyone with bad morals, no loud persons, no soldiers, no domestics, no one who could trouble the tranquility of society." Women rarely entered cafés, but women of the nobility sometimes stopped their carriages outside and were served inside the carriage with cups on silver platters. During the Revolution the cafés turned into centers of furious political discussion and activity, often led by members of the Revolutionary clubs.

=== The Guingette ===
The Guingette was mentioned as early as 1723 in the Dictionaire du commerce of Savary. It was a type of tavern located just outside the city limits of Paris, where wine and other drinks were taxed less and were much cheaper. They were open Sundays and holidays, usually had musicians for dancing, and attracted large crowds of working-class Parisians eager for rest and recreation after the work week. As time went on, they also attracted middle class Parisians with their families.

=== Dancing – the masked ball ===
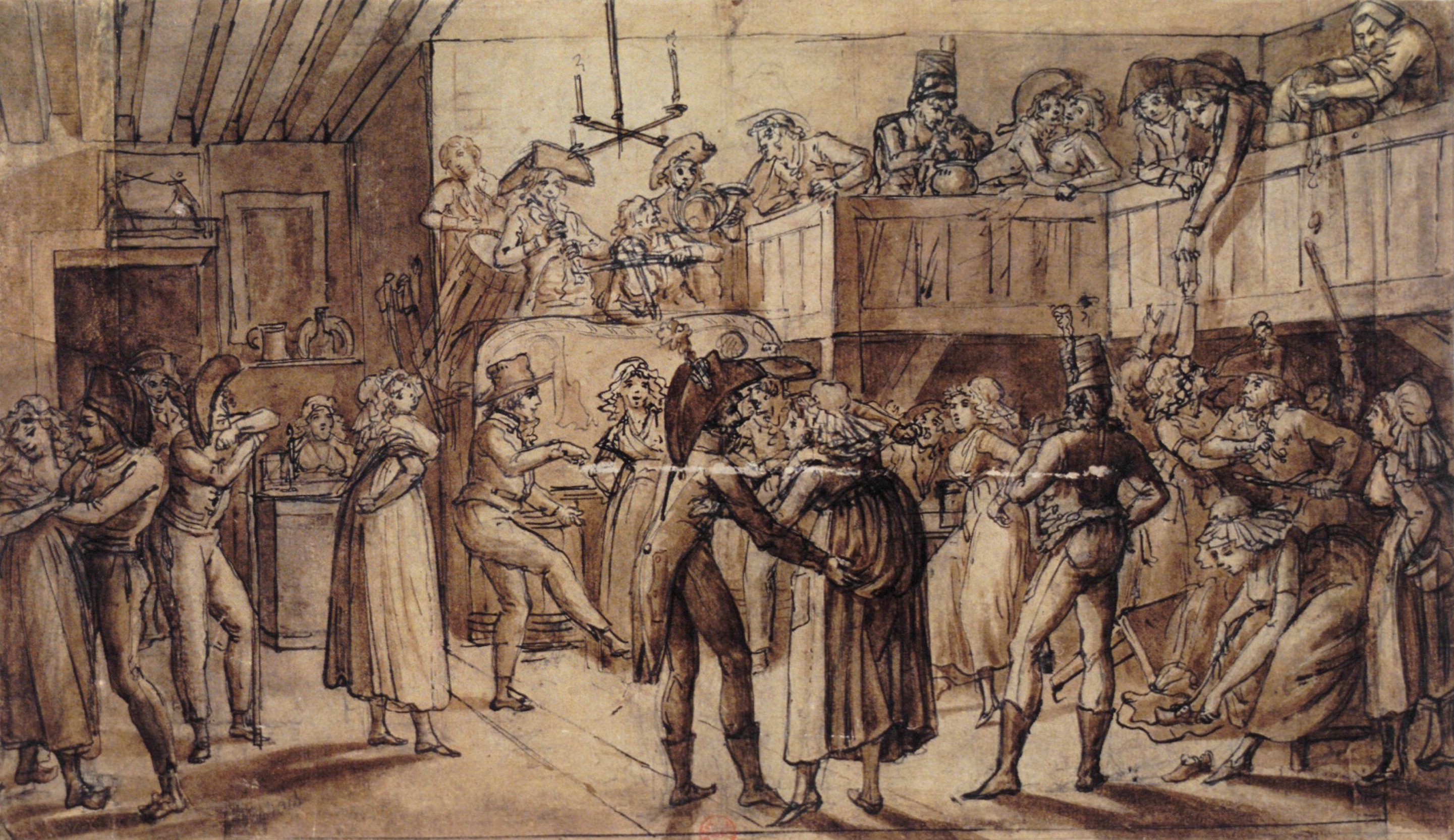
Ball for servants on rue du Mont-Blanc (1799)

Public balls were banned on moral grounds during the last years of the reign of Louis XIV, and were not permitted again until under the Regency. At this time a royal ordinance of 31 December 1715 authorized the first public balls in the city. These were the famous masked balls of the Paris Opera, which took place on Thursdays, Saturdays and Sundays beginning on the day of Saint Martin and continuing until Carnival.

== Culture ==
=== Theater ===
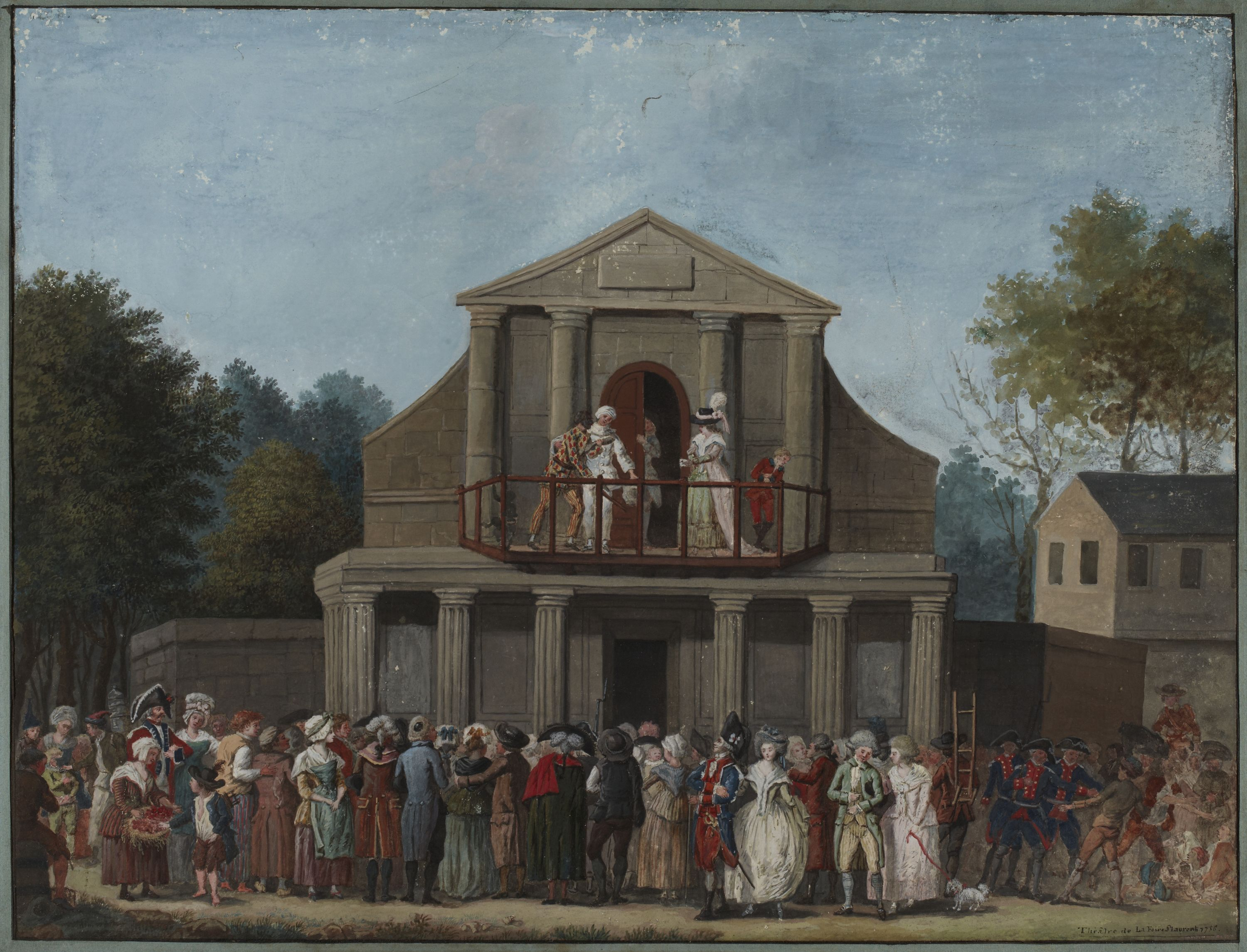
The theater of Nicolet on the Boulevard du Temple (1786)

Theater was an increasingly popular form of entertainment for the Parisians throughout the 18th century. The number of theater seats grew from about four thousand in 1700 to 13,000 in 1789. In 1760, the boulevard du Temple became the main theater street of Paris, with the opening by Nicolet of the Théâtre des Grands Danseurs de Roi, which later became the Théâtre de la Gaîeté. In 1770, the Ambigu-Comique opened on the same street, followed in 1784 by the Théâtre des Élèves de l'Opéra, also known as the Lycée Dramatique. In 1790, the Théâtre des Variétés-Amusantes, originally located on rue de Bondy, moved to the same neighborhood, to the corner of the rue Richelieu and the Palais-Royal. In 1790. The boulevard du Temple and eventually took the name of the "Boulevard du Crime" because of all of the melodramas that played in the theaters there. Another new theater was opened in 1784 at the northwest corner of the Palais-Royal; it was used first by the company of the Count of the Beaujolais, then by the actress Mademoiselle Montansier. The Comédiens Italiens moved in 1783 to the Salle Favert. On the left bank, the Odéon Theater opened in 1782.

The most successful Paris playwright was Pierre Beaumarchais who first put on stage the Le Barbier de Séville in 1775 in the Tuileries Palace, performed by the Comédie Française. It was followed by Le Mariage de Figaro, which was accepted for production by the management of the Comédie Française in 1781, but at private reading before the French court the play so shocked King Louis XVI that he forbade its public presentation. Beaumarchais revised the text, moving the action from France to Spain, and, after more changes, it was finally allowed to be staged. It opened at the Théâtre Français on 27 April 1784 and ran for 68 consecutive performances, earning the highest box-office receipts of any French play of the eighteenth century.

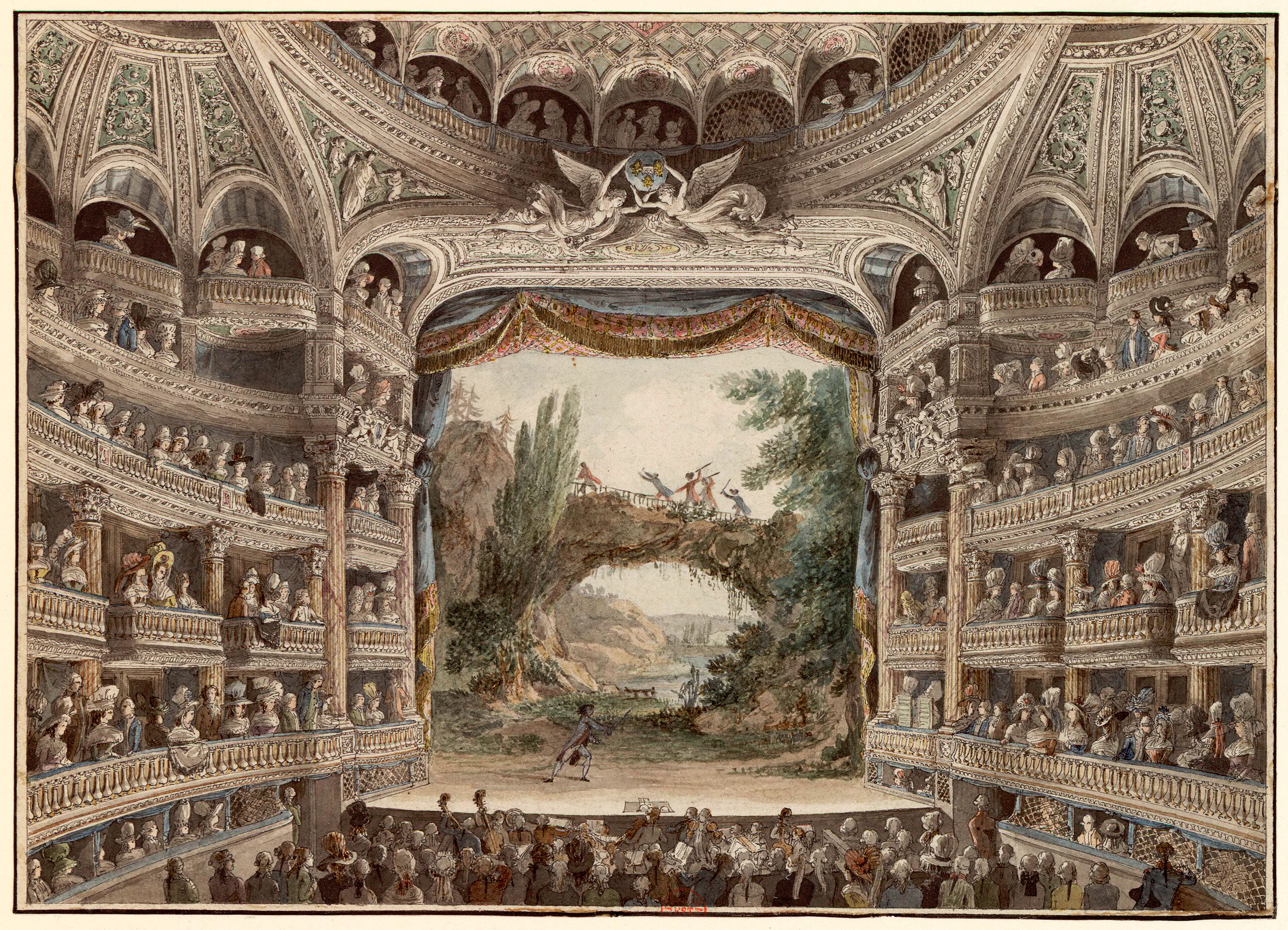
A performance of the Comedie-Française in the late 18th century

The most famous of Paris theater companies, the Comédie-Francaise, was located since 1689 on the rue des Fossés-Saint-Germain-des-Prés (now 14 rue de l'Ancienne-Comédie). In 1770, because of the decrepitude of their old theater, they were forced to move to the hall of machines of the Tuileries Palace. The hall was too large and not adapted to their style of theater, so they moved back to the left bank to the Odéon Theater. With the arrival of the Revolution, the theater company split in two; the actors who were sympathetic to the monarchy remained in place, but on 3 September 1793, after a performance of a play called Paméla ou la Vertu récompensé by François de Neufchâteau, which the more radical Jacobins felt was counter-revolutionary, the theater was closed. The actors were arrested and barely escaped the guillotine. The actors who were more sympathetic to the Revolution, led by the actor François-Joseph Talma, had installed themselves in a new theater next to the Palais-Royal, built by the architect Victor Louis between 1786 and 1790. They performed first under the name of the Théatre de la Liberté et de la Égalité, then under the name Théatre de la Republique; under the Consulate the scripts of their plays were carefully scrutinized by a Commissaire of the government, to assure they did not contain political messages. The political differences of the actors were eventually put aside, the two troupes rejoined into one company, and established themselves in the theater which is still the home of the Comédie-Française today.

=== Painting and sculpture ===
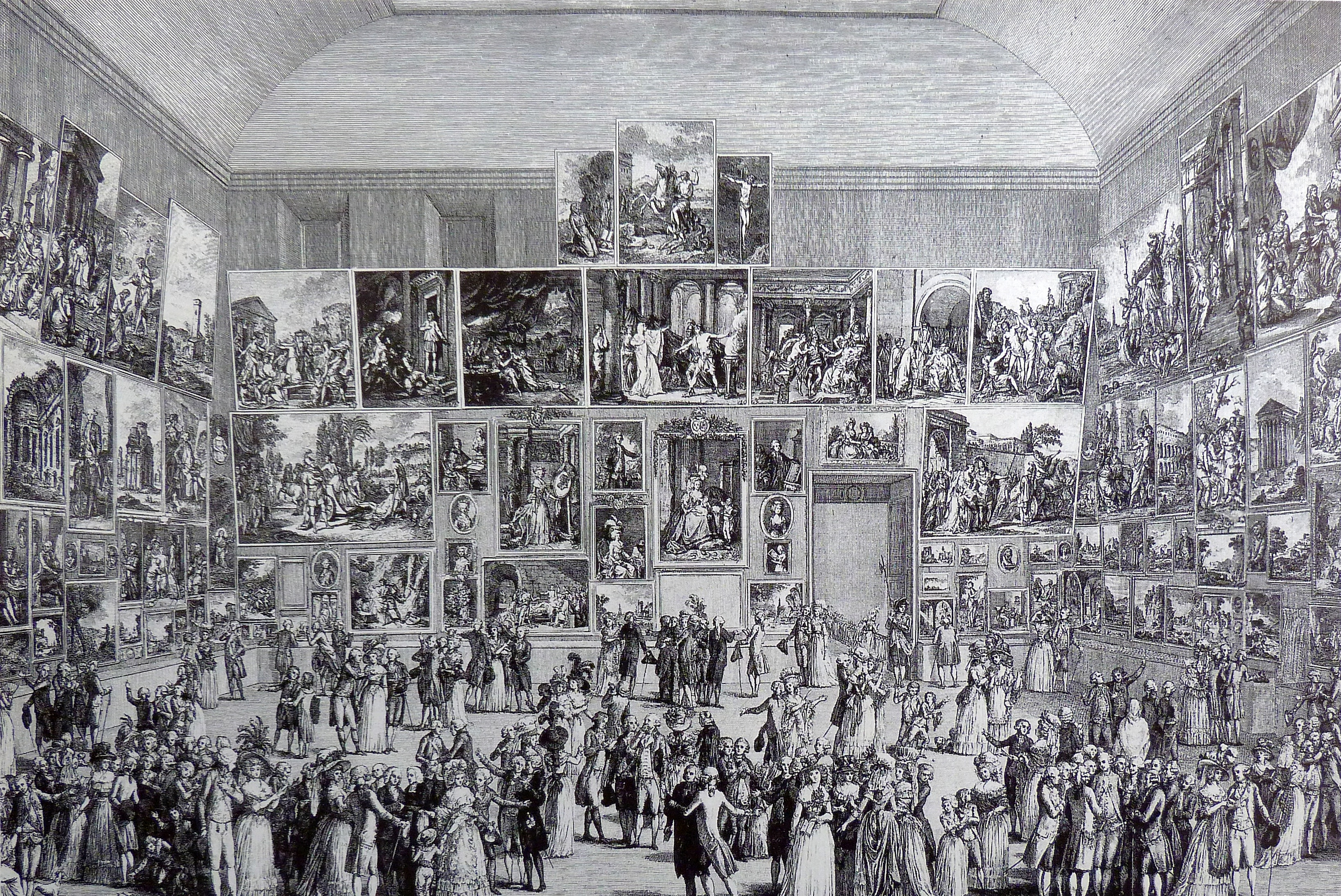
The Paris Salon of 1787, by Pierre Antonio Martini

Paris produced two important painters at the beginning of the 18th century; Jean-Baptiste Chardin and François Boucher; and two more at the end of the century, Hubert Robert and Jacques Louis David. Other notable painters, including Maurice Quentin de la Tour, Jean-Baptiste Greuze, Joseph Vernet and Jean-Honoré Fragonard came to Paris from the provinces and achieved success. The Académie royale de peinture et de sculpture (Royal Academy of Painting and Sculpture) had been founded under Louis XIV, and from 1667 until 1791 it organized the major artistic event, the Salon, held every two years. It opened on 25 August, the day of Saint Louis, in honor of the King, and lasted for several weeks. In the 18th century was held in the Salon Carré of the Louvre (which gave the Salon its name) and gradually expanded over the years to the Gallery of Apollo. At the Salon of 1761, thirty-three painters, nine sculptors, and eleven engravers contributed. Until 1791, it was limited to members of the Academy, and as many as five hundred paintings were shown at each Salon. On August 8, 1793, the Academy was suspended by the revolutionary National Convention, which decreed the abolition of all the royal artistic and literary academies.

During the Revolution, Jacques Louis David, a friend of Robespierre and a member of the radical Jacobin club, became the unofficial minister of propaganda of the Revolution. He created a series of paintings associating the French Revolution with the virtues of the ancient Rome, and designing costumes and pageants for the Revolutionary government. After the fall of Robespierre, he was imprisoned, freed, and at the beginning of the 19th century was painting portraits of Napoleon Bonaparte.

=== Literature ===
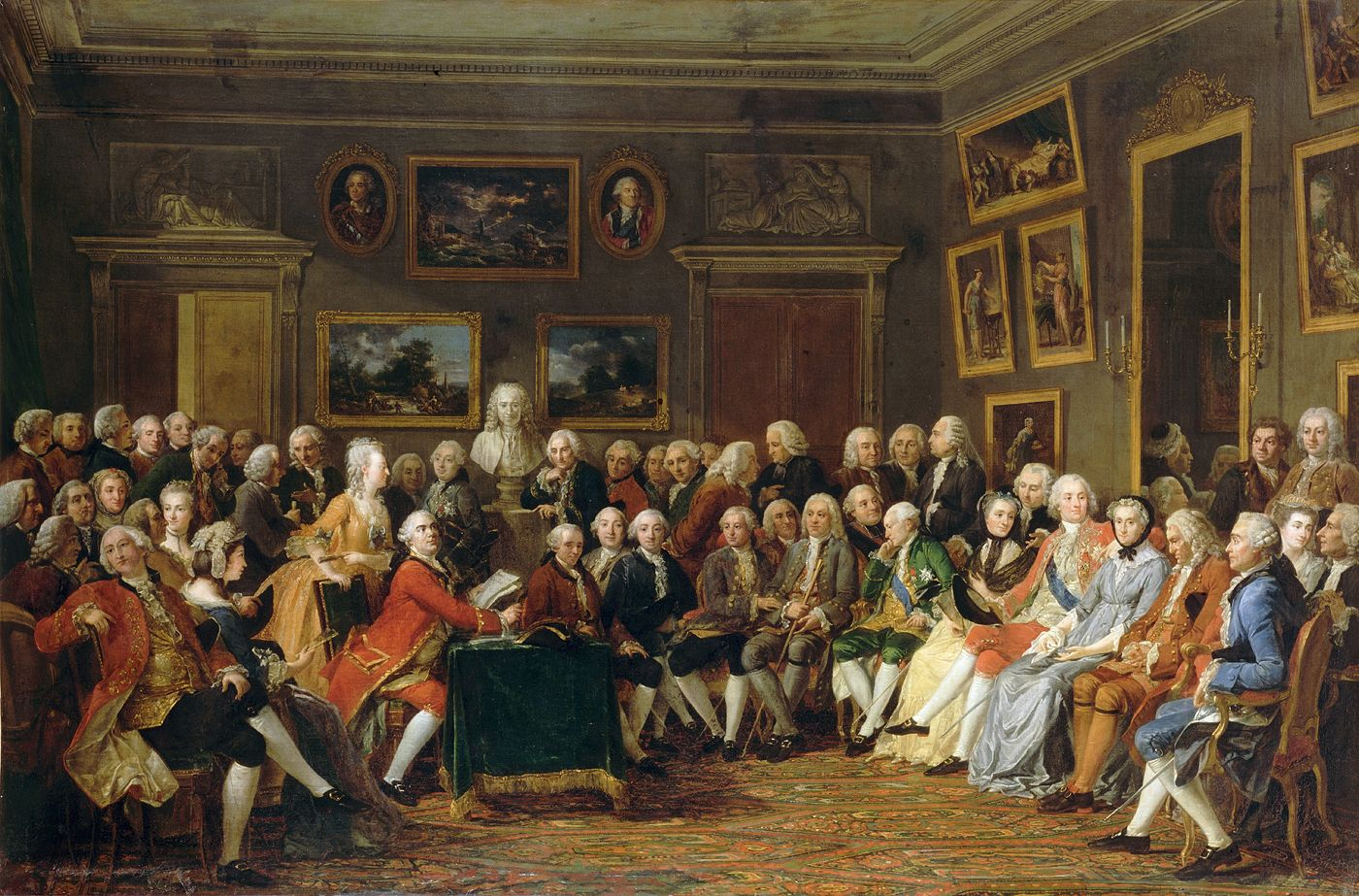
In the Salon of Madame Geoffrin in 1755 by Anicet Charles Gabriel Lemonnier, 1812. A reading of a work by Voltaire in the salon of Madame Geoffrin

Of the great French writers of the 18th century, the two most famous, Voltaire and Jean-Jacques Rousseau, spent most of their careers far from Paris, either in exile or under strict censorship. Early in his career Voltaire had enjoyed the promotion of the Queen Marie Leczinska (wife of Louis XV) whom she meet on her wedding festivities with the young Louis XV in 1725 and later on granted a government pension, which he did not touch for twelve years; the scholar and co-author of the first Encyclopedia, d'Alembert had been provided an apartment in the Louvre; and Rousseau had been feted and welcomed to the homes of the nobility. But under Louis XVI the royal attitudes changed. Voltaire very rarely visited Paris between 1760 and his death in 1784. Rousseau was allowed to return to Paris from exile only on the condition that he not publish any of his work. Nonetheless, the writing of both men was widely read, usually in clandestine editions, and shaped the ideas that led to the Revolution.

In the first half of the 18th century, eminent French writers were invited to become members of the Académie Française, but the Academy in practice served largely to glorify the royal family and to keep writers under gentle control, rather to stimulate innovation in literature. Neither Rousseau nor Voltaire were chosen; only one of the great Philosophes of the enlightenment, Montesquieu, was elected a member. His 1748 book The Spirit of the Laws, proposing a separation of powers between the executive, legislature and courts, had an enormous impact on political thinking outside France, especially in England and the United States.

Despite censorship and restrictions, Paris was the leading book-publishing center of Europe, and provided books not only to France, but exported them to all the courts and aristocracies of Europe, where French was widely spoken. The plays of Voltaire, Pierre Beaumarchais and Pierre de Marivaux; the novels of Choderlos de Laclos (Les Liaisons dangereuses), Antoine François Prévost (Manon Lescaut) and the poetry of Jacques Delille and Évariste de Parny were read in all the major cities of the continent, as far away as Saint Petersburg.

An important feature of the Paris literary world was the literary salon, where wives of the nobility invited their friends to their homes to hear readings of new books and to discuss literature, and, later in the century, politics. The first famous Paris salon of the 18th century was that of Madame de Lambert in her town house on rue Richelieu in 1710, followed by those of Madames de Tencin, Geoffrin, Du Deffand, d'Épinay, Helvétius, and Necker. The Revolution brought an abrupt end to the literary salons, as the aristocrats were executed or forced into exile, and some of the most promising writers, including the poet André Chenier, went to the guillotine.

== The Enlightenment ==
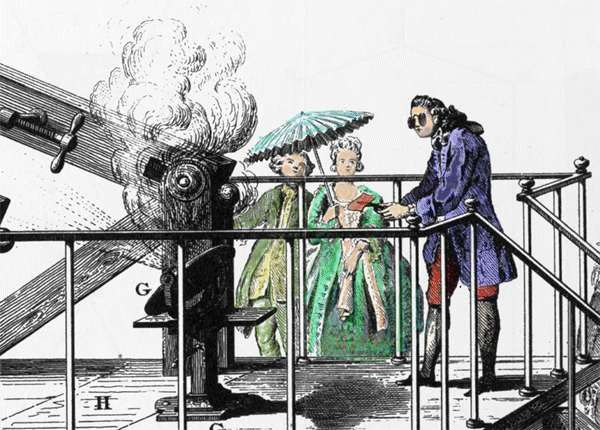
Antoine Lavoisier conducting an experiment related to combustion generated by amplified sun light (1770s)

In the mid-18th century, Paris became the center of an explosion of philosophic and scientific activity known as the Age of Enlightenment. The philosophic movement was led by Voltaire and Jean-Jacques Rousseau, who argued for a society based upon reason rather than faith and Catholic dogma, and for a new civil order based on natural law, and for science based on experiments and observation. The political philosopher Montesquieu introduced the idea of a separation of powers in a government, a concept which was enthusiastically adopted by the authors of the United States Constitution.

Much of the activity was based at the Louvre, where the French Academy of Sciences, founded in 1666, was located; it had separate sections for geometry, astronomy, mechanics, anatomy, chemistry and botany. Under Louis XVI, the 18th century, new sections were added on physics, natural history and mineralogy. The biologist and natural historian Georges-Louis Leclerc, Comte de Buffon directed the Jardin des Plantes, and made it a leading center for botanic research. The mathematicians Joseph-Louis Lagrange, Jean-Charles de Borda, and Pierre-Simon Laplace; the botanist René Louiche Desfontaines, the chemists Claude Louis Berthollet, Antoine François, comte de Fourcroy and Antoine Lavoisier, all contributed to the new scientific revolution taking place in Paris.

The new ideas and discoveries were publicized throughout Europe by the large number of book publishers in Paris. Between 1720 and 1780, the number of books about science and art doubled, while the number of books about religion dropped to just one-tenth of the total. Denis Diderot and Jean le Rond d'Alembert published their Encyclopedie in seventeen volumes between 1751 and 1766. It provided intellectuals across Europe with a high quality survey of human knowledge. Scientists came to Paris from across Europe and from the United States to share ideas; Benjamin Franklin came in 1766 to meet with Voltaire and to talk about his experiments with electricity.

=== Inventions ===
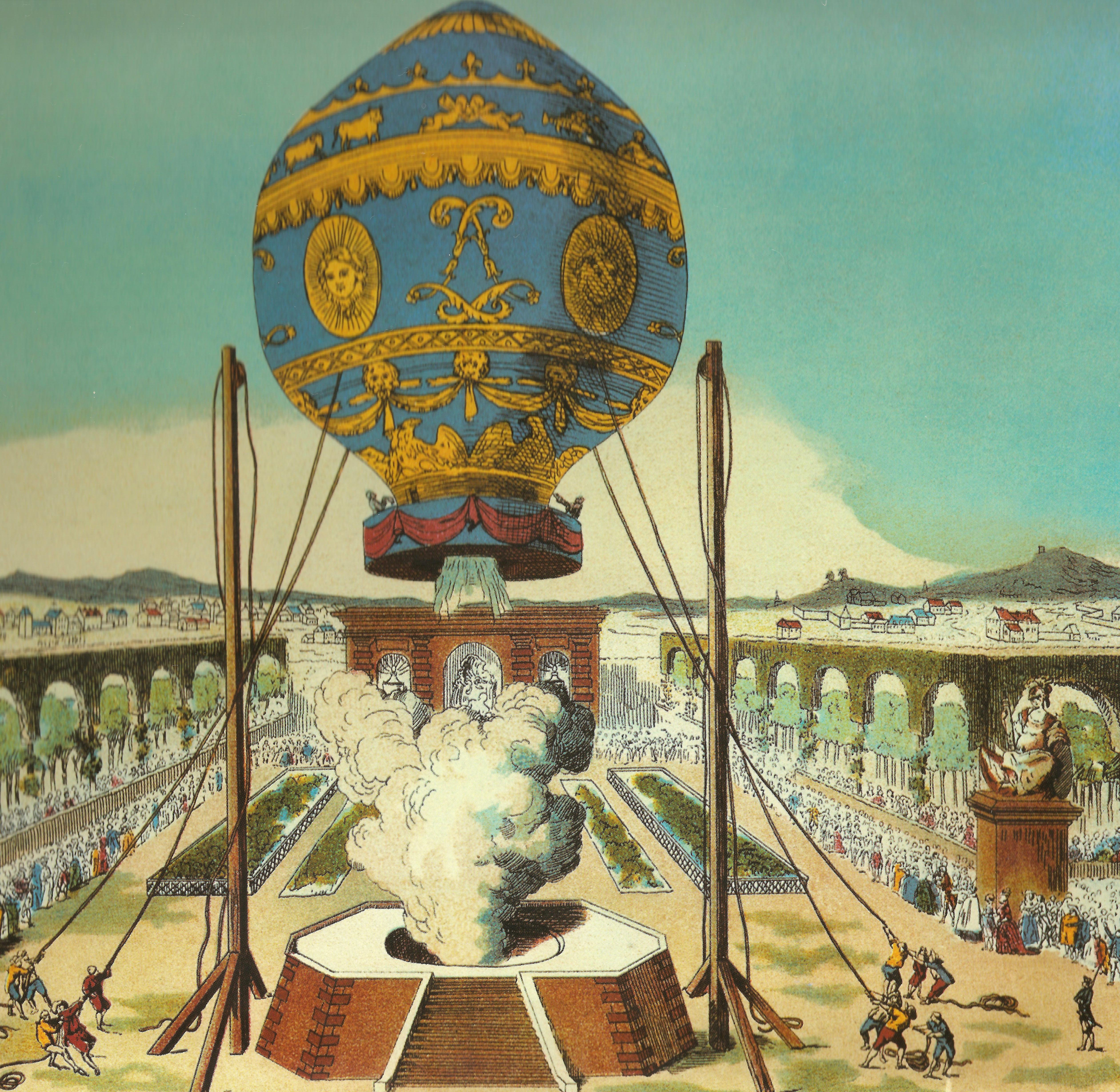
The first manned balloon flight, 21 November 1783, at the Château de la Muette

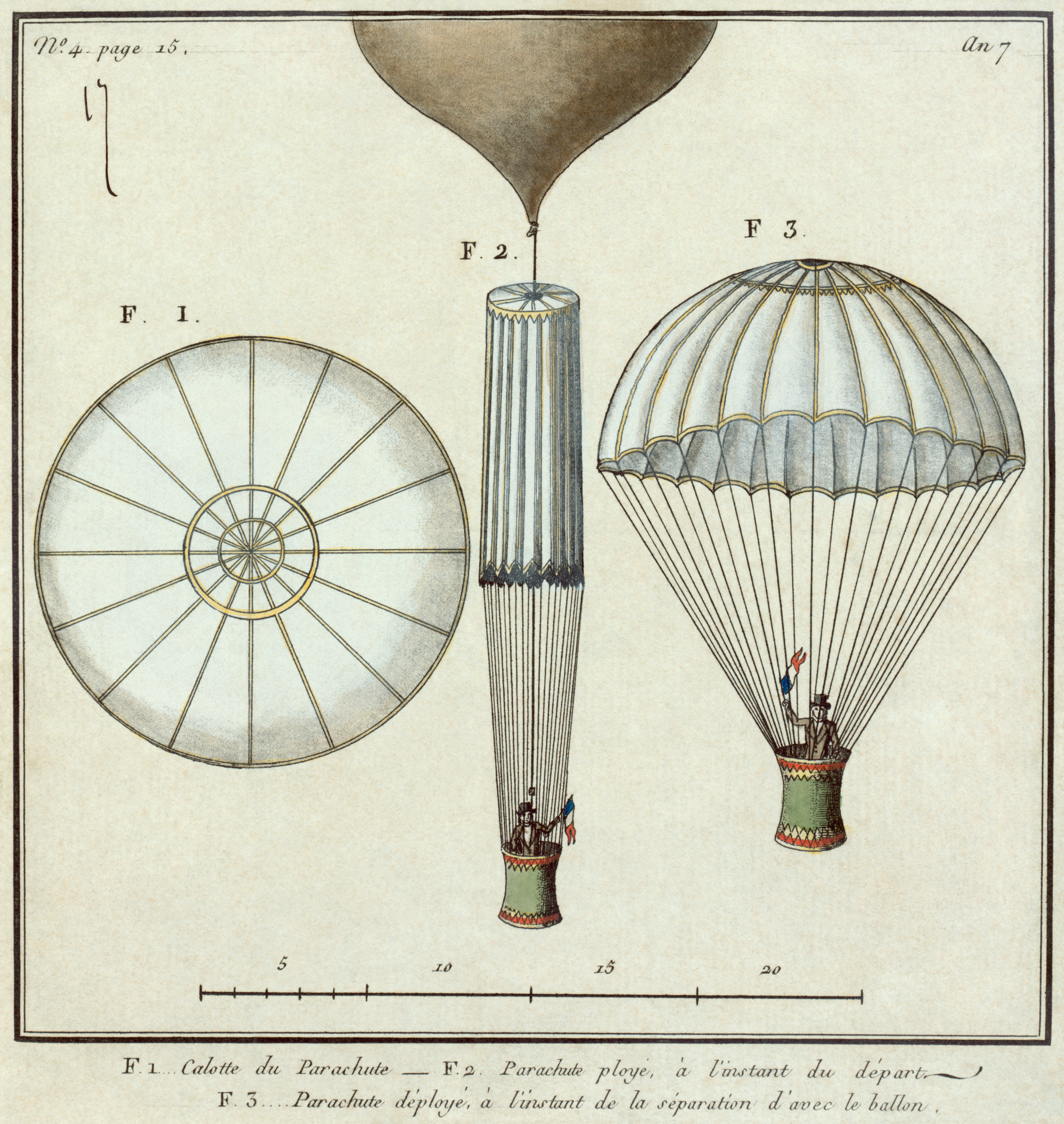
A drawing of the first frameless parachute, tested by André-Jacques Garnerin above Parc Monceau on 22 October 1797.

The 18th century in Paris was a particularly inventive period. Some of the discoveries of Paris scientists, particularly in the field of chemistry, were quickly put to practical use; the experiments of Lavoisier were used to create the first modern chemical plants in Paris, and the production of hydrogen gas enabled the Montgolfier Brothers to launch the first manned flight in a hot-air balloon on 21 November 1783, from the Château de la Muette, near the Bois de Boulogne.

The invention of the balloon led directly to the invention of the parachute. André-Jacques Garnerin, who had flown in a Montgolfier balloon in 1790, wanted to find a vehicle by which a pilot could abandon a balloon in case of an accident. On 22 October 1797 he made the first descent with a frameless silk parachute, dropping from a balloon seven hundred meters above Parc Monceau. On 10 November 1798 his future wife, Jeanne-Genevieve Labrousse, became the first woman to ascend alone in a balloon, and the first woman to make a parachute jump.

A more modest but highly useful invention, the folding umbrella, was introduced in 1710 by a Paris merchant named Jean Marius, with his shop at the barrier of Saint-Honoré. He obtained a monopoly on the manufacture of umbrellas which opened and closed like modern models, and weighed less than one kilogram. A model was purchased in 1712 by the Princess Palatine, who wrote about it to her friends and helped make it a popular fashion item. An important improvement was reported to the French Academy of Sciences in 1759; an umbrella combined with a cane, with a small button the side to open the umbrella.

== Urbanism ==
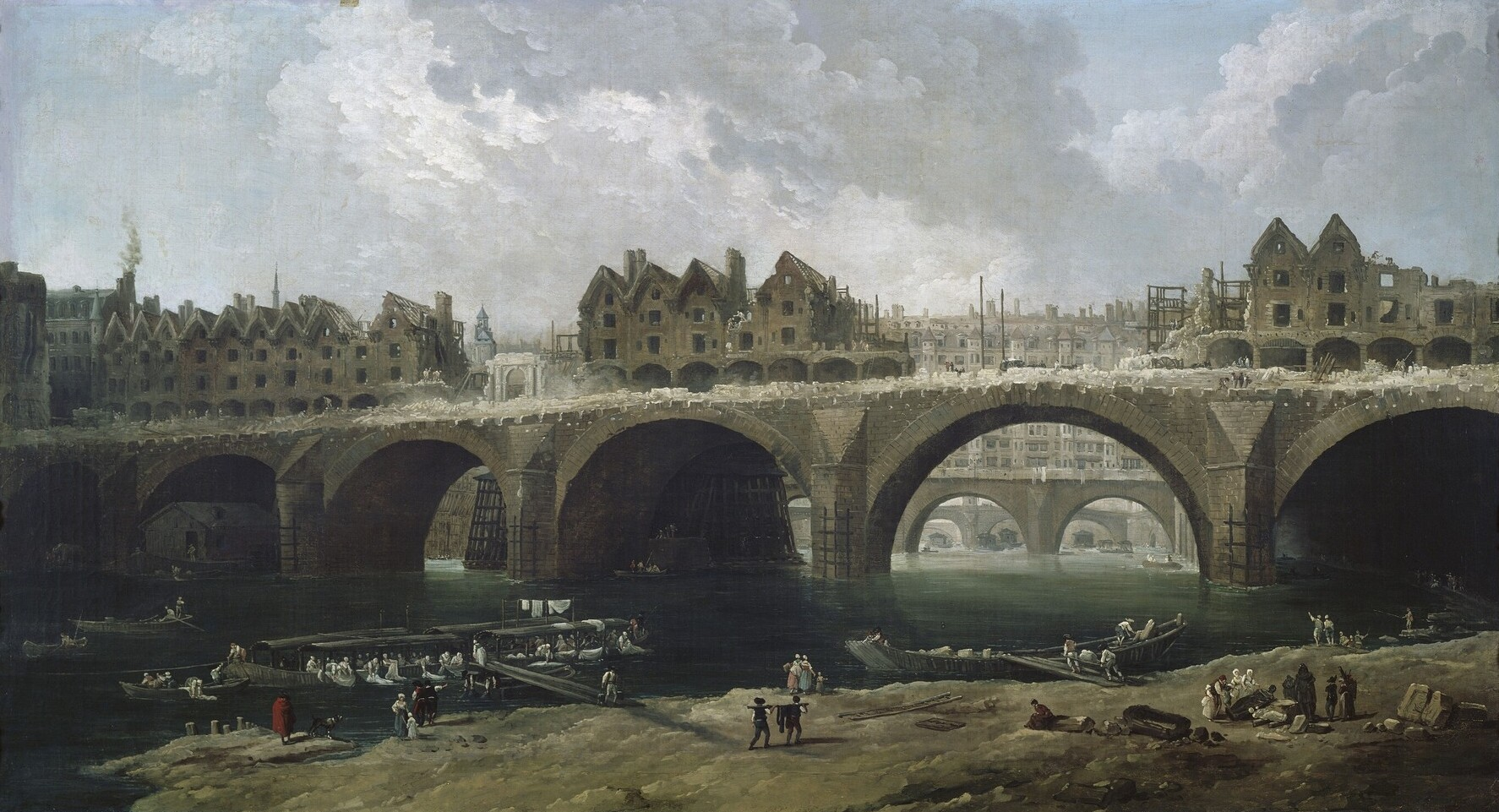
Demolition of houses on the Pont Notre-Dame, by Hubert Robert (1786)

Paris in the first half of the 18th century had some beautiful buildings, but it was not a beautiful city. The philosopher Jean-Jacques Rousseau described his disappointment when he first arrived in Paris in 1731: I expected a city as beautiful as it was grand, of an imposing appearance, where you saw only superb streets, and palaces of marble and gold. Instead, when I entered by the Faubourg Saint-Marceau, I saw only narrow, dirty and foul-smelling streets, and villainous black houses, with an air of unhealthiness; beggars, poverty; wagons-drivers, menders of old garments; and vendors of tea and old hats."

In 1749, in Embellissements de Paris, Voltaire wrote: "We blush with shame to see the public markets, set up in narrow streets, displaying their filth, spreading infection, and causing continual disorders… Immense neighborhoods need public places. The center of the city is dark, cramped, hideous, something from the time of the most shameful barbarism."

In the second half of the century, in keeping with the ideas of the Enlightenment, the administration of Paris, particularly the police, made an effort to improve the way that the city looked and functioned. One example was the sidewalk; in mid-century sidewalks existed in London, but there were none in Paris. The first sidewalk in Paris was begun in 1781, along the new rue du Théâtre Française, now rue de l'Odéon, to protect the spectators going along the street to the new theater. The second sidewalk was begun in 1788 along rue Louvois, where another new theater was planned. The sidewalk was four feet wide (1.2 meters) and 10 to 12 inches (thirty centimeters) high, with a stone border. Before the end of the century, several more sidewalks were installed along new streets in the wealthy neighborhoods around the quarter of la Chaussée d'Antin.

An effort had begun in the 17th century to regulate the height of Paris buildings, which had grown higher and higher, blocking all light to the narrow streets. An ordinance of 18 August 1667 limited the height of buildings to 15.6 meters, the first such limit in the city. Royal declarations in 1783 and 1784 set a limit on the height of buildings determined by the width of the street; For a street at least ten meters wide, the buildings along the street could not be more than twenty meters, or six stories, including the attic. For the narrower streets, less than 7.45 meters wide, the height of buildings was limited to 11.7 meters. The result was to give a uniform appearance and height to the new Paris streets.

The city authorities, led by the Lieutenant General of Police, made the first serious efforts to improve traffic circulation in the congested streets of the city, by removing stones and barriers put in front of houses and by restricting the placement of the tables and carts of street merchants. They also tried to improve the bottleneck of traffic created on the ten existing bridges over the Seine. The houses which lined the Pont au Change were pulled down, and a project was launched in 1725 to build a new bridge to connect two of the city's most wealthy new neighborhoods, the Faubourg de rue Saint-Honoré on the right bank and the Faubourg Saint-Germain on the right bank. Construction on the new bridge did not begin until 1788; stones from the demolished Bastille were used to help finish the bridge, which was dedicated in 1791 as the Pont Louis XVI. It was renamed the pont de la Revolution in 1792; then, in 1795, Pont de la Concorde.

An attempt was also made in the late 18th century to improve the quality of street lighting. In 1669, under Louis XIV, the city was already lit with three thousand oil lamps, suspended in the middle of the street at a height of twenty feet, with twenty feet between each lantern, but not every street was lit, and the light was usually very dim; those going out at night or to the theater were usually obliged to hire a lantern-bearer to light their way until the end of the century. Between 1745 and 1769, the old lanterns were gradually replaced by a new model called a réverbère which, mounted on a lamp post, gave off a much brighter light. By 1789, there were 5,694 new lanterns in service. A few years later the most popular revolutionary song, Ça ira! urged Parisians to hang aristocrats from the new lanterns.

The predominant architectural style in Paris from the mid-17th century until the regime of Louis Philippe I was neo-classicism, based on the model of Greco-Roman architecture; the most classical example was the new church of La Madeleine, whose construction began in 1764. It was so widely used that it invited criticism: just before the Revolution the journalist Louis-Sébastien Mercier wrote: "How monotonous is the genius of our architects! How they live on copies, on eternal repetition! They don't know how to make the smallest building without columns… They all more or less resemble temples."

== Revolutionary Paris (1789–1799) ==
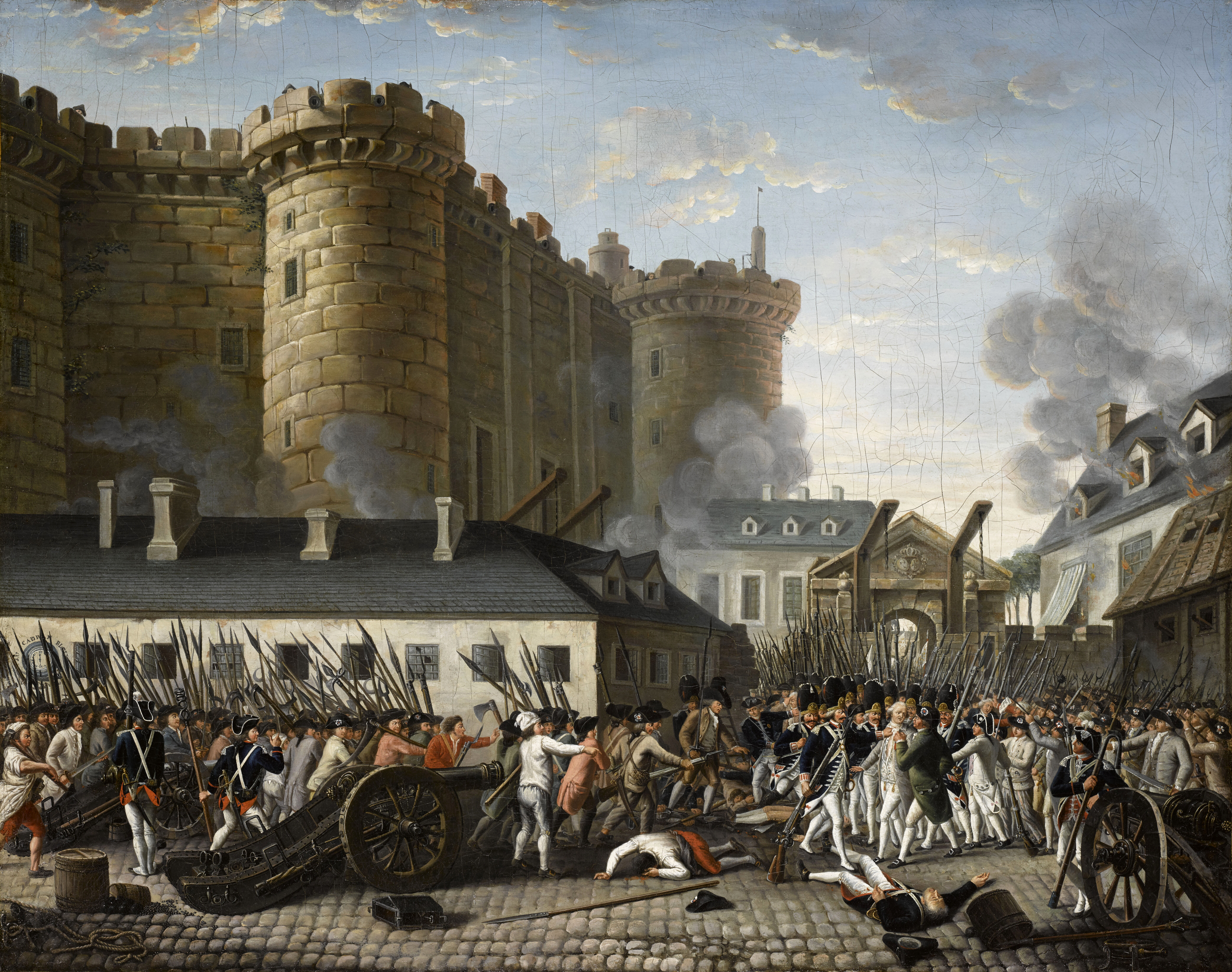
The storming of the Bastille on 14 July 1789 during the French Revolution, (Musée de la Révolution française).

=== The eve of the Revolution ===
Louis XVI had ascended the throne of France in 1774, and his new government in Versailles desperately needed money; the treasury had been drained by the Seven Years' War (1755–63) and the French intervention in the American Revolution. To establish better relations with Paris, in 1774 the King restored the historic Parlement of Paris, France's oldest and highest court of nobles. To save money, he abolished the two companies of musketeers of the Paris garrison, and reduced the number of Gardes Françaises in Paris from six to four battalions, and dismissed or demoted many of commanders. This significantly reduced the number of loyal soldiers and police available in Paris to defend the government. Between 1784 and 1791, the frivolity of the Court and extravagant expenditures of Marie-Antoinette ruined the public sympathy she had initially enjoyed. Dozens of clandestine pamphlets began to circulate in Paris, condemning the immorality of the Queen and nobility.

The royal administration also quickly ruined its reputation with the Parisians. They decided to build a new wall around Paris, not to keep invaders out, but to stop the smuggling of goods into Paris past the tax collectors, merchandise coming into the city. The wall, called the Wall of the Farmers-General, was twenty-five kilometers long, four to five meters high, and had fifty-six gates where taxes had to be paid. Portions of the wall can still be seen at Place Denfert-Rochereau and Place de la Nation, and one of the toll gates in the Parc Monceau. The wall and the taxes were highly unpopular, and, along with shortages of bread, fueled the growing discontent.

The King's finance minister, Turgot, tried to reform the finances of the state, reducing state expenses and freeing the prices of grain from state control. Speculation on grain prices drove the price of bread up, leading to bread riots in Paris on 3 May 1775. After supporting Turgot, in 1776 the King dismissed him and refused to make any further major fiscal reforms. The King also lost much of his support within the army. In 1781, the minister of the Army, Ségur, decided that any candidate to be an army officer had to show four degrees of nobility, blocking any path of advancement for talented but non-noble officers. Even noble officers had to be rich enough to pay a large sum for their promotion. When the Revolution came, the non-noble and less-wealthy officers abandoned the King and joined the Revolutionaries. By August 1788, the government had run out of money, and gave soldiers and government workers and contractors notes promising to pay, rather than cash. Riots broke out, and customs posts all over Paris were attacked and burned. The King gave way and appointed the Swiss-born banker and reformist, Jacques Necker, as his new finance minister.

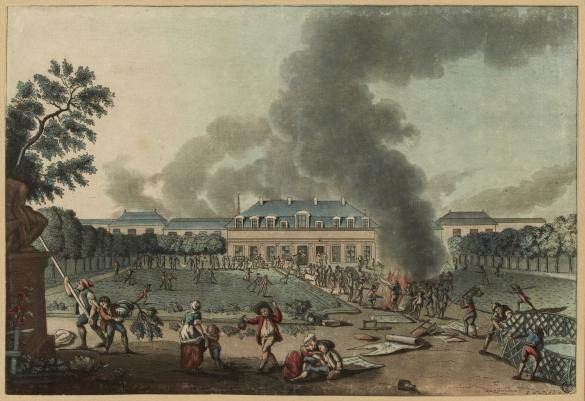
Rioters attack the house of the first prominent Paris industrialist, Jean-Baptiste Réveillon, on 28 April 1789

The economic crisis within Paris continued to worsen. A French trade agreement signed with Britain in 1786 allowed British manufactured goods to be sold in France at low tariffs; as a result, many Parisian workers, particularly those in the fledgling French textile industry, lost their jobs. Riots broke out in April, as unemployed workers wrecked one textile factory, attacked the home of Jean-Baptiste Réveillon, the city's most prominent textile factory owner, and attacked police barricades. Twenty-five rioters and twelve members of the Gardes-Françaises were killed'. The ordinary soldiers of the Gardes, discontented with their role, began to disobey their officers. The weather also contributed to the distress of the city; the winter of 1788–1789 was exceptionally cold, with an unprecedented ninety-six days of freezing temperatures, reaching to between twenty and thirty degrees below zero Celsius. The price of a four-pound loaf of bread, the standard staple of Parisians, which was 9 sous on 17 August 1788, rose to 14 sous 6 deniers on 1 February 1789.

The King, desperate for funds, decided to summon the Estates-General, an assembly of representatives of the nobility, clergy and the "Third Estate", the wealthy bourgeois and professional class, to raise funds for his government. On May 12, a week after the assembly had begun, Paris elected its Third Estate representatives, led by the prominent astronomer Jean Sylvain Bailly. When the meeting began at Versailles he was elected leader of all of the Third Estate deputies. The meeting took place in the tennis court of the Palace of Versailles. On June 23, the King, displeased by the opposition of Bailly and the Third Estate deputies, tried to have them expelled from the meeting. Bailly refused to leave, declaring that "A nation assembled cannot receive orders." A large part of the clergy and forty-seven nobles, led by the Duke of Orleans, took the side of Bailly. On June 24 he King was forced to yield and welcomed the new assembly, but soon afterwards, pressured by his court, he tried to regain control and ordered twenty army regiments to march to Paris. July 11, he defied the Estates-General by dismissing his reformist finance minister, Jacques Necker.

As news of the dismissal of Necker spread, Paris became extremely agitated. An English visitor named Young described the atmosphere in one Paris café:

"Not only was the inside of the cafe was full, but there was a crowd of listeners at the doors and windows, listening to the speakers, who, standing on chairs and tables, each had his own small audience. One cannot imagine the thunderous applause that greeted each expression of defiance and violence against the government. I am astonished that the ministry could permit such nests and hotbeds of sedition and revolt."

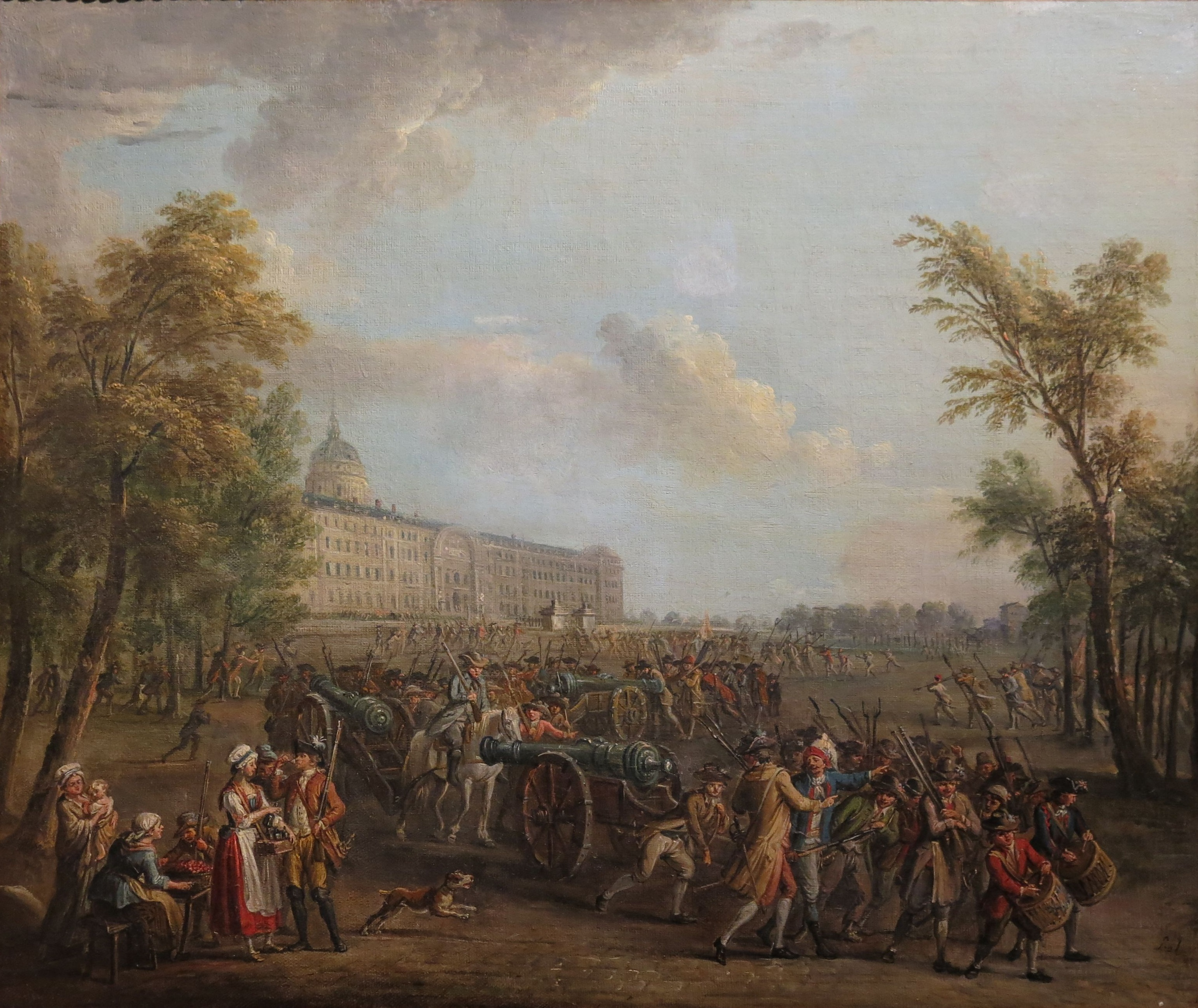
Looting the weapons to the Invalides on the morning of July 14, 1789 (Jean-Baptiste Lallemand)

The tensions quickly turned to violence. On 11 July 1789, soldiers of the Royal-Allemand regiment attacked a peaceful demonstration of Parisians protesting the dismissal of Necker on Place Louis XV (now Place de la Concorde). On 13 July, a mob of Parisians occupied the Hôtel de Ville, and the Marquis de Lafayette organized a Garde nationale to defend the city against the army. On 14 July, a mob seized the arsenal at the Invalides, acquiring thousands of guns, and stormed the Bastille, a symbol of royal authority, a prison which at the time held only seven prisoners, and was defended by eighty invalid soldiers, reinforced by thirty-six Swiss guards. About forty Revolutionaries were killed in the fighting. The governor of the Bastille, the Marquis de Launay, surrendered and then was killed, and his head put on the end of a pike and carried around Paris. The Provost of the Merchants (mayor) of Paris, Jacques des Fleselles, was also murdered, and his head paraded around the city. The fortress itself was completely demolished by November, and the stones turned into souvenirs.

The King was forced to yield. On the 15th, he withdrew his troops from the city, and on the 16th he recalled Necker to the ministry. The first independent Paris Commune, or city council, met in the Hôtel de Ville and on 15 July, and chose a new mayor, the astronomer Jean Sylvain Bailly. The King himself came to Paris on 17 July, where he was welcomed by the new mayor and wore the tricolor on his hat; red and blue, the colors of Paris, and white, the royal color.

Bread prices remained extremely high, at thirteen and a half sous for a four-pound loaf, as speculators and merchants held back grain to obtain higher prices or to assure reserves for an uncertain future. On 4 October Inflammatory new newspapers appeared, including the Ami de Peuple of Marat and the Chronique de Paris, blaming the aristocracy for plotting to starve Paris. On 5 October 1789, a large crowd of Parisians marched to Versailles and, the following day, brought the royal family and government back to Paris, as virtual prisoners. The new government of France, the National Assembly, began to meet in the Salle du Manège of the Tuileries Palace.

With both the King and Assembly in Paris, the city became calmer, and bread prices came down. On 21 May 1790, the Charter of the city of Paris was adopted, declaring the city independent of royal authority. The city was divided into twelve municipalities (later known as arrondissements), and into forty-eight sections. It was governed by a mayor, sixteen administrators and thirty-two city council members. Bailly was formally elected mayor by the Parisians on 2 August 1790. A huge celebration, the Fête de la Fédération, was held on the Champ de Mars on 14 July 1790 to celebrate the first anniversary of the Revolution. Before a cheering crowd of 300,000 persons, the units of the National Guard, led by the Lafayette, took an oath to defend "The Nation, the Law and the King", and swore to uphold the Constitution approved by the king.

Nonetheless, tensions remained below the surface; following the seizure of the Bastille, the wealthiest Parisians began to take their belongings and go abroad for their own safety. This had a disastrous effect on the Paris economy, putting out of work dressmakers and tailors, furniture makers, cooks, maids and servants and shopkeepers in the luxury goods business.

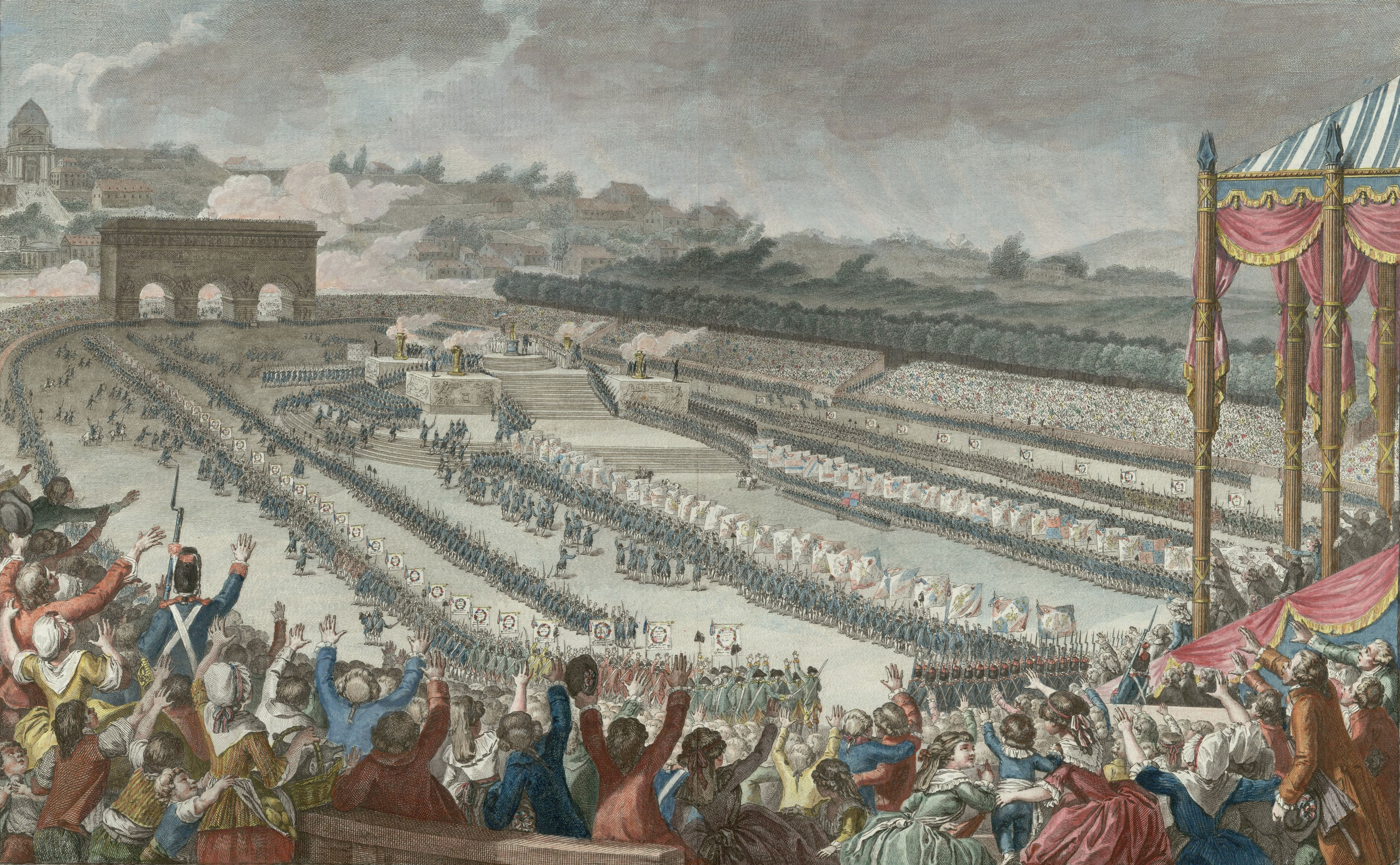
The Fête de la Federation on the Champ de Mars celebrated the first anniversary of the Revolution (July 14, 1790)

Revolutionary activity in Paris was centered around the new political clubs which quickly appeared. The radical Jacobins had their headquarters in the former convent of the Dominicans on Rue Saint-Honoré, near the meeting place of the National Assembly in the manege of the Tuileries Palace, and the home of its most famous member, Robespierre. The Club des Feuillants was also headquartered in a former convent, next to the Tuileries; its members supported the Revolution, but wanted to go no further than a constitutional monarchy; its members included Mayor Bailly, the Marquis de Lafayette, Mirabeau and Talleyrand. The supporters of the King and absolute monarchy had their own meeting place, the Club des Impartiaux, in the former convent of the Grands-Augustins, also close to the Tuileries. A former convent of the Franciscans on the left bank, between rue Racine and rue de l'École-de-Medicine, was the home of the club of Cordeliers, founded in April 1790. It included some of the most fervent revolutionaries, including Jean-Paul Marat, Georges Danton, Camille Desmoulins. The left bank was also the home of the printers who produced newspapers and pamphlets which shaped public opinion. Some five hundred new newspapers of all political views appeared in Paris between 1789 and 1792.

In 1791, tensions rose again as the Assembly decided to pay the debts of the State by nationalizing the property of the church, and requiring priests to take an oath of loyalty to the government. On 18 April 1791, the King was prevented by angry crowd from taking his family from the Tuileries Palace to the château of Saint-Cloud, despite the intervention of Mayor Bailly and La Fayette. Louis XVI and his family decided it was time to escape, and fled Paris on 21 June 1791, but were captured in Varennes and brought back to Paris on 25 June.

Hostility grew within Paris between the liberal aristocrats and merchants, who wanted a constitutional monarchy, and the more radical 'sans-culottes from the working-class and poor neighborhoods, who wanted a republic and the abolition of the old regime, including the aristocracy and the Church. On 17 July 1791, the National Guard fired upon a gathering of sans-culottes on the Champs de Mars, killing dozens. A red flag, the symbol of martial law, was hoisted over the Hotel de Ville, some radical leaders were arrested, the club of the Cordeliers was closed, but the most radical leaders, including Danton, Marat and Desmoulins and Santerre escaped. Bailly and Lafayette lost what remained of their popularity, and open war broke out between the more moderate and more radical revolutionaries.

=== The fall of the monarchy ===
Beginning 21 January 1792, the sans-culottes and their leaders from the radical clubs took over the major food depots of the Faubourgs Saint-Antoine, Saint-Denis and Saint-Martin, seizing grain and food products and selling them at prices that they thought were fair. The police and national guard did not interfere, but simply maintained order at the markets. Thanks to the slave revolt and anarchy on the French island of Saint-Dominique, sugar supplies to the city stopped, increasing discontent in all the cafes of Paris.

The King, a prisoner in the Tuileries Palace, hoped for a military intervention by Austria and Prussia to restore his power. The Radicals and Jacobins newly elected to the National Assembly also sought war, believing it would expose traitors and unite the French against the monarch and their enemies. The French Army had lost most of its officers, who were members of the nobility; six thousand of the nine thousand officers had emigrated. Parisians read in their newspapers that armies of emigres hostile to the Revolution were gathering on the northern and eastern frontiers of France, and were told by the more radical newspapers that aristocrats and their supporters in Paris were secretly preparing to seize power. On 20 April 1792, the Assembly voted for war against the Habsburg Empire. The French army, without officers and with its men in rebellion, lost all discipline. Théobald Dillon, an Irish-born French general and aristocrat, was accused by his soldiers of favoring the Austrians and killed.

The Jacobins, Cordeliers and their allies were increasingly in control of the legislature meeting in the Tuileries. On 7 May 1792, the assembly authorized the deportation of any priest who refused to take an oath to the government, or was denounced by a citizen. On 29 May, they dissolved the regiment that guarded the King. On 20 June sans-culottes invaded the Tuileries Palace, where they forced the King to put on a red liberty cap and to drink a toast to the nation. General Lafayette disgusted by the actions of the sans-culottes, quit the National Guard and offered to organize a military coup to save the King, but Marie Antoinette refused to allow it, saying, "better to perish than to be saved by Lafayette."

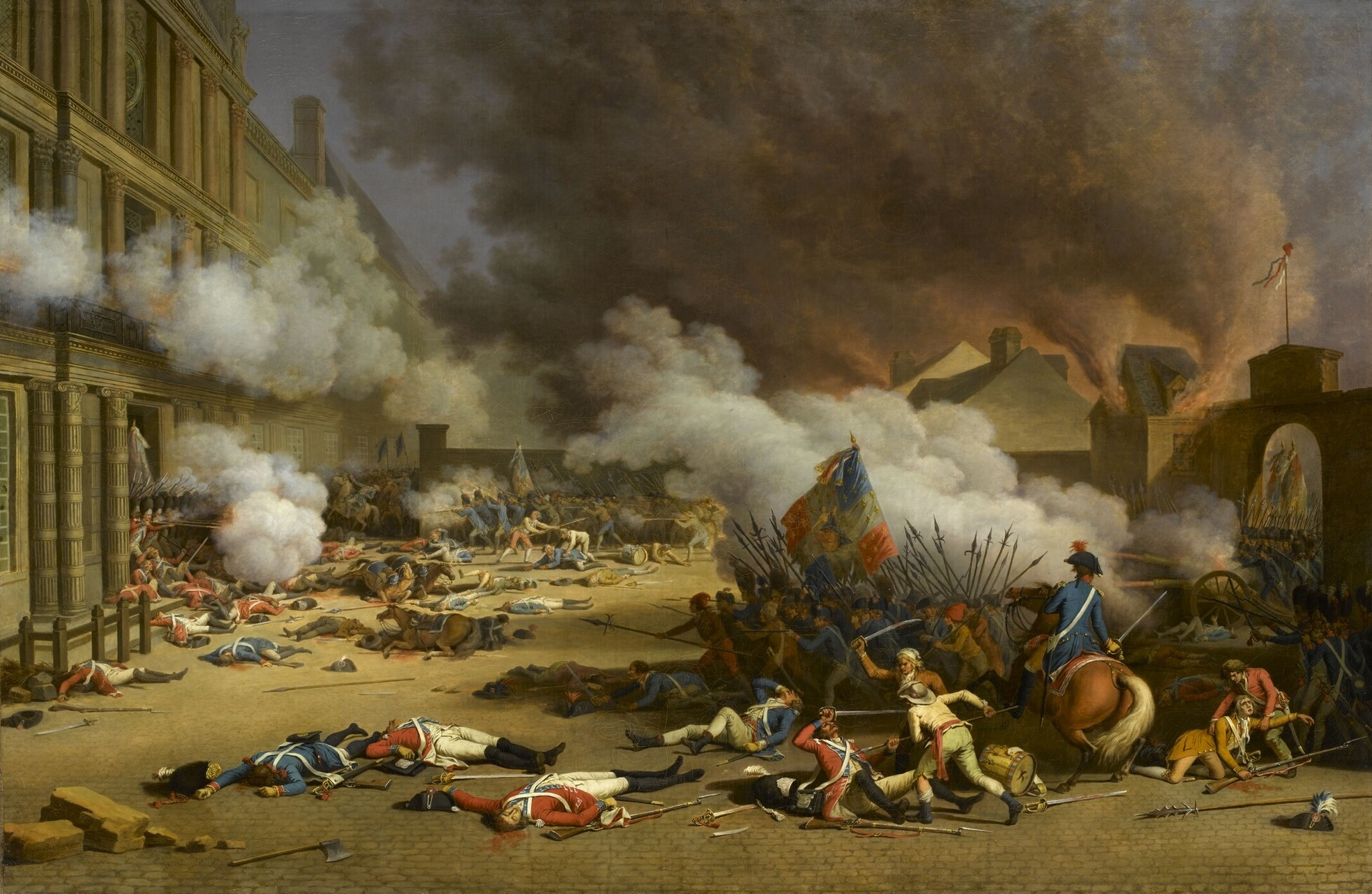
The storming of the Tuileries Palace and massacre of the Swiss guards, 10 August 1792

The Austrian and Prussian armies began to assemble on the northern and eastern frontiers of France, and the legislature issued a warning that the nation was in danger. On 29 July, at the Jacobins Club, Robespierre demanded suspension of the monarchy, and the election of a National Convention to write a new constitution. On 1 August, news reached Paris that the Duke of Brunswick, commander of the army of the King of Prussia, threatened to destroy Paris unless the Parisians accepted the authority of their king. Shortly before midnight on 9 August, Danton rang the church bell of the Cordelier Club, signaling an insurrection. The sans-culottes took over the Hôtel-de-Ville, deposed the Paris City government, put the second mayor of Paris, Jérôme Pétion de Villeneuve, under house arrest, and established their own government, the insurrectional Commune. At six in the morning on the 10th, armed sans-culottes from the more radical sections of the city, joined by volunteers for the new revolutionary army who had just arrived from Brest and Marseille, attacked the Tuileries Palace. The Palace was defended by two thousand national guardsmen, whose loyalty to the King was uncertain; a company of two hundred volunteer nobles, and nine hundred Swiss guards. Early in the morning the commander of the National Guard at the Palace was invited to an urgent meeting, where he was surprised and murdered. The King and his family were persuaded to leave at the Palace, to take refuge with the National Assembly in the riding academy a short distance away. He had just left the Palace when volunteers from Brest and Marseille forced the gates and the Swiss Guards opened fire. A bloody battle followed, even after the King sent a message ordering the Swiss guards to cease fire. Most of the noble volunteers and remaining National Guardsmen escaped, but two thirds of the Swiss guards, recognizable in their red uniforms, were massacred.

On 11 August, the insurrectional Commune declared that France would be governed by a National Convention, which would write a new Constitution. On 13 August, Louis XVI and his family were imprisoned in the Temple fortress. The Commune was composed of two hundred eighty-eight members, mostly from the Cordeliers and Jacobin clubs and mostly from the middle class and liberal professions, including the lawyer Robespierre and Danton, the new minister of justice. As news arrived that the Austrians and Prussians had invaded France and were advancing toward Paris, the Commune imposed harsher and harsher measures, including the arrest of children and wives of those who had emigrated. From 2 to 6 September 1792, bands of sans-culottes broke into the prisons and murdered between a third and half of the three thousand prisoners they found there including priests who had refused to take an oath supporting the government, the surviving Swiss guards, and a large number of common criminals.

Voting for members of the Convention took place in early September, under the intimidating eye of the sans-culottes, who filled the Paris voting places. Twenty-four members were elected from Paris, including Robespierre, Danton, Marat, Camille Desmoulins, and the painter David. On 20 September, the hastily assembled revolutionary army won an indecisive victory at Valmy, causing the Prussians to withdraw, and saving Paris from attacks by the royalists. On 21 September, at its first meeting, the Convention abolished the monarchy, and the next day declared France to be a republic. The Convention moved its meeting place to a large hall within the Tuileries Palace. The Committee of Public Safety, charged with hunting down the enemies of the Revolution, established its headquarters close by in the Pavillon de Flore of the Louvre, while the Tribunal, the revolutionary court, set up its courtroom within the old Royal Palace on the Île-de-la-Cité, inside what is now the Palais de Justice.

The Commune, the government of Paris, also held elections, but these were won by the more moderate members, known as the Girondins, rather than the more radical faction, the Montagnards, largely because the election, unlike the Convention vote, was by secret ballot. The minority Montagnards retaliated by calling a meeting of the Commune without notifying the Girondins, redrafted the election rules in their favor, and in February 1793 eliminated the Girondins and elected a city government dominated by the Montagnards and the sans-culottes.

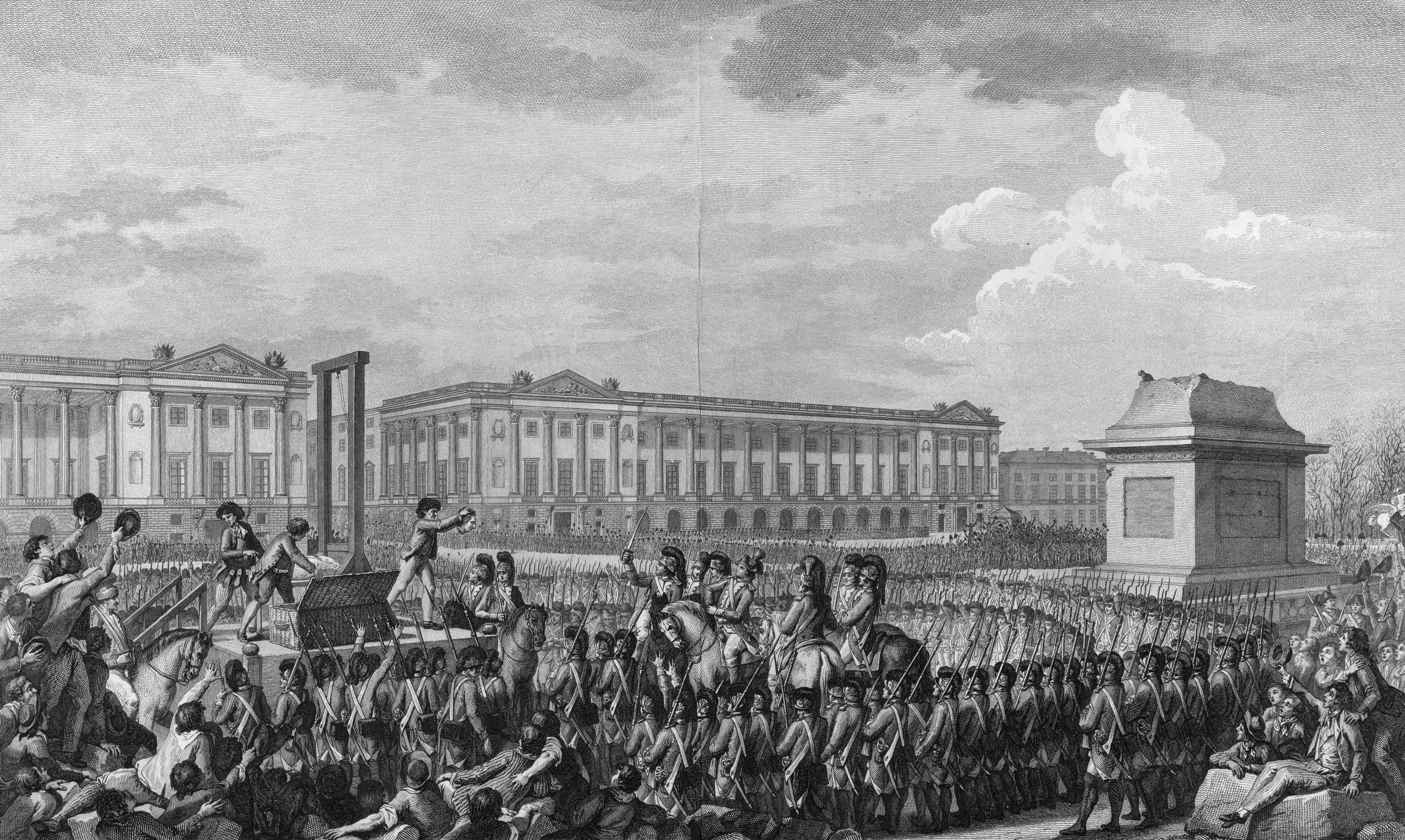
The execution of King Louis XVI on the Place de la Revolution. Drums were played loudly so his final words to the crowd could not be heard.

=== The Convention and the Reign of Terror ===
The Convention put the King on trial, and after two months, voted by a majority of a single vote, for his execution. On 21 January 1793, Louis XVI was guillotined on the Place de la Révolution (former Place Louis XV, now Place de la Concorde. Following the King's execution, rebellions against the government broke out in many regions of the country, particularly Brittany and Angevin. The Minister of Defense of the Commune, Dumouriez, tried without success to persuade his soldiers to march on Paris to overthrow the new government, and ended up defecting to the Austrians. To deal with these new threats, real or imagined, on 6 April 1793 the Convention established a Committee of Public Safety, to hunt for enemies and watch over the actions of the government. New decrees were issued for the arrest of families of émigrés, aristocrats and refractory priests, and the immunity from arrest of members of the Convention was taken away. On 10 March the Convention created a revolutionary Tribunal, located in the Palace of Justice. Verdicts of the Tribunal could not be appealed, and sentences were to be carried out immediately. Marie Antoinette was beheaded on 16 October 1793, and Jean Sylvain Bailly, the first elected mayor of Paris, was executed on 12 November 1793. The property of the aristocracy and of the Church was confiscated and declared Biens nationaux (national property); the churches were closed.

The government struggled to maintain the food supply to the city, particularly the supply of bread. Bakers were allowed to make only one kind of bread, known as pain de l'égalité, or "equality bread". Fortunately for the government there was a good harvest and grain was abundant. Firewood and charcoal, needed for cooking and heating, however, were in very short supply, and crowds of sans-culottes frequently invaded the depots.

The Convention moved to eliminate all vestiges of religion, the aristocracy, and the old regime. The French Republican Calendar, a new non-Christian calendar, was created, with the year 1793 becoming "Year One": 27 July 1794 was "9 Thermidor of the year II". Many street names were changed, and the revolutionary slogan, "Liberty, Equality, Fraternity", was engraved on the façades of government buildings. New forms of address were required: Monsieur and Madame were replaced by Citoyen and Citoyenne, and the formal vous was replaced by the more proletarian tu. Stores were forbidden to close on Sunday, and the heads of the statues of Saints on the façade of Notre-Dame cathedral were decapitated. Streets named for saints had the word "saint" effaced with a hammer. On 10 November, the first festival of Reason and Liberty was celebrated at the Cathedral.

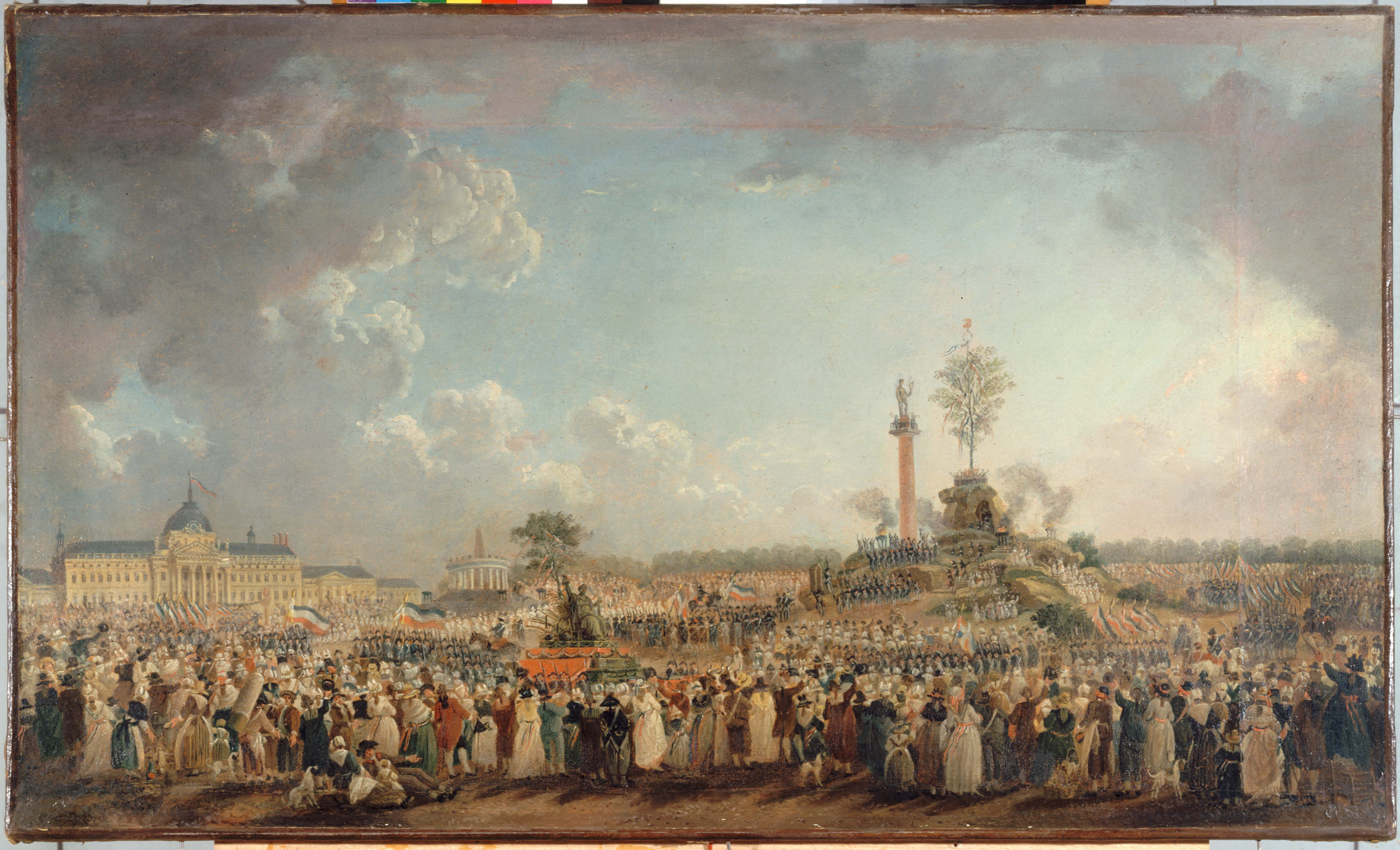
The Festival of the Supreme Being, held on 8 June 1794 on the Champs de Mars, was an official celebration of Cult of reason presided over by Robespierre. On July 27 he was arrested and sent to the guillotine, ending the Reign of Terror.

On December 4, 1793, the relative independence of the city government of Paris that it had enjoyed since 1789 was ended; the districts of the city, corresponding roughly to the present arrondissements, were placed under the control of the Committee of Public Safety and the Committee, with "National Agents" placed in each district to assure that they observed the decrees of the national government. A struggle for power broke out within the Convention between the supporters of Robespierre and those of Georges Danton, leading to the arrest of Danton and his supporters on 30 March, his judgment by the Revolutionary Tribunal, and his execution on 5 April 1794. On 10 June a new decree deprived those brought before Revolutionary Tribunal of any legal rights. Between 6 April 1793 and 10 June 1794, the Revolutionary Tribune had pronounced 1,250 death sentences in ninety days; between 11 June and 27 July 1794, it issued 1,376 death sentences in just 47 days. Those condemned were sent from the Palais de Justice to the execution site in convoys of carts. The guillotine was moved to the edge of the city, at the Barrière du Trône, farther from the public eye, and the pace of executions accelerated to as many as fifty a day; the cadavers were buried in common graves on rue de Picpus. Among those executed in the last great surge of the reign of terror were the eminent chemist Lavoisier (8 May 1794) and the poet Andre Chenier, executed 25 July 1794, just two days before the end of the Terror.

On June 8, 1794, at the debut of the new wave of terror, Robespierre presided over the Festival of the Supreme Being in the huge amphitheater on the Champs de Mars which had been constructed in 1790 for the first anniversary of the Revolution; the ceremony was designed by the painter David, and featured a ten-hour parade, bonfires a statue of wisdom, and a gigantic mountain with a tree of liberty at the peak. The pretensions of Robespierre annoyed many of those present, and there were cries of "dictator!" and "tyrant!" from some in the crowd. The growing number of enemies of Robespierre within the Convention began to quietly plot against him. On 26 July, Robespierre, sensing what was happening, gave a long speech at the Commune, denouncing "a conspiracy against the public liberties", calling for a purge of the Convention and the arrest of his enemies. Instead of supporting him, the more moderate members of the Commune rose and spoke against him. The following day he was prevented from speaking to the Commune. The next day bells were rung calling the sans-culottes to arms to defend Robespierre, but few responded. Early in the morning of 28 July, policemen and members of the National Guard summoned by the Convention invaded the Hôtel de Ville and arrested Robespierre and his twenty-one remaining supporters. They were guillotined at seven in the evening the same day, before a large and approving crowd.

== Paris under the Directory (1795–1799) ==
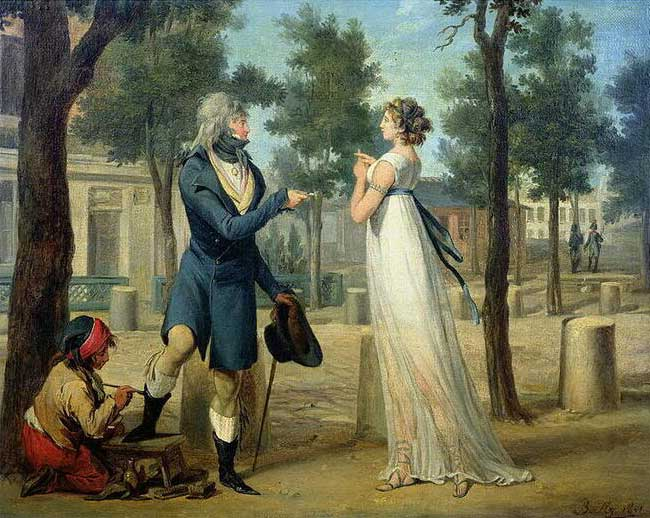
Parisians during the Directory, by Louis-Léopold Boilly. A decrotteur scrapes mud from the man's boots

Following the execution of Robespierre, the executions stopped and the prisons gradually emptied, but the city remained agitated and barely functional. The former city government, the Commune, had virtually disappeared; of the one hundred forty members of its General Council before the Terror, eighty-seven had been guillotined, and forty imprisoned. Of the thirty-three senior city administrators, twenty had been executed and ten imprisoned. It was impossible to have a document registered for lack of living city employees. On August 24, 1794, the new government of France, the Directory created a whole new city government. The forty-eight sections, each governed by a revolutionary committee, were replaced by twelve arrondissements, strictly under the control of the Directory. Each arrondissement was governed by a committee of seven persons, named by the Directory. The police were under the command of a commission named by the national government. On 11 October 1795, the position of Mayor of Paris was abolished, and replaced by a committee of five administrators of the Department of the Seine, with it offices on Place Vendôme. The most important person in the new city structure was the Commissaire named by the Directory to supervise the administration of the city, a post which eventually became known as the Prefect of the Seine.

The life of ordinary Parisians was extremely difficult, due to a very cold winter in 1794–95, there were shortages and long lines for bread, firewood, charcoal meat, sugar, coffee, vegetables and wine. The money dropped sharply in value; an assignat, or banknote originally issued for one hundred livres, was worth thirty-four livres at the time of death of Robespierre, and sixteen in March 1795, and 4 in June 1795. Two thousand six hundred Parisians were reported as dying from hunger in January 1795, and two thousand more during the spring.

The shortages led to unrest; on 1 April 1795 a crowd of Parisians, including many women and children, invaded the meeting hall of the Convention, demanding bread and the return of the old revolutionary government. They were removed from the hall by the army and the national guard. The city was placed under a state of siege and four members of the previous administration, blamed for the invasion, were promptly deported to Madagascar and Guyana. Another uprising took place on 20 May 1795, with another invasion of the meeting hall by sans-culottes; one deputy was killed and his head paraded around; a group of radical deputies, controlling the hall, voted for a return to the revolutionary government, and bells were rung in the Faubourg Saint-Antoine calling for a general uprising. The uprising went no further; the majority of Deputies returned to the hall and overturned the decision of the radicals, and soldiers surrounded the Faubourg Saint-Antoine and disarmed the sans culottes.

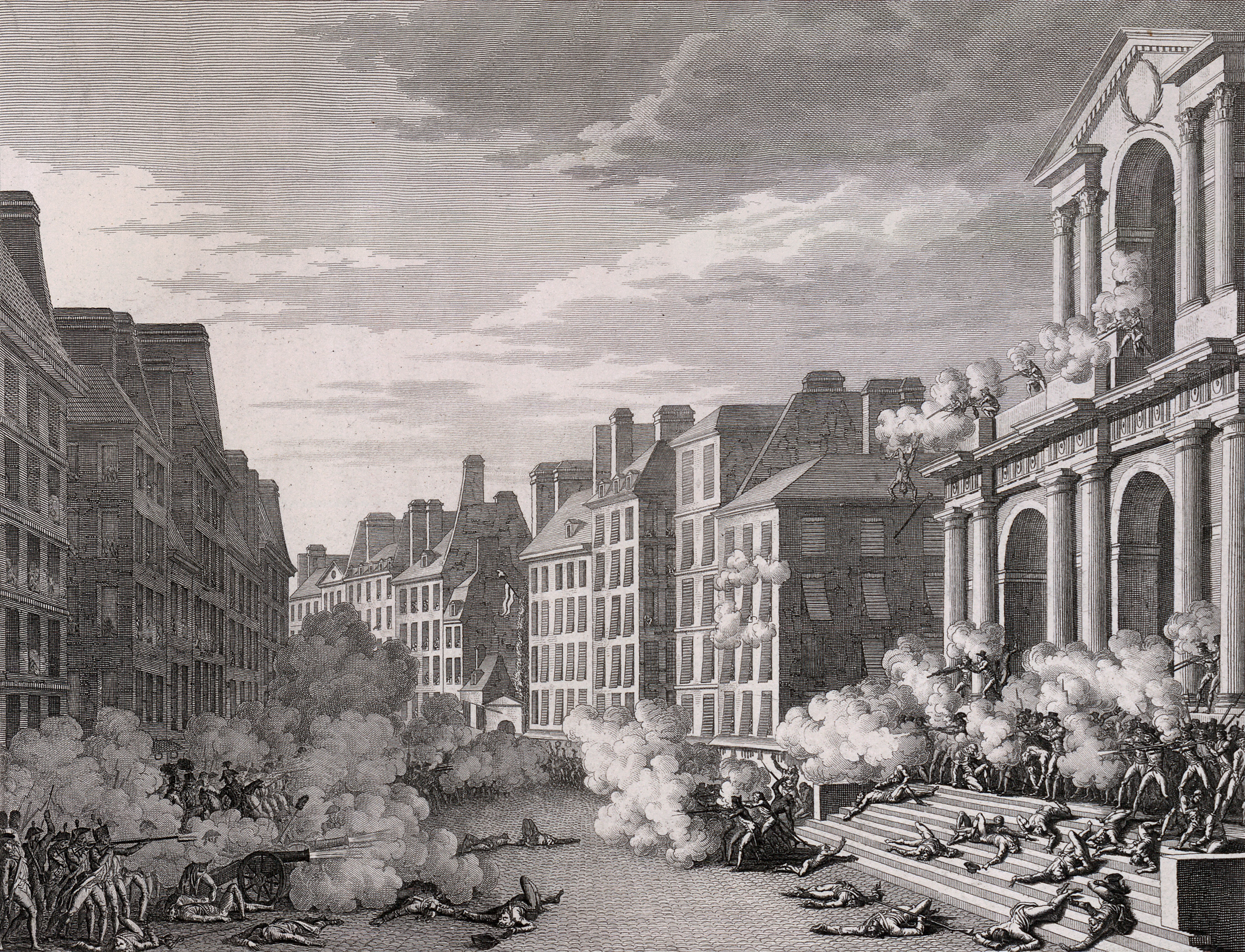
The cannons of Napoleon clear rue Saint-Honoré of royalist insurgents (October 5, 1795)

On 3 October 1795, a coalition of royalists and constitutional monarchists made their own attempt to replace the government, taking up arms and marching in two columns on the Tuileries Palace. The first column on Quai Voltaire was met by a young general of artillery, Napoleon Bonaparte, who had placed cannon on the opposite side of the river at the gates of the Louvre and the head of the Pont de la Concorde. The cannon fire broke up the first royalist column. The second column tried to advance on rue Saint-Honore, and briefly took up position at the theater of the Comédie-Française and then made a last stand on the steps of the Church of Saint-Roche, but were unable to resist the cannon fire. The rebellion was finished by six in the evening; about two hundred royalists were killed, and an equal number of supporters of the Convention; Napoleon's career as a commander and political figure was launched.

New elections were held in October 1795, and brought into power a government dominated by moderate republicans; the Paris contingent of elected officials included merchants, bankers, notaries, lawyers, as well as more radical revolutionaries and monarchists. Plots and uprisings succeeded one another; a conspiracy of monarchists attempted an uprising on 4 September 1797, but were quickly suppressed by the army. Radical Jacobins won the elections of April 1799, and allied themselves with their arch-enemies, the monarchists, to oppose the Directory. It appeared that the Revolution might begin again, when on 13 October 1799 Napoleon Bonaparte returned from his campaign in Egypt and organized a coup d'État that made him the First Consul.

=== Parisian society, marriage and divorce ===
During the Directory, almost all the structures and rules of Paris society had been swept away, but no new structures and rules had yet been created to replace them. The brothers Goncourt meticulously described the period on their Histoire de la société française pendant le Directoire. Caste and rank mattered far less; all the old titles and forms of address had disappeared, along with old customs and social conventions. Men no longer took off their hats when talking to women, and people of different ranks spoke to each other as equals. Society no longer met in private, in the houses of the nobility, but in public, at balls, restaurants and public gardens. As the Goncourts said, "social anarchy" reigned in Paris: "everyone met with everyone." Government ministers could be seen walking or dining with actresses, bankers with courtesans.

"Liaisons were easy", the Goncourts reported, "marriage less so." The old system of marriages arranged between families based on fortune, profession, and social condition was less common. Marriages were no longer controlled by the church, but by the new civil code, which described marriage as "nature in action." Marriage was seen as a temporary, not a permanent state. Children born outside of marriage were given equal status concerning inheritance and other legal matters as those born to married couples. Divorce was much simpler, and could be requested by either the husband or wife. In one period of fifteen months, 5,994 civil law divorces were granted in Paris, of which 3,886 were requested by the wife. of 1,148 divorces granted on the grounds of "incompatibility of humor", 887 were requested by the wife. The new system also led to a large increase in the number of children born outside of marriage and not wanted; in 1795 four thousand unwanted children in the Department of the Seine were turned over to founding hospitals.

The breakdown of the old system of arranged marriages led to the creation of the first newspaper where men and women could advertise themselves for suitable spouses, called the Indicateur des marriages. it also led to the establishment of the first marriage bureaus. A businessman named Liardot rented a large former mansion, brought in selected eligible young women as paying guests, and invited men seeking wives to meet them at balls, concerts and card games each given at the house each evening. The men were screened by their profession and education.

=== The Muscadins ===
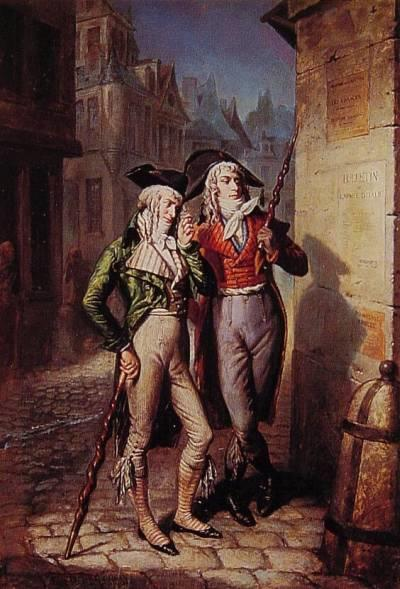
Muscadins by Loursay (1795)

Even before the end of Robespierre, a new royalist social movement, called the Muscadins had appeared. These were largely upper middle class young men, numbering between and two and three thousand, who dressed in an extravagant fashion, spoke with an exaggerated accent, carried canes as weapons, and, particularly in 1794 and 1795, they patrolled the streets in groups and attacked sans culottes and symbols of the revolution. They tried to be and act like the nobility of the Ancien Regime, and mostly tried to live in the abandoned Marais area. One of the most extreme of the revolutionaries, Marat, the editor of the radical newspaper L'Ami du people ("Friend of the people") had been assassinated on 13 July 1793, and on 22 September 1794, his ashes had been placed with great ceremony in the Pantheon, alongside those of Voltaire and Rousseau. After the downfall of Robespierre, the Convention issued a decree that no one should be entered in the Pantheon who had not been dead for ten years. The Muscadins went even further, invading the Pantheon, destroying Marat's monument and removing his ashes.

=== The Arts during the Directory – the Salon and the Louvre ===
The artists of Paris were in a difficult situation during the Directory; their most important patrons, the aristocracy, had been executed or sent into exile, and a new wealthy class was just being formed. Before the Revolution a half-figure portrait could be commissioned from a less-known artist for three hundred livres. During the Directory the price fell to forty-eight livres. Nonetheless, the Salon took place in the Louvre in 1795 as it had in the years before the Revolution, and each year thereafter. The most prominent artist of the revolutionary period, David, closely connected with the Jacobins, was in seclusion in his studio inside the Louvre, but a new generation of artists showed their works; François Gérard; Anne-Louis Girodet, a pupil of David, famous for his romantic paintings, particularly a 1797 painting of the prominent actress and courtesan Mademoiselle Lange as Venus; Carle Vernet, the son and father of famous painters; The portrait painter Jean-Baptiste Isabey, who painted all the rulers of France from Marie-Antoinette through Napoleon III; the genre painter Louis-Léopold Boilly; Antoine-Jean Gros, a young history and landscape painter, who soon achieved fame and a government position in 1796 with a heroic portrait of Napoleon at the battle of Arcole; the romantic landscapes of Hubert Robert; Pierre-Paul Prud'hon, whose work combined classicism and romanticism; and a major neoclassical sculptor from the earlier generation, the sculptor Jean-Antoine Houdon, famous for his busts of George Washington and Voltaire.

Art during the Directory

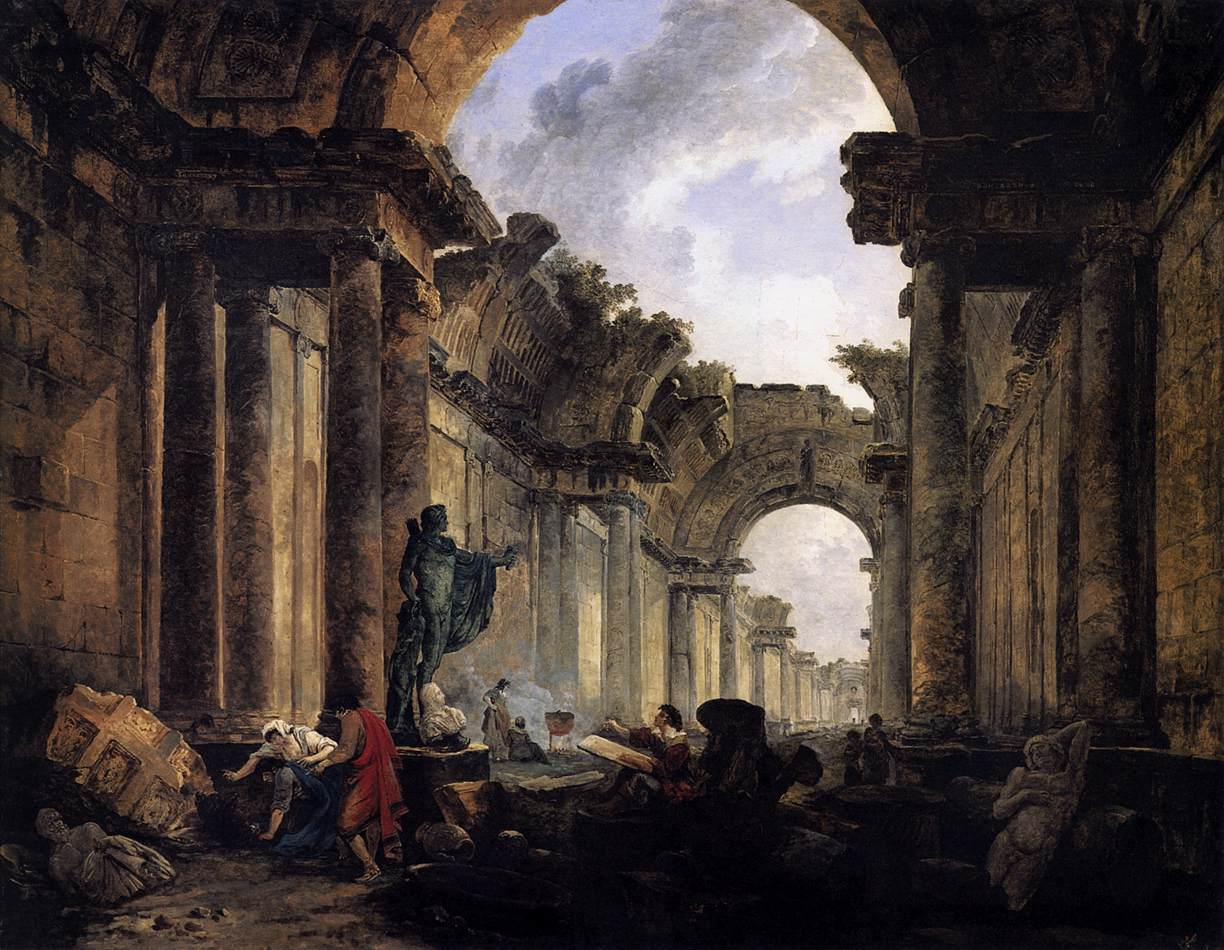
Imaginary view of the gallery of the Louvre as a ruin, by Hubert Robert (1796)

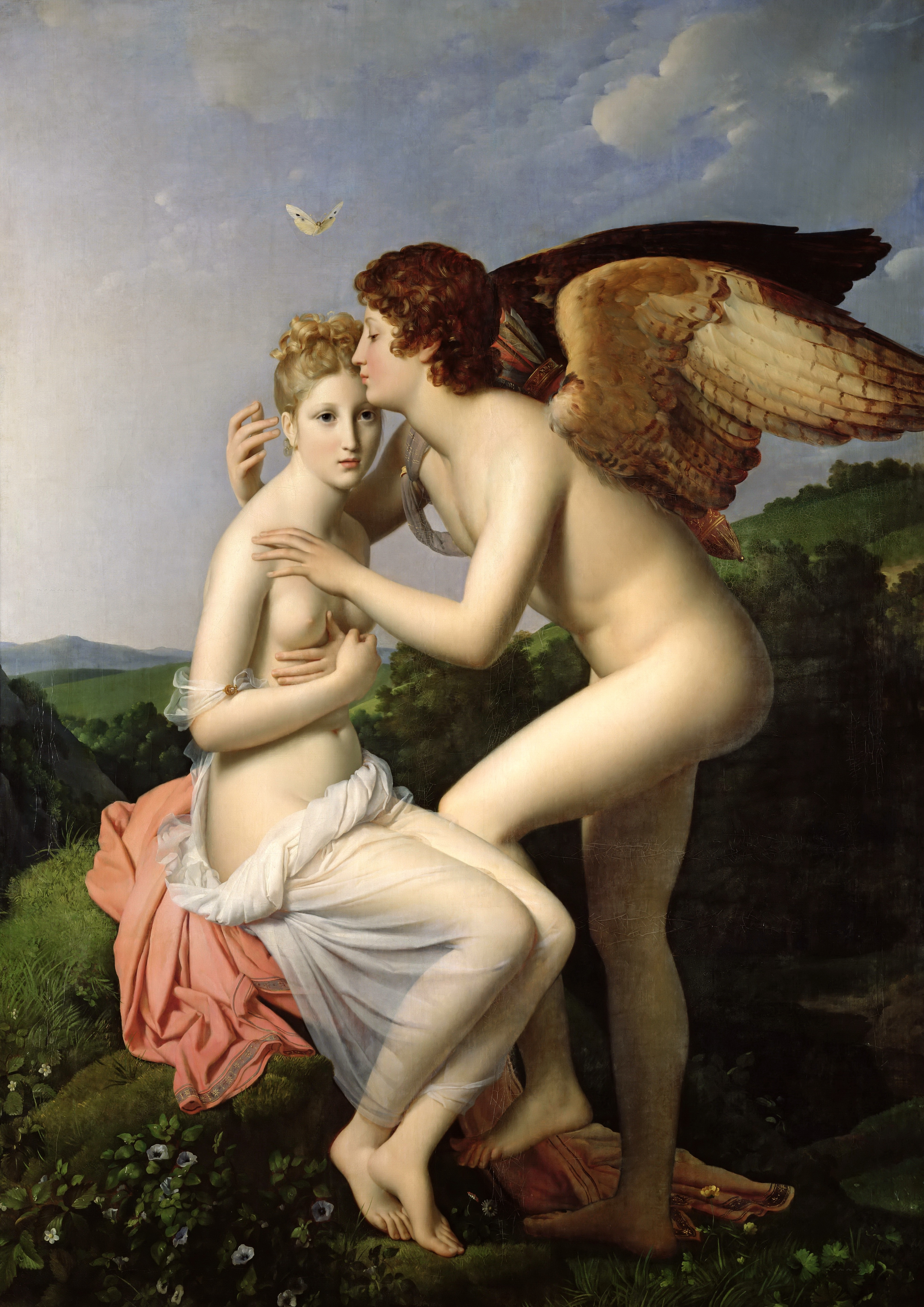
Psyche et l'Amour by François Gérard (1797)

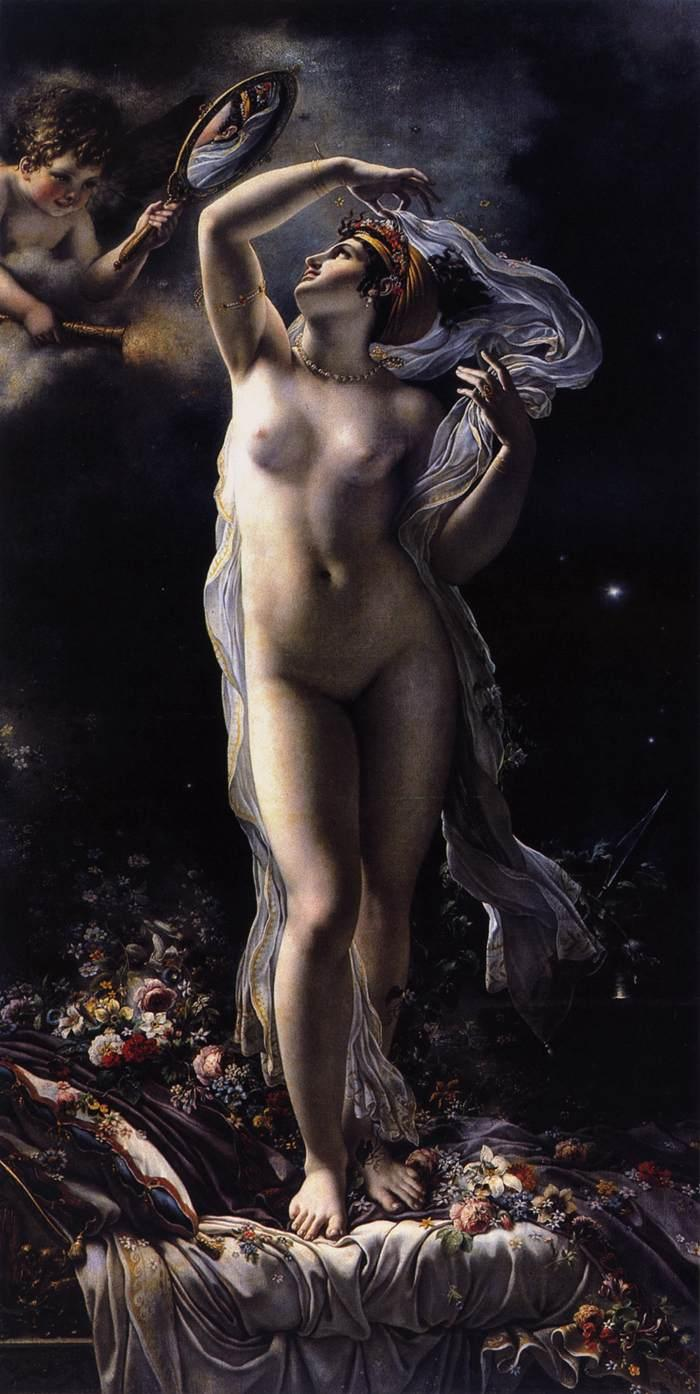
Mademoiselle Lange as Venus, by Anne-Louis Girodet (1798)

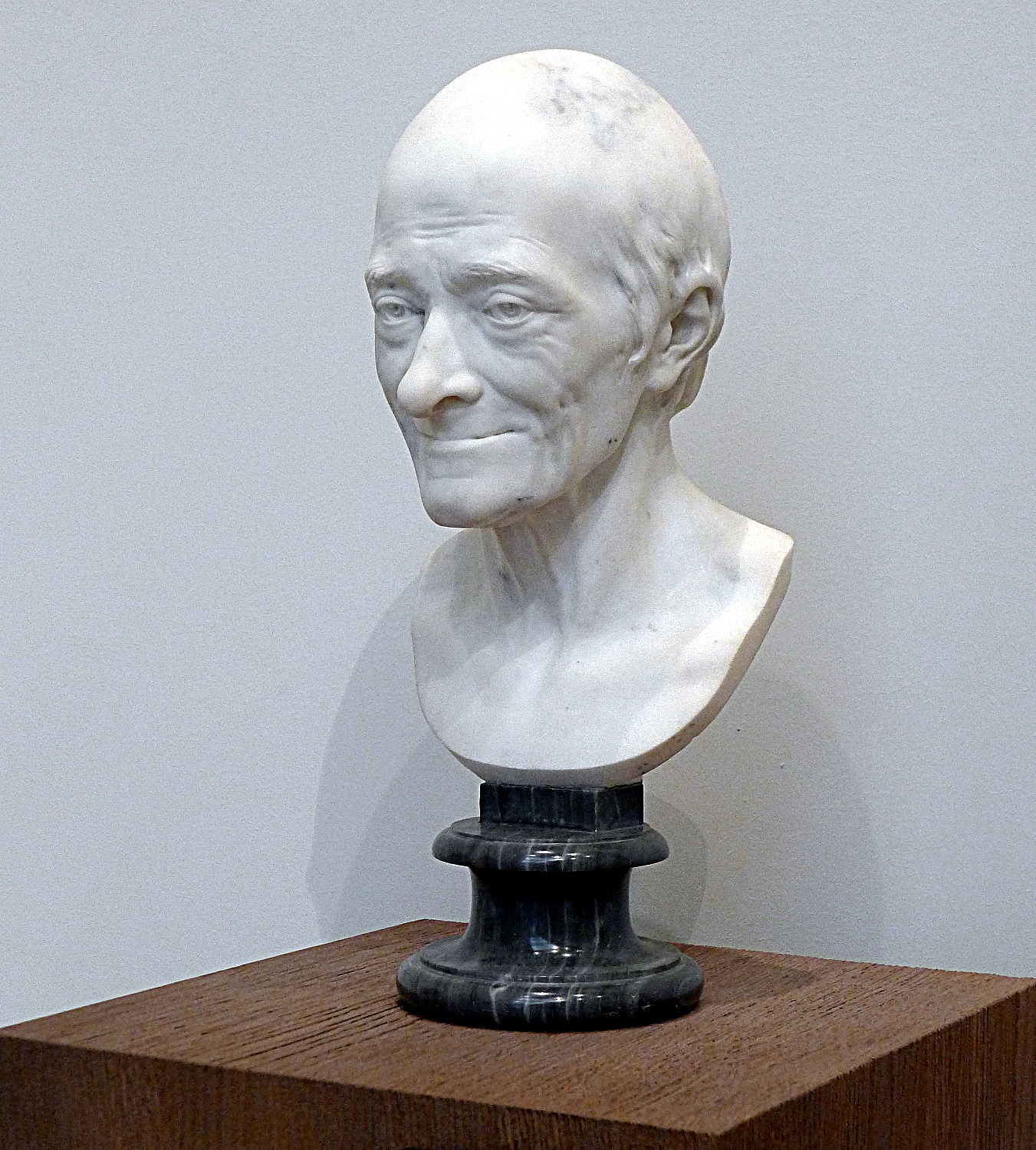
Bust of Voltaire by Jean-Antoine Houdon (1778)

The idea of making the Louvre into an art museum had first been proposed in 1747 by Lafont de Saint-Yenne and supported by Diderot in 1765 in the article on the Louvre in the Encyclopédie. The idea was accepted by Louis XVI, who in 1789 began work on the Grand Gallery of the Louvre. The Revolution intervened, and on 27 July 1793 the Convention decreed the creation of a Museum of the Republic, which opened on 10 August 1793, the anniversary of the storming of the Tuileries.

In 1797, at the end of Napoleon's triumphant first Italian campaign, convoys of wagons began arriving in Paris, carrying bronze horses, Greek antiquities, tapestries, marble statues, paintings and other works of art taken from Italian cities under the terms of peace agreed by the Austrians. They included works by Raphael, Leonardo da Vinci, Titian, Paolo Veronese and other masters. Other convoys arrived from the Netherlands and Flanders with more art from the Spanish provinces. The more famous works were displayed on wagons in a festive victory parade through the center of Paris. The rest was crammed, unwrapped, into the corridors, galleries and stairways of the Louvre. Work began to rebuild the Gallery of Apollo and other galleries to provide a home for the new art.

=== Amusement – the Ball of the Victims, Pleasure Gardens, and new cafés ===
Balls were banned again by Robespierre and the Jacobins, but after their downfall, the city experienced a frenzy of dancing which lasted throughout the period of the French Directory. The Goncourt brothers reported that six hundred forty balls took place in 1797 alone. Several former monasteries were turned into ballrooms, including the Novicial of the Jesuits, the convent of the Carmelites in the Maris, the seminary of Saint Sulpice, and even in the former cemetery Saint-Sulpice. Some of the former palatial townhouses of the nobility were rented and used for ballrooms; the Hotel Longueville put on enormous spectacles, with three hundred couples dancing, in thirty circles of sixteen dancers each, the women in nearly transparent consumes, styled after Roman togas. In the public balls, everyone danced with everyone; merchants, clerks, artisans and workers danced with shop women and seamstresses. In the more popular public balls, the cavaliers were charged 80 sous for admission, while women paid 12 sous. At more exclusive balls, admission was five livres. Aristocrats who had survived or returned from exile held their own balls in their houses in the Faubourg Saint-Germain. There events called "Balls of the Victims" were organized, where the invitees had lost at least one parent to the guillotine.

The formal dancing of the minuet was replaced by a much more passionate new dance, the waltz, which was introduced to Paris during this time from Germany. For summer evening entertainment, Parisians began to abandon the Tuileries Gardens and the gardens of the Palais-Royal and went to the new pleasure gardens which appeared in the neighborhood between the Grand boulevards and the Palais-Royal. The most famous was the Tivoli, located on rue Saint-Lazare, it had belonged to an aristocrat named Boutin, who was guillotined during the reign of terror. It was enormous, forty arpents in size, and could hold as many as ten thousand persons. It had alleys filled with promenaders, greenhouses, illuminations, an orchestra, dancing, a café and fireworks. Other new gardens competed by adding spectacles and pageants. The Élysée offered a pageant of costumed soldiers on horseback performing elaborate maneuvers and firing weapons. The Mouceaux had performers dressed as American Indians dancing and fighting battles. The Pavillon de Hannovre, formerly part of the residential complex of Cardinal Richelieu, featured a terrace for dancing and dining decorated with Turkish tents, Chinese kiosks and lanterns.

Many new restaurants and cafes appeared in and around the Palais-Royal and the new boulevards, usually close to the twenty-three theaters. A new café, Tortoni, specializing in ice creams, opened in 1795 at the corner of rue Taibout and the grand boulevards. The new restaurants in the Palais-Royal were often run by the former chefs of archbishops or nobles who had gone into exile. The restaurant Méot offered a menu with over a hundred dishes. Beside Méot and Beauvilliers, the Palais-Royal had the restaurants Naudet, Robert, Very, Foy and Huré, and the Cafés Berceau, Lyrique, Liberté Conquise, de Chartres, and du Sauvage (the last owned by the former coachman of Robespierre). In the cellars of the Palais-Royal there were more popular cafés, usually with music, smaller menus and more reasonable prices. One restaurant in the cellars, Postal, offered a menu for just 36 sous. Many of the cafes in the cellars had orchestras; the most famous was the Café des Aveugles, which had an orchestra of blind musicians.

Following the end of the reign of terror, the dining hours for upper-class Parisians returned gradually to what they had been before the Revolution, with déjeuner at midday, dinner at 6 or seven in the evening, and supper at 2 in the morning. When the theater performances ended at ten in the evening, the theater audiences went to the nearby cafés on the boulevards.

=== Paris at the end of the century ===
Paris after the end of the terror, as described by the walls covered with old posters and proclamations, fountains without water, abandoned animals roaming the streets. The churches were closed, emptied of paintings and objects of art, the crosses replaced by a red liberty cap on top of a pike, and the words "National Property for sale" painted on the wall. The Cathedral of Notre Dame, the statues removed from its facade and the art from its interior, was used as a storage place for kegs of wine. The Hôtel-Dieu hospital had been renamed the "Hospice of Humanity", and the 130 sisters of the order of Saint Augustine, who had tended the poor, were gone.

Thousands of poor people from the countryside came into seeking the inexpensive bread subsidized by the Commune. Thousands of sellers of wine and spirits set up shop on the streets. The quays of the Seine were transformed into vast outdoor markets, where people sold any bric-a-brac, jewelry or trinkets, books paintings of other items of value they possessed. Many churches and other large buildings had been turned into sales depots, where the belongings of the church or nobles who had emigrated were put on sale. Sainte-Chapelle was turned into a store where papers needed for judicial hearings were sold.

Many prominent historic buildings, including the enclosure of the Temple, the Abbey of Montmartre, and most of the Abbey of Saint-Germain-des-Prés, were nationalized and demolished. Many churches were sold as public property, and were demolished for their stone and other construction material. Henri Grégoire, a priest and elected member of the Convention, invented a new word, "vandalism", to describe the destruction of the churches.

A small group of scholars and historians collected statues and paintings from the demolished churches, and made a storeroom of the old Couvent des Petits-Augustins, in order to preserve them. The paintings went to the Louvre, where the Central Museum of the Arts was opened at the end of 1793. In October 1795, the collection at the Petits-Augustins became officially the Museum of French Monuments.

== Chronology ==
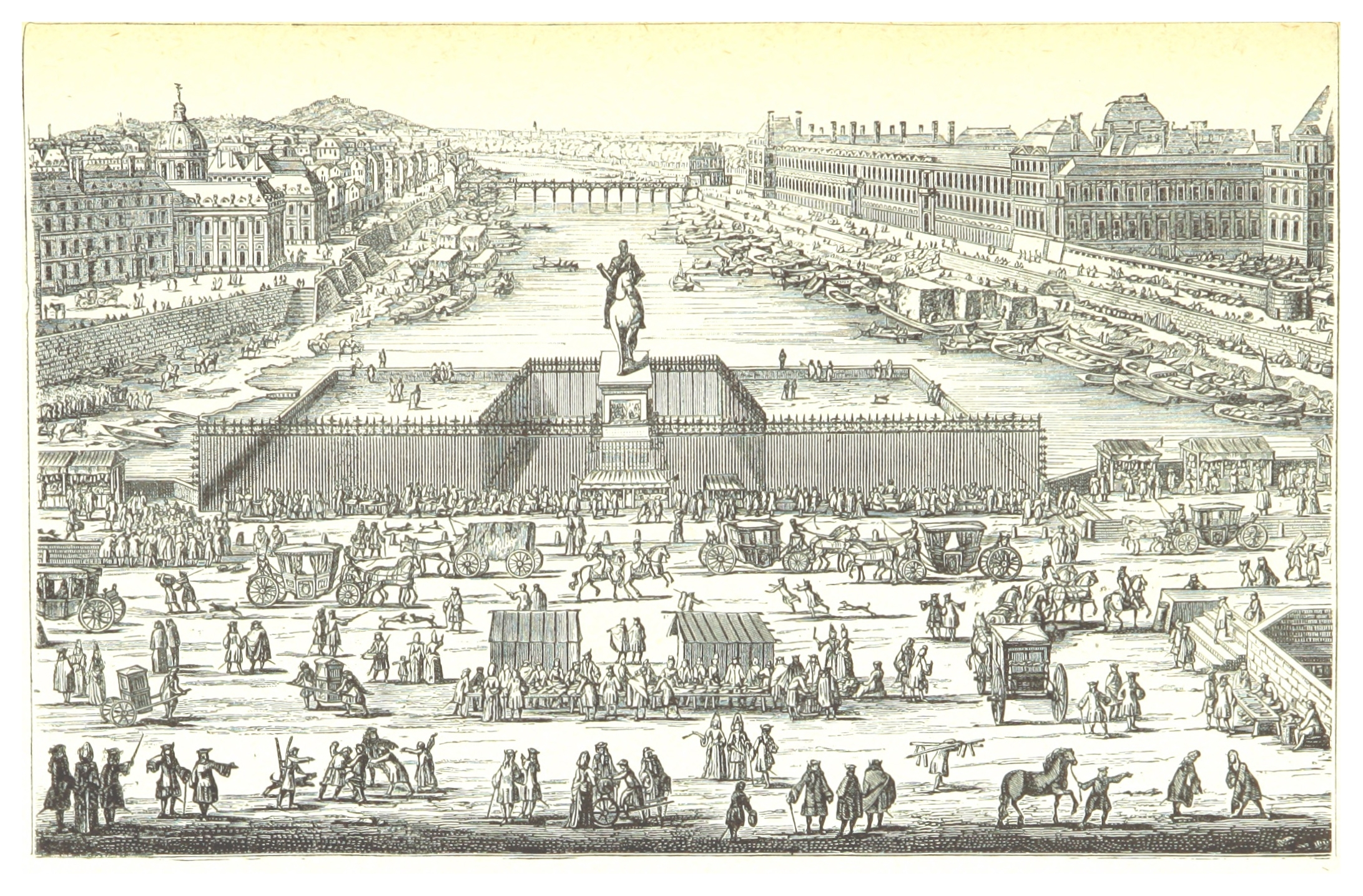
The Pont Neuf, with the statue of Henry IV (1702)

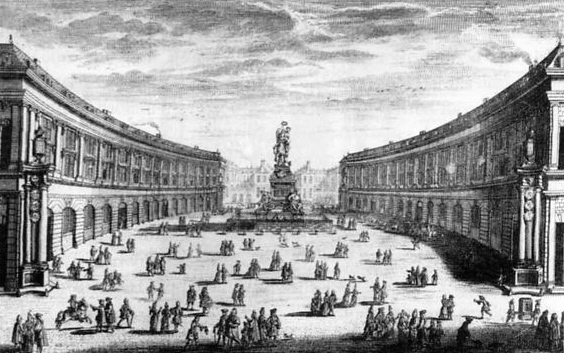
Place des Victoires with a statue of Louis XIV in the center (1710)

- 1701
  - December – A royal edict divides the city into twenty police districts, added to the sixteen quarters created by the Hôtel de Ville.
- 1706
  - 28 August – Consecration of the church of Les Invalides, in the presence of the King.
- 1709
  - 6 January – Extreme cold hits Paris, which will last until the end of March. Temperature drops to -40 Celsius, the Seine freezes, causing shipments of food by boat to be stopped. The cold wave paralyzes all of France, making it also impossible to bring supplies to Paris by road. In that period, twenty-four to thirty thousand persons die from hunger and cold in Paris alone; near one million in all of France.
  - 15 March – Seine begins to thaw, causing flood.
  - 5 April – First food shipment reaching Paris by road.
  - 20 August – Food riot quelled by the army, leaving two dead.
- 1714
  - 7 August – Royal Council prohibits building on the boulevards from the Porte Saint-Honoré to Porte Saint-Antoine without authorization of the Bureau de la Ville.
- 1715
  - 1 September – Death of Louis XIV. Philippe d'Orléans becomes Regent and on 30 December moves the five-year-old King Louis XV and Court from Versailles to Paris.
  - 31 December – An ordinance authorizes the first public ball in Paris, the masked ball at the Paris Opera.
- 1716
  - 2 May – The founding of the Banque Générale, the first private bank in Paris, by the Scotsman John Law.
  - 18 May – The Comédie Italienne theater troupe, banned by Louis XIV in 1697 to perform in Paris, is allowed to return and performs at the Palais Royal.
- 1718
  - 4 December – The Banque Générale becomes the Banque Royale and effectively the central bank of France. Two-thirds of its assets are government bills and notes.
  - 10 July – The construction begins of the Hôtel d'Évreux, the town house of Louis Henri de La Tour d'Auvergne, Count of Évreux, finished in 1720. In the 19th century it became the Élysée Palace, residence of the Presidents of the French Republic.
- 1720
  - Completion of Place Louis-le-Grand, now Place Vendôme.
  - 24 March – John Law's Bank closes, unable to pay its subscribers. Financial panic follows, and the Paris stock market is closed until 1724.
  - 10 July – Rioters storm the Banque Royale, demanding to exchange their banknotes for silver. Banker John Law flees to Brussels, then Venice.
- 1721
  - 28 November – Public execution of the bandit Louis-Dominique Cartouche, famed for robbing the rich and giving to the poor. Thanks to a play about him the same year by the Comédie Italienne, he became a Parisian folk hero.
- 1722
  - Construction begins of the Palais-Bourbon, finished in 1728. After the Revolution of 1789, it became the seat of the National Assembly.

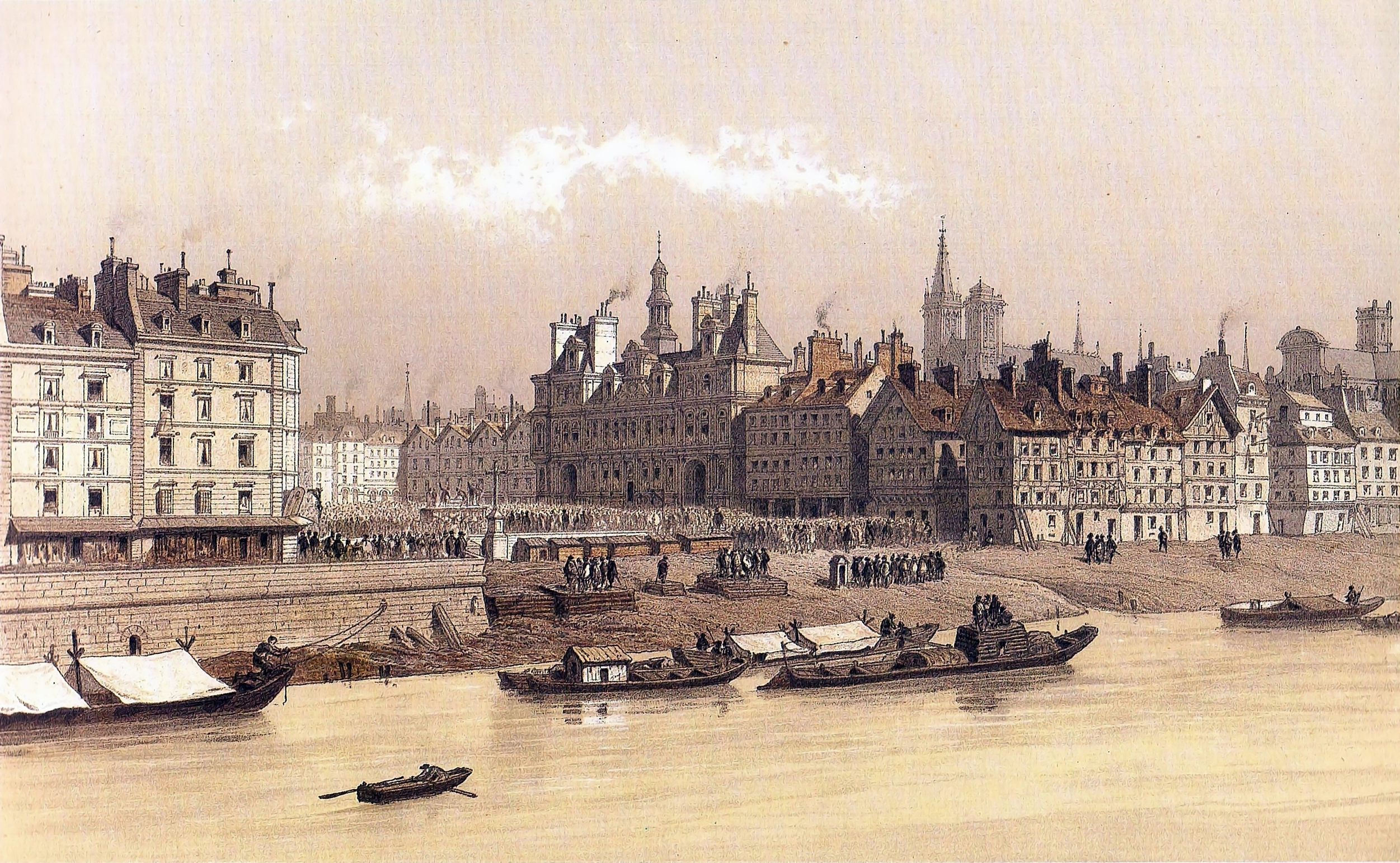
The Hôtel de Ville in 1740

- 1723
  - 23 February – A royal regulation forbids printing houses and publishing outside of the Latin quarter on the Left Bank. The law is intended to make censorship more effective.
- 1728
  - 16 January – First street signs, made of iron painted white with black letters, put in place. They were easy to steal, and in 1729 were replaced by carved stone plaques.
- 1731 – Royal Academy of Surgery established.
- 1732–1775 – Construction of Church of Saint-Sulpice
- 1735
  - 10 September – A new royal regulation simplifies the procedure for searching publishing houses and bookstores, strengthening censorship.
- 1738 – The founding of the royal porcelain manufactory in Vincennes; it was transferred in 1757 to Sèvres.
- 1745
  - 26 March – Permission given by the royal censors for the publication of the first Encyclopédie. It was published between 1751 and 1772.
- 1749
  - March – The exhibition at the Saint-Germain fair of the first rhinoceros ever to be seen in Paris.
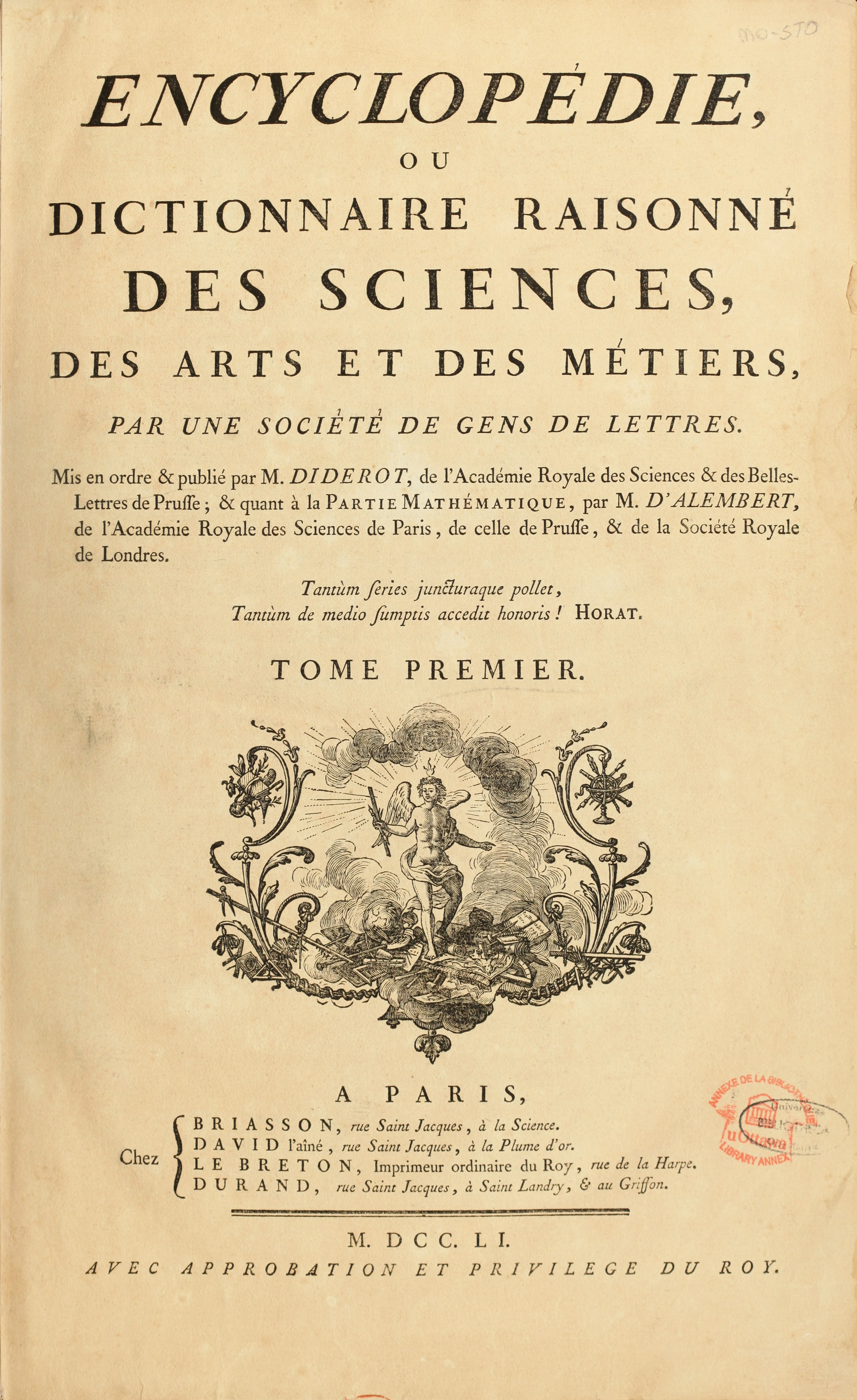
    The Encyclopédie, published in Paris by Diderot and D'Alembert between 1751 and 1772
- 1751
  - 22 January – The École Militaire is established.
- 1752
  - 31 January – The first Encyclopédie is condemned by the archbishop of Paris.
- 1756–1772 – The construction of Place Louis XV (now the Place de la Concorde).
  - Construction begins on the church of Sainte-Geneviève (now the Panthéon).
- 1760
  - 9 June – First postal delivery begins in Paris.
- 1761 – City bans hanging shop signs.
- 1763
  - Bibliothèque historique de la ville de Paris opens.
  - 6 April – A fire destroys the theater of the Palais-Royal. The Paris Opera moves for seven months to the Tuileries Palace.
  - 20 June – Statue of Louis XV dedicated in the Place Louis XV (now Place de la Concorde).
- 1764
  - 3 April – First stone laid of the church of Church of the Madeleine.
  - 6 September – First stone laid of the church of Sainte-Geneviève.
- 1765
  - Almanach des Muses (poetry annual) begins publication.
  - The establishment of Boulanger offers Parisians a choice of "restaurants", namely soups, meat and egg dishes, in competition with existing taverns and cabarets. This was a predecessor of the modern restaurant.
- 1767
  - September – Benjamin Franklin comes to Paris to discuss his experiments with electricity with French scientists
  - 1767–1783 – The grain market (Halle aux Blés) constructed. In 1885 the building became the Paris Chamber of Commerce.
- 1768
  - House numbering ordinance issued.
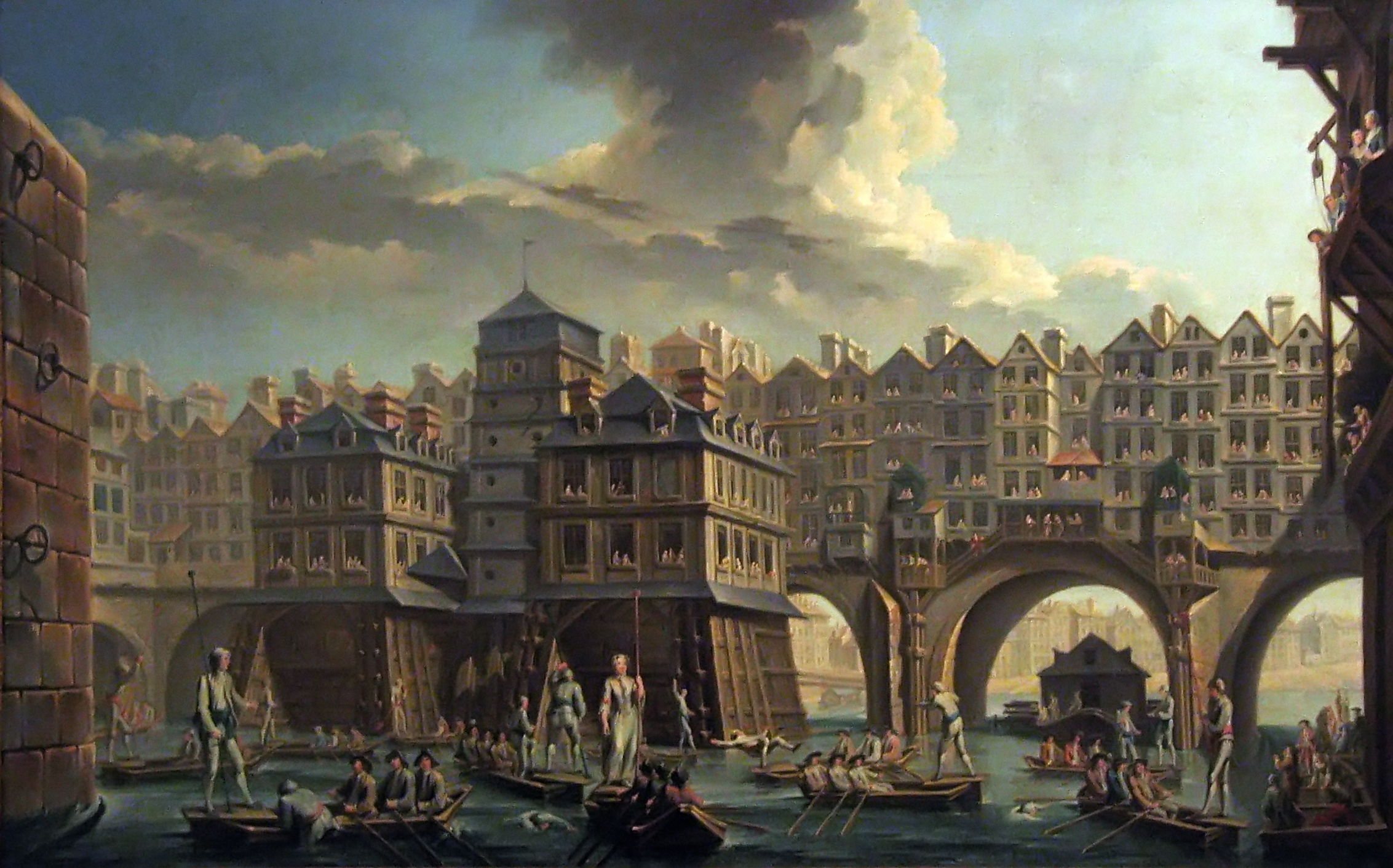
    Pont-au-Change in 1756
- 1770
  - 30 May – Tragic fireworks display, Place Louis XV, during festivities given in celebration of the marriage of the Dauphin and Dauphine (the future King Louis XVI and Queen Marie Antoinette); 132 persons died.
- 1775
  - 23 February – First performance of The Barber of Seville (play) by Pierre Beaumarchais in the theater of the Tuileries Palace.
  - Hôtel des Monnaies (mint) built.
- 1776
  - Cour du Commerce-Saint-André, a covered shopping street in the 6th arrondissement, opens.
  - Royal Society of Medicine established.
  - August – The founding of a corporation of merchants of fashion, also including feather dealers and florists, separate from the corporation of small shopkeepers.
  - 10 August – The opening of the first Paris chemical factory, making sulfuric acid, Javel water and later chlorine, first at Épinay-sur-Seine, then at Javel.
- 1777
  - Mont de Piété established.
  - Journal de Paris newspaper begins publication.
  - The Courrier de la Mode ou Journal du Goût, the first Paris fashion magazine, begins publication.
  - Opening of boulevards du Temple, Saint-Martin, Saint-Denis, and Bonne-Nouvelle.
- 1779
  - First house numbers are put in place, as part of a project of the Almanach of Paris.

=== 1780s–1790s – The French Revolution ===
- 1781
  - First sidewalks in Paris constructed on rue de l'Odéon.
- 1782
  - Amphithéâtre Anglais, the first purpose-built circus in France, opens.
  - Construction begins of the Hôtel de Salm, finished in 1784. After the Revolution of 1789, it became the Palais de la Légion d'Honneur.
- 1783
  - Royal decrees requiring a relation between the height of buildings and the width of the street, and declaring that new streets must be at least thirty feet (about ten meters) wide.
  - 3 September – Treaty of Paris signed at 56 rue Jacob by Benjamin Franklin, John Jay, John Adams and Henry Laurens for the United States and David Hartley for Britain, ending the American Revolution.

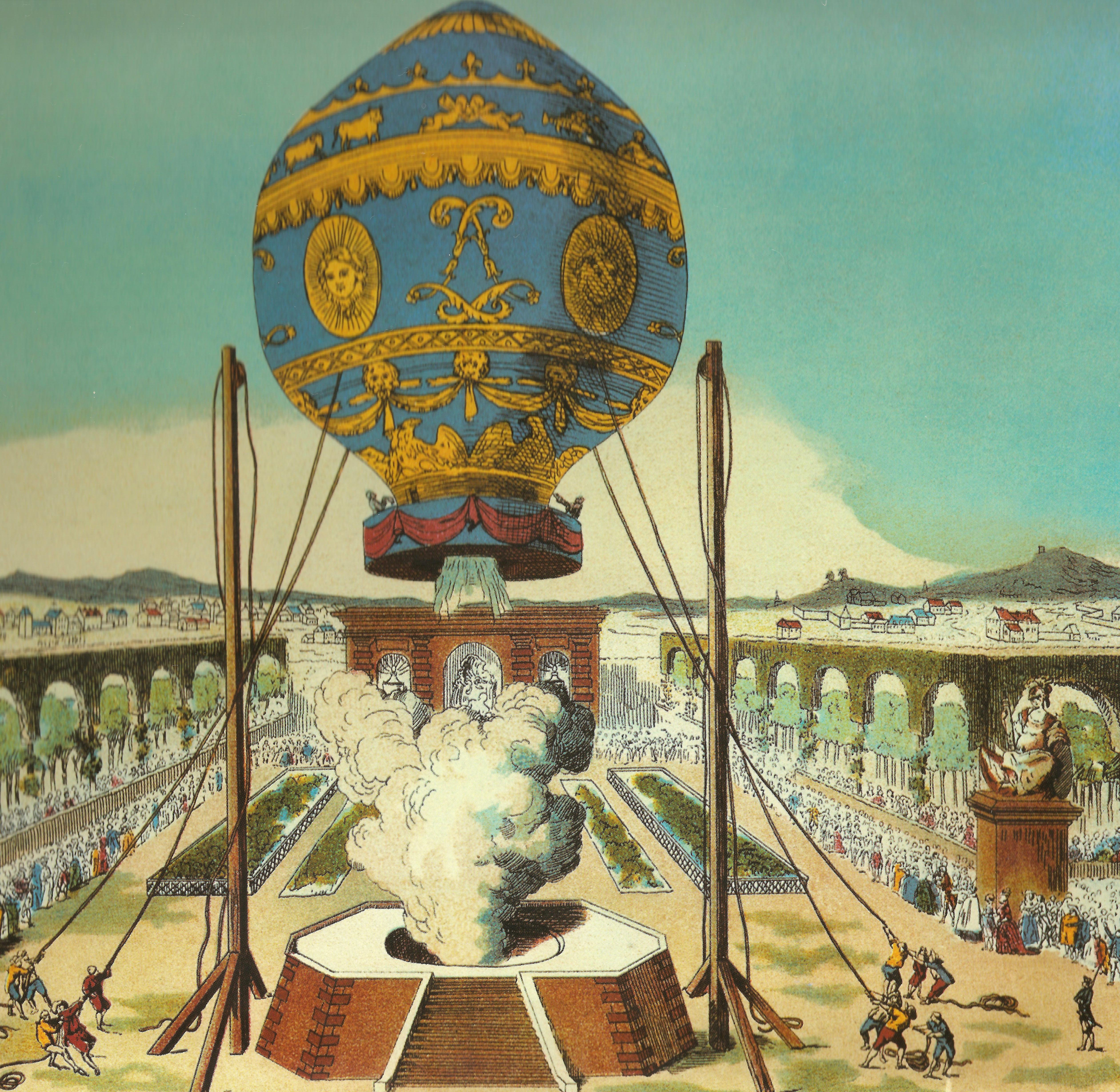
Depiction of the Montgolfier brothers' first balloon ascension, a captive ascension with two men aboard, on 19 October 1783, in the gardens of the royal wallpaper manufacturer Jean-Baptiste Réveillon, in the faubourg Saint-Antoine, in Paris. Picture was published in Journal officiel n° 299, dated 26 October 1783.

  - 21 November – The first manned free flight in a balloon launched by the Montgolfier brothers, between the parc de la Muette and the Butte-aux-Cailles.
  - École des Mines established.
- 1784 – Wall of the Farmers-General construction begins.
- 1785
  - Closing of the cemetery of the Saints-Innocents. The church was closed in 1786 and demolished the following year.
- 1786
  - Galerie de bois (shopping arcade) opens in the Palais-Royal.
  - 8 June – A decree of the Prévôt de Paris authorized caterers and chefs to establish restaurants and to serve clients until eleven in the evening in winter and midnight in summer.
  - The first restaurant in the modern sense, the Taverne anglaise, is opened by Antoine Beauvilliers in the arcade of the Palais-Royal.
  - Construction begins of a large steam-powered pump at Gros-Caillou, on the Quai d'Orsay, to provide drinking water from the Seine for the population of the left bank.
  - September – A royal edict orders the demolition of houses built on the Paris bridges and on some of the quays. The edict was carried out in 1788.
- 1787
  - The duc d'Orléans sells spaces in the arcades of the Palais-Royal which are occupied by cafés, restaurants and shops.
  - Construction approved of the Pont Louis XVI, now Pont de la Concorde.
- 1788
  - 13 July – Devastating hail storms accompanied by strong winds of a force rarely seen, following a path from the southwest of France to the north, destroyed crops, orchards, killed farm animals, tore roofs and toppled steeples. In Paris, the faubourg Saint-Antoine was hardest hit. It caused a major increase in bread prices, and the migration of thousands of peasants into Paris.
  - 16 August – The French state becomes bankrupt, and begins issuing paper money to pay for pensions, rents and the salaries of soldiers. Large-scale demonstrations and civil disorders begin.
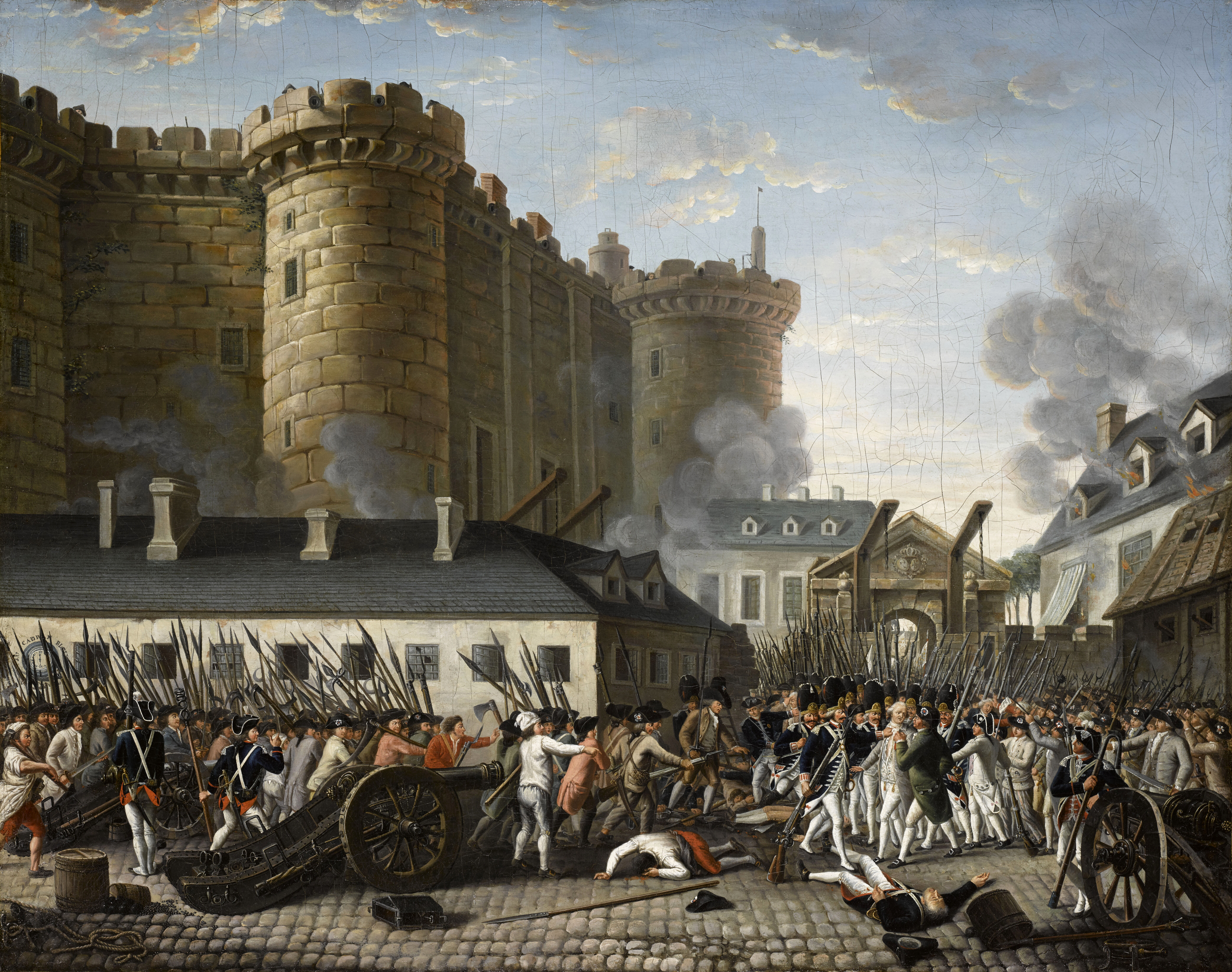
    The storming of the Bastille (14 July 1789). Anonymous.
- 1789
  - 12–19 May – Paris elects deputies to the Estates-General, a legislative assembly summoned by Louis XVI to raise funds.
  - 12 July – Parisians respond to the dismissal of the King's reformist minister, Necker, with civil disturbances. Confrontations between Royal-Allemand Dragoon Regiment and a crowd of protestors on Place Louis XV, and Sunday strollers in the Tuileries gardens. Mobs storm the city armories and take weapons. In the evening, the new customs barriers around the city are burned.
  - 14 July – Storming of the Bastille, a symbol of royal authority, releasing seven prisoners. The governor of the Bastille surrenders and is lynched by the crowd.
  - 15 July – The astronomer Jean Sylvain Bailly is chosen mayor of Paris at the Hôtel de Ville.
  - 17 July – King Louis XVI comes to the Hôtel de Ville and accepts a tricolor cockade.
  - 5–6 October – The royal family is forced to move from Versailles to Paris.
  - 19 October – The deputies of the National Assembly move from Versailles to Paris, first to the residence of the Archbishop, then, on 9 November, to the Manège of the Tuileries Palace.
  - Théâtre Feydeau founded.
- 1790
  - 14 July – The Fête de la Fédération, celebrating the first anniversary of the Revolution.
- 1791
  - 3 April – The church of Sainte-Geneviève is transformed into the Panthéon. Mirabeau is the first famous Frenchman to have his tomb placed there on April 4, followed by Voltaire on 11 July.
  - 20–21 June – The King and his family flee Paris, but are captured at Varennes and brought back on 25 June.
  - 17 July – A large demonstration on the Champ de Mars demands the immediate proclamation of a republic. The National Assembly orders Mayor Bailly to disperse the crowd. Soldiers fire on the crowd, killing many.
  - 19 September – Mayor Bailly resigns.
- 1792

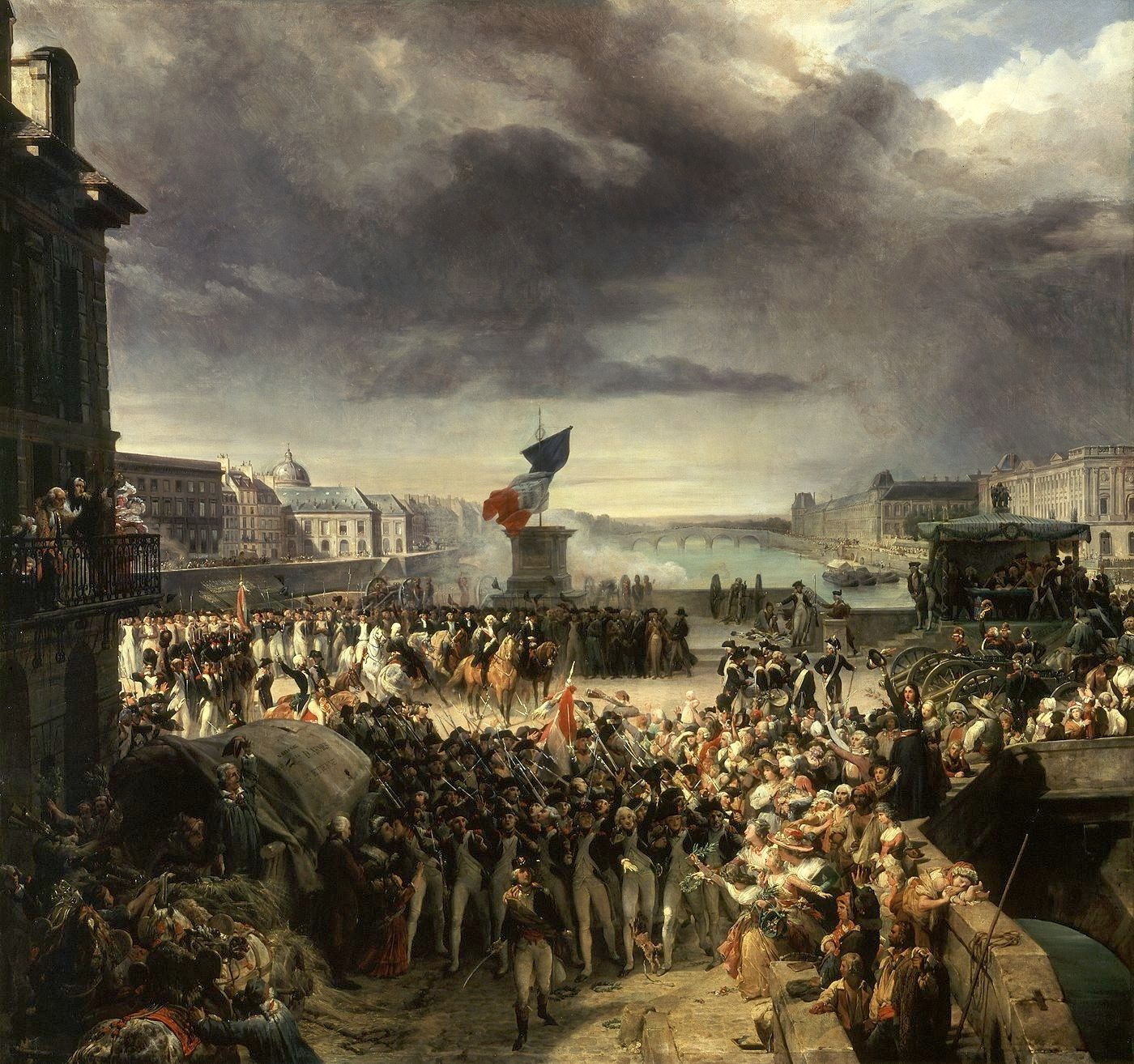
The National Guard of Paris Departs for the Army by Léon Cogniet

  - 25 April – First execution using the guillotine of the bandit Nicolas Pelletier on the Place de Grève.
  - 20 June – Sans-culottes invade the Tuileries Palace and put a red Phrygian cap on king Louis XVI's head.
  - 20 July – Government calls for volunteers for the army, and on June 21 proclaims that the country is in danger of foreign attack.
  - 10 August – The insurrectional Paris Commune seizes the Hôtel de Ville and the Tuileries Palace, and suspends the power of the king.
  - 2–5 September – Massacre of more than 1,300 persons in Paris prisons, among which the princesse de Lamballe.
  - 21 September – Proclamation of the French Republic by the Convention, the new National Assembly.
  - Théâtre du Vaudeville opens.
  - 20 November – Discovery of the Armoire de fer, an iron box containing documents incriminating Louis XVI, in his apartment at the Tuileries.
  - 10 to 26 December – King Louis XVI's trial.
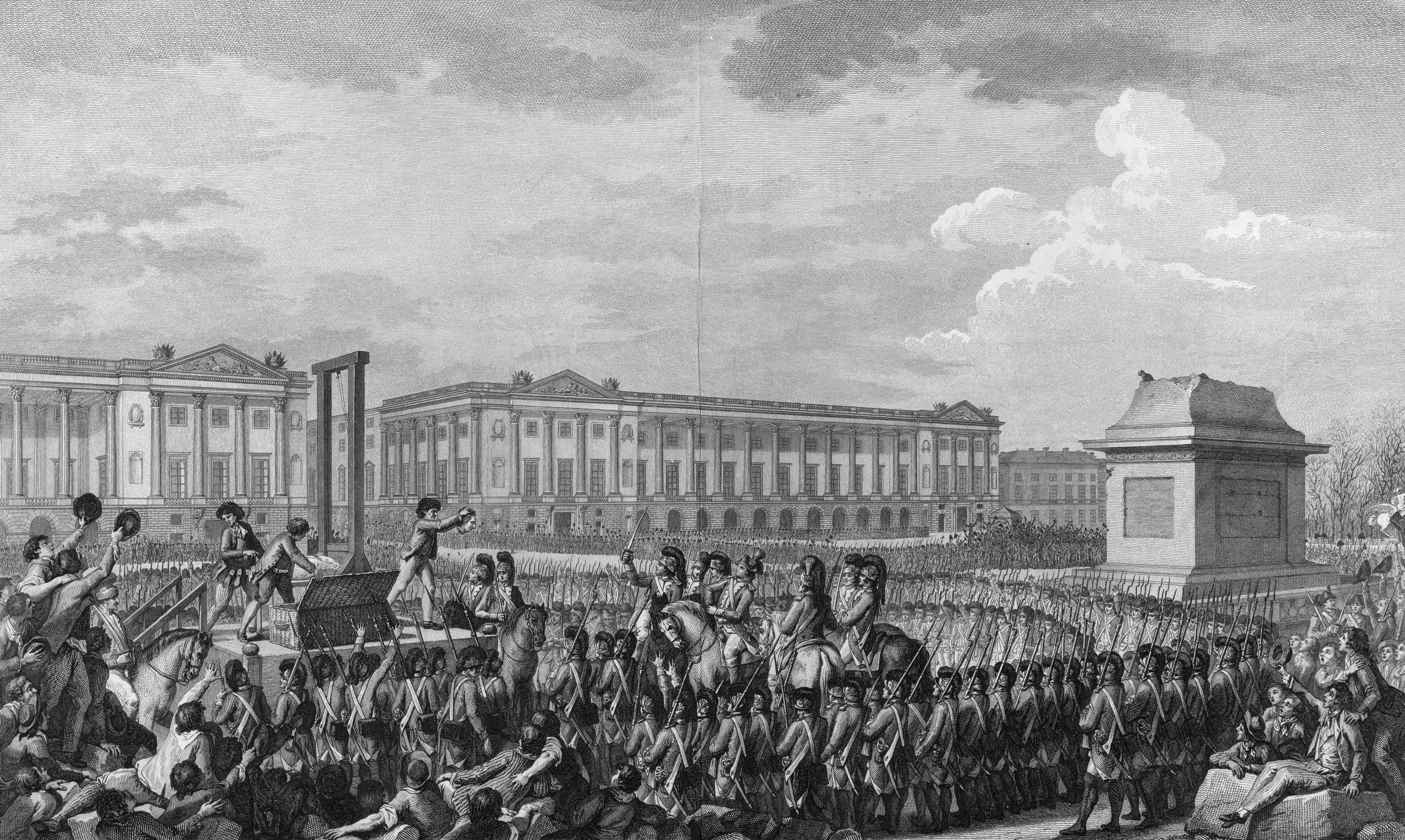
    The execution of King Louis XVI on the Place de la Révolution, 21 January 1793. Bibliothèque nationale de France
- 1793
  - 21 January – Execution of Louis XVI on the Place de la Révolution (former Place Louis XV, now Place de la Concorde).
  - 10 March – Creation of the Revolutionary Tribunal to judge enemies of the Revolution.
  - 16 October – Execution of queen Marie Antoinette on the Place de la Révolution.
  - 6 November – Execution of Louis Philippe II, Duke of Orléans, Philippe-Égalité, on the Place de la Révolution.
  - 8 November – Opening of the Museum Central des Arts, (later named the Louvre Museum).
  - 12 November – French citizens are required by law to use the familiar personal pronoun "tu" form instead of the formal "vous".
  - 23 November – All the churches of Paris are ordered closed by the government.
  - National Museum of Natural History (founded in 1635) re-organized and renamed.
- 1794
  - 30 March – Arrest of Georges Danton, chief opponent of Robespierre. He is guillotined 5 April.
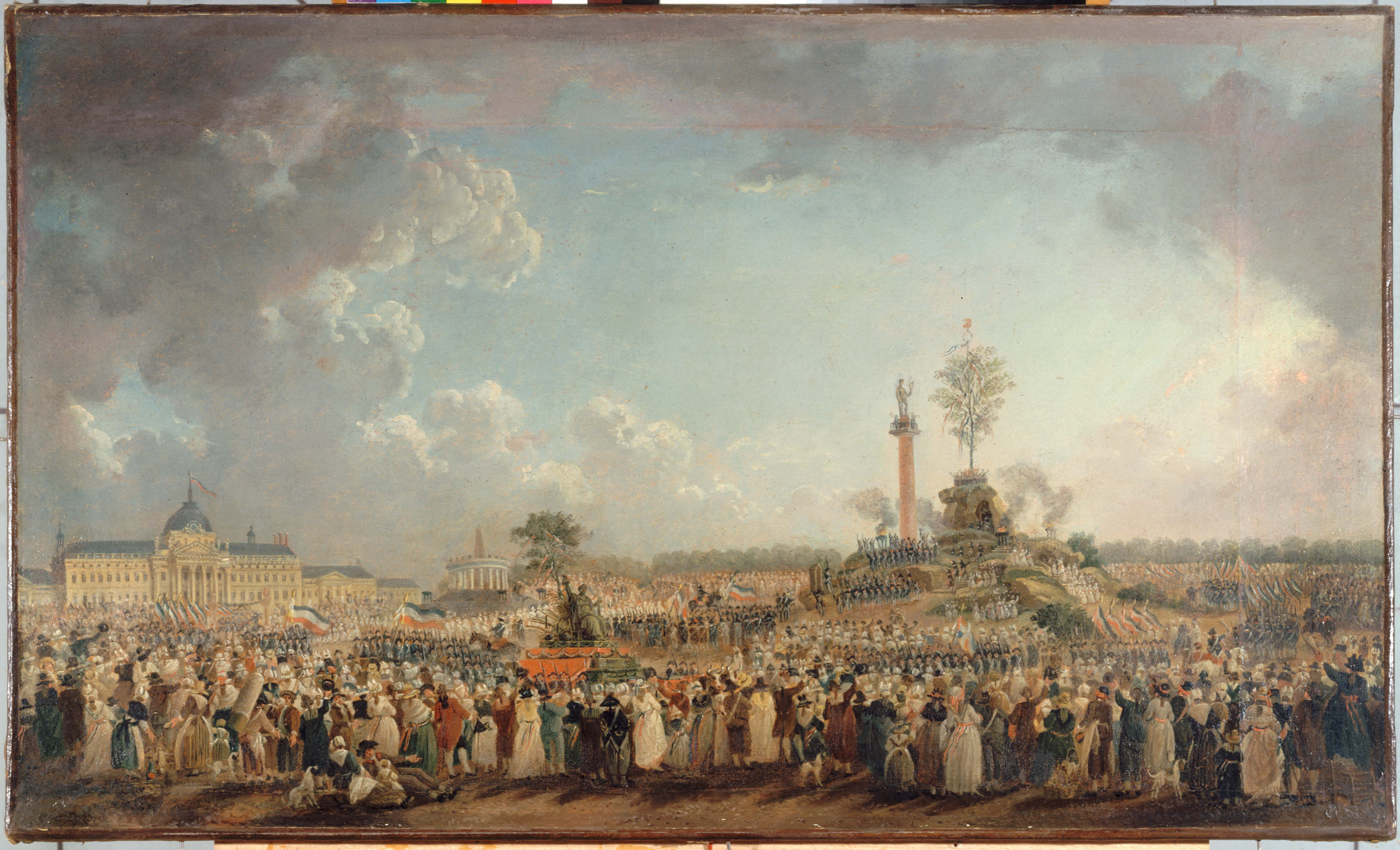
    The Festival of the Supreme Being, by Pierre-Antoine Demachy, 8 June 1794.
  - 8 June – Celebration of the Cult of the Supreme Being held on Champ de Mars, presided over by Robespierre.
  - 11 June – Beginning of the climax of Reign of Terror, period known as the Grande Terreur. Between June 11 and 27 July, 1,366 persons are condemned to death.
  - 27 July – 9th Thermidor, the Convention accuses Robespierre of crimes. He is arrested together with several of his acolytes, among which Saint-Just.
  - 28 July – Robespierre and those arrested with him are guillotined, this signaling the end of the Reign of Terror.
  - 24 August – The revolutionary committees of the twelve Paris sections are abolished, and replaced by new arrondissement committees.
  - 31 August – The municipal government of Paris is abolished, and the city put directly under the national government.
  - 22 October – The École centrale des travaux publics, predecessor of the École Polytechnique (school) established.
- 1795
  - 20 May – Rioting sans-culottes invade the Convention meeting hall, demanding "bread and the 1793 Constitution". Army troops loyal to the government occupy the Faubourg Saint-Antoine and disarm demonstrators.
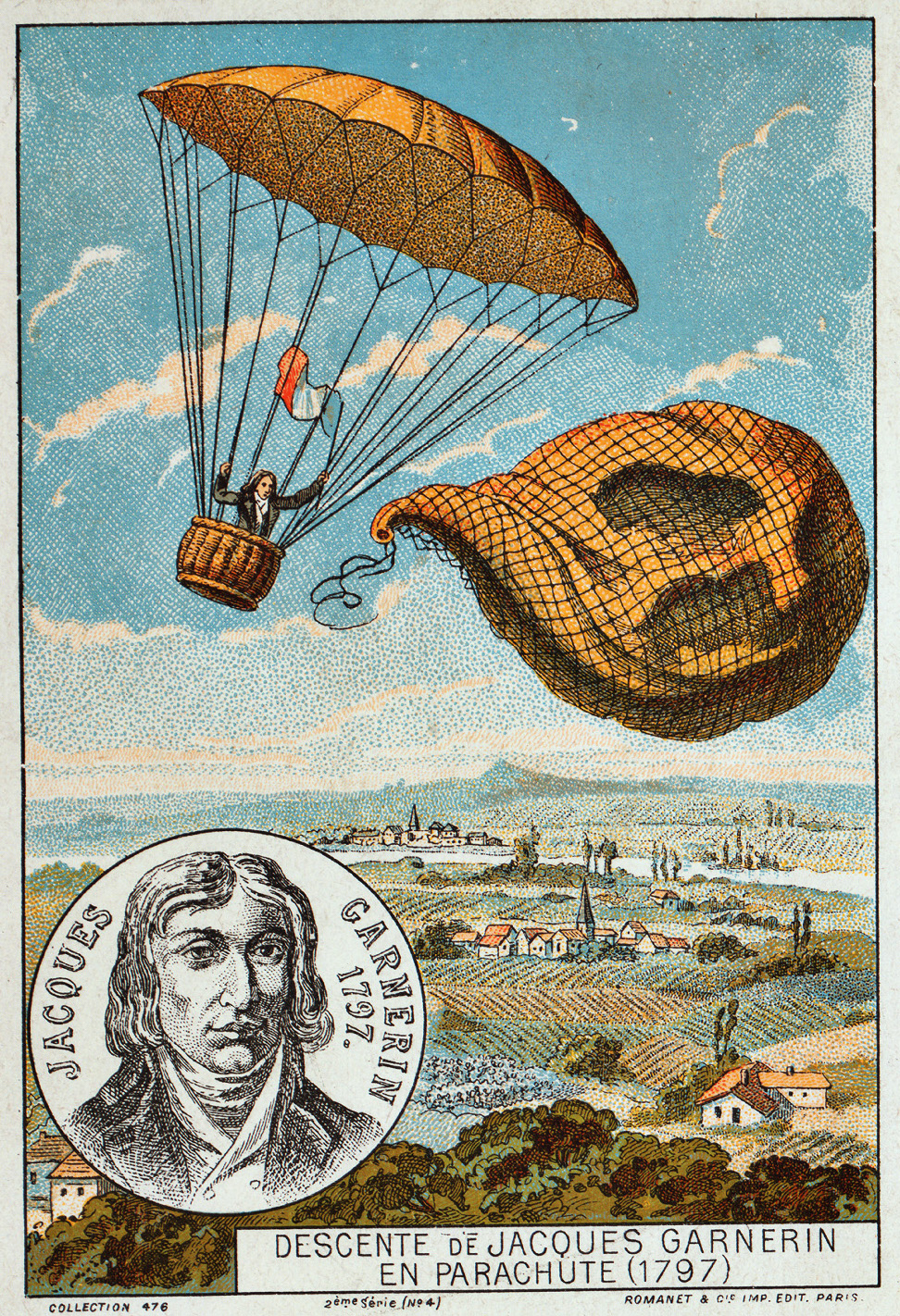
    First use of a frameless parachute from a Montgolfier balloon over Paris by André Garnerin in 1797
  - 5 October – An uprising by royalists in the center of the city is suppressed with artillery fire by General Napoleon Bonaparte.
  - 11 October – Paris is once again organized into twelve municipalities, within the new department of the Seine.
  - 2 November – The Directory government is established.
- 1796 – Society of Medicine of Paris established.
- 1797
  - Arsenal Library opens.
  - 22 October – First parachute jump with a frameless parachute made by André Garnerin from a Montgolfier balloon at an altitude of 700 meters over the Plaine de Monceau.
- 1799
  - Passage du Caire (shopping arcade) opens.
  - 10 November – Coup d'état du 18 brumaire, Napoléon Bonaparte stages a coup d'état and dissolves the government of the Directory.
  - 25 December – The Consulate is organized, with Napoléon Bonaparte as First Consul.
