= The Attributes of Music, the Arts and the Sciences =

Three paintings by Jean Siméon Chardin

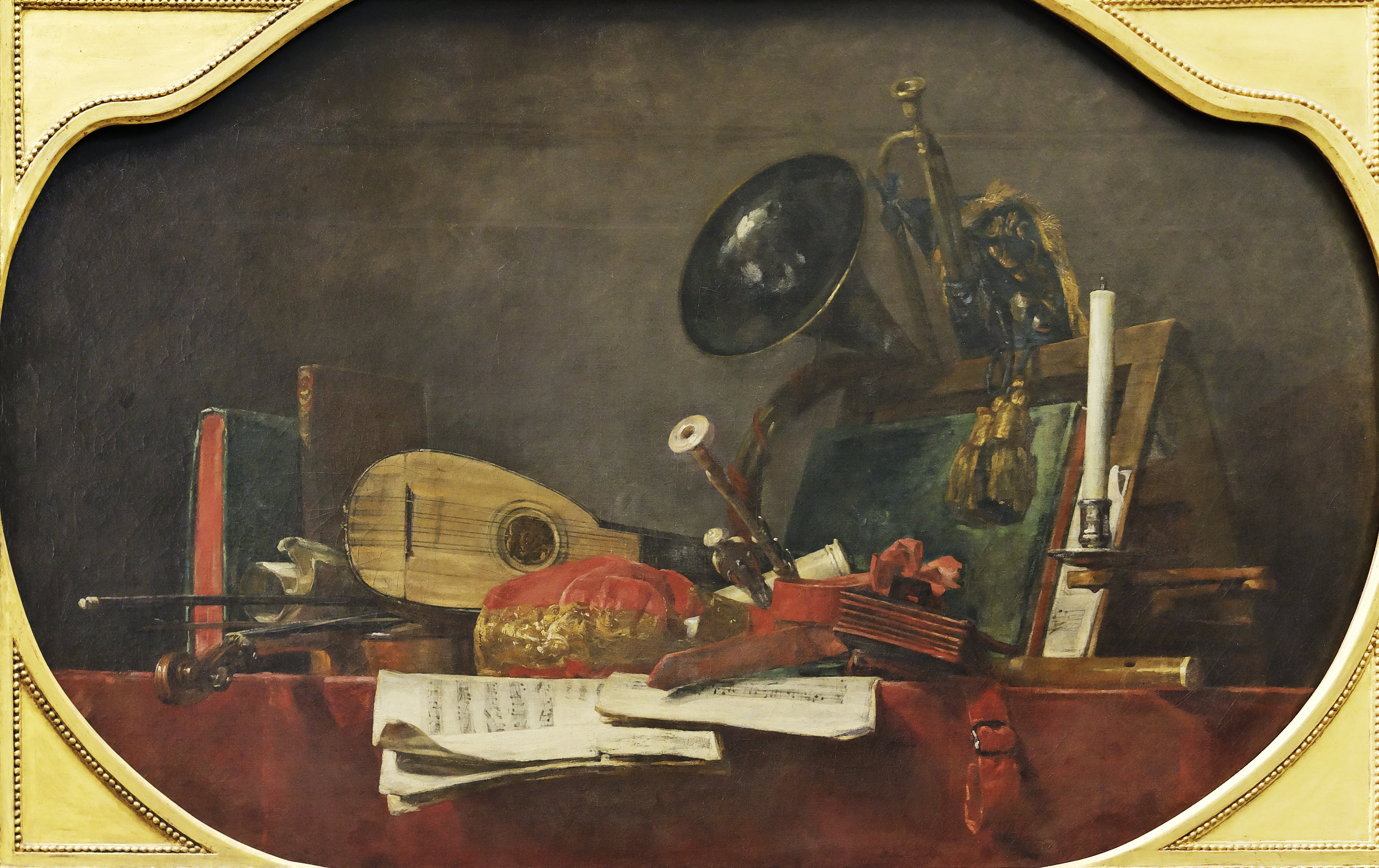
The Attributes of Music

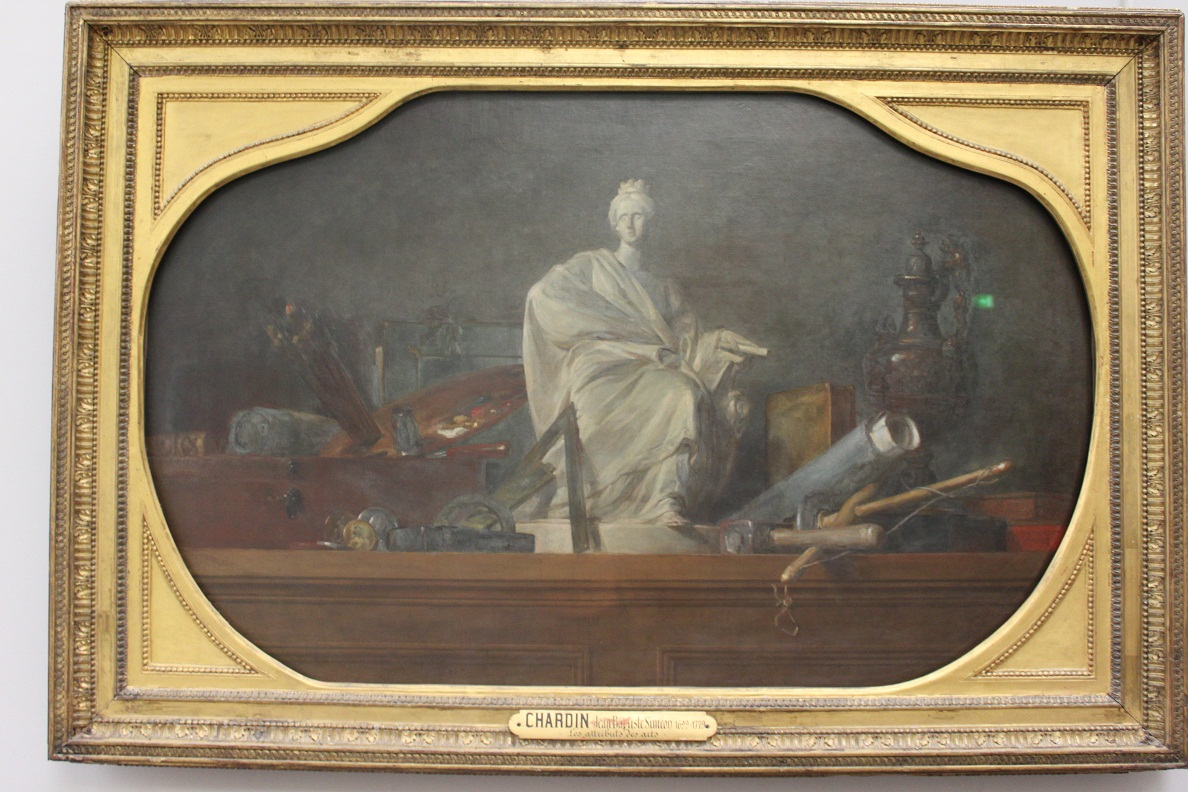
The Attributes of the Arts

The Attributes of the Arts, The Attributes of Music and The Attributes of the Sciences are three paintings by the French painter Jean Siméon Chardin. They were commissioned in 1764 by the marquis de Marigny, younger brother of Madame de Pompadour and exhibited at the Salon the following year. At the centre of Arts is a model for Edmé Bouchardon's statue personifying Paris for the fontaine de Grenelle. Arts and Music are now in the Musée du Louvre and Sciences has disappeared.
