= Bust of Sir John Gordon =

In 1728, the French artist Edme Bouchardon sculpted a marble bust of Sir John Gordon, a young Scottish aristocrat from Easter Ross, when Sir John was in Rome on his Grand Tour. The bust, seen as an example of Bouchardon's ushering in of Neoclassicism, was bought by the town council of Invergordon in 1930 for £5. It gained notoriety in 1998 after a local councillor came across it on Highland Council premises and claimed it had been found propping up the door of a shed. It is locally referred to as the "Bouchardon Bust". The Highland Council voted to sell the bust, which has been valued at £3.1 million. In January 2026, the UK government announced, pending the potential sale of the item, that it would bar the export of the bust from the UK, at least until April 2026.

== Description and background ==
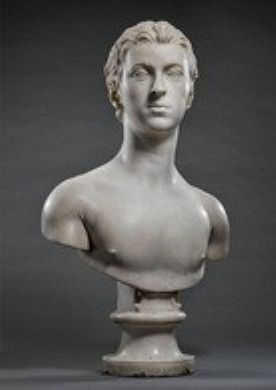
Bust of John Gordon of Invergordon by Edmé Bouchardon, completed in Rome in 1728.

The sculpture depicts a young Sir John Gordon. He later became the Prince of Wales's Secretary for Scotland (1745-1751), M.P. for Cromartyshire, and a significant landowner in the town of Invergordon in the Scottish Highlands. The town, previously called Inverbreakie, was renamed by Gordon's father Sir William, who had purchased it. Gordon met the French sculptor Edmé Bouchardon in Rome in 1728 while on his Grand Tour.

Bouchardon was aged 30 and studying at the Académie de France in Rome at the time; Gordon would have been about 20.

The work was described by Stuart Lochhead, an independent assessor on the Reviewing Committee on the Export of Works of Art and Objects of Cultural Interest, as remarkable:

Gordon is portrayed bare-chested, evoking some of the classical sculpture Bouchardon studied at the French Academy in Rome. This rare approach reflects the artist’s ambition to merge ancient nobility with eighteenth-century elegance. A striking example of Bouchardon’s mastery and Scotland’s participation in the Grand Tour, the sculpture combines historical significance, rarity, and superb quality. This exceptional work of art deserves to be saved for the nation.

— Reviewing Committee case hearing - Bust of Sir John Gordon, https://www.artscouncil.org.uk/media/24474/download?attachment

The official description of the work is as follows: "John Gordon of Invergordon By Edme Bouchardon (1698–1762), French, 1728, made in Rome. Marble. Height 81 cm; width 51 cm. Inscription, on the bottom edge of the left arm: Edmund. Bouchardon Faciebat Romae; on the cartouche: JOHN GORDON ESQ.R; around the base: ANNO.AETATIS.XX.MDCCXXVIII."

The work, commissioned probably by John Gordon himself, remained in his possession until his death in 1783. The bust survived a fire at Invergordon Castle in the 19th century. It was held by the related Mackenzie family, being inherited by descent until 1930, when Kindeace House, near Invergordon, was put up for auction. The town council of the then Burgh of Invergordon made a successful bid for the bust of £5 and placed the artwork in Invergordon Town Hall in February 1930. Ross and Cromarty District Council then took over the local government for Invergordon in 1975, which was in turn replaced by the Highland Council in 1999. At some stage within these local government changes the bust ended up in storage.

== Rediscovery and potential sale ==
The sculpture first attracted attention when Maxine Smith, then a councillor on the Invergordon Community Council, had been trying to find the robes of town's former provosts in 1998. She said that she was told that they were likely to have been stored in a shed in Balintore. According to her account, which had even been reported internationally, the shed was opened and the bust of Sir John Gordon was propping open an interior door.

Despite its being reported around the world, this account was contradicted by Colin MacKenzie, a founding member of the Invergordon Museum and the former insurance officer at the Highland Council responsible for taking care of the bust. He stated that "it was not propping open a door when found nor was it found in the alleged shed." Instead, Mr. MacKenzie maintains that it was "never forgotten" and that the bust had been properly inventoried and stored along with 248 other local museum-related objects in a Locality Office.

The Ross and Cromarty Heritage site wrote that Charles Pearson, a retired art history teacher, had noticed the bust previously exhibited at a local craft fair and had recognised its significance. Pearson sought to identify the bust by contacting the Scottish National Portrait Gallery, the Ashmolean Museum and the Louvre. Shortly afterwards, the bust featured in a scholarly article as an example of Bouchardon's classicising portraiture of British sitters in Rome.

Proof of ownership of the bust was sought, and the town's records confirmed that it was purchased by Invergordon Town Council at auction for £5 in 1930 (equivalent to £283 in 2025). It was valued at £1.4 million by Sotheby's auction house in 2023. A private buyer approached Highland Council with an offer of more than £2.5 million for the bust. Charles Pearson died in 2015 and desired that the bust be given to the National Museum of Scotland.

In the 2010s, the Highland Council had suggested selling the bust and keeping any resultant funds. The proposal was opposed by Rob Gibson, Member of the Scottish Parliament for Caithness, Sutherland and Ross. Gibson had believed that the bust had been bequeathed in the 1920s to the community of Invergordon.

In 2016 the bust was included in a major international monographic exhibition of Bouchardon's works, entitled "Bouchardon: Royal Artist of the Enlightenment". Thus, the sculpture was exhibited at both the Louvre in Paris and the J. Paul Getty Museum in Los Angeles.

When she became a member of the Highland Council, Ms Smith supported selling the bust to fund projects for the benefit of the local community. In February 2022, the Easter Ross Committee decided to look into selling the bust, despite its status as an inalienable asset. In August 2023, an offer was made by a private overseas buyer to purchase the bust for £2.5 million. The Invergordon Common Good Fund would benefit from any sale of the bust; in the meantime, the bust was kept in storage by Highland Council.

The Highland Council then initiated a statutory public consultation on the potential sale in January 2024. The consultation document, on which the Councillors in part based their vote, explicitly and repeatedly stated that: "because of the value of the Bust, and security concerns, it has not been possible to put it on public display locally."

Two art historians also weighed in. Bendor Grosvenor suggested the bust be loaned to Inverness Museum, the National Galleries of Scotland or the National Museum of Scotland. Caroline McCaffrey-Howarth said that it was likely to be the only Bouchardon sculpture in Scotland and that rules around the export of significant works of art might prevent its overseas dispersal.

The Council's consultation obtained 67 responses, of which 48 against 19 (which also included two community councils, that of Invergordon and Saltburn) supported selling the bust. On 27 June 2024, the full Highland Council voted to "dispose of the Bust of Sir John Gordon by sale."

The Council was required to seek Court approval to sell the inalienable asset, under the terms of section 75(2) Local Government (Scotland) Act 1973. The Tain Sheriff Court granted its approval on 7 November 2024.

The Invergordon Naval Museum & Heritage Centre formally objected to the sale of the bust under the Waverley Criteria. The potential sale of the bust was placed on hold by the UK Culture Minister pending an independent review of whether the bust meets the three Waverley Criteria, namely, historical, aesthetic, and scholarly, and whether the export licence should be deferred.

== An export ban and the search for a UK buyer ==
On 9 January 2026, the UK government announced that a temporary export ban would be placed on any sale of the bust, lasting until 8 April 2026, to allow for a potential UK buyer to come forward. This announcement was prompted by advice from the Reviewing Committee on the Export of Works of Art and Objects of Cultural Interest (RCEWA), made up of 11 members, which concluded unanimously that all three Waverley Criteria were met and that the bust represented a work of "outstanding" cultural, historical, and scholarly importance to Britain. The Committee gave an estimated value of the piece as £3.1 million at 2025 prices.

The National Galleries of Scotland ruled out making a bid to buy the bust. The only UK buyer to have come forward was the Invergordon Naval Museum & Heritage Centre, which must raise the £3.1 million price to purchase the bust from the Highland Council. The Museum has published its proposal on its website. This proposal has triggered a second deferral period to allow the Museum five months to match the foreign buyer's price. The Museum has launched a crowdfunder in an effort to raise money from the local community.

If the Museum does not meet the Highland Council's selling price by the end of the second deferral period (1 December 2026), the ban will be lifted and the Council will then be able to sell the bust abroad.
