= Edmé Bouchardon =

French sculptor (1698–1762)

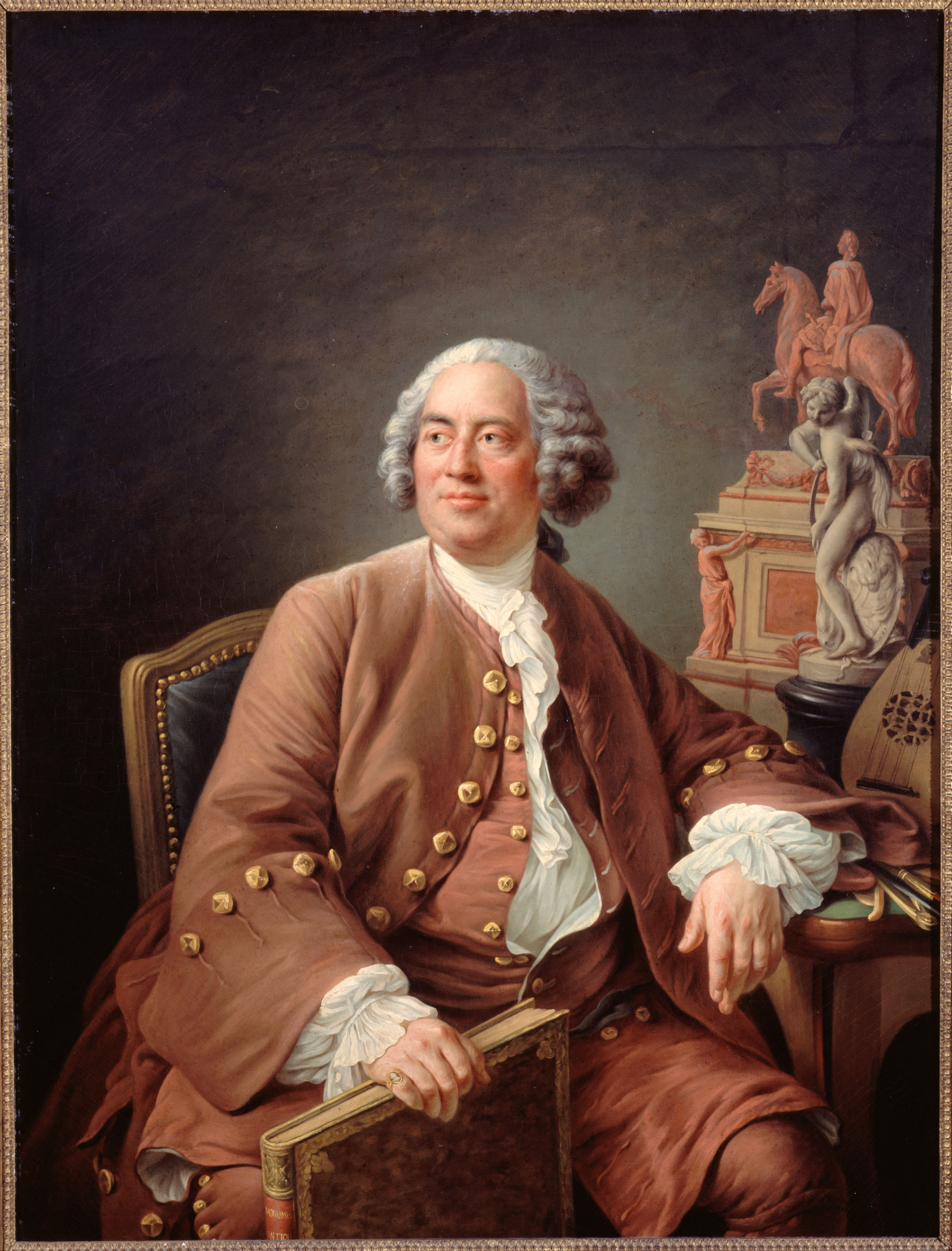
- Portrait by François-Hubert Drouais in 1758
- Born: Edme Bouchardon; 29 May 1698; Chaumont-en-Bassigny, France
- Died: 27 July 1762 (aged 64); Paris, France
- Known for: Sculpture
- Notable work: Fontaine des Quatre-Saisons

Edme Bouchardon (French: [ɛdme buʃaʁdɔ̃]; 29 May 1698 – 27 July 1762) was a French sculptor best known for his neoclassical statues in the gardens of the Palace of Versailles, his medals, his equestrian statue of Louis XV for the Place de la Concorde (destroyed during the French Revolution); and for the Fountain of Four Seasons in Paris. He was also a draftsman and painter, and made celebrated series of engravings of working-class Parisians.

== Biography ==
Bouchardon was born in Chaumont-en-Bassigny, the son of a sculptor and architect, Jean-Baptiste Bouchardon. He learned sculpture first in the studio of his father, and then with Guillaume Coustou. He won the Prix de Rome of the Académie royale de peinture et de sculpture in 1722, and as a consequence lived and worked in Rome from 1722 to 1732. He resisted the more ornate tendencies of the Rocaille style, and moved toward neoclassicism. While in Rome, he specialized in busts of distinguished patrons, including Pope Benedict XIII. In 1726 he also began a copy of the Barberini Faun, a Classical Hellenic sculpture from the Palazzo Barberini in Rome. His copy arrived in France in 1732, and was greatly admired, and aided the transition of French sculpture toward neoclassicism. In 1775 the Duke of Chartres bought it for his elaborate garden at Parc Monceau. It is now in the Louvre.

On his return to France, he was employed in the royal art workshops at the Palace of Versailles, working alongside his two brothers, he made statues for the gardens of Versailles, including the statue of Proteus in the Basin of Neptune. In his style, he resisted the flamboyant Rocaille style of his contemporaries, and tended toward more classical models. Bouchardon sculpted Cupid Fashioning a Bow out of the Club of Hercules, now in the Louvre, for the gardens of Versailles. It depicted a realistic, unidealized adolescent Cupid in a natural posture, which was completely in contrast with the classical ideals. He first presented the model in terra cotta at the 1739 Salon, then a full-scale model in 1746. He was commissioned to make a marble version, which he created between 1747 and 1750. The work established his reputation, and also his fortune; he was paid a remarkable 21,000 livres.

His last completed major sculptural work was the Fontaine des Quatre-Saisons on the Rue de Grenelle in Paris, commissioned in 1739, and completed six years later in 1745. This work featured a classical colonnade, decorated with statuary. It was similar in its arrangement of statues made by Michelangelo in the Sagrestia Nuova in Florence. His sculpture was widely admired. It was featured, along with a fine engraving of the fountain, in the article on classical sculpture by Jacques-François Blondel in the French Encyclopédie of 1765. However, it also drew considerable criticism, the colossal sculptural work on a narrow street provided only a tiny trickle of water. The project was criticized by Voltaire in a letter to Anne Claude de Caylus in 1739, as the fountain was still under construction:

I have no doubt that Bouchardon will make of this fountain a fine piece of architecture; but what kind of fountain has only two faucets where the water porters will come to fill their buckets? This isn't the way fountains are built in Rome to beautify the city. We need to lift ourselves out of taste that is gross and shabby. Fountains should be built in public places, and viewed from all the gates. There isn't a single public place in the vast faubourg Saint-Germain; that makes my blood boil. Paris is like the statue of Nabuchodonosor, partly made of gold and partly made of muck.

Bouchardon was commissioned to make one last major work, an equestrian statue of Louis XV for the Place Louis XV, to commemorate France's victory in the War of Austrian Succession. He died before the work was finished. It was completed by Jean-Baptiste Pigalle, but was destroyed during the French Revolution.

== Sculpture ==
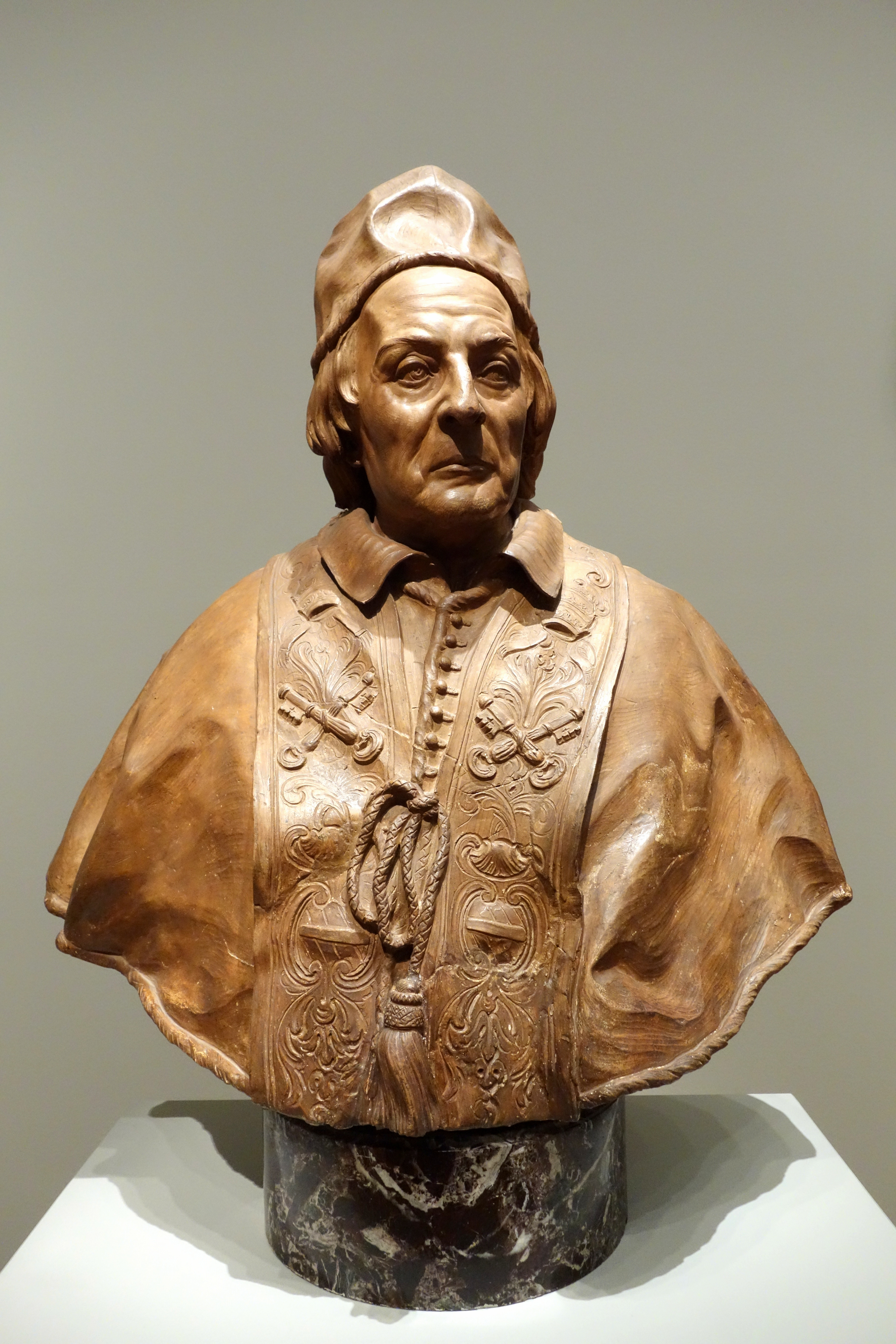
Bust of Pope Clement XII, plaster and terra-cotta (after 1730) California Palace of the Legion of Honor

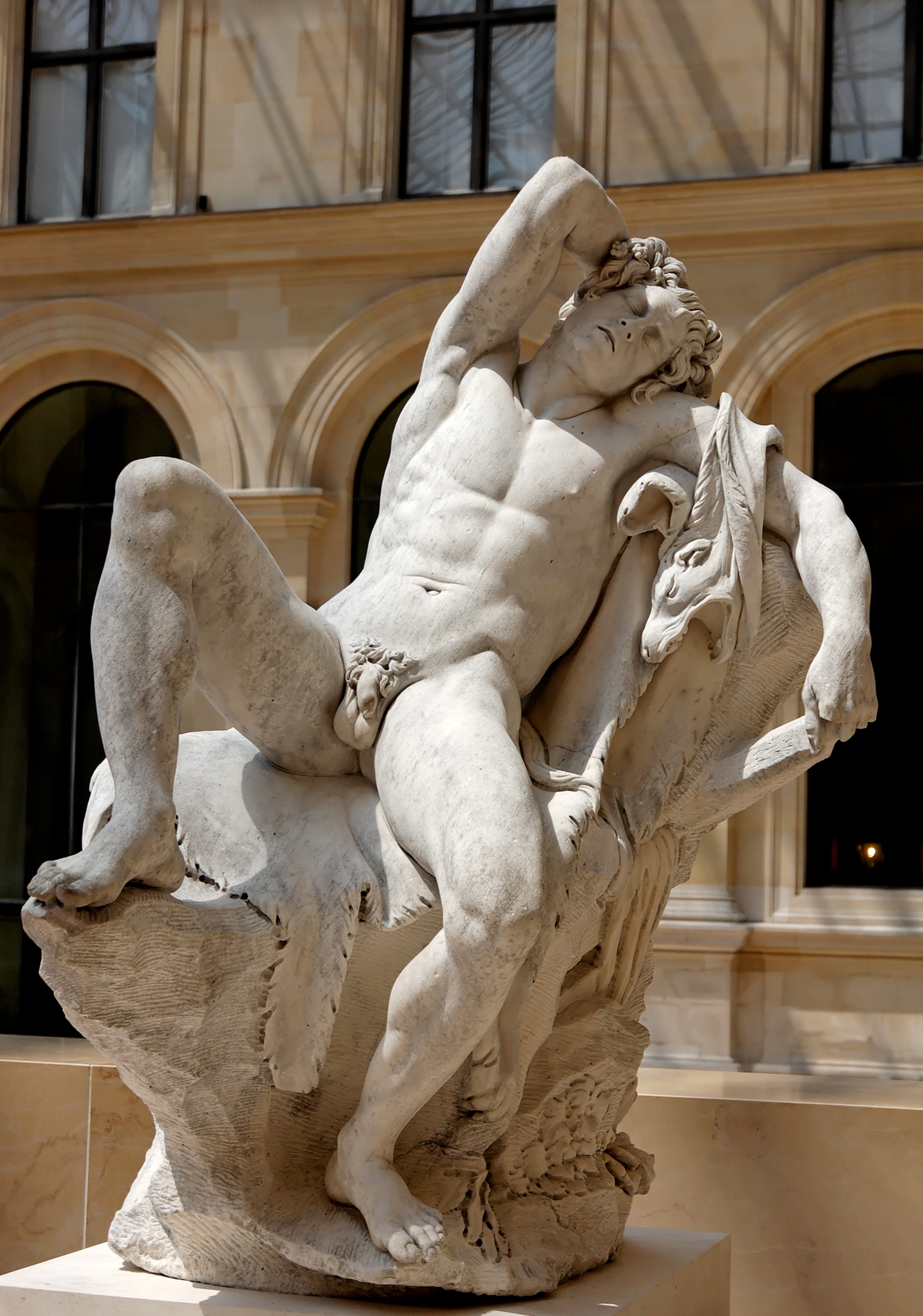
Copy of the Barberini Faun in Rome made by Bouchardon, Louvre (1732)

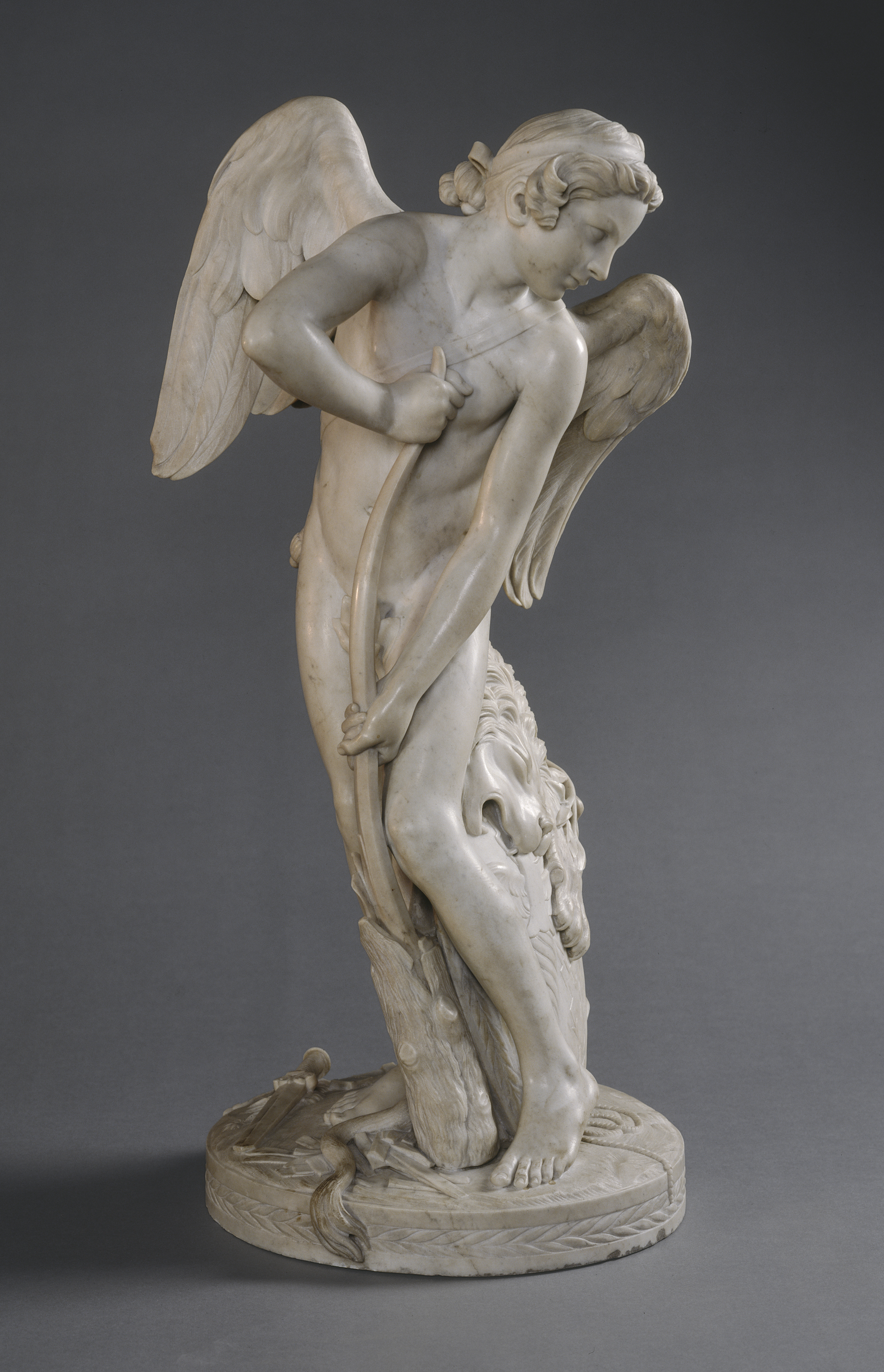
Edme Bouchardon, Cupid, 1744, National Gallery of Art

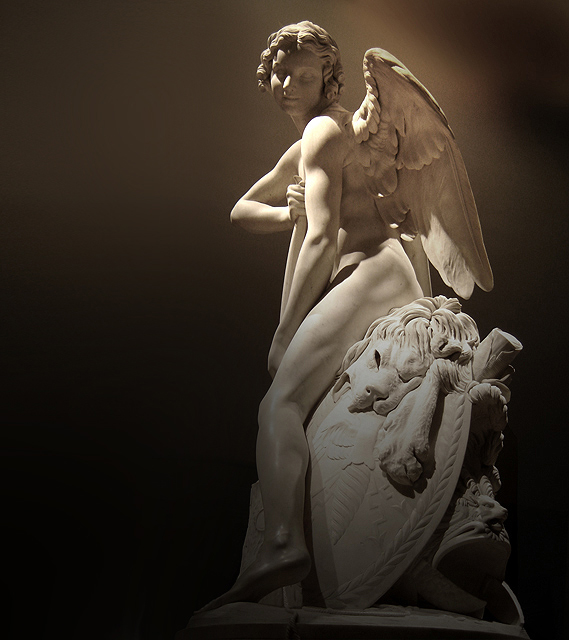
Amor Fashioning a Bow after the Club of Hercules, 1750, Louvre

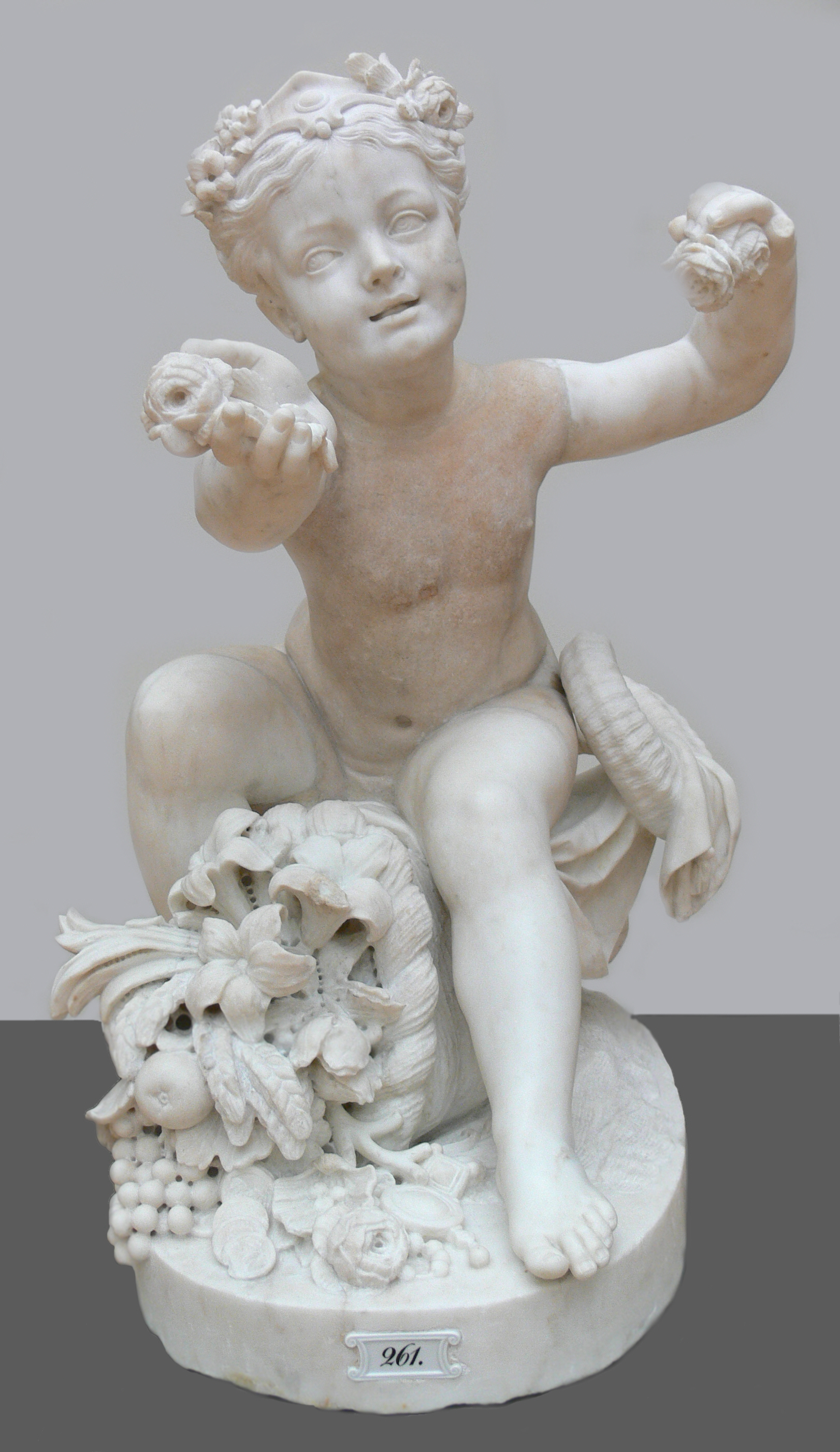
Genius of Abundance, 1731; Bode Museum

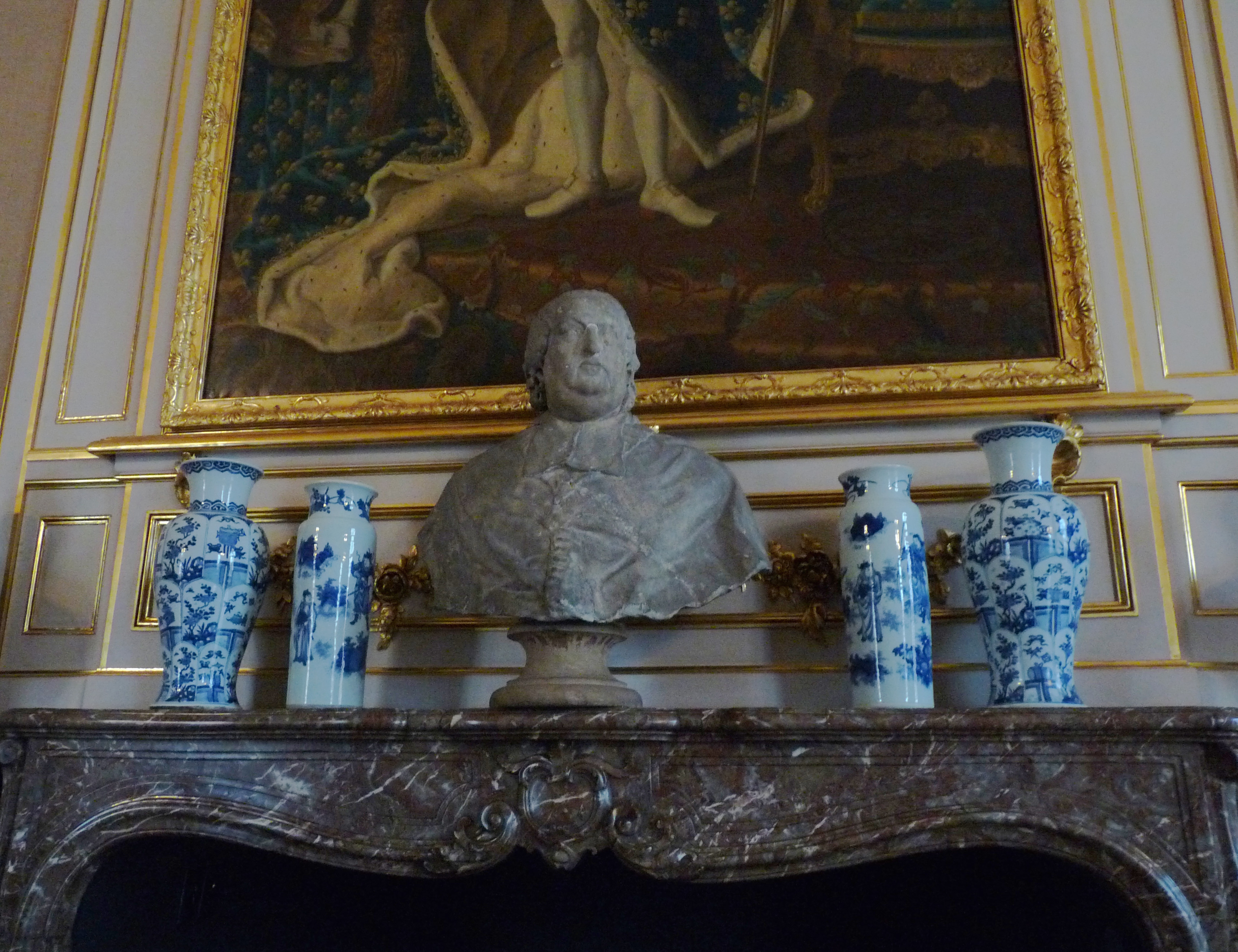
Armand Gaston Maximilien de Rohan, bust in the library of Palais Rohan, Strasbourg (after 1730)

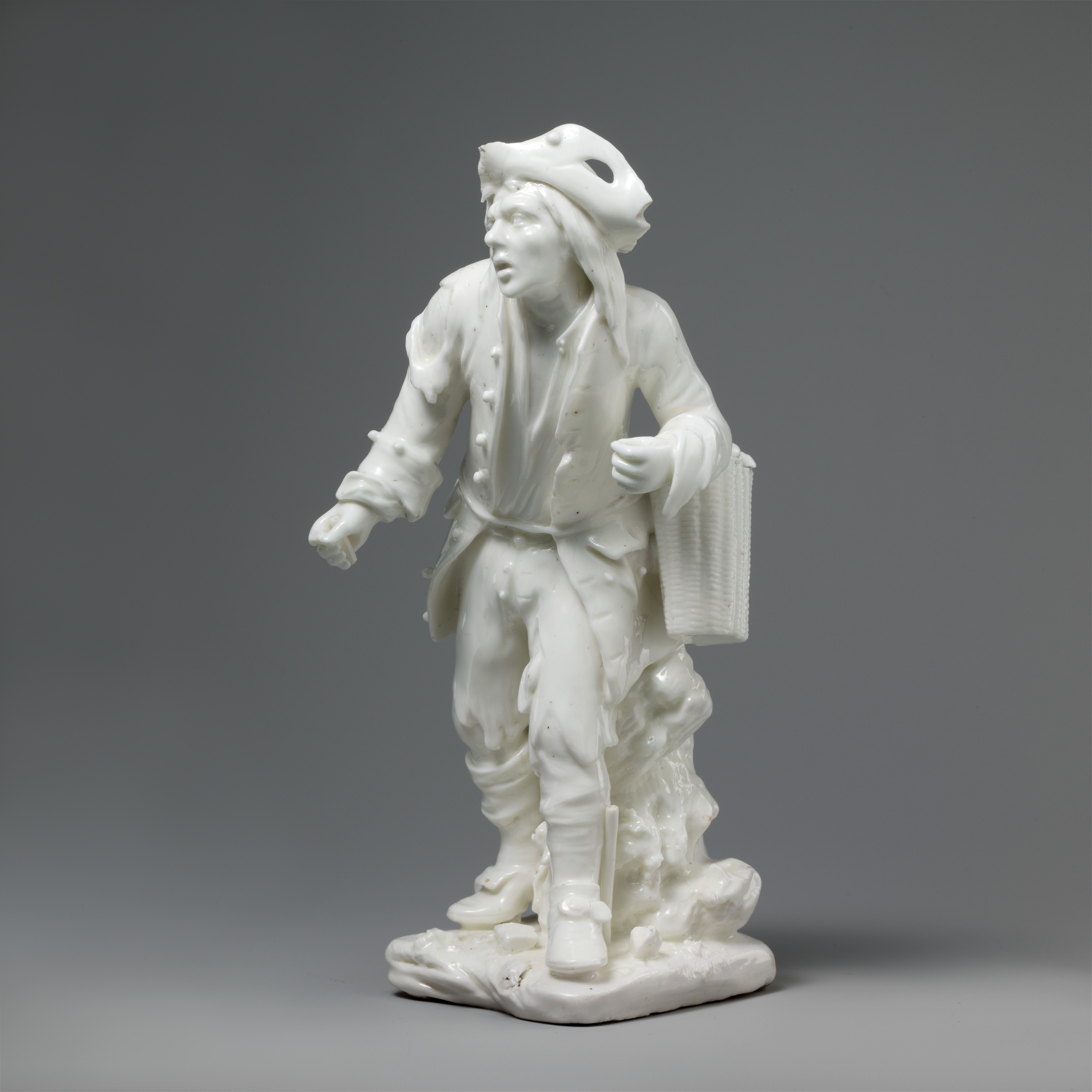
Porcelain figure of a street vendor (1750–60)

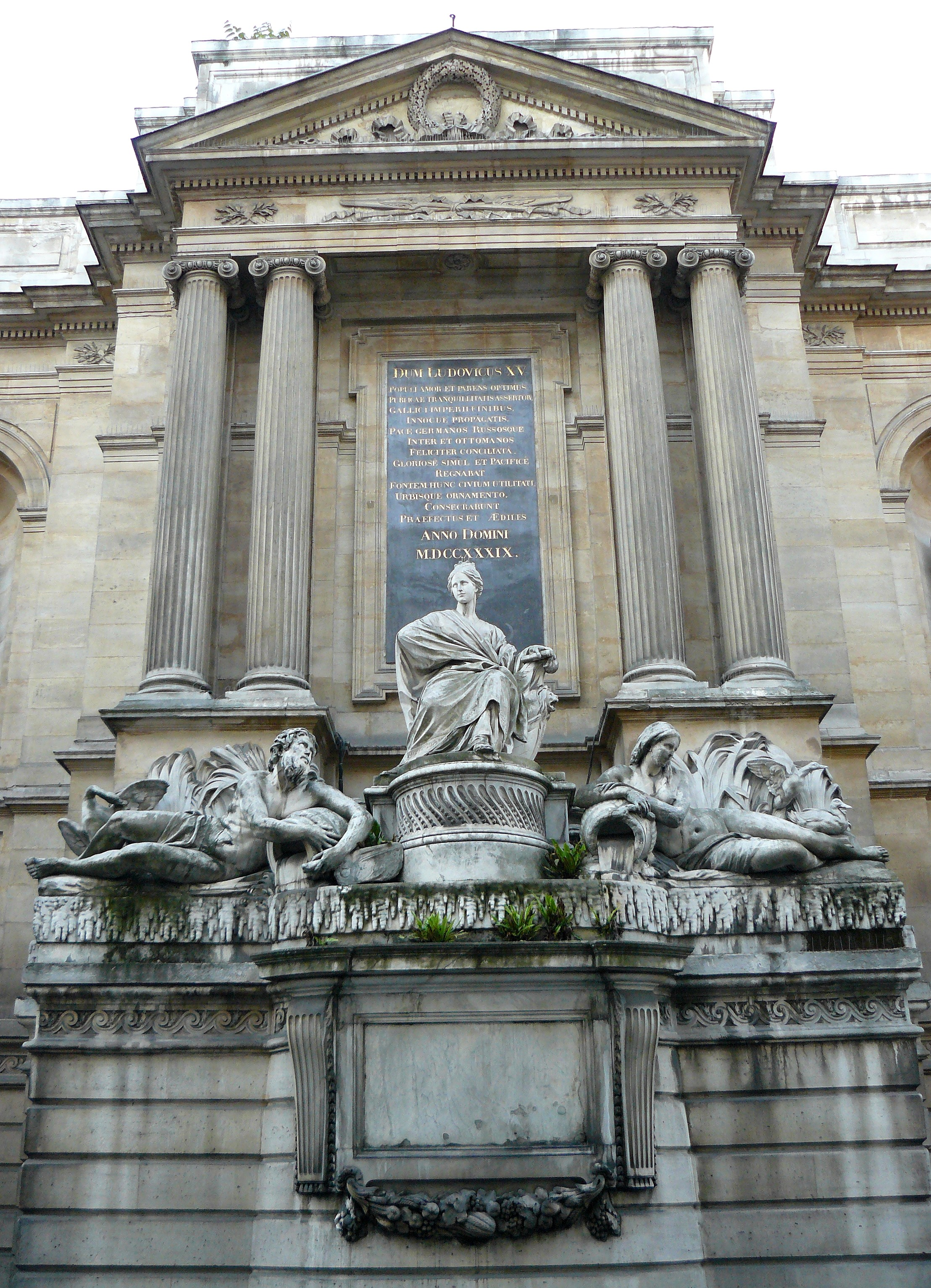
Fontaine des Quatre-Saisons, Paris (completed 1745)

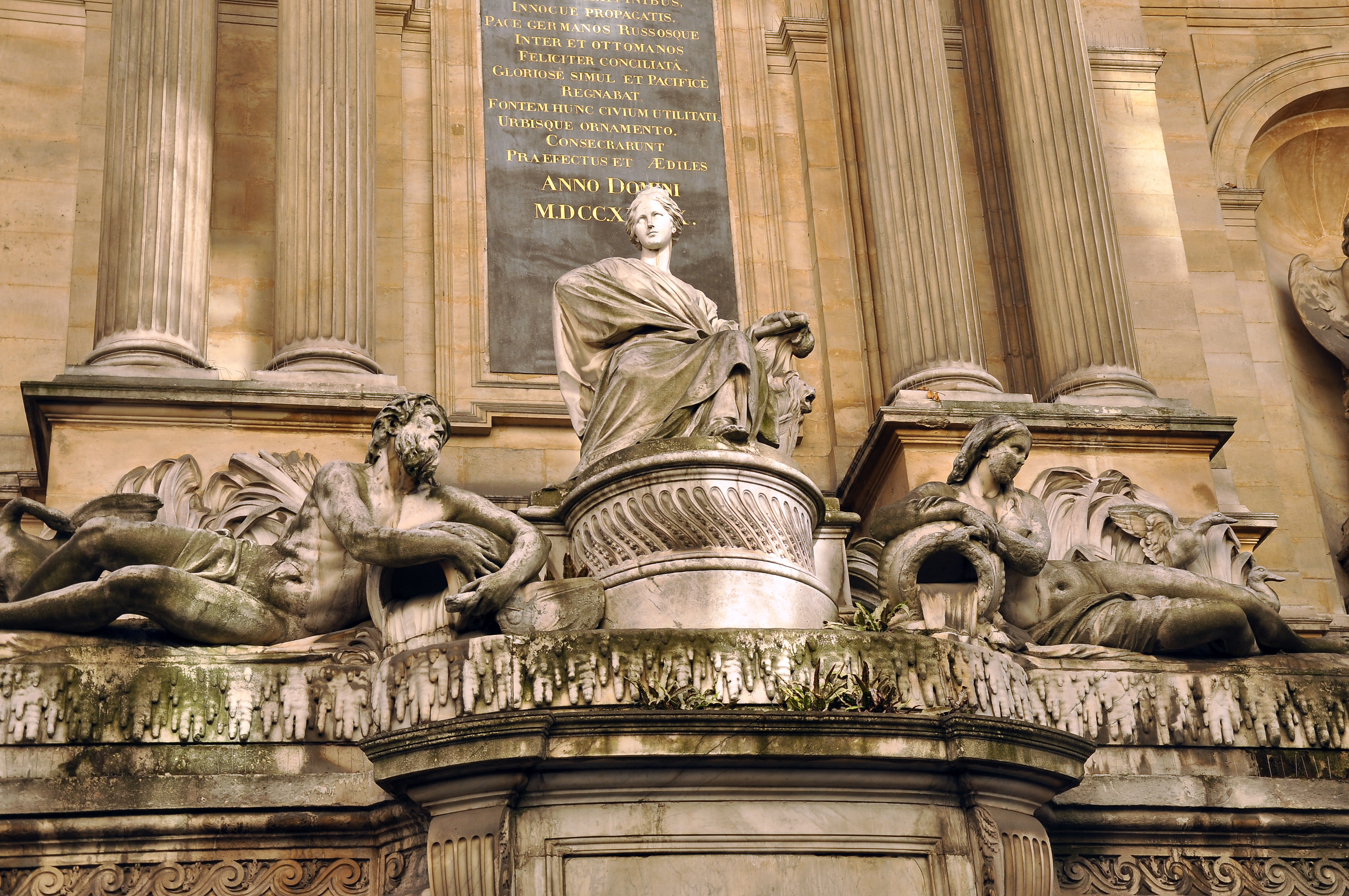
Central portion of the Fontaine des Quatre-Saisons (1745)

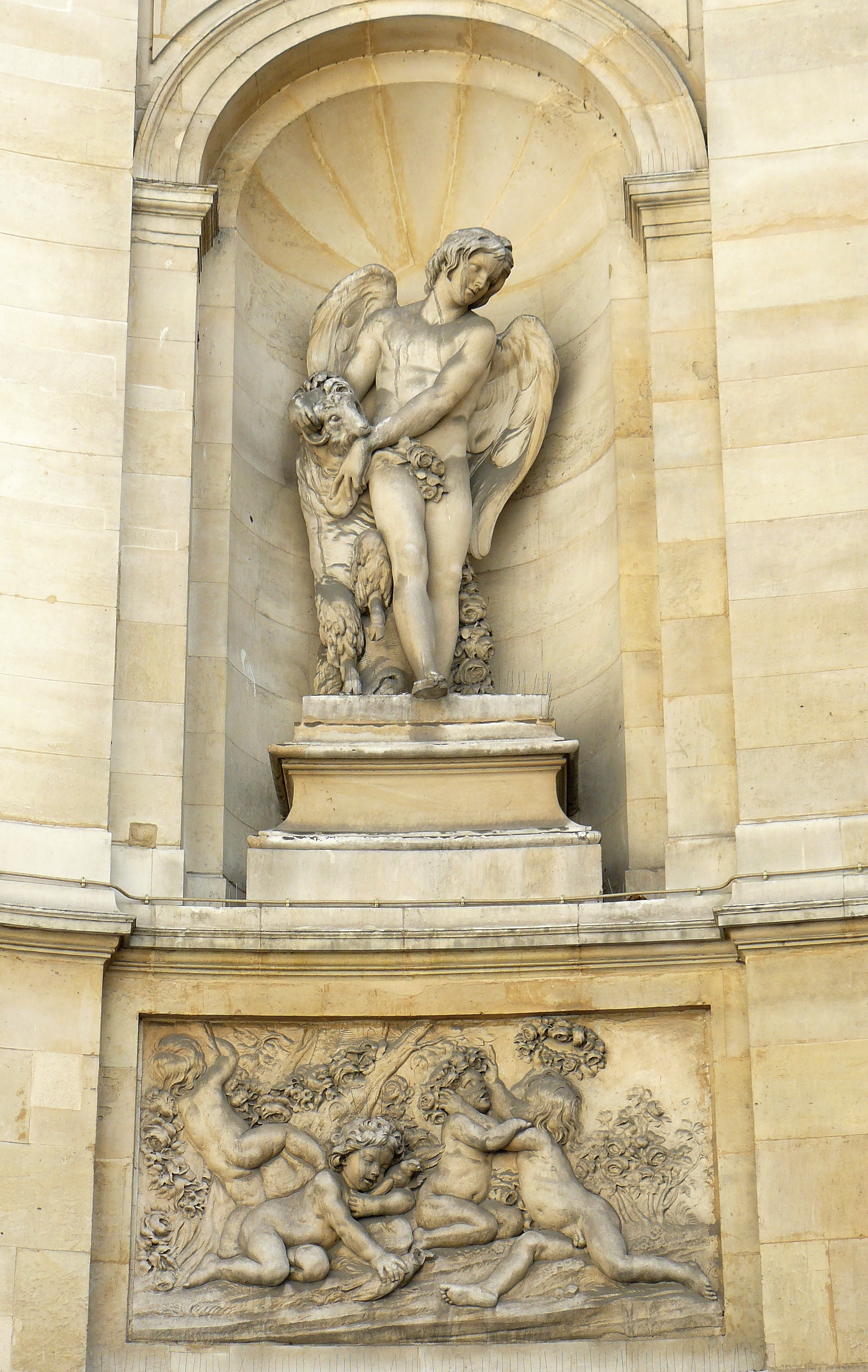
Detail of the Fontaine des Quatre-Saisons, Paris (completed 1745) (Spring)

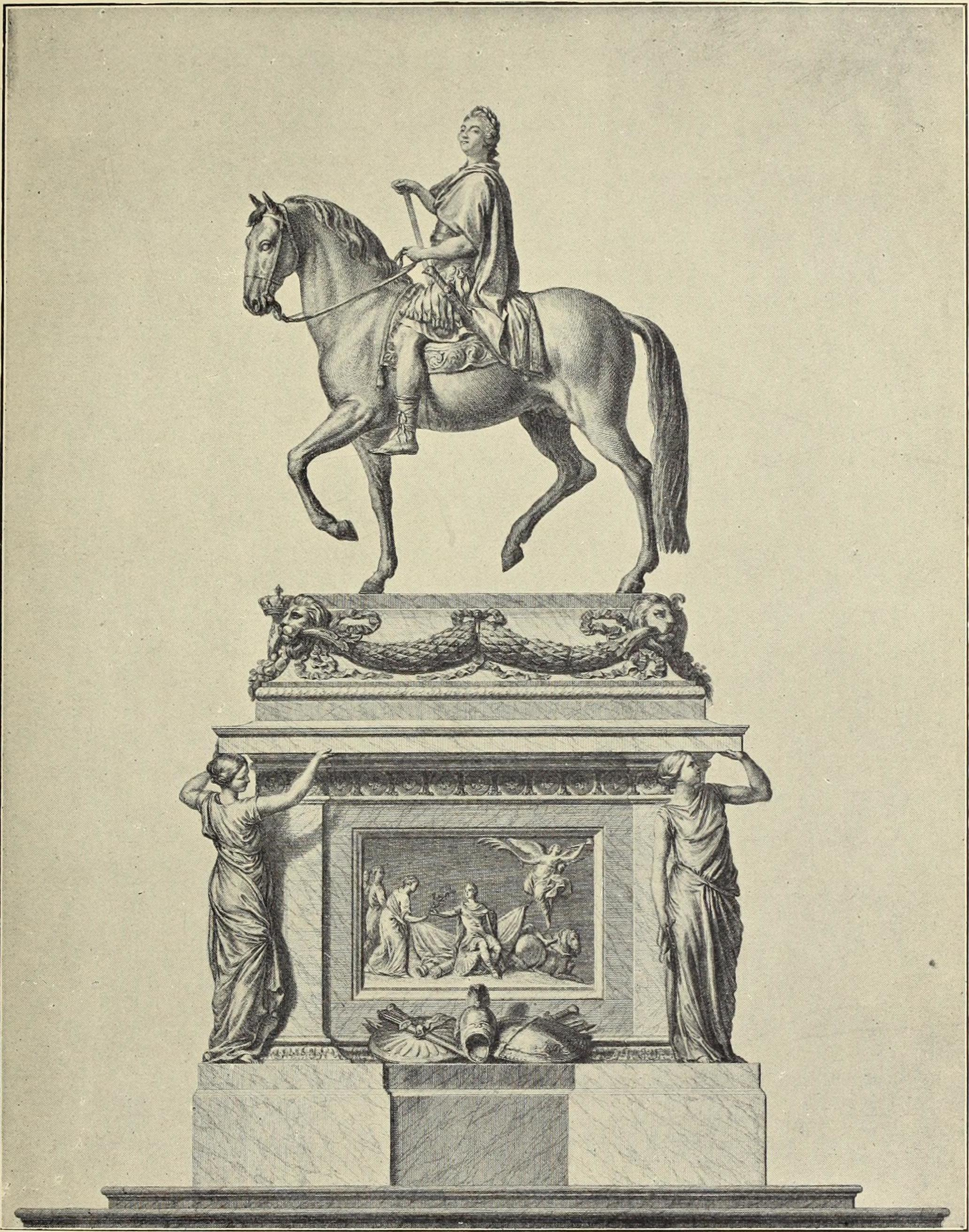
The finished equestrian statue of Louis XV for Place Louis XV, completed by Jean-Baptiste Pigalle (1762)

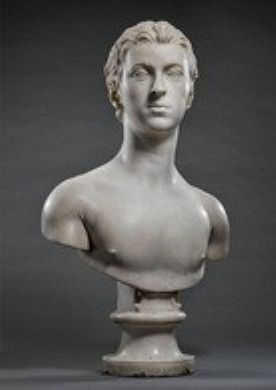
Bust of Sir John Gordon of Invergordon, held by Scotland's Highland Council (1728)

== Jetons ==
Bouchardon also designed jetons or metal tokens, which were distributed by the King. The subjects and themes were chosen by the Académie des Inscriptions et Belles-Lettres and passed through an elaborate process of critiques before approval, which involved the King himself. Drawings and counterproofs for these jetons are now held at various museums and collections around the world including the Institut de France, the Musée de la Monnaie, and the Bibliothèque nationale de France.

== Family ==
Bouchardon's brother, Jacques-Philippe Bouchardon, was also a sculptor, who became first sculptor to the king of Sweden.

== Drawings and etchings ==
Bouchardon was particularly skilled at drawing, and produced two series of drawings of working people in the streets of Paris. His drawings, made with sanguine or reddish chalk, were originally used to make a series of smaller ceramic sculptures of Parisian characters, such as street vendors (see gallery). Later they were made into a series of etchings by the historian and engraver Anne Claude de Caylus, under the title Studies made of the Lower Class or the Cries of Paris. These became a very valuable source of information for later social historians.

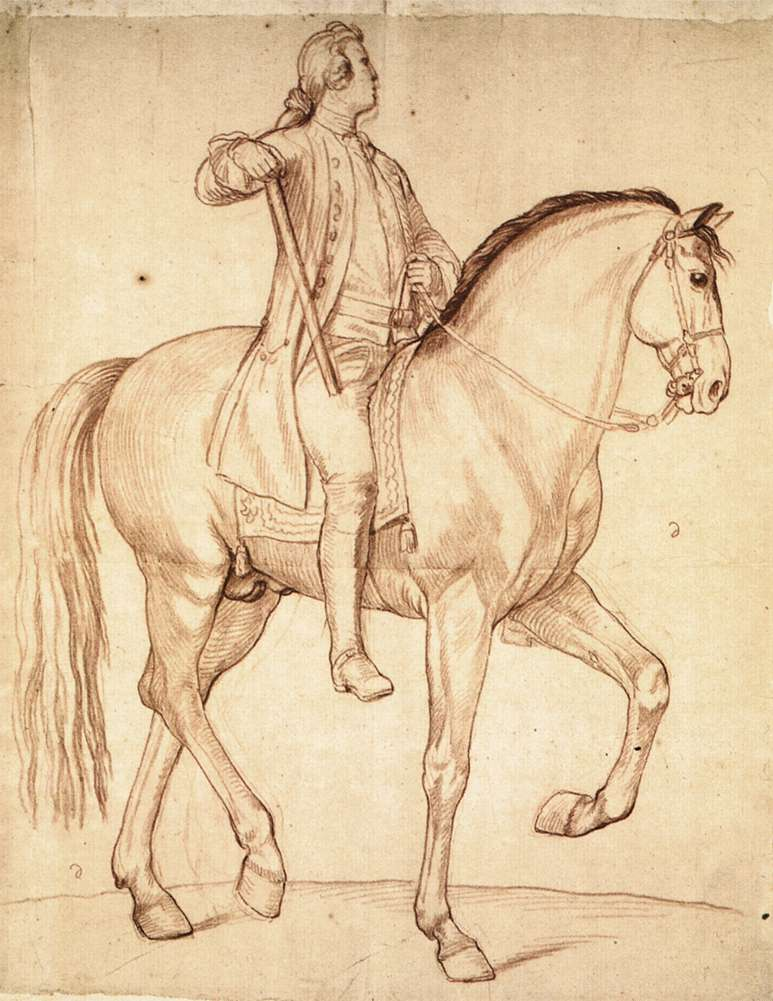
Study for the Equestrian Statue of Louis XV, c. 1750, Louvre

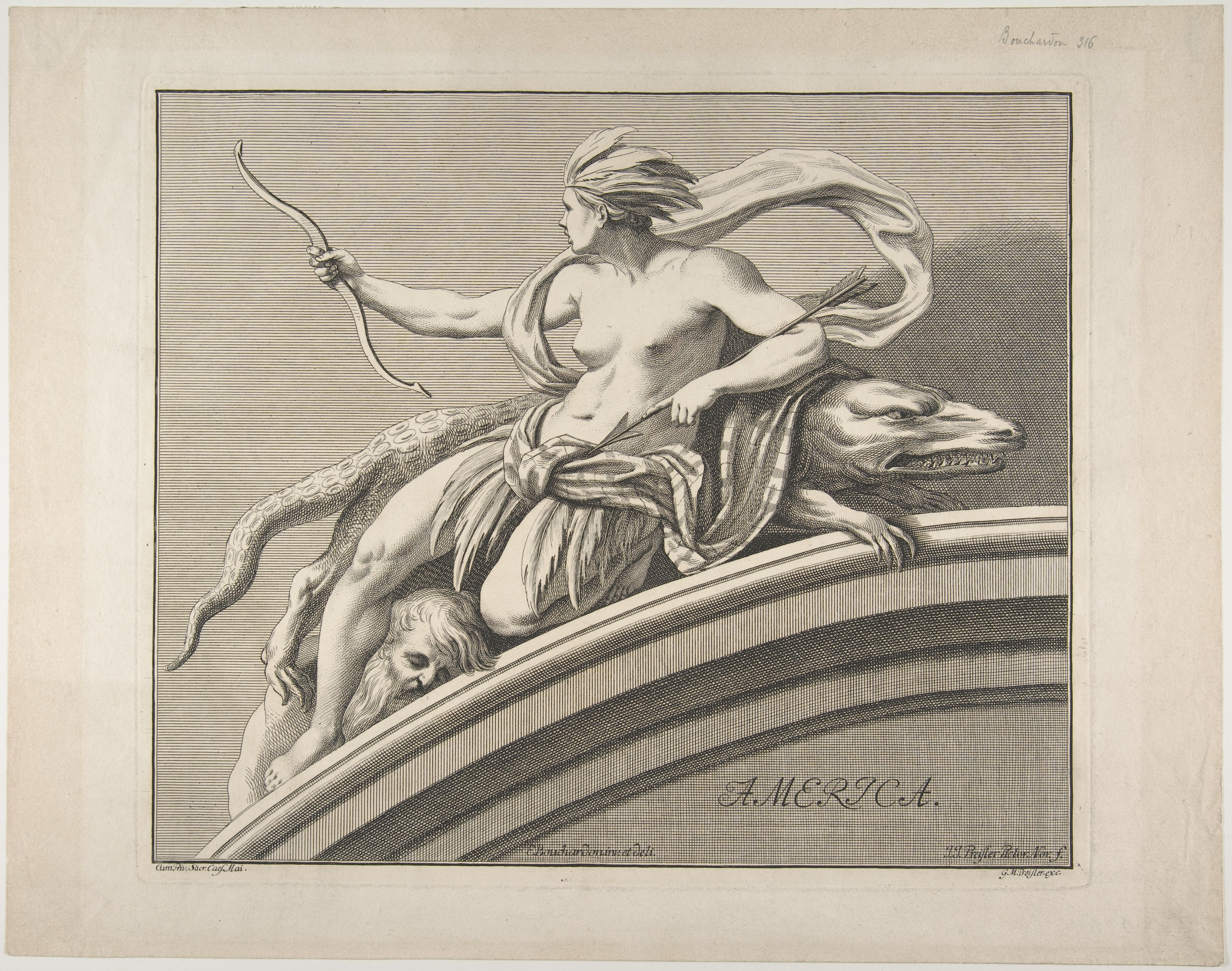
Print of the continent America after a drawing by Bouchardon for a sculptural design, (Metropolitan Museum of Art

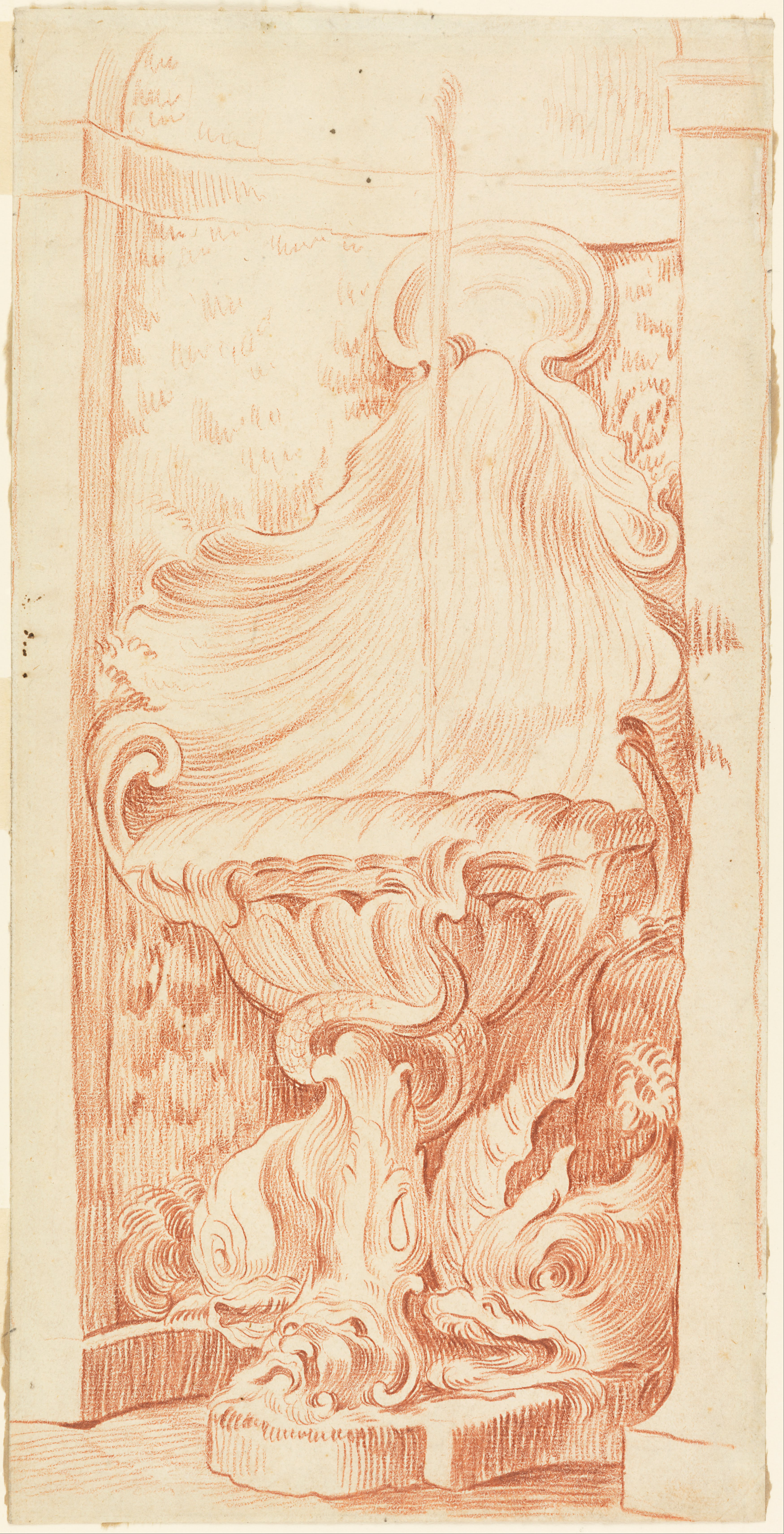
Design for Fountain in Niche, c. 1735, Cooper–Hewitt, National Design Museum

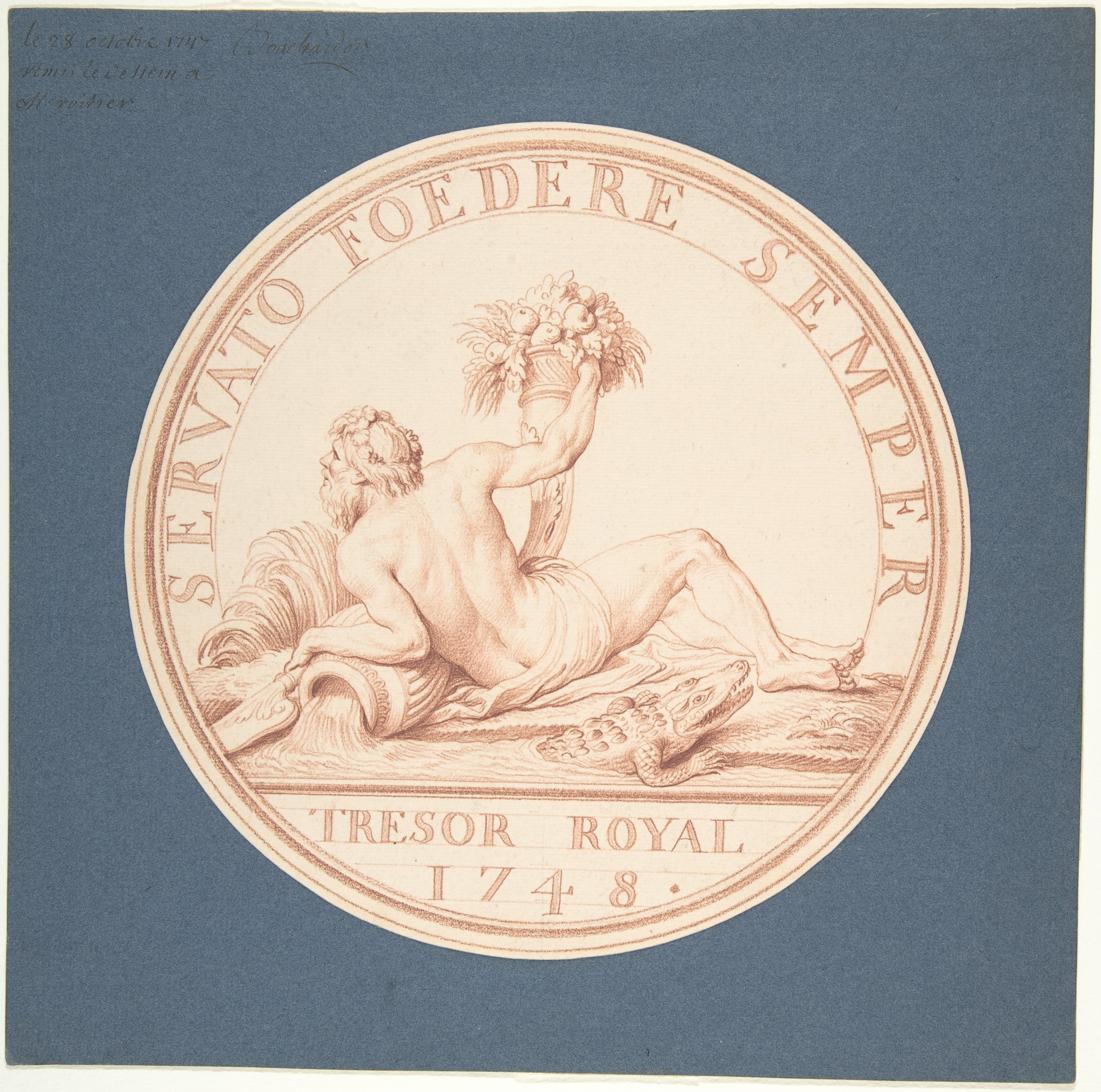
Design for a royal jeton, or commemorative token (1748)

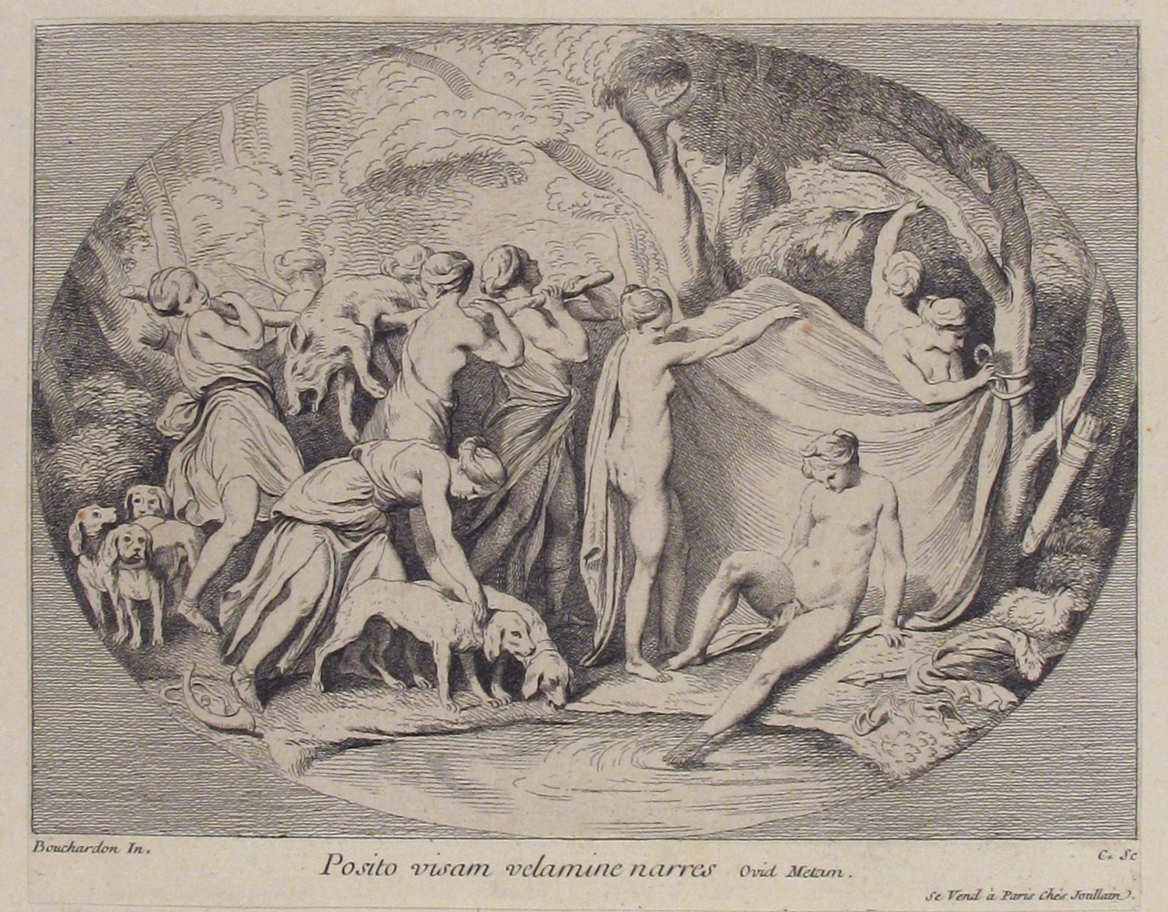
Diana at the Bath after Returning from the Hunt (1730–60), Metropolitan Museum of Art

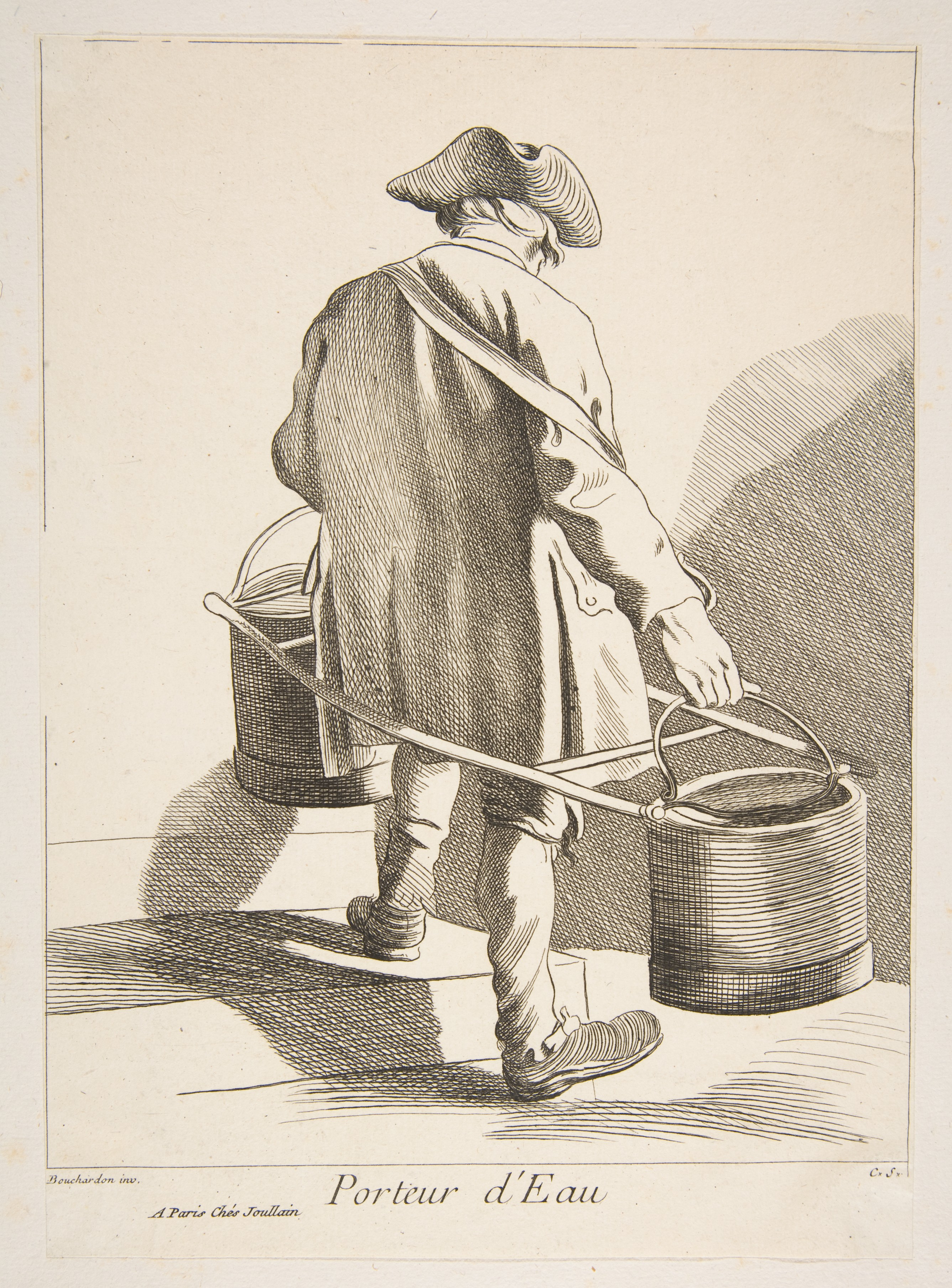
A water carrier (1742), Metropolitan Museum of Art

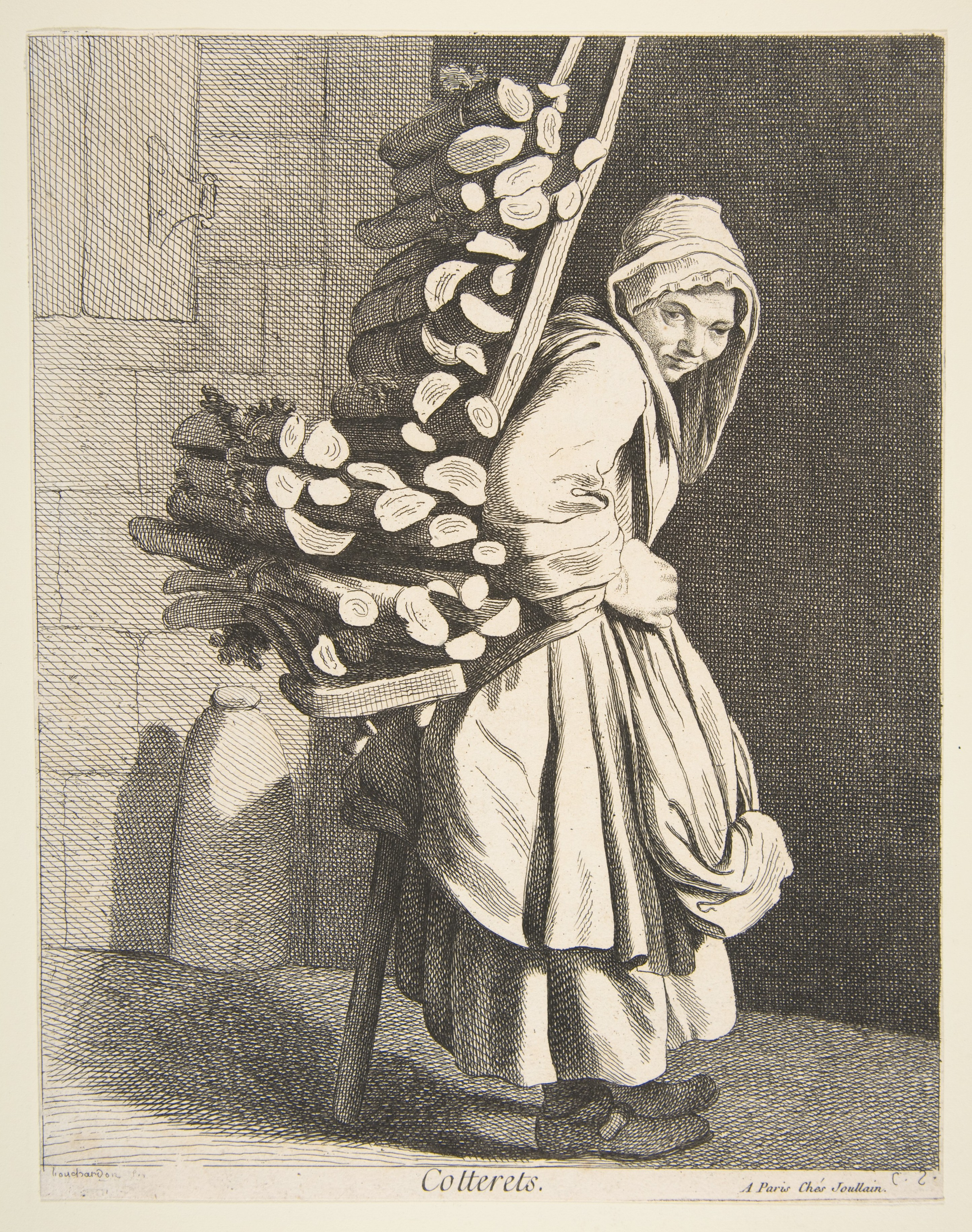
A firewood seller in Paris (1748), Metropolitan Museum of Art

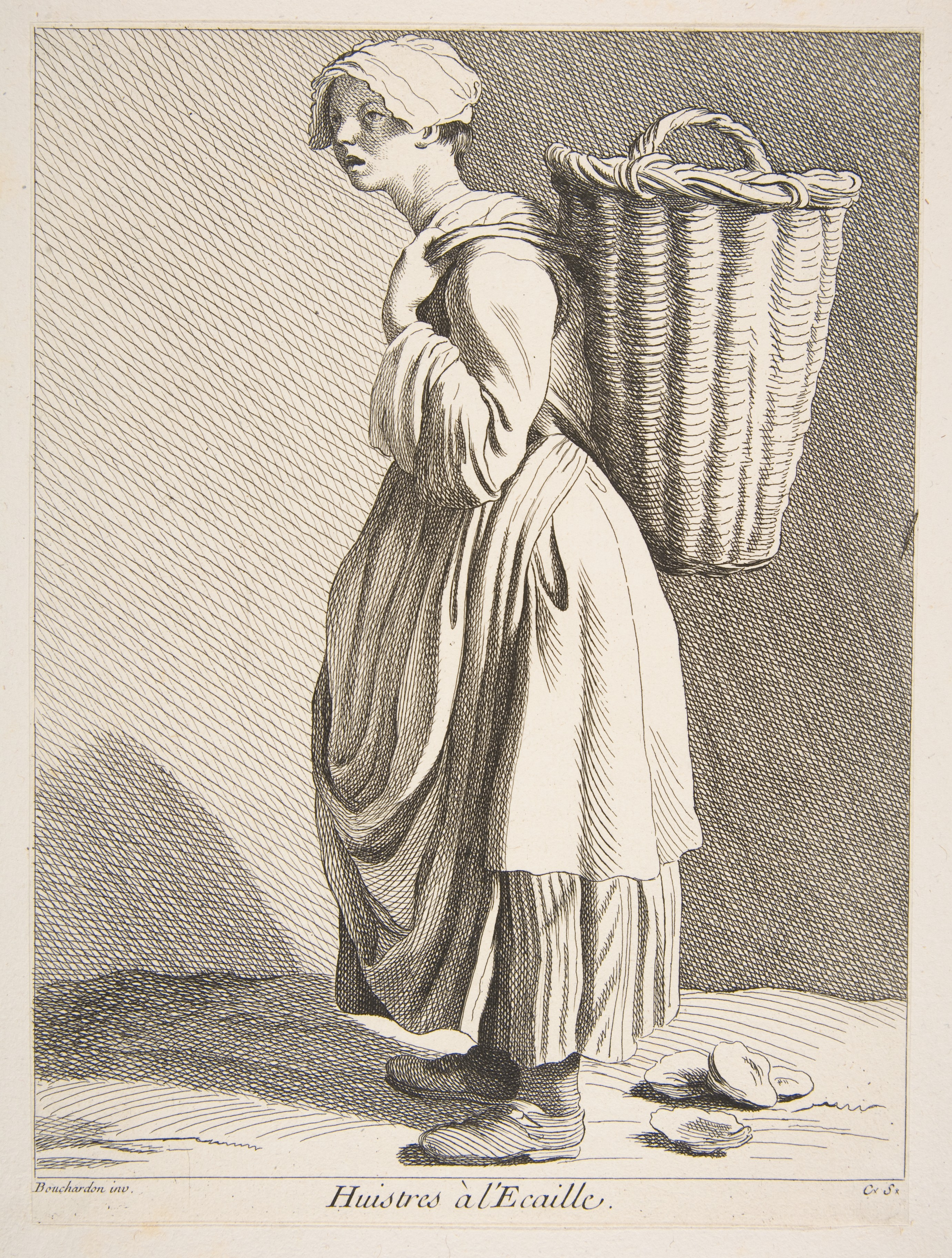
Oyster seller in Paris (1738), Metropolitan Museum of Art

== See also ==
- Bust of Sir John Gordon

== Bibliography ==
- Gerhard Bissell, Bouchardon, Edme, in: Allgemeines Künstlerlexikon (Artists of the World), Vol. 13, Saur, Munich 1996, from p. 425 (in German).
- Duby, Georges and Daval, Jean-Luc, La Sculpture de l'Antiquité au XXe Siècle, (French translation from German), Taschen, (2013), (ISBN 978-3-8365-4483-2)
- Geese, Uwe, Section on Baroque sculpture in L'Art Baroque – Architecture – Sculpture – Peinture (French translation from German), H.F. Ulmann, Cologne, 2015. (ISBN 978-3-8480-0856-8)
