= Counterproof =

In printmaking, a counterproof is a print taken off from another just printed, which, by being passed through the press, gives a copy in reverse, and of course in the same position as that of the plate from which the first was printed, the object being to enable the printmaker to inspect the state of the plate.

Counterproofing was used to produce the finest quality copperplate printing; the second print consisted of delicate lines, and lacked the beveled impressions seen in the original print.

To counter-prove is also to pass a drawn design in black lead or red chalk through the press, after having moistened with a sponge both that and the paper on which the counterproof is to be taken.
