= Fontaine des Quatre-Saisons =

Fountain in Paris, France

Coordinates: 48°51′16.85″N 02°19′30.40″E

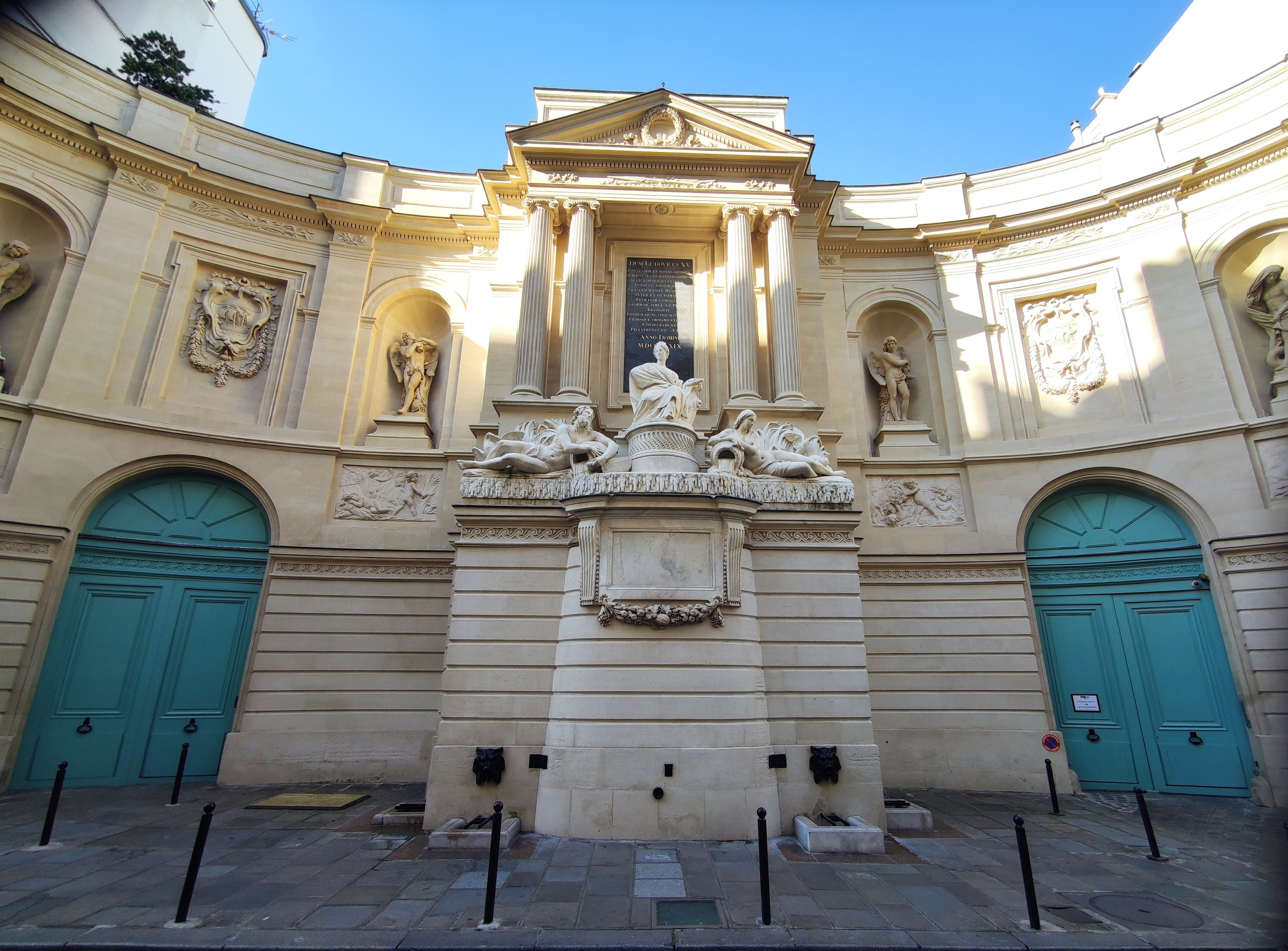
The Fontaine des Quatre-Saisons (2025)

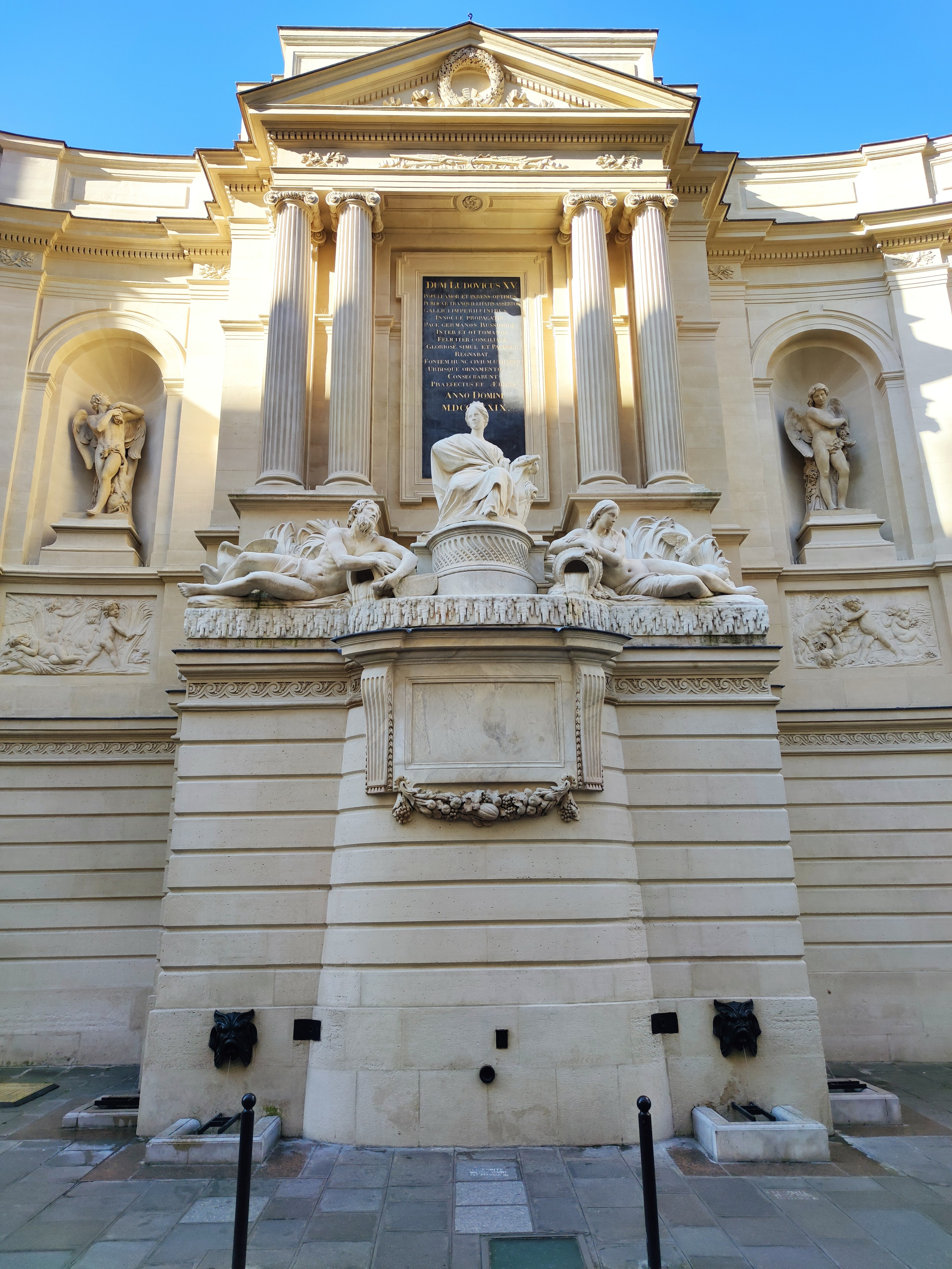
Central part of the fountain

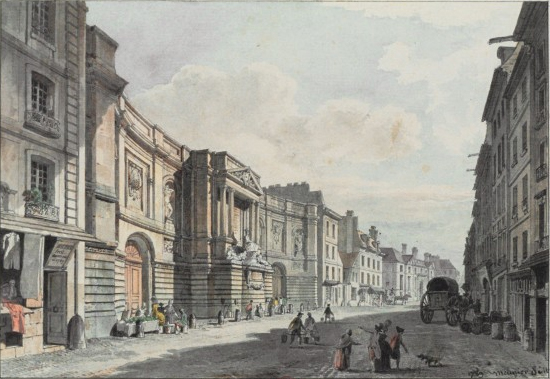
The fountain as it appeared in 1789

The Fontaine des Quatre-Saisons (French for 'Fountain of the Four Seasons') is a monumental 18th-century public fountain, at 57-59 rue de Grenelle in the 7th arrondissement of Paris, France. It was executed by Edme Bouchardon, royal sculptor of King Louis XV (ruled 1715–1774), and opened in 1745. The fountain is huge and richly decorated, but it had only two water spouts, and its grand scale on the narrow street, together with the lack of water, irritated Voltaire and other figures of the French Enlightenment.

== History ==
The Fontaine des Quatre-Saisons was the largest and most ornate of the thirty fountains built in Paris in the 18th century to provide drinking water to the city's residents. Between 1715 and 1724, the Conseil d'Etat of King Louis XV began discussing the idea of a new fountain in the Faubourg Saint-Germain area, which was rapidly growing. They first discussed placing it at the corner of rue du Bac and the rue de l'Université, then rue Saint-Dominique, and finally decided on it current site on rue de Grenelle, on a parcel of land owned by the convent of Récollettes. The project was approved by the Prevot des Marchands, the leader of the city's businessmen, Michel-Étienne Turgot, who shared authority for all fountains and water projects in Paris, and was given in 1739 to the Royal sculptor, Edme Bouchardon, for completion. Bouchardon worked for seven years on the project. He displayed the plaster models for the central group of sculptures at the Salon du Louvre in 1740, and the bas-reliefs in 1741. The fountain was not completely finished until 1745.

The fountain had a double purpose: to provide water to Parisians, and to advertise the benevolence of King Louis XV to the people of Paris. The King's principal minister and political counselor, the Cardinal de Fleury, personally wrote the inscription which was placed on the facade of the fountain, in Latin, in gold letters engraved in black marble:

Whereas Louis XV, the object of the love of his people and excellent father, the support of public tranquility, after having recovered, without the flow of blood, the frontiers of the Kingdom of France, and since peace has been happily restored between the Germans and the Russians and the Subjects of the Ottoman Empire, ruling in a manner both glorious and peaceful; the Prevot des marchands and the ediles (town counselors) have devoted this fountain to the service of the citizens and to the beautification of the city in the course of the year 1739.

While the fountain had an abundance of statuary, it did not produce very much water. Only one aqueduct brought water to the Left Bank at the time, the aqueduct de Arcueil, which brought water to the left bank from Rungis. The water flowed to the Fontaine Saint-Michel, then by a secondary pipe to the Fontaine des Quatre-Saisons. The water was stored in the upper part of the fountain, and flowed by gravity down to two spouts in form of lion's heads, from which water flowed continually. The water was collected in vessels by local residents, or by water porters (porteurs d'eau) who carried the water to other parts of the quarter and sold it to the inhabitants.

After the fountain was built, there were many calls for it to be moved to a large square where it would be more visible and proportional to its surroundings, but, given the many reconstructions of Paris squares in the 19th and 20th century, it probably survived intact only because of its obscure location.

== Decoration ==
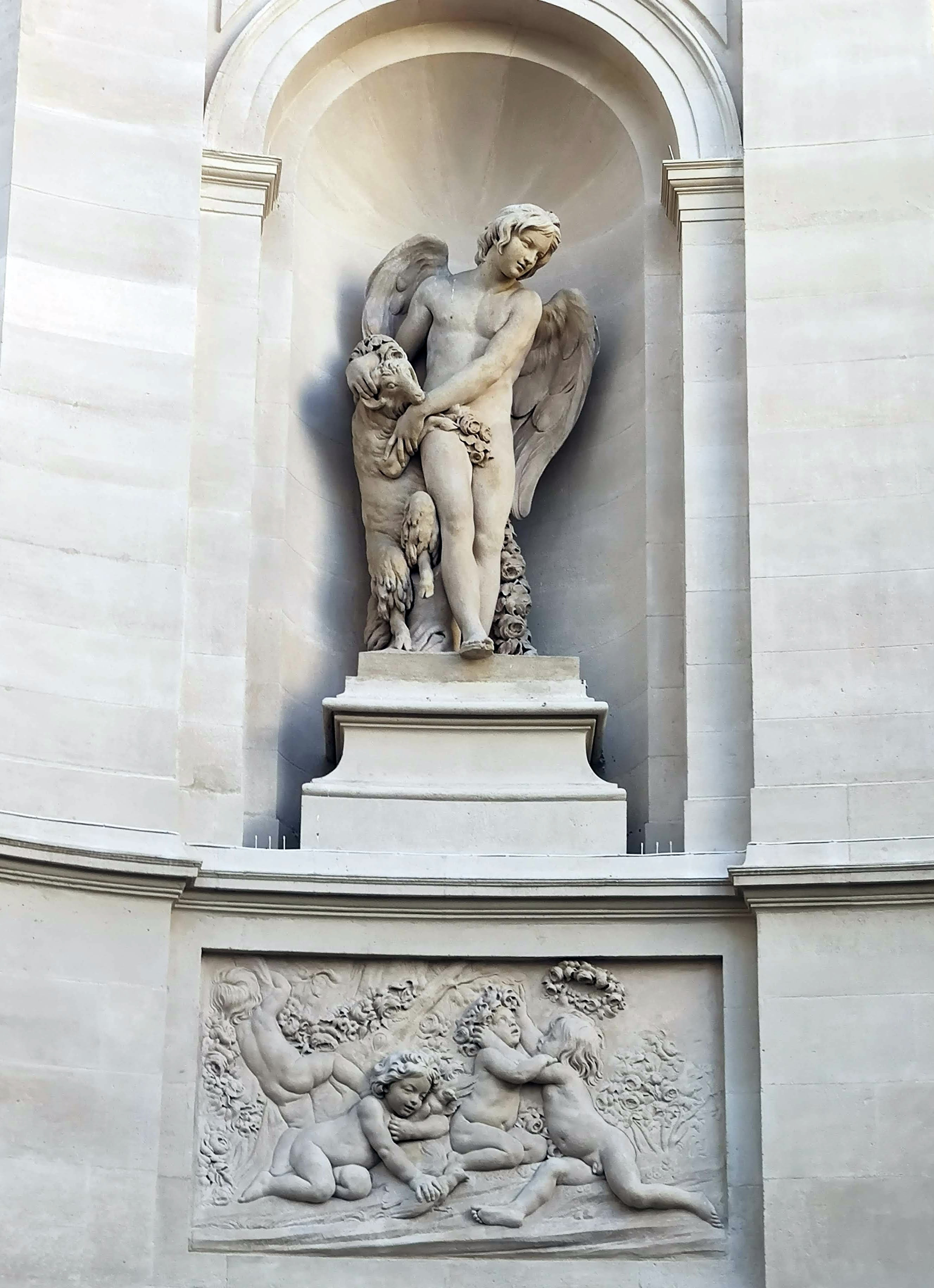
Bas-relief of Spring

The decorative figures of the fountain were described by Bouchardon himself in his proposal:

The principal figure occupying the center represents the City of Paris, in the form of a woman seated on a throne placed on a circular base. She is richly dressed, and her attitude is inspired by her majesty. She holds the prow of a vessel in one hand, on which she is resting; her other arm is back, resting on her side, and on her head she wears a crown.

On either side of the central figure are two other figures, reclining. The figure to the right represents the River Seine, who is looking at the City of Paris with a satisfaction mixed with surprise. On the other side is a representation of the River Marne, occupied by her care to spread her good works in the city, to procure abundance and to make commerce flourish.

These three figures, which will be 7 feet (2.1 m), will be executed in marble, as will be the roseaux in bas-relief which will serve as their background, and the different attributes that they characterize.

The rest of the sculptures, which only consist of ornaments, will be made in stone of lias or another hard stone, whichever is judged most appropriate, with the exception of the two mascarons [faucets] which jet the water of the fountain, which will be of bronze.

The decoration of the two wings of the building consisted of four niches with bas-relief figures representing "Les Genies des Seasons" (The spirit of the seasons): "by young people with wings carrying the fruits which appear in each season. The intention of this is to show that the abundance which reigns in Paris does not suffer any interruption during the course of the year.

There remain the empty spaces below the niches. There will be bas-reliefs which express the games of children which accompany the subject represented in the statue which they accompany.

== Critical reaction ==
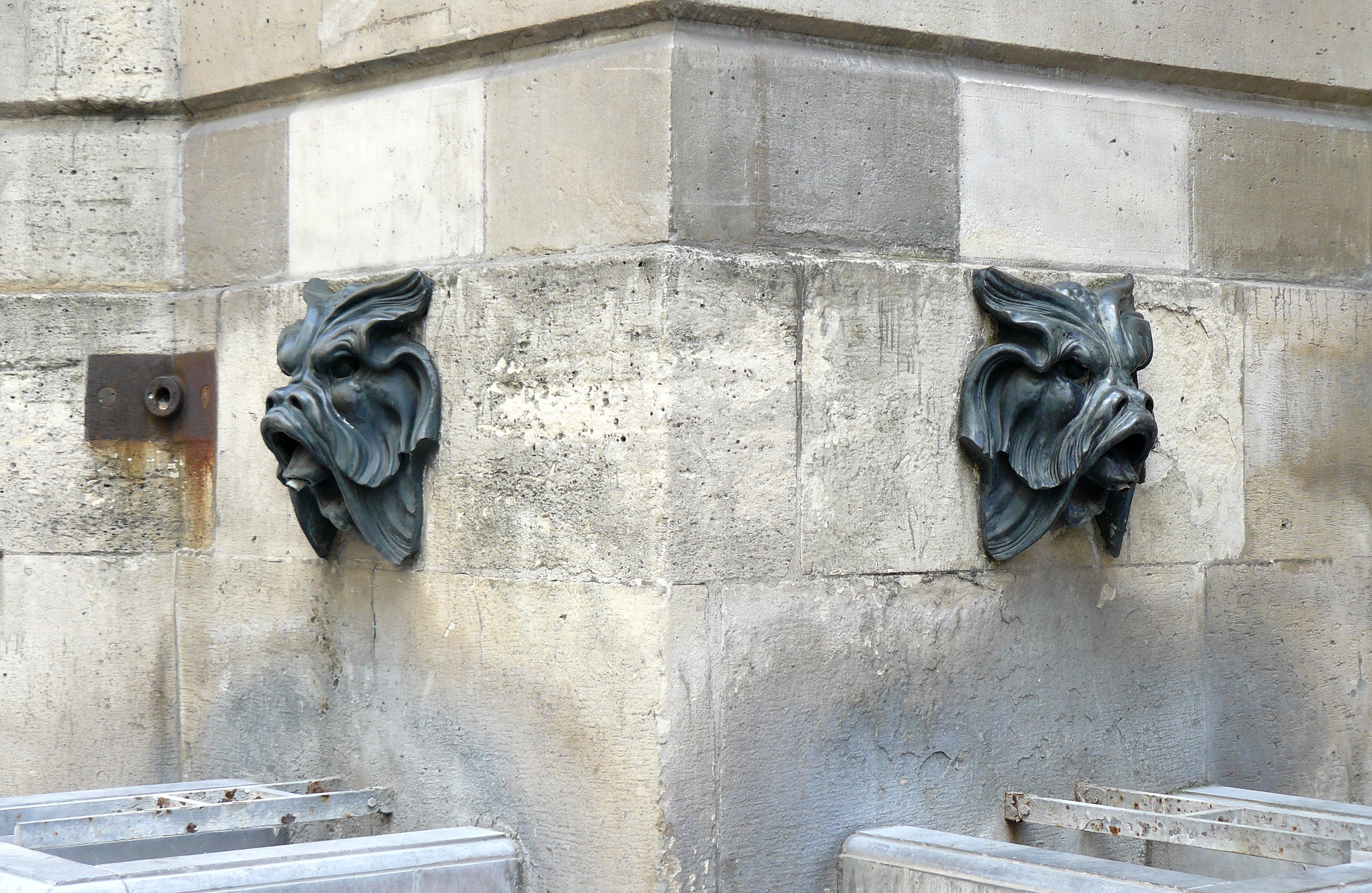
Two mascarons, or spouts, for filling vessels of water

The sculpture by Bouchardon was widely praised at the time. It was featured, along with a fine engraving of the fountain, in the article on classical sculpture by J. F. Blondel in the French Encyclopedia of 1765.

The project, however, and its massive scale on the narrow street, was criticized by Voltaire in a letter to the Count de Caylus in 1739, as the fountain was still under construction:

I have no doubt that Bouchardon will make of this fountain a fine piece of architecture; but what kind of fountain has only two faucets where the water porters will come to fill their buckets? This isn't the way fountains are built in Rome to beautify the city. We need to lift ourselves out of taste that is gross and shabby. Fountains should be built in public places, and viewed from all the gates. There isn't a single public place in the vast faubourg Saint-Germain; that makes my blood boil. Paris is like the statue of Nabuchodonosor, partly made of gold and partly made of muck.

== Gallery ==
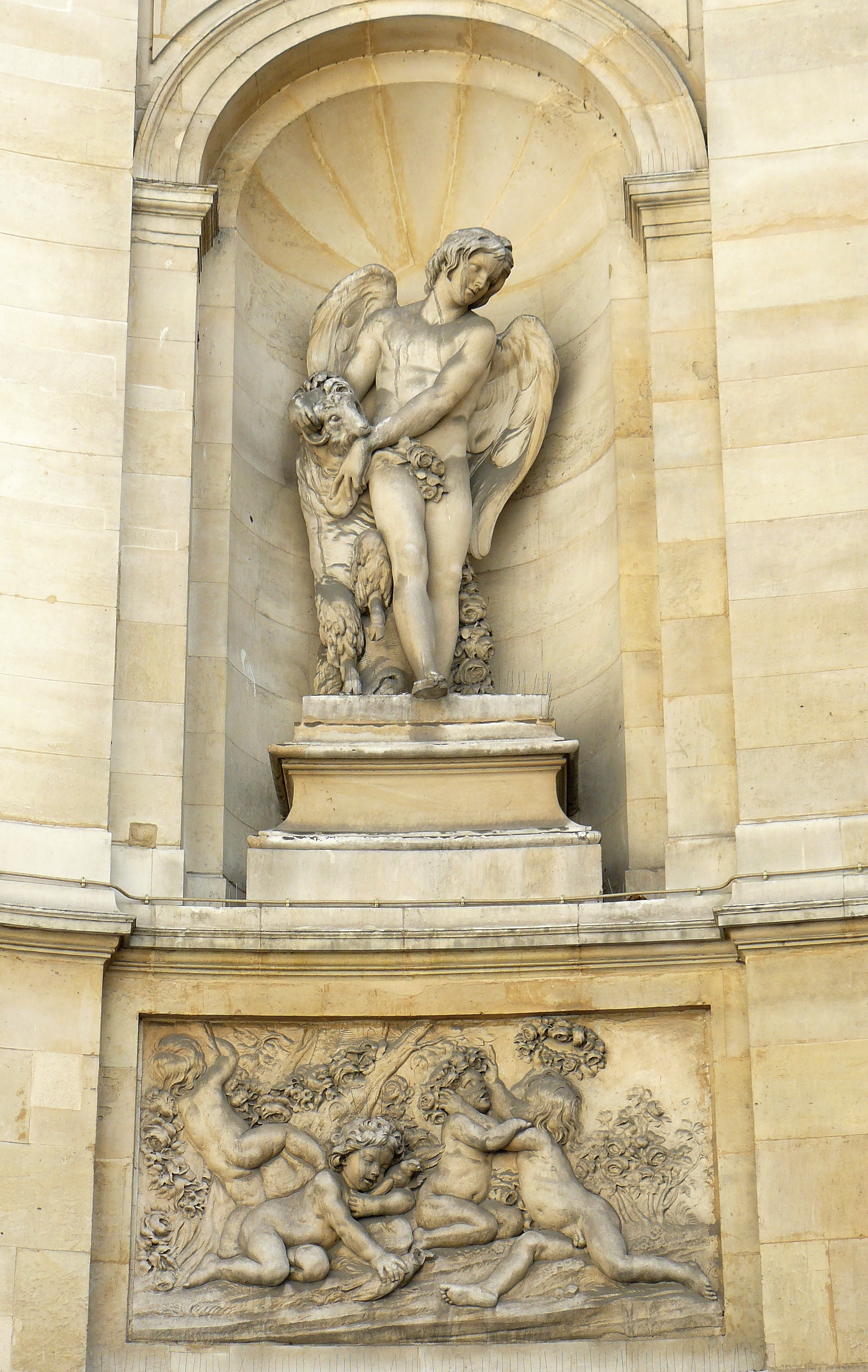
Bas-relief of Spring

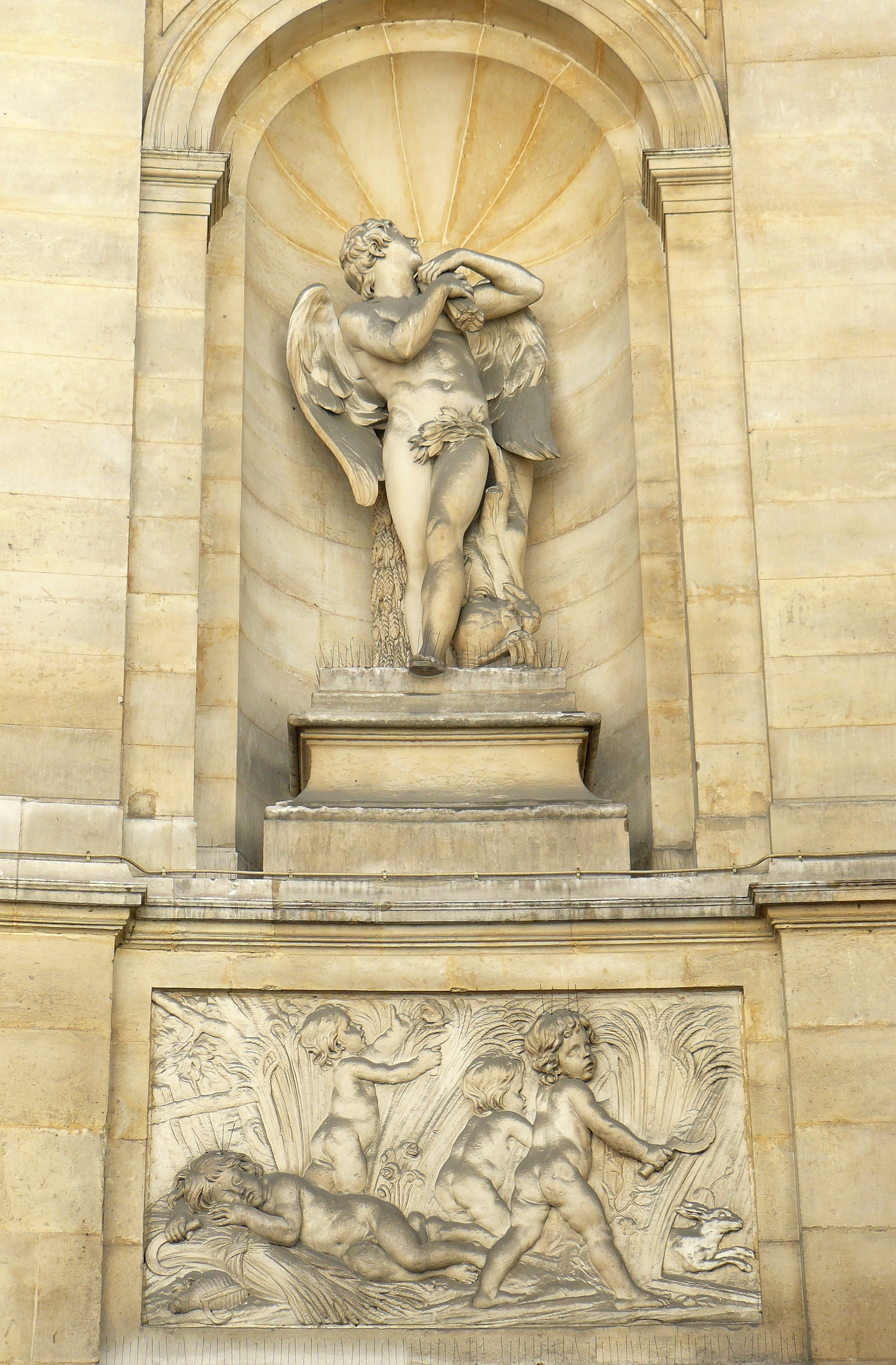
Bas-relief of Summer

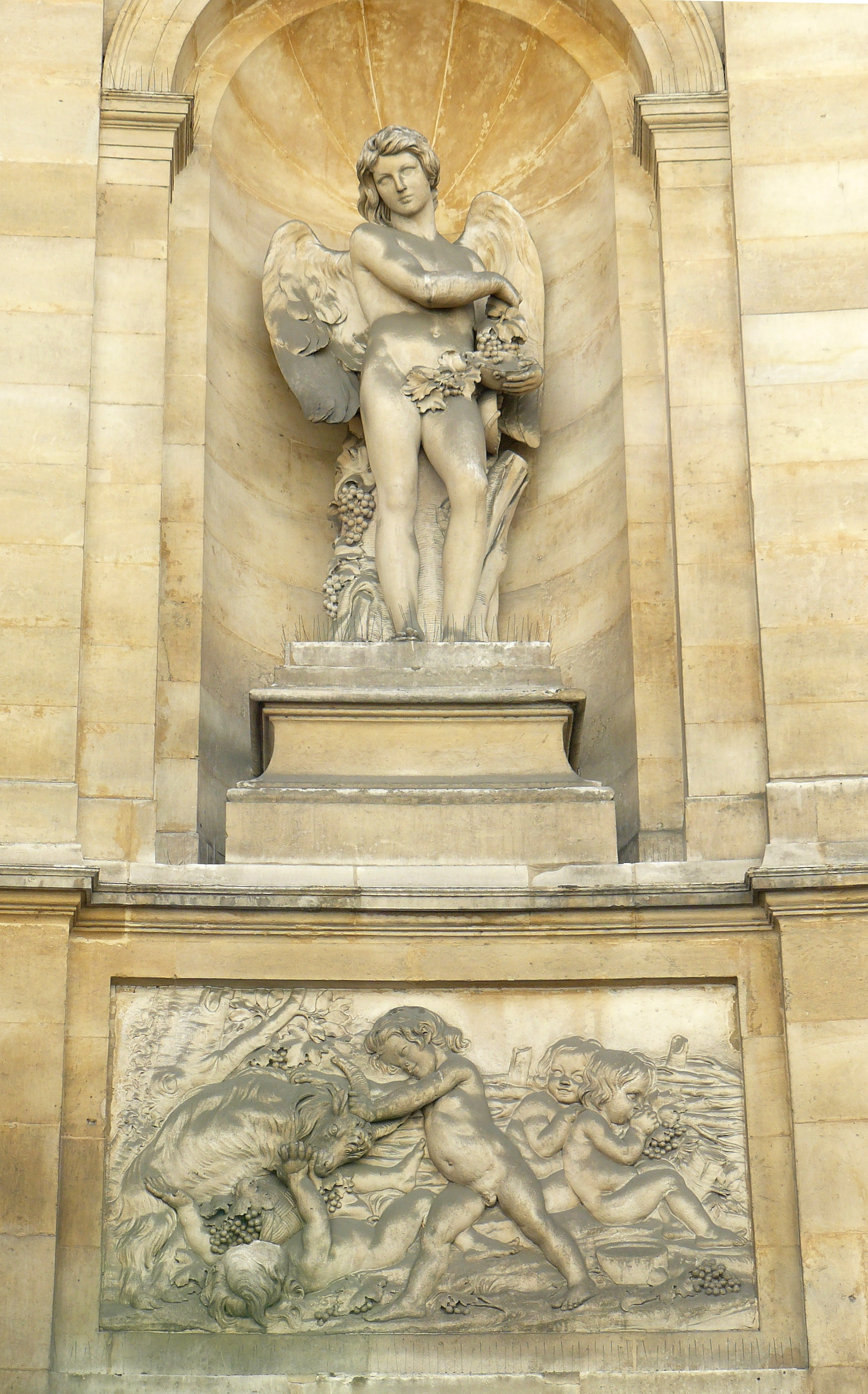
Bas-relief of Autumn

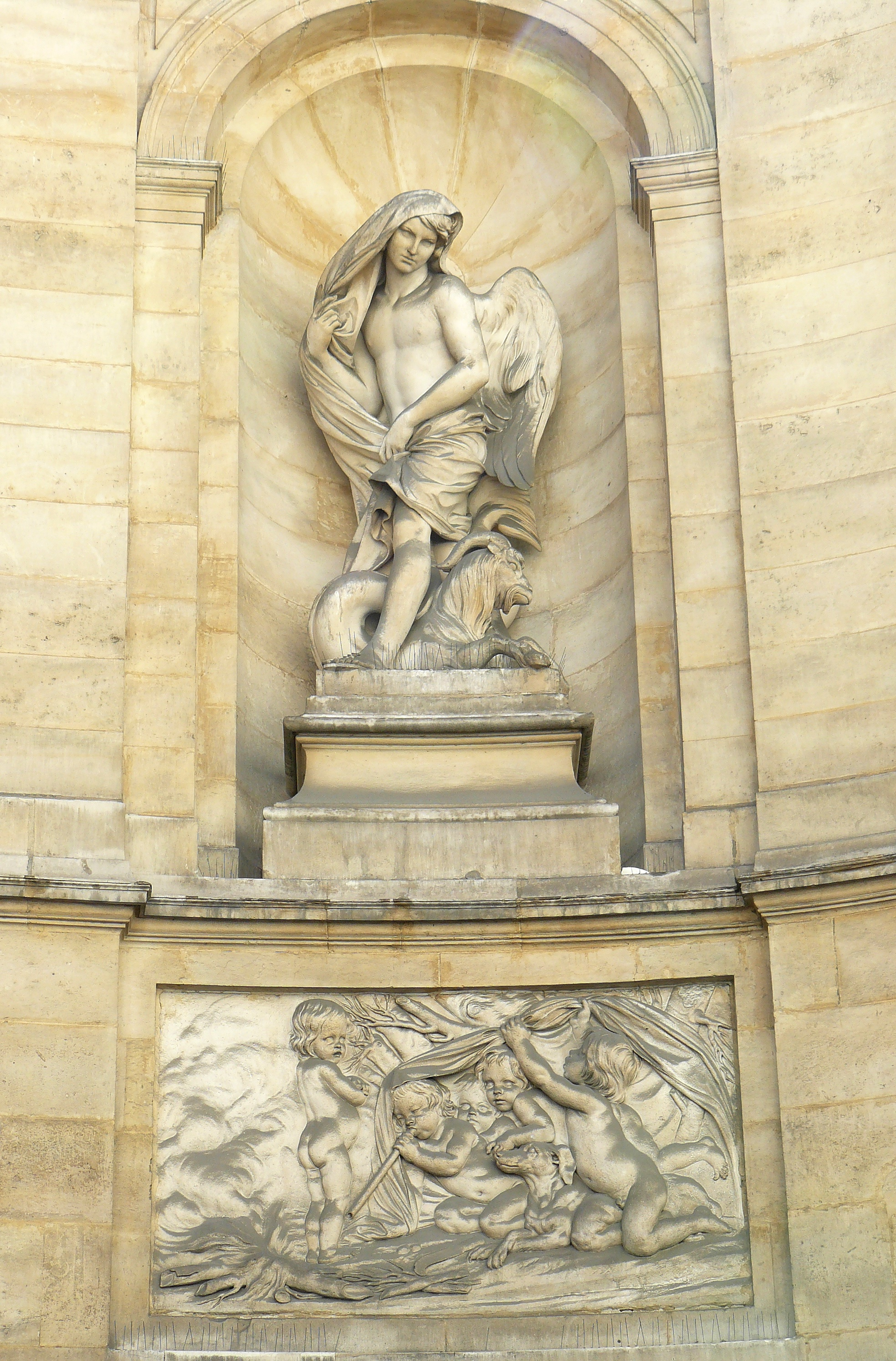
Bas-relief of Winter
