= Louis period styles =

Styles of French architecture and interior design

Louis period styles is the collective name for five distinct styles of French architecture and interior design. The styles span the period from 1610 to 1793.

== Styles ==
Each of the five styles is named for the ruler during the particular period:

- 1610–1643: Louis XIII style (Louis Treize), in the early phase of French Baroque
- 1643–1715: Louis XIV style (Louis Quatorze)
- 1715–1723: French Regency style (Régence), during the regency of Philippe II, duc d’Orléans
- 1723–1774: Louis XV style (Louis Quinze)
- 1774–1793: Louis XVI style (Louis Seize)

== Applications ==
The terms are applied as style terms for the French forms of:

- Architecture
- Interior design
- Fine arts
- Decorative arts
- Furniture
- Crafts
