= Louis XV style =

Architectural and decorative style

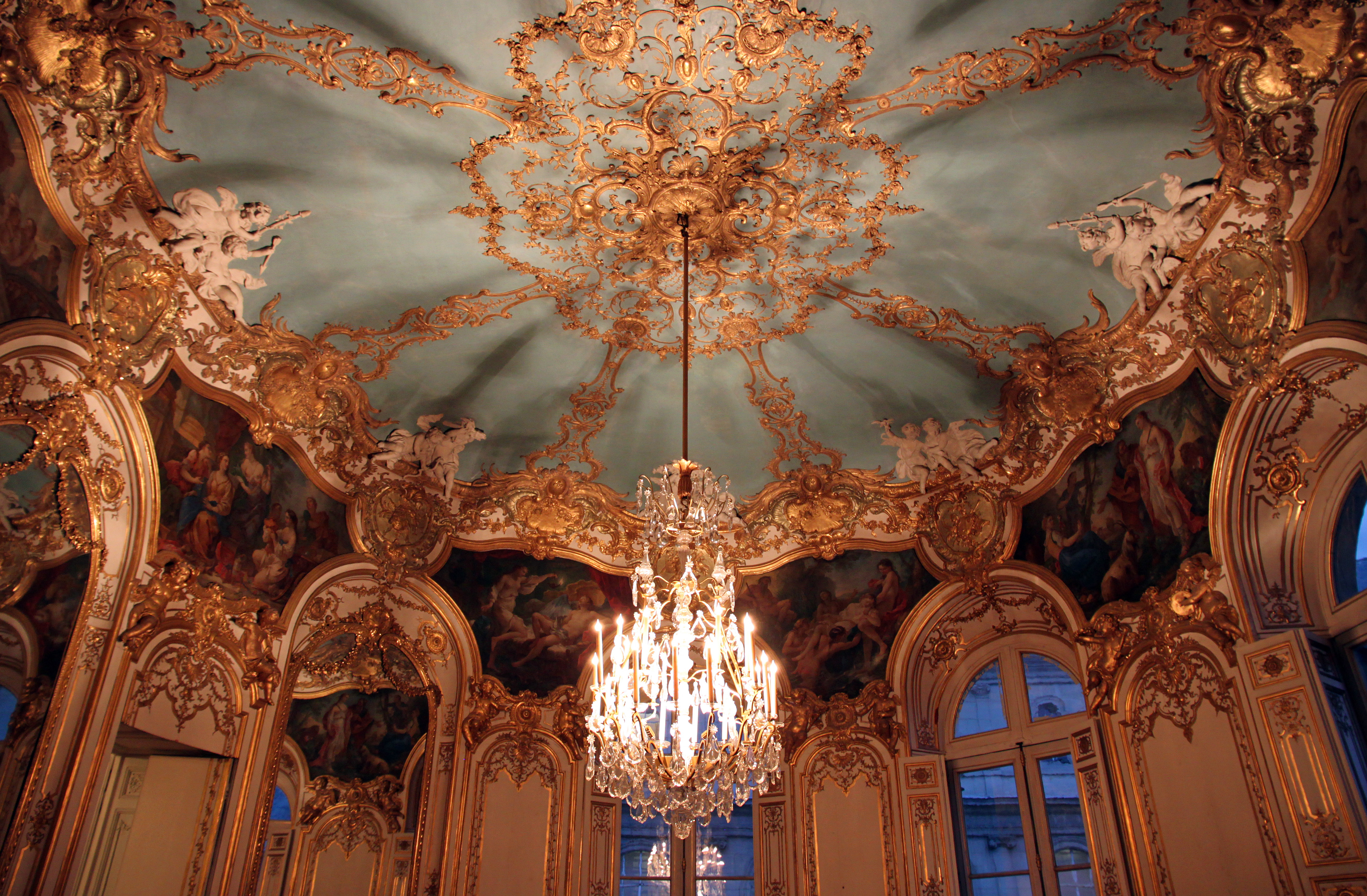
Oval salon of the Hôtel de Soubise (now Archives Nationales), Paris (1735–1740)

The Louis XV style or Louis Quinze (/ˌluːi ˈkæ̃z/, French: [lwi kɛ̃z]) is a style of architecture and decorative arts which appeared during the reign of Louis XV. From 1710 until about 1730, a period known as the Régence, it was largely an extension of the Louis XIV style of his great-grandfather and predecessor, Louis XIV. From about 1730 until about 1750, it became more original, decorative and exuberant, in what was known as the Rocaille style, under the influence of the King's mistress, Madame de Pompadour. It marked the beginning of the European Rococo movement. From 1750 until the King's death in 1774, it became more sober, ordered, and began to show the influences of Neoclassicism.

== Architecture ==
The chief architect of the King was Jacques Gabriel from 1734 until 1742, and then his more famous son, Ange-Jacques Gabriel, until the end of the reign. His major works included the Ecole Militaire, the ensemble of buildings overlooking the Place Louis XV (now Place de la Concorde; 1761–1770), and the Petit Trianon at Versailles (1764). Over the course of the reign of Louis XV, while interiors were lavishly decorated, the façades gradually became simpler, less ornamented and more classical. The façades designed by Gabriel were carefully rhymed and balanced by rows of windows and columns, and, on large buildings like the Place de la Concorde, often featured grand arcades on the street level, and classical pediments or balustrades on the roofline. Ornamental features sometimes included curving wrought-iron balconies with undulating rocaille designs, similar to the rocaille decoration of the interiors.

The religious architecture of the period was also sober and monumental, and it tended, at the end of the reign, toward the neoclassical. Major examples include the Church of Saint-Genevieve (now the Panthéon), built from 1758 to 1790 to a design by Jacques-Germain Soufflot, and the Église Saint-Philippe-du-Roule (1765–1777) by Jean-François Chalgrin, which featured an enormous barrel-vaulted nave.

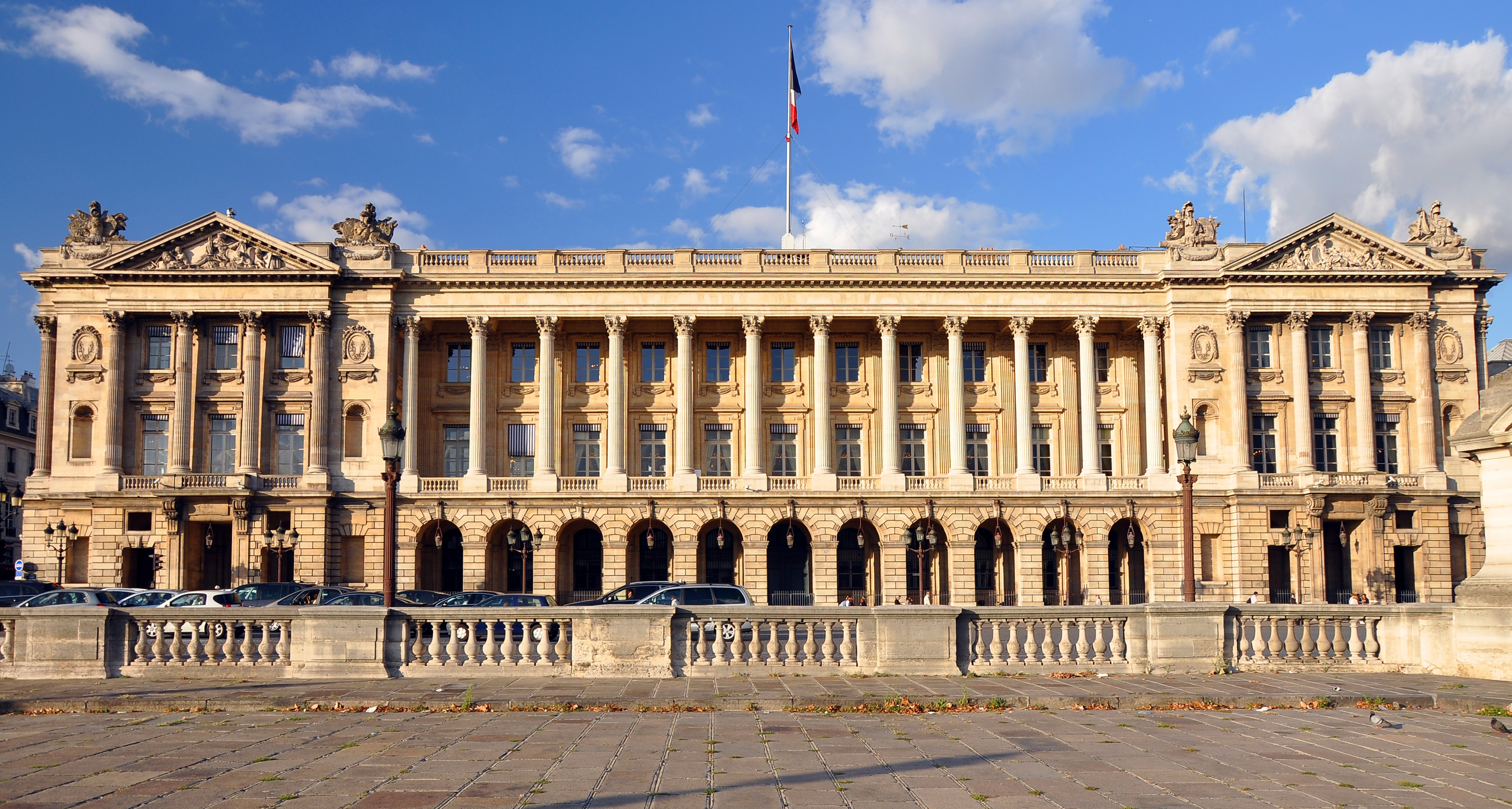
Hôtel de la Marine on the Place de la Concorde (1761–1770)

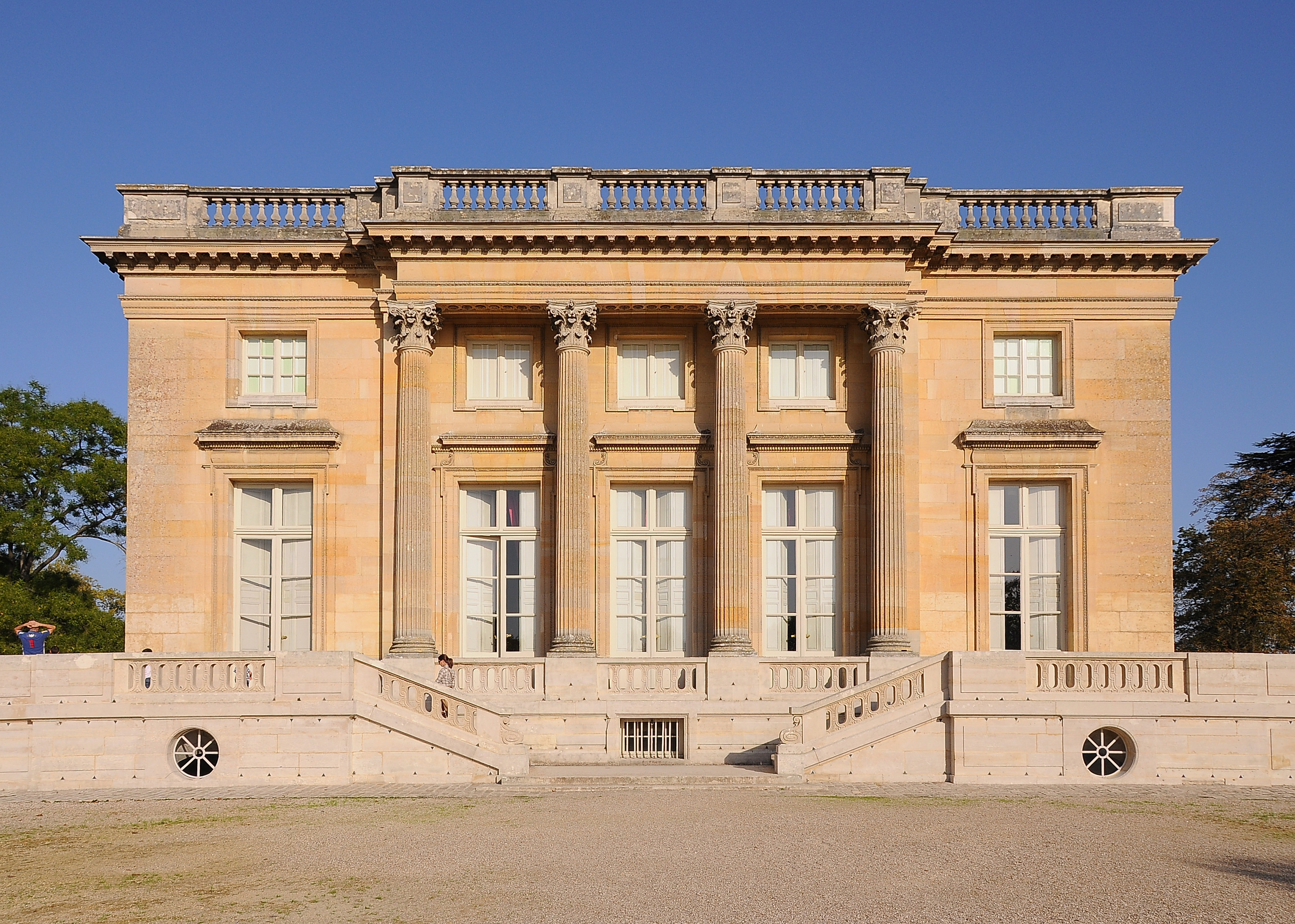
Petit Trianon (1764)

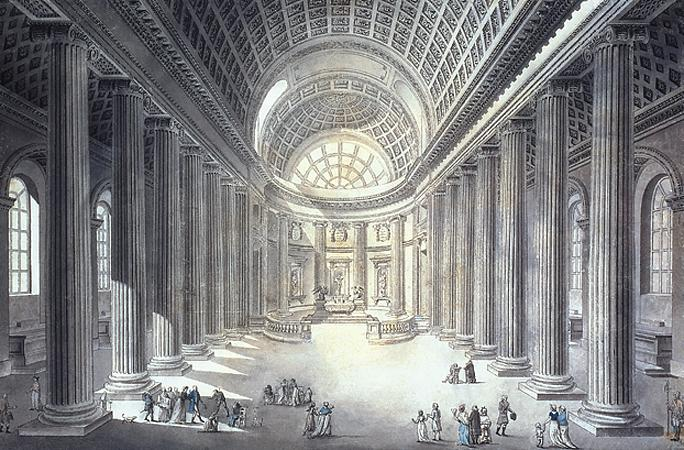
Interior of Church of Saint-Philippe-du-Roule, Paris (1765–1770)

== Interior decoration ==
Interior decoration during the reign of Louis XV fell into two periods; the first especially featured rocaille ornament, sculpted sinuous curves and counter-curves, often in floral and vegetative patterns, applied to the panels of the walls, often with medallions in the center. The panels large mirrors were framed in often framed with sculpted palm leaves or other floral decoration. Unlike the rococo style, the ornament was usually restrained, symmetrical and balanced. In the early period of the style, the designs were often inspired by French versions of Chinese art, animals, especially monkeys (Singerie) and arabesques, or themes taken from works of the artists of the period, including Jean Bérain the Younger, Watteau and Jean Audran.

After 1750, in reaction to the excesses of the earlier style, the designs and moldings on the interior walls were white or pale colored, more geometric, decorated with sculpted garlands, roses, and crowns, and ornamented with designs inspired by ancient Greece and Rome. This style was found in the Salon de Compagnie at the Petit Trianon, and it was the predecessor of the Louis XVI style.

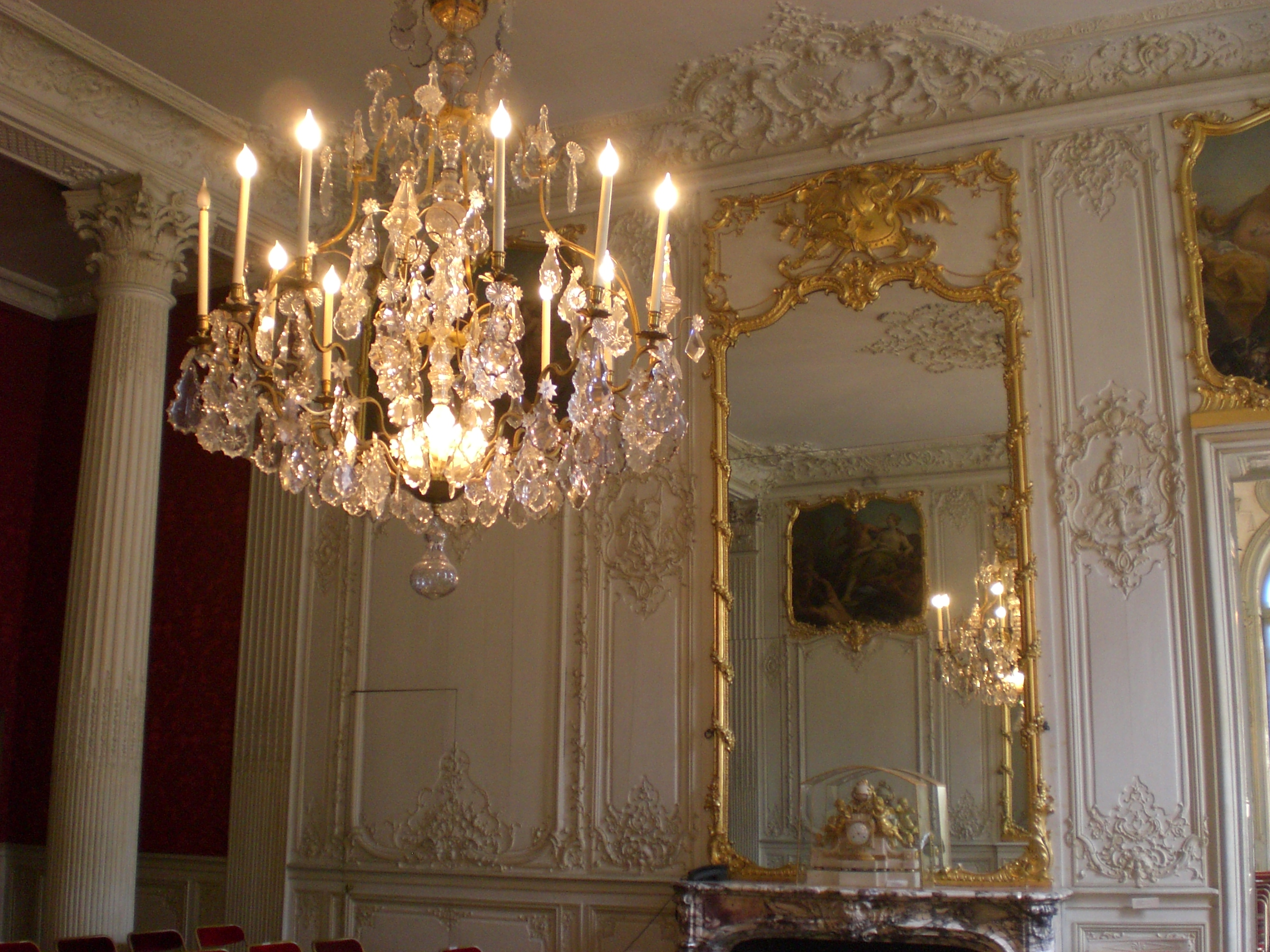
Chamber of the Prince, Hôtel de Soubise (1735–1740)

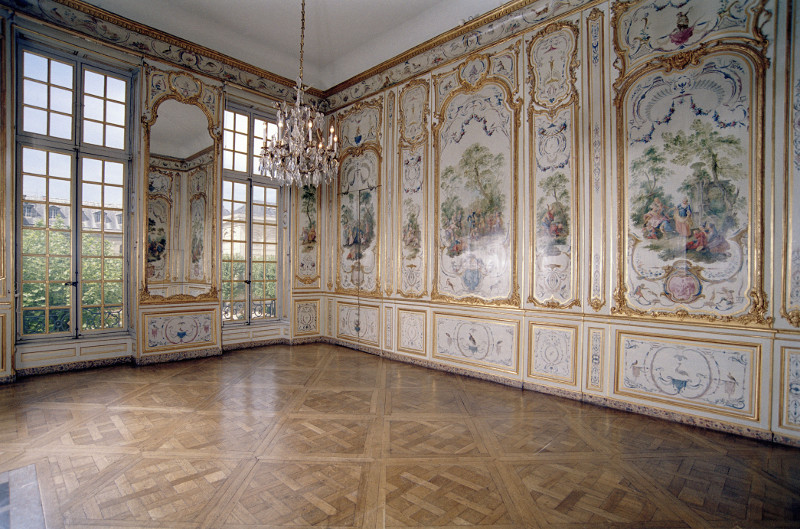
Hôtel de Rohan, the Cabinet des Singes, with whimsical pictures of monkeys

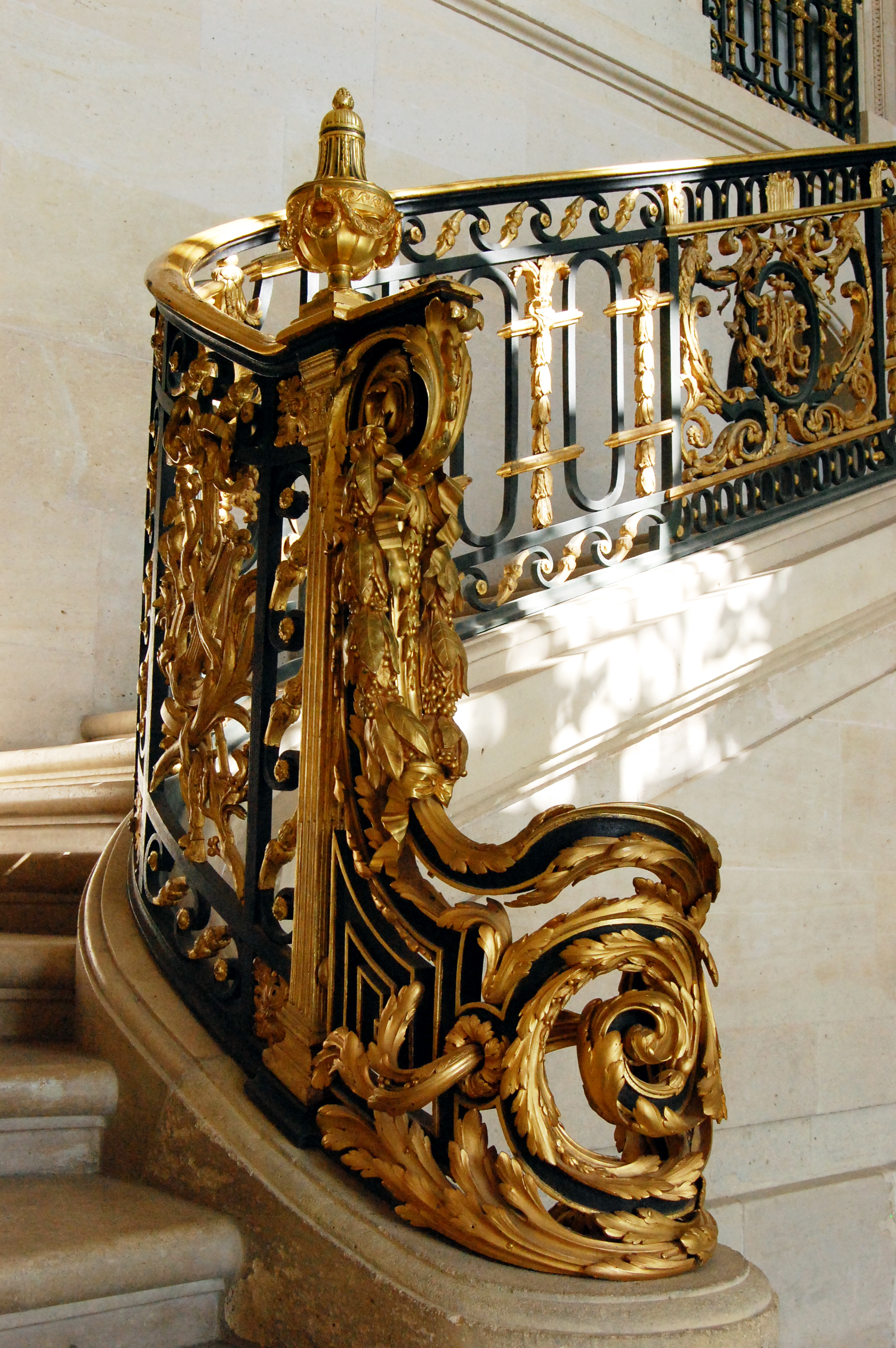
Beginning of the interior stairway at the Petit Trianon (1764)

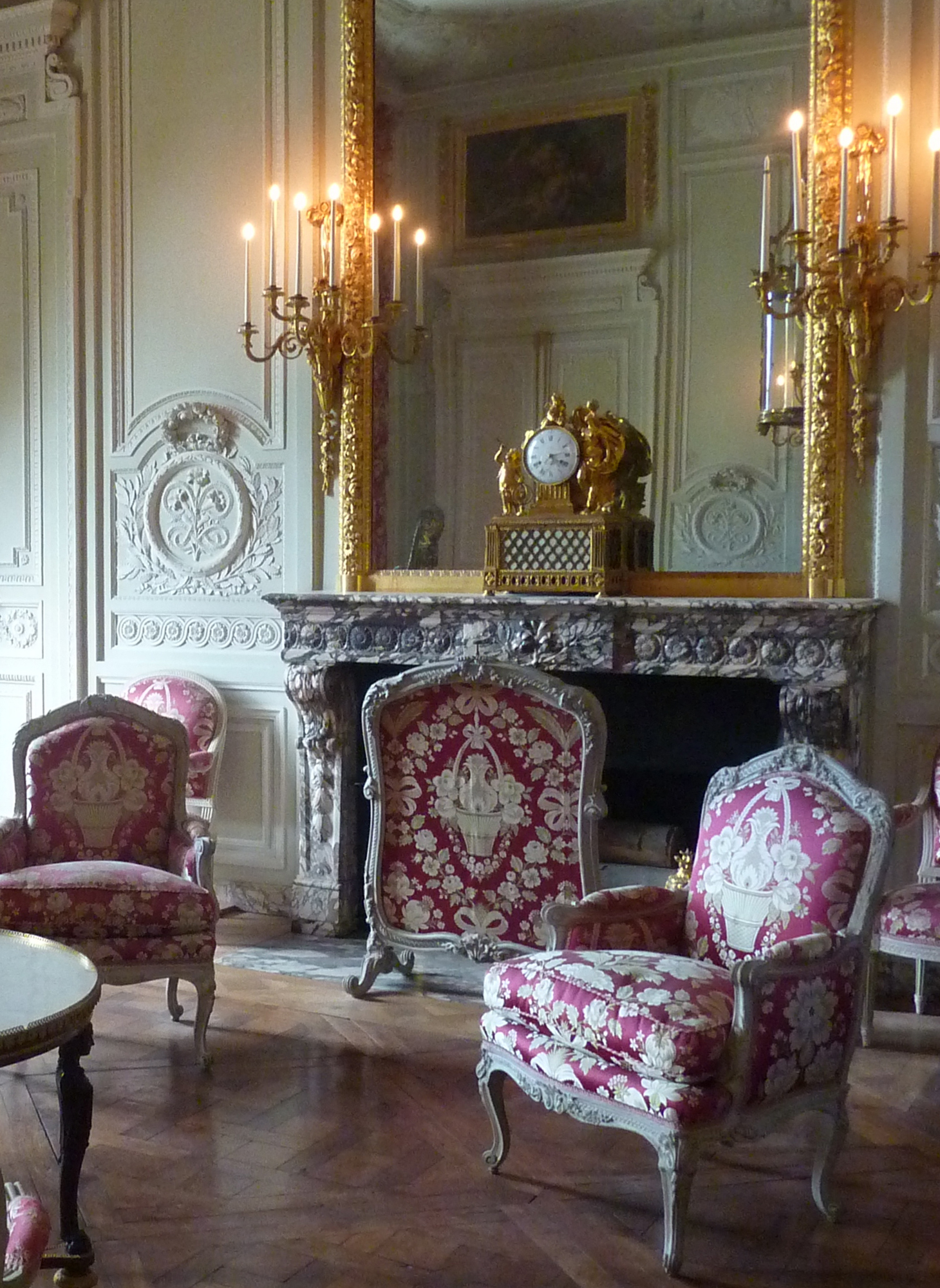
Salon de Compagnie of the Petit Trianon (1765)

== Furniture ==
The chairs of the Louis XV style, compared with those of Louis XIV, were characterized by lightness, comfort and harmony of lines. The traverse support of the legs disappeared, and the chairs were designed so one could sit back comfortably. The legs had a curving 'S shape. The carved decor featured sculpted fleurettes, palmettes, seashells, and foliage. The dossier, or back of the chair, was violones, slightly curved like a violin. Several new variants of chairs appeared including the bergere, with stuffed upholstered arms, A confessional, with upholstered and padded arms; the Marquise, a bergere seating two persons, with a low back, and short arms.

The console table was a table designed to be placed against a wall, usually used for displaying art objects; it was almost always in the rocaille style, with undulating curves, modeled after seashells and foliage. very sinuous, twisting rocaille modeled after seashells and foliage.

The commode was a new type of furniture which had first appeared late in the reign of Louis XIV. It was a chest drawers resting on four S-shaped legs. It usually featured gilded bronze ornament, but during the reign of Louis XV, it was also covered with plaques of exotic woods of different colors in geometric patterns or floral shapes. A particular variation, called the façon de Chine or "Chinese fashion" emerged, which contrasted the gilded bronze against black lacquered wood. A large number of skilled ébénistes from around Europe were employed to fine wood Commodes and other furniture for the King. They included Jean-François Oeben, Roger Vandercruse Lacroix, Gilles Joubert, Antoine Gaudreau, and Martin Carlin.

A variety of other new types of furniture appeared, including the chiffonier, a cabinet with five drawers, and the table de toilette, a kind of desk-table with three shutters, the central one having a mirror.

Later in the reign of Louis XV, between 1755 and 1760, tastes in furniture began to change. The rocaille designs became more discreet and restrained, and the influence of antiquity and neo-classicism began to appear in new designs of furniture. The Commodes became to have more geometric forms; the decoration turned from rocaille to geometric forms, garlands of oak leaves, flowers and classical motifs. A new type of tall cabinet, the Cartonnier, made its appearance between 1760 and 1765. It took its inspiration from Greek mythology and architecture, with friezes, vaulting, sculpted trophies, bronze lion heads, and other classic, elements.

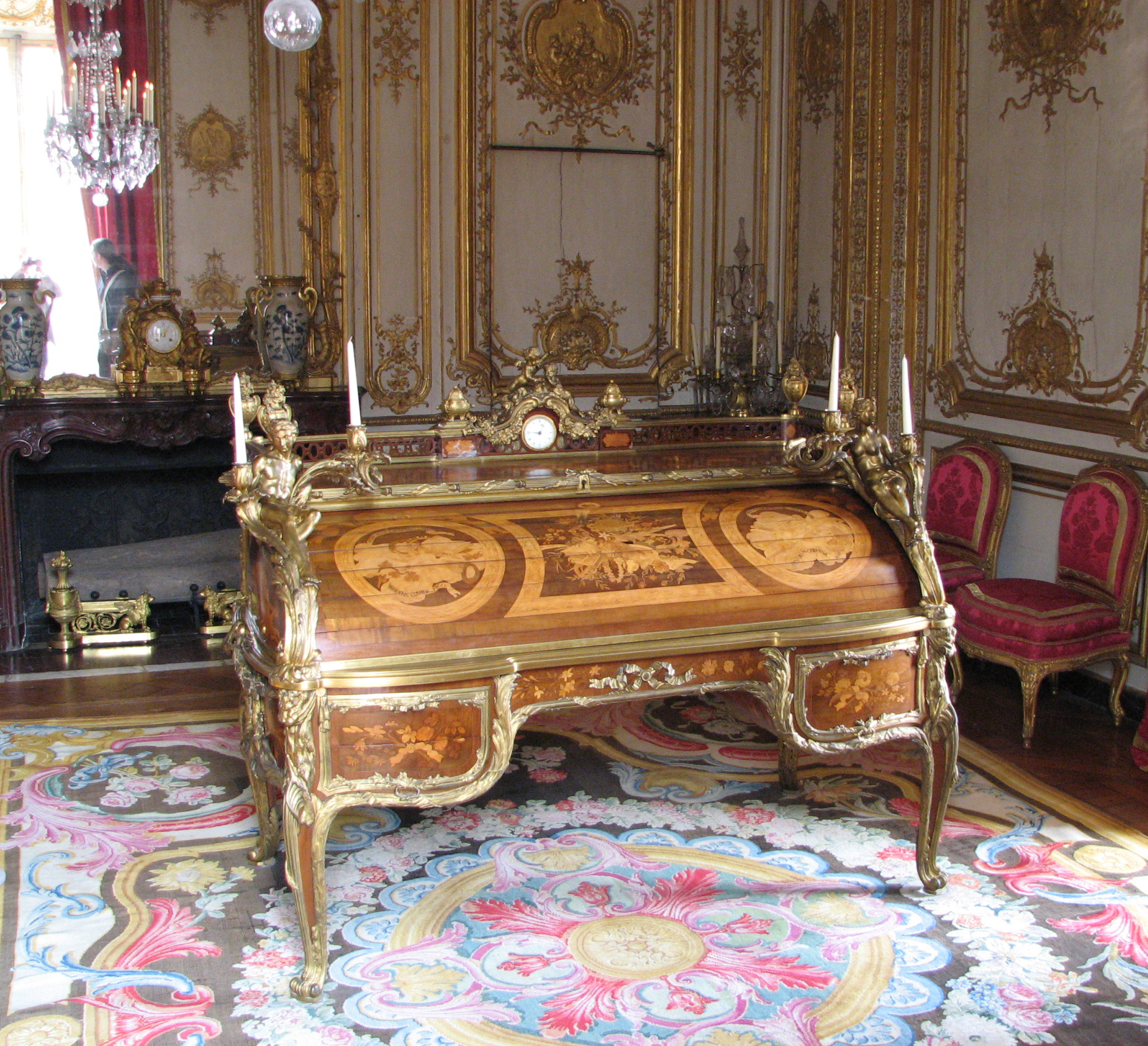
King's desk at Palace of Versailles (1760–1769)

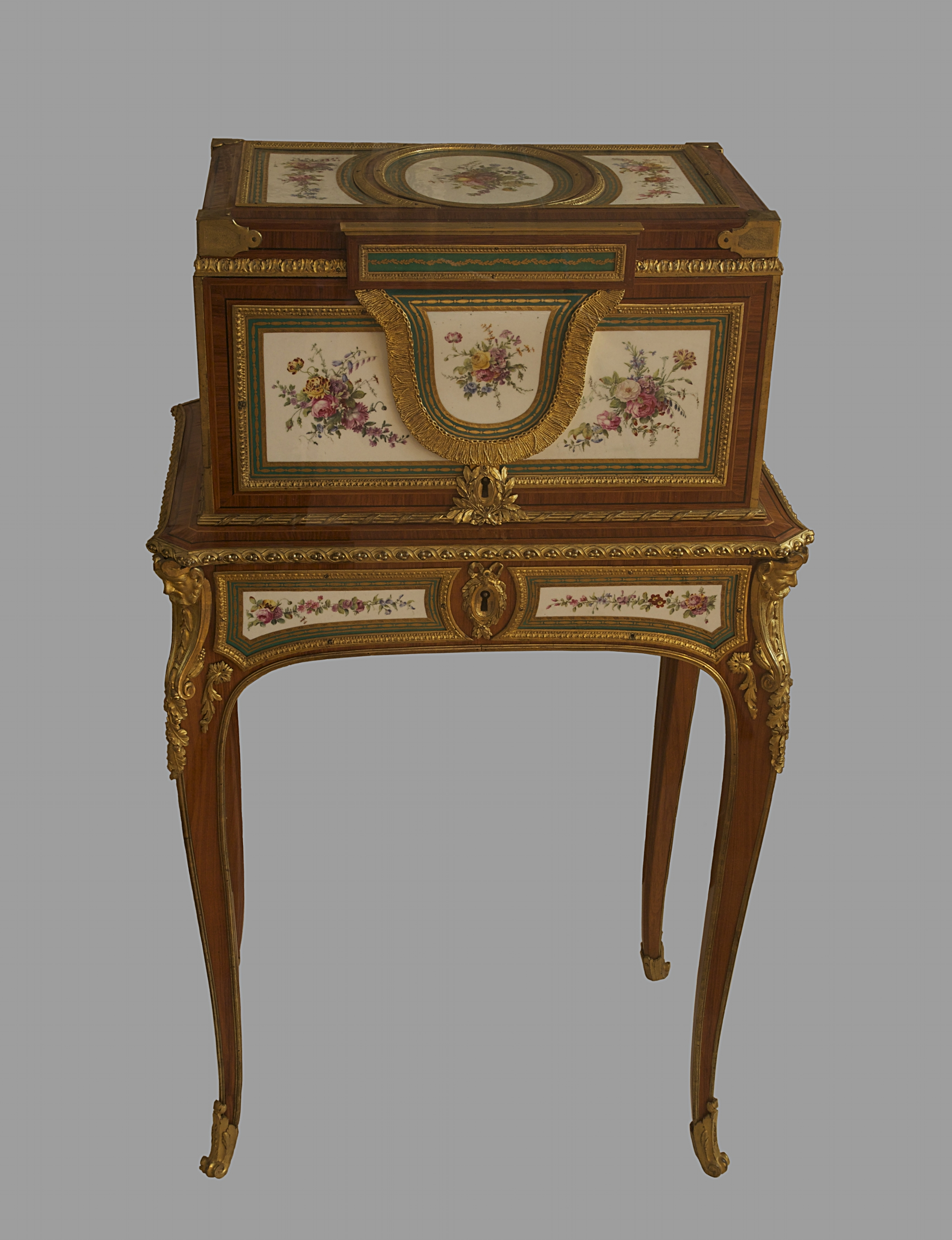
Jewel box of the Dauphine Marie Antoinette (1770)

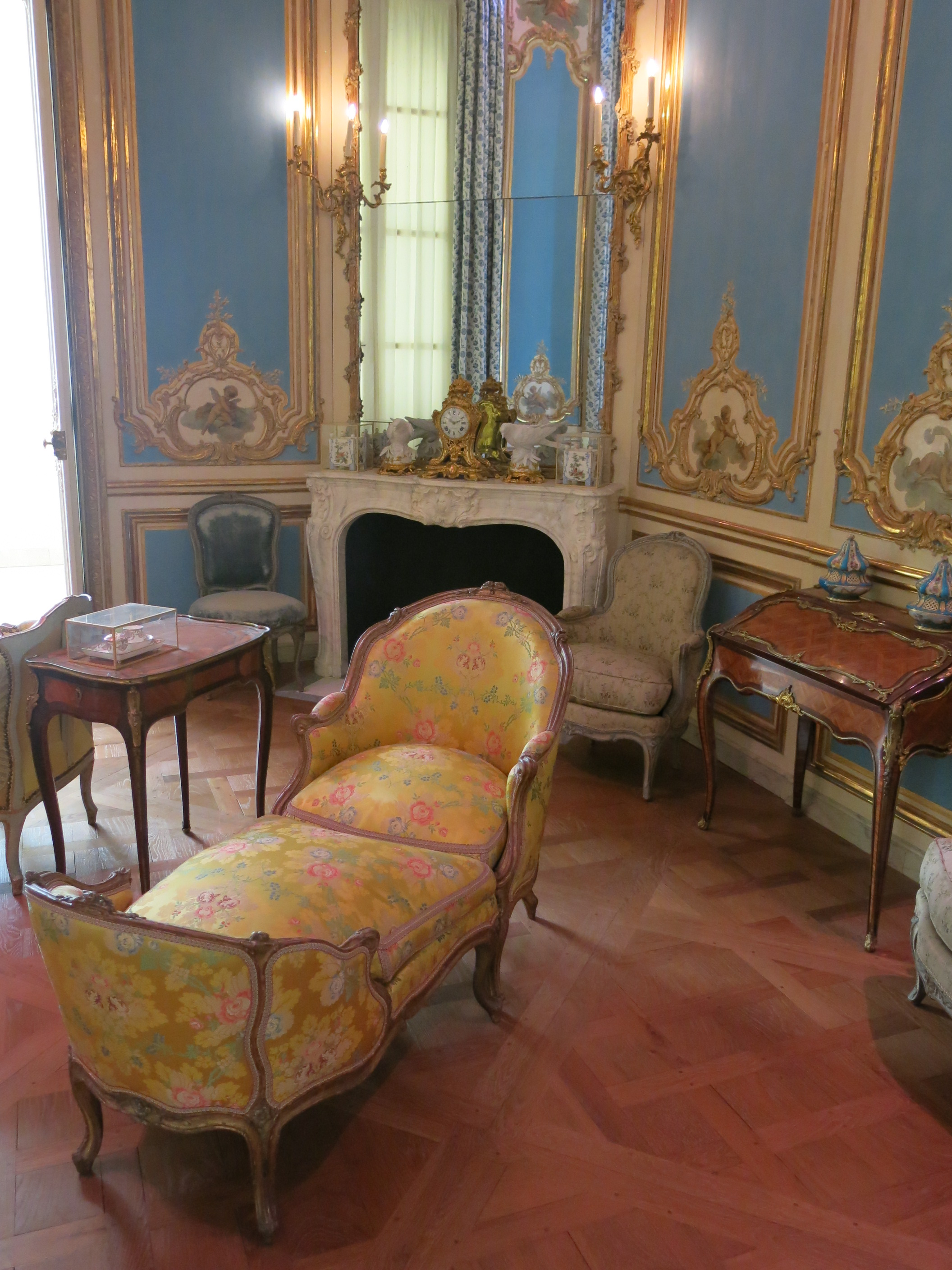
Louis XV salon with Duchesse divided seat (Louvre)

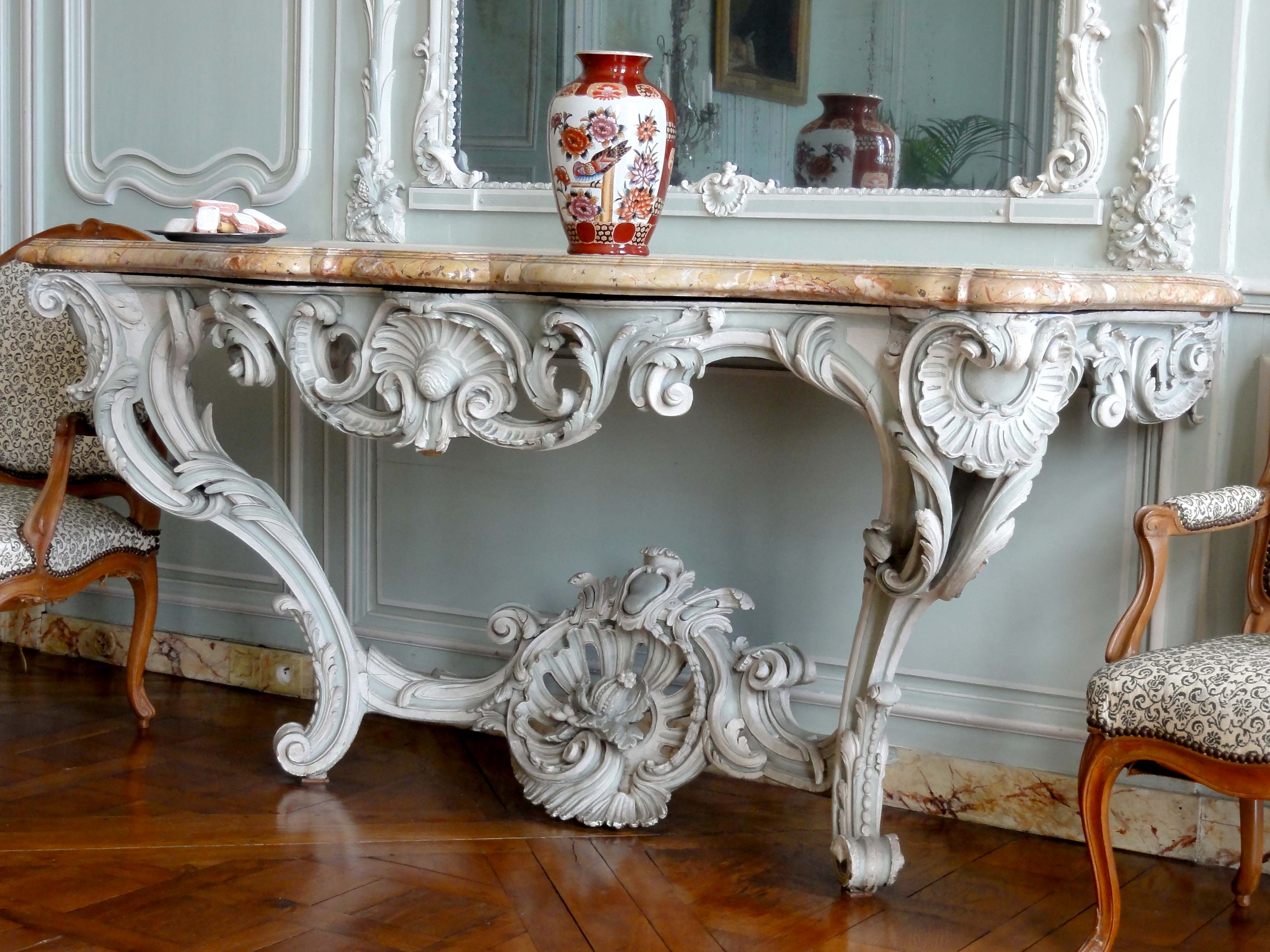
Rocaille console at the Domaine of Villarceaux

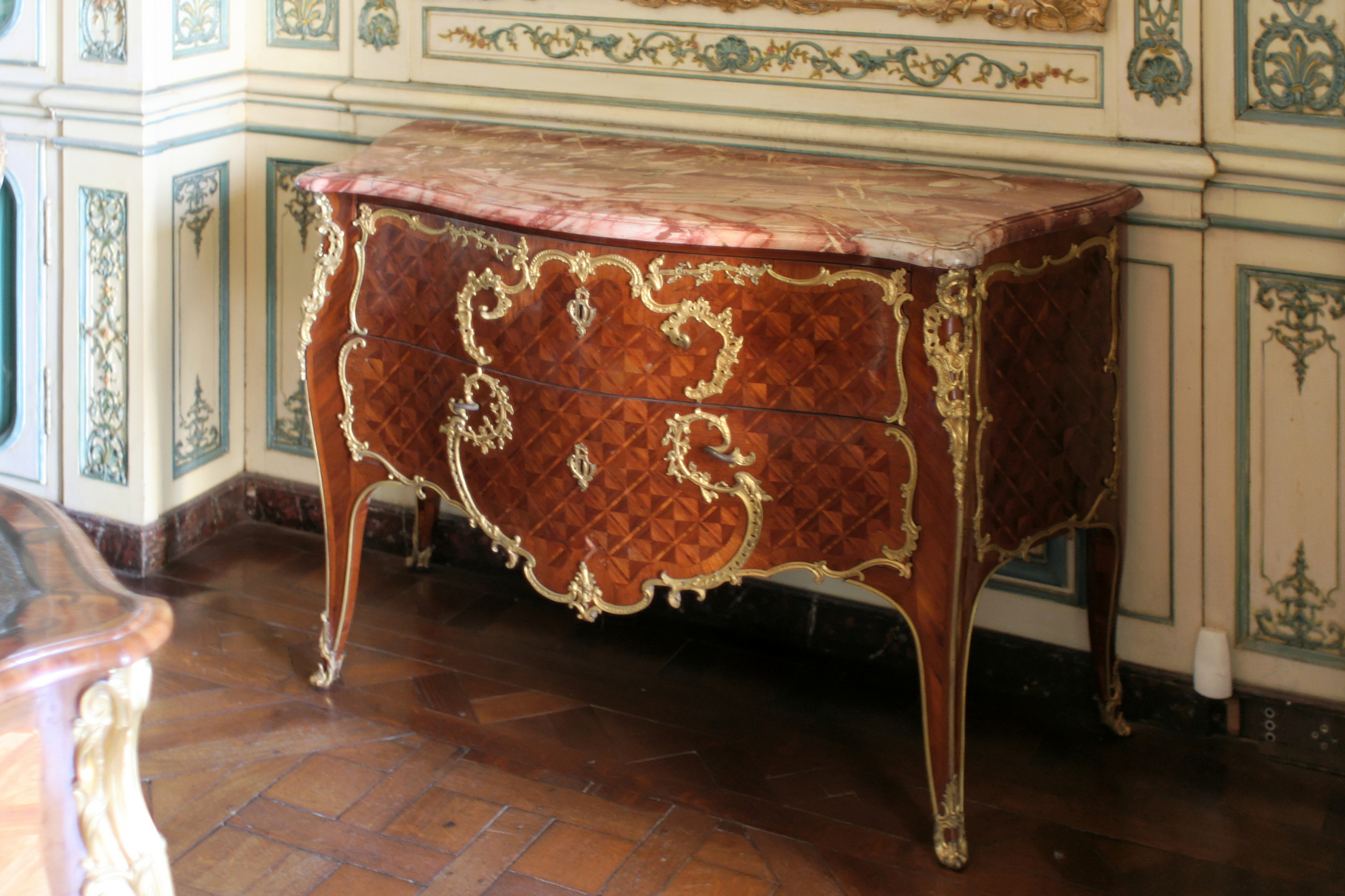
Commode by Antoine Gaudreau in the apartment of the Dauphin at Versailles (1745)

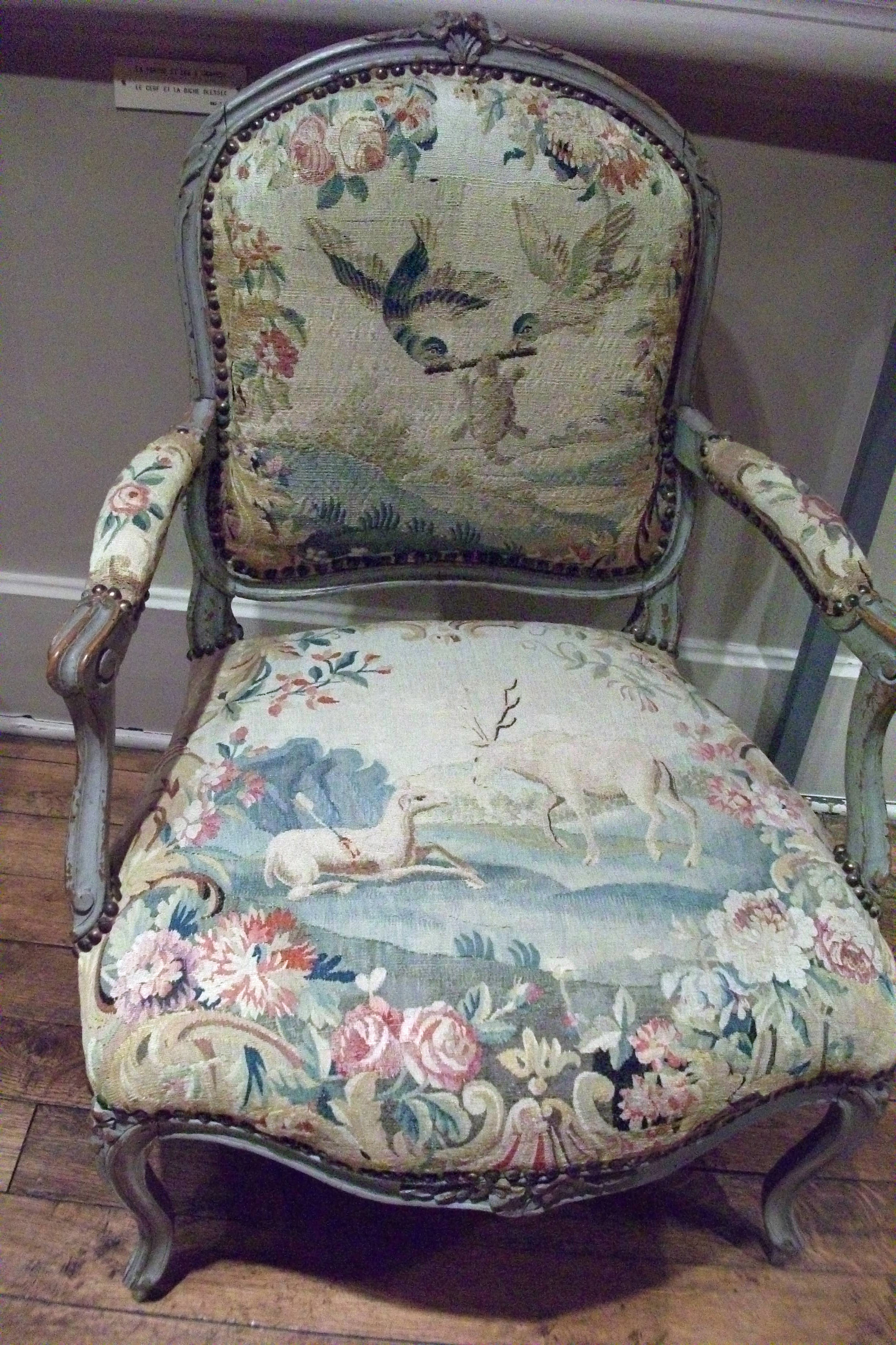
Louis XV armchair with Beauvais tapestry

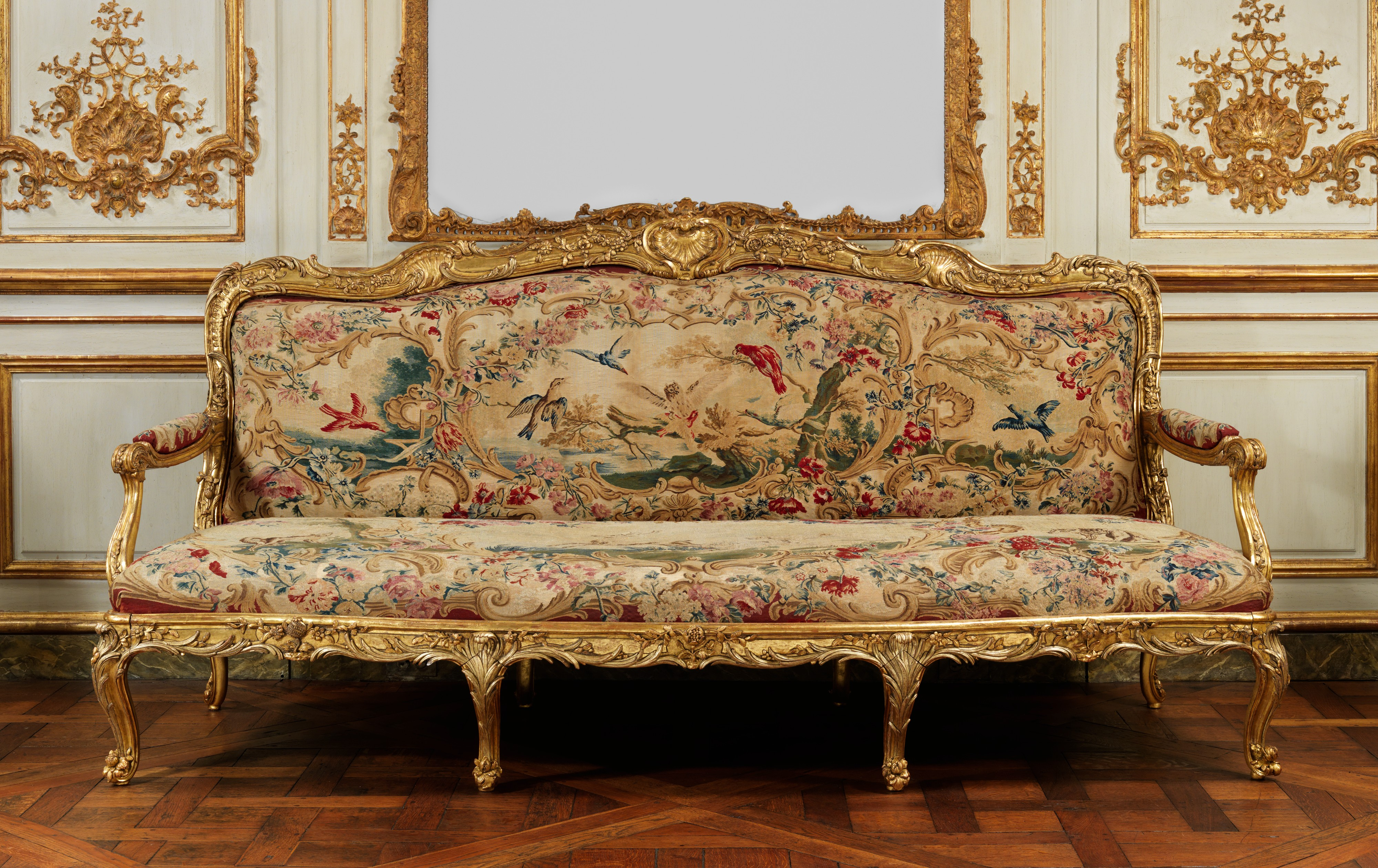
Settee, Metropolitan Museum of Art, (1754–56)

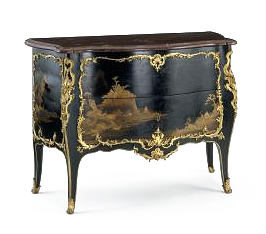
Lacquered Commode, by Bernard II van Risamburgh, Victoria and Albert Museum (1750–1760)

== Painting ==
The dominant subjects of painting in the early reign of Louis XV were mythology and history, the same as those of Louis XIV. Later in the reign, when Louis began to construct new apartments within the palaces of Versailles and Fontainebleau, his tastes turned more to pastoral scenes and genre painting. Madame de Pompadour, the king's mistress, was also one of the major patrons of the artists of the period.

The most favored artist of the King was François Boucher, He produced for the King art of every description; religious paintings, genre scenes, landscapes, pastorals, and exotic scenes, frequently featuring gatherings of cheerful and seductive nudes. As the king's other great passion was hunting, he painted Leopard hunt (1765) and Crocodile hunt (1767) for the King's new apartments at Versailles. In 1767, near the end of the career, he was named First Painter of the King.

Other notable painters included Jean Baptiste Oudry, whose hunting scenes decorated royal apartments in Versailles, and were made into tapestries and popular engravings; the portrait artists Maurice Quentin de la Tour and Jean-Marc Nattier, who made portraits for the royal family and aristocracy; and the genre painter Jean-Baptiste-Siméon Chardin.

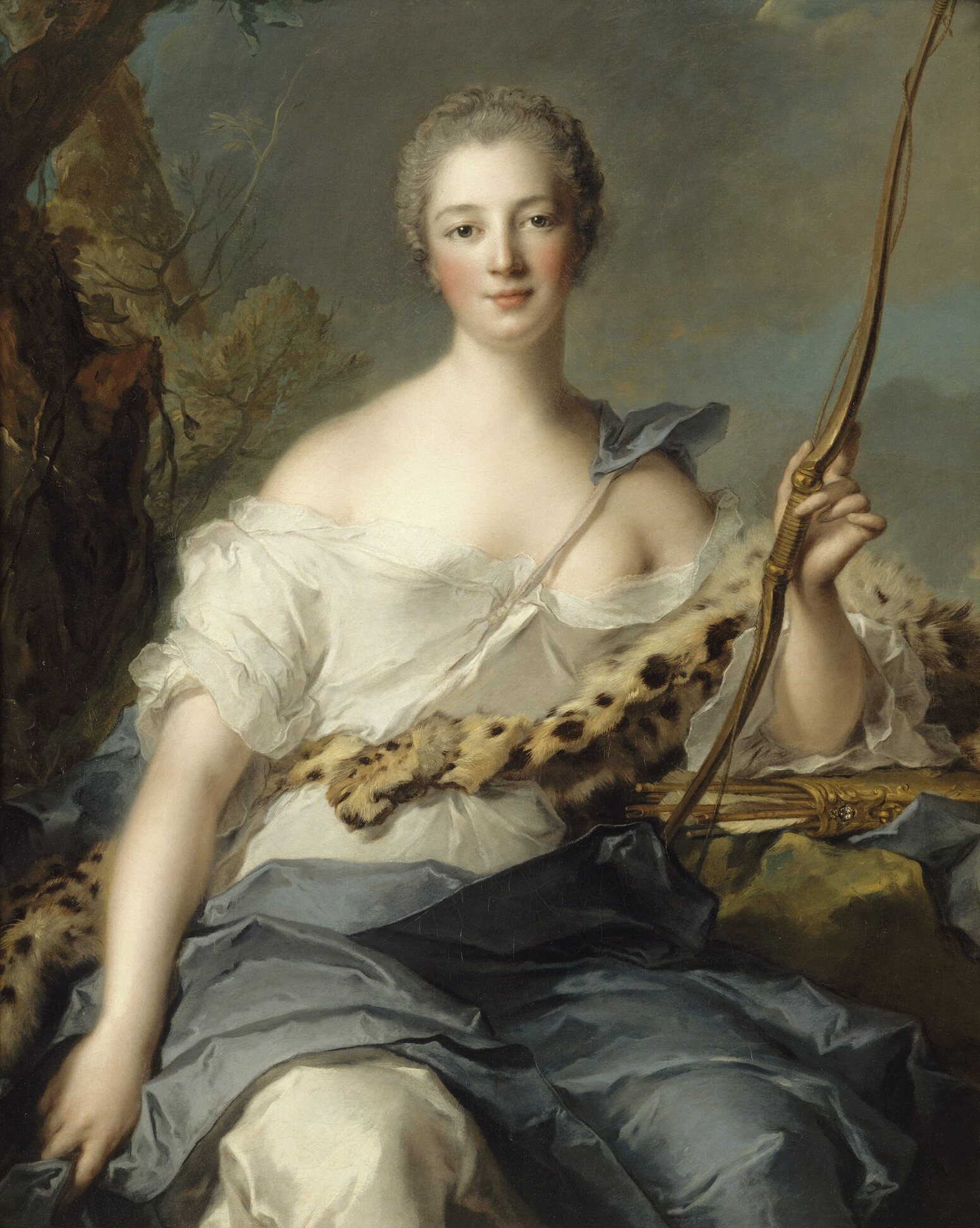
Madame de Pompadour as Diane the Huntress, by Jean-Marc Nattier (1746)

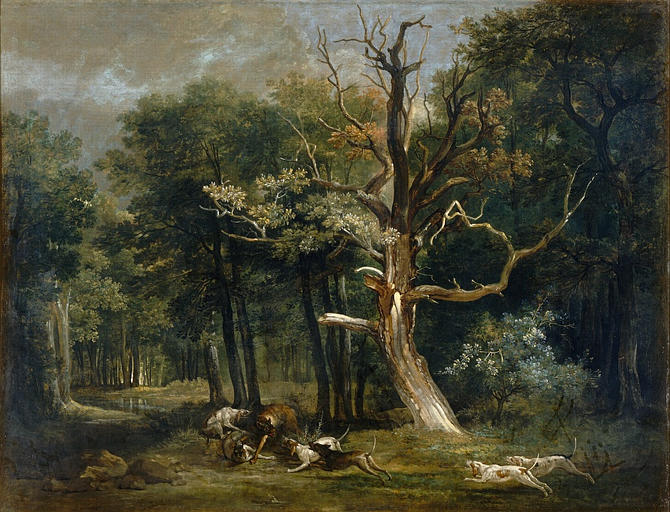
Wolf hunt in the forest by Jean-Baptiste Oudry (1748)

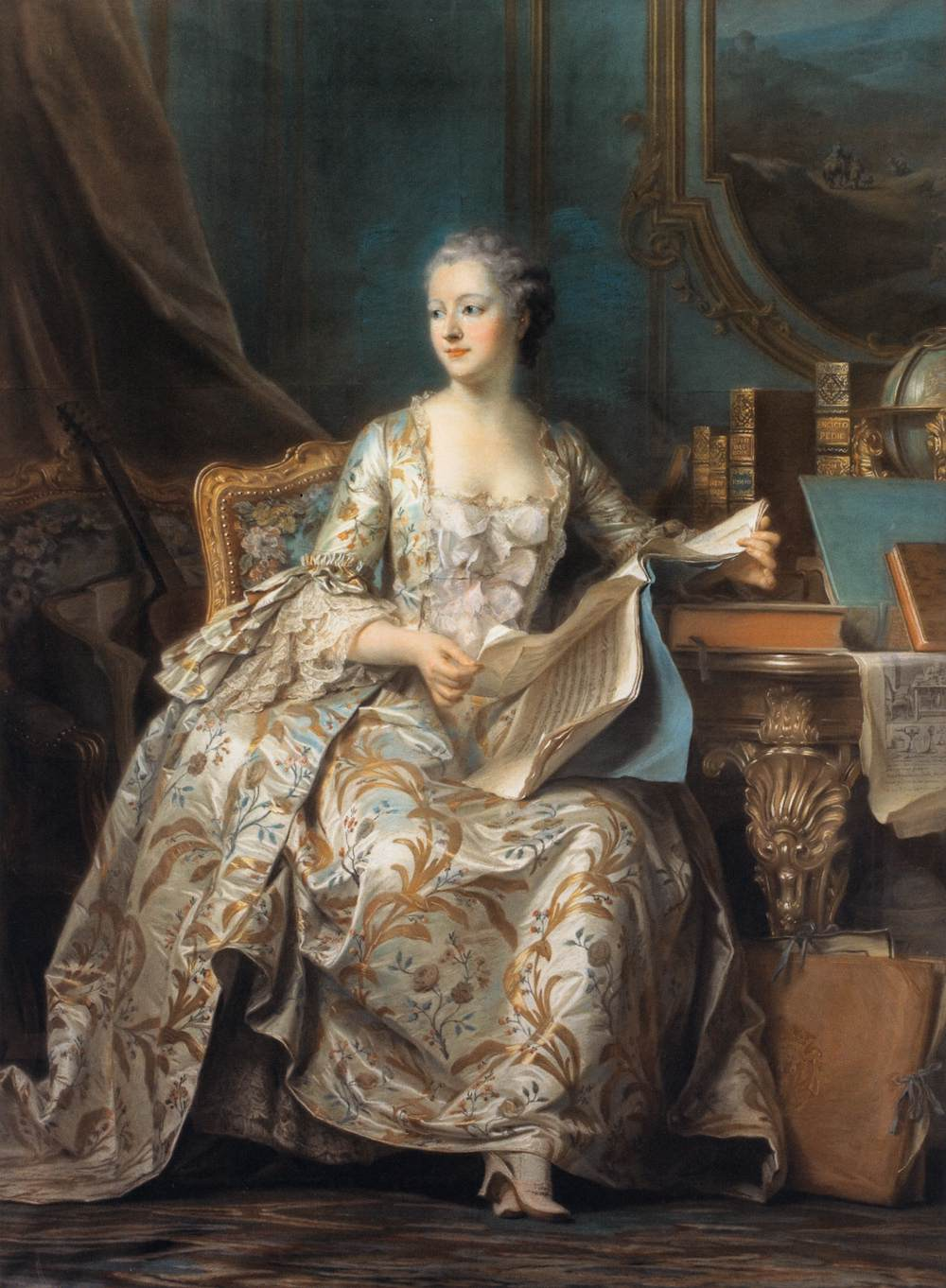
Madame de Pompadour by Maurice Quentin de La Tour (1755)

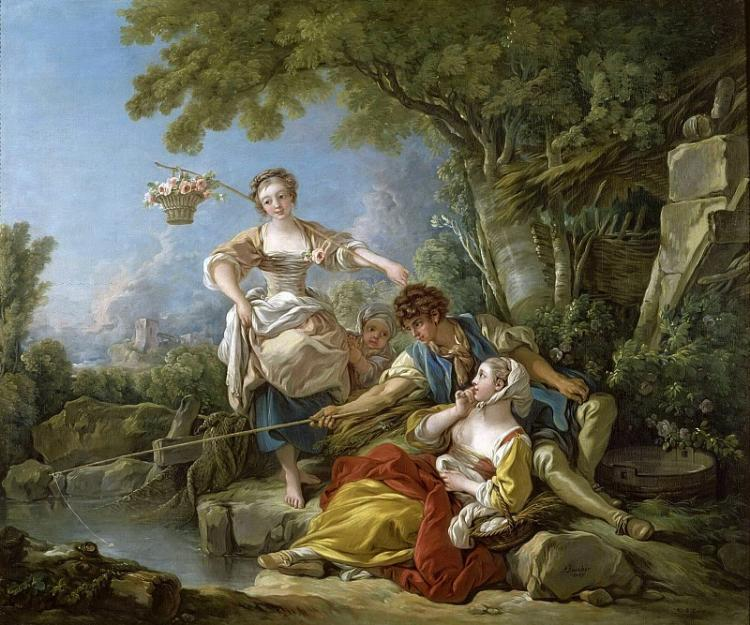
Fishing by François Boucher, Grand Trianon, (1757)

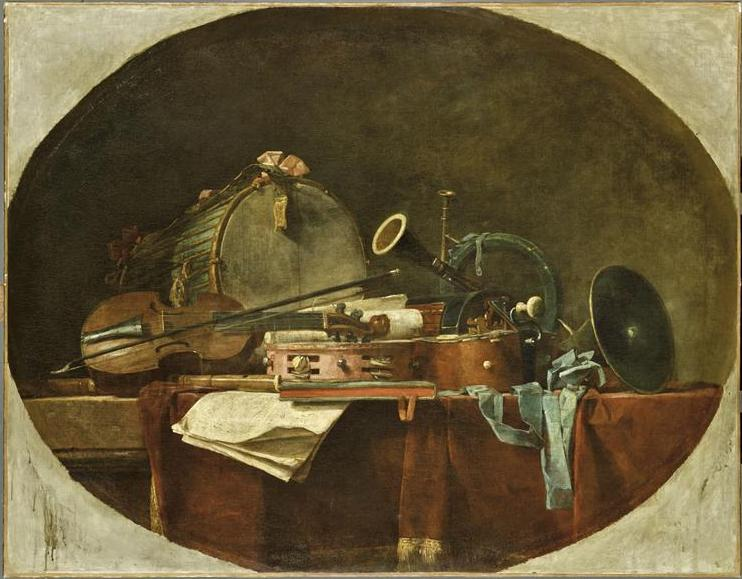
Attributes of civil music by Jean-Baptiste-Siméon Chardin, the Louvre (1757)

== Sculpture ==
The sculptural styles of the Grand Siécle of Louis XIV continued to dominate during most of the reign of Louis XV. Madame de Pompadour was a particularly enthusiastic patroness of sculpture, and many busts and statues were made of her or commissioned by her. The most prominent sculptors of the early period were the Guillaume Coustou the Younger and his brother, Guillaume Coustou the Elder, Robert Le Lorrain, and Edmé Bouchardon. Bouchardon created the equestrian statue of Louis XV for the center of the new Place Louis XV (now Place de la Concorde) which was modeled after that of Louis XIV in the Place Louis le Grand (now Place Vendôme) by François Girardon. After the death of Bouchardon, the statue was finished by another major monumentalist of the period, Jean-Baptiste Pigalle. In the later part of the reign of Louis XV, sculptors began to give greater attention to the faces; the leaders of this new style were Jean-Antoine Houdon noted for his busts of celebrated authors and statesmen, and Augustin Pajou, who made notable portrait busts of the natural scientist Georges-Louis Leclerc, Comte de Buffon and Madame du Barry. Sculpture began to reach a larger popular audience during this period, thanks to reproductions made from terra cotta and unglazed porcelain.

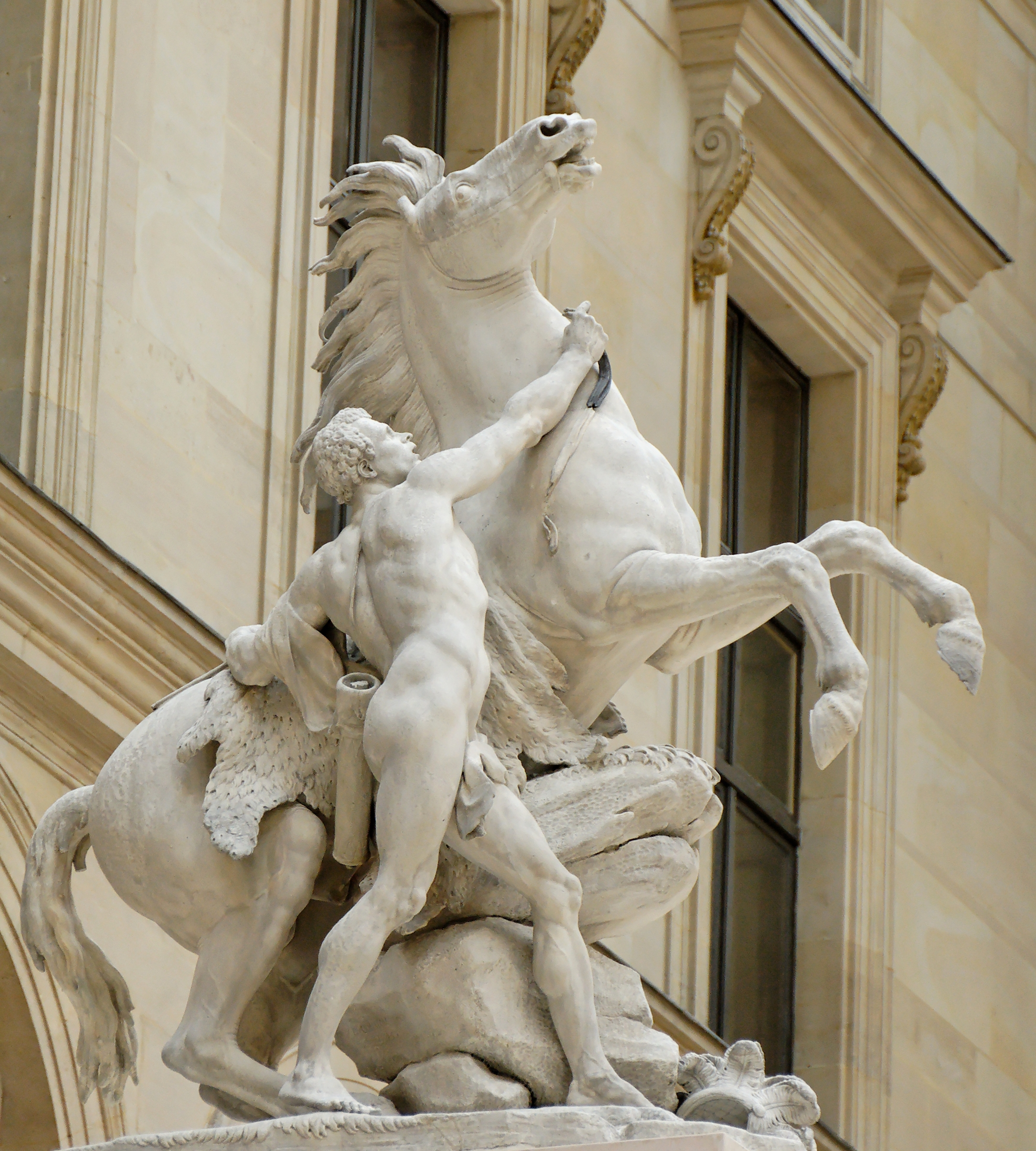
Marly Horses by Guillaume Coustou the Elder, the Louvre (1739–1745)

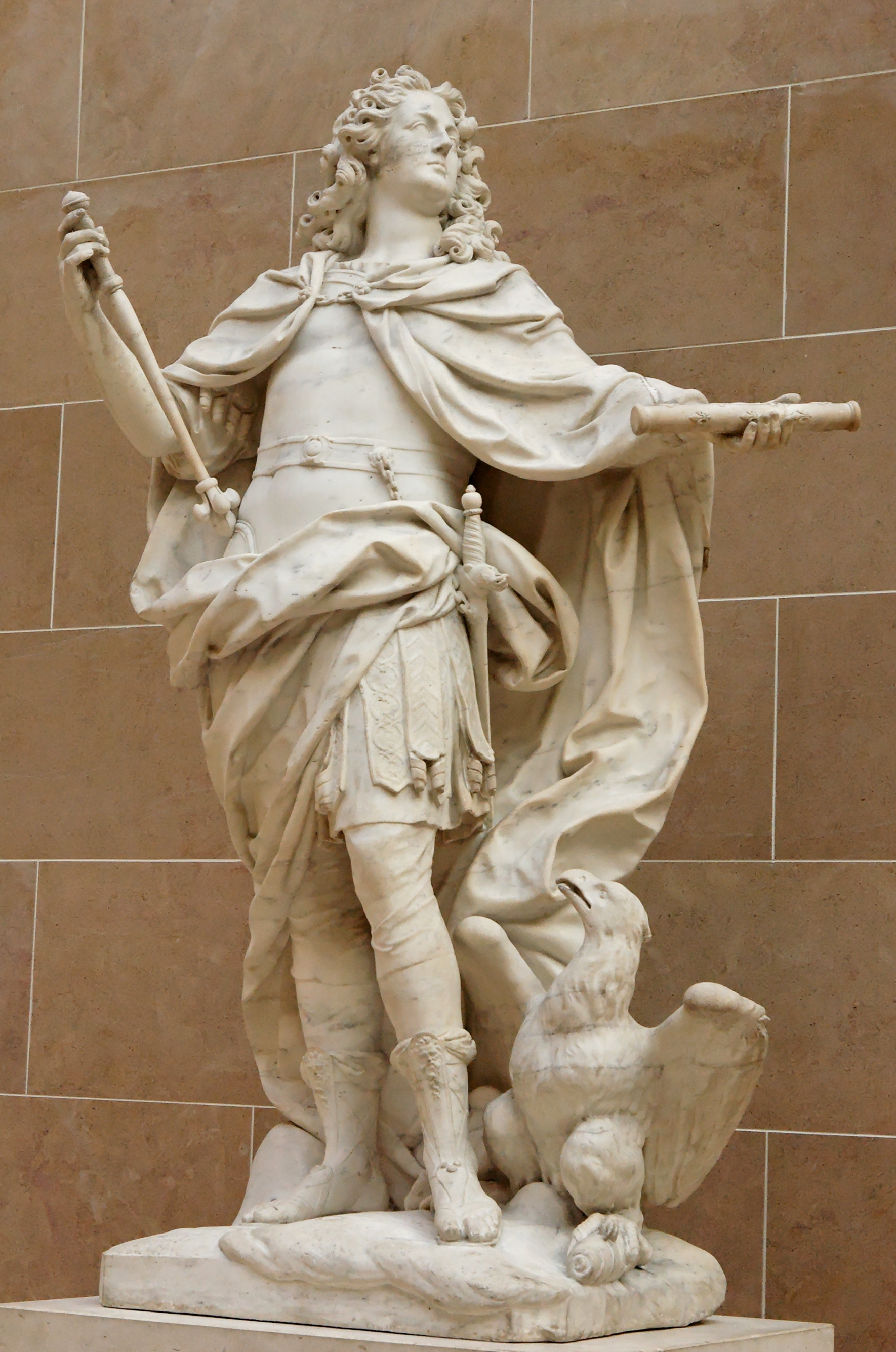
Louis XV as Jupiter by Coustou, the Louvre

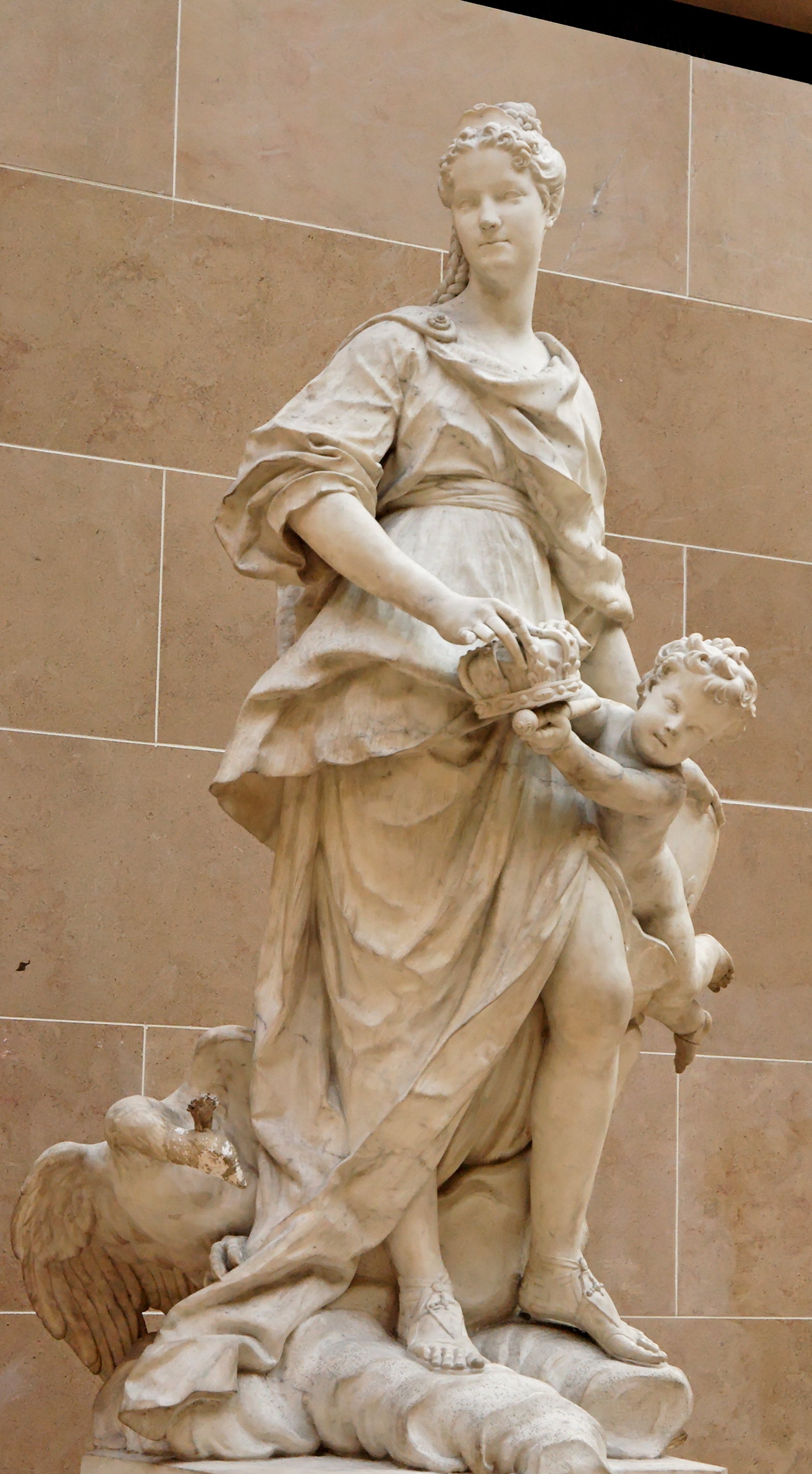
Queen Marie Leszczyńska as Pomone, by Coustou, the Louvre

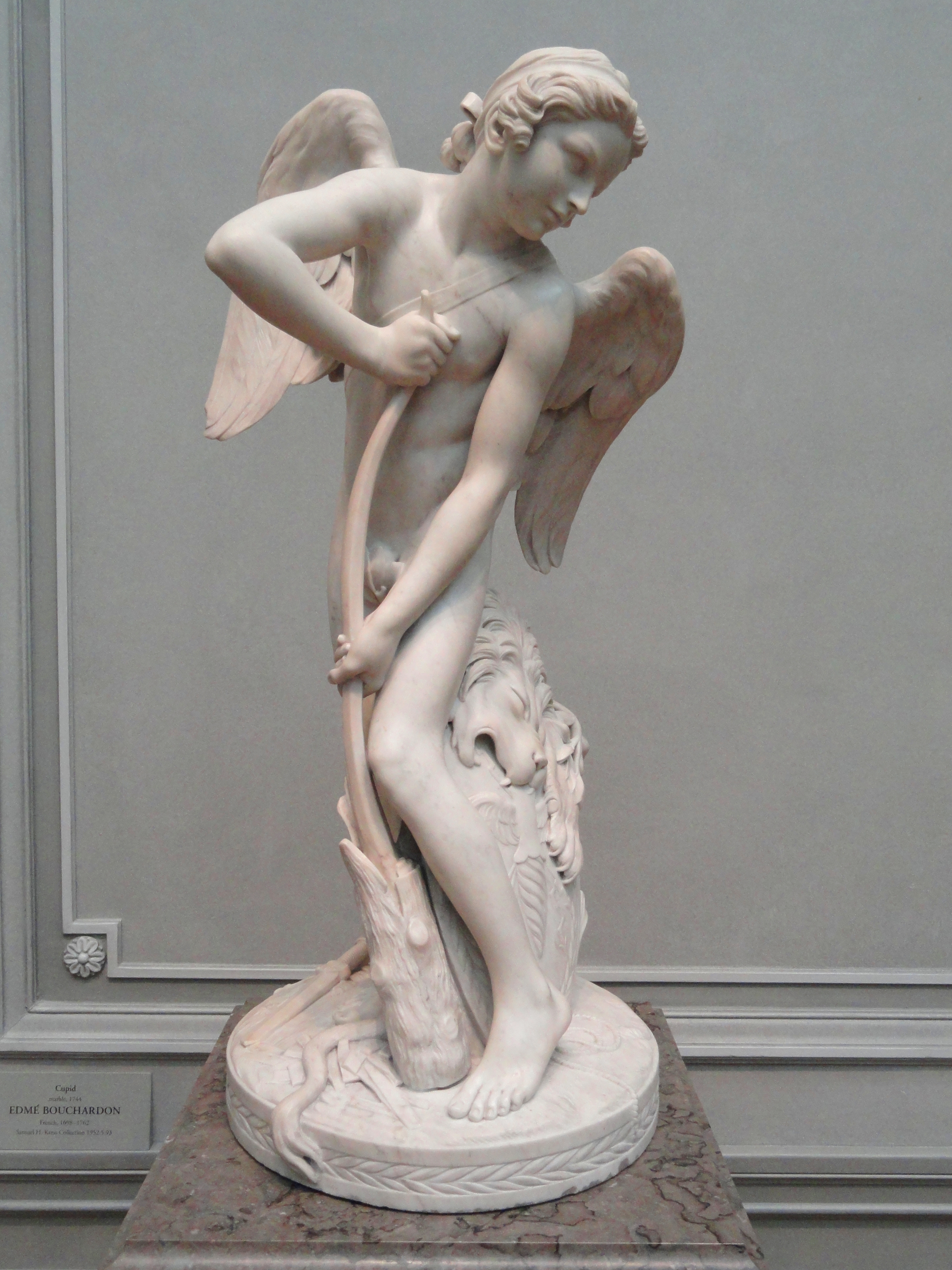
Edmé Bouchardon, Cupid making his bow from the club of Hercules, National Gallery of Art, Washington D.C. (1744)

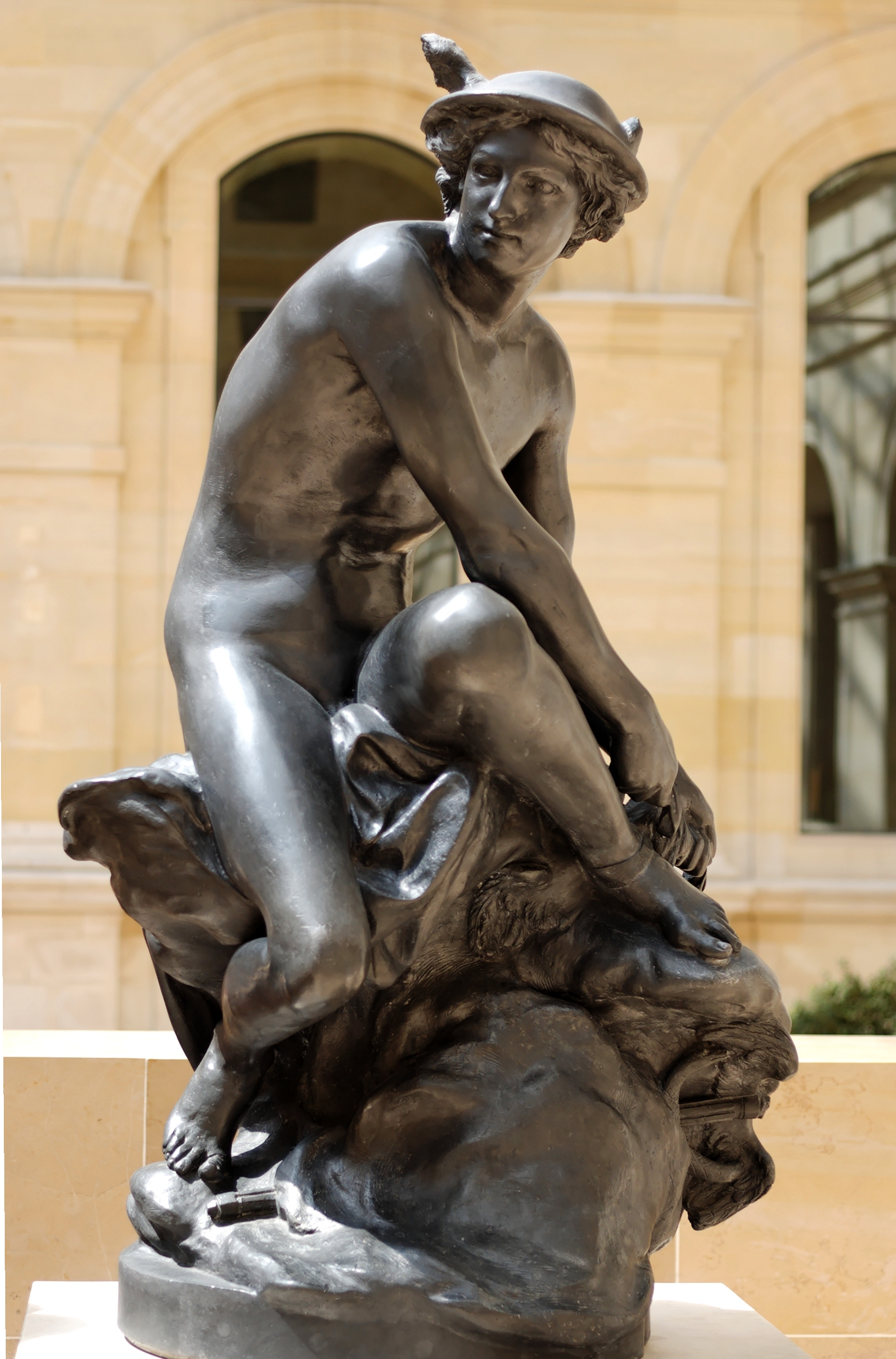
Jean-Baptiste Pigalle, Mercury lacing his winged sandals the Louvre (1745)

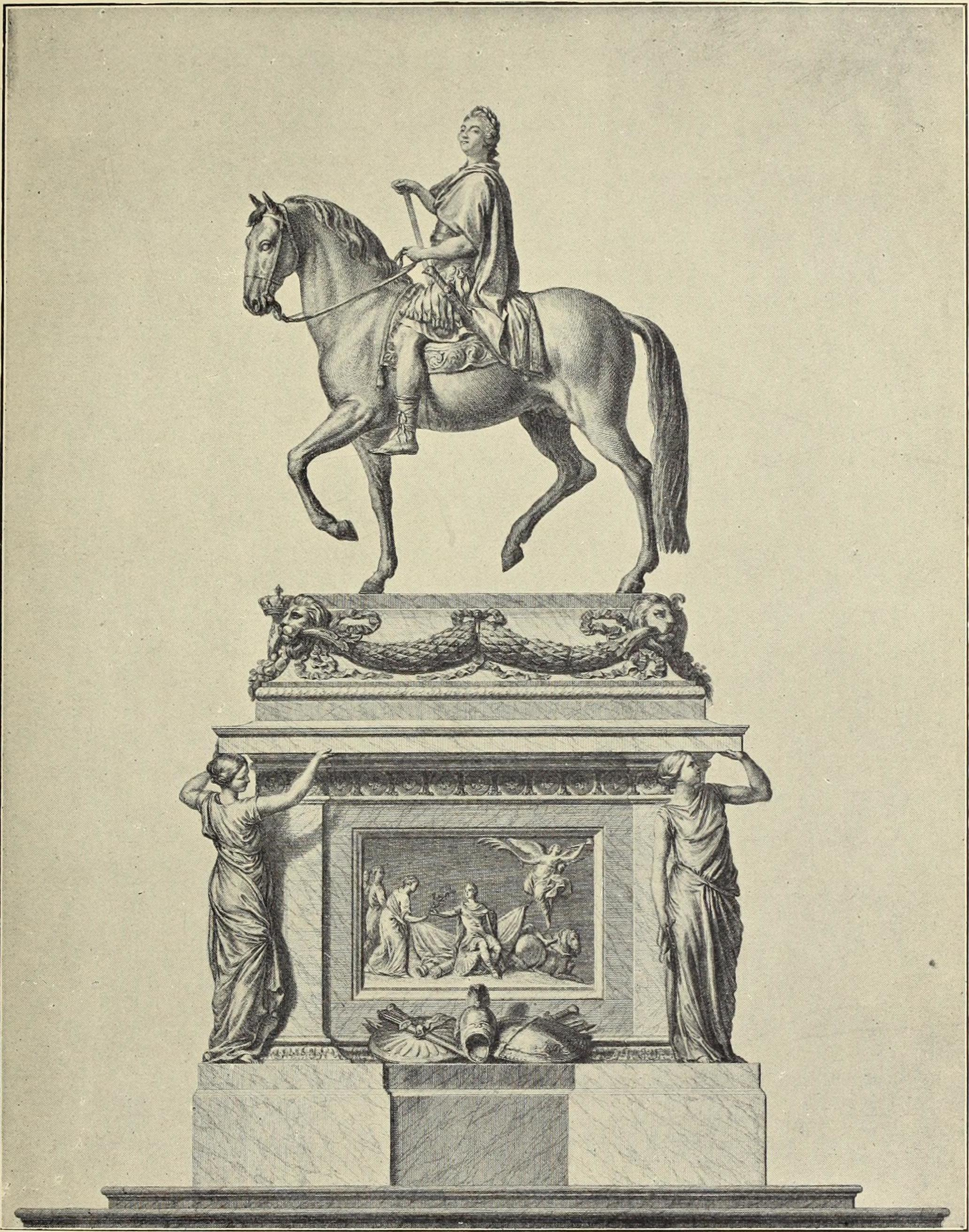
Design by Edmé Bouchardon for statue of the King on Place Louis XV (destroyed)

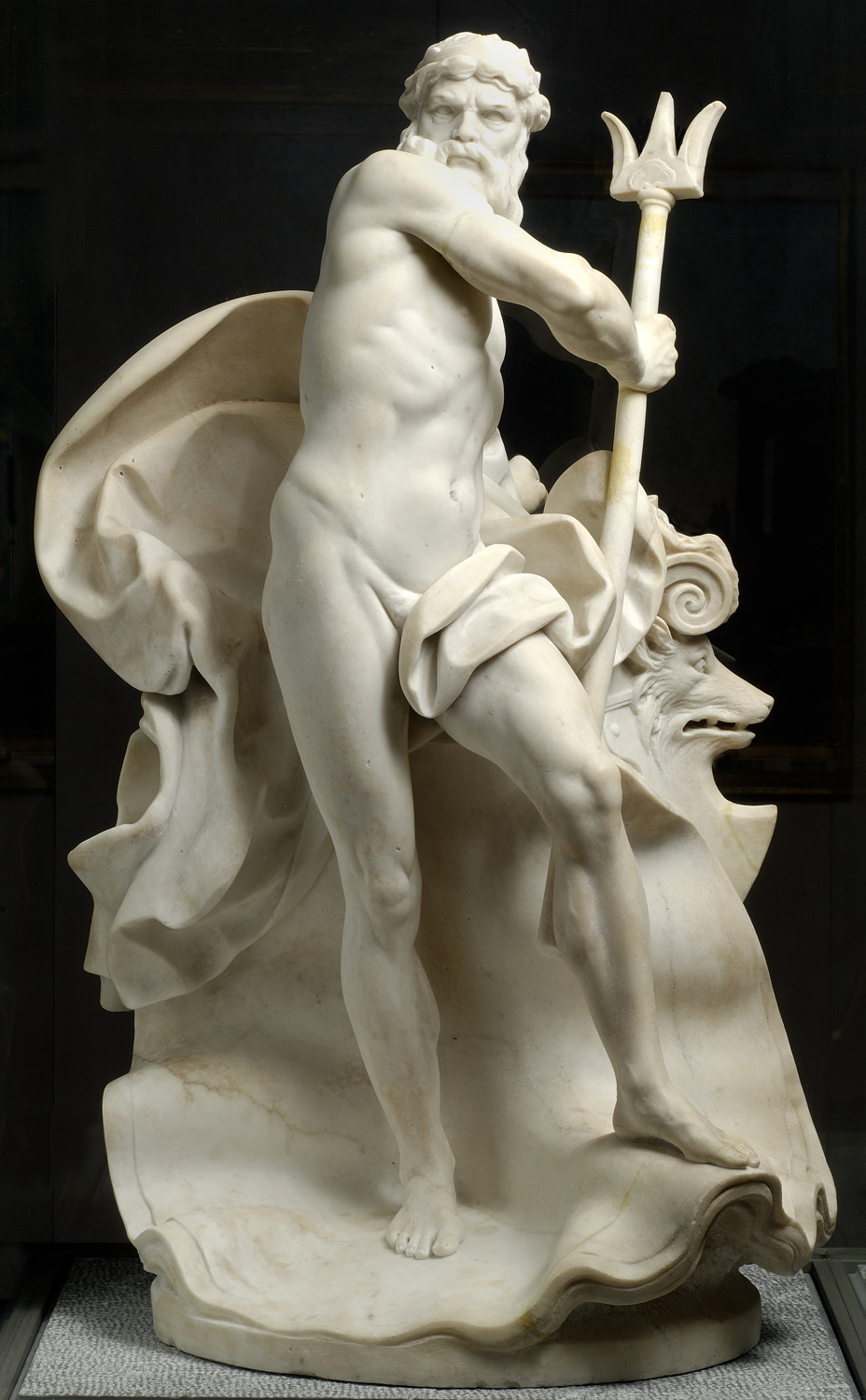
Neptune by Augustin Pajou Museum of Fine Arts of Lyon (1767)

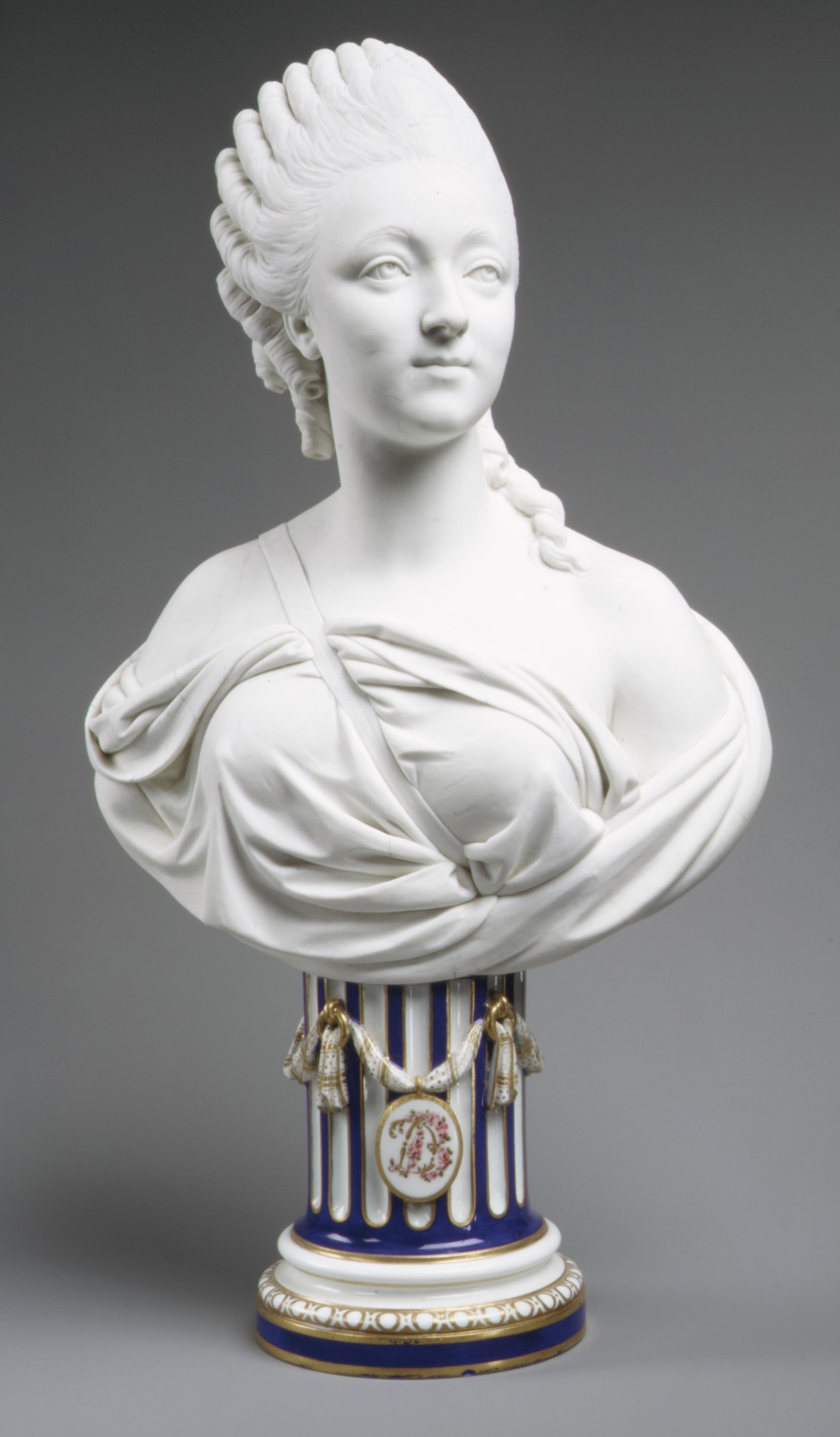
Madame du Barry by Augustin Pajou, the Louvre (1755)

== Urbanism: monumental squares and fountains ==
In the later years of his reign, Louis constructed a major new square in the center of the city, Place Louis XV (now the Place de la Concorde), with a harmonious row of new buildings, designed by Ange-Jacques Gabriel. He built other monumental squares in the centers of Rennes and Bordeaux. He also constructed one monumental fountain in Paris, the Fontaine des Quatre-Saisons, with statuary by Edmé Bouchardon; but it was poorly sited on a narrow street, and while it had an abundance of sculpture, because of the antiquated water supply of Paris, it produced very little water. The fountain was criticized by Voltaire in a letter to Anne Claude de Caylus in 1739, while it was still under construction:

I have no doubt that Bouchardon will make of this fountain a fine piece of architecture; but what kind of fountain has only two faucets where the water porters will come to fill their buckets? This isn't the way fountains are built in Rome to beautify the city. We need to lift ourselves out of taste that is gross and shabby. Fountains should be built in public places, and viewed from all the gates. There isn't a single public place in the vast faubourg Saint-Germain; that makes my blood boil. Paris is like the statue of Nabuchodonosor, partly made of gold and partly made of muck.

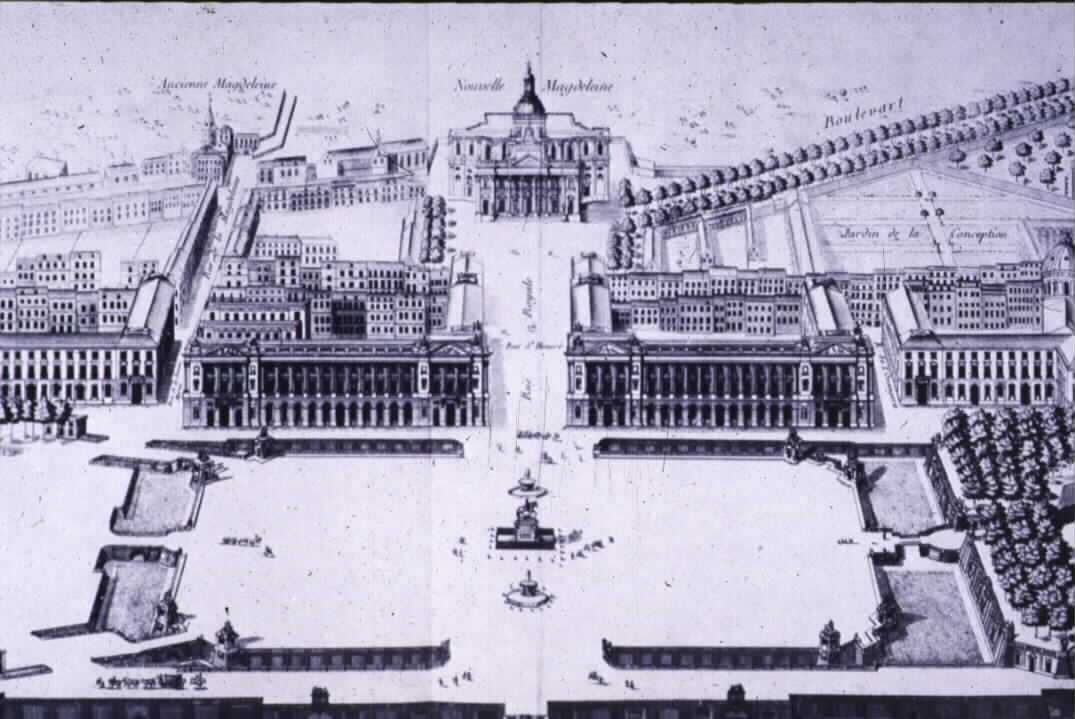
Design for the Place Louis XV by Ange-Jacques Gabriel (1758)

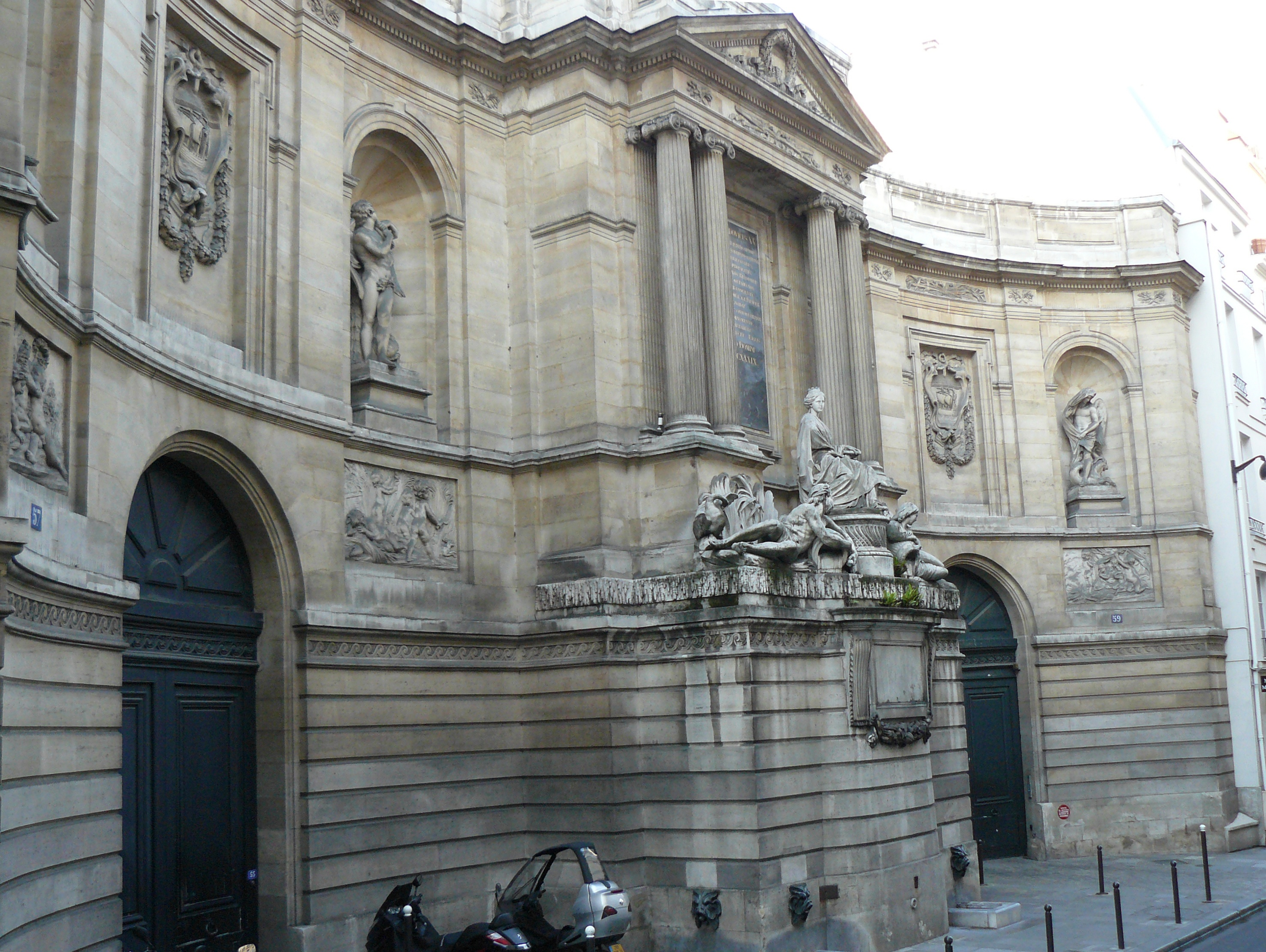
Fontaine des Quatre-Saisons (1739–1745)

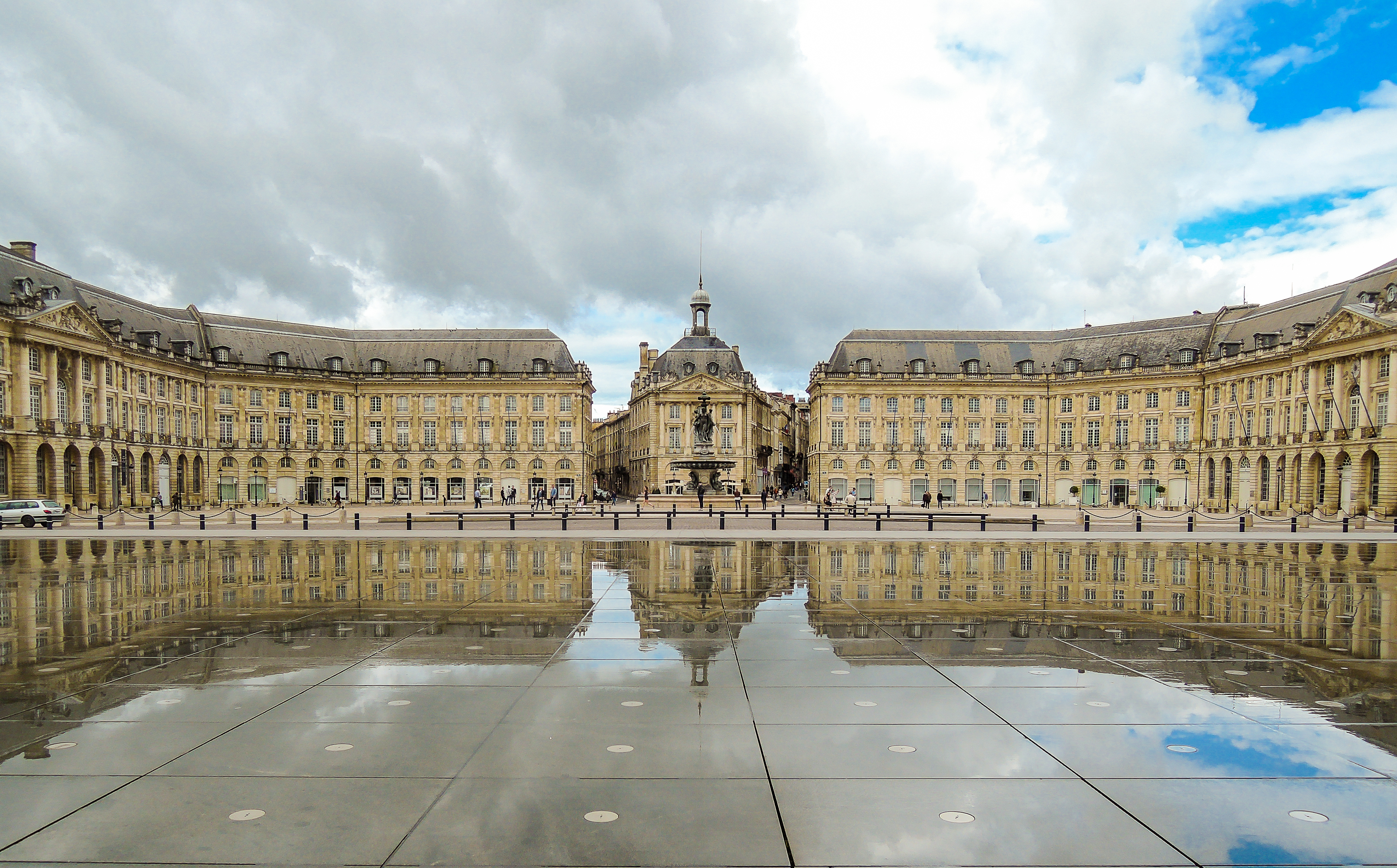
Place de la Bourse in Bordeaux by Ange-Jacques Gabriel (1730–1775)

== See also ==
- Louis period styles
- Neoclassicism in France
- Liège–Aachen Baroque furniture
- Baroque in Prince-Bishopric of Liège

== Bibliography ==
- Ducher, Robert, Caractéristique des Styles, (1988), Flammarion, Paris (In French); ISBN 2-08-011539-1
- Paris et ses fontaines de la Renaissance à nos jours, from the Collection Paris et son Patrimoine, directed by Béatrice de Andia, Délégué Général à l'Action artistique de la Ville de Paris, 1998.
- Louis XV style. (2008). In Encyclopædia Britannica. Retrieved 2 May 2008, from Encyclopædia Britannica Online
