= May (painting) =

Series of paintings in 17th and early 18th century Paris

The Mays were a series of paintings in 17th and early 18th century Paris. They were commissioned by the goldsmiths' guild of Paris to offer to the cathedral of Notre-Dame de Paris in the early days of the month of May. The tradition began in 1630 and one painting was offered each year between then and 1707, with the exception of 1683 and 1694.

== History ==
The tradition of the Mays de Notre-Dame originated in 1449, when the Parisian godsmiths’ guild (the Confrérie des Orfèvres) began offering devotional gifts to Notre-Dame de Paris Cathedral on May 1st, as an annual tribute to the Virgin Mary. These early offerings were relatively modest, consisting of decorated trees, poetic tributes, and small tabernacles. Over the course of the 16th century, the Mays became increasingly elaborate, culminating in 1630 with the establishment of the so-called “grand Mays,” large-scale history paintings typically measuring 3 meters in size. These works were presented annually from 1630 until 1707 (excluding 1683 and 1694) and formed a coherent pictorial cycle, largely illustrating scenes from the Acts of the Apostles. Beyond their decorative function, the Mays served a didactic purpose: in a largely illiterate society, they conveyed biblical narratives visually. These images were often accompanied by an explanatory text, poems, and prayers continuing earlier traditions of literary offerings and guiding their interpretation

The commissioning of each May followed a structured and competitive process that reflected the organisation of the goldsmiths guild. Each year, two masters from the guild (there were 4 of them, each of whom served a 2 year term) selected an artist approximately one year in advance to complete a painting. Artists were required to submit a preparatory sketch, or modello, for approval before executing the final work. The specific subject was ultimately approved by the canons of Notre-Dame to ensure theological appropriateness. The commission generally included the monumental painting itself as well as two smaller reductions (or esquisses) of the work to be presented to the commissioning goldsmiths. These smaller reductions serve as a valuable record for some of the Mays that have otherwise been lost or destroyed.

The presentation of each May was both a civic and religious event. The paintings were formally unveiled on May 1st. Initially displayed in prominent locations near the altar, they were later installed along the pillars of the nave, where they remained accessible to the public. Over time, the accumulation of these works filled much of the cathedral’s interior space and allowed for public viewing of devotional artwork in a time preceding widespread public museums - the Louvre, for instance didn’t open until 1793.

Given their prestigious nature, the Mays attracted many of the leading painters of 17th-century France, including Charles Le Brun, Jean Jouvenet, Eustache Le Sueur, Sébastien Bourdon, Laurent de La Hyre, and Noël Coypel. These artists were central to the development of French classical Baroque painting and were closely connected to royal patronage of Louis XIV and the Royal Academy of Painters and Sculptors (Académie royale de peinture et de sculpture).

The tradition came to an end in 1707, largely due to financial pressures and changing artistic tastes. Unfortunately during the French Revolution in 1793, many of the paintings were seized and dispersed, with some entering museum collections such as the Louvre while others were lost or destroyed. Subsequent restorations of Notre-Dame by Eugène Viollet-le-Duc in the 19th century further scattered the surviving works across France. Today, fifty-three of the original seventy-six paintings remain. Several are known to exist in their reduced formats and by engravings (1653, 1660, 1676, 1677, 1679, 1681, 1685, 1686, 1688, 1690, 1692, 1693, 1696, 1697, 1699, 1700 and 1701) predominantly by Nicolas-Henri Tardieu.

== List of the Mays ==
Image	Year	Painter	Title	Notes	Current location / status	Ref.
	1630	Georges Lallemant	Saints Peter and Paul Climbing Up To The Temple		Saint-Chéron, parish church	
	1631	Pierre-Antoine Lemoine	The Miracle of the Madonna		Lost	
	1632	Aubin Vouet	The Deaths of Ananias and Sapphira		Rouen, musée des Beaux-Arts	
	1633	Georges Lallemant	Saint Stephen Praying Before His Martyrdom		Lost	
	1634	Jacques Blanchard	The Descent of the Holy Spirit	Restorated in 2022	Paris, cathédrale Notre-Dame	
	1635	Laurent de La Hyre	Saint Peter Curing the Sick By His Shadow	Restorated in 2022	Paris, cathédrale Notre-Dame	
	1636	Jacques de Létin	Saint Paul Preaching on the Areopagus		Destroyed in 1870; previously Strasbourg, musée des Beaux-Arts	
	1637	Laurent de La Hyre	The Conversion of saint Paul	Restorated in 2022	Paris, cathédrale Notre-Dame	
	1638	Claude Vignon	The Baptism of Queen Candace's Eunuch		Lost	
	1639	Aubin Vouet	The Centurion Cornelius at Saint Peter's Feet	Restorated in 2022	Paris, cathédrale Notre-Dame	
	1640	Aubin Vouet	The Freeing of Saint Peter		Toulouse, musée des Augustins	
	1641	Nicolas Prévost	The Beheading of Saint James		Lost	
	1642	Charles Poerson	Saint Peter Preaching in Jerusalem	Restorated in 2022	Paris, cathédrale Notre-Dame	
	1643	Sébastien Bourdon	The Crucifixion of Saint Peter	Restorated in 2022	Paris, cathédrale Notre-Dame	
	1644	Michel Corneille l'Ancien	Saint Paul and Saint Barnabas at Lystra		Arras, musée des Beaux-Arts	
	1645	Charles Errard	Saint Paul Regains His Sight		Lost	
	1646	Louis Boullogne	Saint Paul's Miracle at Ephesus		Arras, musée des Beaux-Arts	
	1647	Charles Le Brun	The Crucifixion of Saint Andrew	Restorated in 2022	Paris, cathédrale Notre-Dame	
	1648	Louis Boullogne	The Martyrdom of Saint Simon		Arras, musée des Beaux-Arts	
	1649	Eustache Le Sueur	Saint Paul Preaching at Ephesus		Paris, musée du Louvre	
	1650	Nicolas Loir	Saint Paul Blinding the False Prophet Barjesus and Converting the Proconsul Sergius	Restorated in 2022	Paris, cathédrale Notre-Dame	
	1651	Charles Le Brun	The Stoning of Saint Stephen	Restorated in 2022	Paris, cathédrale Notre-Dame	
	1652	Louis Testelin	Saint Peter Reviving the Widow Tabitha		Arras, musée des Beaux-Arts	
	1653	Charles Poerson	Saint Paul Bitten by a Snake on Malta		Lost	
	1654	Zacharie Heince	The Conversion of Lydia		Lost	
	1655	Louis Testelin	The flagellation of Saint Paul and Saint Silas	Restorated in 2022	Paris, cathédrale Notre-Dame	
	1656	Étienne Villequin	Saint Paul Delivering Agrippa		Lyon, église Saint-Pothin	
	1657	Louis Boullogne	The Beheading of Saint Paul		Paris, musée du Louvre	
	1658	Michel Corneille l'Ancien	Saint Peter at Caesarea		Toulouse, église Saint-Pierre	
	1659	René Dudot	Saint Peter Reviving the Widow Tabitha		Lost	
	1660	Antoine Paillet	The Martyrdom of Saint Bartholomew		Lyon, cathédrale Saint-Jean	
	1661	Noël Coypel	Saint James Being Led to Torture, Curing a Paralysed Man and Embracing His Accuser		Paris, musée du Louvre	
	1662	Daniel Hallé	The Martyrdom of Saint John at the Latin Gate		Clermont-Ferrand, musée d'Art Roger Quillot	
	1663	Thomas Blanchet	The Rapture of Saint Philip		Arras, musée des Beaux-Arts	
	1664	Jérôme Sorlay|	Christ Appears to Saint Peter		Versailles, cathédrale Saint-Louis	
	1665	Zacharie Heince	Saint Peter and Simon the Magician		Lost	
	1666	Nicolas de Plattemontagne	Saint Paul et Silas		Paris, musée du Louvre	
	1667	Jean-Baptiste de Champaigne	Saint Paul's Martyrdom at Lystra		Marseille, musée des Beaux-Arts	
	1668	Claude-François Vignon	Saint Bartholomew Healing the King of Armenia's Daughter		Lost	
	1669	Louis Boullogne	The Ascension		Lost	
	1670	Gabriel Blanchard	Saint André trésaille de joie à la vue de son supplice	Restorated in 2022	Paris, cathédrale Notre-Dame	
	1671	Jean-Baptiste de Cany	The Conversion of Saint Dionysius the Areopagite at Athens		Lost	
	1672	Michel Corneille le Jeune	The Calling of Saint Peter and Saint Andrew		Arras, musée des Beaux-Arts	
	1673	Jean Jouvenet	Jesus Healing a Paralysed Man		Lost (destroyed in 1944 in the chapel of the École militaire de Saint-Cyr)	
	1674	Claude II Audran	The Beheading of Saint John the Baptist		Paris, musée du Louvre	
	1675	René-Antoine Houasse	The Vision of Saint Stephen		Paris, musée du Louvre	
	1676	Michel Ballin	Saint Paul and Saint Barnabas Separate		Lost	
	1677	François Verdier	The Resurrection of Lazarus		Paris, église Saint-Germain-des-Prés	
	1678	Bon Boullogne	Christ Healing a Paralysed Man at the Baths of Bethseda		Arras, musée des Beaux-Arts	
	1679	Jean-Baptiste Corneille	The Freeing of Saint Peter		Lost	
	1680	Antoine Coypel	The Assumption of the Virgin		Mirande, église Sainte-Marie	
	1681	Alexandre Ubelesqui	The Baptism of Christ		Lost	
	1682	Jean Cotelle	The Marriage at Cana		Yssingeaux, église Saint-Pierre	
	1683	no may		no may		
	1684	Charles-François Poërson	Christ Healing the Sick at Gennesaret		Saint-Symphorien-en-Laye, église Notre-Dame	
	1685	Louis de Boullogne	The Centurion at Christ's Feet		Arras, musée des Beaux-Arts	
	1686	Claude Guy Hallé	Jesus Driving the Money-Changers out of the Temple		Arras, musée des Beaux-Arts	
	1687	Louis Chéron	The Prophet Agabus Predicting to Saint Paul What He Would Suffer At Jerusalem	Restorated in 2022	Paris, cathédrale Notre-Dame	
	1688	Guy-Louis Vernansal	Christ Reviving Jairus' Daughter		Arras, musée des Beaux-Arts	
	1689	Louis Chéron	Salome Carrying the Head of John the Baptist		Lost	
	1690	Simon Guillebault	Christ Reviving the Widow of Nain's Son		Larchant, église Saint-Martin	
	1691	Alexandre Ubelesqui	Christ Healing the Sick		Paris, musée du Louvre	
	1692	Arnould de Vuez	The Incredulity of Saint Thomas		Lyon, cathédrale Saint-Jean	
	1693	Joseph Parrocel	Saint John the Baptist Preaching		Arras, musée des Beaux-Arts	
	1694	no may		no may		
	1695	Louis de Boullogne the younger|	Christ and the Samaritan Woman		Wardour Castle, Wiltshire	
	1696	Joseph Christophe	The Miracle of the Loaves		Lost	
	1697	François Marot	Christ Appearing to the Three Marys		Lost	
	1698	Joseph Vivien	The Adoration of the Magi		Lost	
Francois_Tavernier_Reduction_of_1699_May	1699	François Tavernier	The Repentance of Saint Peter	Only reduced version survives	Lost	
	1700	Guy-Louis Vernansal	Christ and the Deaf-Mute Boy Possessed by an Evil Spirit		Lost	
	1701	Étienne Regnault	Christ and the Woman Caught in Adultery		Lost	
	1702	Mathieu Elias	Sceva's Children Attacked by a Demon	Restorated in 2022	Paris, cathédrale Notre-Dame	
	1703	Louis de Silvestre	Saint Peter Curing a Paralysed Man at the Temple Gate		Arras, musée des Beaux-Arts	
	1704	Claude Simpol	Christ in the House of Martha and Mary		Arras, musée des Beaux-Arts	
	1705	Louis Galloche	Saint Paul Departs for Miletus		Paris, musée du Louvre	
	1706	Pierre-Jacques Cazes	The Curing of the Woman with a Flow of Blood		Arras, musée des Beaux-Arts	
	1707	Jacques Courtin	Saint Paul preaching at Troad and Reviving the young Eutychus		Toulouse, cathédrale Saint-Étienne	
