= List of members of the Académie royale de peinture et de sculpture =

This is a partial list of members of the Académie royale de peinture et de sculpture.

- Abraham Bosse (1648)
- Philippe de Champaigne (1648)
- Matthieu van Plattenberg (1648)
- Louis Boullogne (1648)
- Henri Testelin (1650)
- Herman van Swanevelt (1651)
- Jean-Michel Picart (1651)
- Pierre Rabon (1660)
- Nicasius Bernaerts (1663)
- Catherine Duchemin (1663)
- Jean Varin (1665)
- Abraham Genoels (1665)
- Madeleine Boullogne (1669)
- Geneviève Boullogne (1669)
- Sébastien Leclerc (1672)
- Élisabeth Sophie Chéron (1672)
- Adam Frans van der Meulen (1673)
- Jean Jouvenet (1675)
- Antoine Coysevox (1676)
- Joseph Parrocel (1676)
- Anne Strésor (1676)
- Bon Boullogne (1677)
- Henri Gascar (1680)
- Dorothée Massé-Godequin (1680)
- Louis de Boullogne (1681)
- Catherine Perrot (1682)
- Nicolas de Largillière (1686)
- Roger de Piles (1699)
- Jean-Marc Nattier (1703)
- Guillaume Coustou the Elder (1704)
- François Tavernier (1704)
- Jean Raoux (1717)
- Rosalba Carriera (1720)
- Charles-Nicolas Cochin (1720)
- Jacques de Lajoue (1721)
- Margaretha Haverman (1722)
- Jean-Baptiste Pater (1728)
- François Boucher (1731)
- Jean Louis Tocqué (1731)
- Etienne Jeaurat (1733)
- Charles-André van Loo (1735)
- Jean-Baptiste Pigalle (1744)
- Charles-Amédée-Philippe van Loo (1747)
- Marie-Thérèse Reboul (1757)
- Anna Dorothea Therbusch (1767)
- Jean-Baptiste Huet (1769)
- Marie-Suzanne Giroust (1770)
- Anne Vallayer-Coster (1770)
- Augustin de Saint-Aubin (1771)
- Nicolas Pérignon (1775)
- Hendrik Frans de Cort (1779)
- Jacques-Louis David (1780)
- Adélaïde Labille-Guiard (1783)
- Marie Louise Élisabeth Vigée-Lebrun (1783)
- Adolf Ulric Wertmüller (1784)
- Jean-Baptiste Stouf (1785)
- Dominique Vivant (1787)

There were only fifteen women total listed in their registers. Nearing the end of the eighteenth century, Louis XVI decided that no more than four women were allowed to be admitted into the academy at one time with no increase to be considered.
