= Aubin Vouet =

French painter

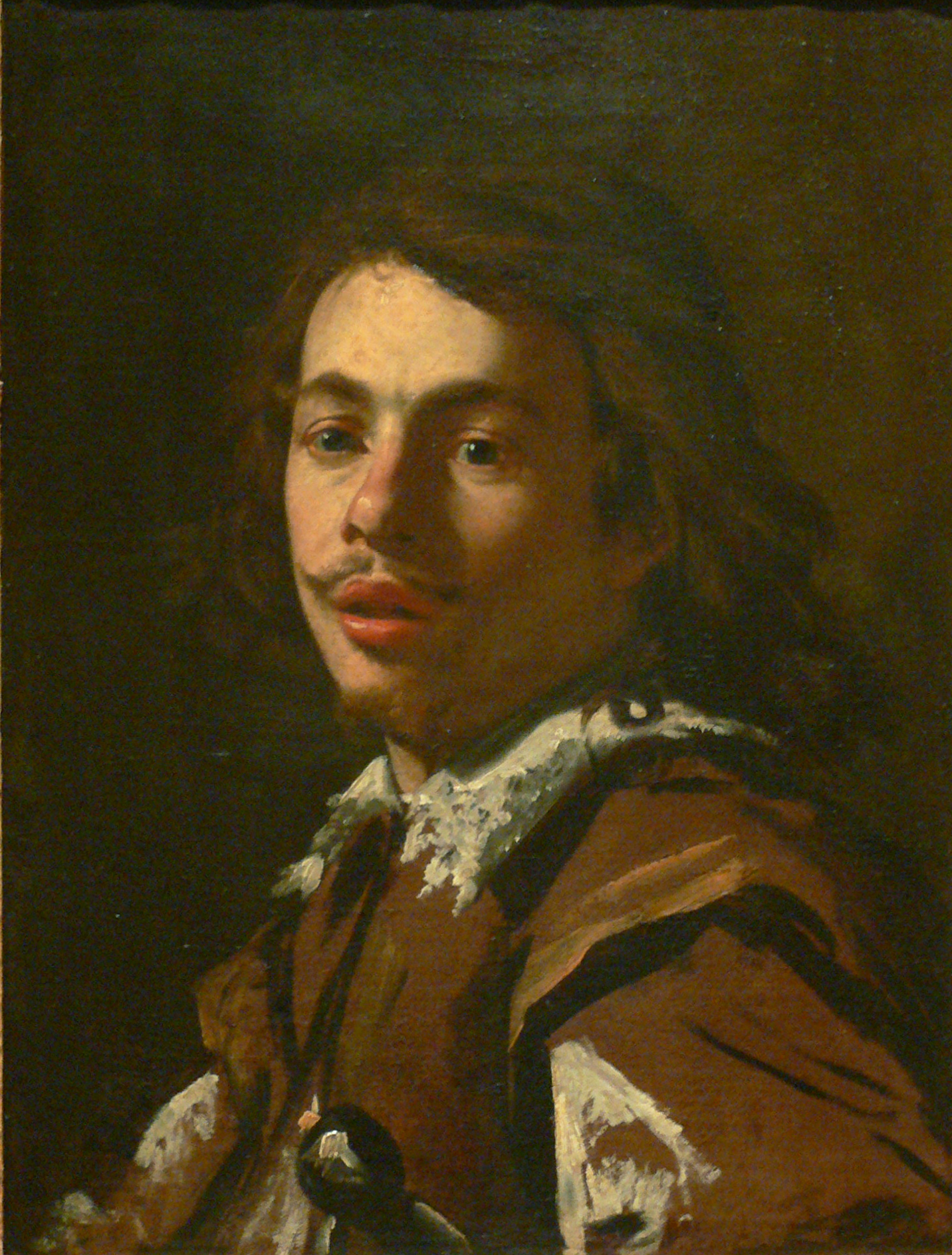
- Simon Vouet, Portrait, said to be of Aubin Vouet (c. 1620), Arles, musée Réattu.)
- Born: 1595
- Died: 1641 (aged 45–46)

Aubin Vouet (French pronunciation: [obɛ̃ vwɛ]; 1595 - 1641) was a French painter, the son of Laurent Vouet and younger brother of Simon Vouet, both also painters.

== Life ==
He joined his brother in Rome six years after Simon had moved there. They were there together around 1619-1620, since in those years they were received into the Stati delle Anime. They both lodged on Vicolo di San Silvestro. In Rome Aubin was strongly influenced by Caravaggio, as can be seen in his early works such as David Holding Goliath's Head, making him one of the Caravaggisti, a group which also included Guido Reni, Nicolas Régnier and Domenico Fetti. However, he quickly returned to France, whereas his brother stayed there a further six years until 1627. In 1621 Aubin was made painter in ordinary to Louis XIII.

Around 1630 he painted two huge canvases for the nave of the chapelle des Pénitents noirs in Toulouse, The Brazen Serpent and The Discovery of the True Cross, though they were both completed by his student Jean Senelle (Meaux, 1605-1671), who had formerly also been a student of Georges Lallemant. In 1634, Aubin Vouet worked on the chapel in the Château-Vieux (Old Castle) at Saint-Germain-en-Laye. At around the same time he was also active in his brother Simon's Parisian school (notably alongside François Tortebat, Michel Dorigny, Michel Corneille l'Ancien, Nicolas Chaperon, Charles Poërson) and helped complete some of Simon's paintings. Aubin's later style and compositions were similar to Simon's, painting draped figures in bright colours to break up a scene, often as a curve within a triangle and with figures raised above each other, such as the observer in The Centurion Cornelius Kneeling Before Saint Peter, painted as a May for Notre-Dame de Paris and now in the chapelle Saint-Pierre.

== Works ==
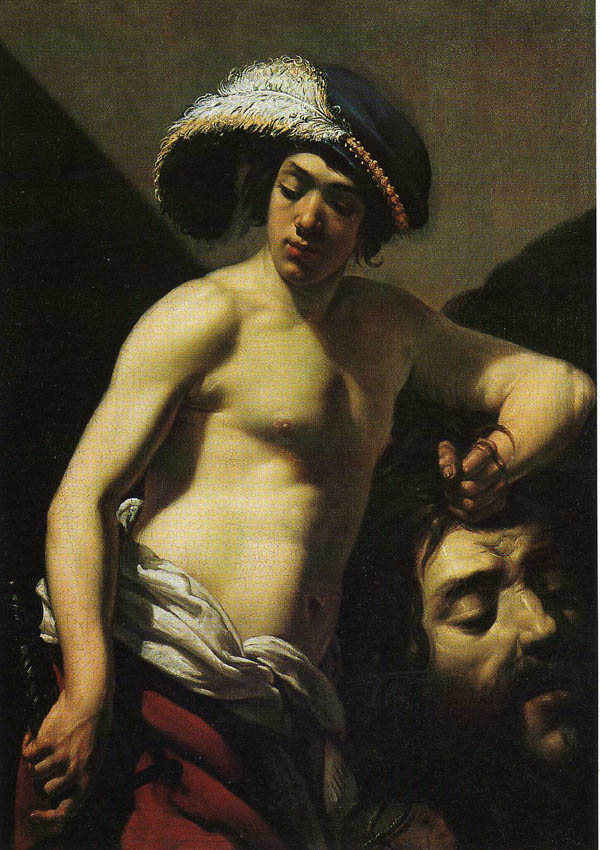
David Holding Goliath's Head, oil on canvas, musée des beaux-arts de Bordeaux.

- David Holding Goliath's Head, musée des beaux-arts de Bordeaux.
- The Brazen Serpent, c 1630, musée des Augustins, Toulouse.
- The Discovery of the True Cross, c 1630, musée des Augustins, Toulouse.
- The Freeing of Saint Peter, musée des Augustins, Toulouse.
- The Death of Ananias and Saphira, 1632, musée des beaux-arts de Rouen.
- The Hunt of Meleager, musée des beaux-arts de Rennes.
- The Centurion Cornelius Kneeling Before Saint Peter, 1639, chapelle Saint Pierre, cathédrale Notre-Dame de Paris.
- Christ on the Mount of Olives, 1640
- Lamentation over the Dead Christ
- Allegory of Abundance
- Saint Catherine of Alexandria
