= Gabriel Blanchard =

French painter

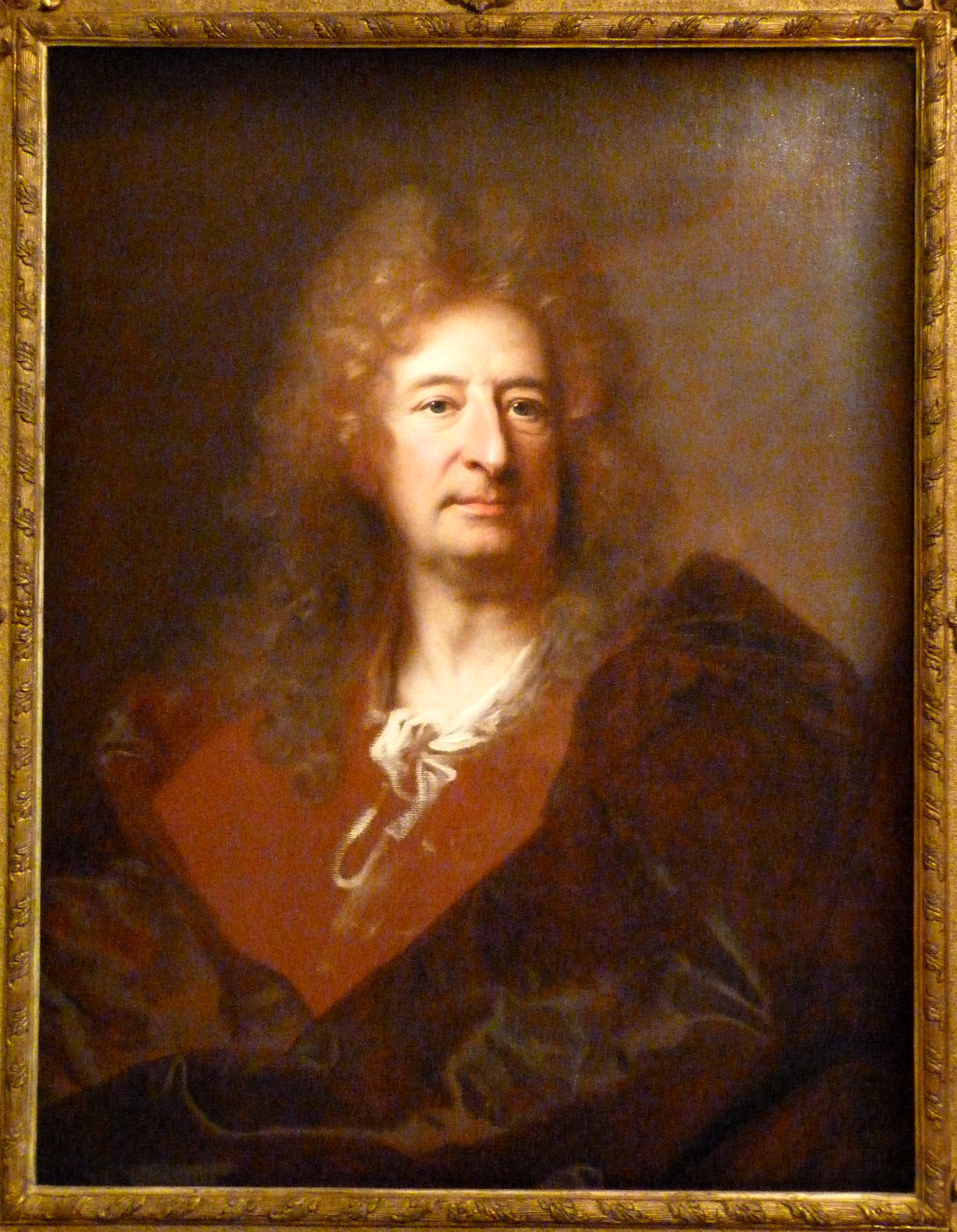
Portrait by Hyacinthe Rigaud, c. 1690

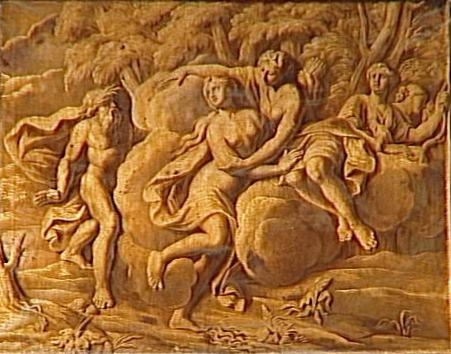
Diane protecting Arephuse against the Alphee River, a 1672 painting in the Salon de Diane, one of the Grand appartement du roi in the Palace of Versailles.

Gabriel Blanchard, known as Blanchard Le Neveu, (1630–1704) the only son of Jacques Blanchard, was born in Paris, and studied under his uncle, Jean Baptiste Blanchard. He was, in 1668, elected Academician on the merits of an allegorical painting of the 'Birth of Louis XIV,' now at Versailles; but his most successful work was a picture of 'St. Andrew,' which he painted as part of the series The Mays for the Parisian Goldsmiths' Guild. He became keeper of the royal collection, and successively assistant professor, professor, and, in 1699, treasurer of the Academy. He died in 1704. Two of his sons, Nicolas and Philippe Thomas, were likewise painters.
