= Étienne Villequin =

French painter

Etienne Villequin (3 May 1619 - 15 December 1688) was a French painter and engraver.

== Life ==
Few details of his life are known. He was born in Ferrières-en-Brie and received into the Academie royale de peinture et de sculpture on 21 April 1663 and painted the 1656 May for Notre Dame, Saint Paul Preaching Before Agrippa. The Louvre also holds a painting by him, Jesus Healing the Blind at Jericho. Nicolas Pitou engraved a Holy Family by Villequin, whilst Jean Boulanger engraved Villequin's Saint Roch and His Dog. He died in Paris.

== Bibliography ==
- A monsieur Villequin, excellent peintre, épltre. Blois, imp. d'Alexis Moitte (1669) in-4» de 4 pages. Biblioth. mazarine, recueil vert, 4° a B. 18.
- Tome 2 Robert Dumesnil, Tome VIII p. 259 (1 pièce)
- Mariette Abecedario, tome VI. p. 82 – Mémoires inédits sur les artistes français (note par Lépicié), tome I p. 353.
