= François Tavernier =

French Baroque Painter

François Tavernier (1659–1725) was a French painter, academician, and historian of the Royal Academy of Painters and Sculptors (Académie royale de peinture et de sculpture) of France. Though largely lost to history, he is nonetheless remembered for his 1699 May painting (now lost) of Notre-Dame de Paris cathedral.

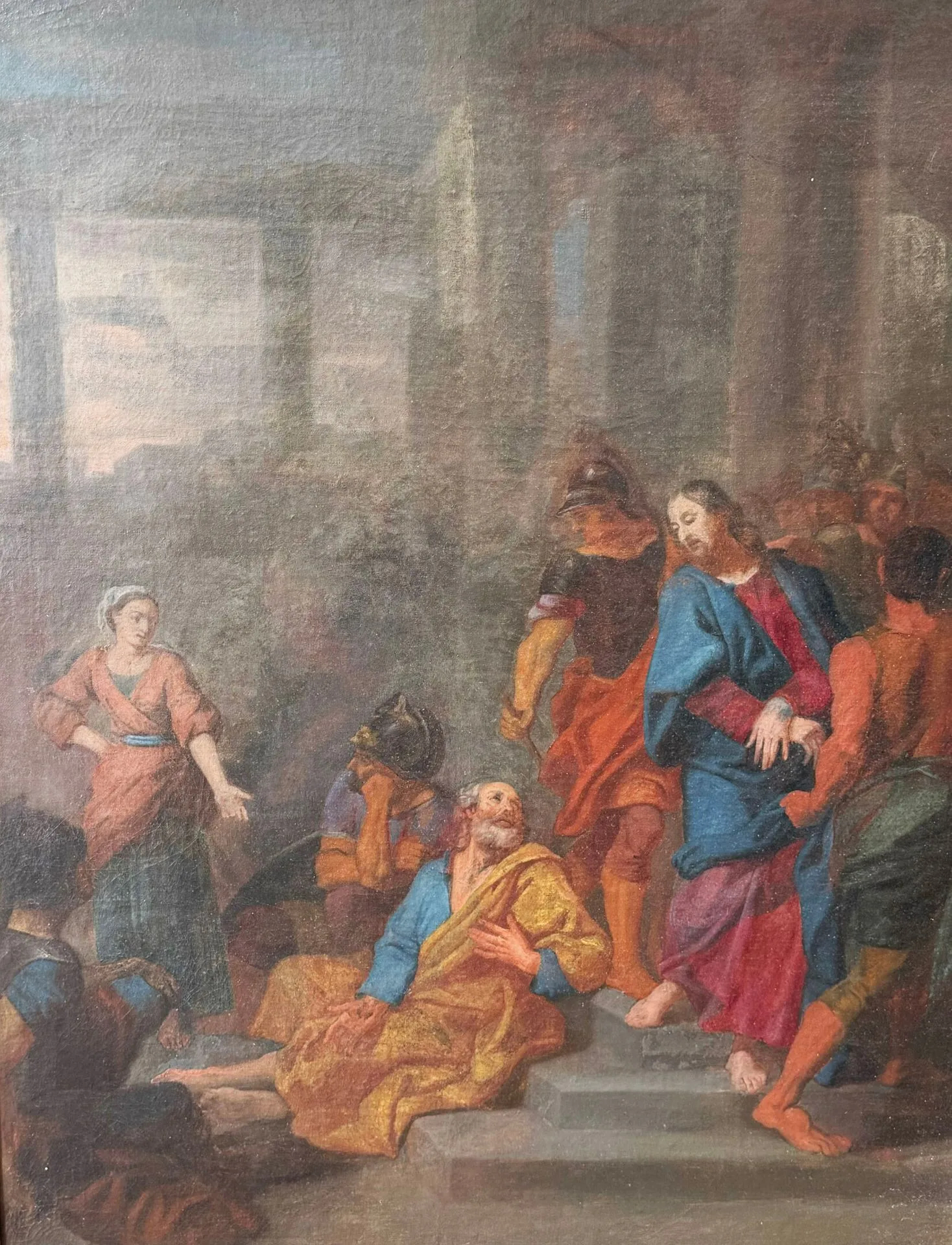
Francois Tavernier, reduction (sketch) of the May of Notre-Dame de Paris cathedral 1699

Most of the information about Tavernier comes from a biography written of him on the day after his death. In his biography Dussieux writes that Tavernier was born into a privileged upbringing with a strong literary and artistic education early in life. His father, a royal carpenter, died while Tavernier was still young, leaving behind 137000 livres to Tavernier's mother, who spared no expense in educating and training François.

Around 1679, Tavernier traveled to Italy to study at the French Academy in Rome. Established in 1666 by Louis XIV as a branch of the Royal Academy of Painting and Sculpture in Paris, this academy was designed to bring talented French artists such as Tavernier to Rome and immerse them in classical art. Tavernier's time in Rome was a formative experience that helped shape his artistic direction. Upon returning from this trip, he enrolled as a student with Jean Jouvenet.

Tavernier was admitted to the Académie Royale de Peinture et de Sculpture in 1704 as a history painter, presenting The Abduction of Deianira as his reception piece. That same year, he exhibited at the Salon, showing The Abduction of Deianira along with two other history paintings: The Birth of Romulus and Neptune on the Waters, all of which are now lost.

Today, Tavernier's painted oeuvre has almost entirely disappeared. An altarpiece in the church of Saint-Nicolas-du-Chardonnet, Paris (which was originally commissioned for the high altar of the Collège des Bernardins) is one possible work though, it has also been attributed to Adrien Sacquespee. Tavernier is also known to have executed a series of twelve paintings for the Abbey of Longpont, commissioned by Cardinal César d'Estrées, however none of these are known to have survived. A recently discovered sketch/reduction of the 1699 May (private collection, Canada) is the only surviving work confidently attributed to his hand.

Tavernier's commission of the 1699 May appears to be the most significant work of his career as a painter. The Mays of Notre Dame were a series of large annual paintings commissioned by the Parisian goldsmiths’ guild from 1630 to 1707. In 1699, Tavernier was selected by goldsmiths Jean-André Picart and Henri Cain to complete the work, which according to tradition would be unveiled along with an accompanying explanation, sonnet and prayer on May 1st (hence the title of "May"). Tavernier's work The Repentance of Saint Peter: Christ Turning His Gaze upon Saint Peter after the Denial was lost during the French Revolution, but its composition is preserved through an engraving by Nicolas-Henri Tardieu (1736) as well as a reduced version of the painting which would have been one of two smaller versions traditionally presented to the commissioning goldsmiths.

Engraving of Francois Tavernier 1699 May de Notre Dame Cathedral by Tardieu

Beyond his work as a painter, Tavernier played a notable role within the Académie Royale. In 1714, he was appointed historiographer, and he became professor in 1724. He also served as secrétaire perpétuel (perpetual secretary), though contemporaries judged him more diligent than distinguished in this administrative role. Nevertheless, a contemporary note describes him as possessing “a very lively mind full of wit,” combined with extensive knowledge of sacred and profane history, literature, and theatre, supported by an exceptional memory that made his conversation particularly engaging.

In 1725, shortly before his death, Tavernier authored a manuscript titled Histoire de l’établissement de l’Académie, contributing to the institutional memory of the academy. His name is frequently mentioned in Academie minutes from the period.

From vital records we can ascertain that Tavernier lived in Paris on the rue Gille-le-Cœur and left behind a family, including two sons: François, a surgeon, and Paul François, a bourgeois. His wife, Marie-Thérèse Dole, was the daughter of the surgeon François Daly.

He died in Paris on 10 September 1725 at the age of 66 and was buried the following day at the Saint-André-des-Arts cemetery that once existed on Rue Suger in the 6th arrondissement. The remains interred here were moved to the Catacombs of Paris in the 1800s, and the site no longer exists. Handwritten records of his death describe him as “Peintre du Roy, Professeur et Secrétaire Perpétuel de l’Académie Royale de Peinture et de Sculpture.”
