= Jacques-François Courtin =

French painter

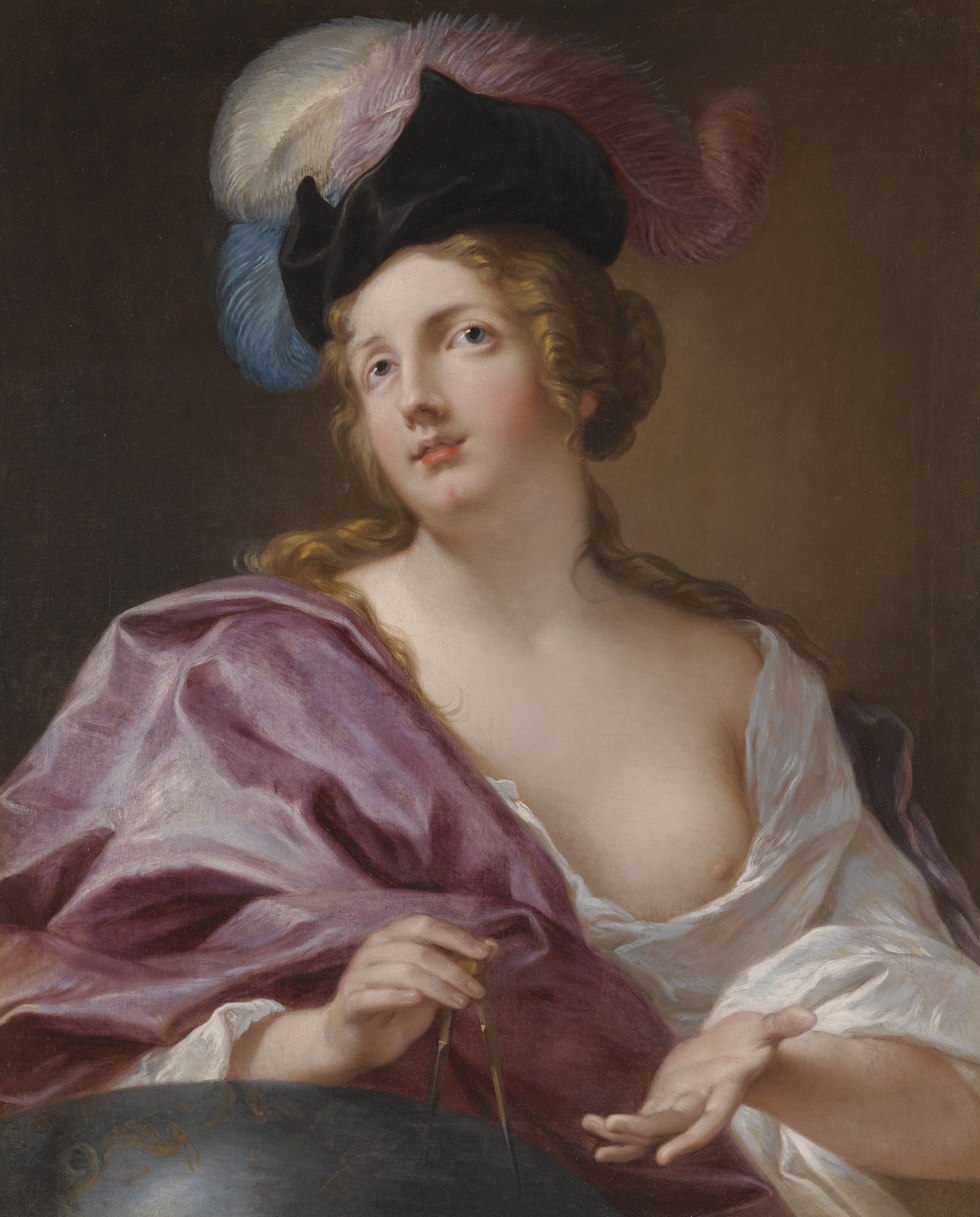
Female astronomer

Jacques François Courtin (1672–1752) was a French painter who was particularly adept at translating genre scenes based on Dutch Golden Age examples into a contemporary setting through the use of staging and costume. He was one of the most popular genre painters of the late 17th and early 18th centuries.

== Life ==
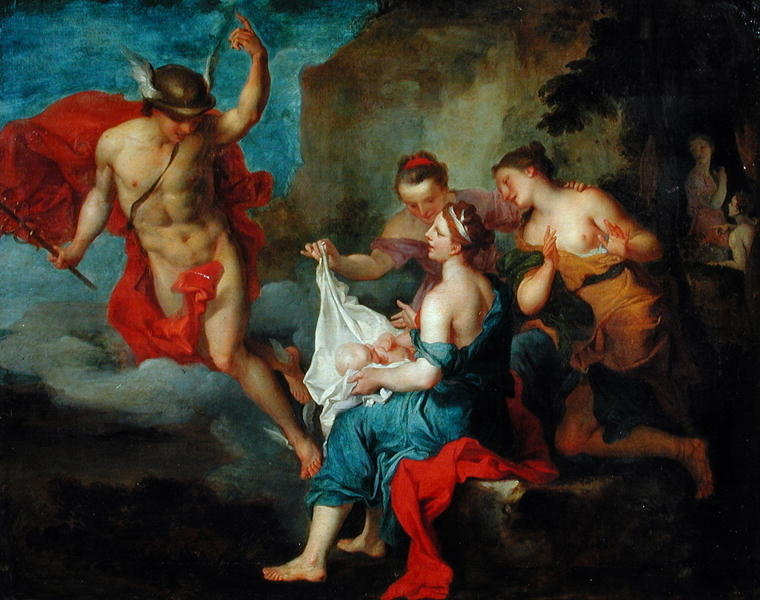
Bacchus Delivered to the Nymphs of Nysa

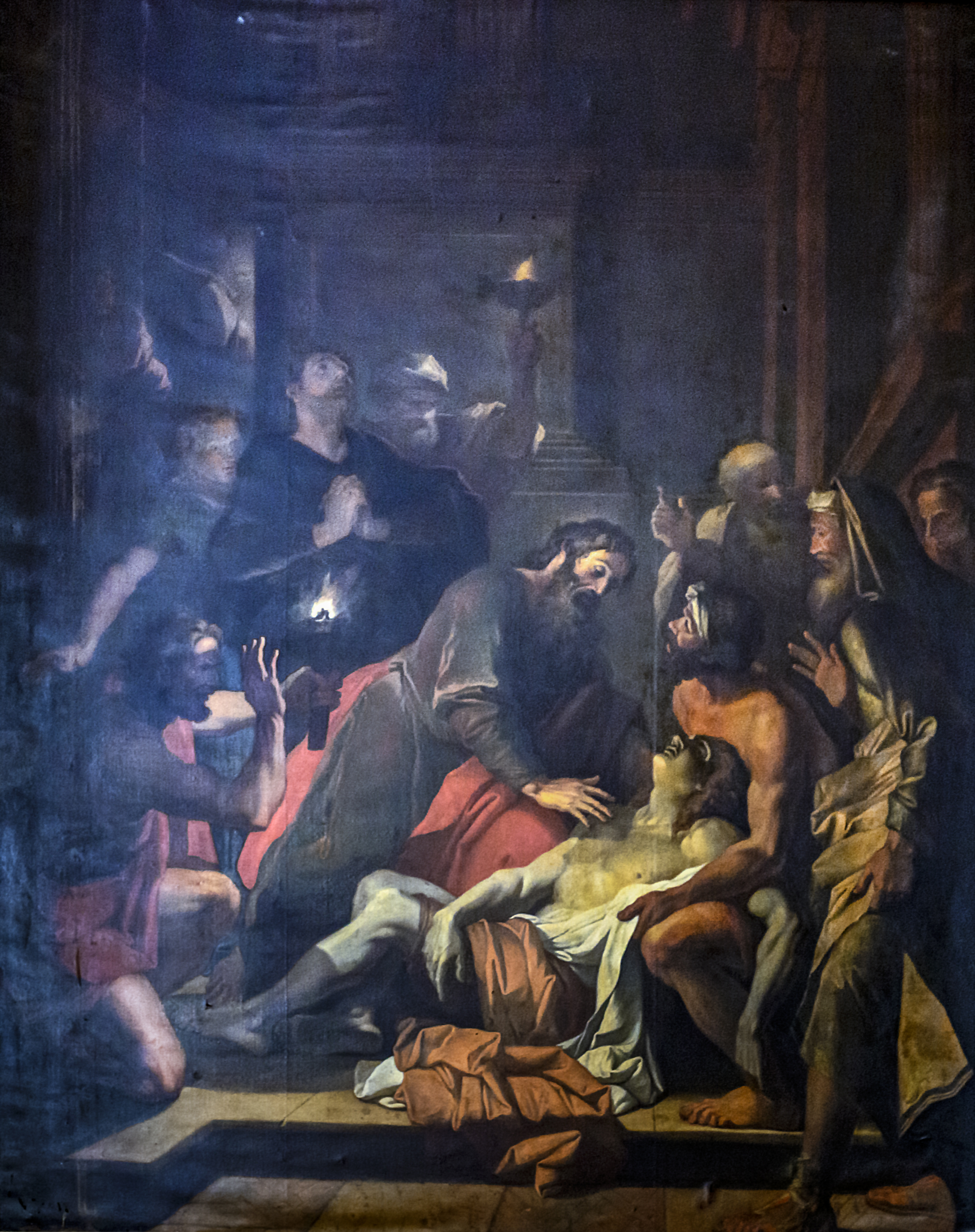
Saint Paul bringing Eutychus back to life

Jacques François Courtin was born in Sens in 1672. He was a pupil of Louis de Boullogne, and painted the final 'May' offered to the cathedral of Notre-Dame by the goldsmiths of Paris in 1707, the subject of which was 'St. Paul preaching at Troas'. He died in Paris in 1752.

His patrons included the royal family as well as many of the important collectors in Paris.
