= Alexandre Ubeleski =

French painter

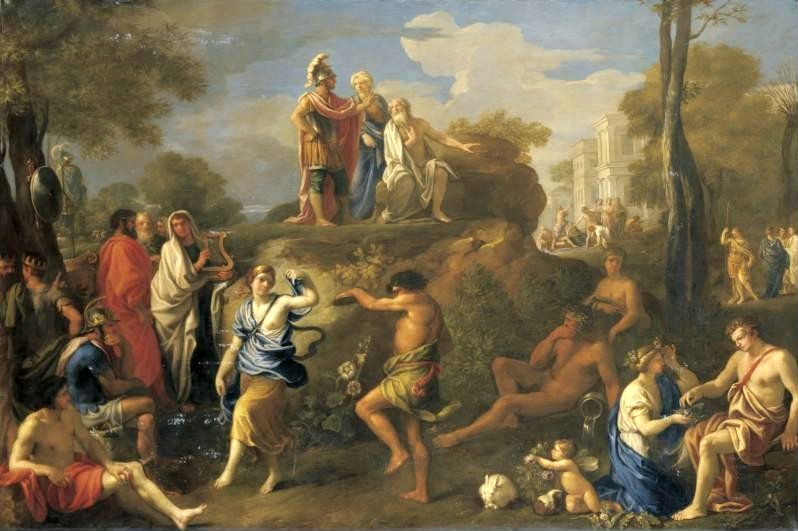
Ubeleski's Aeneas and Anchises

Alexandre Ubeleski (sometimes Ubelesqui or Ubielesqui; 1649–1718) was a French painter. Ubeleski was born in Paris. (Note: Some sources give his date of birth as 1628.) He was a pupil of Charles Lebrun, and completed his studies in Rome, where he became a member of the Academy, and where he painted the dome of a chapel in Santa Maria in Transpontina.

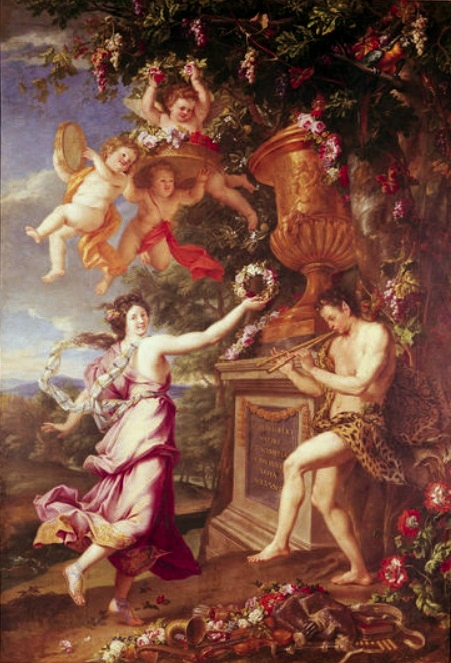
Danse d'une nymphe et d'un satyre, Arras, musée des Beaux-Arts

On his return to France he was patronized by the Court, became a member of the French Academy in 1682, and Professor in 1695. He died in Paris, April 21, 1718. (Note: Some sources give his date of death as 1715.)
