= Guy-Louis Vernansal =

French painter

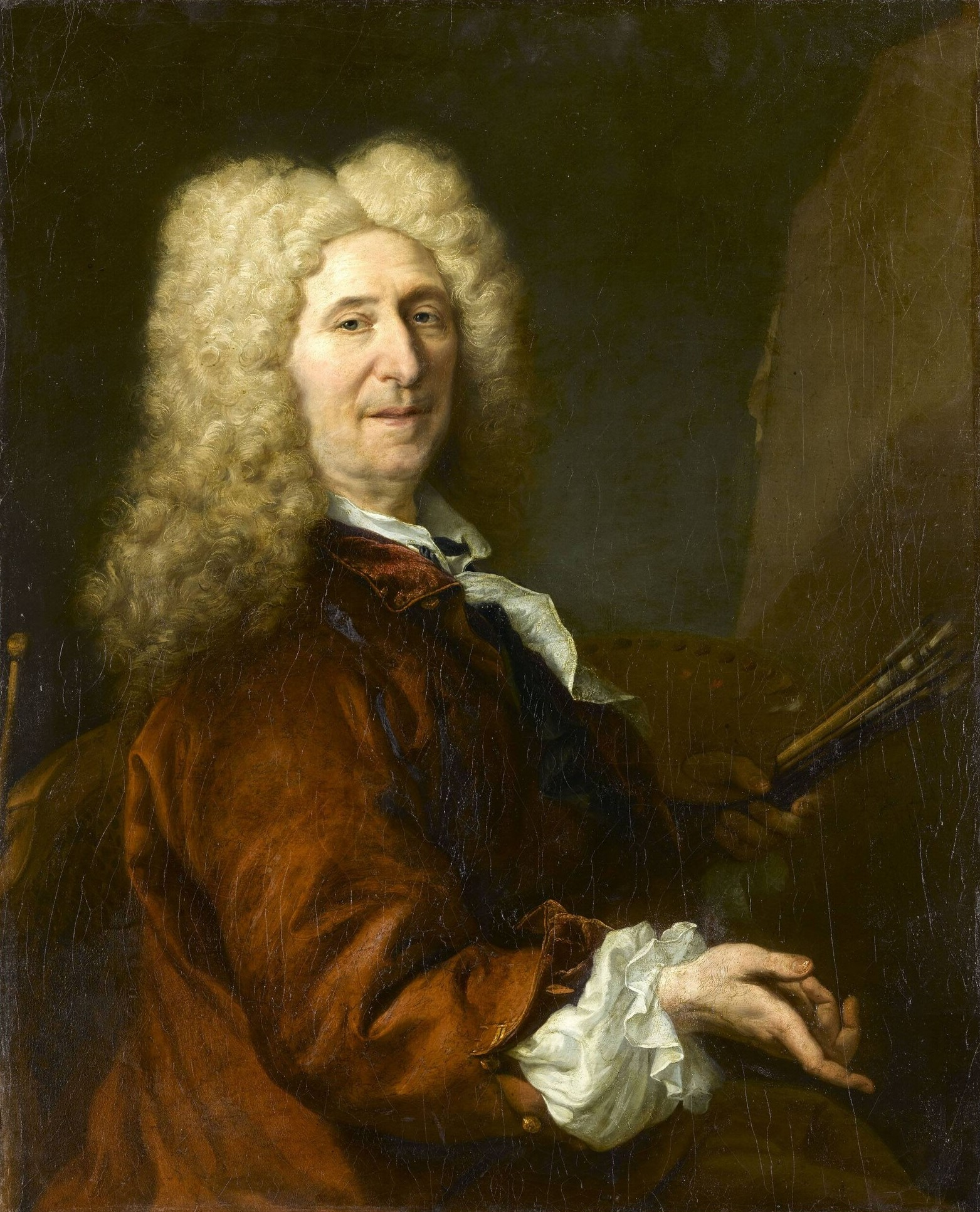
Portrait by Pierre Lebouteux, 1728

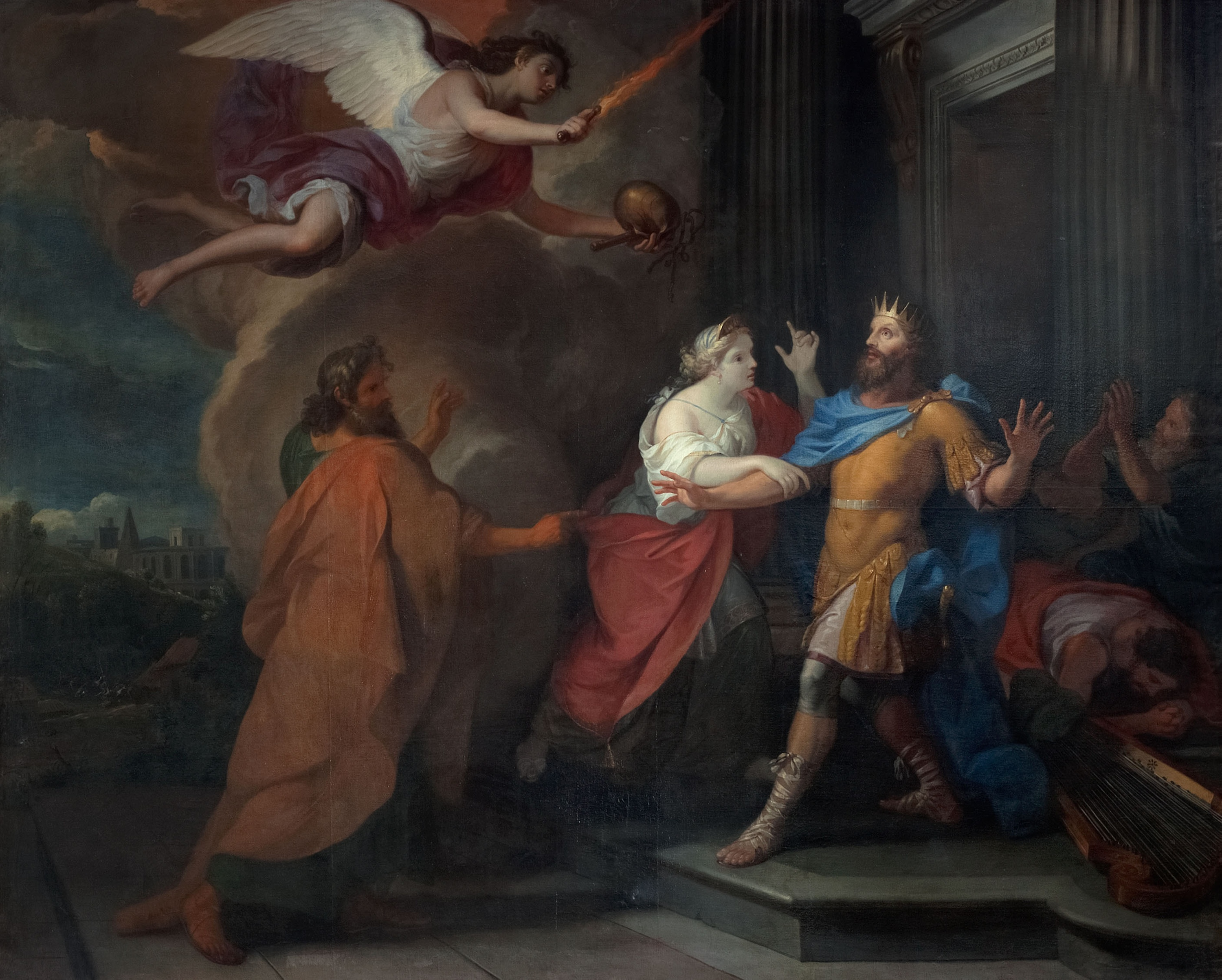
The Plague in the Reign of David

Guy-Louis Vernansal (1648–1729) was a French painter. He studied under Charles Le Brun and produced tapestry designs for the Gobelins and Beauvais manufactories. He was admitted to the Académie royale de peinture et de sculpture in 1687, though he spent much of his life in Rome in the Papal States and also in Padua.
