= Zacharie Heince =

French painter and engraver

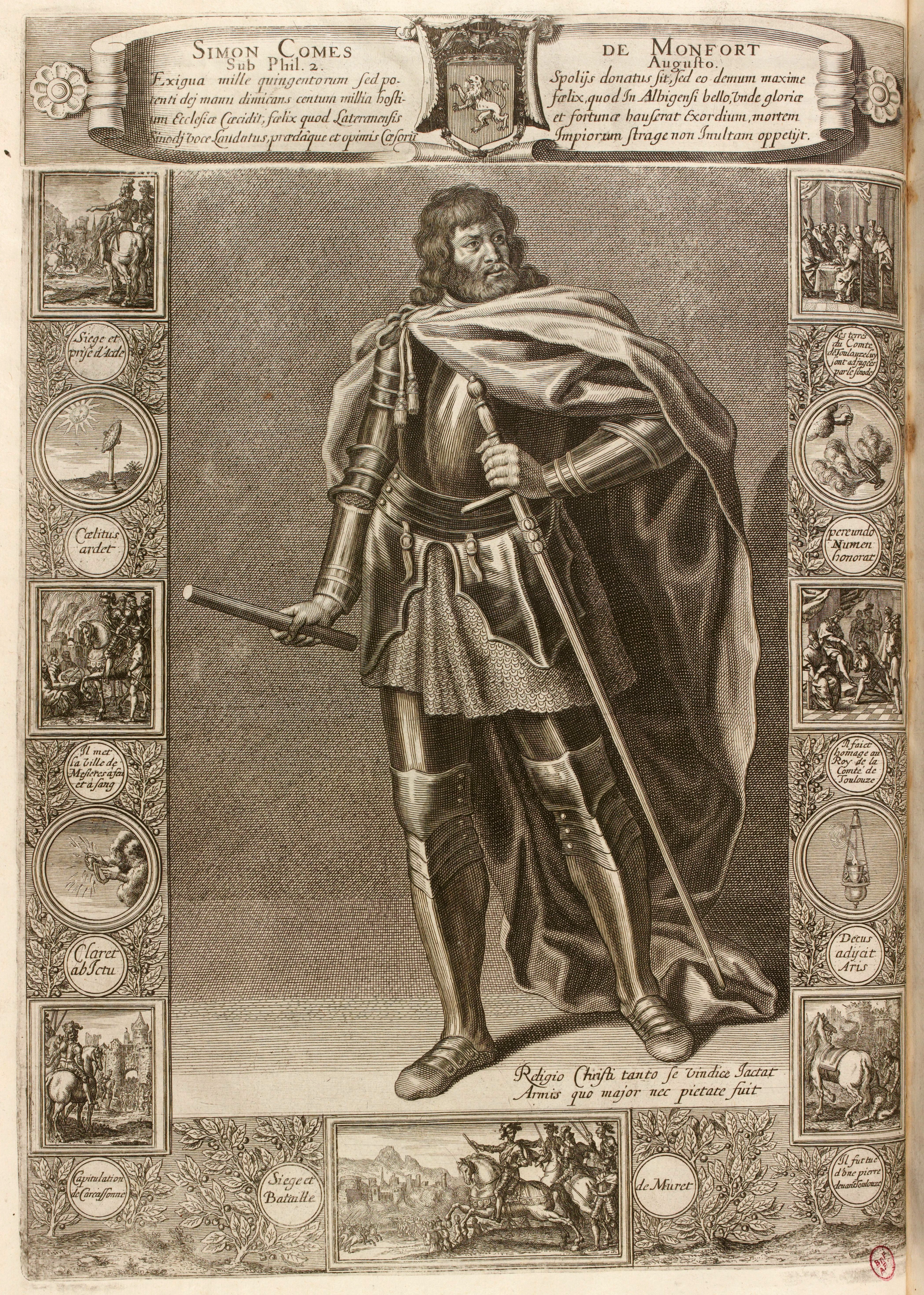
Simon IV de Montfort engraving by Zacharie Heinse (1690)

Zacharie Heince (1611, in Paris – 22 June 1669, in Paris) was a well known French painter and engraver of Swiss origin. He drew portraits of the plenipotentiaries negotiating the peace of Münster engraved by F. Bignon (33 plates plus a frontispiece, 1648), and the Illustrious Frenchmen Painted in the Gallery of the Palais Richelieu (27 plates engraved).
