= Antoine Paillet =

French painter (1626–1701)

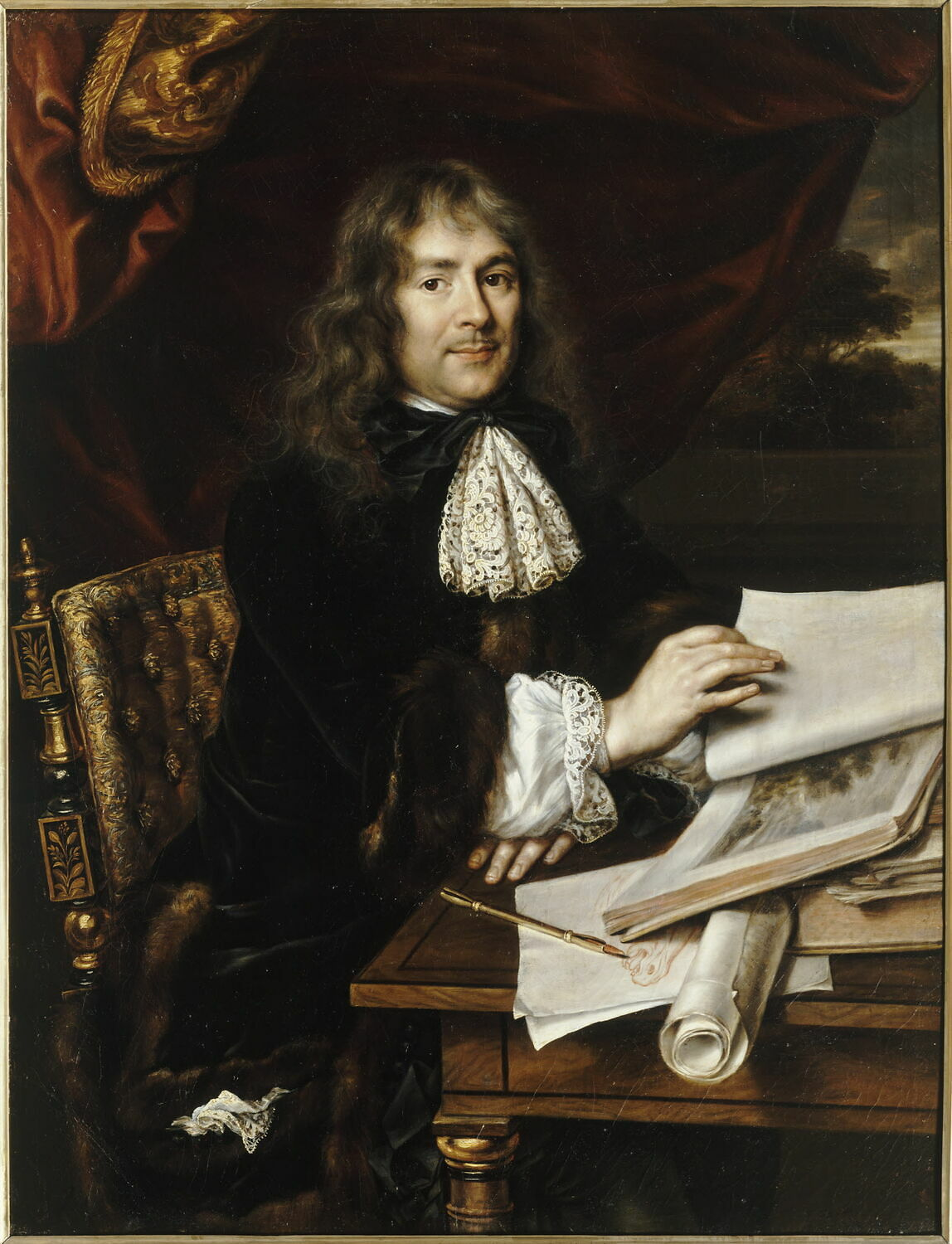
- Portrait of Antoine Paillet, 1677, by Florent Richard de Lamarre (Florent de La Mare-Richart)
- Born: 1626
- Died: June 30, 1701
- Occupation: Painter

Antoine Paillet (1626–1701) was a French painter. He was inducted into the Académie royale de peinture et de sculpture on August 2, 1759. Some of his paintings can be found at the Musée des Augustins in Toulouse or the Palace of Versailles near Paris.

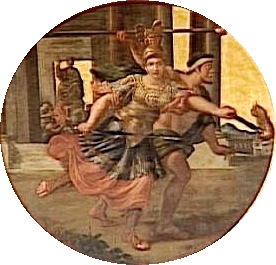
La Fureur et la guerre by Antoine Paillet, circa 1672, now at the Palace of Versailles.
