= Charles Poerson =

French painter

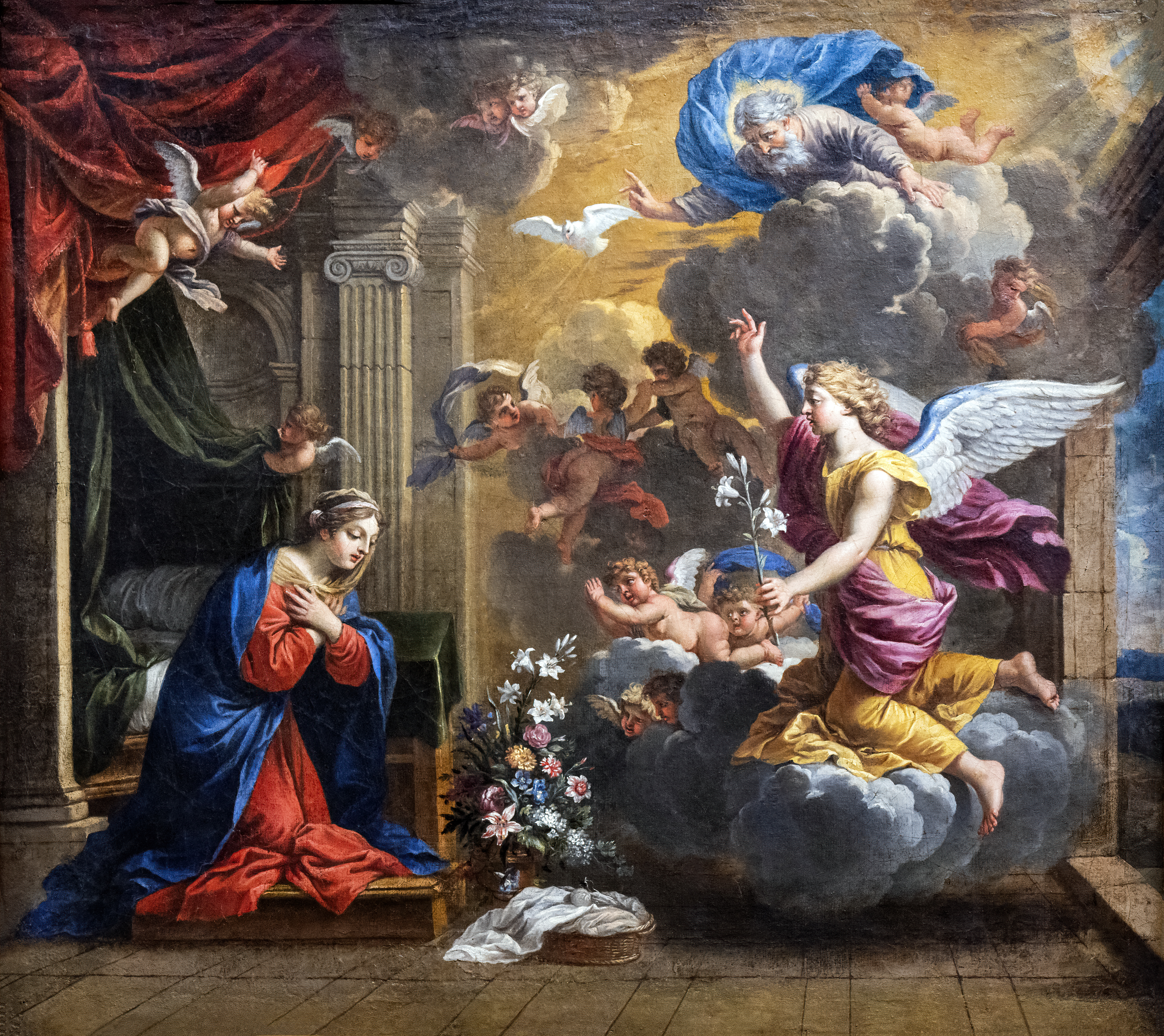
The Annunciation

Charles Poerson (c. 1609 – 1667) was a French painter. He is also notable as the father and tutor of the painter Charles-François Poerson.

== Life ==
Born in Vic-sur-Seille (then in Lorraine and not yet part of France) and a cousin of fellow painter Charles-Antoine Hérault, he studied under Simon Vouet and continued his style. Poerson received several religious commissions - he painted the May for 1642, Saint Peter Preaching in Jerusalem, and produced the cartoons for the Life of the Madonna for the interior of Notre-Dame de Paris: The Annunciation, now in the Musée des beaux-arts d'Arras and The Coronation of the Virgin, now in the Landesmuseum Mainz. He was also commissioned by cardinal Richelieu to paint the now-lost 'gallery of famous men' in his palace (now known as Palais Royal) - some works from that scheme survive, including The Election of Suger as Abbot of Saint-Denis and Louis VII Arriving at Abbot Suger's Funeral, both now in the Musée des Beaux-Arts de Nantes.

After Philippe de Champaigne and Jacques Stella, Poerson was the third painter to be taken on to produce a series of fourteen tapestries for Notre-Dame, completed between 1638 and 1657 to fulfil Louis XIII and Richelieu's vow to the Madonna in 1636. He produced designed for eleven of them between 1650 and 1657 - The Annunciation, The Visitation, The Nativity, The Adoration of the Magi, The Purification of the Virgin (The Presentation of Christ in the Temple), The Flight into Egypt, Christ Disputing with the Doctors of the Law, The Marriage at Cana, The Dormition of the Virgin, The Assumption and The Coronation of the Virgin. The finished tapestries were acquired by Strasbourg Cathedral chapter in 1739 and now hang in its nave every year between Advent and Epiphany. He died in Paris.

== Gallery ==
Rest on the Flight into Egypt (circa 1640)

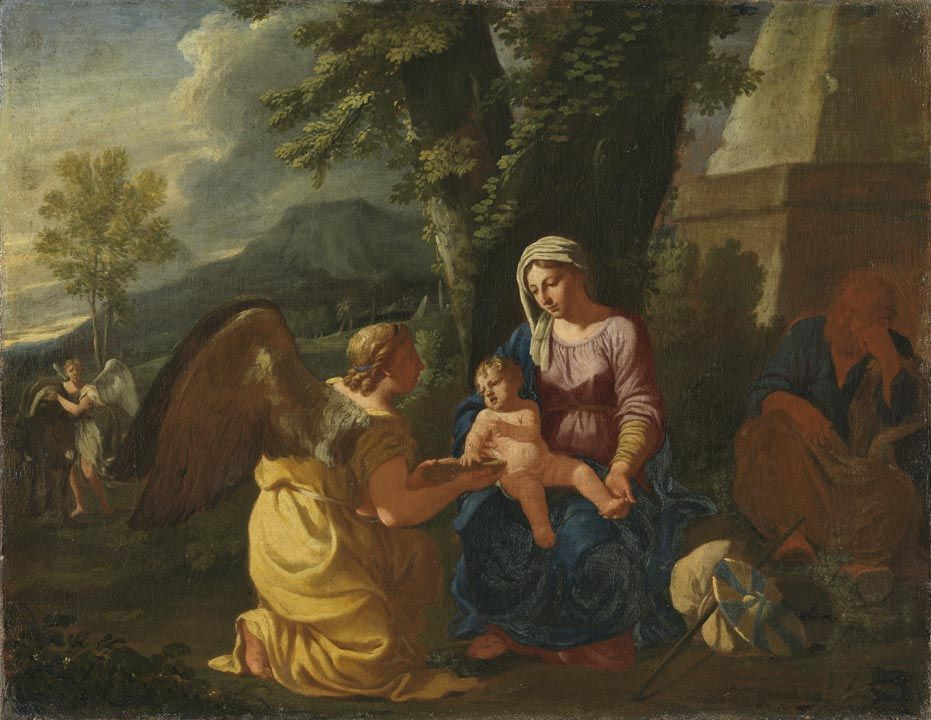
Rest on the Flight into Egypt

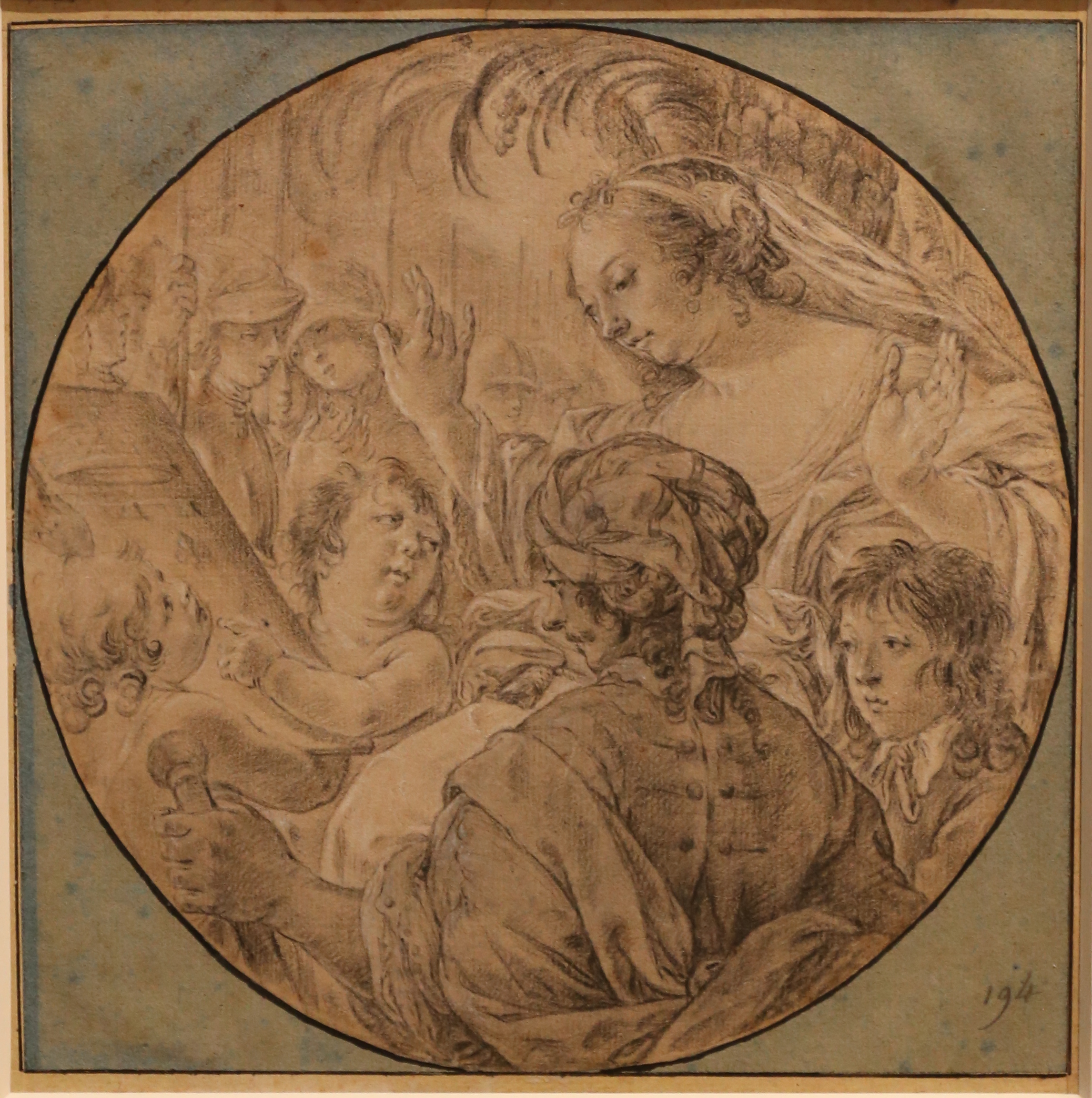
Allegory of the marriage of Gaston d'Orléans
