= Geneviève Boullogne =

French painter (1645–1708)

Geneviève Boullogne, Boullongne or Boulogne (22 August 1645 – August 1708) was a French painter and member of the Académie royale de peinture et de sculpture.

== Biography ==
She was born in Paris, the sister of the painters Bon, Madeleine and Louis. She trained under their father Louis Boullogne. and collaborated with Madeleine on the grand apartments at the Palace of Versailles. She later worked in Aix-en-Provence and married the sculptor Jean-Jacques Clérion. She died in Aix-en-Provence in 1708, though the exact date is uncertain.

She and her sister were both admitted to the Académie royale de peinture et de sculpture on 7 December 1669. She mainly painted historical subjects and still lifes, especially of flowers and fruit. She exhibited at least one painting on her own at the Paris Salon, that of a landscape in 1673. She worked closely with her sister, so much that it is often uncertain whether paintings were by one or both of them. These were therefore signed "Madelaire de Boulogne" or simply "Mlle Boulogne" with no first name.
