= Louis Boullogne =

French painter (1609–1674)

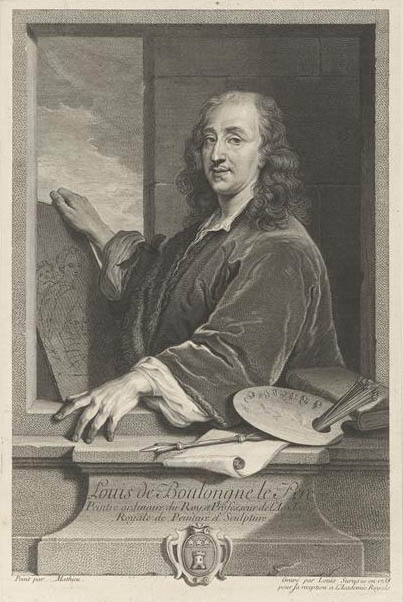
Louis de Boullogne (le père)

Louis Boullogne (French pronunciation: [lwi bulɔɲ]; August 1609, in Picardy – June 1674, in Paris), known as Louis le père, was a French painter.

== Life ==
After spending some years in Italy, Boullogne set up in Paris and made a major contribution to the organisation of the Académie de peinture, where he was a professor until his death.

He was a talented copyist and many anecdotes exist about this, which are more-or-less true. He painted Saint Simeón, St Paul's Miracle at Ephesus and The Beheading of St Paul as Mays for Notre Dame. He engraved copies of these himself and, in Rome in 1637, a copy of The Raising of Helena after Guido Reni.

All four of his children (Bon, Louis, Geneviève and Madeleine) became painters. Geneviève married the sculptor Jean-Jacques Clérion (c. 1640–1714).

== Bibliography ==
- Amédée Caix de Saint-Aymour, Les Boullongne : une famille d’artistes et de financiers aux XVIIe et XVIIIe siècles, Ed. Henri Laurens, Paris, 1919, p. 1 (online).

== Sources ==
- Ferdinand Hoefer, Nouvelle Biographie générale, vol. 7, Paris, Firmin-Didot, 1857, p. 11.
