= Louis de Boullogne =

French painter (1654–1733)

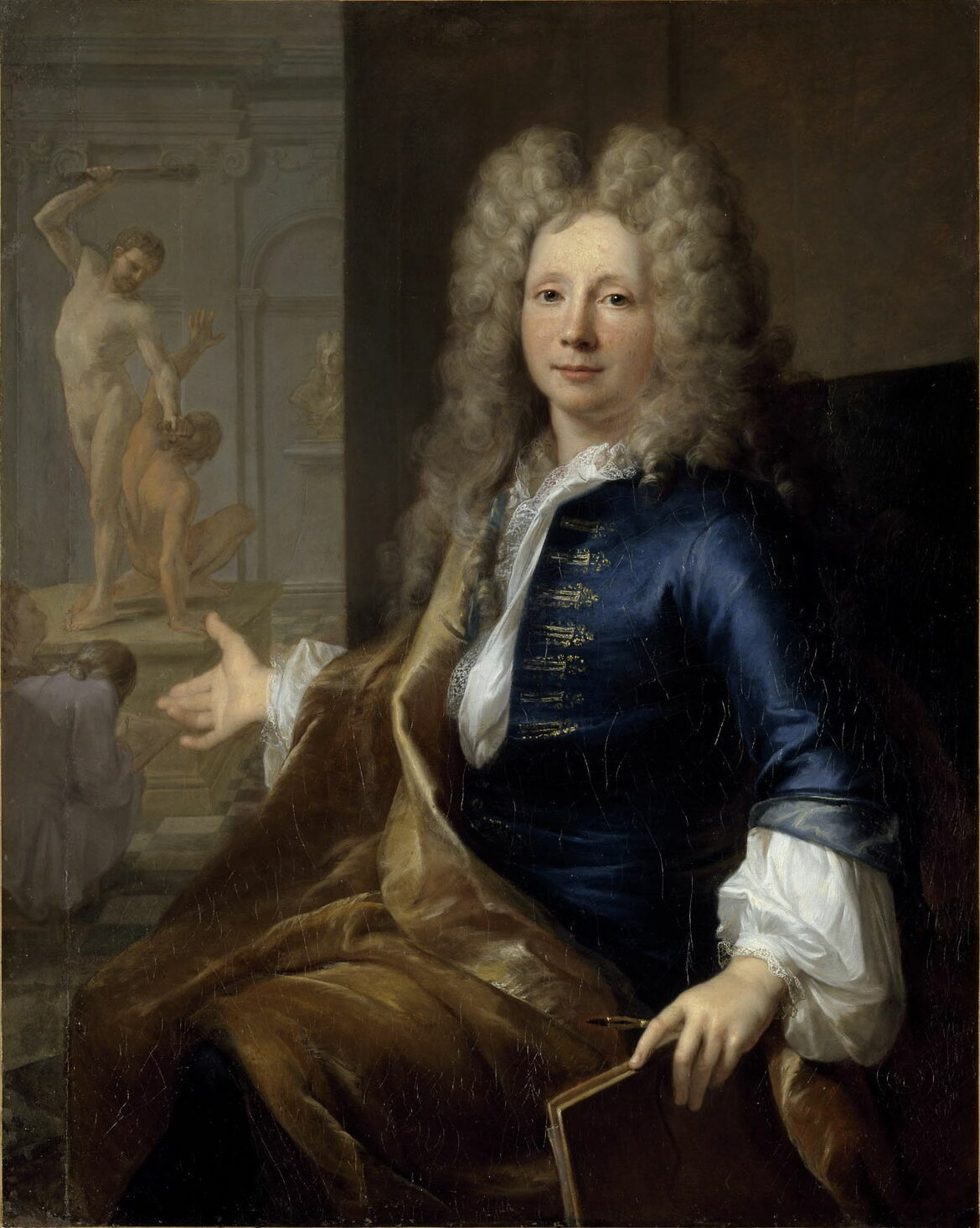
- Portrait of Boullogne from 1701 by Académie member Pierre Gobert
- Born: 19 November 1654; Paris, Kingdom of France
- Died: 2 November 1733 (aged 78); Paris, Kingdom of France
- Known for: Painting
- Spouse: Marguerite Bacquet
- Children: Jean de Boullonges
- Father: Louis Boullogne
- Relatives: Geneviève Boullogne (sister); Madeleine Boullogne (sister); Bon Boullogne (brother)

Director of the Académie de Peinture et de Sculpture
- In office 1722–1733
- Monarch: Louis XV
- Preceded by: Antoine Coypel
- Succeeded by: Claude-Guy Hallé (Note: Following Boullogne's sudden death, the four recteurs of the Académie took turns as Director until 1735); Nicolas de Largillière; Guillaume Coustou; Hyacinthe Rigaud

Louis de Boullogne II (French pronunciation: [lwi də bulɔɲ]; 19 November 1654 – 2 November 1733), also known as Boullogne fils, was a French painter.

== Life ==
Boullogne was born and died in Paris, and was the brother of Bon Boullogne. Their father, painter Louis Boullogne, who trained his four children, feared rivalry between the two brothers if Louis the younger became a painter and so at first opposed his wish to do so. However, his vocation finally won through and every evening Louis crossed Paris to go with Bon to draw at the Académie. Aged 18 he won the grand prix de peinture and left for Rome in 1676, when his brother returned from there. He made copies after The School of Athens, Disputation of the Holy Sacrament and many other works by Raphael, from which the Gobelins made many different tapestries for the French king. He won a prize at the Accademia di San Luca for a drawing of "Alexander Cutting the Gordian Knot".

Returning through Lombardy and Venice in 1680, Louis arrived in Paris and soon won a great reputation. In 1681 he was received as a member of the Académie de Peinture et de Sculpture: his reception piece being Augustus Orders the Closing of the Temple of Janus. On 3 February 1688 he married Marguerite Bacquet. He began to teach at the Academy in 1692. He was involved in the decoration of the Château de Meudon. In 1701 Boullogne received a royal commission to paint Flora and Zephyr as part of the grand redecoration of Francis I's gallery at Fontainebleau.

In 1722, he was chosen to design the medals and mottos for the Académie des inscriptions, receiving a new 1,000 livres pension and the ordre de Saint-Michel. He was made rector of the Académie de Peinture et de Sculpture; in 1725, first painter to the king, with letters patent of nobility for him and his descendants. In 1722, Boullogne became the Director of the Académie, a position he retained until his death in 1733. His students included Michel de Cornical, Louis Galloche and Jacques-François Courtin. A strong advocate of the Académie, Louis de Boullogne supported its students with his lessons and his protection. He was the sworn enemy of the pochades and bambochades, claiming that only those with great skill and a fully formed taste could be allowed to paint.

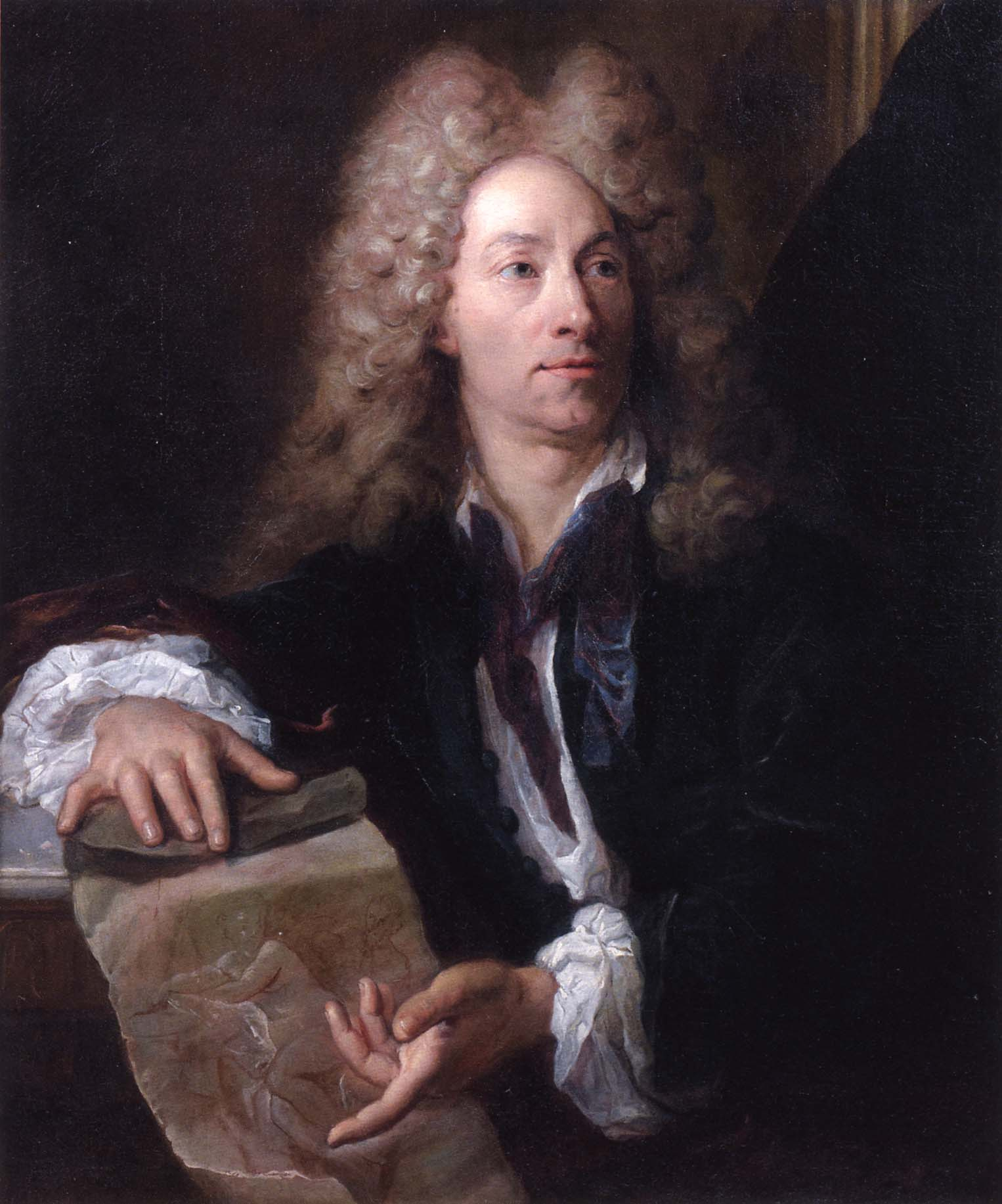
Louis de Boullogne; portrait by Gilles Allou

Boullogne produced religious paintings for Parisian churches and mythological subjects for royal residences.

Louis Boullogne was buried at Saint-Eustache, parish of his birth. He left a vast fortune to four children he had had with Bacquet - two sons (the eldest was councilor to the parlement de Metz, then conseiller d'État and an intendant des finances et ordres du roi, and the younger receiver general of finances for Tours) and two daughters (of which one married Jean-Pierre Richarol, receiver general of finances, with whom she had the painter Jean-Claude Richard, and the other became a nun).

== Works ==
In general, his compositions displayed a firm understanding of mise en scène, with a firm touch and striking colors. His heads display a great deal of expression and character and his talents were suited to easel paintings as well as large murals. From very early in his career, he favored the use of black and white chalk on blue paper with some slight hatching for both composition and figure studies. In some, the features are fixed and the shadows are faded.

Charles Dupuis, François de Poilly, Pierre Imbert Drevet, Étienne Baudet and others reproduced many of his works as engravings.

== Selected paintings ==
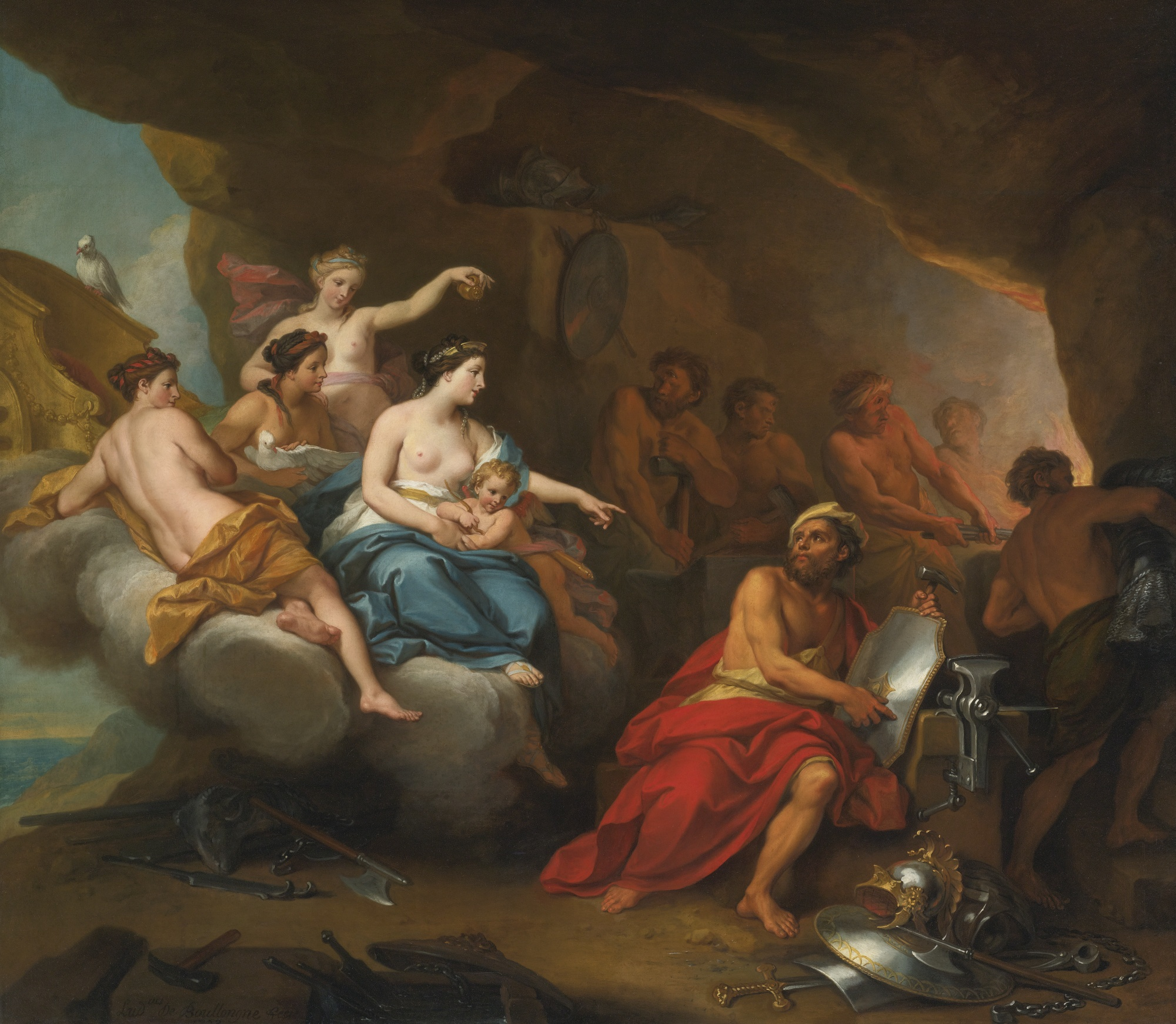
Venus in the Forge of Vulcan

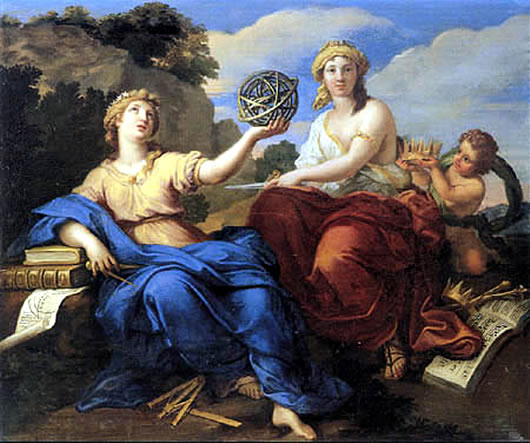
Urania and Melpomene

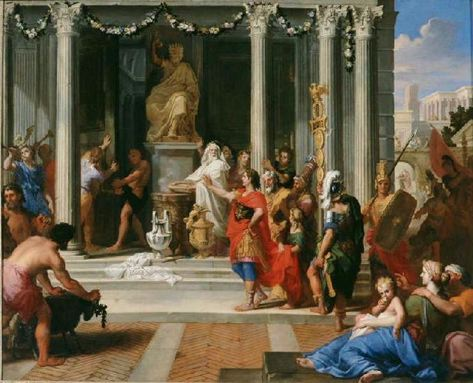
Augustus Orders the Closing of the Temple of Janus

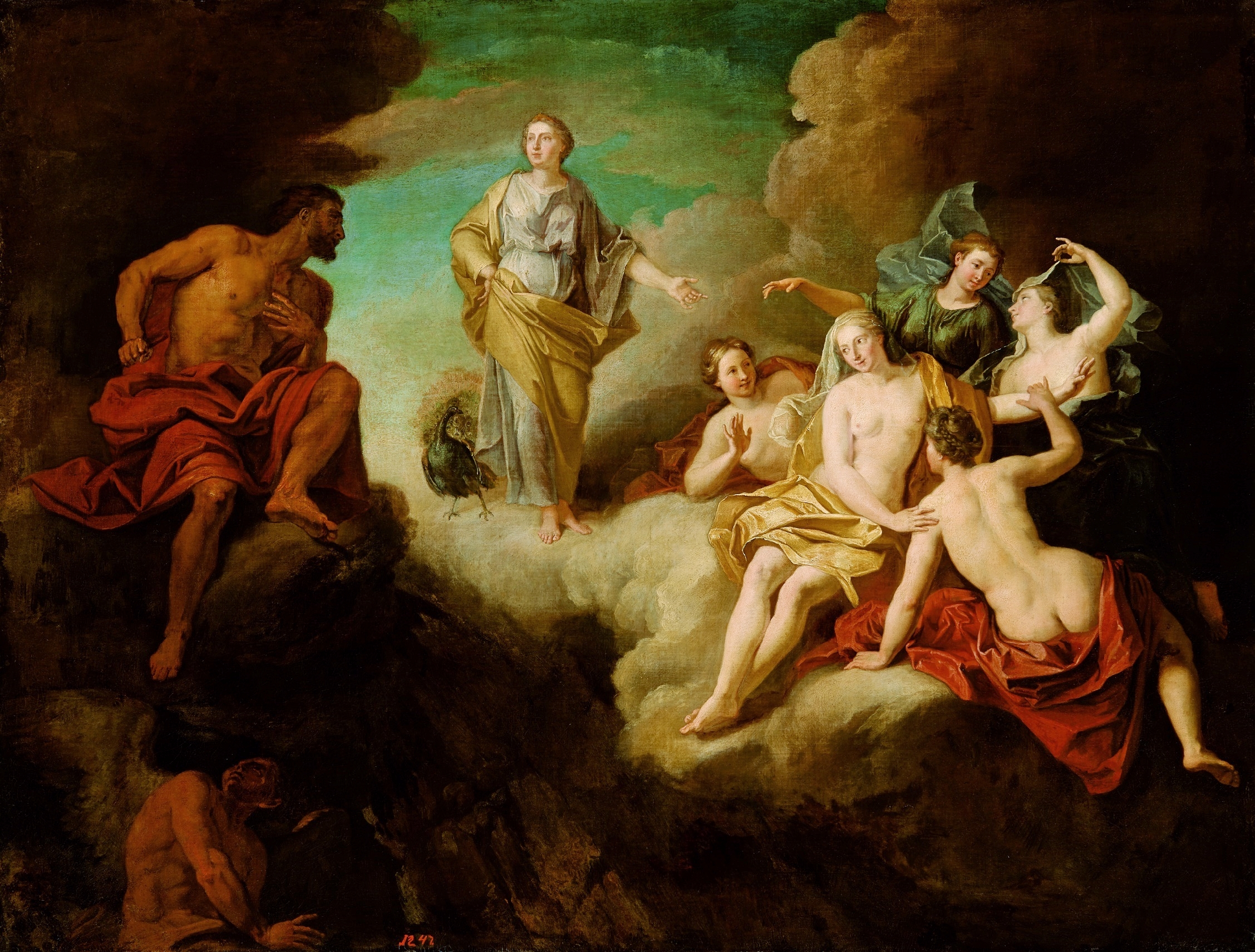
Juno Asking Aeolus to Release the Four Winds

== Sources ==
- Amédée Caix de Saint-Aymour, Les Boullongne : une famille d’artistes et de financiers aux XVIIe et XVIIIe siècles, Ed. Henri Laurens, Paris, 1919.
- Antoine Schnapper, Hélène Guicharnaud, Louis de Boullogne, 1654–1733, "Cahiers du dessin français" - n° 2, Ed. Galerie de Bayser, Paris, s. d., ISBN 2-205-67200-6.
- Ferdinand Hoefer, Nouvelle Biographie générale, t. 7, Paris, Firmin-Didot, 1857, p. 13-4.
