= Michel Corneille the Elder =

French painter

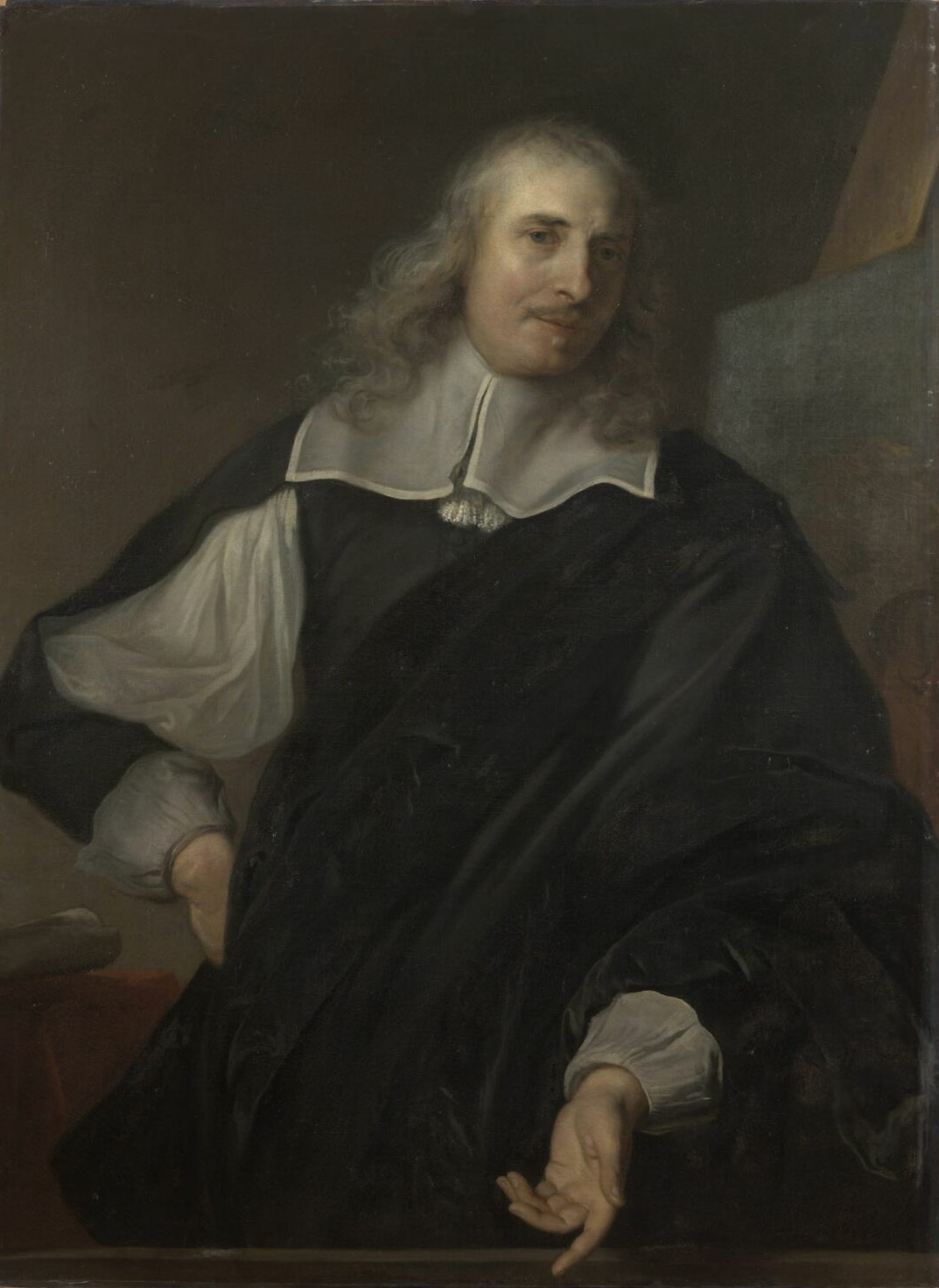
Portrait by Jacob van Loo, c. 1662

Michel Corneille the Elder (c. 1601 – 1664) was a French painter, etcher, and engraver.

== Life ==
Corneille was born in Orléans. He was one of many who studied with the celebrated master Simon Vouet, who strongly influenced French painting of the early 17th century.

In 1648, Corneille was one of the founders of the French Royal Academy of Painting and Sculpture and was elected as one of the original twelve elders in charge of its running. He became its rector in 1656.

Corneille devoted himself to historical paintings. He was an excellent colorist—in this more Venetian than French—and his early style resembled that of Simon Vouet; later his work had all the merits and all the faults of the post-Raphaelite, or decadent, "sweet", school of Italian art, showing the far-reaching influence of the Carracci. He was long employed in the decoration of churches in Paris, his masterpiece being the celebrated "St. Paul and St. Barnabas at Lystra", painted for the Cathedral of Notre-Dame. His etched and engraved work differed very little from that of the Carracci and of his two sons. It was chiefly reproductive. Notable examples are the "Murder of the Innocents", after Raphael, and the "Virgin Suckling the Infant Jesus", after Lodovico Carracci. He died in Paris in 1664.

== Gallery ==
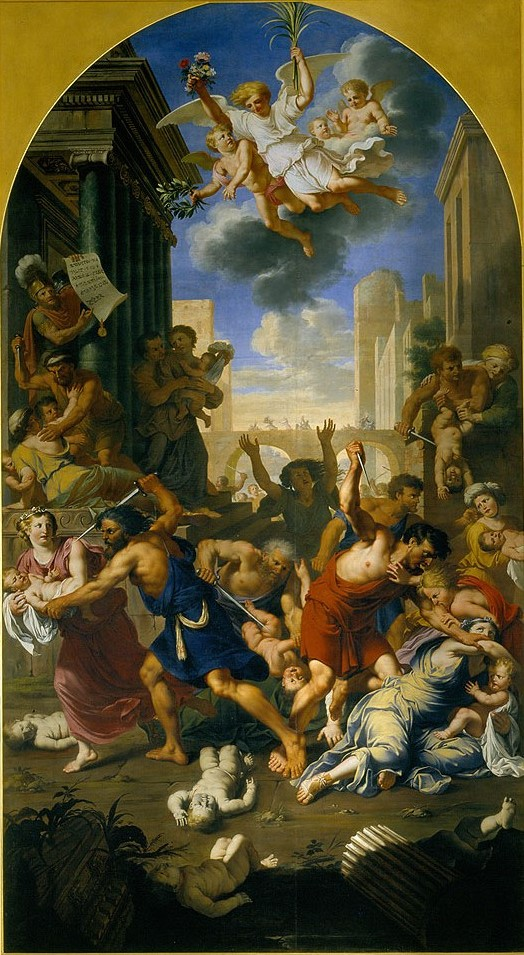
The Massacre of the Innocents

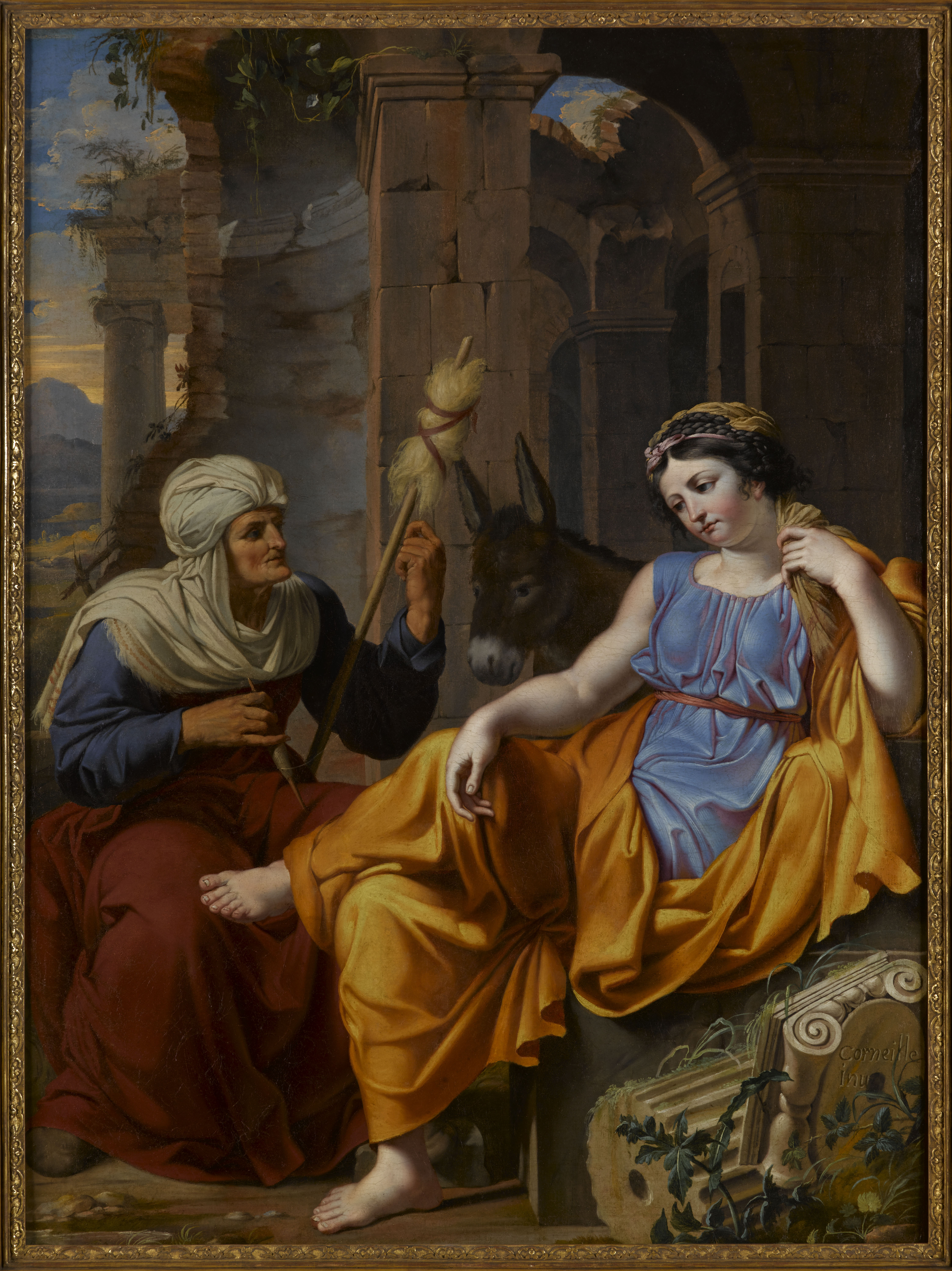
The Old Woman and Charity

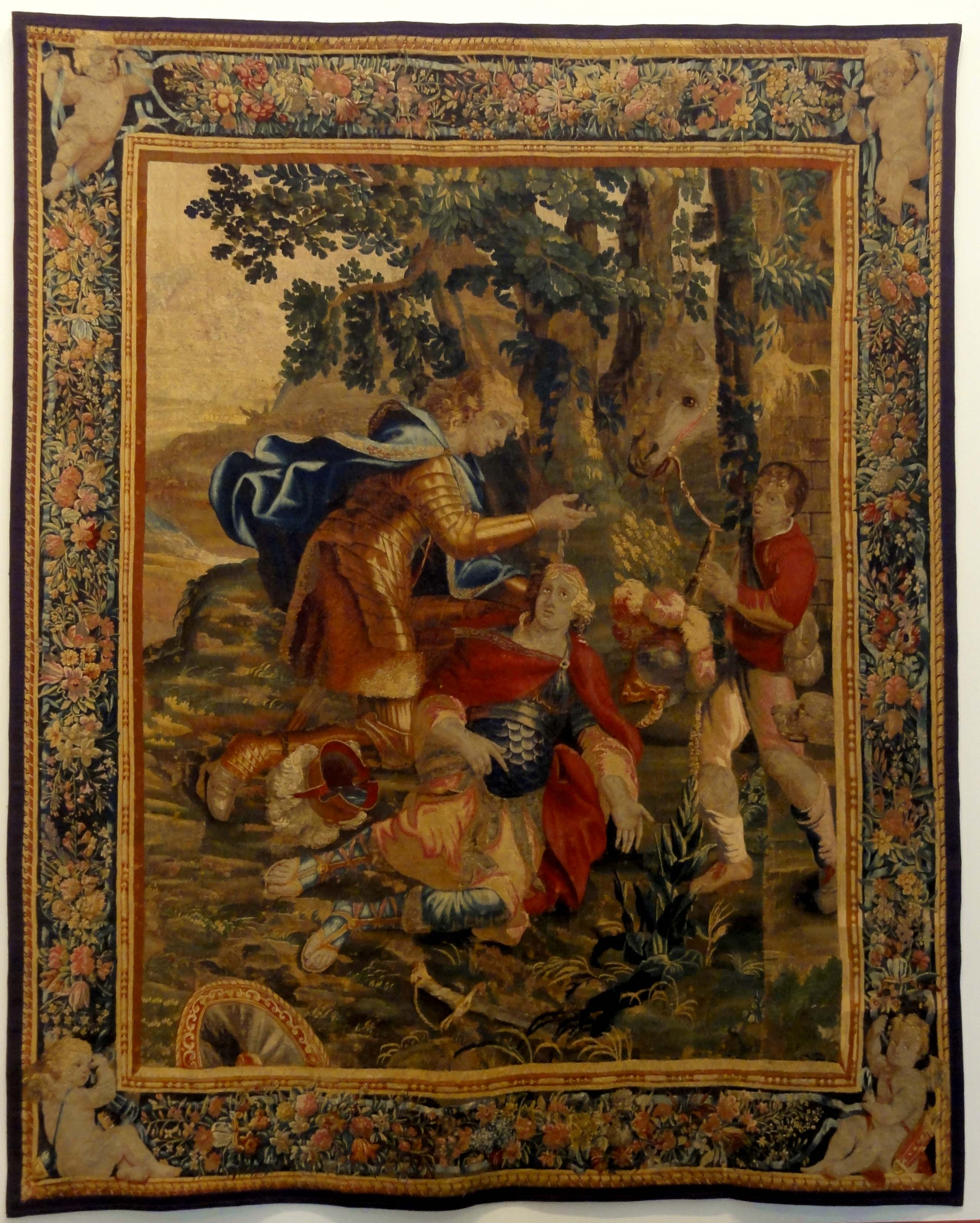
The Baptism of Clorinde, from Jerusalem Delivered

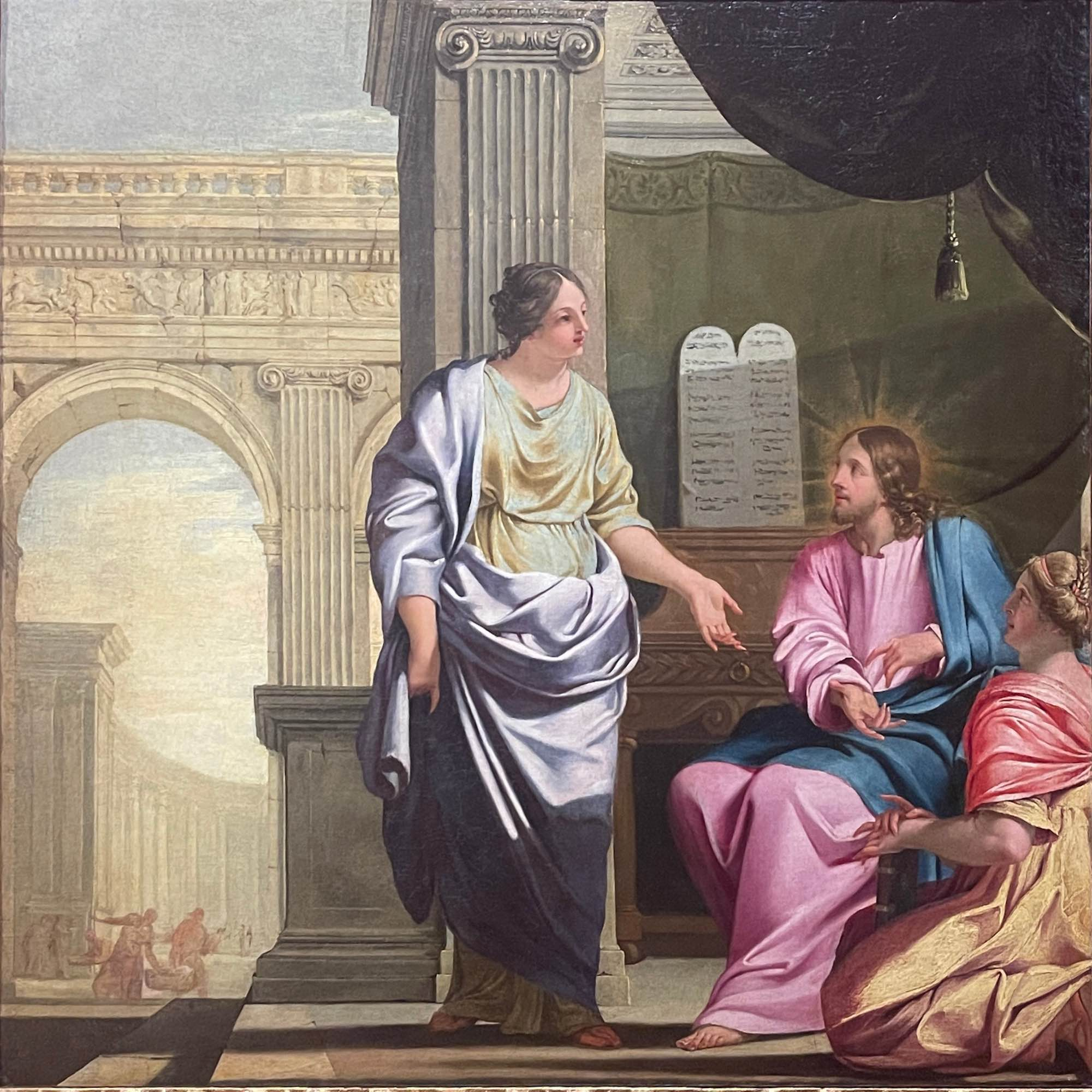
Jesus at the home of Martha and Mary

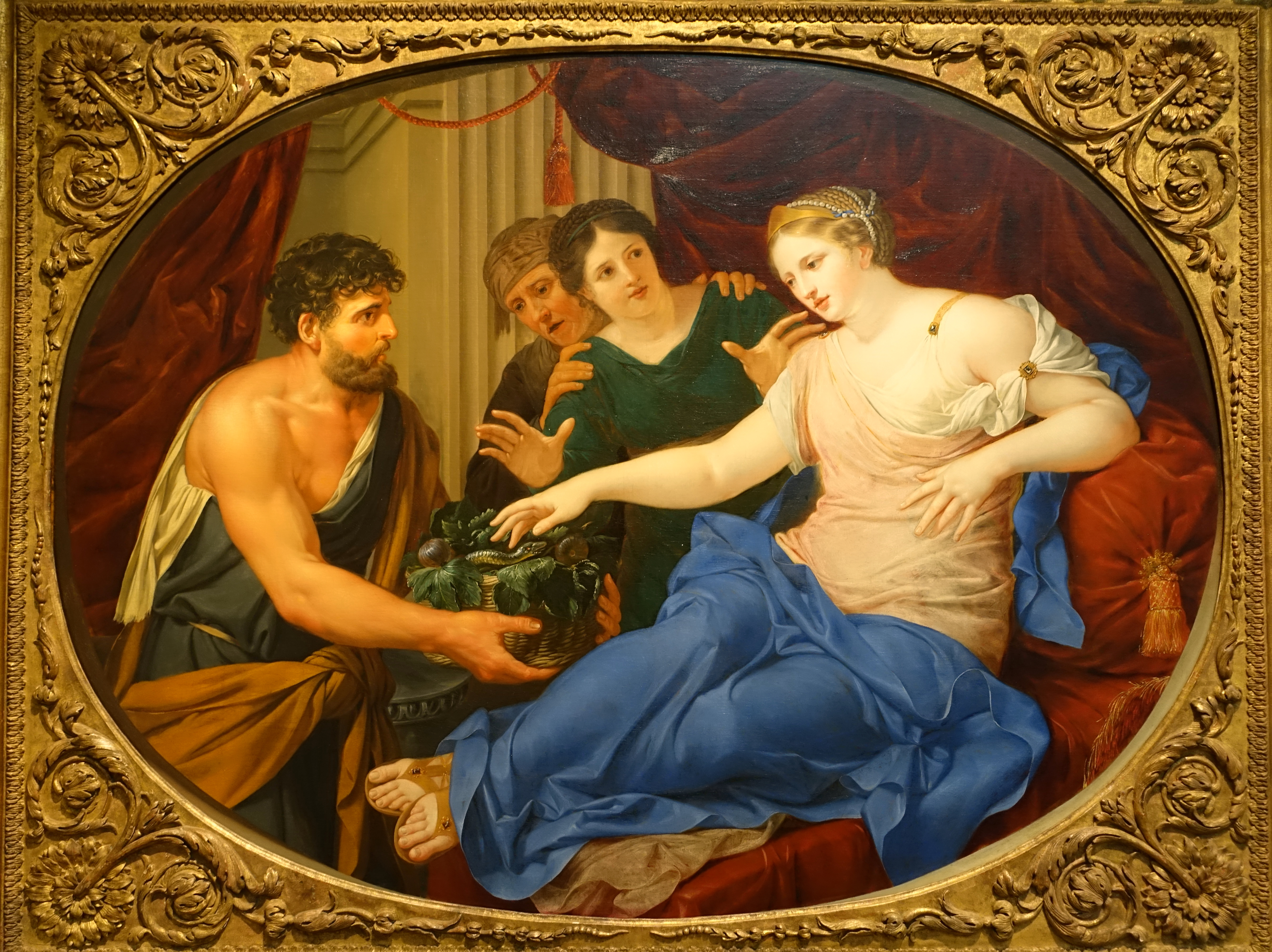
Cleopatra and the Asp

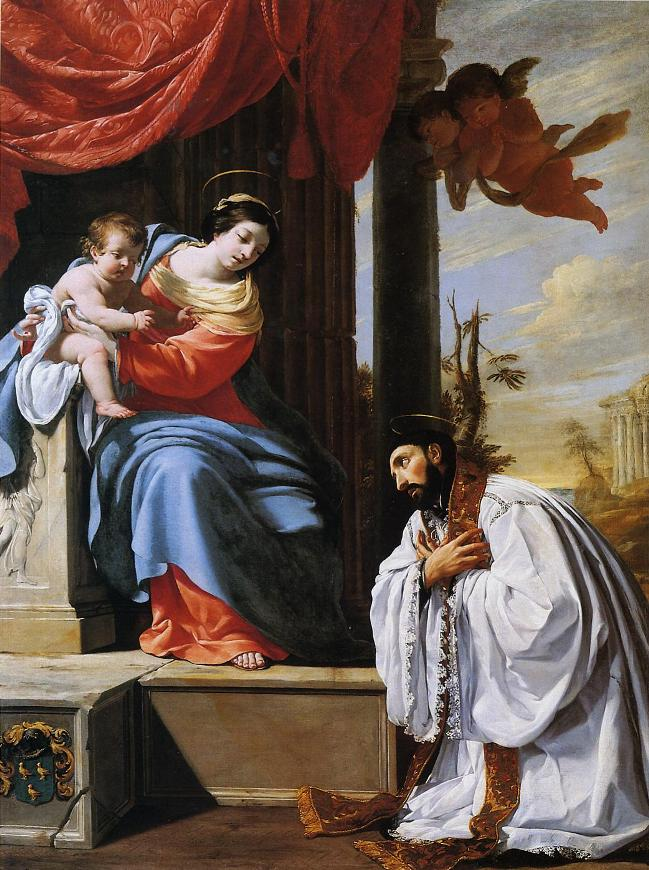
Saint Francis Xavier in adoration before the Virgin and Child

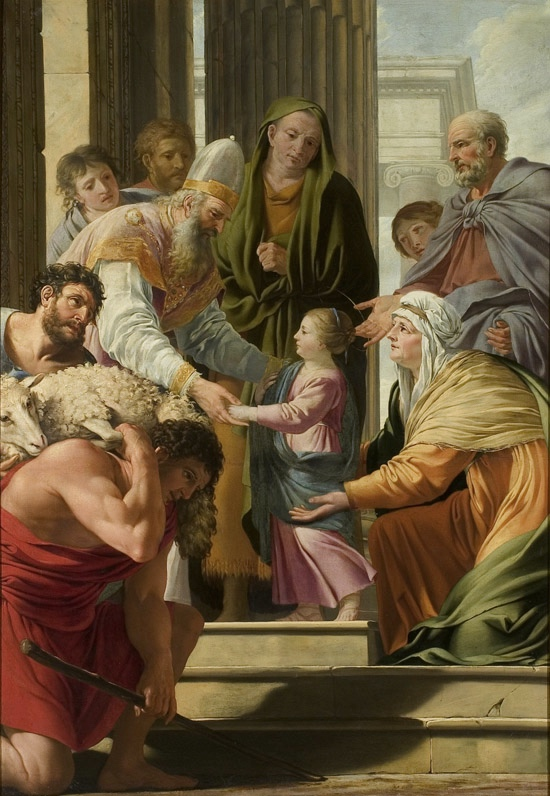
Presentation of the Virgin at the Temple

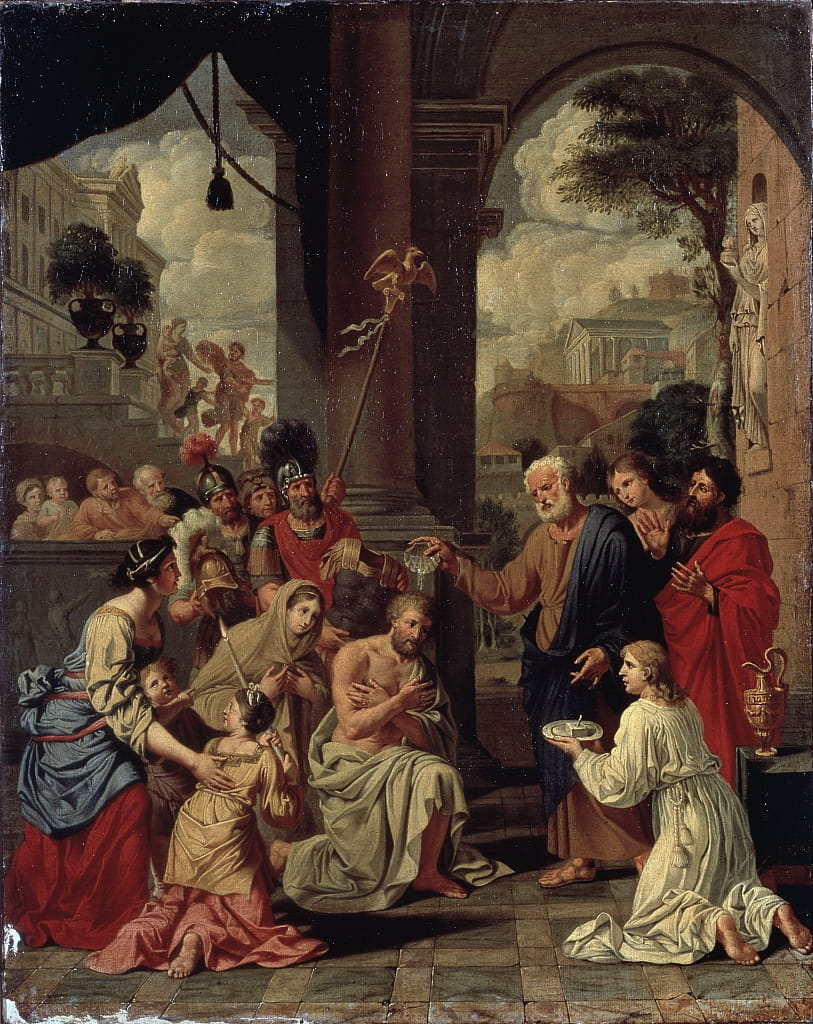
Baptism of the Centurion

== Bibliography ==
- Bender, Ewald [in German] (1912). "Corneille, Michel". In Thieme, Ulrich (ed.). Allgemeines Lexikon der bildenden Künstler (in German). Vol. 7. Leipzig: E. A. Seemann. pp. 423–424. OCLC 1039490042 – via the Internet Archive.
- Bénézit, Emmanuel (2006) [first published in French in 1911–1923]. Benezit Dictionary of Artists. Vol. 3. Paris: Gründ. p. 1403. ISBN 2-7000-3073-7 – via the Internet Archive.
- Blumer, Marie-Louise (1961). "Corneille (Michel)". In Roman d'Amat, Jean-Charles; et al. (eds.). Dictionnaire de biographie française (in French). Vol. 9. Paris: Letouzey et Ané. cols. 676–678.
- Coquery, Emmanuel (1999). "Corneille, Michel (l'ancien; le pere)". In Kasten, Eberhard; et al. (eds.). Allgemeines Künstlerlexikon (in German). Vol. 21. München, Leipzig: Saur. p. 227. ISBN 3-598-22761-2 – via the Internet Archive.
- Parmantier-Lallement, Nicole (1996). "Corneille". In Turner, Jane (ed.). The Dictionary of Art. Vol. 7. New York: Grove's Dictionaries. pp. 863–864. ISBN 1-884446-00-0 – via the Internet Archive.
- MEYER, Geschichte der französischen Malerei (Leipzig, 1867)
- That entry was written by Leigh Hunt.
