= Jean Jouvenet =

French painter (1644–1717)

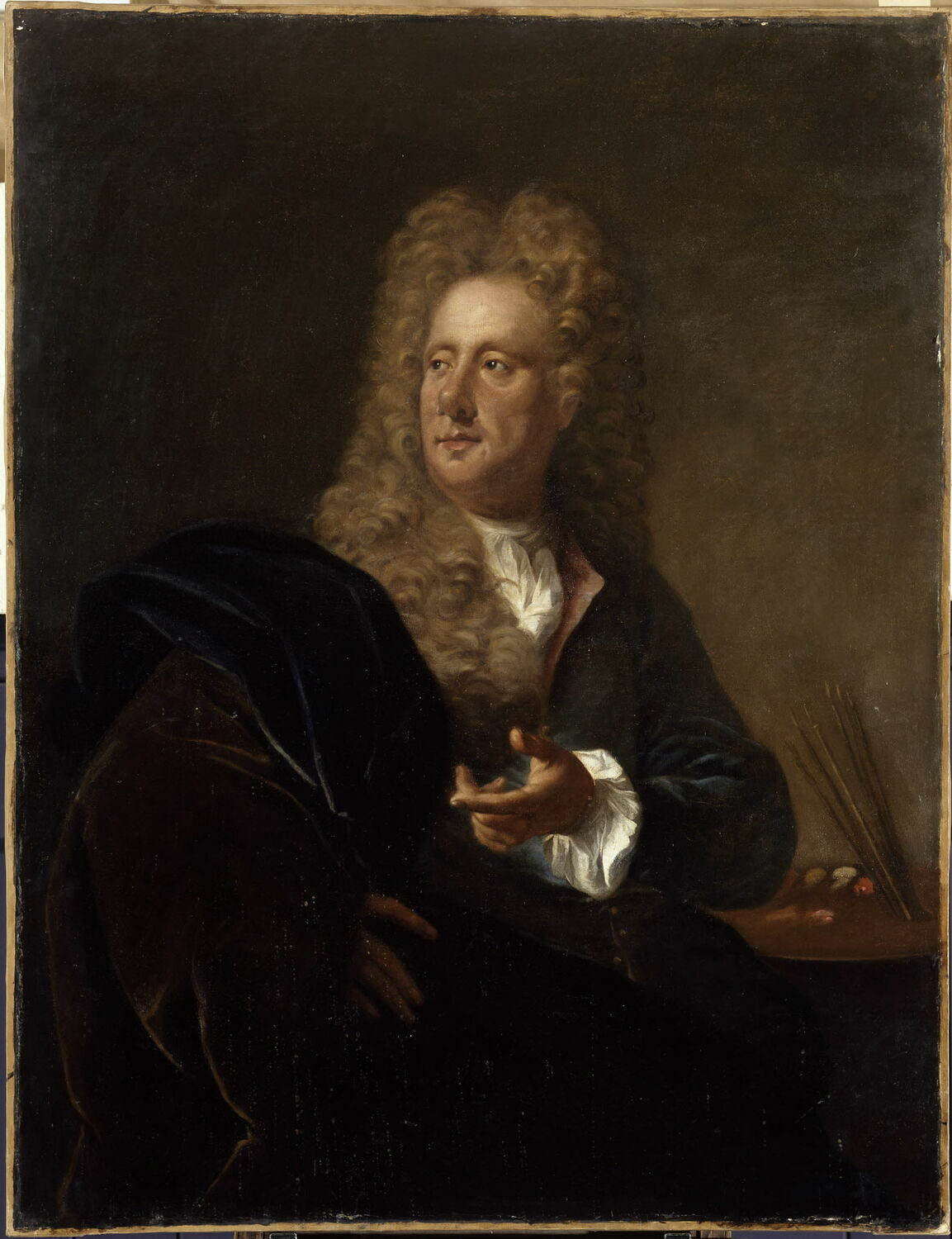
- Portrait by Jean Tortebat, 1699
- Born: 1 May 1644; Rouen, France
- Died: 5 April 1717 (aged 72); Paris, France

Director of the Académie de Peinture et de Sculpture
- In office 1705–1708
- Monarch: Louis XIV
- Preceded by: Antoine Coysevox
- Succeeded by: François de Troy

Jean-Baptiste Jouvenet (French pronunciation: [ʒɑ̃ batist ʒuvnɛ]; 1 May 1644 – 5 April 1717) was a French painter, especially of religious subjects.

== Biography ==
He was born into an artistic family in Rouen. His first training in art was from his father, Laurent Jouvenet; a generation earlier, his grandfather, Noel Jouvenet, may have taught Nicolas Poussin.

Jouvenet early showed a remarkable aptitude for his profession, and on arriving in Paris, attracted the attention of Le Brun, by whom he was employed at Versailles, notably in the Salon de Mars (1671–74), and under whose auspices, in 1675, he became a member of the Académie royale de peinture et de sculpture, of which he was elected professor in 1681, and one of the four perpetual rectors in 1707. He also worked under Charles de La Fosse in the Invalides and Trianon. Jouvenet was later Director of the Académie from 1705 to 1708.

The great mass of works that he executed, chiefly in Paris, many of which, including his celebrated Miraculous Draught of Fishes (engraved by Jean Audran) are now in the Louvre, show his fertility in invention and execution, and also that he possessed in a high degree that general dignity of arrangement and style which distinguished the school of Le Brun. Anthony Blunt found in Jouvenet's manner reminiscences of Poussin, Le Sueur, and the late work of Raphael, but with a characteristic Baroque emotionalism that "is still far from the full Baroque ... His compositions are primarily planned as high reliefs, and the movements are in sharp diagonal straight lines rather than in curves." The naturalism of Jouvenet's style sets his work apart from most of the religious paintings of his time.

Jouvenet died on 5 April 1717, having been forced by paralysis during the last four years of his life to work with his left hand.

== Gallery ==
Works by Jean Jouvenet

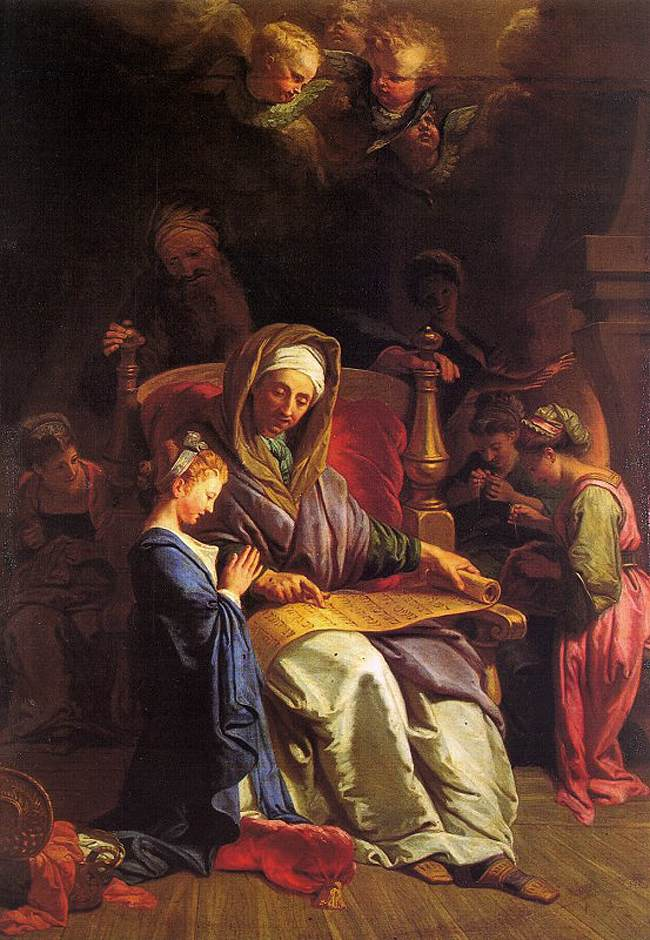
The Education of the Virgin (1700)

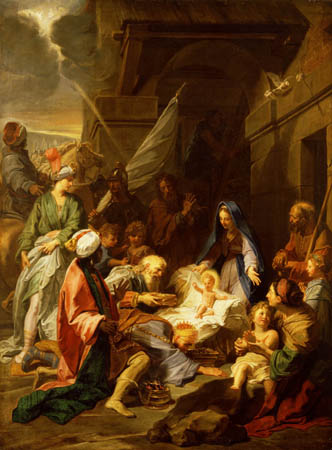
Adoration of the Magi

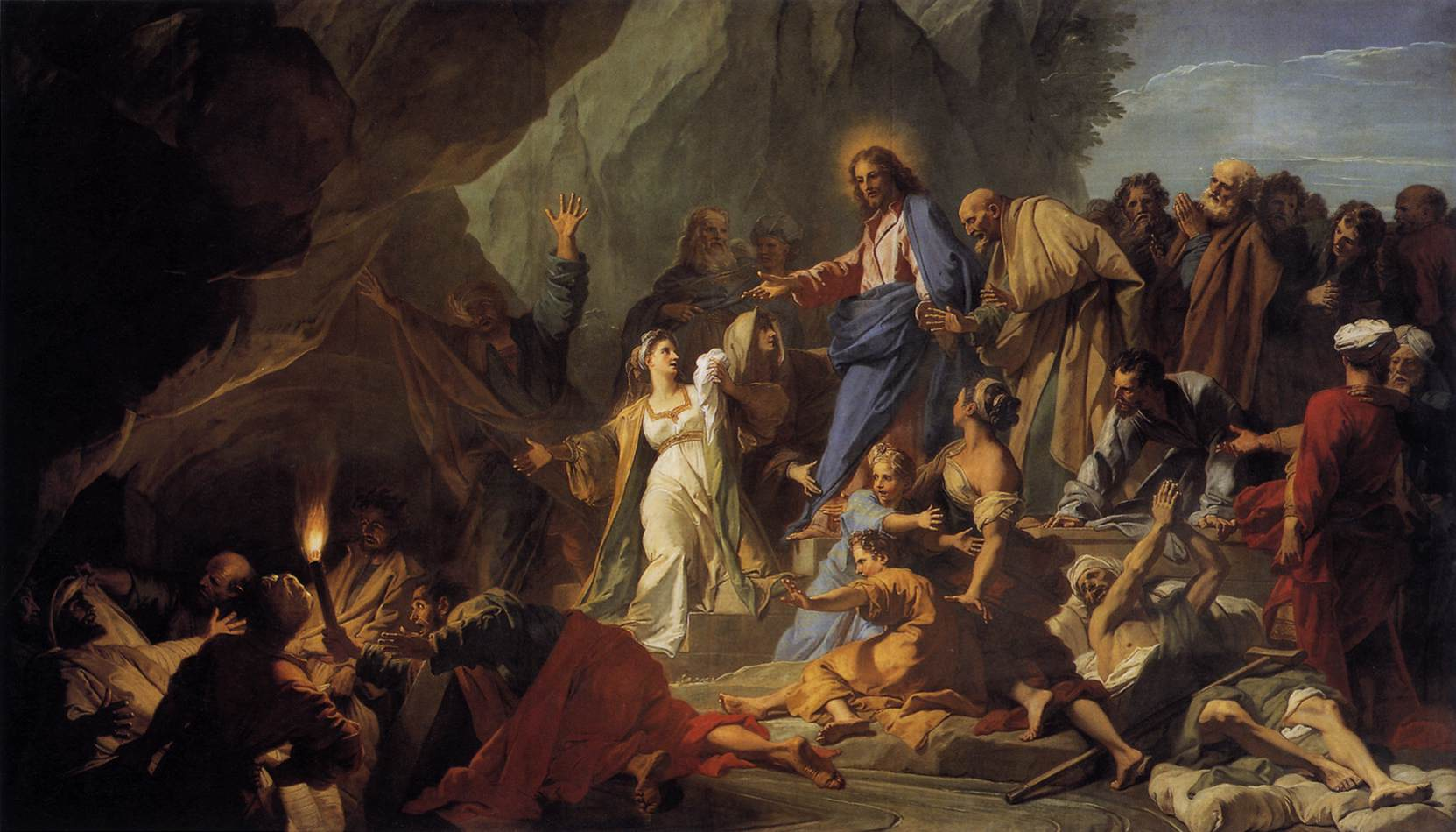
The Raising of Lazarus (1706)

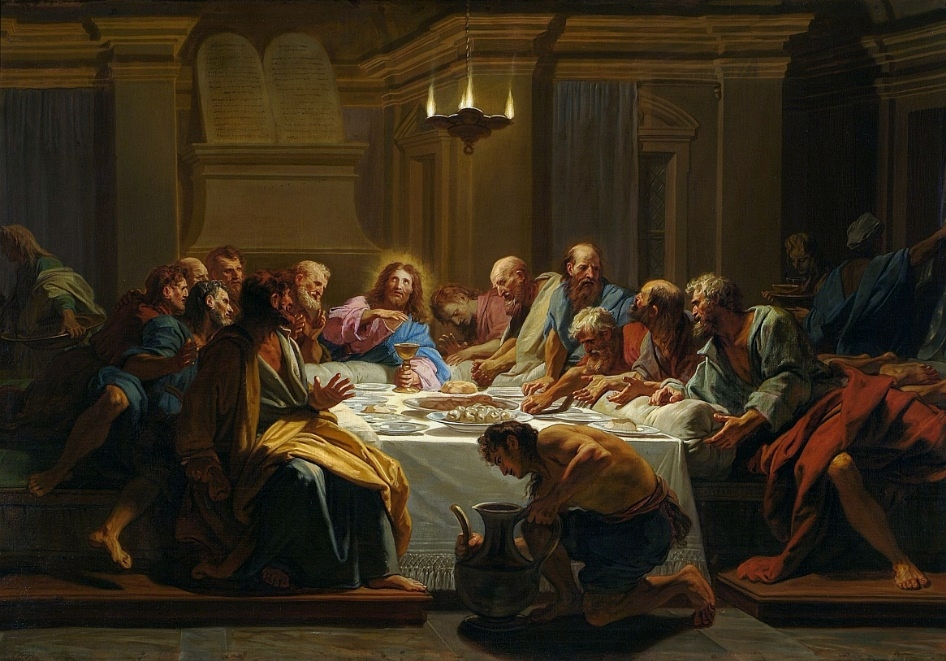
Last Supper

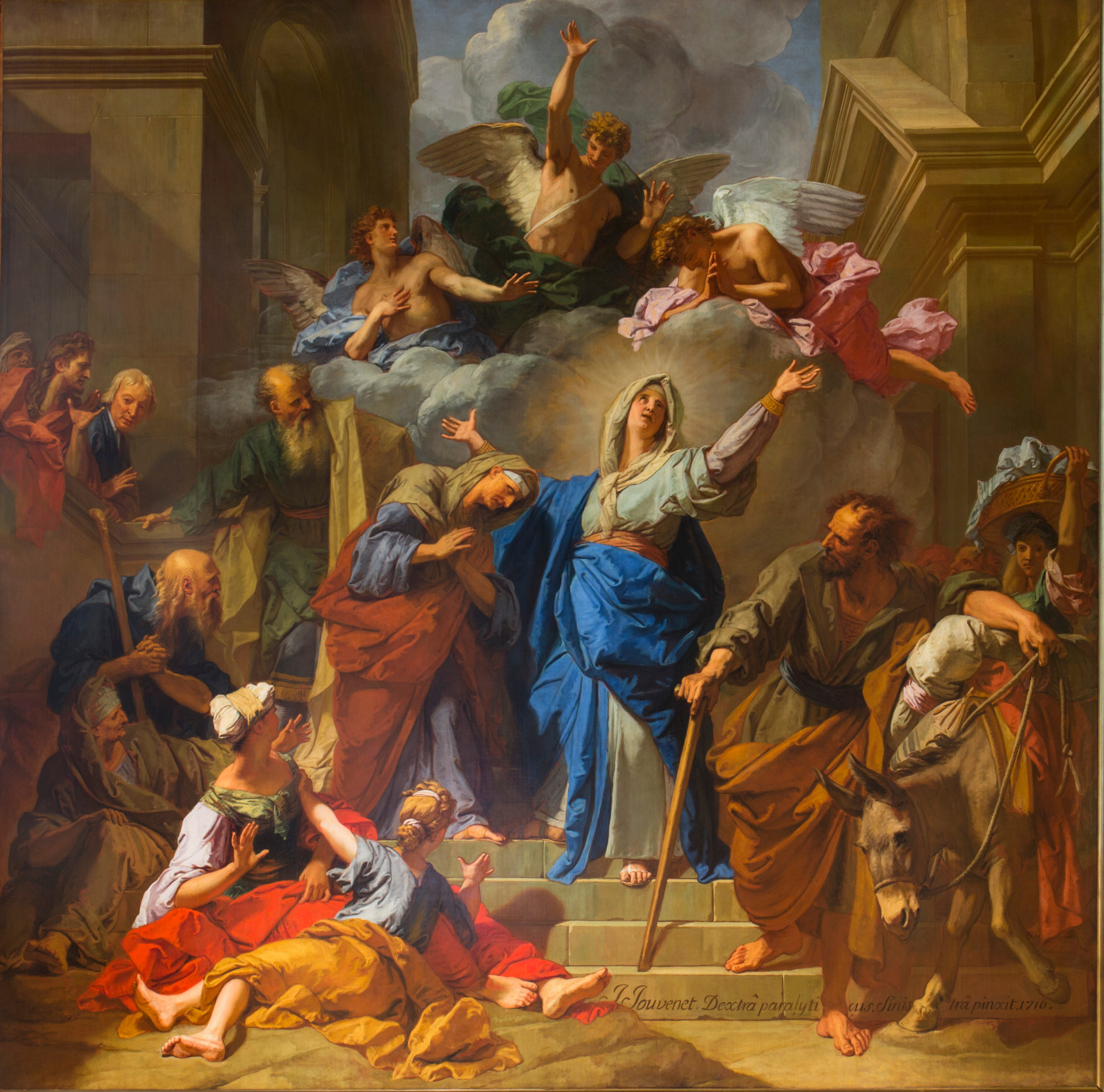
Visitation de la Vierge (1716)

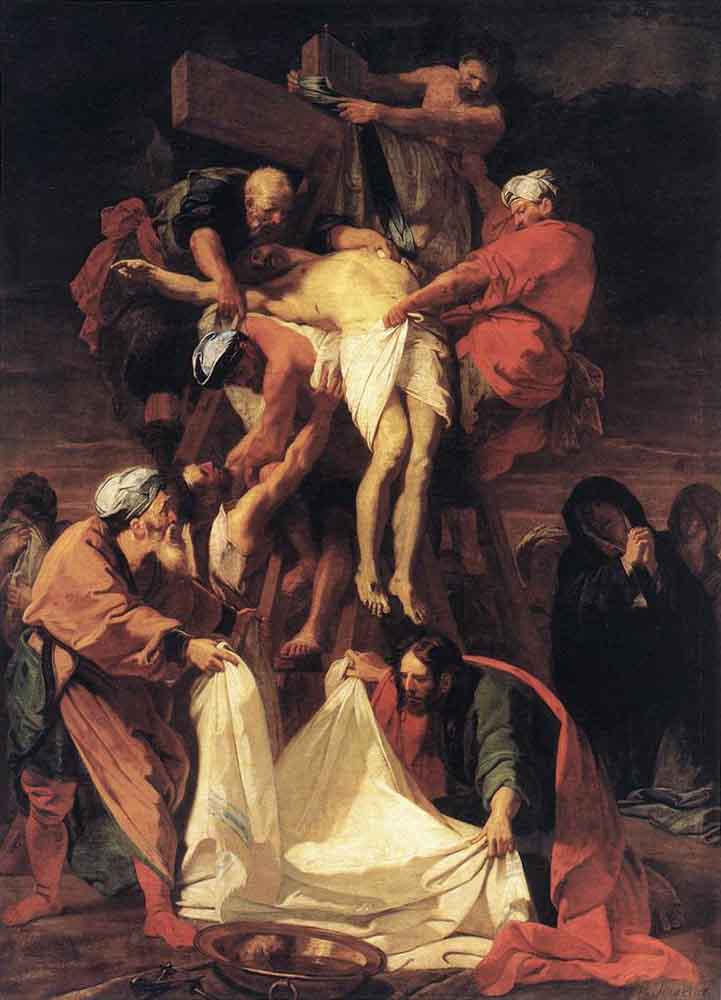
Descent From The Cross (1697)

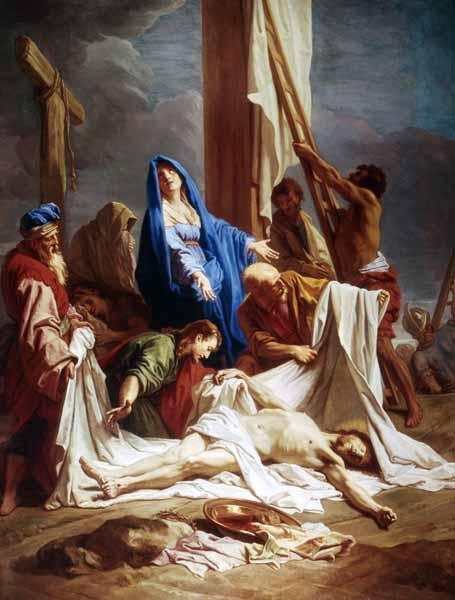
The Deposition (1709)

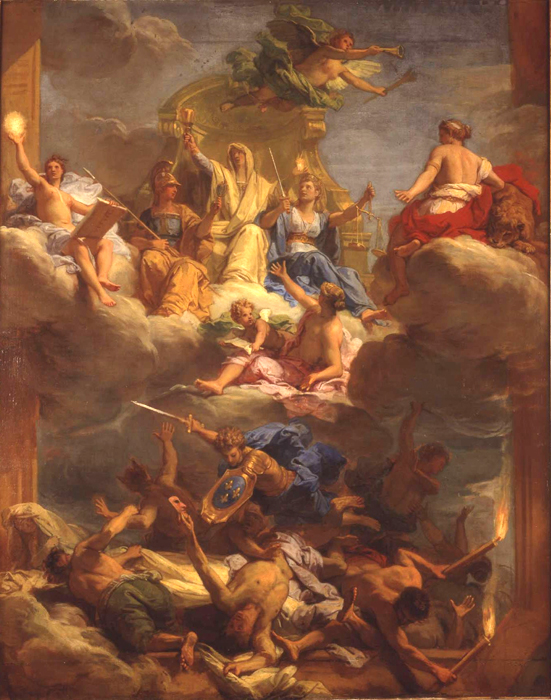
The Triumph of Justice (1713)

== Rediscoveries ==
- Darius and Alexandre, c. 1670, graphite on blue paper, study for the canvas offered to the Lycée Louis-le-Grand (Paris) by the King Louis XIV in 1674 (rediscovered in 2006 by Alain Béjard & Dimitri Joannidès, Alicem Institute, Luxemburg)
