= Notre-Dame du Calvaire, Paris =

Former convent in Paris, France

Coordinates: 48.861835°N 2.364909°E

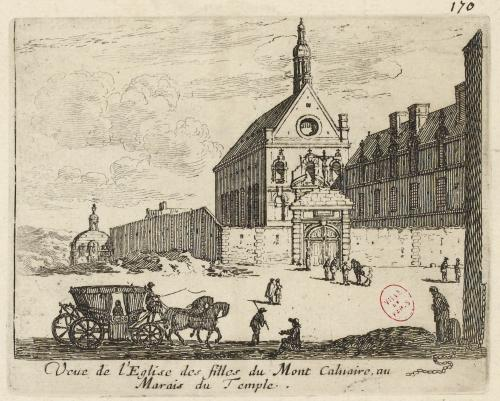
Couvent des Filles du Calvaire

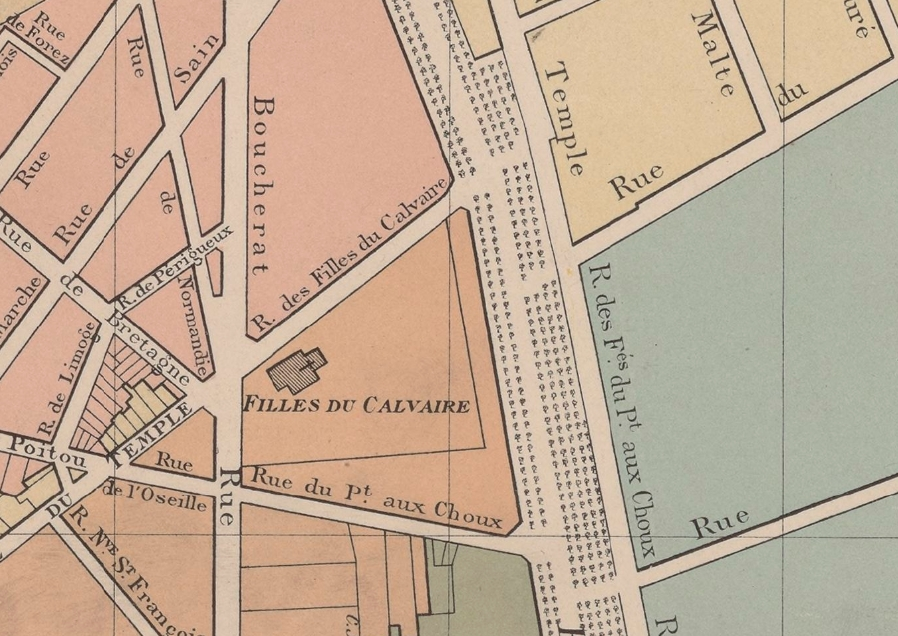
Map location of the former convent.

The Convent of Our Lady of Calvary (French: couvent de Notre-Dame du Calvaire), also named Convent of the Filles du Calvaire (couvent des Filles du Calvaire), is a former Roman Catholic convent in Paris, France.

== Location ==
The convent was located between streets Rue des Filles-du-Calvaire, Rue Boucherat (now Rue de Turenne), Rue du Pont-aux-Choux and Boulevard des Filles-du-Calvaire.

== History ==
Father Joseph purchased the Hôtel de l'Ardoise, a property located at the end of Rue Vieille-du-Temple, in order to fund a second establishment for the Nuns of Our Lady of Calvary. The nuns settled in the building in 1633. The foundation stone of the church was laid in 1635 by Dutchess d'Aiguillon, who was standing in for her uncle Cardinal Richelieu.

The convent, completed on April 10, 1637, was supposed to be named the "Convent of the Crucifixion" as requested by Father Joseph, but the church was consecrated in 1650 as the "Church of the Transfiguration". In the same period, the nuns of Our Lady took possession of the church.

The Congregation of Our Lady of Calvary was dissolved in 1790 during the French Revolution, and their property was sold as a national good on Vendémiaire 8, Year V (September 29, 1796). In 1804, the Rue Neuve-de-Bretagne (now Rue Froissard) and Rue Neuve-de-Ménilmontant (now Rue Commines), were established through the site of the former convent, without any permission. They were incorporated into the public road system in 1806. A third street and a passageway, which were planned as a part of the housing estate plan on the site, were not established.

== Bibliography ==
- Napoléon Chaix, Paris guide, 1807 (in French), Librairie internationale.
- Jacques Hillairet, Dictionnaire historique des rues de Paris (in French).
- Félix et Louis Lazare, Dictionnaire administratif et historique des rues de Paris et de ses monuments (in French), 1844.
- Jean de La Tynna, Dictionnaire topographique, étymologique et historique des rues de Paris (in French), 1817.
