= Rue de l'Université, Paris =

Street in Paris, France

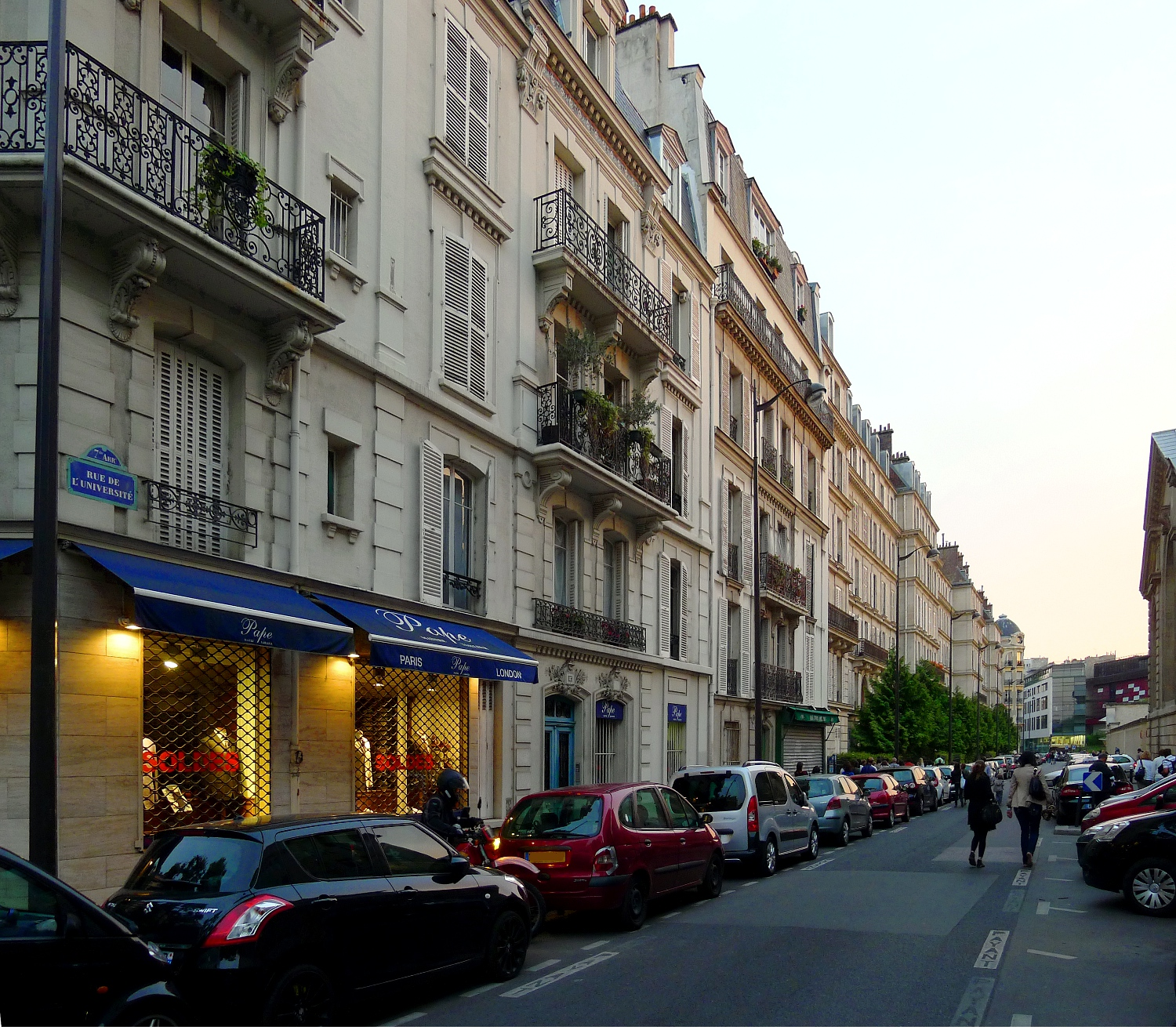
The Rue de l'Université at the crossroads of the Avenue Rapp

The Rue de l'Université (French pronunciation: [ʁy d(ə) lynivɛʁsite]) is a street located in the 7th arrondissement of Paris, France. The official address of the Palais Bourbon, the seat of the National Assembly, is at 126 Rue de l'Université.

== Location ==
The 2,785 m long street (the tenth longest in the French capital, see List of Parisian routes by length) of variable width, between 10.5 m and 15 m, is flat and parallel to the Seine from which it is only a few hundred metres away.

It begins, in the east, at the crossroads with the Rue des Saints-Pères and goes west-northwest, crosses the Boulevard Saint-Germain and then resumes due west at the level of the Palais Bourbon, crosses the Esplanade des Invalides, the Boulevard de la Tour-Maubourg then the Avenue Bosquet and the Avenue Rapp; it then turns a little to the south, crosses the Avenue de La Bourdonnais before ending in a dead end on the Allée Paul-Deschanel on the northeast square of the Eiffel Tower.

== Origin of the name ==
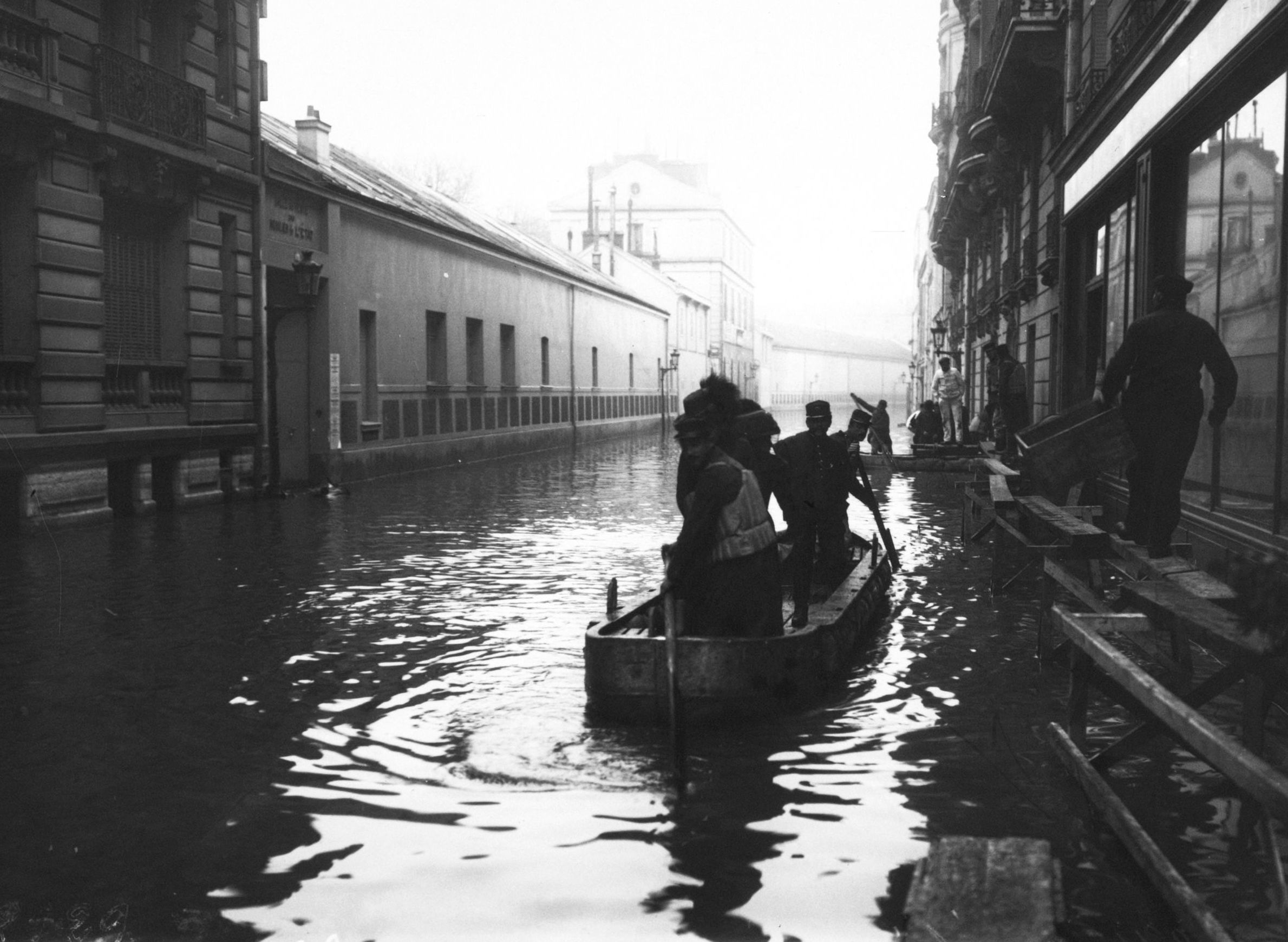
The Rue de l'Université during the 1910 Great Flood of Paris

In the 12th century, the former university of Paris acquired a territory located along the Seine, west of the Abbey of Saint-Germain-des-Prés to which it previously belonged. This territory was called "Pré-aux-Clercs" (first mentioned in 960): either because students (formerly called "clerics") came to relax during their rest periods, or because the "watch" or review of the subjects of the king of the Basoche took place there every year (this association was only recognized in 1303).

Le Pré-aux-Clercs was also the scene of many duels.

In 1639, the University sold the Pré-aux-Clercs and it was subdivided into a new district of Paris whose main street took the name "Rue de l'Université". Later, with the successive extensions of the city, this street was extended to the Champ-de-Mars, crossing the Esplanade des Invalides. The street ran along an arm of the Seine until the connection of the former île des Cygnes at the end of the 18th century.

== History ==
Until 1838, the Rue de l'Université was composed of two distinct parts:

- the first, between the Rue des Saints-Pères and the Rue d'Iéna, bore the name "Rue de l'Université";
- the second part, from the Rue d'Austerlitz (Paris) to the Avenue de La Bourdonnais, was called "Rue de l'Université-au-Gros-Caillou".

A prefectoral decree of 31 August 1838 prescribes the reunion of these two parties under the same name of "Rue de l'Université".

=== Commemorative plaques ===
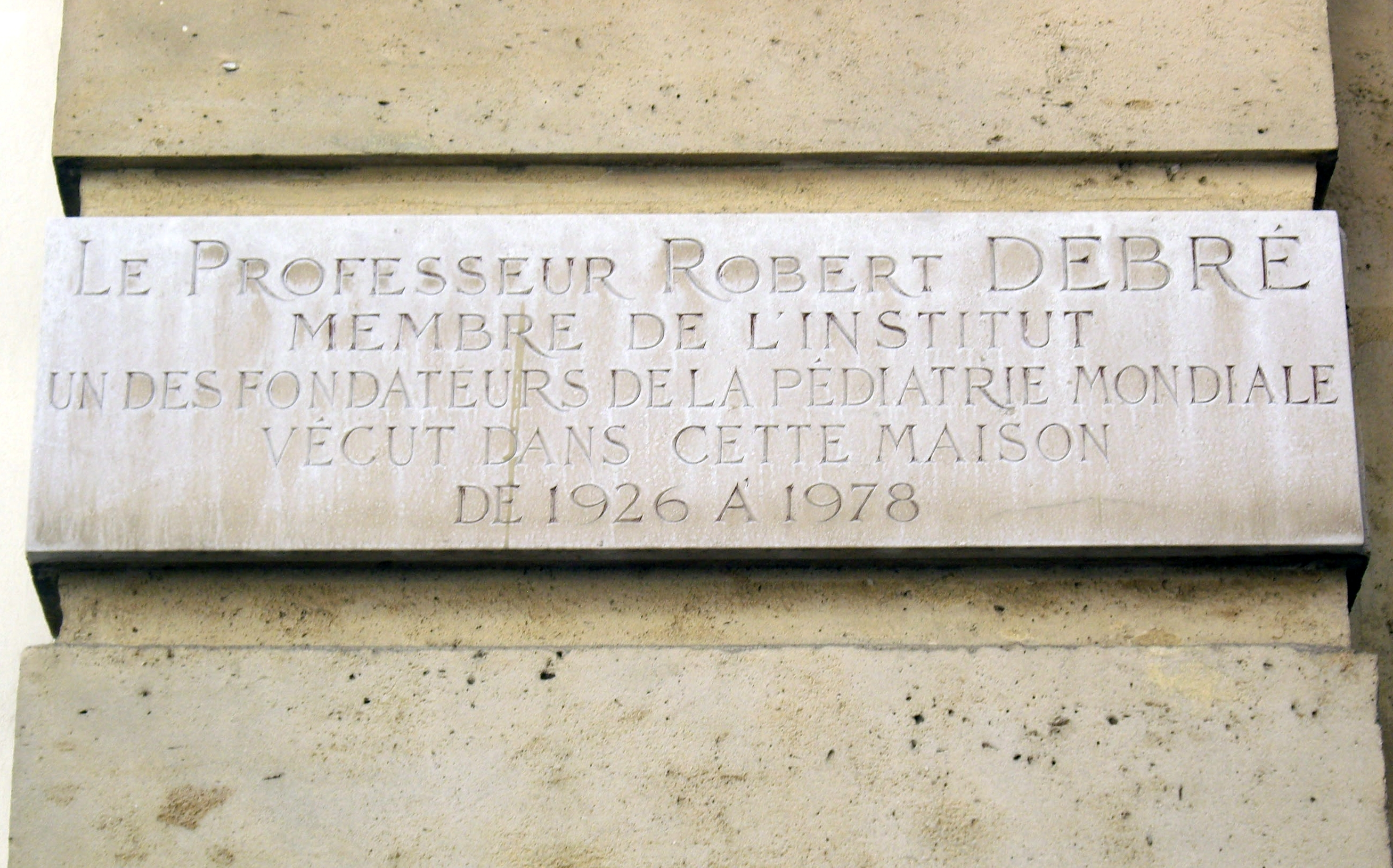
Robert Debré lived at no. 5 from 1926 to 1978.

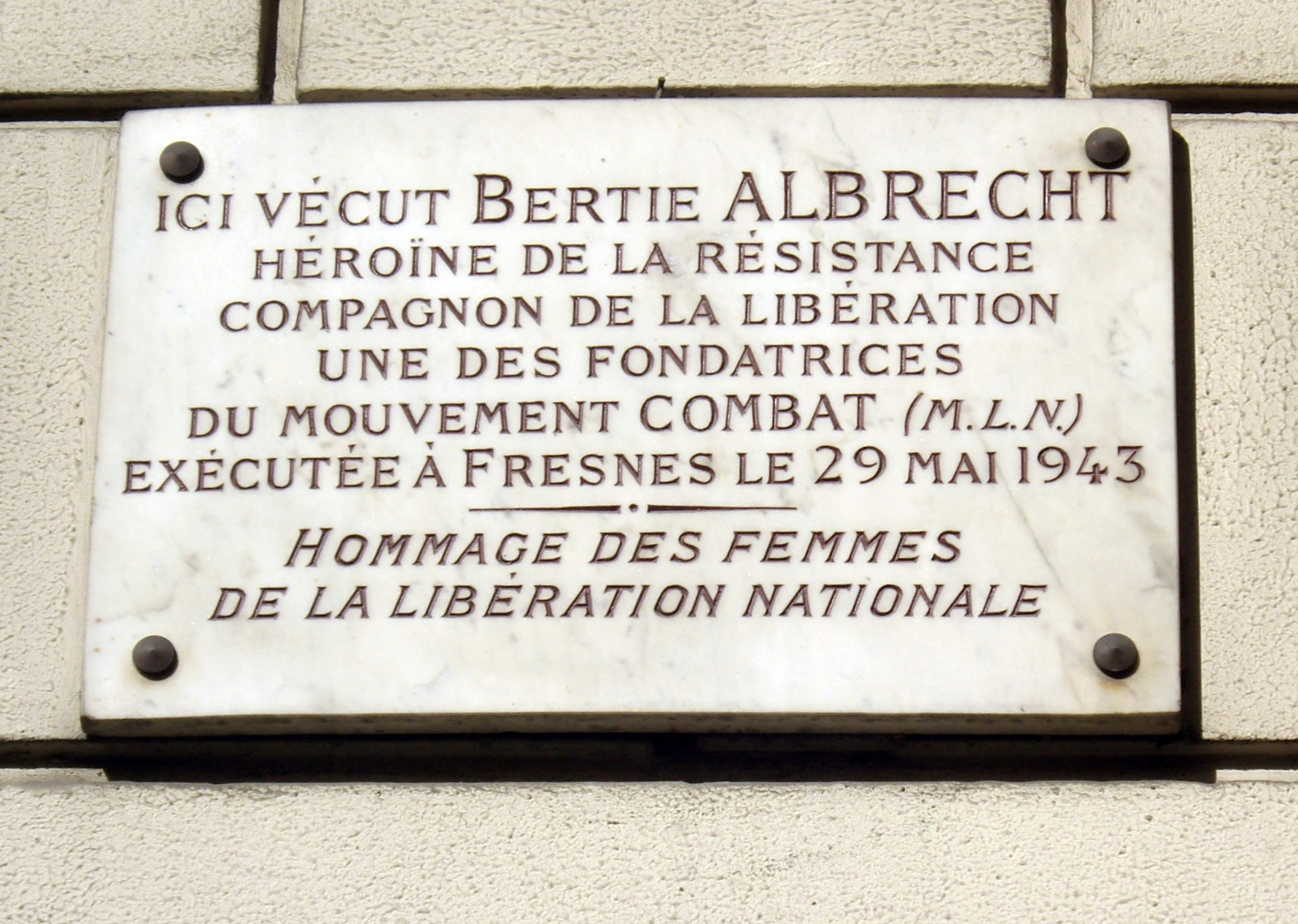
Berty Albrecht lived at no. 16.

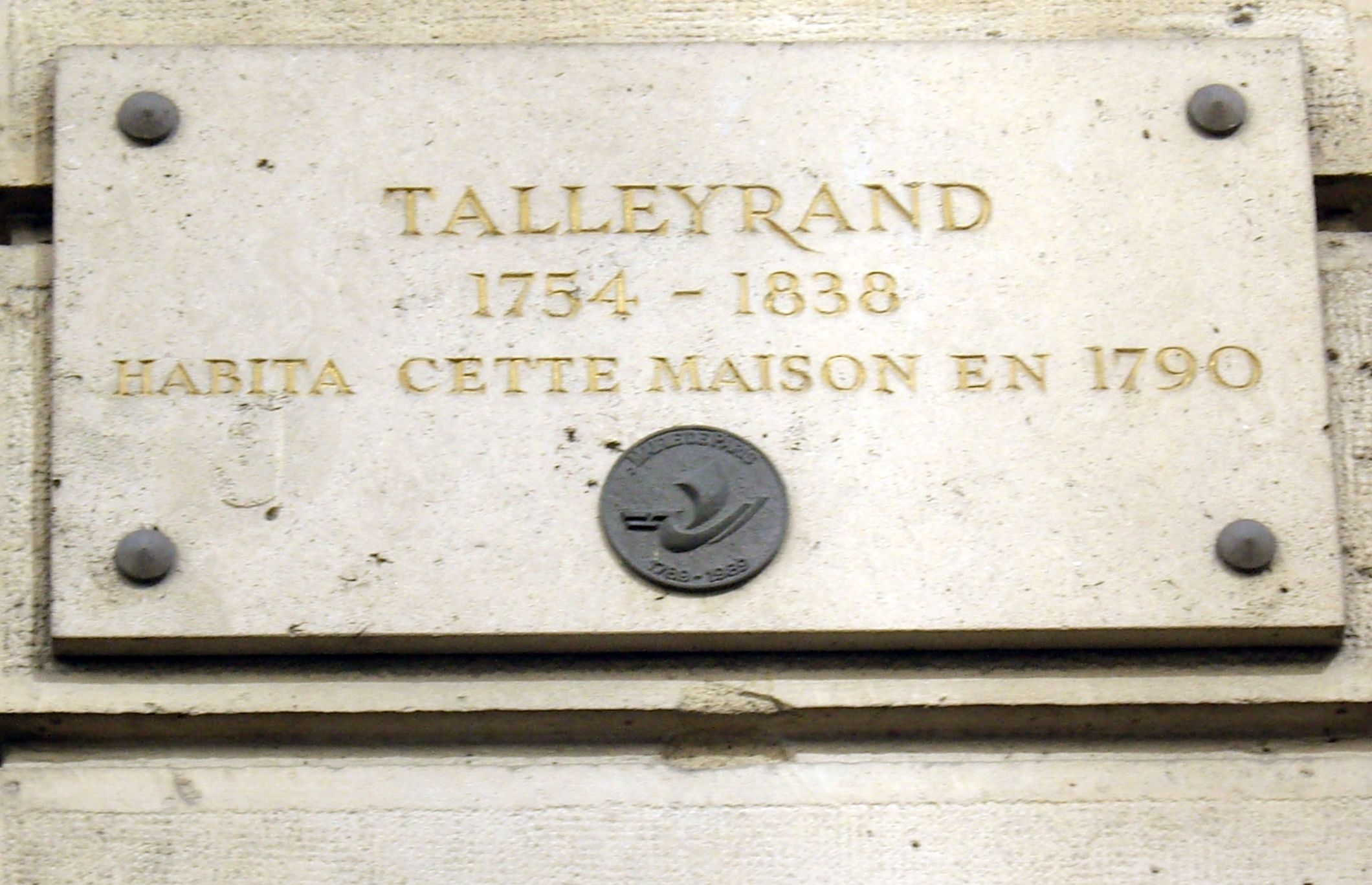
Talleyrand lived at no. 17 in 1790.

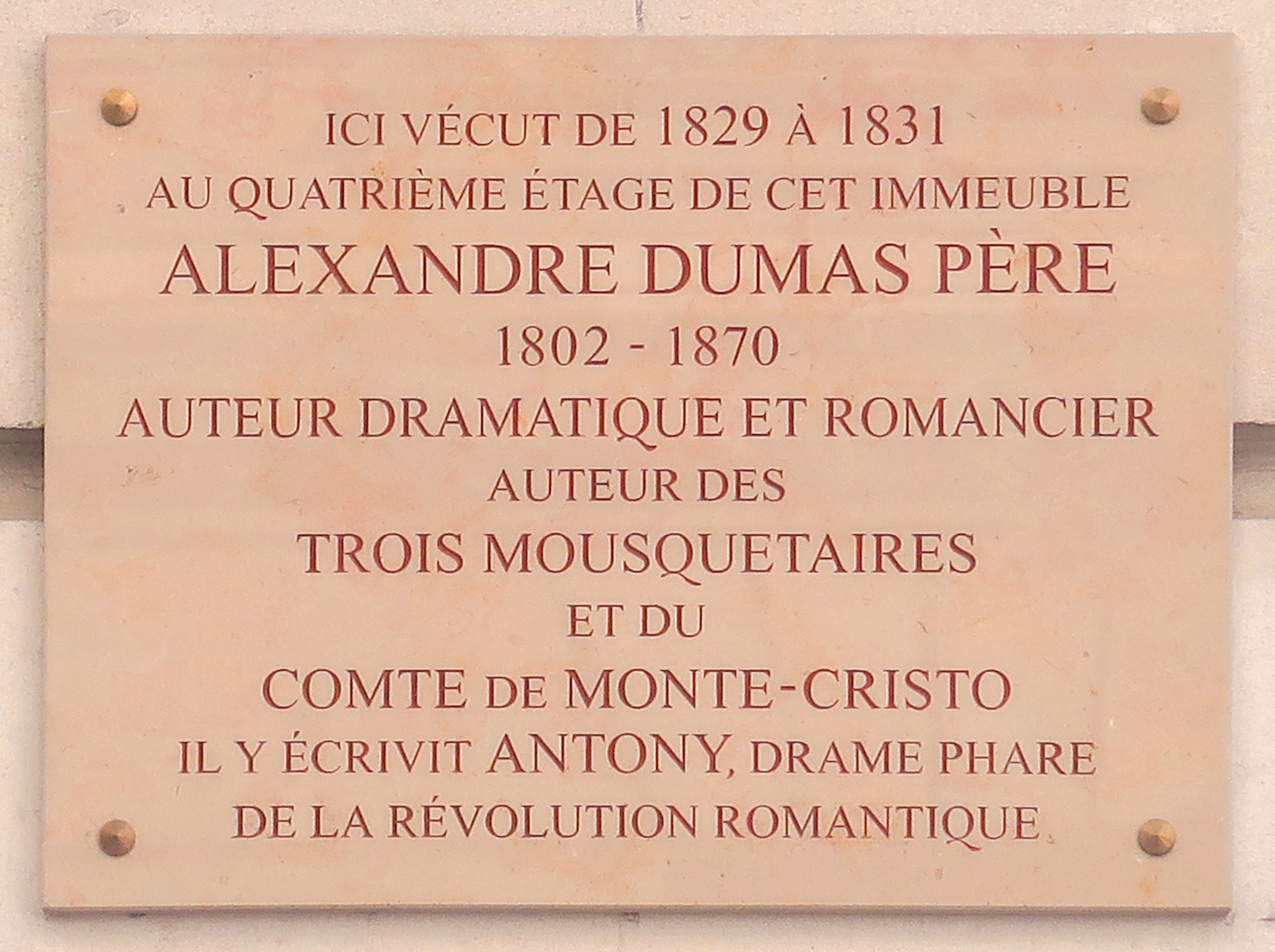
Alexandre Dumas lived in the street from 1829 to 1831.

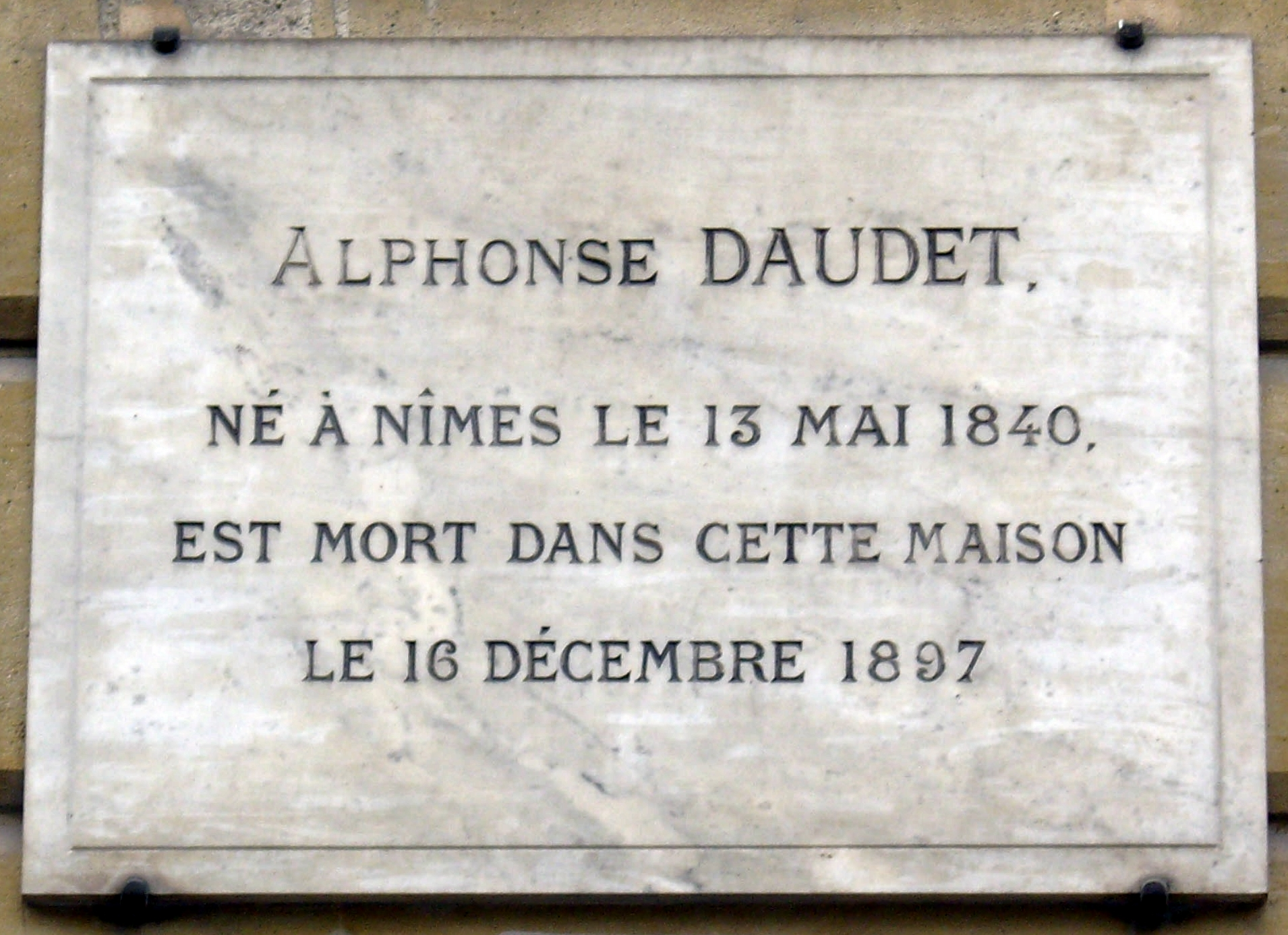
Alphonse Daudet died at no. 41 on 16 December 1897.

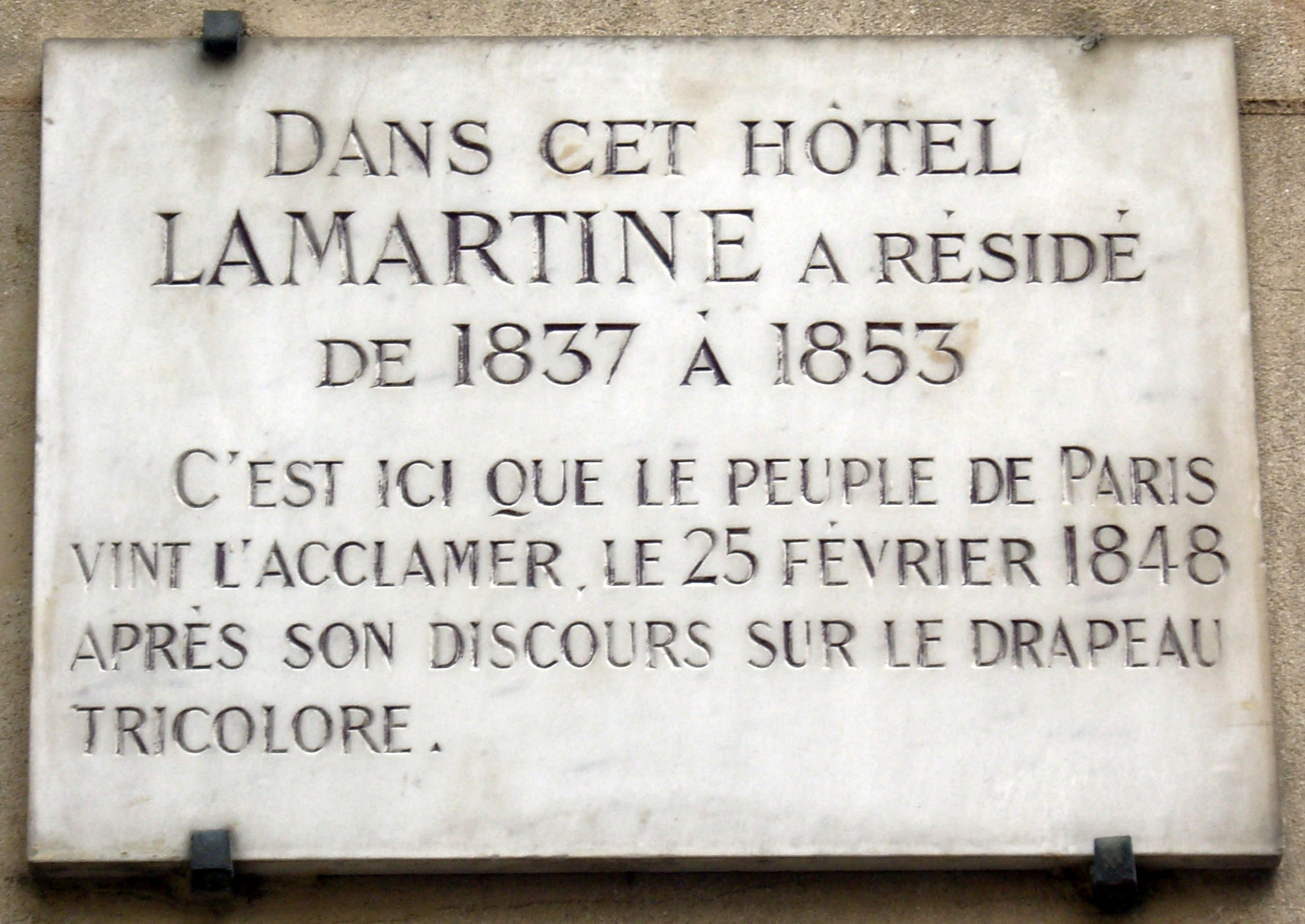
Lamartine resided at no. 82 from 1837 to 1853. It is where the people of Paris came to cheer for him on 25 February 1848, after his speech on the tricolour flag.

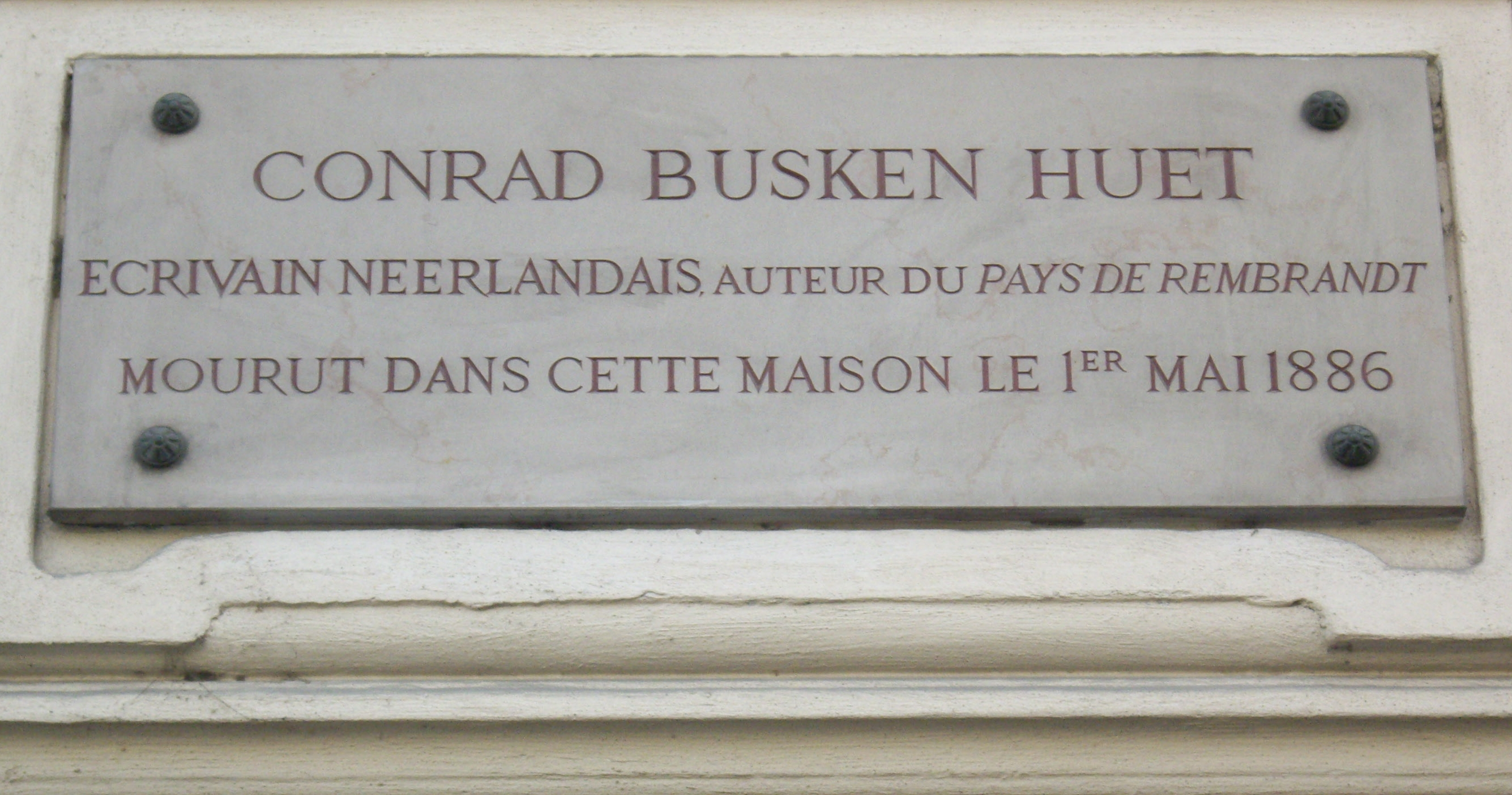
Conrad Busken Huet died at no. 107 on 1 May 1886.

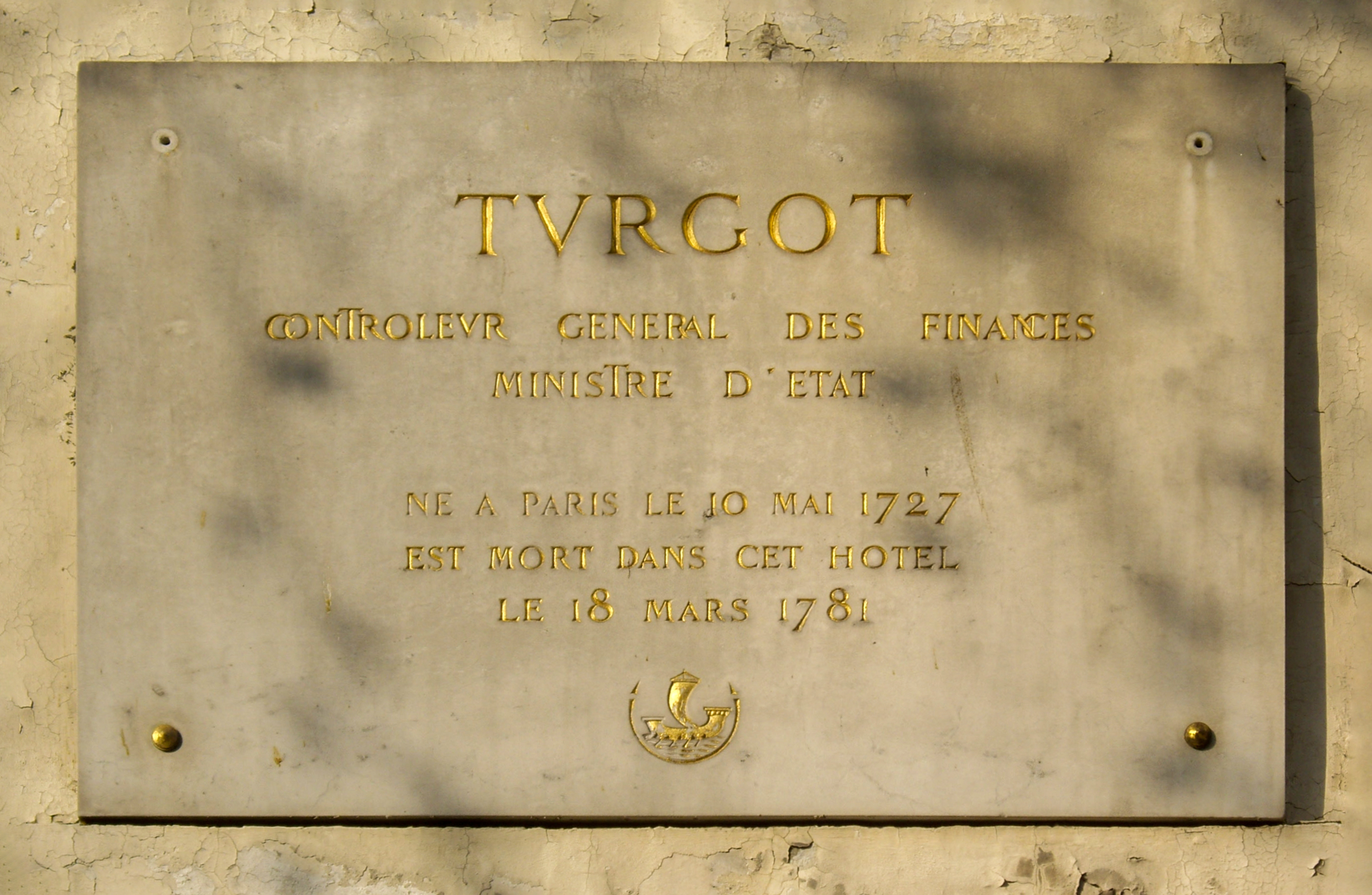
Turgot spent the end of his life at no. 108 and died there on 18 March 1781.

== Bibliography ==
- Jacques Hillairet, Dictionnaire historique des rues de Paris.
- Félix et Louis Lazare, Dictionnaire administratif et historique des rues de Paris et de ses monuments.
- Jean de La Tynna, Dictionnaire topographique, étymologique et historique des rues de Paris.
