= Saint-Germain Cemetery =

Former cemetery in Paris

Coordinates: 48°51′19″N 2°19′51″E

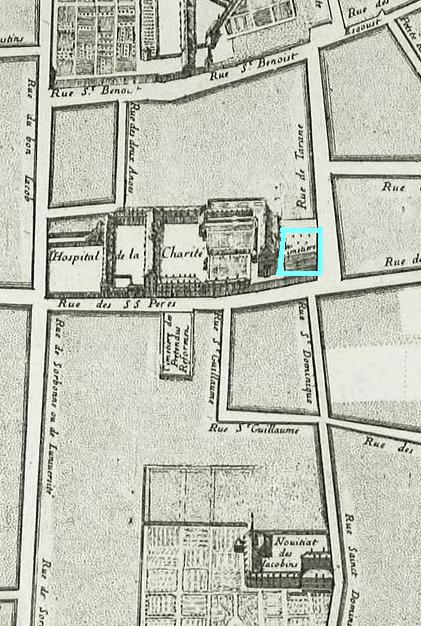
The cemetery site, shown on a map of the area

The Saint-Germain Cemetery (cimetière Saint-Germain) or Saint-Pierre Cemetery (cimetière Saint-Pierre) was a rectangular cemetery in Paris, first attested in 1259 (767 years ago) and used by Protestants from 1598 to 1604 onwards. It was located in the north-west corner of the former rue Taranne and rue des Saints-Pères, next to the Chapelle des Saint-Pères (on the site now occupied by Square de la Charité at 186 Boulevard Saint-Germain. It measured 27 toises by 8 toises (54 by 16 m (177 by 52 ft)). Its site is now covered by Square Taras-Chevtchenko.

Owned by the parish of Saint-Sulpice, it was used for the burial of plague victims and lepers until 1544. Article 45 of the Edict of Nantes noted it as one of two Protestant cemeteries in Paris (the other was La Trinité Cemetery). The parish council required them to leave it in 1604 and they moved to the nearby Saints-Pères Cemetery. The Hôpital de la Charité briefly used the cemetery from 1604 to 1609.

== Notable burials ==
- Claude Arnauld, un conseiller, notary and secretary to Henri IV, treasurer general to the généralité de Paris, died 1603.
- Monsieur de Rambouillet, one of the secretaries of Henri IV, died 1602.
- Sir Edward Herbert, attorney-general to King Charles I of England, died 1658.

== Bibliography (in French) ==
- Les cimetières protestants
- Les deux cents cimetières du Vieux Paris par Jacques Hillairet
- L'Oratoire du Louvre et les protestants parisiens par Philippe Braunstein
- Les morts, l'Église et l'État Par Jacqueline Thibaut-Payen
- Dictionnaire historique des rues de Paris by Jacques Hillairet
- Le cimetière Saint-Germain sur tombes-sepultures.com
