= Henri Testelin =

French painter and writer on art

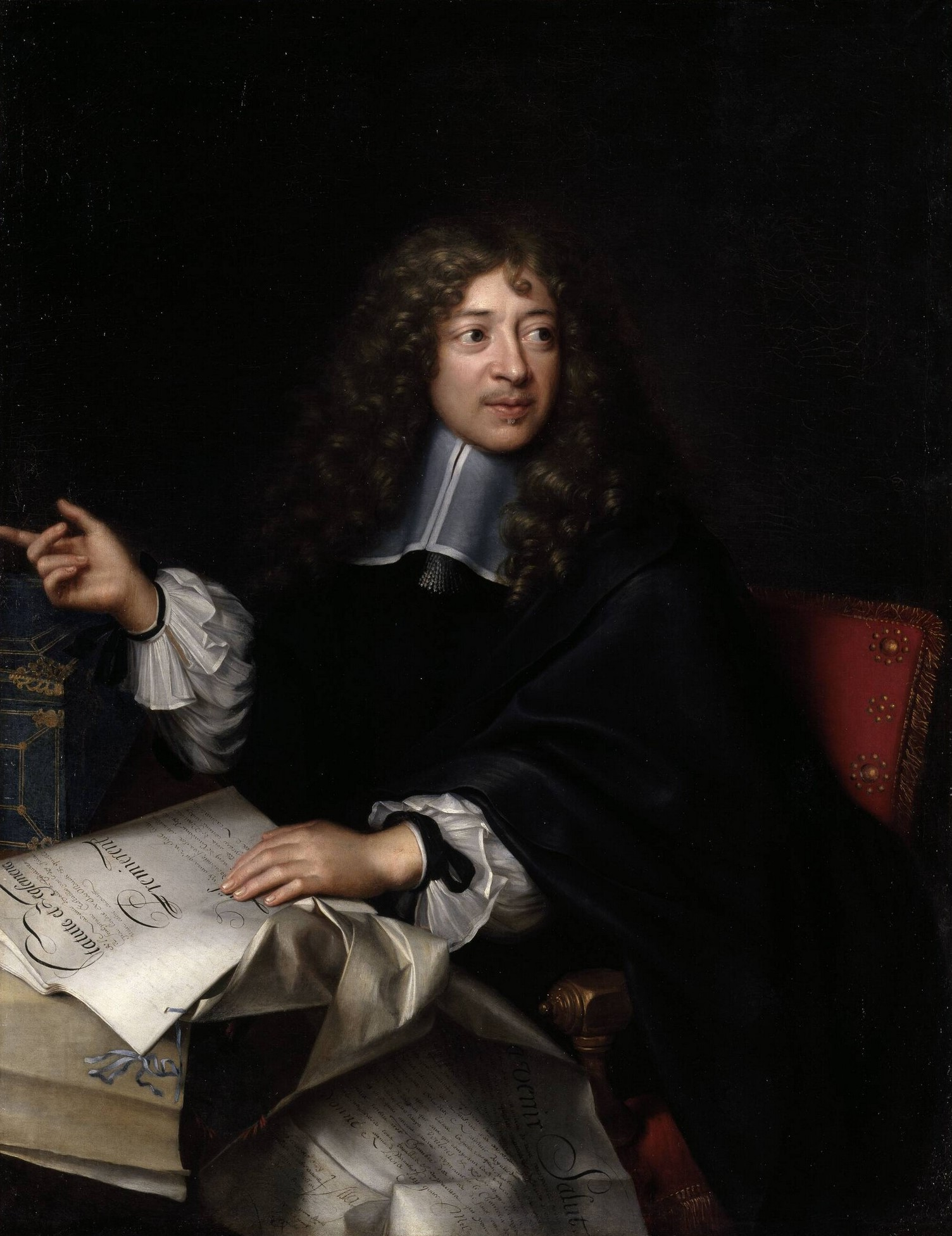
- Portrait by Jean Tiger, 1675
- Born: 1616; Paris, France
- Died: 17 April 1695 (aged 78–79); The Hague, Dutch Republic
- Occupation: Artist
- Known for: Portraits of French royalty

Henri Testelin (1616–1695) was a French painter and writer on art.

== Family ==
Testelin was born in Paris as the son of Gilles Testelin, painter to King Louis XIII. He was the younger brother of the painter Louis Testelin.

== Académy royale ==
In 1648, Henri Testelin became one of the founding members of the Académie royale de peinture et de sculpture. He succeeded his brother Louis as its secretary from 1650 and was nominated professor in 1656. In 1653, he suggested that academicians should regularly give lectures (Conférences) on art theory, a practice which was adopted and became a corner stone of the institution's activities.

Testelin's own lectures consisted of his reading of tables in which he summarised all the aspects of art theory his colleagues had previously presented. He published these tables in 1680 as Sentimens des plus habiles peintres sur la pratique de la peinture et sculpture, mis en tables de préceptes, avec plusieurs discours académiques, ou conférences tenues en l'Académie royale des dits arts. Reworked and expanded editions were published in The Hague in 1693 or 1694 and in Paris in 1696.

In 1853, French art historian Anatole de Montaiglon published the 17th-century manuscript Mémoires pour servir à l'histoire de l'Académie royale de Peinture et de Sculpture depuis 1648 jusqu'en 1664, a detailed account of the early history of the Académie royale, and identified the anonymous author as Henri Testelin.

== Exile ==
In line with the increasingly intolerant religious policies of Louis XIV, Testelin was dismissed from the Academy in 1681 because he was a Protestant. He left France and went into exile in Holland. He died in The Hague on 17 April 1695.

== Art ==
Henri Testelin painted portraits of Louis XIV and other important personalities. These show the influence of Charles Le Brun, Testelin's close friend.

Testelin was given living quarters at the Gobelins Manufactory for which he produced several cartoons for tapestry. These are mostly scenes from the life of Alexander the Great and Louis XIV based on compositions by Le Brun and the battle painter Adam Frans van der Meulen.

Most of his paintings are kept in the palace of Versailles.

=== Works by Testelin ===
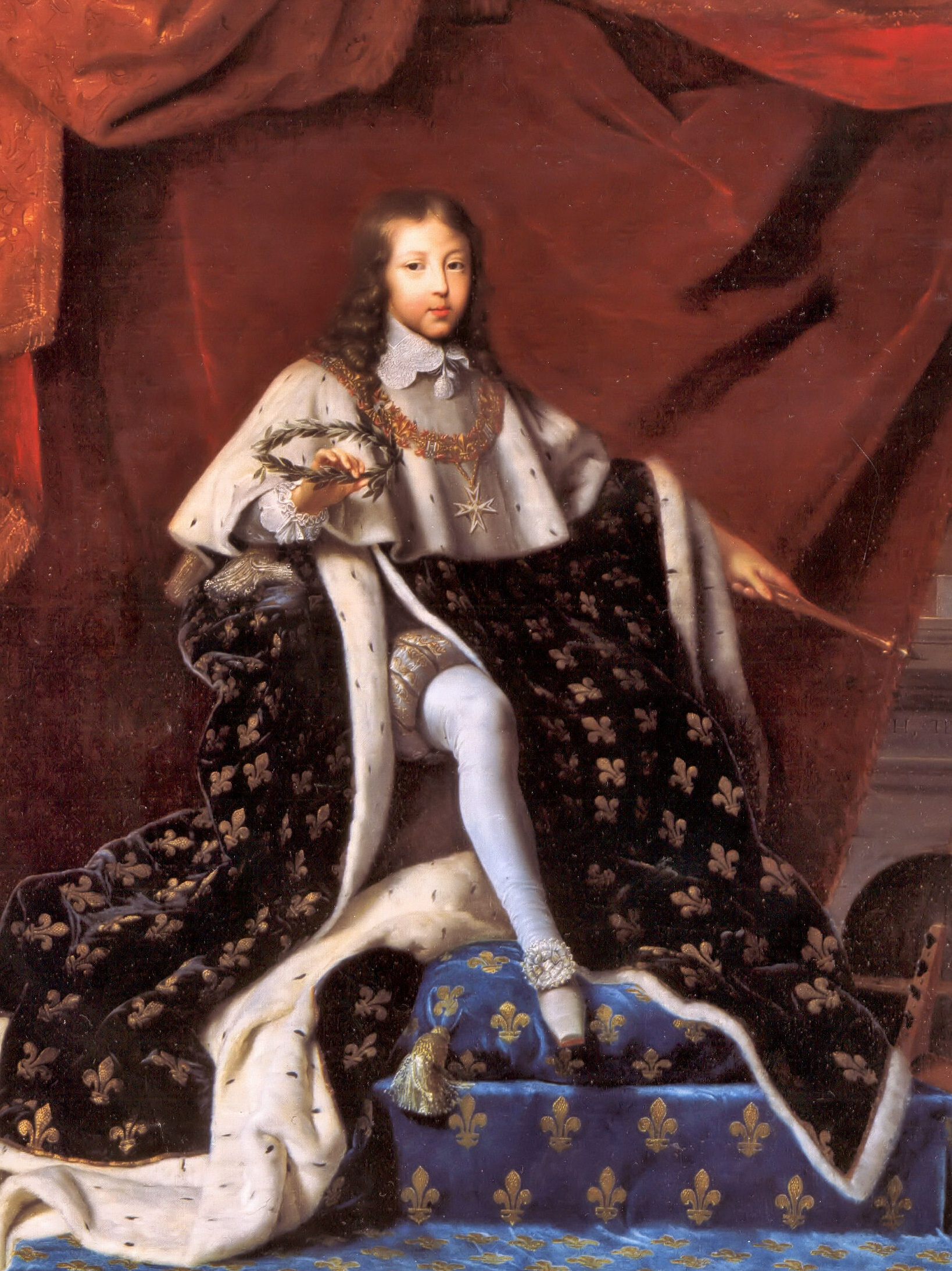
Louis XIV at the age of 10 (1648)

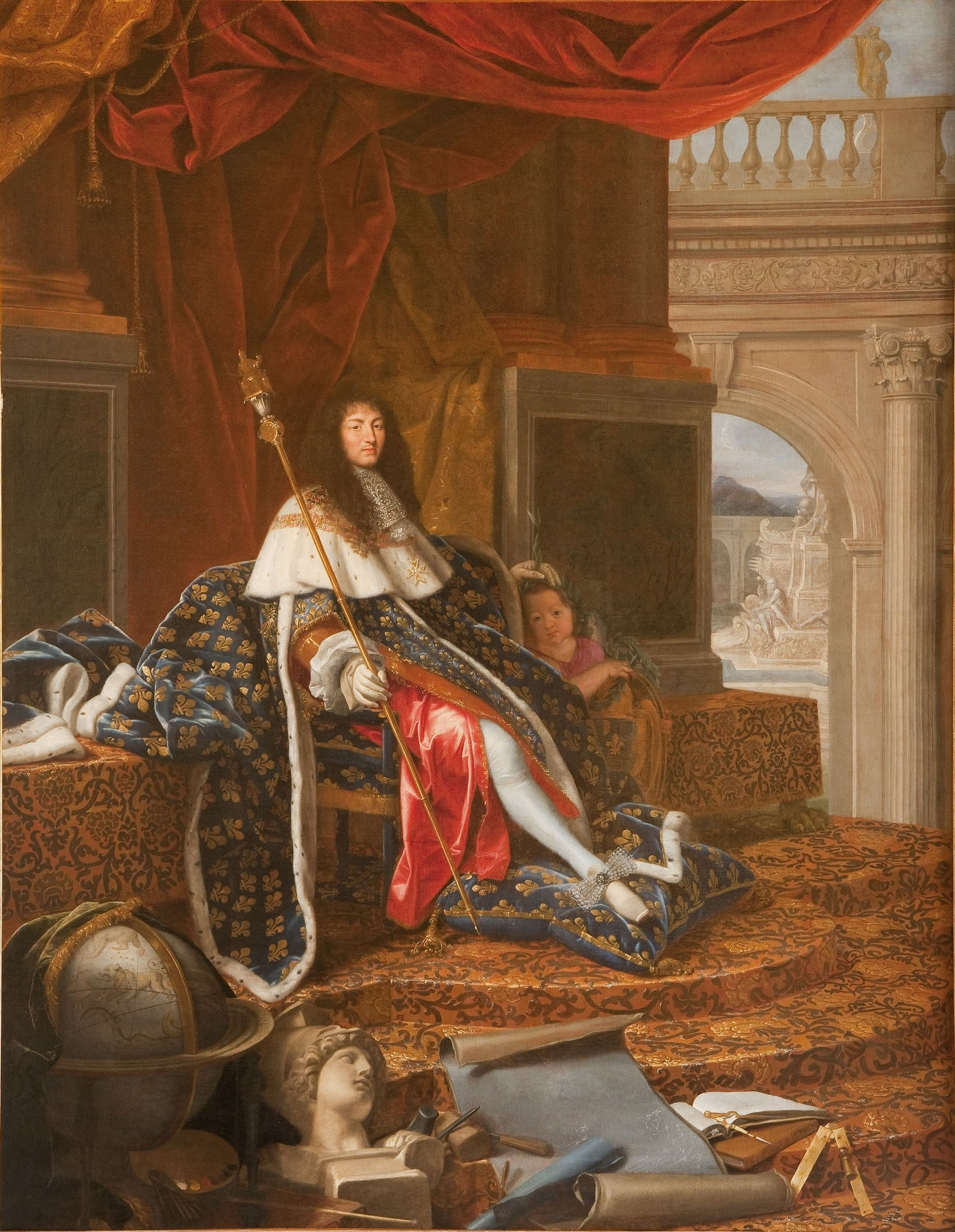
Louis XIV (1666-1668)

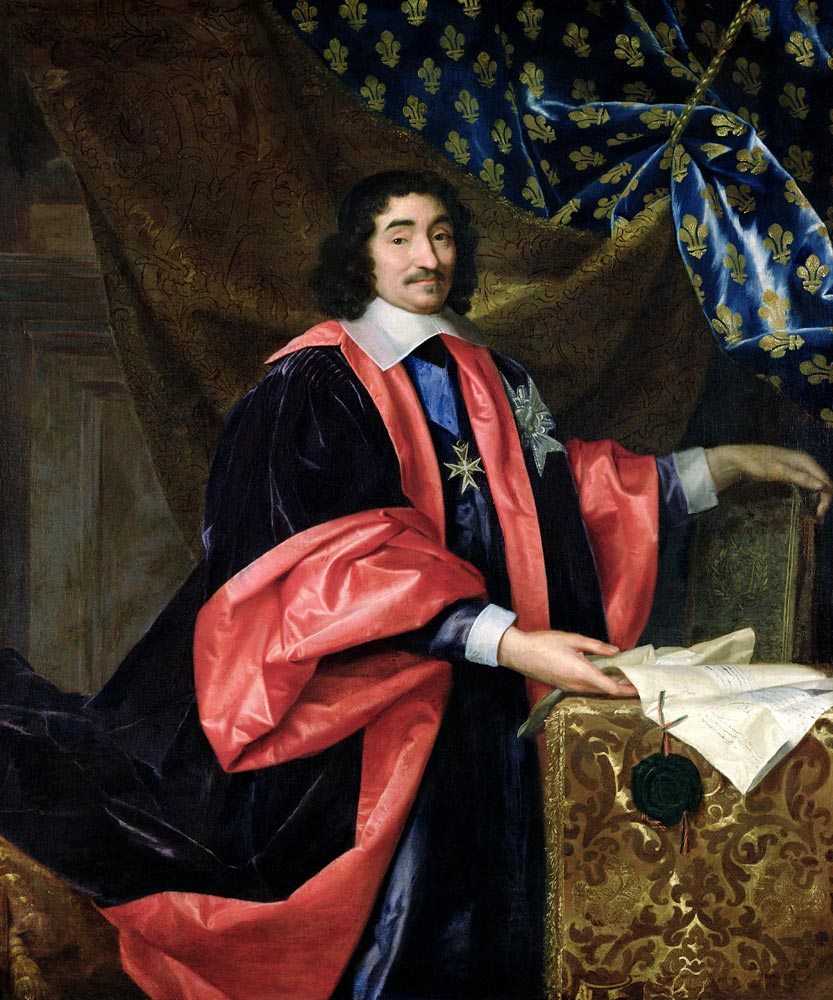
Pierre Seguier (1666-1668)

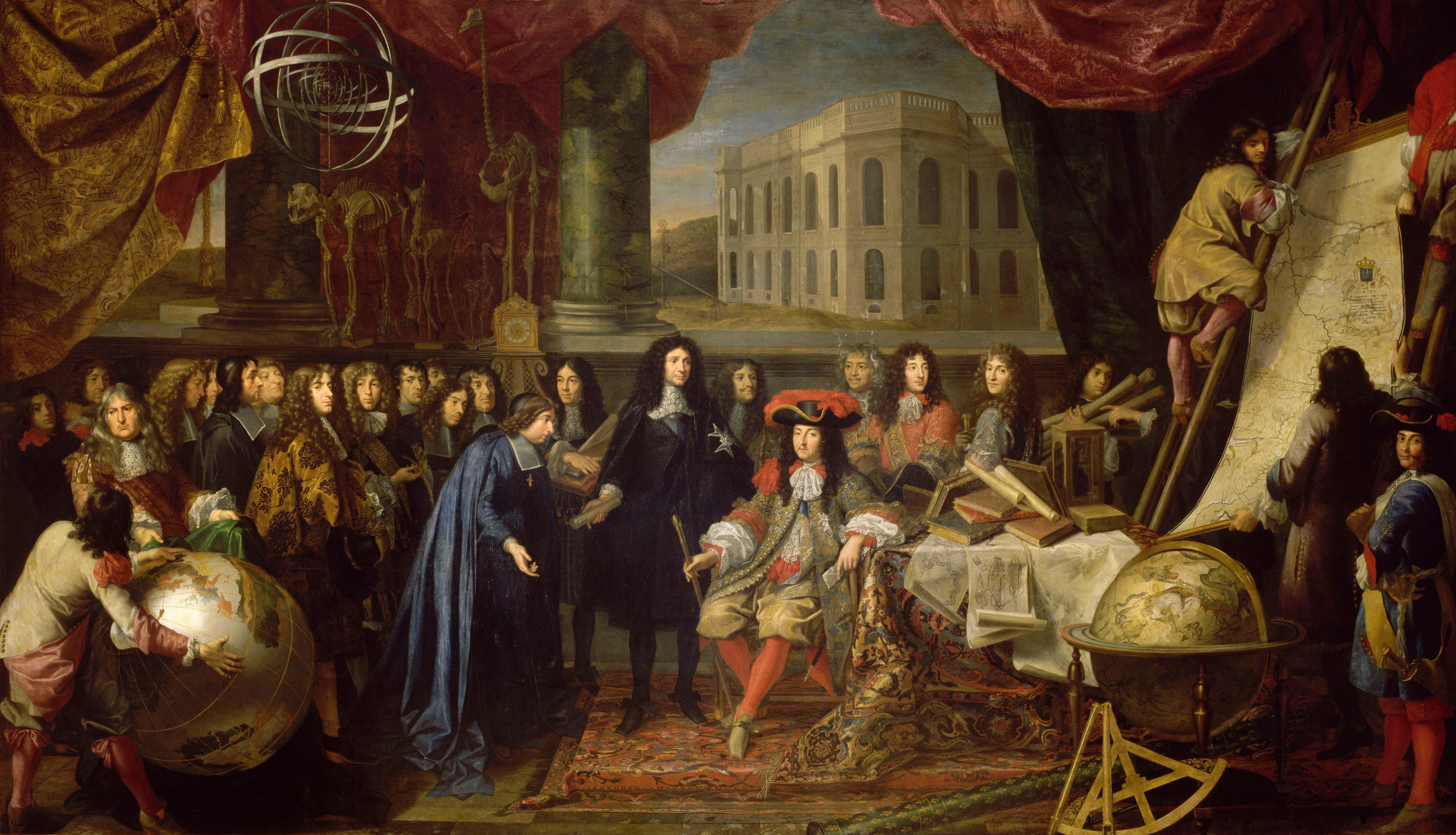
Foundation of the Académie de Sciences et l'Observatoire in 1666 (~ 1675)
