= Louis Testelin =

French painter

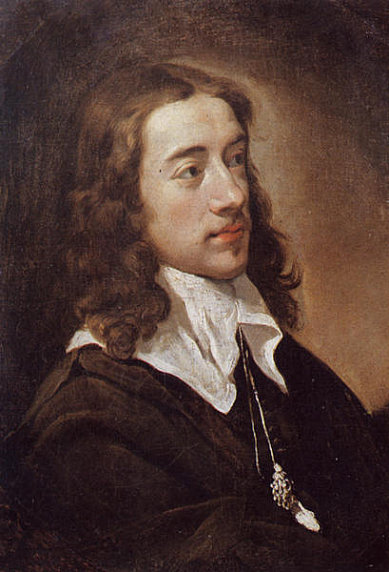
Testelin by Charles Le Brun, c.1648-50 (Louvre).

Louis Testelin (1615 – 1655) was a French painter.

== Life ==
He was the son of Gilles Testelin, king's painter to Louis XIII - this gave Gilles an ex officio home and studio in the Louvre. Louis' younger brother was the painter Henri Testelin, secretary to the Académie royale de peinture. His family was Protestant and Louis remained so until the end of his life, though this did not impede his career - he painted for Anne of Austria and accepted commissions from several monasteries in Paris.

He studied under Simon Vouet and became a friend of Charles Le Brun, who was working in the same studio. According to a biography edited by Georges Guillet de Saint-George, Testelin and Le Brun collaborated "on some paintings and decorative schemes" for the former church of Val-de-Grâce. He also painted the Mays for 1652 (Saint Peter Reviving the Widow Tabitha, now in the Musée des beaux-arts d'Arras) and 1655 (The Whipping of Saints Paul and Silas).

In 1648, Louis Testelin became one of the founder members of the Académie royale de peinture et de sculpture. In 1649, he was chosen as its secretary and one of its professors in 1650, a role he held until his death in 1655. He also produced satirical caricatures and ink wash paintings. He was buried in Paris's Saints-Pères Cemetery, a cemetery solely for Protestants.

== Works ==
- Saint Louis Nursing Plague Victims, 1654/1655, Musée de Grenoble.
- The Return of Gonesse, ink and wash, musée Sainte-Croix, Poitiers.

== Bibliography (in French) ==
- David Simonneau, « Louis Testelin, dessinateur », Rencontres de l'école du Louvre. Dessins français aux XVIIe et XVIIIe siècles, Paris, 2003, 169–183.
- Georges Guillet de Saint-George, notice sur Louis Testelin, in: Mémoires inédits sur la vie et les ouvrages des membres de l'Académie royale de peinture et de sculpture, J.B. Dumoulin, Paris, 1854, Volume 1, 216–228.
- Jean-Pierre Mouilleseaux, « Testelin Louis (1615-1655) - & Henri (1616-1695) », Encyclopædia Universalis
- « Louis Testelin (1615-1655) », notice du Musée virtuel du protestantisme
