= Pierre Scalberge =

French painter (1592–1640)

Pierre Scalberge (c. 1592 – 1640) was a French painter, engraver and art painter.

== Biography ==
Pierre Scalberge was born around 1592 in the Principality of Sedan. He was the son of Mathieu Scalberge, a painter in Paris, and Sarah Botté.

After a stay in Rome between 1618 and 1621, he was appointed ordinary painter to the king, then valet to the king in 1631.

In 1632, he set up a studio in the Louvre with his brother Frédéric Scalberge, where they painted five bays on the first beams and crossbeams of the pavilion at the end of the Grande galerie du Louvre.

In 1633, in addition to his brother, his wedding witnesses included, Abraham Bosse and Guillaume Berthelot. His brother also worked with Simon Vouet to paint the landscapes in some of his works.

He was buried on the 24th in the Saints-Pères Cemetery at the age of 48.
