= Saints-Pères Cemetery =

Defunct cemetery in Paris, France

Coordinates: 48°51′19″N 2°19′51″E

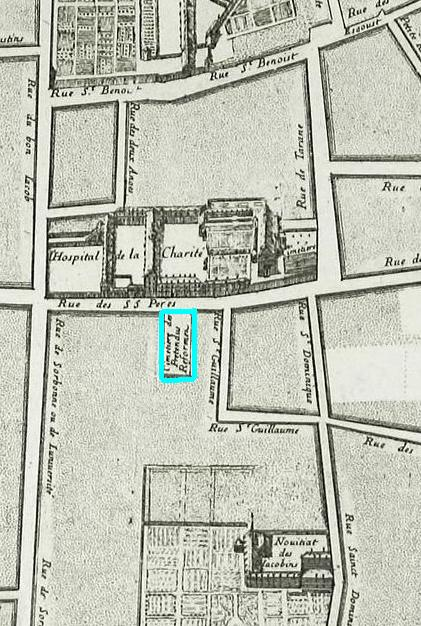
Site of the cemetery

Saints-Pères Cemetery (cimetière des Saints-Pères) is a historic cemetery in the 7th arrondissement of Paris, sited at what is now 30 rue des Saints-Pères.

After being forced to give up the Saint-Germain Cemetery in 1604, the Protestants of Paris bought a rectangular garden on the moulin du Pré-aux-Clercs mound on rue des Saints-Pères from Joachim Meurier, a master goldsmith from Île de la Cité. It was roughly 13 toise (24 m) by 23 toise (42 m). The first burials were on 21 March 1604 and the cemetery was used up until the Revocation of the Edict of Nantes in 1685, after which it was renamed Charité Cemetery (cimetière de la Charité) and used by the Hôpital de la Charité. It was enclosed by a 3m high wall and received at least one body a day. Like all the inner-city cemeteries, it was closed in 1785 by order of the inspector general of quarries Charles-Axel Guillaumot - the contents of its tombs and charnel houses and its burials at a depth of at least 100m were transferred to the new Catacombs of Paris, a set of re-used quarries on what is now Rue de la Tombe-Issoire.

== Selected burials ==
- Members of the Caus, Conrart, Duberceau, La Planche, Gobelins and Rambouillet families
- Jacques II Androuet du Cerceau († 1614)
- Barthélemy de Brosse (architecte)
- Jacob Bunel († 1614)
- Isaac de Caus († 1648)
- Valentin Conrart († 1675)
- Barthélemy Prieur († 1611)
- Marthe Renaudot († 1639), wife of Théophraste Renaudot
- Louis Testelin (1615–1655), painter

== Bibliography (in French) ==
- Les cimetières protestants
- Les deux cents cimetières du Vieux Paris par Jacques Hillairet
- L'Oratoire du Louvre et les protestants parisiens par Philippe Braunstein
- Les morts, l'Église et l'État Par Jacqueline Thibaut-Payen
- Dictionnaire historique des rues de Paris by Jacques Hillairet
