= Francesco Antonio Soria =

Italian writer

Francesco Antonio Soria (1730 – 1799) was an Italian writer. He is best known for a biographical dictionary of Neapolitan historians: Memorie storico-critiche degli storici napolitani (1781–1782, Naples).

He was born in Naples and became a priest. He also published some hagiographies and translated Georges Guillet de Saint-George's history of the reign of Mehmed the Conqueror.

== Works ==
- Storia del regno di Maometto II. Imperadore de' Turchi. 2 vols. Naples: nella stamperia Simoniana. 1781.
- Memorie storico-critiche degli storici napolitani. Vol. 1. Naples: nella stamperia Simoniana. 1781.
- Memorie storico-critiche degli storici napolitani. Vol. 2. Naples: nella stamperia Simoniana. 1782.
