= Simon Guillain =

French sculptor

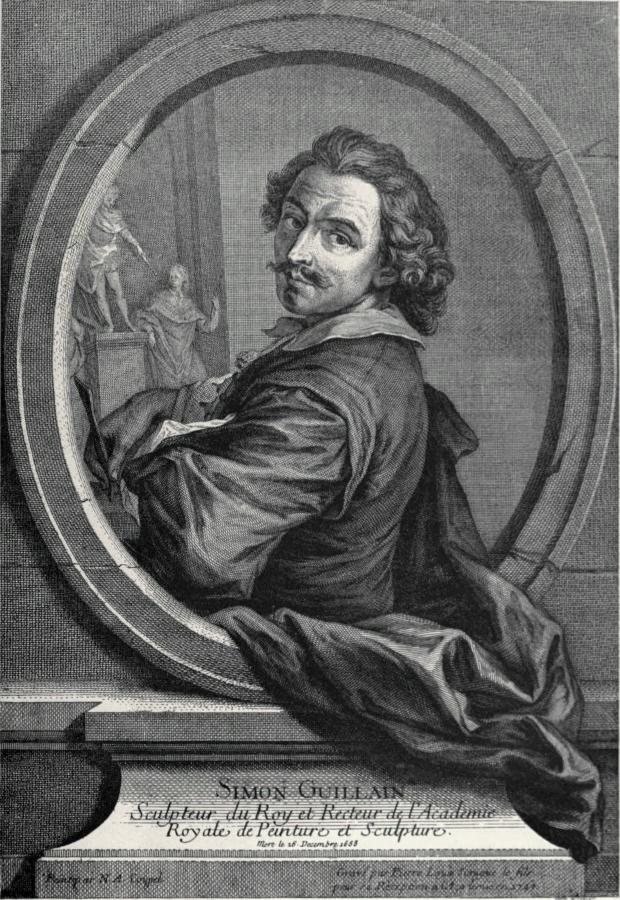
Posthumous portrait after Noël-Nicolas Coypel

Simon Guillain, called Gigantibus or de Gigante (Paris, 1581 - Paris, 1658), was a French sculptor.

== Biography ==
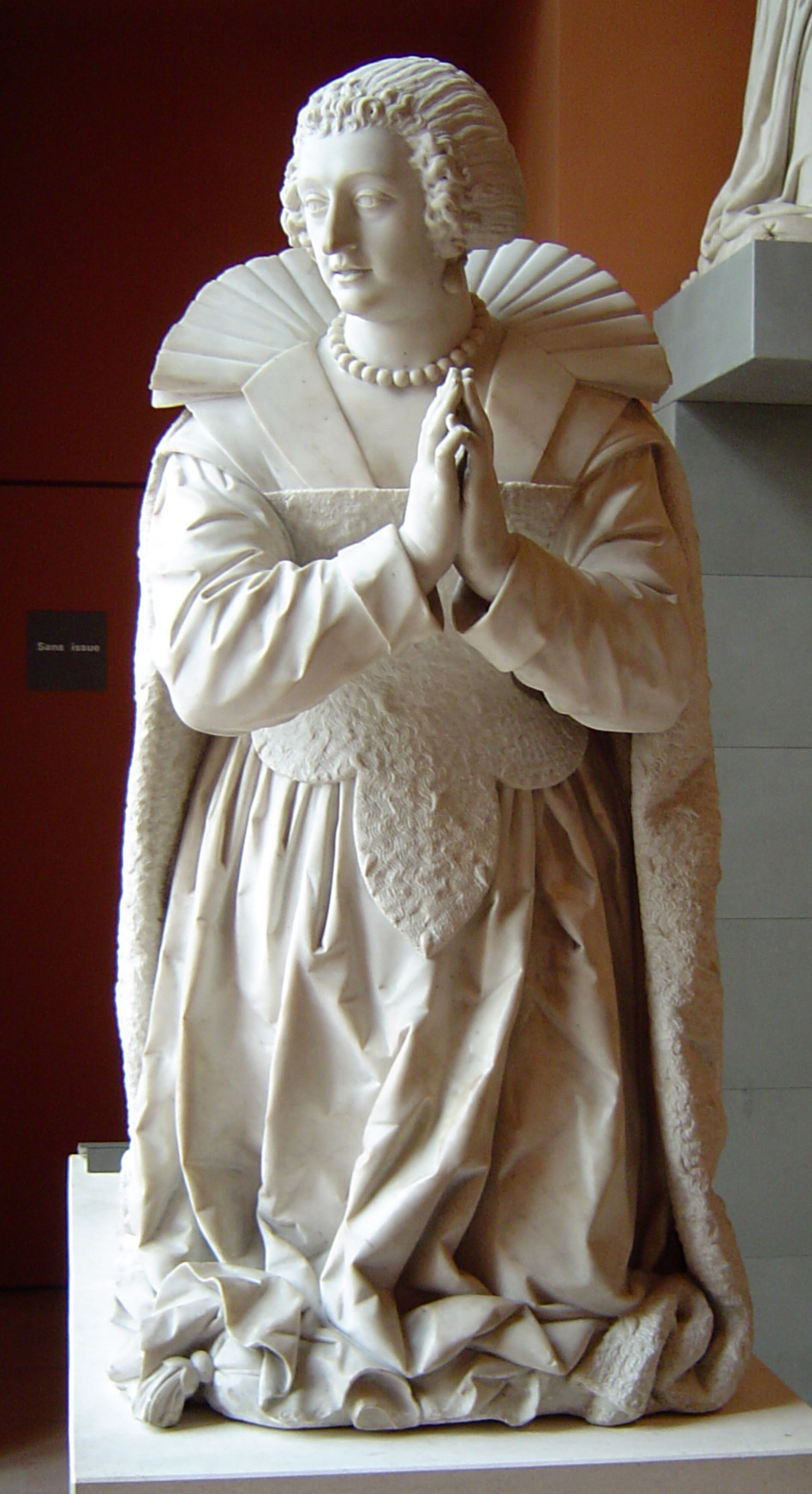
Funerary Monument of Charlotte Catherine de La Trémoille, 1629, Louvre Museum

He approached sculpting thanks to the teachings of his father Nicolas, perfecting later at the Academy of court.

His stay in Rome at the beginning of the seventeenth century reinforced his interest in art, which Guillain expressed in works of great importance, such as the two statues of Saint Gervasius and Protasius for the church of Saint Gervais in Paris, some marble statues for the church of the Sorbonne, the Mausoleum of Charlotte Catherine, widow of the prince of Condé in the convent of the Daughters of the Ave Maria.

During his stay in Rome, Guillin made a copy of the Arts by way of Bologna: eighty etchings from drawings by Annibale Carracci, as well as a frontispiece adorned with a portrait of Annibale Carracci. The frontispiece of the work is as follows: Diverse Figure, al numero di ottanta, disegnato di penna, nell'hore di ricreazione di Annibale Carracci, intagliate in rame, e cavate dai originali da Simone Guilino Parigino. Dedicate a tutti i Virtuosi ed intendenti della professione della pittura e del disegno, A Roma nella stamparia di Lodovico Grignani, MDCXLVI, Con licenza di superiori, In foglio.

But his name has entered the history of sculpture above all for the colossal Monument to the glory of Louis XIII and his family, completed in 1648, coinciding with the Treaty of Westphalia, and placed at the entrance to the Pont-au-Change on the Seine.

The work consisted of a double architectural order and was decorated with coats of arms, trophies, animal and human figures as a corollary to the main bronze statues of Louis XIII of France, Queen Anne of Austria, and Louis XIV of France as an infant.

Guillain drew characters that he admired.

Every detail of his works was imbued with classicism, without detracting from the personal and genuine characterization of some specific aspects, such as the faces. He was a renewer of the French Renaissance.

He was elected captain of his district and in 1651 was one of the founders of the Royal Academy of Painting and Sculpture in Paris.

== Other projects ==
- Wikimedia Commons contiene immagini o altri file su Simon Guillain
