= Académie royale de peinture et de sculpture =

French art academy

Coordinates: 48°51′26″N 2°20′13″E

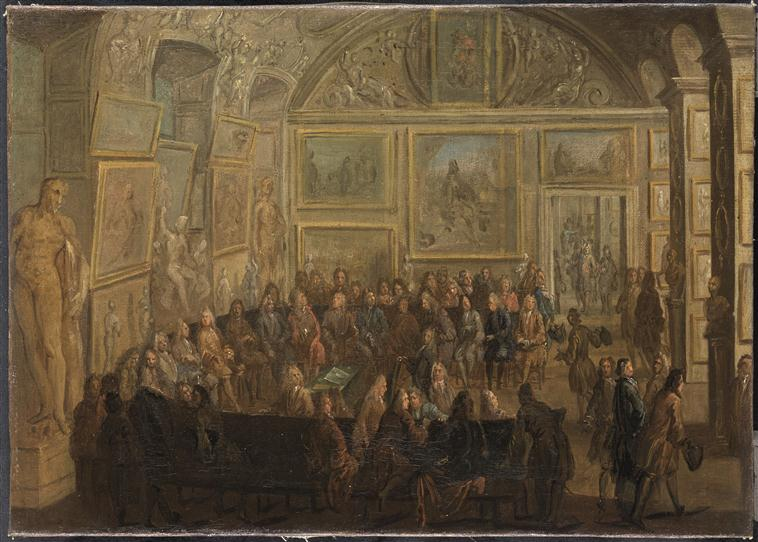
A meeting of the Académie royale de peinture et de sculpture at the Louvre Palace (c. 1712–21) by Jean-Baptiste Martin

The Embarkation for Cythera, 1717, was Antoine Watteau's reception piece for the Académie royale de peinture et de sculpture.

The Académie royale de peinture et de sculpture (French: [akademi ʁwajal də pɛ̃tyʁ e də skyltyʁ]; English: "Royal Academy of Painting and Sculpture") was founded in 1648 in Paris, France. It was the premier art institution of France during the latter part of the Ancien Régime until it was abolished in 1793 during the French Revolution. It included most of the important painters and sculptors, maintained almost total control of teaching and exhibitions, and afforded its members preference in royal commissions.

== Founding ==
In the 1640s, France's artistic life was still based on the medieval system of guilds like the Académie de Saint-Luc which had a tight grip on the professional lives of artists and artisans alike. Some artists had managed to get exemptions but these were based on favoritism rather than merit.

According to the 17th century Mémoires about the founding of the Académie royale, a few "superior men" who were "real artists", (Note: "hommes supérieurs, véritables gens d'art par la beauté et l'élévation de leur génie, la richesse de leurs talents, la noblesse de leurs sentiments, et par leur amour sincère pour l'accroissement des belles connoissances et la gloire du nom françois") suffered and felt humiliated under the guild system.

In view of increasing pressure by the Parisian guilds for painters and sculptors to submit to their control, the young but already very successful painter Charles Le Brun conceived a plan to free those he considered to be true artists from the humiliating influence of mere artisans. He involved his two close friends, the brothers Louis and Henri Testelin, to lobby for an independent organisation where membership was based on merit alone, following the examples of the Accademia delle Arti del Disegno in Florence and the Accademia di San Luca in Rome.

Soon, the courtier Martin de Charmois and several more artists became involved and drafted a petition for the foundation of the Académie. Charmois assembled as many artists with royal patronage as he could to sign it, which a great number did. With the support of Le Brun's patron Pierre Séguier, Chancellor of France, Charmois presented the petition to the nine-year-old King Louis XIV, his mother Anne of Austria who acted as regent and the whole Royal Council on 20 January 1648 at the Palais-Royal. All present approved and the foundation of the Académie royale was granted.

The promoters immediately got to work and in January 1648 formulated statutes with 13 articles (approved in February and published on 9 March 1648), a key element of which was a public art school. (Note: "Status et Règlements de l'Académy Royale de Peinture et Sculpture du mois de Febvrier 1648.") There were 22 founding members, (Note: "Georges Guillet de Saint-George calls Louis Testelin "L'un des dix académiciens, qui, avec les douze anciens ou professeurs, ont jeté les fondements de l'Académie royale de peinture et de sculpture." (Mémoire historique des principaux ouvrages de peinture de Louis Testelin)) who, in February 1648, elected 12 anciens (elders), who would be in charge of the academy in turn, each for a calendar month. These first anciens were the painters Charles Le Brun, Charles Errard, François Perrier, Juste d' Egmont, Michel I Corneille, Henri Beaubrun, Laurent de La Hyre, Sebastien Bourdon, Eustache Le Sueur and the sculptors Simon Guillain, Jacques Sarazin and Gerard van Opstal. (Note: The content of the pages 35–36 makes it clear that those twelve were elected out of a larger pool of original members for the purpose of running the academy.) There is a common misconception that "there were twelve founders" and that all of the original members were called anciens, but this is not correct. (Note: Both quoted from Katharine Baetjer, for details have a look into her book linked here in the "further reading" section below; "French Paintings in The Metropolitan Museum of Art from the Early Eighteenth Century through the Revolution", but there are numerous other examples for this misunderstanding.)

Charmois was elected Chef (Head) of the Académy as stated in article XIII of the statutes.

With revised statutes from 24 December 1654 the offices of chancelier and of four recteurs were created, and the title ancien was abandoned in favour of the title professeur (with the exact same duties for a calendar month in turn).

== Vice-protectorate of Jean-Baptiste Colbert ==
Following the death of the Protecteur of the Académie royale, Cardinal Mazarin, in 1661, the office reverted to his predecessor Chancellor Séguier. Later that year, Séguier named Jean-Baptiste Colbert, King Louis XIV's trusted minister, as Vice-protecteur. Colbert took full strategic control and, working through Charles Le Brun, ensured that the arts were devoted to the glorification of the King. A "royal style" was enforced which in practice meant a classical style.

== Dominance of Charles Le Brun ==
The Académie experienced its greatest power during the involvement of Charles Le Brun who, from its beginnings in 1648 until his death in 1690 occupied many positions within the Académie. After being an original ancien, in 1655 he was the first to be appointed chancellor of the Académie (from 1663 chancellor for life), then he became rector from 1668 and director from 1683. Despite his short seven-year reign as director, Le Brun controlled a majority of decisions within the Académie. In February 1675 he ordered that no decision would be validated in the Académie without his approval.

Le Brun's involvement in the Académie and his position of first painter to the king, allowed him to dictate all painting, sculpture, and tapestry expectations. Specifically, for projects such as the Grande Galerie du Louvre, Académie artists found themselves carrying out designs originated by Le Brun. In addition, Le Brun admitted more members into the Académie than during any other comparable time period. Between 1664 and 1683, 107 artists became members of the Académie. In comparison, 89 artists were admitted between 1707 and 1720, and the 57 admitted in 1735–54. Under Le Brun's influence the Académie became more accessible than ever before.

Le Brun's relationship with the royal court allowed him to assume the position of director after the death of Colbert in 1683. While still extremely influential, Le Brun began to lose power due to the rise of Pierre Mignard, in the years before his death in 1690.

== Suspension ==
On 8 August 1793 the Académie was suspended by the revolutionary National Convention, when the latter decreed the abolition of "all academies and literary societies patented or endowed by the Nation" ("toutes les académies et sociétés littéraires patentées ou dotées par la Nation").

== Later history ==
It was later revived as the Académie de peinture et de sculpture after the French Revolution. This Académie is also responsible for the Académie de France in the villa Médicis in Rome (founded in 1666) which allows promising artists to study in Rome. In 1816, it was merged with the Académie de Musique (Academy of Music, founded in 1669) and the Académie d'Architecture (Academy of Architecture, founded in 1671), to form the Académie des Beaux-Arts, one of the five academies of the Institut de France.

== Documentation ==
=== Mémoires ===
The history of the early Académie royale is given in great detail by a contemporary who was involved in its foundation. The 17th century manuscript containing the account was published in 1853 by the French art historian Anatole de Montaiglon as

Mémoires pour servir à l'histoire de l'Académie royale de Peinture et de Sculpture depuis 1648 jusqu'en 1664, Paris 1853

Montaiglon has identified the anonymous author as Henri Testelin, the academy's secretary from 1650 to 1681, but different names have been suggested by others.

=== Procès-verbaux ===
In addition to the Mémoires Montaiglon also published the minutes of the academy in ten volumes from 1875 to 1892:

Procès-verbaux de l'Académie royale de peinture et de sculpture
| Vol. 1 (1875): 1648–1672 | Vol. 2 (1878): 1673–1688 | Vol. 3 (1880): 1689–1704 |
| Vol. 4 (1881): 1705–1725 | Vol. 5 (1883): 1726–1744 | Vol. 6 (1885): 1745–1755 |
| Vol. 7 (1886): 1756–1768 | Vol. 8 (1888): 1769–1779 | Vol. 9 (1889): 1780–1788 |
Vol. 10 (1892): 1789–1793

Index to all 10 volumes of the Procès-verbaux, edited by Paul Cornu, Paris 1909:
Table des Procès-verbaux de l'Académie royale de peinture et de sculpture, 1648-1793

=== Conférences ===
From 2006 to 2015, a critical edition of the Conférences held at the Académie royale was published by Jacqueline Lichtenstein and Christian Michel as a collaborative Project of the German Center for Art History, the Académie des Beaux-Arts and the École Nationale Supérieure des Beaux-Arts in Paris and made available online:

Conférences de l'Académie royale de Peinture et de Sculpture
| Tome I: Les Conférences au temps d'Henry Testelin 1648-1681 (2006) | Vol. 1 | Vol. 2 | |
| Tome II: Les Conférences au temps de Guillet de Saint Georges 1682-1699 (2008) | Vol. 1 | Vol. 2 | |
Tome III: Les Conférences au temps de Jules Hardouin-Mansart 1699-1711 (2009)
| Tome IV : Les Conférences entre 1712 et 1746 (2010) | Vol. 1 | Vol. 2 | |
| Tome V : Les Conférences au temps de Charles-Antoine Coypel 1747-1752 (2012) | Vol. 1 | Vol. 2 | |
| Tome VI : Les Conférences entre 1752-1792 (2015) | Vol. 1 | Vol. 2 | Vol. 3 |

== See also ==
- Academic art
- French art salons and academies
- List of members of the Académie Royale de Peinture et de Sculpture

== Bibliography ==
- Brosnan, Kelsey (2016). "Vigée Le Brun: Woman Artist in Revolutionary France". Nineteenth-Century Art Worldwide, vol. 15, no. 3 (16 October). doi:10.29411/ncaw.2016.15.3.16.
- Burchard, Wolf (2016). The Sovereign Artist: Charles Le Brun and the Image of Louis XIV. London: Paul Holberton Publishing. ISBN 1911300059.
- Montaiglon, Anatole de; Cornu, M. Paul (1875). Table Procès-Verbaux de l'Académie royale de peinture et de sculpture, 1648-1793 [Table Minutes of the Royal Academy of Painting and Sculpture, 1648-1793] (in French). Vol. I. Paris: J. Baur.
- Dussieux, Louis Etienne; Soulié, Eudore; Mantz, Paul; Montaiglon, Anatole de (1854). Mémoires inédits sur la vie et les ouvrages des membres de l'Académie royale de peinture et de sculpture : publiés d'après les manuscrits conservés à l'Ecole impériale des beaux-arts [Unpublished memoirs on the life and works of members of the Royal Academy of Painting and Sculpture: published from the manuscripts kept at the Imperial School of Fine Arts] (in French). Vol. I. Paris: J.-B. Dumoulin. (Vol. 1 and 2 at Internet Archive, Vol. 1 and 2 at Gallica.)
- Janson, H.W. (1995). History of Art, 5th edition, revised and expanded by Anthony F. Janson. London: Thames & Hudson. ISBN 0500237018.
- Klingsöhr, Cathrin (1986). "Die Kunstsammlung der "Academie Royale de Peinture et de Sculpture" in Paris". Zeitschrift für Kunstgeschichte,vol. 49, no. 4, pp. 556–578. doi:10.2307/1482376.
- Landois, Paul (2003). "Academy of Painting". The Encyclopedia of Diderot & d'Alembert Collaborative Translation Project. Translated by Reed Benhamou. Ann Arbor: Michigan Publishing, University of Michigan Library. Originally published in 1751 as "Académie de Peinture," Encyclopédie ou Dictionnaire raisonné des sciences, des arts et des métiers, vol. 1, pp. 56–57. Paris.
- Michel, Christian (2018). The Académie Royale de Peinture et de Sculpture: The Birth of the French School, 1648–1793, translated from French by Chris Miller. Los Angeles: Getty Research Institute. ISBN 9781606065358.
- Testelin, Henri (1853). Mémoires pour servir à l'histoire de l'Académie royale de peinture et de sculpture, depuis 1648 jusqu'en 1664 [Memories to serve in the history of the Royal Academy of Painting and Sculpture from 1648 until 1664] (in French). Vol. I. Paris: P. Jannet.
- Testelin, Henri (1853). Mémoires pour servir à l'histoire de l'Académie royale de peinture et de sculpture, depuis 1648 jusqu'en 1664 [Memoirs to serve in the history of the Royal Academy of Painting and Sculpture, from 1648 until 1664] (in French). Vol. II. Paris: P. Jannet.
