= Georges Guillet de Saint-George =

Georges Guillet (1624 - 6 April 1705) was a French scholar, writer and actor, also known by his stage name Guillet de Saint-George, which he first took in 1661.

He was born in Thiers and was the first person to write a history of the Académie royale de peinture et de sculpture. He also wrote accounts of travels to the Levant under the pen-name "Sieur de La Guilletière". He died in Paris.

== Works ==
- Lacédémone ancienne et nouvelle, 1676, republished 1979.
- Arts de l'homme d'épée ou le dictionnaire du gentilhomme, 1678. Three volumes. In 1705, the 16th French edition was translated into English and refashioned for an English audience; it was published as The Gentleman's Dictionary.
- Histoire du règne de Mahomet II, 1681.

== Sources ==
- https://data.bnf.fr/11906420/georges_guillet_de_saint-george/
