= Pascal Payen-Appenzeller =

French radio program boss

Pascal Payen-Appenzeller (born 13 May 1944) is Franco-Swiss historian, poet and writer. His father was French and his mother was the Swiss daughter of the Swiss-German pastor and printer Friedrich Appenzeller.

== Sources ==
- Listing; Bibliothèque nationale de France
