= Anatole de Montaiglon =

French librarian and art historian (1824–1895)

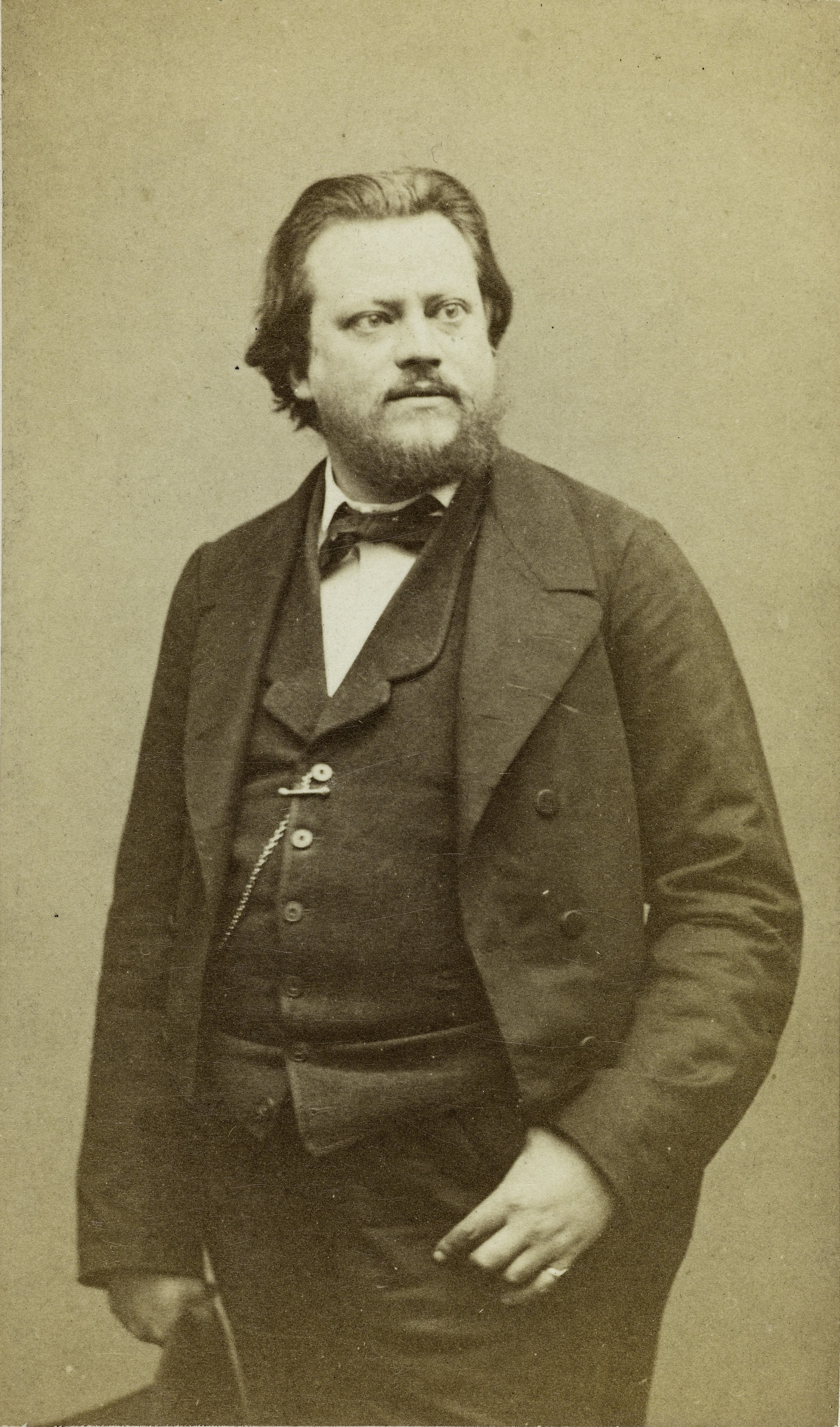
- Montaiglon sometime between 1860 and 1890
- Born: Anatole de Courde de Montaiglon; 28 November 1824; Paris, Kingdom of France
- Died: 1 October 1895 (aged 70); Tours, French Republic
- Occupations: Librarian; Art historian

Anatole de Courde de Montaiglon (28 November 1824 – 1 September 1895) was a 19th-century French librarian and art historian.

== Biography ==
In 1850, De Montaignon graduated as an archivist and palaeographer from the École des chartes, with a thesis entitled Essai de dictionnaire des anciens peintres français pendant le Moyen Âge et la Renaissance. He began his career as attached to the Louvre and the Bibliothèque de l'Arsenal and in 1864 became secretary of the École des Chartes, with a position of substitute teacher. In 1868, at the death of Auguste Vallet de Viriville the post of professor in full at the chair of bibliography and classification of archives and libraries.

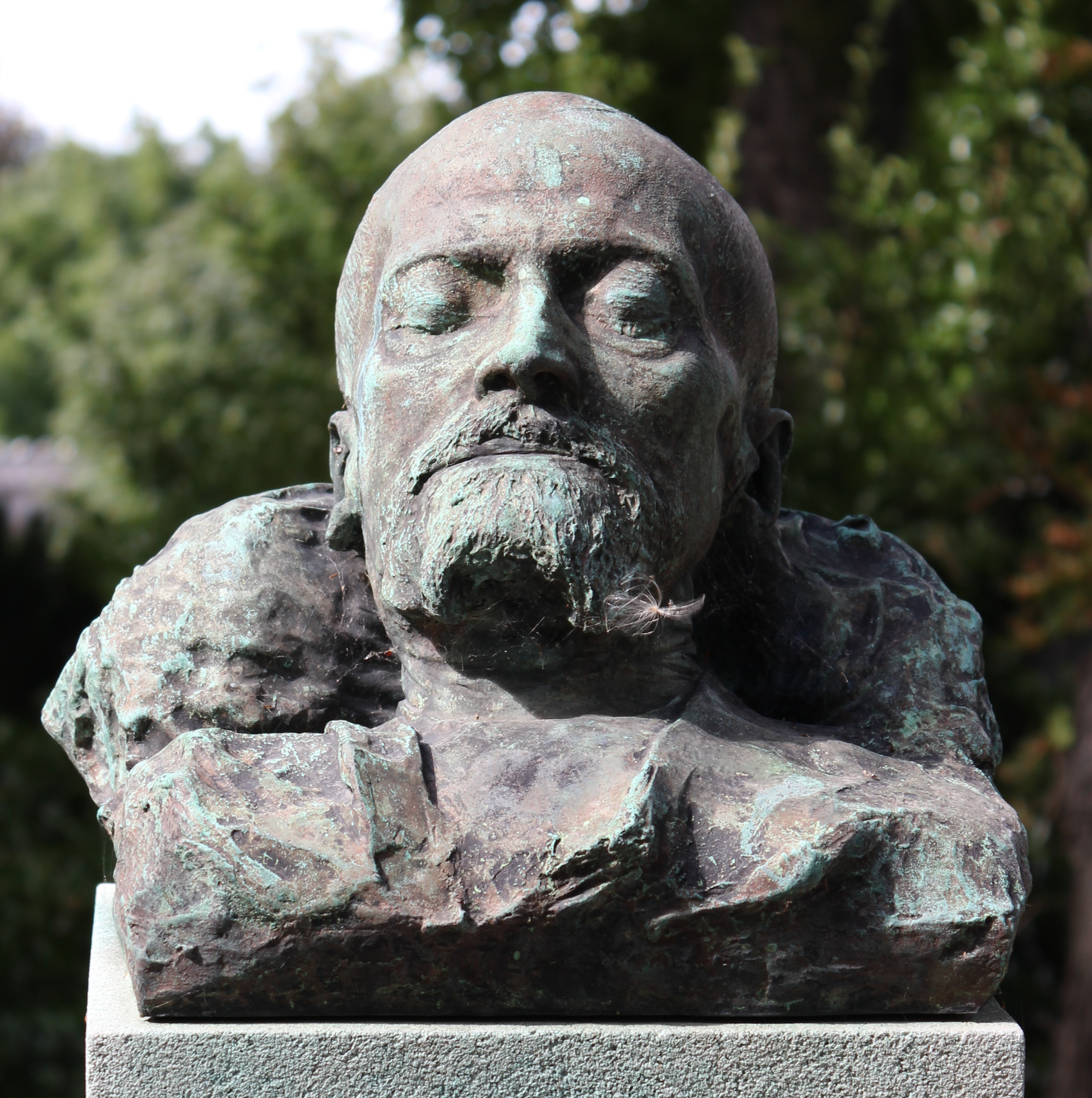
Bust of Montaiglon on his grave at Père Lachaise Cemetery.

His work is very diverse even as regretted Paul Meyer in his funeral oration, somewhat scattered: the printed bibliography of his work that was offered by friends report to nearly 700 numbers. His work generally related to the art history and particularly the history of literature. He was particularly a specialist in the poetry of the fifteenth, to which he devoted many studies and of which he gave important scientific or popular editions (Dolopathos, the Livre du chevalier de La Tour-Landry, the very large Recueil de poésies françoises des XVe XVIe (the nine first volumes alone, the next four with James Mayer de Rothschild), etc.)

Very involved in scholarly and intellectual life of the second half of the nineteenth, he was a member of the Comité des travaux historiques, president of the "Société de l'histoire de l'art français", and a member of the Société des Antiquaires de France.

Following his death in 1895, Montaiglon's friends erected a memorial at his grave at Père Lachaise Cemetery, which features a funerary mask by sculptor François-Léon Sicard.

== Publications ==
- Recueil de poésies françaises des XVe et XVIe siècles. Morales, facétieuses, historiques, tome 1, chez P. Jannet libraire, Paris, 1855 (lire en ligne)
- Recueil de poésies françaises des XVe et XVIe siècles. Morales, facétieuses, historiques, tome 2, chez P. Jannet libraire, Paris, 1855 (lire en ligne)
- Recueil de poésies françaises des XVe et XVIe siècles. Morales, facétieuses, historiques, tome 3, chez P. Jannet libraire, Paris, 1856 (read online)
- Recueil de poésies françaises des XVe et XVIe siècles. Morales, facétieuses, historiques, tome 4, chez P. Jannet libraire, Paris, 1856 (read online)
- Recueil de poésies françaises des XVe et XVIe siècles. Morales, facétieuses, historiques, tome 5, chez P. Jannet libraire, Paris, 1856 (read online)
- Recueil de poésies françaises des XVe et XVIe siècles. Morales, facétieuses, historiques, tome 6, chez P. Jannet libraire, Paris, 1857 (read online)
- Recueil de poésies françaises des XVe et XVIe siècles. Morales, facétieuses, historiques, tome 7, chez P. Jannet libraire, Paris, 1857 (read online)
- Recueil de poésies françaises des XVe et XVIe siècles. Morales, facétieuses, historiques, tome 8, chez P. Jannet libraire, Paris, 1858 (read online)
- Recueil de poésies françaises des XVe et XVIe siècles. Morales, facétieuses, historiques, tome 9, Librairie A. France, Paris, 1865 (read online)
- Recueil de poésies françaises des XVe et XVIe siècles. Morales, facétieuses, historiques, tome 10, Paul Daffis éditeur-propriétaire, Paris, 1875 (read online)
- Recueil de poésies françaises des XVe et XVIe siècles. Morales, facétieuses, historiques, tome 11, Paul Daffis éditeur-propriétaire, Paris, 1876 (read online)
- Recueil de poésies françaises des XVe et XVIe siècles. Morales, facétieuses, historiques, tome 12, Paul Daffis éditeur-propriétaire, Paris, 1877 (read online)
- Recueil de poésies françaises des XVe et XVIe siècles. Morales, facétieuses, historiques, tome 13, Paul Daffis éditeur-propriétaire, Paris, 1878 (read online)
- Sonnets tourangeaux, Imprimerie Ernest Mazereau, Tours, 1885 ("read online" BU Clermont Auvergne)
- Les sonnets de la chaise, Imprimerie Ernest Mazereau, Tours, 1885 ("read online" BU Clermont Auvergne)

== Bibliography ==
- Jules Guiffrey, Anatole de Courde de Montaiglon, 1824-1895, Notice biographique, Paris, 1897 (lire en ligne)
