= Dictionnaire historique des rues de Paris =

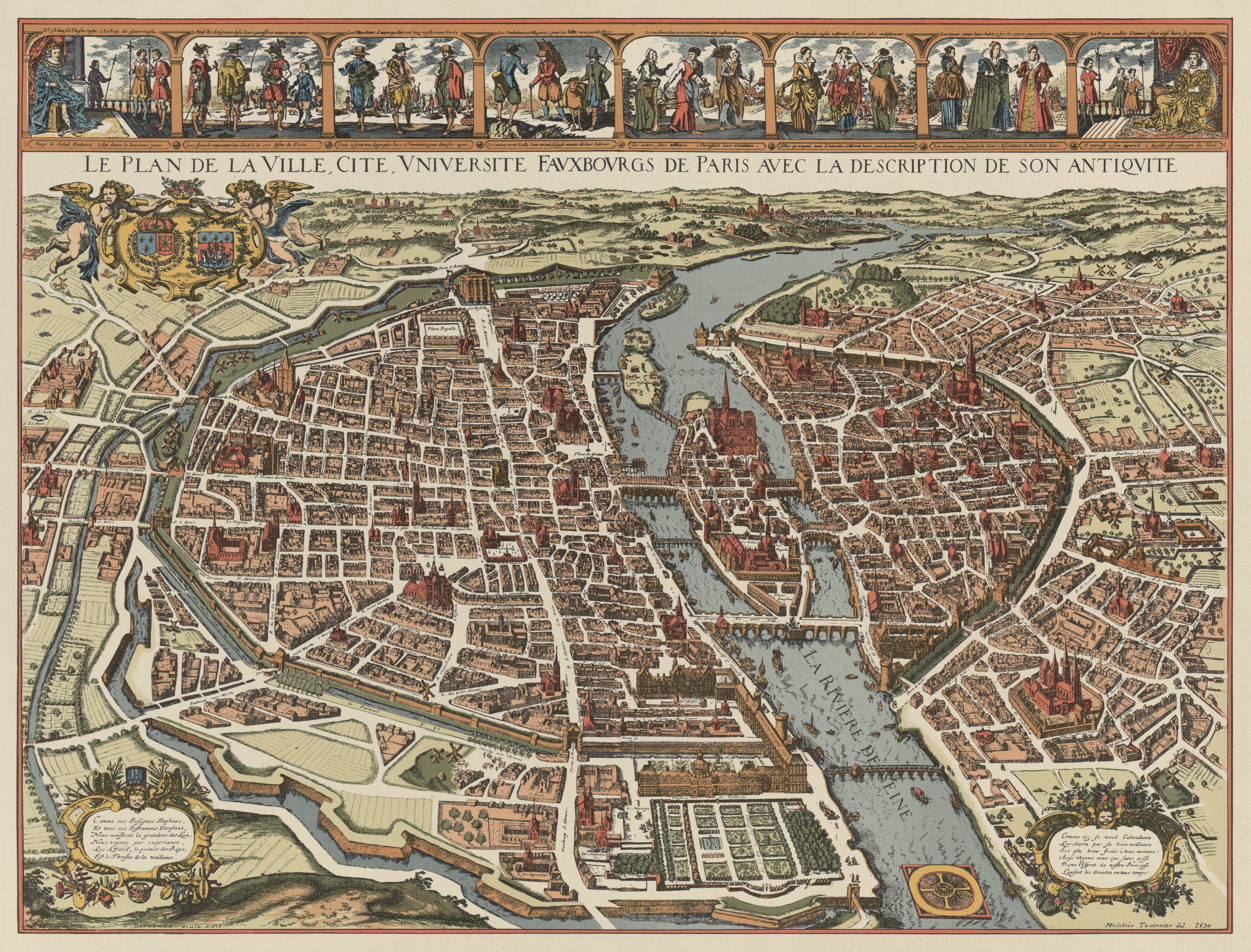
Merian map of Paris (1615)

Dictionnaire historique des rues de Paris (Historical Dictionary of the Streets of Paris) is a book by Jacques Hillairet, a historian specializing in the history of Paris. It includes 5344 streets in two volumes and 2343 illustrations. It was first published in 1960 by éditions de Minuit and was regularly re-published and updated from 1963 onwards. His sources included Dictionnaire administratif et historique des rues de Paris et de ses monuments by Louis and Félix Lazare (first edition, 1844) and Histoire de Paris rue par rue, maison par maison by Charles Lefeuve (issued from 1863).

Hillairet died in 1984 and the work is now written and edited by Pascal Payen-Appenzeller, who wrote the eleventh edition in 2004. The dictionary has received the Grand Prix Histoire from the Académie française.
