= Dictionnaire administratif et historique des rues de Paris et de ses monuments =

Dictionary of streets and monuments in Paris before Haussmann's renovation

The Dictionnaire administratif et historique des rues de Paris et de ses monuments [Administrative and Historical Dictionary of the Streets and Monuments of Paris] is a dictionary of the public streets, monuments and buildings of Paris.

== History ==
The book was first published in 1844 and written by Louis Clément Lazare (1811–1880) and one of his brothers, Félix Edmé Bernard Lazare (1815–1894), employees of the prefecture of the Seine at the time of prefect Rambuteau, to whom they dedicated the work. It is a valuable source on Paris before Haussmann's redesign of the city. It aimed to provide a reference work on official acts promulgated by different regimes, which defined the legal status and characteristics of public streets in the city - official streets, streets without government authorisation, their width, course and other data. A third edition was published in 1879.

== Bibliography ==
=== References ===
- Lazare, Félix (1815–1894) [at Wikidata]; Lazare, Louis (1811–1880) [in French] (1844). Dictionnaire administratif et historique des rues et monuments de Paris [Administrative and historical dictionary of the streets and monuments of Paris] (in French) (1st ed.). Paris: Se trouve Félix Lazure, boulevart Saint-Martin, 17. Retrieved October 29, 2024. LCCN 15-10577; BnF 32357628x; SUDOC 017935881; OCLC 2943749 (all editions).
1. Via Wikisource (BnF; Gallica).
2. Via BnF (Gallica).
3. Via Google Books (BML).
4. Via Google Books (Harvard).
- Lazare, Félix (1815–1894) [at Wikidata]; Lazare, Louis (1811–1880) [in French] (1855) [1844]. Dictionnaire administratif et historique des rues et monuments de Paris [Administrative and historical dictionary of the streets and monuments of Paris] (in French) (2nd ed.). Paris: Bureau de la Revue Municipale. Retrieved October 29, 2024. LCCN 96-114312 (re-print of 1855 ed.); OCLC 8547189 (all editions).
1. Via HathiTrust (NYPL). Au Bureau de la revue municipale. 1855.
2. Via Google Books (Michigan).
3. Via Google Books (BSB).
- Lazare, Félix (1815–1894) [at Wikidata]; Lazare, Louis (1811–1880) [in French] (1876) [1855, 1844]. Dictionnaire administratif et historique des rues et monuments de Paris [Administrative and historical dictionary of the streets and monuments of Paris] (in French) (3rd ed.). Paris: Au bureau du courrier municipal, boulevard du Temple, 10. Retrieved October 29, 2024.
1. Via BnF (Gallica). 1879.
- 1994 & 2003 Re-Prints → Lazare, Félix (1815–1894) [at Wikidata]; Lazare, Louis (1811–1880) [in French] (1855). Dictionnaire administratif et historique des rues et monuments de Paris [Administrative and historical dictionary of the streets and monuments of Paris] (in French). Introduction by Michel Fleury (1923–2002) (2nd ed.). Paris: 1855: Bureau de la Revue Municipale. 1994: Maisonneuve et Larose; Réédition en fac-similé [Facsimile reprint]. Retrieved October 29, 2024. LCCN 96-114312 (1994 re-print of 1855 ed.); ISBN 2-7068-1098-X, 978-2-7068-1098-5; OCLC 416331492 (all editions).
1. Lazare, Félix; Lazare, Louis (1994). Internet Archive (Trent). Maisonneuve et Larose. ISBN 978-2-7068-1098-5.
