= Jacques Hillairet =

French historian (1886–1984)

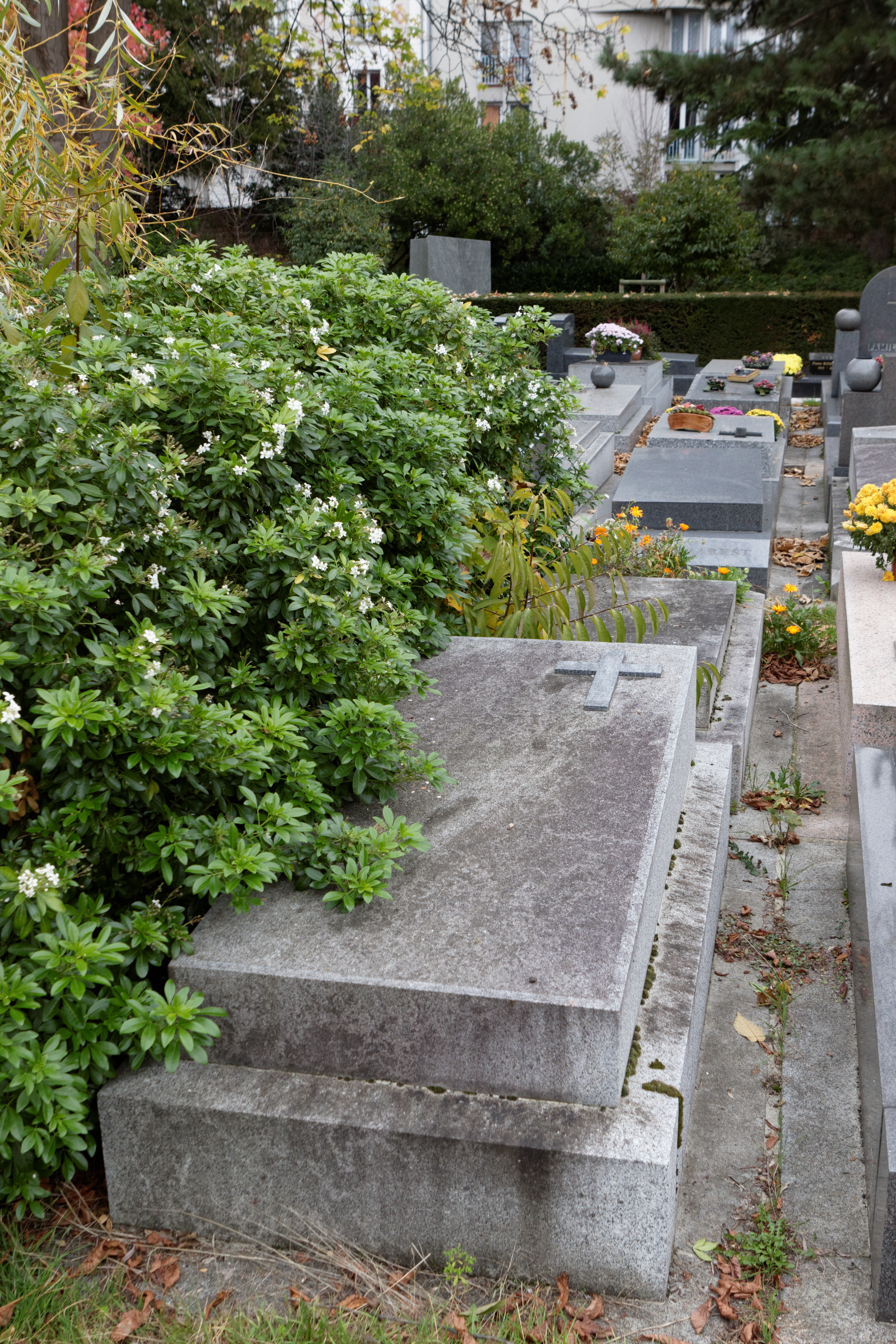
- Hillairet’s grave at Père Lachaise Cemetery
- Born: Auguste André Coussillan; 31 July 1886; Commentry
- Died: 15 April 1984 (aged 97); Paris
- Occupation: French historian
- Years active: 1951-1984
- Known for: studies of the history of Paris

Auguste André Coussillan (31 July 1886 – 15 April 1984) was a French historian specialising in the history of Paris. Under the pen-name Jacques Hillairet (French: [ʒak ijɛʁɛ]) he wrote two major reference works on the subject in the 1950s - Connaissance du vieux Paris and Dictionnaire historique des rues de Paris.

== Biography ==
Hillairet's father was a postmaster and was appointed to Paris when he was 7 years old. Hillairet also began his career in the public sector and was employed at the telephone exchange on the rue de Grenelle in 1910. At the outbreak of World War I, he was drafted and assigned to work in communications. He was first stationed at the seafront telegraph service in Cherbourg. From August 10, 1914, he was moved to the Army of Alsace, where he installed telephone services in the trenches. He remained in the army after the war.

Between 1924 and 1926, he was a professor at the Saumur cavalry school. He was then assigned to the Ministry of War and later, between 1930 and 1938, to Lebanon (then under French mandate) on behalf of the Ministry of Telephones. He was mobilised at the start of World War II as a colonel. Taken prisoner, he was sent to Silesia during the winter of 1940. He was released in 1941 and retired from the army. He then lived in Marseille.

After the Liberation, he settled in Paris, where he became passionate about the less well known aspects of Parisian history. He organised conference tours on old Paris and changed his name to carry out this activity so that, in his words, "his little comrades in the army would not mess with him”. He took his mother's birth name and called himself Jacques Hillairet.

From 1951, Hillairet published a series of three books with Editions de Minuit. These were followed in 1956 by the three volumes of the Connaissance du Vieux Paris series. He also directed the Évocation du Grand Paris series, which includes three works by the historian Georges Poisson. The Historical Dictionary of the Streets of Paris, regularly republished and updated, describes in detail the history, monuments and events that have marked some 5,334 streets of the French capital.

Hillairet died in 1984 in the 12th arrondissement of Paris and was buried in the Père-Lachaise cemetery, in the 88th division.

== Honors ==
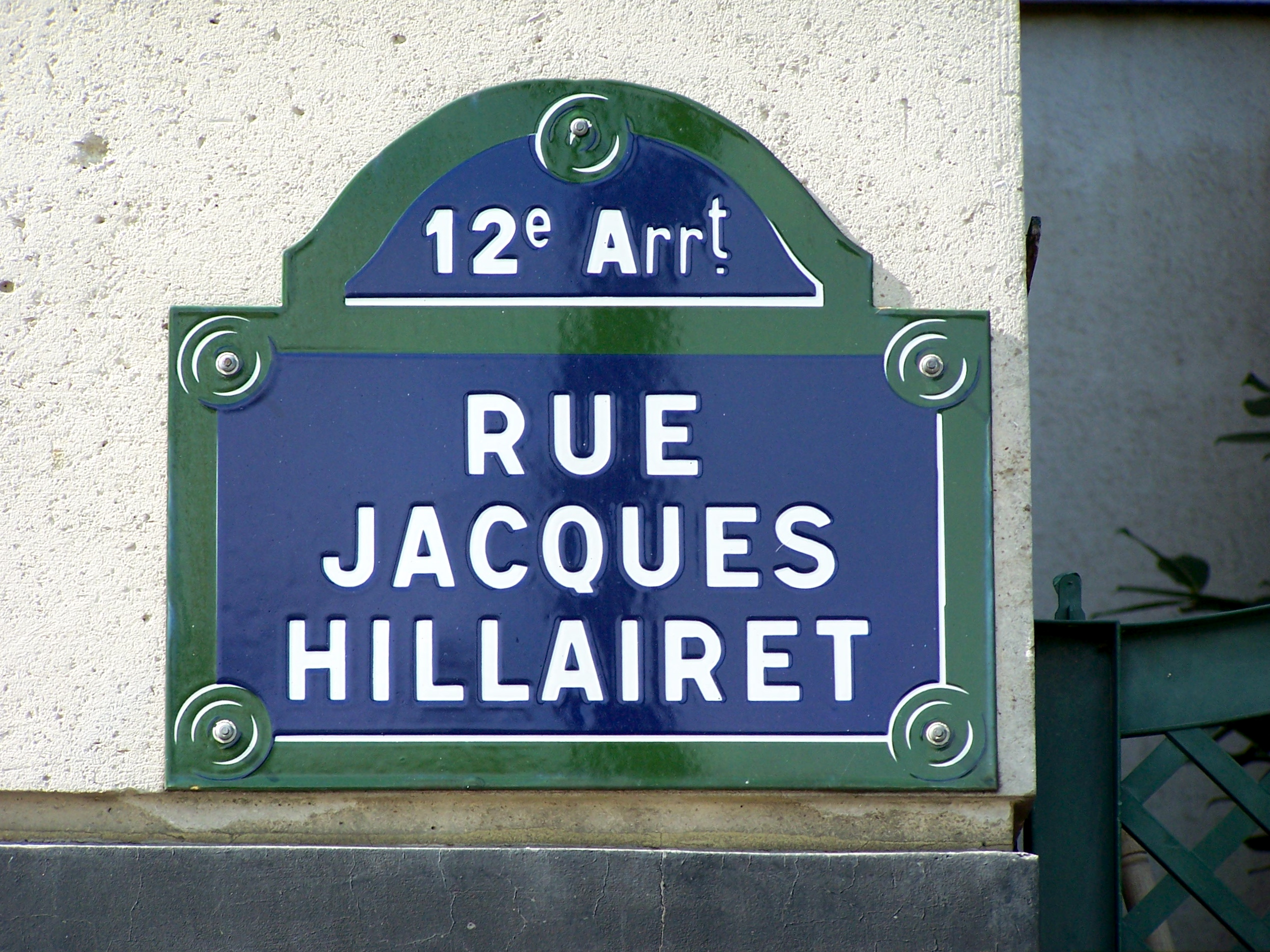
Road sign for rue Jacques-Hillairet in the 12th arrondissement of Paris

He received several military and civil honours. Officer of the Legion of Honour, la Croix de Guerre 1914-1918 and the Combatant's Cross. He was also three times laureate of the French Academy, including the Grand Prix Gobert. In 1957, he received the literary grand prize from the General Council of the Seine and, in 1978, the vermeil medal from the City of Paris.

In 1990, a rue Jacques-Hillairet was created in the 12th arrondissement of Paris, close to where he lived.

== Works ==
- Évocation du vieux Paris. Vieux Quartiers, vieilles rues, vieilles demeures, historique, vestiges, annales et anecdotes, 3 vol., Minuit, 1951-1954 1. Le Paris du Moyen Âge et de la Renaissance; Vol. 2. Les Faubourgs. Vol. 3. Les Villages de Paris.
- Saint-Germain l'Auxerrois, église collégiale royale et paroissiale, l'église, la paroisse, le quartier, avec Maurice Baurit, Minuit, 1955
- Le Palais du Louvre, sa vie, ses grands souvenirs historiques, Minuit, 1955; 1961
- Connaissance du vieux Paris, Le Club français du livre, 1956; 3 vol., Gonthier, 1963; Le Club français du livre, 1965 à 1976; Éditions Princesse, 1978; Payot/Rivages, 1993; Rivages/Poche, 2005. Vol. 1. Rive droite. Vol. 2. Rive gauche. Vol. 3. Les Îles es les Villages.
- Gibets, piloris et cachots du vieux Paris, Minuit, 1956; 1989
- Les 200 Cimetières du vieux Paris, Minuit, 1958
- Dictionnaire historique des rues de Paris, 2 vol., Minuit, 1963; 1985; 2004
- Le Palais royal et impérial des Tuileries et son jardin, Minuit, 1965
- Charonne, notre quartier, avec Lucien Lambeau, Étiolles, 1965
- La Rue de Richelieu, Minuit, 1966
- Les Musées d'art de Paris, avec Raymond Cogniat, Aimery Somogy, 1967
- L'Île Saint-Louis, rue par rue, maison par maison, Minuit, 1967
- L'Île de la Cité, Minuit, 1969
- La Rue Saint-Antoine, Minuit, 1970; 1988
- Le Douzième Arrondissement, Minuit, 1972
- Les Mazarinettes, ou les Sept Nièces de Mazarin, Minuit, 1976
- La Colline de Chaillot, Minuit, 1977
- Le Village d'Auteuil, Minuit, 1978

== Bibliography ==
- Some parts of this article are translated from the French Wikipedia article, fr:Jacques Hillairet.
