= Jacques-Nicolas Tardieu =

French engraver (1716–1791)

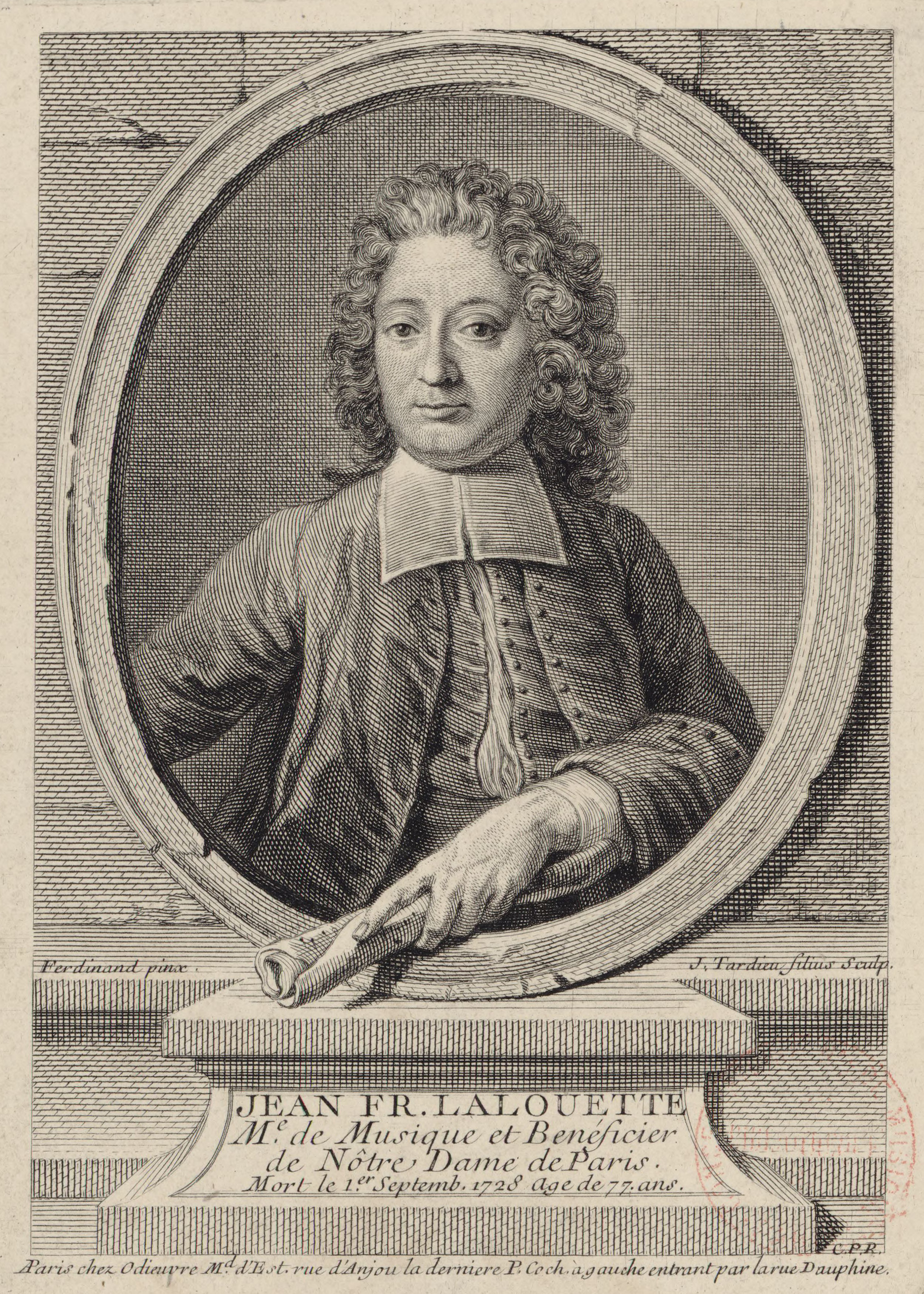
- Jean-François Lalouette
- Born: 2 September 1716; Paris, France
- Died: 9 July 1791 (aged 74); Paris, France
- Known for: Engraver

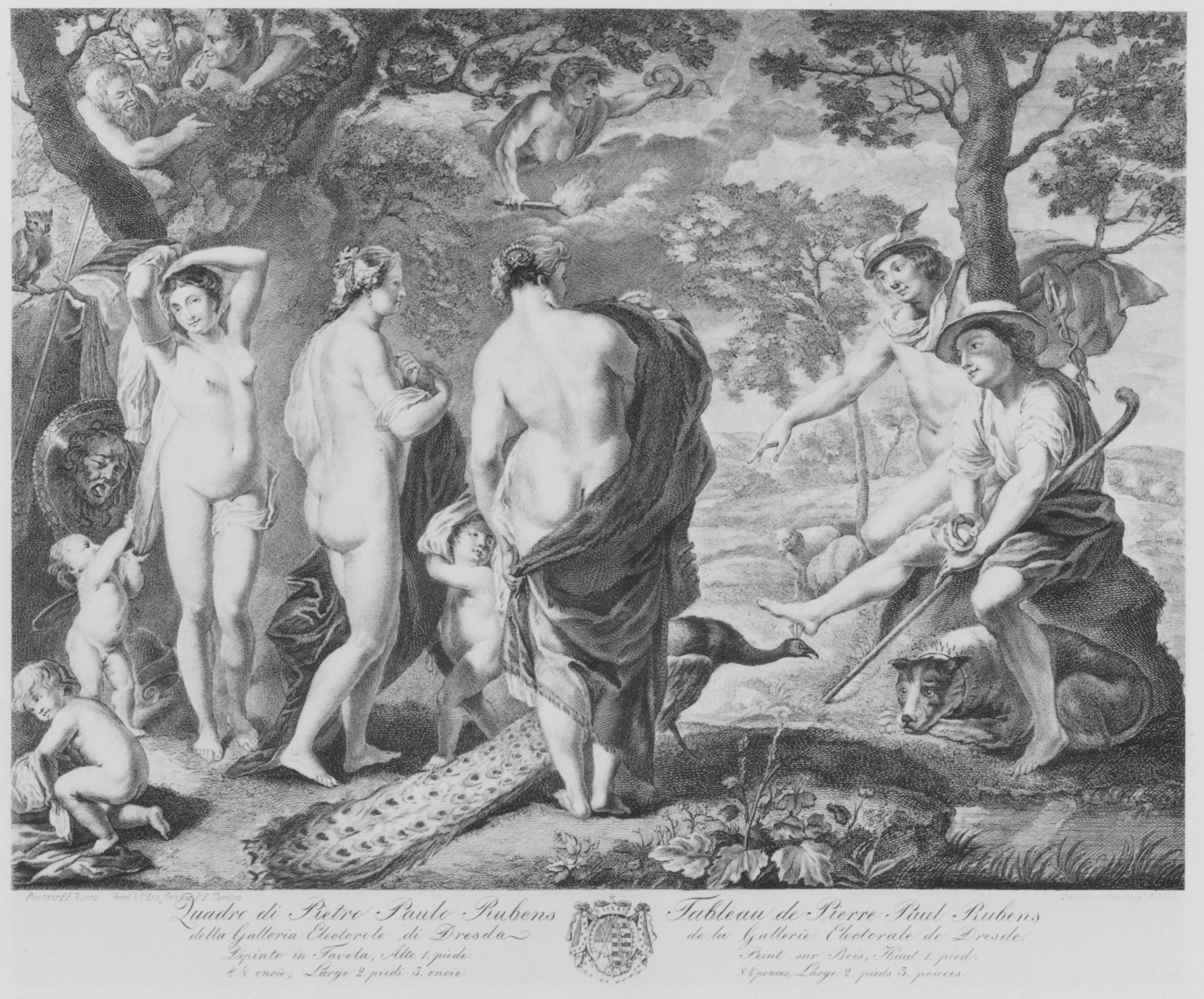
Judgment of Paris – Jacques Nicolas Tardieu and Pierre Etienne Moitte after Peter Paul Rubens

Jacques-Nicolas Tardieu, called "Tardieu fils" or "Tardieu the younger", (2 September 1716 – 9 July 1791) was a French engraver.

== Biography ==
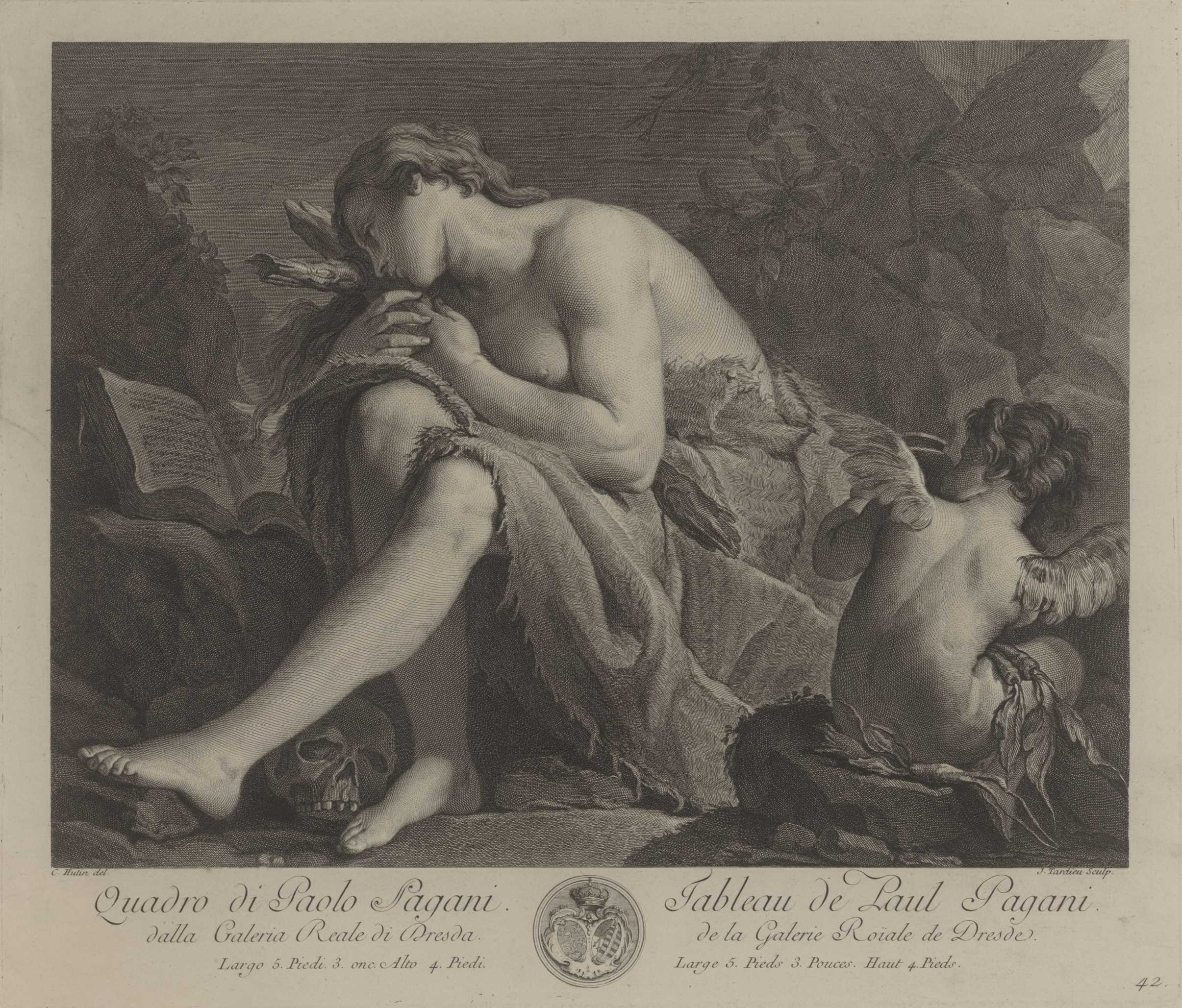
La Magdeleine pénitente, gravure de Tardieu d’après Paolo Pagani, v. 1750, Dresde, Galerie des vieux maitres de Dresde.

Jacques-Nicolas Tardieu was born on 2 September 1716 in Paris. He was the son of Marie-Anne Horthemels and Nicolas-Henri Tardieu, both engravers. He was taught by his father, who was recognized as one of the most eminent engravers France has produced. He was received at the Académie française on 24 October 1749 for his engraved portraits of Bon Boullogne (after Gilles Allou) and Le Lorrain (after Donat Nonnotte). He became graveur ordinaire du roi (Official Engraver to the King) and is also described as graveur ordinaire of the Elector of Cologne.

Tardieu married in turn two print makers, Jeanne-Louise-Françoise Duvivier and Élisabeth-Claire Tournay. Jeanne-Louise is on record as having made several engravings. Her father, Jean Duvivier, and her brother, Pierre-Simon-Benjamin Duvivier, were both medal engravers, members of the Academy and graveurs du roi (King's Engravers). Jeanne-Louise died on 6 April 1762. Tardieu's second wife, Élisabeth Claire (1731 – 3 May 1773) was also an engraver. Her works included The Concert after Jean François de Troy, La Marchande de moutarde (The Mustard Merchant) after Charles François Hutin, La Dame de Charité (The Charitable Lady), Le Prêtre du Catéchisme (The Catechist) and La Vieille Coquette (The Old Coquette) after Pierre Louis Dumesnil, and Le Joli Dormir (The Repose) after Étienne Jeaurat. The tendency for wives to become prominent artists beside their husbands was unusual at the time but was common in the Tardieu family.

Jacques-Nicolas Tardieu died in Paris on 9 July 1791. His son Jean-Charles Tardieu became a well-known painter.

== Œuvres ==
Tardieu made less use of the point graver than his father, and more use of the Burin, or cold chisel. As a result, his prints are more precise. It has been said, however, that they are "inferior in spirit and picturesqueness of effect." He made some of the plates for the Gallery of Versailles, after paintings by Charles Le Brun. His greatest ability may have been in portraits, such as those of his father and of Alexis Simon Belle, Pierre Jeannin and Mademoiselle du Bocage. His most notable portrait was that of the queen Marie Leszczyńska, after Jean-Marc Nattier.

Tardieu's portraits include:

- Louis XV, after Vanloo
- Queen Marie Leszczyńska, wife of Louis XV after Jean-Marc Nattier
- Marie Henriette of France after Jean-Marc Nattier
- The Archbishop of Bordeaux after Jean Restout the Younger
- Robert Lorraine, sculptor to the King and Bou Boullogne, Painter to the King 1749

Other well-known works are:

- Christ appearing to the Virgin after Guido
- Mary Magdalene penitant after Paolo Pagnani
- The pool of Bethesda after Jean Restout
- The Miseries of War after Teniers
- A pair of landscapes after Cochin the Younger.

Other works are:

- Le Paralytique guéri près de la piscine, after the painting by Jean Restout, Arras, Musée des beaux-arts, 1743
- La Sainte Famille, after Christophe
- Constantin qui se fait apporter l’étendard où était travaillé le signe qu’il avait vu dans le ciel
- L’Éloquence, allégorie, after de La Joue, 1745
- Une vignette des armes du roi, avec des anges pour supports, after the drawing by M. Boucher
- Portrait du président Jeannin, ministre d’État sous Henri IV
- Portrait du maréchal Dubourg, after M. de Leyn
- Portrait de M. Belle, peintre du roi, after the painting done by himself
- Portrait de M. Tardieu, le père, graveur du roi, after Charles-André van Loo
- Vignette représentant le portrait du roi, after a sketch by M. Duvivier, 1746
- Portail de l’église de Saint-Sulpice (pour la description de la dédicace de cette église)
- Portrait de feu Mgr le Dauphin duc de Bourgogne, after Rigaud
- Portrait de feu M. l’abbé de Rothelin, after Noël-Nicolas Coypel
- Portrait de l’archevêque électeur de Cologne, 1748
- Portrait of M. le duc de Sully, author of the Mémoires sur l’histoire d’Henri IV
- Portrait de M. de Boccage, after the painting by Marianne Loir
- Docteur alchimiste, after David Teniers the Younger
- Deux tableaux représentant différents costumes des peuples orientaux
- Deux tableaux représentant des animaux, after the drawings by Charles-Nicolas Cochin
- Portrait de feu M. de Boullongne, after Gilles Allou, 1750
- Portrait de M. Le Lorrain, after Claude-Adrien Nonnotte
- La Colère d’Achille
- Adieu d’Hector et d’Andromaque, sujets tirés de l’Iliade d’Homère), after the paintings by Coypel
- Les Misères de la guerre
- Le Déjeuner flamand (dont le tableau est connu en Flandre sons le nom de La Dévote de Teniers), after David Teniers the Younger.
- L’Apparition de Notre-Seigneur d la Sainte Vierge, estampe gravée, after le Guide (royal gallery of Dresden), 1753
- Portrait de la reine, after the painting by Jean-Marc Nattier, 1755
- La Magdeleine pénitente, after Paolo Pagani, (royal gallery of Dresden), 1757
- Portrait de feu Mme Henriette de France, after Nattier, 1759
- Portrait de M. Lullin, ministre de Genève
- Portrait de Mgr l’archevêque de Bordeaux, after Restout, 1765
- Portrait de M. le prince de Gallitzin, ministre plénipotentiaire en France de la Cour de Russie, after François-Hubert Drouais
- Portrait de M. d’Etemare, after Belle, 1775
- Portrait de Mlle de La Font
- Portrait de M. l’abbé Gourdin, 1777
- Portrait de Dimitri Alexeyevich Gallitzin, after Drouais, 1762

== Gallery ==
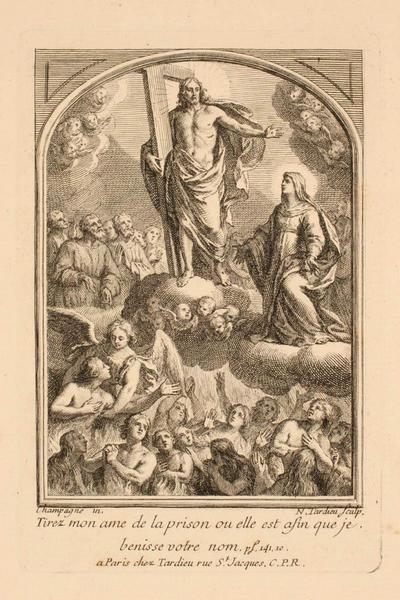
Glory of Christ

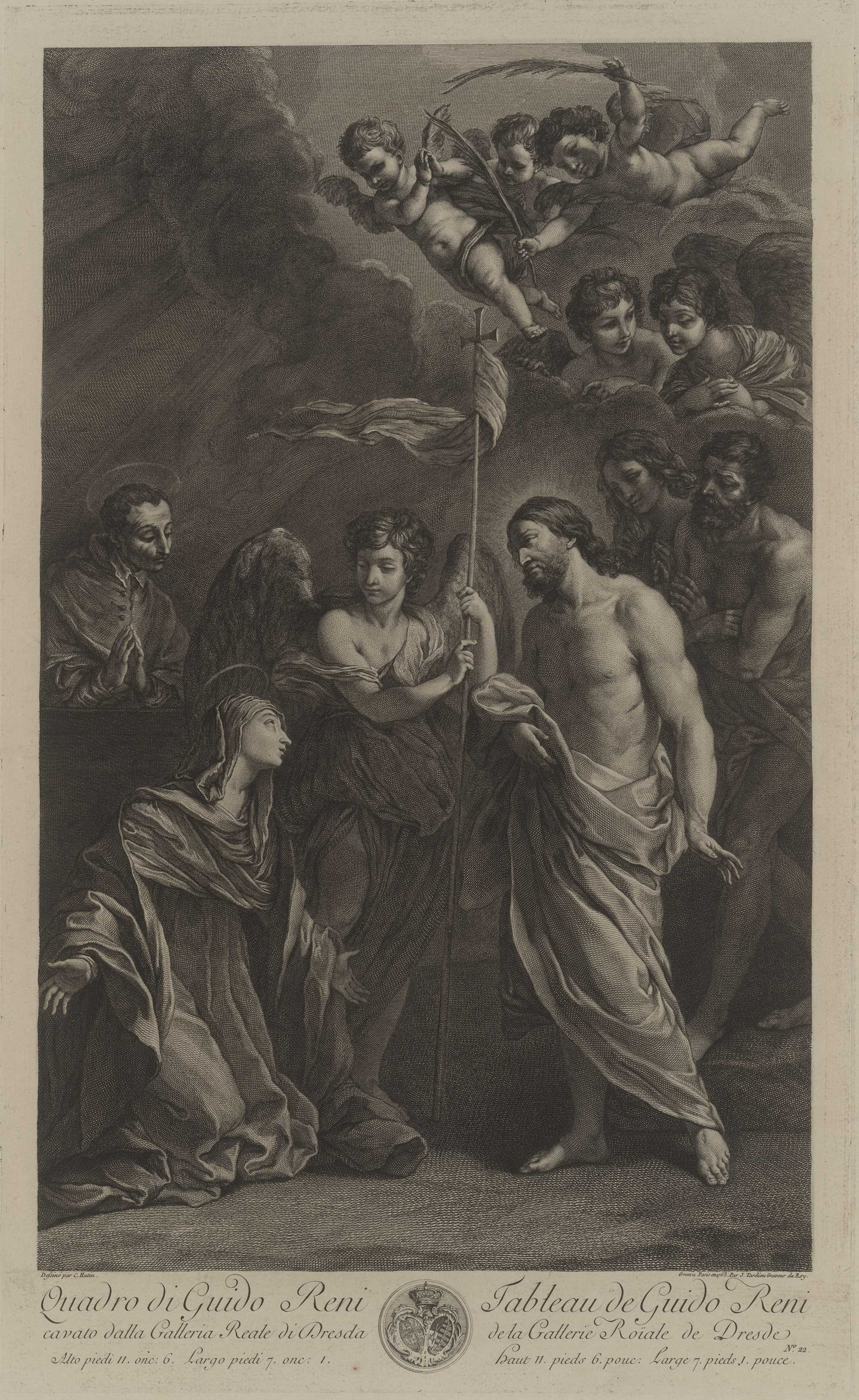
Christ in Limbo before his mother. c.1750. After Guido Reni

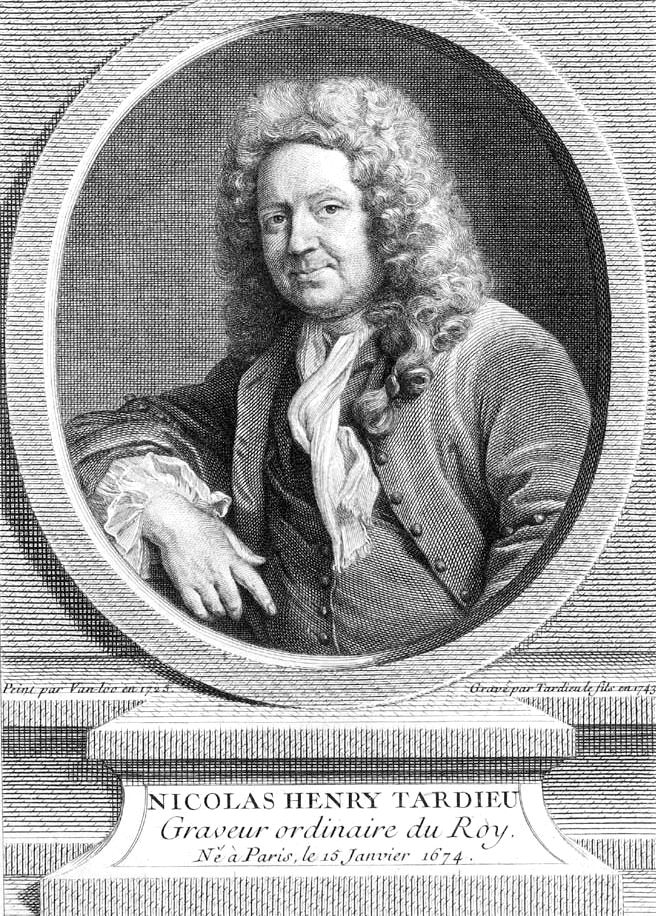
The artist's father, Nicolas-Henri Tardieu (1674–1749), after Charles-André van Loo
