= Élisabeth-Claire Tardieu =

French artist (1731–1773)

- Born: Élisabeth-Claire Tournay; 1731; Paris, Kingdom of France
- Died: 1773 (aged 41–42)
- Known for: Engraving
- Spouse: Jacques-Nicolas Tardieu

Élisabeth-Claire Tardieu (1731-1773) was a French engraver.

== Life and work ==
Tardieu was born in Paris in 1731. She worked as an engraver, creating reproduction engravings of Pierre Louis Dumesnil, François de Troy, Étienne Jeaurat and others. Her husband was Jacques-Nicolas Tardieu. She died in Paris in 1773.

== Notable collections ==
- L' Aimable Accord (Pleasant Harmony), Library of Congress
- Le déjeuner de l'enfant, ca. 1748–1760, British Museum
- Sweet Sleep, 1760-1770s, Hermitage Museum
