= Pierre-Simon-Benjamin Duvivier =

French engraver

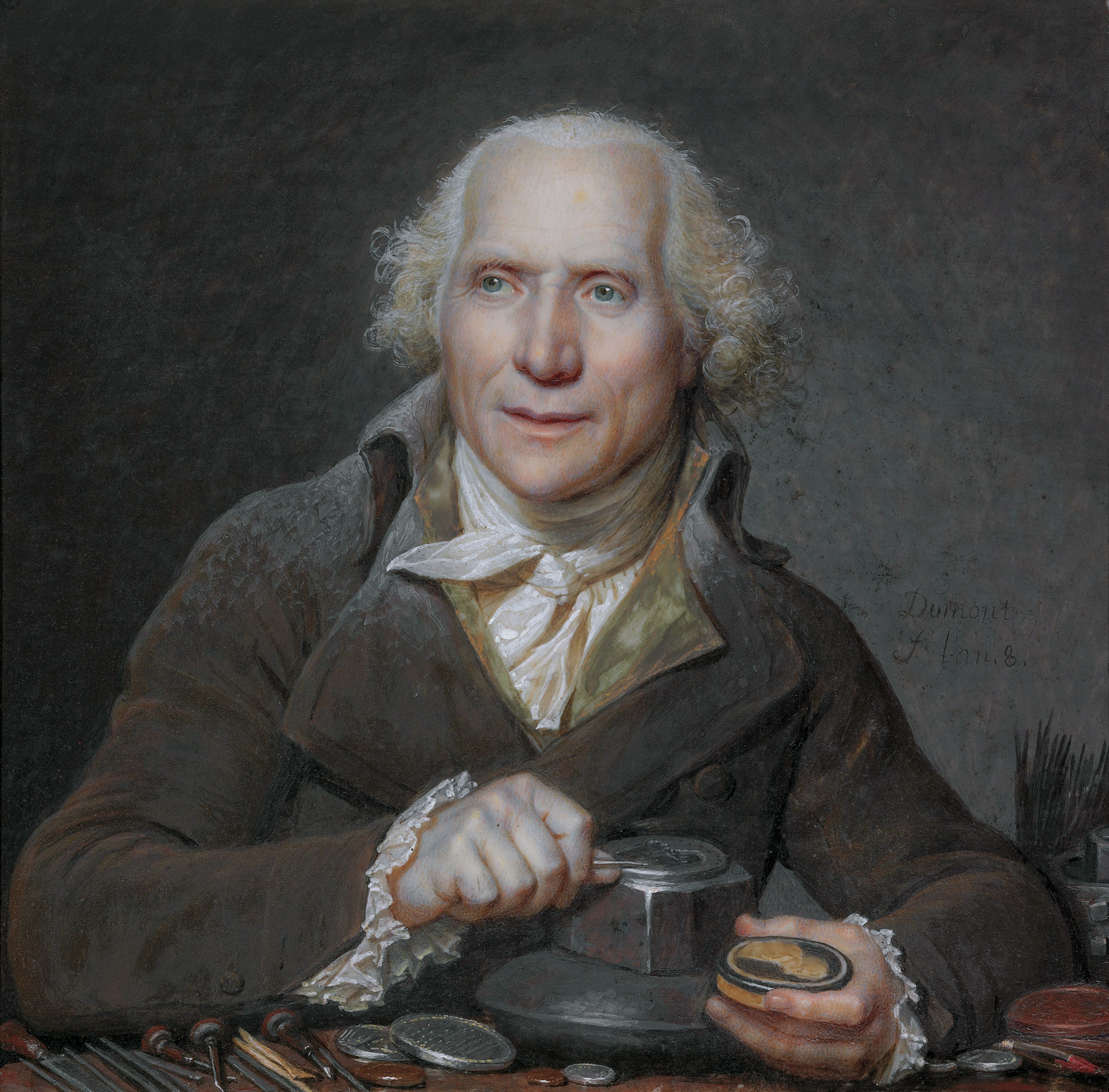
- Pierre Simon Benjamin Duvivier (1730-1819), by François Dumont
- Born: 3 November 1730; Paris, France
- Died: 10 July 1819 (aged 88); Paris, France
- Known for: Medallist

Pierre-Simon-Benjamin Duvivier (3 November 1730 – 10 July 1819) was a French engraver of coins and medals.

== Early years ==
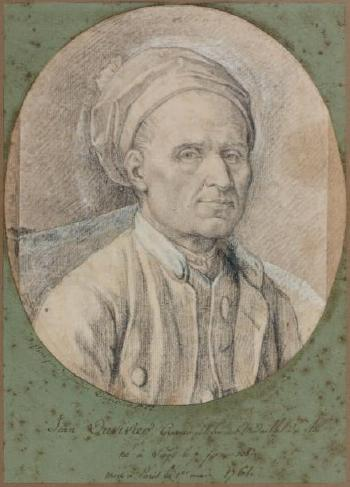
Portrait by Benjamin of his father, Jean Duvivier, dated the year after his father's death

Pierre-Simon-Benjamin Duvivier was born in Paris on 3 November 1730. He was son of the well-known medallist Jean Duvivier and of his wife, Louise Vignon. His family originated from Liège. His brother was Thomas-Germain-Joseph Duvivier, also a painter and engraver. His sister Jeanne-Louise-Françoise married the engraver Jacques-Nicolas Tardieu and is on record as having made several engravings herself.

Benjamin Duvivier was placed in the Collège Mazarin to study humanities and philosophy, where he met and befriended Abraham Hyacinthe Anquetil-Duperron and Nicolas Louis de Lacaille, the future astronomer. He planned to undertake a voyage of exploration with Anquetil-Duperron, but was forced to cancel it for reasons of health. When his father violently objected to his decision to follow a career in art, he left home and moved in with his sister and brother-in-law, the Academician Tardieu. His mother died in 1752. On 25 September 1756 he won a medal from the Academy for a nature scene.

== Career ==
Benjamin Duvivier's father died on 30 April 1761. Benjamin applied to the king to retain the position that his father had occupied in the Louvre Galleries, and on 7 June 1762 this was granted to him, and he thus assumed his father's job as medallist to the King. Benjamin Duvivier probably had more talent than his father. On 24 November 1764 he was accepted as a Member of the Royal Academy of Painting and Sculpture. On 13 February 1765 he obtained a brevet royal that authorized him to spend a year in Italy. On 21 August 1774 he obtained the position of general engraver of coins, replacing Joseph-Charles Roëttiers.

Duvivier drew portraits of several members of the royal family during the reigns of Louis XV and Louis XVI. Duvivier exhibited at the Salons of 1769, 1773, 1775, 1777, 1779, 1781, 1783, 1785, 1793 and 1798. At the Salon of 1773, visitors could compare Duvivier's medal in honor of Frederick III, Duke of Saxe-Gotha-Altenburg with a portrait bust of the King by his friend Jean-Antoine Houdon. In 1788 he was listed as a foreign associate of the Academy of Science and Arts that Alexandre-Marie Quesnay de Beaurepaire had founded in Richmond, Virginia. He made medals of George Washington and, in 1791, of Gilbert du Motier, Marquis de Lafayette.

Duvivier taught his brother-in-law Pierre-Joseph Tiolier (1763-1819), who was appointed General Engraver of the mint in 1803. During the French Revolution, on 11 July 1791 Duvivier's title and position were abolished and he was replaced by his former assistant Augustin Dupré. In 1806 Duvivier was appointed to the engraving section of the Beaux-Arts school at the Institut de France. He died in Paris on 10 July 1819. His son may have been the painter Français Duvivier, who opened an academy of drawing and painting in Philadelphia in 1796.

== Gallery ==
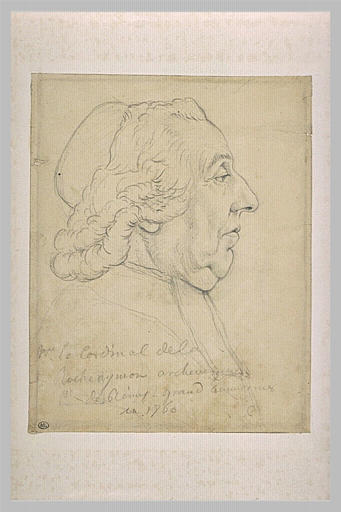
Cardinal Charles-Antoine de la Roche-Aymon (1760)

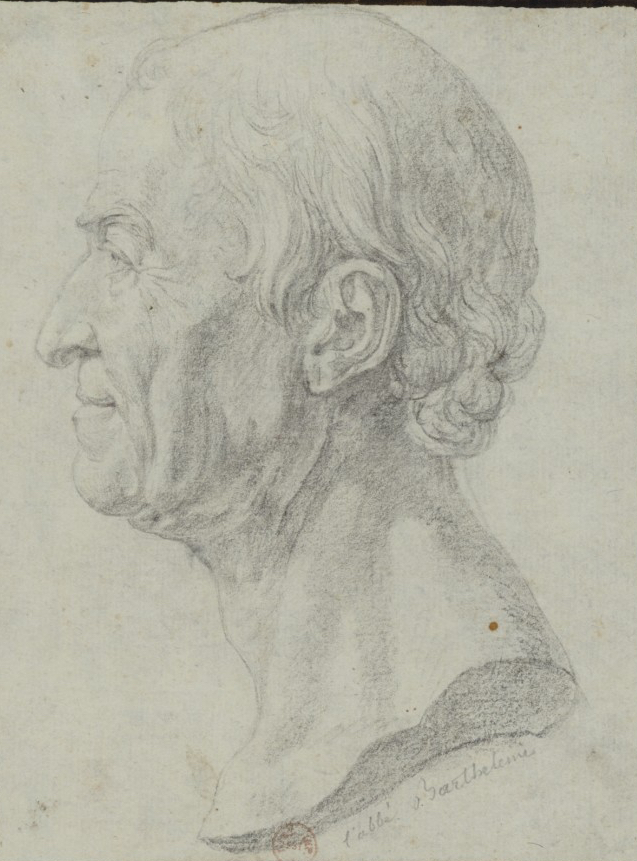
French archaeologist and numismatist Jean-Jacques Barthélemy (1716-1795)

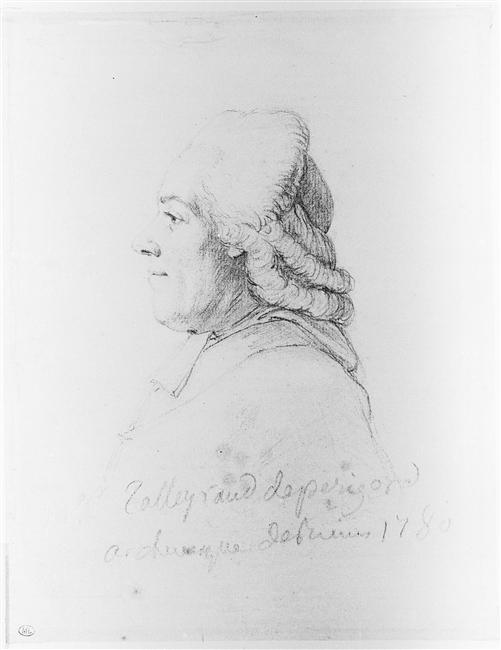
Portrait of Alexandre Angélique de Talleyrand-Périgord (1736-1821)
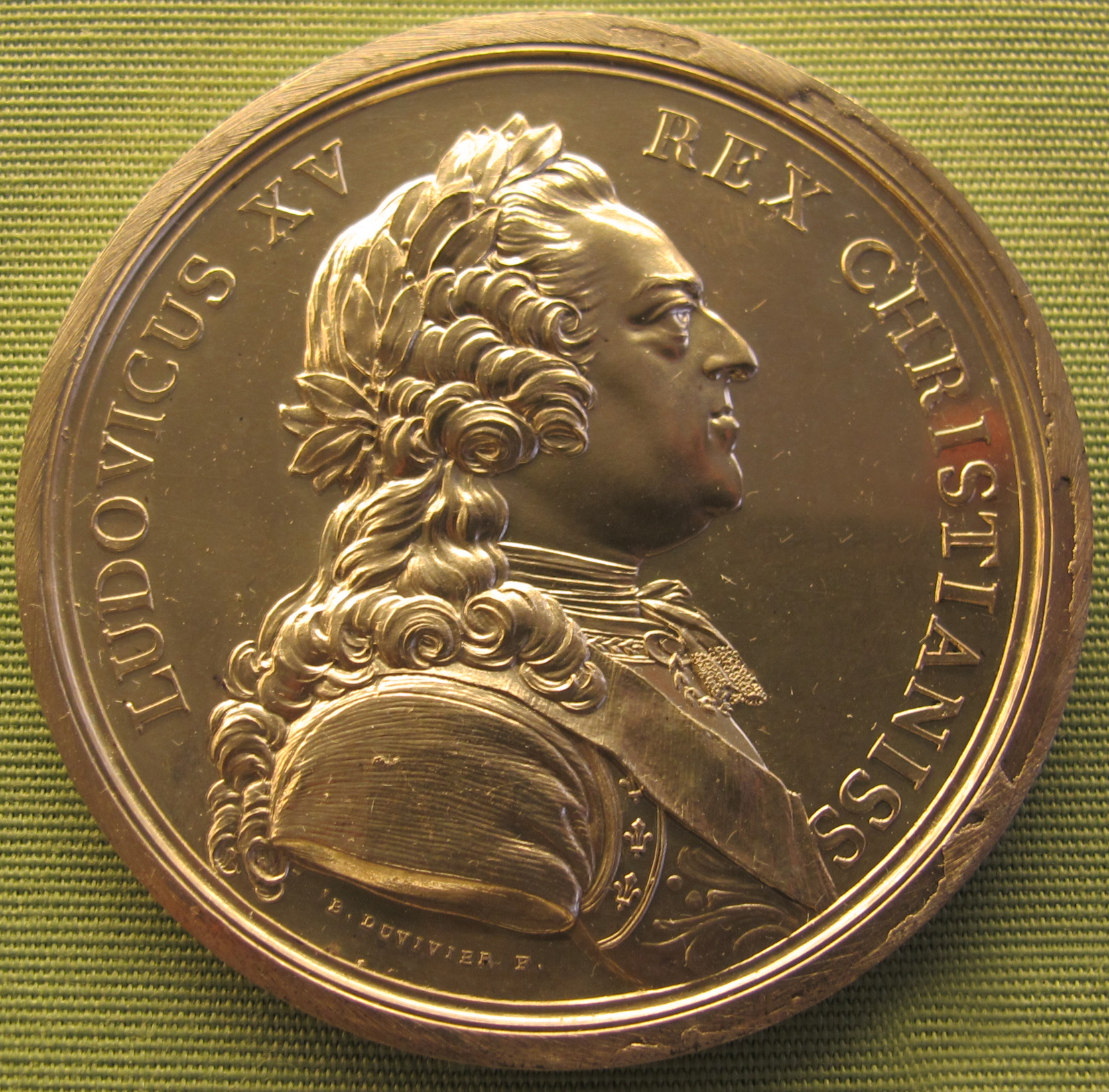
Louis XV, 1767

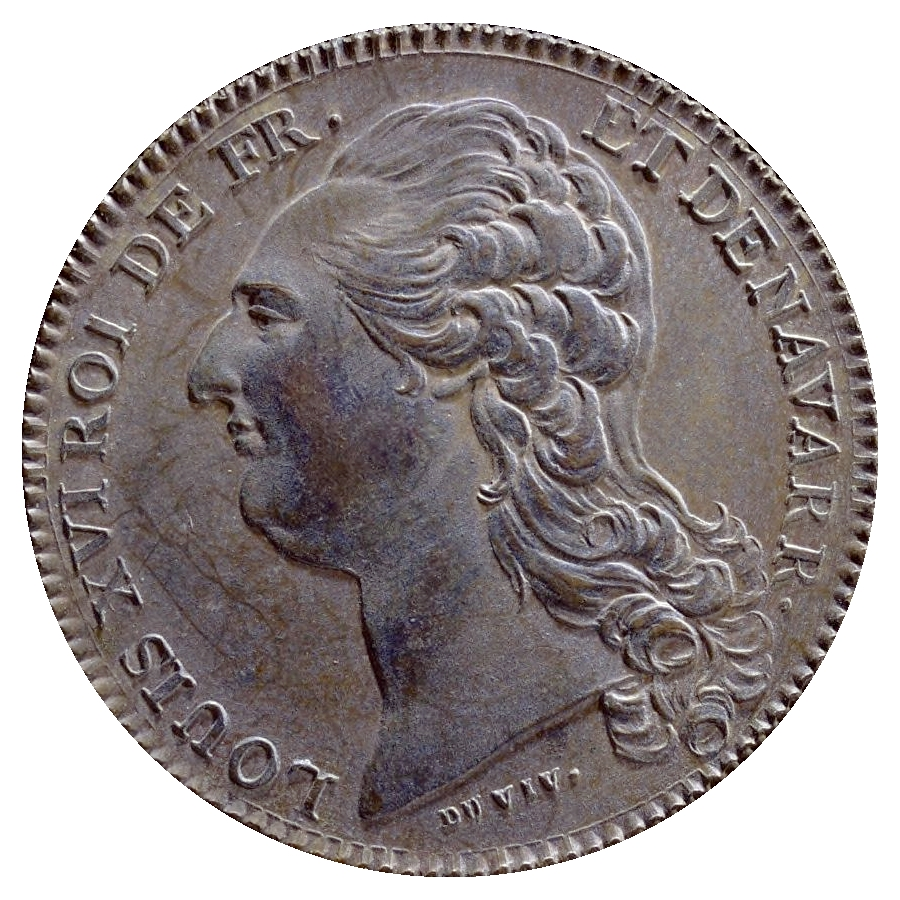
Medal of Louis XVI

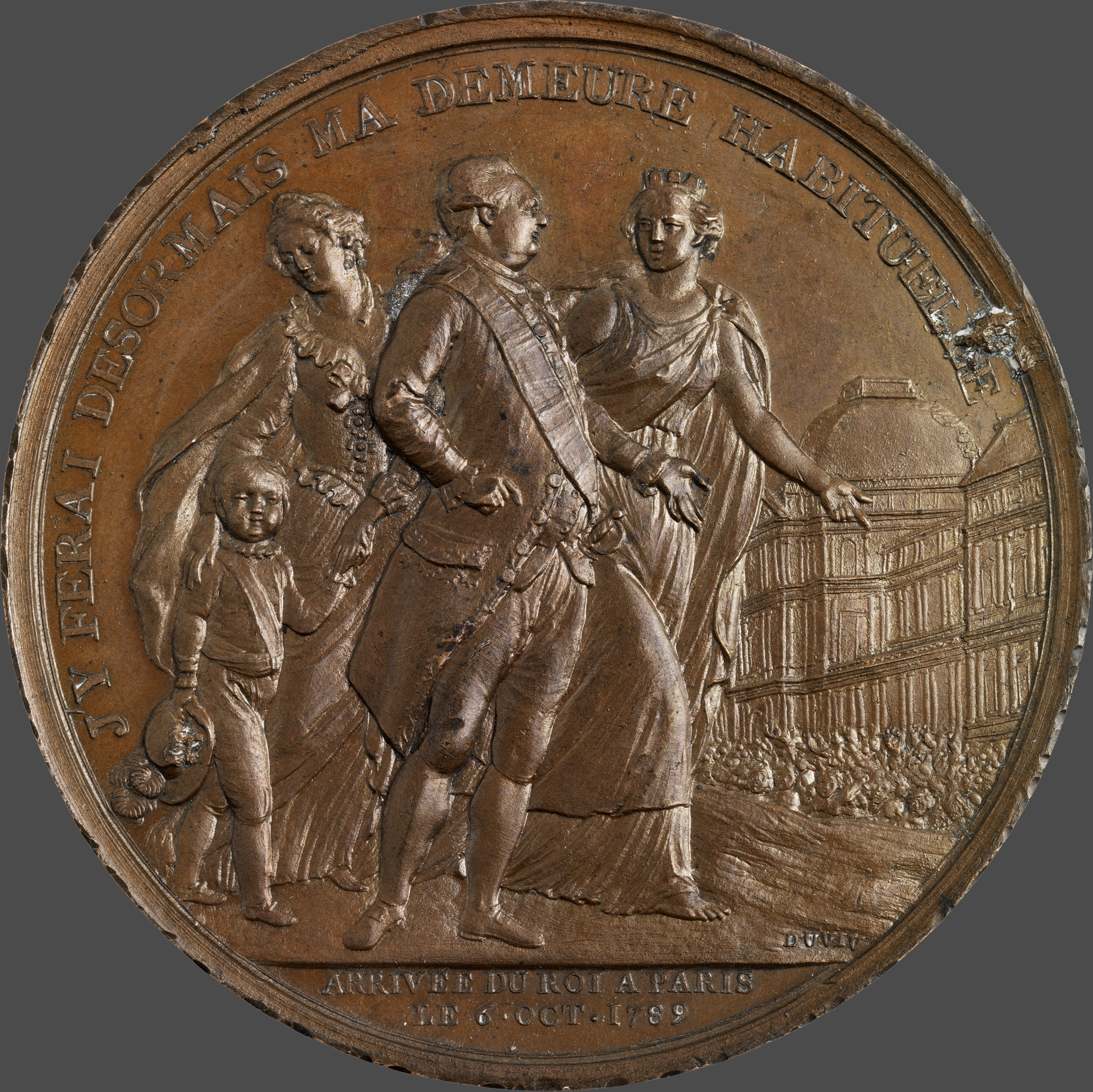
Medal commemorating the return of Louis XVI to Paris - 1789
