= Jean Duvivier =

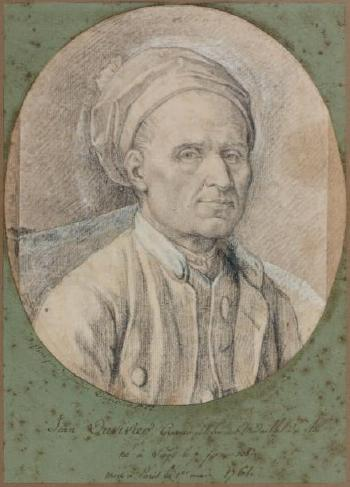
- Portrait of Jean Duvivier by his son, Benjamin
- Born: 1687; Liège
- Died: 30 April 1761 (aged 73–74)
- Known for: Medallist

Jean Duvivier (1687 – 30 April 1761) was a French medallist, who was appointed official medallist to King Louis XV.

Jean Duvivier was born in 1687 in Liège. He moved to Paris in 1710. In 1719 he was chosen by Louis XV as his official medallist, succeeding Jean Mauger (1648–1722). He was extremely prolific and engraved more than four hundred dies. He was made a member of the academy. He died on 30 April 1761 in Paris.

Jean Duvivier married Marie-Louise Vignon, who died on 28 September 1752. Their sons included Pierre-Louis-Isaac (baptized 23 May 1727), Pierre-Simon-Benjamin (baptized 5 November 1730) and Thomas-Germain-Joseph (baptized 31 August 1735). Duvivier's son Benjamin was also a graveur du roi (King's Engraver) and member of the academy. Pierre-Simon-Benjamin Duvivier (1728–1819) may have had more talent than his father. His daughter Jeanne-Louise-Françoise Duvivier married the engraver Jacques-Nicolas Tardieu and is on record as having made several engravings herself.

== Works ==
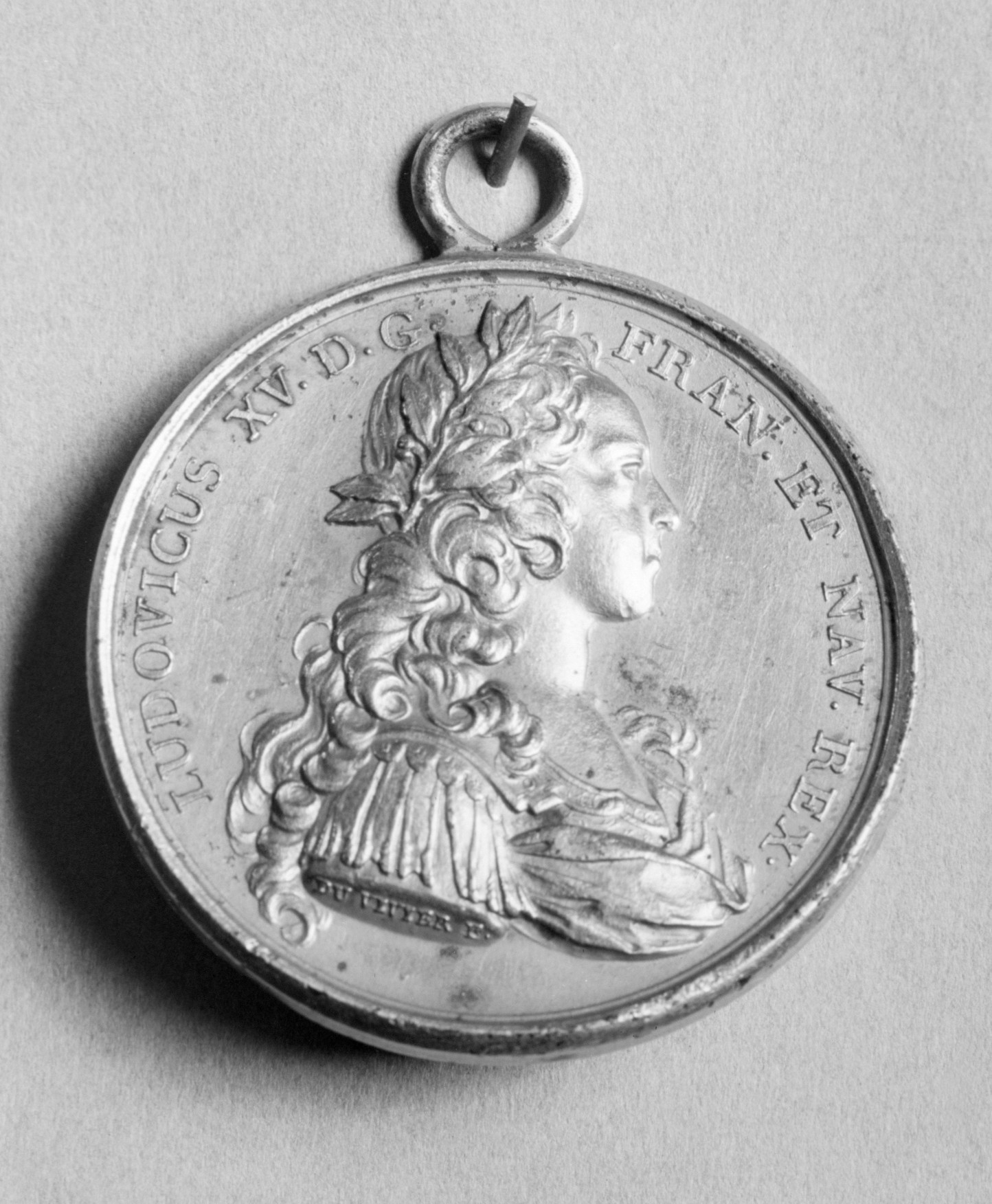
Louis XV (1715–1723)

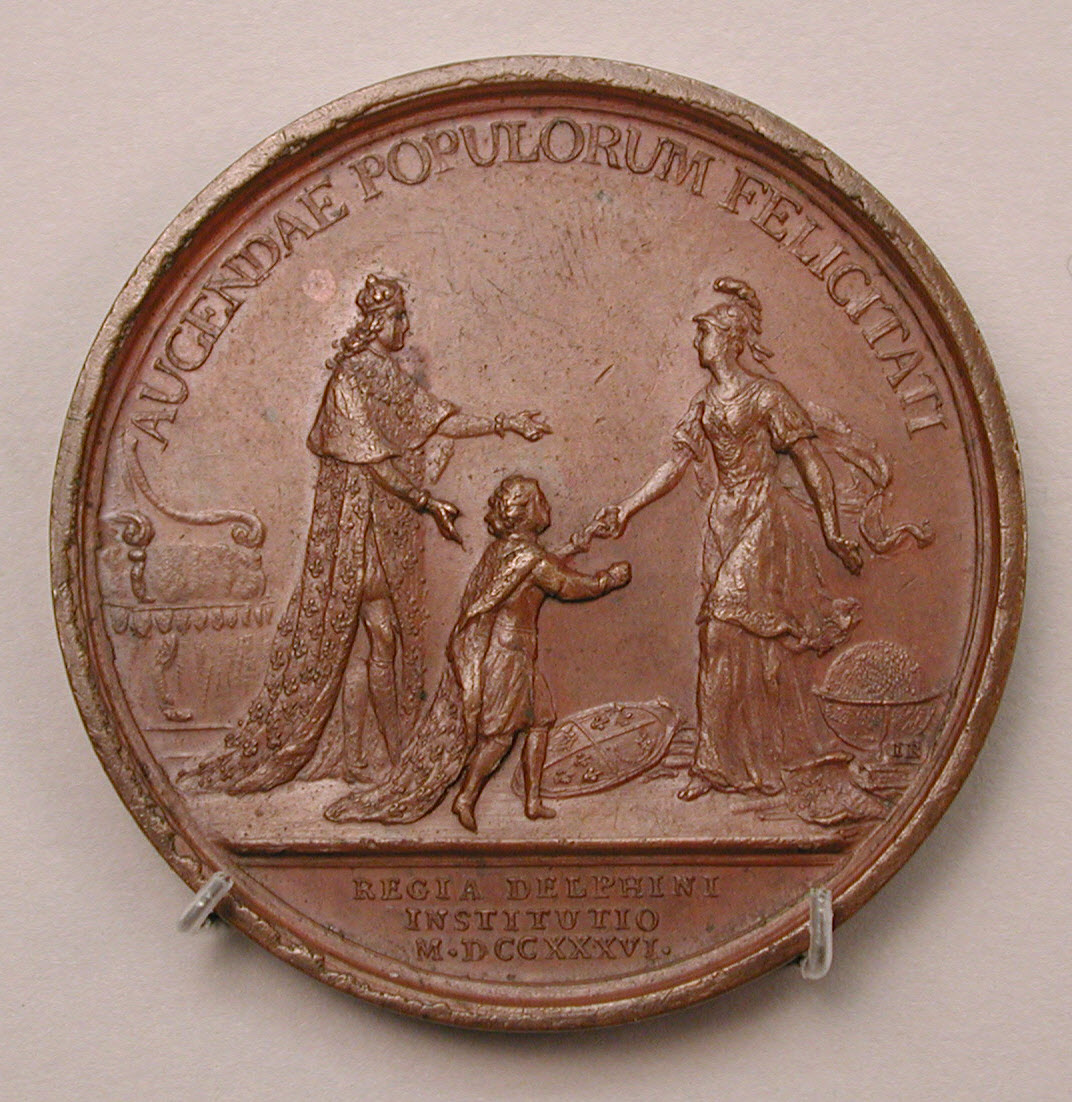
Royal Education of the Dauphin (1736)

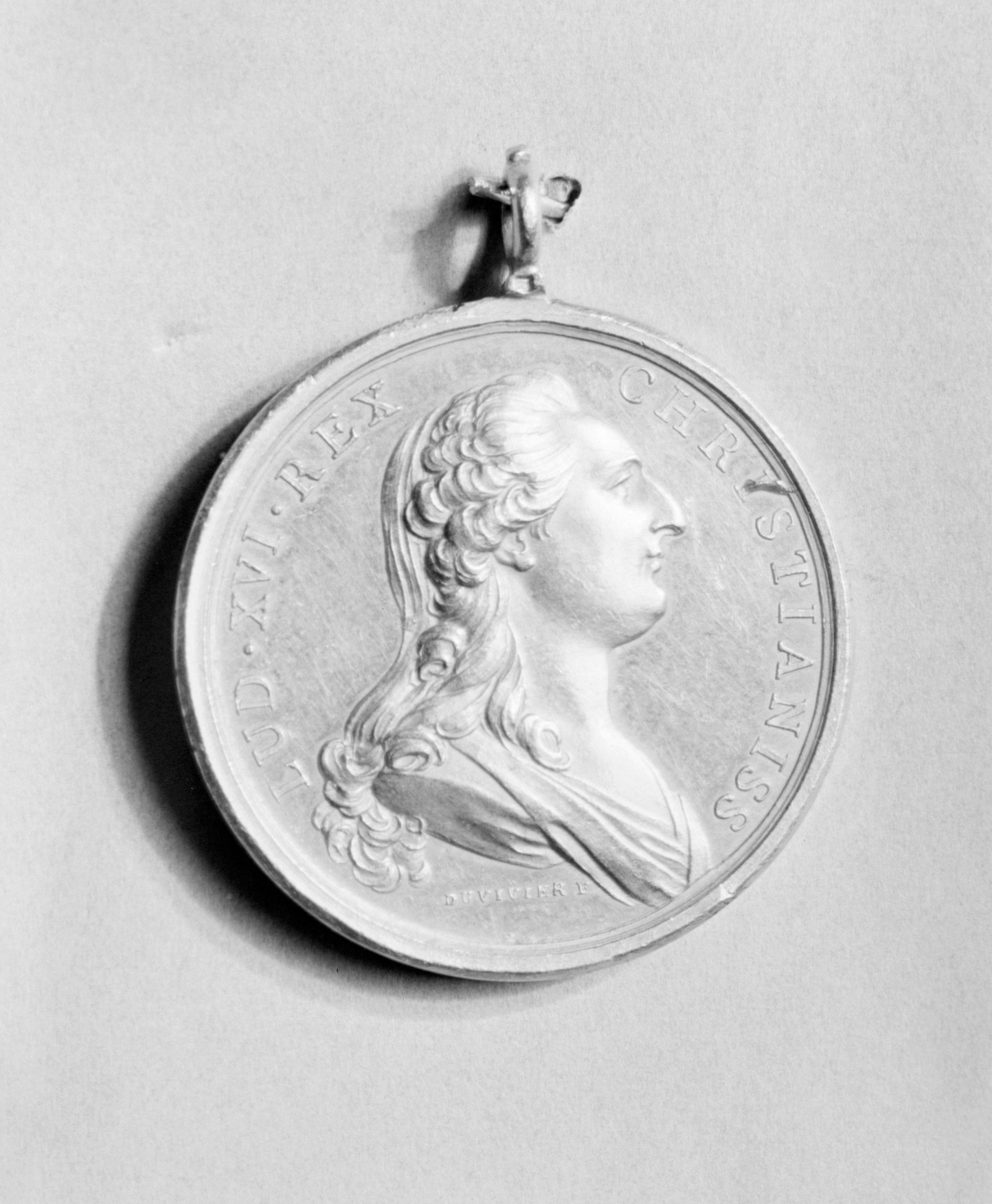
Louis XVI (1777)
