= Bon Boullogne =

French painter (1649–1717)

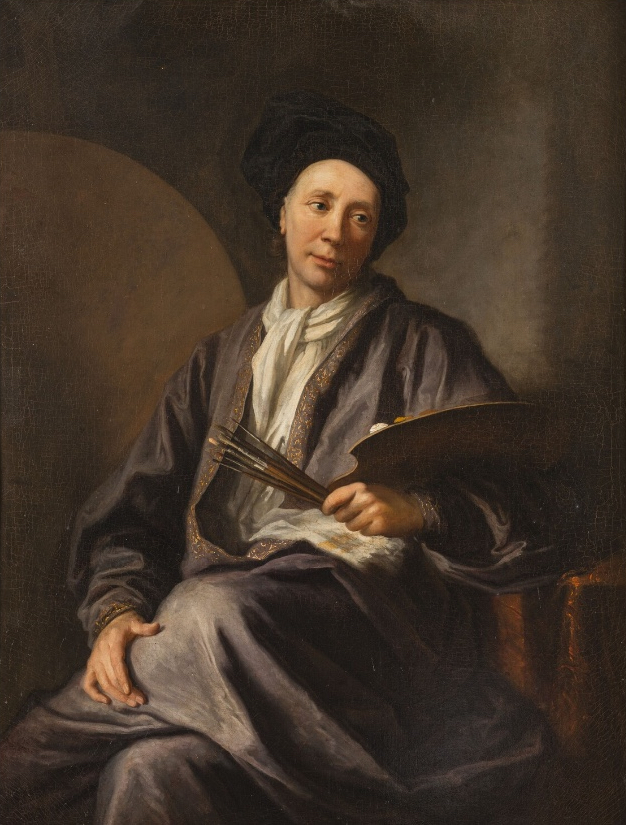
- Gilles Allou, Bon Boullogne, 1711, Palace of Versailles
- Born: 22 February 1649; Paris, Kingdom of France
- Died: 17 May 1717 (aged 68); Paris, Kingdom of France
- Known for: Painting
- Father: Louis Boullogne
- Relatives: Geneviève Boullogne (sister); Madeleine Boullogne (sister); Louis de Boullogne (brother)

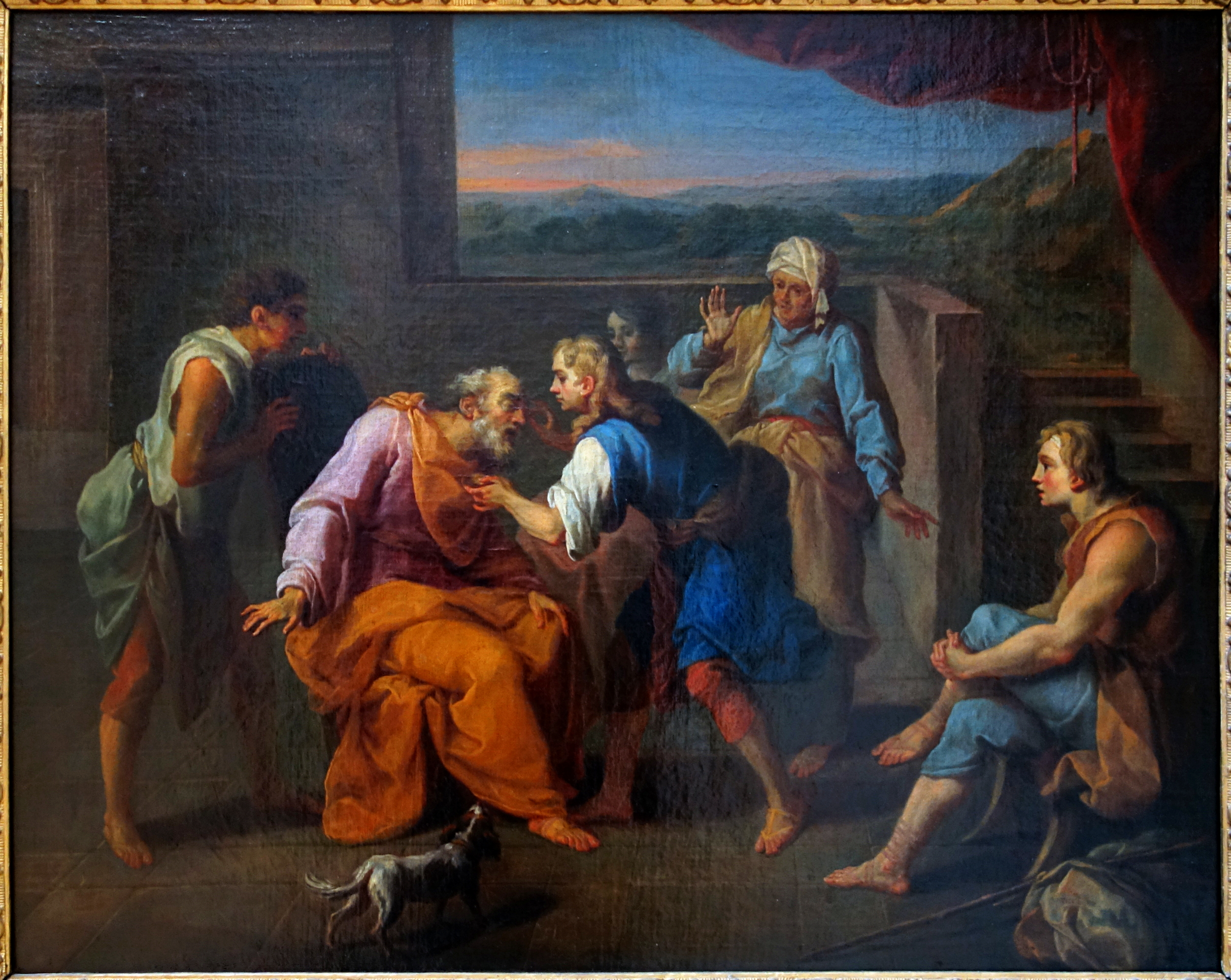
Tobias and Tobit, c. 1705, Palais des Beaux-Arts, Lille

Bon Boullogne (French pronunciation: [bɔ̃ bulɔɲ]; bapt. February 22, 1649 – May 17, 1717) was a French painter.

== Biography ==
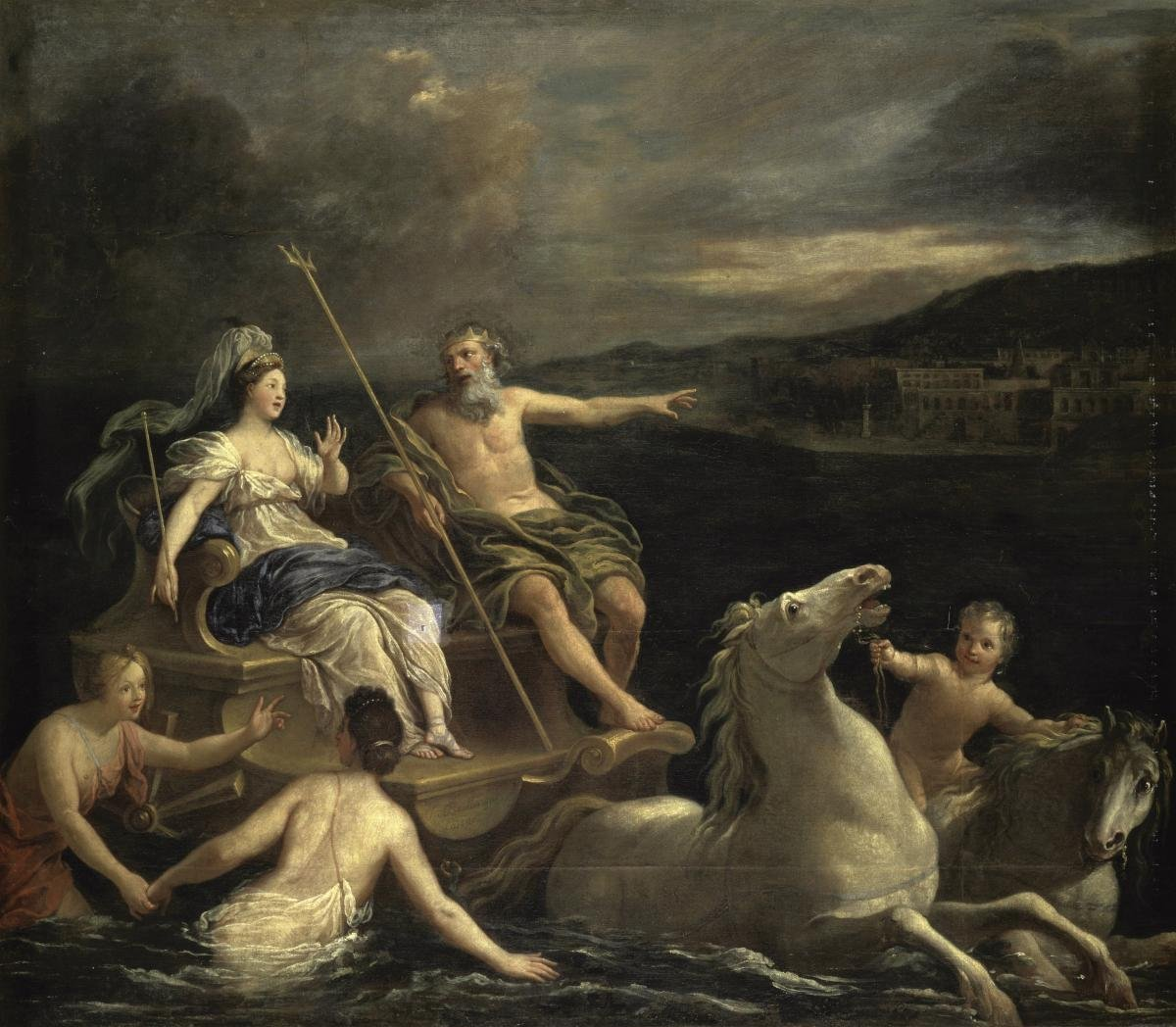
Neptune bringing Amphitrite in his marine chariot by Bon Boullogne (Musée des Beaux-Arts de Tours)

Boullogne was born in Paris, a son of the painter Louis Boullogne; he was regarded as the most gifted of his children. He took his first lessons from his father, whom he is thought to have assisted in the Grande Galerie of the Louvre. Through his father, who presented a half-length figure of St John by Bon to Jean-Baptiste Colbert, Contrôleur Général des Finances, he was sent to the Académie de France in Rome as a Pensionnaire du Roi. In this capacity, he made copies of famous works, in particular some frescoes by Raphael in the Vatican Loggie, intended for reproduction as Gobelins tapestries. The period he then spent in Lombardy helped to complete his training. He studied the work of Antonio da Correggio and the Annibale Carracci, as well as Guido Reni, Domenichino and Francesco Albani. Bon’s painting, especially the mythological work, shows great affinities with the work of the Bolognese school, which was also to be found in the royal collections. Also of influence to Bon was Nordic art, as demonstrated in his female portraits framed by plant like motifs, a device taken up by his pupil Robert Tournières. He died in Paris.

== Paintings ==
- Tobias fighting his father (c 1705), Palais des Beaux-Arts de Lille
- Jephtha's Daughter, Saint Petersburg, Hermitage Museum
- Saint Nicolas ressucitant les enfants, Montauban, Le Musée Ingres
- Emigration des Tectosages, Toulouse, Musée des Augustins
- Zéphyr et Flore, Musée des Beaux-Arts de Rouen
- Le Lavement de pieds, Dijon; Musée des beaux-arts
- Le Triomphe d'Amphitrite, Dijon, Musée Magnin
- L'enlèvement de Proserpine, Lisieux, Musée d'art et d'histoire de Lisieux
- Pan et Syrinx, Lisieux, Musée d'art et d'histoire de Lisieux
- Deux anges portant des instruments de musique, Versailles, Musée national du château et des Trianons
- Junon et Flore, Versailles, Musée national du château et des Trianons
- Hercule combat les centaures, Paris, Louvre
- La mort de Saint Ambroise, Paris, Louvre

== Students ==
- Nicolas Bertin
- Pierre-Jacques Cazes
- Joseph Christophe
- François Hutin
- Sébastien Leclerc
- Charles Parrocel
- Jean Raoux
- Jean-Baptiste Santerre
- Louis de Silvestre
- Robert Tournières
