= Madeleine Boullogne =

French artist (1646–1710)

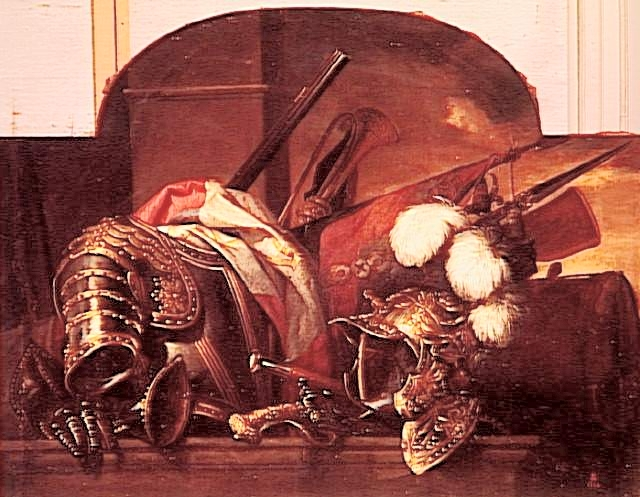
Trophys of War, Château de Versailles

Madeleine Boullogne (baptised 24 July 1646 – 30 January 1710) was a French Baroque still life painter.

== Biography ==
Boullogne was born in Paris. She was the daughter of Louis Boullogne, a painter and one of the founders of the Académie royale de peinture et de sculpture, and the sister of the painters Bon, Louis and Geneviève Boullogne. On 7 November 1669 she was received into the Académie royale de peinture et de sculpture. She began working in the royal workshops, notably at the Palais des Tuileries, where she painted four canvases for the antechamber to the Grand appartement du roi, but also at the Versailles, where she painted for the antechamber of the Grand appartement de la reine.

Madeleine Boullogne lived an austere and pious life, teaching many students, remaining unmarried and living with her brother Bon. Marked by a strict Augustinism bordering on Jansenism, she lived a semi-monastic life. Her presence in the Nécrologe de Port-Royal well shows this lifestyle:

She had received a singular gift from God in not being troubled as to impress in different occupations other than those that Providence presented her, making them with a whole presence of spirit, with peace and tranquility, dignified fruits with a wholly interior life. The painter who made his or her occupation does not turn, his eyes and hands being occupied with nothing but what his heart cares for. She did not paint anything other than paintings of piety, to honour the mysteries, to paint in herself the image of Jesus Christ suffering and dying, and to animate the imitation of the saints; without thinking, painting her own portrait. Daughter and sister of highly skilled painters, she took up and exercised the art of painting with such accuracy and delicacy, that she deserved her rank and seat in the Academie Royale de Peinture; the distinction gave her more regret than pride.

She painted many works on life at Port-Royal-des-Champs, that Louise-Magdeleine Horthemels then engraved and which were extremely popular. She also painted still lifes and many portraits, as well as many religious paintings.

Boullogne died in 1710 in Paris. She was forgotten little by little over the 18th century, with some of her paintings being attributed to others. She is best known for her paintings on Port-Royal, especially since many of her paintings at the Tuileries have disappeared and most of her work at Versailles was destroyed in the construction of the Galerie des Glaces.

== Works ==
- Salon of 1673: six paintings of trophies and one still life of fruits
- Salon of 1704: one still life of fruits, one still life of musical instruments
- Versailles, château, above the door to the antechamber of the Grand Couvert, 1673

== Notes and sources ==
- Caix de Saint-Aymour, Une famille d’artistes et de financiers : les Boullongne, Paris, Henri Laurens, 1919.
- Notice sur le site de la Société Internationale pour l’Étude des Femmes de l’Ancien Régime (SIEFAR) online text
- Dictionnaire de Port-Royal, sous la direction de Jean Lesaulnier et Anthony McKenna, Paris, Honoré Champion, 2004.
- Michel Faré, Le Grand Siècle de la nature morte, le XVIIe siècle, Paris, Fribourg, 1974, p. 245-9.
