= Jules-Romain Tardieu =

French writer, publisher and bookseller

- Born: 28 January 1805; Rouen
- Died: 19 July 1868 (aged 63); Paris
- Occupations: Writer, publisher and bookseller

Jules-Romain Tardieu (28 January 1805 – 19 July 1868) was a French writer, publisher and bookseller.

== Biography ==
Jules-Romain Tardieu was born on 28 January 1805 in Rouen, son of the painter Jean-Charles Tardieu. At the age of sixteen he joined the house of Antoine-Augustin Renouard. In 1837 he became an associate of Jules Renouard, Antoine's son and successor. When Jules Renouard died in 1854, he headed the publishing house for some time before founding another institution in 1856.

He was a member and secretary of several committees. He put a lot of energy into questions of literary property, in which his brother Amand-Louis Tardieu was also involved in Belgium. Tardieu also became a well-known author under the pseudonyms "J.-T. de Saint-Germain" and "abbé Paul".

He died on 19 July 1868 in Paris.

== Publications ==
- Lettre aux Éditeurs de Paris, 1848.
- L’Art d’être malheureux, légende, Paris, 1837, in-12.
- De la perpétuité en matière de littérature et d’art, Paris, 1858, in-8°.
- L’Art de lire les fables, Paris, 1859, in-18.
- La Feuille de Coudrier, Paris, 1859, in-32.
- Les Prestiges de la grandeur, Limoges, 1859, in-12 et in-32.
- Lady Clare, légende, Paris, 1858, in-18.
- La Veilleuse, Paris, 1859; 9th édit., 1870, in-18.
- Les Roses de Noël, Paris, 1860, in-18.
- Pour parvenir, Paris, 1861, 5th édit., 1869, in-12.
- Le Miracle des roses, opérette, musique de Luigi Bordèze, Paris, 1862, in-12.
- La Trêve de Dieu, Paris, 1862, 4th édit., Paris, 1869, in-18.
- Le Chalet d’Auteuil, Paris, 1862, in-18.
- La Feuille de Coudrier et la Fontaine de Médicis, légende, Paris, 1863, in-18.
- Le Livre des enfants qui ne savent pas lire, Paris, 1863, in-8°.
- Contes de Perrault, précédés d’une Notice, Paris, 1864, in-8°.
- Dolores, légende, Paris, 1864, in-18.
- La Turbotière, Paris, 1865, 1832.
- Éloge du luxe effréné des femmes. Paris, 1865, in-12.
- Les Extrêmes, petits recueils in-18 de nouvelles, légendes et poésies, 1866.
- Bébé ne sait pas lire.
- Quand Bébé saura lire.
- Les Trente-Six Volontés de Mademoiselle, Paris, 1866, in-8°.
- Lettres à la Dame de Cœur sur l’Exposition universelle, Paris, 1867, in-8°.
- Mignon, légende, 12th édit., Paris, 1869, in-18.
- Pour une épingle, Paris, 17th édit., 1870, in-8°.
