= Jean-Charles Tardieu =

French painter

- Born: 3 September 1765; Paris, France
- Died: 3 April 1830 (aged 64); Paris, France

Jean-Charles Tardieu, also called "Tardieu-Cochin" (3 September 1765 – 3 April 1830) was a successful French painter during the ages of Napoleon and of the Bourbon Restoration. His work was primarily historical, but also included landscapes, portraits and religious subjects.

== Biography ==
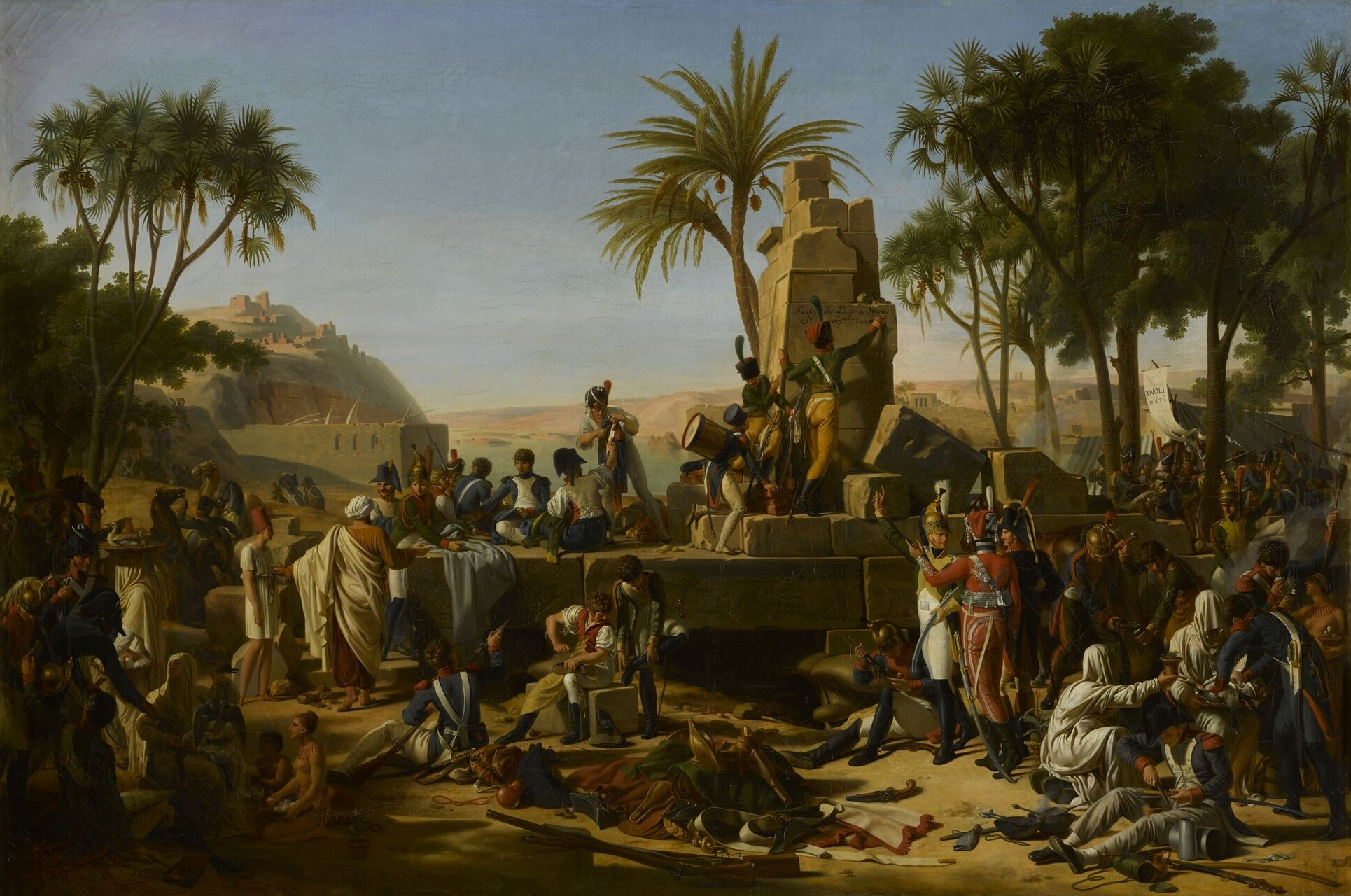
Halte de l'armée française à Syène 2 février 1799

Jean-Charles Tardieu was born on 3 September 1765 in Paris, son of Jacques-Nicolas Tardieu and Elisabeth Claire Tournay. His father and his grandfather, Nicolas-Henri Tardieu, were both members of the Academy and the King's engravers. His father's cousin was the engraver Charles-Nicolas Cochin, who left him a small legacy when he died in 1790. Cochin also treated him as a sort of pupil and gave him advice. He was formally placed under Jean-Baptiste Regnault for his artistic training. He failed to get the Grand Prix de Rome, but the second prize of the Prix de Rome was awarded to him in 1790. His father died on 9 July 1791.

A passionate artist with great skill in composition, Tardieu exhibited in various salons, and achieved considerable success. He took part in a number of exhibitions in the Louvre between 1806 and 1823. In 1808 he was granted a housing allowance. The great majority of his works were bought by the government or commissioned by the government.

Tardieu had excellent connections and seems to have been fully employed during the reigns of Napoleon, Louis XVIII, and Charles X of France. Several of his works were bought for the house of the latter sovereign. He made a large number of tableaux for the government, which were placed in the Luxembourg, Versailles, Saint-Cloud, Fontainebleau and Compiègne palaces and also at the Musée des Beaux-Arts de Rouen, Musée des Beaux-Arts et d'archéologie de Besançon, Rouen Cathedral, Nîmes Cathedral and Lons-le-Saulnier Cathedral.

In his later years, Tardieu worked on religious tableaux and landscapes. Tardieu died in Paris on 3 April 1830. His son Jules-Romain Tardieu was born in Rouen on 28 January 1805. Jules was to become a connoisseur of the arts and letters, a writer, publisher and bookseller, and a member of the Academy of Caen.

== Œuvres ==
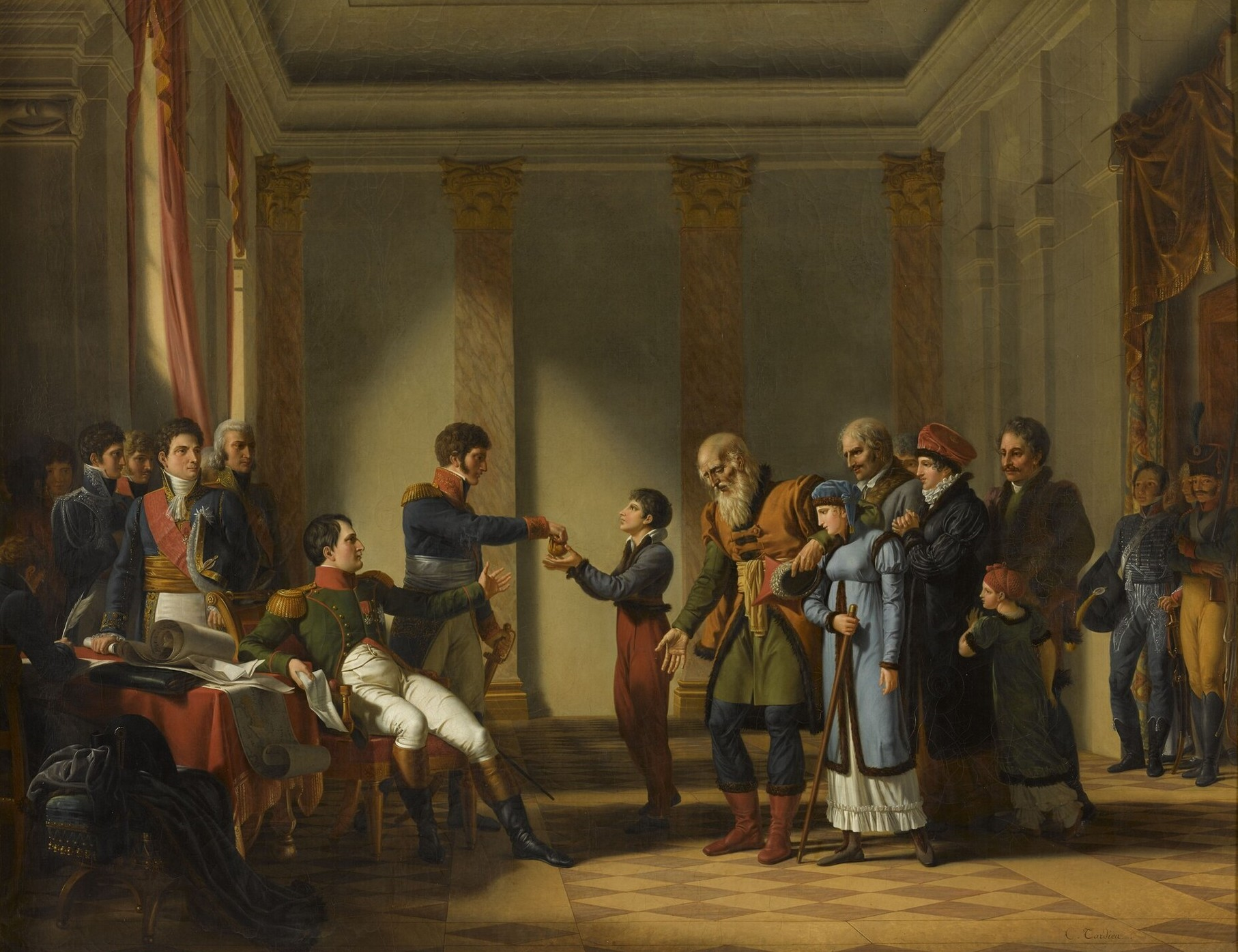
Trait de bienfaisance de Napoléon Ier pendant la campagne de Pologne en janvier 1807.

Tardieu-Cochin's work was primarily historical. He often took classical and poetic subjects. He also made copies of several paintings of saints by Philippe de Champaigne that were commissioned by the king's house. Almost all his works are held in public collections including, among others, those in the Rouen Cathedral, and in the museums of Besançon, Le Havre, Marseille and Versailles. Among the most successful are Halte en Égypte, Jean Bart à la cour, la Conversion du duc de Joyeuse, Frédéric-Guillaume chez le grand Frédéric, Louis XVIII à Mittau et l’Aveugle au marché des Innocents.

=== Paintings ===
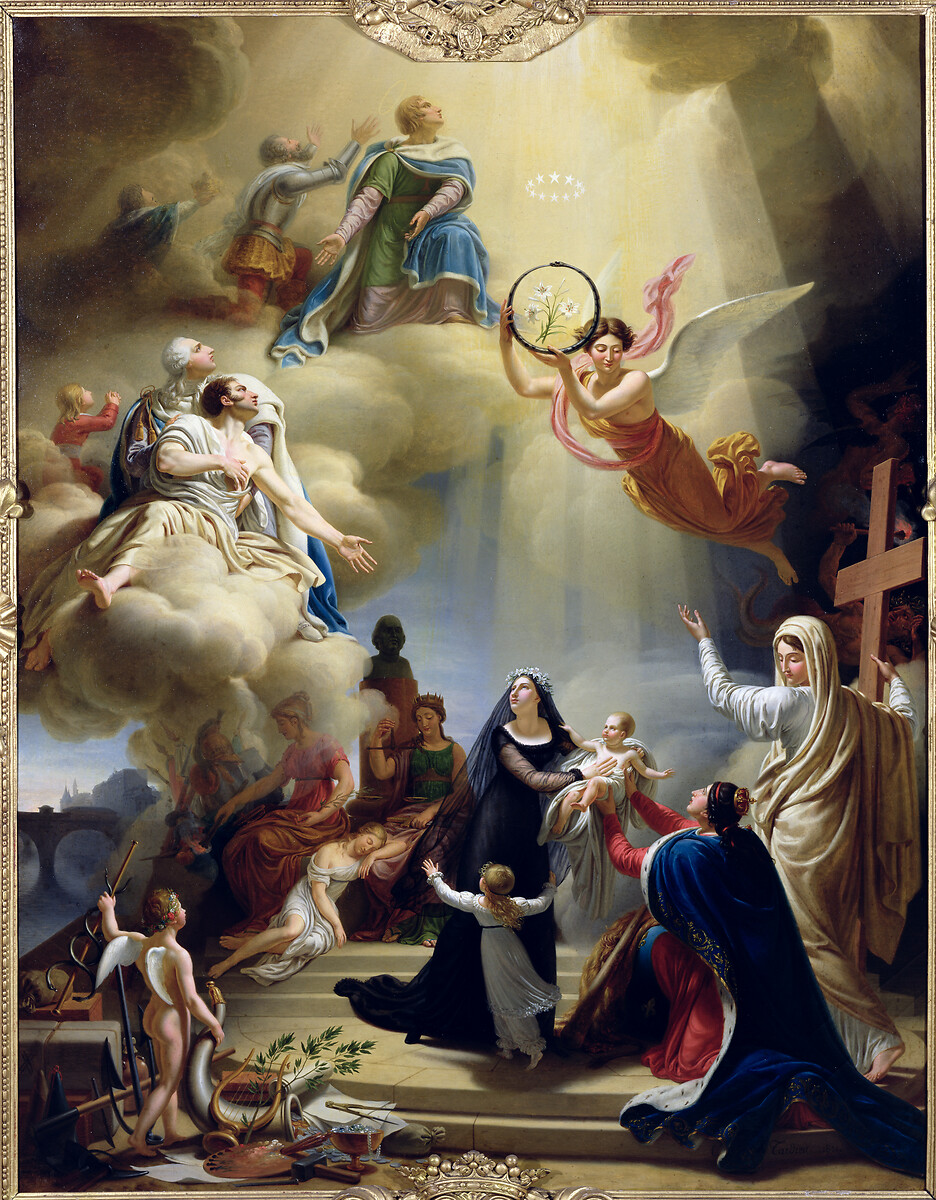
Allegory in Honour of the Birth of Henri de France (1820–83), Duke of Bordeaux

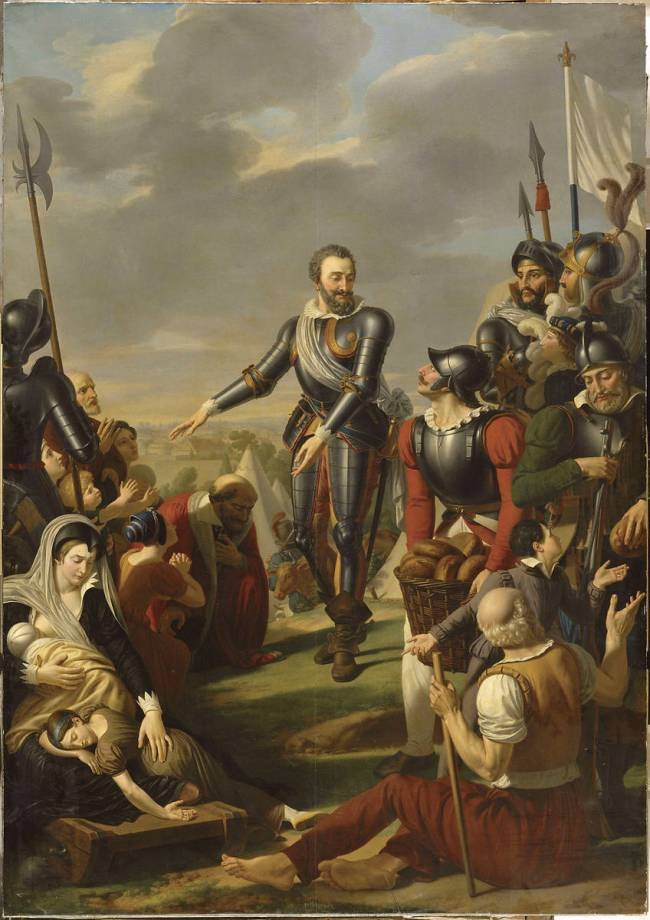
Henri IV devant Paris Aout 1590

Some of the more notable of Tardieu's paintings:

Year	Title	Location
1806	La Mort du Corrège	
1808	Napoléon reçoit la reine de Prusse à Tilsitt. 6 juillet 1807	Versailles
1810	Un officier français faisant soigner un prisonnier arabe après le siège de Benhout	
1810	Un jeune homme entre le vice et la vertu	
1812	Narocki, polonais, âgé de 117 ans, est présenté à Napoleon, qui lui faite une pension	
1812	Halte de l’armée française à Syène, en Égypte. 2 février 1799	Versailles
1814	Frédéric-Guillaume chez le grand Frédéric	
1814	Une scène du marché des Innocents	Paris, Musée du Louvre
1817	Louis XVIII fait une rosiere a Mitau	
1817	Jean Bart à la cour de Versailles	Paris, Musée du Louvre
1817	Le Cri de l’innocence	
1819	Clio inspirée à la vue dit buste de Louis XVIII	Versailles
1819	La Conversion du duc de Joyeuse	Meaux, Musée Bossuet
1819	Suzanne au bain	Le Havre, Musée d'Art Moderne André Malraux
1819	Une famille de Centaures	
1822	Allégorie sur la naissance du duc de Bordeaux	Rouen, Musée des Beaux-Arts de Rouen
1822	Trait de clémence de Louis XII	
1822	La Samaritaine	Rouen Cathedral

Other notable works include:

- Ulysse reconnu par Euryclée, Marseille, Musée des beaux-arts de Marseille
- Agamède et Trophonius
- Jésus-Christ chez Marthe et Marie
- Première messe de saint Vincent de Paul
- Un veuf au tombeau de fa femme
- Les Bacchanales

In addition, public collections hold the following:

- Bienfaisance de Napoleon 1er envers Narocki, vieillard polonais de 117 ans qui lui est présenté, Palace of Versailles
- Halte d’Henri IV en forêt après la bataille d’Ivry, 1802 ou 1807, Pau, Pyrénées-Atlantiques, Château de Pau
- Halte d’Henri IV en forêt, Pau, Musée national du château de Pau
- Henri IV devant Paris. Aout 1590, Versailles
- Henri IV fait distribuer des vivres pendant le siège de Paris en aout 1590, Versailles
- La Clémence de Louis XII en avril 1498, Versailles
- La Justification de Suzanne, Toulouse, Musée des Augustins;
- Le roi Louis XVIII en exil à Mittau y couronne la rosière, 1799, Versailles
- Sully aux pieds d’Henri IV, Pau, Musée national du château de Pau
- Trophenius et Agamède, Besançon Museum

=== Gallery ===
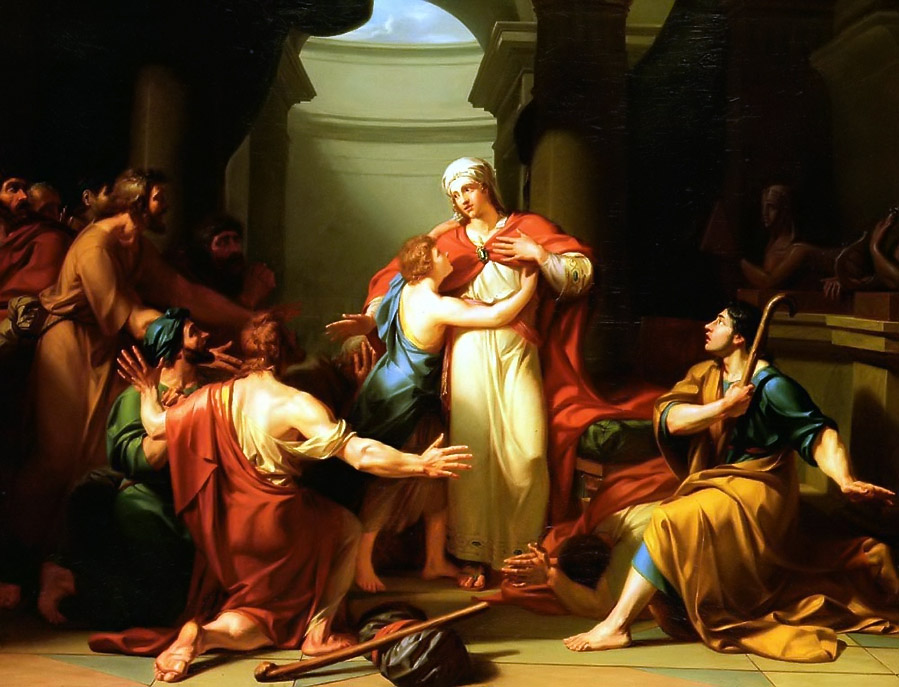
Joseph Recognized by His Brothers, 1788

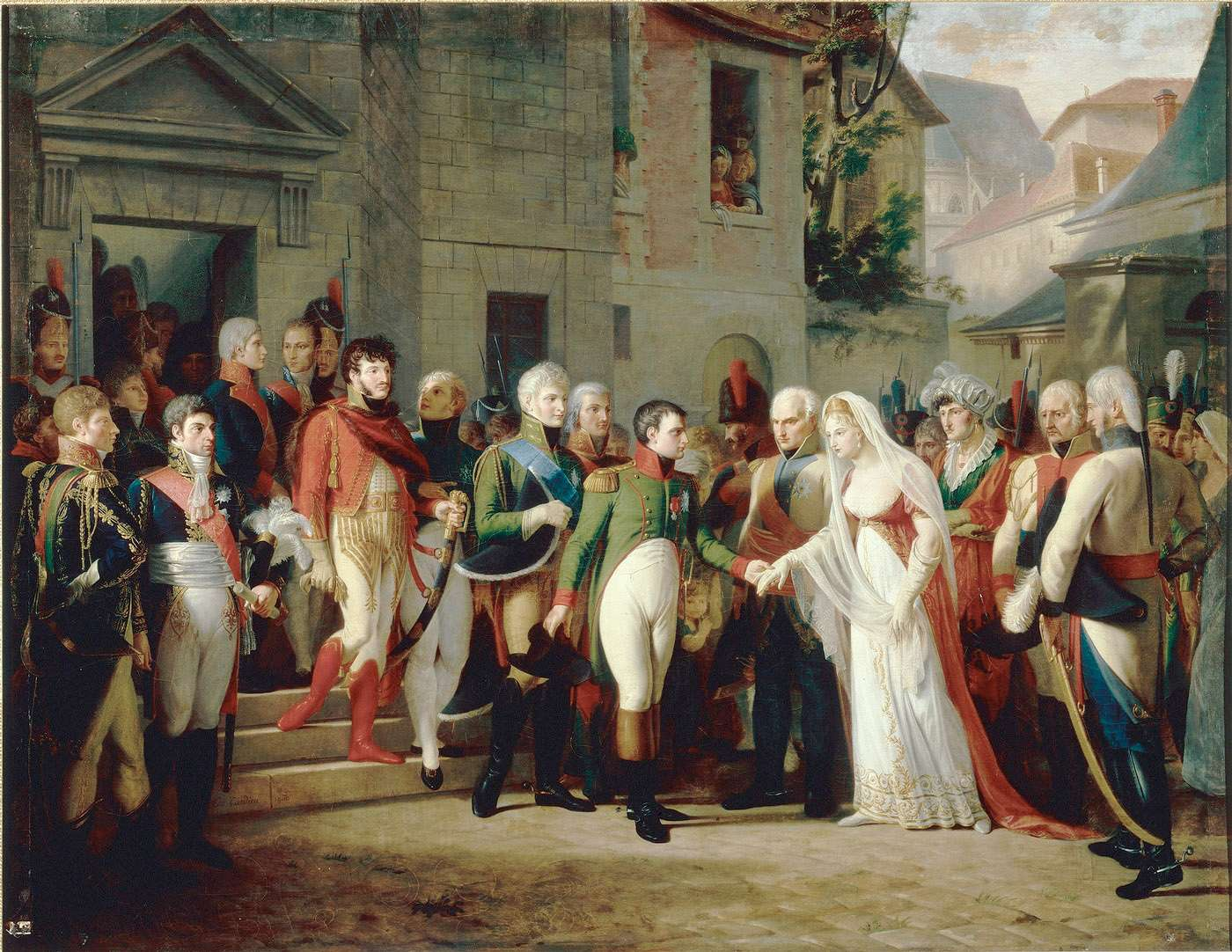
Napoléon reçoit la reine de Prusse à Tilsit, 1808

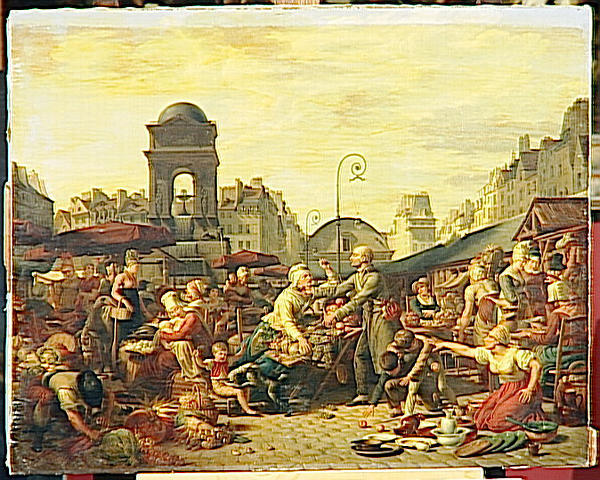
Une Scene du Marche des Innocents, 1814. Paris: Musée du Louvre département des Peintures

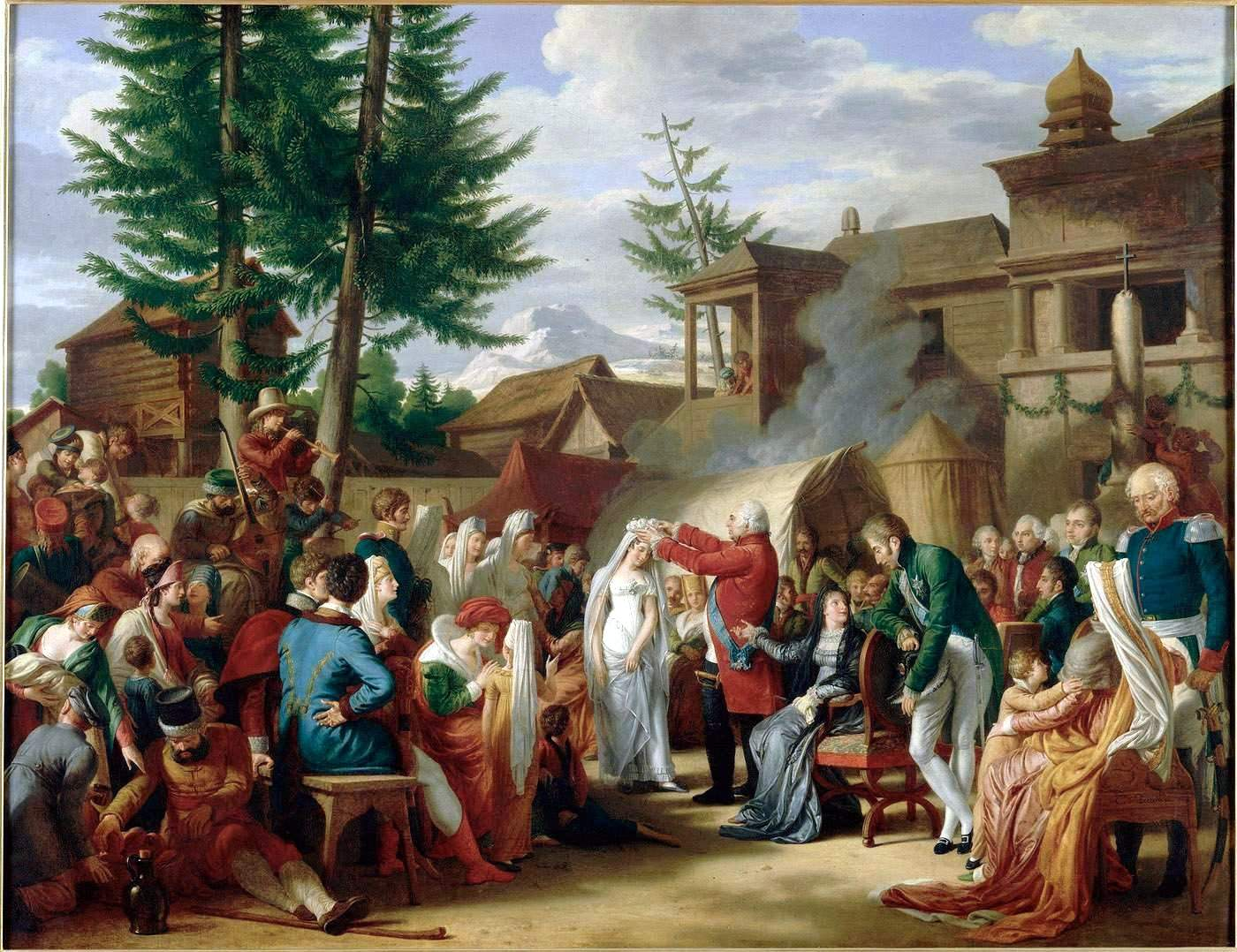
Louis XVIII couronne la rosière de Mittau. 1799, 1817

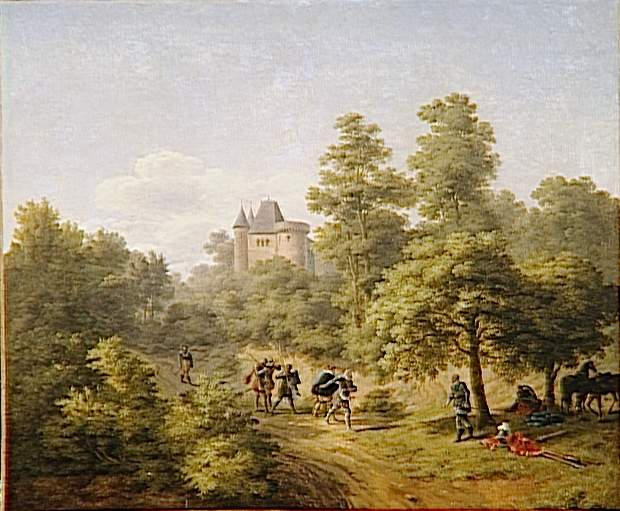
Halte d'Henri IV en forêt. Pau: Musée national du château de Pau

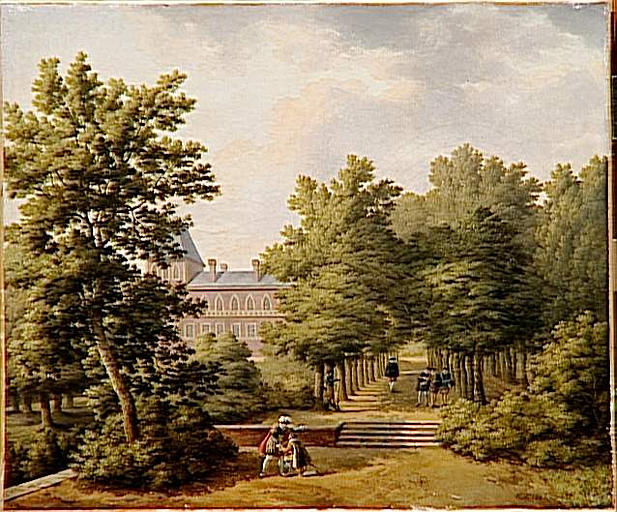
Sully aux pieds d'Henri IV. Pau: Musée national du château de Pau

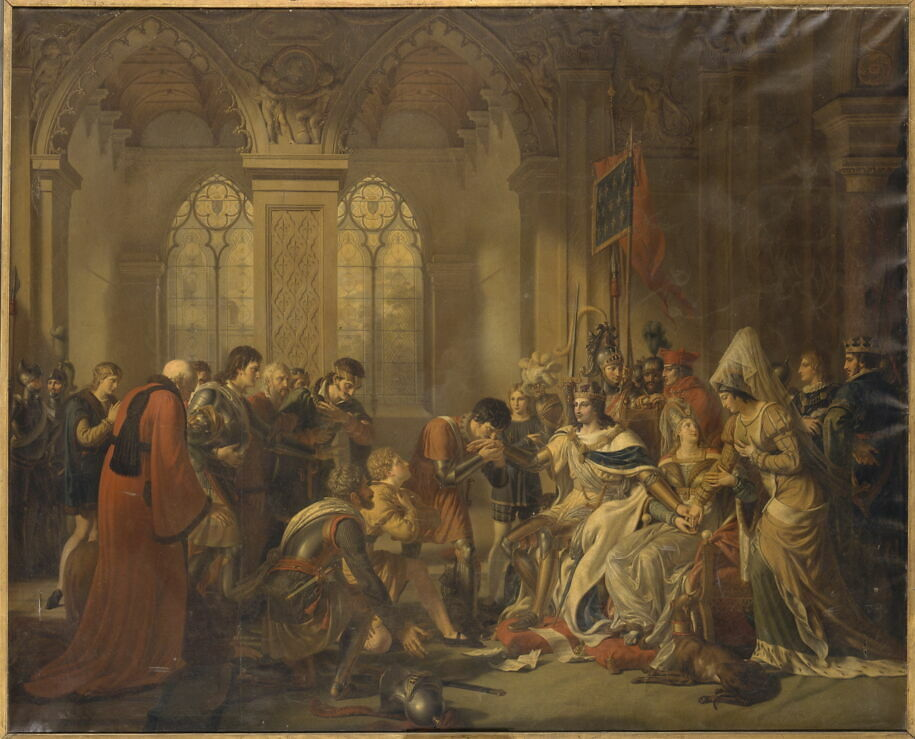
La Clemence de Louis XII. Avril 1498. Versailles: musée national des châteaux de Versailles et de Trianon
