= Gilles Allou =

French painter

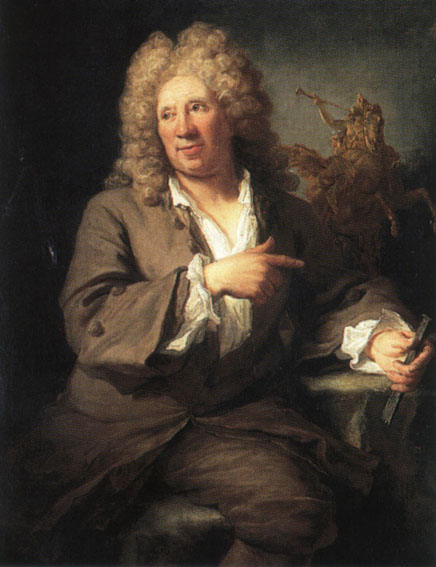
Portrait of Antoine Coysevox (Versailles)

Gilles Allou (1670–1751) was a French painter. He was a well-known portrait painter in his time, but is little known today.

Gilles Allou was born in 1670. The Allou family came from Beauvaisis. On 8 July 1702 Gilles Allou, architect, son of the jeweler Philippe Allou and of Elisabeth Calippe, married Marie Raguenet. They had three children.

It was not until 1710 that Allou's application for membership in the Royal Academy of Painting and Sculpture was approved, and this was on the basis that he submitted three reception pieces, although normally only two were required. He was granted full membership of the academy in 1722 after he submitted portraits of the Academicians Antoine Coysevox (1640–1720), Antoine Coypel (1661–1722) and Bon Boullogne (1648–1717). Salon records describe about thirty portraits, including one now found in Nashville, TN, although most have been lost.

The engraver Jacques-Nicolas Tardieu engraved Allou's portrait of Bon Boullogne for his Academy reception piece on 25 October 1749. Allou died on 3 February 1751 at the age of eighty one.

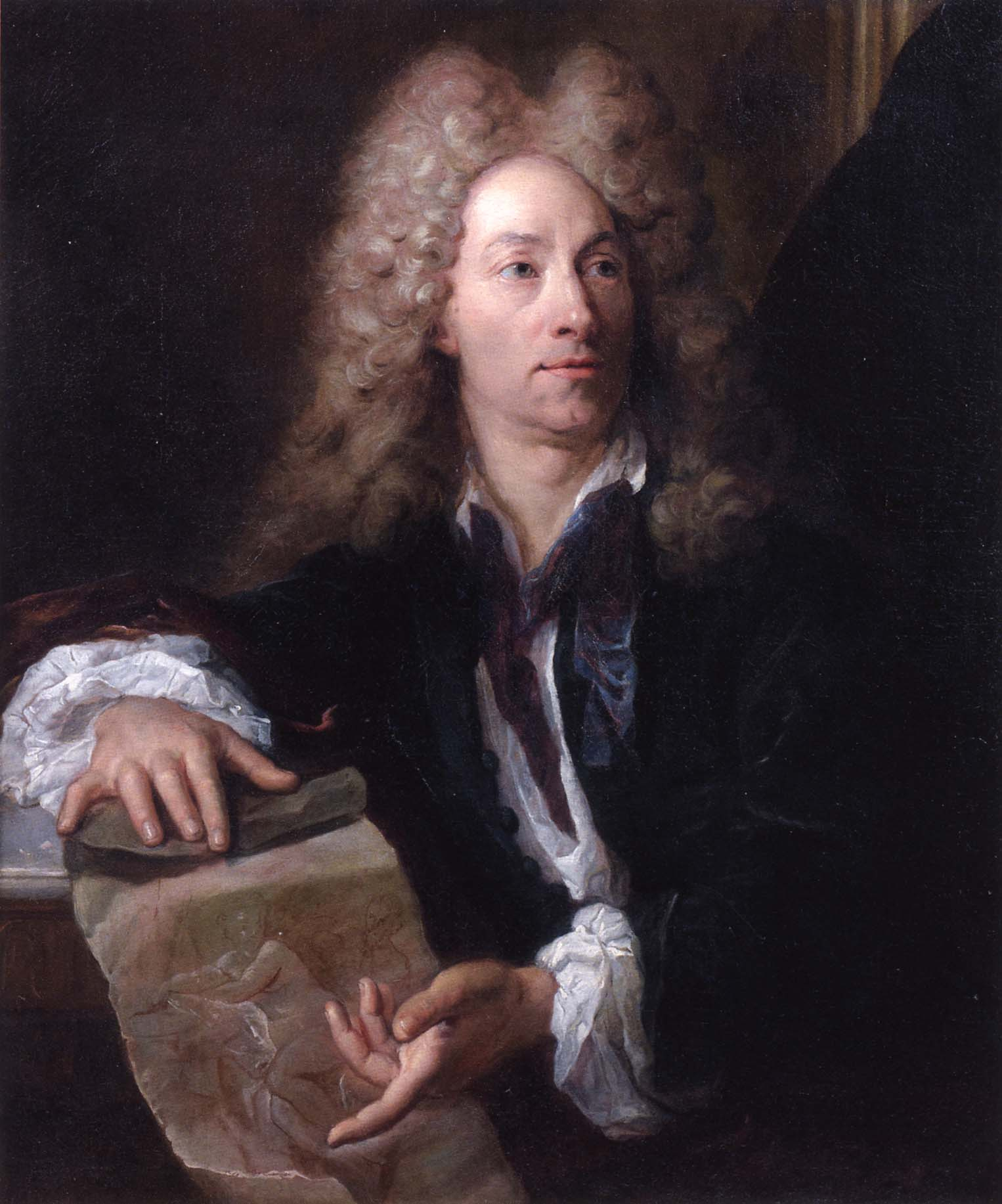
Portrait of Louis de Boullongne.
