= Musée d'art et d'histoire de Lisieux =

Museum in Lisieux, France

Coordinates: 49°08′40″N 0°13′10″E

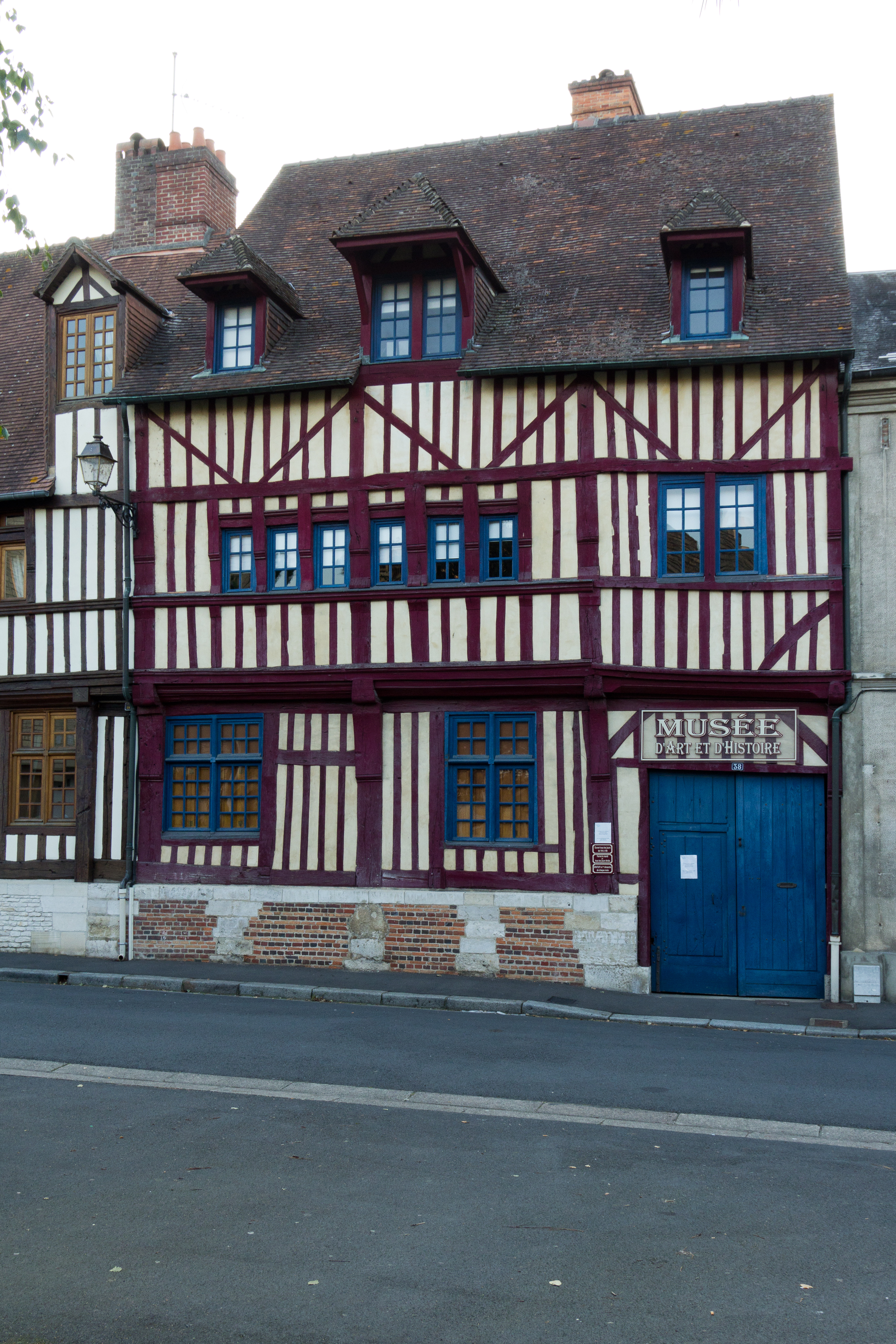
The Museum in 2011

The Musée d'art et d'histoire de Lisieux is the city museum of the town of Lisieux, located in the Calvados department of the Normandy region, in northwestern France.

It holds an important permanent collection, including ancient Gallo-Roman archaeological objects, ethnographic objects from the local Pays d'Auge area, and ceramics from Pré d'Auge.
