= Pierre Louis Dumesnil =

French painter

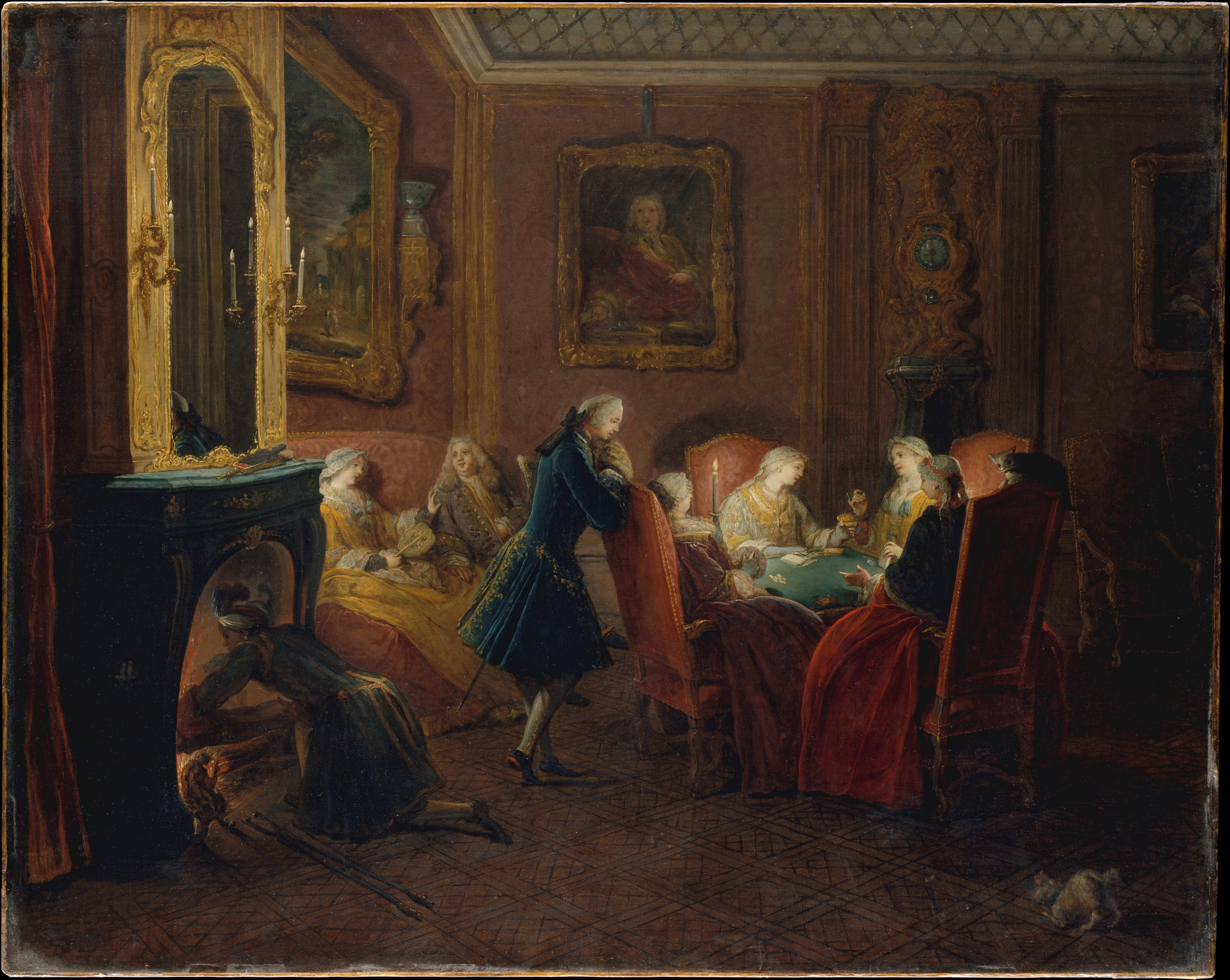
Card Players in a Drawing Room by Pierre Louis Dumesnil the younger, Metropolitan Museum of Art

Pierre-Louis Dumesnil (French: [dymɛnil]; 1698–1781) was a French painter who specialized in genre scenes. He was born and died in Paris.

== Biography ==
Pierre-Louis Dumesnil was born in 1698. He was received into the Académie de Saint-Luc. There he was professor (1748-1773), rector (1773-1775), and then permanent rector (1775-1776). Between 1751 et 1754 his work was shown as each of the seven exhibitions of the institution. Although some of his works were historical, such as Saint Charles Borromée faisant l’aumône (1741), most were genre scenes. His paintings show the influence of Jean-Baptiste Chardin both in the selection of themes and the composition. A portrait of Dumesnil by madame Vigée-Lebrun, created in 1774 on the occasion of her reception into the Académie de Saint-Luc, has unfortunately been lost.

== Works ==
- Saint Charles Borromée faisant l’aumône, 1741, huile sur toile, 215 x 116 cm, collection particulière.
- Un jeune abbé de catéchisme qui reçoit un jeune enfant amené par sa sœur, 1752, Musée Carnavalet, Paris.
- Une mère qui regarde jouer ses enfants, 1752, Musée Carnavalet, Paris.
- Une chambre où une servante habille des enfants, 1752, Musée Carnavalet, Paris.
- Le Traitant, huile sur toile, 32 x 41 cm, Musée des Beaux-Arts, Bordeaux.
- Une petite fille allant à l’école, huile sur toile (transposition), 1753(?), 100 x 79 cm, Musée du Louvre, Paris.
