= Dumonstier =

Dumonstier is a surname. Notable people with the surname include:

- Daniel Dumonstier (1574–1646), French artist
- Étienne Dumonstier 1540–1603), French Renaissance portrait painter
- Pierre Dumonstier I (c. 1545 – c. 1610), French artist
- Pierre Dumonstier II (1585–1656), French artist
