= Pierre Dumonstier =

Pierre Dumonstier may refer to:

- Pierre Dumonstier I
- Pierre Dumonstier II
