= Charles-Philippe de Chennevières-Pointel =

French writer and art historian

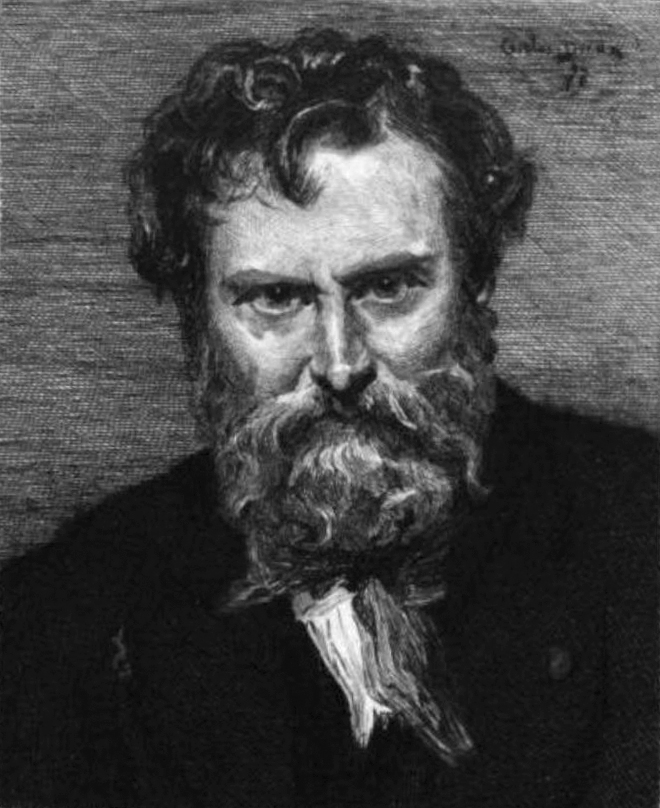
- Charles-Philippe de Chennevières-Pointel after a portrait by Carolus-Duran
- Born: Charles-Philippe de Chennevières; 23 July 1820; Falaise
- Died: 1 April 1899 (aged 78); 7th arrondissement of Paris
- Other name: Jean de Falaise
- Education: University of Liège
- Known for: writer and playwright
- Children: Henry of Chennevières
- Parent: Marie Charlotte Fouchard

Charles-Philippe, marquis de Chennevières-Pointel, known as Jean de Falaise (23 July 1820, Falaise – 1 April 1899) was a French writer and art historian.

== Life and career ==
Chennevières was a learned connoisseur and collected thousands of French drawings from 1500 to 1860. His friends included Charles Baudelaire, Theophile Gautier and the Goncourt brothers. He served in the arts administration of the Second Empire (1851-1870). He joined the Louvre in 1846, and later became its curator from 1852 to 1870, and was responsible for the Fine Arts exhibition at the 1855 Paris World's Fair. In 1873, Chennevières became the Director of the national École des Beaux-Arts (School of Fine Arts).

From March 8 to June 7, 2007, selections from his collection of drawings were the subject of an exhibition at the Louvre museum, "Philippe de Chennevières - Collector of French 19th Century Drawings".

== Works ==
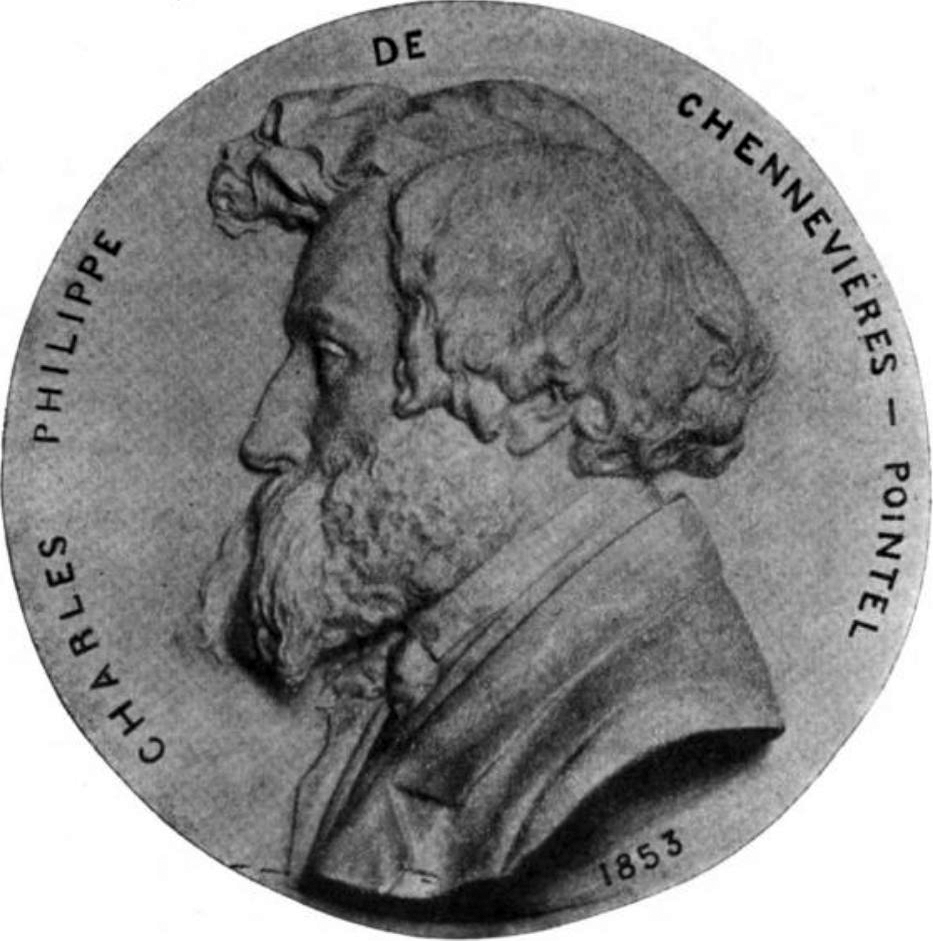
Chennevières-Pointel par Le Harivel-Durocher.

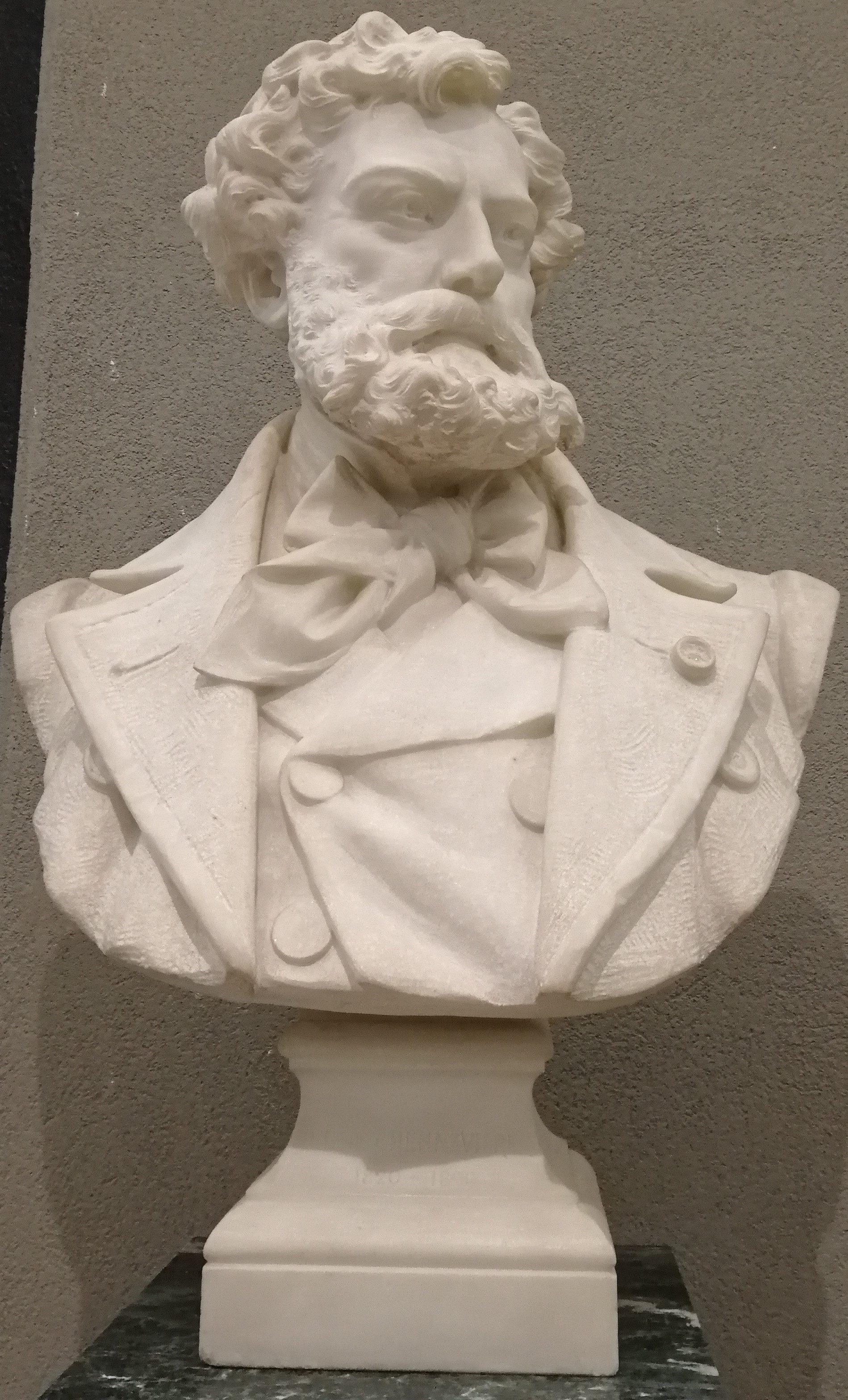
Marble bust of Chennevières-Pointel, 1902, Musée d'Orsay

- Essai politique d’un cousin de Charlotte Corday, Nogent-le-Rotrou, Gouverneur, 1871;
- Essais sur l’histoire de la peinture française, Paris, 1894;
- Essais sur l’organisation des arts en Province, Paris, J.-B. Dumoulin, 1852;
- Historiettes baguenaudières par un Normand, Aix, Aubin, 1845 ;
- Inauguration de la statue de Nicolas Poussin aux Andelys, Argentan, Barbier, 1851;
- Les Décorations du Panthéon, Paris, l’Artiste, 1885;
- Les Derniers Contes de Jean de Falaise, 1860;
- Lettres rurales, Mamers, J. Fleury, 1872;
- Lettres sur l’art français en 1850, Argentan, Barbier, 1851;
- Notes d’un compilateur sur les sculpteurs et les sculptures en ivoire, Amiens, Lenoel-Herourt, 1857;
- Notice historique et descriptive sur la Galerie d’Apollon au Louvre, Paris, Pillet fils aîné, 1851;
- Notice sur M. le Bon Taylor, Paris, Firmin-Didot, 1881;
- Portraits inédits d’artistes français, Paris, Vignères, Rapilly, 1855–69;
- V. Le Harivel-Durocher, Bellême, G. Levayer, 1898;
- Souvenirs d’un directeur des beaux-arts, Paris, L’Artiste, 1883-1889; réimp. Paris, Arthéna, 2001;
- Suzanne ou la terre normande, Paris, L’Artiste, 1883-1889; réimp. Paris, Arthéna, 2001;
- Notice sur la galerie d’Apollon, 1851;
- Essai sur l’organisation des arts en province, 1852;
- Les Aventures du petit roi saint Louis devant Bellesme, 1865;
- Contes percherons, Nogent-le-Rotrou, 1869;
- Les Caprices de Manette, 1878;
- Les Dessins de maires anciens, exposés à l’École des Beaux-Arts en 1879, 1880;
- Les Dessins du Louvre, 1882–1884.
