= The Death of Saint Bruno =

Painting by Eustache Lesueur

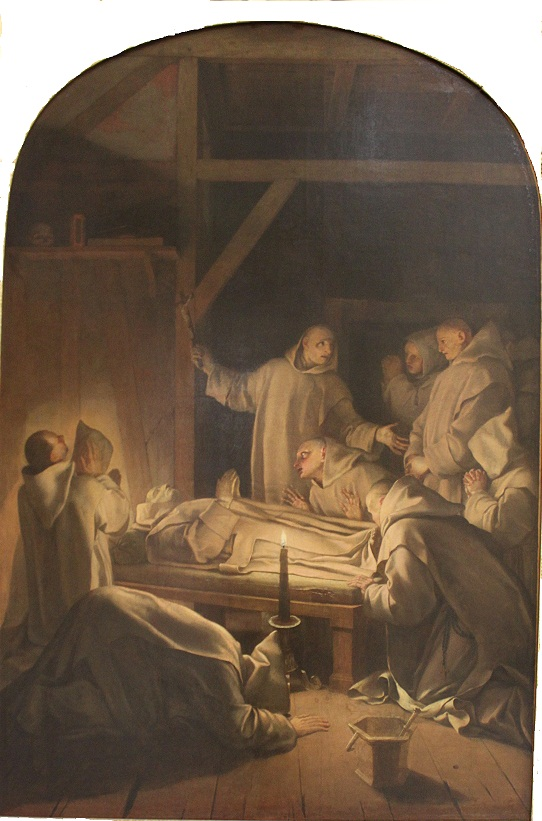

The Death of Saint Bruno is a 1645–1648 oil on canvas painting by Eustache Lesueur, the last in a cycle of 22 paintings of episodes from the life of Bruno of Cologne produced for the walls of the minor cloister of the couvent des Chartreux in Paris and in 1776 offered to Louis XVI by the Couvent. It is now in the Louvre Museum.

== Bibliography ==
- (in French) Charles de Pougens, Galerie de Lesueur, ou Collection de tableaux représentant les principaux traits de la vie de S. Bruno, faisant suite au Cours de peinture, ou Musée de M. Filhol, dessinée et gravée par Georges Malbeste, accompagnée de sommaires descriptifs et de notices sur la vie de S. Bruno et sur celle de Lesueur, 1825.
- (in French) Alain Mérot, Eustache Le Sueur, 1616-1655, éd.Arthena, 1987.
- (in French) Alain Mérot, Eustache Le Sueur 1616-1655, 2000, éd. Arthena ISBN 2-903239-26-6
- (in French) Ludovic Vitet, « Eustache Lesueur », Revue des Deux Mondes, 4e série, tome 27, 1841.
