= Arthena =

French publisher

Arthena or Association pour la Diffusion de l'Histoire de l'Art is a French company which regularly publishes art history books and most particularly catalogues.

== Members ==
President : Pierre Rosenberg of the Académie française, président-directeur honoraire du Musée du Louvre.

- Direction : Christian Volle, Nicolas Lesur.
- Scientific committee :

Colin B. Bailey (Director, Fine Arts Museums, San Francisco), Marco Chiarini (Former Director of the Galleria Palatina, Palazzo Pitti, Florence), Keith Christiansen (Curator of the European painting, The Metropolitan Museum of Art, New York), Thomas W. Gaehtgens (Director, Getty Research Institute, Los Angeles), Michel Laclotte (président-directeur honoraire, Musée du Louvre, Paris), Alastair Laing (Curator Emeritus of Pictures & Sculptures, The National Trust, London), Anna Ottani Cavina (Professore di Storia dell'Arte, Università di Bologna. Direttore, Fondazione Federico Zeri), Nicholas Penny (Director, The National Gallery, London).

(Former): Sir Anthony Blunt, André Chastel, Francis Haskell, Robert Herbert, Michel Laclotte, Robert Rosenblum, Federico Zeri.

- Directors of Publication :

Claire Barbillon (université Paris Ouest Nanterre La Défense), Olivier Bonfait (université de Bourgogne), Jean-Pierre Cuzin, Bruno Foucart, Jacques Foucart, Christine Gouzi (université Paris-Sorbonne), Christophe Leribault (Petit Palais - musée des Beaux-Arts de la Ville de Paris), Stéphane Loire (musée du Louvre), Alain Mérot (université Paris-Sorbonne), Patrick Michel (université Lille 3 - Charles de Gaulle), Xavier Salmon (musée du Louvre), Guilhem Scherf (musée du Louvre), Philippe Sénéchal (université de Picardie - Jules Verne; Institut national d'histoire de l'art).

(Former): Jacques Foucart, Marianne Roland-Michel, Pierre Rosenberg, Antoine Schnapper, Alain Mérot.

- Previous Presidents : Alain Willk† (1977-1979), Alain Leclair (1979-1985), Pierre Vozlinsky† (1985-1994), Nicole Willk-Brocard (1994-2000) président d'honneur, Antoine Schnapper† (2000-2004).

== List of publications ==
By date of publication

- François-Guillaume Ménageot (1744-1816), Peintre d'histoire, directeur de l'Académie de France à Rome, par Nicole Willk-Brocard, 1978, OCLC 4733906. (out of print)
- La Peinture d'histoire en France de 1747 à 1785, par Jean Locquin, 1978, OCLC 4445657. (out of print)
- Jean-Simon Berthélemy, 1743-1811, par Nathalie Volle, 1979, OCLC 6864902. (out of print)
- Souvenirs d'un directeur des Beaux-Arts, par Philippe de Chennevières, 1979, OCLC 8532196.
- Les peintures de l'Opéra de Paris de Baudry à Chagall, 1980, OCLC 7193250.
- La Peinture Troubadour, deux artistes lyonnais, Pierre Révoil, 1776-1842, Fleury-Richard, 1777-1852, par Marie-Claude Chaudonneret, 1980. OCLC 7348060. (out of print)
- Nicolas Bertin (1668-1736), par Thierry Lefrançois, 1981, OCLC 8241047. (out of print)
- Robert Le Lorrain (1666-1743), par Michèle Beaulieu, 1982, ISBN 2-903239-01-0.
- Pierre Peyron (1744-1814), par Pierre Rosenberg et Udolpho van de Sandt, 1983, ISBN 2-903239-02-9.
- Lajoüe et l'Art Rocaille, par Marianne Roland Michel, 1984, ISBN 2-903239-03-7.
- François Le Moyne and his generation (1688-1737), par Jean-Luc Bordeaux, 1985, ISBN 2-903239-04-5. (out of print)
- Jacques Réattu (1760-1833), Peintre de la Révolution française, par Katrin Simons, 1985, ISBN 2-903239-05-3.
- Gaspard Dughet (1615-1675), par Marie-Nicole Boisclair, 1986, ISBN 2-903239-06-1. (out of print)
- Le renouveau de la peinture religieuse en France 1800-1860, par Bruno Foucart, 1987, ISBN 2-903239-07-X. (out of print)
- Eustache Le Sueur (1616-1655), par Alain Mérot, 1987, ISBN 2-903239-08-8. (out of print)
- Joseph-Marie Vien (1716-1809), par Thomas W. Gaehtgens et Jacques Lugand, 1988, ISBN 2-903239-09-6.
- Antoine Coypel (1661-1722), par Nicole Garnier, 1989, ISBN 2-903239-10-X. (out of print)
- Thomas Blanchet (1614-1689), par Lucie Galactéros-de Boissier, 1991, ISBN 2-903239-11-8.
- Les Frères Goncourt, Collectionneurs de dessins, par Élisabeth Launay, 1991, ISBN 2-903239-12-6.
- Gérard de Lairesse (1640-1711), par Alain Roy, 1992, ISBN 2-903239-13-4.
- Giuseppe Cades (1750-1799), et la Rome de son temps, par Maria Teresa Caracciolo, 1992, ISBN 2-903239-14-2.
- L’Atelier d’Ingres, par Amaury-Duval, présentation par Daniel Ternois, 1993, ISBN 2-903239-15-0.
- Claude Vignon (1593-1670), par Paola Pacht Bassani, 1993,ISBN 2-903239-16-9. (out of print)
- Philippe-Auguste Hennequin (1762-1833), par Jérémie Benoit, 1994, ISBN 2-903239-17-7.
- Charles Coypel (1694 - 1752), par Thierry Lefrançois, 1994, ISBN 2-903239-18-5.
- Une dynastie : les Hallé, (Daniel Hallé, Claude Guy Hallé, Noël Hallé), par Nicole Willk-Brocard, 1995, ISBN 2-903239-19-3.
- Alexandre-Joseph Paillet, Expert et marchand de tableaux, par JoLynn Edwards, 1996, ISBN 2-903239-20-7.
- Corneille de La Haye dit Corneille de Lyon (1500/1515-1575), par Anne Dubois de Groër, 1997, ISBN 2-903239-21-5.
- Charles Poerson (1609-1667), par Barbara Brejon de Lavergnée, Nicole de Reyniès, Nicolas Sainte Fare Garnot, 1997, ISBN 2-903239-22-3.
- Les Watteau de Lille, Louis Watteau (1731-1798), François Watteau (1758-1823), par Gaëtane Maës, 1998, ISBN 2-903239-23-1.
- Laurent Delvaux (1696-1778), par Alain Jacobs, 1999, ISBN 2-903239-24-X.
- Napoléon : portraits contemporains, par Gérard Hubert et Guy Ledoux-Lebard, 1999, ISBN 2-903239-25-8.
- Eustache Le Sueur (1616-1655), par Alain Mérot, 2000, (réédition enrichie de celle de 1987), ISBN 2-903239-26-6.
- Jean Restout (1692-1768), peintre d'histoire à Paris, par Christine Gouzi, 2000, ISBN 2-903239-27-4.
- Les Patel, Pierre Patel (1605-1676) et ses fils, le paysage de ruines à Paris au XVIIe siècle, par Natalie Coural, 2001, ISBN 2-903239-28-2.
- Louis-Jacques Durameau (1733-1796), par Anne Leclair, 2001, ISBN 2-903239-29-0.
- Jean-François de Troy (1679 - 1752), par Christophe Leribault, 2002, ISBN 2-903239-30-4. Prix du Syndicat National des Antiquaires pour le Livre d'Art.
- Nicolas-Antoine Taunay (1755 - 1830), par Claudine Lebrun Jouve, 2003, ISBN 2-903239-36-3.
- Noël-Nicolas Coypel (1690-1734), par Jérôme Delaplanche, 2004, ISBN 2-903239-31-2.
- François du Quesnoy (1597 - 1643), par Marion Boudon-Machuel, 2005, ISBN 2-903239-32-0. Prix du Syndicat National des Antiquaires pour le Livre d'Art.
- Louis Bréa (ca.1450- ca.1523), par Claire-Lise Schwok, 2005, ISBN 2-903239-33-9. (out of print)
- Daniel Dumonstier (1574-1646), par Daniel Lecœur, 2006, ISBN 2-903239-34-7.
- Joseph Parrocel (1646-1704). La nostalgie de l'héroïsme, par Jérôme Delaplanche, 2006, ISBN 2-903239-35-5.
- Nicolas Régnier, (ca.1588-1667), par Annick Lemoine, 2007, ISBN 978-2-903239-37-4. Prix du Syndicat National des Antiquaires pour le Livre d'Art.
- Giovanni Francesco Rustici (1475-1554), par Philippe Sénéchal, 2007, ISBN 978-2-903239-38-1.
- Charles Meynier (1763-1832), par Isabelle Mayer-Michalon, 2008, ISBN 978-2-903239-39-8.
- Jean-Baptiste Deshays (1729-1765), par André Bancel, 2008, ISBN 978-2-903239-40-4.
- Jean-Baptiste Marie Pierre (1714-1789) Premier peintre du roi, par Nicolas Lesur et Olivier Aaron, 2009, ISBN 978-2-903239-41-1.
- Jean Jouvenet (1644-1717) et la peinture d'histoire à Paris, par Antoine Schnapper, nouvelle édition complétée par Christine Gouzi, 2010 ISBN 978-2-903239-42-8.
- Pierre Jacques Volaire (1729 - 1799) dit le chevalier Volaire, par Emilie Beck Saiello, 2010, ISBN 978-2-903239-41-1.
- Jacob van Loo (1614-1670), par David Mandrella, 2011, ISBN 978-2-903239-44-2.
- Portraits dessinés de la Cour des Valois - Les Clouet de Catherine de Médicis, par Alexandra Zvereva, 2011, ISBN 978-2-903239-45-9.
- La Chapelle royale de Versailles - Le dernier grand chantier de Louis XIV, par Alexandre Maral, 2011, ISBN 978-2-903239-46-6.
- Robert Nanteuil (1623-1678), par Audrey Adamczak, 2011, ISBN 978-2-903239-47-3.
- Charles-Joseph Natoire (1700-1777), par Susanna Caviglia-Brunel, 2012, ISBN 978-2-903239-48-0.
- Philippe-Jacques de Loutherbourg (1740-1812), par Olivier Lefeuvre, 2012, ISBN 978-2-903239-49-7.
- Charles-Joseph Natoire (1700-1777), par Susanna Caviglia-Brunel, 2012, (ISBN 978-2-903239-48-0).
- Philippe-Jacques de Loutherbourg (1740-1812), par Olivier Lefeuvre, 2012, (ISBN 978-2-903239-49-7).
- Charles Errard (ca. 1601-1689) - La noblesse du décor, par Emmanuel Coquery, 2013, (ISBN 978-2-903239-50-3).
- François-André Vincent (1746-1816) - entre Fragonard et David, par Jean-Pierre Cuzin, 2013, (ISBN 978-2-903239-51-0).
- La Peinture d'histoire en France (1860-1900), par Pierre Sérié, 2014, (ISBN 978-2-903239-52-7).
- Jean-Baptiste Perronneau (1715-1783), par Dominique d'Arnoult, 2014, (ISBN 978-2-903239-54-1).
- Bertholet Flémal (1614-1675), par Pierre-Yves Kairis, 2015, (ISBN 9782903239565).
- Francois Girardon Le Sculpteur de Louis XIV par Alexandre Maral, 2016
- Albert Bartholomé (à parâitre 2016)
- La dynastie Barbedienne (à parâitre 2016)
- Jean-Bernard Restout (à parâitre 2016)
- François Le Moyne and his generation, 1688-1737, by Jean-Luc Bordeaux, 1985, ISBN 2-903239-04-5. - the house's only work in English

== Reviews and reception ==
- (27 August 2004), Noël-Nicolas Coypel 1690-1734 : Before speaking on the latest Arthéna book
- (25 September 2005), Photographies interdites : End of the penultimate paragraph.
- (30 July 2006), François du Quesnoy (1597-1643 : Review of this work
- (17 September 2006), A l'occasion d'une exposition organisée par le Musée Condé de Chantilly, les éditions Arthéna ont publié : The Art Tribune
- Pour l’histoire de l’art en France article d'Olivier Bonfait, Science advisor to the INHA: "In art history one cannot privilege the monograph view, but we must recognise that the quality of Arthena éditions and their editing of classic monographs of artists is not found anywhere else."
