= Claude-Guy Hallé =

French painter (1652–1736)

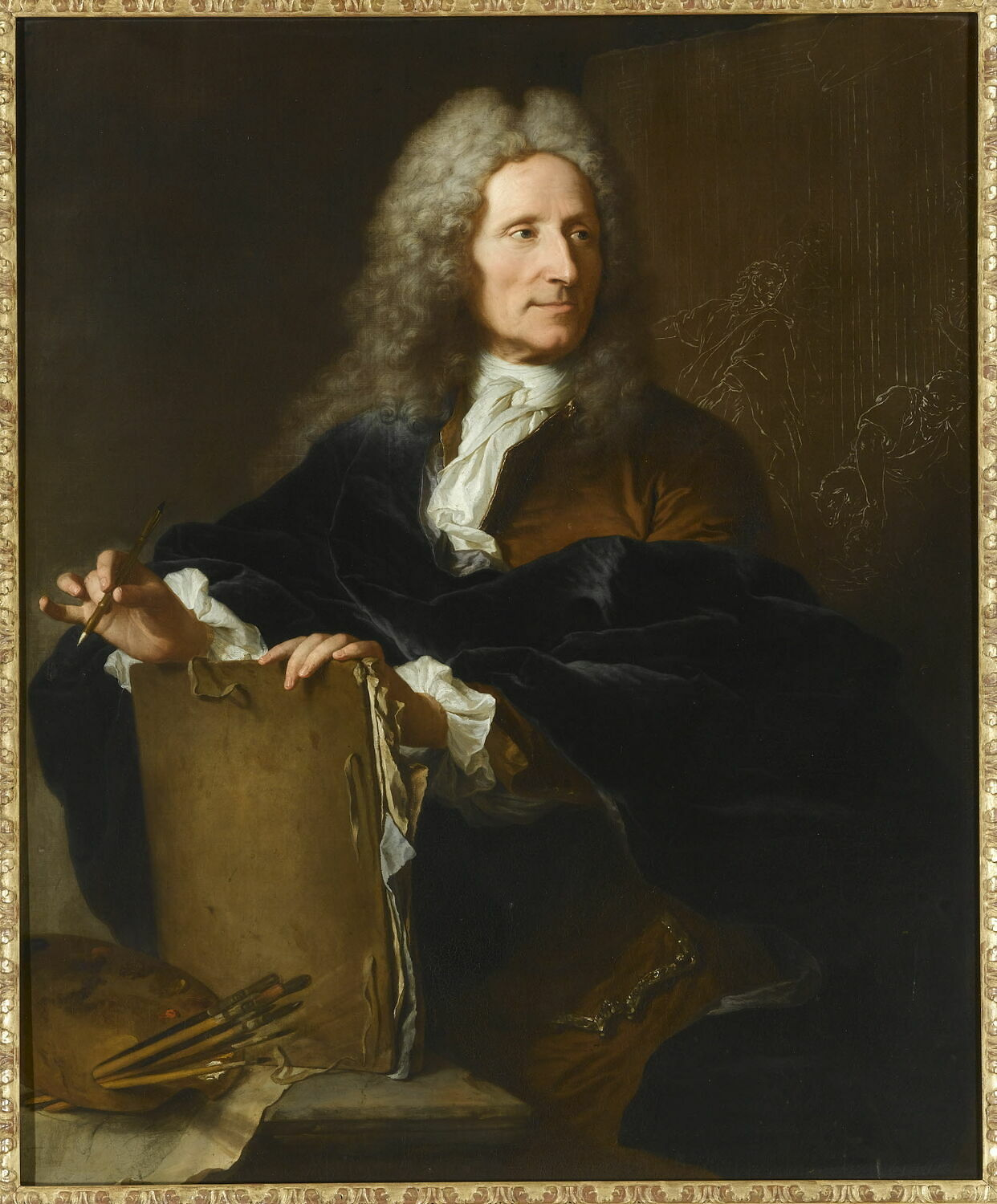
- Portrait of Hallé from 1725 by Académie member Jean Le Gros
- Born: 14 January 1652; Paris, Kingdom of France
- Died: 5 November 1736 (aged 84); Paris, Kingdom of France
- Known for: Painting
- Notable work: Adam's Transgression; The Restoration of the Catholic Religion in Strasbourg
- Children: Noël Hallé; Marie-Anne Hallé
- Parents: Daniel Hallé (father); Catherine Coquelet (mother)
- Awards: Prix de Rome (1675)

Director of the Académie de Peinture et de Sculpture
- In office 1733–1735 (Note: The directorship of the Académie was shared until February 1735 between Hallé and the three other rectors: Hyacinthe Rigaud, Nicolas de Largillière, and Guillaume Coustou)
- Monarch: Louis XV
- Preceded by: Louis de Boullogne
- Succeeded by: Guillaume Coustou

Claude-Guy Hallé (French pronunciation: [klod ɡi ale]; 14 January 1652, Paris – 5 November 1736, Paris) was a French painter, draughtsman, and illustrator.

== Biography ==
Hallé was born in Paris on 14 January 1652 to Daniel Hallé, a painter from Rouen, and Catherine Coquelet. In 1675, he won the Prix de Rome with Adam's Transgression. In 1699, Hallé joined the Académie royale de peinture et de sculpture with his painting The Restoration of the Catholic Religion in Strasbourg.

Hallé was elected a professeur of the Académie in 1702 and then a recteur in 1733. Following the death of directeur Louis de Boullogne on 28 November 1733, the painter Hyacinthe Rigaud proposed that the four rectors of the Académie, Hallé, Nicolas de Largillière, Guillaume Coustou, and himself, rotate the post. This oligarchy would persist until the election of Coustou as sole director on 5 February 1735.

His son was the painter Noël Hallé and his daughter, Marie-Anne Hallé, married the painter Jean Restout the Younger. Hallé died in Paris on 5 November 1736.

== Works ==
- Adam's Transgression (1675), now lost
- Jeux d'enfants : le saut du chien, French embassy in Germany
- Presentation in the Temple, Rouen; Musée des beaux-arts
- Adoration of the Mahgi, Musée d’Orléans
- The Annunciation, Musée du Louvre
- Reparation by the doge of Genoa to Louis XIV, 15 May 1685, Musée de Marseille
- Simon Hurtrelle (1648-1724), Musée de Versailles

== Gallery ==
Works by Hallé

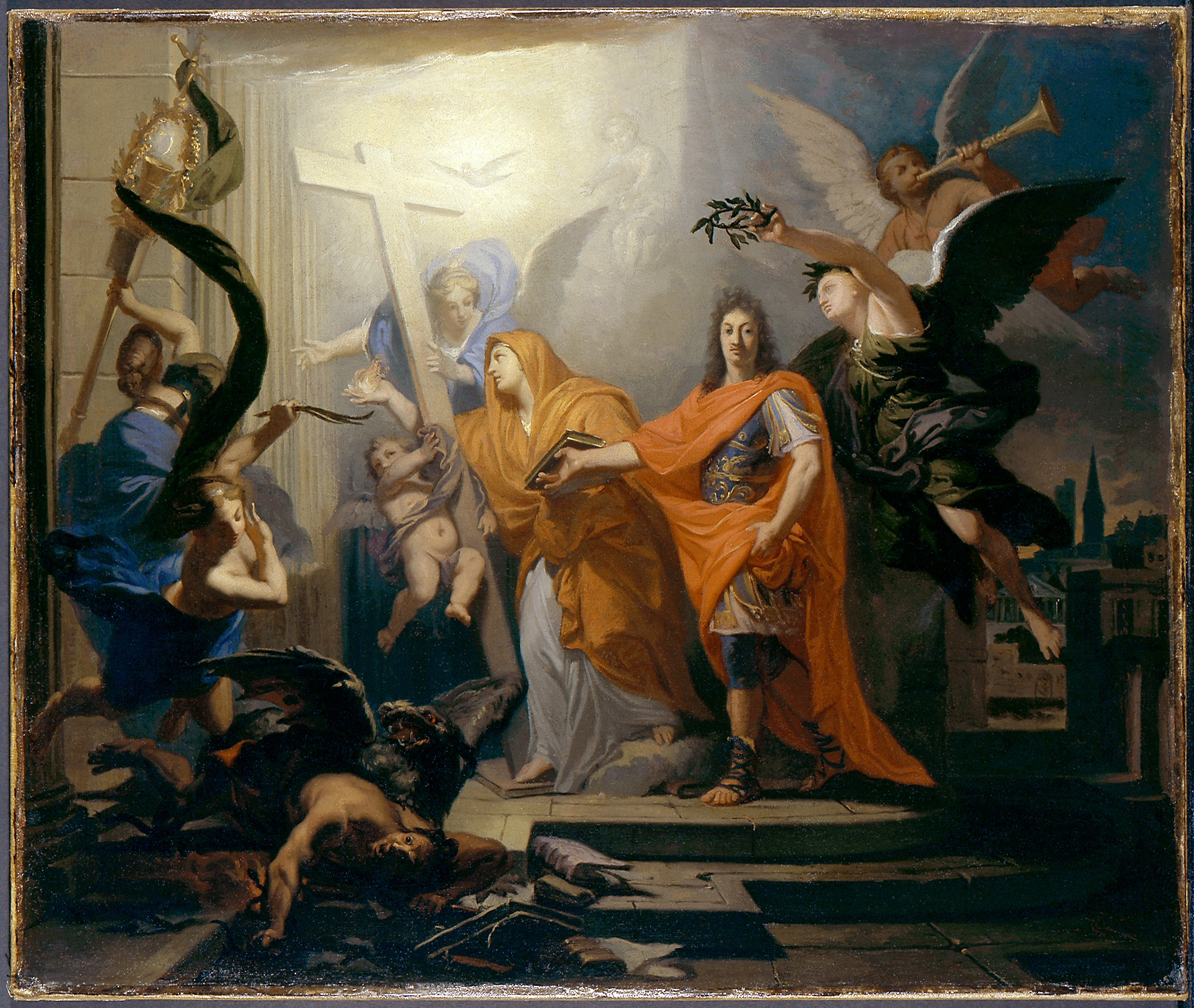
The Restoration of the Catholic Religion in Strasbourg (1699)

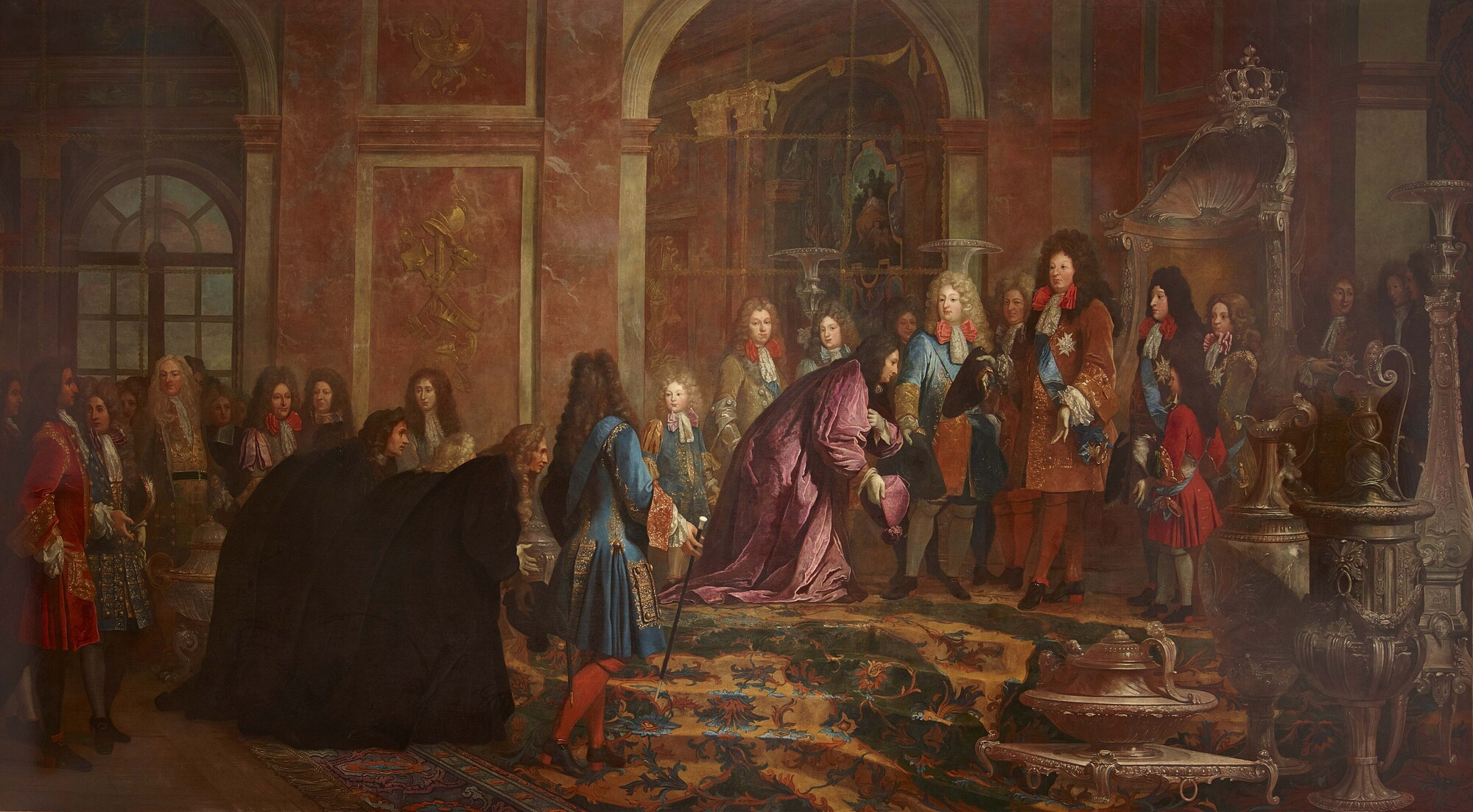
Reparations made to Louis XIV by the Doge of Genoa in the Hall of Mirrors of Versailles on 15 May 1685 (1715)
