= Daniel Dumonstier =

French artist (1574–1646)

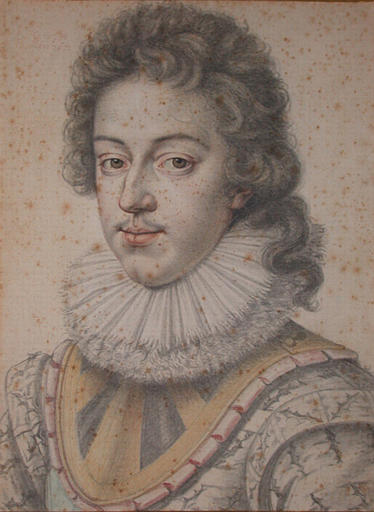
Louis XIII (1617), by Dumonstier

Daniel Dumonstier (14 May 1574 – 22 June 1646) was a French artist, nicknamed as the best artist in crayons in Europe of his time but now little known. His father Cosme Dumonstier (Daniel was born illegitimate but was later legitimised), his uncle Pierre Dumonstier I and his cousin Pierre Dumonstier II were all also artists. He drew portraits of the major figures of 17th century France, but it is unknown if he limited himself to drawing or also painted.

An exhibition of all the 30 works by him held at Chantilly and important pieces from the Bibliothèque nationale de France and the Louvre was organised at musée Condé at Chantilly from 15 March 2006 to 15 June 2006 when Editions Arthéna published a thesis by Daniel Lecoeur on him.
