= Étienne Dumonstier =

French painter (1540–1603)

Étienne Dumonstier, also Nicholas Denizot, (1540–1603) was a French Renaissance portrait painter.

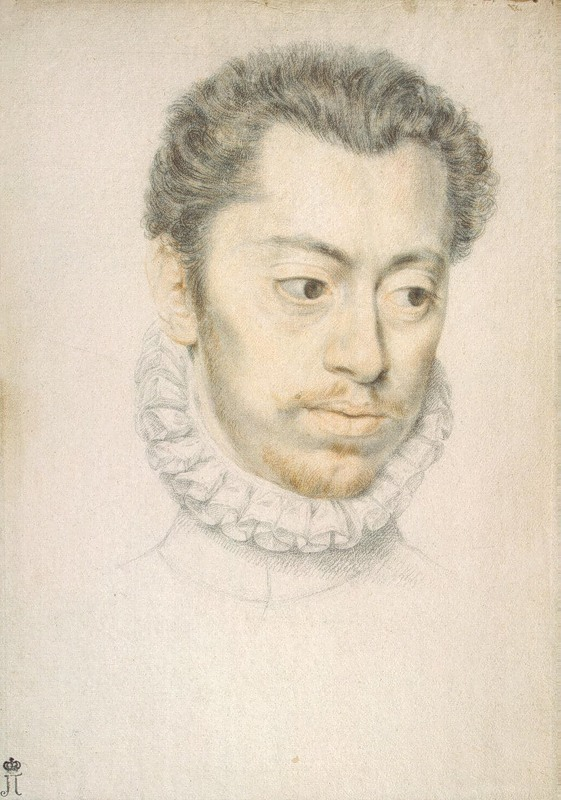
Portrait of Étienne Dumonstier by Pierre Dumonstier I

Not much is known about Dumonstier's life except through his works. He primarily painted portraits for the French Royal family. His style indicates that he was part of the workshop of François Clouet, which also included François Quesnel. He was patronized by Catherine de' Medici, and may have been close to her, since he was requested to carry out a diplomatic mission for her to Vienna around 1570. Dumonstier also painted for Henry II of France, other members of the House of Valois, and Henry IV of France. Only a few works have been attributed to him, but definitive attributions have been difficult due to the similarities between the artists of Clouet's workshop. One painting executed by Dumonstier A Lady in White is part of the National Trust for Places of Historic Interest or Natural Beauty collection.

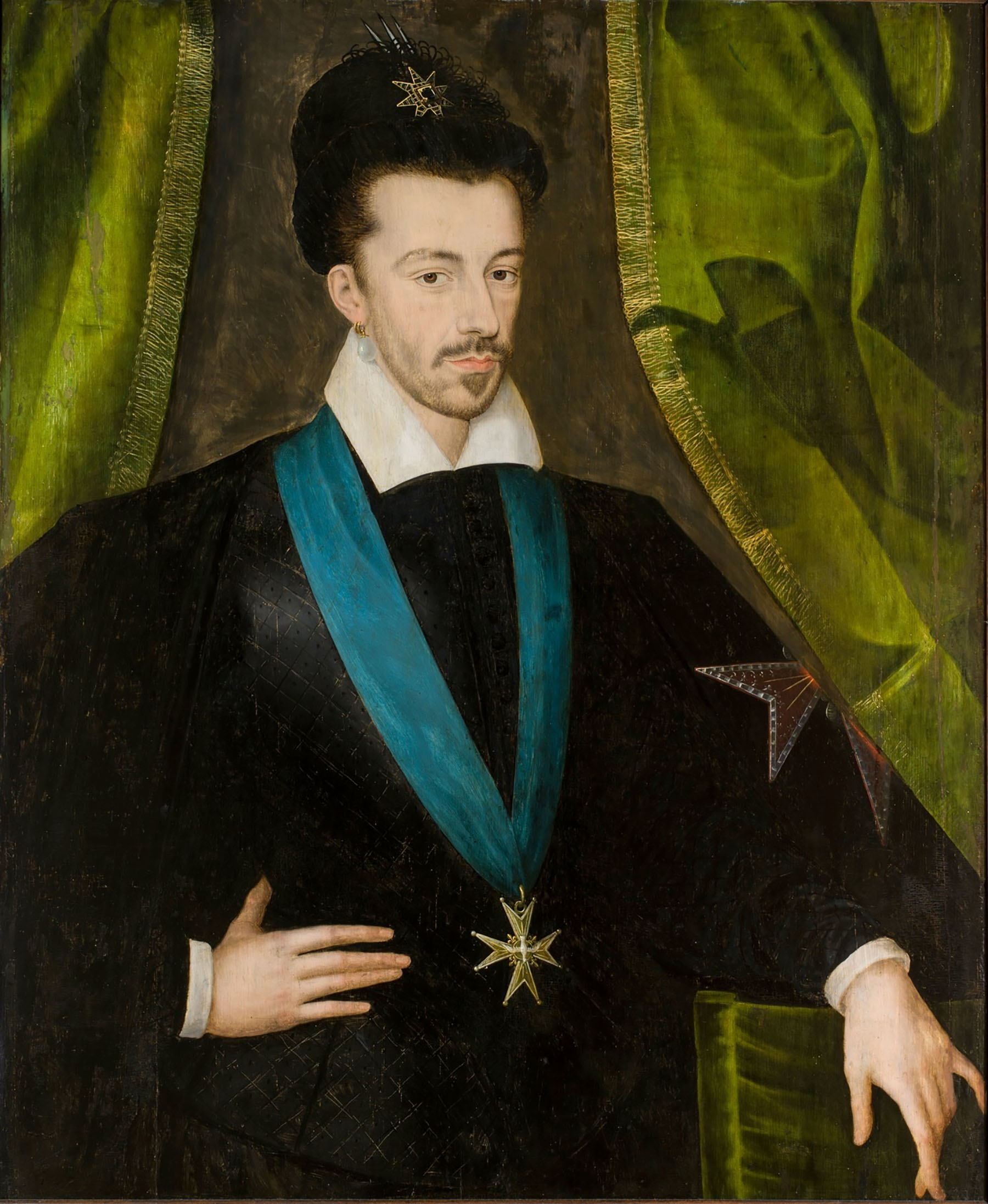
Henry III of France, 1578

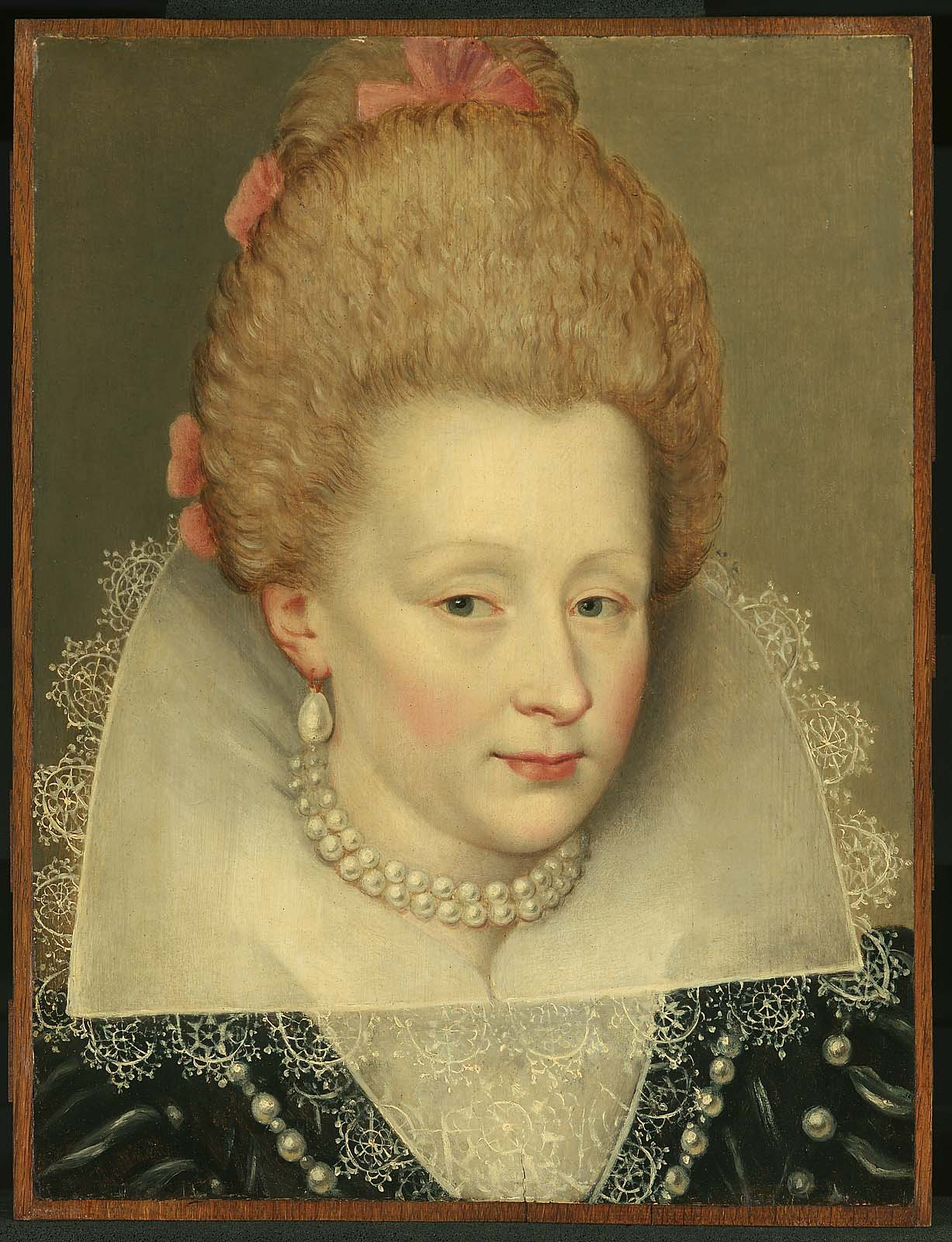
Portrait of a Woman
