= Eustache Le Sueur =

French artist and one of the founders of the French Academy of Painting (1617–1655)

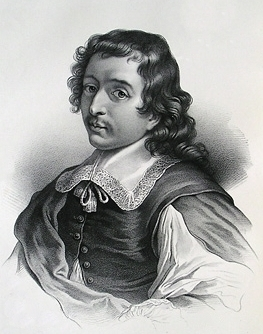
Eustache Le Sueur

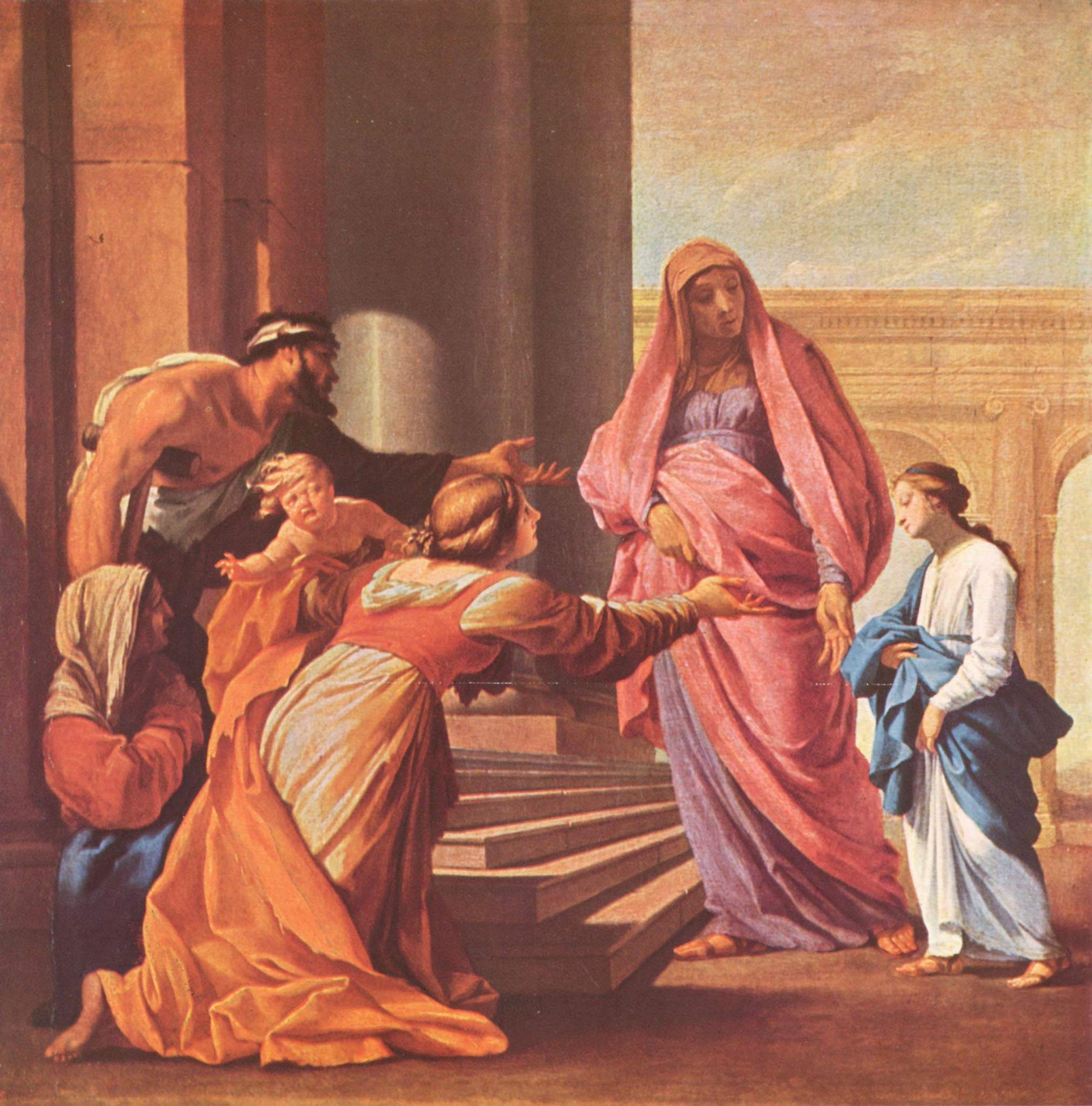
Presentation of the Virgin in the Temple, c. 1640–1645, Hermitage Museum, St. Petersburg

Eustache Le Sueur or Lesueur (French pronunciation: [østaʃ lə sɥœʁ]; 19 November 1617 – 30 April 1655) was a French artist and one of the founders of the French Academy of Painting. He is known primarily for his paintings of religious subjects. He was a leading exponent of the neoclassical style of Parisian Atticism.

== Training and career ==
He was born in Paris, where he spent his entire life. His father, Cathelin Le Sueur, a turner and sculptor in wood, placed him with Vouet, in whose studio he rapidly distinguished himself.

Admitted at an early age into the guild of master-painters, he left them to take part in establishing the French Royal Academy of Painting and Sculpture in 1648 and was elected as one of the original twelve elders in charge of its administration.

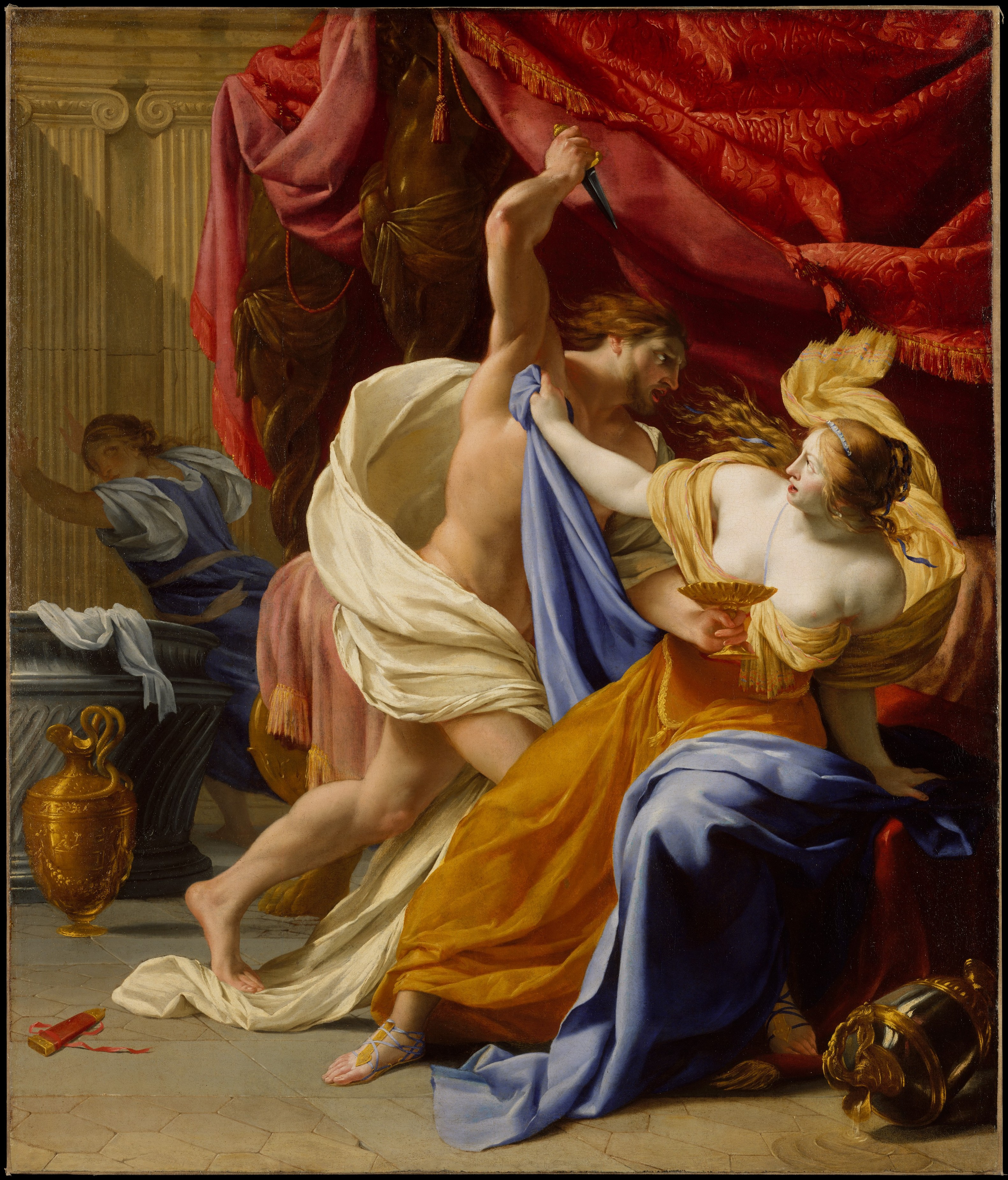
Rape of Tamar, c. 1640 (Note: This image may be instead an image of Tarquin and Lucretia (which see); the slave in the image is female but male in the Lucretia legend, but, on the other hand, the dagger is not a part of the Tamar legend.)

Some paintings, illustrative of the Hypnerotomachia Poliphili, which were reproduced in tapestry, brought him notice, and his reputation was further enhanced by a series of decorations (Louvre) in the mansion of Lambert de Thorigny, which he left uncompleted, for their execution was frequently interrupted by other commissions. Amongst these were several pictures for the apartments of the king and queen in the Louvre, which are now missing, although they were entered in Bailly's inventory (1710); but several works produced for minor patrons have come down to us.

In the gallery of the Louvre are the Angel and Hagar, from the mansion of De Tonnay Charente; Tobias and Tobit, from the Fieubet collection; several pictures executed for the church of Saint Gervais; the Martyrdom of St Lawrence, from Saint Germain de l'Auxerrois; two works from the destroyed abbey of Marmoutiers; St Paul preaching at Ephesus, painted for the goldsmiths corporation in 1649; and his series of the Life of St Bruno, executed in the cloister of the Chartreux. Le Sueur was also a prolific draftsman and many of his chalk drawings are in the Louvre's Cabinet des Dessins.

His pupils, who aided him much in his work, were his wife's brother, Theodore Goussé, and three brothers of his own, as well as Claude Lefèbvre and Pierre Patel the landscape painter. Most of his works have been engraved, chiefly by Picart, B. Audran, Leclerc, Drevet, Chauveau, Poilly and Desplaces.

== Style ==
According to the Encyclopædia Britannica Eleventh Edition, it was considered that Le Sueur's work lent itself readily to the engraver's art, as he had a delicate perception of varied shades of grave and elevated sentiment, and possessed the power to render them. His graceful facility in composition was always restrained by a very fine taste, but his works often fail to please completely, because, producing so much, he had too frequent recourse to conventional types, and partly because he rarely saw colour except with the cold and clayey quality proper to the school of Vouet; yet his St Paul at Ephesus and one or two other works show that he was not naturally deficient in this sense, and whenever we get direct reference to nature—as in the monks of the St Bruno series—we recognize his admirable power to read and render physiognomy of varied and serious type.

== Selected works ==
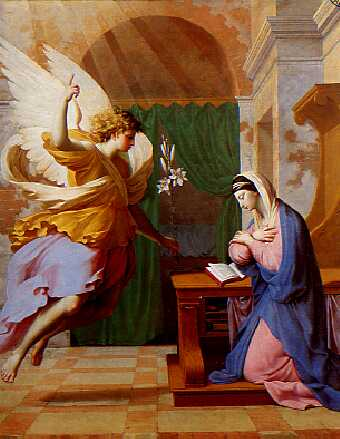
The Annunciation, (1650)

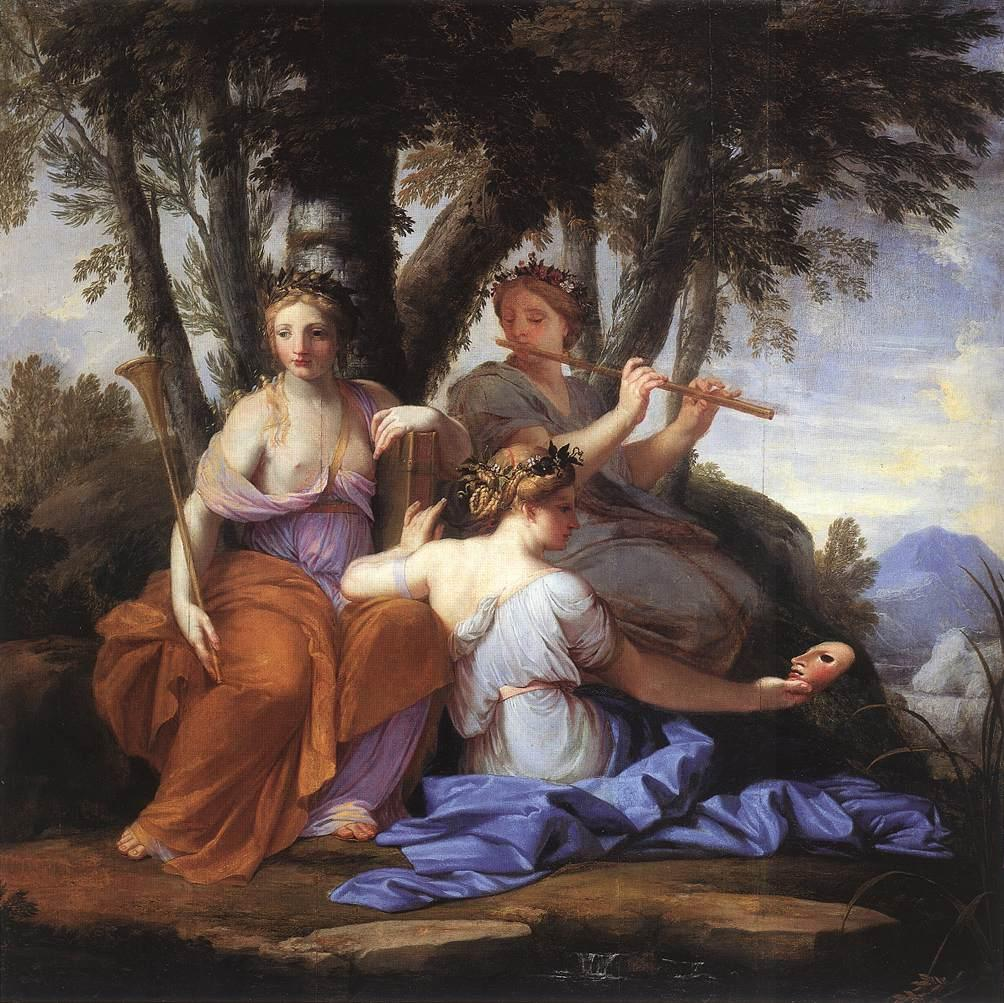
The Muses: Clio, Euterpe and Thalia (between 1652 and 1655), Louvre

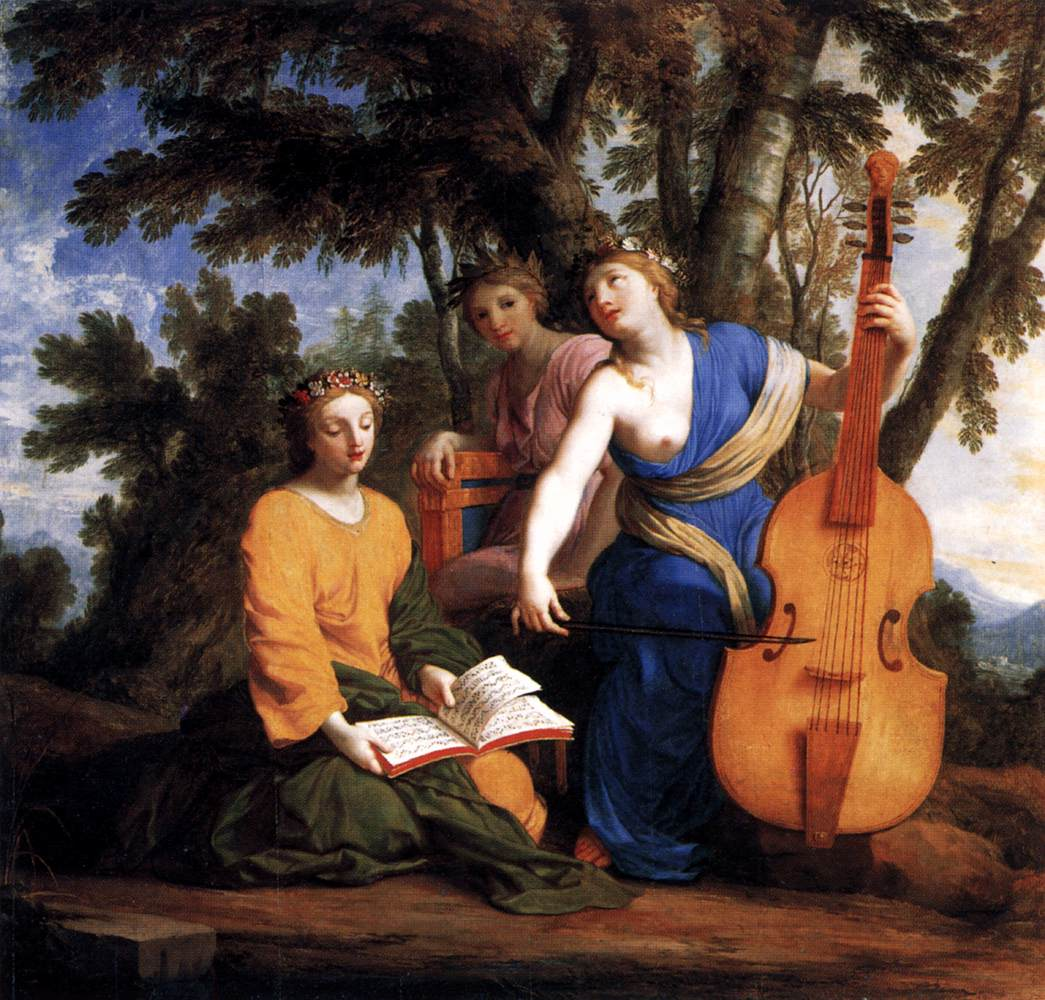
Melpomene, Erato and Polyhymnia (1650s), Louvre

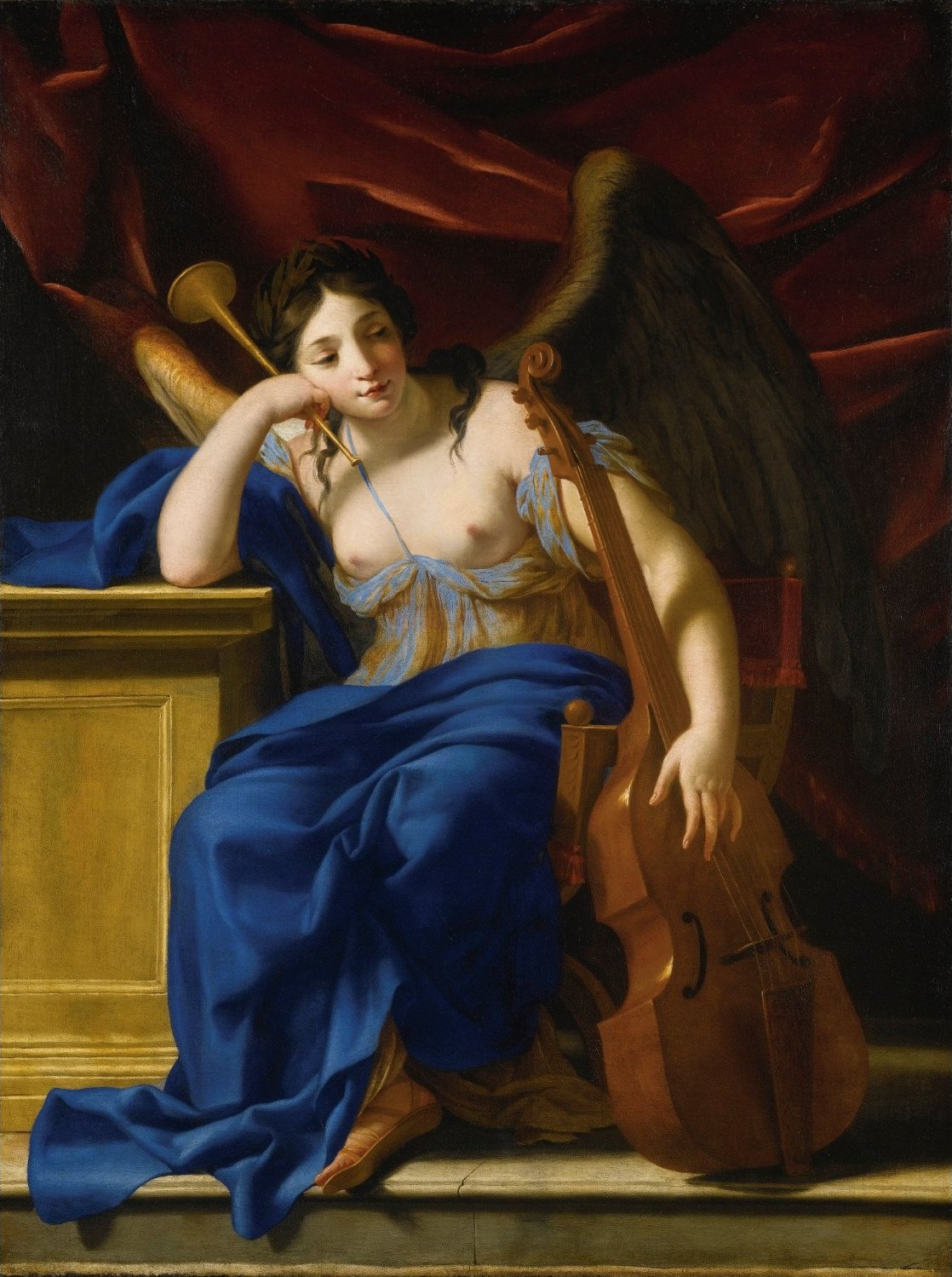
An Allegory of Poetry

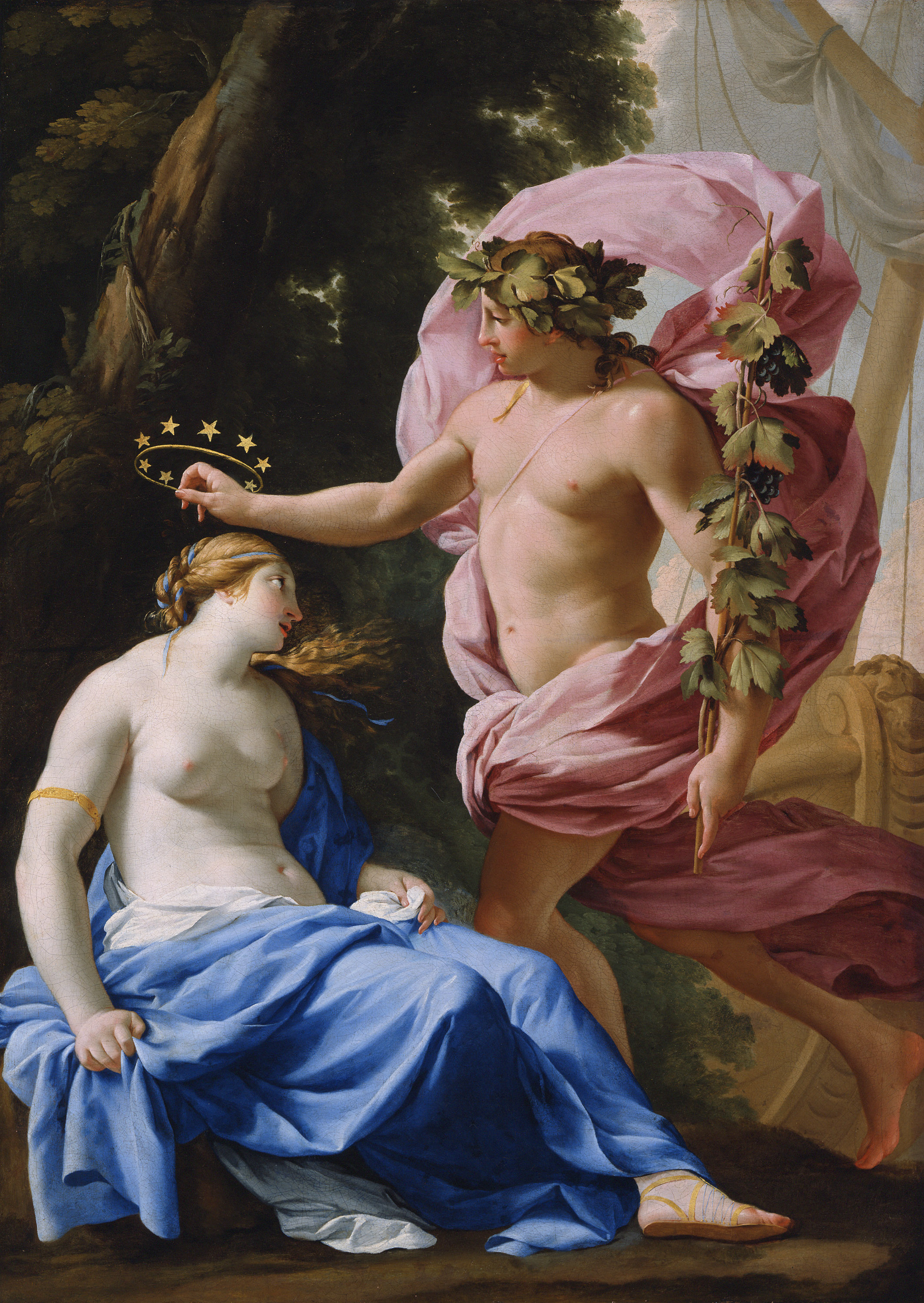
Bacchus and Ariadne (about 1640) Museum of Fine Arts, Boston (68.764)

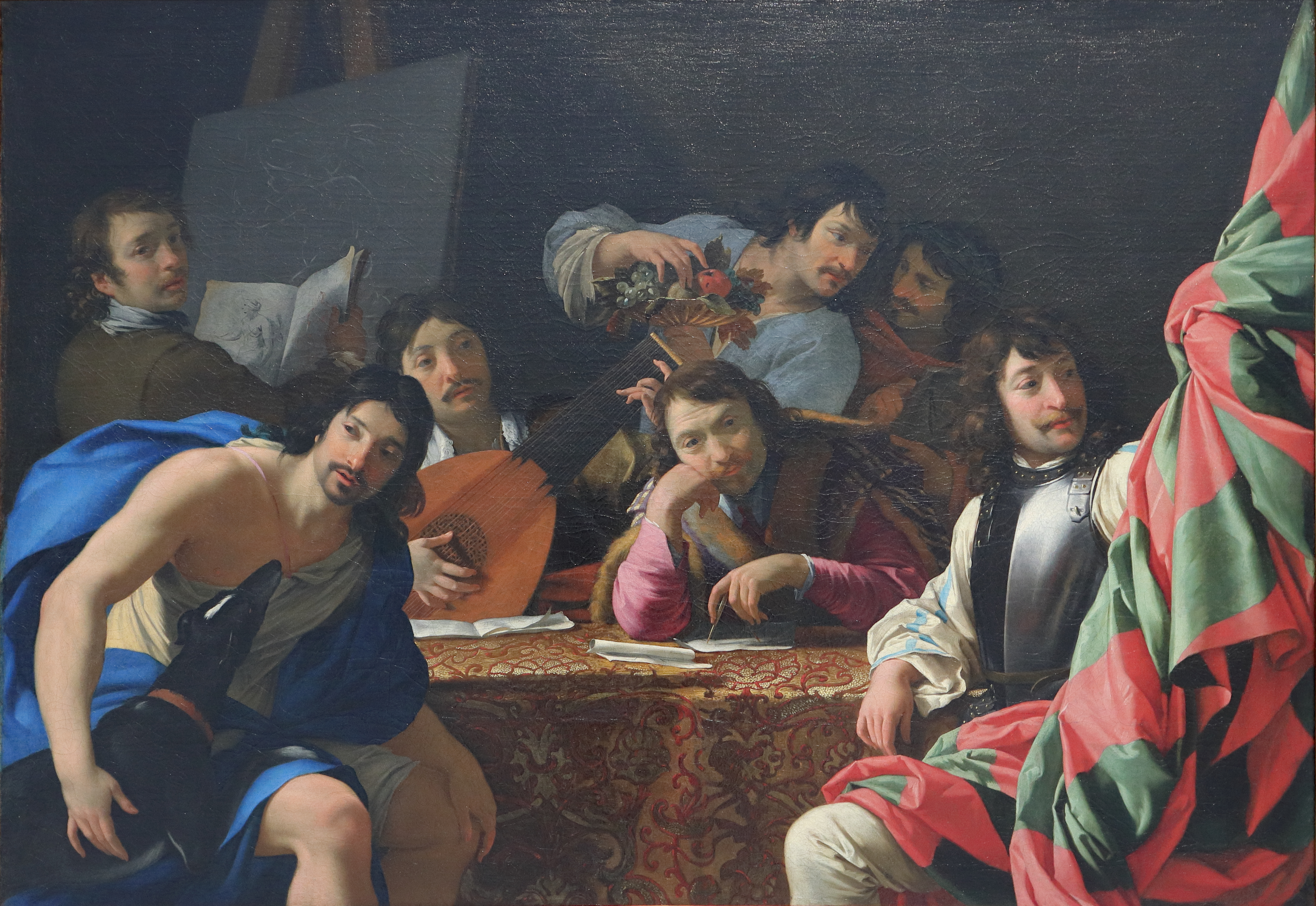
Meeting of friends, Louvre Museum (around 1640)

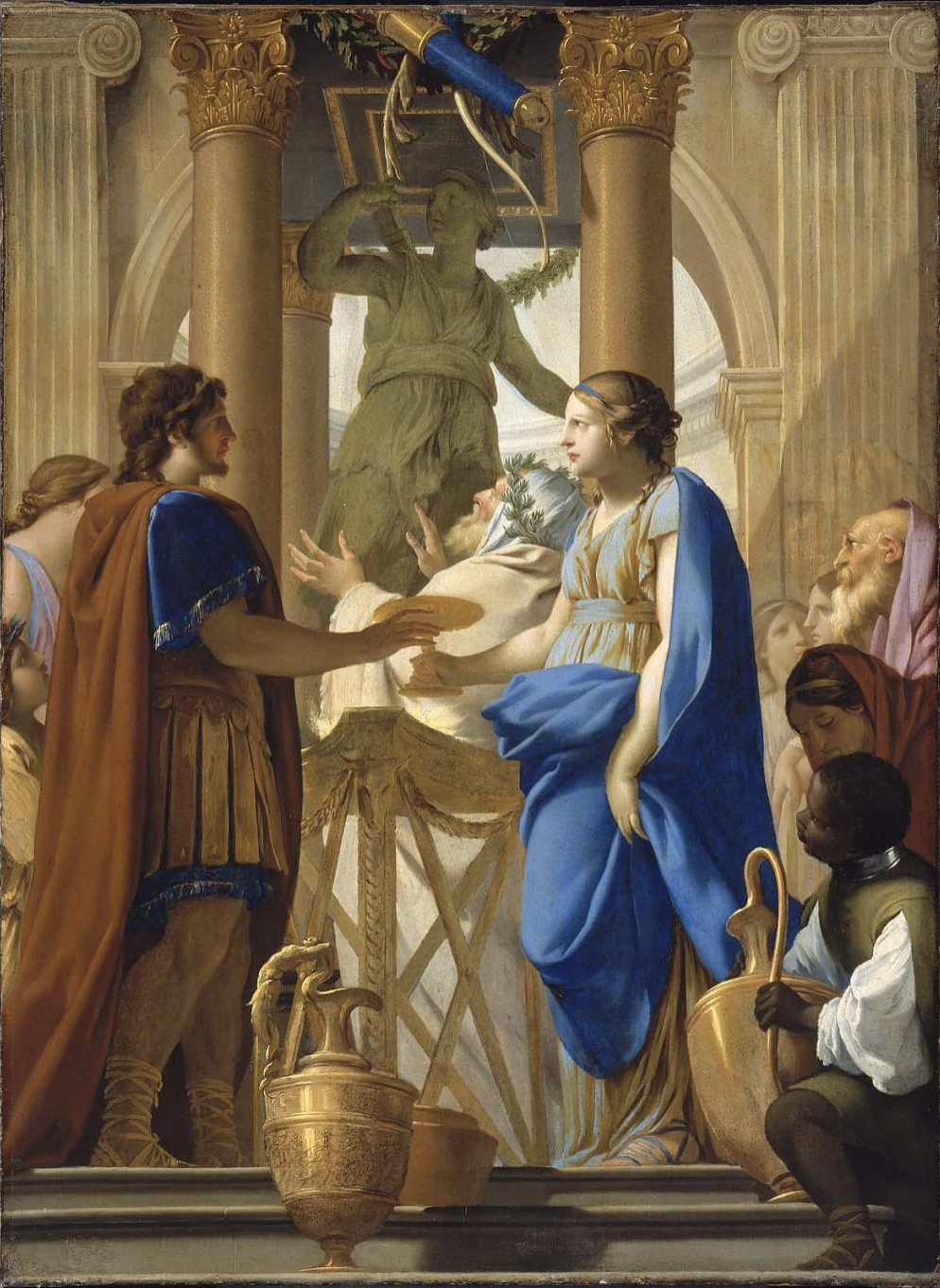
Camma Offers the Poisoned Wedding Cup to Synorix in the Temple of Diana (c. 1644), Museum of Fine Arts, Boston

The Triumph of Galatea (1643–1644), private collection

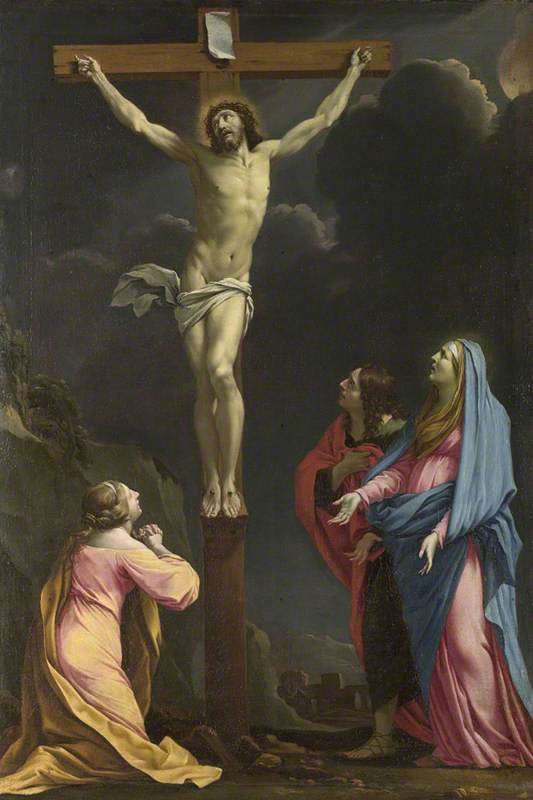
Christ on the Cross with the Magdalen, the Virgin Mary and Saint John the Evangelist (1643)

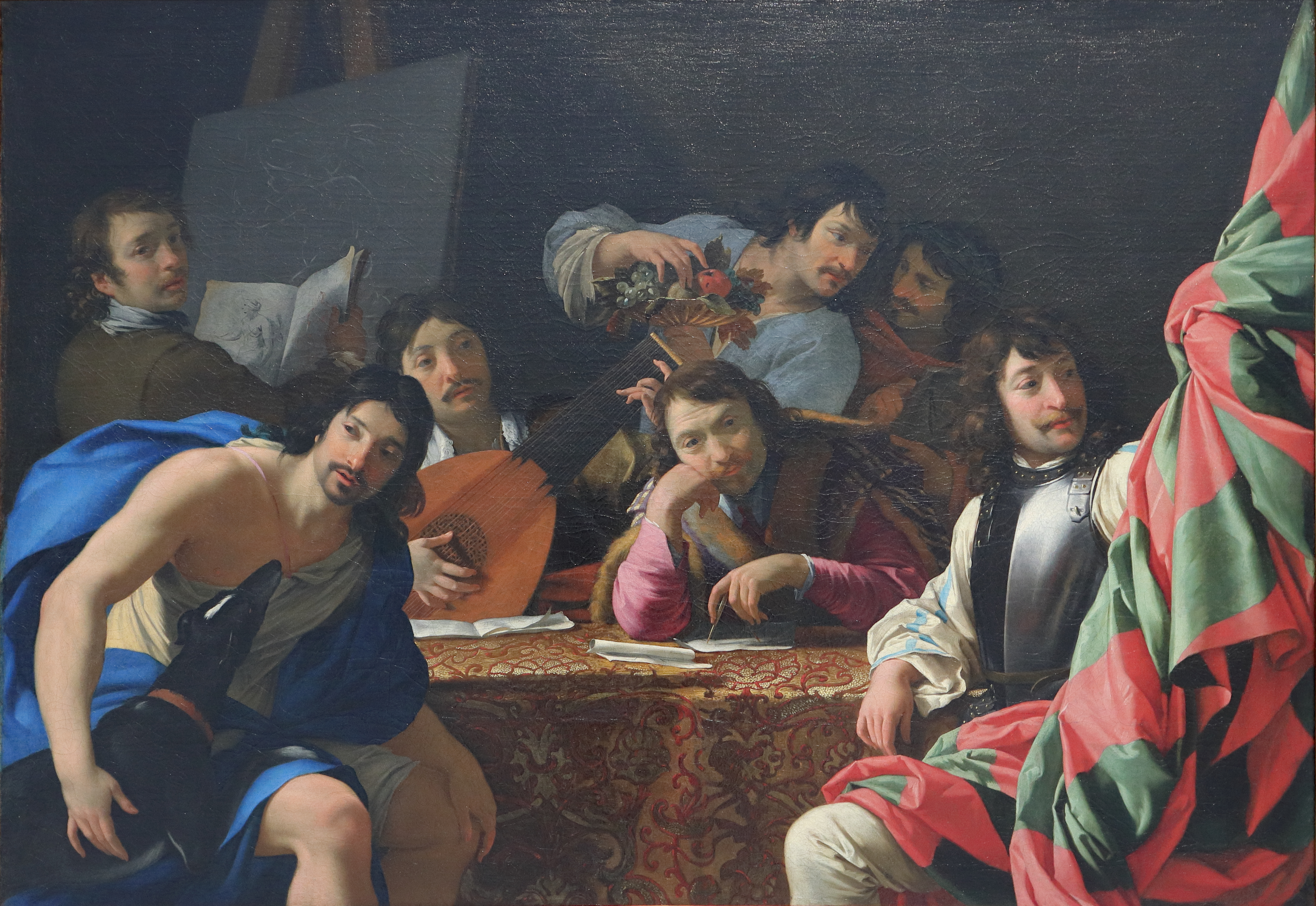
Meeting of friends, (around 1640), Paris, Louvre Museum.
