= Daniel Hallé =

French painter (1614–1675)

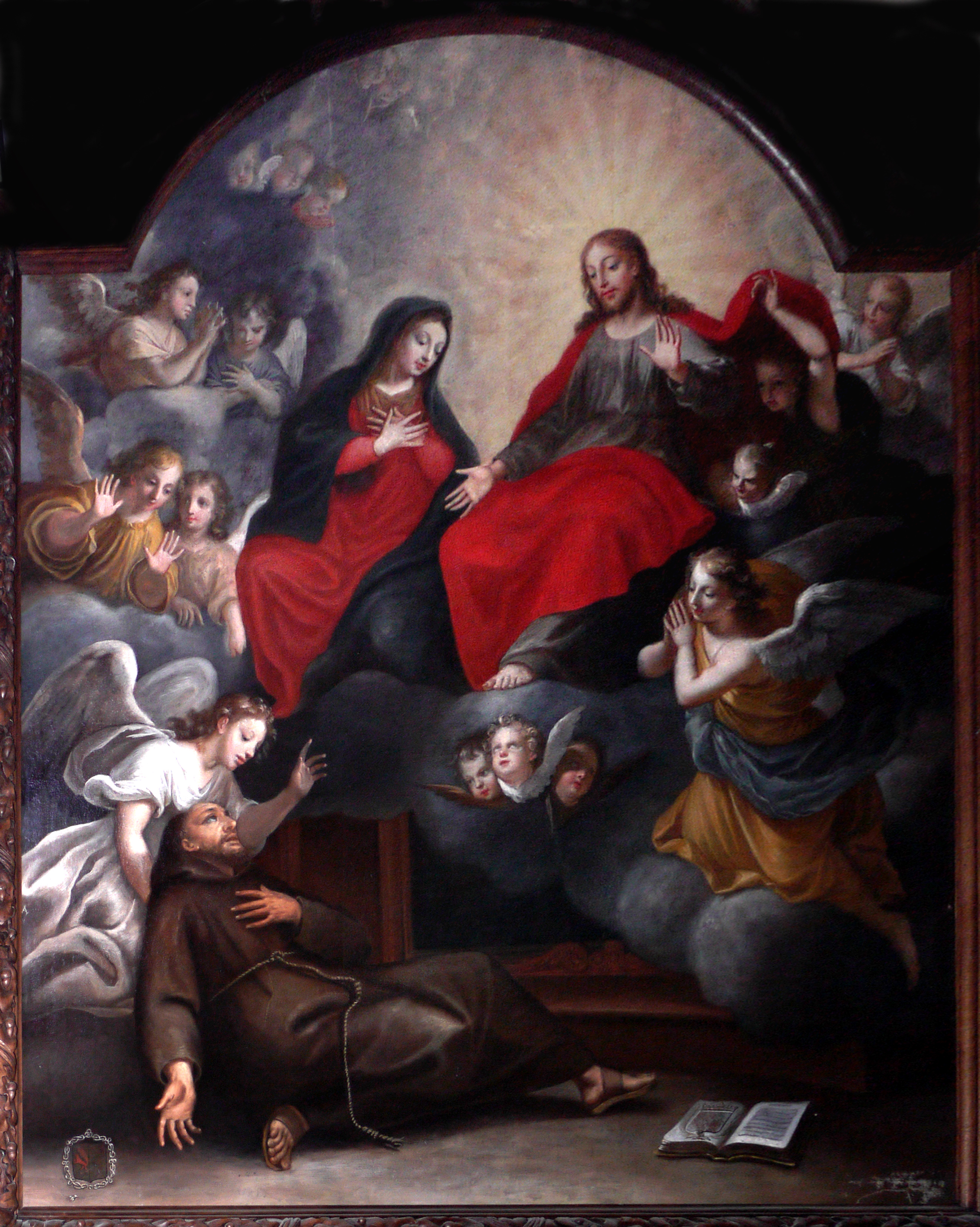
Daniel Hallé, Christ and the Virgin appearing to St Francis, 1671.

Daniel Hallé (French pronunciation: [danjɛl ale]; 27 September 1614, in Rouen – 14 July 1675, in Paris) was a French painter.

He studied painting in his birthplace and was apprenticed there on 4 November 1631. He produced a Multiplication of the Loaves (1665) and Martyrdom of Saint-Symphorien. He was the father of the painter Claude Guy Hallé and a grandfather of the painter Noël Hallé.

== Works ==
- Christ in the Tomb, musée Greuze, Tournus
- The Nativity, musée des beaux-arts de Rouen
