= Pierre Dumonstier II =

French artist

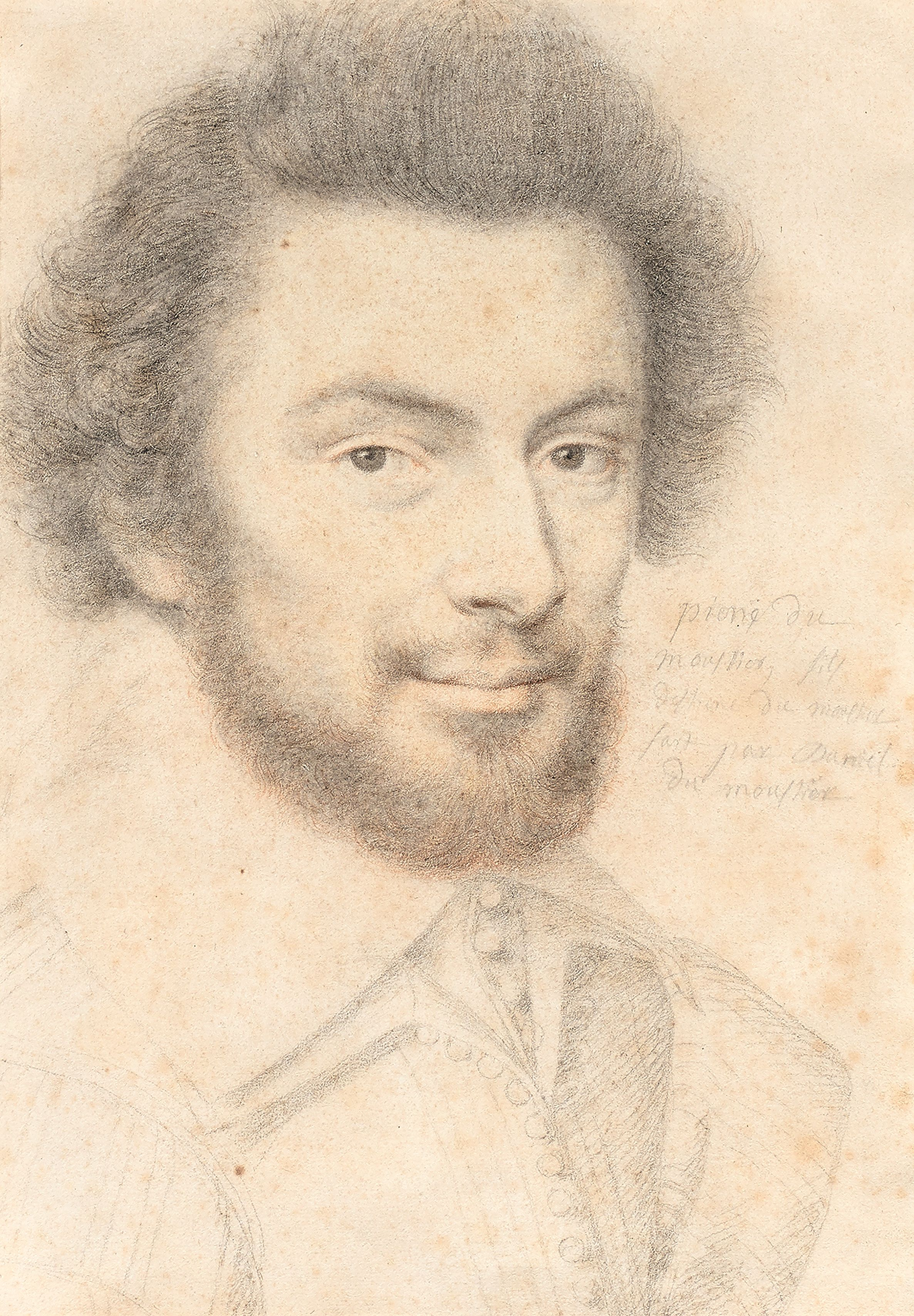
Portrait of Pierre Dumonstier II drawn by Daniel Dumonstier

Pierre Dumonstier II (1585–1656) was a French artist.

== Life ==
His family produced several artists. The son of Étienne Dumonstier, Pierre was sometimes known as 'le neveu' (the nephew). He was one of at least five family members who specialised in chalk portrait drawings. Only ten drawings by him were catalogued by Louis Damier in his Histoire de la peinture de portrait en France au XVIe siècle. One of these is a 1625 drawing of the hand of Artemisia Gentileschi, probably made just after Dumonstier's arrival in Rome.
