= Pierre Dumonstier I =

French artist

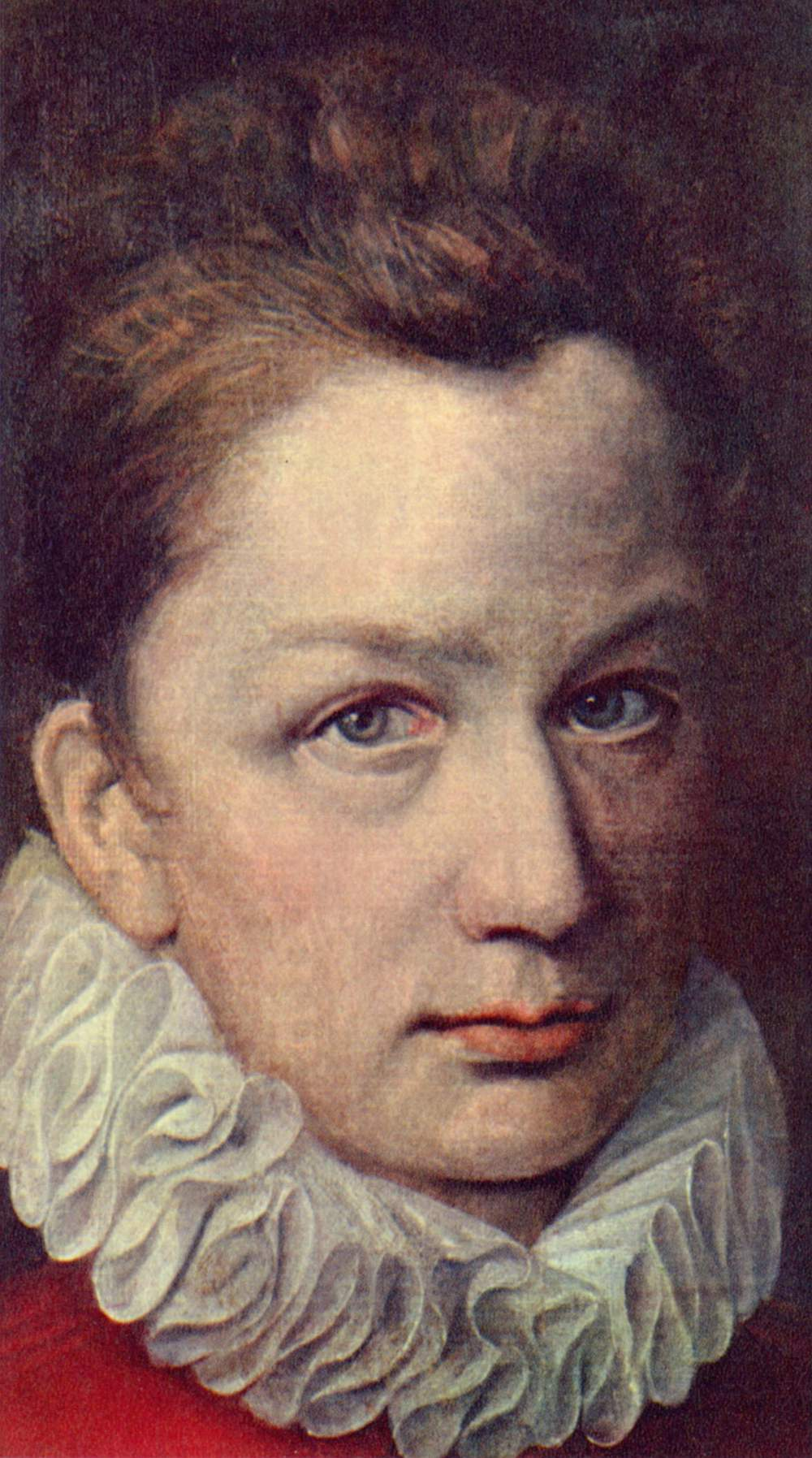
Portrait of a man by Pierre Dumonstier I (c. 1575, Hermitage Museum)

Pierre Dumonstier I (c. 1545 – c. 1610) was a French artist, notable as one of the masters of drawn portraiture of his period.

== Life ==
Pierre was the son of Geoffroy Dumonstier (died 1573), master painter illuminator to Francis I of France and Henry II of France. Pierre's brothers Étienne (c. 1540 – 1603) and Cosme (died 1605) were also artists – Catherine de Medici sent Étienne to Vienna to serve Maximilian II, whilst Cosme became painter to Marguerite de Navarre. Étienne's son Pierre and Cosme's illegitimate son Daniel also became artists.

Pierre I accompanied Étienne to Vienna in 1569 and there produced several portraits of him. Pierre was forced to enter Catherine de Medici shortly after Étienne, but his name only figures for the first time in the records of her court in 1583. Unlike his brother, he was not taken on by Henry IV of France, since in his will he always refers to himself as "painter and 'valet de feue' to the Queen Mother". He was then living in Paris on rue du Temple and left no issue.

Louis Dimier gathered 65 drawings in Pierre I's hand, mainly portraits of Étienne and Armand de Gontaut-Biron, inscribed "By Pierre Dumonstier for Daniel Dumonstier" (Musée Bonnat, Bayonne).

== Works ==
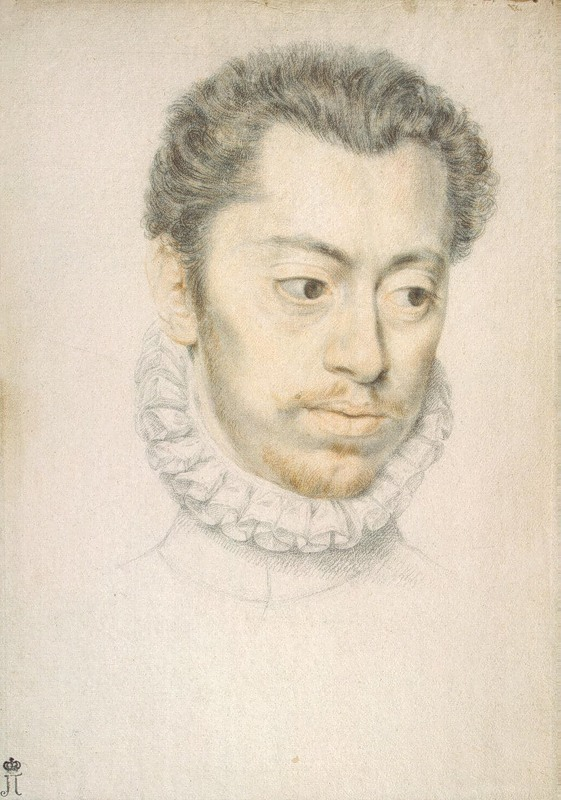
Portrait of Etienne Dumonstier, c. 1570, Hermitage Museum

=== Hermitage ===
- seven signed works.
- Double Portrait of Étienne and Pierre Dumoustier (c 1570, black chalk)
- Portrait of a woman (1570–1580, black and red chalk and pastel on brown paper)
- Portrait of Marguerite de Valois (? 1570–1580, black and red chalk and pastel on brown paper)
- Portrait of Étienne Dumoustier (c. 1570, black and red chalk, with some pastel)
- Portrait of a man (black chalk and pastel)
- Portrait of a young man (black and red chalk and pastel on brown paper)
- Portrait of a commander of the Spanish garrison (black chalk)
- Portrait of a man (1570–1575), oil

=== Other ===
- Portrait of a boy (c. 1610, oil on panel, John-Paul II Collection Museum, Warsaw)
- Portrait of Bernard de Nogaret de La Valette (c 1584, black and red chalk and watercolour; sold in Paris on 7 December 2015 and reproduced in colour in "La Gazette de l'Hôtel Drouot")

== Bibliography ==
- "DUMONSTIER, Pierre I. (1540 - 1625), Painter, draughtsman", article in Dictionnaire Bénézit, ISBN 9780199899913
