= Merian map of Paris =

17th-century map of Paris

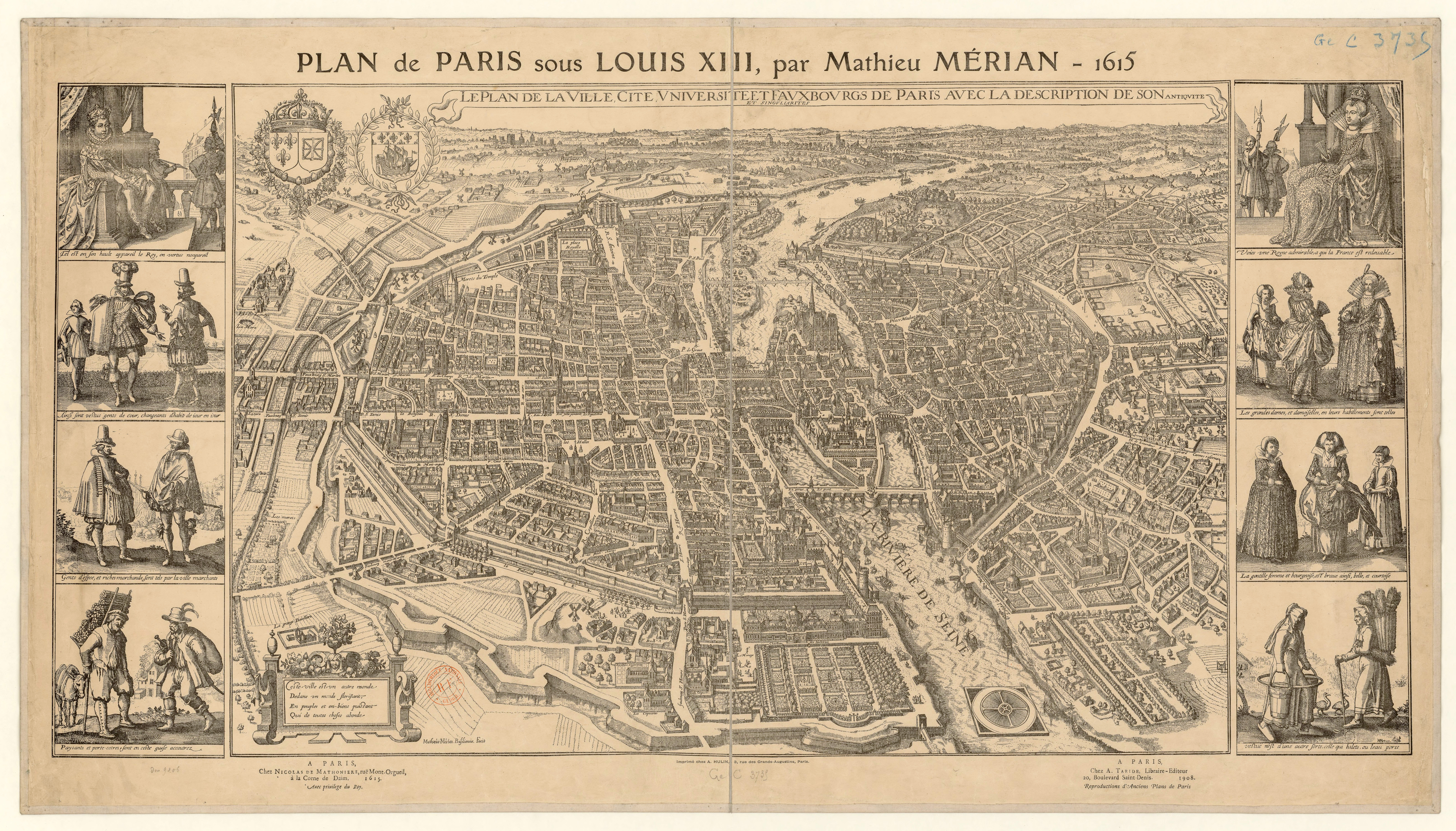
The plan of Merian as originally published

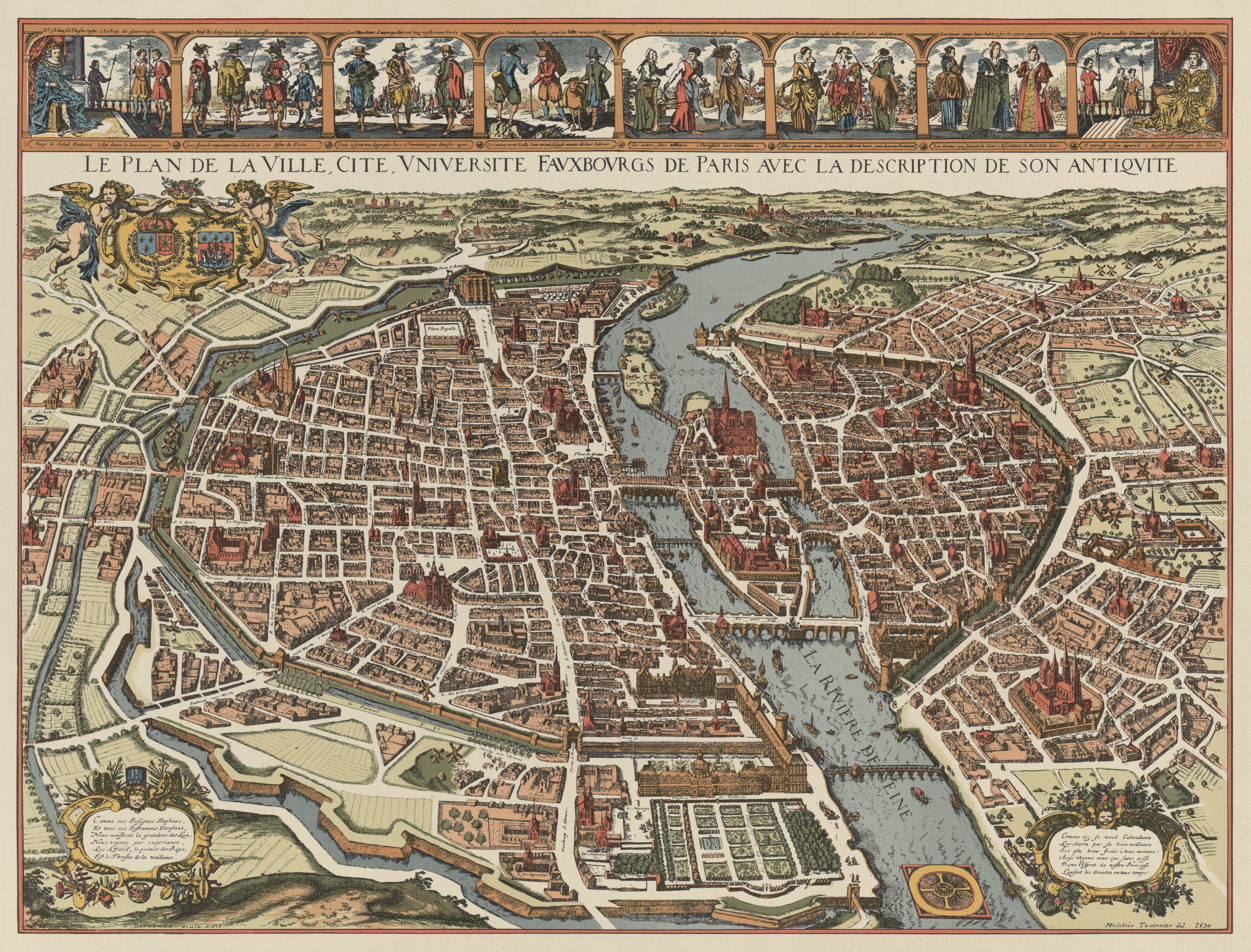
The plan of Merian in a colorized version

The Merian map of Paris (French: plan de Merian) was created in 1615 by Matthäus Merian the Elder. It presents a bird's eye view looking east with a scale of about 1 to 7,000. The map originally consisted of two engraved plates (50 x 37 cm each) with the left and right halves of the map and was printed with 2 columns of portraits (each 50 x 13 cm) on the left and right sides of the respective map halves. The entire assembly was 50 x 101.5 cm.

At the top is a banner with the title: LE PLAN DE LA VILLE, CITE, VNIVERSITE ET FAVX-BOVRGS DE PARIS AVEC LA DESCRIPTION DE SON ANTIQVITE ET SINGVLIARITES ("Map of the town, city, university and suburbs with the description of its antiquity and particularities"). In the upper left corner of the map, between the Château de Vincennes and the Marets du Temple, are the coat of arms of France and Navarre, encircled by the necklaces of the Orders of the Holy Spirit and of Saint Michael to just its right, the coat of arms of Paris surrounded by a crown of laurel leaves. The portraits on the left, top to bottom are: the king, courtiers, nobles and merchants, peasants and commoners; on the right: the queen, ladies of the court, noble and bourgeois women, common women. In the lower left of the map, beneath the farm of the Grange Batellière, there are four lines of verse:

Cette ville est un autre monde
Dedans, un monde florissant,
En peuples et en biens puissants
Qui de toutes choses abonde.

This city is another world
Therein a flowerful world,
Of people very powerful
To whom all things abound.

On the right of the poem is inscribed the name of the author of the map: Matheus Merian Basiliensis fecit ("did" in Latin). At the bottom of the map, there is an ornament with a large compass rose placed in the middle of the River Seine.

The Merian map was frequently used as the basis of subsequent maps, including those of Visscher (1618), Melchior Tavernier (c. 1625–1635), Jacob van der Heyden (1630), Christophe Tassin (1634), Dubarle (c. 1641), Giacomo Lauro (c. 1642), and Martin Zeiler (1655). In turn, the map of Tassin served as the source of numerous later maps.
