= Rondo =

Musical form consisting of principal and contrasting themes

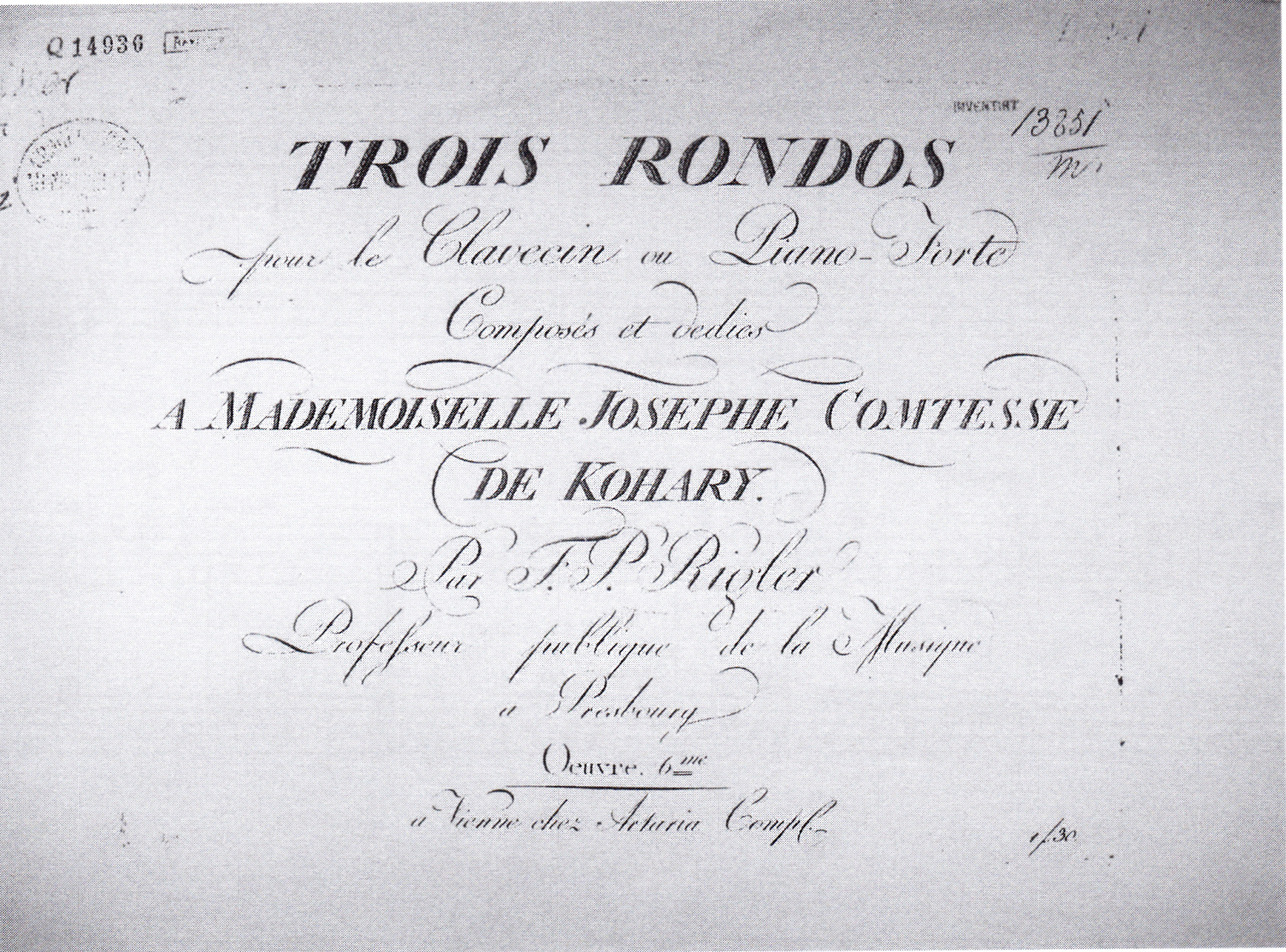
Title page of Franz Rigler's "Three Rondos" (1790)

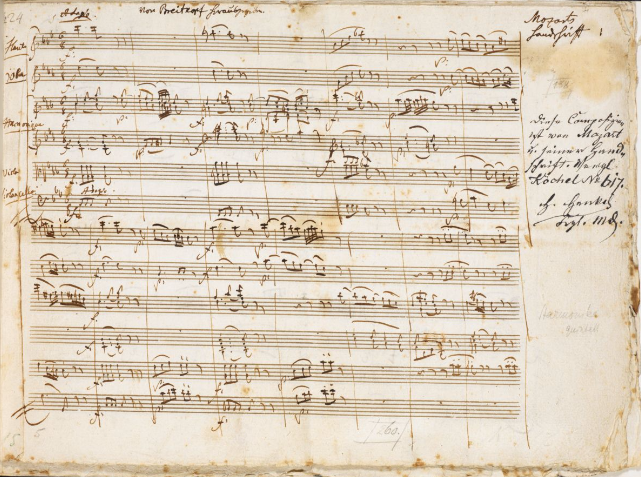
First page of the manuscript for Mozart's Adagio and Rondo for glass harmonica, flute, oboe, viola and cello

The rondo or rondeau is a musical form that contains a principal theme (sometimes called the "refrain") which alternates with one or more contrasting themes (generally called "episodes", but also referred to as "digressions" or "couplets"). Some possible patterns include: ABACA, ABACAB, ABACBA, or ABACABA (with the letter 'A' representing the refrain).

The rondo form emerged in the Baroque period and became increasingly popular during the Classical period. The earliest examples of compositions employing rondo form are found within Italian operatic arias and choruses from the first years of the 17th century. These examples use a multi-couplet rondo or "chain rondo" (ABACAD) known as the Italian rondo. Rondo form, also known in English by its French spelling rondeau, should not be confused with the unrelated but similarly-named forme fixe rondeau, a 14th- and 15th-century French poetic and chanson form.

While the origins of rondo form are to be found in Italian opera, it was the French composer Jean-Baptiste Lully (sometimes referred to as the father of the rondo or rondeau form), and his contemporaries Jacques Champion de Chambonnières and Louis Couperin, who popularized the rondo form in France in the 17th century. These composers were succeeded in the later Baroque period by French composers Jean-Marie Leclair, François Couperin, and most importantly Jean-Philippe Rameau, who continued to be important exponents of music compositions utilizing rondo form. Lully was the first composer to utilize a two-couplet design to his rondo structure, a technique he did not consistently adopt but which was later adopted and standardized by Rameau whose construction of the rondo was codified by the 17th century music theorist Jean Du Breuil in what became known as the French rondeau.

These French composers employed rondo form in a wide range of media, including opera, ballet, choral music, art songs, orchestral music, chamber music, and works for solo instrument. The French spread the popularity of the form internationally, and the rondo was soon adopted in the late 17th century and early 18th century by composers in other nations, including Henry Purcell in England and Johann Sebastian Bach in Germany. While J.S. Bach's rondos were written in the earlier French tradition of construction and were not particularly progressive, his son Carl Philipp Emanuel Bach was a highly imaginative and unusually innovative composer in the rondo form, producing thirteen sophisticated and highly personal rondos which place him as a central figure in this form at the end of the Baroque period and early Classical period.

By the beginning of the Classical period in 1750, the rondo form was already well established throughout Europe. The rondo form reached the height of its popularity in the late 18th century. During this period the rondo was most frequently employed by composers as a single movement within a larger work, particularly in concertos and serenades but also less frequently in symphonies and chamber music. However, independent rondos were still written in this period, often as virtuoso pieces. Many European composers of this era used the rondo form, including Joseph Haydn, Wolfgang Amadeus Mozart and Ludwig van Beethoven, each of which contributed to a significant body of classical music employing rondo form. These three composers were also important exponents of the sonata rondo form: a musical form developed in the Classical period which blended the structures of the sonata form with the form of the rondo.

In the 19th century composers in the Romantic period continued to use the form with some regularity. Some Romantic era composers to produce music utilizing rondo form include Beethoven, Johannes Brahms, Antonín Dvořák, Felix Mendelssohn, Franz Schubert, Robert Schumann, Richard Strauss, Florence Price and Pyotr Ilyich Tchaikovsky.

Rondo form has continued to be used by some 20th-century and 21st-century composers, most often by those with a Neoclassical aesthetic or to reference classical music composition in some fashion. Some 20th century composers to utilize rondo form include Alban Berg, Béla Bartók, Duke Ellington, Alberto Ginastera, Paul Hindemith, and Sergei Prokofiev.

== Etymology ==
The English word rondo comes from the Italian form of the French rondeau, which means "a little round". Today the word rondo is widely used in the English language to refer to any musical work, vocal or instrumental, containing a principal theme which alternates with one or more contrasting themes. However, some English and German speaking composers have also adopted the term rondeau over the term rondo to refer to their compositions utilizing this form; particularly when writing in a French compositional style.

In France, the word rondeau was first used in the Medieval and Renaissance periods to refer to the 'forme fixe rondeau'; a type of poetic and chanson form extant to France in the late 13th through 15th centuries. It originally developed as monophonic music (in the 13th century) and then as polyphonic music (in the 14th century). It disappeared from the repertoire by the beginning of the 16th century. Along with the formes fixes ballade and virelai, the forme fixe rondeau was limited to only vocal music due to its use within the specific context of French language poetry.

The forme fixe rondeau is entirely unrelated to the later musical form rondeau, which emerged principally in mid 17th century France but had its origins in Italian opera of the late 16th and early 17th century. It is this later music form which is now known as rondo in English. In the 18th century the term Round O, an English corruption of the French word ‘rondeau’, was also sometimes used in the English language to refer to the musical form rondeau. The term Round O was used in several 18th-century English publications, including Jeremiah Clarke's Choice Lessons for the Harpsichord or Spinett (London, 1711) and John Hoyle's A Complete Dictionary of Music (London, 1770). In James Grassineau 's A Musical Dictionary (1740) the term Round O was defined as an alternative spelling of rondeau.

== Definition and historical development ==
Typical tonal structure of classical seven-part rondo, late 18th and early 19th centuries
	A	B	A	C	A	B'	A
Major key	I	V	I	VI, IV or parallel minor	I	I	I
Minor key	I	III or V	I	VI or IV	I	I	I

In rondo form, a principal theme (sometimes called the "refrain") alternates with one or more contrasting themes, generally called "episodes", but also occasionally referred to as "digressions" or "couplets". Possible patterns include: ABACA, ABACAB, ABACBA, or ABACABA. The "ABACA" is often referred as "five-part rondo", the "ABACAB" and "ABACBA" are sometimes called "six-part rondo", and the ABACABA is commonly known as "seven-part rondo". The number of themes can vary from piece to piece, and the recurring element is sometimes embellished and/or shortened in order to provide for variation. Perhaps the best-known example of rondo form is Beethoven's "Für Elise", an ABACA rondo.

=== Origins in Italian opera ===
Writers on the origin of the rondo form have made connections to the use and development of ritornello in early Italian opera at the very end of the 16th century and early 17th century. While rondo form is similar to ritornello form, it is different in that ritornello form typically brings back the subject or main theme in a paraphrase of that theme through the use of fragments from previous musical passages and in different keys; whereas the rondo brings back its theme complete and in the same key.

Ritornello, meaning 'return' in Italian, has its origins in 15th century madrigals in which repetition or a return to particular stanza is a feature of the compositional structure. With the advent of opera in Italy in the very last years of the 16th century, ritornello form continued to develop specifically within the structure of the aria and opera chorus. Ritornello form was used in instrumental preludes, interludes or postludes (or any combination of these) within the aria and opera chorus; most frequently in the context of opera arias but also in 17th century sacred works such as vocal arias and choruses within oratorios and cantatas. Only 100 years later at the beginning of the 18th century was the ritornello technique transferred to the concerto; long after the rise of the rondo in France in the 17th century.

The use and development of ritornello in the aria served a practical purpose; as the structure was used to clearly separate vocal sections of the aria from the instrumental preludes, interludes or postludes within the composition. Repeating or paraphrasing instrumental music in the structure of the aria provided a felicitous dramatic structure which could facilitate character entrances and exits, emphasize dramatic intent, or could provide music used with scene transformations or even accompaniments for dances. Ultimately, the use of ritornello in Italian opera led to the creation of some early Italian arias and opera choruses which follow a traditional rondo form in which the main theme is repeated in its entirety and in the same key. The earliest example of this is within Jacopo Peri's Euridice (1600) in which the choruses "Al canto al ballo" and "Sospirate aure celesti" are arranged using a rondo structure. These early examples use a multi-couplet rondo or chain rondo (ABACAD) now known as the Italian rondo.

=== Rondeau form in French Baroque music ===
The rondo form, usually referred to in English using the French spelling rondeau when applied to French music, was a popular form in France from the mid to late 17th century and into the 18th century. The French composers of the Baroque period employed rondeau form in a wide range of media, including opera, ballet, choral music, art songs, orchestral music, chamber music, and works for solo instrument. The composer Jean-Baptiste Lully is sometime credited as the 'father of the rondeau', as he was allegedly the first composer to utilize a two-couplet design to his rondeau structure; a technique he did not consistently adopt but which was later adopted and standardized by Jean-Philippe Rameau whose construction of the rondeau was codified by the 17th century music theorist Jean Du Breuil in what became known as the French rondeau. Some examples of Lully's use of the French rondeau include the "Rondeau pour les basques" from the ballet Intermède de Xerxes (1660), the "Rondeau pour la gloire" from the prologue of the opera Alceste (1674), and the chorus "Suivons Armide" from the opera Armide (1686).

Three other important early rondeau composers of the Baroque period included Jacques Champion de Chambonnières and the brothers Louis Couperin and François Couperin; all of whom wrote several rondeau for keyboard. Chambonnières composed a French rondeau for keyboard in F major simply titled Rondeau, and also composed many chaconnes-rondeaux; some of which follow the two-couplet design of the French rondeau but others displaying up to as many as five couplets. Louis Couperin was also experimental with the number of couplets he employed in his rondeau compositions; usually using three or four couplets in his rondeau construction. Louis's Passacaille for harpsichord has a nine couplet rondeau form. François Couperin was the leading and most prolific French Baroque composer of rondeau composed for the harpsichord.

In the late part of the Baroque period, the composer Jean-Marie Leclair was a particularly innovative composer within the French rondeau form; especially within his aria movements for violin. Leclair was one of the earliest composers to change metre and tempo within a couplet such as in his op.1 no.9, Allegro ma non presto, and to contain a rondeau within a rondeau in the final couplet as in his opus 1 number 1, Aria.

=== Spread of the rondeau form internationally ===
The music of French Baroque composers like Lully and Rameau spread across Europe and influenced composers across the continent beginning in the late 17th century. Henry Purcell was one of the earliest composers in England to adopt the form; writing a Rondeau as the second movement of his music for the play Abdelazer by Aphra Behn which premiered at the Dorset Garden Theatre on July 3, 1676. In Germany, the composers Georg Muffat, Johann Caspar Ferdinand Fischer, and Johann Sebastian Bach all adopted French forms and techniques in some of their compositions; including utilization of the rondeau form. J.S. Bach's utilization of rondeau includes the Passepied I from Suite No. 5 in E minor (c. 1725) in his English Suites, the fifth movement 'Rondeaux' from Partita for keyboard No. 2, BWV 826 (c. 1725–1727), the third movement Partita for Violin No. 3 (1720), and the Rondeau from the Suite No. 2 in B minor (c. 1738–1739).

=== Rondo and sonata form ===
A common expansion of rondo form is to combine it with sonata form, to create the sonata rondo form. Here, the second theme acts in a similar way to the second theme group in sonata form by appearing first in a key other than the tonic and later being repeated in the tonic key. Unlike sonata form, thematic development does not need to occur except possibly in the coda.

=== Examples of rondo form ===
- Wolfgang Amadeus Mozart: Horn Concerto No. 4 in E-flat major, last movement
- Wolfgang Amadeus Mozart: Piano Sonata No. 11, last movement, nicknamed "Rondo alla turca"
- Wolfgang Amadeus Mozart: Piano Concerto No. 10 (Mozart), K. 365, last movement
- Ludwig van Beethoven: Rage Over a Lost Penny
- Ludwig van Beethoven: Rondo for piano and orchestra, WoO, 6
- Ludwig van Beethoven: Piano Sonata Op. 13, last movement
- Ludwig van Beethoven: Piano Concerto No. 5, last movement
- Antonín Dvořák: Cello Concerto in B minor, third movement
- Antonín Dvořák: Rondo for Cello and Orchestra
- Antonín Dvořák: Symphony No. 6, second movement
- Frédéric Chopin: Piano Concerto No. 1, third movement
- Aram Khachaturian: Violin Concerto, second movement
- Sergei Prokofiev: Symphony No. 5, fourth movement

== Character type ==
Rondo as a character-type (as distinct from the form) refers to music that is fast and vivacious – normally Allegro. Many classical rondos feature music of a popular or folk character. Music that has been designated as "rondo" normally subscribes to both the form and character. On the other hand, there are many examples of slower, reflective works that are rondo in form but not in character; they include Mozart's Rondo in A minor, K. 511 (marked Andante).

== Other usages ==
A well-known operatic vocal genre of the late 18th century, referred to at that time by the same name but distinguished today in English and German writing by the differently accented term "rondò" is cast in two parts, slow-fast.
