= John Hoyle =

John Hoyle may refer to:

- John Hoyle (died 1692), bisexual lawyer in London and an alleged lover of the writer Aphra Behn
- John Hoyle (author) (d. 1797?), author of a dictionary of musical terms
- John Hoyle (diplomat) (1927–2012), Australian public servant and diplomat
