= Jacques-Georges Chauffepié =

Jacques-Georges Chauffepié (9 November 1702 in Leeuwarden – 5 July 1786 in Amsterdam) was an 18th-century French biographer and a Calvinist minister and preacher. English, French, and Dutch name authorities identify him as Jacques-George de Chaufepié.

== Publications ==
- 1736: Lettres sur divers sujets importans de la religion. Also published as Brieven over gewigtige zaken betreffende den godsdienst (Haarlem, 1738).
- 1756: La verité de la religion chretienne prouvée par l’etat present du peuple juif .
- 1760: La pratique des vertus chrétiennes, ou Tous les devoirs de l’homme, which is a translation of the English The Whole Duty of Man.
- 1738: Histoire du monde, sacrée et profane, which is a translation of Samuel Shuckford's The Sacred and Prophane History of the World Connected. Chaufepié translated only the second volume. The first volume was translated by John Peter Bernard, and the third was translated by François-Vincent Toussaint.
- 1758: Histoire de la vie, et des ouvrages d’Alexandre Pope in the Œuvres diverses de Pope. This book-length piece is generally attributed to Chaufepie.
- 1742–1792: Histoire universelle, depuis le commencement du monde jusq’à présent, which was translated from the English An Universal History, from the Earliest Account of Time to the Present. Chaufepié translated volumes 15 through 24.
- 1750–1756: Nouveau dictionnaire historique et critique, pour servir de supplément ou de continuation, au Dictionnaire historique et critique de Mr. Pierre Bayle, which is a translation and extension of the English A General Dictionary, Historical and Critical, which is itself a translation and extension of Pierre Bayle's Dictionaire historique et critique. The idea of a supplement to Pierre Bayle’s Dictionaire historique et critique followed Bayle’s death in 1706, but little came of it. English writers eventually produced A General Dictionary, Historical and Critical, a considerably augmented translation of Bayle’s dictionary. The English editors had both enlarged articles written by Bayle and added new ones. Chaufepié undertook to translate this augmented work into French. Instead of merely translating the English text, Chaufepié himself added new material to existing articles and wrote completely new ones for his edition. Chaufepié’s Nouveau dictionnaire contains nearly 1400 articles. More than 600 articles he simply translated from A General Dictionary. He reworked another 280 articles, sometimes correcting his English authors, and he contributed 500 new articles. As a scholar, Chaufepié approaches the erudition of Bayle, but as critic and writer, Chaufepié falls far below him. Chaufepié’s plodding and defective style does not have the piquancy of Bayle’s prose, but on the other hand it does not carry the weight of Bayle’s cynicism. He wrote like the preacher he was. His dictionary is not a book that is pleasant to read, but it is very useful. It is only in a work of this scope that copious explanatory notes and dissertations on curious points of history or literature can be indulged, but the author has also been criticized for delving into minutia.
- 1787: Sermons sur divers textes de l’écriture sainte, précédés de son éloge, Amsterdam, 3 vols. These sermons were published by Samuel Chaufepié, Jacques George's nephew. Samuel mentions other minor works in his eulogy for his uncle.

== Sources ==
(in Dutch) Molhuysen, Philipp Christiaan; Blok, Petrus Johannes (1911–1937). "Chaufepié (Jacques George de)". In Knappert, Laurentius (ed.). Nieuw Nederlandsch biografisch woordenboek. Vol. 4. Leiden: A. W. Sijthoff. columns 417–418.

(in French) Haag, Eugène; Haag, Émile (1877–1888). "Chauffepié (et pied) ou de Chaufepié". In Bordier, Henri Léonard (ed.). La France protestante. Vol. 4. Paris: Sandoz & Fischbacher. columns 245–246.

Less reliable but still useful sources:

(in French) Michaud, Louis Gabriel (1842–1865). "Chauffepié (Jacques-George de)". In Desplaces, Eugène Ernest (ed.). Biographie universelle ancienne et moderne. Vol. 8 of 45 (2 ed.). Paris: Madame C. Desplaces. pp. 33–34.

(in French) Bouillet, Marie-Nicolas (1878). "Chauffepié (J.-George de)". In Chassang, Alexis (ed.). Dictionnaire universel d'histoire et de géographie (26 ed.). Paris: Hachette & Cie. Also known as the Dictionnaire Bouillet.
