= Jean-Edme Romilly =

Genevan theologian and encyclopédiste

Jean-Edme Romilly (1739 or 1740 in Geneva – 29 October 1779) was an 18th-century Genevan theologian and encyclopédiste.

== Biography ==
The son of the watchmaker, journalist and encyclopedist Jean Romilly, whom he predeceased, his mother was Elizabeth Adrienne Joly (born 1719) and his younger sister was Elisabeth Jeanne Pierrette Romilly (1742–1814). Jean-Edme studied theology until 1763 and was called to the ministry in 1763. Three years later, he was called as pastor of the Walloon church in London but his delicate health not accommodating to the climate, he returned to Geneva and was ordered to serve the church of Chancy. He married Françoise Dorothée Argand (1748–1797), with whom he had a daughter, Marie Joséphine Romilly (1770–1823). In 1770, the Council of State of Geneva granted him his resignation, "retaining him his rank, given his distinguished talents."

Charles Palissot de Montenoy, who knew him specifically, painted a man of gentle and regular manners, highly educated and endowed with the most amiable modesty. He left the reputation of a good preacher. His sermons were distinguished by a soft and persuasive unction rather than by a strong and male eloquence. In 1780, pastor Jean-Jacques Juventin published in Geneva a collection of his sermons in 2 vol. in-8°, putting ahead the Éloge of the author.

A friend of Rousseau, d'Alembert, Diderot and Voltaire, like his father Jean-Edme Romilly worked for the Encyclopédie to which he contributed the articles Tolérance and Vertu. He also provided several articles about famous Genevois, among others Jean-Jacques Rousseau, to the Mémoires de littérature by Palissot.

He was Juliette Cavaignac's uncle.

== Sources ==
- Eugène Haag, La France protestante, t. 8, Paris, Joël Cherbuliez, 1858, (p. 513).
