= Melchior Tavernier =

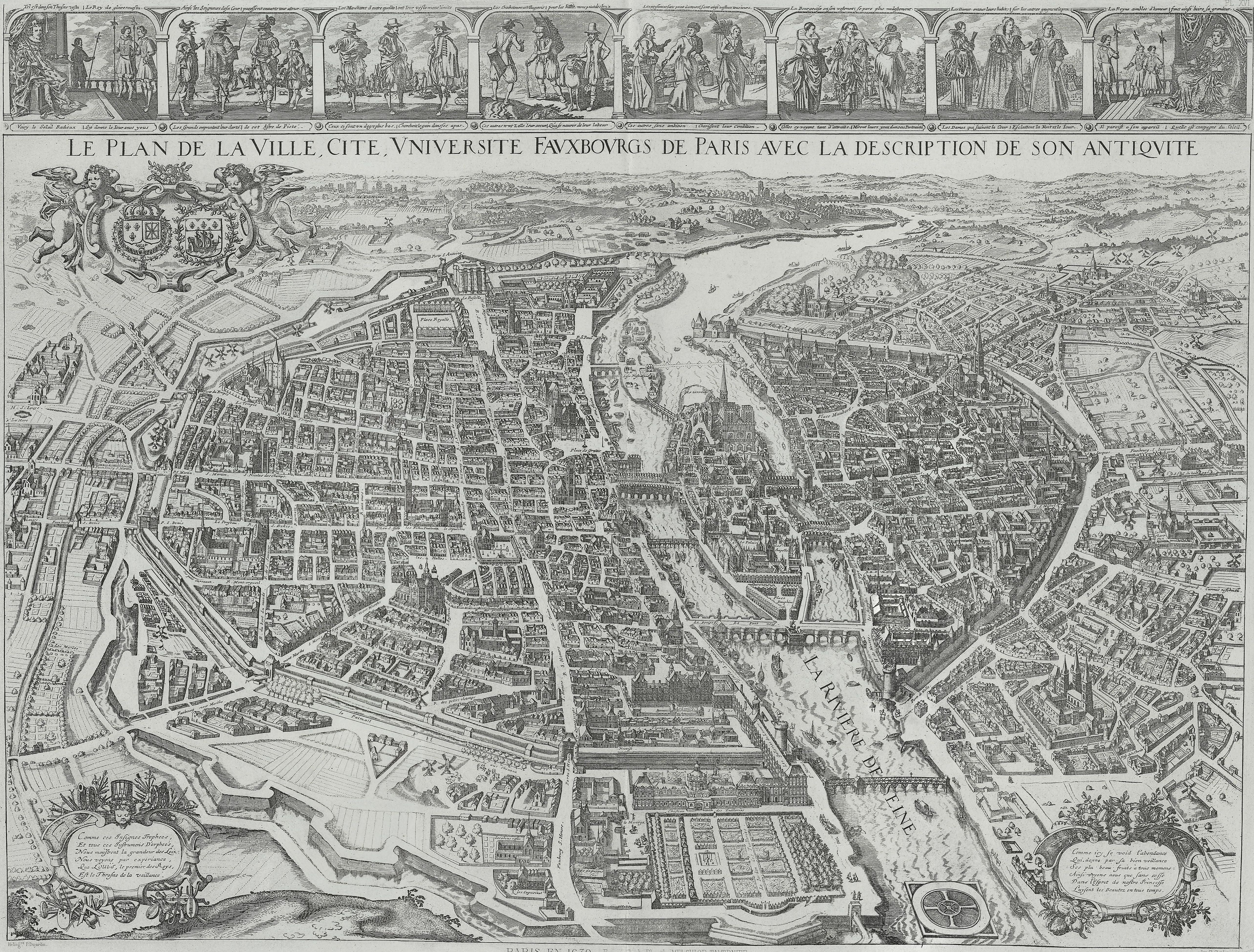
Plan of Paris published by Melchior Tavernier in 1630

Melchior Tavernier (1594 – May 1665) was a French engraver, printmaker and print publisher.

== Heritage, early life, and training ==
He was the son of Gabriel II Tavernier (1566–1607), an engraver, who in 1573 moved with his father Gabriel I Tavernier (born Bailleul c. 1520; died 1614) and his brother Melchior Tavernier (born 1544 or 1564; died 1641) from Antwerp to Paris. The younger Melchior Tavernier's mother was Suzanne Tonnelier. He had four siblings: Jean-Baptiste (who became a well-known writer and traveller), Gabriel III, Daniel, and Marie. His father, Gabriel II Tavernier, died in 1607; the inventory after his decease is dated 23 February 1607. By a contract of 30 June 1609, the younger Melchior Tavernier apprenticed with Thomas de Leu for four years at the age of fourteen, and from this Préaud et al. concluded he was born in 1594 or 1595. According to the Haag Brothers, he was baptised in 1594. It is often very difficult, with our current state of knowledge, to distinguish the work of the younger Melchior Tavernier from that of his uncle.

In 1589, when the Catholic League occupied Paris, the Tavernier family had fled to Tours, where Henri IV's court and the Parlement of Paris ruled in exile; the family lived there from 1590 to 1594. French engraving was of lower quality compared to the Flemish school, and Protestants, such as the family of Gabriel I Tavernier, brought high quality copperplate engraving to France. The first atlas of France, Le Théâtre françois, où sont comprises les chartes générales et particulières de la France, was published in Tours in 1594 by Maurice Bouguereau. It contained twenty maps of the provinces of France, the engraving of which was done by Gabriel Tavernier. Bouguereau said that the opportunity to use a highly skilled engraver encouraged him to publish the atlas.

After Gabriel I Tavernier returned to Paris, he resided on the Île du Palais, at 'L'Épi d'or', on the quai facing the Quai de la Mégisserie. After 1609 he was on the Pont Marchand, at the sign of 'La Huppe', parish of Saint-Barthélémy, where he remained in 1612. The elder Melchior Tavernier, who is otherwise obscure, claimed at a legal proceeding in 1620 that Gabriel I Tavernier introduced the art of etching to Paris and stated that his father died in 1614. On 7 December 1615, the assets of the elder Gabriel Tavernier's business and the lease for the house of 'La Huppe' on the Pont Marchand passed to the younger Melchior Tavernier's mother, Suzanne Tonnelier.

== Later life and career ==
In 1618 Melchior Tavernier became an intaglio engraver and printer to the king (graveur et imprimeur en taille-douce du Roi) with an emphasis on historical subjects and maps. On 2 April 1619 he married Sarah Pitten and on 30 April he purchased from his mother the assets of the family business and took over the lease of its premises, 'La Huppe' on the Pont Marchand. The couple had at least three daughters (Suzanne, Marie-Madeleine and Marie-Catherine) who were still living on 16 March 1638, when an inventory was drawn up after the death of their mother.

Abraham Bosse became an apprentice in the Tavernier shop in 1620, and Tavernier became one of his publishers. Between 1623 and 1629 Ludolph Büsinck made woodcuts for Tavernier after drawings by Georges Lallemand. Tavernier has an important place in the history of the French map trade. He published and sold maps and atlases of, among others, Henry Hondius, Jan Jansson, and Nicolas Tassin. He also published, beginning in 1632, early works by Nicolas Sanson, often referred to as the founder of French cartography.

Initially Tavernier continued to operate the shop at 'La Huppe' on the Pont Marchand but later moved to the Pont Notre-Dame 'à l'enseigne Franc Gaulois', then in 1621, to the Île du Palais, first at the corner of the rue de Harlay 'à la Rose rouge' and later on the quai facing the Quai de la Mégisserie 'à la Sphère royale' (1638 at the latest). On 12 February 1644 he sold part of his assets to François Langlois for five million livres and the rest to Pierre Mariette (1596–1657), the grandfather of Jean Mariette, for eleven million. Retired from business, he bought the office of contrôleur et clerc d'office de la maison du duc d'Orléans.

By a contract of 24 April 1658 Tavernier married Jeanne Gobille, sister of Gédéon Gobille, a seller of etchings. An illness in 1661 incapacitated Tavernier, and in May 1665 his wife had a document drawn up before a notary to protect her interests. Tavernier died shortly after: the inventory after his decease is dated 25 May 1665.

== Works ==
Works that he published include:

- Plan de la ville de Paris (1630).
- Plan de la ville de Toulouse (1631).
- Alessandro Francini, Livre d’architecture contenant plusieurs portiques de differentes inventions, sur les cinq ordres de colomnes (1631). Copy at INHA. Info at Architectura.
- Pierre Le Muet, Règles des cinq ordres d'architecture de Vignolle (1632). Info at Architectura.
- Carte géographique des postes qui traversent la France (1632).
- Le vray et primitif heritage de la couronne de France (1642).
- Jean Du Breuil, Perspective pratique (1642). Info at Architectura.

== Gallery ==
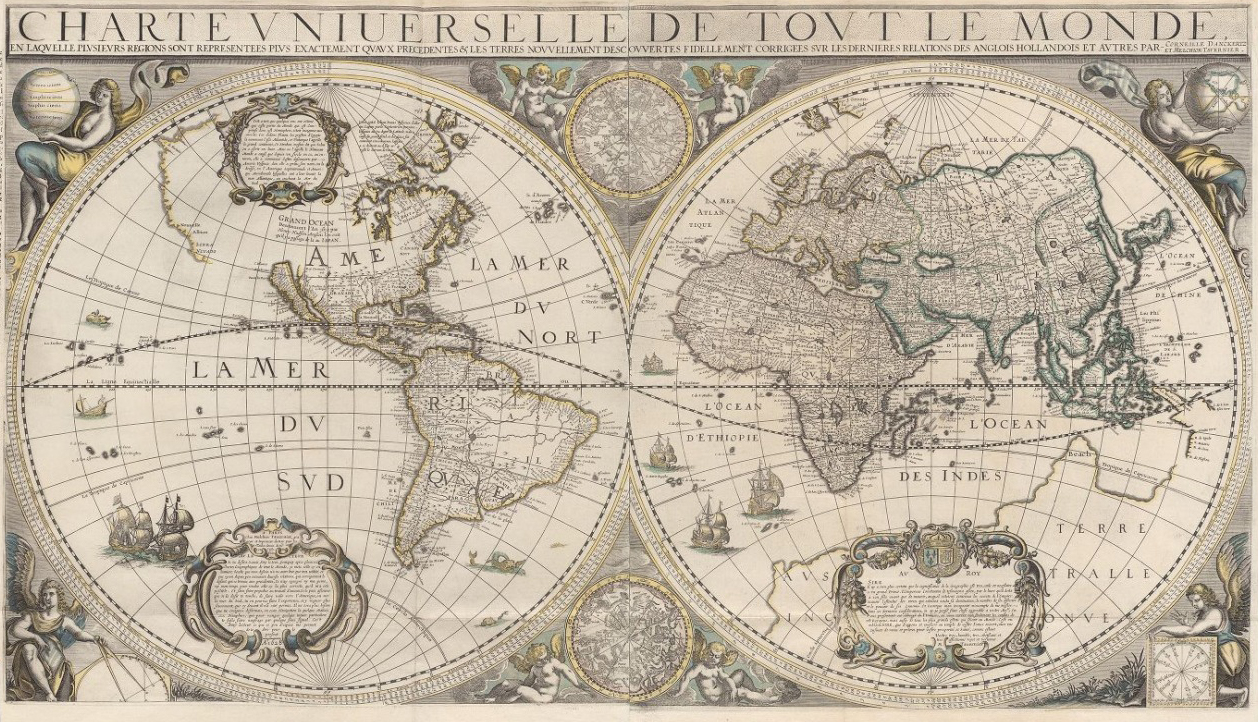
World map (1642)

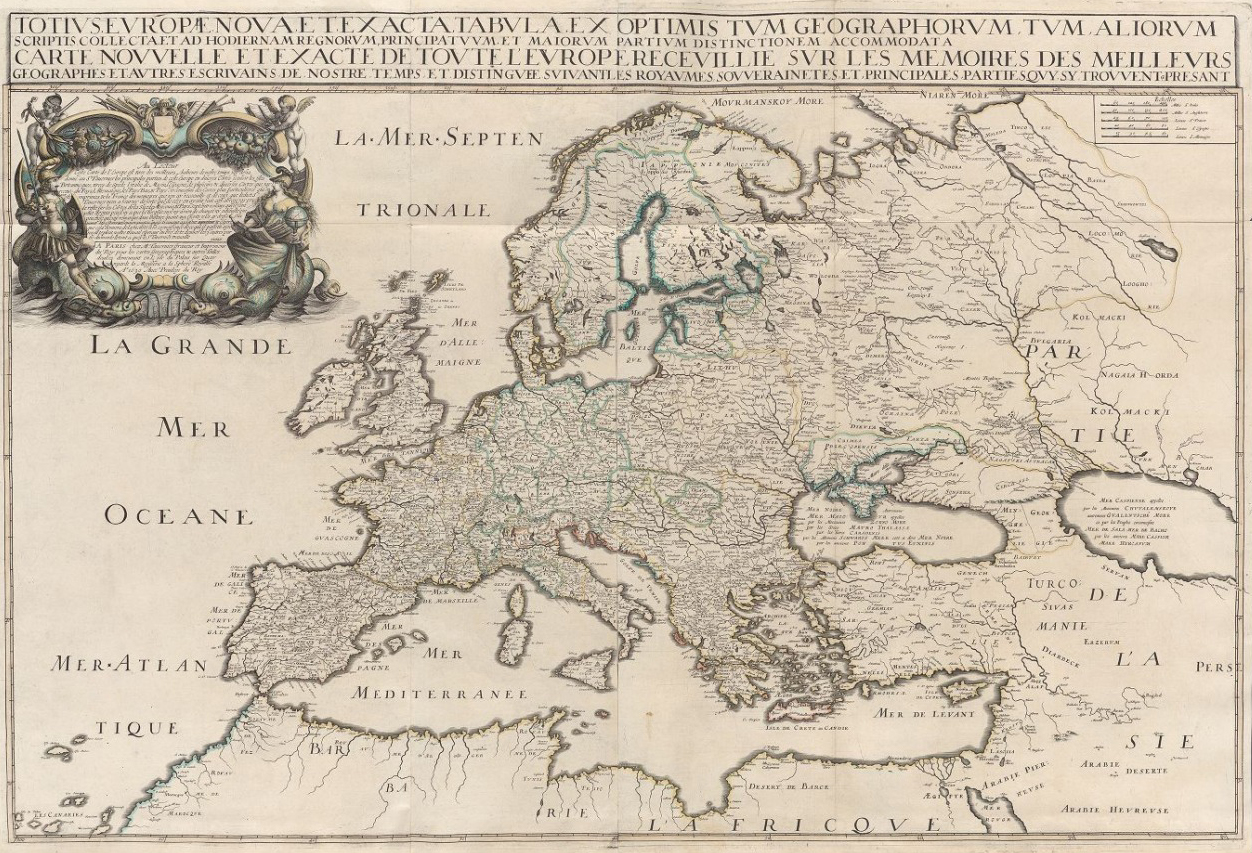
Map of Europe (1642)

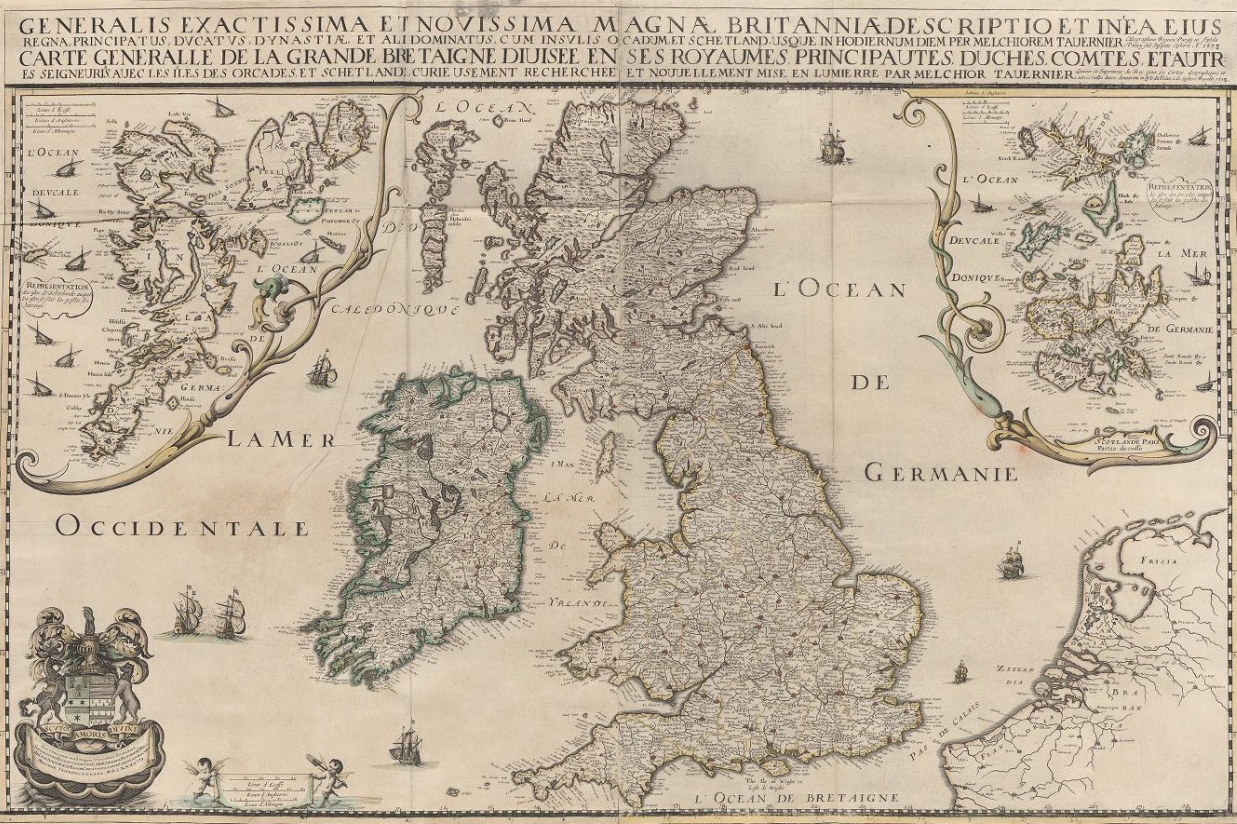
Map of England (1642)

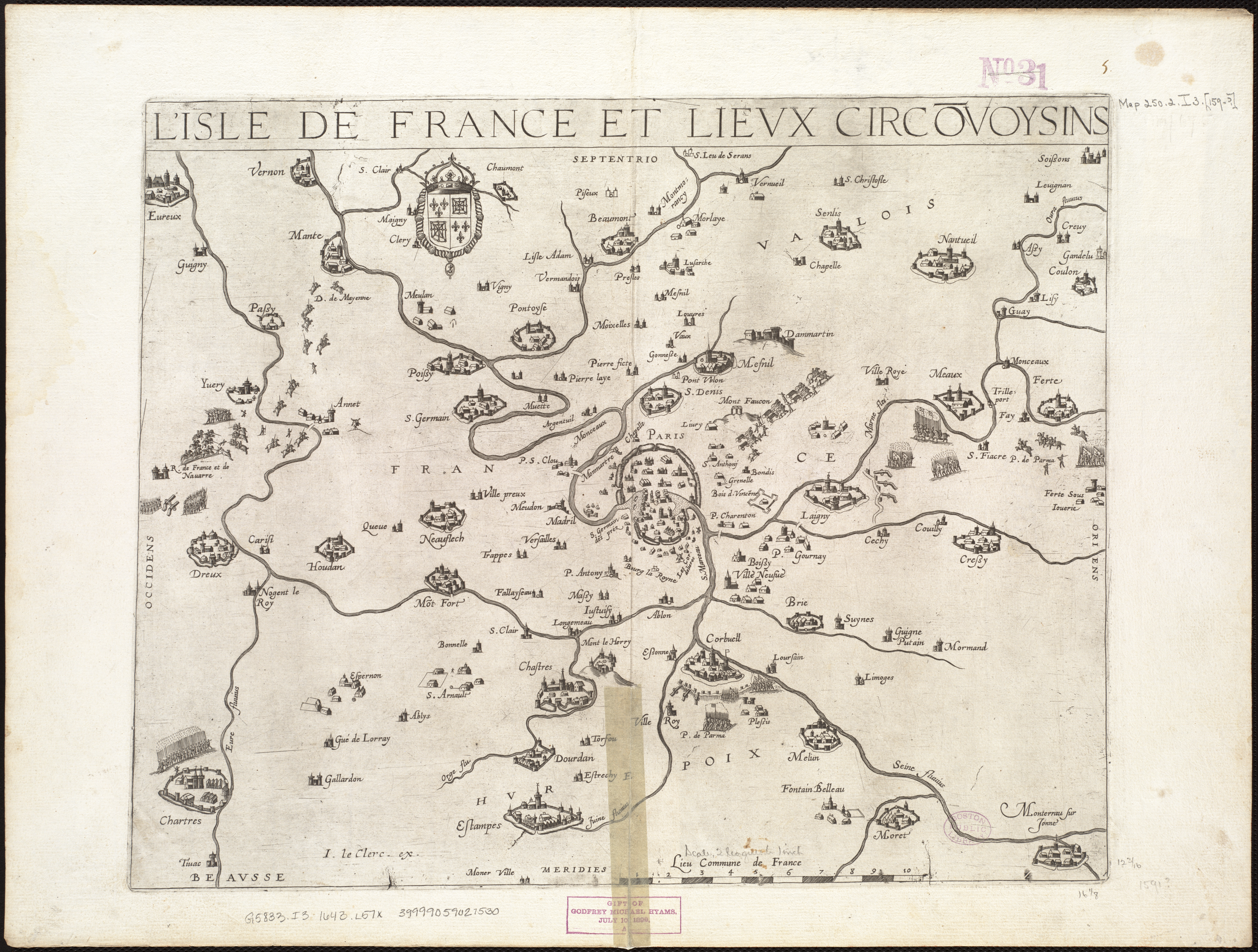
Isle de France (1643)

== Bibliography ==
- Anonymous (1996). "Büsinck. Ludolph", vol. 5, p. 294, in The Dictionary of Art, 34 volumes, edited by Jane Turner. New York: Grove. ISBN 9781884446009.
- Ballon, Hilary (1991). The Paris of Henri IV: Architecture and Urbanism. Cambridge, Massachusetts: The MIT Press. ISBN 9780262023092.
- Benezit (2006a). "Tavernier, Gabriel", vol. 13, p. 732, in Benezit Dictionary of Artists. Paris: Gründ. ISBN 9782700030709.
- Benezit (2006b). "Tavernier, Melchior", vol. 13, p. 733, in Benezit Dictionary of Artists. Paris: Gründ. ISBN 9782700030709.
- Bouguereau, Maurice (1594). Le Théâtre françois, où sont comprises les chartes générales et particulières de la France. Tours: Maurice Bouguereau. Copy at Gallica.
- Fordham, Herbert George (1909). Studies in carto-bibliography, British and French, and in the bibliography of itineraries and road-books. Oxford: Clarendon Press. Copy at Internet Archive.
- Goldstein, Carl (2012). Print Culture in Early Modern France: Abraham Bosse and the Purposes of Print. New York: Cambridge University Press. ISBN 9781107012141.
- Grivel, Marianne (1996). "Leu, Thomas de", vol. 19, p. 257, in The Dictionary of Art, 34 volumes, edited by Jane Turner. New York: Grove. ISBN 9781884446009.
- Haag, Eugène; Émile Haag (1859). "Tavernier", vol. 9, p. 344, in La France protestante: ou, Vies des protestants français, 10 volumes. Paris, 1846–1859. Hathitrust catalog record.
- Nagler, Georg Kaspar (1848). "Tavernier, Melchior", vol. 18, pp. 144–147, in Neues allgemeines Künstler-Lexicon, 22 volumes. Munich: E. A. Fleischmann, 1835–1852. HathiTrust catalog record.
- Pedley, Mary Spoonberg (1981). "The Map Trade in Paris, 1650-1825," Imago Mundi, vol. 33 (1981), pp. 33–45. JSTOR 1150782.
- Préaud, Maxime; Pierre Casselle; Marianne Grivel; Corinne Le Bitouze (1987). Dictionnaire des éditeurs d'estampes à Paris sous l'Ancien Régime. Promodis. ISBN 2903181608.
- Scott, Valerie, editor (2004). Tooley's Dictionary of Mapmakers, revised edition, Q–Z. Riverside, Connecticut: Early World Press. ISBN 9780906430217.
- Walsh, Amy L. (1996). "Mariette family", vol. 20, pp. 415–418, in The Dictionary of Art, 34 volumes, edited by Jane Turner. New York: Grove. ISBN 9781884446009.
