= Jean Romilly =

Genevan watchmaker, journalist and encyclopédiste

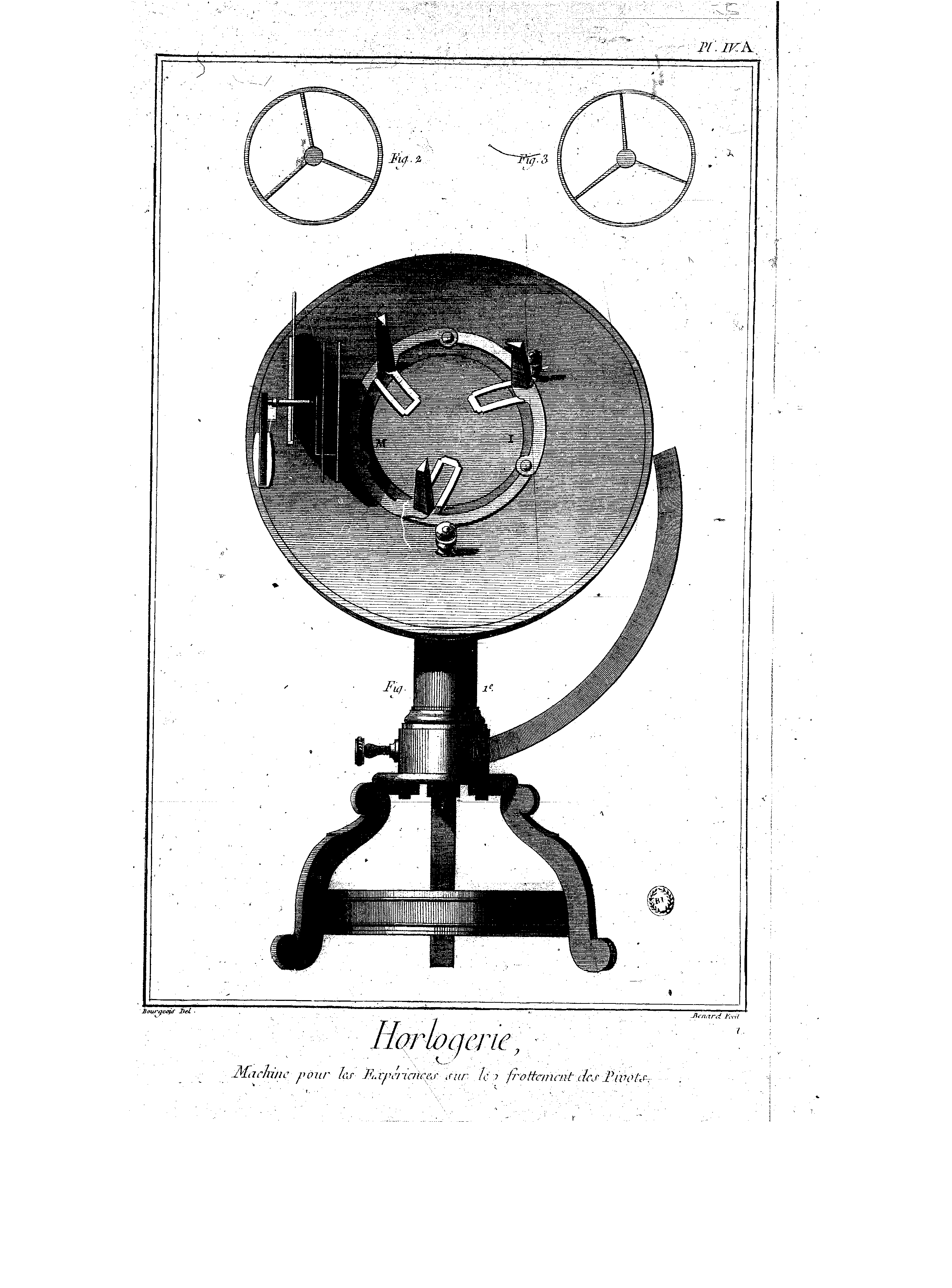
- Planche Horlogerie de l’Encyclopédie, t. 3., p. 405
- Born: 27 June 1714; Geneva, Republic of Geneva
- Died: 16 February 1796 (aged 81); Paris, France
- Occupations: Watchmaker; Journalist

Jean Romilly (27 June 1714 – 16 February 1796) was an 18th-century Genevan watchmaker, journalist and encyclopédiste.

Born in a Huguenot family which took refuge in Geneva following the Edict of Fontainebleau, Romilly became known by various improvements he made to his art. He realized, among other remarkable works, a watch that could go a whole year without being winded, but he left Ferdinand Berthoud the honor to give his invention the required degree of accuracy.

Romilly was one of the founders of the Journal de Paris in 1777, and an editor of the Encyclopédie by Diderot and d’Alembert, to which he contributed articles on the theoretical part of watchmaking.

His son, theologian Jean-Edme Romilly also collaborated with the Encyclopédie. His daughter, Jeanne, was general Cavaignac's grandmother.

== Sources ==
- E. Haag, La France protestante, t. 8, Paris, Joël Cherbuliez, 1858, (p. 513).
- G. H. Baillie: Watchmakers and Clockmakers of the World. (1929) Reprint Read Books, 2006, ISBN 1-4067-9113-X.
- Kathleen H. Pritchard: Swiss Timepiece Makers 1775 – 1975. Phoenix-Verlag, USA. ISBN 0-9146-5979-0.
- R.A. Leigh (Ed.): Correspondance complète de Jean-Jacques Rousseau. 52 vol. 1965–1998.
