= Ludolph Büsinck =

German painter

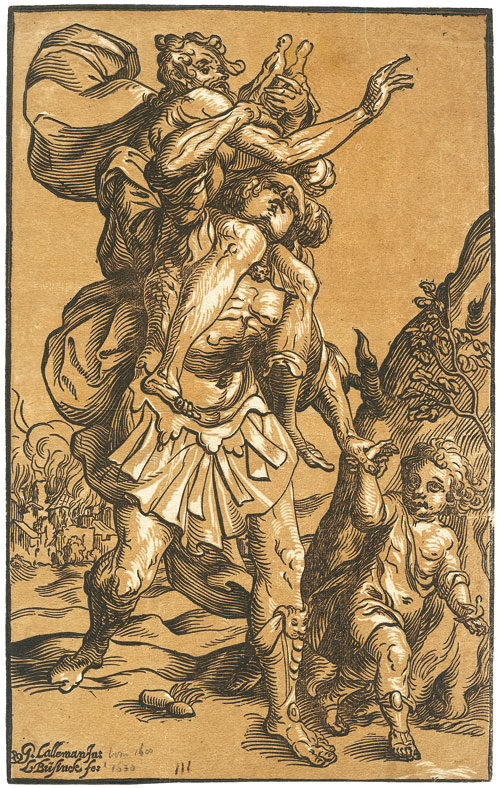
Aeneas saving Anchises from the Burning of Troy, chiaroscuro wood engraving after Georges Lallemand.

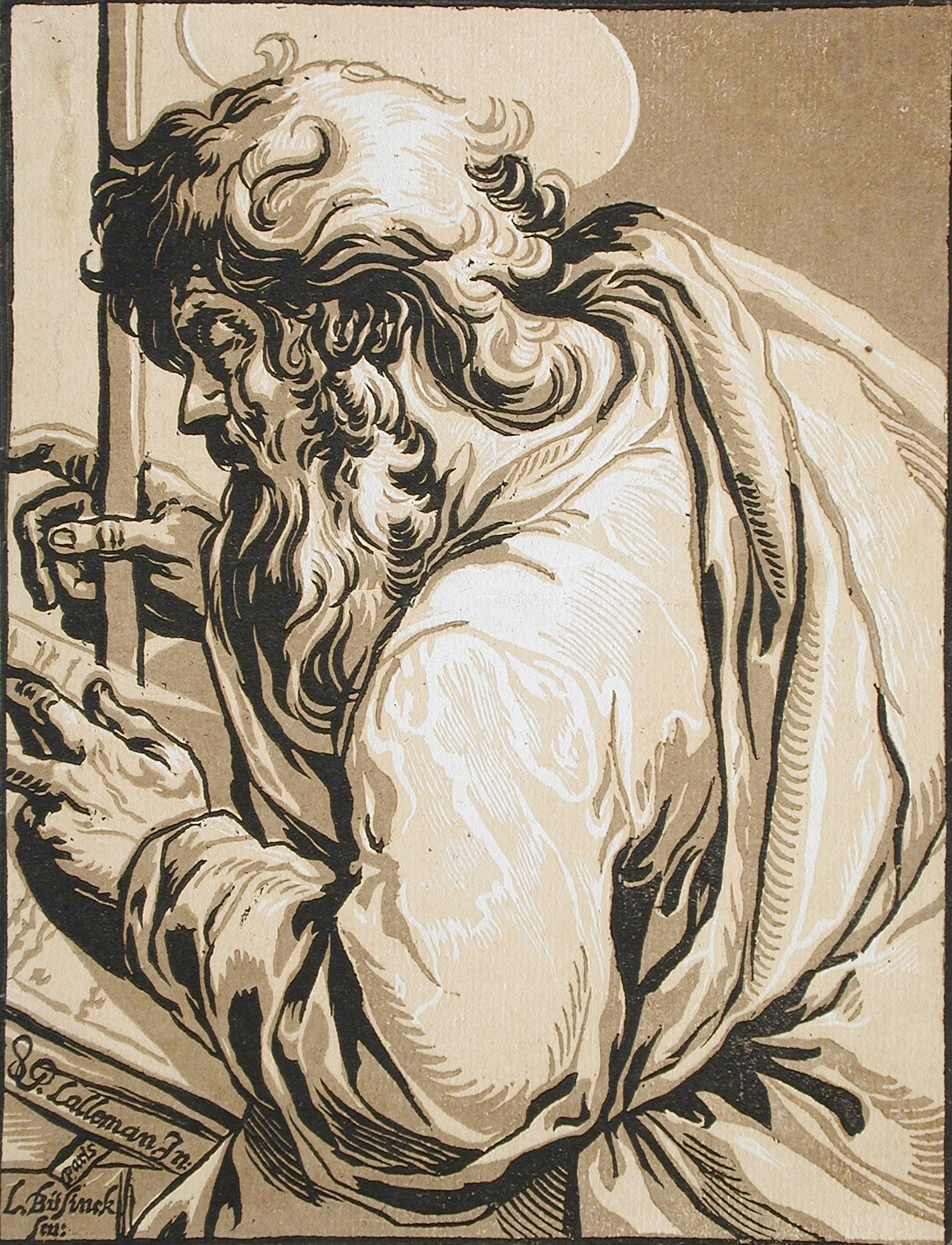
St Matthew, chiaroscuro wood engraving after Georges Lallemand

Ludolph Büsinck (c.1600–1669) was a German painter and wood-engraver, born at Hann. Münden in the 1590s. He worked in Paris between 1623 and 1630, where he produced a series of chiaoscuro woodcuts, the first to be made in France. His name is sometimes spelled "Buesinck".

== Life ==
Büsinck was born at Hann. Münden in central Germany between 1599 and 1602, a son of Johann Büsinck and his wife, Kunigunde Voss. He married Katharina Ludwig, with whom, according to baptismal records, he had six children. He may have trained as an artist in the Netherlands.

Between 1623 and 1630 he is known to have been in Paris, where he made a number of dated chiaroscuro prints, some of which were published by Melchior Tavernier. They are boldly cut works in the tradition of the Dutch printmaker Hendrick Goltzius. He was the first artist to make chiaroscuro woodcuts in France, and most his works in this technique were based on drawings by the painter Georges Lallemand, although one, probably his first, is after a painting by Abraham Bloemaert. He is not known to have made any woodcuts after 1630.

He returned to Hann. Münden, where he became a member of the merchants' guild (Kaufmannsgilde) in 1639. He is known to have been active as a painter in the 1630s, his works including an altarpiece for the high altar of the church of St John in Göttingen. In 1647 he is recorded as acting as a customs official.

He died at Münden on 15 January 1669.

== Works ==
His prints include religious subjects, and images of cavaliers, peasants, musicians and beggars.

His work is kept in many museums worldwide, including the Ashmolean Museum, the Cleveland Museum of Art, the Nelson-Atkins Museum of Art, the Smart Museum of Art, the Harvard Art Museums, the University of Michigan Museum of Art, the Los Angeles County Museum of Art, the Blanton Museum of Art, the Philadelphia Museum of Art, the Bowdoin College Museum of Art, and the British Museum.

== Bibliography ==
- Hollstein, F. W. H., Dutch And Flemish Etchings, Engravings And Woodcuts c. 1450–1700, Amsterdam, 1949
- Strauss, Walter L., Chiaroscuro: The Clair-Obscur Woodcuts By The German And Netherlandish Masters Of The XVI And XVII Centuries, London, Thames & Hudson, 1973
- Roethlisberger, Marcel G., Abraham Bloemaert and His Sons: Paintings And Prints, 2 vols., Ghent, 1993
- Stechow, Wolfgang, Ludolph Buesinck The Print Collector’s Quarterly 1938 Dec Vol. 25, No. 4, p. 393
- Stechow, Wolfgang, Catalogue of the Woodcuts by Ludolph Buesinck The Print Collector’s Quarterly 1939 Oct Vol. 26, No. 3, p. 349
