= Christophe Tassin =

17th-century French cartographer

Christophe Tassin (born in the early 1600s in France; died in 1660 in France), also known as Nicolas Tassin, Christophe Nicolas Tassin or Christophe Le Tassin, was a French cartographer, known for his atlases of France, Spain, Germany and Switzerland. Most of his work was published in Paris from 1633 to 1635. Among his colleagues were Melchior Tavernier (1594–1665), Sébastien Cramoisy (1584–1669) and Michael van Lochum (1601–1647). Little is known of his personal life.

== Career ==
Up to 1631 Christophe Tassin was a French Royal Engineer and Geographer (Ingenieur et Geographe du Roy), working on assigned political and military projects. As part of his appointment, he received the right to publish his work for ten years, though he used it only between 1633 and 1638. (His successor as Royal Engineer and Geographer and publisher was Sébastien de Beaulieu [1612–1674].)

In 1633 Tassin published an atlas of France and Spain, Cartes générales des provinces de France et d’ Espagne; one of Germany, Cartes généralis des royaumes et provinces de la haute et basse Allemagna; and one of the Low Countries, Plans et profils des principales villes du duché de Lorraine, avec les cartes generale et particulieres de chacun gouvernement d’iucelles.

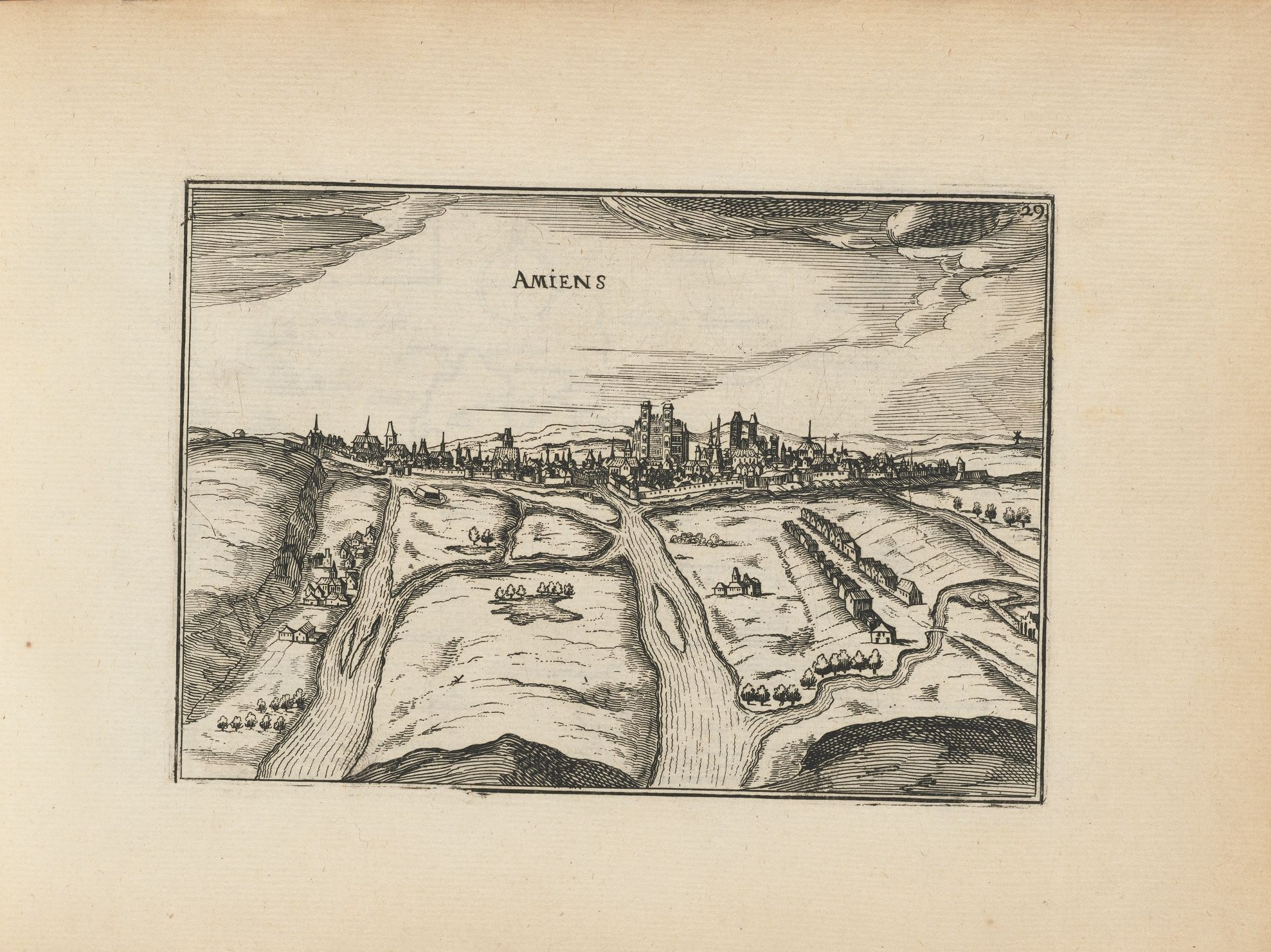
View of Amiens in 1634

In 1634 he published his magnum opus, an atlas – in an oblong quarto format, for which he is best known – with maps, views and plans of cities and other places in France, Les plans et profils de toutes les principales villes et lieux considerables de France, as well as a coastal atlas of France, Carte générale de toutes les costes de France.

In 1635 he published an atlas of Switzerland, Description de tovs les cantons, villes, bourgs, villages et av tres particularitzes du pays des Suisses. His inclusion of the Low Countries in a single volume had a practical reason: in 1631 a great part of the region had been conquered by King Louis XIII, which caused a need for rapidly published information.

In 1644 Tassin ended his work, and sold his copper plates of maps to Antoine de Fer (16xx–1673), who published them in many subsequent editions.
