= Jean Du Breuil =

French writer and essayist (1602–1670)

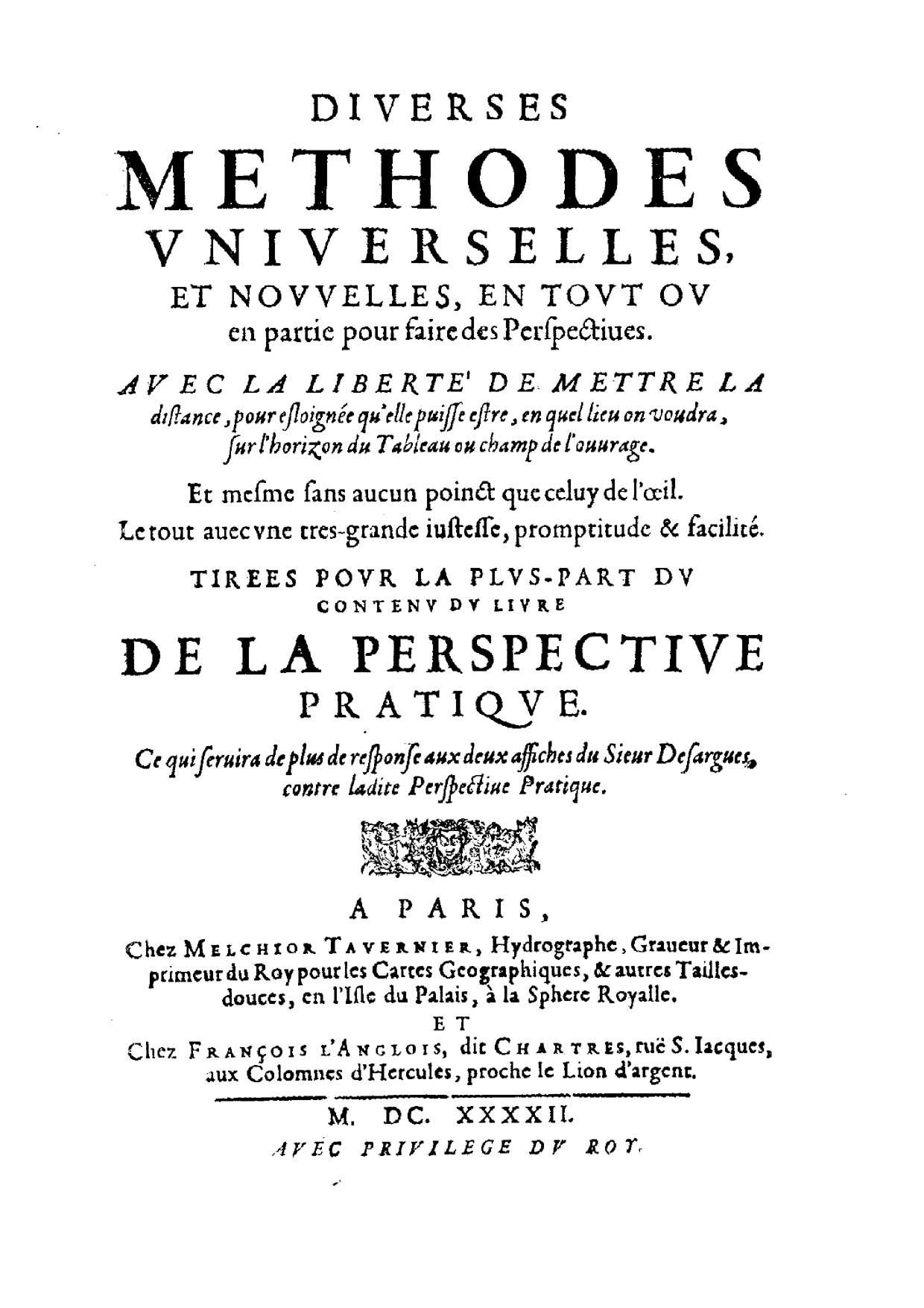
Diverses methodes universelles et nouvelles, en tout ou en partie pour faire des perspectives, 1642

Jean Dubreuil, also known as Jean Du Breuil (22 July 1602 – 27 April 1670), was a French mathematician, music theorist, writer and essayist.

== Life ==
Son of the bookseller Claude Du Breuil, he continued his father's profession until he joined the Society of Jesus. He lived for a long time in Rome where he studied architecture. He is known for his work about the theory and practice of perspective.

== Works ==
- Breuil, Jean (1642). Diverses methodes universelles et nouvelles, en tout ou en partie pour faire des perspectives (in French). A Paris: François Langlois.
- Du Breuil, Jean (1642). Advis charitables sur les diverses œuvres, et feuilles volantes du sr. Girard Desargues (in French). A Paris: François Langlois, Melchior Tavernier.
- La perspective practique, 1642–1649
- L'Art universel des fortifications
