= Georges Lallemand =

French painter

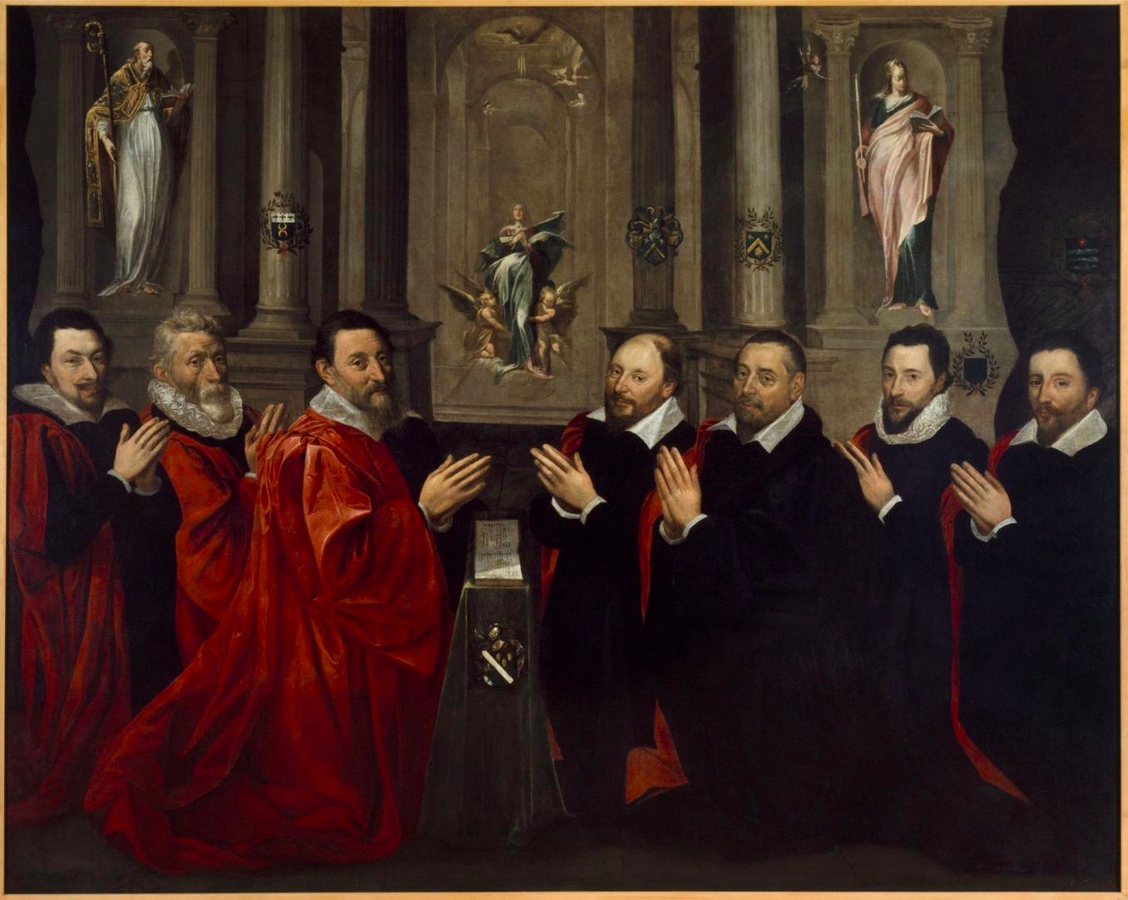
The Mayor and Aldermen of Paris, 1611 (Musée Carnavalet).

Georges Lallemand (French pronunciation: [ʒɔʁʒ lalmɑ̃]; before 1575–1636) was a French artist. His name is sometimes given as "Lallemant".

== Life ==
Lallemand was born in Nancy in around 1575. Nothing is known of his artistic education, but he is often assumed to have been a pupil of Jacques Bellange, whose work seems to have had a significant impact on him. He moved to Paris in about 1601 and by 1605 had established a successful studio, where his pupils included Philippe de Champaigne, Laurent de la Hyre and Nicolas Poussin.

His style was eclectic, combining Flemish realist and mannerist influences. Few of his paintings have been traced, much of his work having been dispersed when church property was seized during the French Revolution. His earliest known work, The Mayor and Aldermen of Paris (Musée Carnevalet) dates from 1611. He was appointed Peintre ordinaire du roi in 1626.During the last few years of his life he received commissions for altarpieces and tapestries for the cathedral of Notre Dame, and for six large paintings for the Parisian church of Saint Geneviève-du-Mont. His work can also be seen in the Église St-Joseph-des-Carmes in the Baroque Chapelle Ste-Anne. There is an Adoration of the Magi, in the collection of the Palais des Beaux Arts in Lille. and another version of the same subject in the Hermitage.

His work is mostly known from a series of chiaoscuro woodcuts made by Ludolph Büsinck in the 1620s after his smaller religious and genre compositions.
