= John Hoyle (author) =

John Hoyle (d. 1797?), was author of a dictionary of musical terms entitled Dictionarium Musica [sic]; Being a Complete Dictionary or Treasury of Music, London, 1770; It was republished, with a new title, in 1790 and 1791. The work was pronounced "short and incomplete" by the Critical Review for February 1791.
