= Haag Brothers =

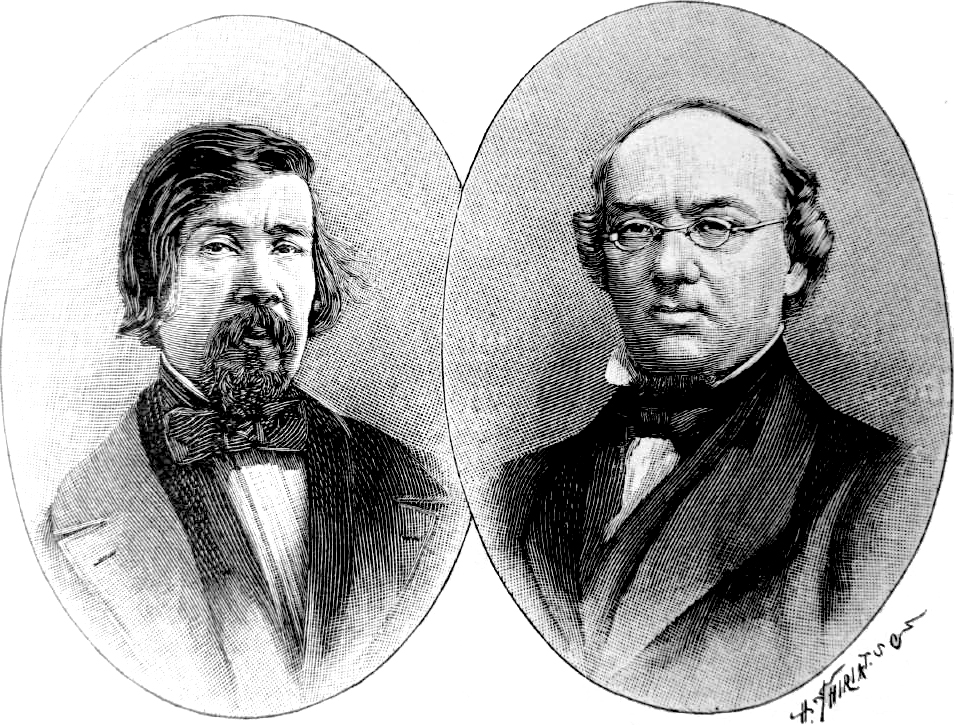
The Haag Brothers, wood-engraving by Henri Thiriat.

The brothers Eugene Haag (11 February 1808 – 5 March 1868) and Émile Haag (18 November 1810 – 11 May 1865) were two French Protestant historians and theologians, known collectively as the Frères Haag or the Haag Brothers.

They were born in Montbéliard. Both died in Paris, Eugene at the age of 60 and Émile at the age of 54.
