= Charles-Nicolas Cochin =

French artist (1715–1790)

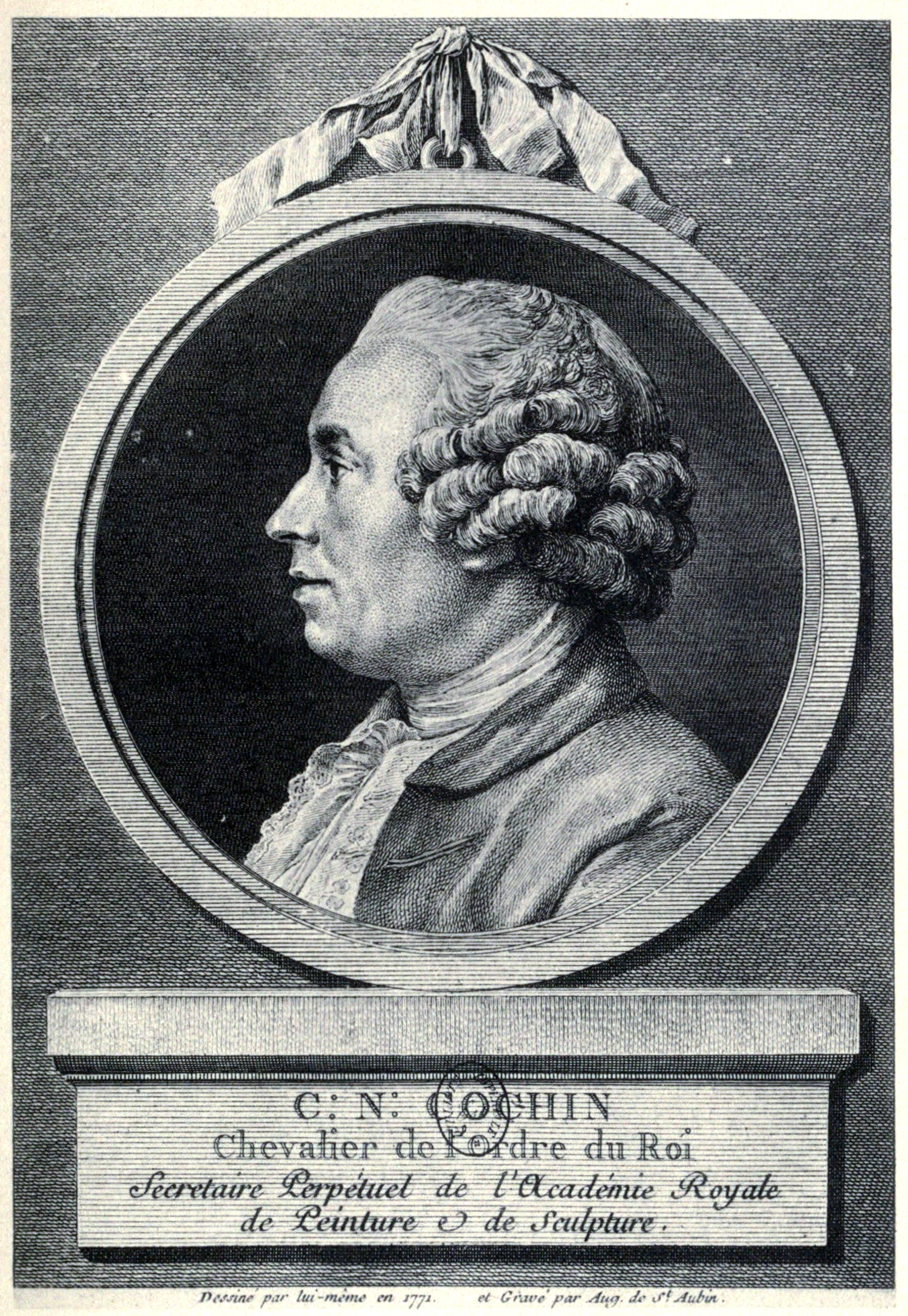
- Born: Charles-Nicolas Cochin; 22 February 1715; Paris, Kingdom of France
- Died: 29 April 1790 (aged 75); Paris, Kingdom of France
- Education: Charles-Nicolas Cochin the elder
- Known for: Engraver, designer, and writer
- Movement: Baroque
- Spouse: Louise-Magdeleine Horthemels
- Relatives: Marie-Anne Horthemels (sister-in-law); Frédéric Horthemels (brother-in-law)
- Patrons: King Louis XV, French court

Charles-Nicolas Cochin (22 February 1715 – 29 April 1790) was a French engraver, designer, writer, and art critic. To distinguish him from his father of the same name, he is variously called Charles-Nicolas Cochin le Jeune (the Younger), Charles-Nicolas Cochin le fils (the son), or Charles-Nicolas Cochin II.

== Early life ==
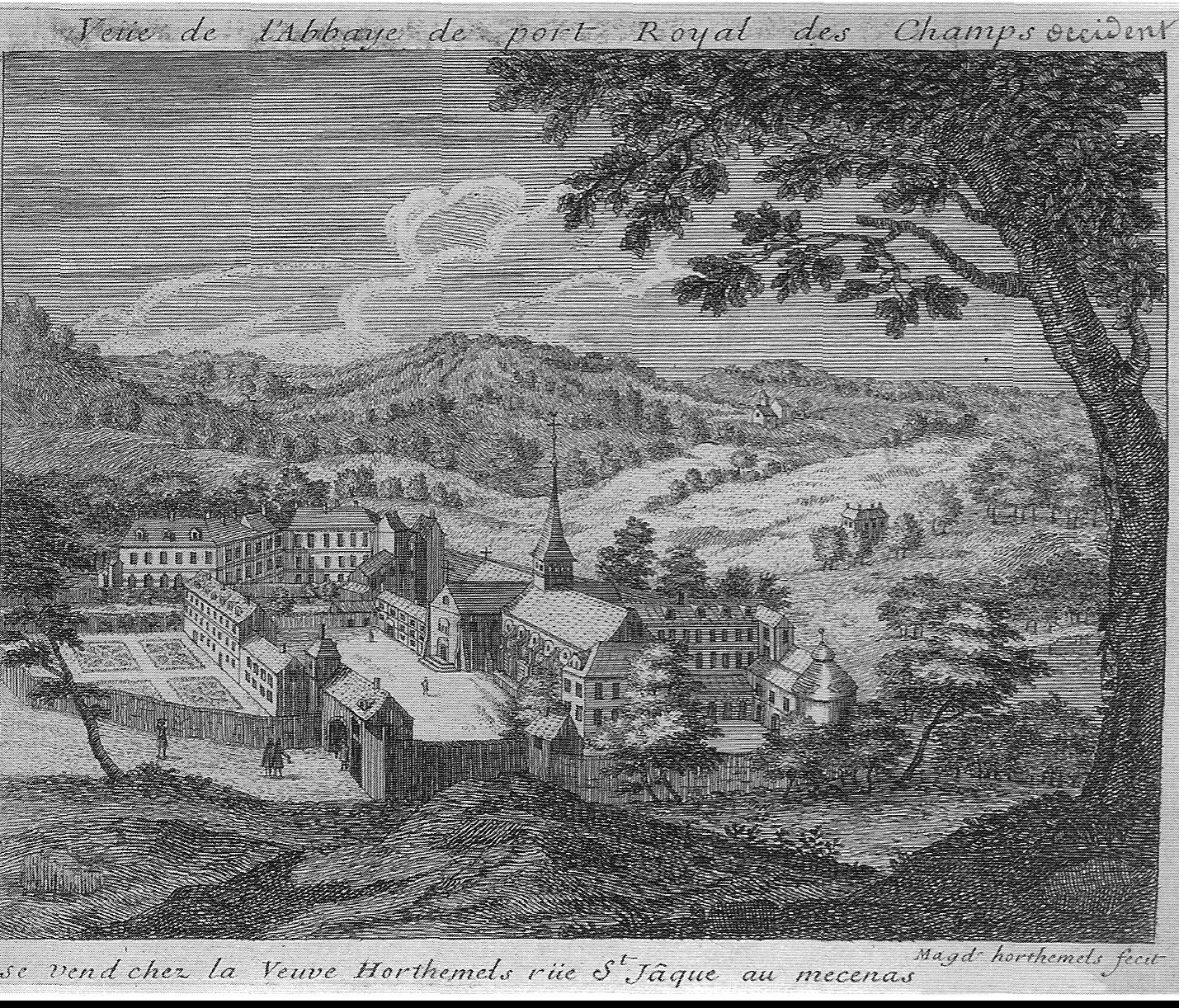
Abbey of Port-Royal-des-Champs, engraved by Cochin's mother Louise-Magdeleine Horthemels.

Cochin was born in Paris, the son of Charles-Nicolas Cochin the Elder (1688–1754), under whom he studied engraving. His mother was Louise-Magdeleine Horthemels (1686–1767), who herself was an important engraver in Paris for some fifty years.

Beyond his artistic education, Cochin taught himself Latin, English, and Italian, and he read the work of the philosopher John Locke in the original.

As well as having natural talent and academic training, Cochin benefited from good connections in the world of art. As well as both of his parents being engravers, his mother's two sisters, Marie-Nicole Horthemels (b. 1689, died after 1745) and Marie-Anne-Hyacinthe Horthemels (1682–1727), worked in the same field. Marie-Nicole was married to the portrait artist Alexis Simon Belle, while Marie-Anne-Hyacinthe was the wife of Nicolas-Henri Tardieu. Tardieu (1674–1749) was another eminent French engraver, a member of the academy from 1720, who engraved the works of masters of the Renaissance and of his own time.

The Horthemels family, originally from The Netherlands, were followers of the Dutch theologian Cornelis Jansen and had links with the Parisian abbey of Port-Royal des Champs, the centre of Jansenist thought in France.

In the 1730s, Cochin was a member of the Gobelins group which centred around Charles Parrocel.

== Career ==
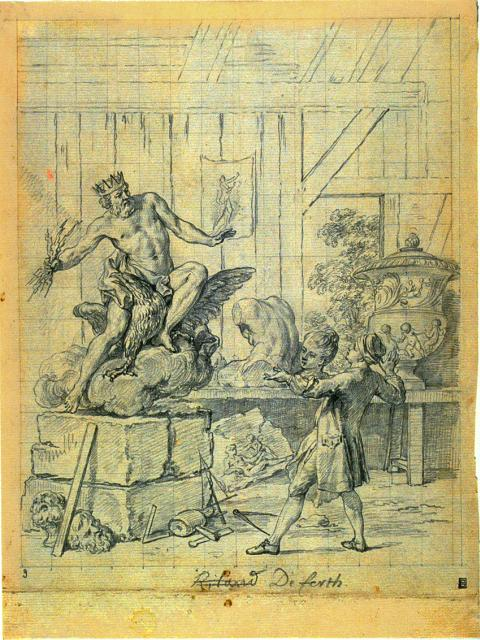
Le statuaire et la statue de Jupiter, sketch by Cochin for an illustration in Jean de la Fontaine's Fables choisies

Cochin rose quickly to success and fame. As early as 1737, he was employed by the young King Louis XV to make engravings to commemorate every birth, marriage, and funeral at the king's court, and from 1739 he was formally attached as designer and engraver to the Menus-Plaisirs du Roi, where all such ephemeral occasions were produced.

As well as being an engraver to the court, he was also a designer, a writer on art, and a portrait artist.

In 1749 Mme de Pompadour selected Cochin to accompany her brother Abel Poisson, the future marquis de Marigny, on a study tour of Italy, in the company of the architect Jacques-Germain Soufflot and the art-critic Jean-Bernard, abbé Le Blanc. Cochin, Soufflot and Marigny remained close friends on their return, when their considerable combined influence did much to bring about the triumph of Neoclassicism in France.

On his return in 1751 he was admitted a member of the Royal Academy of Painting and Sculpture, where he had been agréé since 1741. In 1752, following the death of Charles-Antoine Coypel, he was appointed as Coypel's successor as keeper of the king's drawings and given a lodging in the Louvre. From 1755 to 1770, he had the title of the King's administrator of the arts, and in this role he commissioned work from other artists, established programmes for the decoration of the king's palaces and chateaux, and granted pensions. Between 1750 and 1773, Cochin's work was directed by the Marquis de Marigny, King Louis XV's director of the Bâtiments du Roi. Cochin was effectively Marigny's academic liaison.

In 1750–1751, Cochin, with Jérôme-Charles Bellicard, accompanied Marigny on a visit to the excavations at Herculaneum. In 1753, Cochin and Bellicard published their Observations upon the Antiquities of the Town of Herculaneum, the first illustrated account of the discoveries there, which largely caused the frescoes of Herculaneum to be disregarded. Editions of the work in English were published in 1753, 1756, and 1758, and in French in 1754, 1755 and 1757.

Cochin was able to influence the artistic taste of France and was one of his country's primary leaders of taste during the eighteenth century. His years of greatest administrative influence were from 1752 to 1770.

In 1755, he became Secretary (secrétaire historiographe) of the academy, a position he still held in 1771, and for one year he was director of the Société académique des Enfants d'Apollon.

He was a frequent guest at the dinners given by Madame Geoffrin, and was said to speak brilliantly at them of painting and engraving.

Cochin saw himself as an educator and was critical of the Rococo style, whose extravagance he publicly criticised in letters in the Mercure de France He argued for technical precision and for skill in the use of natural elements. In the 1750s he also attacked the early, extreme phase of Neo-classicism known as the Goût grec, exemplified in the work of the architect Jean-François de Neufforge.

King Louis XV rewarded Cochin's talents with a patent of nobility and membership of the Order of Saint Michael and granted him a pension. However, after the death of Louis XV in 1774, Cochin fell out of royal favour, and in his later years he lived in comparative poverty.

== Works of art ==
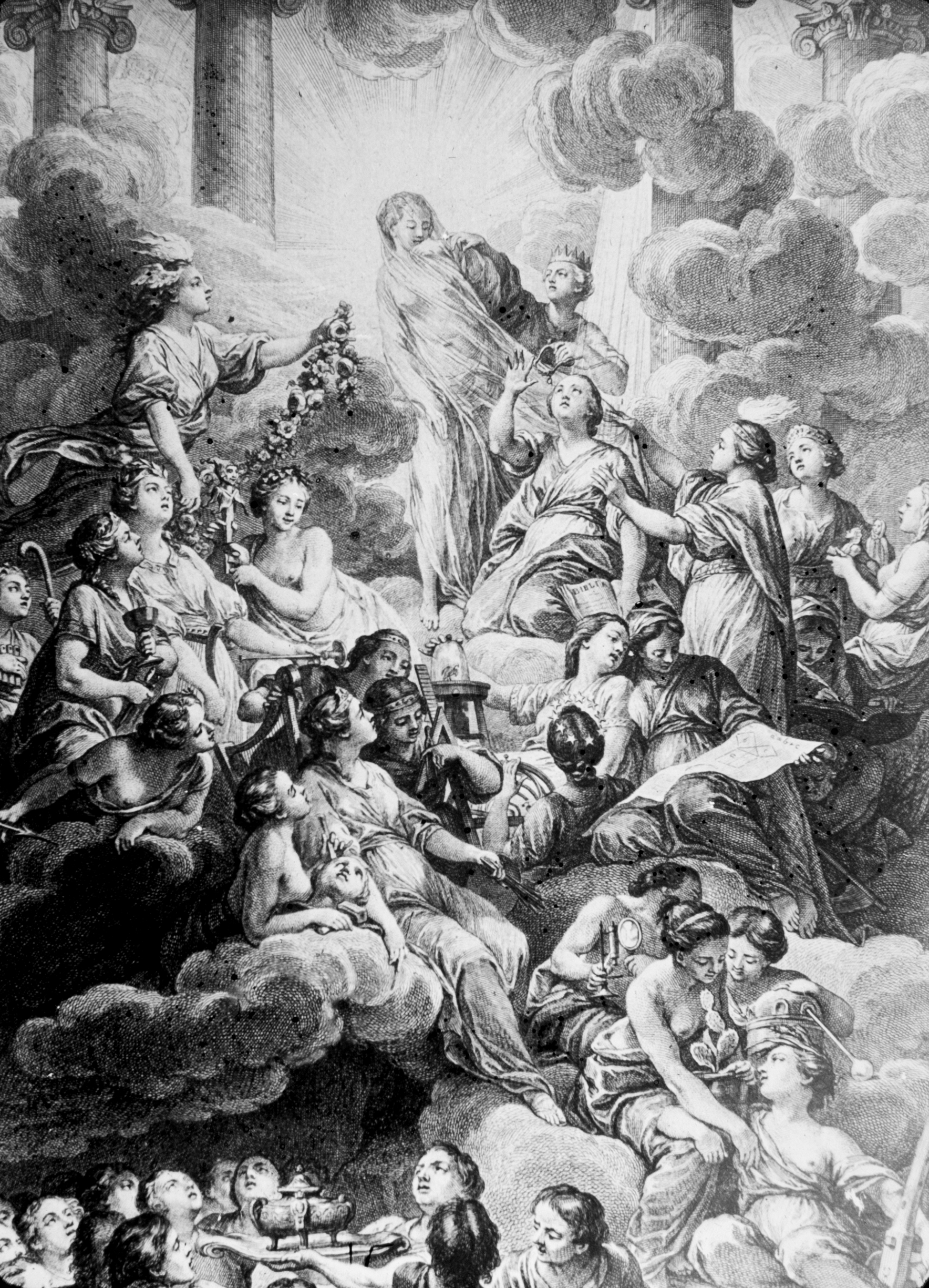
Detail of the frontispiece of the Encyclopédie, drawn by Cochin and engraved by Benoît-Louis Prévost.

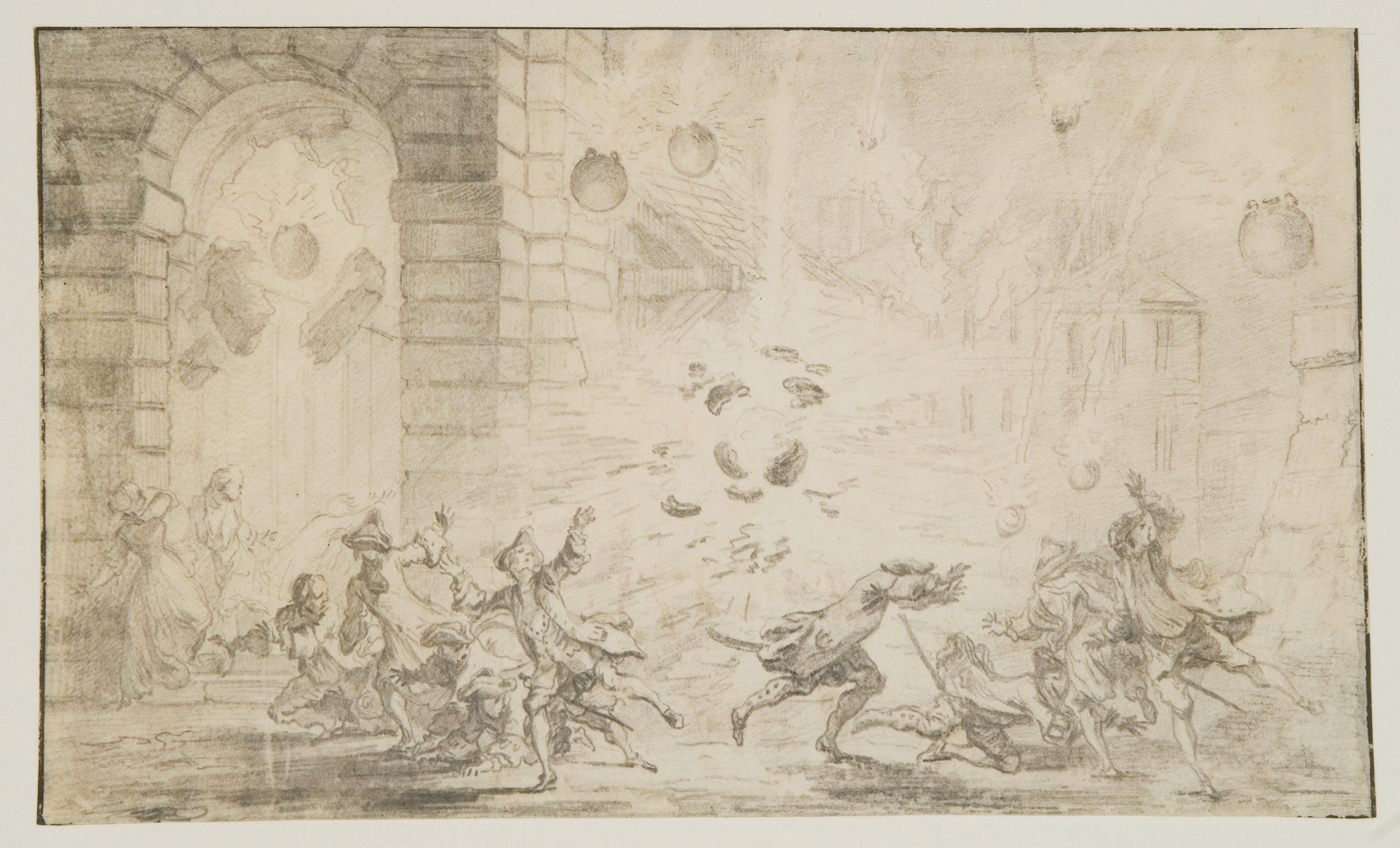
Design for a book illustration – the effect of bombs falling on a town, 1740–41 at Waddesdon Manor

More than fifteen hundred works by Cochin can be identified. They include historical subjects, book illustrations, and portraits in pencil and crayon. The richest collection of his engravings, apparently selected by himself, is in the Royal Library, now part of the Bibliothèque nationale.

Cochin's own compositions are usually rich, gracious, and speak of a man full of erudition.

A notable piece of work is his frontispiece to the 1764 edition of Diderot's Encyclopédie, entitled Lycurgue blessé dans une sédition. Of his historical work, the best known prints include The death of Hippolytus, after François de Troy, and David playing the harp before Saul. As well as his many drawings, he illustrated more than two hundred books and also designed paintings and sculptures.

With Philippe Lebas, an early master of Cochin's, he engraved sixteen plates in the series Ports of France, of which fifteen are after paintings by Vernet and one designed by himself.

More than three hundred of his portraits are listed by Christian Michel in his monumental Charles-Nicolas Cochin et l'art des Lumières (1993).

== Legacy ==
In 1912, a typeface named Cochin, in honor of the artist, was designed by Georges Peignot. The style was inspired by Cochin's engravings, however, it is not a direct copy of those presented in the prints.

== Publications ==
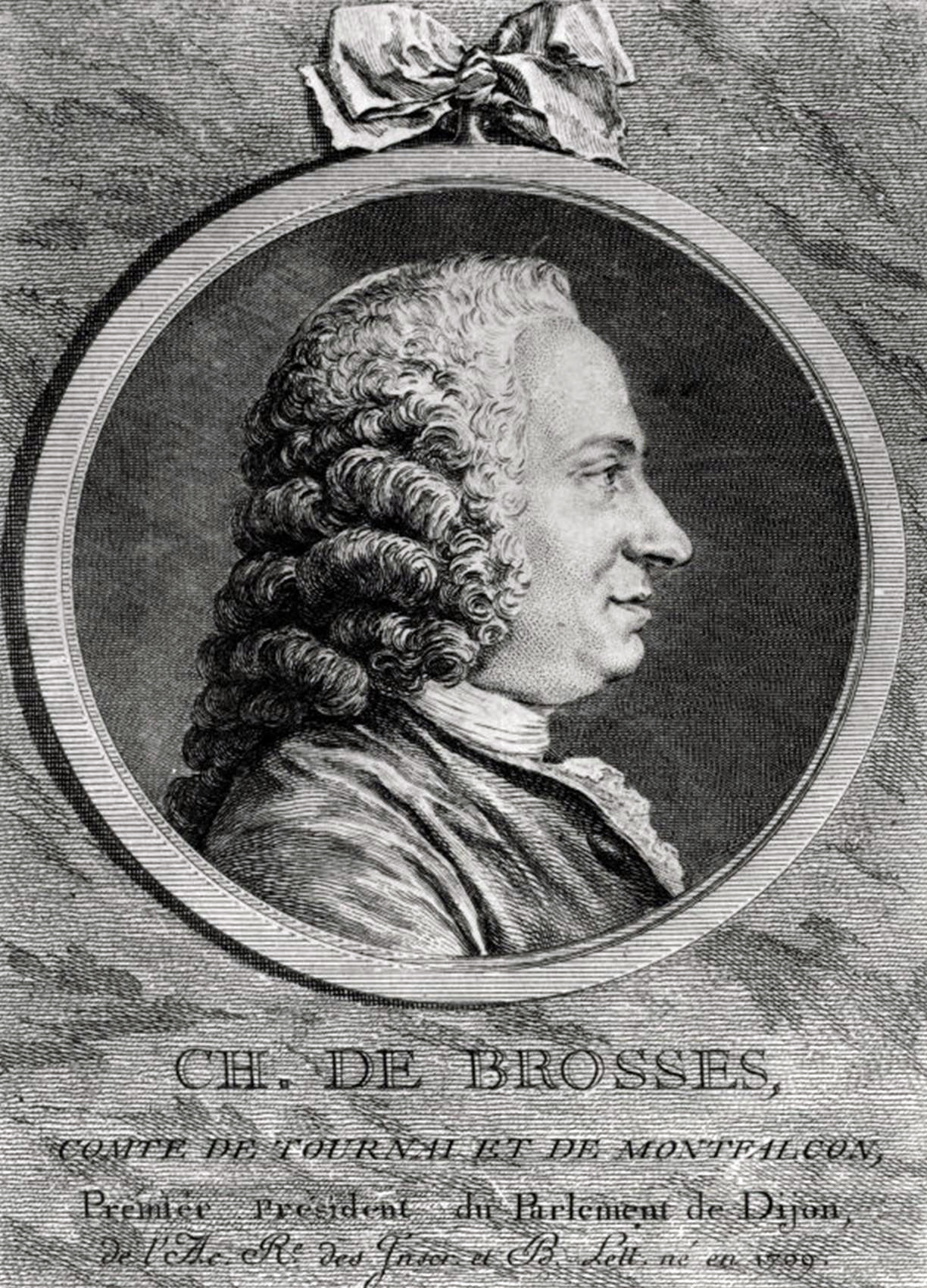
Charles de Brosses, comte de Tournay baron de Montfalcon, copper engraving by Cochin

- Cochin, Charles-Nicolas, Voyage d'Italie, ou recueil de notes sur les ouvrages de peinture et de sculpture qu'on voit dans les principales villes d'Italie (Paris, 1751, in 3 volumes)
- Cochin, Charles-Nicolas (with Bellicard, Jérôme-Charles), Observations upon the Antiquities of the Town of Herculaneum (London 1753, English edition, Paris 1754, French edition)
- Cochin, Charles-Nicolas, Recueil de quelques pièces concernant les arts, avec une dissertation sur l'effet de la lumière et des ombres relativement à la peinture (Paris, 1757, in 3 volumes)
- Cochin, Charles-Nicolas, Réflexions sur la critique des ouvrages exposés au Louvre (Paris, 1757)
- Cochin, Charles-Nicolas, Les Misotechnistes aux enfers, ou Examen critique des observations de N.D.L.G sur les arts (Amsterdam and Paris, 1763)
- Cochin, Charles-Nicolas (with Patte, Pierre, and Chaumont, chevalier de), Projet d'une salle de spectacle pour un théâtre de comédie (London and Paris, 1765, new edition Geneva, Minkoff, 1974)
- Cochin, Charles-Nicolas, Lettres sur les vies de M. Slodtz et de M. Deshays (Paris, 1765)
- Cochin, Charles-Nicolas, Lettre à une société d'amateurs prétendus (1769)
- Under the pseudonym of Jérôme, Réponse à M. Raphaël (Paris, 1769)
- Cochin, Charles-Nicolas, Les Amours rivaux, ou l'homme du monde (Paris, 1774)
- Cochin, Charles-Nicolas, Lettres sur l'Opéra (Paris, 1781)
- Cochin, Charles-Nicolas, Lettres à un jeune artiste peintre (undated)

Cochin's published and unpublished texts, including over six hundred surviving letters, and the lectures he gave at meetings of the academy, are listed by Michel.

== Bibliography ==
- Rocheblave, Samuel, Les Cochin (Paris, Librarie de l'Art, 1893),
- Rocheblave, Samuel, Charles-Nicolas Cochin, graveur et dessinateur (1715–1790) (Paris and Brussels, G. Vanoest, 1927, 110 pp, 71 plates)
- Tavernier, Ludwig, Das Problem der Naturnachahmung in den kunstkritischen Schriften Charles Nicolas Cochins (Hildesheim, Zürich, New York, 1983)
- Michel, Christian, Charles-Nicolas Cochin et le livre illustré au XVIIIe siècle: avec un catalogue raisonné des livres illustrés par Cochin 1735–1790 (Geneva, 1987)
- Michel, Christian (ed.), Le voyage d'Italie de Charles-Nicolas Cochin (1758) (Rome, École de France de Rome, 1991, 510 pp. incl. 57 illustrations)
- Michel, Christian, Charles-Nicolas Cochin et l'art des Lumières (École Française de Rome, 1993, 727 pp. incl. 69 illustrations)
- Foster, Carter E., Charles-Nicolas Cochin the Younger: The Philadelphia Portfolio in Philadelphia Museum of Art Bulletin, vol. 90, no. 381 (Summer, 1994), pp. 1–28, doi:10.2307/3795470

Michel's Charles-Nicolas Cochin et l'art des Lumières (1993) was described in The Art Bulletin by a reviewer as "the most sophisticated study of any single figure of the 18th-century European art world known to me".
