= Nicolas-Henri Tardieu =

French engraver

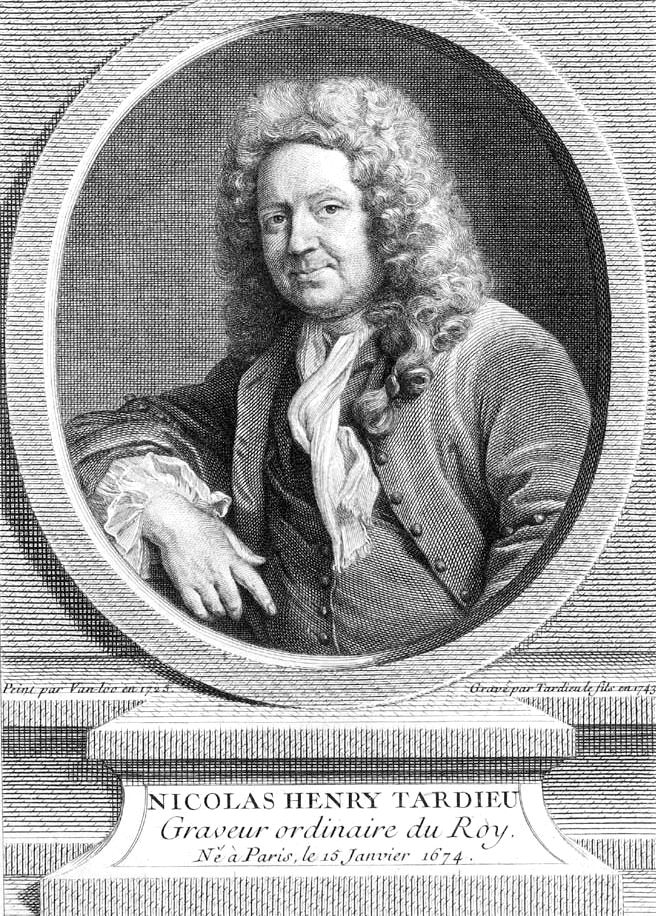
- Engraving of Nicolas-Henri Tardieu by his son Jacques-Nicolas Tardieu after a painting by Jean-Baptiste van Loo, 1743.
- Born: 18 January 1674; Paris, France
- Died: 27 January 1749 (aged 75); Paris, France
- Known for: Engraving
- Spouse(s): Louise-Françoise Aveline, Marie-Anne Horthemels

Nicolas-Henri Tardieu, called the "Tardieu the elder", (18 January 1674 - 27 January 1749) was a prominent French engraver, known for his sensitive reproductions of Antoine Watteau's paintings. He was appointed graveur du roi (King's Engraver) to King Louis XV. His second wife, Marie-Anne Horthemels, came from a family that included engravers and painters. She is known as an engraver in her own right. Nicolas-Henri and Marie-Anne Tardieu had many descendants who were noted artists, most of them engravers.

== Biography ==
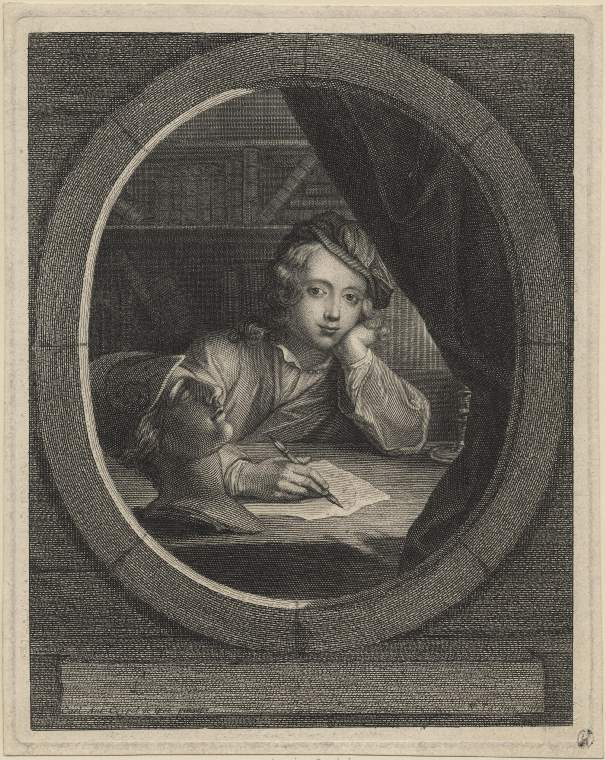
The painter Charles-Antoine Coypel

Nicolas-Henri Tardieu was born in Paris on 18 January 1674 and was baptized three days later. He was the son of Nicolas Tardieu, bourgeois de Paris, and Marie Aymiée [sic]. His father was a boilermaker, as were his two younger brothers. Possibly Nicolas-Henri used scraps of copper from his father's workshop for his early engravings. He was a student of Pierre Lepautre, Gérard Audran and Benoit Audran. Tardieu married Louise-Françoise Aveline, daughter of Jean Aveline and a relative of the engraver Pierre Aveline, on 1 September 1706 in the church of Saint-Jacques-du-Haut-Pas. Louise-Françoise was the widow of Laurent Baron, the commissioner of the oratory. Louise had two children from her first marriage, and had just one with Tardieu, Denis, born on 31 August 1707. She died on 18 November 1708.

On 20 October 1712 Tardieu married again, to Marie-Anne Horthemels. She was the widow of the pastry-maker Germain Le Coq, who had worked for King Louis XIV (1638–1715) and for Louis's granddaughter-in-law the Duchess of Burgundy. Marie-Anne was one of three daughters of the Dutch bookseller Daniel Horthemels. Her sister Louise-Magdeleine Horthemels was an active reproductive engraver who married Charles-Nicolas Cochin, graveur du roi. Her other sister married Alexis Simon Belle, peintre ordinaire du roi. His second wife had a talent for engraving, and is known for her portraits of Cardinal de Bissy, Cardinal de Rohan and the Regent Philippe II, Duke of Orléans. She died on 24 March 1727.

Tardieu was accredited to the Academy on 29 October 1712. He was received as a member of the Royal Academy and graveur du roi (official engraver to King Louis XV) on 29 November 1720 for his "Engraved portrait of the Duke of Antin" (Louis Antoine de Pardaillan de Gondrin), after a painting by Hyacinthe Rigaud. As one of the most prominent engravers of his time, Tardieu was commissioned to engrave plates for several major publications. He made engravings for the Crozat Collection and the Galerie de Versailles.

Tardieu died on 27 January 1749 at his house on the Rue Saint-Jacques in Paris and was buried the next day. He was survived by his brother, Claude Tardieu, and his son, Jacques-Nicolas Tardieu.

== Legacy ==
Tardieu had four sons, each of whom passed on the tradition of engraving or other arts to their descendants. He had taught his son Jacques-Nicolas Tardieu (1718-1759), also a designer and engraver, who was appointed graveur ordinaire du roi. Tardieu also taught engraving to his nephew, Pierre François Tardieu (c.1711 - 1774). The engraver Bernard Baron (1700-1762) was another of his pupils who gained distinction in his profession. Laurent Cars and Jacques-Philippe Le Bas were also pupils, later to be teachers themselves. His grandson Jean-Charles Tardieu became a well-known painter. The last of the line of "clever engravers" that he founded died in 1844.

Jean-Baptiste van Loo painted Tardieu's portrait, which was placed in the galleries of Versailles.

== Work ==
Of at least eight engravers by the name of Tardieu, Nicolas-Henri was the most notable, one of the most prominent engravers in France for his versatile use of point and graver. He was author of many engravings of the highest quality. Tardieu held true to the principles of his master, Gérard Audran. He was an opponent of the fashionable trend towards less serious subjects, and attempted to pass on his traditionalist views to his pupils. Tardieu engraved several of Watteau's paintings. His version of Champs Elysées and Embarcation for Cythera are excellent interpretations of Watteau's work as etchings. Tardieu had an extraordinary ability to retain the "silvery" atmosphere of Watteau's paintings in his engravings. Tardieu also engraved copies of many of the Mays of Notre Dame, creating vital records for some of the originals that are now lost.

=== Prints ===
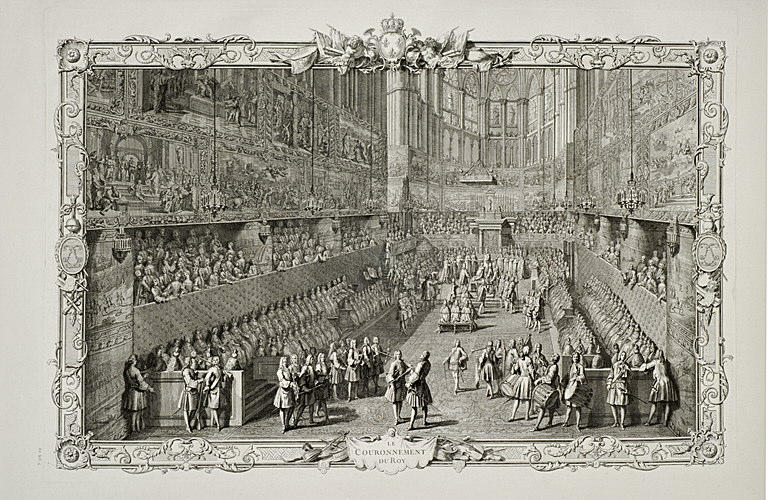
Le Couronnement du Roi, after a painting by Pierre Dulin. The engraving was made soon after 25 October 1722 from a tableau in the series Le Sacre de Louis XV.

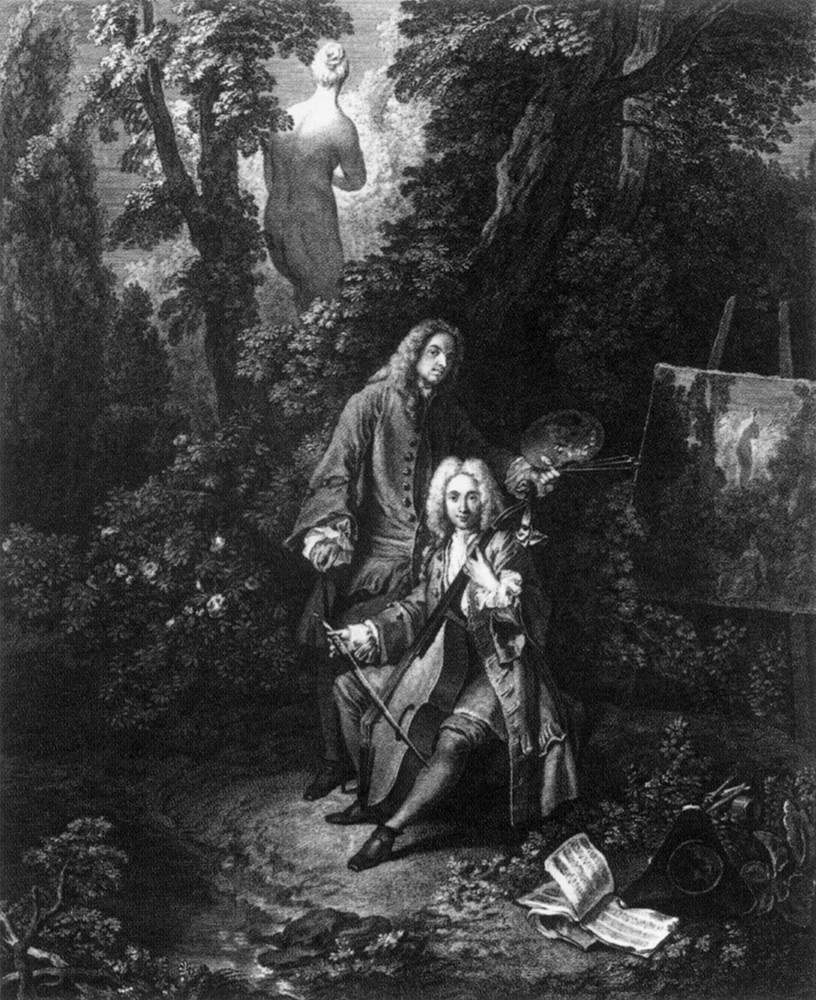
Watteau et son ami Monsieur de Jullienne, 1731.

Some of his best prints include:

Portraits

- Louis-Antoine, Duke D'Antin after Rigaud, engraved for his reception plate at the Academy in 1720
- Jean Soanen, Bishop of Senez, made from the life 1716
- An embematical Subject, representing the principal qualifications of a perfect Minister: Secrecy, Fortitude and Prudence after Eustache Le Sueur

Classical subjects

- Embarkation for Cythera (L'Embarquement pour Cythère) after Antoine Watteau
- Alexander's Battles (set) after Charles Le Brun
- Four subjects of Roman history, in the form of friezes after Rinaldo Mantovano
- Jupiter and Alemene after Giulio Romano
- Apollo and Daphne after Charles-Antoine Coypel
- The Wrath of Achilles after Antoine Coypel
- The Parting of Hector and Andromache after Antoine Coypel
- Vulcan presenting to Venus Armour for Aeneas after Antoine Coypel
- Venus soliciting Jupiter in favour of Aeneas after Antoine Coypel
- Juno directing Aeolus to raise a Tempest against the Fleet of Aeneas after Antoine Coypel

Religious subjects

- The Annunciation after Carlo Maratta
- The Holy Family, with Angels presenting Flowers and Fruit after Andrea di Aloigi
- Adam and Eve after Domenichino
- The Scourging of Christ after Charles Le Brun
- The Crucifixion after Charles Le Brun
- Christ and the Woman of Samaria after Nicolas Bertin
- Christ appearing to Mary Magdalene (Apparition de Jésus à Madeleine) after Nicolas Bertin
- The Martyrdom of St. Peter after Sébastien Bourdon
- The Crucifixion after Joseph Parrocel
- The Conception after Antoine Coypel

Other works

Other works that have been preserved include:

- Gravures, 1738
- Saint Jérôme dans la caverne, 1741, after the painting by Pierre Dulin in the chapel of l’abbé Bignon at Filles Saint-Thomas
- Portrait du R. P. Pollard, prêtre de l’Oratoire 1742, drawn and engraved by the same artist
- La croix qui apparait dans le ciel à l’empereur Constantin lorsqu’il se préparait à déclarer la guerre au tyran Maxence (from the cabinet of the duc d’Orléans)
- Baptême de Constantin
- Double mariage de Constantin Chlorus, père de Constantin et de Maximien Galère César, 1743
- La Ville de Rome reçoit la couronne de l’Empire des mains de la Victoire à l’entrée de Constantin
- Entrevue de Constantin et de Crispe, son fils, à Byzance
- La Bataille de Constantin contre Maxence, 1745
- La Défaite de Maxence et sa chute dans le Tibre
- Vue de la ville de Beauvais, after a pastel by Jean-Baptiste Oudry, 1747
- Vue de l’abbaye de Poissy du côté de la forêt de Saint-Germain, 1748, after a pastel by Oudry
- Un plafond du Palais-Royal, after Charles-Antoine Coypel
- Recueil historié des hommes illustres d’Angleterre, after Italian and French drawings
- Le Sacre de Louis XV

=== Gallery ===
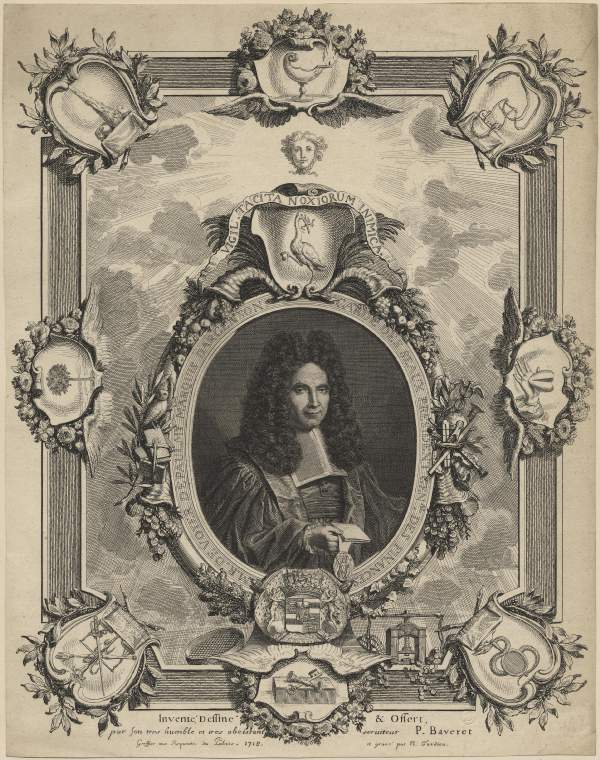
Marc-René de Voyer de Paulmy, 1st marquis d'Argenson.

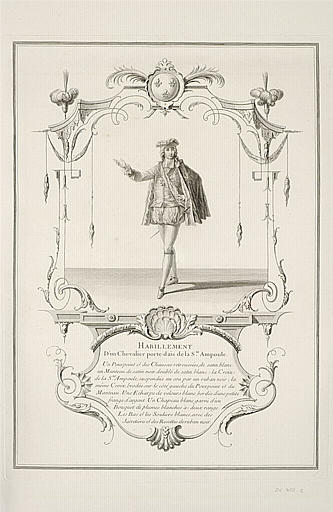
Habillement d'un chevalier porte-dais de la Sainte Ampoule

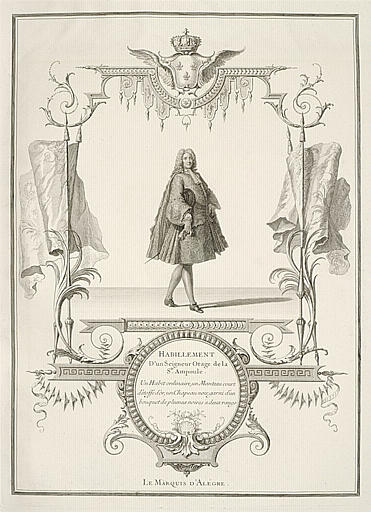
Habillement d'un Seigneur Otage de la Sainte Ampoule, Le Marquis d'Alégre

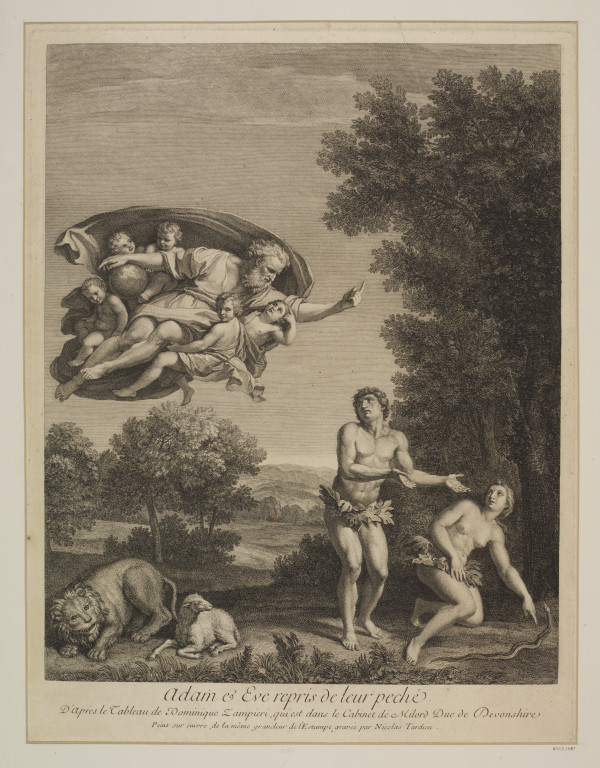
Adam and Eve; the Almighty seen above expelling them from Paradise. Victoria and Albert Museum. From the picture by Domenichino in the Devonshire Gallery.

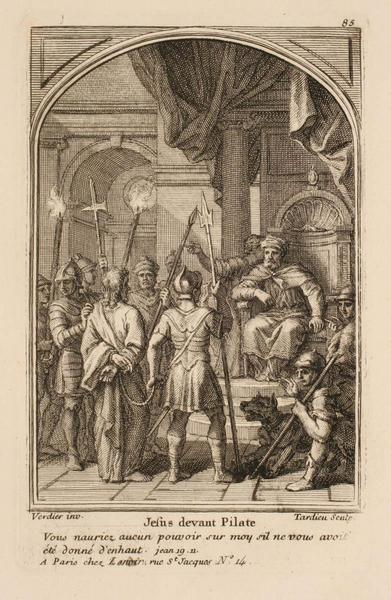
Jesus before Pontius Pilate after a work by François-Alexandre Verdier

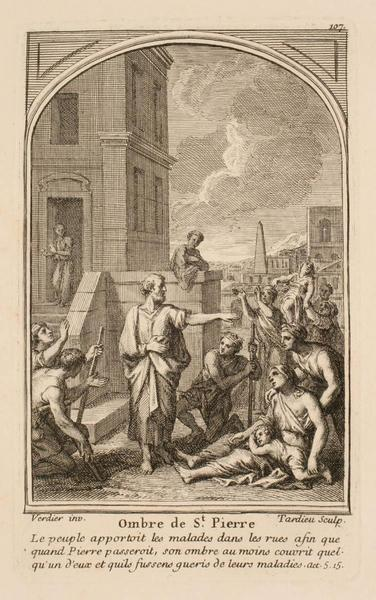
L'ombre de saint Pierre. After a work by François-Alexandre Verdier. Nancy, France: Musée des beaux-arts

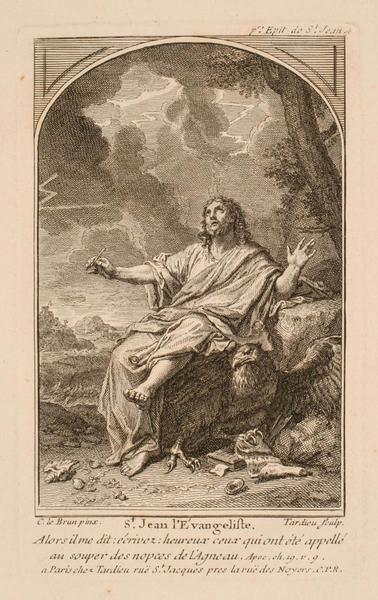
Les évangélistes: Saint Jean. After a work by Charles Lebrun. Nancy: Musée des beaux-arts

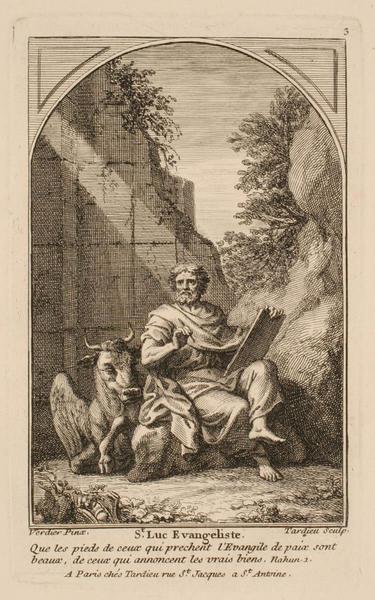
Les évangélistes: Saint Luc. After a work by François-Alexandre Verdier. Nancy: Musée des beaux-arts

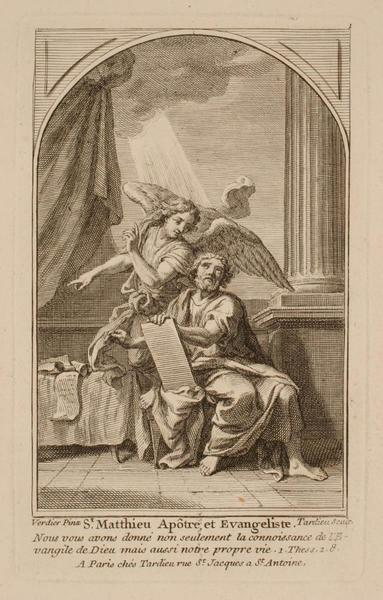
Les évangélistes: Saint Matthieu. After a work by François-Alexandre Verdier. Nancy: Musée des beaux-arts
