= Alexis Simon Belle =

French painter (1674–1734)

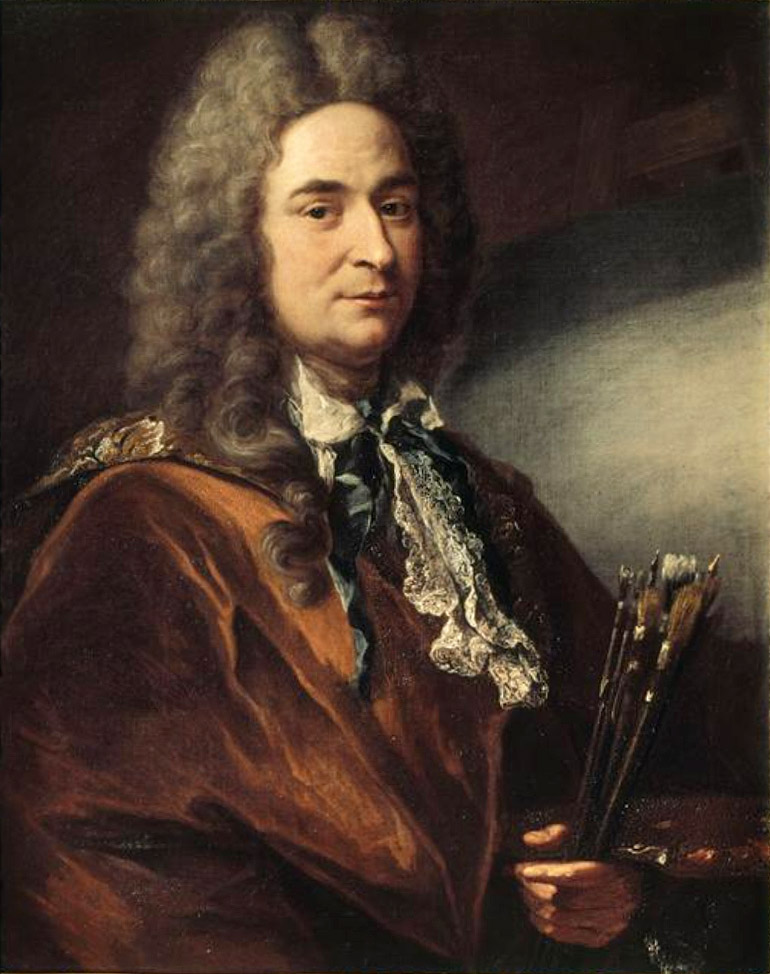
- Self-portrait, 1700–1725
- Born: Alexis Simon Belle; 12 January 1674; Paris, France
- Died: 21 November 1734 (aged 60); Paris, France
- Education: François de Troy
- Known for: Painter
- Patrons: Courts of James II of England and James Francis Edward Stuart in exile, French court

Alexis Simon Belle (12 January 1674 – 21 November 1734) was a French painter who specialised in portrait painting who is best known for his portraits of the French and Jacobite nobility. As a portrait artist, Belle's style followed that of his master François de Troy, Hyacinthe Rigaud, and Nicolas de Largillière. He was the master of the painter Jacques Aved (1702–1766).

== Biography ==
=== Early years ===
Belle was born in Paris, the second child and only son of Jean-Baptiste Belle (born before 1642, died 1703), also a painter, and of Anne his wife (died 1705).

Belle's birth and baptism are recorded in the parish register of the church of Saint-Sulpice, Paris, and quoted in Eugène Piot's Le Cabinet de l'amateur for the years 1861 and 1862:

The 17th day of January 1674 was baptized Simon-Alexis, son of Jean Belle, master painter, and of Anne de Champs his wife, the godfather Simon-Alexis Sourdeval, son of Guillaume Sourdeval; the godmother Marie Mercier, daughter of Louis Mercier. The godmother declared she could not sign. [Signed] Louis Sourdeval, Jean Belle.

Belle studied first under his father, then continued his training in the studio of François de Troy (1645/46-1730), a painter at the court of King James II in exile at Saint-Germain-en-Laye. He began to produce work at Saint-Germain in the years 1698 to 1701. This was a period of peace between France and Great Britain, and Jacobites could cross the English Channel carrying portraits of James Edward Stuart (who at his father's death in 1701 became the Jacobite claimant to the British throne) and his sister Princess Louisa Maria. Troy was then James II's only court painter and needed the help of Belle, his best student, to produce all the portraits ordered from him.

In August 1700, Belle won the Prix de Rome, but went on working at Saint-Germain instead of travelling to Italy.

=== Court painter ===
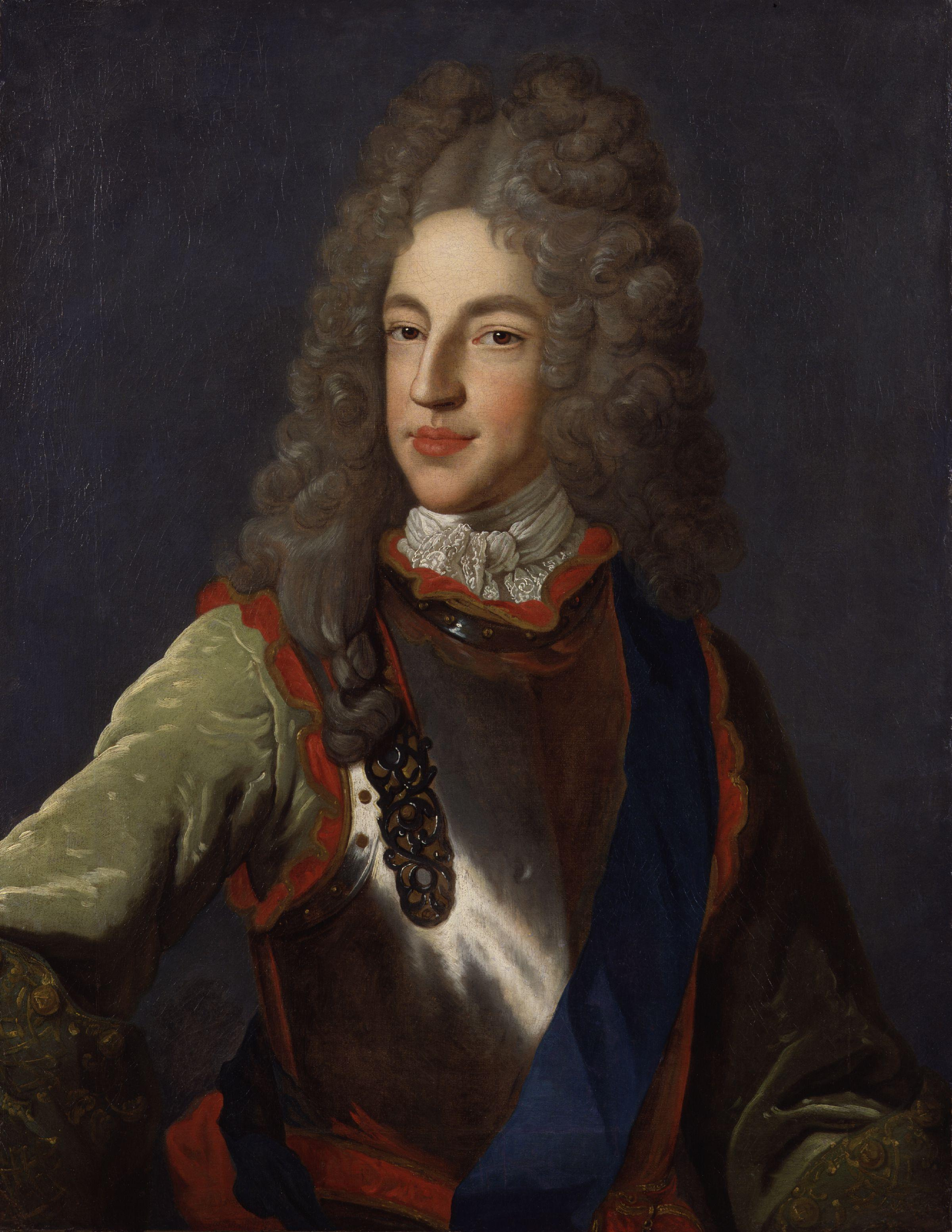
Belle's painting of Jacobite pretender James Francis Edward Stuart in armor

On 12 November 1701, Belle married the miniature painter Anne Chéron (c. 1663–1718), when he was described as peintre ordinaire du Roy d'Angleterre (painter in ordinary to the King of England). As King James II had died a few weeks before, this was a reference to his son James Edward, who had been proclaimed king of England, Scotland and Ireland by King Louis XIV.

Belle became the principal painter to the Jacobite court, where he and his wife settled and worked. He gained an important commission for the Jacobite Winifred, Lady Strickland in 1703 which led to other work. After war broke out again between Great Britain and France in 1702, their portraits of James Edward Stuart ('The Old Pretender') and his sister the Princess Royal continued to be smuggled across the Channel. Belle did other work for members of the court and for the English Augustinian convent in Paris. Several copies exist of his portrait of James Edward Stuart in armour and standing beside the English Channel, on which there are warships, pointing towards the cliffs of Dover.

Belle's most famous portrait of James Edward Stuart dates from 1712, just before he left Saint Germain for Lorraine, and shows him in a tent in a military outfit. This became the standard image of the Old Pretender and was much copied. In an engraving of the painting by François Chéreau, Belle is described as peintre de S. M. Brit. (painter to His Britannic Majesty). In 1713, Chéreau also engraved a portrait by Belle of Princess Louisa Maria (who had died in 1712) which is now in Sizergh Castle, Cumbria.

After the Pretender had left Saint Germain, Belle stayed there and painted some of the diplomats connected with the Treaty of Utrecht. However, in 1714 he joined James Edward's new court at Bar-le-Duc.

During the years 1716 to 1719, Belle received many commissions from Jacobites in exile after the unsuccessful rising of 1715. By then, the Old Pretender was himself living in Italy.

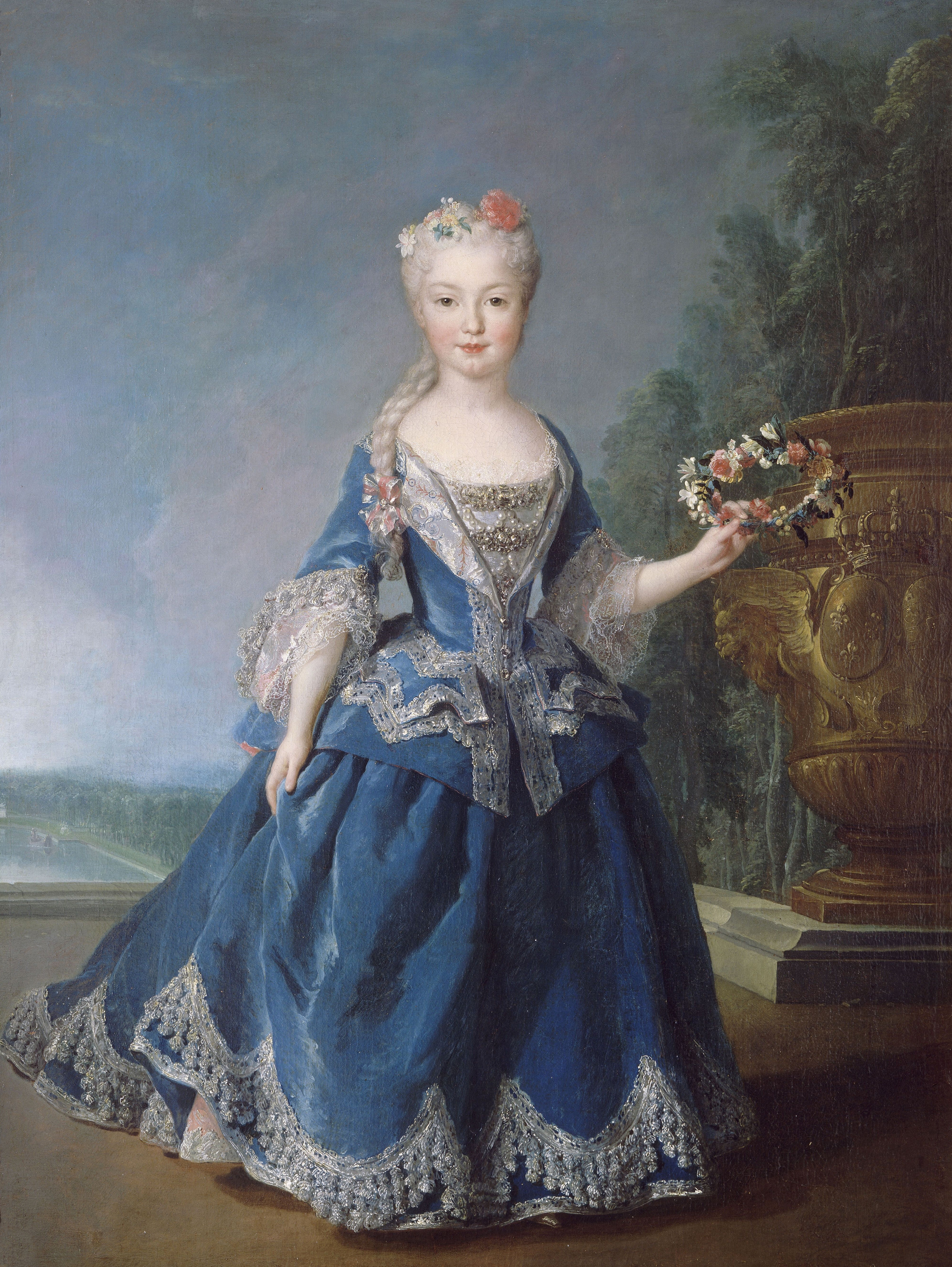
Mariana Victoria of Spain, fiancée of Louis XV, later Queen of Portugal

During the 1720s, Belle's work was increasingly for the French nobility. He painted the young King Louis XV, and much of his work was engraved, showing that he had by then a high status in France. He painted Louis XV's one-time fiancée Mariana Victoria of Spain, whom he later did not marry; he worked also for Jacobites in France, and as late as 1724 signed a portrait of Marie-Charlotte Sobieska (James Edward Stuart's sister-in-law) pictor regis Britann (painter to the king of Britain). In 1731, Belle made two copies of portraits by David of James Edward Stuart's two young sons, Princes Charles Edward Stuart and Henry Benedict Stuart.

Belle's first wife, Anne Chéron, died in April 1718. On 12 January 1722 he married as his second wife the engraver Marie-Nicolle Horthemels (born 1689, died after 1745), herself a painter and engraver. Together, they had two sons, born in 1722 and 1726, and a daughter born in 1730. With his new wife, Belle lived both among the remaining Jacobites at Saint Germain, where he owned property, and in Paris in the rue du Four.

His second wife's sister Louise-Magdeleine Horthemels (1686–1767) was an important engraver in Paris for some fifty years and was the mother of the designer, engraver, and art critic Charles-Nicolas Cochin (1715–1790). Another of his wife's sisters, Marie-Anne-Hyacinthe Horthemels (1682–1727), worked in the same field and was the wife of Nicolas-Henri Tardieu (1674–1749), an engraver who was a member of the Royal Academy of Painting and Sculpture. The Horthemels family, originally from the Netherlands, were followers of the Dutch theologian Cornelis Jansen and had links with the Parisian abbey of Port-Royal des Champs, the centre of Jansenist thought in France.

Belle and his wife Marie-Nicole were the parents of Clément-Louis-Marie-Anne Belle (1722–1806), a French painter and tapestry designer. The parish register of Saint Sulpice goes into considerable detail about Clément-Louis's baptism:

On Monday, 7 December 1722 was baptized Clément-Louis-Marie-Anne, born 16 November last, son of Alexis-Simon Belle, painter to the king in his Royal Academy, and of Marie-Nicole Hortemels his wife, inhabitants of the rue du Four; the godfather the very high and very mighty lord Louis-Marie Daumont, duke of Villequier, first Gentleman of the Bedchamber to the King, the godmother the very high and very mighty lady Anne-Marie Maxuel, daughter of the very high and very mighty lord milord the Earl of Nisdel and of the very high and very mighty Winitride Herbet de Montgomery, his wife; the father present. [Signed] Anne Maxuel, Daumont, duc de Villequier, Marie Herbet de Ponis, M. E. de Rieu de Ferolle, Belle, Longuet de Gergy, curé of Saint-Sulpice.

Those named are evidently the Jacobite peer William Maxwell, 5th Earl of Nithsdale (c. 1682–1744), his wife Winifred Herbert (c. 1690–1749), who had arranged her husband's escape from the Tower of London in 1716, and their daughter Lady Anne Maxwell (1716–1735). Remarkably, the godmother was only six years old. 'Herbet de Ponis' is an error, as Winifred Herbert was the daughter of Lord Powis.

=== Death ===
When Belle died in 1734, he was described as "painter to the king in his Royal Academy of Painting and Sculpture, comptroller of clergy stipends and comptroller of poultry", so his royal connections had evidently led to offices of profit under the crown.

Belle died at Paris in 1734. His funeral is again recorded in some detail in the parish register of the church of Saint-Sulpice, Paris, as quoted in Eugène Piot's Le Cabinet de l'amateur. This states that Belle was buried on 22 November 1734. Apart from describing him as painter to the king in the Royal Academy of Painting and Sculpture, comptroller of clergy stipends and of poultry, the register entry says that Belle was the husband of Marie-Nicole Hortemels and had died at his house in the rue du Four on the previous day, 21 November. His age is given as "about 60 years, 10 months, 8 days", and it is also recorded that the funeral was attended by Clément Louis Marie Anne Belle and "N. Belle, privately baptized, aged 7 years", sons, and by "Fréderic-Eustache-Auguste Hortemels, copperplate engraver, Denis Hortemels, bookseller, Nicolas Tardien and Charles-Nicolas Cochin, engravers to the king, both brothers-in law to the deceased".

Belle's son Clément-Louis became a history painter. Many of Belle’s relatives and descendants were involved with royal family, most notably Miss A Bell who was lady-in-waiting to Queen Alexandra when she was just Princess of Wales, she and her sisters were mistresses to the then Princes of Wales. When he died in 1806, he was described as "Rector of the Special School of Painting, Sculpture, Architecture and Engraving, and Professor of Design to the Imperial Manufactury of Gobelins".

== Works ==
Belle was primarily a portrait artist. His work includes:

- Allegorical portrait of Prince James Francis Edward Stuart and his sister Princess Louisa Maria Theresa, showing the prince as a guardian angel leading his sister under the gaze of cherubim (1699), now in the Royal Collection
- Queen Mary of Modena, c. 1699, now at Sizergh Castle, Cumbria.
- Princess Louisa Maria Theresa Stuart, 1704
- Prince James Francis Edward Stuart, c.1700–1705 (attributed)
- James Francis Edward Stuart, showing the Prince in armour and standing beside the English Channel, on which there are several warships, pointing towards the cliffs of Dover, attended by a page in Polish costume (1703, now in the Collège des Ecossais, Paris)
- Henry St John, 1st Viscount Bolingbroke, about 1712
- James Francis Edward Stuart, 1712
- James Francis Edward Stuart in the robes of a knight of the Garter, c. 1714, portrait now lost but known through an engraving by Marie-Nicolle Horthemels
- Elisabeth-Charlotte and her son, double portrait of Élisabeth Charlotte of Orléans and Francis I, Holy Roman Emperor, dated 1722, now at the Château de Lunéville
- John Law, between 1715 and 1720 (attributed)
- Louis François I de Bourbon, prince de Conti
- François de Troy (1645–1730), oil on canvas, first quarter of 18th century, in the Musée national du château et des Trianons at the Palace of Versailles
- Antoine Crozat, marquis du Chatel (1655–1738), oil on canvas, first quarter of 18th century, in the Musée national du château et des Trianons at the Palace of Versailles (attributed)
- Alexis Simon Belle, self portrait, oil on canvas, first quarter of 18th century, in the Musée national du château et des Trianons at the Palace of Versailles
- Marie-Charlotte Sobieska, sister-in-law of James Francis Edward Stuart, 1724
- Charles Gabriel de Belsunce, marquis de Castelmoron, Lieutenant Général (1681–1739), oil on canvas, first half of 18th century, in the Musée national du château et des Trianons at the Palace of Versailles

== Gallery ==
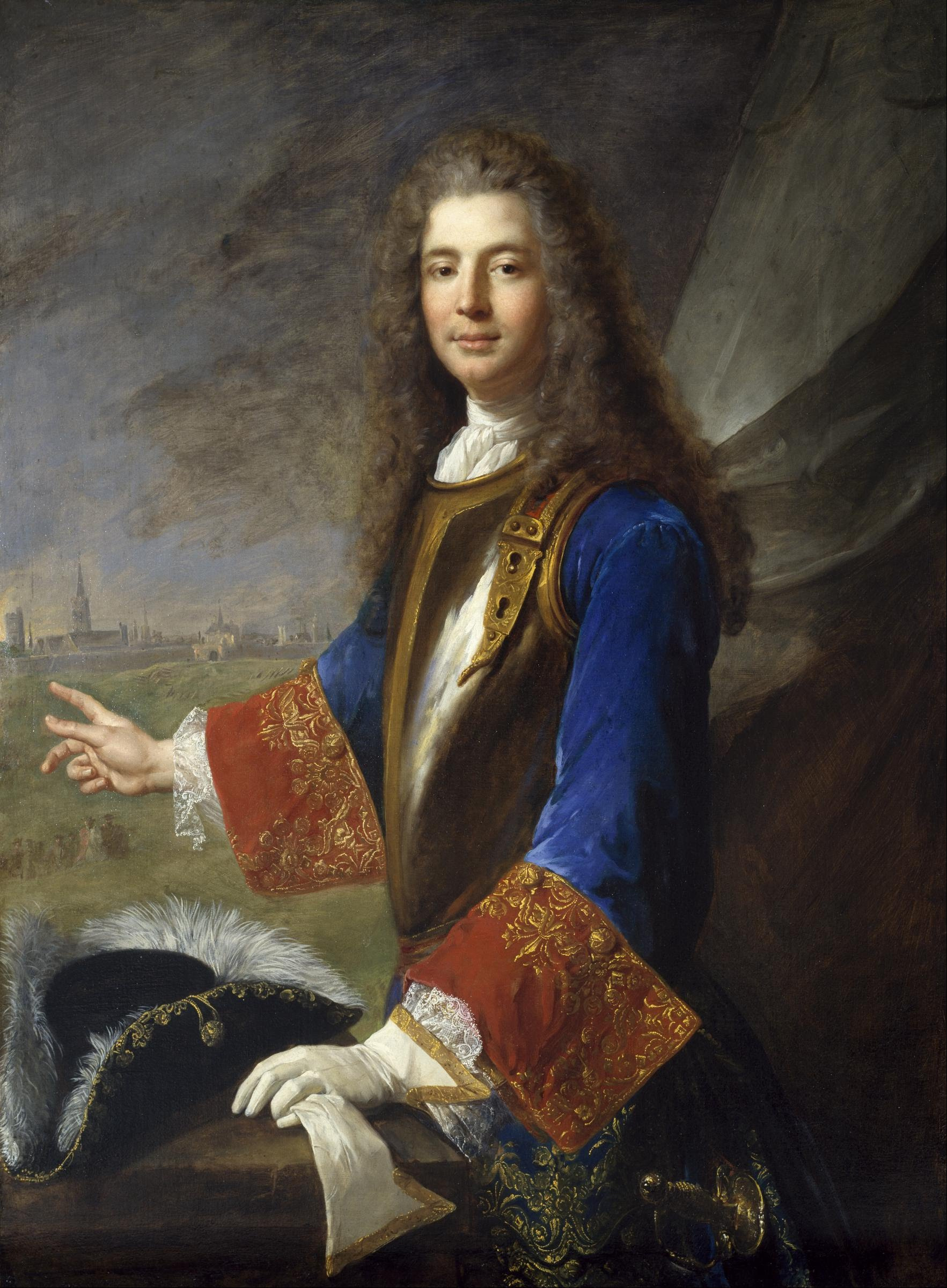
Portrait by Alexis Simon Belle of Charles-François-Marie de Custine, Chevalier de Wiltz

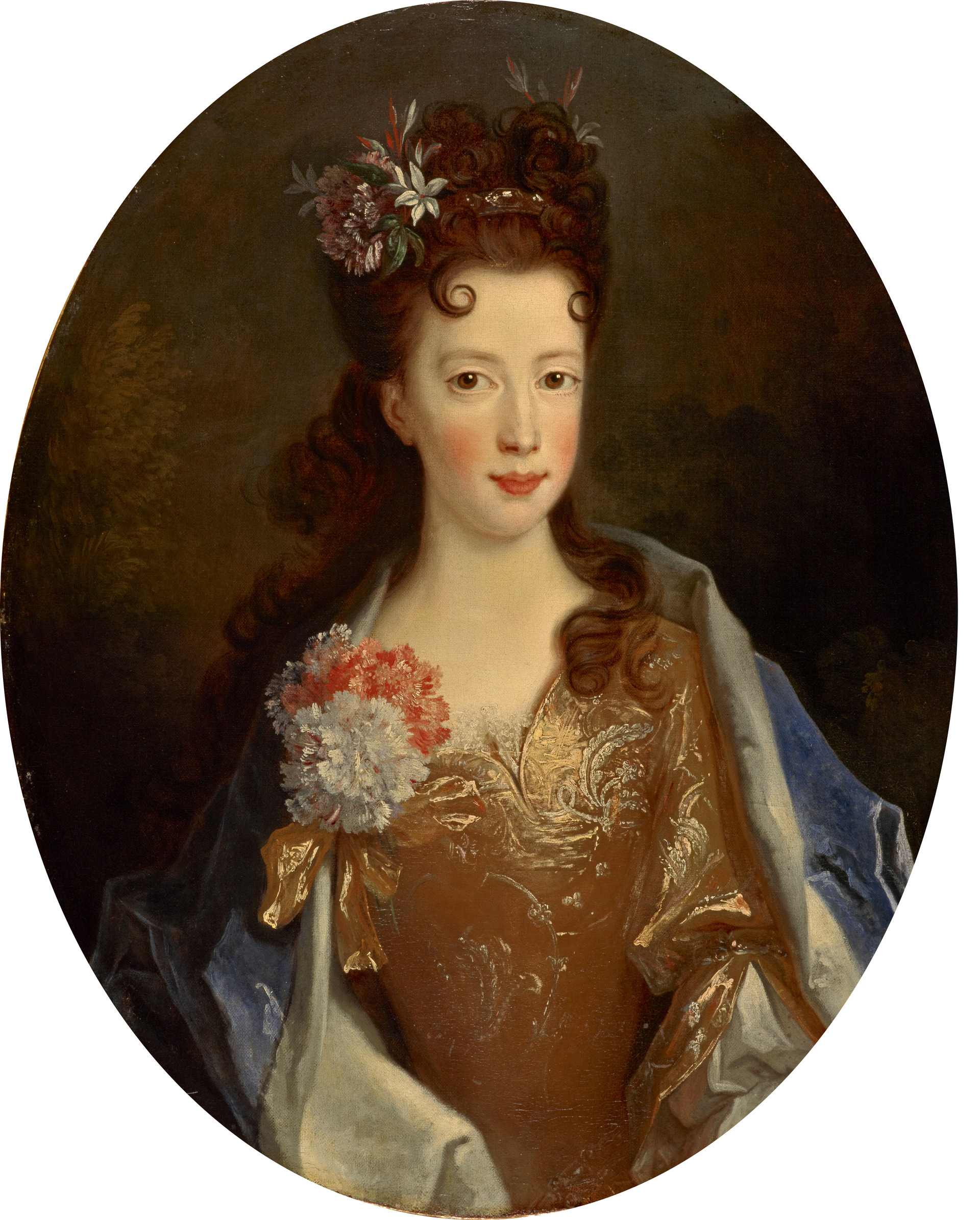
Portrait by Belle of Princess Louisa Maria Teresa Stuart, 1704

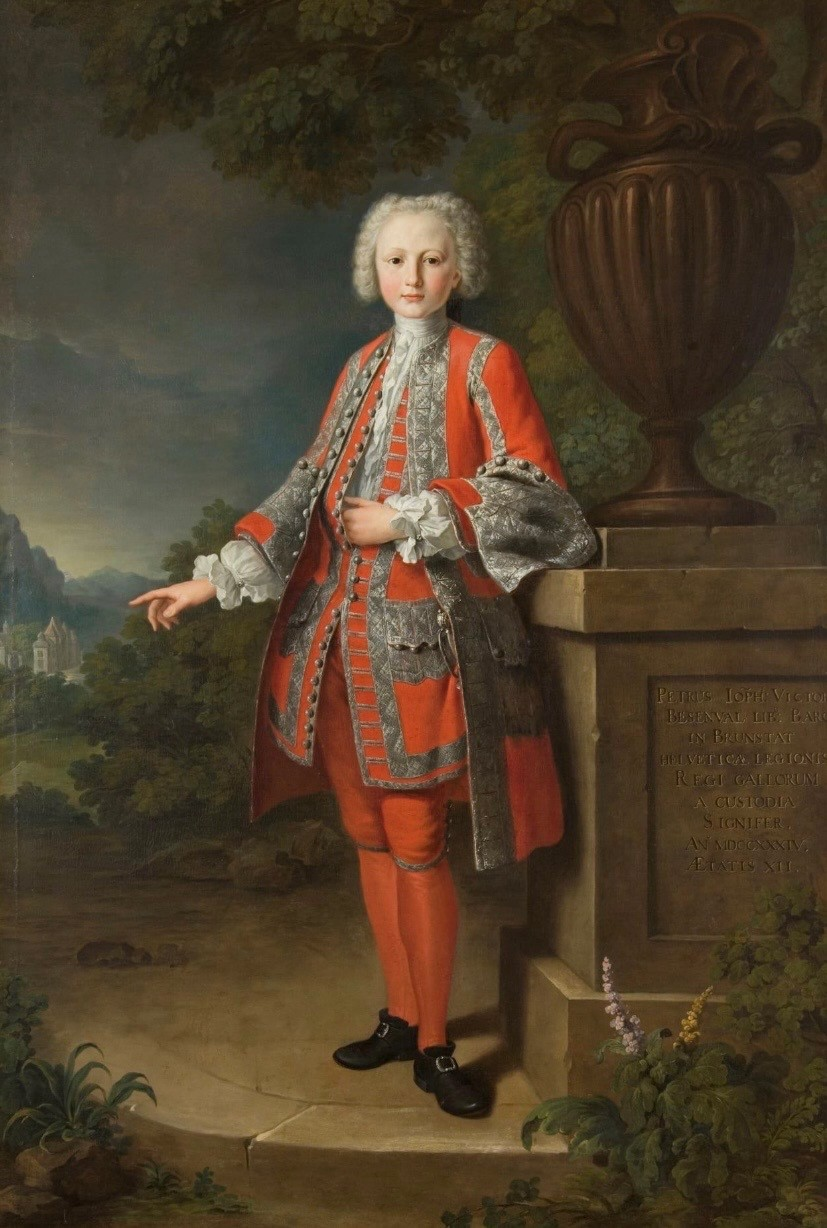
Pierre Victor de Besenval as the Ensign of the Swiss Guards Regiment, portrayed by Alexis Simon Belle in 1734 at the age of twelve

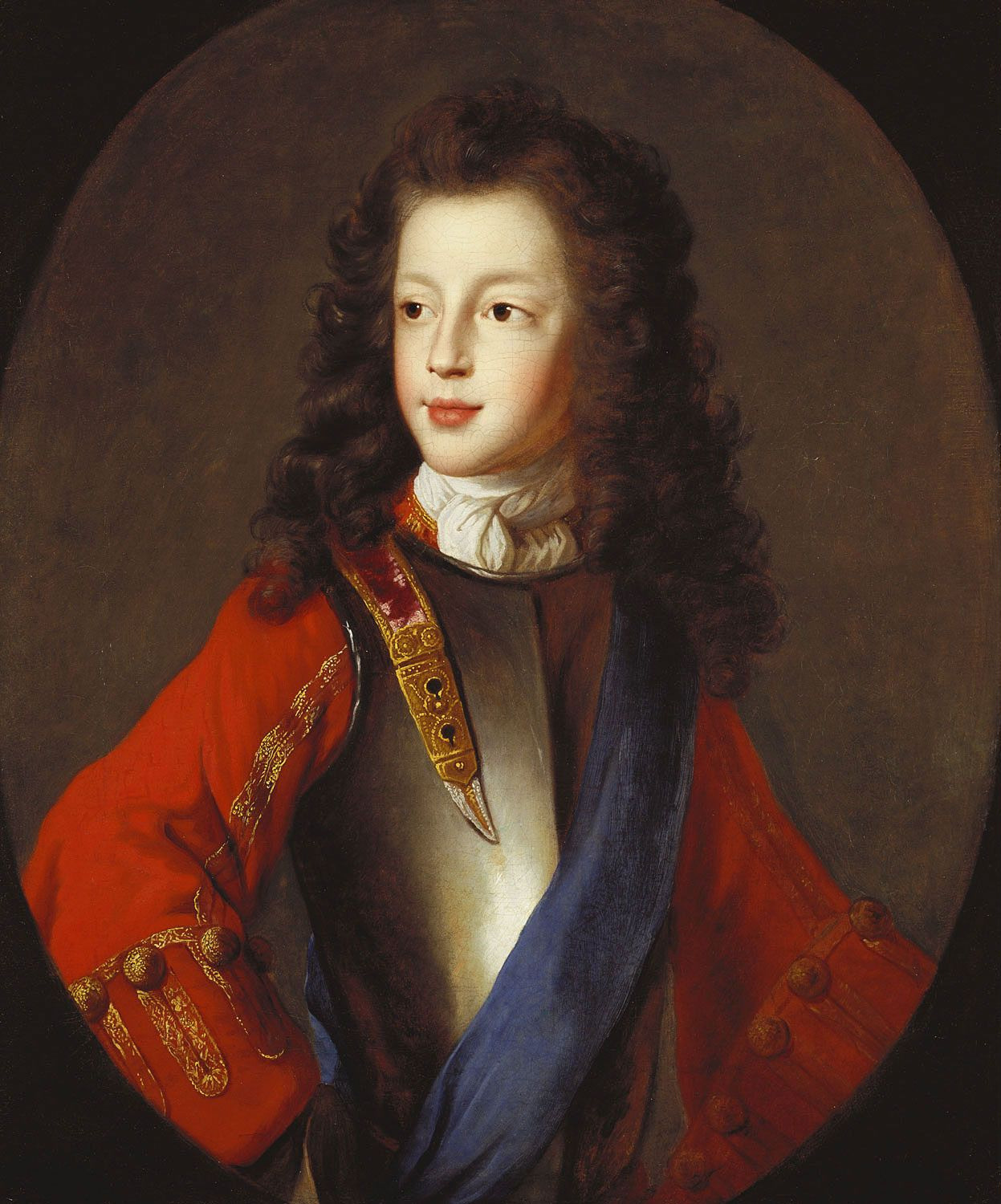
Prince James Francis Edward Stuart, the Old Pretender, aged c.15 about 1703; portrait in the Royal Collection attributed to Belle
