= Benoît-Louis Prévost =

French engraver

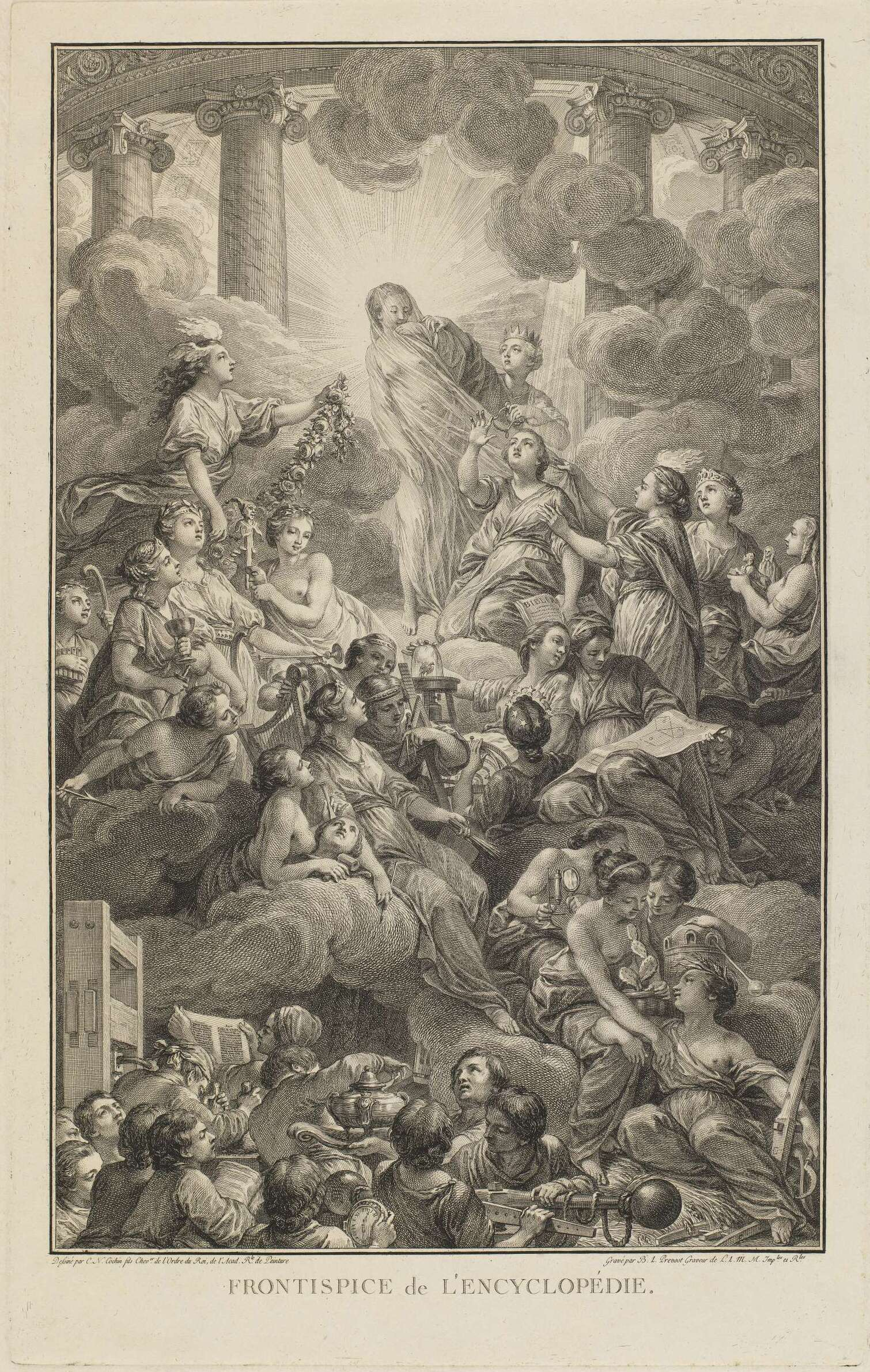
- frontispiece of the Encyclopédie ou Dictionnaire raisonné des sciences, des arts et des métiers
- Born: 1733; Paris
- Died: 1816 (aged 82–83)

Bonaventure Louis Prévost (Paris, 11 March 1733 – 19 March 1816)

== Biography ==
A student of Jean Ouvrier, Prévost was a skilled craftsman, much more so than his master. He engraved more than sixty of Charles Nicolas Cochin's drawings with great fidelity and precision. The most well-known of his works is the 1765 frontispiece of the Encyclopédie ou Dictionnaire raisonné des sciences, des arts et des métiers (often known just as the "Encyclopédie"), edited by Denis Diderot and Jean Le Rond d'Alembert, depicting "la Raison et la Philosophie arrachant son voile à la Vérité rayonnante de lumière" ("Reason and Philosophy catching the [sun]beams of Truth"), engraved from Cochin's drawing of 1764.

== Works ==
Other famous works include Allégorie à l’honneur de Louis-Auguste, dauphin de France, Suite de douze sujets ("Suite of twelve subjects"), Allégories pour l’édition in-4° de l’abrégé chronologique de l’histoire de France du président Hénault. He made portraits of Louis XV, Marie Antoinette, Armand Thomas Hue de Miromesnil, Louis XVI, and two of the Conquêtes de l’Empereur de Chine ("Conquests of the Chinese Emperor"), all from works by Cochin. From works by Jean-Michel Moreau he engraved a portrait of Joseph Ignace Guillotin and a portrait entitled Voltaire marchant dans son jardin ("Voltaire working in his garden").
