= Frédéric Horthemels =

- The Virgin Mary adoring the Christ Child, engraved by Frédéric Horthemels, after Benvenuto Tisi, Metropolitan Museum of Art, New York
- Born: 1688; Paris, Kingdom of France
- Died: 4 November 1737 (aged 48–49); Paris, Kingdom of France
- Known for: Engraving
- Movement: Baroque
- Relatives: Marie-Anne Horthemels (sister); Louise-Magdeleine Horthemels (sister); Charles-Nicolas Cochin (brother-in-law)

Frédéric Horthemels (1688 – 4 November 1737) was a French engraver and etcher.

== Biography ==
Horthemels was the first son of Daniel Horthemels and Marie-Anne Cellier. His three sisters, Marie-Anne, Marie-Nicole, and Louise-Madeleine, were also engravers. His brothers, Denis and Daniel II, both became booksellers and publishers. Frédéric's father, Daniel, was a Dutch from the island of Walcheren. Toward the end of the 17th century, he had moved to Paris, where he worked as a bookseller. Originally a Protestant, Daniel converted to Catholicism upon his marriage with Marie-Anne Cellier, and became a follower of the Dutch Roman Catholic theologian Cornelis Jansen.

Little is known about Frédéric's life. He contributed to the Recueil de Crozat, a finely-illustrated, two-volume, including reproductive prints of some of the finest paintings and drawings in French collections. He is credited with the drawing for a fine portrait of the theologian Jacques Boileau, which was engraved by his eldest sister, Marie-Anne. Frédéric also contributed to theDescription historique de l'Hôtel royal des Invalides, published in Paris in 1756 and featuring etchings and copperplate engravings by prominent 18th-century French artists, including Charles-Nicolas Cochin and Pierre-Alexandre Aveline. It was probalby through her brother Frédéric that Cochin met his future wife, Louise-Magdeleine Horthemels.

The last years of Frédéric Horthemels are rather obscure. Shortly before his death, he had fallen on hard times and found shelter at the Collège de Cornouailles, a college of the University of Paris, established to provide accommodation for impoverished students. On 4 November 1737, he was discovered dead in his room at the college. Works by Frédéric Horthemels can be found today in many collections, including those of the United States National Library of Medicine, the British Museum, the Philadelphia Museum of Art, and the print collection of the University of Warsaw Library.

== Gallery ==
Adam kneels in grief beside the body of Abel, engraving by Frédéric Horthemels after Andrea Sacchi, c. 1729, Metropolitan Museum of Art, New York

Christ and the Samaritan Woman, engraving by Frédéric Horthemels after Benvenuto Tisi c. 1729, Metropolitan Museum of Art, New York

The Virgin in Prayer, engraving by Frédéric Horthemels after Domenico Fetti c. 1729, Metropolitan Museum of Art, New York

The Pentecost, engraving by Frédéric Horthemels after Gaudenzio Ferrari, 1729, Rijksmuseum, Amsterdam

== Bibliography ==
- Rocheblave, Samuel (1893). Les Cochin (in French). Paris: Librairie de l'art, G. Pierson et cie.
