= Louise-Magdeleine Horthemels =

French artist (1686–1767)

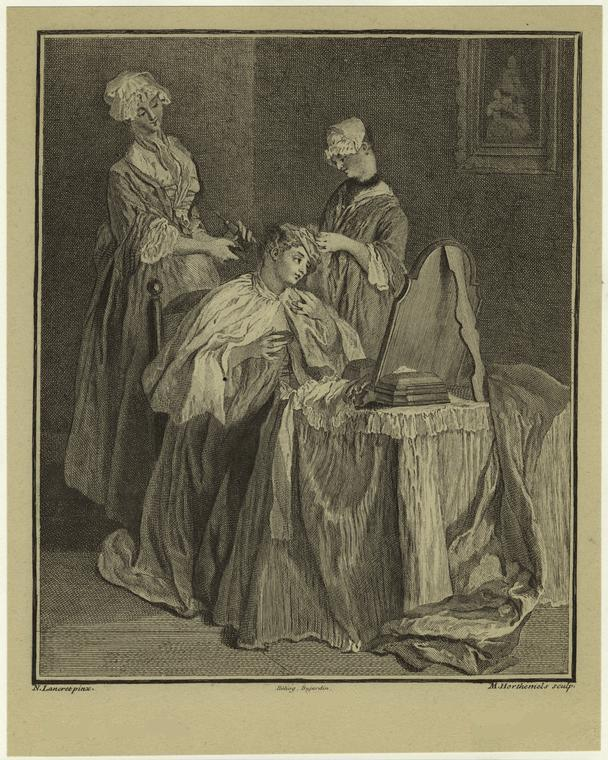
Woman Having Her Hair Styled by Nicolas Lancret, engraved by Horthemels

Louise-Magdeleine Horthemels, or Louise-Madeleine Hortemels, also called Magdeleine Horthemels (1686 – October 2, 1767), was a French engraver, the mother of Charles-Nicolas Cochin. She is also sometimes credited under her married name of Louise Madeleine Cochin or Madeleine Cochin.

== Life ==
The parish register of the parish of Saint-Benoit, Paris, shows that Louise-Magdeleine, baptized in 1686, was one of at least six children of Daniel Horthemels, a bookseller, and his wife Marie Cellier. The Horthemels family had come from The Netherlands. Originally Protestants, they became followers of the Dutch Roman Catholic theologian Cornelis Jansen and had links with the Parisian abbey of Port-Royal-des-Champs, the centre of Jansenist thought in France.

Active as a copperplate engraver by 1707, on 10 August 1713 Horthemels married another engraver, Charles-Nicolas Cochin the Elder. There were several more engravers in their extended family, including Cochin's brother Frédéric and the two sisters of Horthemels, Marie-Anne-Hyacinthe (1682–1727), who was the wife of Nicolas-Henri Tardieu (1674–1749), an eminent engraver, a member of the Academy from 1720, and Marie-Nicole (b. 1689, died after 1745), who was married to the portrait artist Alexis Simon Belle.

Louise-Magdeleine Horthemels' son Charles-Nicolas Cochin the Younger became an engraver to the court of King Louis XV, a designer, writer, and art critic.

Horthemels died in Paris at her son's house on 2 October 1767.

== Work ==
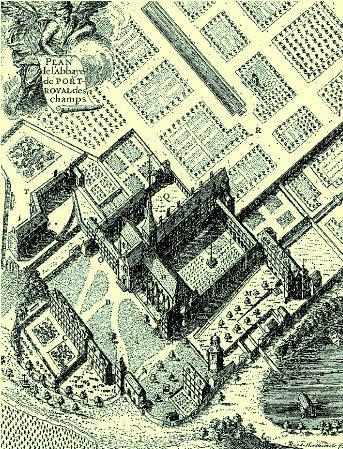
Plan of the Abbey of Port-Royal-des-Champs, engraving by Horthemels, c. 1710

Horthemels was active in Paris as an engraver for nearly fifty years and produced more than sixty signed copper plates.

Her first published work was a frontispiece for Alain-René Lesage's novel Le Diable boiteux (1707), which she signed Magdeleine Horthemels fec. Her later work is signed variously Magd. Horthemels, L. Mag. Horthemels, M. Horthemels, Magd. Horthemels Sponsa C. Cochin, and Magdeleine Cochin.

It was long believed that Louise-Magdeleine and her sisters Marie-Nicole and Marie-Anne-Hyacinthe all signed work Marie Horthemels, but a careful study has shown that the signed work of the sisters can easily be distinguished. Nevertheless, the members of the family commonly worked together on a single composition.

Louise-Magdeleine Horthemels engraved paintings by Nicolas Poussin, Charles Le Brun, Antoine Coypel, Michel Corneille the Younger, Claude Vignon, and Nicolas Lancret, and produced illustrations for a history of the Hôtel des Invalides and for a history of the Languedoc, in collaboration with her husband Charles-Nicolas Cochin the Elder. She designed a series of twenty-three plates depicting the nuns of the abbey of Port-Royal and their everyday life. The abolition of the abbey had been ordered by a bull of Pope Clement XI in September 1708, the remaining nuns were forcibly removed in 1709, and most of the buildings were razed to the ground in 1710, on the orders of the Conseil du Roi of King Louis XIV.

Horthemels completed a great plate called Le feu d'artifice de la place de Navone, after Giovanni Pannini, which had been begun by her son Charles Nicolas Cochin. She also engraved portraits, such as a copper engraving of Prince James Francis Edward Stuart, after an early eighteenth-century painting by her brother-in-law Alexis Simon Belle.

In the early work of Horthemels as an engraver, there is a certain rigidity of line, while architectural detail is emphasized. However, her skill lay in engraving the work of others so that their genius was revealed and her own style was suppressed. Her hand was sure, and her work shows a delicacy and clarity of touch which were much admired in her own time.

== Gallery ==
Abbey of Port-Royal des Champs, by Louise-Magdeleine Horthemels, c. 1709

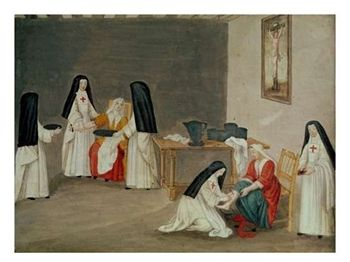
Caring for the Sick

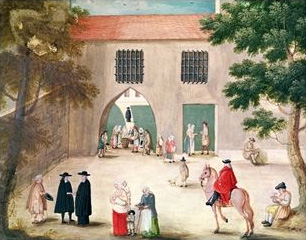
Distributing Alms to the Poor

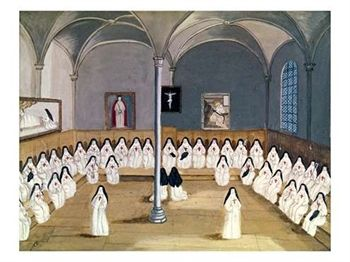
The Sisters of the Abbey

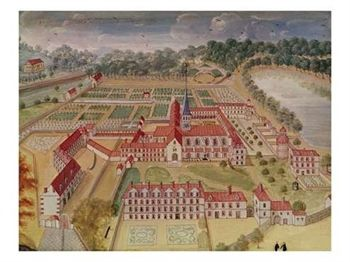
General View

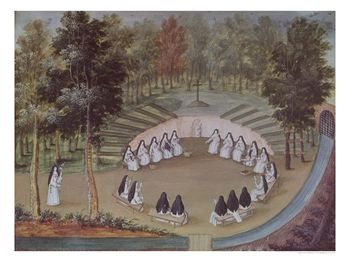
Nuns Meeting in Solitude

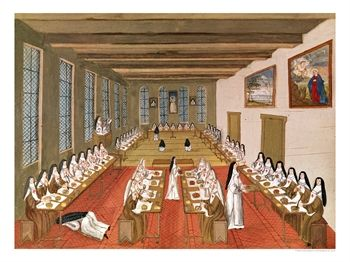
View of the Refectory
