= Marie-Anne Horthemels =

French artist (1682–1727)

Marie-Anne-Hyacinthe Horthemels
- Born: 1682
- Died: 24 March 1727 (aged 44–45); Paris, Kingdom of France
- Known for: Engraving
- Spouses: Germain Le Coq, Nicolas-Henri Tardieu

Marie-Anne-Hyacinthe Horthemels (1682 – 24 March 1727) was a French engraver, wife of the King's engraver Nicolas-Henri Tardieu.

== Biography ==
Marie-Anne-Hyacinthe Horthemels was one of three daughters of the Dutch bookseller Daniel Horthemels (c. 1650-1691) and his wife Marie Cellier (b. 1656), from Saint-Maurice, to the southeast of Paris. The family converted from Protestantism to Roman Catholicism, and became followers of the theologian Cornelius Jansen. Marie-Anne had at least five siblings. Her sister Louise-Magdeleine Horthemels was an active reproductive engraver who married Charles-Nicolas Cochin, graveur du roi. Marie-Nicole married Alexis Simon Belle, peintre ordinaire du roi. Her brothers Daniel and Denys continued in the bookselling trade, while Frédéric Horthemels was also an engraver.

Marie-Anne's first marriage was to the pastry-maker Germain Le Coq, who had worked for King Louis XIV (1638–1715) and for the Duchess of Burgundy. They married around 1705, and Germain died around 1710. They had at least one son, Germain-Jacques Lecocq. At the age of thirty, on 20 April 1712 she married again, to Nicolas-Henri Tardieu. They had five children: Louis-Nicolas, Jacques-Nicolas, Pierre-Denis, Marie-Perrette and Marie Madelaine. Jacques-Nicolas Tardieu was born on 2 September 1716 in Paris. He was also to become a well-known engraver.

Marie-Anne-Hyacinthe Horthemels died on 24 March 1727 at the age of 45.

== Work ==
Marie-Anne had a talent for engraving, and is known for her portraits of Cardinal de Bissy, Cardinal de Rohan and the Regent Philippe II, Duke of Orléans. (Note: Her work is usually signed "Marie Horthemels", although her portrait of Cardinal de Bissy is signed "Marie-Hyacinthe Horthemels". There had been some debate over the authorship of the engravings signed only "Marie Horthemels", since they could be the work of her sister Marie-Nicole. However, the location of "rue Saint-Jacques, au Maecenas" is given on pieces signed "Marie" and "Marie-Hyacinthe", indicating that they are all the work of Marie-Anne-Hyacinthe Horthemels.) The British Museum has an engraved portrait of James Francis Edward Stuart, the Old Pretender, after a painting by Alexis Simon Belle, dated 1720. The portrait was engraved by "MM. Horthemels", and is thought to be her work.

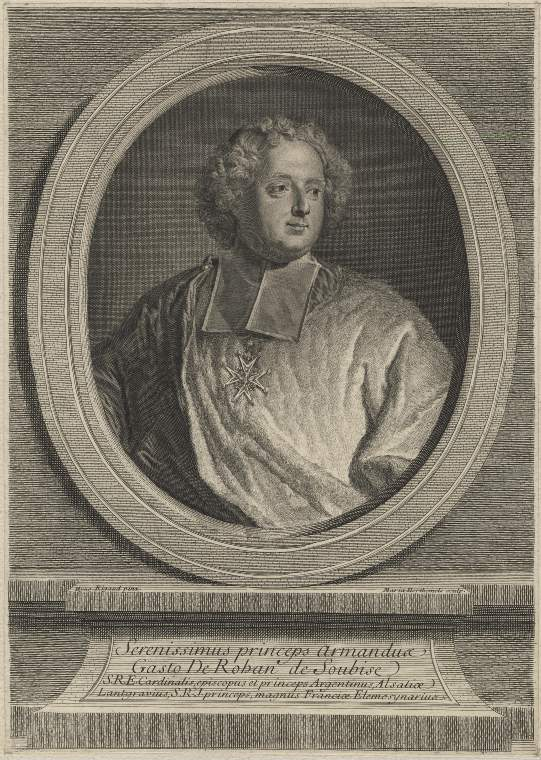
Armand Gaston Maximilien de Rohan by Marie Anne Horthemels after Hyacinthe Rigaud

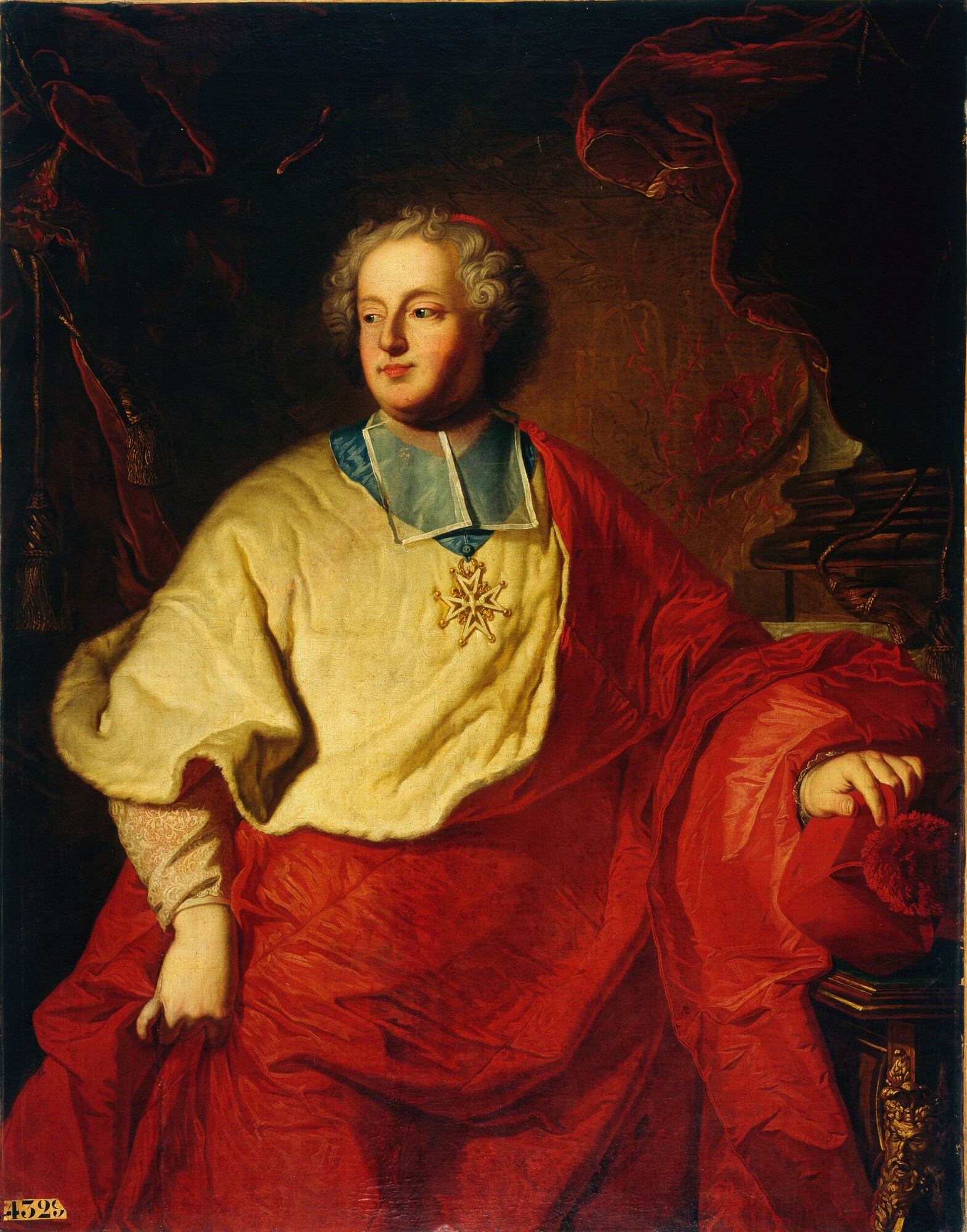
Portrait of Armand-Gaston-Maximilien de Rohan by Hyacinthe Rigaud

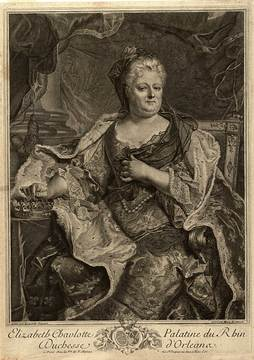
Elizabeth Charlotte, Princess Palatine (1652-1722) by Marie Anne Horthemels after Hyacinthe Rigaud

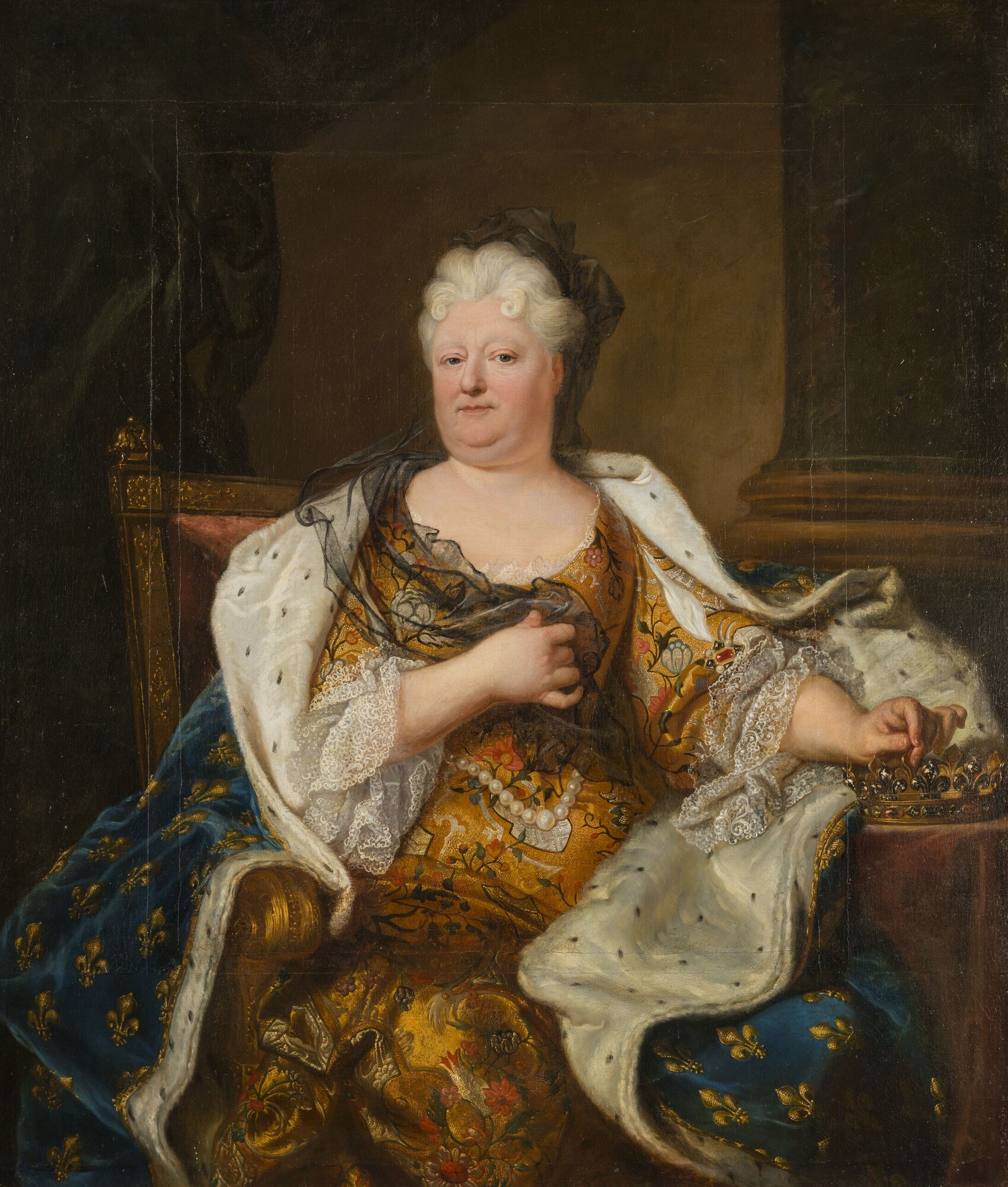
Portrait of Elisabeth Charlotte of the Palatinate (1652-1722), Duchess of Orléans by Hyacinthe Rigaud

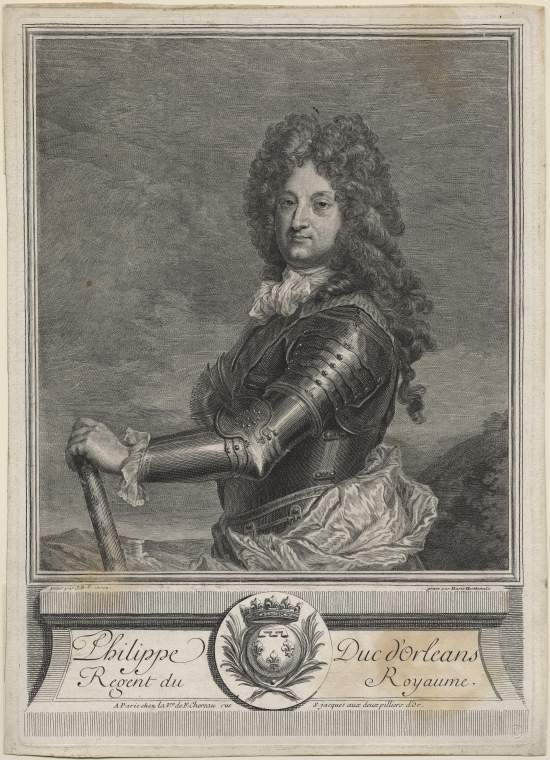
Philippe II, Duke of Orléans after Jean-Baptiste Santerre

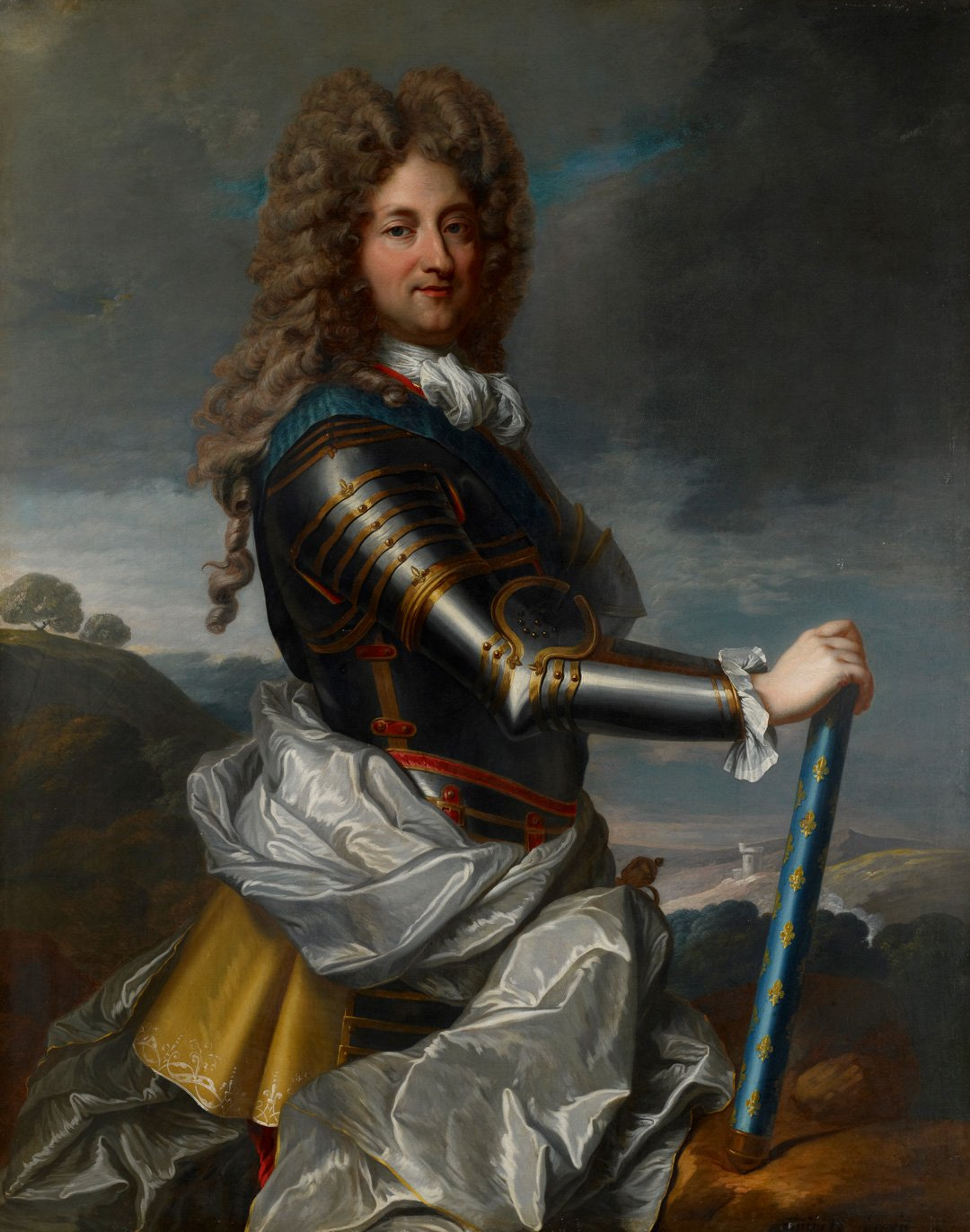
Philippe II, Duke of Orléans by Jean-Baptiste Santerre

== Sources ==
- Bann, Stephen (2001). Parallel Lines: Printmakers, Painters and Photographers in 19th Century France. Yale University Press. p. 173. ISBN 978-0-300-08932-5.
- Chavignerie, Émile Bellier de La; Auvray, Louis (1885). Dictionnaire général des artistes de l'école française depuis l'origine des arts du dessin jusqu'à nos jours: Architectes, peintres, sculpteurs, graveurs et lithographes (in French). Renouard.
- "Jacques III Pretendent D'Angleterre &c. of Ridder van St. Joris / Het Groote Tafereel der Dwaasheid". British Museum.
- Jal, Auguste (1867). Dictionnaire critique de biographie et d'histoire (in French). Plon.
- Mariette, Pierre-Jean; Chennevières, Ph de; Montaiglon, Anatole de (1856). Archives de l'art français: recueil de documents inédits relatifs à l'histoire des arts en France (in French). J.-B. Dumoulin.
- Montaiglon, Anatole de (1856). Archives de l'art français: recueil de documents inédits relatifs à l'histoire des arts en France. J. B. Dumoulin. p. 53.
- Poulson, Elizabeth (Autumn–Winter 1985). "Lousie-Magdeleine Horthemels: Reproductive Engraver". Woman's Art Journal. 6 (2): 20–23. doi:10.2307/1357994. JSTOR 1357994.
