= Donat Nonnotte =

French painter (1708–1785)

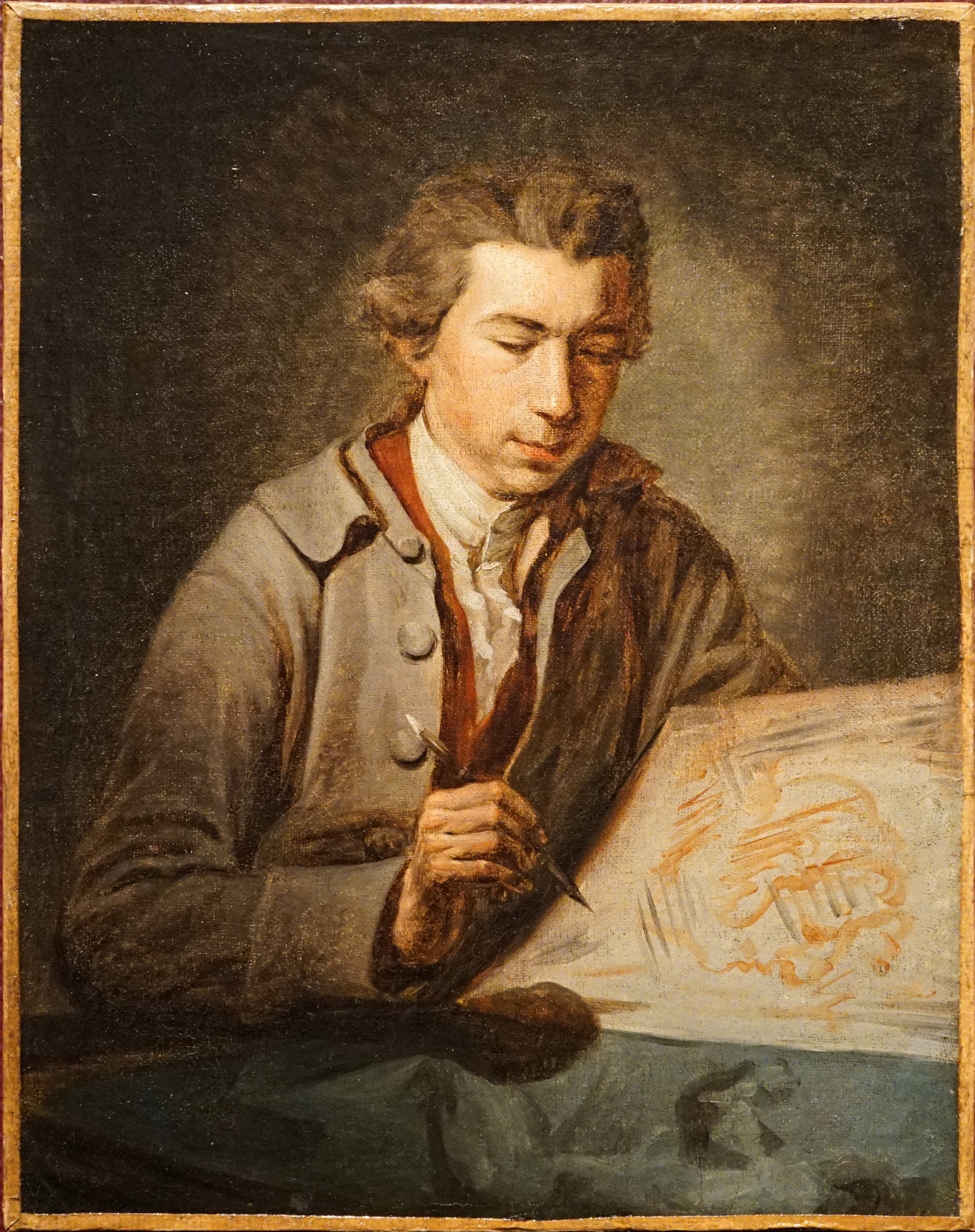
- Self-portrait
- Born: Donatien Nonnotte; 10 January 1708; Besançon, France
- Died: 4 February 1785 (aged 77); Lyon, France
- Known for: Portrait painting

Donatien Nonnotte (10 January 1708 – 4 February 1785) was a French painter who specialized in portraiture.

A native of Besançon, Nonnotte was received by the Académie royale de peinture et de sculpture in 1741 as a portrait painter. In 1754, he moved to Lyon, where he obtained the title of "official painter" of the town in 1762. Most notably, he taught François-Hubert Drouais.

== Gallery ==
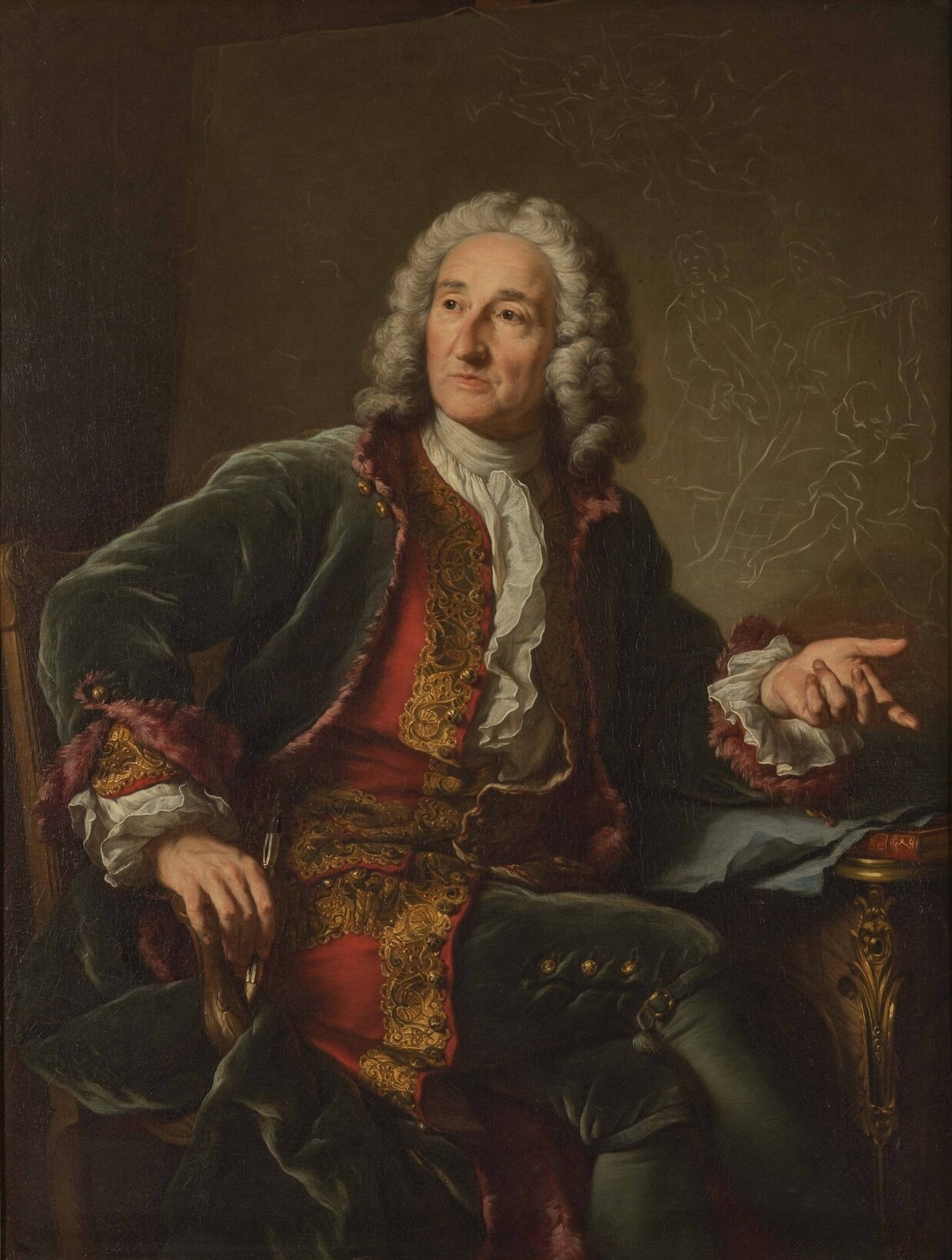
Portrait of Pierre Dulin, Nonnotte's reception piece to the Académie royale (1741)

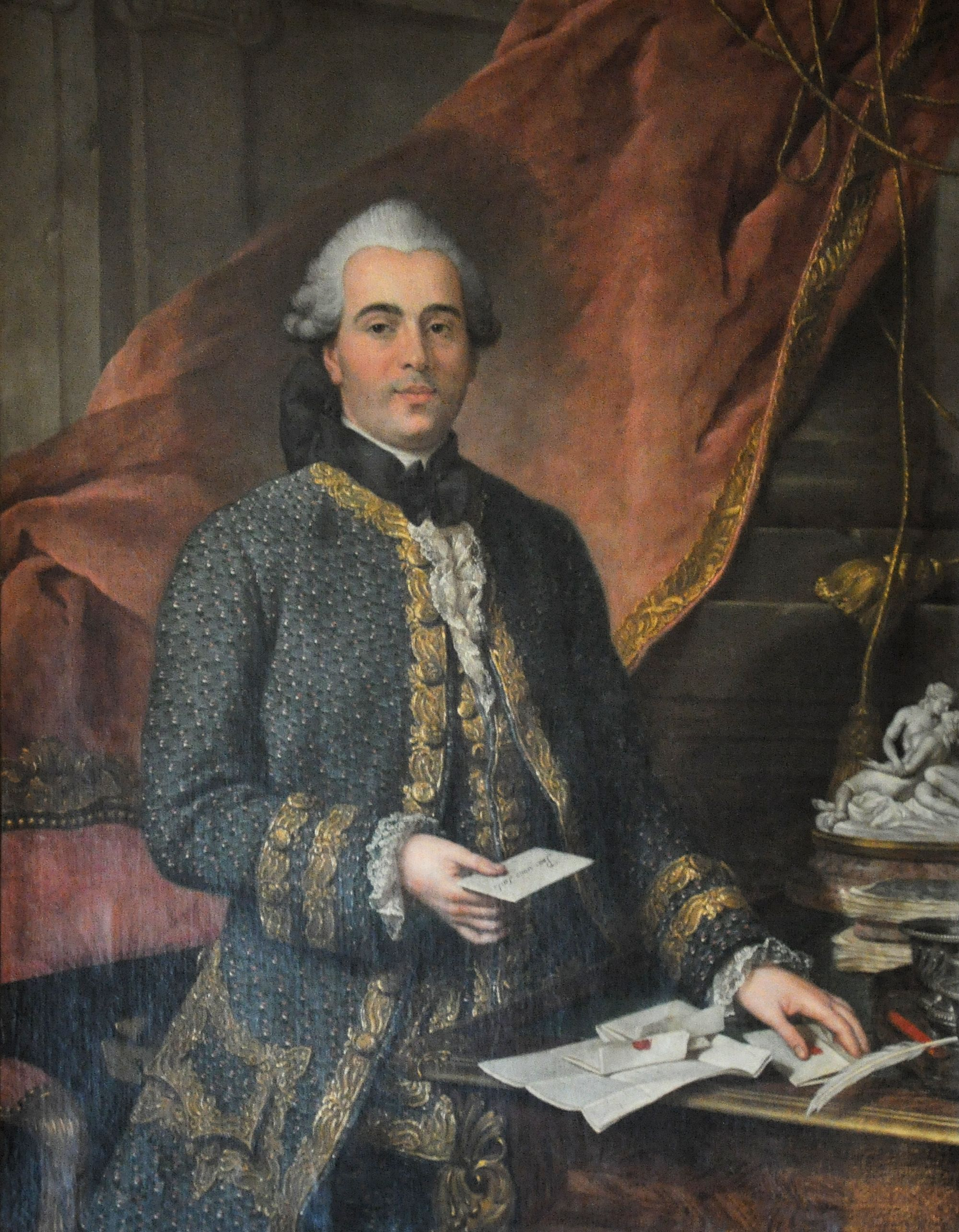
Portrait of Jacques de Flesselles

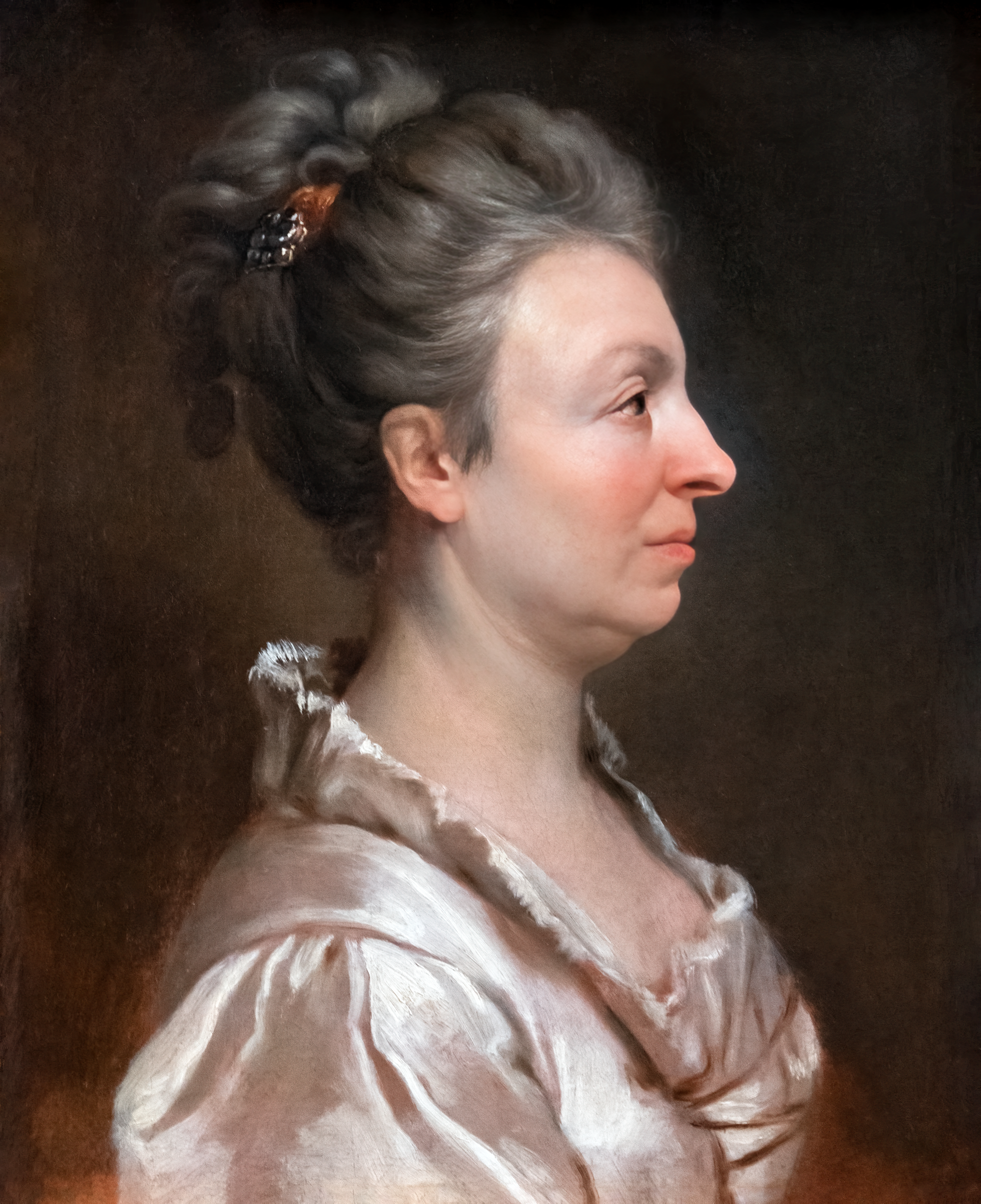
Portrait of a Woman - Musée des Beaux-Arts de Narbonne

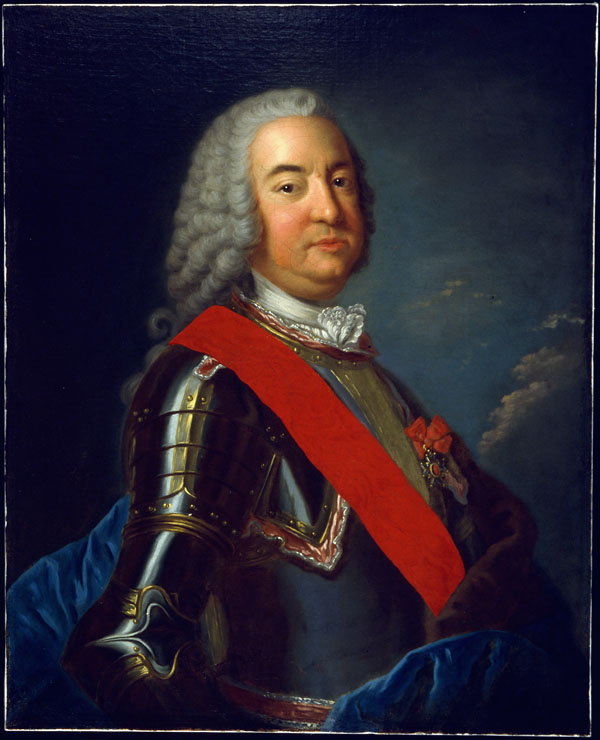
c. 1754 portrait of Pierre de Rigaud, marquis de Vaudreuil-Cavagnial

== Sources ==
- Klingsöhr-Leroy, Cathrin (2003). "Nonnotte, Donat [Donatien]". Grove Art Online.
- Sordet, Yann (2001). L ́amour des livres au siècle des Lumières: Pierre Adamoli et ses collections. Librairie Droz. p. 366. ISBN 978-2-900791-45-5.
