= Pierre Dulin =

French painter (1669–1748)

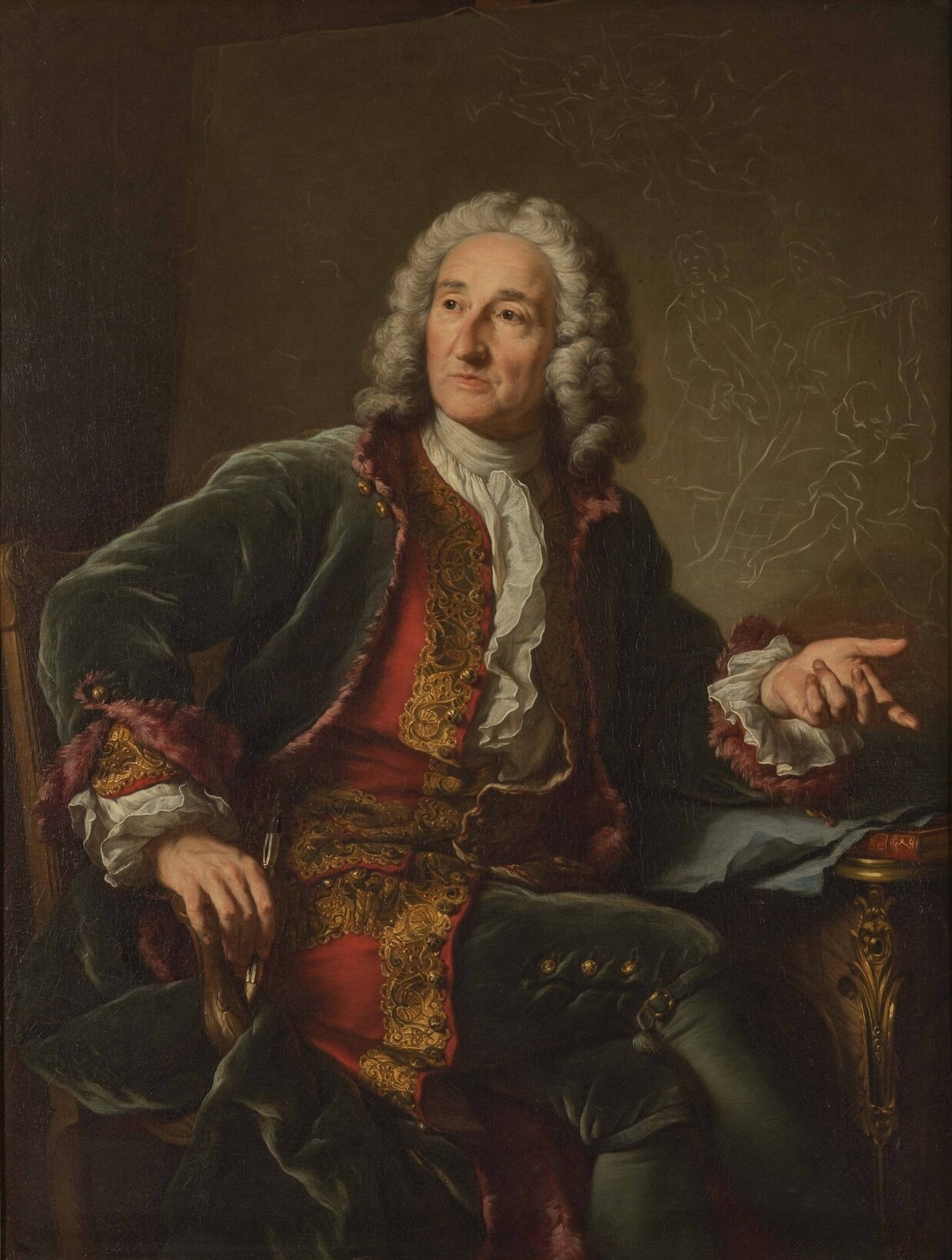
Portrait by Donat Nonnotte, 1741

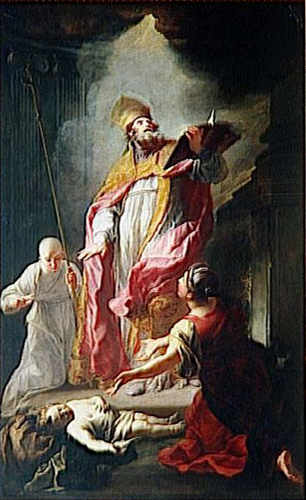
Saint Claude ressuscitant un enfant, oil on canvas, c. 1737, 247 by 157 centimetres (97 by 62 in); Musée national des châteaux de Versailles et de Trianon

Pierre Dulin, or Pierre d'Ulin (17 September 1669 – 28 January 1748), was a French painter.

== Early years ==
Pierre Dulin was born in Paris on 17 September 1669. After learning some principles of grammar and Latin, Dulin studied geometry and practical perspective under Sébastien Leclerc. He was intended to become an architect like his father, and was required to study that subject under Philippe de La Hire. In a relatively short time he could draw buildings with ease and taste. So that he could also draw figures and ornaments, still with the goal of becoming an architect, his father put him under Friquet de Vauroze of the Academy of Architecture. This is where painting became his sole interest. He resisted the wishes of his family and yielded to this passion.

He was therefore placed in a course at the Royal Academy of Painting under Bon Boullogne, whose classicist style would strongly influence him. Dulin, whose start in art education had been delayed, won few prizes up to 1694, when he was aged 25. The following year, his teacher advised him to stand for the Academy's grand prize. He was admitted to the competition but did not win.

Undiscouraged, he tried again and won the next year with great distinction. His painting, Pharaoh giving his ring to Joseph after the explanation of dreams, was found so much above what had been seen so far from him that there was suspicion of cheating. Before granting the prize to Dulin, the Academy asked that he prove his capacity to the Director, executing in his presence a work on a subject given by the Director. He passed this test successfully.

The next year he entered a picture of Joseph's brothers held as spies in the court of Pharaoh, which was considered an even more brilliant work. The previous year he had tied for the first prize with Michel Cornical, but this time he won more votes than his rival. The Academy excluded him from subsequent competitions as being too formidable an artist, and put him on the list of pupils to go to the Academy of Rome. He was not ready for this trip until the following year, about the time when René-Antoine Houasse was promoted to the direction of the school of Rome, and he proposed to accompany Houasse.

== Work for Richelieu ==
However, work that he had undertaken for the Duke of Richelieu obliged him to defer the trip to Rome. This was a great allegorical subject that would decorate a sundial in the garden of the hotel that Richelieu occupied in the Place Royale. The taste that Dulin had shown in his sketch was so great that Richelieu could not bring himself to let him go and he even obtained an order from Mansart for him to stay. This was less to force him to stay than to ensure that he retained his scholarship to the school of Rome. The Duke loved the arts and artists, and felt this sentiment to a particular degree with Dulin, since he kept Dulin in his house, admitted him to his table and provided servants to look after him. When the sundial was complete, Dulin began composition of several works: Time, The Three Fates, Daybreak Personified and The Genie of the Hours. He also made two large portraits of the Duke, one dressed as a Roman on horseback, the other of him in armor.

The piece which brought him the greatest applause, and was seen as a wonder, was a painting he made in great secrecy after three paintings by Nicolas Poussin that represented pagan festivals and that were owned by Richelieu. Dulin chose a party in honor of Bacchus, which was composed and executed so much in the style of Poussin, that many connoisseurs there were taken in, ensuring that his new patron became one of his most zealous promoters. His reputation brought him to Mansart's attention, who engaged ham and proposed he should not leave Paris, with an offer of working for the King and a recommendation to the Academy to receive him,

== Rome ==
Dulin nevertheless placed great store on what he could learn in Italy and was so determined to go that, afraid that the Duke de Richelieu would raise some new obstacle, he left without taking leave. He arrived in Rome at the beginning of March 1700. He became absorbed in the study of the great works of art that had attracted him. Above all he endeavored to penetrate the beauties of Raphael's paintings in the Vatican. The effort and care that he put into copying the Battle of Attila brought him to the attention of Pope Clement XI. The pontiff, who loved the arts, in which he was educated in his youth and in which he maintained pleasure, talked to him more than once in a very amicable way.

Dulin made an altarpiece for the Dominicans in Rome on the subject of Saint Thomas Aquinas, kneeling, presenting the Virgin with his book Summa Theologica. This brought him into a special relationship with Antonin Cloche, general of the order, with whom he discussed principles of architecture, the proportions of the five orders, and initiated the theory of plans. During his stay in Rome, Dulin made several portraits that made his reputation. He was chosen in preference to all others to portray the Spanish ambassador to Rome. When his pension expired and he was preparing to return to France, he had a private audience with the Pope, who pressed him to stay in Rome. When Dulin resisted, the Pope presented him with his portrait, set in a ring, ornamented with two rubies and some diamonds, and gave him several medals and relics.

== Later years ==
Dulin was received by the Academy on 30 April 1707 with the painting Laomedon punished by Apollo and Neptune as his reception piece. Dulin was elected Assistant Professor on 26 October 1726. He died in Paris 28 January 1748.

== Selected works ==
Paintings

- Établissement de l’Hôtel Royal Des Invalides, 1674, Paris, musée de l’armée
- Jésus Christ guérissant les aveugles, Œuvre détruite
- Laomédon puni par Neptune et par Apollon, École nationale supérieure des Beaux-Arts
- Saint Claude ressuscitant un enfant, Versailles, musée national du château et des Trianons
- L'annonciation, Musée d'Évreux

Drawings

- An album of drawings depicting the coronation of Louis XV is preserved at the Louvre Museum, in the Department of Graphic Arts, inventory numbers 26299 to 26357, in the réserve des grands albums. It is a valuable document containing 59 drawings illustrating the coronation ritual.
