= Charles-Nicolas Cochin the Elder =

French line-engraver (1688–1754)

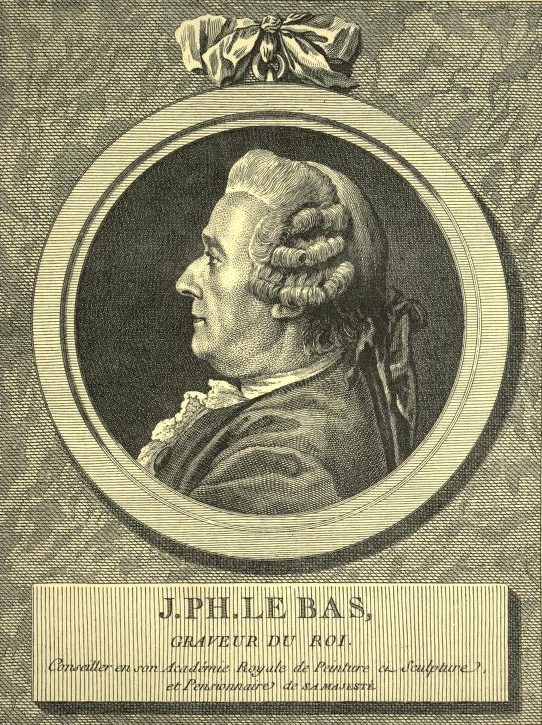
Portrait of Jacques-Philippe Le Bas (1707-1783), French engraver, engraved by Louis-Jacques Cathelin after Charles-Nicolas Cochin, (1798), taken from the book "French engravers and draughtsmen" by Dilke (1902)

Charles Nicolas Cochin the Elder (29 April 1688 – 5 July 1754) was a French line-engraver.

He was born in Paris in 1688. His father, Charles Cochin, was a painter, and Charles Nicolas followed the same profession until he was twenty-two years of age, when he abandoned painting and devoted himself entirely to engraving. In 1731 he became an Academician, and on the occasion of his reception engraved the portraits of Jacques Sarrazin and Eustache Le Sueur. He then turned his attention to the fancy subjects of Watteau, Lancret, and Chardin, after whom he executed several fine works. He also assisted his son, Charles Nicolas Cochin, with the plates of the ceremonies at the marriage of the Dauphin with Infanta the Infanta of Spain in 1745. He died in Paris in 1754, having engraved about one hundred plates, among which are many vignettes for the 'Virgil' of 1742 and other books. The undermentioned are his best works:

- La Mariée de Village; after Watteau.
- Decoration du Bal paré; after C. N. Cochin, Fils. 1745.
- Decoration du Bal masque; after the same. 1745.
- Decoration et Dessein du Jeu tenu par le Roy et la Reine, 1747; after the same.
- Le Jeu du Pied-de-boeuf; after De Troy.
- Le Jeu de Colin-Maillard; after Lancret.
- Fuyez Iris; after the same.
- L'Amant sans gêne; after the same.
- La Blanchisseuse: La Fontaine; after Chardin.
- L'Ecureuse : Le Garçon Cabaretier; after the same.
- The Funeral of the Queen of Sardinia, 1735; after Perault and Slodtz.

Louise-Magdeleine Horthemels, the wife of Cochin, likewise practised engraving. She was born in Paris in 1686, and married in 1713. Among the plates which she executed two of the best are 'La Charmante Catin' and 'Le Chanteur de Cantiques,' which form part of the set of the 'Charges des Rues de Paris,' designed by her son. She also completed his large plate of the 'Feu d'artifice ' at Rome, which greeted the birth of the Dauphin in 1729, and often assisted him in other works. She died in Paris in 1767.

Further details respecting Cochin and his works are to be found in MM. Portalis and Béraldi's 'Graveurs da dix-huitième siècle,' i. 492–502.
