= Marie Salmon =

French woman wrongfully convicted (c. 1760–1827)

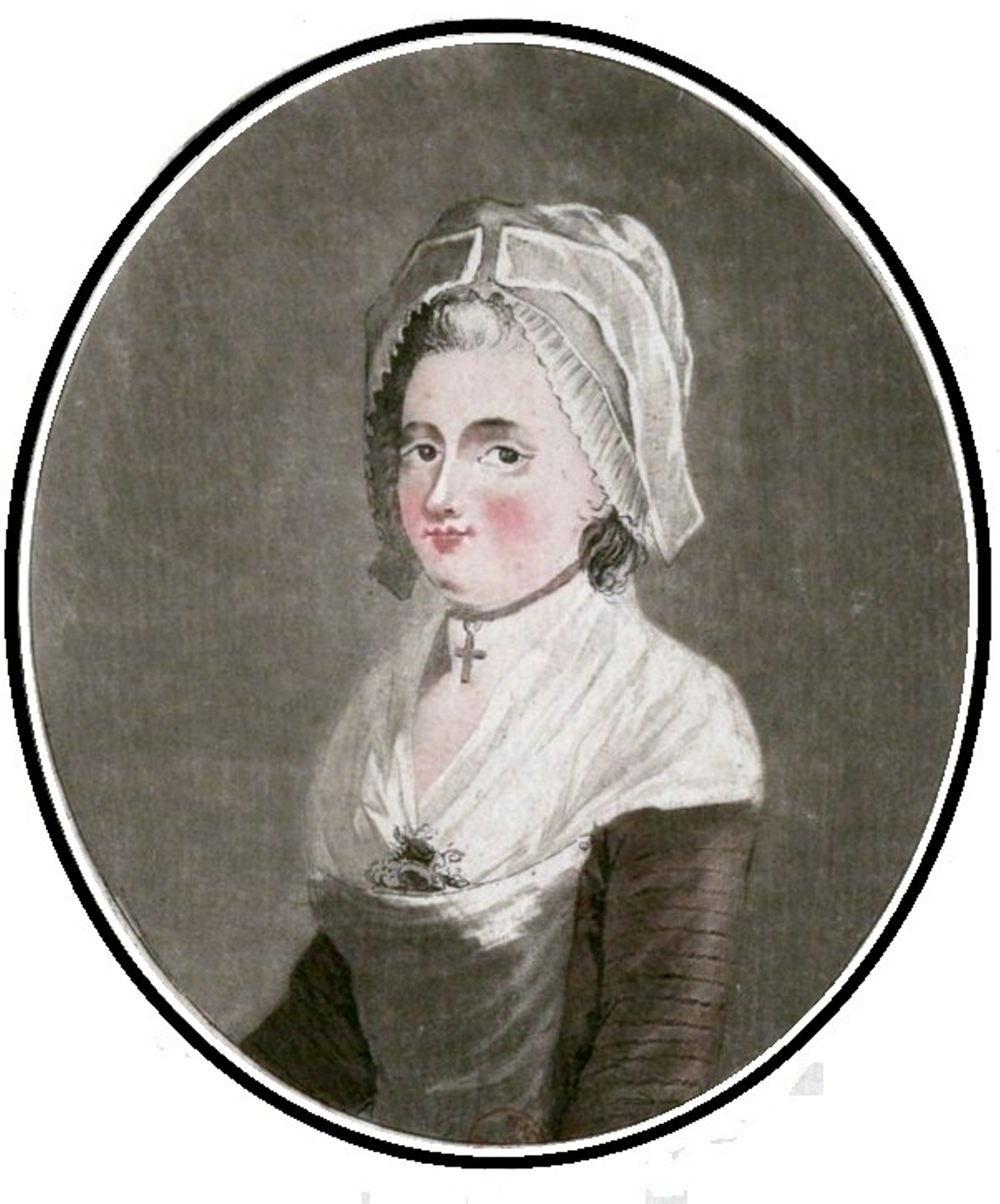
- Portrait of Marie Salmon in 1786
- Born: Marie Françoise Victoire Salmon (Note: Her given names are "Marie Françoise Victoire" (in that order), and sources refer to her inconsistently, sometimes calling her Marie, Françoise, or Victoire. In the announcement of her marriage and in her death records, her full name is written as "Marie Françoise Anne Salmon".) c. 1760 (Note: Marie Salmon's birth year is contradicted across several sources, sometimes appearing as 1756 based on baptismal records with the Archives départementales de la Manche or as 1763. However, her lawyer Pierre Noël Lecauchois stated that she was born in 1760 in the opening of his legal brief, Justification de Marie-François Victoire Salmon.); Méautis, Normandy, Kingdom of France
- Died: 2 May 1827 (aged 67); Paris, France
- Other names: Marie Françoise Anne Salmon; Citizen Savary
- Occupation: Domestic servant
- Known for: Wrongful poisoning conviction and exoneration

Marie Françoise Victoire Salmon (c. 1760 – 2 May 1827) was a French domestic servant in the Kingdom of France who was wrongfully convicted of fatally poisoning her employer and was condemned to be tortured and burned alive in 1782. After narrowly avoiding execution, she was fully acquitted of all charges in 1786 with the help of the lawyers Pierre Noël Lecauchois and Jean-François Fournel, who argued her innocence through a series of widely-circulated legal briefs that exposed a flawed criminal investigation and garnered public sympathy and support.

Salmon's exoneration was celebrated throughout France, elevating her to a celebrity status and earning her invitations from high society, including from Queen Consort Marie Antoinette and the writer Madame de Genlis. Her story became a popular symbol of the harsh and unfair criminal justice system of the ancien régime.

Madame de Genlis arranged for Salmon to marry Jean-Louis Savary, a soldier who Lecauchois had exonerated several years earlier. With Salmon and Savary's consent, the House of Orléans funded their wedding ceremony, including the dowry. The couple had a daughter, and Salmon later adopted her niece as well. She died in 1827 at age 67.

== Early life ==
Born in 1760, Marie François Victoire Salmon was the daughter of a day laborer in Méautis, Normandy. When she was young, a pig attacked her and permanently disabled her left hand, leaving her unable to fully open that hand. After her mother died and her father remarried, she left home at 15 to seek employment as a domestic servant.

In 1781, a parish priest attempted to rape Salmon; he was caught and convicted, but quickly released. A magistrate named Roland Revel de Bretteville, who knew her through her employer, suggested that she protect herself from the priest by moving to Caen, where he offered her a job in his household. However, Salmon noticed that Revel was trying to seduce her, so she found work as a domestic servant for the Huet-Duparc family in Caen instead.

== Poisoning incidents ==
=== Death of Paysant de Beaulieu ===
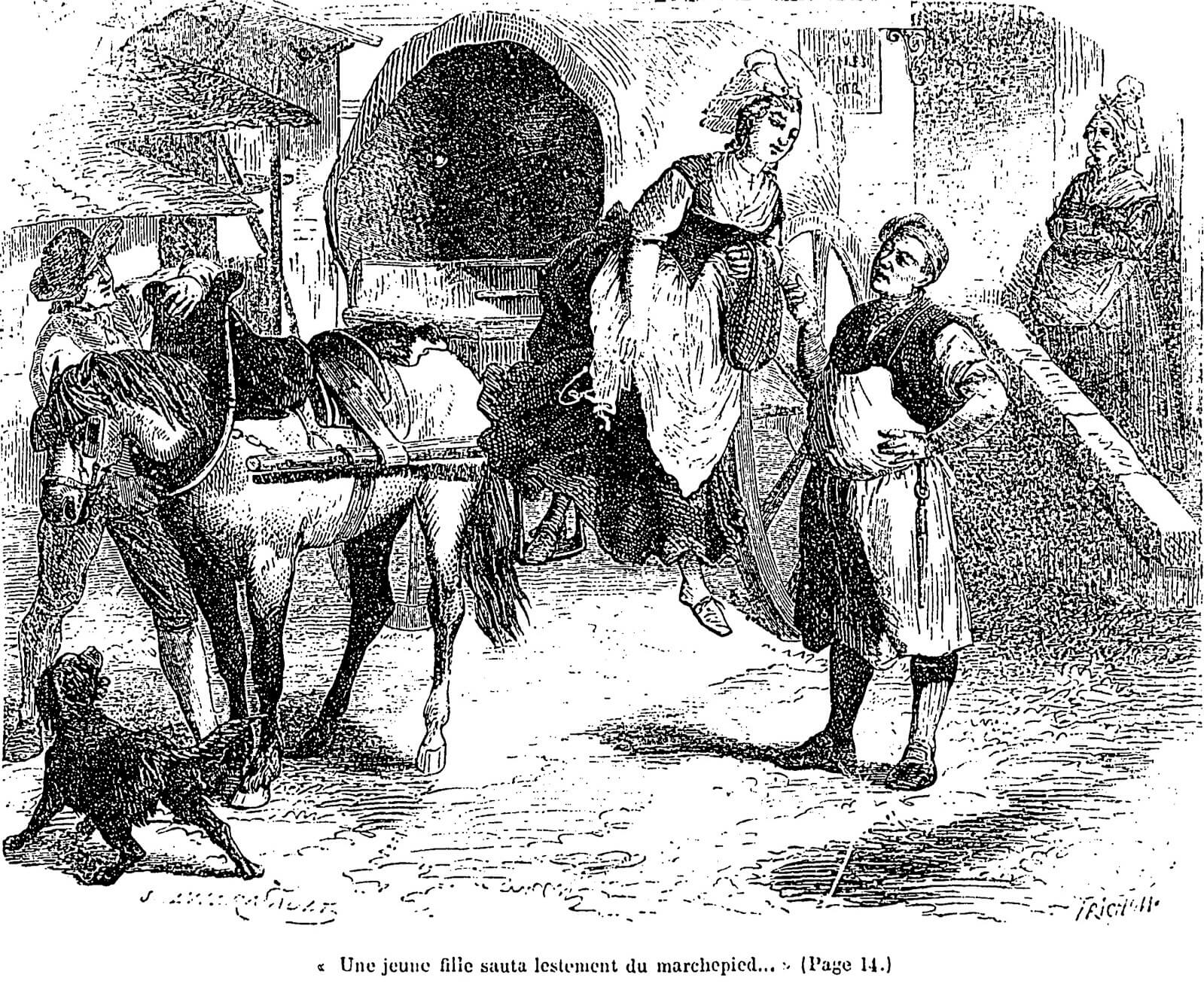
Salmon arrives at the Huet-Duparc home

The Huet-Duparcs were a petite bourgeoisie family consisting of Madame Duparc, her husband, three children, and two grandparents. Salmon's duties for the household included preparing simple porridge meals for the 88-year old grandfather, Paysant de Beaulieu. According to Salmon, Madame Duparc gave her specific instructions for preparing Beaulieu's meals. However, on 6 August 1781, after Salmon had only been employed for 5 days, Madame Duparc interrupted Salmon's meal preparations and sprinkled salt into Beaulieu's porridge, even though Duparc had previously told her to never add salt.

Within hours of eating his porridge, Beaulieu became violently ill, vomiting and convulsing. Salmon sat by his sick bed and cared for him as he continued to worsen, while Madame Duparc told her son to ride out of town to inform his father of Beaulieu's condition. Beaulieu died that same evening on 6 August 1781.

=== Second poisoning and arrest ===
The following day on 7 August, while Salmon completed her duties and rested, Madame Duparc and her daughter prepared two separate soups: one for the family made with fresh broth and the other for Salmon and the housekeeper made from the previous day's broth. Later, Salmon helped serve the soup with new broth to the Huet-Duparc family and their dinner guests, and then she went to the kitchen to eat her own bowl.

Shortly after eating their soup, the Huet-Duparcs and their guests complained of stomach pains, and Madame Duparc declared that she smelled burnt arsenic in the kitchen. The guests became frantic, with one guest crying out "NOUS SOMMES TOUS EMPOISONNÉS!" [emphasis in source] (transl. "We are all poisoned!") News spread throughout the neighborhood, and people gathered at the Huet-Duparc home to investigate the commotion. After seeing the frenzied state of the Huet-Duparc family, who continued to insist that they had been poisoned, observers called for the authorities to arrest Salmon.

== Conviction and delayed execution ==
The Procureur du Roi (transl. King's Prosecutor) in the baillage court of Caen, Roland Revel de Bretteville, whom Salmon had left a few weeks earlier after she had declined his assistance, was assigned to investigate the case. After conducting what her lawyers would later argue was a prejudiced and flawed investigation fueled by personal animus, Revel sought the death penalty for Salmon.

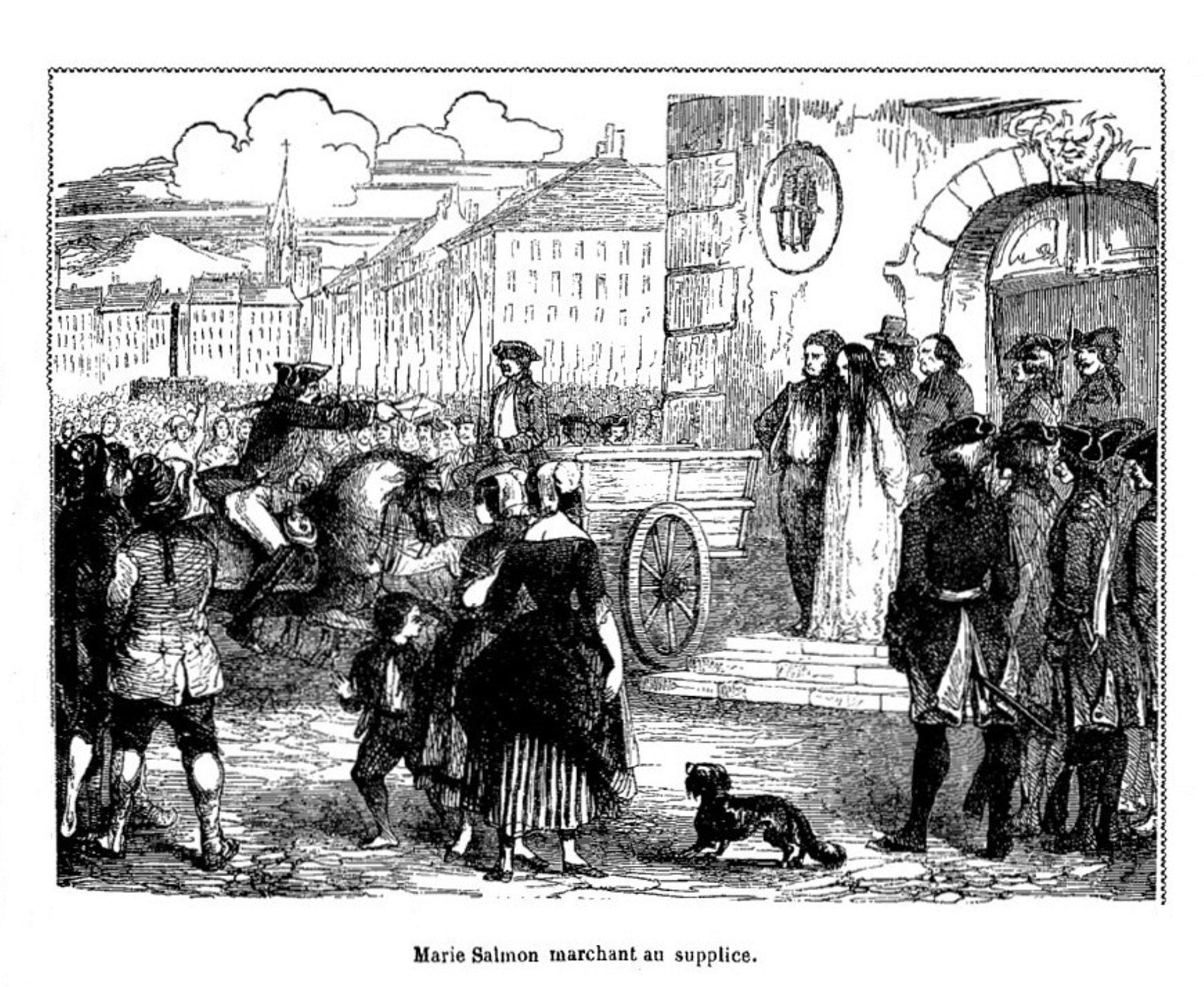
A drawing of Marie Salmon marching to her execution from Histoire des bagnes (1878) by Pierre Zaccone.

On 18 April 1782, the baillage court of Caen found Salmon guilty of poisoning, murder, and theft. She was "condemned to be tortured for the names of possible accomplices, to beg forgiveness in public barefoot and carrying a torch, and to be burned at the stake." The Parlement of Rouen upheld the conviction. The execution would take place in Saint Sauveur square. While she was awaiting execution, Father François Lambert heard Salmon's religious confession and believed she was innocent. Lambert told her to claim she was pregnant in order to delay her execution, which would give him time to seek legal assistance on her behalf.

On 30 May 1782, the day of her execution, Salmon suddenly fainted and declared she was pregnant. The execution was delayed while two midwives were summoned to examine her. The midwives could not definitively determine if she was pregnant at that time, so Salmon's execution was further postponed for two months, as the criminal code of the ancien régime stipulated that the execution of a pregnant woman should be delayed until after the birth of her child.

During this delay, Lambert and another confessor wrote to a regionally famous lawyer from Rouen named Pierre Noël Lecauchois, asking him to reexamine her case. Lecauchois took on the case and immediately instructed Salmon's confessors to file an official request to review the trial. He then obtained a stay of execution on Salmon's behalf. Due to delays in transferring documents, news of the court order reached Caen just a few days before she was scheduled to be executed.

== Retrial and exoneration ==
=== Strategy ===
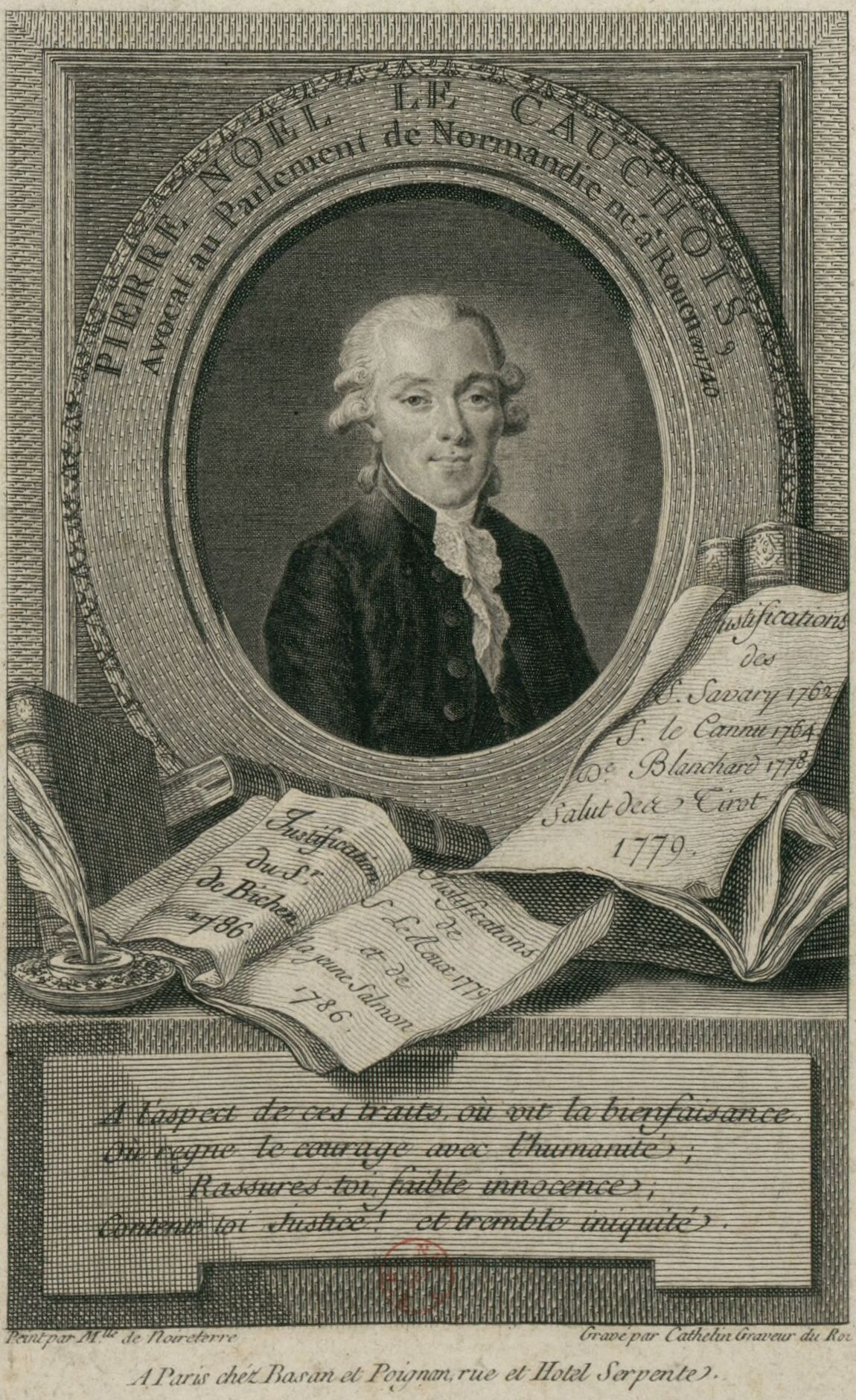
Lecauchois by engraver Louis-Jacques Cathelin and painter Marie-Thérèse de Noireterre. The names of those he freed are written below his portrait, including Marie Salmon as "le jeune Salmon 1786" or "the young Salmon 1786".

Salmon's lawyer Lecauchois wrote a mémoire judiciaire (transl. legal brief) to argue Salmon's innocence and published it for the general public, later producing a longer brief entitled Justification de Marie-Françoise-Victoire Salmon. He worked with a colleague named Turpin, and, during the course of the proceedings, the "gifted and well-established" Parisian lawyer Jean-François Fournel joined them. Fournel wrote his own brief in support of Salmon titled Consultation pour une jeune fille condamnée à être brûlée vive.

Lecauchois opened Justification by recalling past victims of the unjust criminal code:

Ghosts of LeBrun, of the Danglades and Forrés, join that of the unfortunate Calas. ...Bring forth your grief-stricken, ruined families, uncover your bloody-corpses, some cruelly mangled by torture and mutilated on the gallows, others crushed with blows, crawling, expiring on the galleys.

— Pierre Noël Lecauchois (1786), as translated by Sarah Maza

The lawyers' goal in circulating these legal briefs was to sway public opinion in support of Salmon's innocence while also connecting her unjust victimization by the criminal justice system to the broader movement for judicial reforms at the time. In their briefs, they presented the rules of evidence and judicial process, challenging their audience to judge the circumstances for themselves, while also providing an emotionally compelling first-person narrative from Salmon's perspective to "play up [her] candor and vulnerability." As Salmon narrates her story, "the reader is not allowed to forget for long that she is young, tender-hearted, and easily alluring."

=== Arguments ===
==== Prejudiced investigation ====
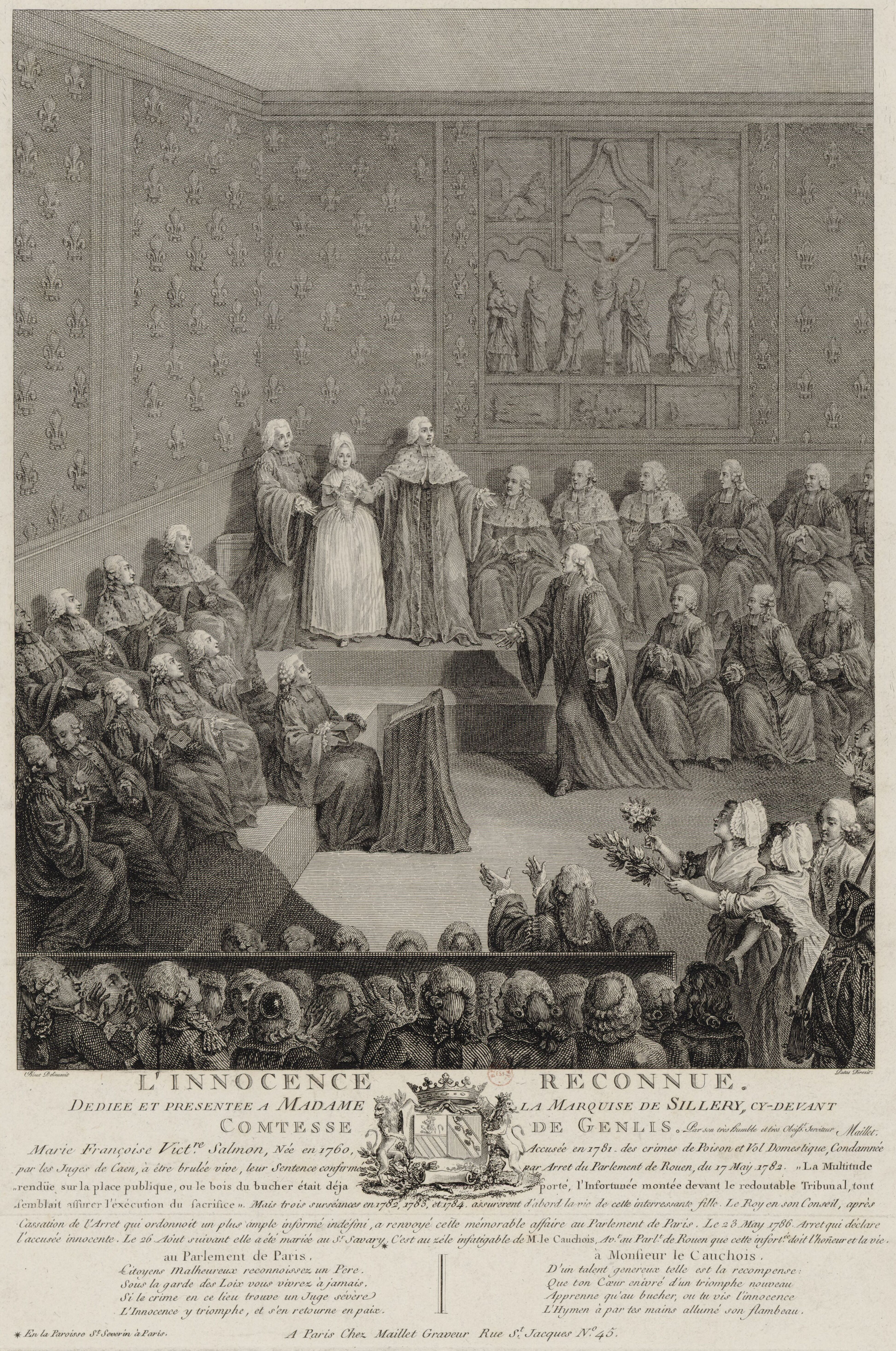
In an engraving prepared for Madame de Genlis that dramatizes the court's recognition of Marie Salmon's innocence, Salmon stands beside her lawyers with her hands clasped in prayer, as they speak to a rapt gallery.

Both Lecauchois and Fournel raised issues with the investigation conducted by the prosecutor Roland Revel de Bretteville. In Justification, Lecauchois accused Revel of deliberately conducting a hasty and flawed investigation. Lecauchois said that Revel collected evidence days after the alleged crime, placed unfair weight on Madame Duparc's testimony against Salmon, neglected to interview key persons of interest such as Madame Duparc's son, and did not consider testimonies that Salmon provided in her own defense.

In Consultation, Fournel described the past relationship that Revel had with Salmon shortly before her employment at the Huet-Duparc household, in which Revel tried to persuade her to move to Caen. According to Fournel, Revel held a deep grudge against Salmon after she had declined his invitation:

Ce même sieur Revel, changé tout-à-coup en adversaire implacable, attiser lui-même le bûcher qui devoit consumer son ancienne protégée : onne pourra méconnoître [sic] le caractère d'un ressentiment aussi profond que secret.

This same Mr. Revel suddenly transformed into a relentless adversary, stoking the pyre that was to consume his former protégée. One cannot fail to recognize the character of a resentment as profound as it was secret.

— Jean-François Fournel (1786)

While Fournel alludes to the "secret" nature of Revel's profound resentment by describing Salmon's beauty and youthfulness alongside Revel's initial "effusion" of benevolence, modern historians Hans-Jürgen Lüsebrink and Sarah Maza state it plainly: Revel felt spurned after Salmon rejected his sexual advances.

==== Lack of evidence or motive ====
According to Lecauchois, the police, surgeon, and lawyer who arrived at the Huet-Duparc home to investigate Beaulieu's death readily accepted the Huet-Duparc family's accusations against Salmon and possibly even planted evidence against her. In one example, Lecauchois said that when Salmon was searched, a shiny white substance, believed to be poison, was found in her left pocket, but, notably, she never used that pocket because her left hand had been disabled since childhood, when she was attacked by a pig. In Consultation, Fournel directly accused the Duparc family of framing Salmon for the murder of Beaulieu.

Lecauchois also said that Salmon did not have any motive to poison Beaulieu or anyone in the Huet-Duparc household. He noted that she did not know the Huet-Duparc family prior to working for them, and she had only spoken highly of her employment in the household prior to the Beaulieu's sudden illness and death. Furthermore, he said that she maintained the composure of an innocent person by quickly consenting to searches and agreeing to appear before the king's prosecutor. The Huet-Duparc family, by comparison, behaved very differently. According to Salmon, the family did not grieve for Beaulieu; rather, they seemed "relieved" that he was dead.

=== Proceedings and acquittal ===
Originally, the appeal for a retrial went to the king's court of justice called the Conseil Privé; those proceedings concluded on 18 May 1784, after almost two years. One of the royal magistrates, Godard de Belbeauf, agreed with Lecauchois's arguments that Salmon was innocent and recommended charges against the Heut-Duparcs. However, his colleagues disagreed. On 12 March 1785, Parlement of Rouen annulled the original verdict from Caen while still requiring that Salmon remain in prison. Finally, the case was brought before the Parlement of Paris seven months later, and, on 23 May 1786, after over four years in prison, Salmon was fully acquitted of all charges. A large crowd waited outside the gates of the Palais de Justice in Paris to cheer for Salmon and her lawyers Lecauchois and Fournel as they emerged. Witness and chronicler Siméon-Prosper Hardy wrote that "Toutes les personnes qui assistent à cette scène attendrissante, ont peine à contenir leurs larmes de joie" (transl. "Everyone who witnessed this touching scene could barely hold back tears of joy").

Afterwards, Salmon and Lecauchois had dinner at the home of the Parisian printer André-Charles Cailleau, who had originally published Lecauchois and Fournel's legal briefs about the case. Hardy went to Cailleau's home and wrote that he witnessed crowds gathered in the street outside to watch Salmon through the first-floor windows.

== Freedom and fame ==
=== Nobility and celebrities ===
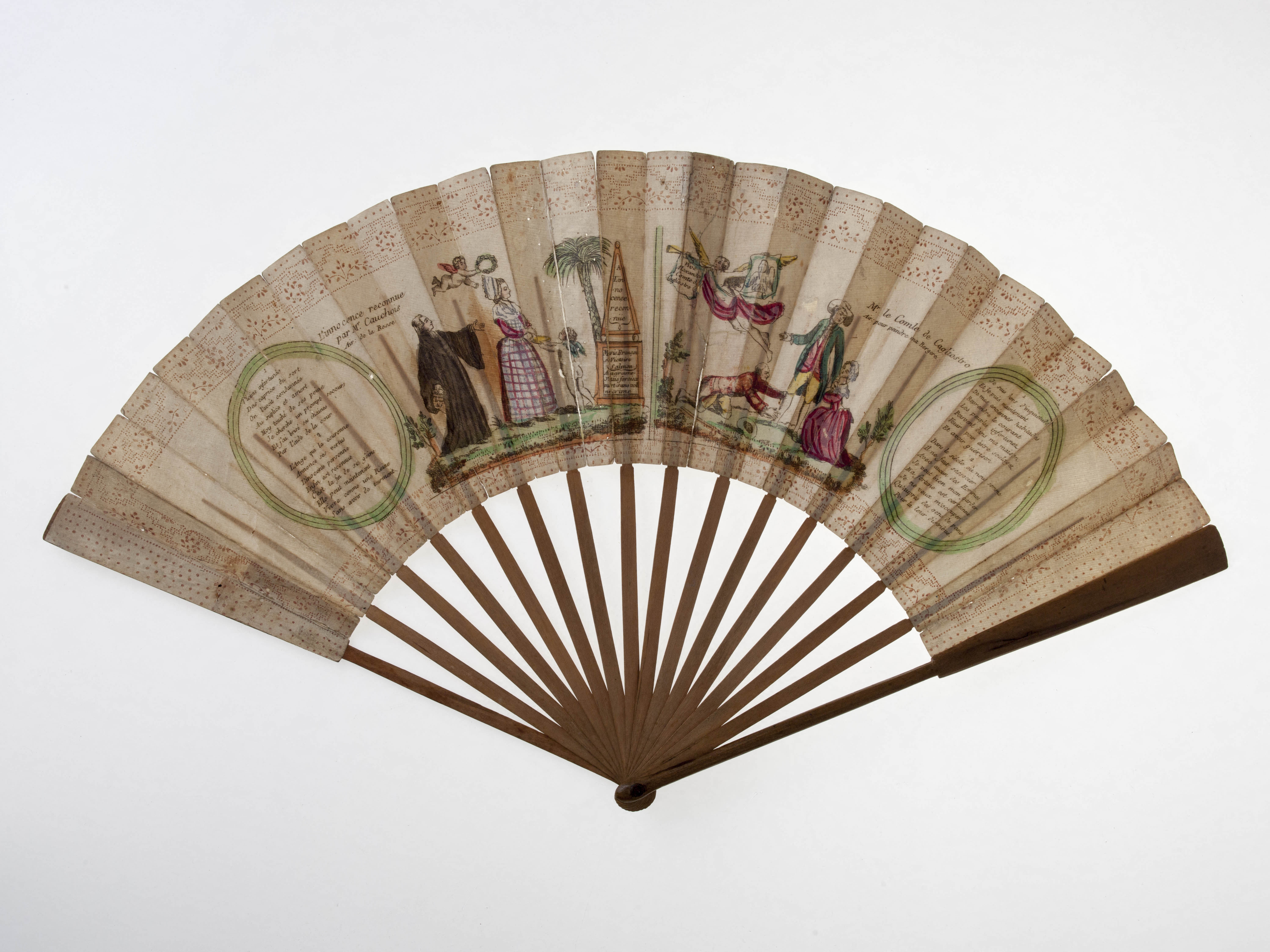
A fan celebrating l'Innocence reconnue (transl. "innocence recognized") of Marie Salmon. She is pictured on the left side of the fan, washing her hands in a basin held by a putto, while another putto places a laurel wreath on her head. Her lawyer Lecauchois stands behind her. Cagliostro is pictured opposite of them on the fan.

In the months following Salmon's exoneration, she and Lecauchois were invited to meet with nobility and celebrities, who bestowed generous gifts. King Louis XVI and Queen Consort Marie Antoinette held a private audience with Salmon and Lecauchois, in which they presented Salmon with a valuable wallet of coins. Hardy wrote that the gift from the royal couple included 25 Louis d'or and a lifetime pension of 300 livres. Salmon also received a sum of money from the Archbishop of Paris, Antoine-Éléonor-Léon Leclerc de Juigné.

Salmon and Lecauchois also met Madame de Genlis and the princes of the House of Orléans. Lecauchois was so moved by their meeting that he published a manuscript entitled Détail sur la fille Salmon (transl. Detail about the Salmon girl) describing the scene. He wrote that Genlis and Salmon's arms were intertwined on the couch as the princes hugged and kissed Salmon, and he lamented that he could not capture the moment in a painting. Lecauchois shared a note he received from Genlis:

Je vous supplie de dire à Marie Salmon qu'elle a laissé dans mon cœur une impression profonde ; et que je goûterai un bonheur inexprimable, en contribuant à la dédommager des maux affreux qu'elle a soufferts.

I beg you to tell Marie Salmon that she has left a deep impression on my heart; and that I will feel immense happiness by helping to compensate her for the terrible suffering she has endured.

— Madame de Genlis in a letter to Pierre Noël Lecauchois (1786)

In Détail sur la fille Salmon, Lecauchois also wrote about an audience with Alessandro Cagliostro, the same Italian charlatan and occultist who was imprisoned in the Bastille after the Affair of the Diamond Necklace, though for unrelated reasons. Cagliostro offered his portrait miniature as a gift to Salmon, and he promised that he would have Lecauchois's legal briefs about Salmon's case translated into English when he travelled to London. (Note: Cagliostro went to London but was "ultimately outwitted by some English lawyers," which landed him in Fleet Prison. After he was freed, he travelled to Rome and was arrested again in 1789, and he remained in prison until his death in 1795.)

=== Public appearances ===
On 8 June 1786, Salmon and Lecauchois were invited to performances at the Comédie-Française and were directed to sit in the balcony, where they were applauded by the actors and audience. They watched performances of Mustapha and L'Amant bourru.

An August 1786 edition of Journal encyclopédique featured a story about "un trait de bienfaisance" (transl. benevolent act) by Salmon. While Salmon was in prison, she had befriended a woman who was imprisoned with her 20-month-old child, and, when that woman died, Salmon continued to care for the child inside the prison. After she was acquitted, Salmon and Lecauchois took the child to the Hôpital des Enfants-Trouvés and asked the priests to care for him there. The child was baptized and named Pierre Noël Daniel Innocent Moreau in a ceremony before 1,200 people.

=== Tributes ===
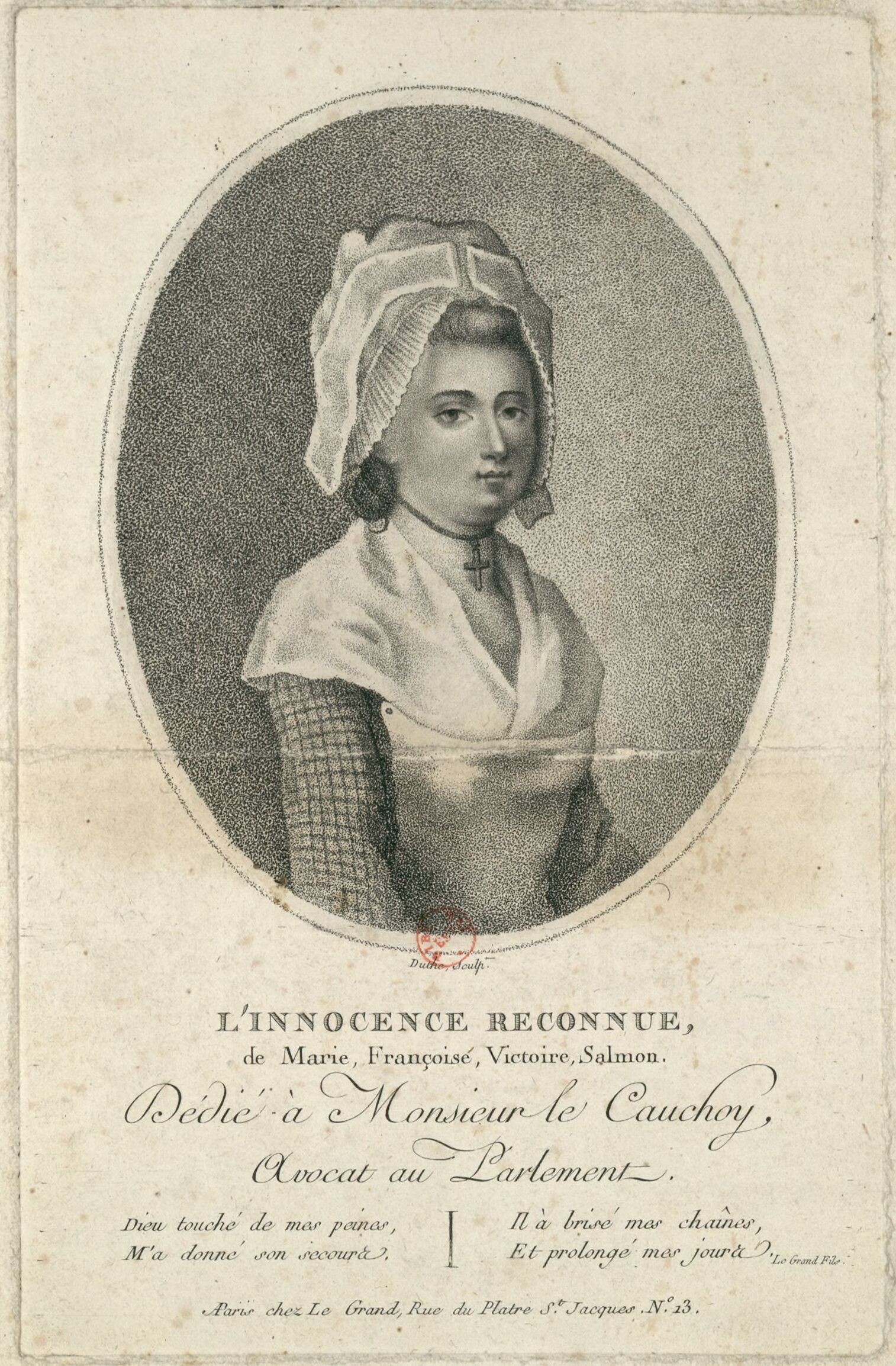
One of many engravings of Marie Salmon that were circulated in France after her exoneration.

Tributes in the form of engravings circulated in periodicals throughout France, celebrating Salmon's exoneration as "L'INNOCENCE RECONNUE" (transl. Innocence Recognized). Other art forms honoring Salmon, including numerous songs, became popular with the illiterate Parisian public. The French librettist and actor Desforges wrote a ballad about her ordeal, sung to the tune of Richard Cœur de Lyon. The first two stanzas are as follows:

Une jeune innocente
Languissait dans les fers,
Seule dans l'univers,
Contre une main puissante ;
Gens indiscrets, d'accord entr'eux,
Ont supposé crimes affreux :
Poison, vol domestique,
Crioient ses ennemis :
Pauvre fille rustique
Les aurais-tu commis ?

Victoire est ingénue,
Dans son œil vif et noir
Il est aisé de voir
Son âme toute nue ;
Son langage est comme son cœur,
Simple, naïf, plein de candeur :
Sa naissance est commune ;
Victoire, en rougis-tu ?
Non; vertu sans fortune,
Vaut mieux qu'or sans vertu.

Translation:

An innocent young girl
Languished in chains,
Alone in the world,
Against a powerful hand;
Indiscreet people, agreeing together,
Suspected horrible crimes:
Poison, domestic theft,
Cried her enemies:
Poor country girl
Would you have committed them?

Victoire is innocent,
In her bright black eye
It is easy to see
Her soul laid bare;
Her speech is like her heart,
Simple, naive, full of candor:
Her birth is common;
Victoire, are you embarrassed by it?
No; virtue without fortune,
Is better than gold without virtue.

=== Marriage ===
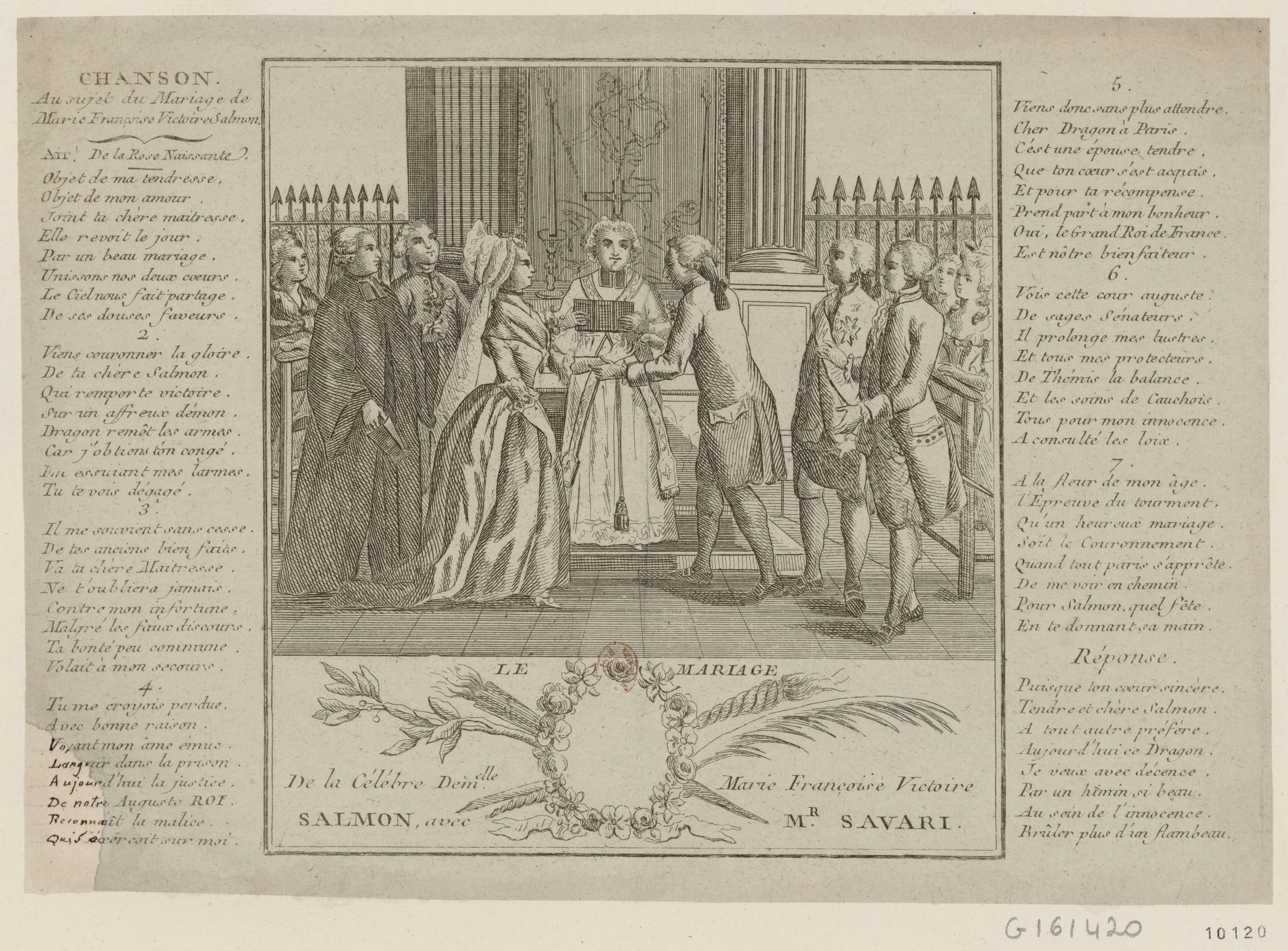
Marriage announcement of Marie Salmon and "Mr. Savari" (Savary). One of her lawyers stands behind her, wearing his court dress.

On 26 August 1786, a few months after she was exonerated, Salmon married a 28-year-old infantry soldier from Lorraine named Jean-Louis Savary at the Church of Saint Severin in Paris. In his chronicle, Hardy wrote that the wedding ceremony was so popular, with people climbing onto the pews and railings, that soldiers were called to manage the crowds.

The marriage was arranged by Madame de Genlis, because she remembered that Lecauchois had previously helped exonerate Savary after he had been accused of kidnapping and theft several years earlier. Both Salmon and Savary consented to the marriage.

The House of Orléans provided the carriage that drove Salmon to the church for the ceremony, and the Duchess of Orléans gifted the newlyweds a dowry of eight or nine thousand livres. Savary was also given a job at one of the castles of the Louis Philippe II, Duke of Orléans.

== Later life and death ==
After the death of the Duke of Orléans during the French Revolution, Salmon's husband transitioned to a role in finance, and Salmon (then called "Citizen Savary") managed a stamped paper office. They had a daughter named Jean-Pauline. Salmon outlived them both: her husband died in 1813, followed by her daughter in 1818. Several years later, she adopted her young niece after her brother died.

Salmon died in the 4th arrondissement of Paris on 2 May 1827 at the age of 67, surrounded by her surviving family.

== Legacy ==
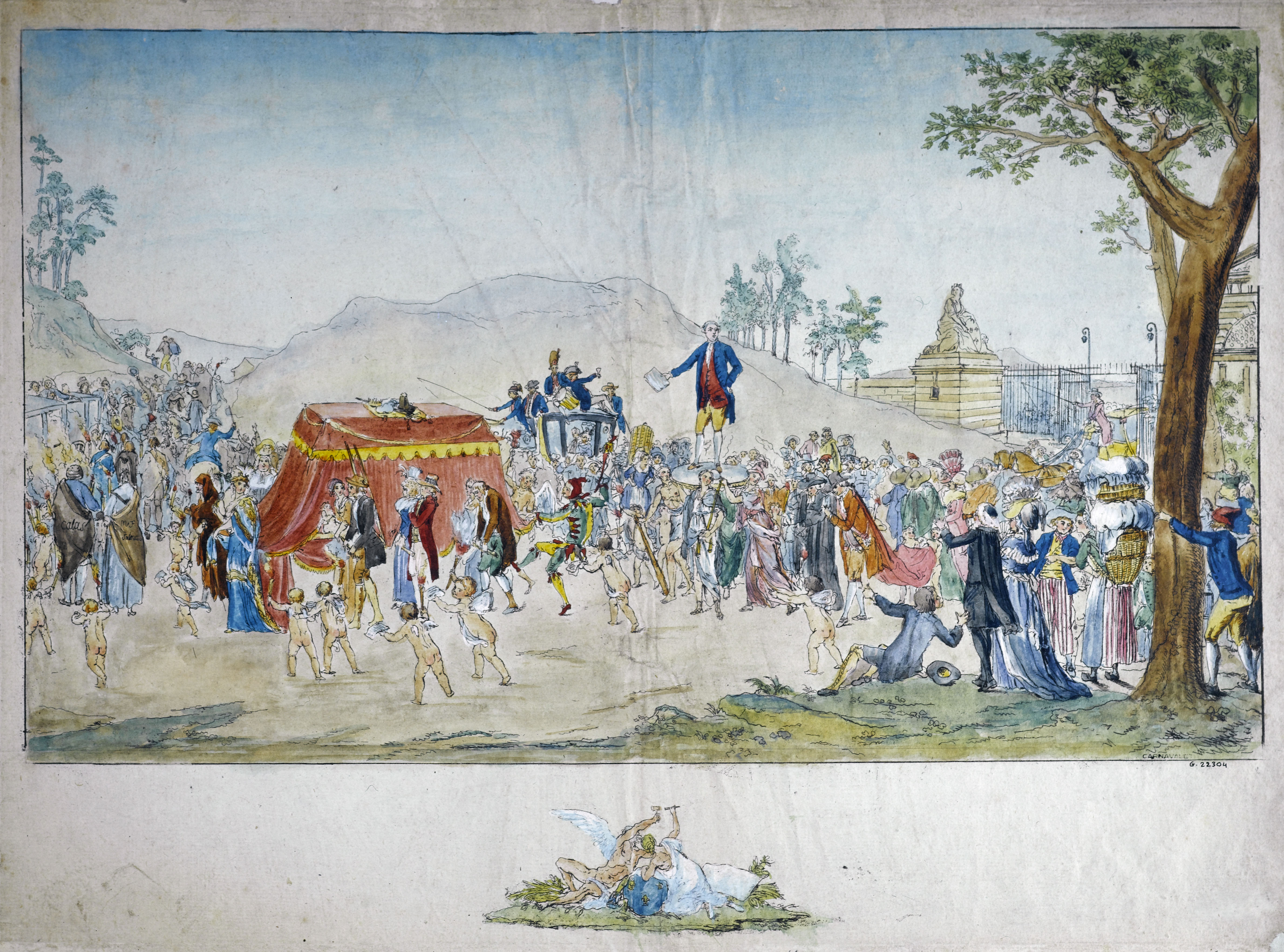
Allegorical illustration of a procession of citizens carrying a coffin and celebrating the end of the "Lord of Abuses" in 1789

Salmon's wrongful conviction, in which she was nearly tortured and burned at the stake for a crime she did not commit, became a symbol of the harsh criminal justice system of the ancien régime. Despite calls to meaningfully reform this system, many reforms prior to the French Revolution were "mostly symbolically charged measures... that cost little, politically, but looked good."

One allegorical engraving by the artists Jean Marie Mixelle and Sergent-Marceau dated 4 May 1789 shows the statesman Jacques Necker in a procession of citizens from all corners of French society, celebrating the death of the "Lord of Abuses" and carrying a coffin with symbols of each of the three estates on top. Leading the procession are famous victims of injustice, identified by their names written on their backs. Salmon is identifiable by "M. F. Salmon" written on her back, and she is drawn walking beside Jean Calas, who was tortured and broken on the wheel in 1762. Necker had abolished the practice of torturing the accused for confessions in 1780. The practice of torturing the convicted for the names of accomplices, which would have been Salmon's fate were it not for the intervention of her lawyers, was abolished in 1788.

Mixelle and Sergent-Marceau's engraving is dated the day before the last Estates General of the Kingdom of France was called on 5 May 1789. At the conclusion of the final Estates General of 1789, the National Assembly was formed, and the French Revolution began.
