= Pierre Noël Lecauchois =

French lawyer (1740–1788)

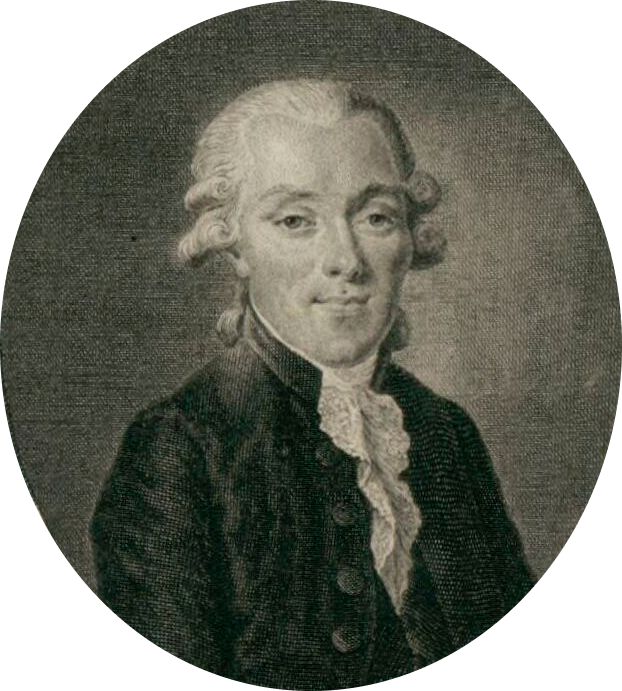
- Engraving of Lecauchois in 1786
- Born: 1740; Rouen, Normandy, Kingdom of France
- Died: 14 February 1788 (aged 47–48)
- Occupation: Lawyer
- Known for: Proving Marie Salmon's innocence and preventing her torture and execution

Pierre Noël Lecauchois (Note: His last name was also written as "Le Cauchois".) (1740 – 14 February 1788) was a French lawyer from Rouen. He defended and exonerated the wrongfully accused, many of whom were sentenced to be tortured and executed under the harsh criminal code of the ancien régime.

Lecauchois is best known for defending Marie Salmon, who was sentenced to be burned at the stake for a poisoning that she did not commit. With the help of Parisian lawyer Jean-François Fournel, Lecauchois succeeded in proving Salmon's innocence.

== Early career ==
Lecauchois was born in Rouen in 1740. He joined the bar association for the Parlement de Rouen in 1776, registering under the Latin name Petrus Natalis.

Early in his career, Lecauchois's successful defense of soldiers in two major criminal cases earned him notoriety. In the first case in 1763, he helped acquit and reinstate Jean-Louis Savary, who was wrongfully convicted of kidnapping and theft. The following year in 1764, he obtained a pardon for the soldier Le Cannu, (Note: Or "Le Canut") who was sentenced to life on the galleys for striking his quartermaster.

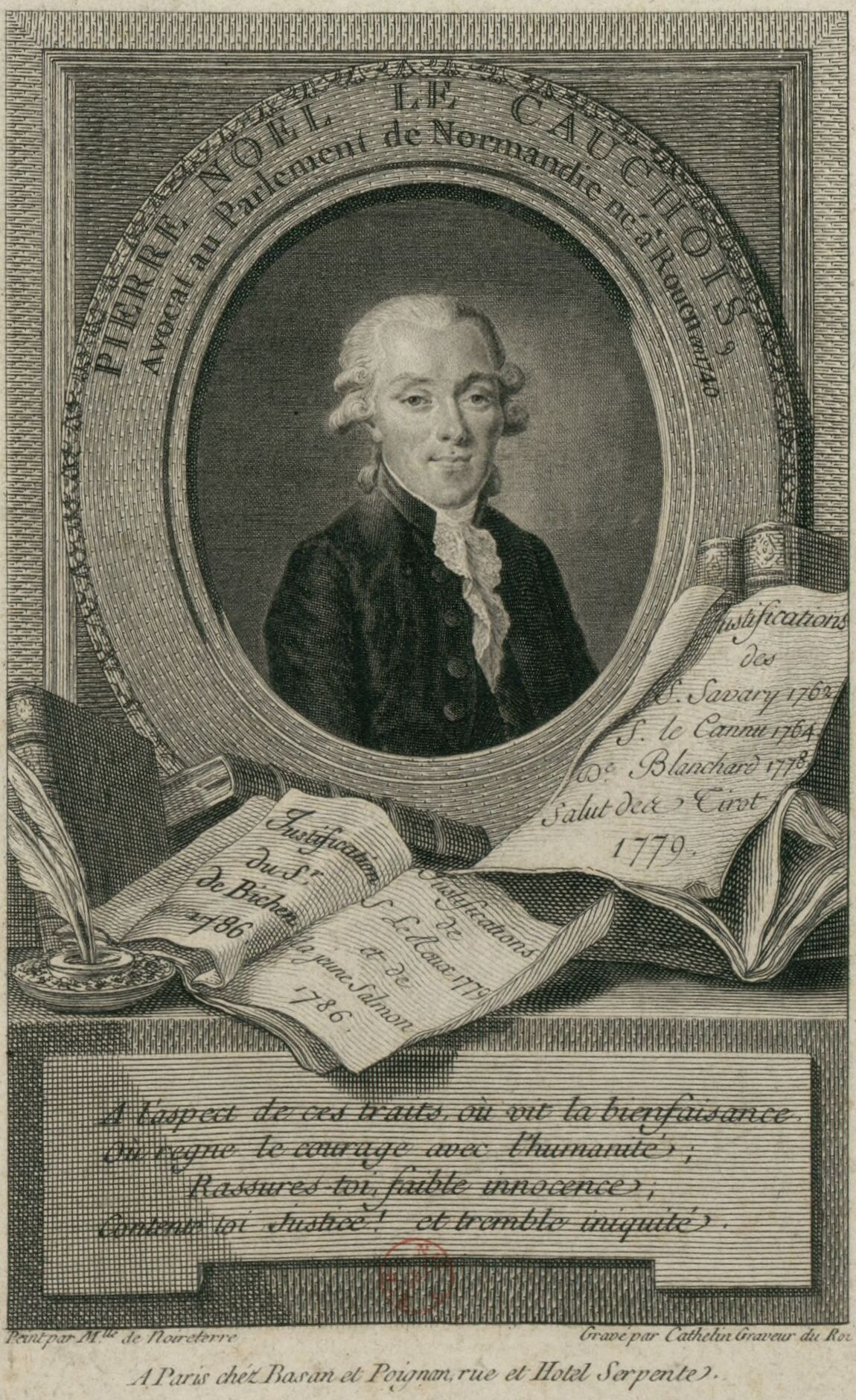
Engraving of Lecauchois with the names of his clients written below his portrait

In 1778, Lecauchois helped exonerate Madame Blanchard, a midwife accused of performing abortions. Later, in 1779, he helped commute a sentence from the death penalty to life on the galleys for a bailiff named Tirot, which allowed Tirot's pregnant wife and twelve children to receive his confiscated assets. Lecauchois also helped free a surgeon named Le Roux, who was sentenced to death for poisoning. In 1782, he took up the case of Marie Salmon, a young domestic servant who was wrongfully convicted of poisoning, murder, and theft.

In 1786, Marie-Thérèse de Noireterre painted and Louis-Jacques Cathelin engraved a portrait of Lecauchois in honor of his work. The names of his clients—Savary, Le Cannu, Blanchard, Tirot, Le Roux, and Salmon—are written below his portrait, as well as an inscription that reads:

A l'aspect de ces traits, où vit la bienfaisance, Où regne le courage avec l'humanité ; Rassures-toi, faible innocence ; Contente-toi justice ! et tremble iniquité.

In aspect of these features, where benevolence lives, where courage reigns alongside humanity; Reassure yourself, fragile innocence! Be content, justice! And tremble, inequity.

== Innocence of Marie Salmon ==
=== Stay of execution ===
In 1782, Lecauchois received a letter from two prison confessors in Caen, asking him to review the case of a young domestic servant named Marie Salmon. Salmon had been convicted of domestic theft and fatally poisoning her employer's grandfather, Paysant de Beaulieu, and she was condemned to be tortured and then burned alive.

Lecauchois was convinced of Salmon's innocence and took on her case. He then obtained an official stay of execution on her behalf. However, due to delays in transferring documents, news of the court order did not reach Caen until a few days before Salmon was scheduled to be killed. He enlisted Jean-François Fournel, a member of the Parlement of Paris, to help defend Salmon.

=== Retrial and exoneration ===
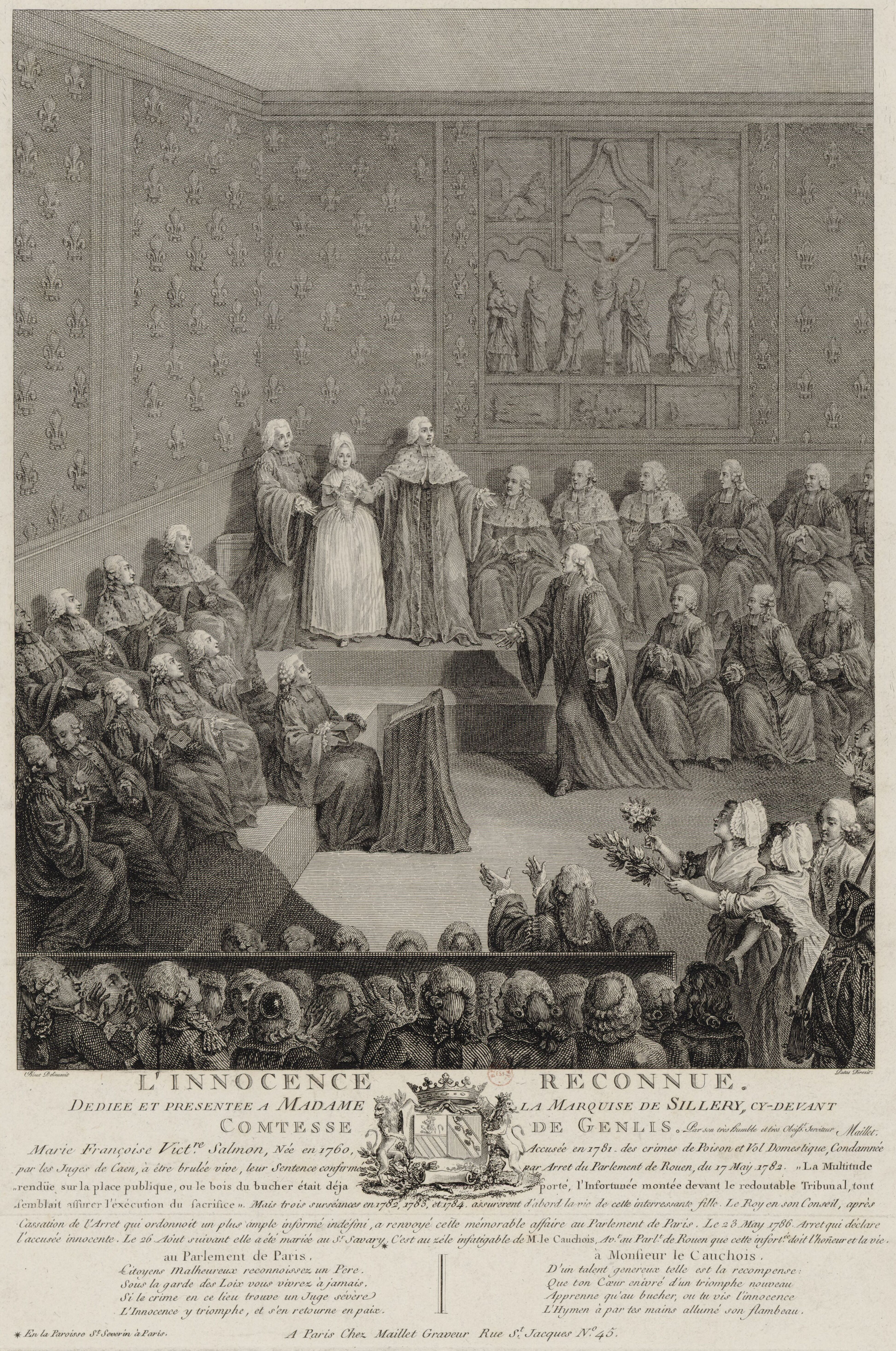
Engraving prepared for Madame de Genlis in 1786 showing Lecauchois standing beside Salmon and pleading her case

Lecauchois wrote two memoires judiciaires (transl. legal briefs) about Salmon's case: Justification de Marie-Françoise-Victoire Salmon and Addition à la Justification de Marie-Françoise-Victoire Salmon. He published them in 1786 with the help of Parisian publisher Cailleau and distributed them to the general public. Mémoires at the time were typically given to the judge to present a client's defense, but, in situations with a high profile case like Salmon's, the mémoires were also very popular and sought after by the public. Lecauchois sought to sway public opinion in support of Salmon's innocence while also connecting her unjust victimization by the criminal justice system to the broader movement for judicial reforms at the time.

In his memoires judiciaires, Lecauchois presented an emotionally compelling first-person narrative from Salmon's perspective to "play up [her] candor and vulnerability." He cited many irregularities in Salmon's original trial and accused the prosecutor of conducting a hasty and flawed investigation. He also speculated that some individuals involved in the initial investigation had planted evidence against Salmon.

The Parlement of Rouen took 28 months to review Salmon's original case and order a new trial, then it took another 18 months for the previous decision to be overturned. Finally, the case was brought before the Parlement of Paris, and, on 23 May 1786, after over four years in prison, Salmon was fully acquitted of all charges. Lecauchois accompanied her out of the Palais de Justice as a large crowd cheered. Salmon's wrongful conviction became a symbol of the harsh criminal justice system of the ancien régime.

=== Freedom ===
In the months following her exoneration, Lecauchois and Salmon were invited to meet with nobility and celebrities, including King Louis XVI and Queen consort Marie Antoinette, Madame de Genlis, and Cagliostro. Lecauchois was so moved by their meeting with Madame de Genlis and the princes of the House of Orléans that he published a manuscript entitled Détail sur la fille Salmon (transl. Detail about the Salmon girl) describing the scene. Lecauchois was celebrated for his victory, with engravings printed with his likeness and a long epistle published in L'Année littéraire. The attorney general and members of his order released formal declarations celebrating him, and the Académie Française awarded him the prix de vertu (transl. prize for virtue).

Madame de Genlis arranged for Salmon to marry the soldier Jean-Louis Savary, who Lecauchois had helped free in 1763. Both Salmon and Savary consented to the marriage, and Lecauchois attended the ceremony. The House of Orléans provided a trousseau and a carriage for the bride.

In 1787, Lecauchois was called upon to defend Salmon again when slanderous rumors circulated about her, falsely accusing her of poisoning her husband. He wrote a letter to the editor of L'Année littéraire and adamantly defended her.

== Illness and death ==
Less than 2 years after exonerating Marie Salmon, Lecauchois suffered from a sudden illness and died on 14 February 1788. Salmon blamed his detractors for hastening his end, writing in a letter to the Mercure de France journal:

Ses ennemis se contenteront sans doute de la secrette joie de l'avoir conduit au tombeau dans un âge si peu avancé.
His enemies will be content with the secret joy of having led him to the grave at such a young age.

Salmon was deeply saddened by the death of Lecauchois, who she called "mon défenseur et mon libérateur" (transl. "my defender and my liberator"). Others celebrated his life and career with a memorial poem in L'Année littéraire.
