= Jean-François Fournel =

French lawyer and jurist (1745–1820)

- Born: 1745; Paris, Kingdom of France
- Died: July 21, 1820 (aged 74–75)
- Occupations: Lawyer; jurist

Jean-François Fournel (1745 – 21 July 1820) was a French lawyer, jurist, and member of the Parlement de Paris.

== Biography ==
=== Early career ===
Fournel was born in Paris and came from a family with connections to the legal and judicial spheres in that city. He joined the Ordre des avocats de Paris (transl. Paris Bar Association) in 1771 when he was approximately 27 years-old. He was known to write legal briefs and rarely pleaded cases in court.

=== Exoneration of Marie Salmon ===
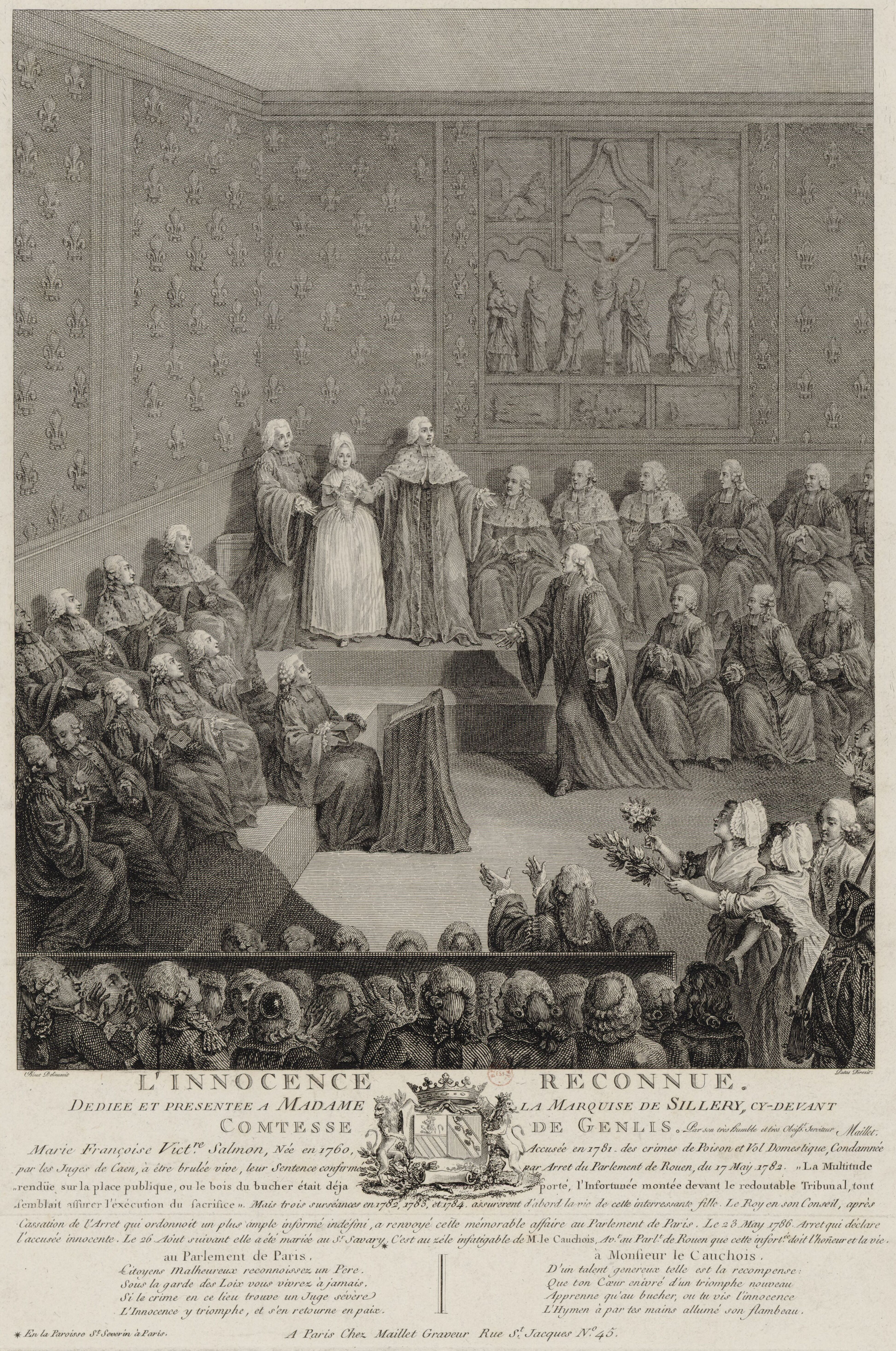
Engraving prepared for Madame de Genlis in 1786 which depicts Marie Salmon praying as her lawyers plead her case

In 1786, Fournel worked with Rouen lawyer Pierre Noël Lecauchois to exonerate Marie Salmon, a young domestic servant who was wrongfully convicted of fatally poisoning her employer and was sentenced to be tortured and burned alive. Fournel and Lecauchois successfully argued her innocence in widely circulated legal briefs printed by Parisian publisher Cailleau.

After Salmon's exoneration, Fournel's legal brief, Consultation pour une jeune fille condamnée à être brûlée vive (transl. Consultation for a young girl condemned to be burned alive), was read at the Vatican, and the Pope named him a Knight of the Golden Spur.

=== French Revolution and beyond ===
Fournel was not supportive of the French Revolution. During the years of the revolution, he retired from public life and spent his time writing and collecting documents to publish later. When Napoleon came to power and established the Napoleonic Code in 1804, Fournel returned to practicing law and published numerous works of legal scholarship and case law.

In March 1816, Fournel was elected president of the Ordre des avocats de Paris. He died on 21 July 1820.

== Works ==
An incomplete list of books and legal briefs written by Jean-François Fournel:

- Traité de l'adultère considéré dans l'ordre judiciaire, 1778
- Traité de la séduction considérée dans l'ordre judiciaire, 1781
- Consultation pour une jeune fille condamnée à être brûlée vive, 1786
- Dictionnaire raisonné, ou Exposition par ordre alphabétique, des lois sur les transactions entre particuliers, 1797
- Analyse raisonnée de la loi du 27 Thermidor an VI, 1798
- Traité du voisinage, considéré dans l'ordre judiciaire et administratif, 1812
- Histoire des avocats au Parlement et du barreau de Paris depuis S. Louis jusqu'au 15 octobre 1790s, 1813
- Histoire du barreau de Paris dans le cours de la Révolution, 1816
