= Louis-Jacques Cathelin =

French engraver

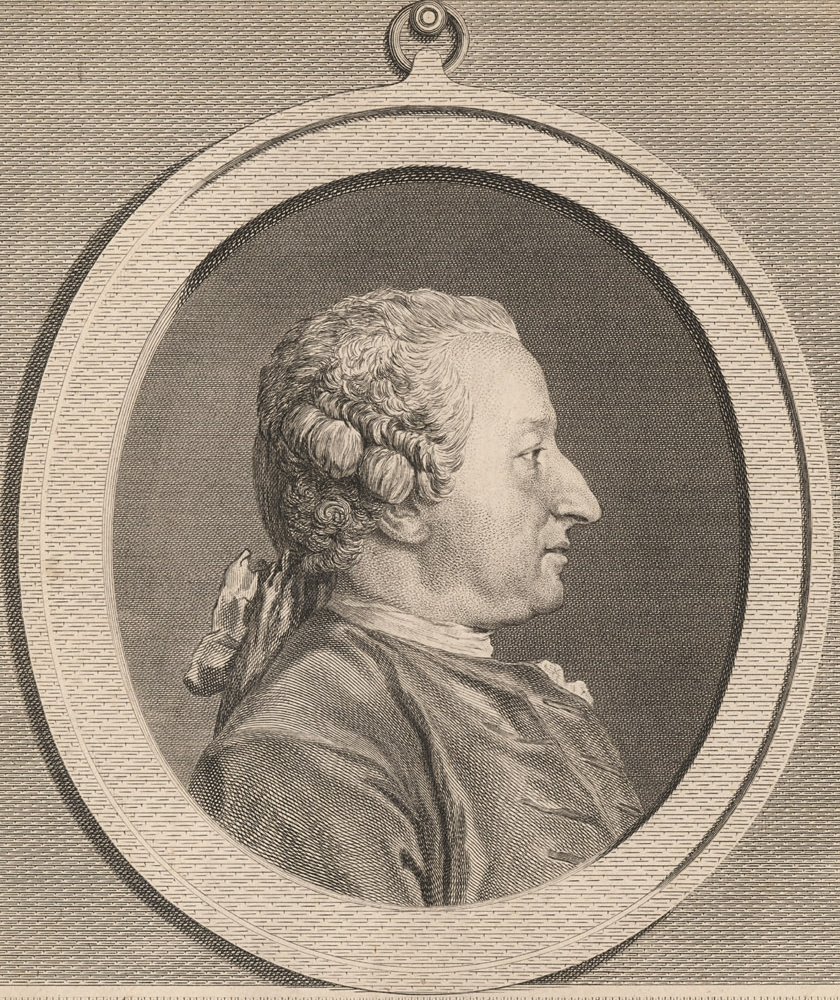
Alexis Clairaut, engraving by Charles-Nicolas Cochin and Cathelin, c. 1770.

Louis-Jacques Cathelin (1738–1804) was a French engraver.

== Life ==
Cathelin was born in Paris in 1738. He was one of the best pupils of Le Bas. He engraved some excellent small portraits of historical personages, literary men, and artists; and, although his work was singularly unequal, he may be classed with Le Mire, Ficquet, Gaucher, and other engravers of the 18th century, who were distinguished by the skill and delicacy of their work. He was received into the Academy in 1777, on which occasion he executed the portrait of the Abbé Terray, after Roslin. Cathelin died at Paris in 1804.

== Works ==
Among his best works are the following:

=== Portraits ===
- Louis XV; after Van Loo.
- Marie Antoinette, Queen of France; after Frédou.
- The same; after Drouais.
- Countess of Artois; after the same.
- Countess of Provence; after the same.
- Molière; after Mignard.
- Pierre Noel Le Cauchois; after Mlle. de Noireterre.
- Jean Pâris de Monmartel; after M. Q. de La Tour.
- Louis Tocqué, painter; after Nattier.
- Stanislaus, King of Poland; after Massé.
- Joseph Vernet, marine painter; after Van Loo.
- Joseph II, Emperor of Germany; after Ducreux.
- Maria Theresa, Empress of Germany; after the same.

=== Various subjects ===
- La Nouvelle Affligeante; after P. A . Wille.
- The Death of Lucretia; after Pellegrini.
- Latona revenged; after Lauri; begun by Balechou, and finished by Cathelin.
- Erigone; after Monsiau.
- A Waterfall, with Fishermen; after J. Vernet.
- The Four Hours of the Day; after the same.
