= François Joullain =

French etcher, engraver and art dealer

- Born: François Charles Joullain; 1697; France
- Died: 1778 (aged 80–81); France
- Education: Académie de Saint-Luc
- Known for: etcher, engraver, editor, publisher, art dealer and art collector
- Notable work: Études prises dans le bas peuple ou les Cris de Paris, 1737 (editor and publisher)

François Joullain (1697–1778) was a French etcher, engraver and art dealer. His career and that of his son, François-Charles Joullain (died 1790), expanded from their initial roles as engravers and printmakers to merchants of paintings and publishers. He became a noted publisher for producing books of engravings which were of high quality and very popular in the 18th century and a prominent art dealer in Paris.

== Life and career ==
François Joullain began his career as an engraver, etcher and print-maker. He received some of his early art education from the engraver, Claude Gillot and was entered as a member the Académie de Saint-Luc, 13 August 1733, as an engraver, and became its director, 19 October 1747.

In his early career, he illustrated a number of books, sometimes in collaboration with other engravers, especially his former teacher, Claude Gillot. In around 1827, he provided three engravings for Coypel's edition of Don Quixote alongside many other engravers. Once established as an engraver, he began to receive commissions as the sole illustrator. He was commissioned by Luigi Riccoboni to execute the illustrations for Historie du Theatre Italien (1730). For this, he produced a series depicting Riccoboni's own comic actors as the appeared on the stage at the time and also added images of historical counterparts. Joullain's approach, which juxtaposed images of the ancient and the modern, were copied extensively by later illustrators.

In the 18th-century, books of lithographs were becoming increasingly popular. Joullain seized this opportunity to abandon his career as engraver and illustrator, for the more lucrative practice of printseller and dealer in old master drawings. Between 1728 and 1739 he entered into a publishing partnership with Nicolas Gautrot. His publishing activities were noted for producing books of high quality engravings which were very popular in the 18th century.

In 1737, he published the first volume in a series entitled, Cris de Paris with engravings by Edmé Bouchardon. This work, published in five parts between 1737 and 1746, consisted of 60 engraved plates featuring images of street vendors and details of their characteristic, melodic cries, was highly popular and represented one of the earliest examples of books devoted to documenting the sights and sounds of everyday street life in European capital cities. By the 19th-century, so many titles had been devoted to the subject of street cries that such works were described as a distinct genre.

From around 1750, he operated auctioneer's rooms at the address: Quai de la Mégisserie à la Ville de Rome, Paris. His stock, which consisted of prints, was valued at 44,000 livres in 1762. His son supplied frames.

In his later life, he became a noted collector of engravings and copper plates, and maintained a collection of considerable size. For instance, he purchased four volumes of a work dedicated to documenting historical fashions with engravings by Dezallier, in an effort to avoid having the collection broken up for resale. He also operated as an art dealer and maintained a modest stock of paintings and engravings. He also purchased the copper plates, used to illustrate a Bible, from the heir of the wealthy banker, Everhard Jabach.

When his son Charles Joullain married Catherine Louise Leclerc, the daughter of Sébastien Leclerc (1676-1763), his father transferred to him the portion of his business that dealt with frames. His son later assumed the name François-Charles Joullain and became one of the most important dealers of the second half of the 18th century. His son authored the book, Réflexions sur la peinture et la gravure, (Reflections on Painting and Engraving) in 1786. Finally, his son was instrumental in establishing a systematic approach to the documentation of artworks with Répertoire de tableaux: dessins et estampes, ouvrage utile aux amateurs (1783); a work in which he started to record the prices and provenances of major paintings sold in the previous decade, but left unfinished. However, he followed up with a more detailed version in 1786.

Joullain printseller, was mentioned in Horace Walpole's correspondence with the marquise du Deffand.

== Work ==
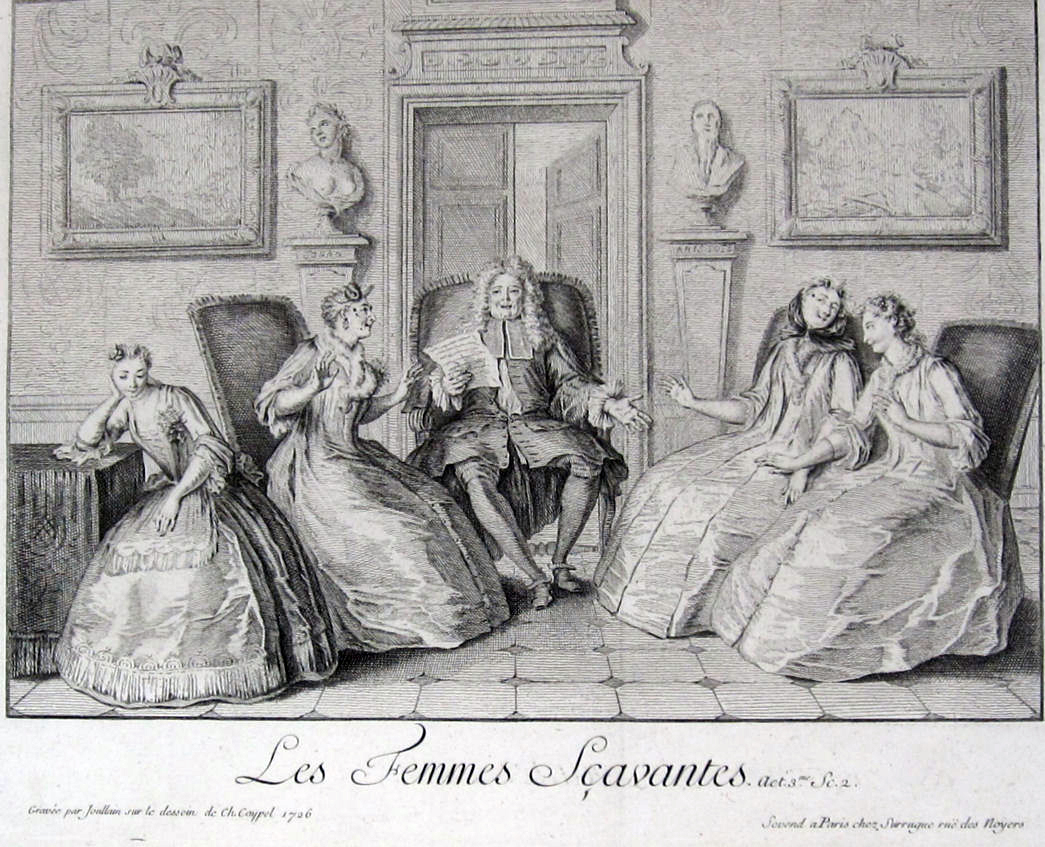
Les Femmes savantes, 1726 [Design by Coypel; engraving by Joullain]

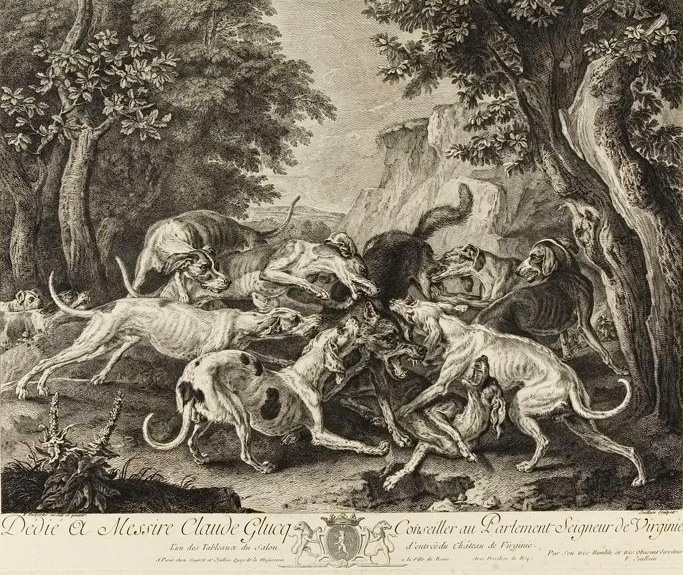
Sport date unknown

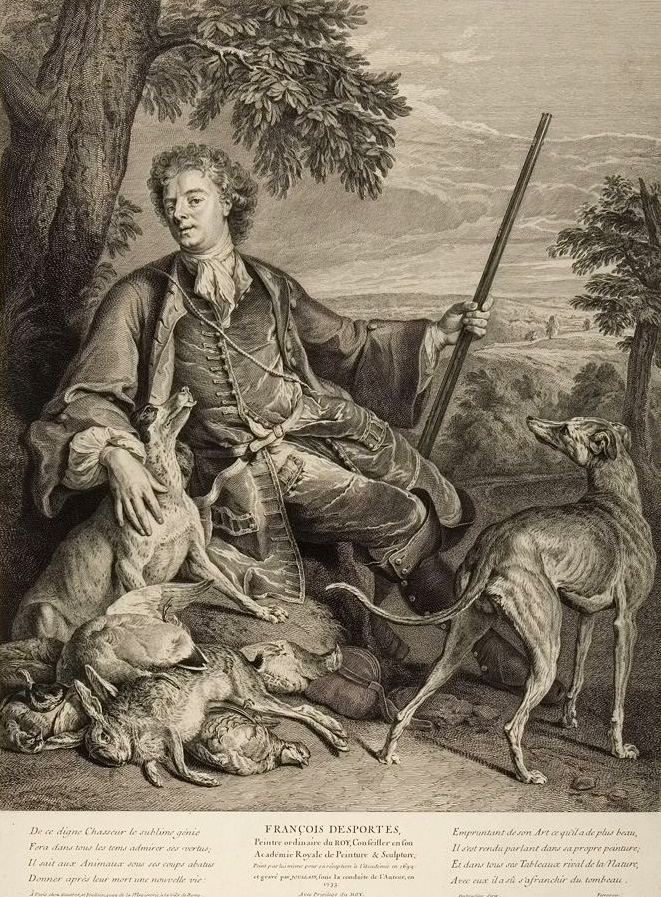
Despot, date unknown, P., Le Commerce du tableau à Paris dans la seconde moitié du XVIIIe siècle.

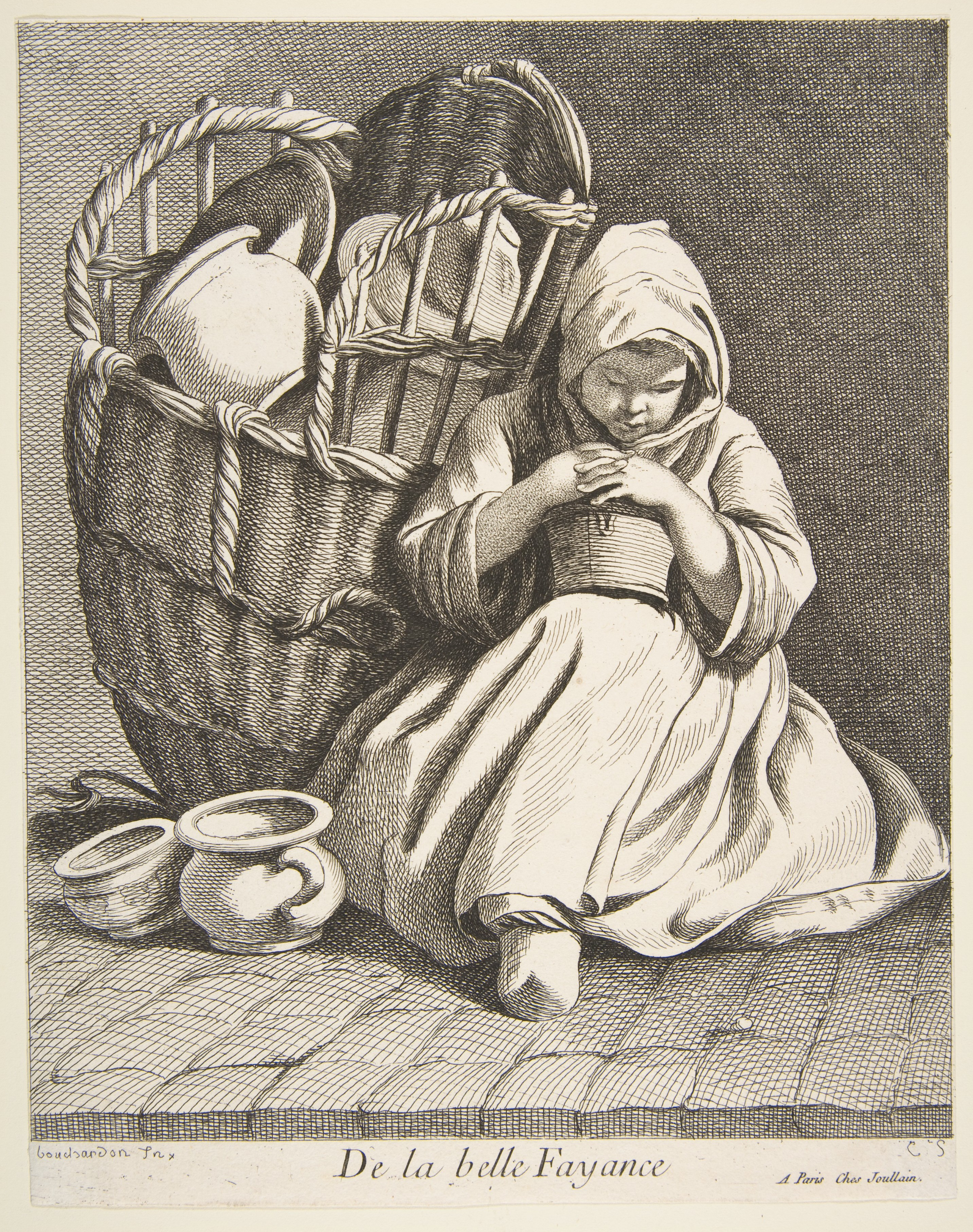
The Pottery Seller, from Cris de Paris, 1737 [Etching by Bouchard; edited and published by Joullain]

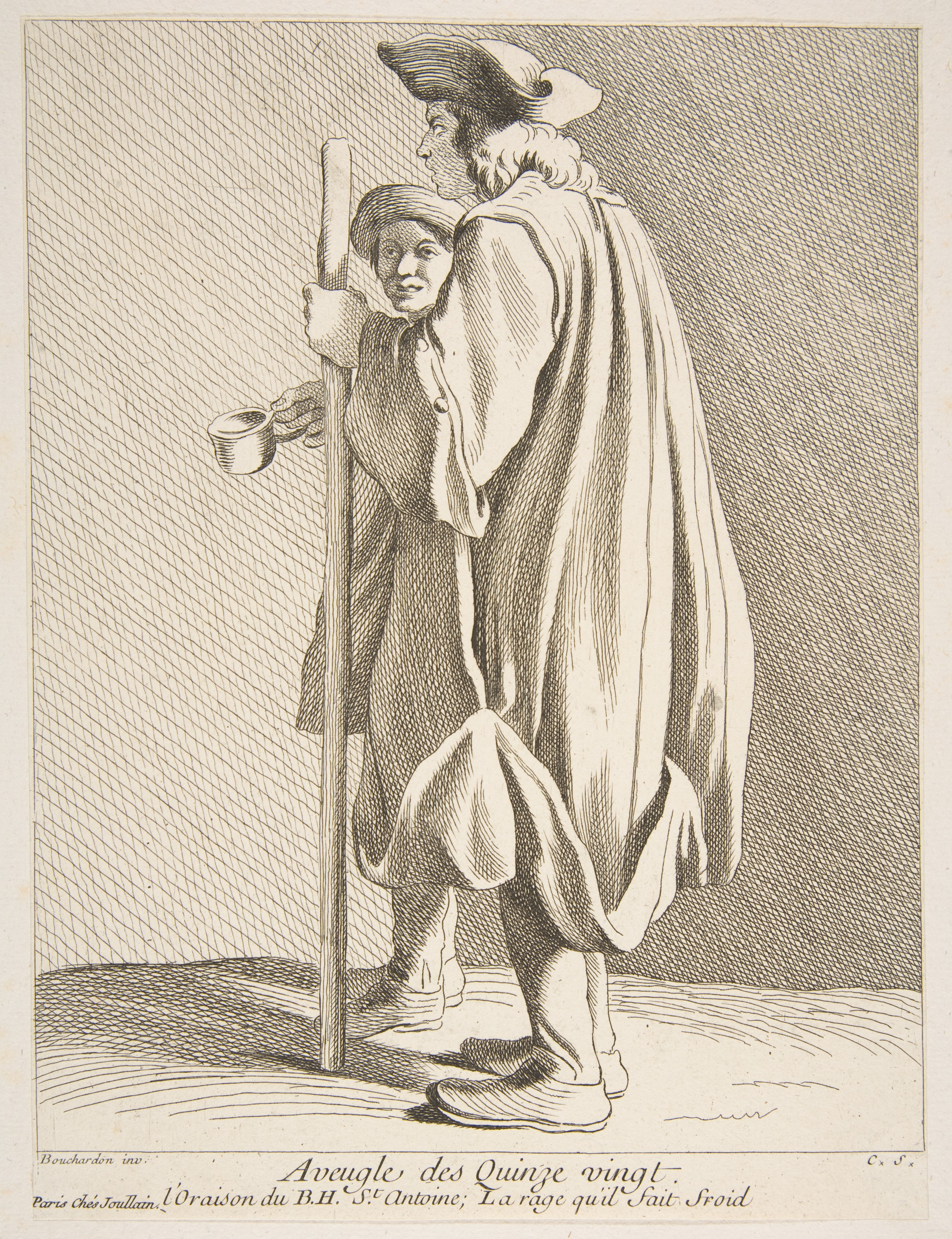
A Blind Man from the Quinze-Vingts Hospital, 1738

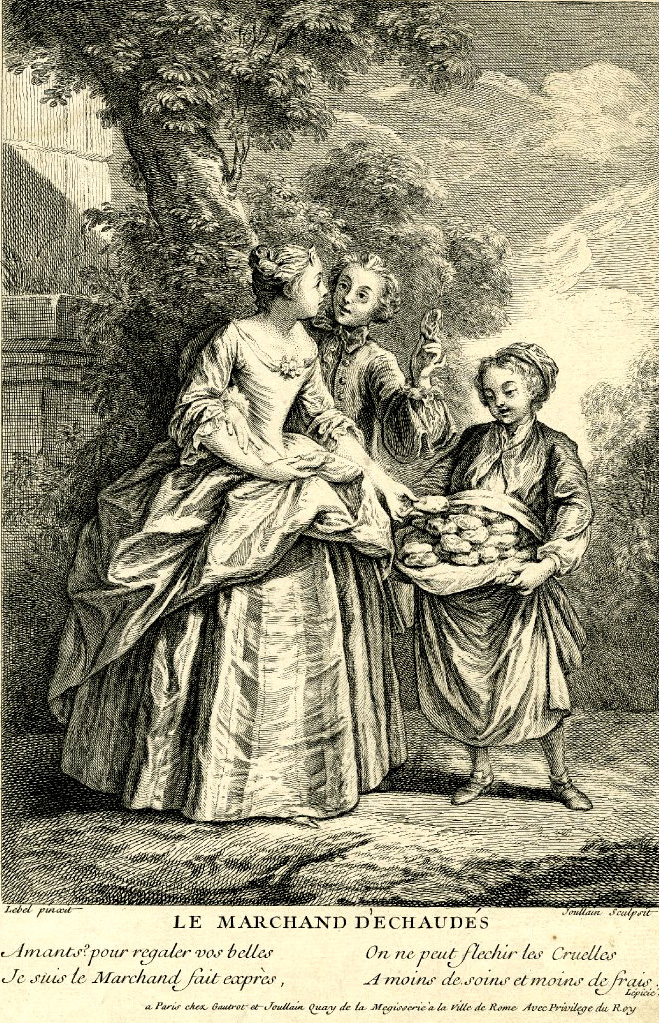
The Trader, 1760

Notable publications

- Historie du Theatre Italien, [illustrations by François Joullain], 1730
- Nouveaux dessins d'habillements à l'usage des ballets operas et comedies, (trans. New designs for costumes) By François Joullain and Claude Gillot (1673–1722), c. 1721
- Études prises dans le bas peuple ou les Cris de Paris (roughly translated as Studies Taken of the lower people or the Cries of Paris), Paris, 1737 [With engravings by Bouchardon and published by Joullain]
- Catalogue D'une Riche Collection De Tableaux, De Peintures À Gouazze & Au Pastel, De Desseins Précieus Montés Et Non-Montés; D'estampes Choisies En Feuilles & En Receuils; Le Tout Des Trois Écoles, by François Joullain

== See also ==
- Peddler
- Street cries

== Bibliography ==
- Guiffrey, Jules (1915). Les Artistes parisiens du XVIe et du XVIIe siècles: Donations, contrats de mariage, testaments, inventaires....
- Hellyer, M.-E. (1996). "Joullain, François", vol. 17, pp. 667–668, in The Dictionary of Art, edited by Jane Turner, London: Macmillan.
- Michel, Patrick (2007). Le Commerce du tableau à Paris dans la seconde moitié du XVIIIe siècle.
- Walpole, Horace; Lewis, Wilmarth S., editor (1937). Horace Walpole's Correspondence with Madame du Deffand. Yale Edition of Horace Walpole's correspondence, vol. 6.
