= Sarah Maza =

American historian

- Occupations: Historian, professor, writer

Academic background
- Education: Université de Provence, Licence-ès-Lettres, 1973; Princeton University, M.A. in History, 1975; Princeton University, Ph.D. in History, 1978
- Academic advisors: Robert Darnton, Princeton
- Influences: Natalie Zemon Davis; Michel Vovelle

Academic work
- Discipline: History
- Institutions: Northwestern University; École des Hautes Études en Sciences Sociales

Sarah Maza is an American historian of early modern and modern France who specializes in social, political, and cultural history. She taught history at Northwestern University before retiring with professor emerita status in 2024.

== Biography ==
Sarah Maza grew up in Aix-en-Provence, France. She earned her Licence-és-Lettres from the Université de Provence in 1973, where she studied with notable Marxist historian of the French Revolution, Michel Vovelle. She pursued her postgraduate degrees in history at Princeton and was advised by Robert Darnton.

Maza began her career at Northwestern University as a professor in 1978. She served as chair of the department from 2001-2004 and 2008-2009 and as associate chair from 2016-2017 and 2020-2021. In 2024, she retired with professor emerita status.

== Scholarship ==
=== French history ===
Maza's first book, Servants and Masters in Eighteenth-Century France (1983), examines how the relationship between domestic servants and their masters evolved in the lead-up to the French Revolution. Her work is praised for covering both the shifting roles and, more specifically, "aristocratic domesticity in the Old Regime itself", with its "wasteful display" that served to dominate the lower classes rather than show off wealth. She goes on to describe how shifting expectations from new bourgeois masters "feminized" domesticity, transforming it from an aristocratic performance of wealth and power into a intimate role focused on family and privacy.

In 1993, Maza published Private Lives and Public Affairs: The Causes Célèbres of Prerevolutionary France about popular political scandals and crimes in the Kingdom of France in the 18th century, including the prosecution and exoneration of Marie Salmon, the Affair of the Diamond Necklace, and the institutionalization of the Comte de Sanois. She explores how 18th-century defense lawyers in these high-profile cases — or causes célèbres — addressed the public directly via widely-circulated mémoires judiciaires (transl. legal briefs) written in a dramatic literary style that compared "virtuous commoners" with "corrupt aristocrats" of the ancien régime. In addition to defending their clients, Maza argues that these lawyers, through their published mémoires, were "rais[ing] pointed questions about social reform" while also inviting the public to criticize and weigh circumstances of these cases themselves. Maza's analysis is influenced by Habermas' research into the emergence of the public sphere in the 18th century, and Private Lives and Public Affairs is cited as an example of "new cultural historicism."

The Myth of the French Bourgeoisie: An Essay on the Social Imaginary, 1750-1850 (2003) is considered one of Maza's more controversial works. Central to her thesis is the idea that "identity [is constructed] through the stories [people] tell about themselves" and that the act of naming, in particular, is powerful. To that end, she notes that no group ever called themselves bourgeoisie, and, instead, people deployed the label against others to denigrate them. Furthermore, she argues that the bourgeoisie as a unified class is a myth created, in part, by modern historians.

In Violette Nozière: A Story of Murder in 1930s Paris (2011), Maza shares a case from the interwar period of France about an 18-year old girl named Violette Nozière, who was accused of murdering her father and attempting to kill her mother. Maza explores how and why Nozière's case became a "national obsession" in France. Vogue described the book as "grittily cinematic." Judith Warner wrote in her New York Times review that Maza provides a "richly layered cultural history" and "skillfully analyzes Violette’s transformation from wretched schoolgirl to cultural icon"

=== History as a discipline ===
External video
- The Ever-Changing Past, May 3, 2021, American History TV via C-SPAN. Forum about revisionist history, featuring Sarah Maza as a panelist and hosted by The Wilson Center and National History Center

In Thinking about History (2017), Maza provides an introduction to the academic field of history and writing about the past. Her book explores "the necessary tension between academic and popular history," as well as the importance of academic debates around historiography.

== Awards ==
- 2021 – The William Koren Jr. Prize from the Society for French Historical Studies for "Toy Stories: Poupées, culture matérielle et imaginaire de classe dans la France du XIXe siècle"
- 2004 – The George L. Mosse Prize from the American Historical Association for The Myth of the French Bourgeoisie
- 1998 – The Chester Higby Prize from the American Historical Association for "Luxury, Morality, and Social Change: Why There Was No Middle-Class Consciousness in Prerevolutionary France"
- 1994 - Guggenheim Fellowship
- 1993 – The David Pinkney Prize from the Society of French Historical Studies for Private Lives and Public Affairs: The Causes Celebres of Prerevolutionary France
- 1984 – National Endowment for the Humanities Fellowship
