= François-Charles Joullain =

French art dealer

- Born: François Charles Joullain c.1734 France
- Died: 1790; France
- Known for: engraver, framer, art dealer and author
- Notable work: Réflexions sur la peinture et la gravure,1786

François-Charles Joullain (c. 1734 – 1790) was a French art dealer, son of François Joullain, a respected 18th century engraver, publisher and art dealer. The careers of the father and son as merchants of paintings expanded from their roles as printmakers, editors and printsellers.

== Life and career ==
François-Charles Joullain, born in about 1734, was the eldest son of a successful French engraver, art dealer and publisher, François Joullain. The careers of father and son were closely intertwined. Initially, Joullain assisted his father with in his auctioneer's business in Paris. When Charles Joullain married Catherine Louise Leclerc, the daughter of Sébastien Leclerc (1676-1763) in around 1756, his father transferred to him the portion of his business that dealt with frames and he supplied his father with frames for his auctioneer's rooms at Quai de la Mégisserie à la Ville de Rome, Paris. After his father's death in 1778, he continued to run the family business and became one of the most prominent art dealers in Paris in the second half of the 18th century.

Charles Joullain assumed the name François-Charles Joullain to distinguish himself from the practice with his father in which he had long been closely associated. He was reckoned one of the outstanding experts in the art market of his day. He was one of the experts called in to catalogue the works of art of Abel-François Poisson, marquis de Marigny, the brother of Mme de Pompadour and one of the most enlightened patrons of the day.

Joullain printseller, was mentioned in Horace Walpole's correspondence with the marquise du Deffand.

== Work ==
Francois-Charles Joullain was the author of three works which serve the historian of the art market as a guide to auction house practices in the 18th century: his Répertoire de tableaux, dessins et estampes, ouvrage utile aux amateurs, 1783, his Variation de prix concernant les tableaux, 1786, and above all his Reflexions sur la peinture et la gravure, accompagnées d'une courte dissertation sur le commerce de la curiosité et les ventes en général, Metz, 1786. Joullain was a pioneer of the way that paintings were valued with his Répertoire de tableaux: dessins et estampes, ouvrage utile aux amateurs (1783); a work in which he recorded the prices and provenances of major paintings sold in the previous decade. In this regard, Joullain built on the earlier work of Edmé-François Gersaint (1694–1750) who was the first French art dealer to introduce detailed Catalogs with descriptions of the work and biographies of the artist. Joullain's contribution was to compile the first index that documented provenance and the prices paintings had fetched at auctions. He followed up with a more detailed version in 1786. These two indexes had a major impact on the role of the dealer in the valuation process. Whereas art historians and curators were responsible for evaluating a painting's merit, the dealer was responsible for evaluating a work's provenance. Thus, the role of the dealer was elevated beyond a reseller, and transformed into that of an expert.

=== Publications ===
- Répertoire de tableaux: dessins et estampes, ouvrage utile aux amateurs [Unfinished] (1783)
- Réflexions sur la peinture et la gravure, (Reflections on Painting and Engraving) in 1786
- Variation de prix concernant les tableaux, 1786

== Bibliography ==
- Gordon, Alden R.; Carolyne Ayçaguer-Ron; Maria Leilani Gilbert; Elizabeth A. Spatz; Patricia A. Teter (2003). The Houses and Collections of the Marquis de Marigny.
- Guiffrey, Jules (1915). Les Artistes parisiens du XVIe et du XVIIe siècles: Donations, contrats de mariage, testaments, inventaires....
- Hellyer, M.-E. (1996). "Joullain, François", vol. 17, pp. 667–668, in The Dictionary of Art, edited by Jane Turner, London: Macmillan.
- Jaffé, Michael (1994). "Two Rediscovered Antwerp Drawings from Crozat's Collection", Master Drawings, vol. 32, no. 1 (Spring 1994).
- Michel, Patrick (2007). Le Commerce du tableau à Paris dans la seconde moitié du XVIIIe siècle.
- Walpole, Horace; Lewis, Wilmarth S., editor (1937). Horace Walpole's Correspondence with Madame du Deffand. Yale Edition of Horace Walpole's correspondence, vol. 6.
