= Louis-André de Grimaldi =

French nobleman and bishop

- Bishop of Noyon
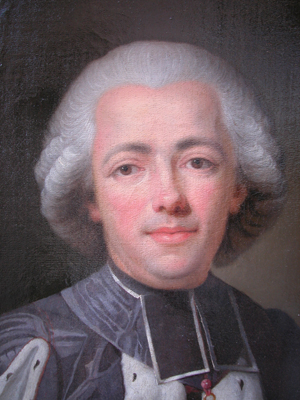
- Church: Catholic Church
- Diocese: Diocese of Noyon
- In office: 30 March 1778 – 28 December 1804
- Predecessor: Charles de Broglie
- Successor: Diocese suppressed
- Previous post: Bishop of Le Mans (1767-1777)

Orders
- Consecration: 5 July 1767 by Alexandre Angélique de Talleyrand-Périgord

Personal details
- Born: Louis-André Grimaldi d'Antibes; 17 December 1736 Cagnes, County of Provence, Kingdom of France
- Died: 28 December 1804 (aged 68) London, England, United Kingdom of Great Britain and Ireland

Louis-André Grimaldi d'Antibes (17 December 1736 – 28 December 1804) was a French nobleman and bishop. He was one of the Princes of Monaco, Bishop of Le Mans, then a Peer of France as Count-Bishop of Noyon from 1777 and bishop emeritus after he resigned from the post of bishop. He spent his later years in London. He was described as "a Voltairean prelate".

== Biography ==
Grimaldi was born on 17 December 1736 into the noble House of Grimaldi of Monaco as lord of Cagnes and Antibes, in the château of Cagnes, in southeastern France. He was the son of Honoré IV Grimaldi, Marquis de Cagnes and Hélène-de-Orcel Plaisians, and belonged to the ancient nobility of France, descended from the House of Bourbon.

Grimaldi became Vicar General of the Archbishop of Rouen. He was appointed bishop of Le Mans on 5 July 1767, after which he began a series of unpopular 'improvements', such as sweeping away the high altar and selling the Medieval and Renaissance silver without making an inventory of it. A portrait painted by Charles-Étienne Gaucher was hung in the vestry when he left Le Mans in 1777.

On 16 October 1777, Pope Pius VI appointed Grimaldi as Bishop of Noyon; he was also Count of Noyon. Charles-Maurice de Talleyrand-Périgord was ordained to the priesthood by Grimaldi. Years later, when Talleyrand was Bishop of Autun in Burgundy from November 1788, he was sworn in by Grimaldi under a papal order on 4 January 1789 as the Bishop of Noyon in the chapel of Saint-Sauveur de la Solitude, a retreat attached to the Seminary of St. Sulpice in Issy. The diocese of Noyon was abolished 12 July 1790.

In 1791, Louis Grimaldi refused the oath to the civil constitution of the clergy, and emigrated to England. He lived in London and the British government gave him a small pension until his death in London, 28 December 1804.

== Bibliography ==
- Gimpel, Jean (1983), The Cathedral Builders, Harper & Row, ISBN 978-0-06-091158-4
