= Jacques-Philippe Le Bas =

French engraver (1707–1783)

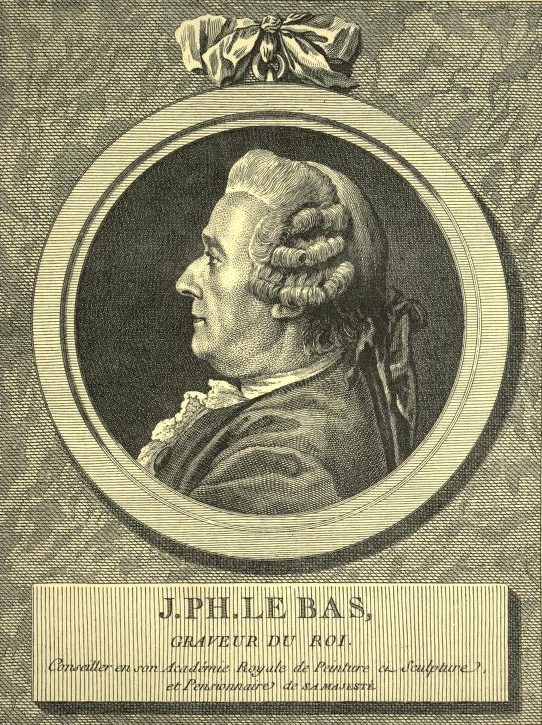
Portrait engraved by Louis-Jacques Cathelin, after Charles-Nicolas Cochin (1798)

Jacques-Philippe Le Bas, or Lebas (8 July 1707, Paris – 14 April 1783, Paris) was a French engraver, head of the largest engraving workshop in Paris during the 18th century.

== Life and work ==
His father was a wig-maker, and his family was very poor, so he was educated by his mother. When he showed some aptitude for drawing, she placed him in an apprenticeship with the architect and engraver, Antoine Hérisset He also received professional advice from Nicolas-Henri Tardieu, and was inspired by the works of Gérard Audran.

Through Tardieu, he met the financier and art collector, Pierre Crozat, who was engaged in a project to have all the paintings in his collection engraved. Le Bas was commissioned to provide some of them. In 1733, he was hired by Charles Parrocel to provide the chapter heading illustrations for L'école de Cavalerie, by François Robichon de la Guérinière. That same year, he married Élisabeth Duret.

Although very beautiful, she came without a dowry, so he suddenly found himself supporting his parents and hers. That was when he conceived the idea of establishing a training workshop. This became his primary source of income. His students included most of the famous engravers in France, as well as two Englishmen, Robert Strange and William Wynne Ryland, who were sent there by their government on a scholarship. He was considered to be a good-natured teacher, who never scolded anyone.

In 1735, the Académie Royale de Peinture et de Sculpture gave him permission to reproduce the works of its members. He was however, required to submit two portraits, for which he had little talent. He put it off as long as possible, finally submitting them in 1741. They were rejected, his permission was revoked, and he was prevented from becoming an "Engraver to the King". He convinced them to give him another chance, with another genre, received approval to do so, and submitted two "Conversations Galantes", after Nicolas Lancret. They were accepted, and he was admitted to the Académie in 1743. Thanks to a recommendation from Jean-Baptiste Descamps, he also became a member of the Académie des sciences, belles-lettres et arts de Rouen in 1748.

He became an official Advisor to the Académie Royale in 1771, which gave him the right to collect a pension. Élisabeth died in 1781, which left him a depressed state. His financial situation was also poor, due to some bad investments. In 1782, King Louis XVI appointed him Court Engraver to the Cabinet des Médailles, which helped somewhat. The last person to see him, his friend the art dealer, François-Charles Joullain, found him unable to fulfill his last commission. He died, aged seventy-five, in 1783.

== Selected works ==
- The works of mercy, large intaglio plate after David Teniers;
- L’Enfant prodigue, pendant to The Works of Pity, after Teniers;
- A follow-up to Fêtes de village, in intaglio;
- Le Sanglier féroce, large intaglio plate after Philips Wouwerman;
- La Chasse à l’italienne and le Pot au lait, two large intaglio plates after Wouvermans, as a pendant;
- Le Départ de la chasse; la Prise du héron, two intaglio plates as a pendant, after Carel Van Falens;
- Le Rendez-vous de chasse; l’Heureux Chasseur, two plates after the former;
- L’Alliance de Bacchus et de Venus, medium plate after Noël Nicolas Coypel

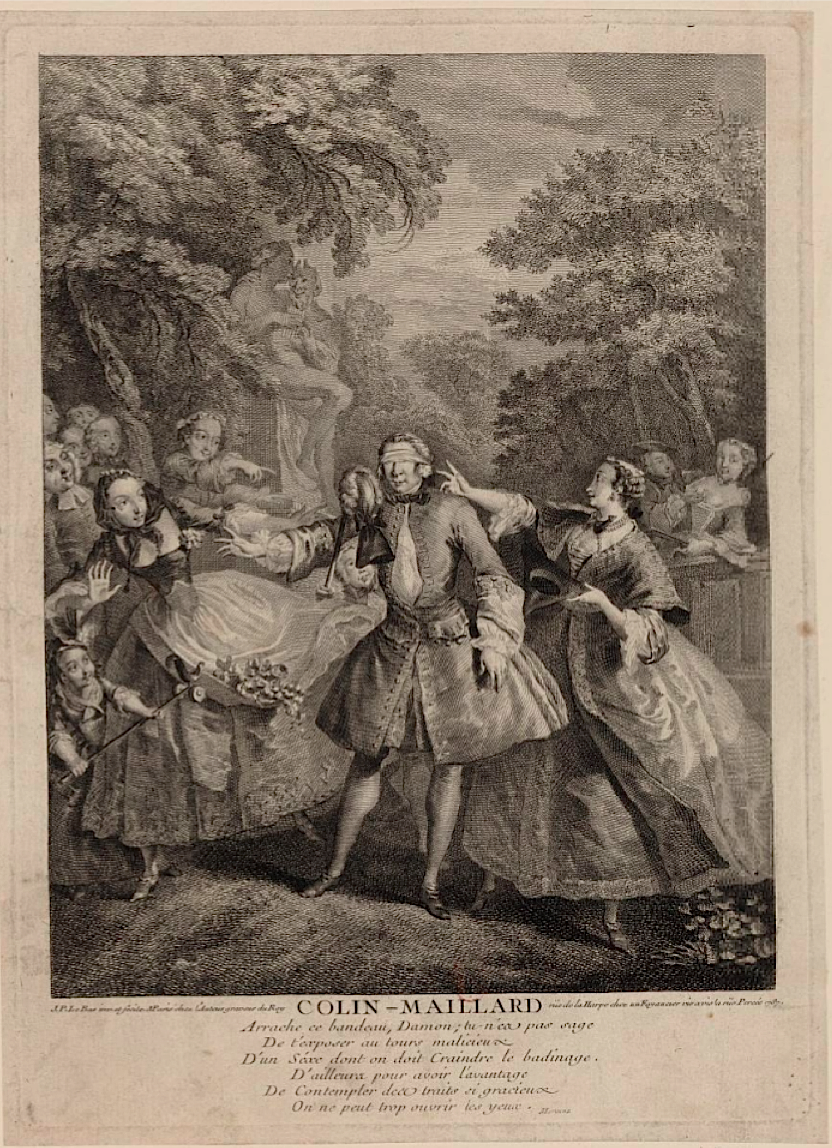
Blind man's buff; an original by Le Bas

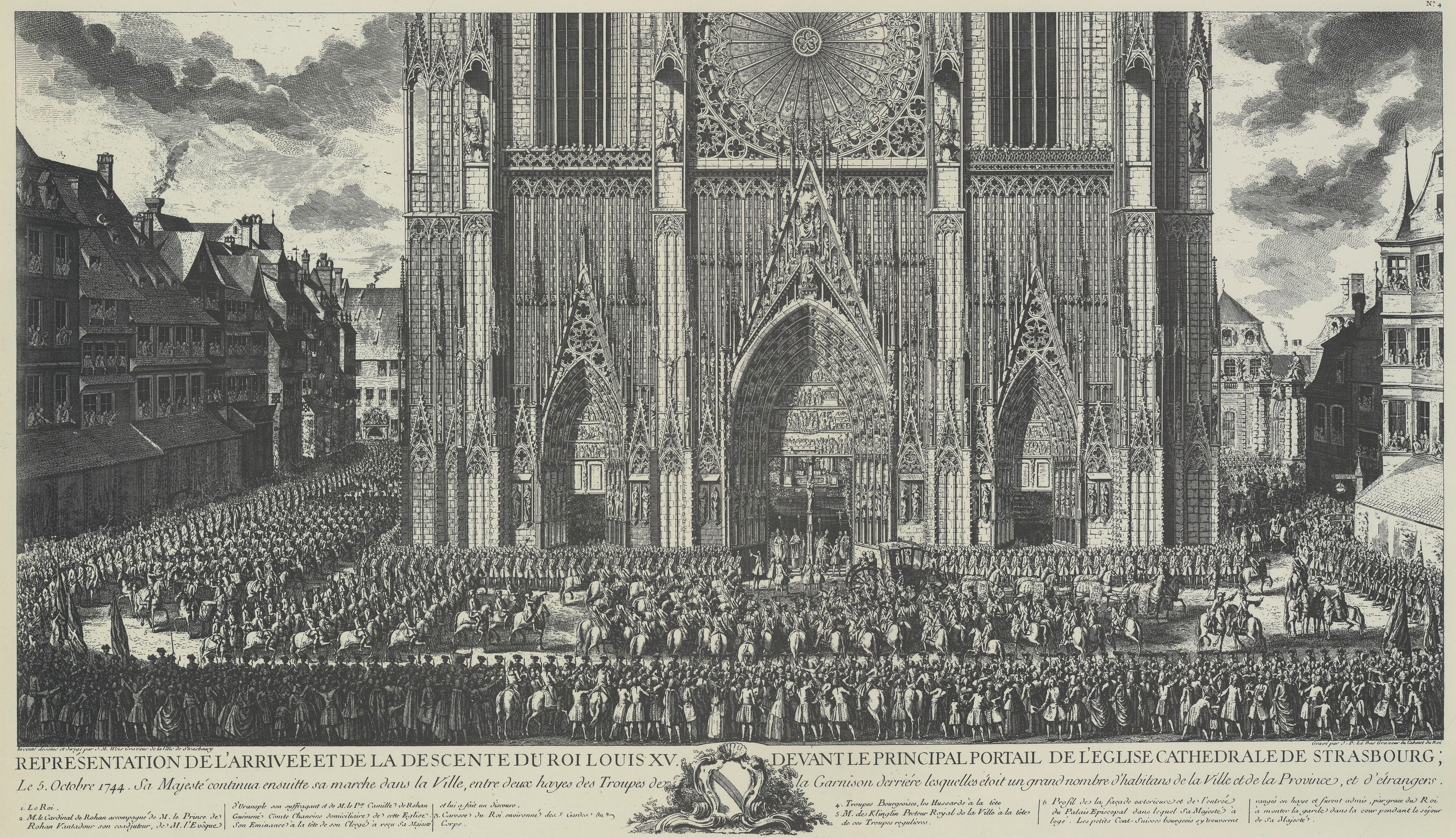
The Arrival of Louis XV at Strasbourg Cathedral, from a drawing by Weis

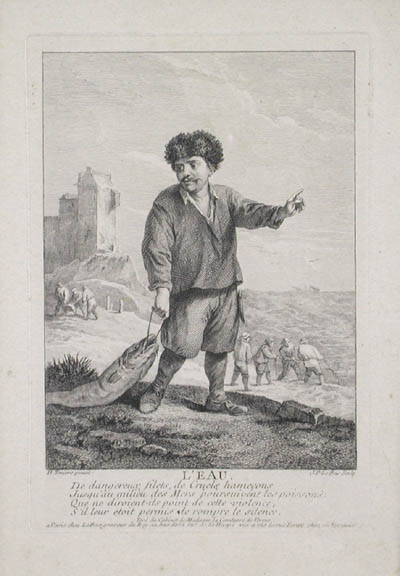
Water (from "The Four Elements"), after Teniers

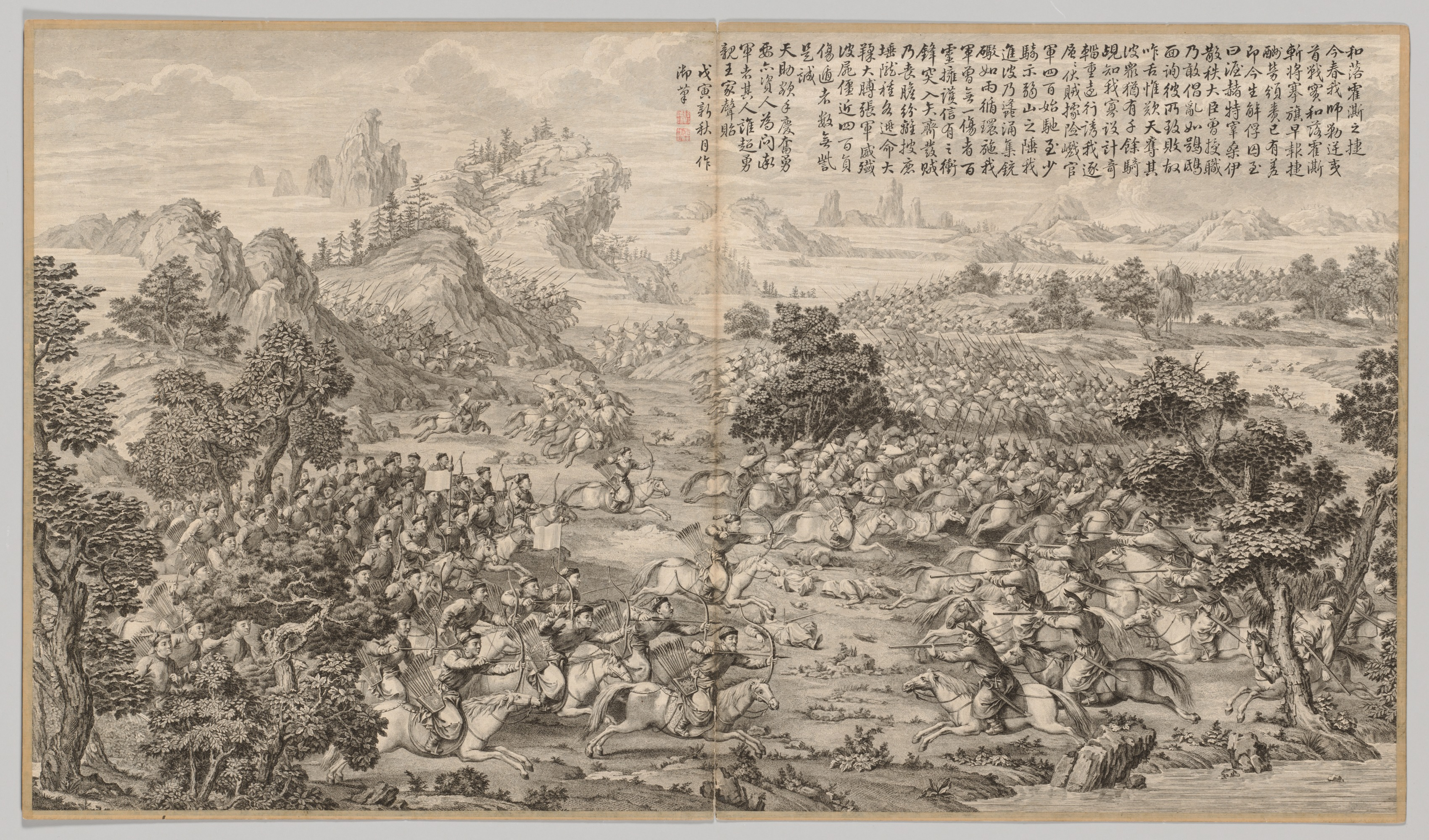
The Victory of Khorgos, one of the Ten Great Campaigns, from a drawing by Attiret

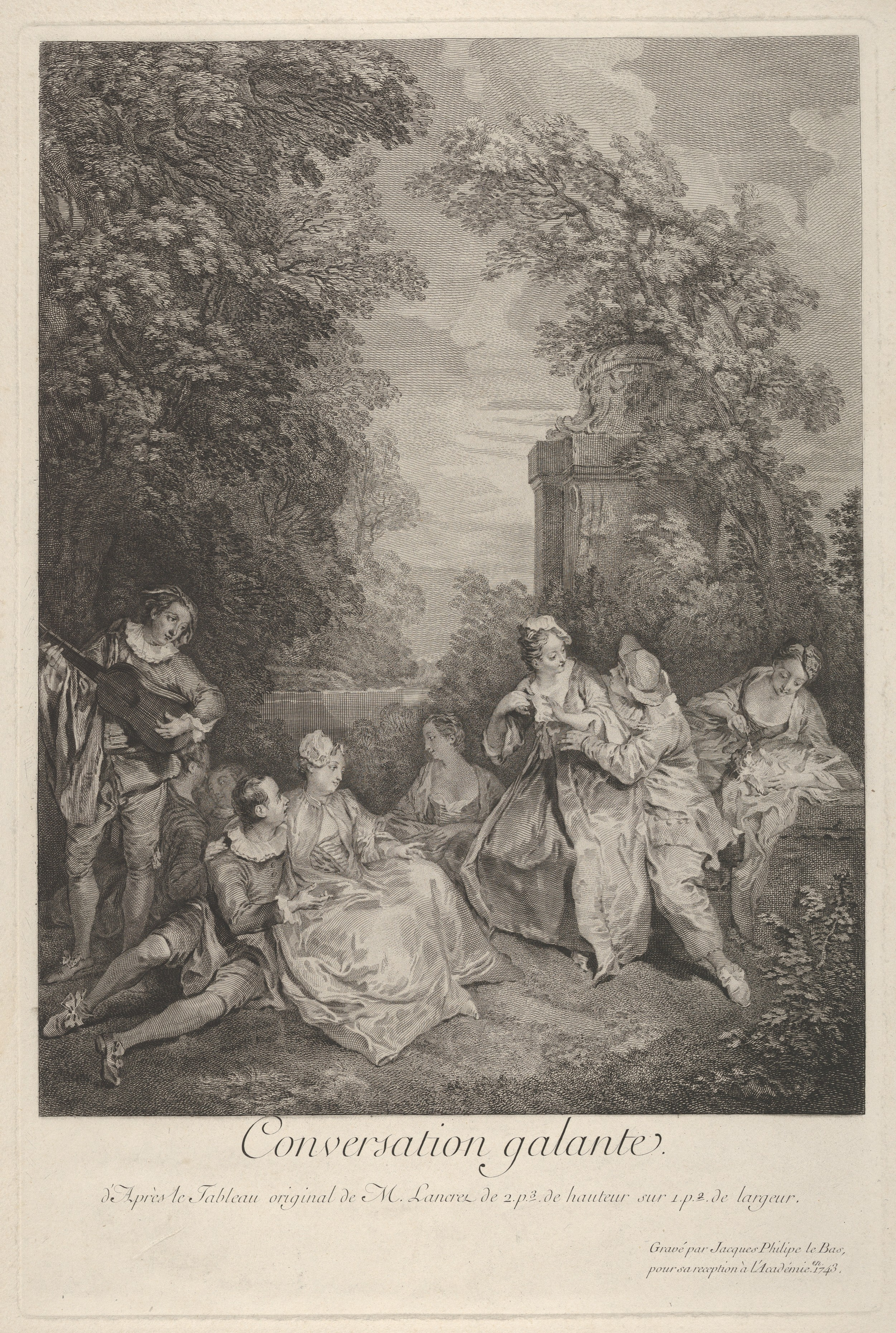
Conversation Galante,
after Lancret
