= Michel Vovelle =

French historian (1933–2018)

Michel Vovelle (French pronunciation: [miʃɛl vɔvɛl]; 6 February 1933 – 6 October 2018) was a French historian who specialised in the French Revolution.

Vovelle was born in Gallardon, near Chartres and he was educated at the Lycée Louis-le-Grand, the Lycée Henri IV, the École Normale Supérieure of St Cloud and at the University of Paris. He passed his agrégation d'histoire in 1956 and in 1963 published his first work, an edition of Marat's writings.

Vovelle's 1971 doctoral dissertation analysed the decline in religious observance in Provence from 1680 to 1790. He wrote a volume for the "Nouvelle histoire de la France contemporaine" series titled La Chute de la monarchie, 1787–1792 (1972) and in 1976 produced Religion et Révolution: La Déchristianisation de l'an II. He spent a large part of his academic career at the University of Provence before being appointed in 1983 to the Chair of the History of the French Revolution at the University of Paris.

In 1983, Michel Vovelle became president of the scientific and technical council of the Musée de la Révolution française. He was closely associated with the Communist Party.
