= Charles-Étienne Gaucher =

French engraver

Charles-Étienne Gaucher

Charles-Étienne Gaucher (1740 – 1804) was a French engraver, born and died in Paris, was first a pupil of Basan, and afterwards of J. P. Le Bas.

== Portraits ==
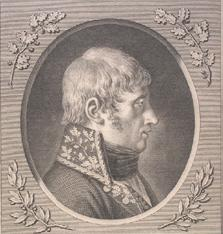
Engraved portrait of Jean-Charles Monnier, after a painting by Jean-Jacques-François Le Barbier

He engraved several portraits and other subjects, of which the following are the principal:He engraved several portraits and other subjects, of which the following are the principal:

- Maria Cecilia, Ottoman Princess, daughter of Achmet III; after his own design.
- M. du Paty, celebrated Advocate; after Notte.
- Louis Gillet.
- Louis Augustus, Dauphin of France; after Gautier.
- J. P. Timoléon de Cossé, Duke of Brissac; after St. Aubin.
- Louis de Grimaldi, Bishop of Le Mans. 1767.

== Various subjects ==
- An allegorical subject, to the memory of J. P. Le Bas; after Cochin.
- The Crowning of Voltaire; after Moreau.
- The Card-players; after Tilborch.
- Repose; after Gaspar Netscher.
