= Marie-Thérèse de Noireterre =

French artist (1760–1823)

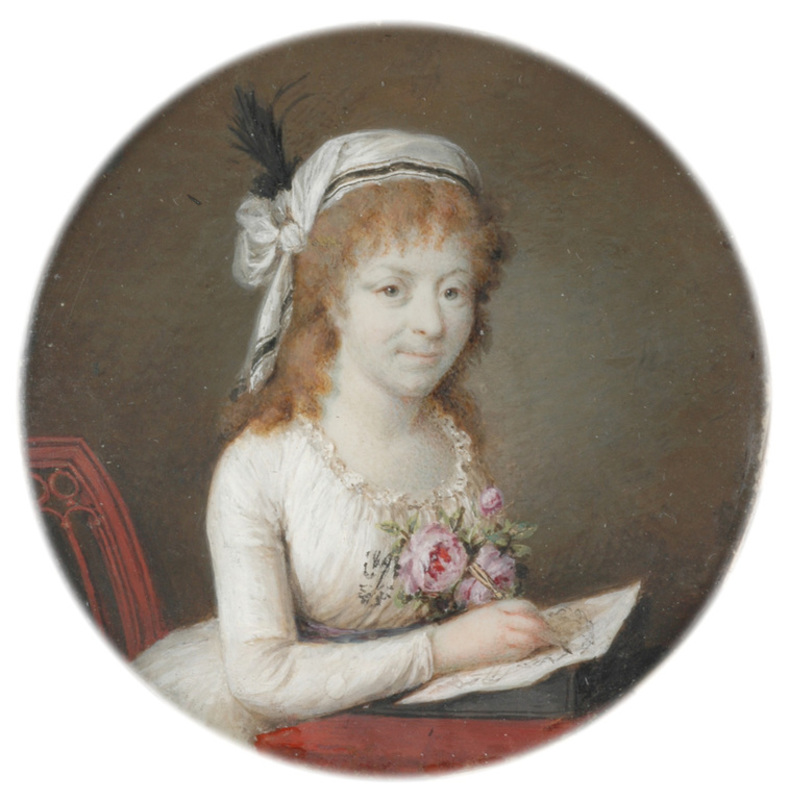
- Miniature self-portrait of Marie-Thérèse de Noireterre (c. 1786)

Marie Thérèse de Noireterre (1760–1823) was a French miniaturist.

== Biography ==
She was born in 1760 in Paris as daughter of Etienne Charles de Noiretterre and sister of Valentin de Noiretterre, niece of Claude Bornet’s wife and perhaps cousin of Guillaume Voiriot’s brother-in-law. She was one of Adélaïde Labille-Guiard’s female pupils as Marie-Gabrielle Capet (1761–1818), and she showed miniatures in the Salon de la Correspondance in 1786 and 1787 and in the Salon (Paris) from 1791 to 1803. Her autoportrait at the 1787 exhibition was previously shown in London, as her reception piece at the Society of Artists in 1785 where she appeared, as “Mlle de Noireterre, Paris”. Encouraged by the Society’s corresponding member in Paris, Charles-Étienne Gaucher (1740–1804) whom she portrayed in miniature, as well as his wife, she applied for membership in November 1786 in a letter and was elected unanimously. She lived in Paris first at 25, rue Mazarine and then 290, rue St Honorè. An inventory in the Archives nationales suggests the date of her death was May 2, 1823. Famous sitters of her miniatures include: Charles-Maurice de Talleyrand-Périgord (1754–1838), Louis Henri Loison (1771–1816), François Guillaume Ducray-Duminil (1761–1819), Marie Salmon and many others.

== Works ==
- Portrait of a lady, watercolor on ivory, Accorsi - Ometto Museum Turin
- Portrait de François Guillaume Ducray-Duminil, watercolor on ivory, 1787, Louvre
- Portrait of gentleman in Dark Green Coat, c. 1793 watercolour and gouache on ivory, unsigned, The Tansey collection
- Portrait of gentleman (the artist's father), watercolor on ivory
- Portrait of a young gentleman, in red and green checked waistcoat, watercolor on ivory
- Portrait of a lady with a little dog, c. 1805, watercolor on ivory
- Portrait of Madame Molé-Reymond, (actress) portrayed also by Élisabeth Louise Vigée Le Brun, c. 1784, watercolor and gouache on ivory, unsigned
- Portrait of a lady with a white hat, c. 1790, watercolor and gouache on ivory, signed
- Portrait of a young lady with a Bolognese dog, watercolor and gouache on ivory, unsigned
- Seven prints after portraits painted by Marie Therese de Noireterre, British Museum
- Portrait of unknown gentleman, c. 1790, watercolor on ivory, signed, Nationalmuseum Sverige
- Autoportrait, watercolor on ivory, 1795, signed, Nationalmuseum Sverige
- Portrait Mme Cordebar, watercolor on ivory, signed
- Portrait of Antoine Lavoisier (presumed), watercolor on ivory, signed
