= Jules Guiffrey =

French art historian (1840–1918)

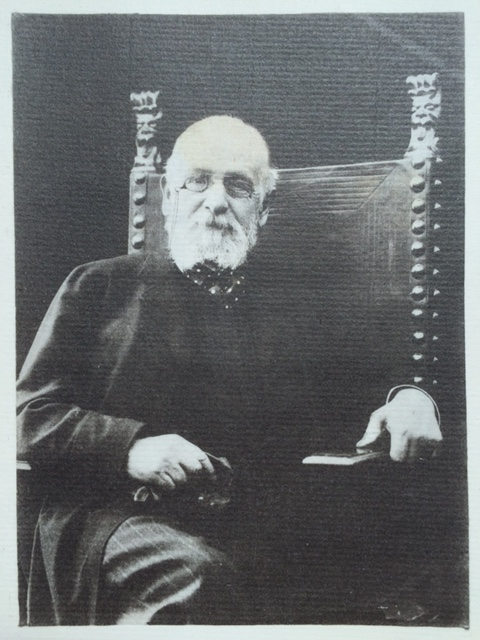
- Born: Jules-Joseph Guiffrey; 29 November 1840; Paris
- Died: 26 November 1918 (aged 77); Paris
- Occupations: Art historian Archivist; Paleographer

Jules-Joseph Guiffrey (29 November 1840 – 26 November 1918) was a 19th-century French art historian, a member of the Académie des beaux-arts.

== Career ==
While studying law (he graduated in 1861), he was a student at the École nationale des chartes where he obtained his diploma of archivist paleographer in 1863 with a thesis entitled Examen du traité qui réunit le Dauphiné à la France et des négociations qui l’ont précédé et suivi (1349).

In 1866 he was appointed an archivist of the Emperor's archives then at the Archives nationales in the Legislative and Judicial department, where he did much of his career.

In 1893, he was appointed administrator of the manufacture nationale des Gobelins

Throughout his career, he conducted research in art history - sometimes at the expense of its archival activity. In 1866, he established the "Société de l'histoire de l'art français" and in 1872 took over Charles-Philippe de Chennevières-Pointel's Archives de l'art français under the title Nouvelles Archives de l'art français. He was also a member of the Société de l'histoire de Paris (1874), the Comité des travaux historiques et scientifiques (1877), and the Comité des travaux historiques de la Ville de Paris (1879).

He was made an officer of Instruction publique in 1883, chevalier (1884) then officier (1897) of the Légion d'honneur. In 1899, he was elected a member of the Académie des Beaux-Arts to seat 7 of the free members section.

== Works ==
- L’Œuvre de Charles-Émile Jacque, 1866.
- Histoire de la réunion du Dauphiné à la France, 1866.
- Les Caffieri, sculpteurs et fondeurs-ciseleurs, 1877 (Read online).
- Histoire générale de la tapisserie, 1879.
- Comptes des bâtiments du roi sous le règne de Louis XIV, Imprimerie nationale, Paris :
  - Tome 1, Colbert 1664-1680, 1879 (Read online).
  - Tome 2, Colbert et Louvois 1681-1687, 1887 (Read online).
  - Tome 3, Louvois et Colbert de Villacerf 1688-1695, 1891 (Read online).
- Antoine van Dyck. Sa vie et son œuvre, 1882 (his main work).
- Inventaire général du mobilier de la couronne sous Louis XIV (1663-1715), Paris, 1885-1886 (2 vol.) :
  - Tome 1 online on Gallica
  - Tome 2 online on Gallica
- Inventaire général des richesses d'art de la France. Paris : monuments civils, tome 1, E. Plon et Cie imprimeur-éditeurs, Paris, 1879 (read online).
- Inventaire général des richesses d'art de la France. Paris : monuments civils, tome 2, E. Plon, Nourrit et Cie imprimeurs-éditeurs, Paris, 1889 (read online).
- Inventaire général des richesses d'art de la France. Paris : monuments religieux, tome 1, E. Plon et Cie imprimeurs-éditeurs, Paris, 1876 (Read online).
- Inventaire général des richesses d'art de la France. Paris : monuments religieux, tome 2, E. Plon, Nourrit et Cie imprimeur-éditeurs, Paris, 1888 (Read online).
- Histoire de la tapisserie depuis le moyen âge jusqu'à nos jours, 1885, Alfred Mame et fils, Tours, 1886 (Read online).
- Œuvres choisies de Clément Marot, 1876.
- Catalogue sommaire du musée des Archives nationales, précédé d'une notice historique sur le palais des Archives, librairie Ch. Delagrave, Paris, 1893 (Read online).
- Un chapitre inédit de l'histoire des tombes royales de Saint-Denis d'après les documents conservés aux Archives nationales, Henri Menu libraire-éditeur, 1876 (Read online).
- Artistes parisiens du XVIe et du XVIIe siècles : donations, contrats de mariage, testaments, inventaires, etc. tirés des insinuations du Châtelet de Paris, Imprimerie nationale, Paris, 1915 (Rread online).
- Scellés et inventaires d'artistes français du XVIIème et du XVIIIème siècle, First part, [1643-1740] : Documents inédits tirés des archives nationales, Charavay frères libraires, Paris, 1884 (Read online).
- Scellés et inventaires d'artistes français du XVIIème et du XVIIIème siècle, Second part, 1741-1770 : Documents inédits tirés des archives nationales, Charavay frères libraires, Paris, 1885 (Read online).
- Scellés et inventaires d'artistes français du XVIIème et du XVIIIème siècle, Third and last part, [1771-1790] : Documents inédits tirés des archives nationales, Charavay frères libraires, Paris, 1886 (Read online).
- Exposition des Primitifs français au Palais du Louvre (Pavillon de Marsan) et à la Bibliothèque nationale : catalogue (Read online).
- Avec Anatole de Montaiglon, Correspondance des directeurs de l'Académie de France à Rome avec les Surintendants des Bâtiments, publiée d'après les manuscrits des Archives nationales, 18 volumes (Rad online: general Index).

== Honours ==
- Officier of the Ordre des Palmes académiques, (1883).
- Chevalier of the Légion d'honneur, (19 April 1884).
- Officier of the Légion d'honneur, (27 July 1897).
