= André-Charles Cailleau =

French book publisher

- Born: 17 June 1731; Touraine, France
- Died: 12 June 1798 (aged 66); Paris, France
- Occupation: Book publisher

André-Charles Cailleau (1731–1798) was a French book publisher, bookseller and man of letters.

== Life ==
He was born on 17 June 1731 in Touraine, France.

He was a contemporary of Jacques Charles Brunet.

He died on 12 June 1798 in Paris, France.

== Career ==
Along with Laurent-François Prault, he was one of the most well known and established book publishers and printers of France.

== Works ==
His most well known works are:

- Lettres et épîtres amoureuses d'Héloïse et d'Abeilard, tant en vers qu'en prose (Love letters and epistles of Héloïse and Abélard, as much in verse as in prose), 1798
- The Evenings of the Countryside, 1766
- Dictionnaire bibliographique, historique et critique des livres rares (A Dictionary of Bibliographical, Historical and Rare Books) with R. Duclos, 3 volumes, 1790
