= Entente Florale Europe =

International horticultural competition

Logo of Entente Florale

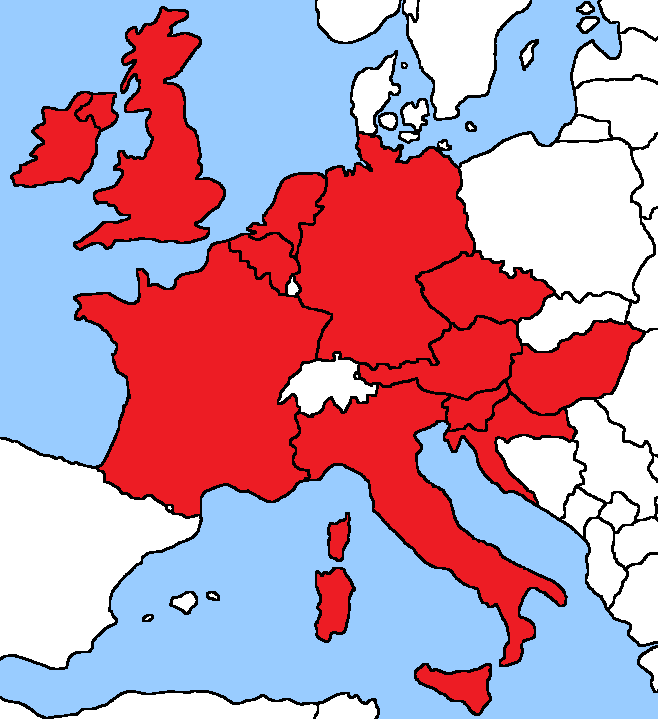
Map of countries which take part in the Entente Florale

The Entente Florale Europe ([ɑ̃.tɑ̃t flɔʁal ø.ʁɔp], "Flowery Alliance of Europe") is an international horticultural competition established to recognise municipalities and villages in Europe for excellence in horticultural displays. Trophies are presented annually by tourist boards and horticultural societies of European countries. There are three categories:

- "Cities" (population over 30,000)
- "Town" (population of 5,000–30,000)
- "Village" (population of less than 5,000).

== History ==
Entente Florale Europe is a competition for Towns and Villages. The competition name puns on the Entente Cordiale ("Friendly Understanding", 1904). Each participating country puts forward a representative Town and Village. The Town and Village are visited by the Jury and an assessment is made. The competition was founded in 1975, initially between Great Britain and France. At present there are eleven member countries and further applications are being processed.

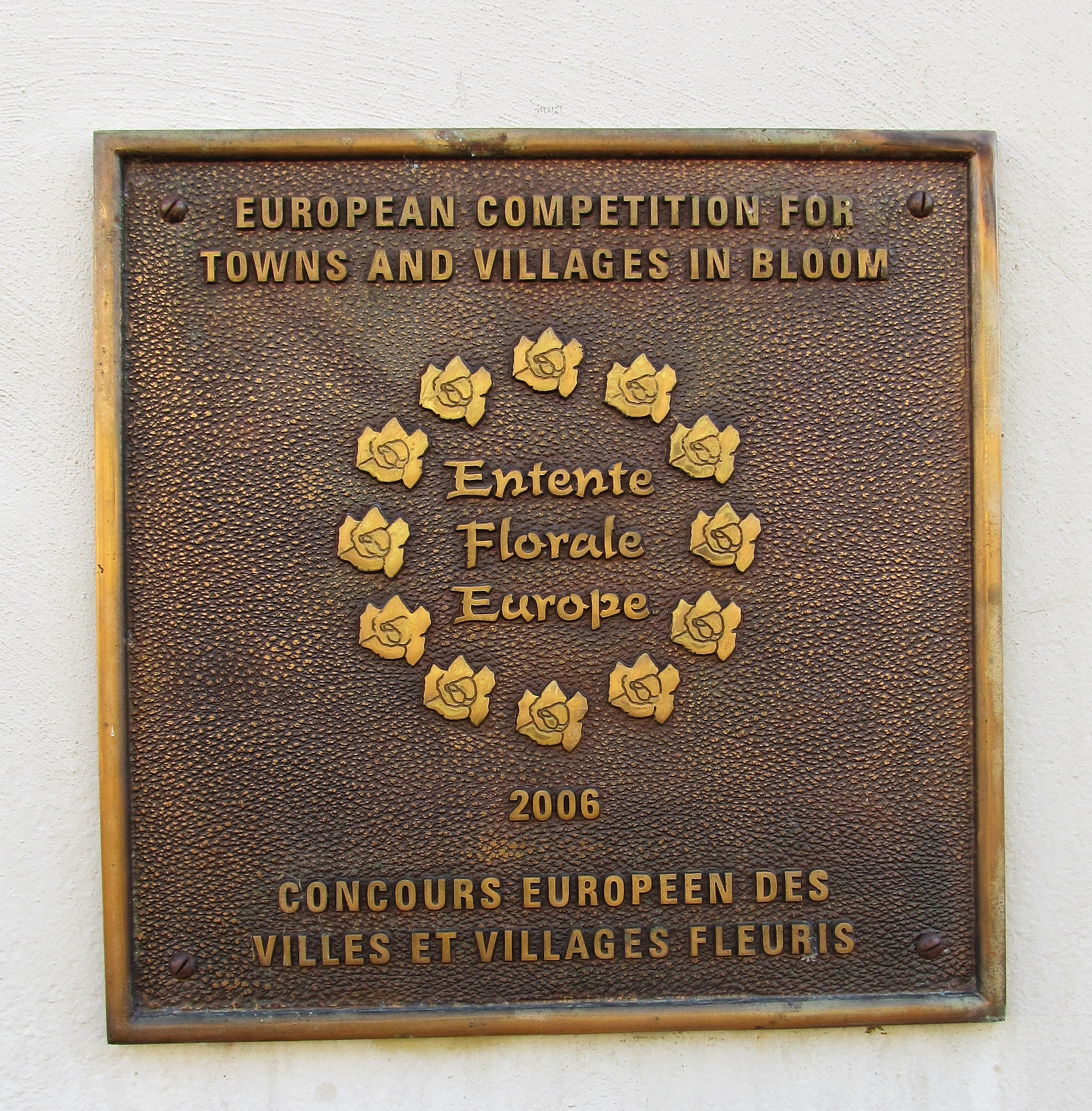
Commemorative plaque in Eguisheim, 2006 gold medal in the villages category

In 1996, an international non profit association (AISBL) was founded under the name of Association Européenne pour le Fleurissement et le Paysage (European Association for Blooming and the Countryside), with the responsibility of the overall organisation of the competition and to obtain support from official bodies in the different countries. The AEFP is incorporated under the Belgian Law of 8 September 1997, and the Statutes were published in the Belgian Monitor on 8 September 1998. The amended articles, by Law of 2 May 2002 were published in the Belgian Monitor on 28 April 2006.

Since 1998 under the aegis of the 'Association Européenne pour le Fleurissement et le Paysage', the association and the competition Entente Florale Europe are open to all countries in the European Union as well as to the EFTA members countries (European Free Trade Association).

The competition has enjoyed the support of the International Association of Horticulture producers (AIPH) since its inception. In individual countries the competition is supported and organised by Ministries/Department of Agriculture, Tourism, as well as horticultural bodies and associations.

The President represents the association and is acting for 2 years. Each successive President shall be from a different country per alphabetic order.

== Participation ==
The competition is open to all countries in the EU and in the EFTA subject to approval by the board of AEFP. There are three categories; every member country can put forward two entries from two different categories.

- Cities/Towns (population over 30,000)
- Towns (population between 5,000 and 30,000)
- Villages (population below 5,000)

Applications are made by the national organisation in charge of the competition. New members are elected by the Board of Directors of the AEFP, by simple majority, at its twice yearly meetings (March and September). Notification of entrants from existing members should reach the Secretariat before December 31 of the year prior to adjudication.

== Organisation ==
Overall organisation is by the "Association Européenne du Fleurissement et du Paysage" (A.E.F.P.). AEFP is a non-profit organization, incorporated under Belgian Law(s). Each participant country has its own organisation and is entitled to membership on the Board of Directors of the AEFP. The competition has enjoyed the support of the International Association of Horticultural Producers (AIPH) since its inception. In individual countries the competition is supported and organised by Ministries/Departments of Agriculture, Environment, Tourism as well as horticultural bodies and associations.

The Aim of the Competition

The overall aim of the competition is the improvement of the quality of life for local urban and village communities. To this end the competition fosters:

- The greening of towns and villages
- Flowers, shrubs, green spaces, parks
- Development which is environmentally and ecologically sensitive
- Educational and communication initiatives which promote environmental awareness.

== Jury members in 2015 ==
Austria (AT)

- Martin Wagner, Horticultural engineer; Vice-chair of the jury
- Johanna Renat, Spatial planner

Belgium (BE)

- Rudi Geerardyn, Landscape architect & Town planner; Chair of the jury

Czech Republic (CZ)

- Inka Truxova, Landscape architect
- Petr Šiřina, Landscape architect
- Jaroslav Brzak, Landscape architect

Germany (DE)

- Dr. Rüdiger Kirsten, Landscape architect & Town planner; Vice-chair of the jury
- Hildegunde Franziska Henrich, Landscape architect & Town planner

Hungary (HU)

- Dr. Andrea Bocsi, Tourism expert & Economist
- Dr. Ildikó Réka Báthoryné Nagy, Landscape architect
- Szilvia Halász Spanyárné, Landscape architect

Ireland (IE)

- Eamonn De Stafort, Tourism consultant
- Dr. Christy Boylan, Horticulturist & Landscape architect

Italy (IT)

- Anna Furlani Pedoja, Landscape architect
- Jacopo Fontaneto, Agriculture and Green Journalist, Tourism consultant
- Mauro Paradisi, Municipal urban designer

Netherlands (NL)

- Nico Anthony Brink Landscape architect
- Marjolijn Ruijs, Landscape contractor

Slovenia (SI)

- Anton Schlaus, Architect & Consultant for energy efficient building
- Martina Schlaus, Architect & Conservator for Cultural Heritage

United Kingdom (UK)

- Peter Holman, Horticultural & Greenspace Consultant
- David Littlewood, Horticulturist
- Mark Wasilewski, Park Management

== Previous winners ==
Note re UK representatives -

=== Towns/Cities ===
Year	Austria	Belgium	Croatia	Czech Republic	France	Germany	Hungary	Ireland (Republic of Ireland)	Italy	Netherlands	Slovenia	United Kingdom
2022	-	Dixmude; Gold	-	-	-	-	Orfű; Silver	-	-	-	-	-
2021
2020
2019
2018
2017	Schwaz; Gold	Hamont-Achel; Silver	-	Brno; Gold	-	Duchroth; Gold	Kaposvár; Silver	Glaslough; Gold; Abbeyleix; Silver; Biodiversity award	-	Beek en Donk; Gold	Piran; Silver; Žalec; Gold	-
2016	Bad Ischl; Gold	Turnhout; Silver	-	Slavkov u Brna; Silver	-	Wangerland; Silver	Mosonmagyaróvár; Silver	Tullamore; Gold	-	Dalfsen; Gold	-	-
2015	Mödling; Gold	Genk; Silver	-	-	-	Rheinfelden; Gold	Siófok; Silver	Trim; Gold	Merano; Gold	Bergen op Zoom; Gold	Slovenj Gradec; Gold	Henley; Silver
2014	-	Eeklo; Silver	Đakovo; Bronze	-	-	Kitzingen; Gold	Gyula; Gold	Tralee; Gold	Neviglie; Silver	Amstelveen; Gold	Slovenske Konjice; Gold	Edinburgh; Gold
2013	Kufstein; Silver	Sint Niklaas; Silver	Zagreb; Silver	-	-	Dresden; Gold	Hévíz; Silver	Ballincollig; Silver	Spello; Silver	Weert; Gold	Bled; Silver	Birmingham; Gold
2012	Fürstenfeld; Silver	La Louvière; Hoogstraten; Gold	Osijek; Bronze	Uherské Hradiště; Silver	-	-	Százhalombatta; Silver	Clonmel; Silver	Savigliano; Silver	Ermelo; Silver	Ptuj; Bronze	Bristol; Rustington; Gold
2011	Neusiedl am See; Silver	Veurne; Gold	Varaždin; Silver	Broumov; Silver	-	Bad Langensalza; Gold	Balatonfüred; Gold	Drogheda; Silver	Grado; Gold	Deventer; Gold	-	Tameside; Silver
2010	Kirchschlag in der Buckligen Welt; Silver	Hasselt; Silver	Požega commemoration certificate	Havířov; Silver	Beauvais; Silver	Westerstede; Gold	Sopron; Silver	Carrick on Shannon; Gold	Avigliana; Silver	Vlaardingen; Gold	Mozirje; Silver + Lucia Cikes award	Stockton on Tees; Gold
2009	Deutschlandsberg; Silver + special award	Nieuwpoort; Silver	Mali Lošinj; Silver	Krnov; Silver	-	Weimar; Silver + special award	Szombathely; Silver	Dundalk; Silver	Avigliana; Silver	Arnhem; Gold	Kamnik; Silver	Buxton; Silver
2008	Tulln; Gold	Arlon; Silver	Split; Silver	Kyjov; Silver	Tours; Gold	Düsseldorf; Gold	Gyula; Silver	Letterkenny; Gold	Cervia; Gold	Uden; Gold	Rogaška Slatina; Silver	Plymouth; Silver
2007	-	Mechelen; Gold	Biograd; Silver	Tábor; Silver	Nancy; Gold	Münster; Gold	Eger; Gold	Killarney; Gold	Omegna; Bronze	Amersfoort; Gold	Novo Mesto; Bronze + special award	Shrewsbury; Gold
2006	Linz; Gold	Kortrijk; Gold	Opatija; Silver	Plzeň; Silver	Beaune; Gold	Kiel; Gold	Nagyatád; Gold	Kilkenny; Silver	Alba; Bronze	Zwolle; Gold	Šenčur; Bronze	Cardiff; Gold
2005	Baden; Gold	Middelkerke; Silver	Rab; Silver	Litomyšl; Silver	Le Plessis-Robinson; Gold	Potsdam; Gold	Makó; Silver	Lismore; Gold		's-Hertogenbosch; Silver	Radenci; Bronze	Sheffield; Gold
2004	Donaustadt; Gold	Lochristi; Silver	Velika Gorica; Silver	Brno; Silver	Cahors; Gold	Bad Kissingen; Gold	Kaposvár; Gold	Westport; Gold		Enschede; Silver	Žalec; Silver	Bridgnorth; Silver
2003	Kindberg; Gold	-	Kaštela; Bronze	Prachatice; Silver	Hyères; Gold	Bad Säckingen; Gold	Zalakaros; Silver	Malahide; Gold		Venlo; Gold	Slovenj Gradec; Silver	Harrogate; Gold + Lucia Cikes award
2002	Pinkafeld; Gold	Tielt; Silver		Frýdek-Místek; Bronze	Évian-les-Bains; Gold	Celle; Silver	Paks; Silver	Ennis; Gold		Alphen aan den Rijn; Gold	Ptuj; Silver	Bath; Silver
2001	Tulln; Gold	Gent; Silver			Limoges; Gold	Luckau; Silver	Győr; Silver	Killarney; Silver		Sittard; Silver	Kamnik; Gold	Sunderland; Gold
2000	Frohnleiten; Gold	Schoten; Silver			Grande-Synthe; Silver	Heilbronn; Gold	Sárospatak; Silver	Letterkenny; Bronze		Leusden; Silver	Nova Gorica; Bronze	Solihull; Gold
1999	Sankt Veit an der Glan; Silver	Oudenaarde; Silver			Cesson-Sévigné; Gold	Fulda; Gold	Tata; Silver	Westport; Silver		Doetinchem; Silver	Velenje; Gold	Wetherby; Gold
1998	Kitzbühel; Silver	Blankenberge; Bronze			Montbéliard; Gold	Rheda-Wiedenbrück; Silver	Héviz; Silver	Kilkenny; Silver		Voorburg; Silver	Slovenske Konjice; Gold	Nottingham; Gold
1997	Kindberg; Silver	Diest; Bronze			Rueil-Malmaison; Gold	Augsburg; Gold	Siófok; Gold	Ennis; Silver		Veenendaal; Gold		Oxford; Silver
1996	Bregenz; Silver	Malmedy; Gold			Cabourg; Silver	Duderstadt; Silver	Székesfehérvár; Silver	Skerries; Gold		Breda; Bronze		Barnstaple; Gold
1995	Köflach	Bruges			Mâcon	Grevenbroich	Sarvár	Clonakilty		Heiloo		Bournemouth
1994	Tulln	Roeselare			Metz	Burchau	Balatonföldvar	Letterkenny		-		Perth
1993	Hall	Enghien			Le Touquet-Paris-Plage		Veszprém	Kenmare		Driebergen		Port Sunlight
1992	Sankt Jakob im Walde	Eupen			Aix-les-Bains		Eger	Westport		Thorn		St Ives, Cornwall
1991	Steinfurt	Malmedy			Beaune		Kecskemét	Limerick		-		Saintfield
1990	Frohnleiten	Saint Kathrein Spa			Les Avirons		Budapest	Malahide		Voorst		Telford
1989	Baden	Hasselt			Angers			Carlow		Asten		Bury St. Edmunds
1988	Bregenz	Genk			Épinal			Killarney		Dordrecht		Stratford upon Avon
1987	Pottenbrunn	Ossongne			Créteil			Kill				Shrewsbury
1986	Klagenfurt	Bruges			Cabourg			Kinsale				Torquay
1985	-	Westrozebeke			Mareil-sur-Loir			Ardee				Sampford Courtenay
1984	Mönichwald	-			Ferrières-les-Bois			Galway				Kelso
1983	Leoben	Hasselt			Vélizy-Villacoublay			Birr				Eastbourne
1982	Wenigzell	Profondeville			Viriat			Kilkenny				Dary
1981	Millstatt	Kortrijk			Courrières			Malahide				Exeter
1980	Wien	Durbuy			Nantes							York
1979	Reith im Alpbachtal	Bruges			Vichy							St Andrews
1978		Antwerp; Duffel			Orléans; Thonon-les-Bains							Bath; Aberdyfi
1977		Brussels; Leuven			Cannes; Yvoire							Harrogate; Falmouth
1976		Kortrijk; Ghent			Nice; Évian-les-Bains							Douglas
1975					Châtillon-sur-Chalaronne							Aberdeen; Nantwich

=== Villages ===
Year	Austria	Belgium	Croatia	Czech Republic	France	Germany	Hungary	Ireland (Republic of Ireland)	Italy	Netherlands	Slovenia	United Kingdom
2022	Bad Sauerbrunn; Gold		-	Dobrochov; Gold	-	Bollstedt; Silver	Veresegyház; Silver; Székesfehérvár; Gold	Keadue; Gold	-	-	-	-
2021
2020
2019
2018
2017	St Anton am Arlberg; Gold	-	-	Kostelní Lhota; Silver	-	-	Tihany; Gold	Glaslough; Gold; Abbeyleix; Silver	Pomaretto; Silver; Faedo; Silver	-	-	-
2016	-	-	-	Hrušky; Silver	-	-	Dunakiliti; Silver	Straffan; Silver	-	Ootmarsum; Silver	Šmarješke Toplice; Silver	-
2015	-	-	-	Modrá; Silver	-	Wieden; Silver	Balatongyörök; Gold	Kilrush; Gold	La Magdeleine; Bronze	Beesel; Silver	Radlje ob Dravi; Silver	-
2014	Haus; Gold	-	Nin; Silver	Cehnice; Gold	-	Sommerach; Gold	Zebegény; Silver	Dromod; Silver	Usseaux; Silver	Zuidlaren; Gold	Velika Polana; Gold	Bournemouth; Gold
2013	Söll; Silver	-	-	Dolní Břežany; Silver	-	Kirchbach; Silver	Csopak; Silver	Clonegal; Gold	Etroubles; Gold	Bergeijk; Gold	Podčetrtek; Gold	-
2012	Gamlitz; Gold	-	-	Drmoul	-	Dötlingen	Lövő	Abbeyshrule	Sordevolo	Dwingeloo	Cerklje	-
2011	Rennweg am Katschberg; Gold	-	-	Smrzice; Silver	-	Wiesenburg; Silver	Paloznak; Silver	Clonegal; Gold	Transacqua; Silver	Elburg; Silver	-	-
2010	Reichenau an der Rax; Silver	Ittre; Silver	Sveti Martin na Muri; Silver	Studenec; Silver	Guyencourt-Saulcourt; Gold	Banzkow; Silver	Lipót; Gold	Emly; Silver	Stresa; Silver	Helenaveen (Deurne); Silver	Šentjernej; Silver	St. Brelade; Gold
2009	Mooskirchen; Gold	Gouvy; Silver	Molve; Silver	Mořice; Silver + special award	-	Rieth; Silver	Gelse; Silver + special award	Clonakilty; Gold	Pré-Saint-Didier; Gold	Sluis; Silver	Olimje; Gold	Forres; Gold
2008	Hanfthal; Silver	Zwevegem; Gold	Novi Vinodolski; Silver	Tvarožná Lhota; Silver	Aubigny-sur-Nère Silver	Rehinghausen; Silver	Tápiógyörgye; Silver	Tallanstown; Gold	Bergolo; Silver	Beek/Ubbergen; Bronze	Medana; Bronze	Garstang; Gold
2007	Donnersbach; Gold	Flohimont; Bronze	Primošten; Gold	Zálší; Bronze	Gelaucourt; Silver	Gersbach; Gold	Noszvaj; Bronze	Birdhill; Gold	Limone Piemonte; Gold	Haren; Bronze + Lucia Cikes award	Smlednik; Silver + special award	Falkland, Fife; Gold
2006	Virgen; Gold	Sohier; Silver	Skradinski Buk; Bronze	Svojsin; Bronze	Eguisheim; Gold	Brokeloh; Gold	Orfű; Bronze	Aughrim; Gold	Cella Monte; Silver	Wijhe; Silver	Križeča vas Silver	Usk; Silver
2005	Hornsburg; Gold	Villers-la-Ville; Bronze	Brela; Bronze	Písečná; Gold	Oger; Gold	Bertsdorf-Hörnitz; Gold	Ruzsa; Bronze	Glenties; Silver	-	Oosterbeek; Gold	Radenci; Bronze	St. Ives; Carbis Bay; Gold
2004					Cayriech; Gold	Nußdorf am Inn; Gold					Šentjernej; Silver	Darley; Gold
2003					Bormes-les-Mimosas; Gold	Neuenweg; Silver					Zreče; Silver	
2002	Antau	Omal/Geer		Telecí	Yvoire; Silver	Päse; Gold	Gyederlak	Stradbally		Ommen	Kostanjevica na Krki; Silver	Thorpe Salvin
2001					Saint-Hilaire-les-Places; Gold	Obercunnersdorf; Gold		Leighlinbridge; Gold		Dreischor; Gold	Spodnja Idrija; Silver	
2000					Saint-Aubin; Silver	Immenstaad-Kippenhausen; Silver		Clonakilty; Gold		Sint-Oedenrode; Gold	Podčetrtek; Silver	
1999					Juvigné; Gold	Schweickershausen; Silver		Clonakilty; Gold				
1998					Rougegoutte; Silver	Bruchhausen; Gold					Žiče; Bronze	
1997					Forest-l'Abbaye; Bronze	Horsdorf; Gold	Pusztamérges Bronze					
1996					La Vraie-Croix; Gold	Rambach; Silver		Skerries; Gold				
1995						Veldenz; Certificate of Excellence						
1994						Bürchau; Certificate of Excellence						Broughshane
1991												Saintfield
1990												Forres
1989												Market Bosworth
1988												St Florence
1987												Sorn
1986												Moira
1985												Sampford Courtenay
1984												Lympstone
1983												Lund
1982												Pateley Bridge
1981												Killingworth
1980												Warrington
1979												Holywell
1978												Pateley Bridge^{Note 1}; Sidmouth; Aberdyfi
1977												Falmouth; Wolviston
1976												Colwyn Bay; Leven
1975												Clovelly & Edzell

==== Notes ====
Note 1 - in some cases the overall winner from the UK is not named in "Britain in Bloom" by Graham Ashworth as an Entente Florale Representative (namely Bath in 1975 and Pateley Bridge in 1978).
Note 2 - Luxembourg competed between years 1980–1988.
Note 3 - Switzerland competed between years 1984–1986.
Note 4 - Portugal competed in year 1991 and between years 1994–2000.
Note 5 - Canada competed between years 1992–1993.
