= Písečná =

Písečná may refer to places in the Czech Republic:

- Písečná (Frýdek-Místek District), a municipality and village in the Moravian-Silesian Region
- Písečná (Jeseník District), a municipality and village in the Olomouc Region
- Písečná (Ústí nad Orlicí District), a municipality and village in the Pardubice Region
- Písečná, a village and part of Česká Lípa in the Liberec Region
- Písečná, a village and part of Litvínov in the Ústí nad Labem Region
