= Hector Sohier =

Hector Sohier was a 16th-century Normand architect. He is the author of many buildings in Caen. He died around 1560.

Sohier was not only a skilled builder, an original and resourceful mind, he still possessed to the highest degree the art of ensuring the admiration of his works over the centuries by inoculating them with the secret of beauty. Every detail in Saint-Pierre shows the most delicate taste and perhaps never has wealth possessed so much seductive charm. See instead these delicately carved friezes, where common objects almost vulgar are transformed by the whims of imagination, these historized capitals, which, approaching antiquity, have nothing of the classic coldness, these niches so brilliantly decorated, that they seem made to receive we do not know which admirable statues, these hanging keys where are sometimes spread out in miniatures of true monuments.... And all this is so to speak only the ordinary baggage, the more careful implementation of the decoration system generally practiced. But where the originality of Hector Sohier shines, it is in the composition of the buttresses and the balustrades, in these marvellous pinnacles with flared bases and multiplied bulges, which rise at each corner of the terraces, and give to the apse of Saint-Pierre this seal of nobility and elegance which makes its right reputation

. - Léon Palustre (1838-1894), director of the Société française d'archéologie.

== Works ==
- Apse of the Church of Saint-Pierre, Caen (1518-1545)
- Apse of the Église Saint-Sauveur de Caen (1546)
- Château of Chanteloup

=== Works formerly attributed to Hector Sohier ===
- Hôtel d'Escoville.
- Choir and chapels of the Église du Vieux Saint-Sauveur de Caen (circa 1546).
- Château de Lasson (circa 1517).

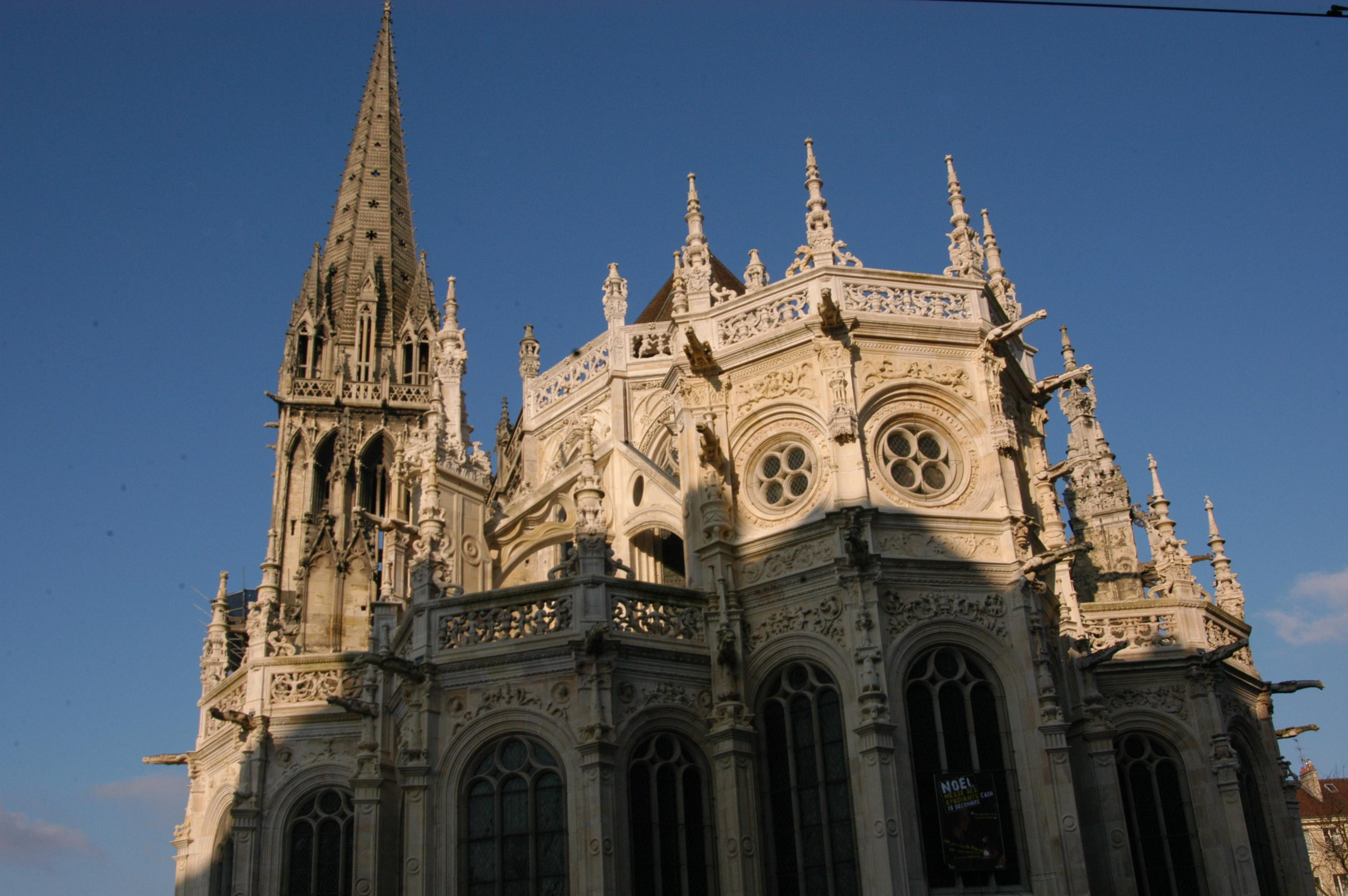
Apse of the église Saint-Pierre

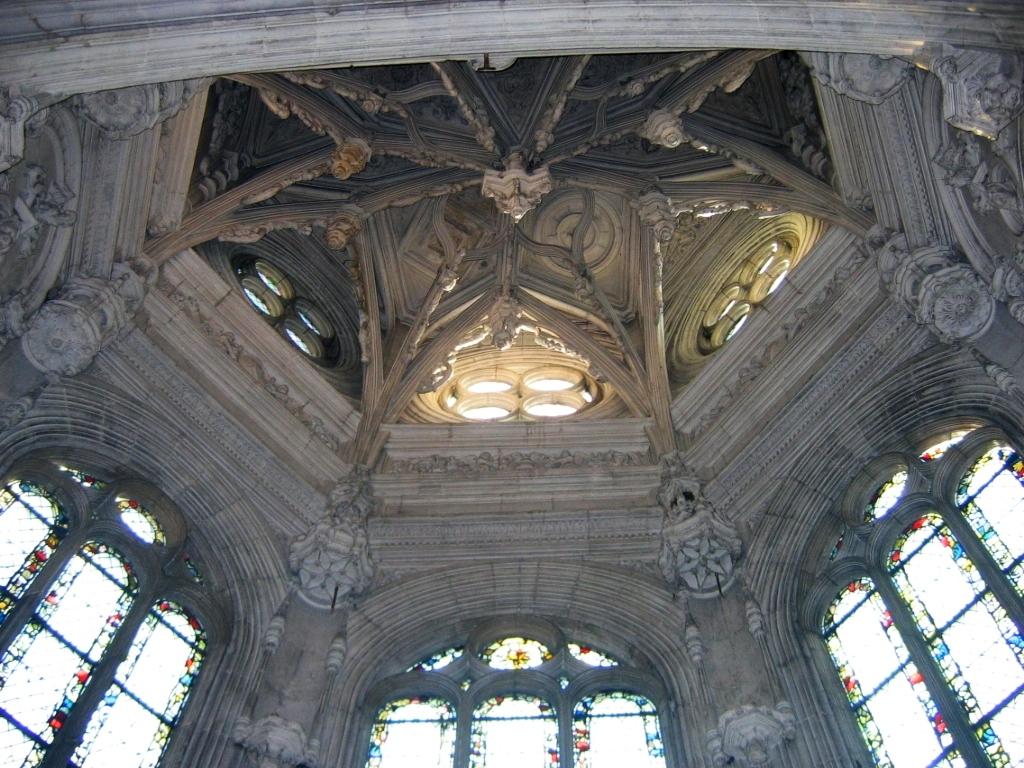
Vaults of the apse

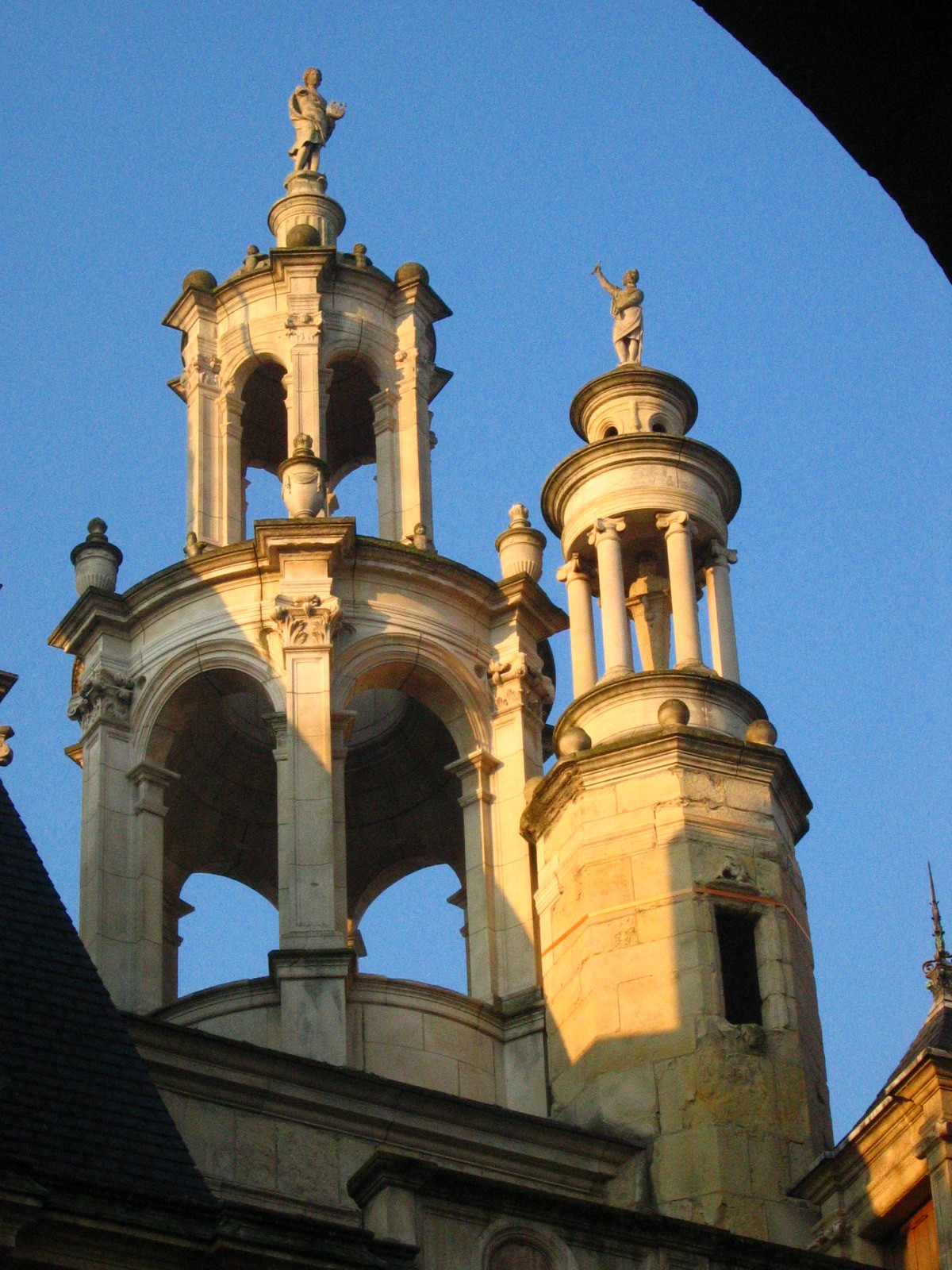
Lantern of the hotel d'Escoville

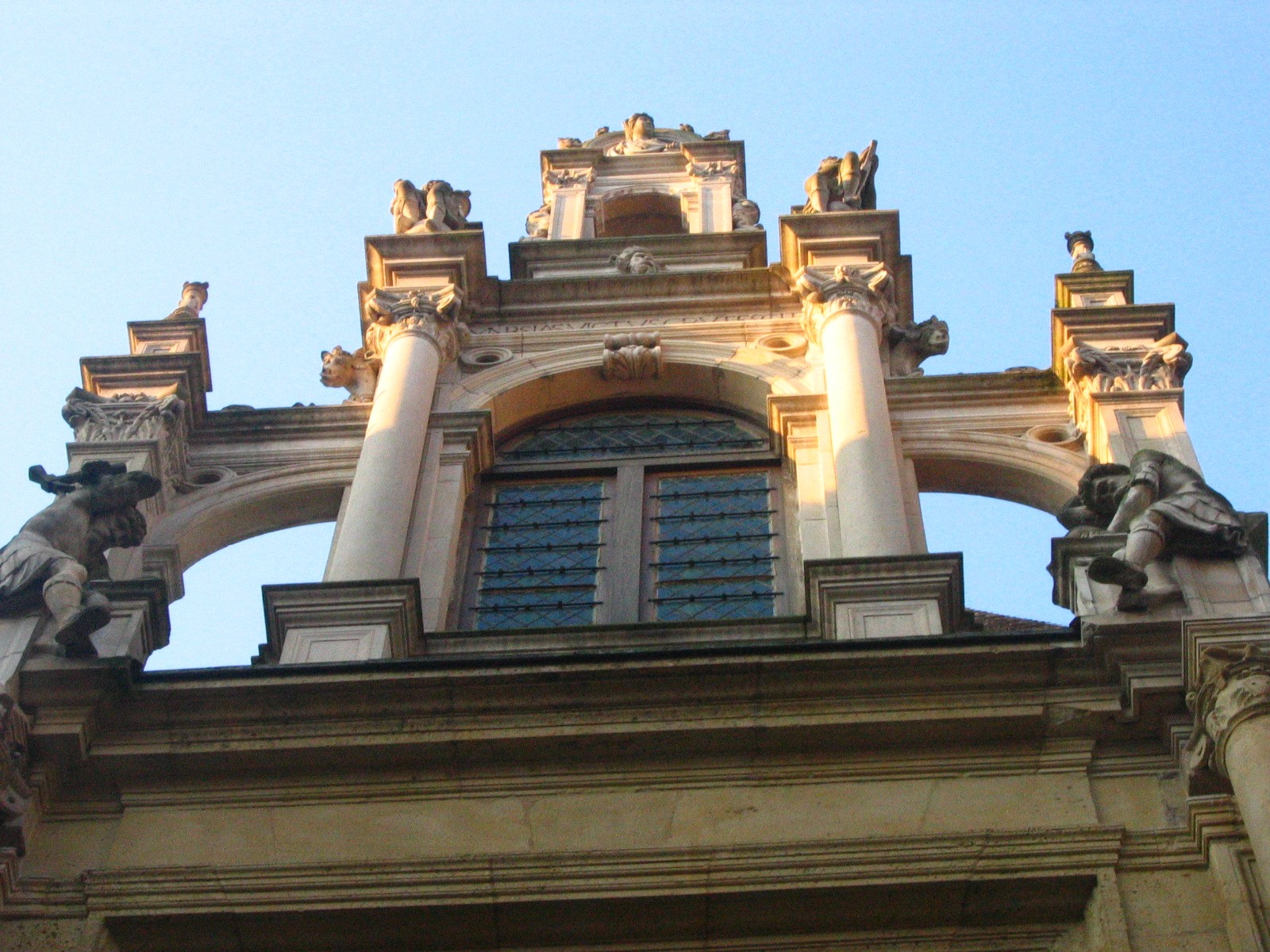
Hotel skylight

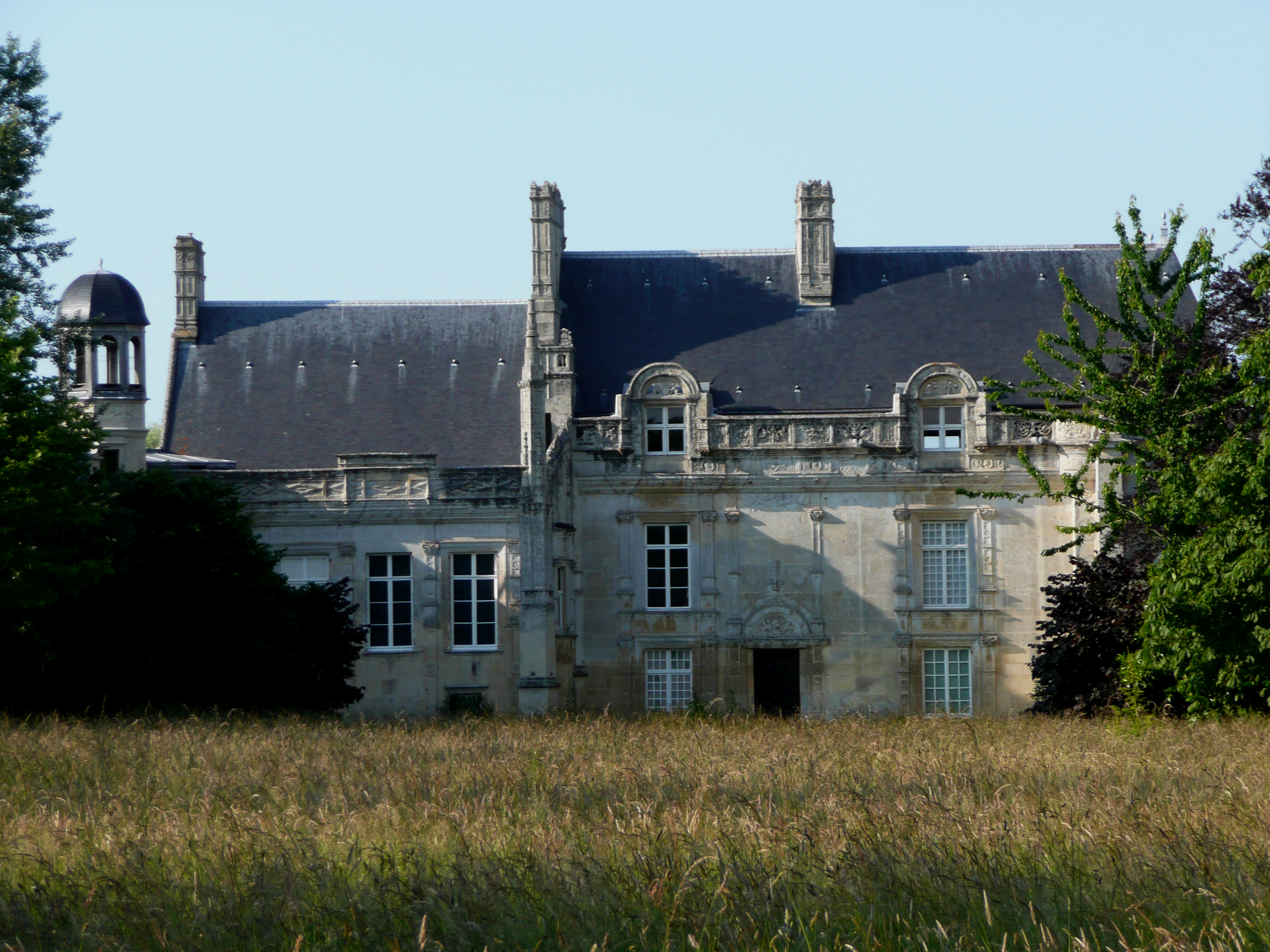
South wing of the Château de Lasson

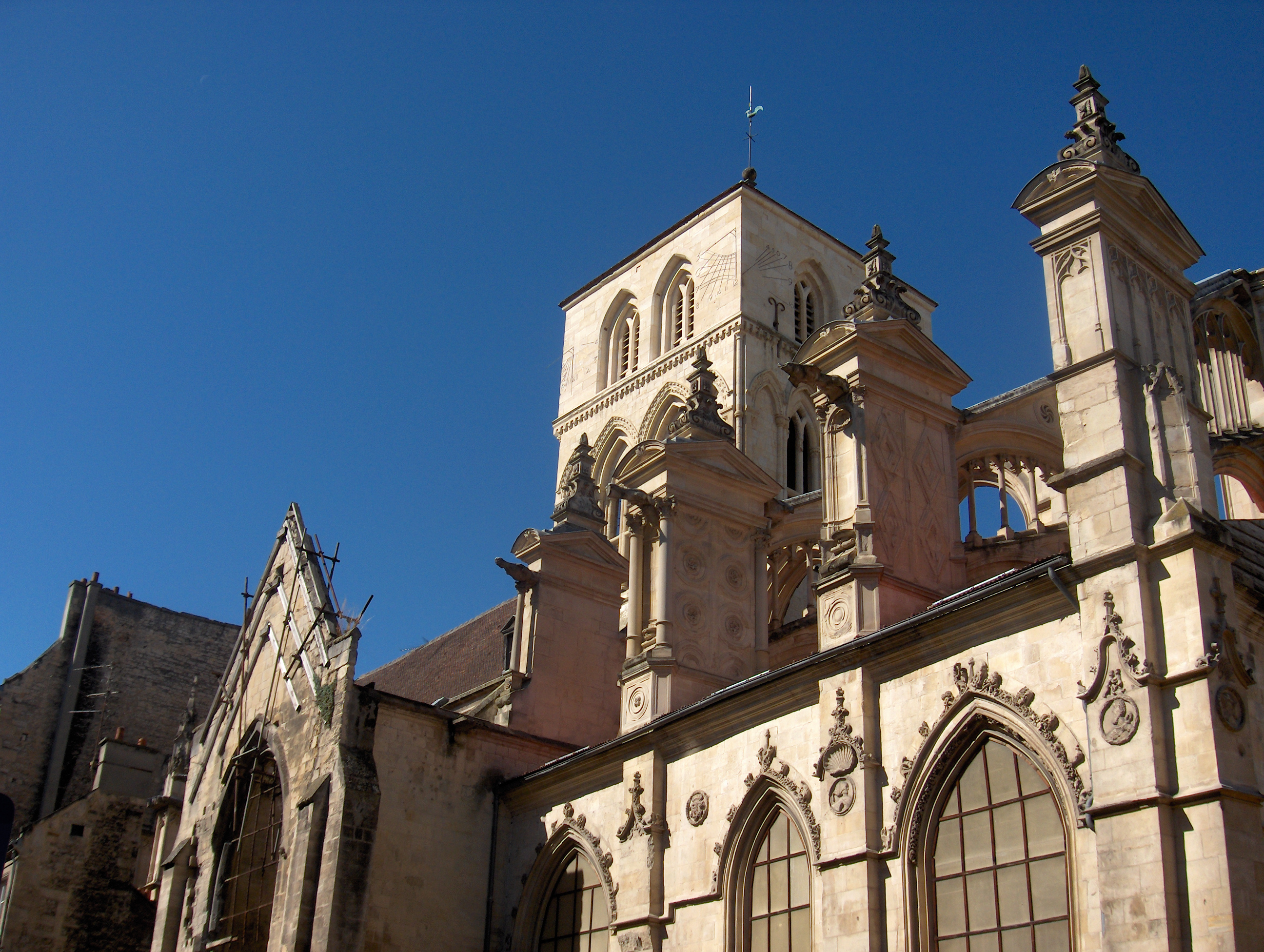
Choir of Vieux Saint-Sauveur
