= Church of Saint-Pierre, Caen =

Church in Caen, France

Coordinates: 49°11′3″N 0°21′39″W

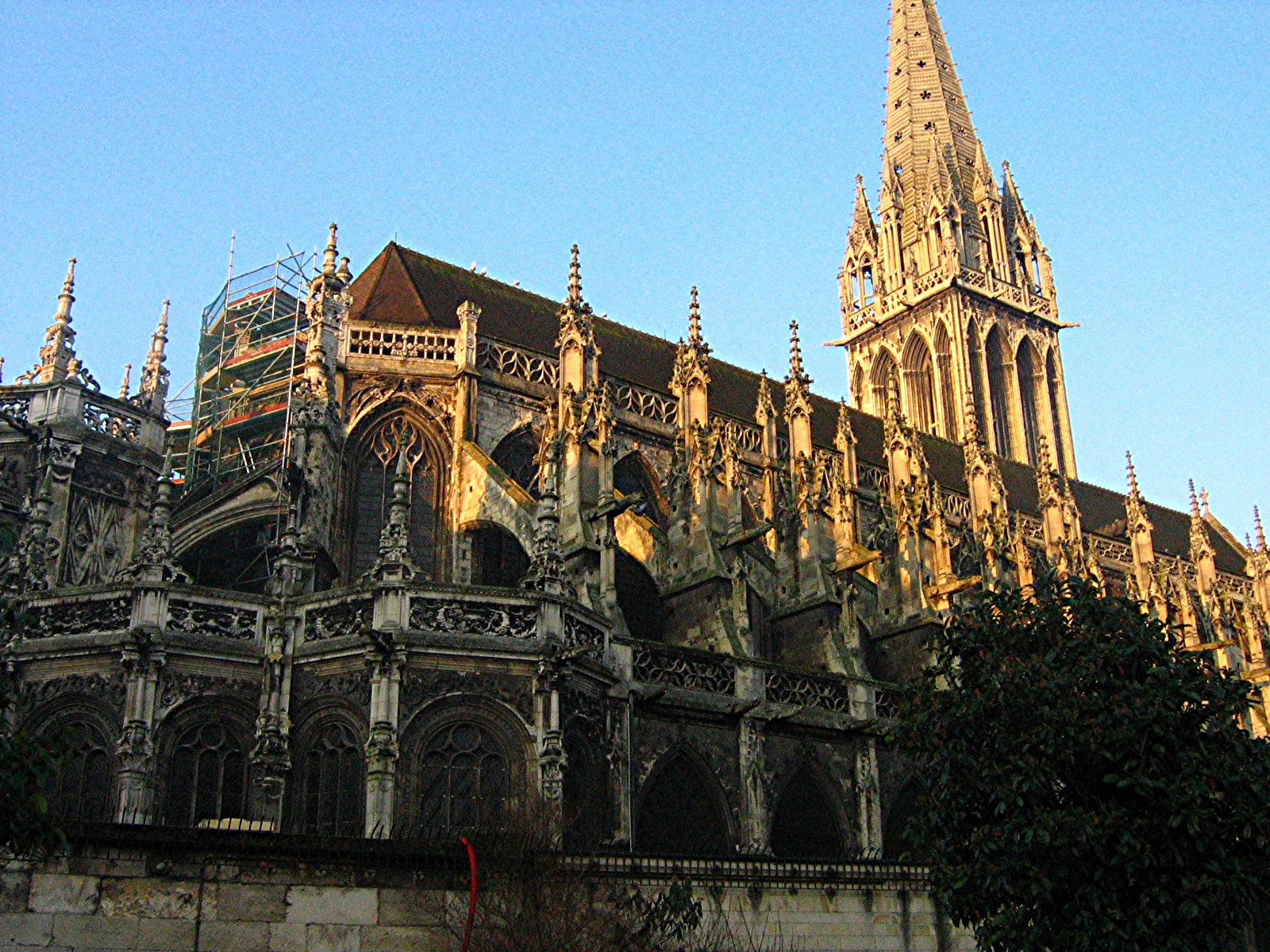
Church of Saint-Pierre

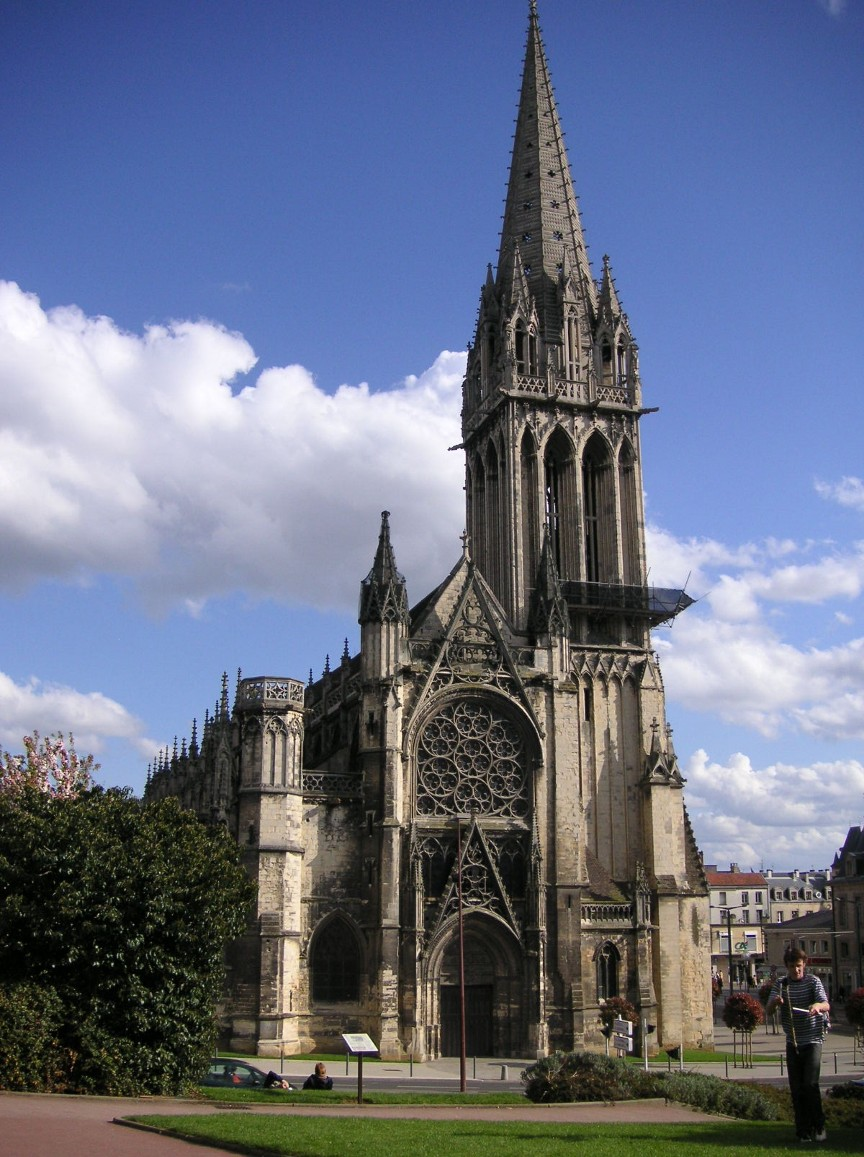
Façade.

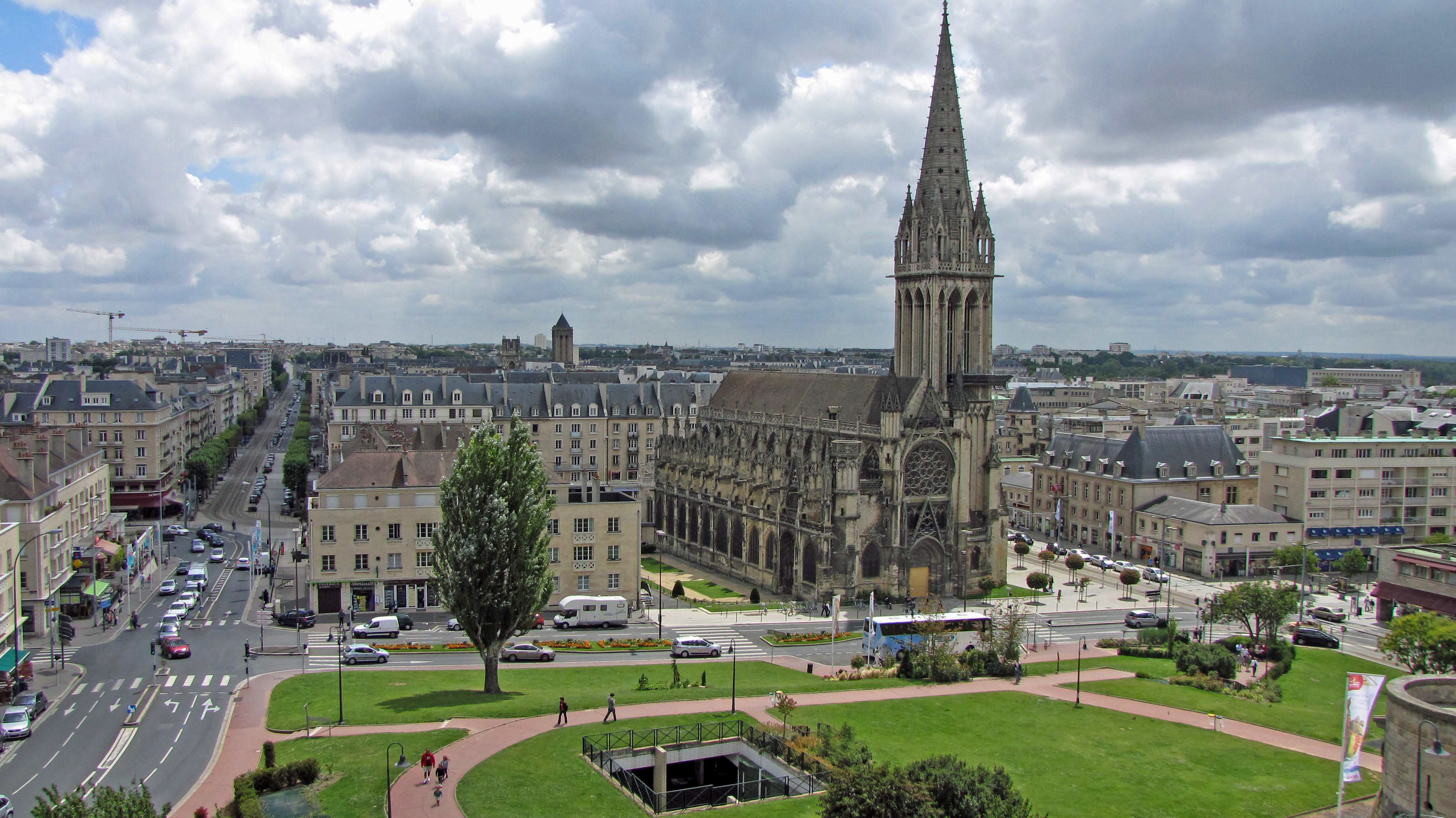
Church of St. Pierre seen from the ramparts of the Château de Caen.

The Church of Saint-Pierre (French: Église Saint-Pierre) is a Roman Catholic church located on the Place Saint-Pierre in the centre of Caen in Normandy, northern France. It is dedicated to Saint Peter.

Known as Saint-Pierre of Darnetal, Saint-Pierre-sous-Caen, Saint-Pierre-du-Châtel, Saint-Pierre-en-Rive, this church, often mistakenly called by the tourists "the cathedral", as it was the largest religious building of Bourg-le-Roi; special care was therefore given to its development.

The construction of the present building took place between the early 13th and the 16th centuries. It was in this church that during the Middle Ages the main public ceremonies took place. For example, when Henri IV abjured the Protestant religion, putting an end to religious wars, it was in St Peter's Church that the Te Deum was sung in the presence of the civil and religious representatives of the whole city. The spire of the church was destroyed on 9 June 1944 by a shell fired at German forces from the Royal Navy battleship HMS Rodney, and has since been rebuilt.

The eastern apse of the church was built by Hector Sohier between 1518 and 1545. The interior choir and the exterior apse display an architecture that embodies the transition from Gothic to Renaissance.

It ceased to be a church building on November 20, 1793, and became a Temple of Reason, and was from 1793 to 1795 used as a venue for the 'Culte de l'Être supreme', after which it was used for Catholic worship from June 4, 1795.

Until around the mid-19th century, the eastern end of the church faced onto a canal that was then covered and replaced by a road. Various artists and engravers recorded this relation of the church to the canal; for instance, the Scottish painter David Roberts made several very similar views, one of which (dated to c. 1830) is in Musée des Beaux-Arts in the Château de Caen (Caen Castle).

This church building is the subject of a classification as historical monument by the list of 1840.

Architectural Details

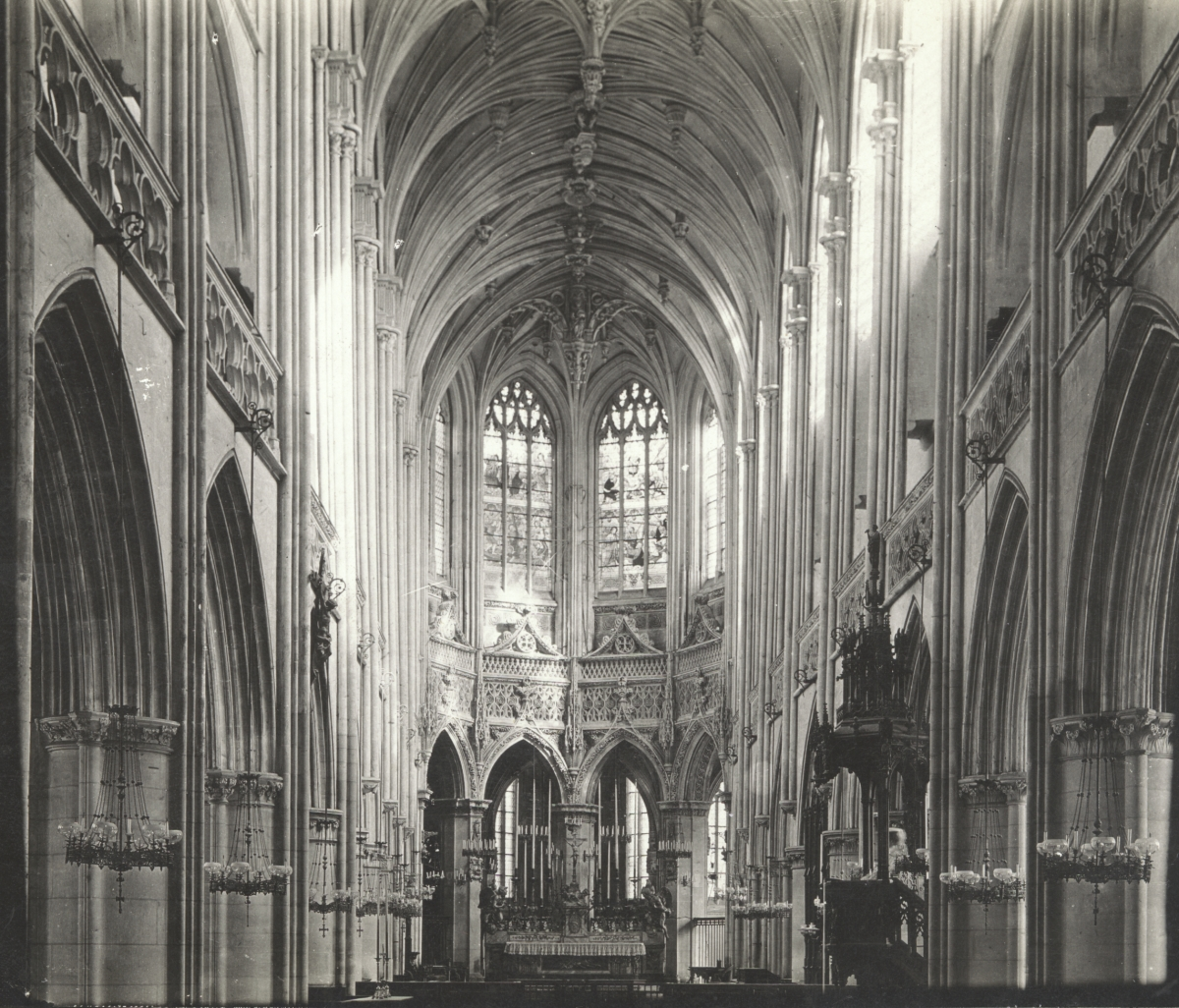

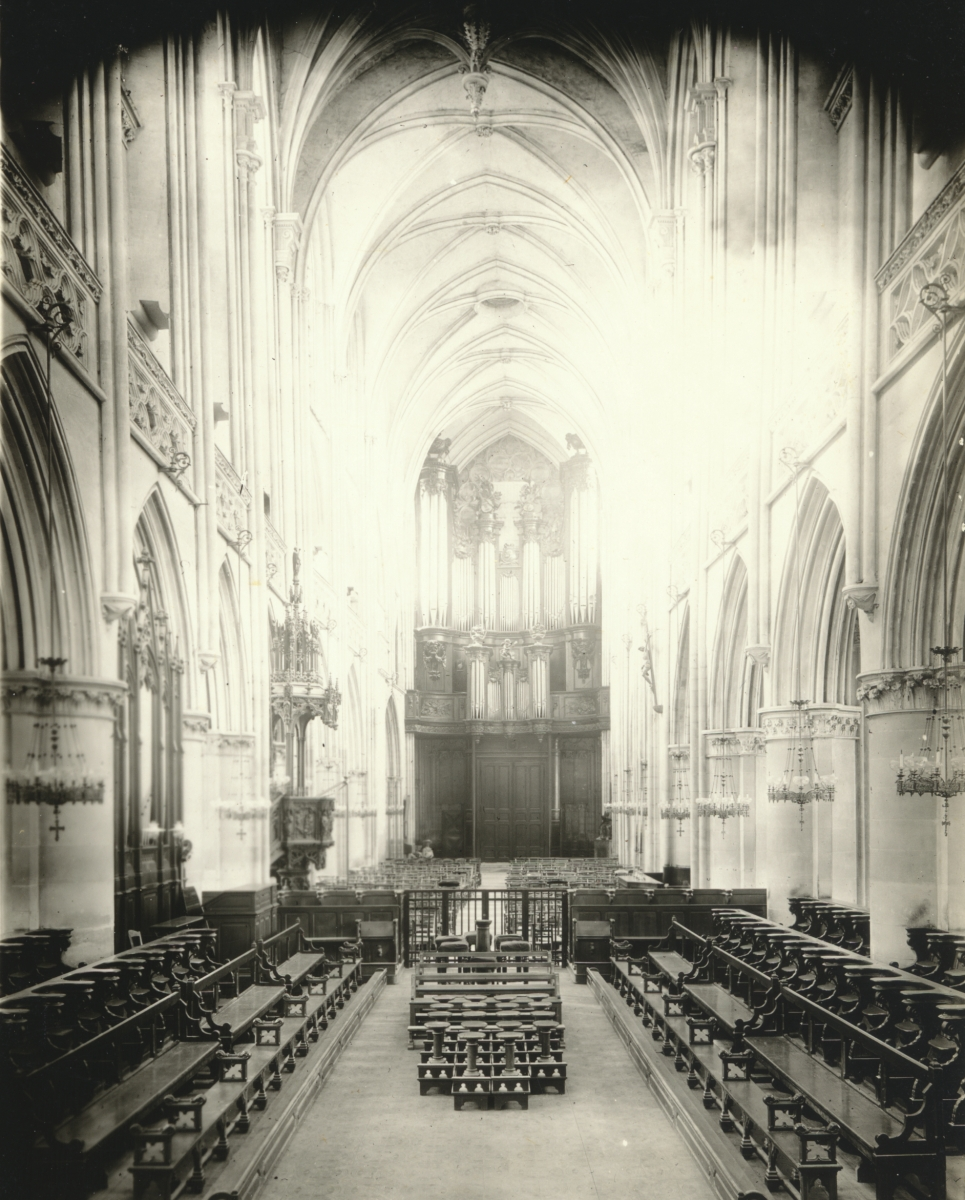

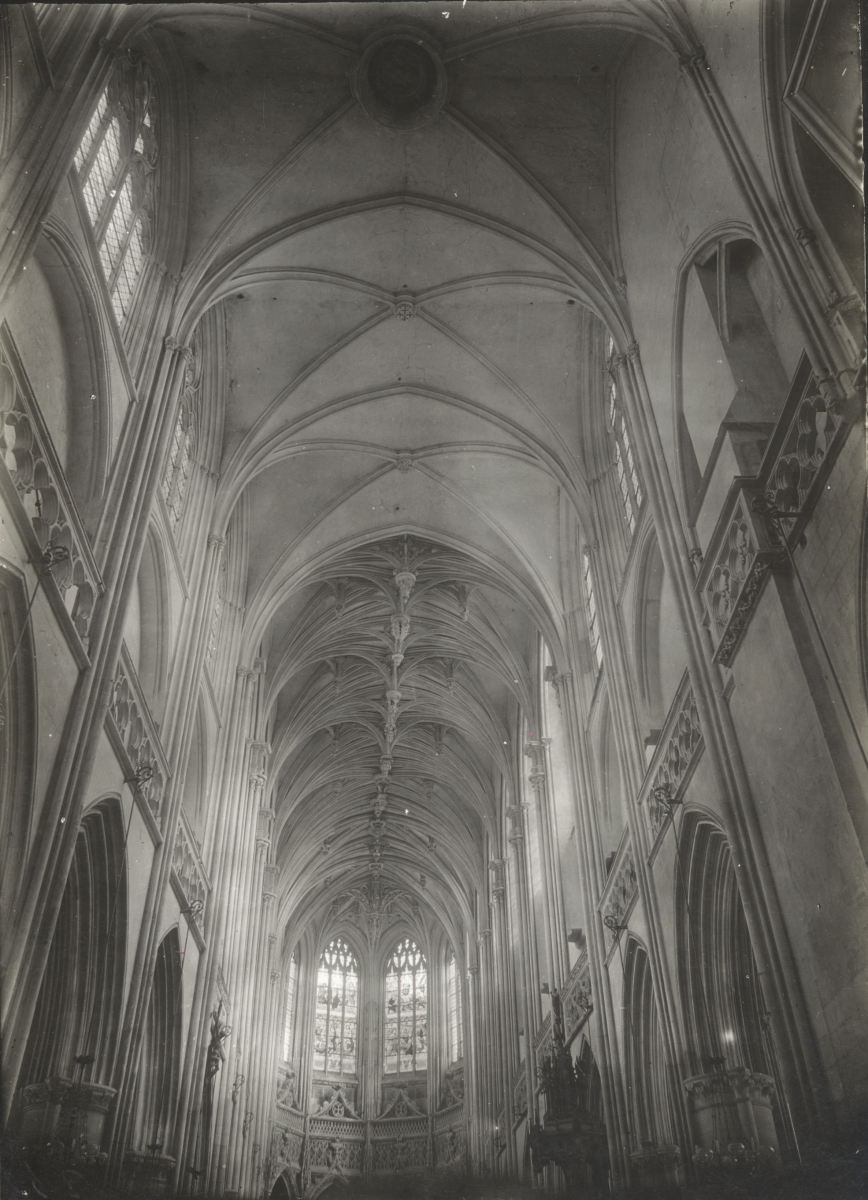

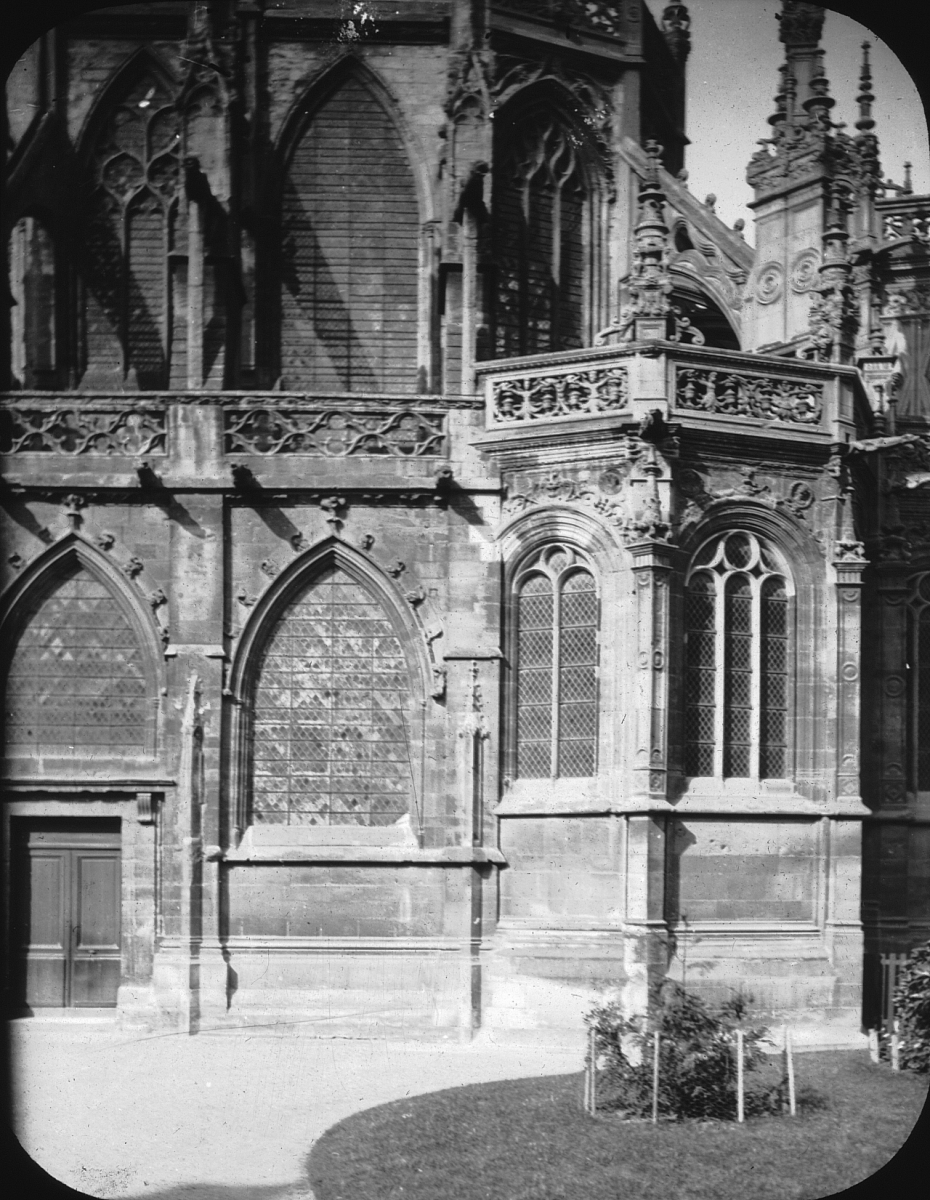

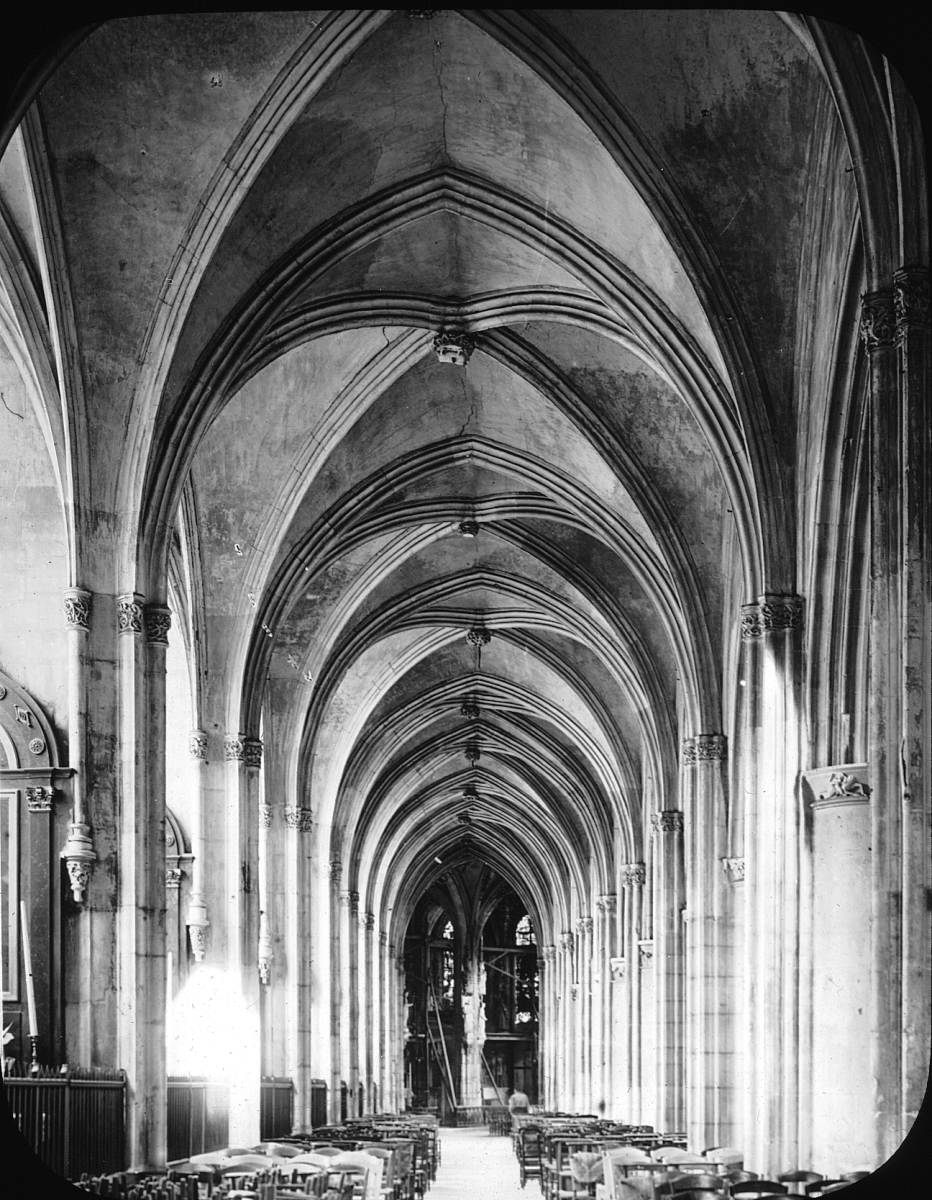
