= Sohier =

Sohier is a surname. Notable people with the surname include:

- Alice Ruggles Sohier (1880–1969), American artist
- Edward Dexter Sohier (1810–1888), American lawyer
- Elizabeth Putnam Sohier (1847–1926), American philanthropist
- Hector Sohier, Normand architect
- Sage Sohier, American photographer and educator
