= Horsdorf =

Coordinates: 50°05′06″N 11°00′42″E

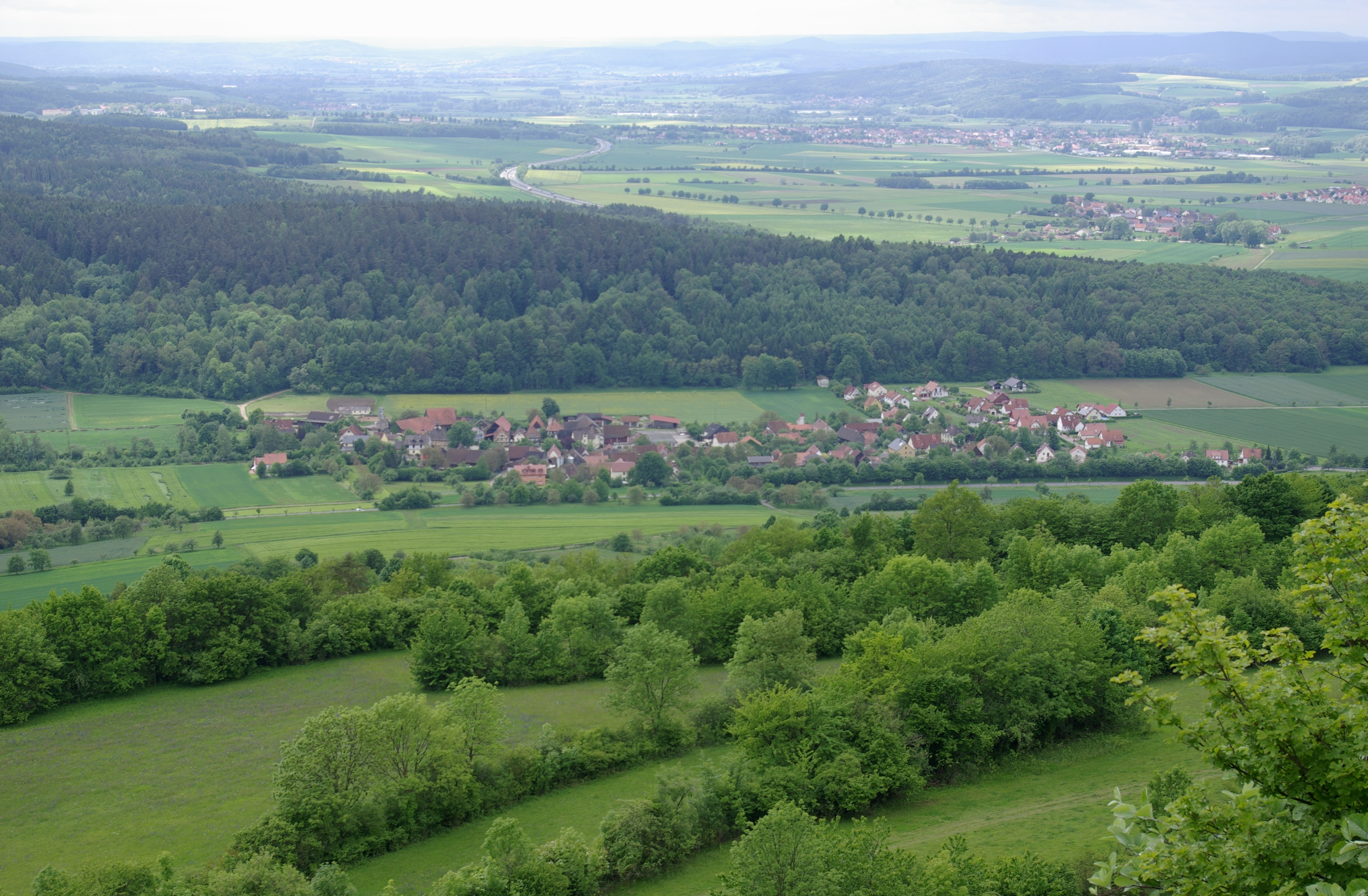
Horsdorf seen from Staffelberg

Horsdorf is a district of Bad Staffelstein in Upper Franconia. It has around 200 residents and won the gold in the state contest Unser Dorf soll schöner werden in 1995. It also won the gold in the European contest Entente Florale in 1997.

In Horsdorf, there was an area of 5.08 hectares in 1887, where wine was grown. This winery was ruined by the infestation of Grape Phylloxera. Today there is once again a vineyard in Horsdorf, where red wine is made.
