= Church of Vieux Saint-Sauveur de Caen =

Church in Normandy, France

Coordinates: 49.183°N 0.368°W

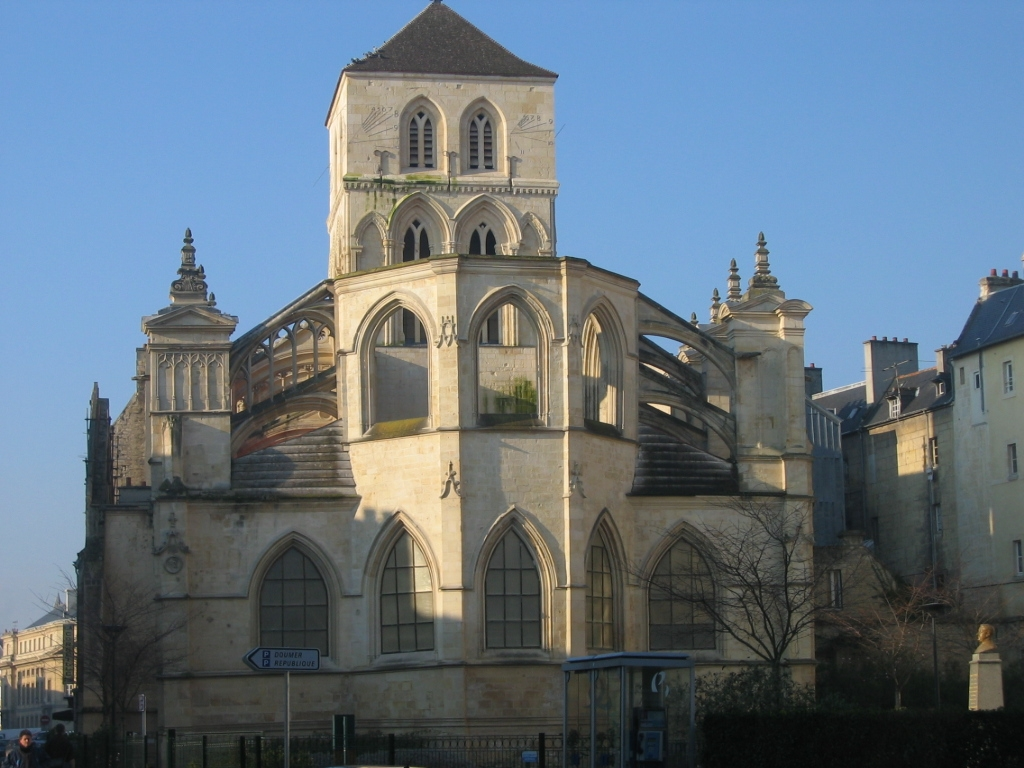
St. Sauveur in Caen

The Church of Old Saint-Sauveur is a former place of worship on the Place Saint-Sauveur in the old town center of Caen, France. Before the French Revolution, the church was a parish and was called just Saint-Sauveur Church. It took its current name in 1802 when the Notre-Dame-de-Froide-Rue church, which became the center of the new parish, was renamed Saint-Sauveur Church in Caen. The church has been classified as a historical monument since 29 June 1951.

== History ==
The church Saint-Sauveur, probably founded at the end of the Carolingian era, is a building whose oldest parts date back to the end of the 11th century or early 12th century (for the tower in particular). It was called St-Sauveur-du-Marché from 1130, reflecting the former name of its location. It was reworked several times during the fourteenth and fifteenth centuries. A new choir was built between 1530 and 1546 in the flamboyant Gothic style.

In 1698, the cemetery surrounding the church was moved to enlarge the Place Saint-Sauveur; the place left free on the street of the Chain (current Pasteur Street) and the rue Saint-Sauveur is then invaded by houses that come to lean on the church. When the Place Saint-Sauveur was redeveloped in depth in the second half of the 18th century, the 15th century facade was destroyed and a new classical style portal was built a little further west. The floor area of the church is 754 square metres (8,120 sq ft).

The parish was part of the deanery of Caen, in the diocese of Bayeux. In February 1791 the negotiations begin between the municipality and the Directory to reorganize the parishes of Caen. It was planned to close the Saint-Sauveur church and transfer its title to the Cordeliers church. The royal ordinance of 12 July 1791 effectively closed the church, but its title was ceded to Notre-Dame de Froide-Rue, which then took the name of Saint-Sauveur. In the 19th century, the old church, now called the Old Saint-Sauveur, was transformed into a grain market, then a butter market. On 9 August 1837, the city council decided that the spire built in the sixteenth century had to be demolished because of its dilapidated state, despite protests from Caen's inhabitants at the time. During the Battle for Caen in 1944, it was significantly damaged. The destruction of the Palace of Faculties helped to clear the view of the surroundings of the church, a public garden having been built in its location.

Since the end of the 1980s, it has been the subject of numerous restorations (flying buttresses, choir and lately, cross of the transept). Frescos dating from the second half of the 16th century have been unearthed on the vault.
