= Zálší (Tábor District) =

- Municipality
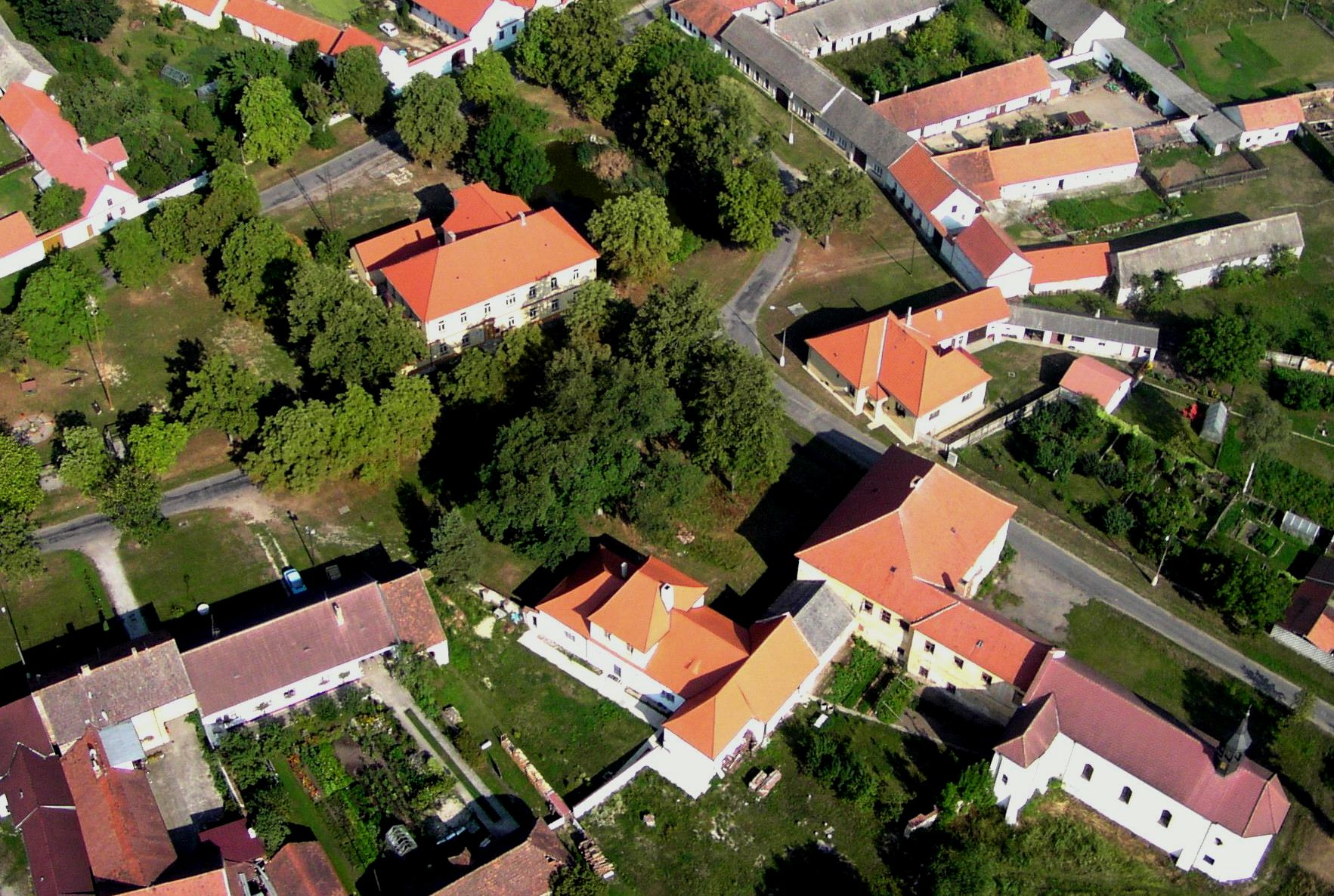
- Aerial view of the centre of Zálší

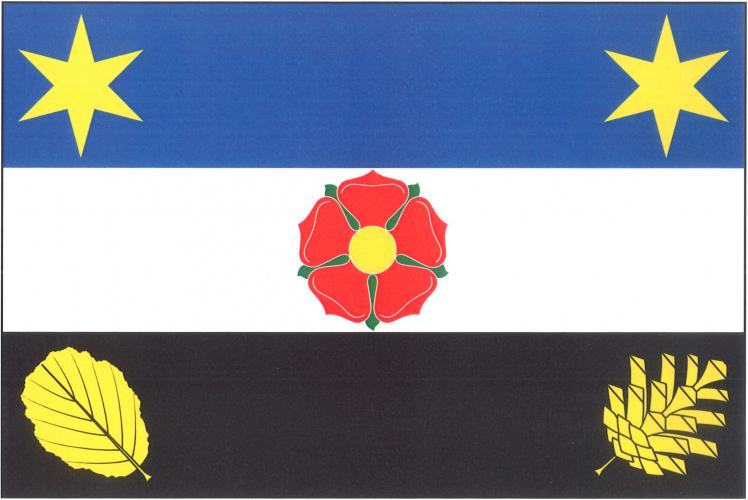
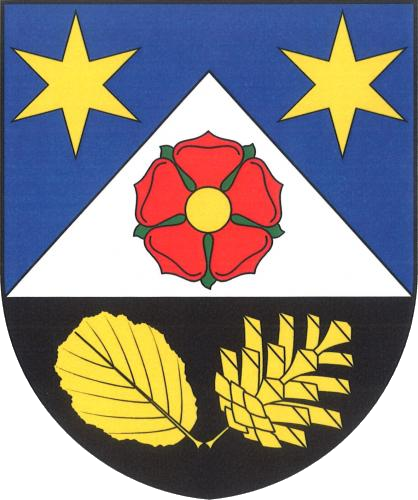
- Flag Coat of arms

- Location in the Czech Republic
- Coordinates: 49°13′5″N 14°35′57″E
- Country: Czech Republic
- Region: South Bohemian
- District: Tábor
- First mentioned: 1347

Area
  - Total: 8.92 km^{2} (3.44 sq mi)
- Elevation: 422 m (1,385 ft)

Population (2026-01-01)
  - Total: 231
  - Density: 25.9/km^{2} (67.1/sq mi)
- Time zone: UTC+1 (CET)
  - Summer (DST): UTC+2 (CEST)
- Postal code: 391 81
- Website: www.zalsi.eu

Zálší is a municipality and village in Tábor District in the South Bohemian Region of the Czech Republic. It has about 200 inhabitants.

Zálší lies approximately 23 kilometres (14 mi) south of Tábor, 29 km (18 mi) north of České Budějovice, and 98 km (61 mi) south of Prague.

== Administrative division ==
Zálší consists of two municipal parts (in brackets population according to the 2021 census):

- Zálší (170)
- Klečaty (37)

== History ==
The first written mention of Zálší is from 1347.

== Demographics ==
Historical population
Year	Pop.	±%
1869	649	—
1880	692	+6.6%
1890	679	−1.9%
1900	642	−5.4%
1910	652	+1.6%
1921	584	−10.4%
1930	576	−1.4%
1950	435	−24.5%
1961	434	−0.2%
1970	376	−13.4%
1980	293	−22.1%
1991	260	−11.3%
2001	259	−0.4%
2011	262	+1.2%
2021	207	−21.0%
Source: Censuses
