= Tvarožná Lhota =

- Municipality
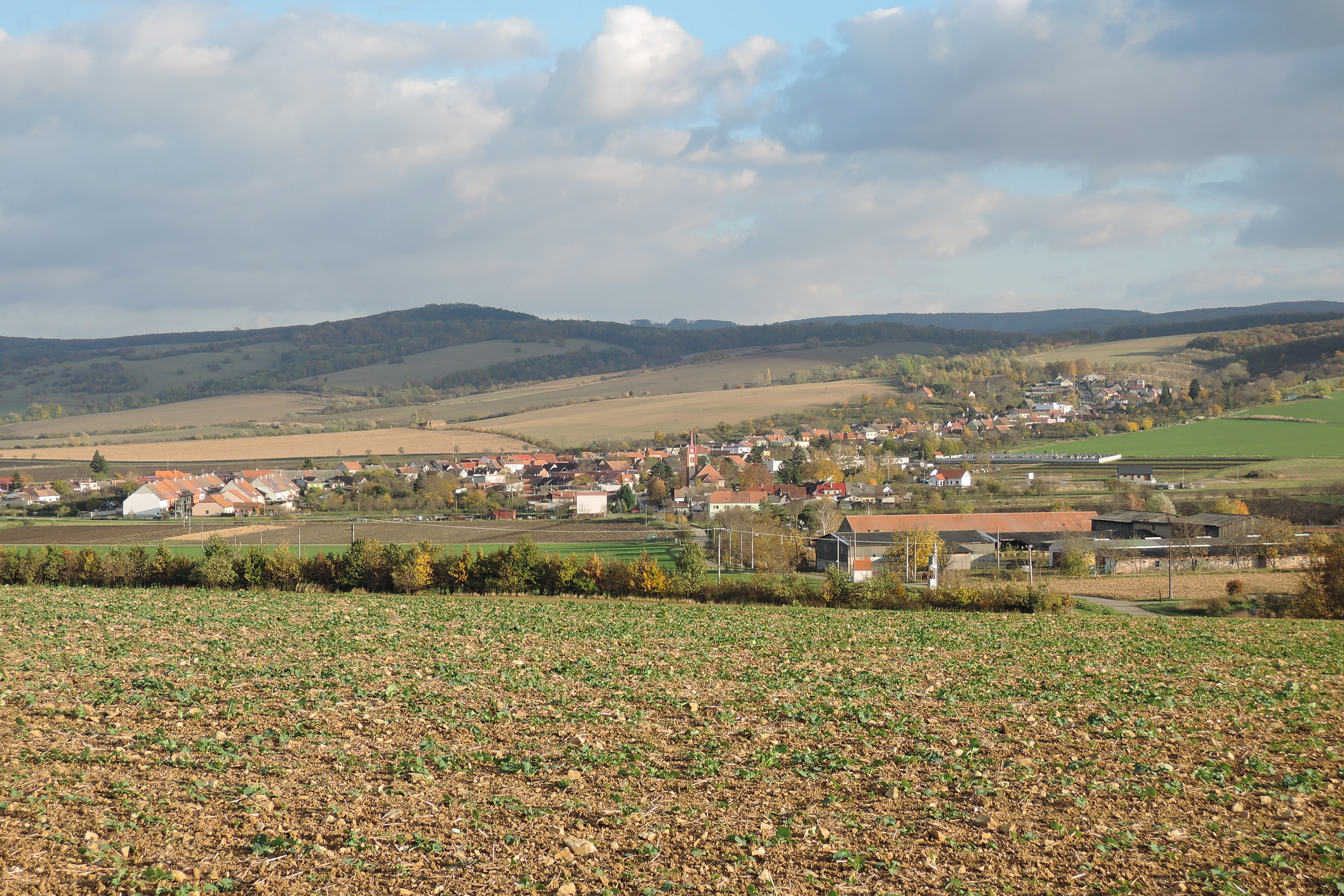
- General view

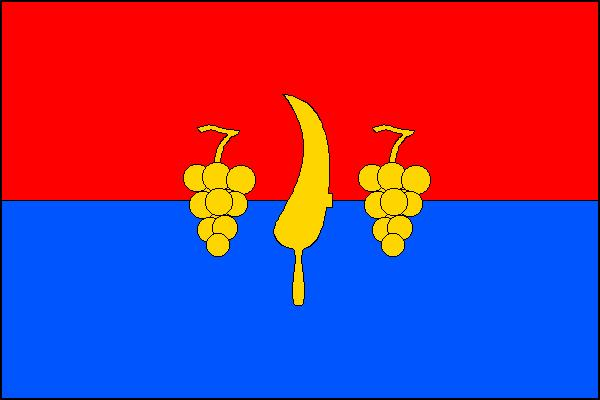
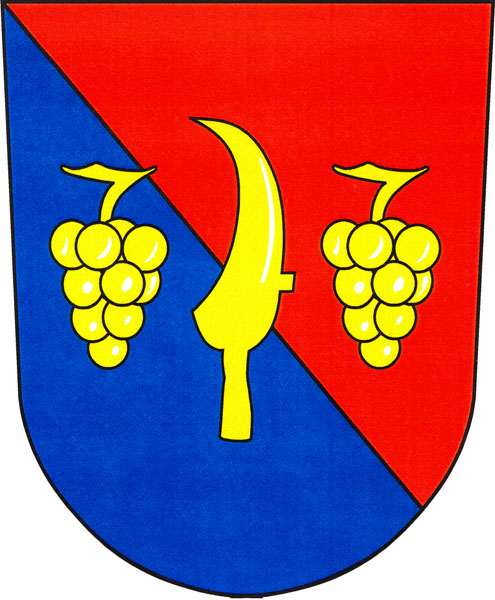
- Flag Coat of arms

- Location in the Czech Republic
- Coordinates: 48°52′38″N 17°21′34″E
- Country: Czech Republic
- Region: South Moravian
- District: Hodonín
- First mentioned: 1475

Area
  - Total: 17.46 km^{2} (6.74 sq mi)
- Elevation: 207 m (679 ft)

Population (2026-01-01)
  - Total: 921
  - Density: 52.7/km^{2} (137/sq mi)
- Time zone: UTC+1 (CET)
  - Summer (DST): UTC+2 (CEST)
- Postal code: 696 62
- Website: www.tvarozna-lhota.cz

Tvarožná Lhota is a municipality and village in Hodonín District in the South Moravian Region of the Czech Republic. It has about 900 inhabitants.

== Demographics ==
Historical population
Year	Pop.	±%
1869	863	—
1880	1,032	+19.6%
1890	993	−3.8%
1900	1,002	+0.9%
1910	939	−6.3%
1921	975	+3.8%
1930	1,011	+3.7%
1950	1,016	+0.5%
1961	1,054	+3.7%
1970	997	−5.4%
1980	936	−6.1%
1991	874	−6.6%
2001	851	−2.6%
2011	895	+5.2%
2021	881	−1.6%
Source: Censuses
