= Dobrochov =

- Municipality
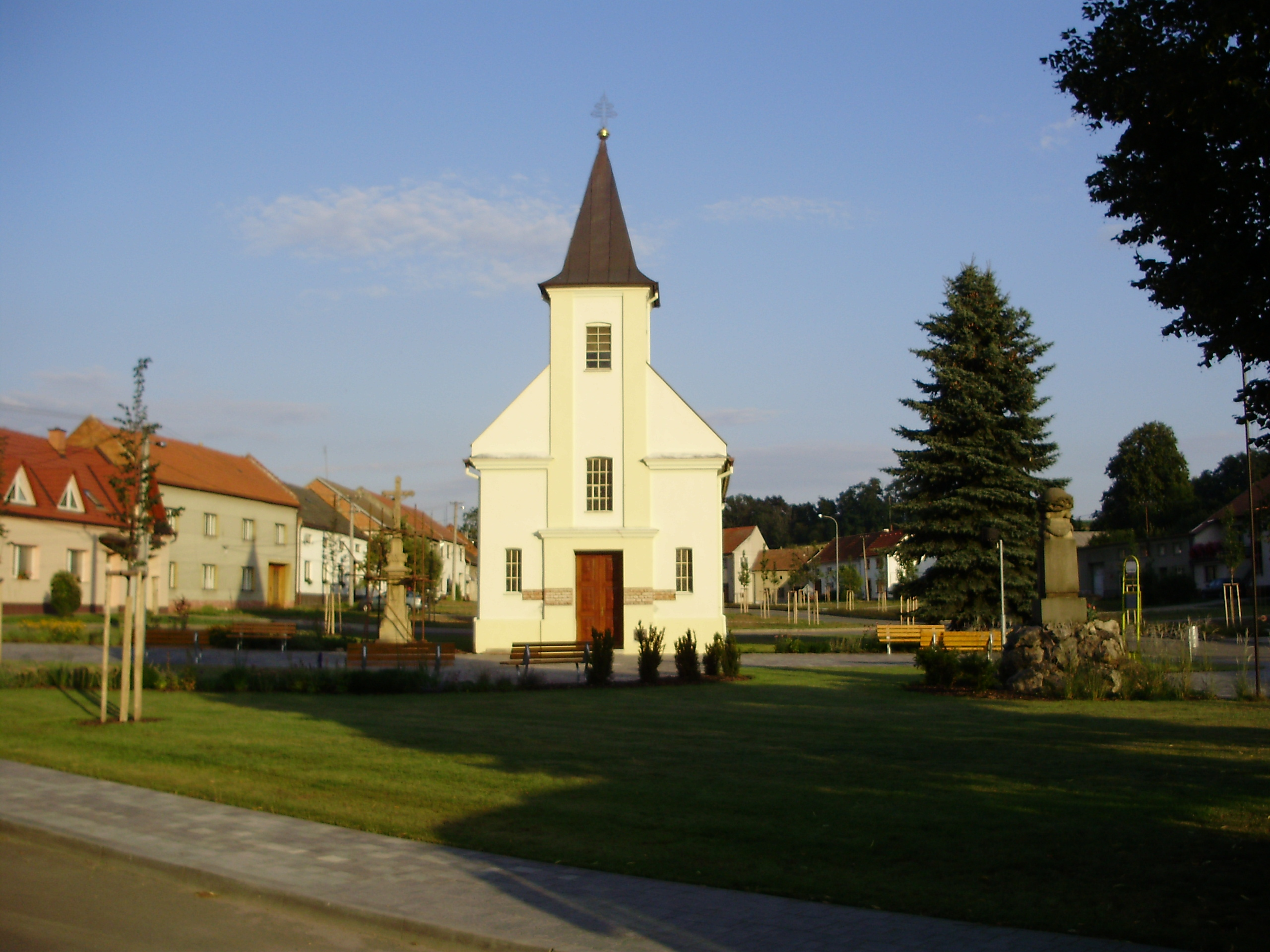
- Centre of Dobrochov

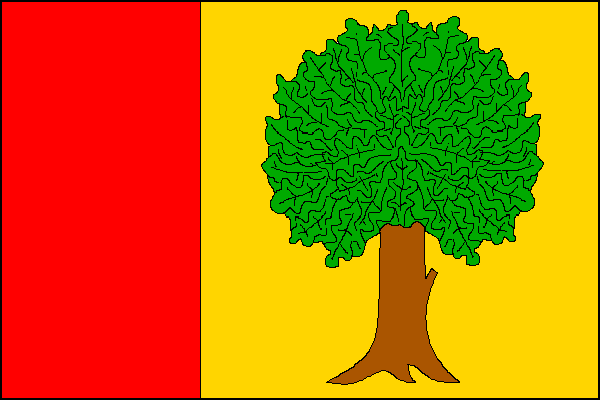
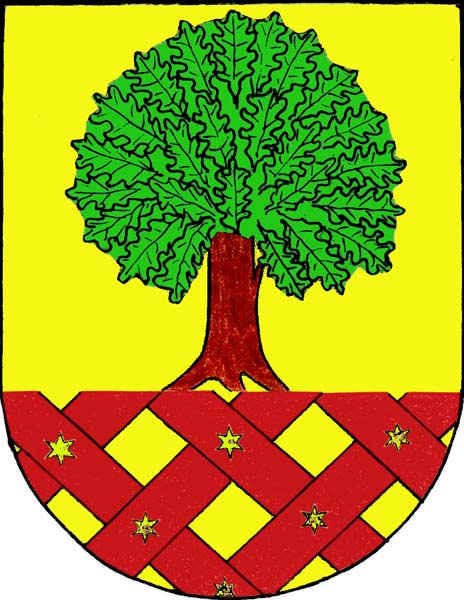
- Flag Coat of arms

- Location in the Czech Republic
- Coordinates: 49°23′9″N 17°6′20″E
- Country: Czech Republic
- Region: Olomouc
- District: Prostějov
- First mentioned: 1141

Area
  - Total: 2.53 km^{2} (0.98 sq mi)
- Elevation: 237 m (778 ft)

Population (2026-01-01)
  - Total: 364
  - Density: 144/km^{2} (373/sq mi)
- Time zone: UTC+1 (CET)
  - Summer (DST): UTC+2 (CEST)
- Postal code: 798 07
- Website: www.dobrochov.cz

Dobrochov is a municipality and village in Prostějov District in the Olomouc Region of the Czech Republic. It has about 400 inhabitants.

== Geography ==
Dobrochov is located about 9 km (6 mi) south of Prostějov and 24 km (15 mi) southwest of Olomouc. It lies in an agricultural landscape in the Upper Morava Valley. The highest point is at 298 m (978 ft) above sea level.

== Demographics ==
Historical population
Year	Pop.	±%
1869	320	—
1880	314	−1.9%
1890	296	−5.7%
1900	333	+12.5%
1910	341	+2.4%
1921	354	+3.8%
1930	338	−4.5%
1950	358	+5.9%
1961	328	−8.4%
1970	302	−7.9%
1980	254	−15.9%
1991	249	−2.0%
2001	259	+4.0%
2011	292	+12.7%
2021	330	+13.0%
Source: Censuses

== Transport ==
The D46 motorway from Olomouc to Vyškov runs through the municipality.
