= Saint-Sauveur, Caen =

Roman Catholic church in Caen, France

Church of Saint-Sauveur
- Formerly Notre-Dame-de-Froide-Rue
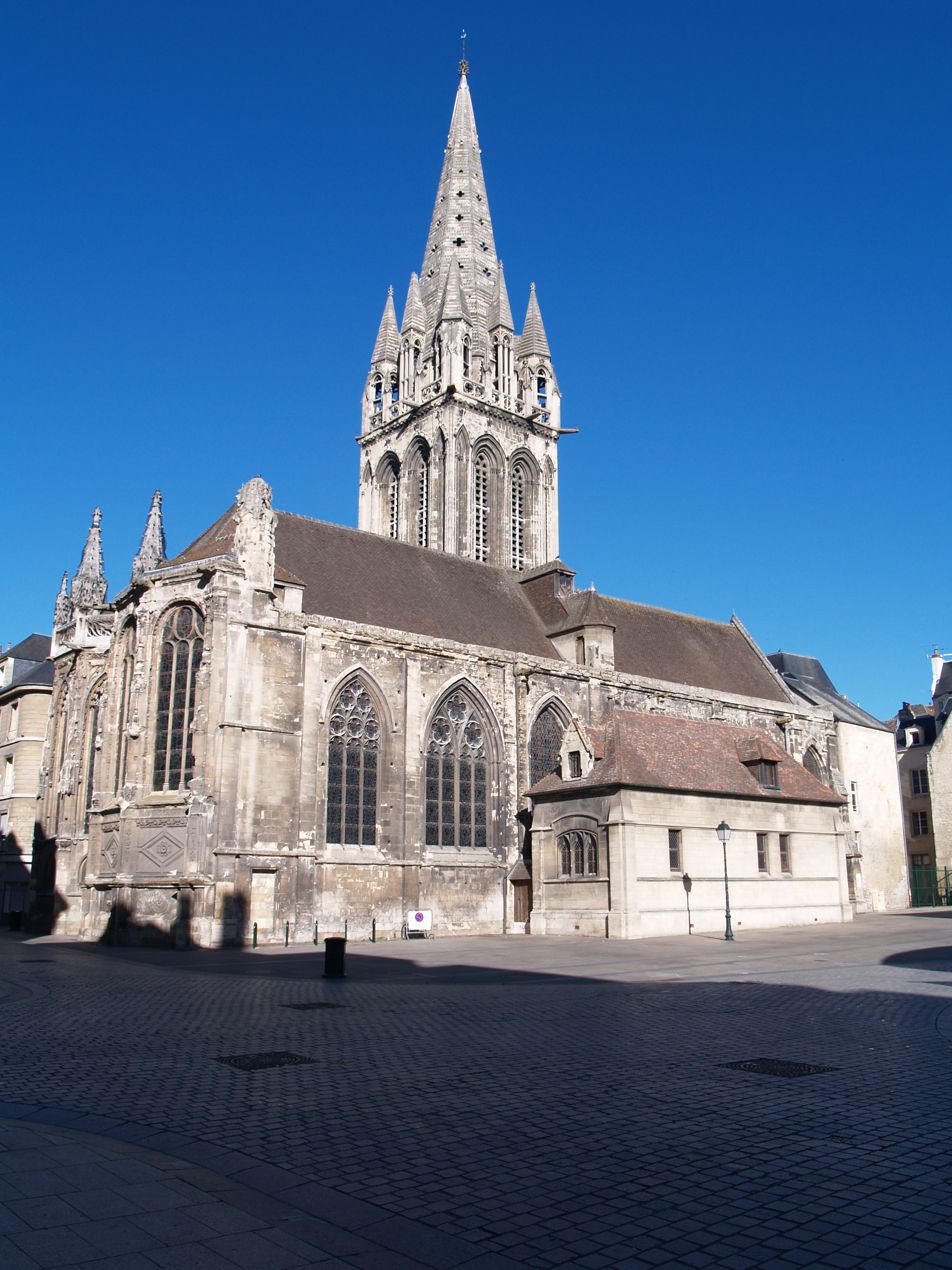
- The Church of Saint-Sauveur in Caen

Religion
- Affiliation: Roman Catholic Church
- Province: Diocese of Bayeux and Lisieux
- Rite: Roman Rite
- Status: Active

Location
- Location: Caen, Calvados, Normandy, France
- Interactive map of Church of Saint-Sauveur
- Coordinates: 49.183039°N 0.364771°W

Architecture
- Style: Gothic, Renaissance
- Completed: 16th century

The Church of Saint-Sauveur is a Roman Catholic church in the historic center of Caen, France. Prior to 1802, it was known as "Notre-Dame-de-Froide-Rue". Since then, the church has been dedicated to the Holy Saviour (Jesus Christ). The church has been listed as a historical monument since 1889.

== History ==
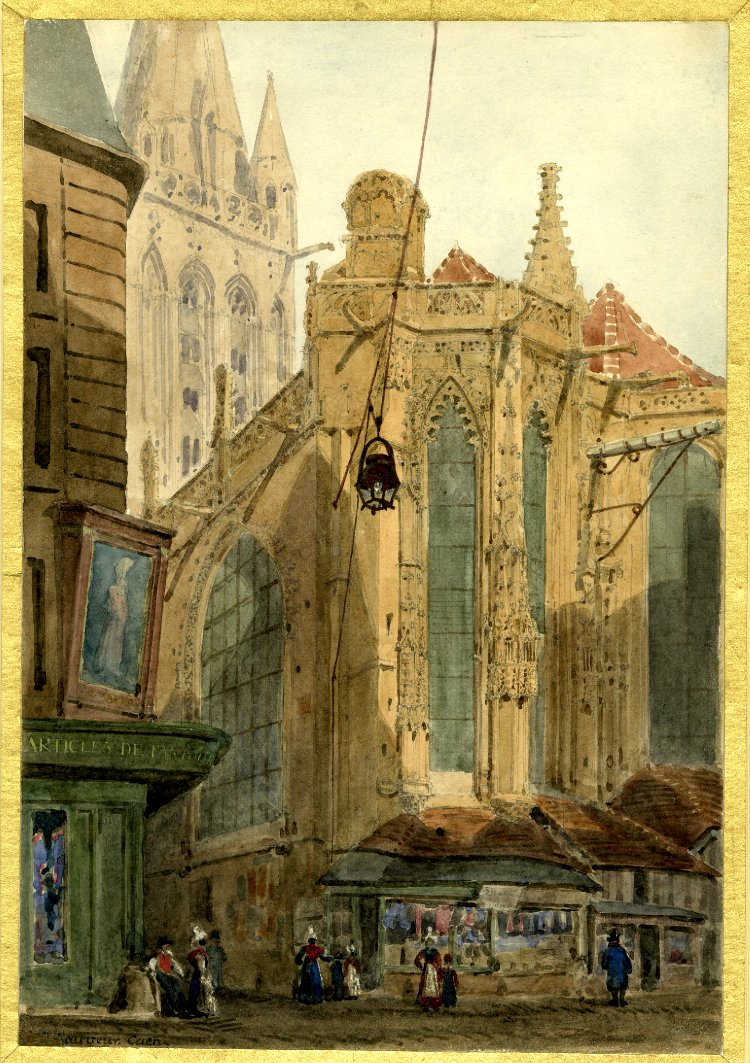
The apse, painted by Ambrose Poynter around 1830

The circumstances of the church's founding are unclear.

According to local tradition, the church was founded in the 7th century by Saint Regnobert, a bishop of Bayeux. However, this tradition is only documented from the 16th century onwards. Around 660, Saint Ouen reportedly deposited relics of Saint Marcouf at Notre-Dame during his visit to Caen. Another legend, emerging in the 18th century, claims that Saint Marcouf himself visited the church.

No remains of the original Romanesque structure exist. The earliest confirmed mention of the church appears in a papal bull issued by Pope Eugene III between 1152 and 1153. The current building was constructed in three stages: the bell tower and easternmost nave, dedicated to Saint Eustace, were built in the 14th century. During the 15th century, the church was transformed into a hall church with the addition of a second nave and an apse with three bays featuring pointed arches. In the 16th century, the apse of the Saint Eustace nave was rebuilt in a Renaissance style, completed in 1546.

The church's cemetery was relocated outside the city limits between 1784 and 1785 as part of new burial regulations. During the French Revolution, the church was temporarily closed but was reopened for worship in 1802, when it took the name and parish of the Church of Vieux Saint-Sauveur de Caen.

On 24 April 2024, the church was closed to the public following an inspection of its facades, and a safety perimeter was established.

== Architecture ==
The entire building has been listed as a historical monument since 1889. The church is notable for its parallel naves, wooden vaults, and ornate Gothic and Renaissance details. During the Battle of Caen in 1944, surrounding buildings were destroyed, leaving the church more visible than before.

=== Eastern Nave (Saint-Eustache) ===
The eastern nave, dating to the 14th century, includes a bell tower and a Renaissance apse completed in 1546. The apse features stained glass windows depicting the life of the Virgin Mary.

=== Western Nave (Rue Froide) ===
Added in the 15th century, the western nave features Gothic windows and Renaissance-style details. A grand arch was constructed to connect the two naves.
