= Cehnice =

- Municipality
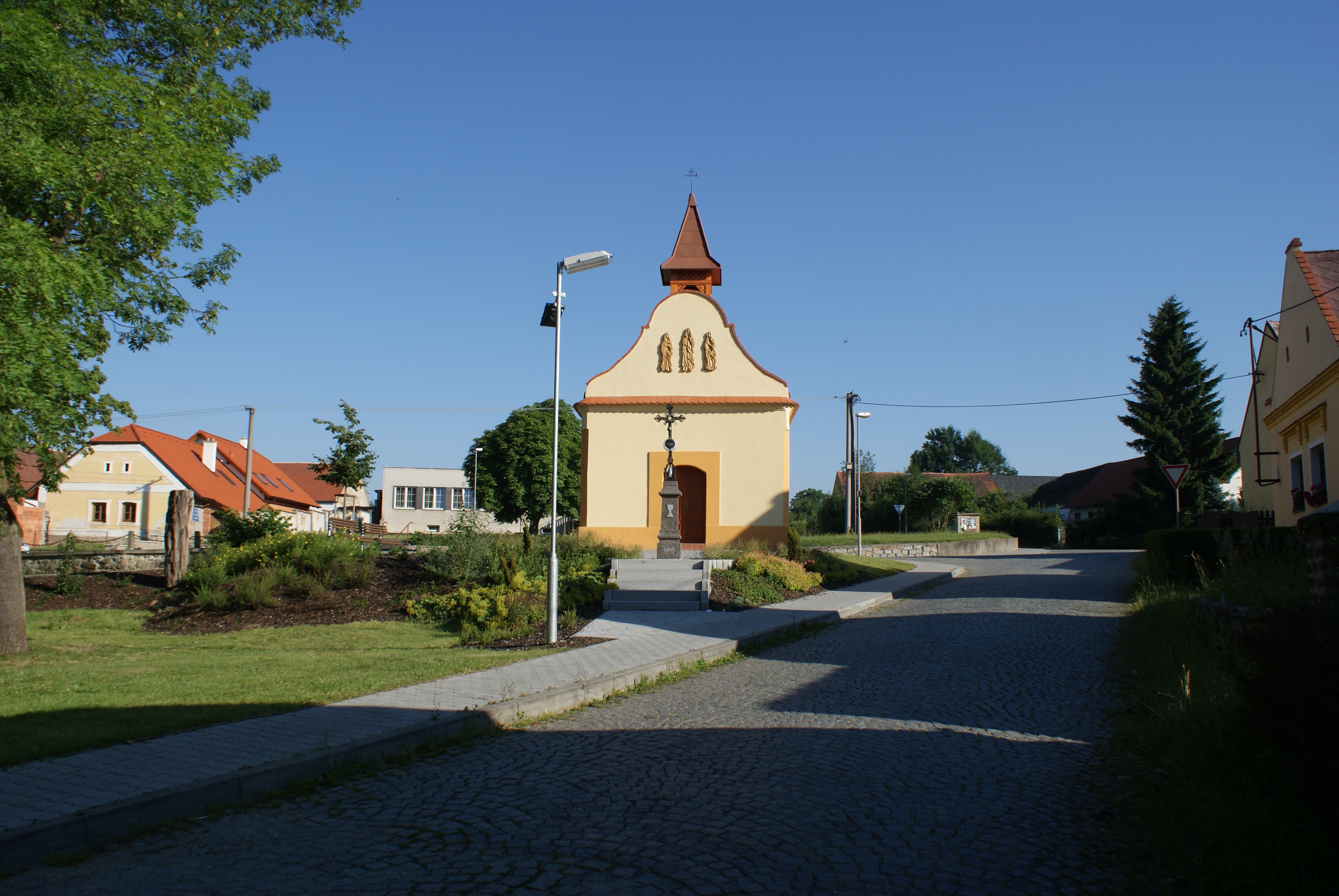
- Chapel in the centre of Cehnice

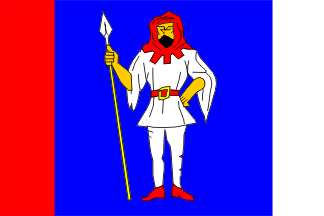
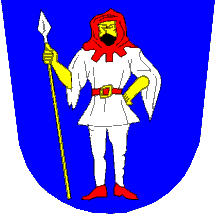
- Flag Coat of arms

- Location in the Czech Republic
- Coordinates: 49°12′55″N 14°1′46″E
- Country: Czech Republic
- Region: South Bohemian
- District: Strakonice
- First mentioned: 1342

Area
  - Total: 14.69 km^{2} (5.67 sq mi)
- Elevation: 432 m (1,417 ft)

Population (2026-01-01)
  - Total: 522
  - Density: 35.5/km^{2} (92.0/sq mi)
- Time zone: UTC+1 (CET)
  - Summer (DST): UTC+2 (CEST)
- Postal code: 387 52
- Website: www.cehnice.cz

Cehnice is a municipality and village in Strakonice District in the South Bohemian Region of the Czech Republic. It has about 500 inhabitants.

== Administrative division ==
Cehnice consists of two municipal parts (in brackets population according to the 2021 census):

- Cehnice (451)
- Dunovice (65)

== Etymology ==
The name is derived from the personal name Cehna, meaning "the village of Cehna's people".

== Geography ==
Cehnice is located about 10 kilometres (6 mi) southeast of Strakonice and 41 km (25 mi) northwest of České Budějovice. It lies on the border between the České Budějovice Basin and Bohemian Forest Foothills. The highest point is a nameless hill at 627 m (2,057 ft) above sea level. The stream Cehnický potok flows through the municipality. The municipal territory is rich in fishponds.

== History ==
The first written mention of Cehnice is from 1342, when a fortress stood here and Cehnice was in the possession of the Lords of Říčany (a branch that called themselves Cehnic of Říčany). They owned Cehnice until 1602, when it was annexed to the Štěkeň estate. In 1540, the village was promoted to a market town, but it later lost its privileges.

== Demographics ==
Historical population

Year	Pop.	±%
1869	1,012	—
1880	1,030	+1.8%
1890	1,004	−2.5%
1900	953	−5.1%
1910	892	−6.4%

Year	Pop.	±%
1921	931	+4.4%
1930	840	−9.8%
1950	651	−22.5%
1961	649	−0.3%
1970	592	−8.8%

Year	Pop.	±%
1980	561	−5.2%
1991	520	−7.3%
2001	438	−15.8%
2011	473	+8.0%
2021	516	+9.1%

Source: Censuses

== Transport ==
The I/22 road from Vodňany to Strakonice, which further continues to Klatovy, runs through the municipality.

== Sights ==
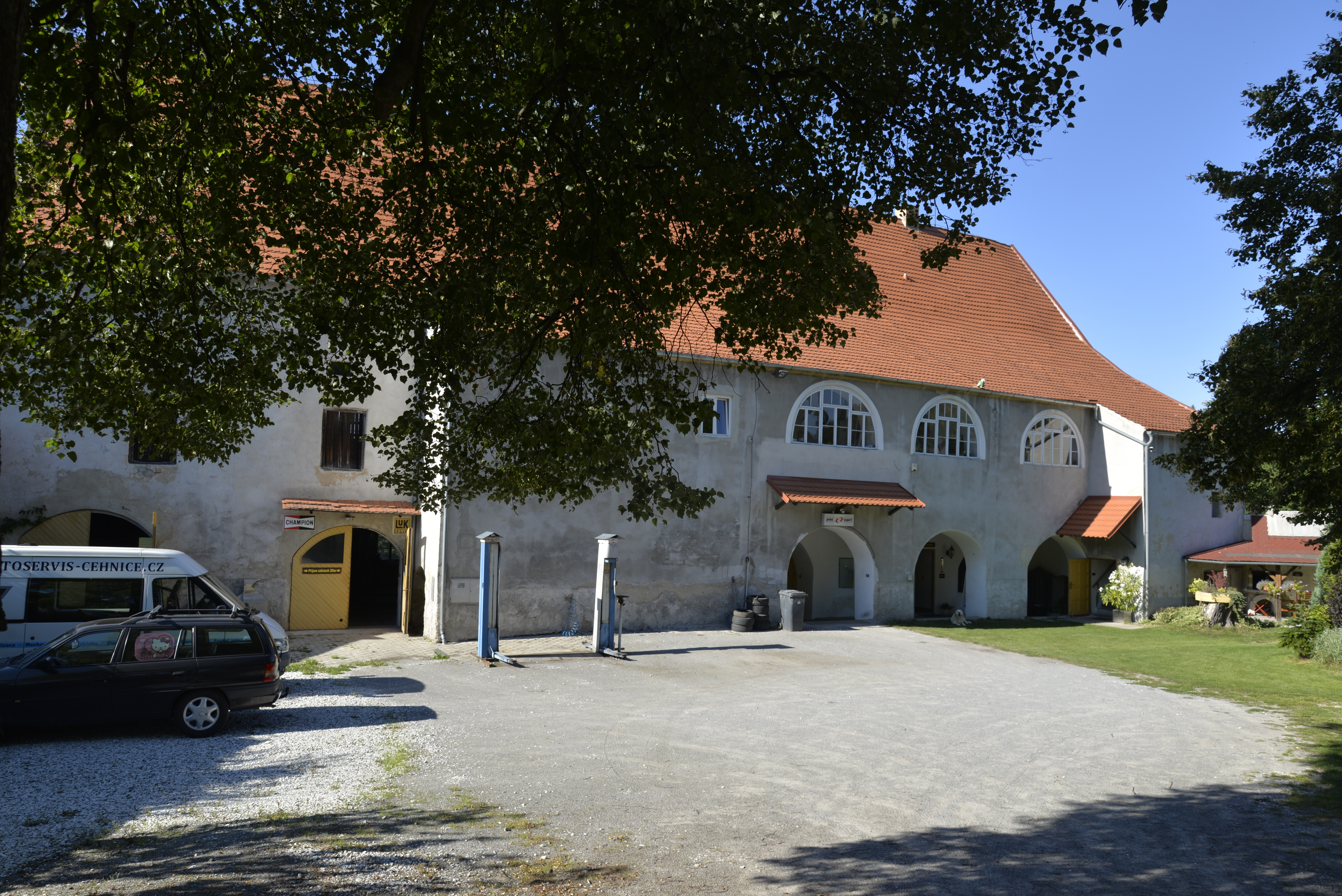
Cehnice Fortress

The main historical landmark of Cehnice is the former fortress. It dates from 1342 at the latest. In the 16th and 17th centuries, it was rebuilt in the Renaissance style. Remains of sgraffito decoration on the façade have been preserved. Today the building is privately owned and used for housing.
