= Písečná (Ústí nad Orlicí District) =

- Municipality
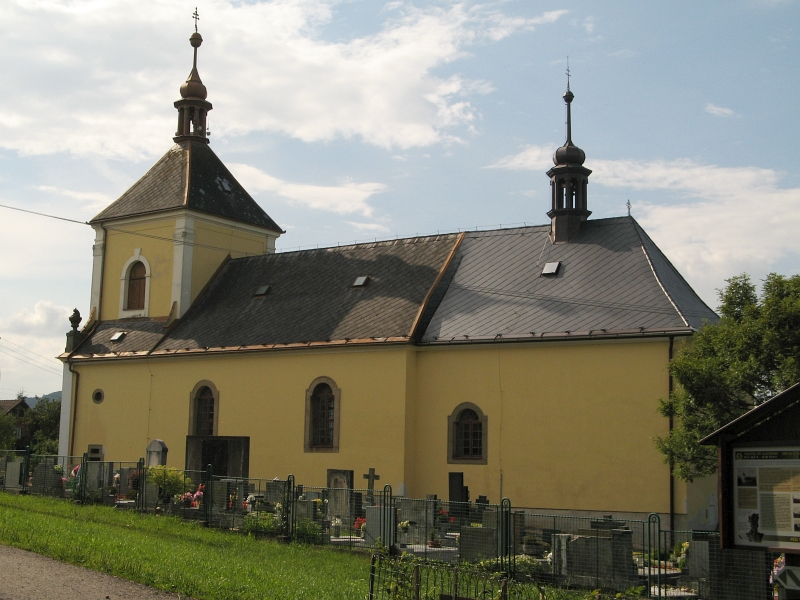
- Church of Saint Catherine

- Flag Coat of arms

- Location in the Czech Republic
- Coordinates: 50°2′43″N 16°26′53″E
- Country: Czech Republic
- Region: Pardubice
- District: Ústí nad Orlicí
- First mentioned: 1364

Area
  - Total: 8.86 km^{2} (3.42 sq mi)
- Elevation: 380 m (1,250 ft)

Population (2026-01-01)
  - Total: 586
  - Density: 66.1/km^{2} (171/sq mi)
- Time zone: UTC+1 (CET)
  - Summer (DST): UTC+2 (CEST)
- Postal code: 561 70
- Website: www.pisecnauzamberka.cz

Písečná (Czech: [ˈpiːsɛtʃnaː]; German: Schreibersdorf) is a municipality and village in Ústí nad Orlicí District in the Pardubice Region of the Czech Republic. It has about 600 inhabitants.

== Etymology ==
The name, literally meaning 'sandy', is an adjective from the Czech word písek ('sand'). It refers to the sandy water in the local stream. The German name Schreibersdorf, meaning "writer's village", was created by a wrong translation of the Czech name (writer = pisec in Old Czech)

== Geography ==
Písečná is located about 8 kilometres (5 mi) northeast of Ústí nad Orlicí and 47 km (29 mi) east of Pardubice. It lies in the Orlické Foothills. The highest point is at 532 m (1,745 ft) above sea level. The Potočnice Stream flows through the municipality.

== History ==
The first written mention of Písečná is from 1364. Existence of a wooden church is documented in 1350.

== Demographics ==
Historical population

| Year | Pop. | ±% |
|---|---|---|
| 1869 | 662 | — |
| 1880 | 680 | +2.7% |
| 1890 | 657 | −3.4% |
| 1900 | 676 | +2.9% |
| 1910 | 565 | −16.4% |

| Year | Pop. | ±% |
|---|---|---|
| 1921 | 522 | −7.6% |
| 1930 | 538 | +3.1% |
| 1950 | 395 | −26.6% |
| 1961 | 415 | +5.1% |
| 1970 | 374 | −9.9% |

| Year | Pop. | ±% |
|---|---|---|
| 1980 | 318 | −15.0% |
| 1991 | 363 | +14.2% |
| 2001 | 438 | +20.7% |
| 2011 | 506 | +15.5% |
| 2021 | 551 | +8.9% |

Source: Censuses

== Transport ==
There are no railways or major roads passing through the municipality.

== Sights ==
The main landmark of Písečná is the Church of Saint Catherine. It is originally a Gothic church with a Baroque nave from 1716. In 1781–1782, the church was rebuilt in the late Baroque style.

A significant technical monument is the local water mill. Its existence was documented to the year 1597. At the turn of the 19th and 20th centuries, it was modified into its present form. The mill has preserved technological equipment. It is occasionally open to the public.
