= Don Quixote tapestry series =

The Don Quixote tapestry series (Gobelins Manufactory)
- Artist: Charles Coypel, Jean-Baptiste Blin de Fontenay, Claude III Audran, Jacques Neilson, Michel Audran
- Year: 1714
- Completion date: 1794
- Medium: Wool and silk tapestry

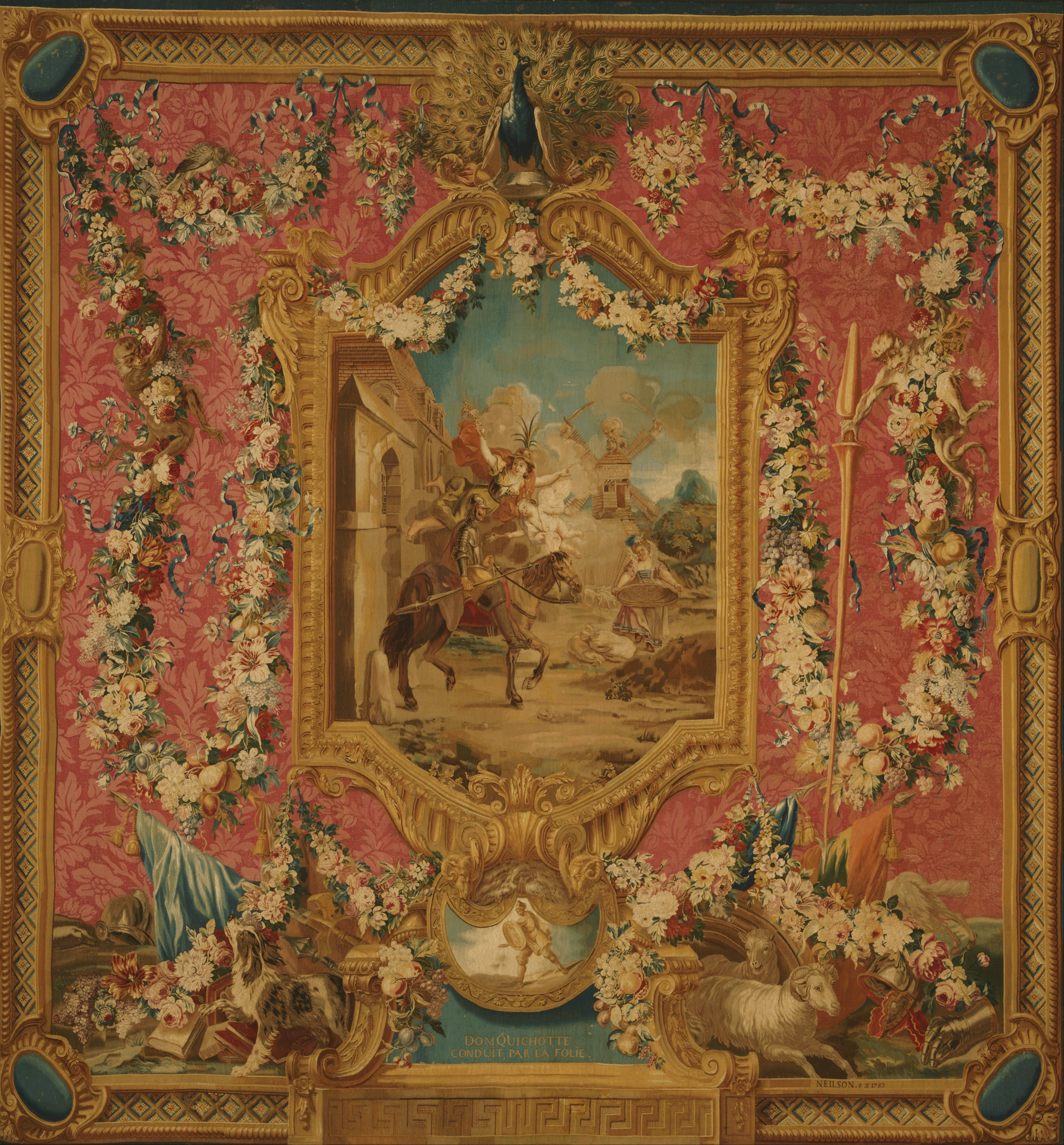
Don Quixote Guided by Folly, Setting Forth to be a Knight-Errant. 1780–1783. Woven in the workshop of Jacques Neilson at the Gobelins Manufactory, Paris.

The Don Quixote tapestry series is a popular series of 18th century mural-scale tapestries illustrating scenes from the Miguel de Cervantes novel, Don Quixote. The series was woven at the Gobelins Manufactory in Paris from 1714 to 1794, during which they were the most frequently reproduced series in the manufactory with over 200 panels woven. Their design marked the emergence of elaborate alentour borders in tapestries.

In total, the series contains 28 scenes from the novel. The cartoons (full-scale paintings to copy for the weaving) for each scene were painted by Charles Antoine Coypel, who also arranged the design for the large, surrounding decorative alentour border. The Don Quixote scenes take up comparatively little space in the total surface area, as a small scene in a gilt, flower-bedecked frame hung on a backdrop of elaborate decoration. This large decorative space known as the alentour border has the designs of other famous designers and painters at the Gobelins Manufactory, including Claude Audran III and Jean-Baptiste Belin de Fontenay the Elder.

The series was woven nine times, beginning in 1714 during the period of Philippe II, Duke of Orléans, Regent of the Kingdom from 1715 to 1723. Later weavings took place under the reign of Louis XVI until the fall of the French monarchy after the French Revolution (1789–1794).

== Gobelins Manufactory ==
In the 1660s the center of tapestry production moved to France when Louis XIV’s financial minister Jean Baptiste Colbert established three manufactories of tapestry production: Gobelins, Beauvais, and Aubusson. Gobelins in Paris would supply tapestries and other furnishings for the king’s palaces and Versailles in particular, while Beauvais and Aubusson produced for the wealthy public. The Gobelins manufactory would close in 1694 due to bankruptcy of the state treasury but reopened in 1699 and resumed production of its tapestries, which it has continued up to present day.

The Gobelins manufactory was the dyeworks of the Gobelin family and had been established in the mid-15th century. Colbert hoped to surpass rival European tapestry production centers by bringing the manufactory under the crown’s control and centralizing production of royal furnishings and diplomatic gifts. All of the products of the Gobelins Manufactory were at the disposal of the king.

The royal tapestry manufacture was first directed by Charles Le Brun, who designed many of the most famous tapestries of the period. He also recruited other accomplished designers and craftsmen, hoping to bring a new level of design to the tapestry and furnishings designs.

Throughout the 18th century the Gobelins manufactory had three workshops overseen by master workmen, or entrepreneurs: two were dedicated to the more prestigious vertical looms (haute lisse), one run by Michel Audan and the other by Pierre-Francois Cozette, and a third to the horizontal loom (basse lisse), which was run by various staff until it became more officially unified under the direction of Pierre-Francois Cozette from 1737 to 1749 then Jacques Neilson from 1749 to 1788.

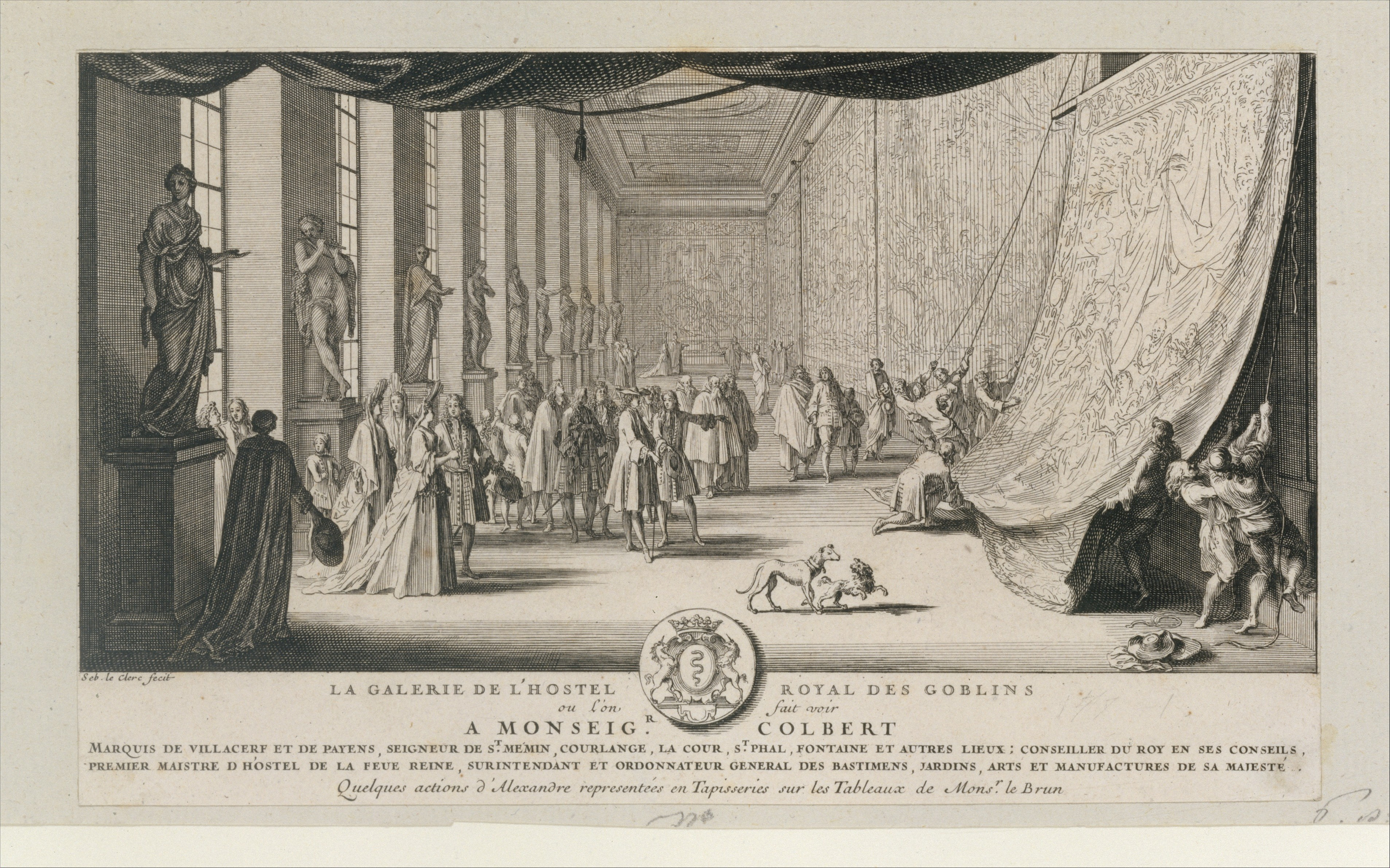
Colbert Visiting the Gobelins, Sébastien Leclerc. 1665. Etching.

Production in Gobelins customarily emphasized the vertical loom, in which the weaver was able to directly copy the painting and execute it with more mastery over the quality of workmanship and weave. Horizontal looms, on the other hand, required the cartoon to be placed beneath the weaving in process. This reversed the final image and prevented weavers from seeing the cartoon clearly while weaving.

In 1694 the manufactory closed for five years, to reopen in 1699 when it resumed tapestry production. Previously, Charles Le Brun's designs dominated the manufactory's production; but upon its reopening and with changing tastes and styles, it needed new tapestry designs. One of the first series produced was the Portieres des Dieux, which introduced a new design formula of a small central scene surrounded by a busy, decorative border space filled with ornamental motifs.

The Gobelin factory flourished again during this second era of production, producing some of the finest tapestries of the 18th century and successfully bridging the transition from Baroque style to the Rococo associated with Louis XV's reign. Charles Coypel was one of the most prominent artists of the manufactory during the 18th century, followed by Rococo artist François Boucher when he became its artistic director in 1755.

By the 1760s, the king was no longer able to support the manufactory financially, and it began to sell its tapestries to the public. Most notably, wealthy Englishmen and English royalty were enthusiastic purchasers of tapestries. One such famous set from the Jacques Neilson workshop is the Tapestry Room from Croome Court currently (2021) on display at the Metropolitan Museum of Art.

=== Commission and production ===
The court first commissioned the cartoons for the series from Coypel in 1714. Over the next 80 years the series would be woven nine times. The first set of weavings showed 15 scenes, depicting Don Quixote from leaving his home to his recovery from madness. These paintings were incorporated into the new design formula of a small scene framed in the center of an elaborately designed expanse of decoration and design motifs related to the central narrative. The backdrop imitated a wall covered in lavish fabric. The background on the first weaving was a rich yellow color composed of shaded squares in a design known as mosaique simple. The second to sixth weavings had a more elaborately patterned yellow background known as mosaique d’ornements. The Duc d’Antin ordered a set for himself in 1721 or 1722 – he wanted a series with modified dimensions to function as wide wall hangings.

The second weaving of 12 pieces was given to the Spanish ambassador in 1745.

The third weaving was made in 1733 and a fourth from 1746 to 1749 (12 pieces) that was sold to Philip, Duke of Parma. Following this, the series was in constant production in the Gobelins Manufactory until 1794. The fifth weaving had 30 pieces, the sixth had 23, the seventh had 14, and the eighth had 67.

Of the later weavings, the seventh, eighth, and ninth had a brilliant crimson background imitating damask silk, using a dye discovered by Gobelin workshop master Jacques Neilson.

The alentours were redesigned six times over the course of the series production. Because of the flexibility of background and border and the popularity of the series, the series was a natural choice for developing a stock from which the king could select gifts for all occasions and purposes. One such gift was a set Louis XVI gave to Count Michael Illarionovich Vorontsov to entice Russia to align with the French side during the Seven Years' War. Though most of the set is not known to exist today, one panel, the Memorable Judgement of Sancho is identified in the Metropolitan Museum collections.

The Coypel Don Quixote cartoons were removed from use in 1794 upon the decision of a jury from the newly established French Republic. The jury was charged with deciding which cartoons in the tapestry manufactories were sufficiently republican for continued use. On the level of content, the Don Quixote tapestries were approved; however, they were eventually rejected for being too dark.

=== Don Quixote in popular culture ===
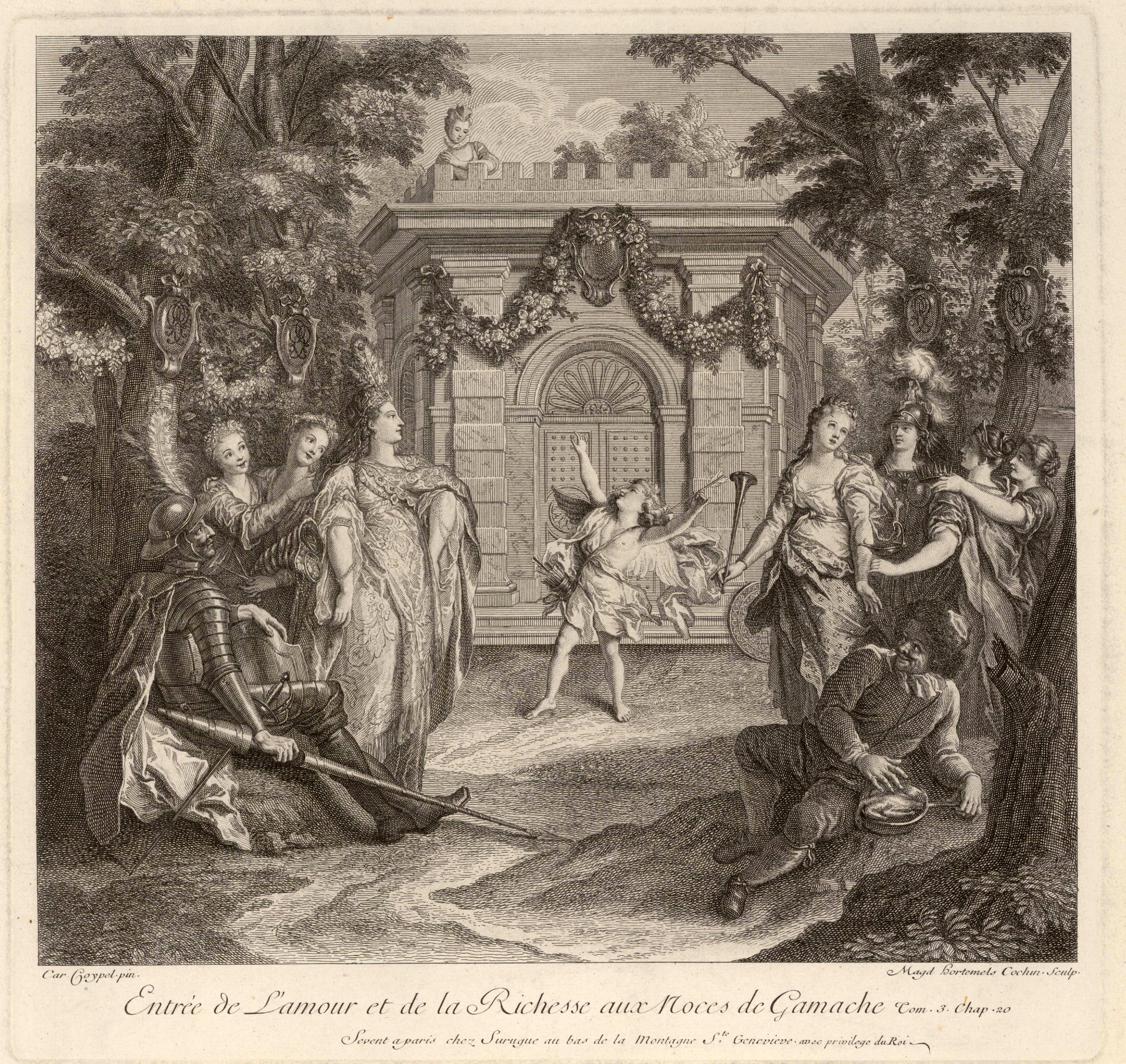
Entrée de l'Amour et de la Richesse aux noces de Gamache after Charles Coypel. Pieter Tanje. 1745. The Metropolitan Museum of Art.

Originally published in 1605, Miguel de Cervantes’s Don Quixote is considered the first modern novel and one of the most popular books of all time. It was extremely popular in France and across Europe during the 18th century, frequented transformed into art and theater. Coypel himself wrote two plays based on the novel, illustrating the significance of the work for the artist.

Coypel's Don Quixote paintings became very popular and came to dominate 18th-century illustrations of the novel. They gained renown through a series of black and white engravings he personally had made of them in collaboration with distinguished print makers of the time. Though the weavings themselves were not accessible to the public, the prints of the paintings were widely reproduced and came to illustrate French, English and Dutch translations of the work. They were also reproduced in a book of prints in 1746 by Pierre de Hondt and inspired later weavings by the Brussels workshop of Peter van den Hecke.

=== Jacques Neilson workshop ===
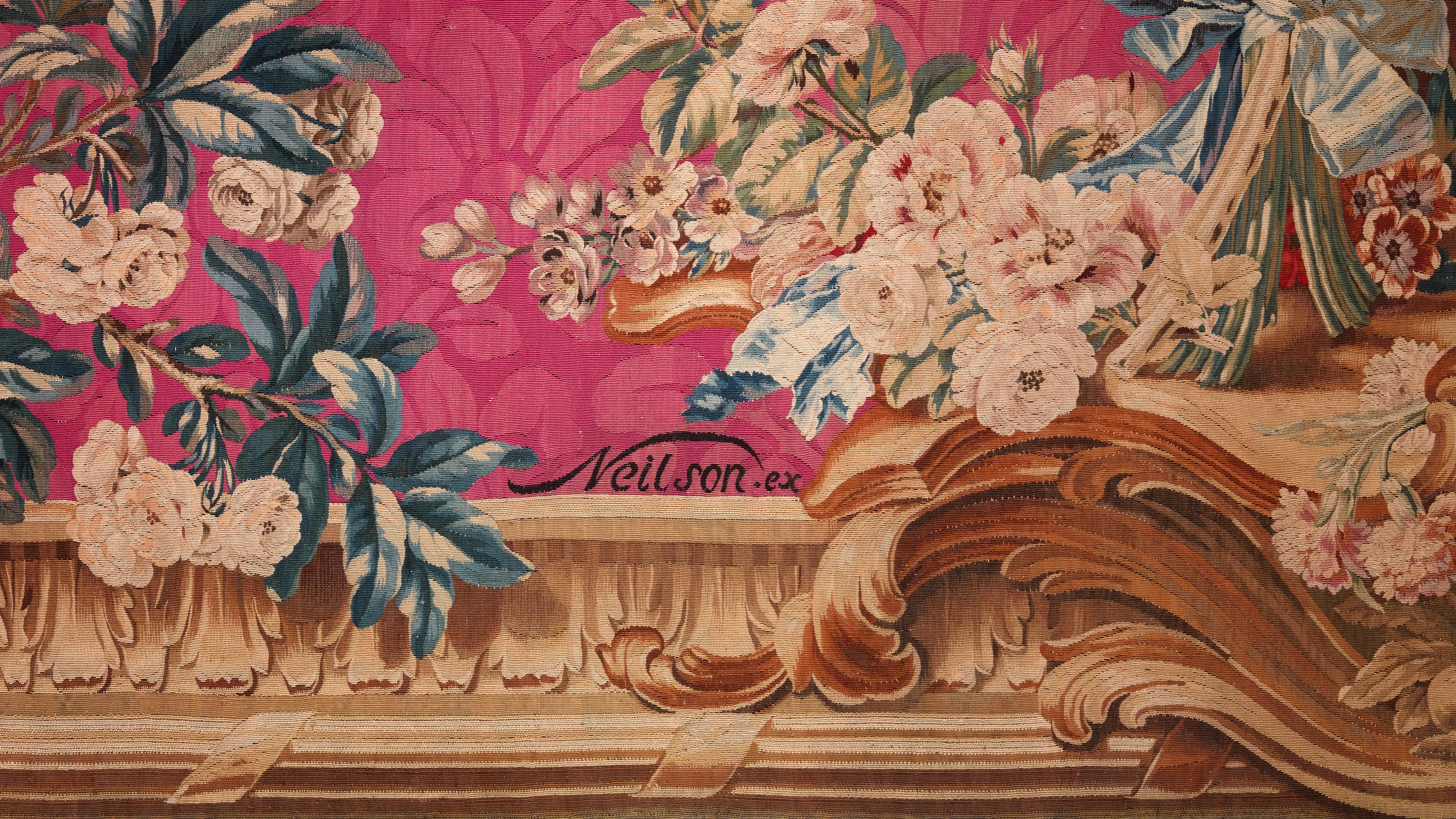
Jacques Neilson workshop signature at the Tapestry Room at the Croome Court. 1763–1771. Metropolitan Museum of Art.

One of the workshops at the Gobelins Manufactory during the 18th century was the low-warp loom (basse-lisse) workshop run by Jacques (James) Neilson, a Scotsman credited with many innovations of the Gobelins Manufactory. Neilson directed the low-warp loom workshop from 1749 to 1788 and was considered the most prominent of workshop directors (entrepreneurs) at the time.

Many technical improvements in the manufactory can be attributed to Neilson. In addition to the workshop, he also directed the dyehouse, bringing an industry expertise that contributed to the exceptional quality of workmanship and color of the Gobelins tapestries at the time. Under his direction, the dyehouse produced more consistent dyes with richer, more varied ranges of tone, thus allowing for a more painterly final product. More available dyes meant more subtle gradations of color and more painterly results overall. Ranges of shade were requiring for modeling, and consistency across the year-long projects was also essential. Research to combat issues of color stability and adequate supply was commonplace across the industry.

In 1760 Neilson discovered the formula for the crimson color derived from cochineal red used in the later weavings of the Don Quixote tapestries. These brilliant crimson works would become the most popular of the series. The success of this new crimson led the other ateliers of the manufactory, those of Cozette and Audran, to work in collaboration on another weaving replicating Neilson's crimson version of Don Quixote.

Similar examples of the exceptional quality of work produced in the Neilson workshop include the Tapestry Room at Croome Court in England commissioned by George Coventry, 6th Earl of Coventry. These tapestries were produced at the same time as the Don Quixote series, utilizing similar motifs of the brilliant crimson damask background and repertoire of decorative ornament.

== 18th-century tapestry design ==
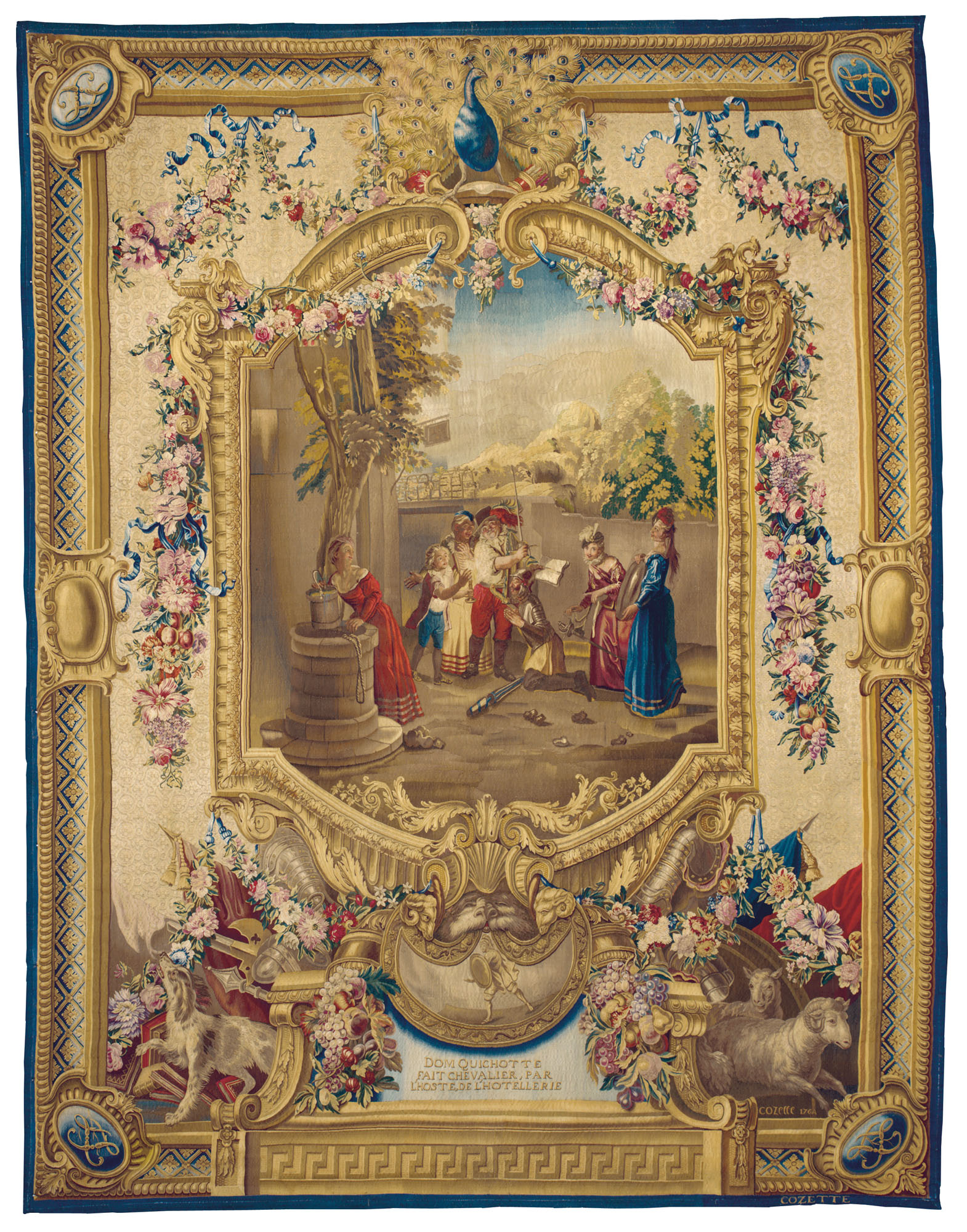
"Don Quixote Made a Knight By the Inn Keeper."

The Don Quixote series bridges a transitional period between the French Baroque of Louis XIV and Charles Le Brun to the Rococo of Louis XV and François Boucher. Interior design reflected these changing tastes from the heavy drama of the Baroque to the airier, more decorative, curvilinear design of the Rococo. The changing decor contributed to more intimate interior spaces, allowing for closer examination of weave and workmanship.

The 18th century saw tapestries become more thoughtful integrated into interior décor, particularly in the chambre de parade of grand houses. These ceremonial bedrooms were designed for receiving visitors in a grandly decorated space. The collaboration of arts succeed creating a harmony in space and while defining it with little intervention.

Similarly, these was a change in opinions about how tapestry colors were used: formerly, weavers had used colors brighter than those of the cartoons in order to assure a longer lifespan for the tapestry's palette. With Jean-Baptiste Oudry as new director of Gobelins, a new attitude emerged for using true colors to create a more painterly product.

=== Alentour tapestries (decorative borders) ===
The distinctive wide, decorative border of this tapestry series is known as an alentour. These could be modified to a specific commission or a patron's wishes while leaving a small but forceful central image (so as to compete with the border) untouched. This allowed for greater flexibility in design and modifications for specific sizes in order to fit different interior spaces. Motifs and ornament in the space could be updated according to tastes au courant. The alentours on the Don Quixote series were refashioned six times during the 18th century, giving it the flexibility to stay relevant with changing technologies and tastes.

The alentours decoration often supplanted the central scenes in importance, as demonstrated by the alentour designers being paid significantly more: Coypel received 200 livres for his cartoon painting, while Claude Audran III received 1,200 for his flower contributions.

The alentours were designed to be lengthened or shortened according to the desired length of the commission, tailoring them to the available wall spaces if possible. This adaptability impacted the way tapestries could fill an interior space. Tapestries to become architectural spaces of their own right, with trompe l’oeil frames hanging on a woven background of sumptuous fabric and decoration with many fantasy elements.

Alentour design began initially with the earlier Gobelin series Portiere des Dieux, with a single figure depicted in the center of the tapestry instead of a narrative scene. Coypel's Don Quixote series would build upon this by separating the central scene even further with a trompe l’oeil gilt frame.

== Designers ==
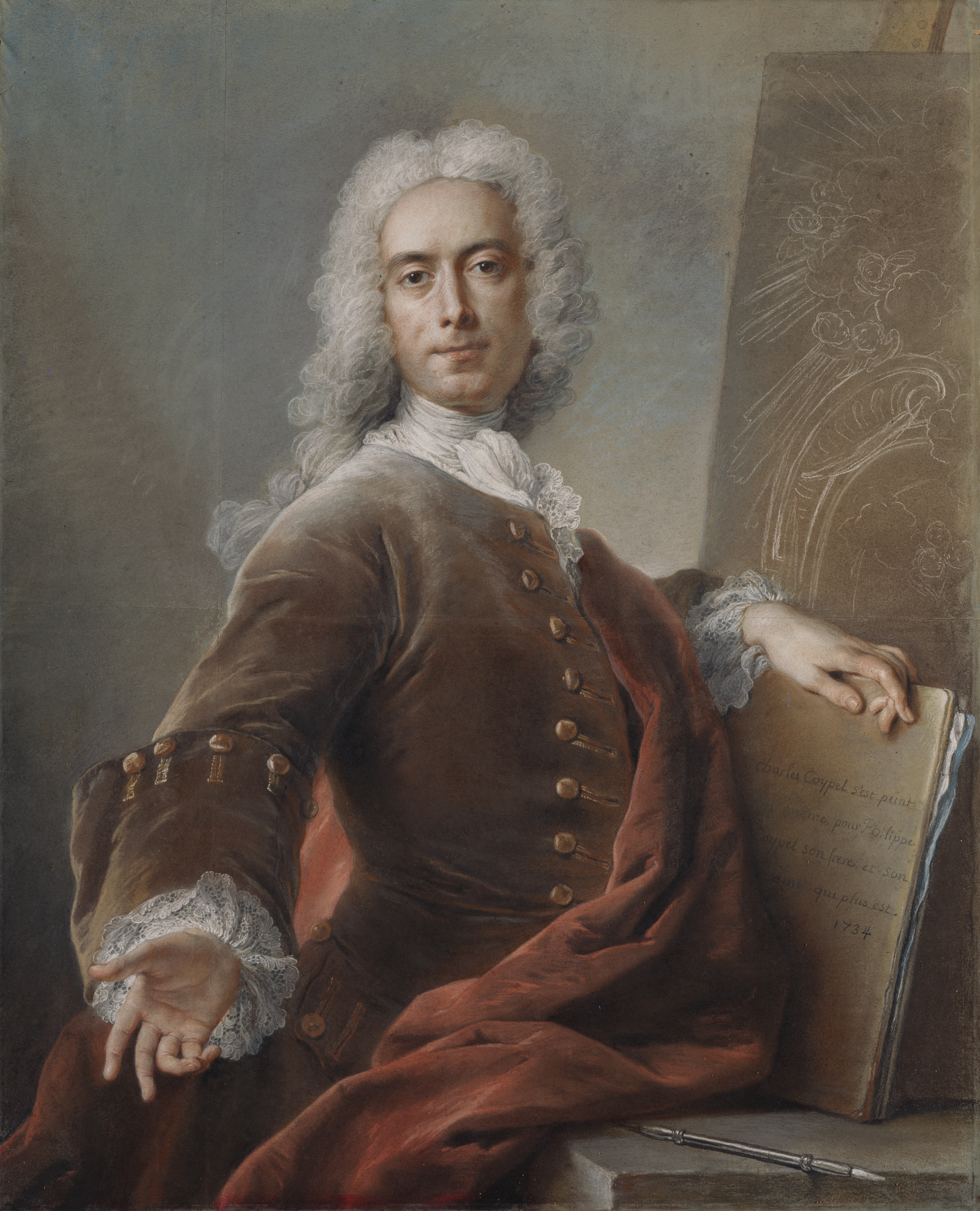
Charles-Antoine Coypel. Self-Portrait, 1734.

=== Charles-Antoine Coypel (1694–1752) ===
Charles-Antoine Coypel was the son of Antoine Coypel, the chief painter to Louis XIV in 1716, and grandson of painter Noel Coypel.

Coypel himself followed in his family's footsteps and became a prominent artist in the 18th century, most significantly through his tapestry cartoons for the Gobelins factory. Overall, Coypel's painting bridges a transitional moment in art and design with the departure from the Baroque of Charles Le Brun through the Rococo of the Antoine Watteau and François Boucher to the Neoclassical reaction of Jacques-Louis David.

Coypel joined the Académie royale de peinture et de sculpture in 1715 and became painter to Philippe II, Duke of Orléans in 1722 during the Régence. He later would become chief painter (Premier peintre du Roi) to Louis XVI in 1747. In 1716 he received his first major commission, the series of cartoons for the Don Quixote tapestries to be made at the Gobelins Manufactory.

Coypel's painting was greatly influenced by the work of Rococo painter Antoine Watteau. Similar to his work, Coypel's paintings demonstrate a very theatrical quality with figures arranged in a stage-like composition. This theatricality would continue to develop throughout his career, most likely stemming from Coypel's secondary passion and unsuccessful pursuit as a playwright.

Coypel's images of Don Quixote were very popular and would be reproduced throughout Europe, inspiring other artists and tapestries as well.

Throughout his development of the cartoons for the Don Quixote series, Coypel strengthened his composition by bringing depth and dynamism through breaking apart the grouping and emphasizing prominent figures through his arrangement of architectural elements and drapery.

=== Claude Audran III (1658–1734) ===
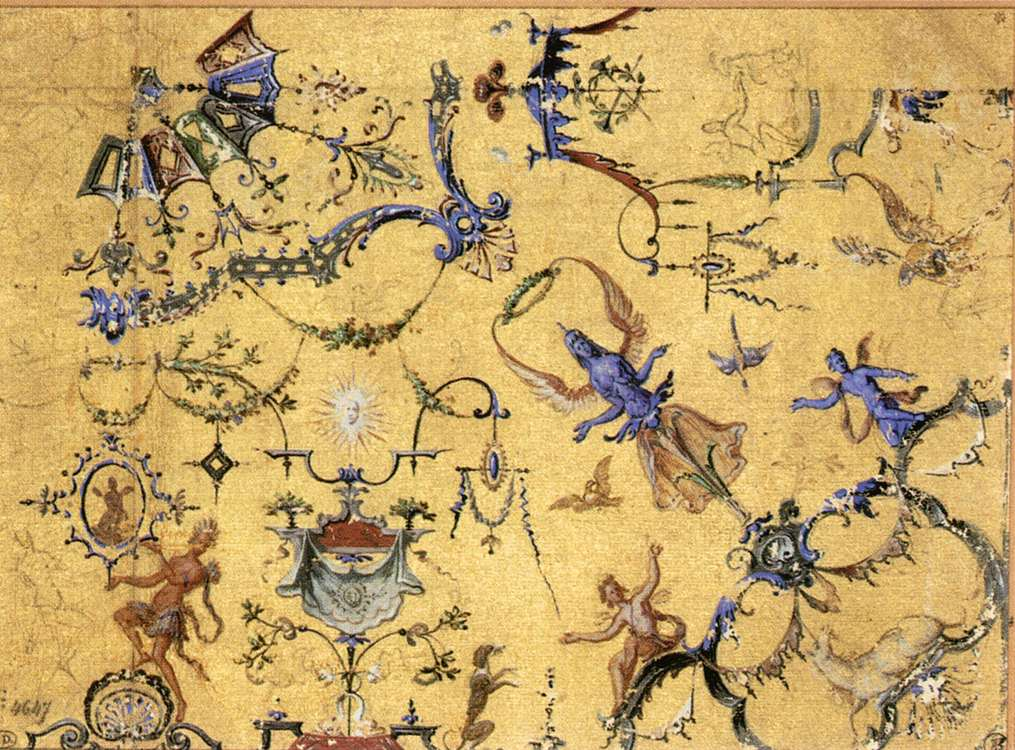
Claude Audran III, Arabesque ceiling decoration.

Claude Audran III designed much of the decoration on the tapestries’ alentours. A leading ornamental painter, he produced ornamental painting and decoration in the arabesque style during Louis XIV's reign. He painted a variety of interiors, including walls and ceilings, and designed arabesque patterns for use in all manner of use, ranging from textile work to stained glass. He worked extensively as a decorative painter at Versailles and Fontainebleau for the court and began work as a designer at the Gobelins Manufactory when it reopened in 1699.

He was most noted for his arabesque and singerie decorations, both visible in the Don Quixote series. The singerie motif for which he was so well known consisted of monkeys dressed in human clothing behaving as humans. This design was highly influential for other artists of the day.

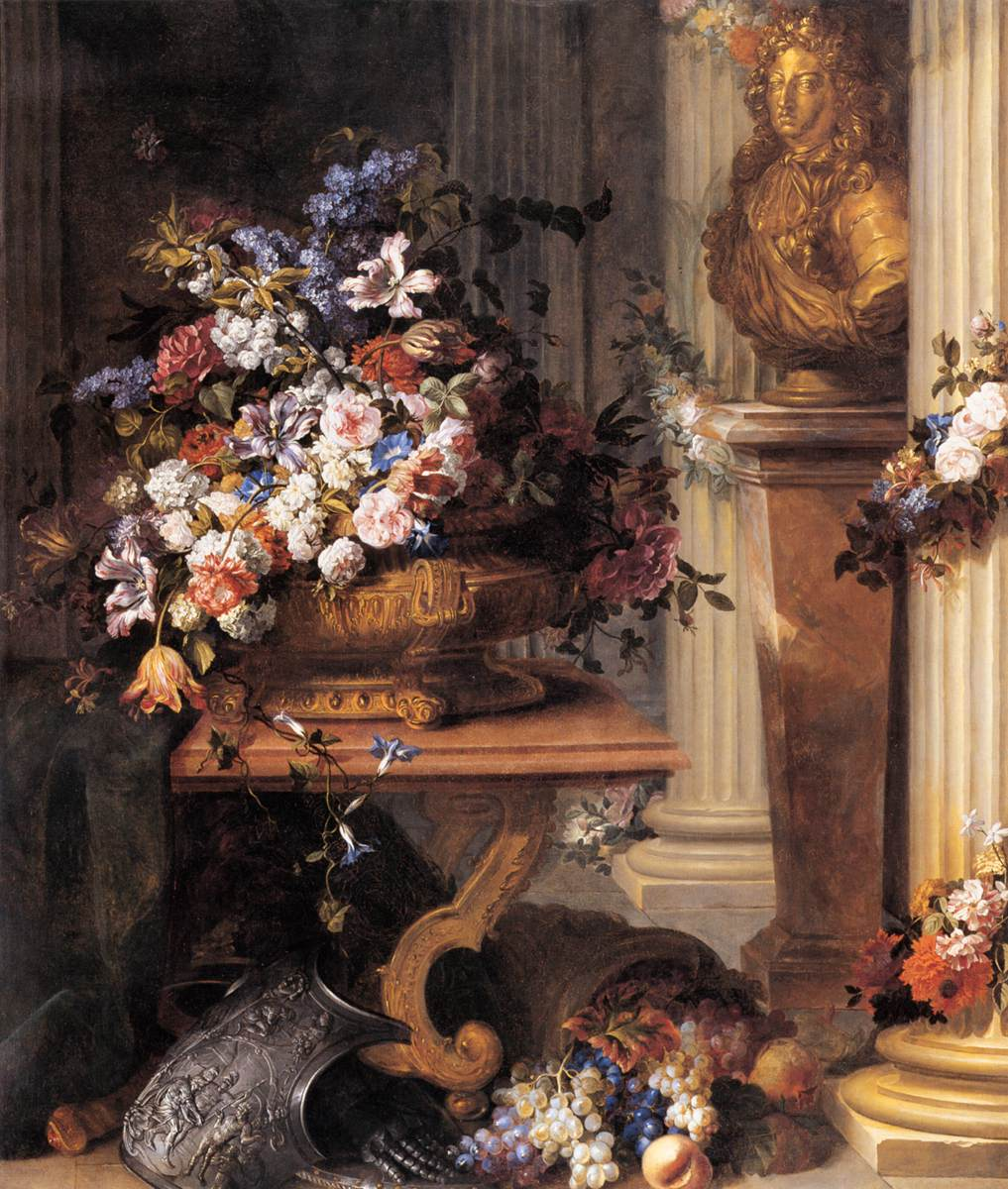
Flowers in a Gold Vase, Bust of Louis XIV, Horn of Plenty and Armour. Jean-Baptiste Belin de Fontenay the Elder. 1687.

=== Jean-Baptiste Belin de Fontenay the Elder (1653–1715) ===
Jean-Baptiste Belin de Fontenay was a prominent French flower painter and a longtime designer at the Gobelins Manufactory. He frequently worked in collaboration with other artists to complete exquisite flower borders. Similar to Claude Audran III, Belin painted decorative flowers and ornament at several royal châteaux, including Fontainebleau and Versailles.

=== Design motifs ===
The central Coypel picture is framed in an ornate gilt frame surrounded by extravagant swags of flowers, fruits, and ribbons that hang on a wall of crimson damask. The garlands also house a plethora of fantastic animals; birds of all sizes, monkeys. Each corner bears a cartouche, and some versions bear the monogram of the king in swirling 'L's. The central frame sits above a pile of armor, standards, and banners with an inscription indicating the title of the scene depicted.

Early versions of the series have a medallion at the center top of each tapestry with an inscribed bust of a paladin, presumably referencing different heroes of Don Quixote from his romance novels (Amadis, Roland, Palmerin d'Olive).

In some later editions, the paladin busts are moved to either side of the frame, their former place above the frame filled with two children presumably painted by Coypel.

Stacks of books in the pile are included in later weavings as well, presumably referencing the knightly romances that drove Don Quixote mad, as well as sheep to reference the flock that Don Quixote mistook for an army.

In later weavings, more elaborate fowl appear, intertwined with even more garlands of flowers. A peacock framed in feathers appears on top, along with monkeys on the sides. As the specifications of the commissions changed, so did the quantity of ornamentation and decoration in order to reflect the desired taste of the commissioner.

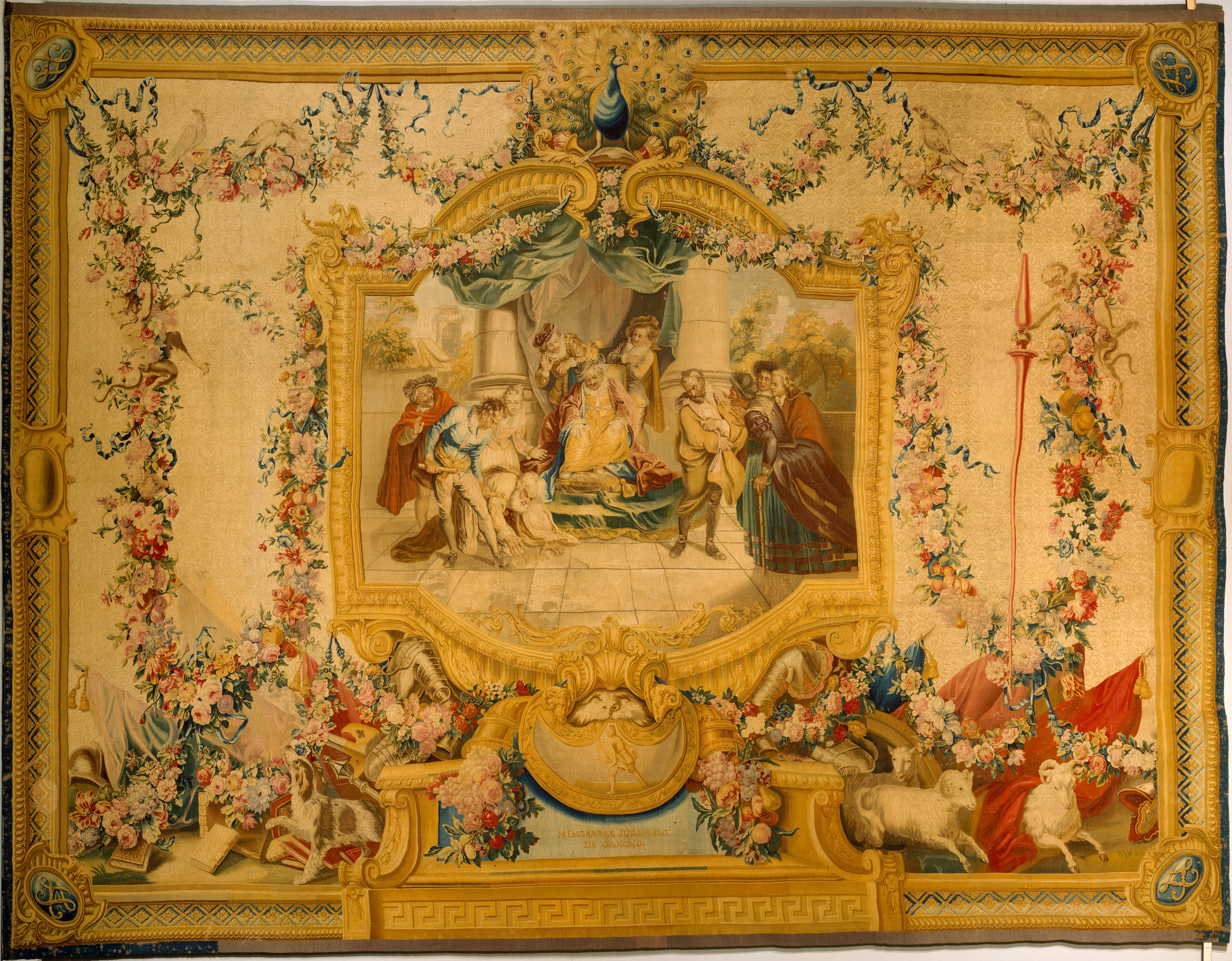
The Memorable Judgement of Sancho Panza

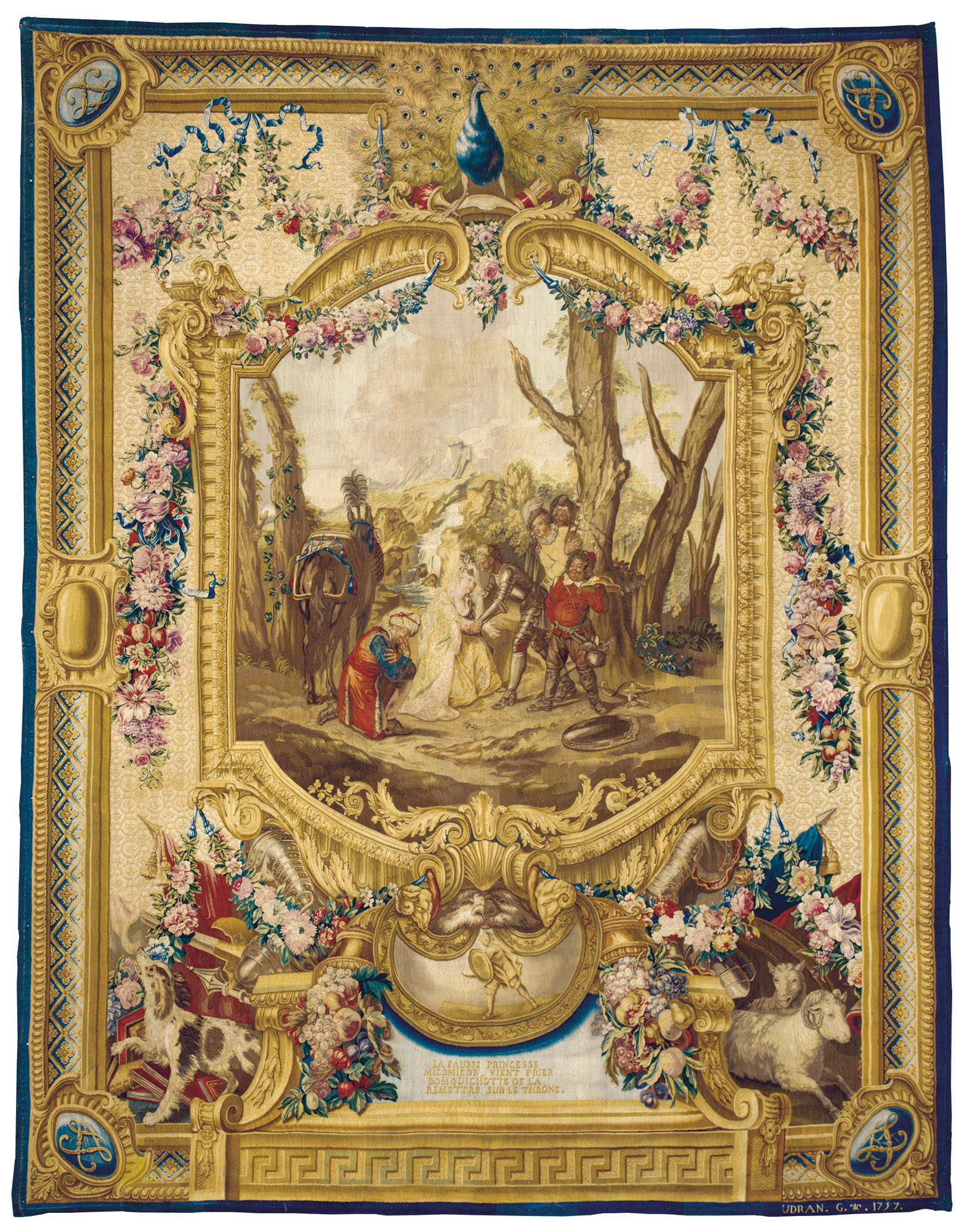
The False Princess Micomicon Imploring Don Quixote

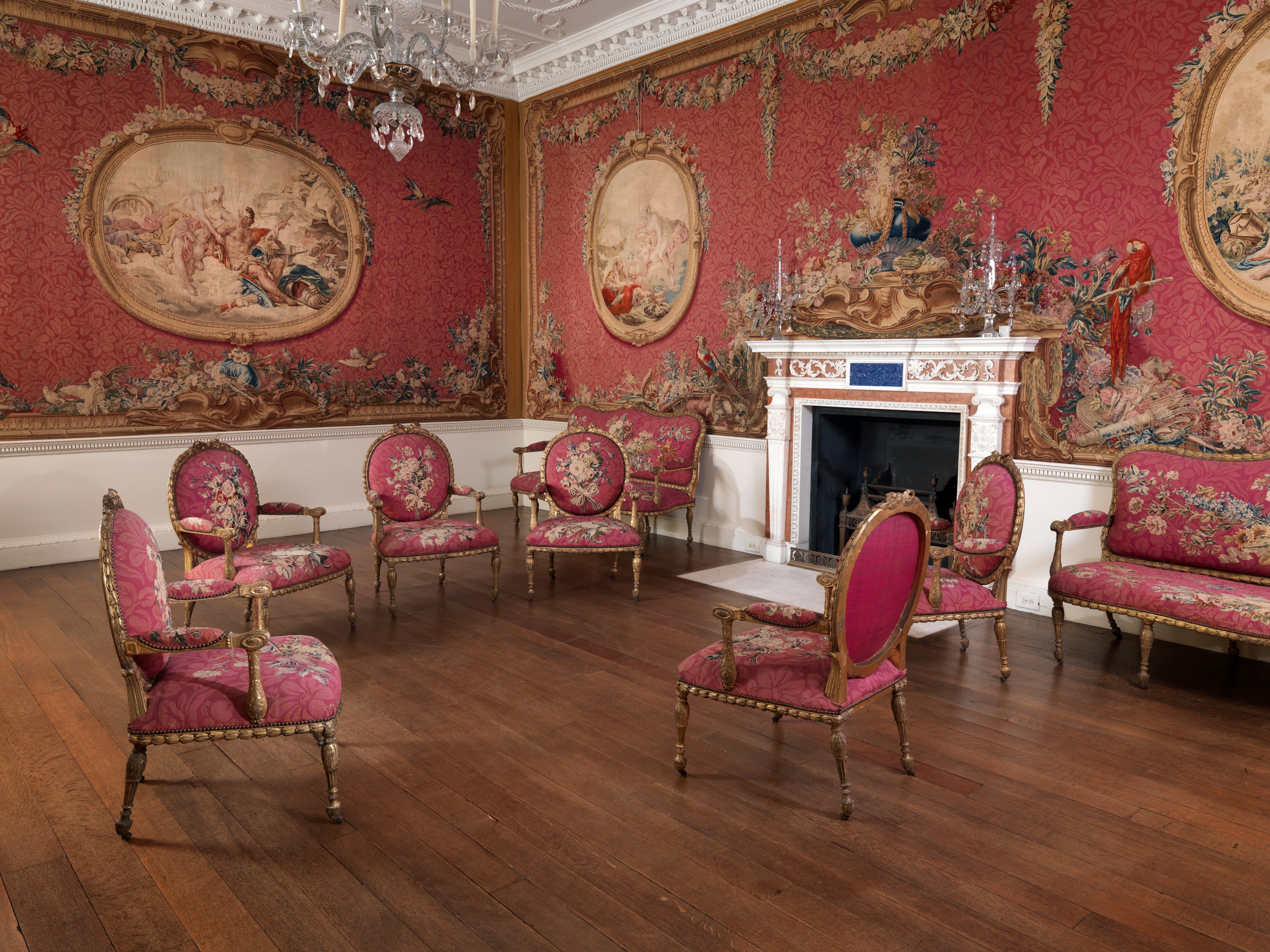
The Tapestry Room from Croome Court
