= François Hutin =

French painter, sculptor and engraver (1686–1758)

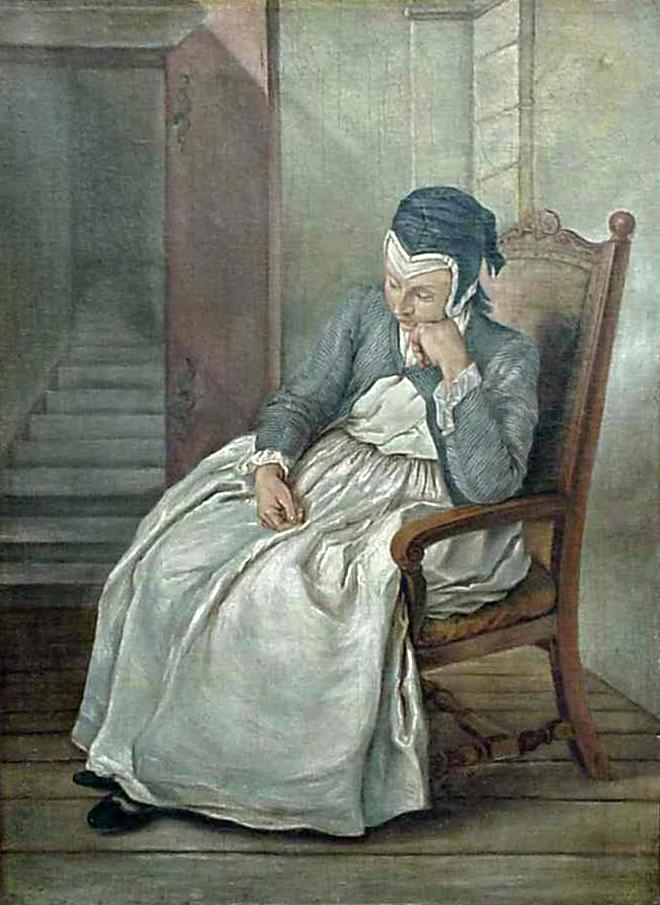
François Hutin's 'Woman in an armchair', National Museum, Warsaw, 1750s

François Hutin (1686 – August 1758) was a French painter, sculptor and engraver.

== Life ==
Hutin was born in Paris. He studied under Bon Boullogne, and as a student submitted his work in the competitions of the Royal Academy of Painting and Sculpture in 1709 and 1710. Hutin married painter Anne-Auguste Hérault, the daughter of the famous painter Charles-Antoine Hérault (1644–1718). This matrimonial tie made Hutin a member of a renowned artistic clan, much like the famous families of Coypel and Roëttiers. They had three sons, all of whom later became artists: Charles, Pierre-Jules, who worked in Dresden, and Jean-Baptiste.

While in Paris both Hutin and his wife were members of the Académie de Saint-Luc. In 1737 Hutin and his family moved to Rome. He was entrusted with decorations for the Chinea festival, a yearly tribute offered to the Pope as ultimate sovereign of Naples. He also produced a number of sculptures during his stay there. The family eventually returned to Paris where Hutin died in August 1758.
