= Marie-Geneviève Hérault =

French artist (c. 1655 – c. 1712)

Marie-Geneviève Hérault (born Marie-Geneviève de Lens, sometimes de Lance) (c. 1655 – c. 1712) was a French painter.

Born in Paris, Hérault was married to painter Charles-Antoine Hérault; their daughter, whom they both taught, was the painter Marie-Catherine Silvestre. She has been described as excelling in the arts of pastel and miniature painting.
