= Coypel =

Coypel is the name of a French family of painters, including:

- Noël Coypel 1628–1707,
- Antoine Coypel, 1661–1722, son of Noël
- Charles-Antoine Coypel 1694–1752, son of Antoine
- Noël Nicholas Coypel 1690–1734, son of Noël and half-brother of Antoine
