= Charles-Antoine Hérault =

French painter (1644–1718)

Charles-Antoine Hérault (1 January 1644 - 19 July 1718) was a French landscape painter. He was often known as Charles Hérault. His wife Marie-Geneviève and their daughter Marie-Catherine were also painters, as were his sister Madeleine's husband Noël Coypel and his daughter Anne-Auguste's husband François Hutin.

== Life ==
Born in Paris, he was the son of Antoine Hérault (c. 1600-c. 1655), another painter, and Madeleine Bruyant (c. 1610–1676), sister of Françoise Bruyant, wife of Charles Poerson. Antoine Hérault was known for Hiérosme Bachot's engraving after his portrait of cardinal de Bérulle, made from life and nicknamed the portrait of cardinal de Bérulle "à face de grenouille" (with a frog-face). Bachot was son-in-law of Charles Errard the Elder (1570-before January 1630) and brother-in-law of Charles Errard. Antoine Hérault was sworn in to Paris's community of master painters and sculptors and as such in 1651 he signed the contract which joined that community with the Académie royale de peinture et de sculpture.

He initially studied painting under his father, then with a landscape painter whose name is unknown. He then went to Rome to study paintings by Guaspre Poussin and Salvator Rosa. Charles-Antoine Hérault was received into the Académie royale de peinture et de sculpture in 1670.

== General references ==
- Jal, Auguste (1872). "Herault (Les)". Dictionnaire critique de biographie et d'histoire : errata et supplément pour tous les dictionnaires historiques (in French). pp. 678–679.
- Guiffrey, Jules (1884). "LI-Charles Hérault, peintre ordinaire du roi et de son Académie. 19 juillet 1718". Scellés et inventaires d'artistes du XVIIe et du XVIIIe siècle (in French). Paris: Charavay frères. pp. 260–261.
- Bellier de La Chavignerie, Émile; Auvray, Louis (1882–1885). "Hérault (Charles-Antoine)". Dictionnaire général des artistes de l'École française depuis l'origine des arts du dessin jusqu'à nos jours : architectes, peintres, sculpteurs, graveurs et lithographes (in French).
