= Louis de Silvestre =

French painter (1675–1760)

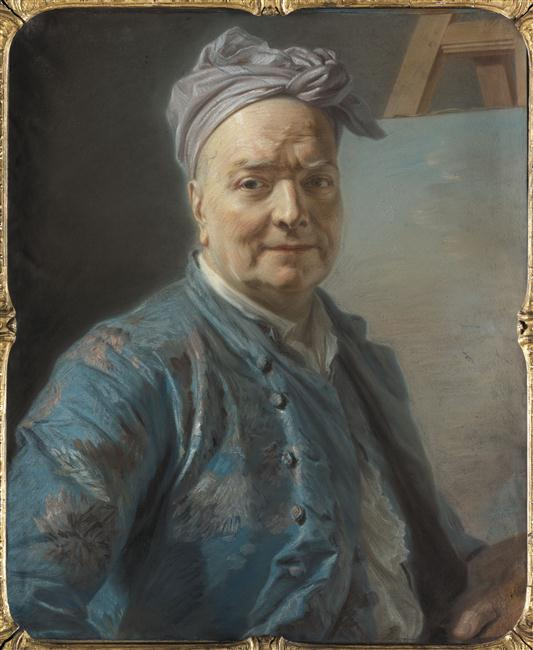
- Portrait of Silvestre from 1753 by Académie member Maurice Quentin de La Tour
- Born: 23 June 1675; Sceaux or Paris, Kingdom of France
- Died: April 11, 1760 (aged 84); Paris, Kingdom of France
- Spouse: Marie-Catherine Silvestre
- Children: Marie-Maximilienne de Silvestre
- Parents: Israel Silvestre (father); Henriette Sélincart (mother)

Director of the Académie Royale de Peinture et de Sculpture
- In office 1752–1760
- Monarch: Louis XV
- Preceded by: Charles-Antoine Coypel
- Succeeded by: Jean Restout

Louis de Silvestre (23 June 1675 - 11 April 1760), also known as Louis de Silvestre the Younger, was a French portrait and history painter. He was court painter to King Augustus II of Poland, and director of the Royal Academy of Arts in Dresden. He is sometimes called "the Younger" to distinguish him from his older brother Louis Silvestre the Elder, drawing-master to the Dauphin.

== Life and work ==
Silvestre was born in either Paris or Sceaux, a town south of Paris, on 23 June 1675. He was the fourth son of draughtsman and engraver Israel Silvestre and Henriette Sélincart, the daughter of a Parisian merchant. His father was a prolific sketch artist, becoming Graveur Ordinaire du Roi (King's Engraver) as well drawing-master to Louis, Grand Dauphin, before Silvestre's birth.

Silvestre was initially taught by his father, then trained under the painters Charles Le Brun and Bon Boullogne. In 1701, he left for Rome where he trained with the Italian painter Carlo Maratta.

After his return to Paris, Sylvester entered the Académie de peinture et de sculpture in 1702 and was appointed professor in 1706. The main works he painted at this time were The Healing of the paralytic at the door of the Temple (1703) and the portrait of Louis XV (1715).

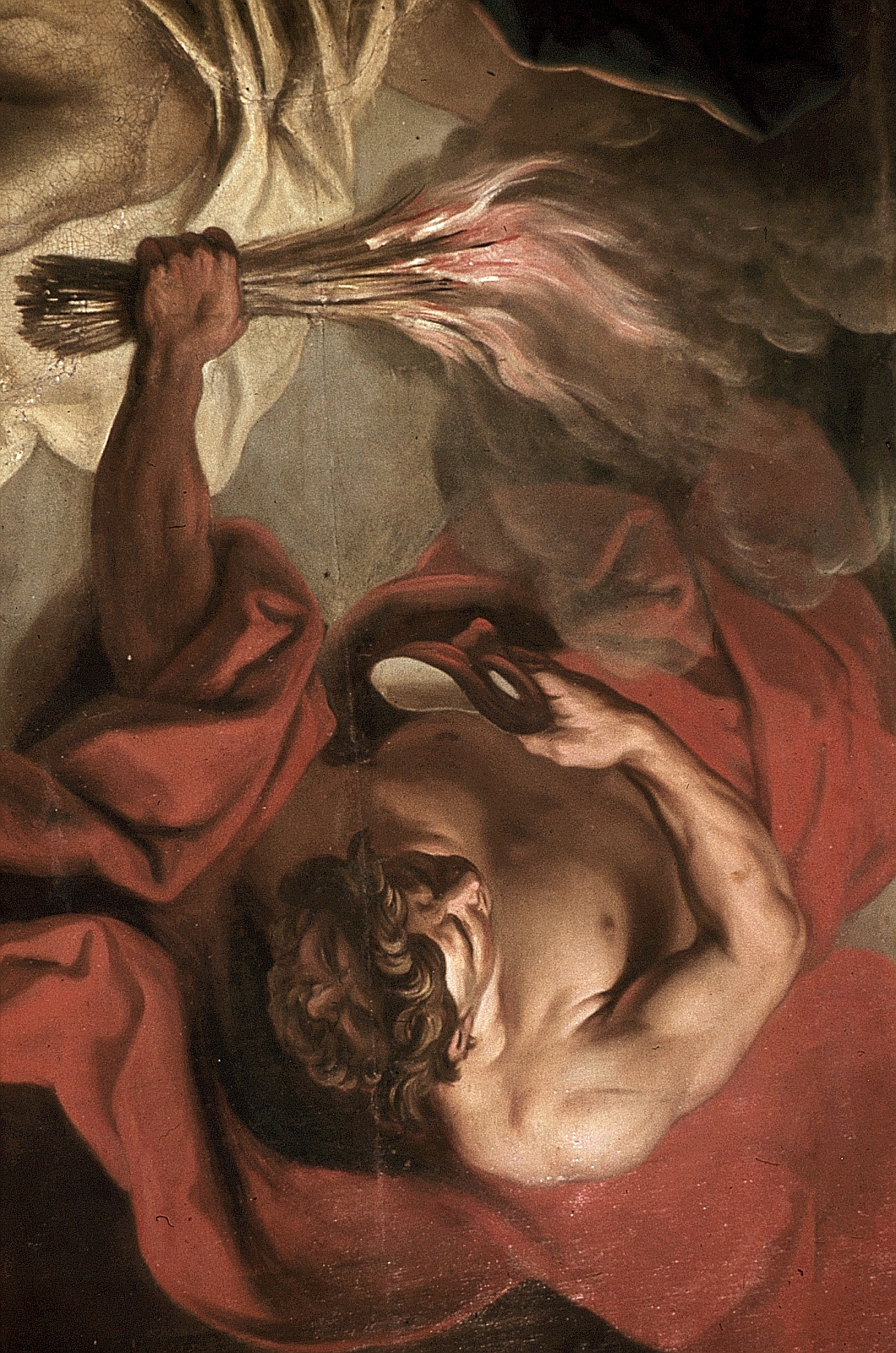
Hercules topples discord, envy and hatred

Friedrich August II, the prince-elector of Saxony, met Silvestre when he was in France and offered him the chance to work at the court of his father Augustus II, King of Poland. The artist accepted the offer, obtained permission from Louis XV, and set off on April 23, 1716; by 1718 he was living in Dresden. Both Augustus II and his son were great admirers of Silvestre's work, and bestowed upon him, in the space of thirty years, every honour imaginable: he was appointed first court painter, then, in 1727, director of the Royal Academy of Arts; he was ennobled in 1741, as was his brother Charles-François.

During this period, Silvestre completed, with the help of his wife, Marie-Catherine Hérault, many oil paintings and frescos, either in Dresden or in Warsaw. He painted many portraits of the King and Queen, as well as those of other leading aristocrats. He was responsible for the most important works in the Palace of Dresden, notably, subjects drawn from Ovid's Metamorphoses for several ceremonial bedrooms and several ceilings. On the death of Heinrich Christian Fehling (1654–1725), Silvestre was made Director of the Art Academy in Dresden.

During the time he remained at the court of Dresden, Silvestre was known as much for his personality and his distinguished friends, as by his artistic talents. The great number of works that came from his brush and the generosity of his patrons allowed him to amass a considerable fortune, and, having achieved financial security, he retired and returned to France. Louis XV awarded him a pension of 1000 crowns and apartments in the Palais du Louvre itself. Silvestre was elected Director of the Académie Royale de Peinture et de Sculpture in Paris in 1752, an office he held until his death.

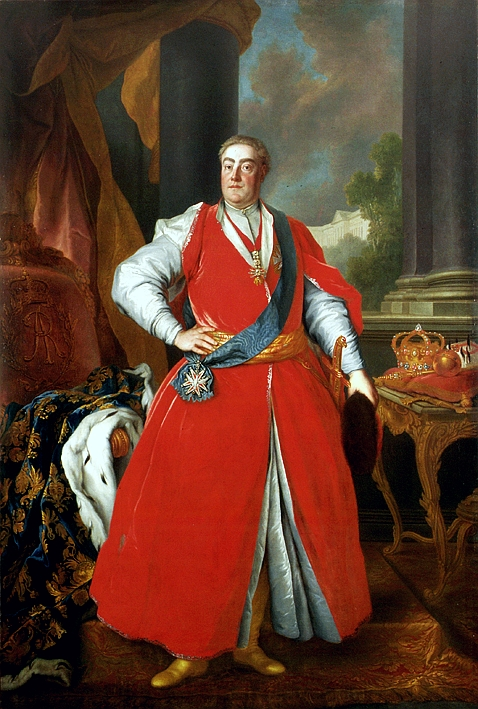
Portrait of King Augustus III of Poland, 1737

Louis de Silvestre died in Paris at the Palais du Louvre on 11 April 1760.

"As for art", says Mariette, "he was not a painter without merit, but his style had nothing that was new or too exciting; one saw only in him a good follower of Bon Boulogne."

Amongst Silvestre's students was the painter Jean-Eleazar Schenau, who later became director of the Dresden Academy and of the Meissen porcelain factory. His daughter Marie-Maximilienne also became a painter.

== Selected works ==
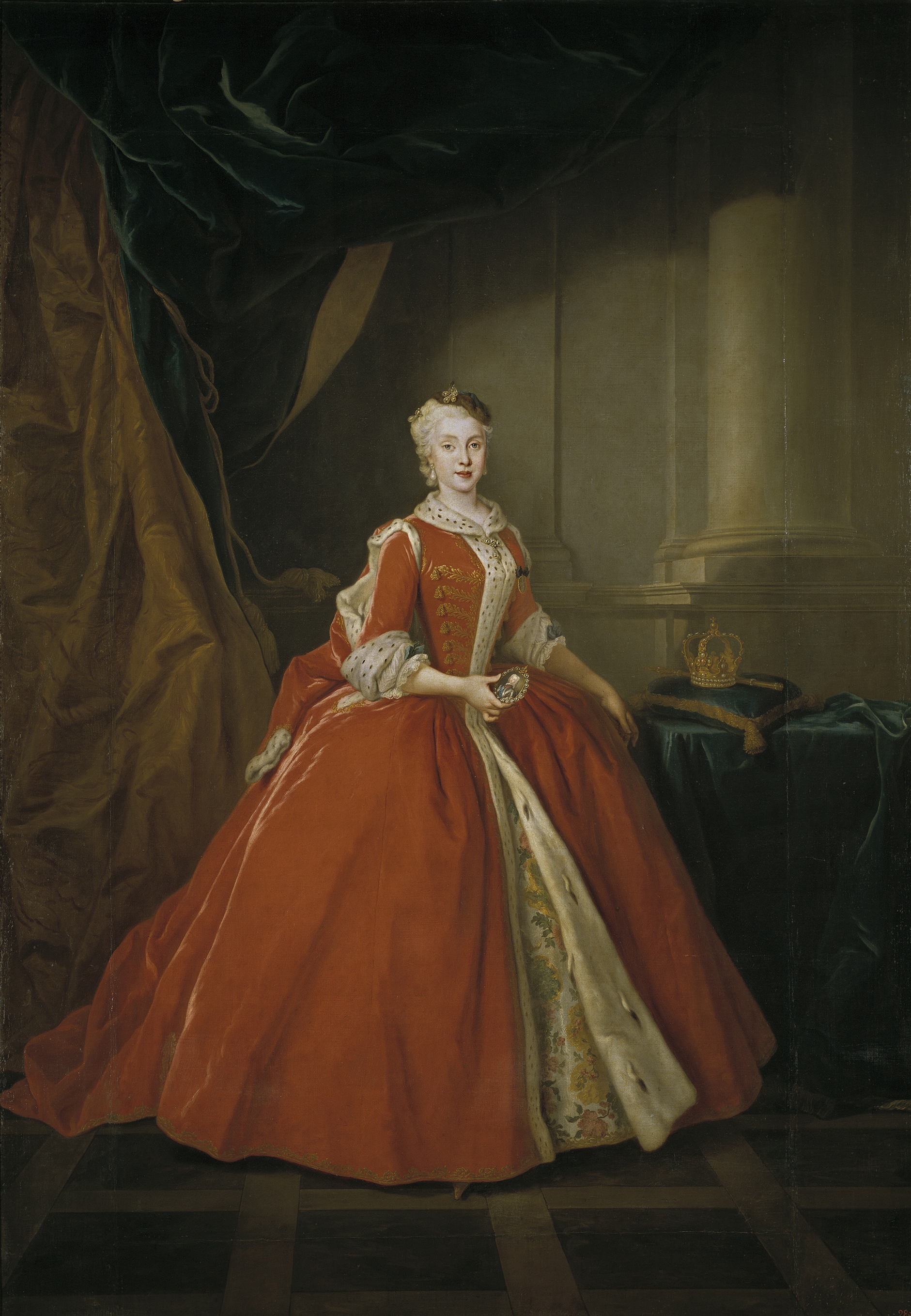
Portrait of the Princess Maria Amalia of Saxony in Polish costume (1738)

- Arion jouant de la lyre, Louvre, Paris;
- La Cène, musée national du château et des Trianons, Versailles Museum;
- La Mort d’Adonis, Musée Magnin, Dijon;
- Louis XIV reçoit à Fontainebleau le prince électeur de Saxe. 27 septembre 1714, Versailles museum;
- Saint Benoit ressuscite un enfant, Louvre, Paris;
- Entrevue de l’impératrice Amélie, veuve de l’empereur Joseph I, avec son gendre Auguste III, roi de Pologne, et sa famille, à Neuhaus, en Bohême, le 24 mai 1737, avec une infinité de portraits de personnages du temps; Large painting, 17 ft 6 ins in height, by 23 ft 9 ins long. Engraved by Francesco Zucchi, Dresden Gallery; another version of the Entrevue de Neuhaus is at the Louvre;
- Portrait de la femme d’Auguste III, en princesse électorale;
- Hercule poursuit Nessus, qui s’enfuit avec Déjanire, Dresden Gallery;
- Auguste II, roi de Pologne, donnant la main à Frédéric-Guillaume I, Dresden Gallery;
- Portrait de Christian V, roi de Danemark, Dresden Gallery;
- Portrait de son frère Georges, mari de la reine Anne, Dresden Gallery;
- Portrait de Georges, fils de la princesse Lubomirska, plus tard princesse de Teschen, appelé le chevalier de Saxe, Dresden Gallery;
- Portrait of the Countess Lubomirska, Dresden State Art Collections.
- Portrait du comte Kosel, fils de la baronne de Hoymb. Gravé par Tardieu, Dresden Gallery;
- Portrait du comte Rudoffsky, général en chef de l’armée saxonne, Dresden Gallery;
- Portrait du général comté Gastelli, Dresden Gallery;
- Portrait d’Antoine Rosdraziewsky, référendaire de la couronne de Pologne, Dresden Gallery;
- Portrait du général comte de Kœnigseck, Dresden Gallery;
- Portrait d’Auguste II, roi de Pologne, Dresden Gallery
- Le même à cheval, Dresden Gallery;
- Portrait d’Auguste III, King of Pologne, Dresden Gallery;
- Portrait d’Auguste III, King of Pologne, Royal Castle, Warsaw;
- Portrait de Marie-Josèphe, Queen-consort of Poland; figure jusqu’aux genoux, Engraved by Schmidt, Von Marrées Gallery, Berlin;
- Un cavalier de la cour d’Auguste II, en masque avec une cornemuse, Von Marrées Gallery, Berlin;
- Allégorie sur l’éducation d’un prince de Saxe, Hermitage Museum, Saint Petersburg;
- Allégorie sur la naissance d’un prince de la maison de Saxe, Hermitage Museum, Saint Petersburge.
- Portrait of the Countess Orzelska, Palace on the Water, Warsaw.

== Gallery ==
Works by Louis de Silvestre

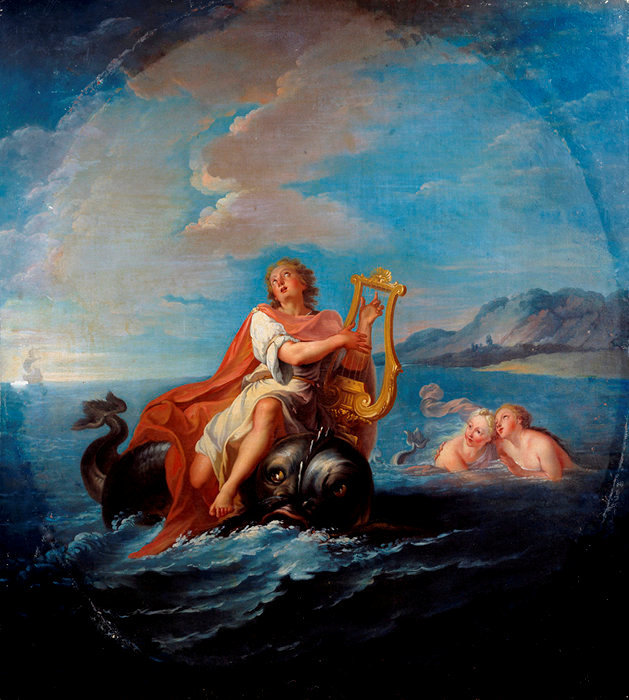
Arion Playing the Lyre (1701)

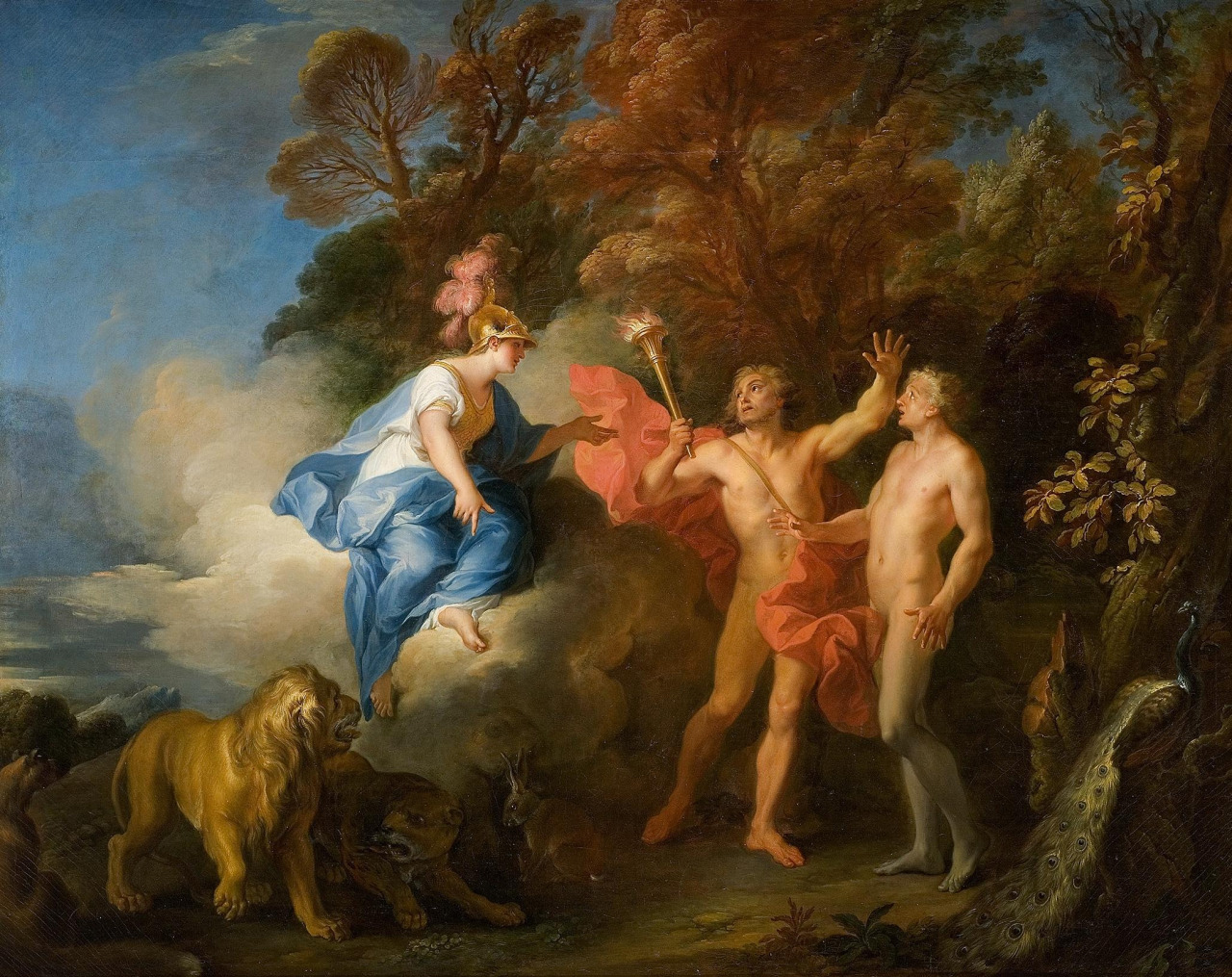
Creation of Man by Prometheus (1702)

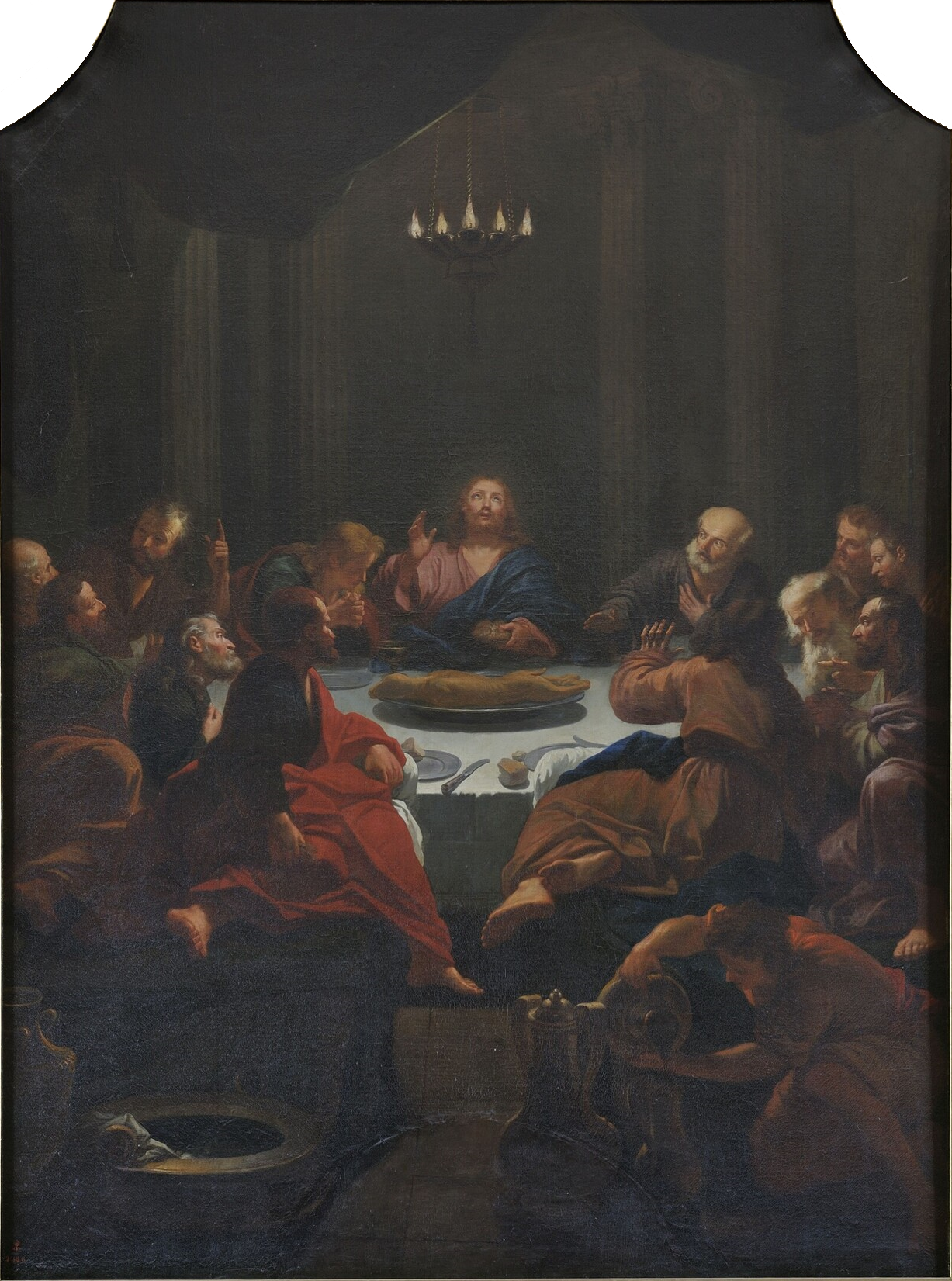
Last Supper (1709–1710)

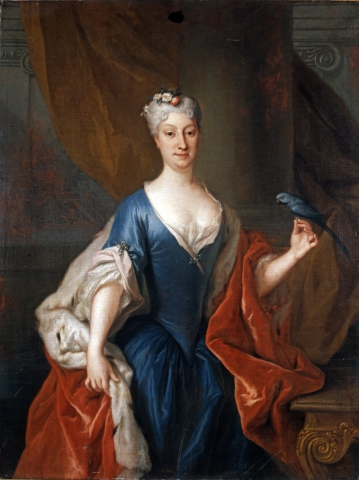
Portrait of Katarzyna Barbara Radziwiłłówna with a parrot (1726)

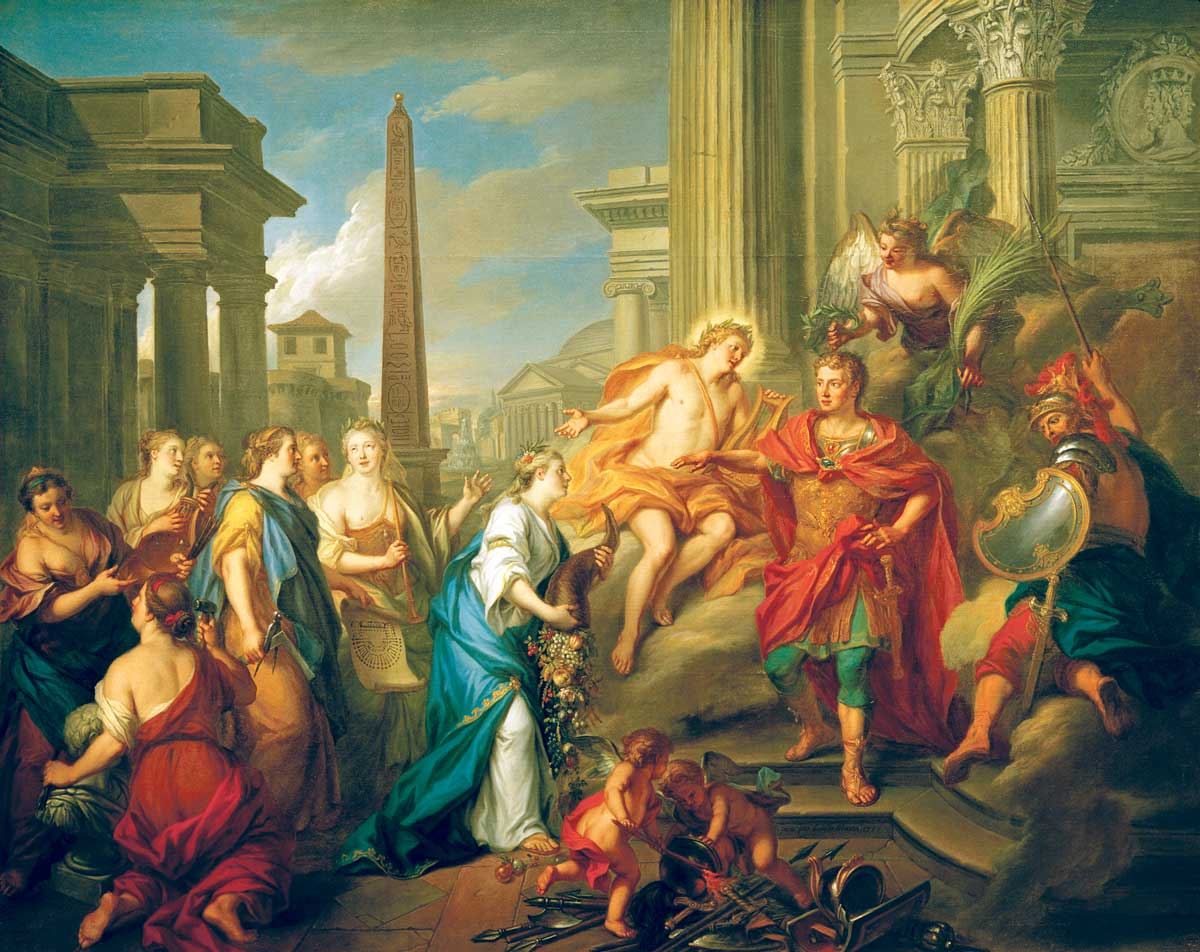
Closing of the Temple of Janus by Augustus (1757)

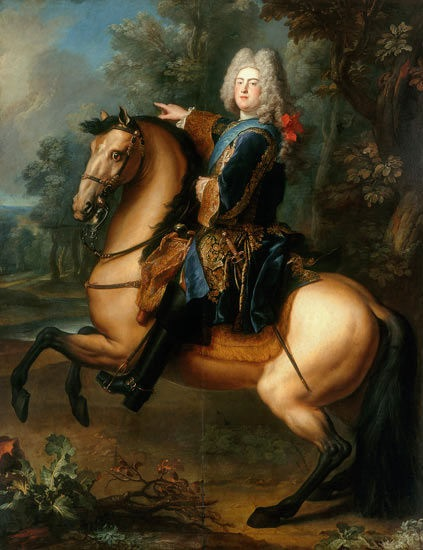
Augustus III of Poland, 1718

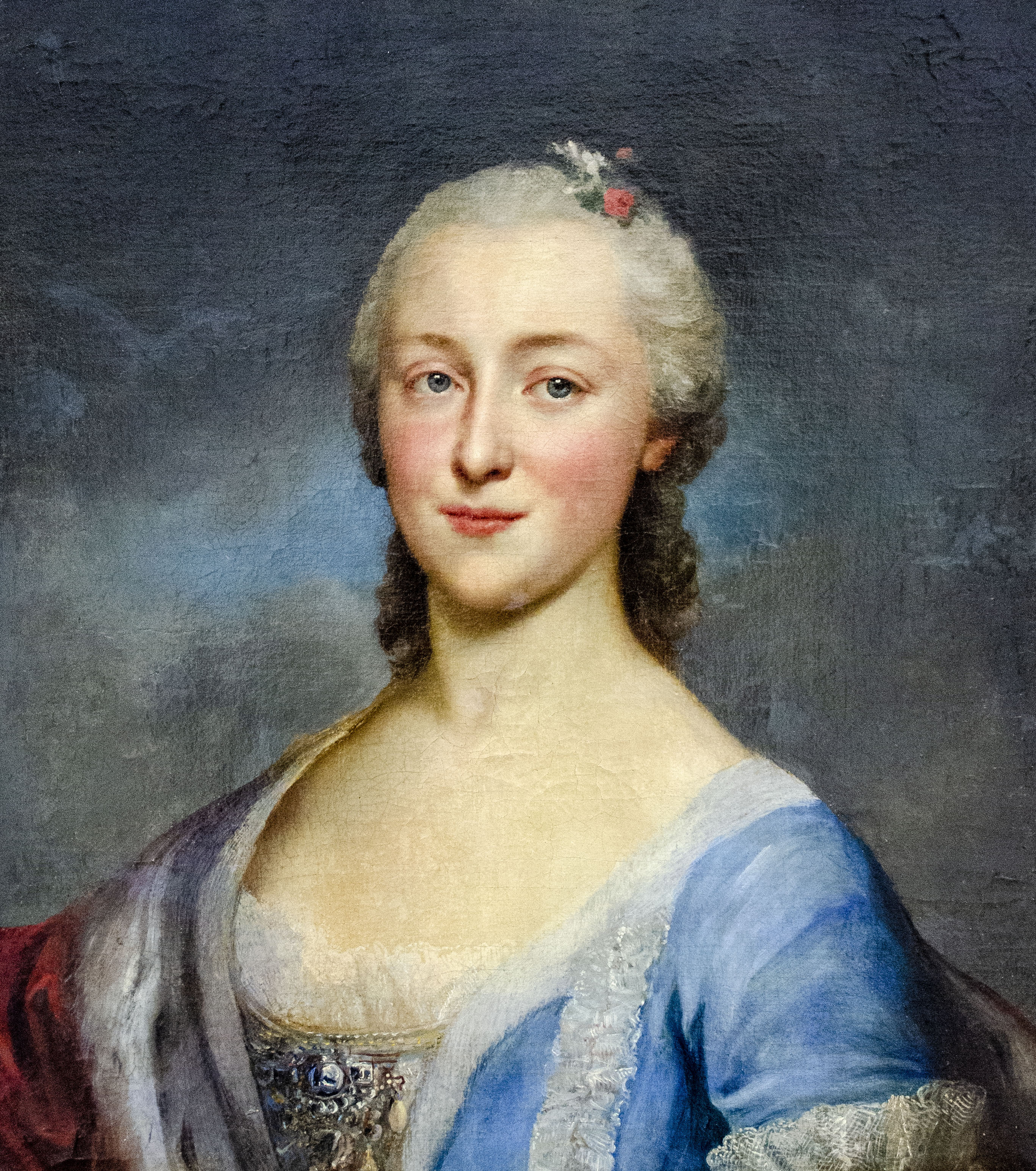
Duchess Maria Antonia of Bavaria, 1747

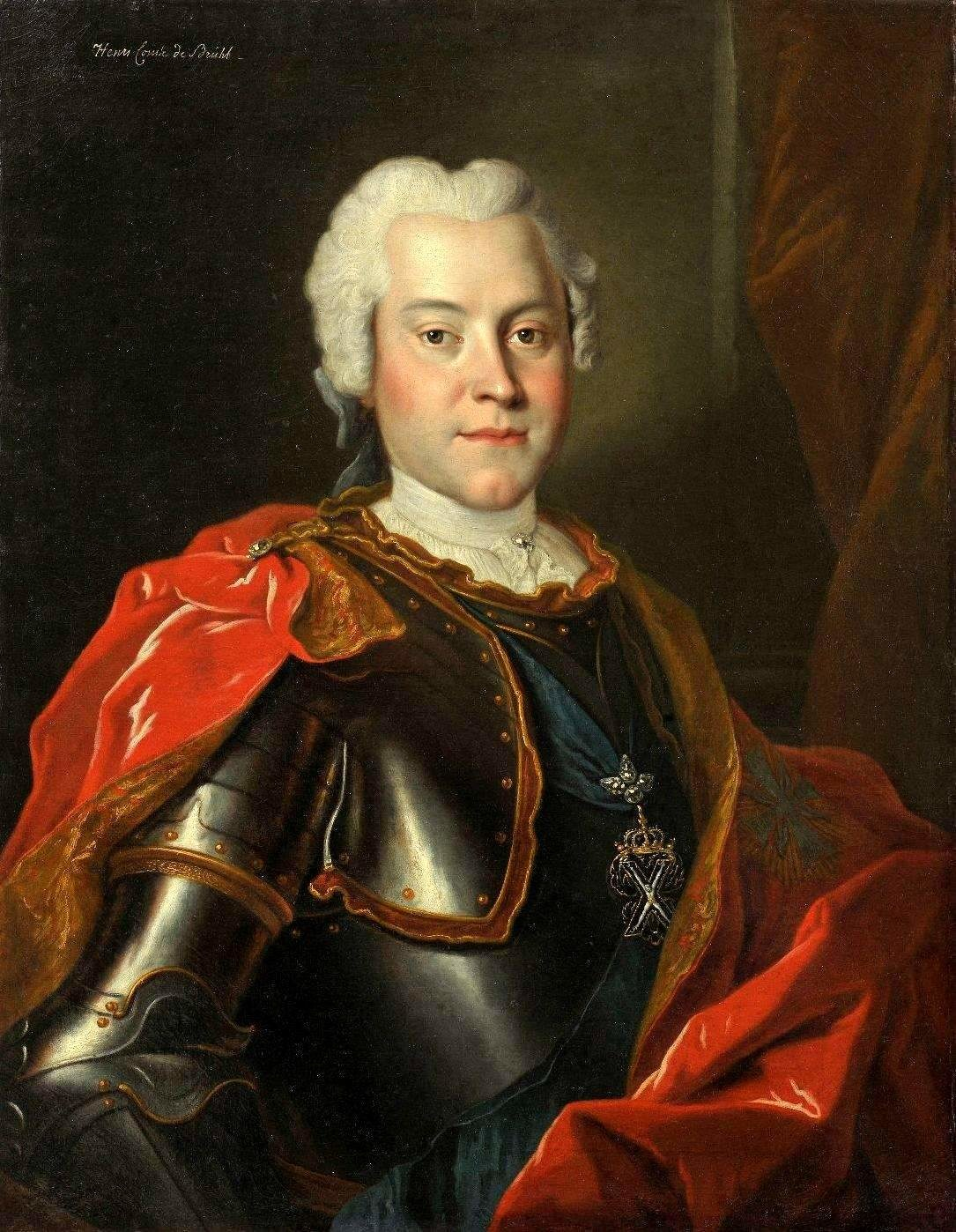
Portrait of Heinrich von Brühl, 1737

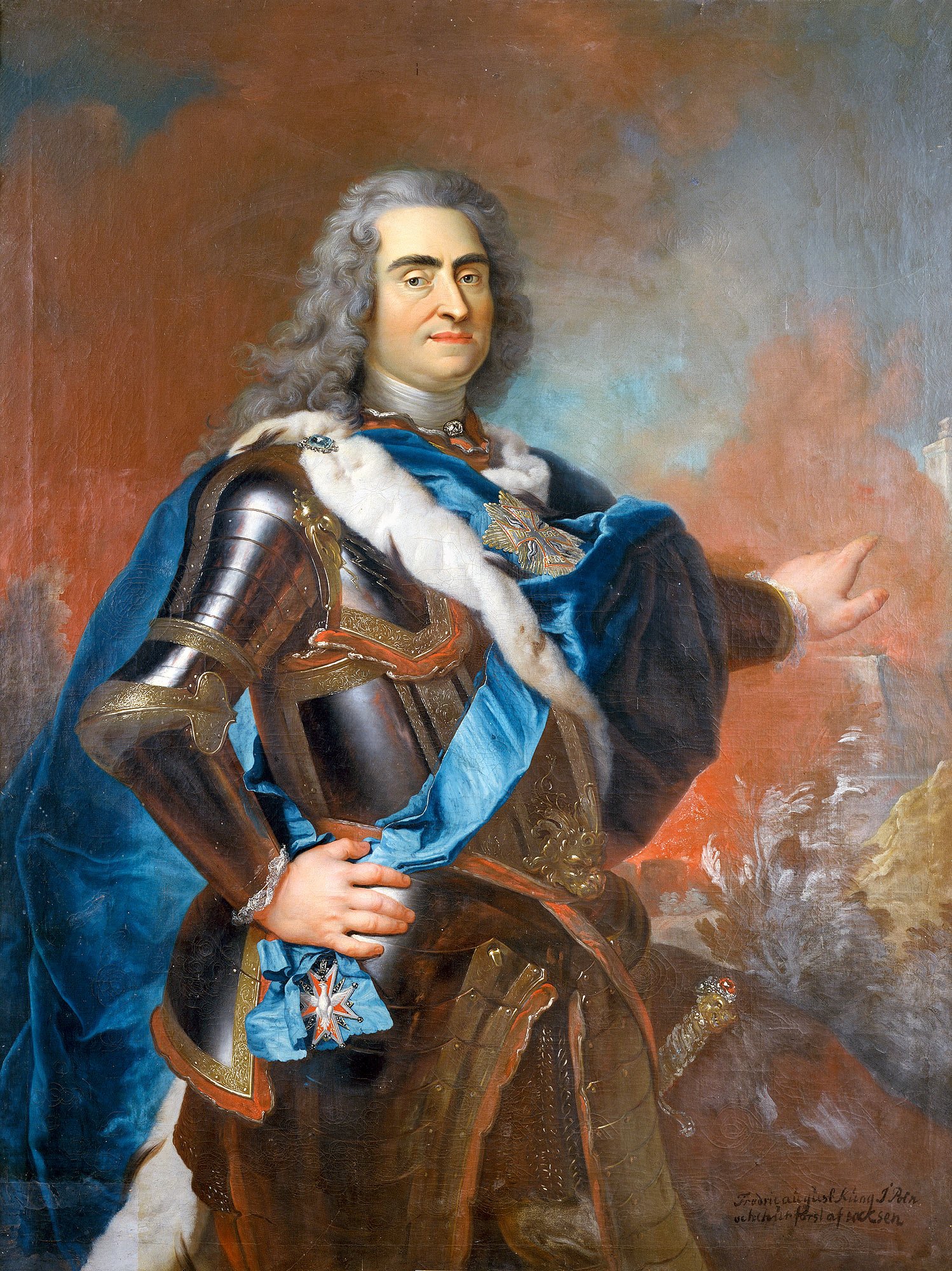
Augustus II the Strong, 1700 - 1760

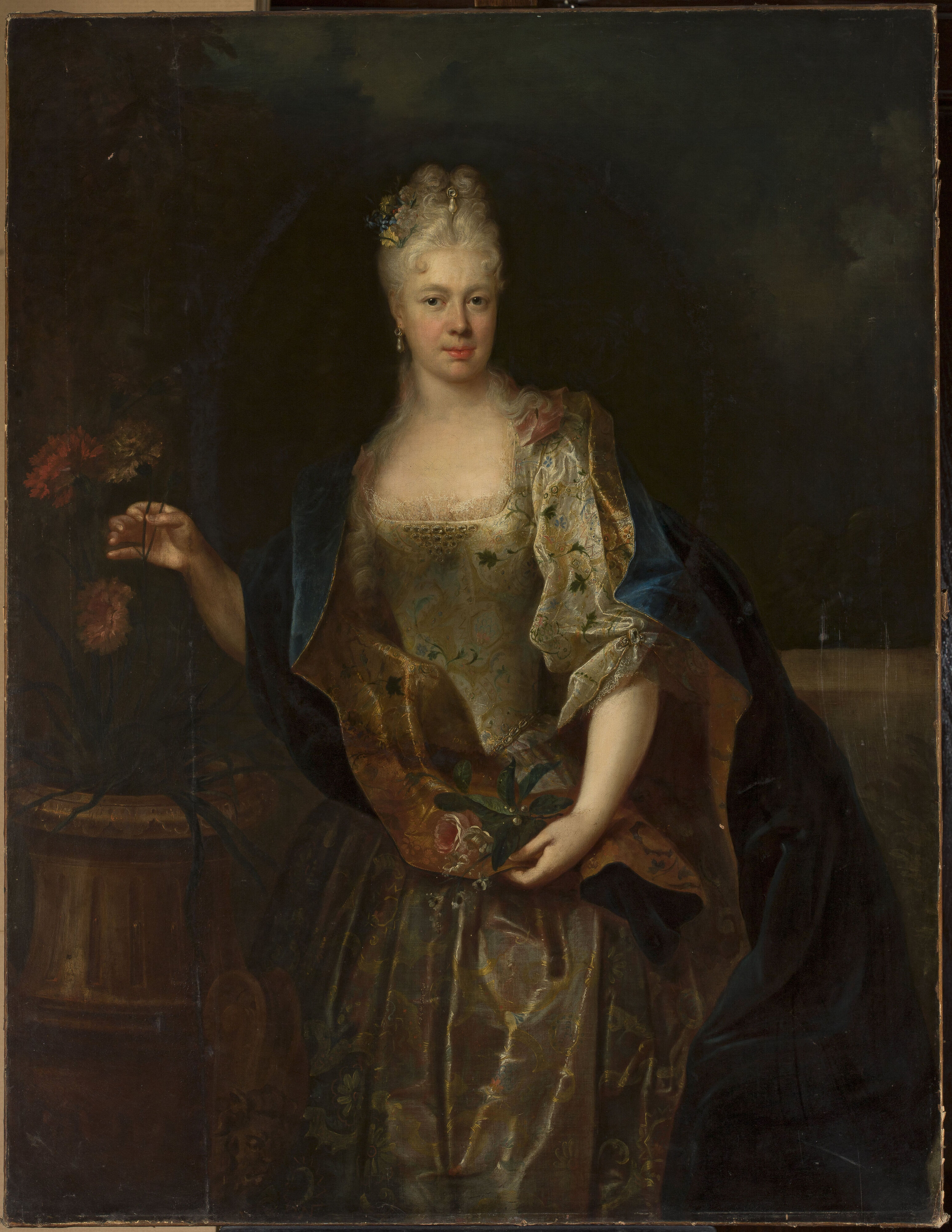
Ludwika Amalia Lubomirska

== Bibliography ==
- Gemäldegalerie Alte Meister, "Old Masters Picture Gallery" in the Zwinger Palace, Dresden.
- Harald Marx: Silvestre, Louis de. In: Neue Deutsche Biographie (NDB). Band 24, Duncker & Humblot, Berlin 2010, ISBN 978-3-428-11205-0, S. 418–420 (Digitalisat).
- Dorota Ewa Olczak: Louis de Silvestre (1675 - 1760) als Porträtmaler in Dresden : über Vorbilder und Vorlagen seiner Kunst mit kritischem Werkkatalog; Teil 1; [Teil 2] / vorgelegt von Dorota Ewa Olczak . - [Mikrofiche-Ausg.] 2013. - 167, 422 S., Berlin, Freie Univ., Diss., 2013.
