= Marie-Maximilienne de Silvestre =

French artist (1708–1798)

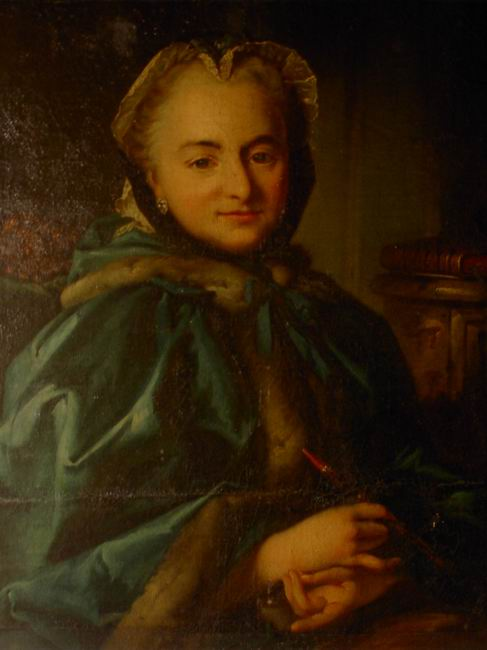
Portrait of Marie-Maximilienne de Silvestre

Marie-Maximilienne de Silvestre (1708–1798) was a French painter.

Born in Paris, Marie-Maximilienne was the daughter of Louis and Marie-Catherine Silvestre, and from youth was taught by them. Soon she was active copying her father's works in pastel. She then became drawing teacher and lectrice to Maria Josepha of Saxony; when the latter became Dauphine and traveled to France in 1747, de Silvestre was the only one of her servants permitted to come along; she received praise for her counsel from Maurice of Saxony, and kept the court in Dresden abreast of Maria's health and events in her life. She also introduced the work of Pietro Rotari to the Dauphine. De Silvestre died in Versailles in 1798.
