= Marie-Catherine Silvestre =

French artist (1680–1743)

Marie-Catherine Silvestre, born Marie-Catherine Hérault (1680–1743) was a French painter.

Born in Paris, Silvestre was the daughter of Charles-Antoine Hérault and his wife Marie-Geneviève, who were her first teachers. In 1706 she married the painter Louis de Silvestre, moving with him in 1716 to Dresden. The couple's daughter Marie-Maximilienne became a pastellist. Silvestre died in Dresden, the year before her husband retired and returned to Paris. Her surviving pastels show the influence of Rosalba Carriera.
