= Jean-Baptiste Belin =

French painter

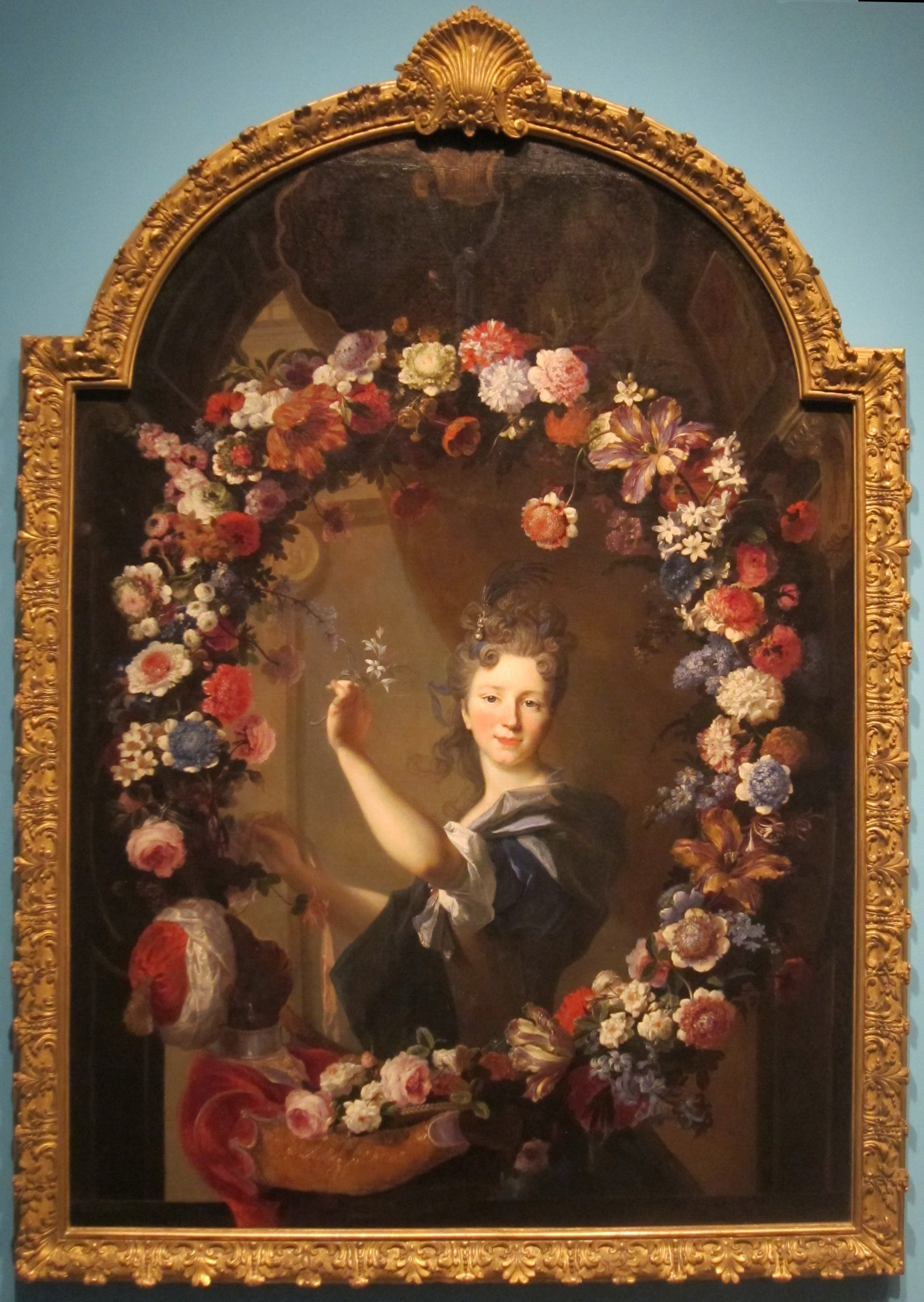
Portrait of Helene Lambert de Thorigny by Nicolas de Largillière (portrait) and Jean-Baptiste Belin (flowers)

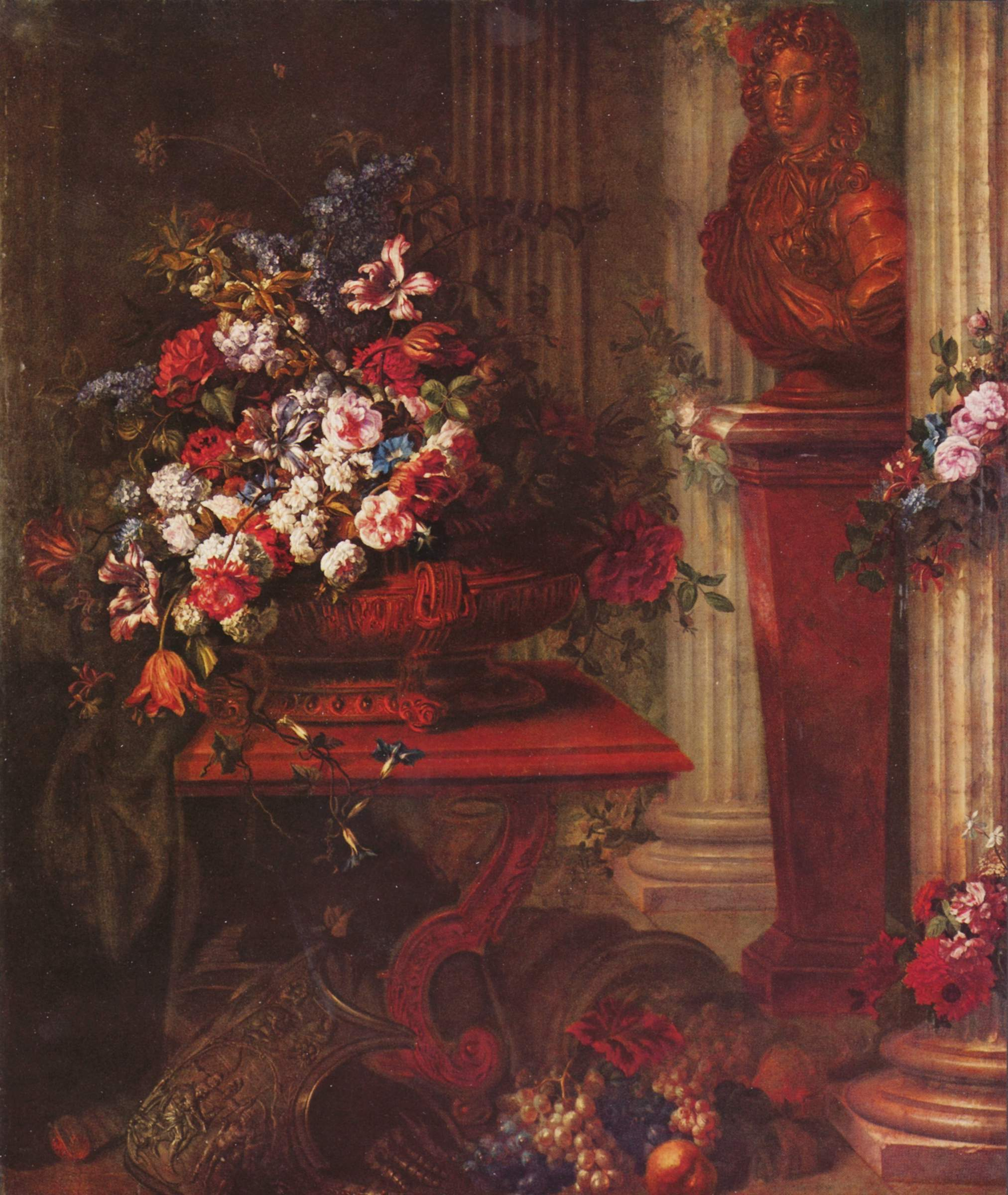
Vase of Flowers with Bronze Bust of Louis XIV

Jean-Baptiste Belin de Fontenay I (1653–1715), also called ‘Jean-Baptiste Belin the Elder’, was a French painter who specialized in flowers.

== Life and work ==
He was born in Caen, Province of Normandy, France in 1653 and died in Paris in 1715. Early in life he was forced to choose between his Protestant religion and his career. The revocation of the Edict of Nantes in 1685 forced most Protestants to flee France to escape religious persecution. Belin decided to renounce his Protestant faith and converted to Catholicism in order to continue his work at the court of Louis XIV. Belin was the pupil of Jean-Baptiste Monnoyer, whose daughter he married, and whom he succeeded as a flower painter at the Gobelins manufactory.

Belin painted floral murals in several of the royal chateaus, including Fontainebleau and Versailles, where he worked on the Escalier de la Reine (Queen's Staircase), since destroyed. He also collaborated with other painters, providing the floral borders in portrait paintings and tapestry cartoons for Gobelins manufactory from 1687. Towards the end of his life, the king honored him by providing him with a pension and lodgings in the Palais du Louvre. One of his sons was named Jean-Baptiste Belin de Fontenay II (1688–1730) and painted in a similar style.

Élysée Palace (Paris), the Fitzwilliam Museum (Cambridge), the Honolulu Museum of Art, the Louvre, the Musée des Beaux-Arts (Caen, France) and Versailles are among the public collections having paintings by Jean-Baptiste Belin de Fontenay I.
