= Charles-Antoine Coypel =

French painter, art critic, and playwright (1694–1752)

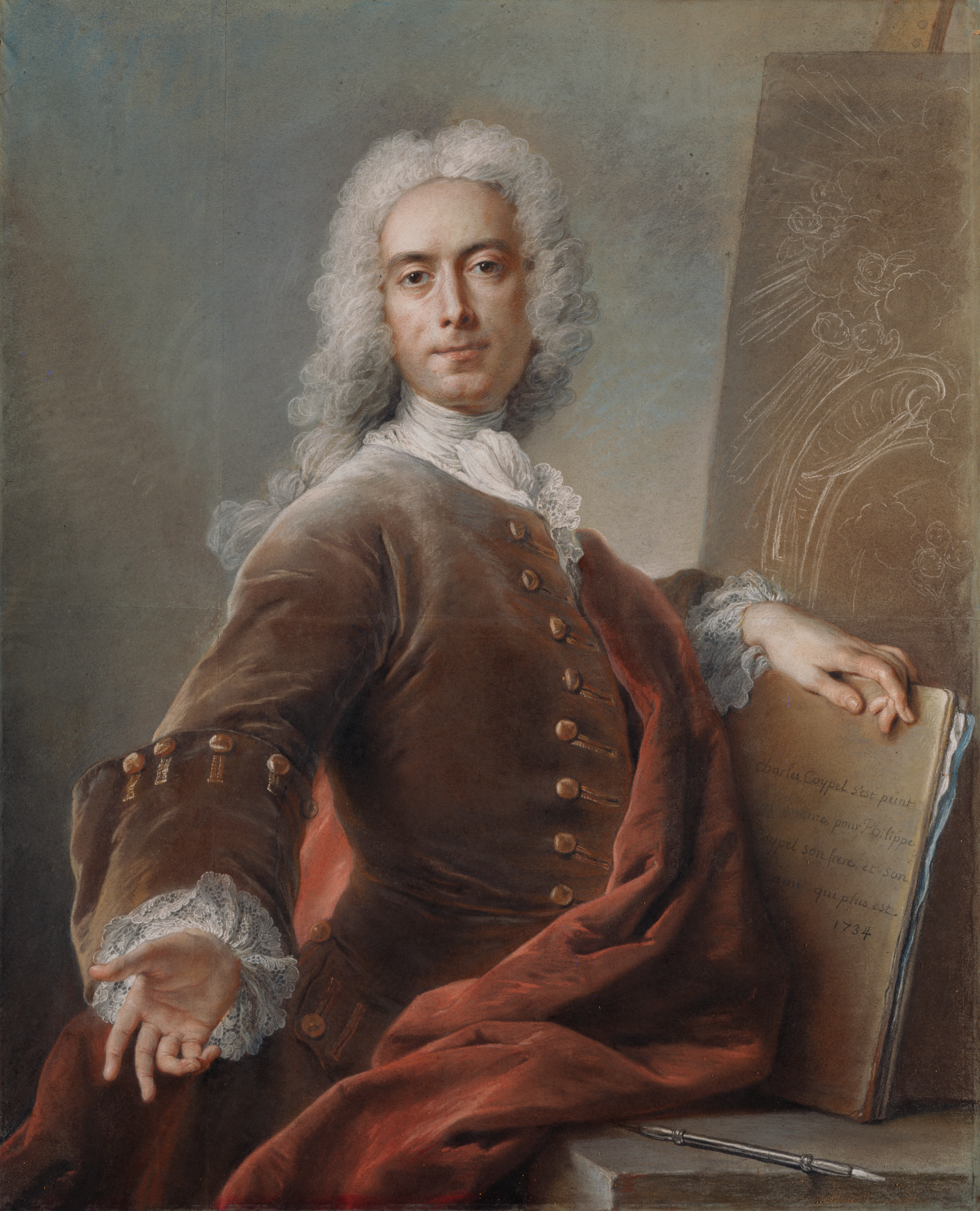
- Self-portrait (1734)
- Born: 11 July 1694; Paris, Kingdom of France
- Died: 14 June 1752 (aged 57); Paris, Kingdom of France
- Education: Antoine Coypel
- Parents: Antoine Coypel (father); Marie-Jeanne Bidault (mother)
- Relatives: Noël Coypel (grandfather), Noël-Nicolas Coypel (half-uncle), Philippe Coypel (brother)

Director of the Académie Royale de Peinture et de Sculpture
- In office 1747–1752
- Monarch: Louis XV
- Preceded by: Pierre-Jacques Cazes
- Succeeded by: Louis de Silvestre

Charles-Antoine Coypel (French pronunciation: [ʃaʁl ɑ̃twan kwapɛl]; 11 July 1694 – 14 June 1752) was a French painter, art critic, and playwright. He became court painter to the French king and director of the Académie Royale. He inherited from his father Antoine the title of Garde des tableaux et dessins du roi (Keeper of the paintings and drawings of the king), a function which combined the role of director and curator of the king's art collection. He was mainly active in Paris.

== Life ==
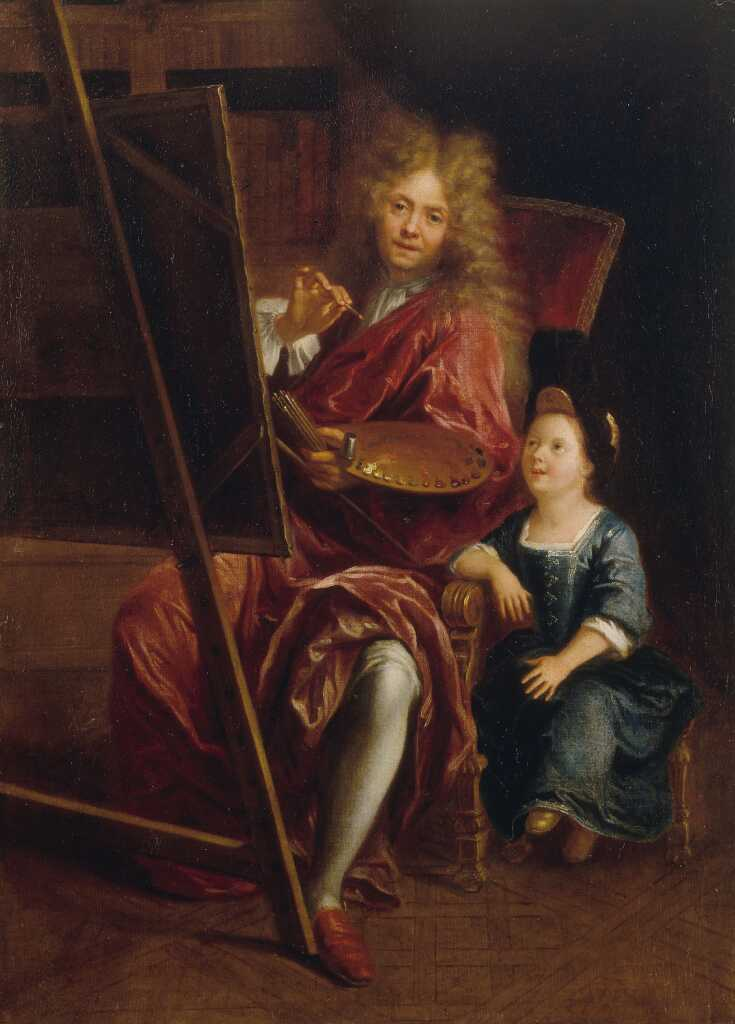
Self-Portrait with his son, Charles-Antoine (1698) by Antoine Coypel

Coypel was born in Paris on 11 July 1694 to a highly successful and influential family of history painters. His grandfather, Noël Coypel, had been Director of the French Academy in Rome as well as the Académie Royale de Peinture et de Sculpture. Antoine Coypel, Charles-Antoine's father, received numerous commissions from the French Royal Family, particularly Philippe II, Duke of Orléans. He would also become Director of the Académie Royale in 1714 and Premier Peintre du Roi the following year. Philippe Coypel (1703–1777), Antoine Coypel's second son, would become the King's valet de chambre.

Coypel would live in the Louvre Palace for almost his entire life, beginning when he was three years old, when his father received a brevêt de logement (residence permit) in 1697. His family's quarters comprised at least fifteen rooms beneath the Grande Galerie as well as a three thousand square foot studio space, all of which Coypel would eventually inherit.

Under the tutelage of his father, Coypel showed a genuine talent for painting early in life. He had the rare distinction of being named an agréé and subsequently an académicien by the Académie Royale on the same day in 1715 for his reception work Jason and Medea. Coypel was just twenty-one years old, but he had skipped the customary journey to Rome made by history painters, and perhaps more importantly, his father was Director at the time.

He inherited his father's design and painting duties as premier peintre to the Duke of Orléans when his father died in 1722. He became Premier Peintre du Roi and Director of the Académie Royale in 1747. He worked on several commissions for paintings for the royal Palace of Versailles, and for Louis XV and his wife, Queen Marie Leczinska.

== Work ==
Coypel was an excellent tapestry designer. He designed tapestries for the Gobelins manufactory. His most successful tapestries were created from a series illustrating Don Quixote. Coypel was the first to illustrate Don Quixote in a sophisticated manner. These illustrations were painted as cartoons for tapestries, and were engraved and published in a deluxe folio in Paris in 1724. Coypel created twenty-eight small paintings for these tapestries over a number of years. Each of the paintings was used as the centrepiece of a larger area that was richly decorated with birds, small animals, and garlands of flowers on a patterned background. Over two hundred pieces of the Don Quixote series were woven between 1714 and 1794. He received a commission to design a series of theatrical scenes for tapestries for the queen of Poland in 1747. Coypel also wrote prose, several comedies, two tragedies, and some poetry.

Alongside his painting career, Coypel wrote some forty plays between 1717 and 1747. Only Les Folies de Cardenio (1720) was published. It was staged at the Tuileries Palace in 1721. In La Poésie et la Peinture (Allegory of Painting), allegorical comedy in three acts, the artist compared the qualities of both arts. The painter also realized works on the theme of the theater, including portraits of the Comédie-Française players Charlotte Desmares and Adrienne Lecouvreur.

== Selected works ==
- Jason and Medea (1715) – Coypel's reception piece for the Académie Royale, now at Schloss Charlottenburg in Berlin
- Painting Ejecting Thalia (1732) – Norfolk, Chrysler Museum of Art
- Self-Portrait (1734) – J. Paul Getty Museum, Los Angeles
- Fury of Achilles (1737) – Hermitage Museum, Saint Petersburg
- Self-Portrait (1739) – Musée des Beaux-Arts d'Orléans
- Portrait of Philippe Coypel and His Wife (1742) – Exhibited at the Salon of 1742, now at the Art Institute of Chicago

== Gallery ==
Works by Charles-Antoine Coypel

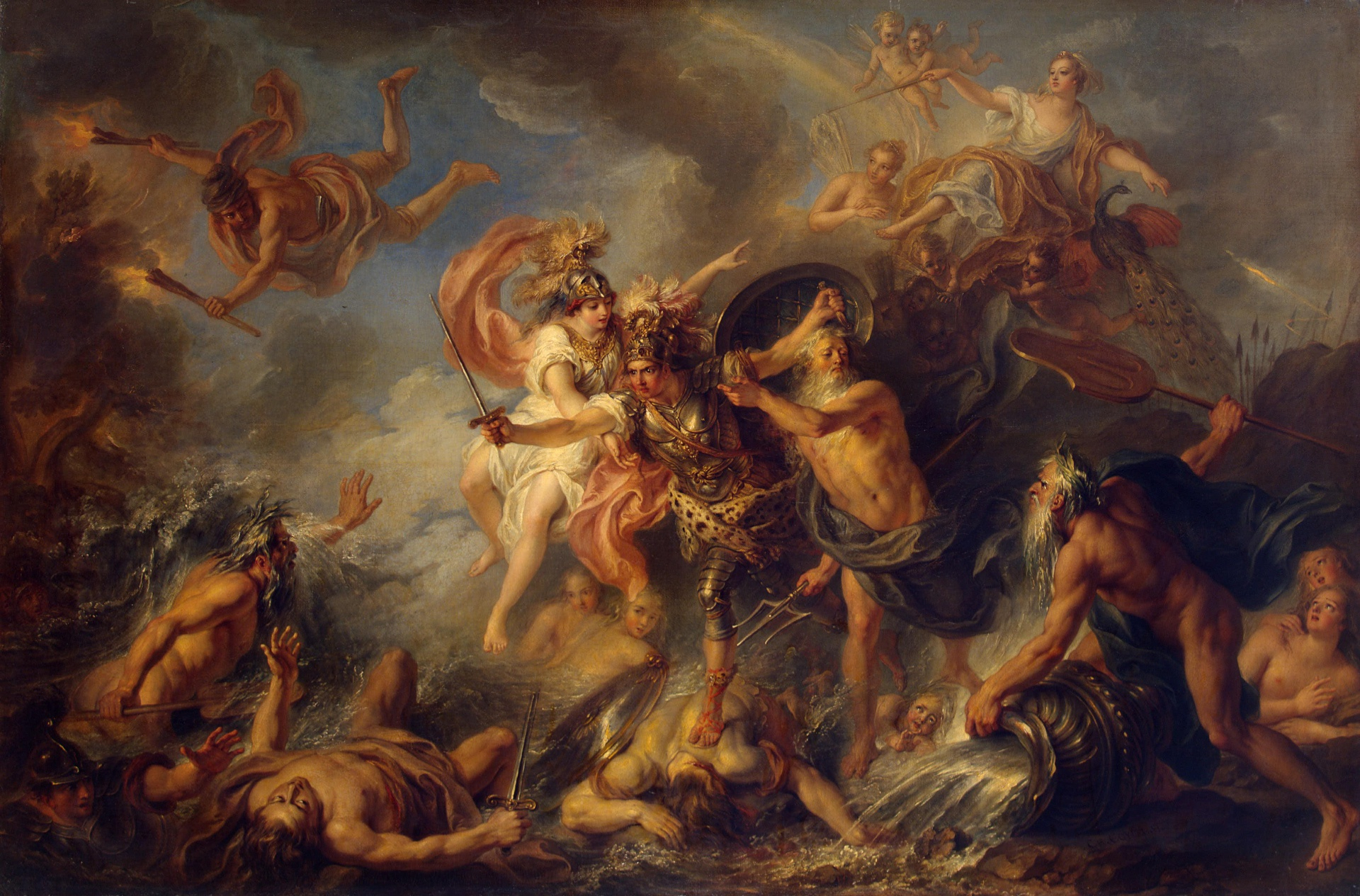
Fury of Achilles (1737)

Joseph Accused by Potiphar's Wife (1737)

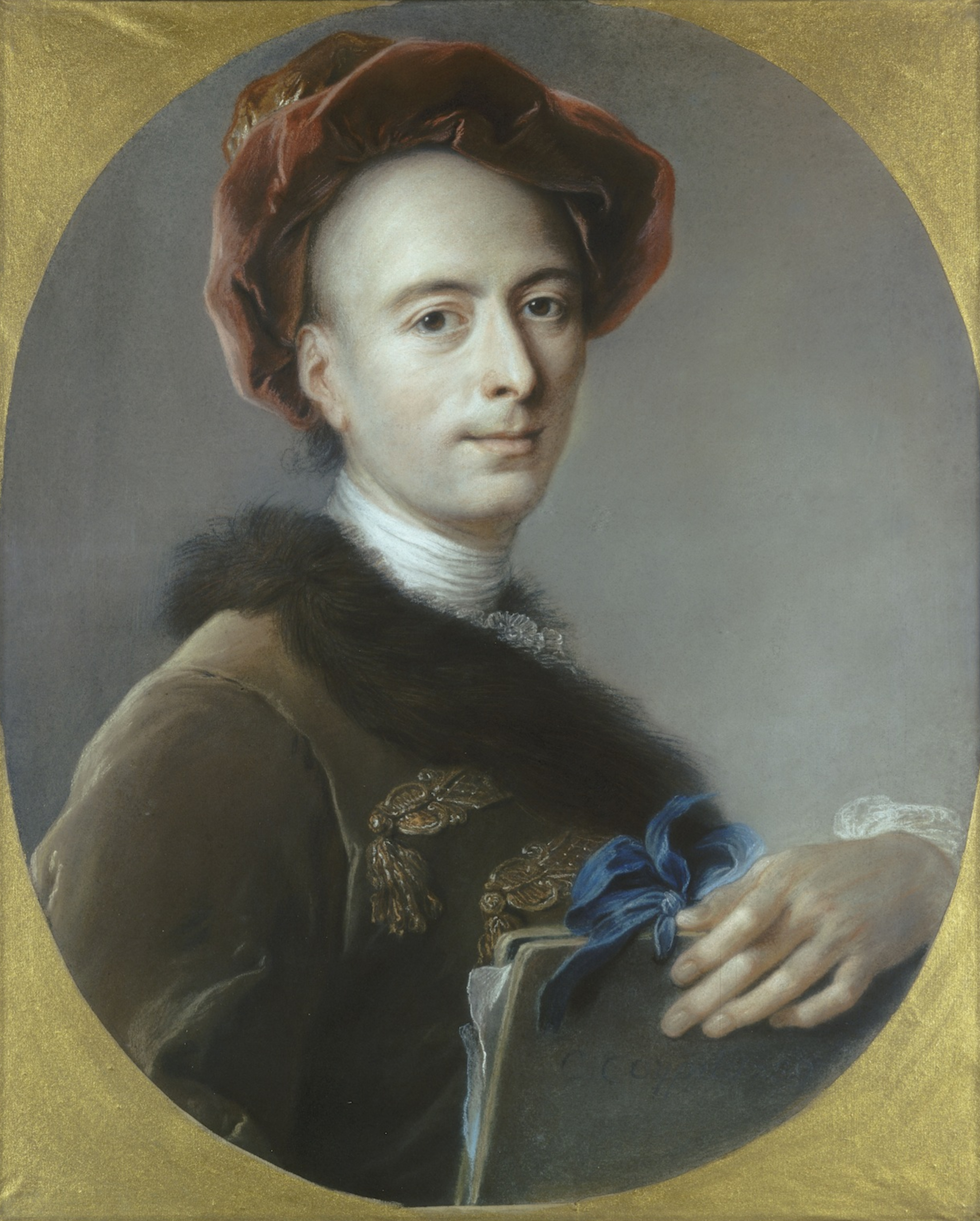
Self-portrait (1739)

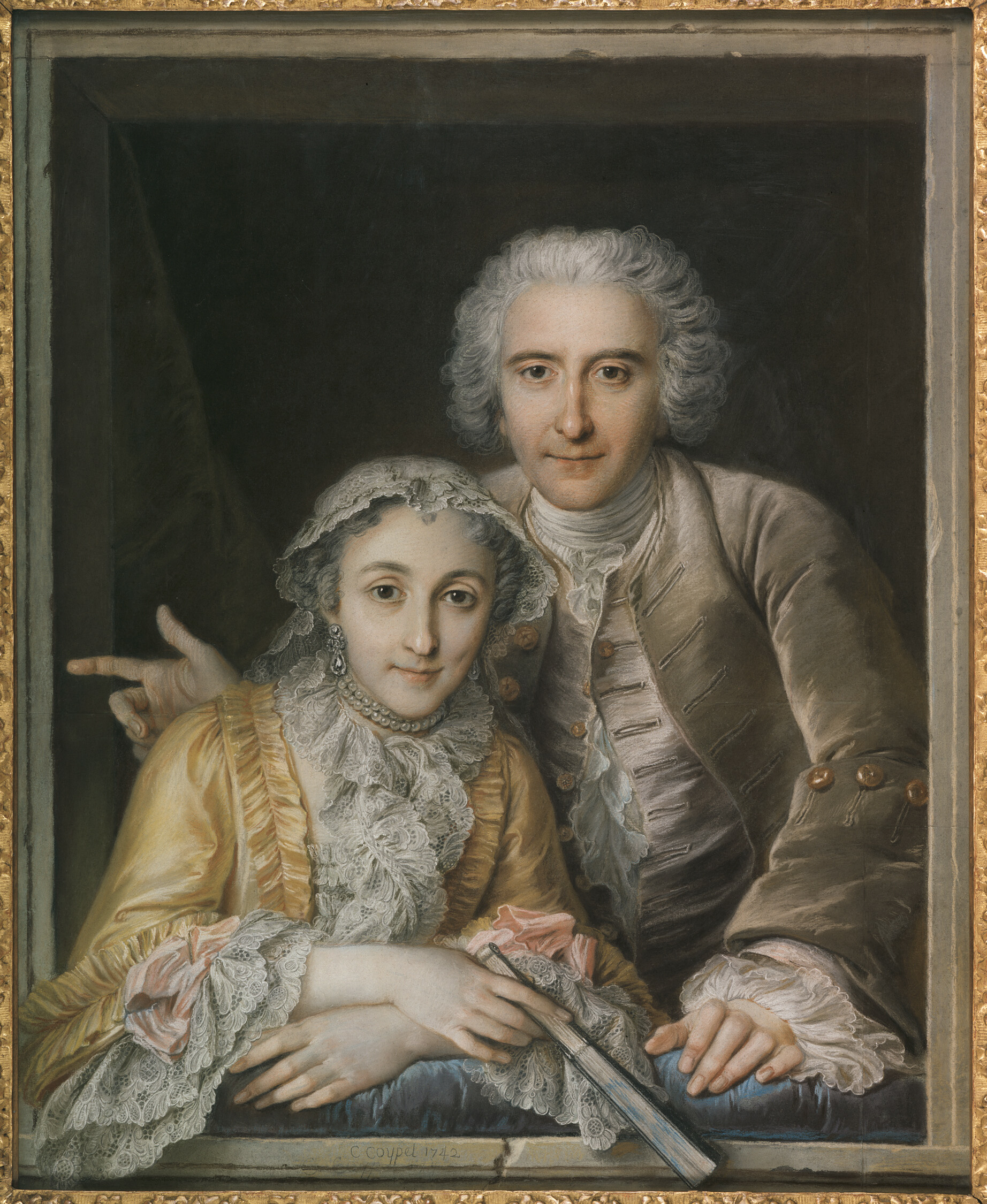
Portrait of Philippe Coypel and His Wife (1742)

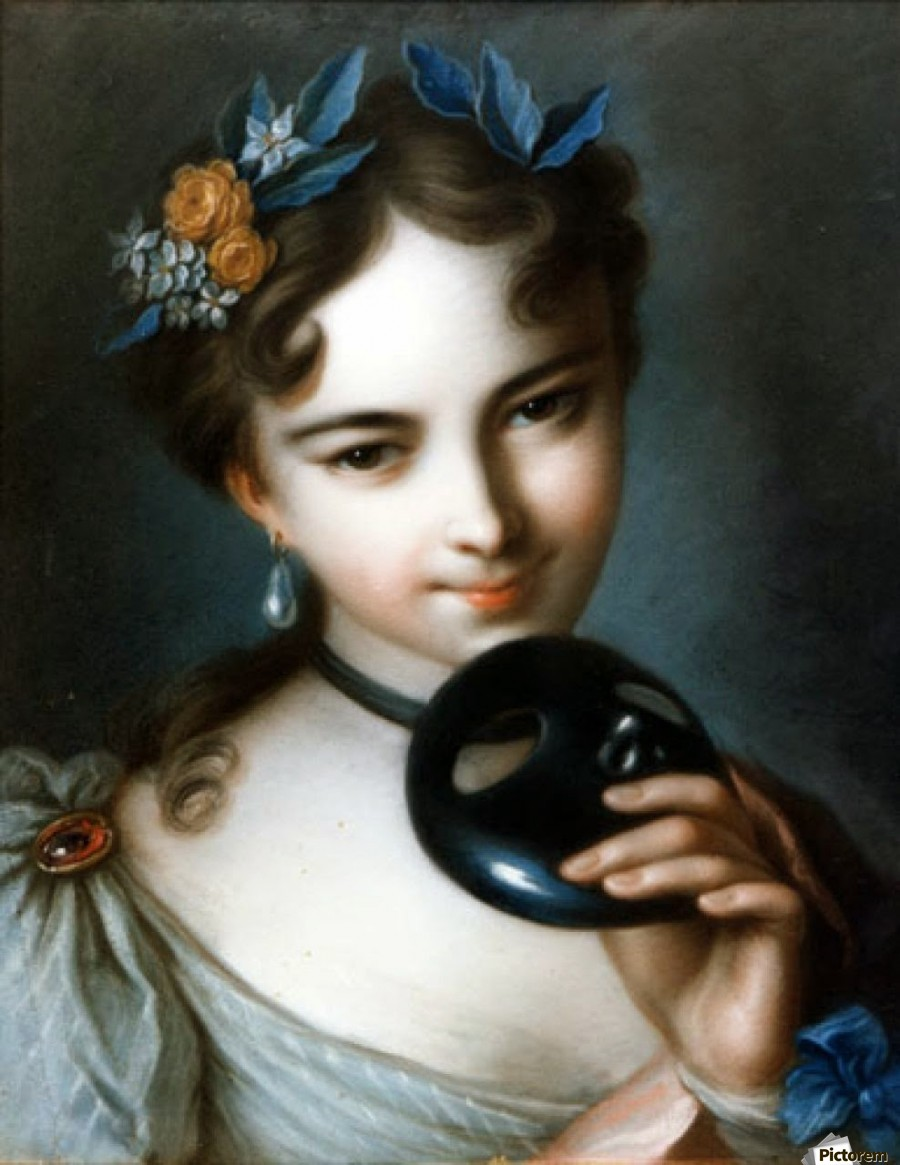
Young Girl Holding a Mask, 1745

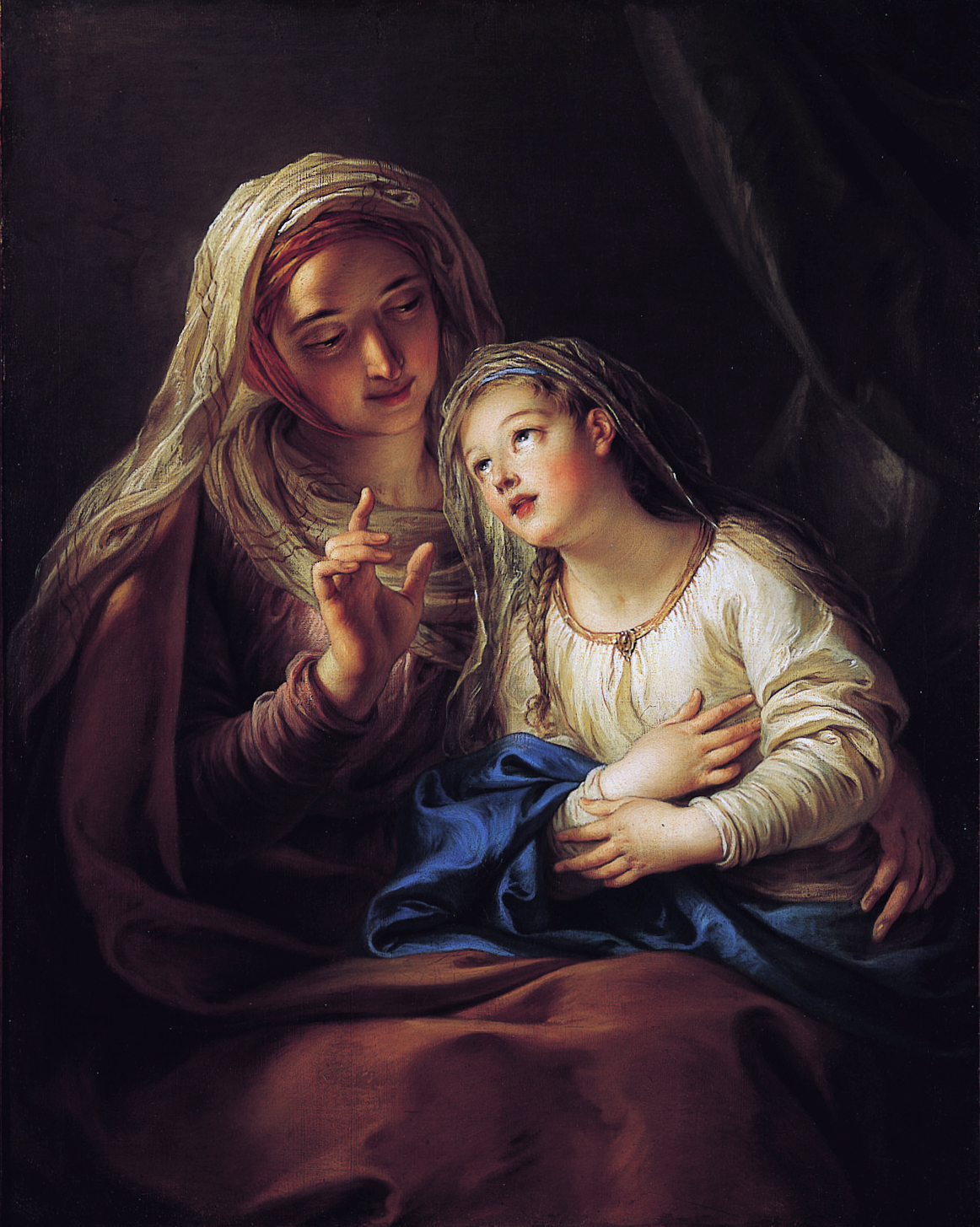
Education of the Virgin, c 1735-37
