= Venus Callipyge =

Type of antique Venus

Coordinates: 40°51′12.16″N 14°15′1.75″E

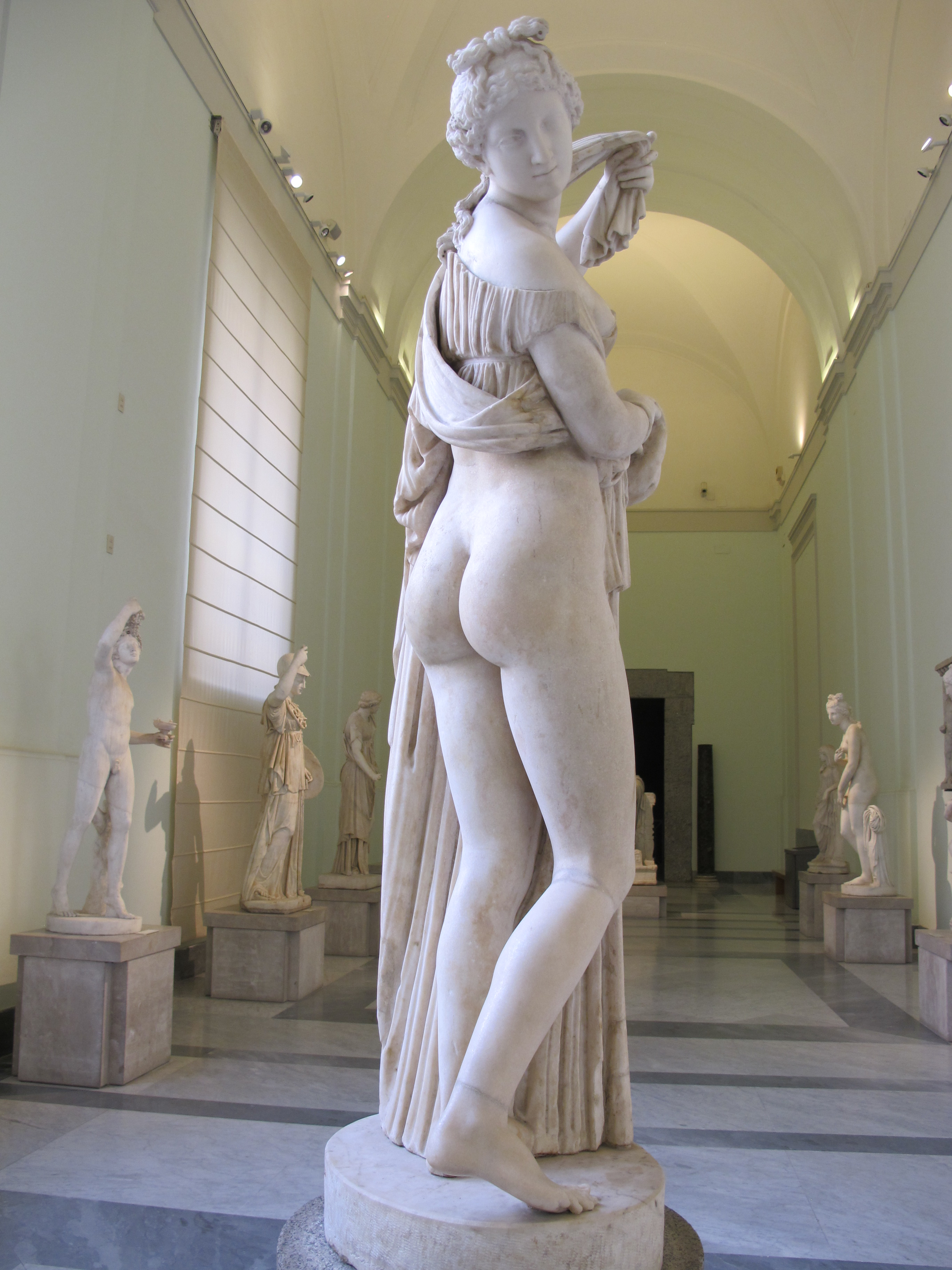
- Year: c. 1st or 2nd century BC
- Medium: Marble sculpture
- Location: National Archaeological Museum, Naples, Italy
- Accession: 6020

The Venus Callipyge, also known as the Aphrodite Kallipygos (Greek: Ἀφροδίτη Καλλίπυγος) or the Callipygian Venus, all literally meaning "Venus (or Aphrodite) of the beautiful buttocks", (Note: From the Greek words κάλλος (beauty) and πυγη (buttocks). The English "callipygian" has the same derivation and meaning.) is an Ancient Roman marble statue, thought to be a copy of an older Greek original. In an example of anasyrma, it depicts a partially draped woman, raising her light peplos to uncover her hips and buttocks, and looking back and down over her shoulder, perhaps to evaluate them. The subject is conventionally identified as Venus (Aphrodite), though it may equally be a portrait of a mortal woman.

The marble statue extant today dates to the late 1st century BC. The lost Greek original on which it is based is thought to have been bronze, and to have been executed around 300 BC, towards the beginning of the Hellenistic period. The provenance of the marble copy is unknown, but it was rediscovered, missing its head, in the early modern period. The head was restored, first in the 16th century and again in the 18th century (in which case the sculptor followed the earlier restoration fairly closely); the restored head was made to look over the shoulder, drawing further attention to the statue's bare buttocks, thereby contributing to its popularity. In the 17th and 18th centuries, the statue was identified as Venus and associated with a temple to Aphrodite Kallipygos at Syracuse, discussed by Athenaeus in his Deipnosophistae. The statue was copied a number of times, including by Jean-Jacques Clérion and François Barois.

It is part of the Farnese Collection in the National Archaeological Museum, Naples (Inv. numb. 6020).

== History ==
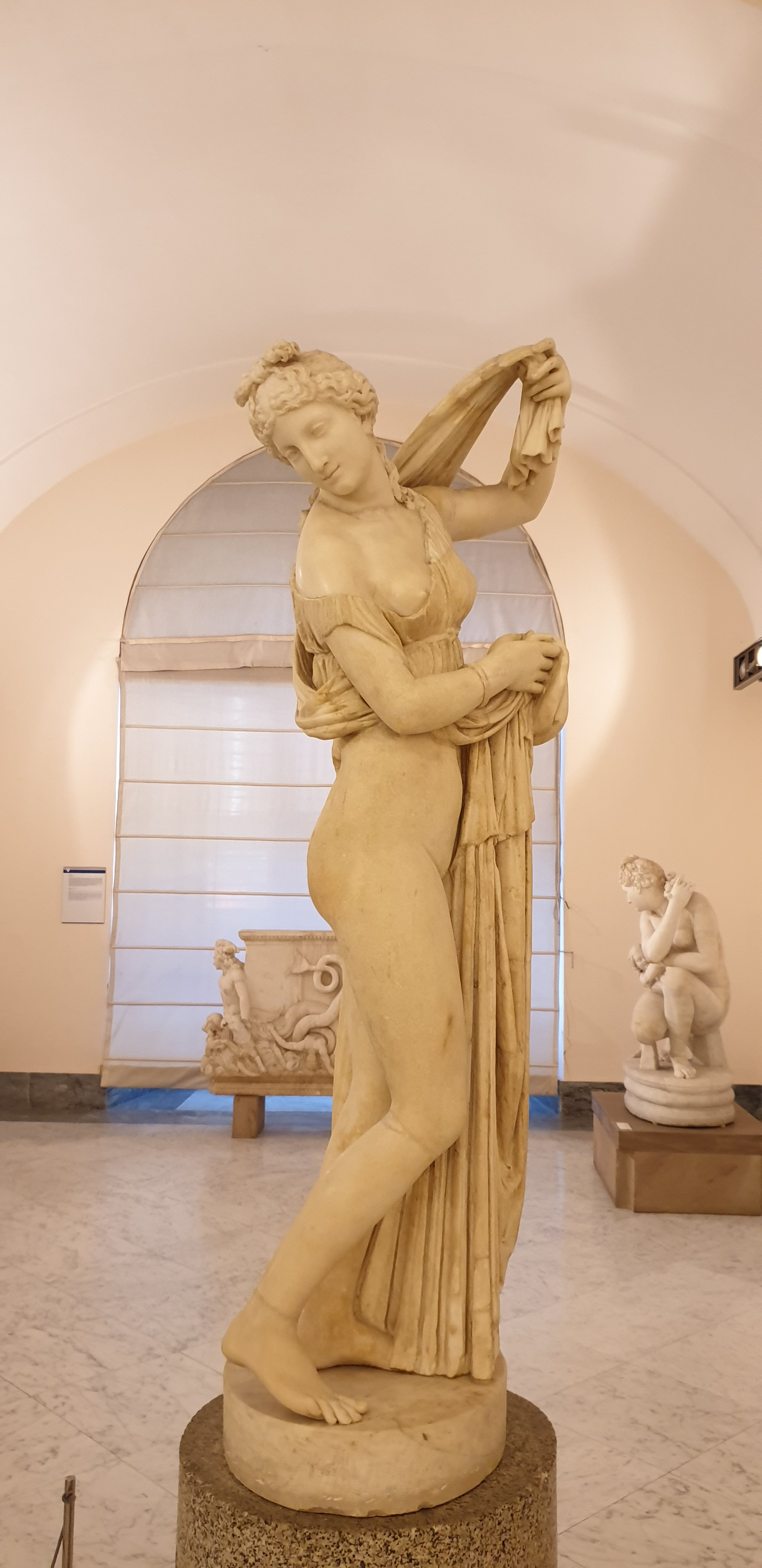
Callipygian Venus (Naples)

The "Venus Kallipygos" in the National Archaeological Museum, Naples is a Roman work in marble, dating to the late 1st century BC. It is considered to be a copy or "paraphrase" of an older Greek statue, probably bronze. This lost original is thought to have been created around 300 BC, near the inception of the Hellenistic period. The marble version's sculptor and provenance are unknown. It was rediscovered, missing its head, in Rome by at least the 16th century. It is sometimes said to have been found in the ruins of Emperor Nero's Domus Aurea, though this is unlikely, as fragments uncovered there contained no evidence of high-quality works of art such as the Venus.

The missing head was reconstructed in the 16th century. The restorer decided to have the figure look over her shoulder at her own buttocks, a choice that gave the Venus its distinctive pose and had a significant effect on later interpretations of the work. The statue was acquired by the Farnese family and was in the Palazzo Farnese by 1594; it may be the draped Venus described as being in the palace by visitors earlier that century. In the 17th century, it is known to have been kept in the palace's Sala dei Filosophi, where it stood surrounded by statues of eighteen ancient philosophers. In 1731, the Farnese estate was inherited by Charles of Bourbon, who moved some of the marbles, including the Venus, across the Tiber River to the Villa Farnesina.

In 1786, the Bourbons decided to move the Venus Kallipygos to Naples with the rest of the Farnese Collection. First, however, it was sent to be restored by Carlo Albacini. Responding to contemporary criticisms of some of the statue's features, Albacini replaced the head, the arms, and one leg; he followed the previous restoration fairly faithfully in having the figure look back over her shoulder. By 1792, the statue was at the Museo di Capodimonte in Naples, and by 1802 it was in the Museo degli Studi, now the Naples National Archaeological Museum, where it remains.

== Interpretations ==
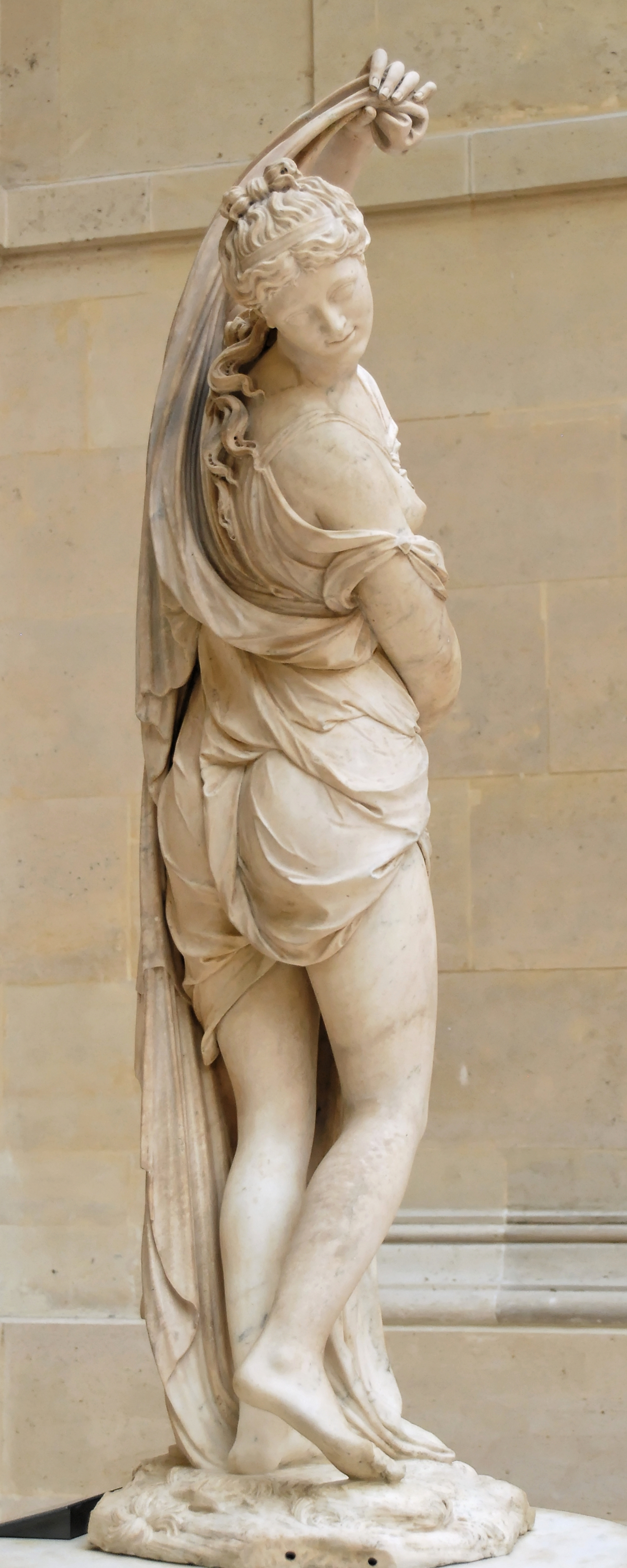
Venus Callipyge by François Barois, 1683–1686 (Musée du Louvre)

The restorers' decision to have the figure look over her back greatly affected subsequent interpretations, to the point that the classicists Mary Beard and J. G. W. Henderson describe it as having "created a 'masterpiece' in place of a fragment". The restored statue's pose draws further attention to the naked buttocks and gives the figure a distinctly erotic aspect. The restoration recalled in the minds of viewers a story recorded in Athenaeus's Deipnosophistae about the founding of a temple of "Aphrodite Kallipygos" in ancient Syracuse, Sicily. According to Athenaeus, two beautiful sisters from a farm near Syracuse argued over which of them had the shapelier buttocks and accosted a young passerby to have him judge. They showed themselves off to the traveler, the son of a rich man, and he voted for the elder sister. Subsequently, he became smitten with her and fell ill with love-sickness. Learning what had happened, the man's younger brother went out to see the girls for himself and fell in love with the younger sister. Thereafter the brothers refused to consider any other brides, so their father arranged for the sisters to come marry them. The citizens dubbed the sisters "Kallipugoi" ("Women with Beautiful Buttocks"), and with their new-found prosperity, they dedicated a temple to Aphrodite, calling her Kallipygos.

Other sources mention the cult of Aphrodite Kallipygos at Syracuse. The Christian writer Clement of Alexandria includes it in a list of erotic manifestations of pagan religion. From the 16th century, Athenaeus's tale circulated in Vincenzo Cartari's retelling of stories from classical mythology, Le Imagini. Many viewers of the 17th and 18th centuries identified the statue's subject as the goddess and supposed the work to be a cult statue from the temple of Venus Kallipygos. It was thus often described at the time as Venus exiting the bath. Others identified it instead with one of the "beautiful-buttocked" girls from Athenaeus's story, and as such it was alternatively known as "La Belle Victorieuse" or "La Bergère Grecque".

In 1836, Famin called it a "charming statuette" but noted that it was "placed in a reserved hall, where the curious are only introduced under the surveillance of a guardian, though even this precaution has not prevented the rounded forms which won for the goddess the name of Callipyge, from being covered with a dark tint, which betrays the profane kisses that fanatic admirers have every day impressed there. We ourselves knew a young German tourist smitten with a mad passion for this voluptuous marble; and the commiseration his state of mind inspired set aside all idea of ridicule."

== Modern copies ==
The earliest known copy of the Venus is a bronze statuette in the collection of the Ashmolean Museum, attributed to the 16th-century Flemish sculptor Hans Mont. A marble copy by Jean-Jacques Clérion (1686) was sent to Versailles. Another copy was made by François Barois during his residence at the French Academy in Rome, 1683–1686. It was sent to Versailles, then to Marly-le-Roi in 1695, where it was provided with additional marble draperies by Jean Thierry, not to offend an increasingly prudish public taste; it remained at Marly until the Revolution, when it found its way to the Jardin des Tuileries.

Augustus the Strong ordered a copy, which was executed by Pierre de l'Estache in Rome between 1722 and 1723, for the Grosser Garten, Dresden. However, it was destroyed in 1945.

Sir Henry Hoare, 5th Baronet commissioned a copy of the Venus (likely by John Cheere) to be embedded in the niches of the newly constructed Pantheon on the Stourhead Estate in 1753–1754.

In the eighteenth century, copies of the Venus were made in bronze, plaster, ceramic, and marble.

== Modern appreciation ==
The 19th-century identification was repopularised by the 20th-century lyrics of the French lyricist Georges Brassens, in his "Vénus Callipyge", which seems explicitly to reference Jean de La Fontaine in his Conte tiré d'Athénée, among the posthumous tales (the third under that title in the so-called contes libertins, the first two in the Première partie, published 10 January 1665), which paraphrases Athenaeus's account and ends in direct reference to the famous buttocks:

c'eût été le temple de la Grèce/ Pour qui j'eusse eu plus de dévotion
this would have been the temple of Greece/ For which I would have professed the most devotion.

Metallic Venus, Jeff Koons's modern interpretation made of polished steel, is from his Antiquity Series. The chrome-finished sculpture celebrates the original themes of beauty, fertility, and innocence but with a modern perspective. Fresh flowers in the piece are replaced daily, representing the throwaway, consumerist culture of modern society.

== See also ==
- Dimples of Venus

== General and cited references ==
- Beard, Mary; Henderson, John (2001). Classical Art: from Greece to Rome. Oxford University Press. ISBN 0-19-284237-4.
- Dericksen Brinkerhoff, review of Aphrodite Kallipygos by Gosta Saflund and Peter M. Fraser - American Journal of Archaeology, Vol. 69, No. 1 (Jan., 1965), pp. 78–79.
- Fenton, James (2000). Leonardo's Nephew: Essays on Art and Artists. University of Chicago Press. ISBN 0-226-24147-5.
- Haskell, Francis; Penny, Nicholas (1981). Taste and the Antique: The Lure of Classical Sculpture, 1500-1900. Yale University Press. ISBN 0300026412.
- Havelock, Christine Mitchell (2007). The Aphrodite of Knidos and Her Successors: A Historical Review of the Female Nude in Greek Art. University of Michigan Press. ISBN 978-0-472-03277-8.
- Moormann, Eric M. (2003). "Review of Laurentino García y García, Luciana Jacobelli, Louis Barré, 2001. Museo Segreto. With a Facsimile edition of Herculanum et Pompéi. Recueil général des peintures, bronzes, mosaïques... (1877)". Bryn Mawr Classical Review. 20.
