= Charles-François Poerson =

French painter

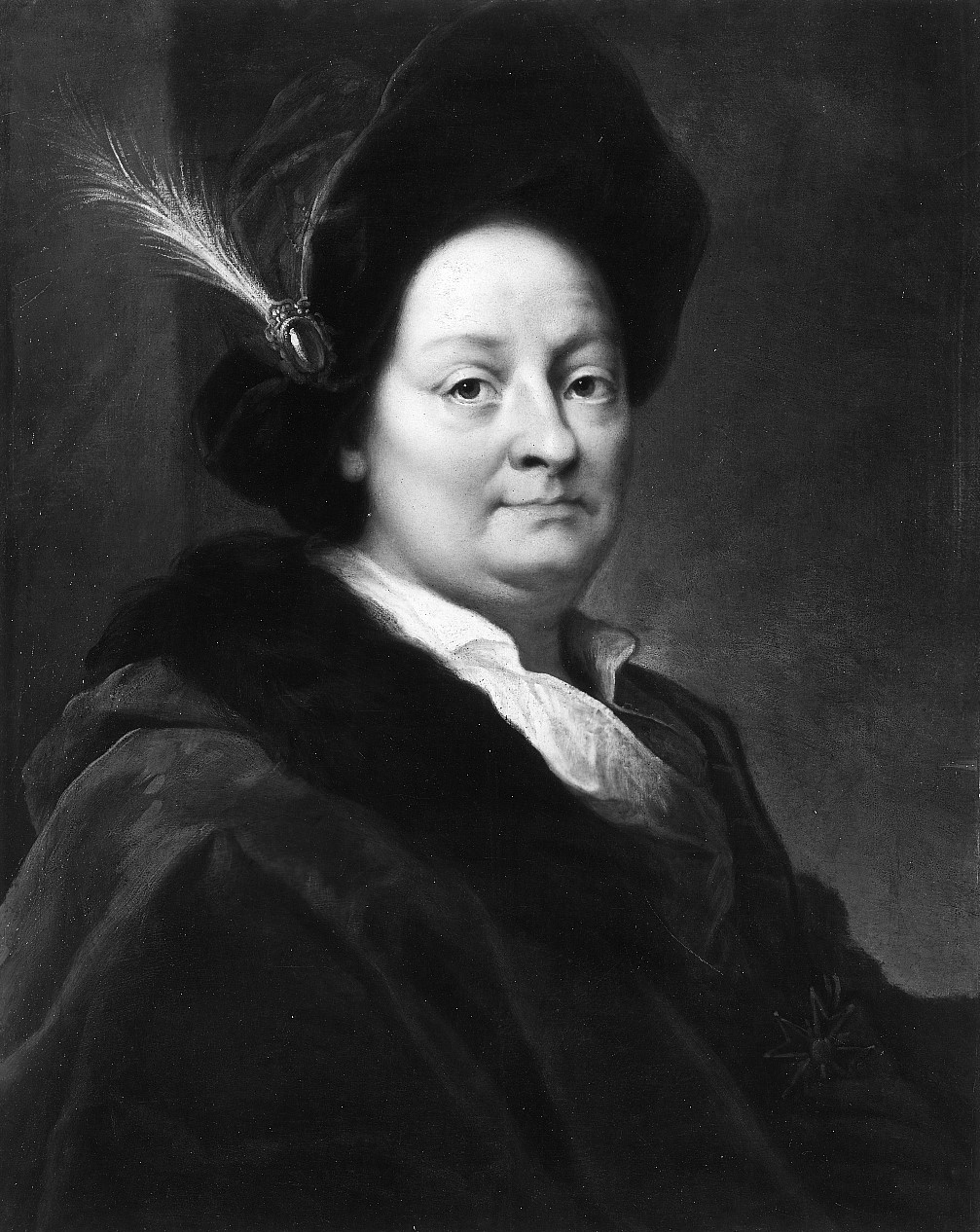
Self-portrait, 1716

Charles François Poerson (1653 – 2 September 1725) was a French painter. He was director of the French Academy in Rome from 1704 until his death.

== Biography ==
Poerson studied under his own father Charles Poerson and under Noël Coypel. His notable works include "Dispute Between Neptune and Minerva" at Château de Fontainebleau, "Union of the Académie royale de Paris and the Academy of Saint Luke in Rome" at Versailles and participation in the decoration of the Hôtel des Invalides. He was buried in San Luigi dei Francesi, Rome, in a tomb attributed to the sculptor Pierre de L'Estache, who later became another director of the academy.
