= Charles Errard =

French painter and draughtsman (c. 1606/9–1689)

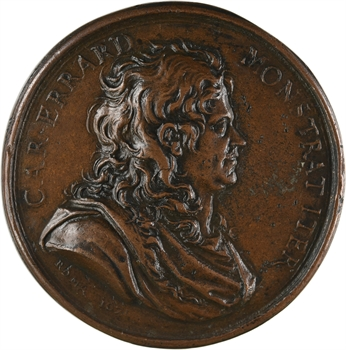
- Portrait bust of Errard on bronze medal from 1671
- Born: c. 1606/9; Nantes, France
- Died: 25 May 1689 (aged 80 or 83); Rome, Papal States
- Resting place: Santa Trinità dei Monti
- Father: Charles Errard

Director of The French Academy in Rome
- In office 1666–1672
- Succeeded by: Noël Coypel
- In office 1675–1684
- Preceded by: Noël Coypel
- Succeeded by: Matthieu de La Teulière

Director of the Académie de Peinture et de Sculpture
- In office 1675–1683
- Monarch: Louis XIV
- Preceded by: Antoine de Ratabon
- Succeeded by: Charles Le Brun

Charles Errard (c. 1606/9–25 May 1689), also known as Charles Errard the Younger, was a French painter, draughtsman, engraver, writer, as well as co-founder and later director of the Académie Royale de Peinture et de Sculpture. He was also the Director of the French Academy in Rome from 1666 to 1672 and again from 1675 to 1684.

== Biography ==
Errard was born in Nantes in 1606 or 1609 to Charles Errard (1570–c. 1635), an artist from Bressuire, and Jeanne Cremé. His father, known as 'the Elder' to distinguish him from his son, was affiliated with the French royal family. Louis XIII appointed Errard chief architect for the fortifications in Brittany in 1615. And in 1621, he helped in the decoration of the Luxembourg Palace in Paris for the king's mother, Marie de Medici.

The son's long career as an artist in France was interrupted by several stays in Rome, going there to study with his father in 1625, equipped with a royal scholarship, and again in 1627. He drew ancient works of art as well as figures, busts, reliefs, ornament and Trajan's Column, as well as contemporary buildings. Soon he became a brilliant draughtsman. He became acquainted with Poussin and his patron Cassiano dal Pozzo, for whom he painted two pictures.

After his return to Paris in 1643, he worked for different French art lovers and collectors including, among others, the brothers Paul Fréart de Chantelou and Roland Fréart de Chambray.

In 1648, Errard was one of the founders of the Académie Royale de Peinture et de Sculpture (French Royal Academy of Painting and Sculpture) and was elected as one of the original twelve elders in charge of its running.

In 1651, according to Stiche, he produced illustrations after Poussin's sketches to Leonardo da Vinci's Trattato della Pittura. After his appointment as decorator of the royal palace, he received orders for the decoration of the Louvre Palace, the Palace of Fontainebleau (queen mother's suite), Saint-Germain-en-Laye and Versailles. He was also active as a scenery painter for the royal opera.

As an engraver, he illustrated, among other things, the Vite by Giovanni Pietro Bellori and an anatomical Atlas for the scholars of the French Academy in Rome, one of the first anatomical books for artists generally. In 1664–65 he carried out an art-collecting trip to Flanders on the king's behalf. In 1666, Louis XIV's minister Jean-Baptiste Colbert sent him to found the French Academy in Rome, where he was director until 1684 (apart from 1673 to 1675, when he was replaced by Noël Coypel).

Rivalries with Charles Le Brun led him to take another trip to Rome, this time taking twelve scholars with him to establish the Académie de France à Rome on behalf of his promoter, the French minister Colbert. He was selected in 1673 and 1675 to be the Principal of the Accademia di San Luca. Errard was also formally the director of the Académie Royale de Peinture et de Sculpture from 1675 to 1683, but his absence from Paris meant that Le Brun was de facto in charge. After the death of Colbert in 1683, Errard resigned his offices.

On his death in Rome aged 80 or 83, he was buried in Santa Trinità dei Monti. He left Louis XIV bronze copies of Florentine sculptures, particularly (but not only) from Michelangelo's sculptures in the Medici Chapel – these are now in the Louvre.

== Gallery (partial) ==
Works by Charles Errard

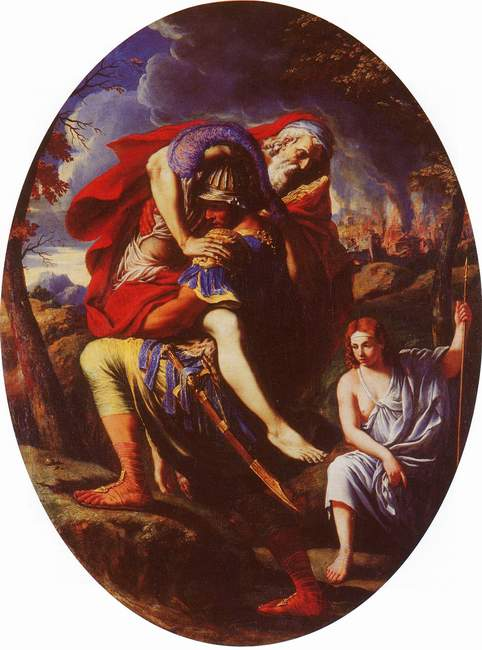
Aeneas carrying Anchises

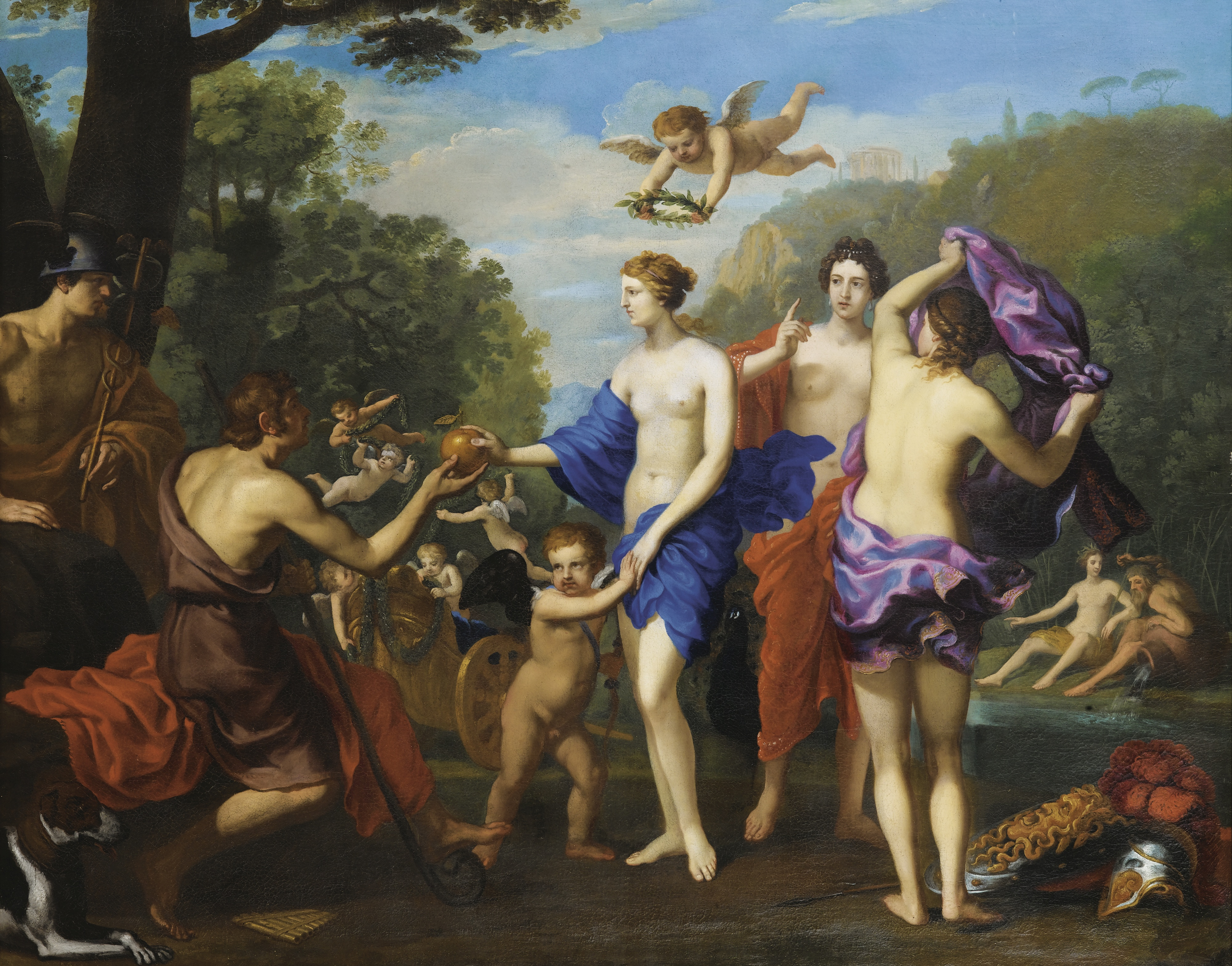
Le jugement de Paris

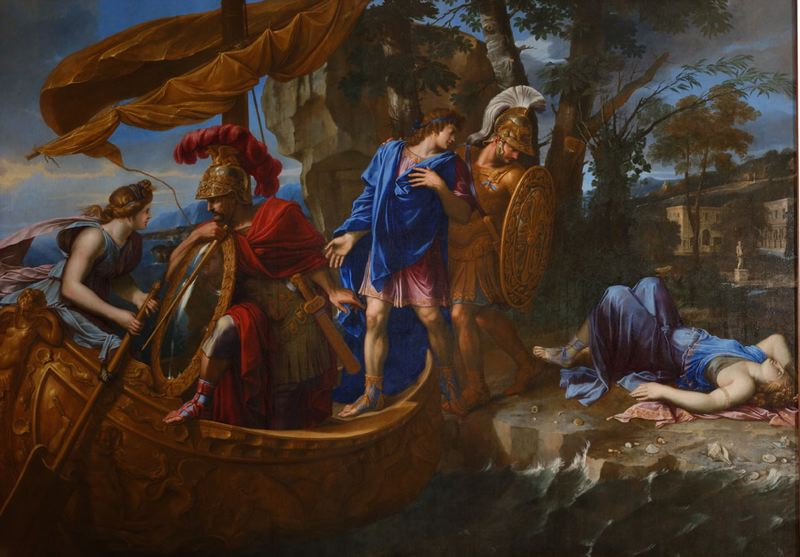
Renaud abandonnant Armide
