= François Barois =

French sculptor

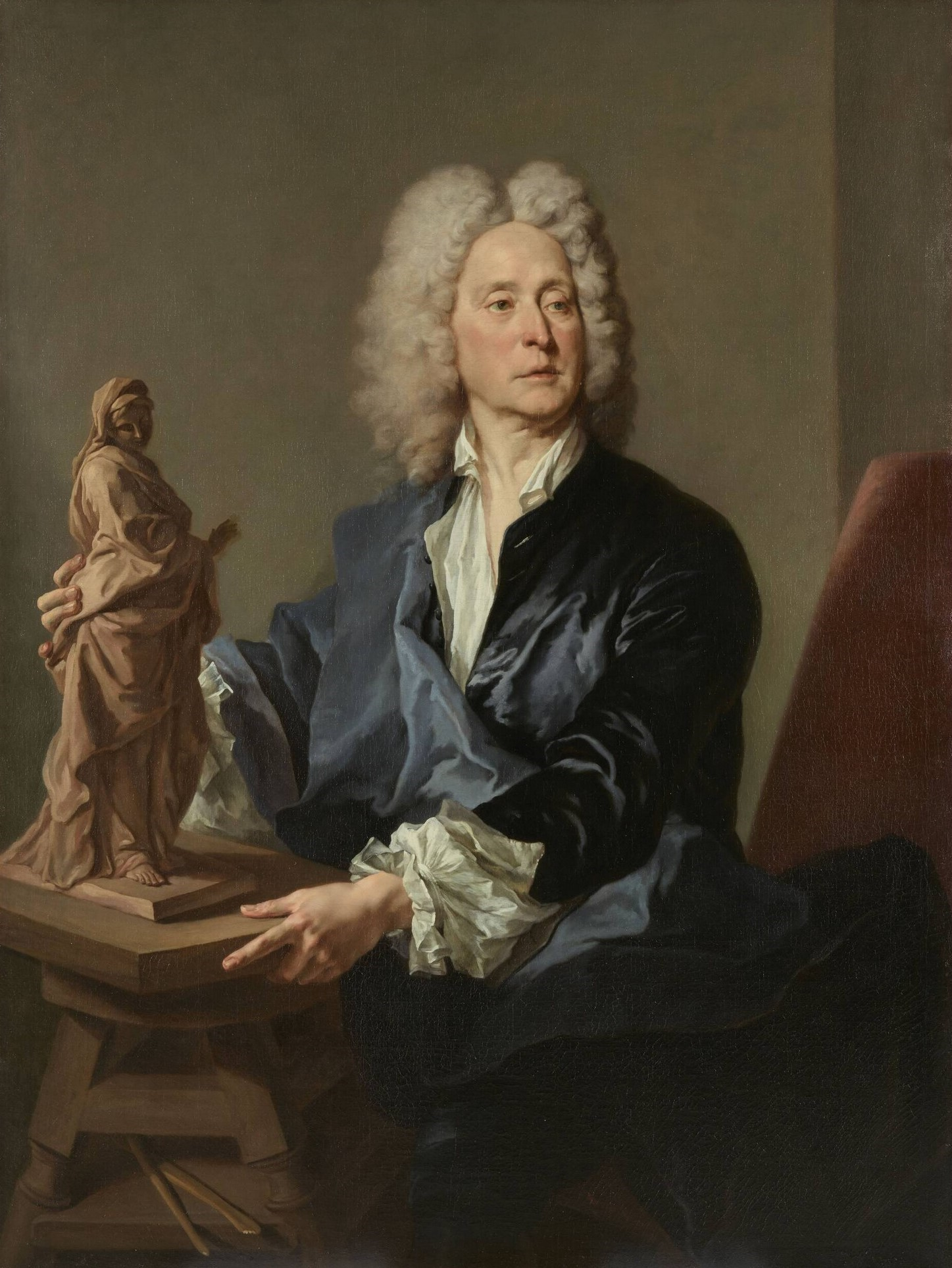
Portrait by Charles-Étienne Geuslain, 1723

François Barois (1656–1726) was a French sculptor.

Barois was born and died in Paris. While residing at the French Academy in Rome he produced a copy of the Kallipygian Venus for King Louis XIV, working on it from 1683 to 1686. His Cleopatra Dying was his reception piece for the Académie royale de peinture et de sculpture in 1700; it is now in the Musée du Louvre. Three more of his works are also now at the Louvre: Spring and Authumn (therm figures) and Pomona.

Barois was among the large team of sculptors delivering decorative vases and other sculptural elements for the gardens of Versailles.

== Selected works ==
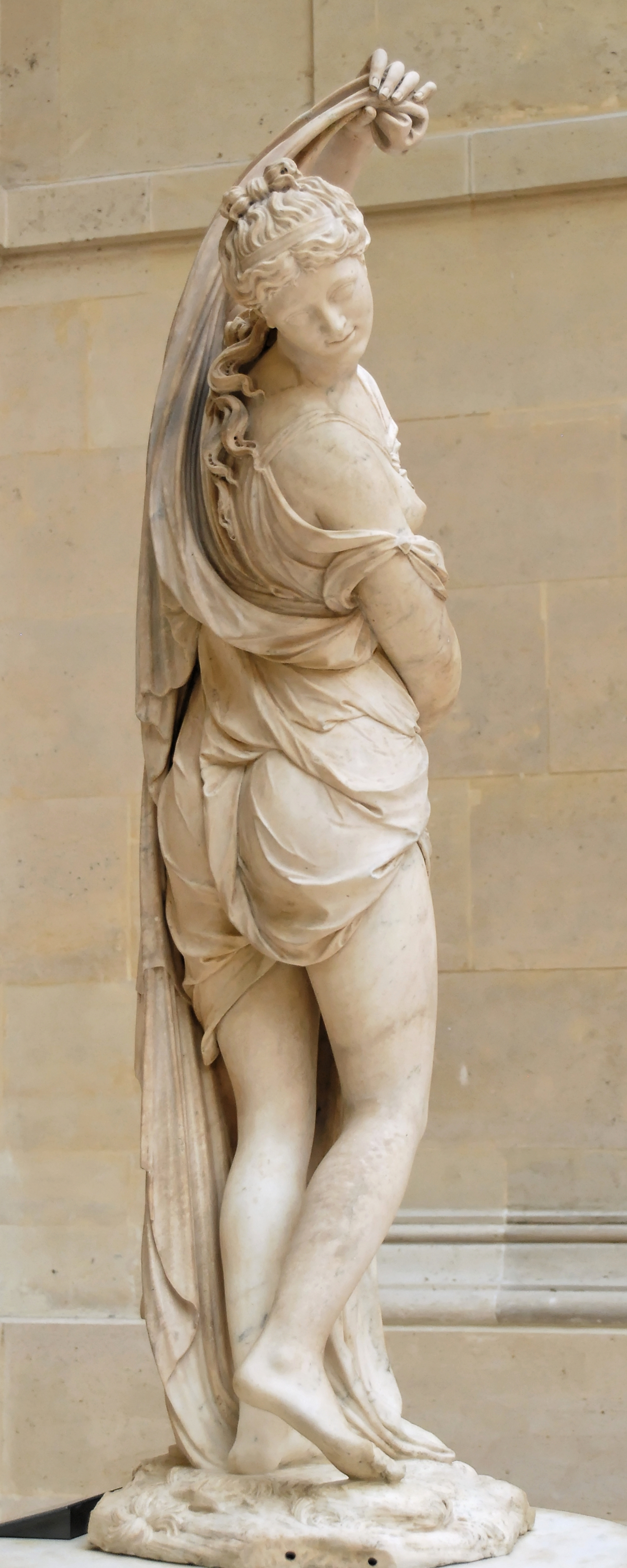
Callipygian Venus (1683-1686)

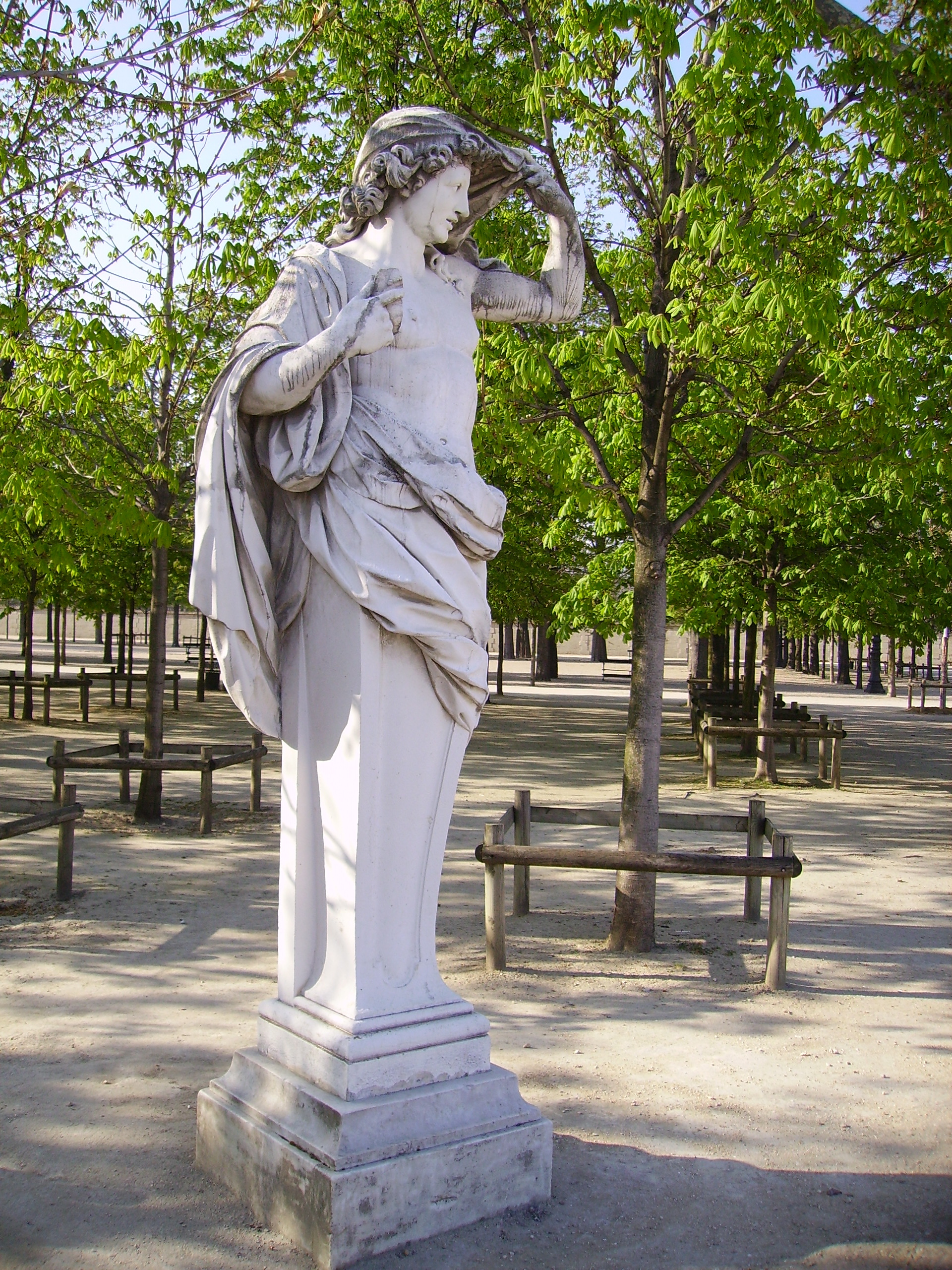
Autumn (1696)

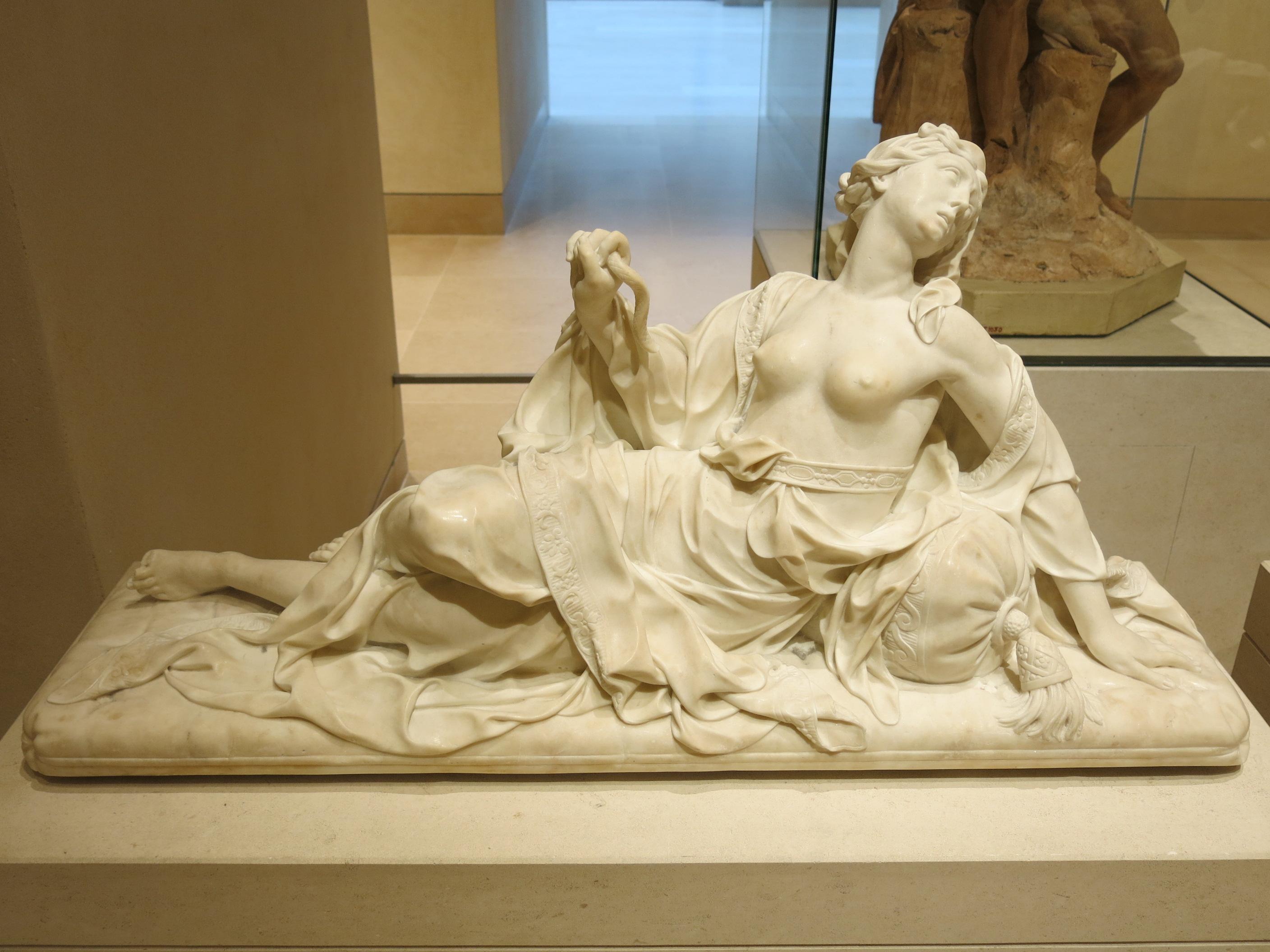
Dying Cleopatra (1700)

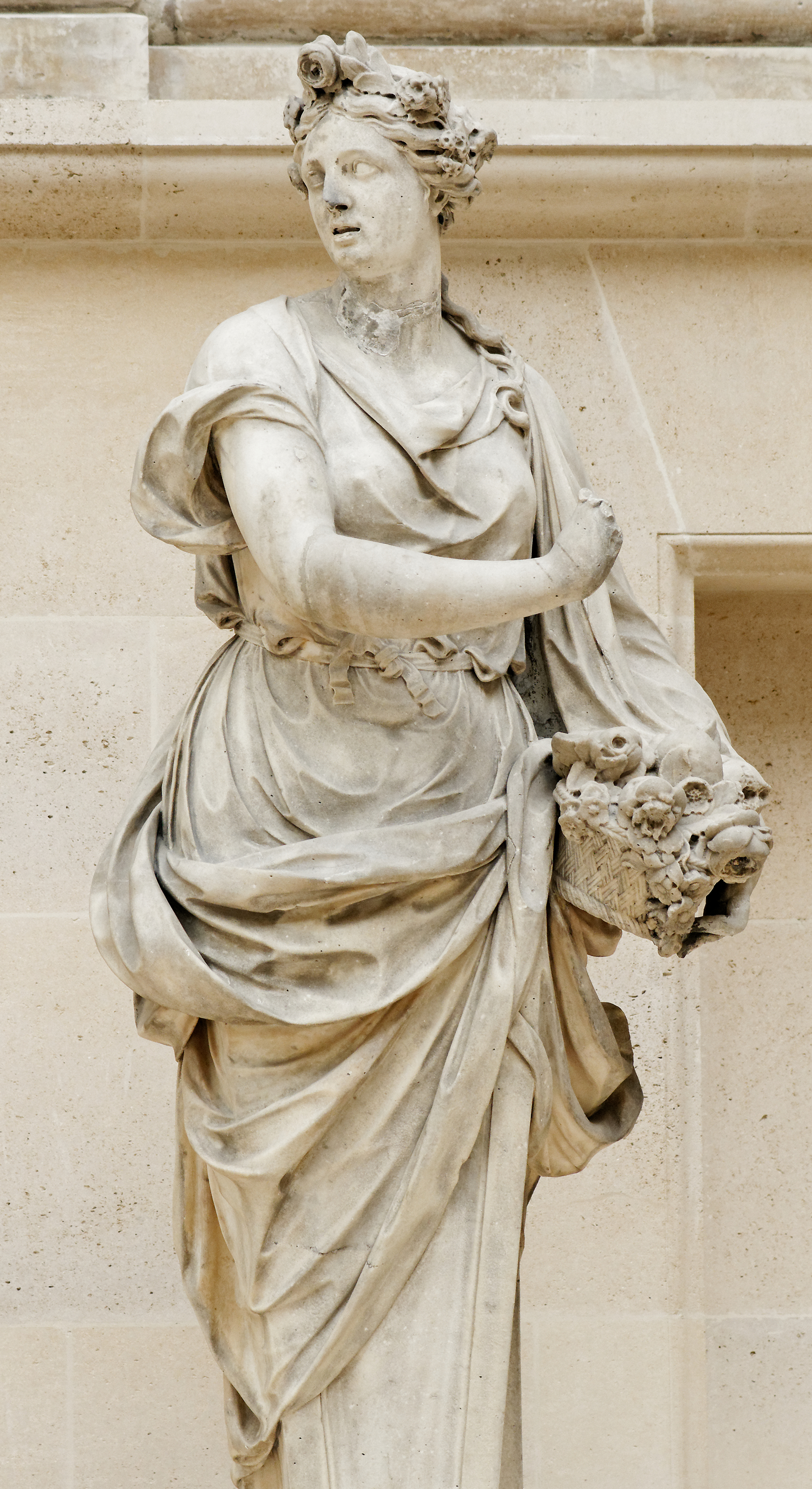
Pomona

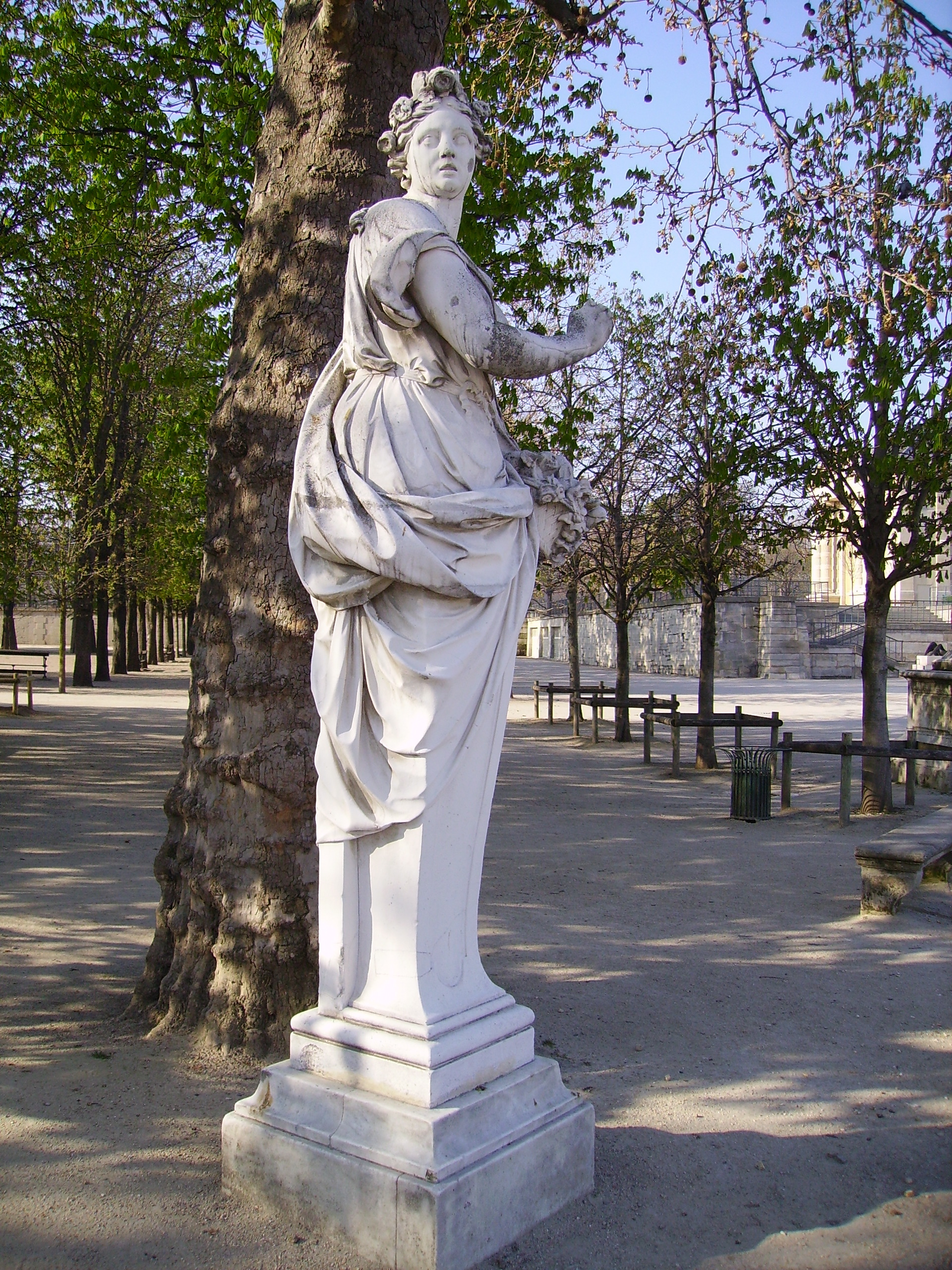
Spring

The Lamentation of Christ by François Barois, c. 1700, Louvre Museum
