= Jean-Jacques Clérion =

French sculptor

Jean-Jacques Clérion (16 April 1637 – 28 April 1714) was a French sculptor who worked mainly for King Louis XIV.

Clérion was born in either Aix-en-Provence or Trets. For much of his career he worked on the Chateau de Versailles, including many of the famous garden sculptures, such as the "Apollo Fountain". His admission piece to the Académie française, a 1689 bas relief of Saint James the Less, may be seen in the Louvre. He also produced a copy of the Kallipygian Venus for Louis XIV's Palace of Versailles in 1686, and a copy of the Medici Venus which may be seen at the Château de Menars. He died in Paris.

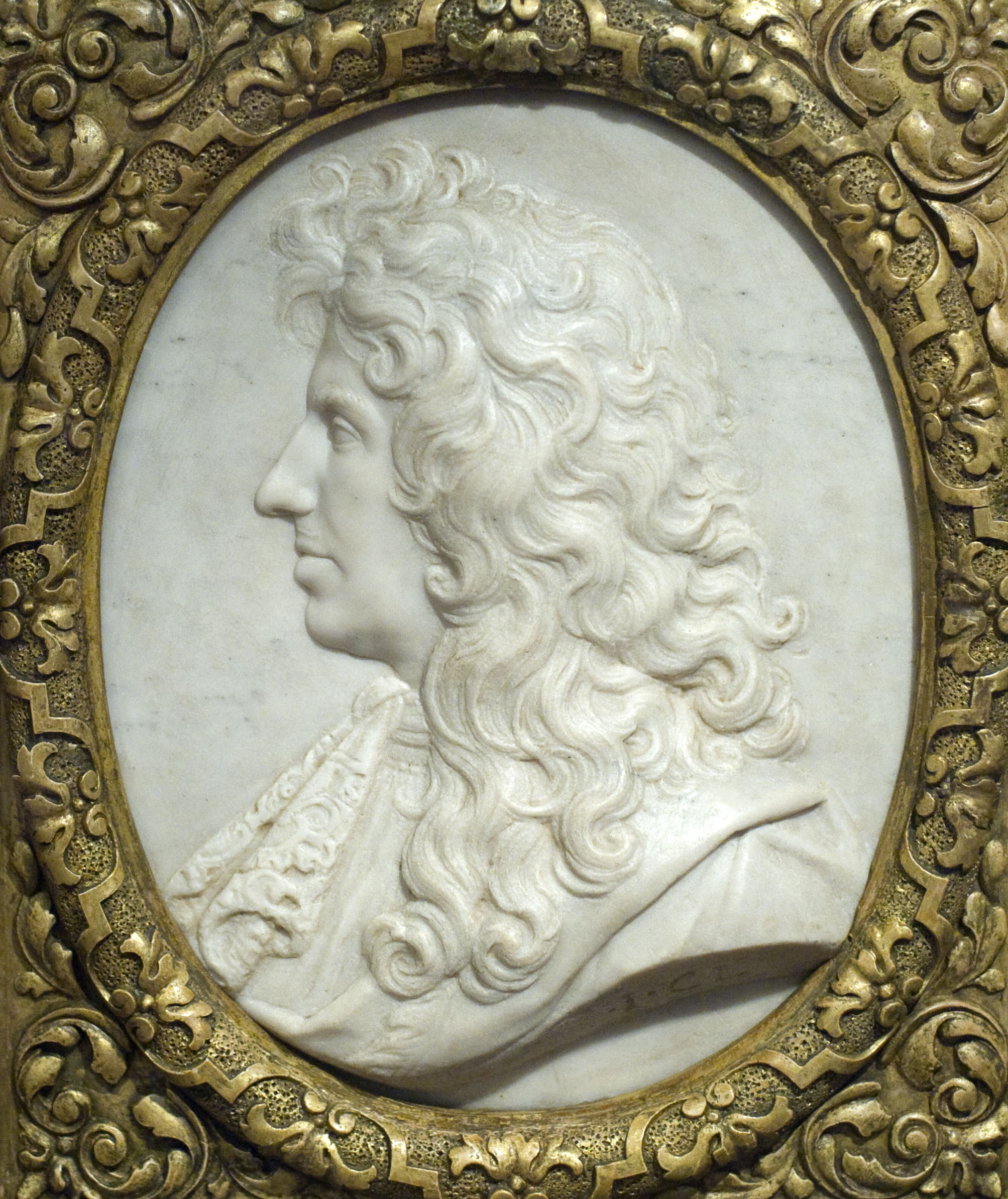
Christiaan Huygens, relief by Jean-Jacques Clérion, c. 1670.
