= Charles Errard the Elder =

Charles Errard the Elder (1570–1628) was a French painter. He also served as painter-in-ordinary to the French king and designer of fortifications in Brittany. He is also notable as father of Charles Errard the Younger, also an artist.

== Life ==
Born in Bressuire, he was a son of Hector Errard (c. 1538–1611) and Claudon Mouzin (or Mangin). Hector was a brother of Jean Errard of Bar-le-Duc. Charles trained under François Bunel. He moved to Nantes after the submission of the duc de Mercœur, in 1598, and married Jeanne Cremé. The couple had at least three children – Paul, Anne (who married Jérôme Bachot), and Charles the Younger (1606–1689).

He was presented to Louis XIII in 1614 on his journey to Nantes, but as a Calvinist he could not be given a public job. Shortly afterwards he converted to Catholicism and on 1 March 1615 the king made him designer of the repairs and fortifications in the towns of Brittany, replacing Jean Guilbaud at an annual wage of 500 livres. In 1621 he was replaced in that role by his son-in-law Jérôme Bachot and instead became painter-in-ordinary to the king, moving to Paris, where he gained the patronage of cardinal de Richelieu and was also made architect-in-ordinary to the king.

According to Frédéric Villot, cited by Auguste Jal, on his way to Rome Claude Lorrain met Charles Errard the Younger with his father and his brother Paul in Marseille. It is unknown when Charles Errard the Elder returned to France, but he died in Nantes.

== Works ==
Almost no works by him survive.
