= Jean Errard =

French mathematician and military engineer

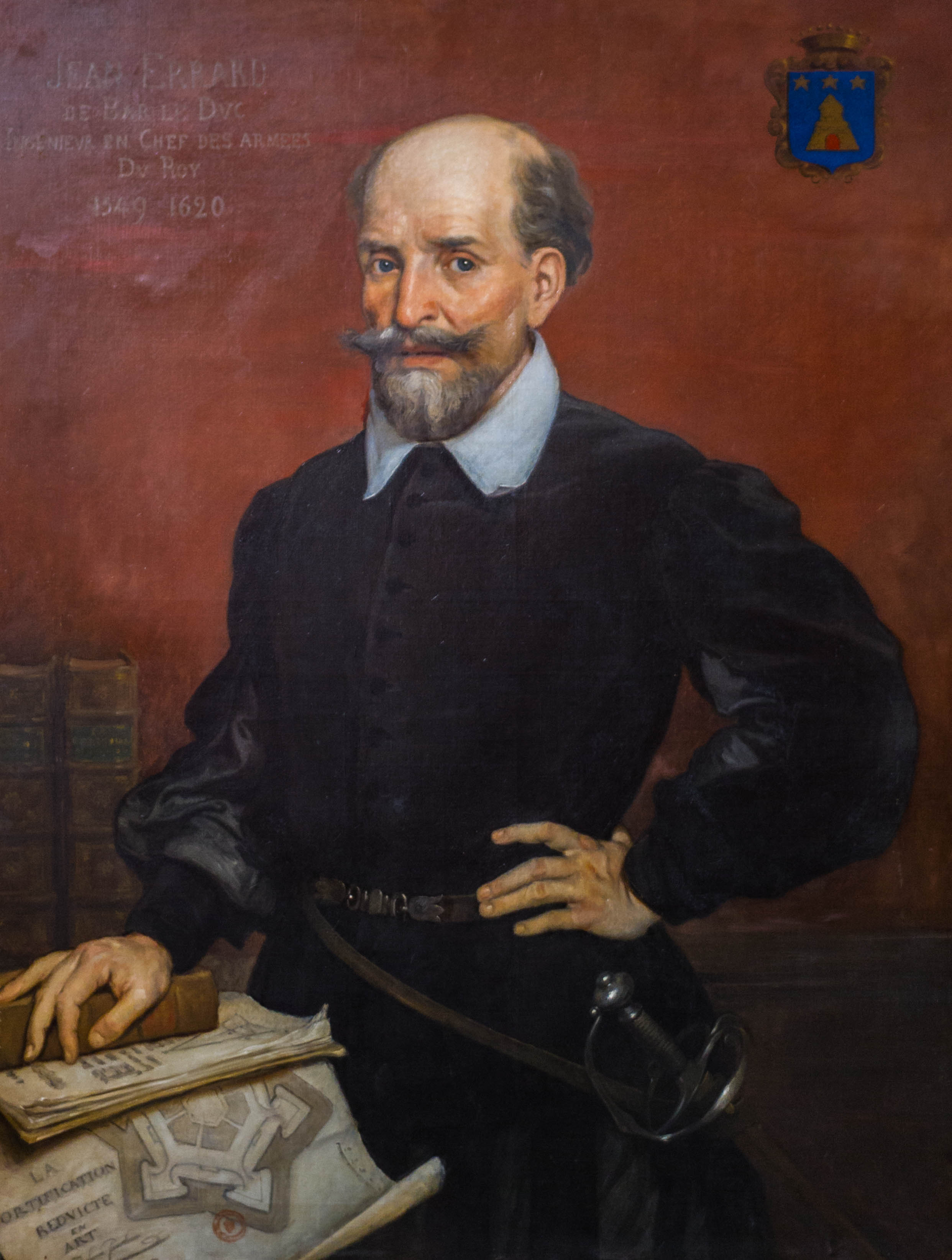

Jean Errard or Errard de Bar-le-Duc (c. 1554 - 20 July 1610) was a mathematician and military engineer, initially in the service of the ducal court of Lorraine and then (after converting from Protestantism to Catholicism) of Henry IV of France. He introduced Italian bastions to France and was a forerunner of Vauban as well as uncle to the painter Charles Errard the Elder. He has been called the "father of French fortification".

== Life ==
=== Youth and education ===
Born in Bar-le-Duc to a notable family, he became a Protestant by 1572 at the latest, attending the French Reformed Church in Heidelberg, though he still served the Catholic Charles III de Lorraine. He joined the University of Heidelberg in 1573, taking refuge in the Palatinate of the Rhine since Protestanism was banned in the duchies of Bar and Lorraine.

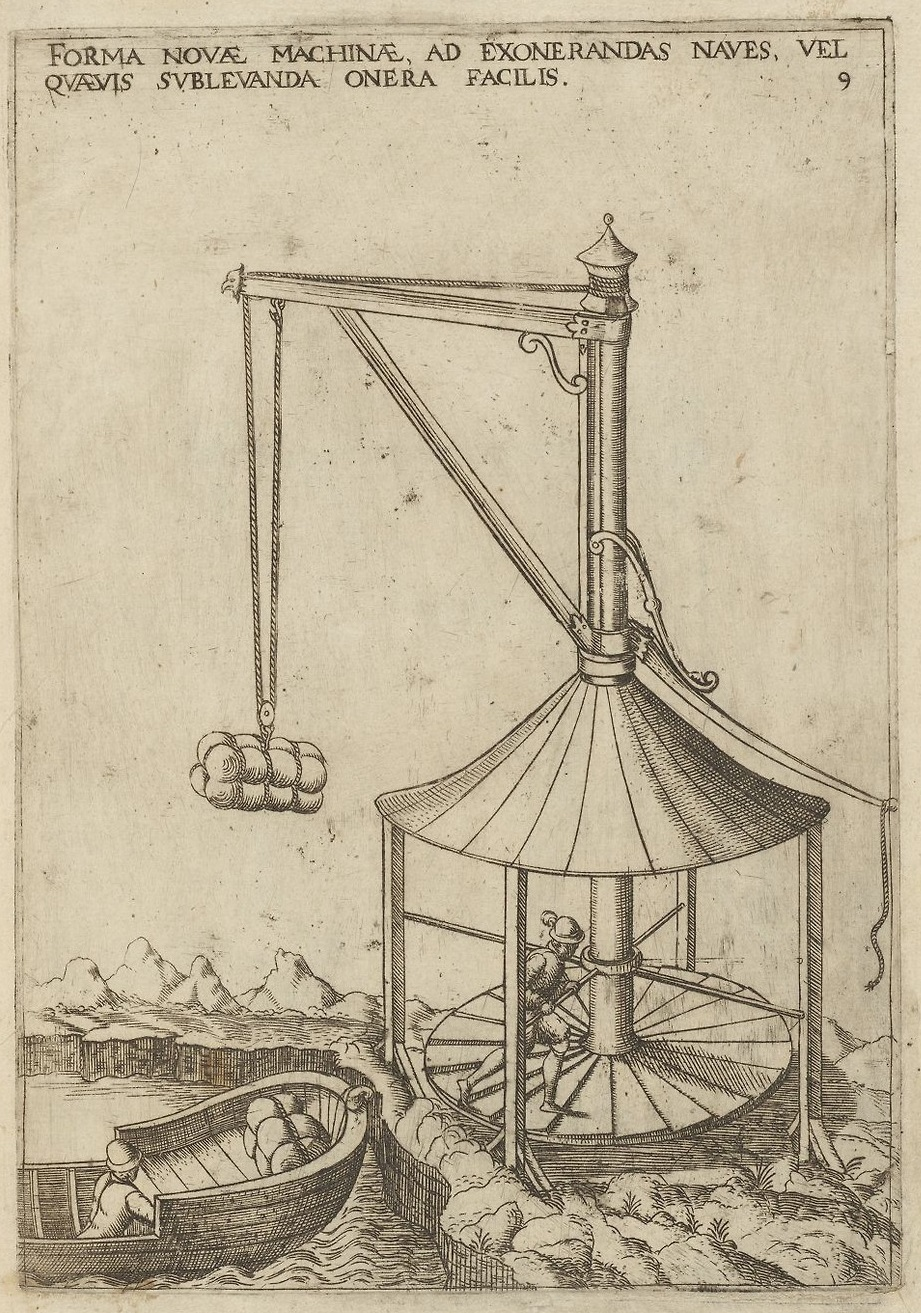
Instruments mathematiques mechaniques, 1584

A good student of mathematics and geometry, he entered Charles' service in 1580 and at the start of that decade moved to Lorraine and married Barbe de Rains (or Reims), daughter of a counsellor to the chamber of accounts of Bar. He dedicated Premier livre des instruments mathématiques (Nancy, 1584) to Charles, who had funded its publication. He also produced the first livre des instruments mathématiques mécaniques.

== Designs ==
=== Fortifications ===
- Abbeville,
- Citadel of Amiens,
- Antibes,
- Bayonne,
- Beauvais,
- Calais,
- Citadel at Doullens,
- Laon,
- parts of the ramparts and citadel at Montreuil-sur-Mer,
- Citadel of Sisteron,
- Saint-Tropez,
- Underground citadel of Verdun
