= Pierre-Jean Rémy =

French writer and diplomat

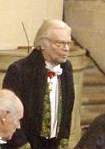
- Born: Jean-Pierre Angremy; 21 March 1937; Angoulême, France
- Died: 28 April 2010 (aged 73); Paris, France
- Occupation(s): Novelist; Essayist

Pierre-Jean Rémy is the pen-name of Jean-Pierre Angremy (21 March 1937 – 28 April 2010) who was a French diplomat, novelist, and essayist. He was elected to the Académie française on 16 June 1988, and won the 1986 Grand Prix du roman de l'Académie française for his novel Une ville immortelle.

== Biography ==
Rémy was born in Angoulême, Charente, where he received his primary and secondary education. His studies at Lycée Condorcet were steeped in Latin, Greek, and literature.

Beginning in 1955, Rémy studied in Paris at the Institute of Political Studies (Institut d'études politiques), the Faculty of Law (Faculté de droit) of the University of Paris (licence-economic science), and the Sorbonne (sociology). As a Fulbright program scholar, Rémy served as an assistant to the sociologist Herbert Marcuse at Brandeis University in Massachusetts from 1958-59 before returning to Paris to finish his studies at the École nationale d'administration (ENA) in 1963 (class of "Saint-Just").

== Bibliography ==
- 1962 Et Gulliver mourut de sommeil
- 1963 Midi ou l’Attentat
- 1971 Le Sac du Palais d'Été (Gallimard)
- 1972 Urbanisme (Gallimard)
- 1973 Les Suicidés du printemps
- 1973 Une mort sale (Gallimard)
- 1973 La vie d'Adrian Putney, poète (Gallimard)
- 1974 Ava (Gallimard)
- 1974 Mémoires secrets pour servir à l'histoire de ce siècle (Gallimard)
- 1974 La Mort de Floria Tosca (Gallimard)
- 1975 Rêver la vie (Gallimard)
- 1976 La Figure dans la pierre (Gallimard)
- 1977 Les Enfants du Parc (Gallimard)
- 1977 Si j’étais romancier
- 1978 Callas, une vie
- 1978 Les Nouvelles Aventures du chevalier de la Barre (Gallimard)
- 1979 Cordelia, ou l'Angleterre (Gallimard)
- 1979 Orient-Express I (Albin Michel)
- 1979 Don Giovanni, Mozart, Losey (Albin Michel)
- 1979 La Petite Comtesse
- 1980 Salue pour moi le Monde (Gallimard)
- 1980 Pandora (Albin Michel)
- 1981 Un voyage d'hiver (Gallimard)
- 1982 Don Juan (Albin Michel)
- 1983 Le Dernier Été (Flammarion)
- 1983 Mata Hari
- 1984 Comédies italiennes (Flammarion)
- 1984 Orient-Express II
- 1985 La vie d’un héros (Albin Michel)
- 1985 Le Vicomte épinglé (Gallimard)
- 1986 Une ville immortelle (Albin Michel), Grand Prix du roman de l'Académie française
- 1987 Des châteaux en Allemagne (Flammarion)
- 1988 Annette, ou l’éducation des filles (Albin Michel)
- 1989 Bastille, rêver un Opéra. (Plon)
- 1989 Toscanes (Albin Michel)
- 1990 Chine (Albin Michel)
- 1991 De la photographie considérée comme un assassinat (Albin Michel)
- 1991 L’Autre Éducation sentimentale (Odile Jacob)
- 1991 Pays d’âge, poèmes
- 1992 Algérie, bords de Seine (Albin Michel)
- 1993 Qui trop embrasse (Albin Michel)
- 1994 Un cimetière rouge en Nouvelle-Angleterre
- 1994 Londres, un ABC romanesque et sentimental (Jean-Claude Lattès)
- 1995 Désir d’Europe
- 1997 Le Rose et le Blanc
- 1997 Retour d'Hélène (Gallimard)
- 1997 Mes grands bordeaux
- 1998 Aria di Roma (Albin Michel)
- 1999 La Nuit de Ferrare (Albin Michel)
- 2000 Demi-siècle (Albin Michel)
- 2001 État de grâce. Dire perdu. Trésors et secrets du Quai d'Orsay
- 2002 Berlioz (Albin Michel)
- 2002 Les Belles du Moulin Rouge (Le Cherche-Midi)
- 2004 Dictionnaire amoureux de l'Opéra (Plon)
- 2004 Chambre noire à Pékin (Albin Michel)
