= Noël Coypel =

French painter (1628–1707)

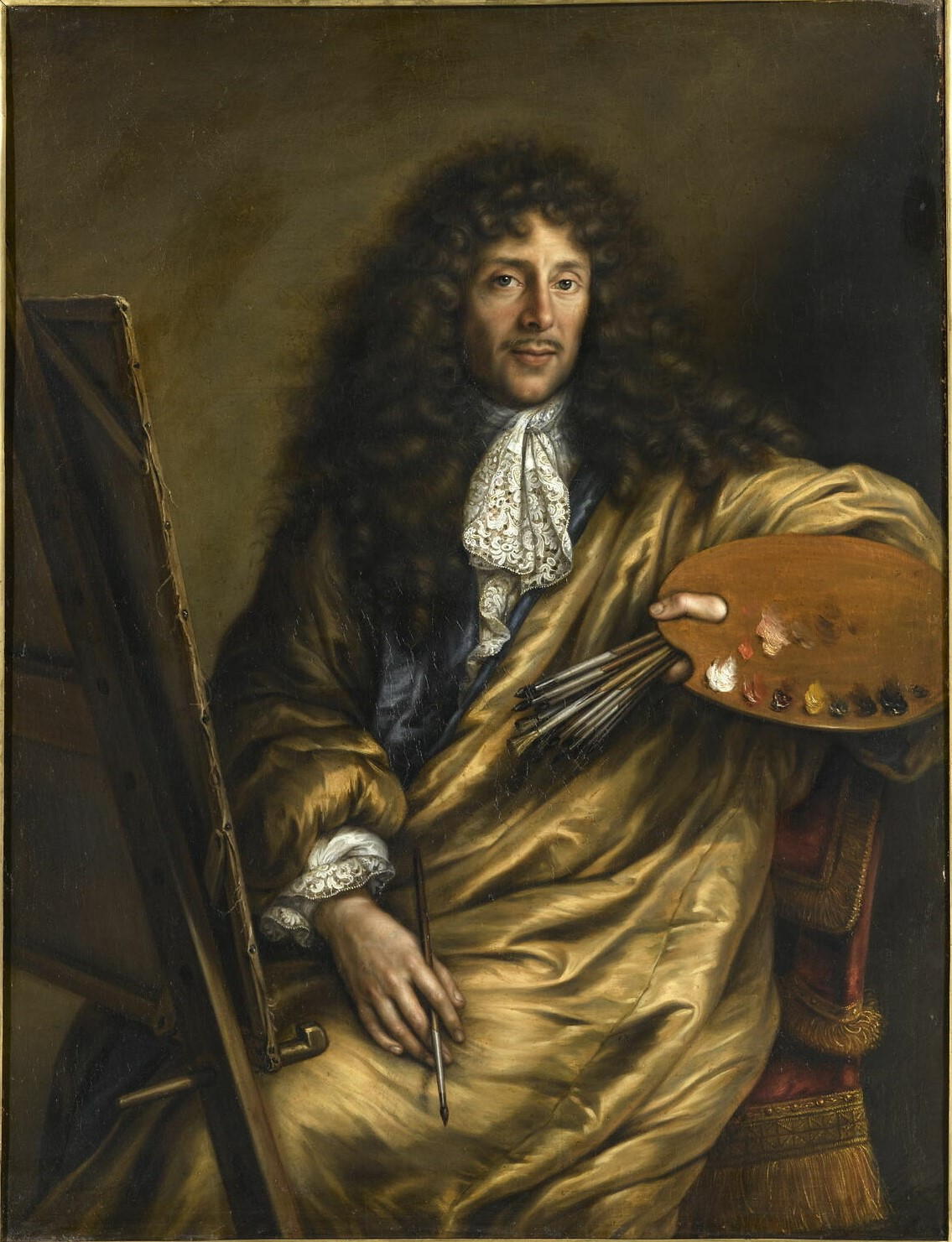
- Portrait of Coypel from 1677 by Academy member Florent de La Mare-Richart
- Born: 25 December 1628; Paris, France
- Died: 24 December 1707 (aged 78); Paris, France
- Children: Antoine Coypel; Noël-Nicolas Coypel

Director of The French Academy in Rome
- In office 1673–1675
- Preceded by: Charles Errard
- Succeeded by: Charles Errard

Director of the Académie de Peinture et de Sculpture
- In office 1695–1699
- Monarch: Louis XIV
- Preceded by: Pierre Mignard
- Succeeded by: Charles de La Fosse

Noël Coypel (French pronunciation: [nɔɛl kwapɛl]; 25 December 1628 – 24 December 1707) was a French painter, and was also called Coypel le Poussin, because he was heavily influenced by Poussin.

== Biography ==
His father, Guyon Coypel, was an unsuccessful artist, originally from Cherbourg. He began his studies in Orléans with an artist named Pierre Poncet, who had been a student of Simon Vouet. At the age of fourteen, he went to Paris. There, he found work in the studios of Noël Quillerier. His progress was rapid. In 1646, aged only eighteen, he was employed in preparing the decorations for the opera Orfeo by Luigi Rossi.

This attracted the attention of Charles Errard, who was responsible for the artwork at the Oratoire and the King's Bedroom at the Louvre, who engaged him to do some paintings. He would work exclusively on the orders of Louis XIV for almost twenty years, creating several paintings for the King's apartments and, following the King's marriage, the ceilings of the Queen's apartment. He also painted at the Tuileries and Fontainebleau.

In 1659, he married Madeleine Hérault (1641–1682), an art student. That same year, he presented himself at the Académie Royale de Peinture et de Sculpture but, due to the amount of work he was doing for the King, his official reception was postponed until early in 1663. Later that year, he displayed his reception piece, The Reprobation of Cain After the Death of Abel. He was named an assistant professor the following year, and became a full Professor a few months later.

He was appointed Director of the French Academy in Rome in 1672, succeeding his former mentor, Errard, who had served for the first six years of the Academy's existence. His son, Antoine, and his brother-in-law, the landscape painter Charles-Antoine Hérault, accompanied him. He held that office until 1675. During his administration, the Academy was finally established at the Palazzo Capranica. While there, he continued to produce paintings for the Royal Family and developed an enthusiasm for mythological themes. In 1673, he was admitted to the Académie de Saint-Luc.

Upon returning to Paris, he resumed his work for the King. In 1685, three years after his wife's death, he married Anne-Françoise Perrin (1665–1728), another young art student. They had fourteen children, most of whom died in infancy. A notable exception was their son, Noël-Nicolas Coypel, who also became a well-known painter.

The Marquis de Louvois and the Marquis de Villacerf engaged him to create some designs for the Gobelins Manufactory. In 1689, he was elected Deputy Rector for the Académie Royale. He was promoted to Rector in 1690, and to the Directorship in 1695, replacing the late Pierre Mignard. In 1702, he reassumed the position of Rector. Three years later, at the age of seventy-seven, he undertook a project to paint frescoes above the high altar at the Église des Invalides. This difficult work resulted in a long, serious illness that led to his death on Christmas Eve in 1707.

== Selected paintings ==
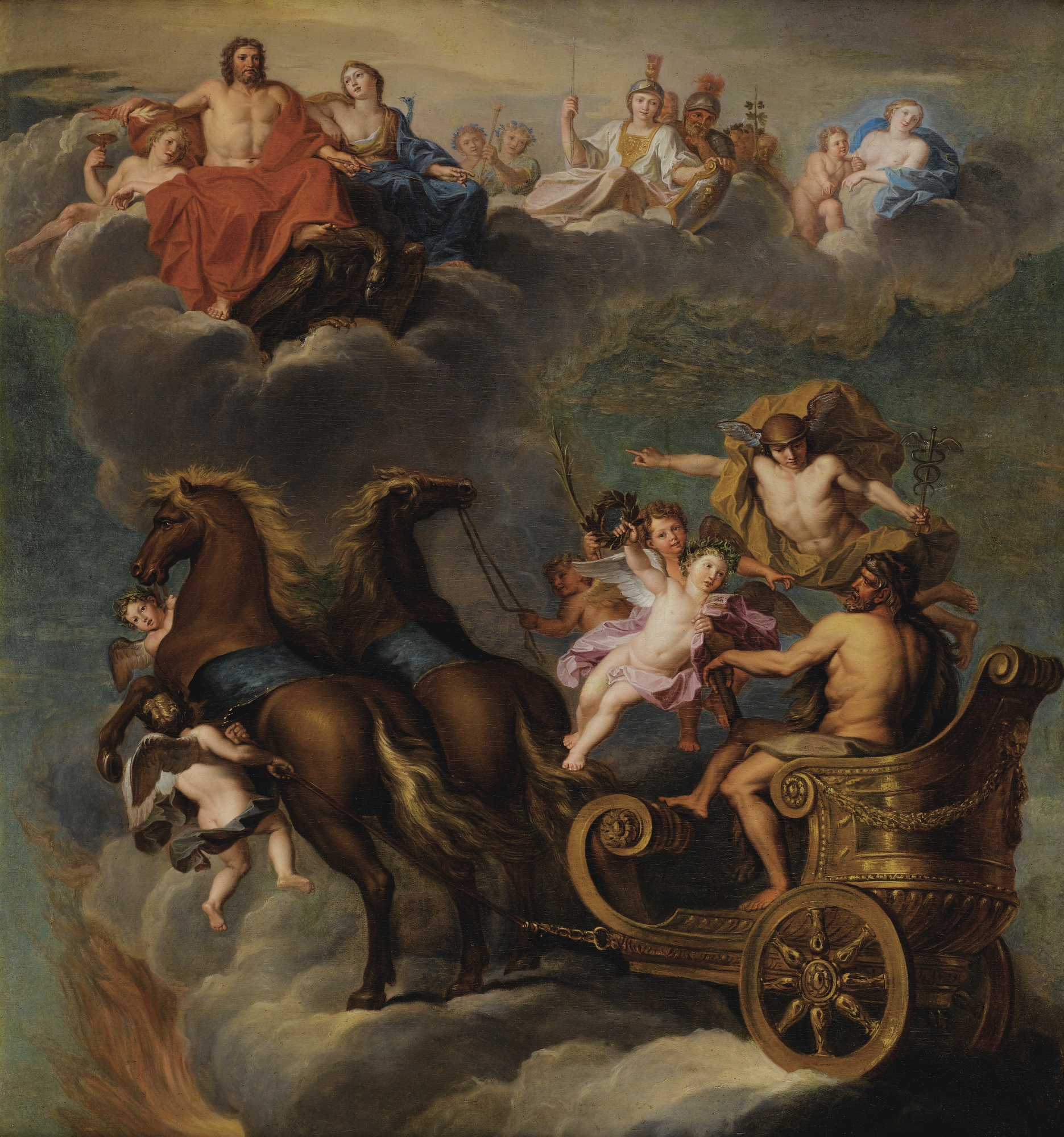
The Apotheosis of Hercules (1700)

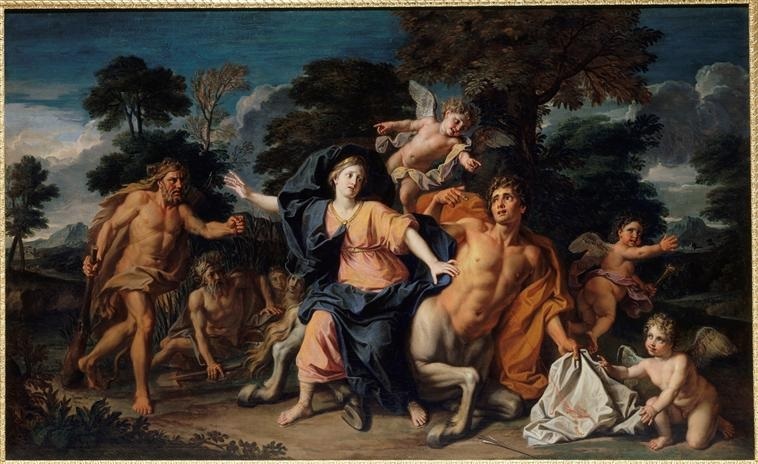
Hercules and Deianira

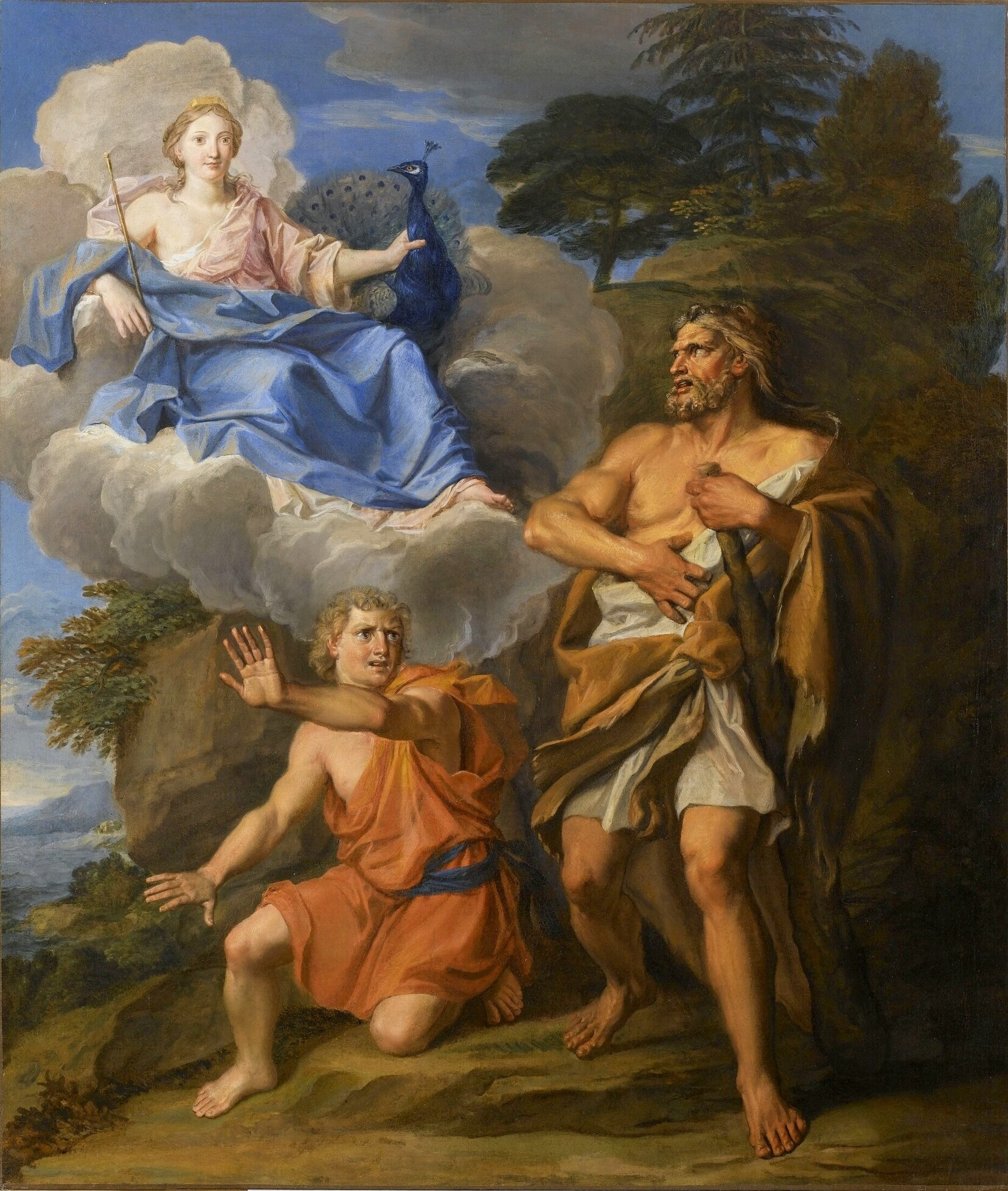
Juno and Hercules (1688)

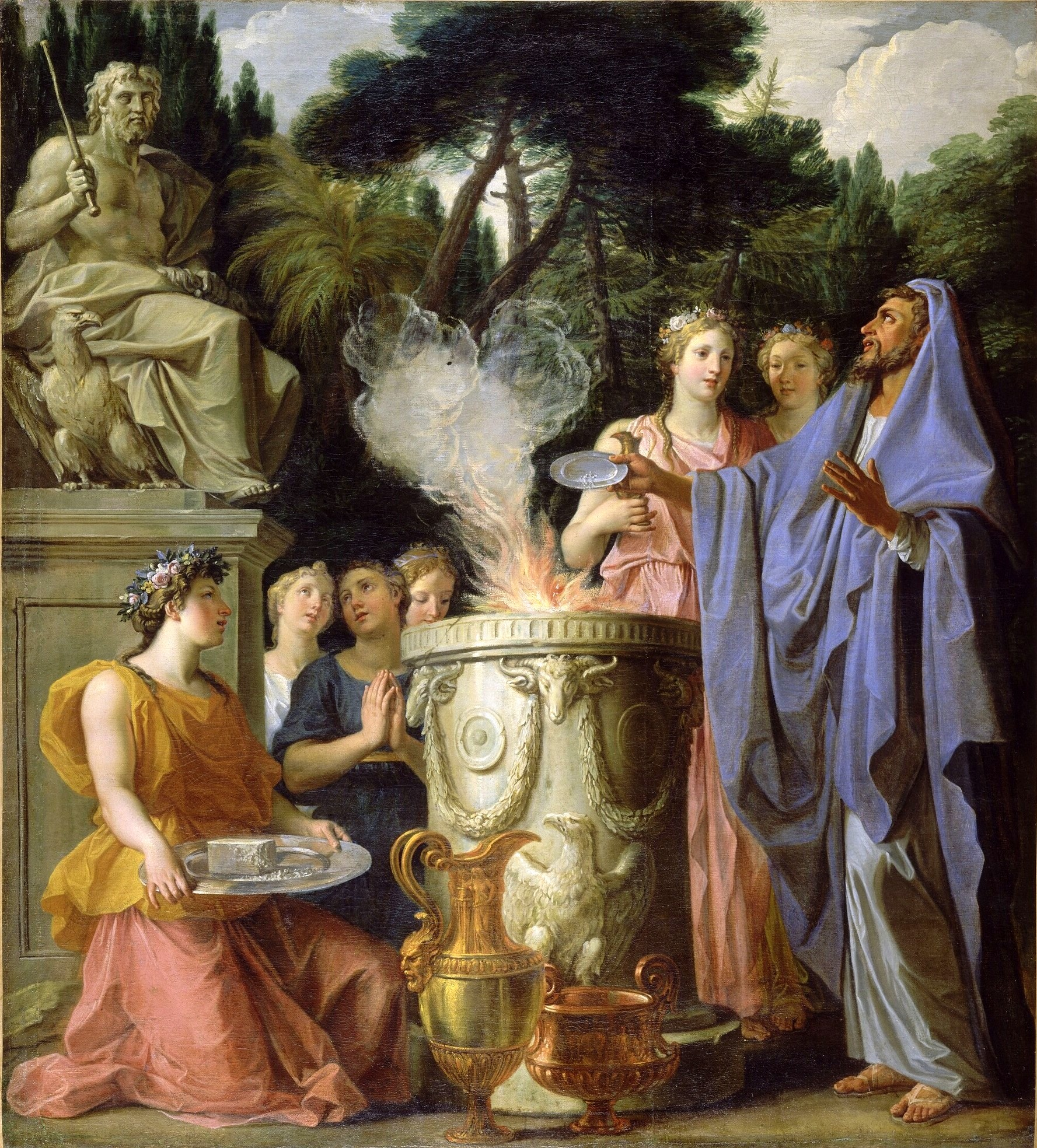
Sacrifice to Jupiter

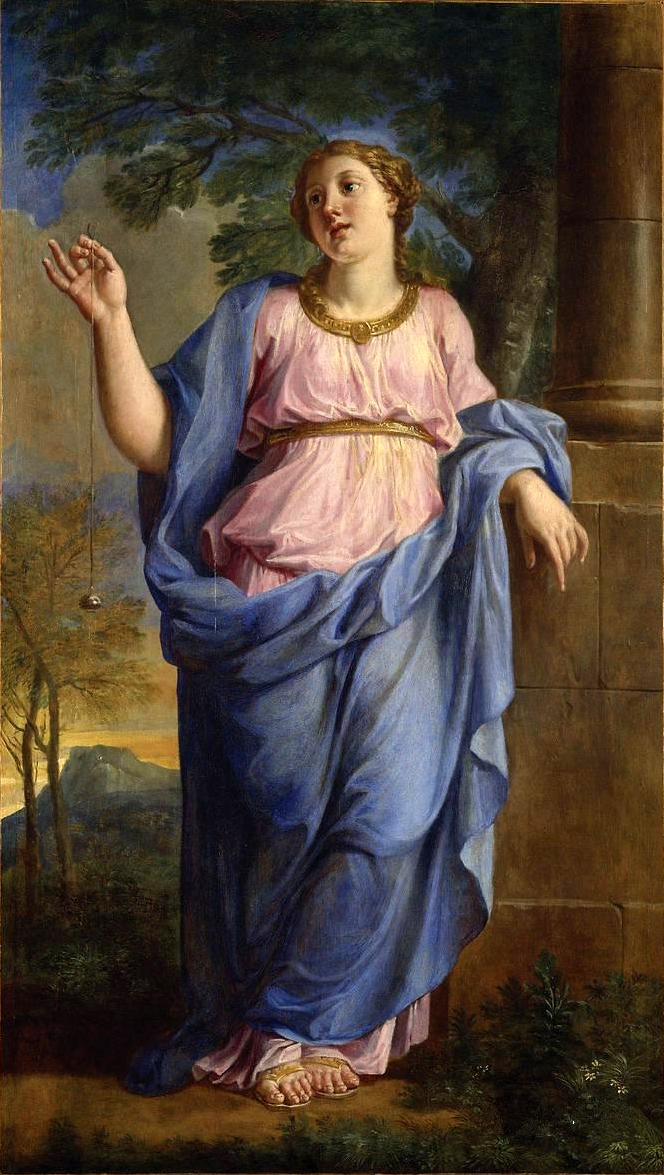
Equity (c. 1667)

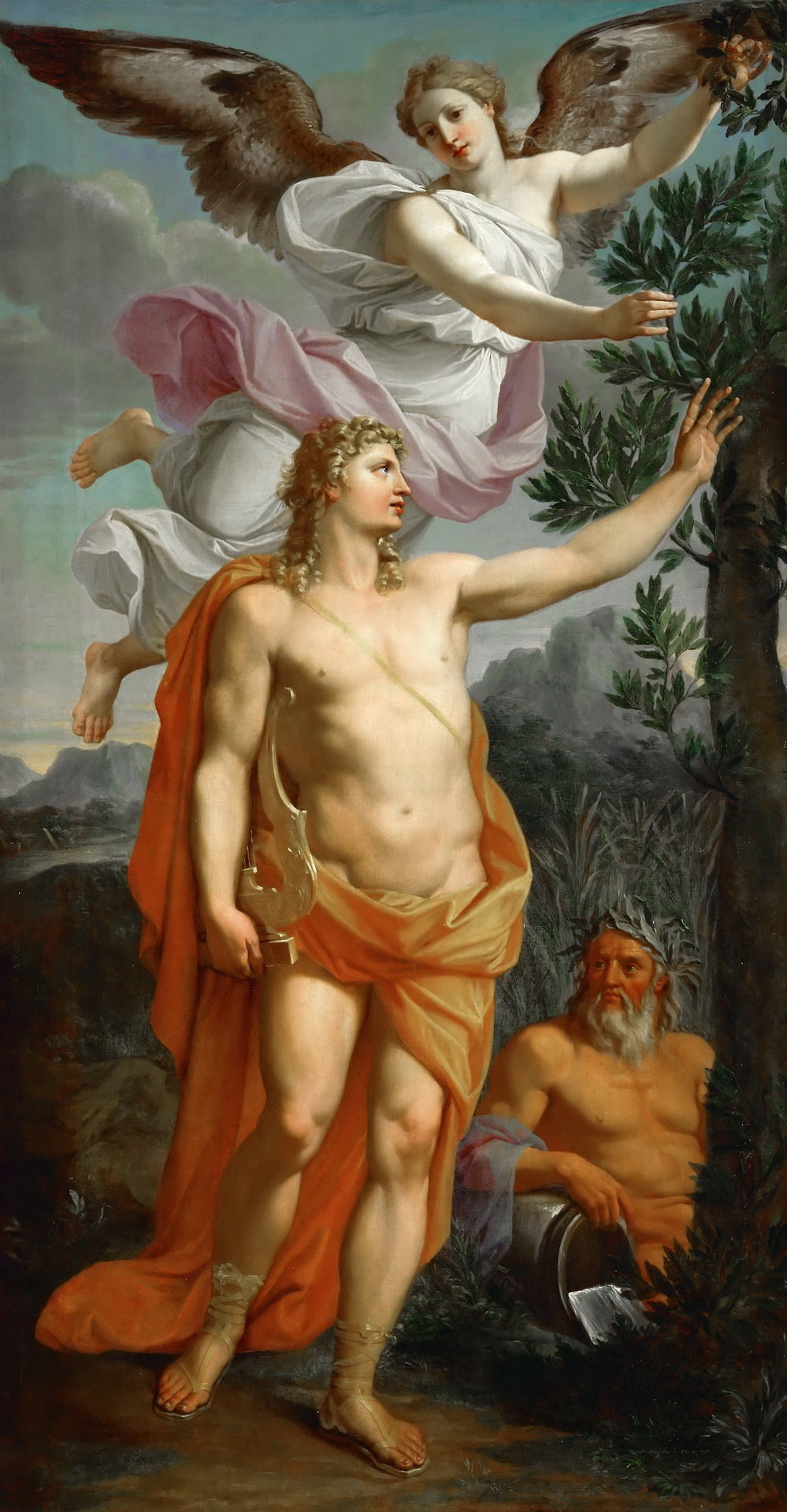
Apollo Crowned by Victory (c. 1667)

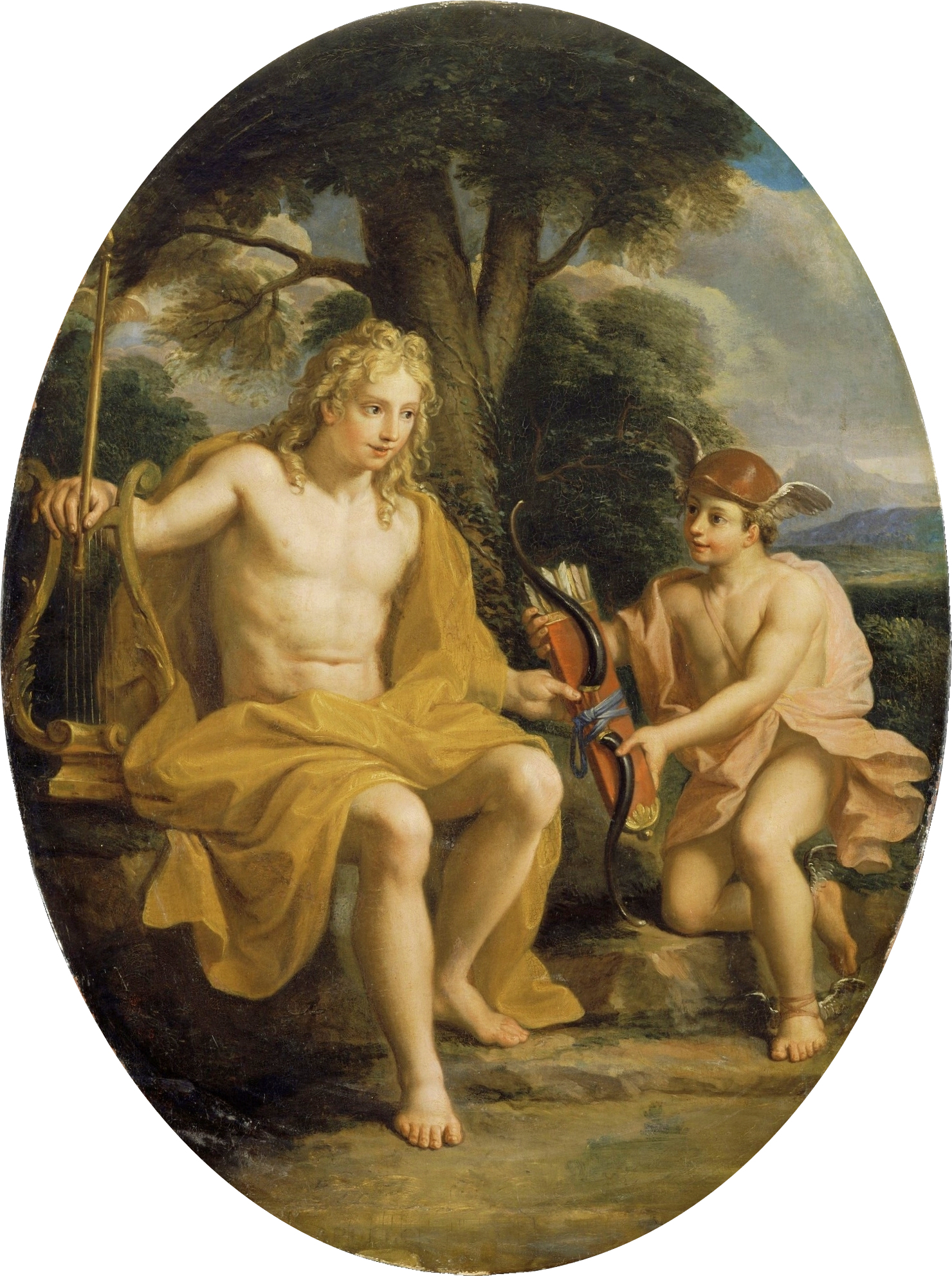
Apollo and Mercury (1688)

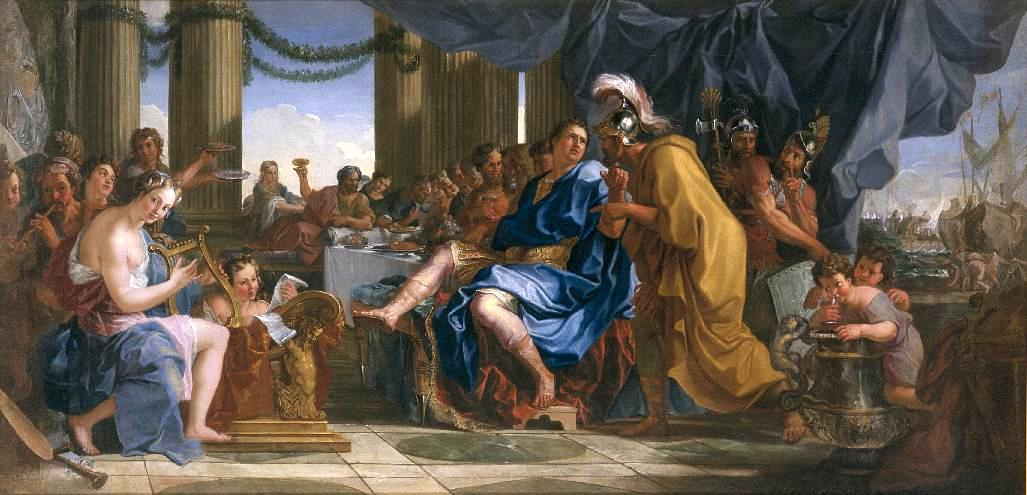
Nero Ordering the Murder of his Mother

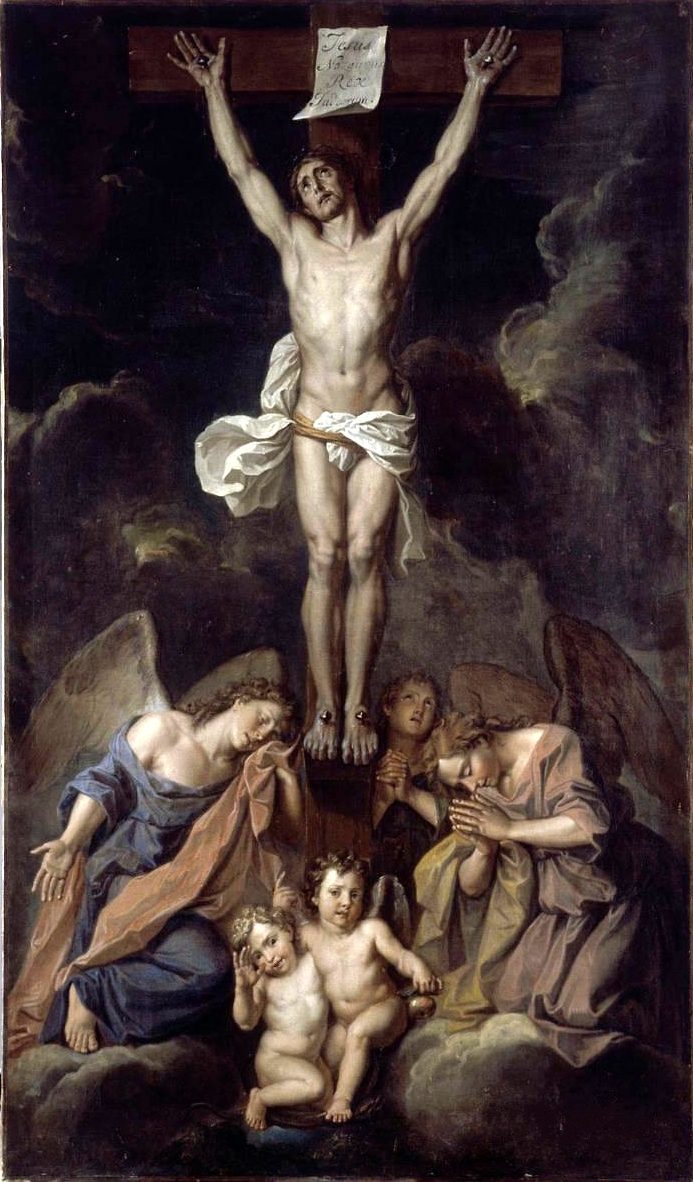
Christ on the Cross

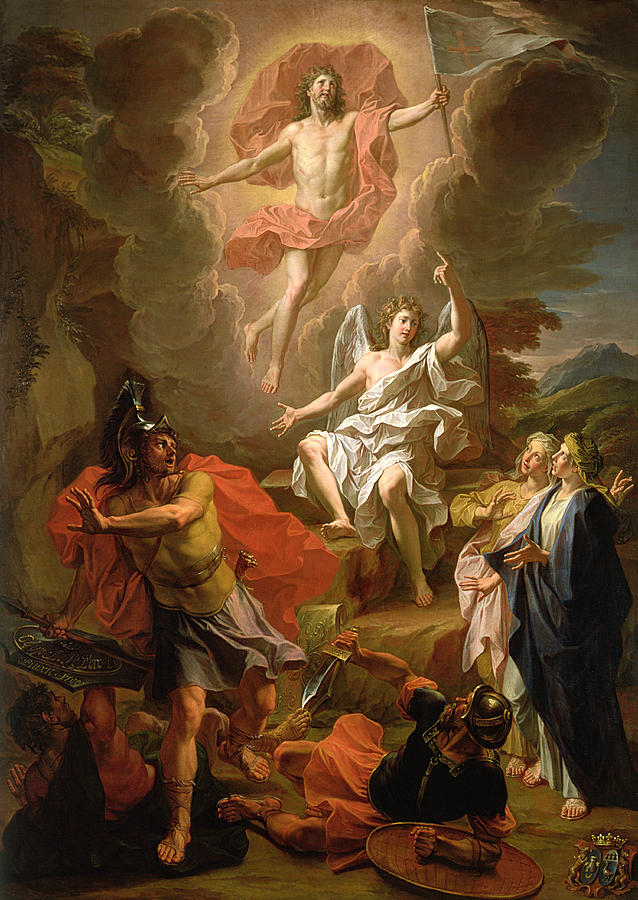
Resurrection of Christ
(c. 1700)

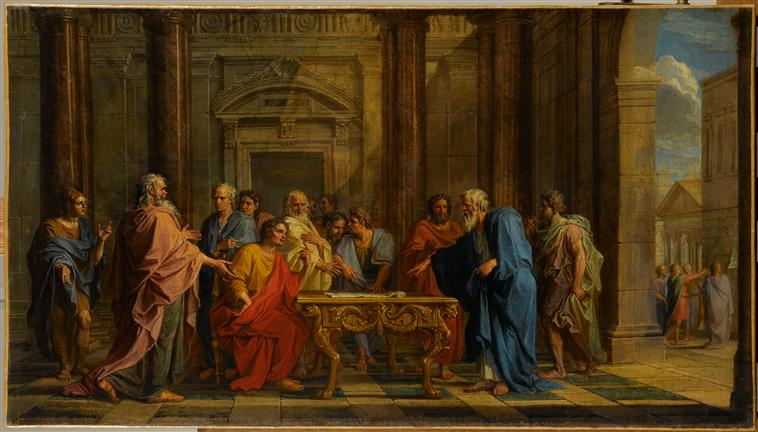
Solon Supporting Justice (c.1672)
