= French Academy in Rome =

Art school in Rome, Italy

Coordinates: 41°54′30″N 12°28′57″E

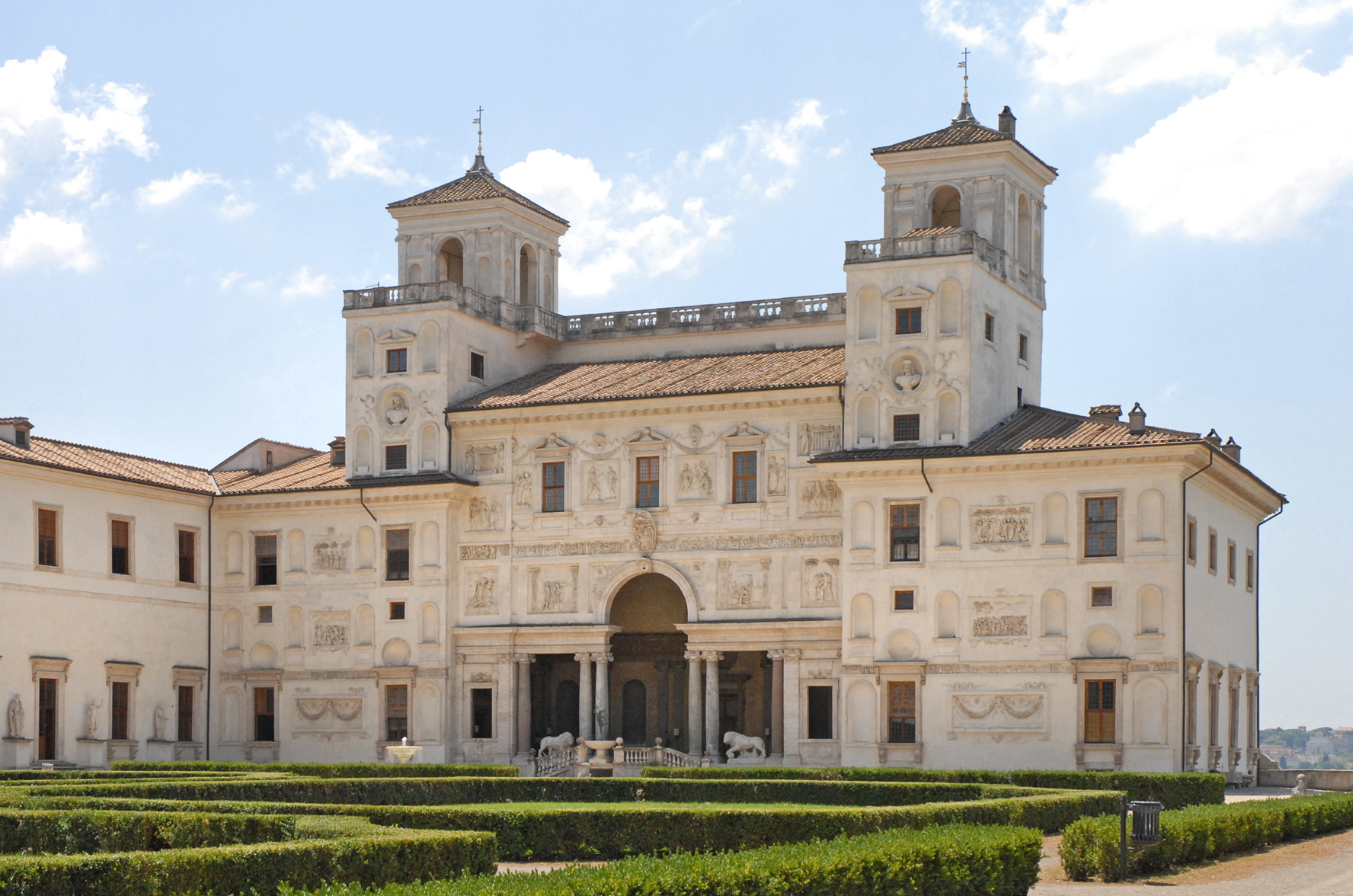
- The French Academy in Rome has been housed in the Villa Medici since 1804.
- Established: 1666
- Location: Rome, Italy
- Type: Academy
- President: Sam Stourdzé (2020–present)
- Website: Official website

The French Academy in Rome (French: Académie de France à Rome, pronounced [akademi də fʁɑ̃s a ʁɔm]) is an academy located in the Villa Medici, within the Villa Borghese, on the Pincio (Pincian Hill) in Rome, Italy.

== History ==
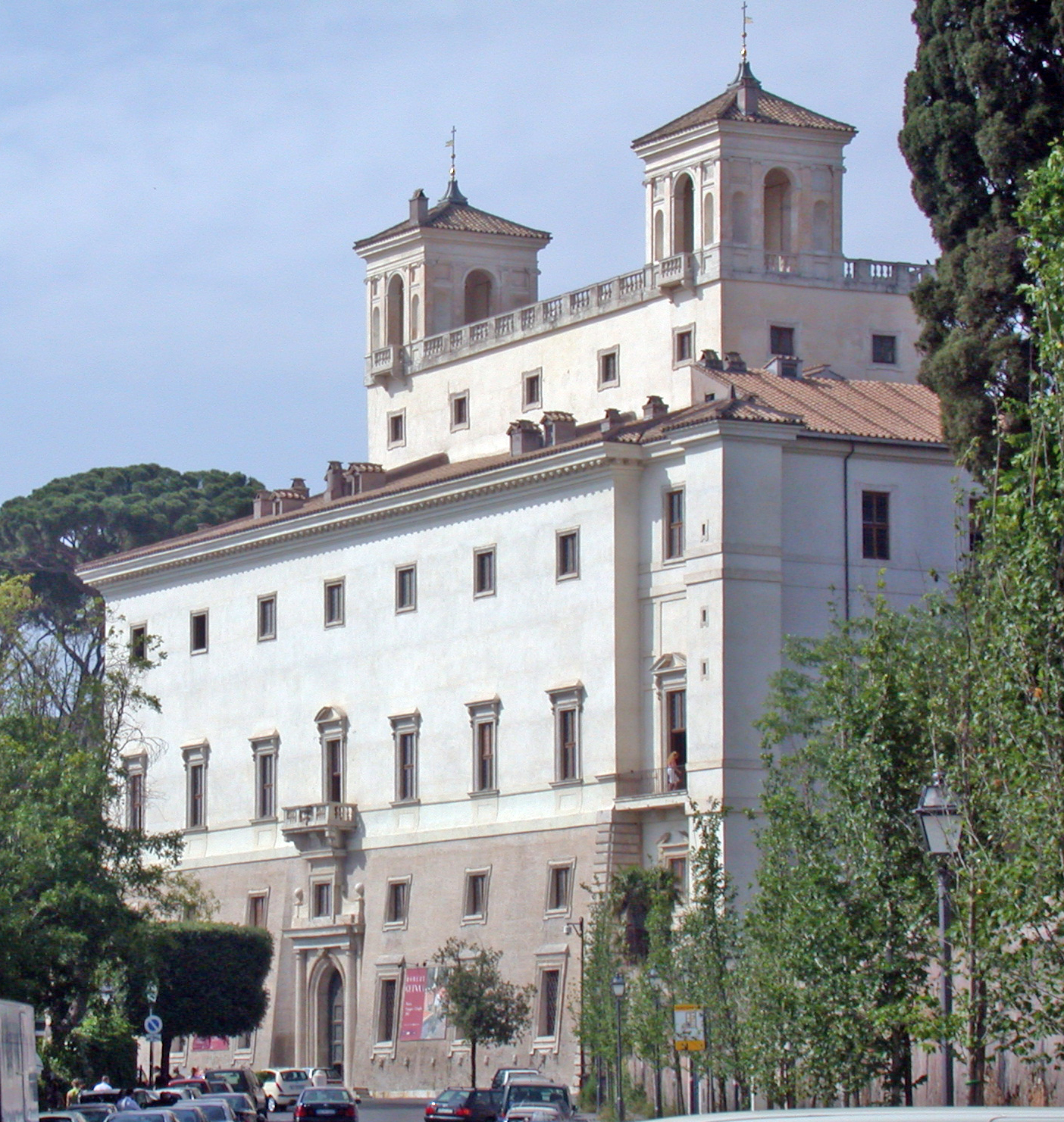
The French Academy seen from the Piazza Trinità dei Monti above the Spanish Steps

The Academy was founded at the Palazzo Capranica in 1666 by Louis XIV under the direction of Jean-Baptiste Colbert, Charles Le Brun and Gian Lorenzo Bernini. The Academy was from the 17th to 19th centuries the culmination of study for select French artists who, having won the prestigious Prix de Rome (Rome Prize), were honored with a 3, 4 or 5-year scholarship (depending on the art discipline they followed) in the Eternal City for the purpose of the study of art and architecture. Such scholars were and are known as pensionnaires de l'Académie (Academy pensioners). One recipient of the scholarship in the 17th century was Pierre Le Gros the Younger.

The Academy was housed in the Palazzo Capranica until 1737, and then in the Palazzo Mancini from 1737 to 1793. The Scottish artists Alexander Clerk, Allan Ramsay and Alexander Cunyngham enrolled as day students at the Academy during this period. In 1803 Napoleon Bonaparte moved it to the Villa Medici, with the intention of perpetuating an institution once threatened by the French Revolution and, thus, of retaining for young French artists the opportunity to see and copy the masterpieces of the Antiquity or the Renaissance and send back to Paris their "envois de Rome", the results of the inspiration they had gained in Rome. These "envois" were annual works, sent to Paris to be judged, and were a compulsory requirement for all the pensionaries.

At first, the villa and its gardens were in a sad state and had to be renovated to house the winners of the Prix de Rome. The competition was interrupted during the first World War, and Mussolini confiscated the villa in 1941, forcing the academy of France in Rome to withdraw to Nice then to Fontainebleau until 1945. The competition and Prix de Rome were eliminated in 1968 by André Malraux (the last Grand Prix for architecture came to an end as early as 1967, the events of 1968 preventing its continuation). The Académie des Beaux-Arts in Paris and the Institut de France then lost their guardianship of the Villa Medici to the Ministry of the Culture and the State. From that time on, the boarders no longer belonged solely to the traditional disciplines (painting, sculpture, architecture, medal-engraving, precious-stone engraving, musical composition) but also to new or previously neglected artistic fields (art history, archaeology, literature, stagecraft, photography, movies, video, restoration, writing and even cookery). These artists-in-residence are known as pensionnaires. The French word pension refers to the room and board these generally young and promising artists receive. The artists are no longer recruited by a competition but by application, and their stays vary from six to eighteen months and even, more rarely, two years.

Between 1961 and 1967, the artist Balthus, then at the head of the Academy, carried out a vast restoration campaign of the palace and its gardens, providing them with modern equipment. Balthus participated "hands on" in all the phases of the construction. Where the historic décor had disappeared, Balthus proposed personal alternatives. He invented a décor that was a homage to the past and, at the same time, radically contemporary: The mysterious melancholic decor he created for Villa Medici has become, in turn, historic and was undergoing an important restoration campaign in 2016. Work continued under the direction of director Richard Peduzzi, and the Villa Medici resumed organizing exhibitions and shows created by its artists in residence.

Under director Frédéric Mitterrand the Academy opened up its guest rooms to the general public at times when they are not used by pensionnaires or other official guests.

== List of directors ==
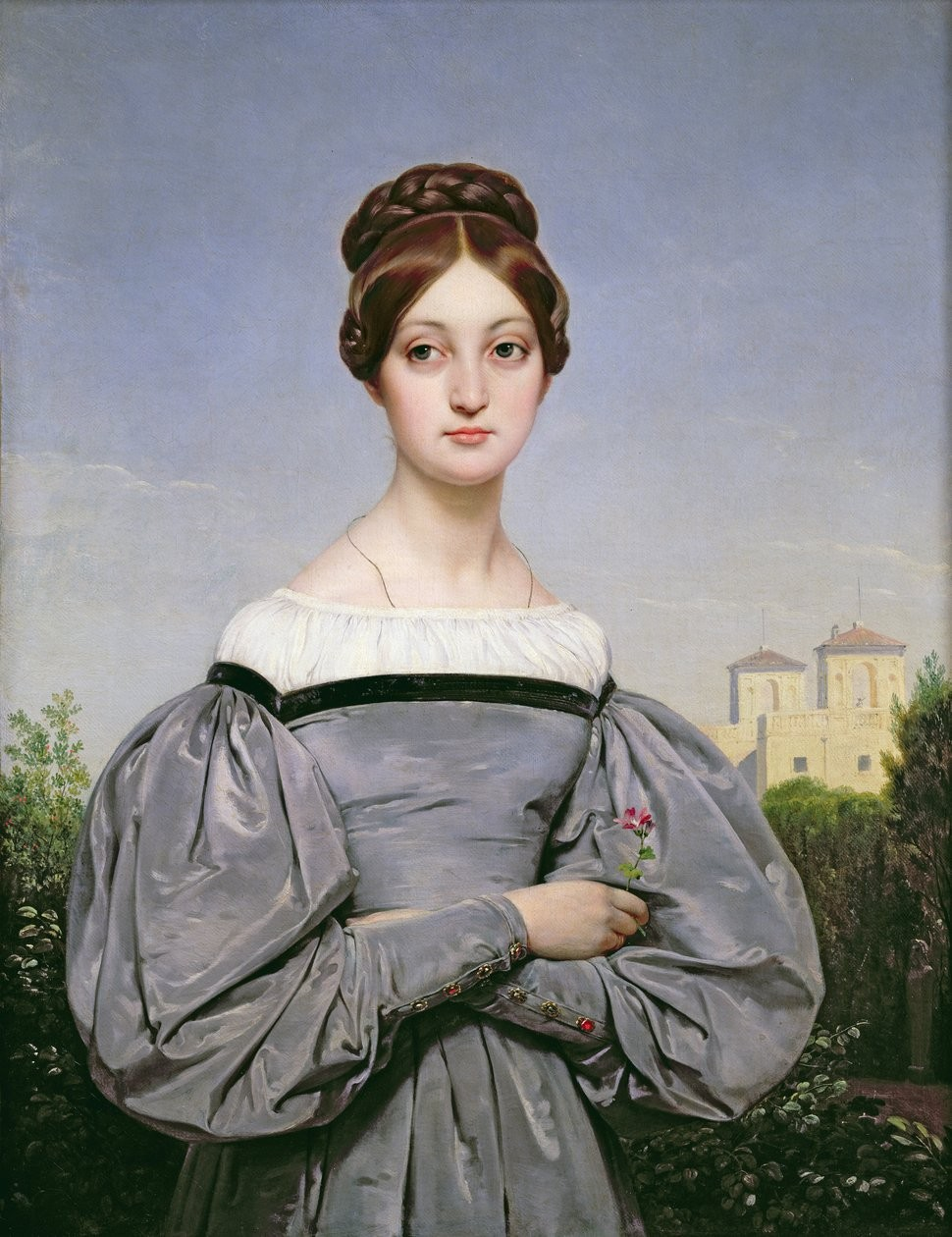
Portrait of Louise Vernet, 1830. Horace Vernet, the director of the academy, painted his daughter in front of the Villa Medici.

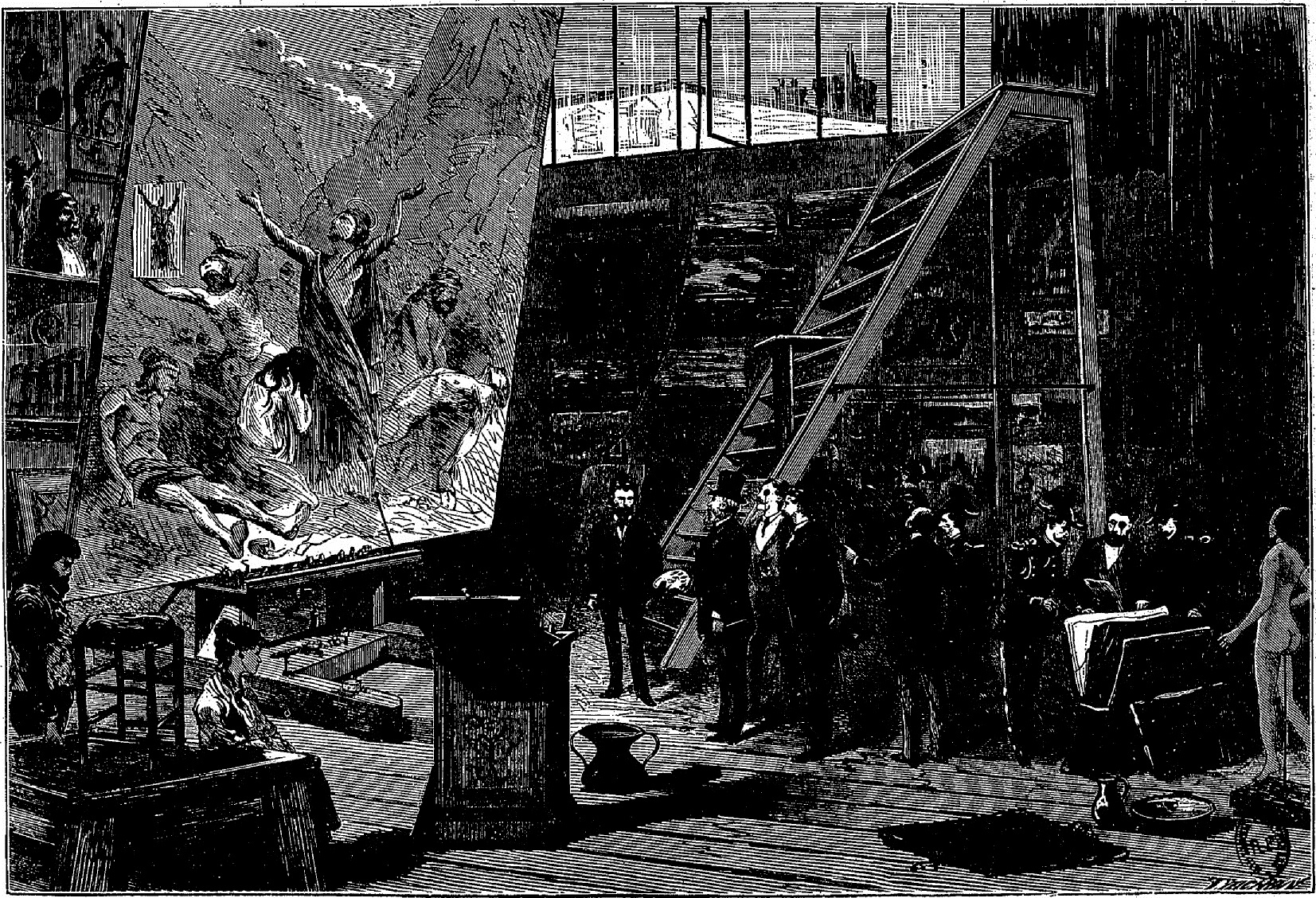
Pedro II, Emperor of Brazil, visiting the French Academy in Rome

Many famous artists have been director of the Academy:

- 1666–1672: Charles Errard
- 1673–1675: Noël Coypel
- 1675–1684: Charles Errard
- 1684–1699: Matthieu de La Teullière
- 1699–1704: René-Antoine Houasse
- 1704–1725: Charles-François Poerson
- 1725–1737: Nicolas Vleughels
- 1737–1738: Pierre de L'Estache
- 1738–1751: Jean-François de Troy
- 1751–1775: Charles-Joseph Natoire
- 1775 : Noël Hallé
- 1775–1781: Joseph-Marie Vien
- 1781–1787: Louis Jean François Lagrenée
- 1787–1792: François-Guillaume Ménageot
- 1792–1807: Joseph-Benoît Suvée
- 1807 : Pierre-Adrien Pâris
- 1807–1816: Guillaume Guillon Lethière
- 1816–1823: Charles Thévenin
- 1823–1828: Pierre-Narcisse Guérin
- 1829–1834: Horace Vernet
- 1835–1840: Jean-Auguste-Dominique Ingres
- 1841–1846: Jean-Victor Schnetz
- 1847–1852: Jean Alaux
- 1853–1866: Jean-Victor Schnetz
- 1866–1867: Joseph-Nicolas Robert-Fleury
- 1867–1873: Ernest Hébert
- 1873–1878: Jules Eugène Lenepveu
- 1879–1884: Louis-Nicolas Cabat
- 1885–1890: Ernest Hébert
- 1891–1904: Jean-Baptiste-Claude-Eugène Guillaume
- 1905–1910: Charles-Emile-Auguste Durand, a.k.a. Carolus-Duran
- 1913–1921: Albert Besnard
- 1921–1933: Denys Puech
- 1933–1937: Paul-Maximilien Landowski
- 1937–1960: Jacques Ibert
- 1961–1977: Comte Balthazar Klossowski de Rola, a.k.a. Balthus
- 1979–1985: Jean Leymarie
- 1985–1994: Jean-Marie Drot
- 1994–1997: Pierre-Jean Angremy, a.k.a. Pierre-Jean Rémy
- 1997–2002: Bruno Racine
- 2002–2008: Richard Peduzzi
- 2008–2009: Frédéric Mitterrand
- 2009–2015: Eric de Chassey
- 2015–2018: Muriel Mayette-Holtz
- 2020–present: Sam Stourdzé

== See also ==
- Villa Massimo
