= Matthieu de La Teulière =

French artist

Matthieu de La Teulière († 1702) was a 17th-century French artist. From 1684 to 1699 he was the director of the French Academy in Rome.
