= J. G. W. Henderson =

Fellow of King's College, Cambridge

John Graham Wilmot Henderson is a retired Professor of Classics at Cambridge University, and a Fellow of King's College, Cambridge.

Henderson has worked within the Classics Faculty since 1975, as Assistant Lecturer (1975–1978), Lecturer (1978–1996) and Reader in Latin literature (1996–2003). He was awarded a personal professorship in Classics in 2003. Following retirement he has the status of Emeritus Professor of Classics.

His publications include collaborations with Mary Beard, his Cambridge colleague.

== Publications ==
Books by John Henderson.

- Henderson, John (2007). The Medieval World of Isidore of Seville: Truth from Words. Cambridge: Cambridge University Press. ISBN 978-0-521-86740-5. OCLC 71347575.
- Henderson, John (2006). Oxford Reds: Classic Commentaries on Latin Classics. R. G. Austin, C. J. Fordyce, R. G. M. Nisbet. London: Duckworth. ISBN 0-7156-3516-6. OCLC 63398729.
- Plautus, Titus Maccius (2006). Asinaria: The One About the Asses. John Henderson. Madison: University of Wisconsin Press. ISBN 978-0-299-21993-2. OCLC 226969074.
- Henderson, John (2006). Fighting for Rome: Poets and Caesars, History and Civil War. Cambridge: Cambridge University Press. ISBN 978-0-521-02866-0. OCLC 70844568.
- Henderson, John (2005). The Triumph of Art at Thorvaldsens Museum 'Løve' in Copenhagen. Stig Miss. Copenhagen: Museum Tusculanum Press, University of Copenhagen. ISBN 87-635-0132-5. OCLC 61521809.
- Henderson, John (2004). Morals and Villas in Seneca's Letters: Places to Dwell. Cambridge. ISBN 978-0-511-48222-9. OCLC 1170052040.
- Henderson, John (2004). Hortus: The Roman Book of Gardening. London: Routledge. ISBN 978-0415324502. OCLC 56551236.
- Phaedrus (2004). Aesop's Human Zoo: Roman Stories About Our Bodies. John Henderson, Thomas Bewick. Chicago: University of Chicago. ISBN 0-226-32681-0. OCLC 56445440.
- Henderson, John (2002). Pliny's Statue: The Letters, Self-Portraiture & Classical Art. Exeter, UK: University of Exeter Press. ISBN 0-85989-720-6. OCLC 50614225.
- Phaedrus (2001). Telling Tales on Caesar: Roman Stories from Phaedrus. John Henderson. Oxford: Oxford University Press. ISBN 0-19-924095-7. OCLC 44518029.
- Henderson, John (1999). Writing Down Rome: Satire, Comedy, and Other Offences in Latin Poetry. Oxford: Clarendon Press. ISBN 0-19-815077-6. OCLC 39556352.
- Hunter, R. L. (1998). Juvenal's Mayor: The Professor Who Lived on 2d. a Day. Cambridge Philological Society. Cambridge: Cambridge Philological Society. ISBN 0-906014-19-0. OCLC 39875560.
- Henderson, John (1998). A Roman Life: Rutilius Gallicus on Paper & in Stone. Exeter, Devon: University of Exeter Press. ISBN 0-85989-565-3. OCLC 39221601.
- Henderson, John (1997). Figuring out Roman Nobility: Juvenal's Eighth Satire. Exeter, Devon, UK: University of Exeter Press. ISBN 0-85989-517-3. OCLC 36771748.
