= Pierre de l'Estache =

French sculptor

Pierre de l'Estache (c. 1688, Paris - 28 November 1774, Rome) was a French sculptor.

He produced a copy of the Kallipygian Venus in Rome in 1722-23, for Augustus the Strong's Grosser Garten in Dresden (this copy was destroyed with the gardens in 1945). He was president of the French Academy in Rome in 1737-1738. His son Charles de L'Estache was also a sculptor (?-14 March 1811)

== Bibliography ==
- (in French) Anne-Lise Desmas, Pierre de L'Estache (1688 ca. - 1774) : un sculpteur français à Rome entre institutions nationales et grands chantiers pontificaux, in Studiolo, 1, 2002 (includes a catalogue of his work, biography, reception and bibliography)
