= Jean-Baptiste Lemoyne (sculptor) =

French sculptor (1704–1778)

Jean Baptiste Lemoyne
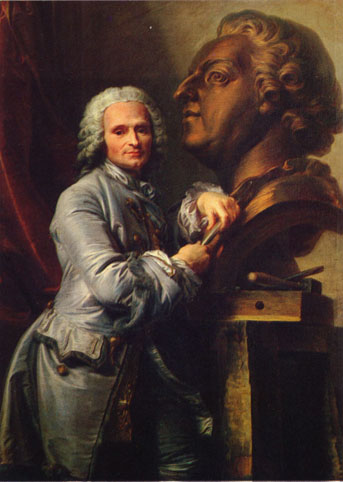
- Portrait by Jean Valade, Palace of Versailles (c. 1754)
- Born: Jean Baptiste Lemoyne; 15 February 1704; Paris, France
- Died: 25 May 1778 (aged 74); Paris, France
- Works: Fontaine des Quatre-Saisons
- Parent: Jean-Louis Lemoyne

Jean-Baptiste Lemoyne (French pronunciation: [ʒɑ̃ batist ləmwan]; 15 February 1704 – 25 May 1778) was a French sculptor of the 18th century who worked in both the rococo and neoclassical style. He made monumental statuary for the Gardens of Versailles but was best known for his expressive portrait busts.

== Life ==
Jean-Baptiste Lemoyne was born in Paris in 1704. His father Jean-Louis Lemoyne, was also a sculptor, and was first teacher. He later became a student of another prominent sculptor, Robert Le Lorrain. He is sometimes referred to as Jean-Baptiste II Lemoyne or "the younger" to distinguish him from his uncle of the same name, another sculptor, Jean-Baptiste Lemoyne the Elder.

He received the prix de Rome awarded by the Académie royale de peinture et de sculpture, but remained in Paris to aid his blind father. He became a member of the Academy in 1838, and, later became its director. Like the other royal sculptors, made statuary for the Gardens of Versailles. He was a particular favorite of Madame de Pompadour, the mistress of the King and an important patron of the arts. He made a graceful rococo sculpture of Vertumnus and Pomone, two characters from the Metamorphoses of Ovid, which was a favorite theme of Madame Pompadour. The sculpture is now in the Louvre. He also made a state of Madame Pompadour in the costume of a nymph. He made several busts of Louis XV, and an equestrian statue of the King for the courtyard of the new Ecole Militaire, but this was destroyed during the French Revolution.

He was especially known for the quality of his portrait busts, which captured the passing nuances of expression and gave a sense of movement. His important portrait busts included those of the naturalist René Antoine Ferchault de Réaumur (1751); the painter Noël-Nicolas Coypel (1760); the scientist Fontenelle (at Versailles); Madame de Pompadour; and Marie-Antoinette in 1771. He is considered the most skilled of the French rococo sculptors.

Lemoyne's students included Étienne Maurice Falconet Jean-Baptiste Pigalle, and Augustin Pajou.

== Sculpture ==
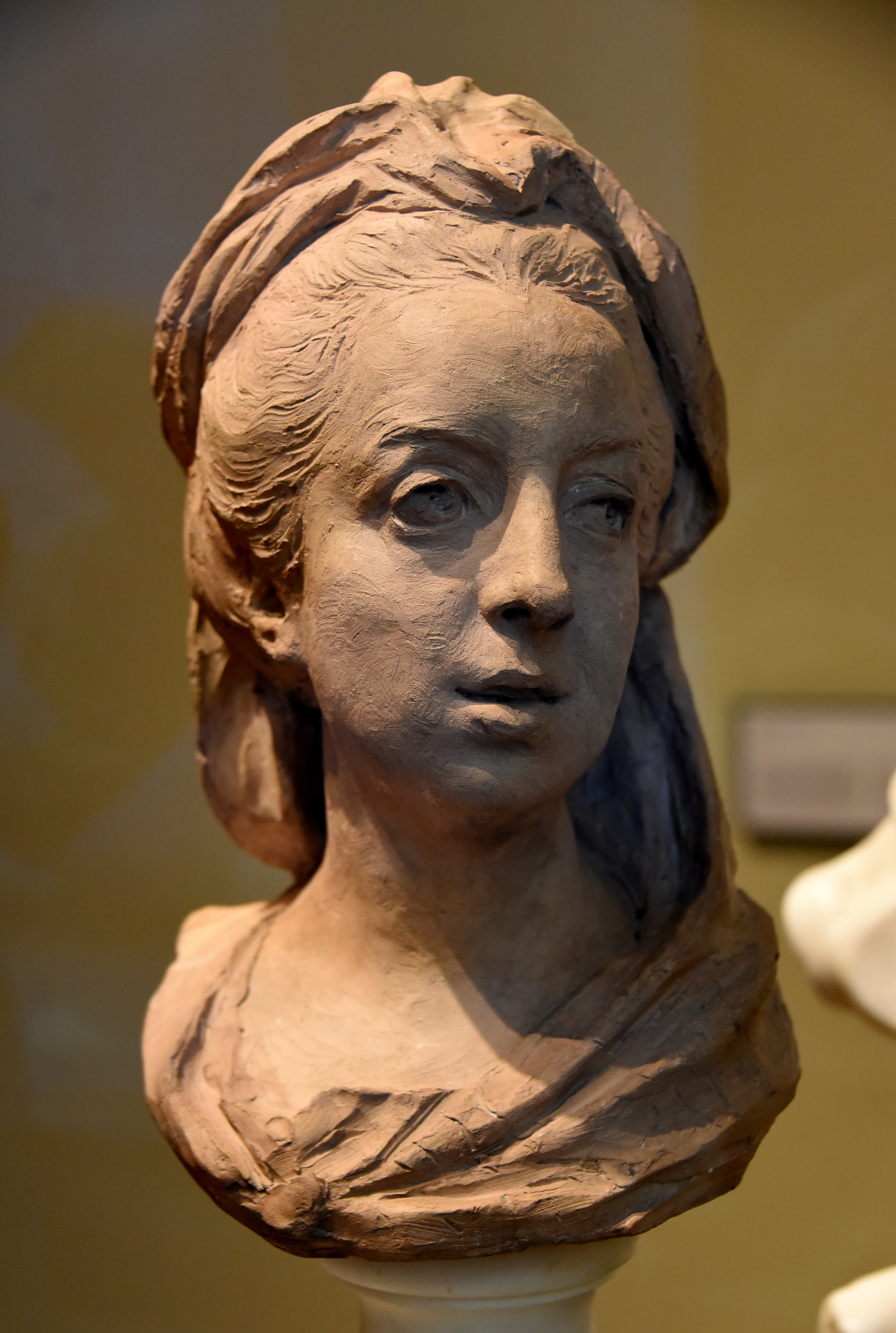
The Comtesse de Feuquieres by Jean-Baptiste Lemoyne. Terracotta, circa 1738 CE. From Paris, France. The Victoria and Albert Museum, London

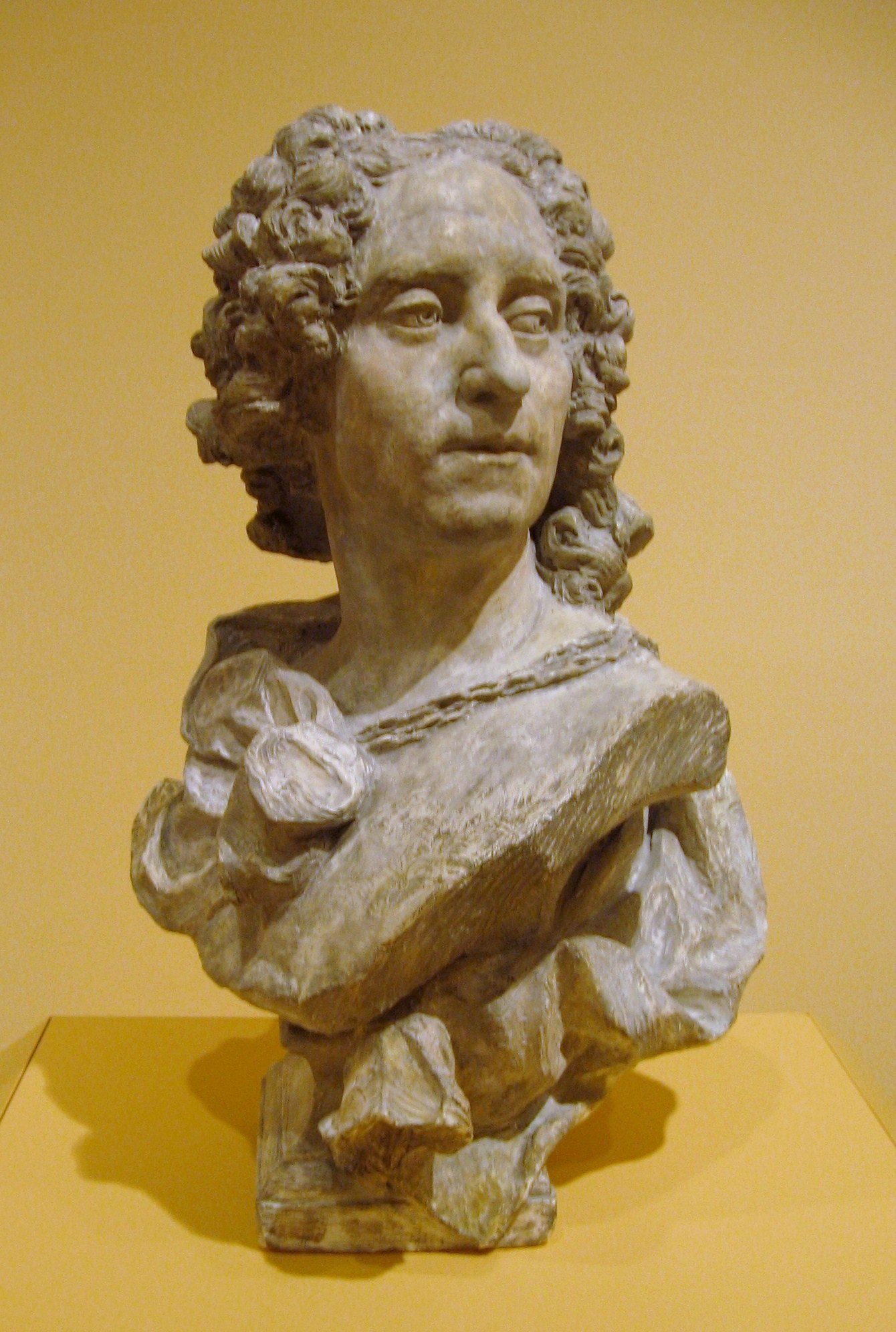
A plaster bust of his friend Noel-Nicolas Coypel, 1730 (Raclin Murphy Museum of Art)

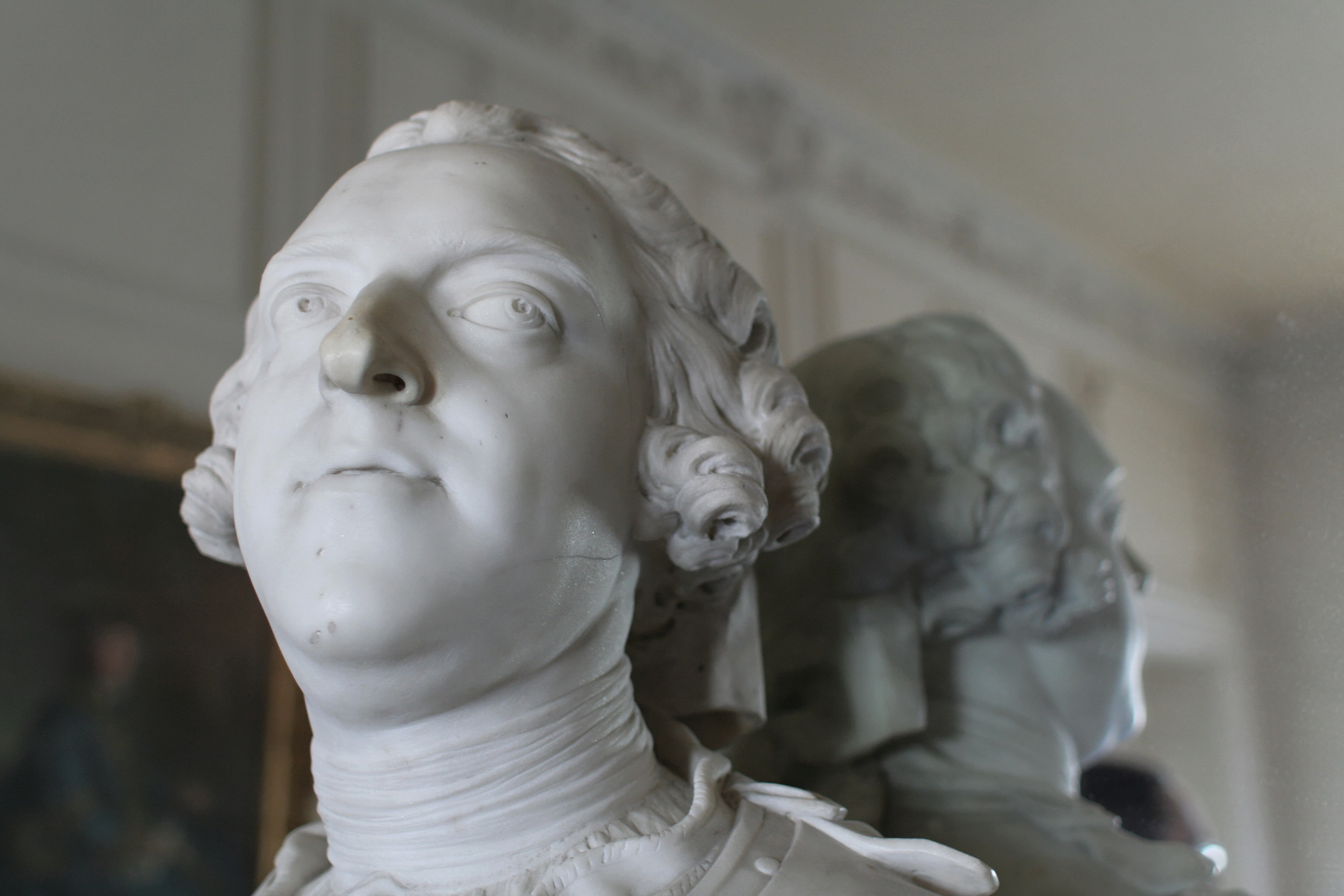
Louis XV (1749), Palace of Versailles

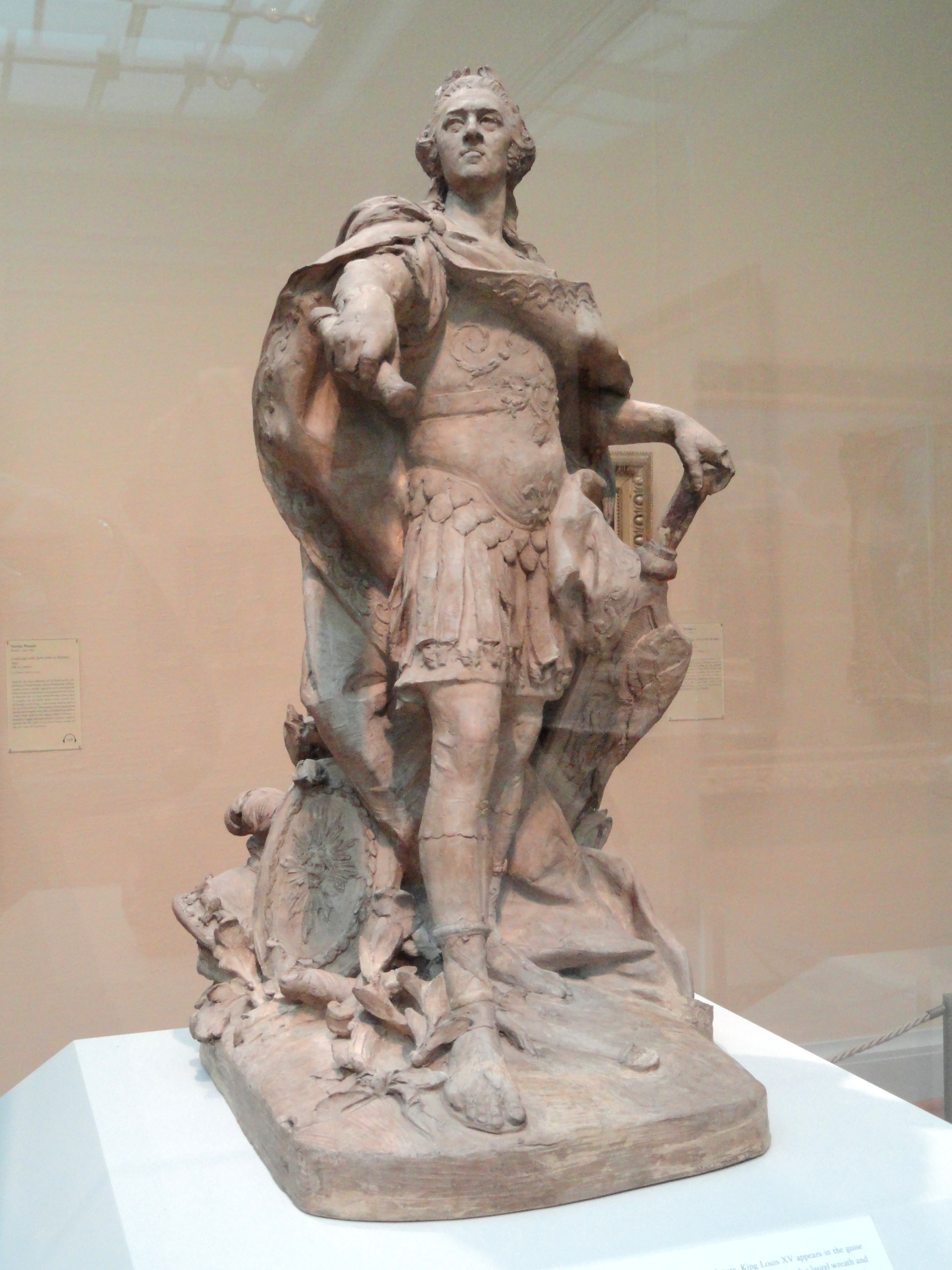
Model for a Monument to Louis XV in Rennes (1746–48), Art Institute of Chicago

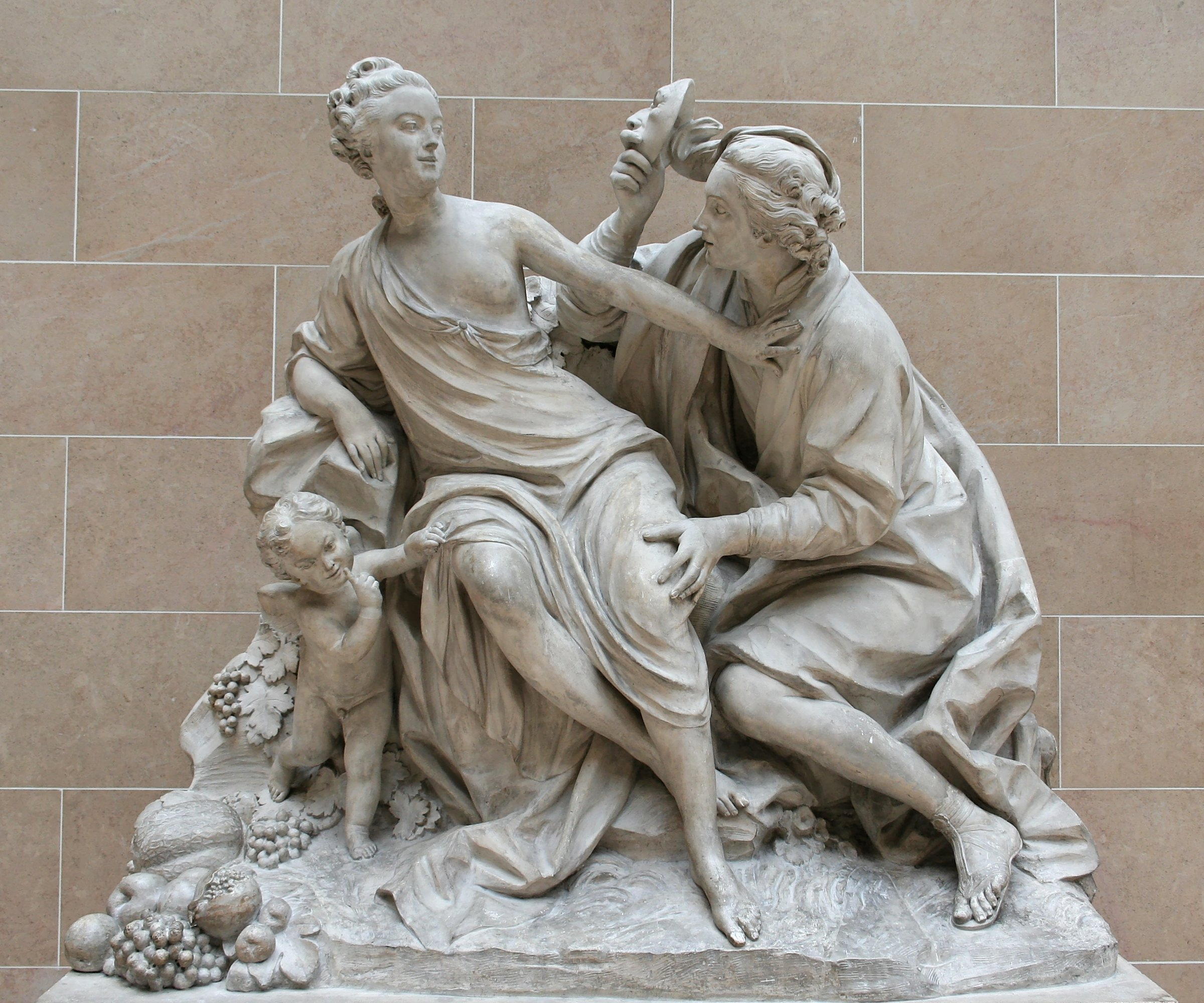
Vertumnus and Pomona, 1760 (the Louvre)

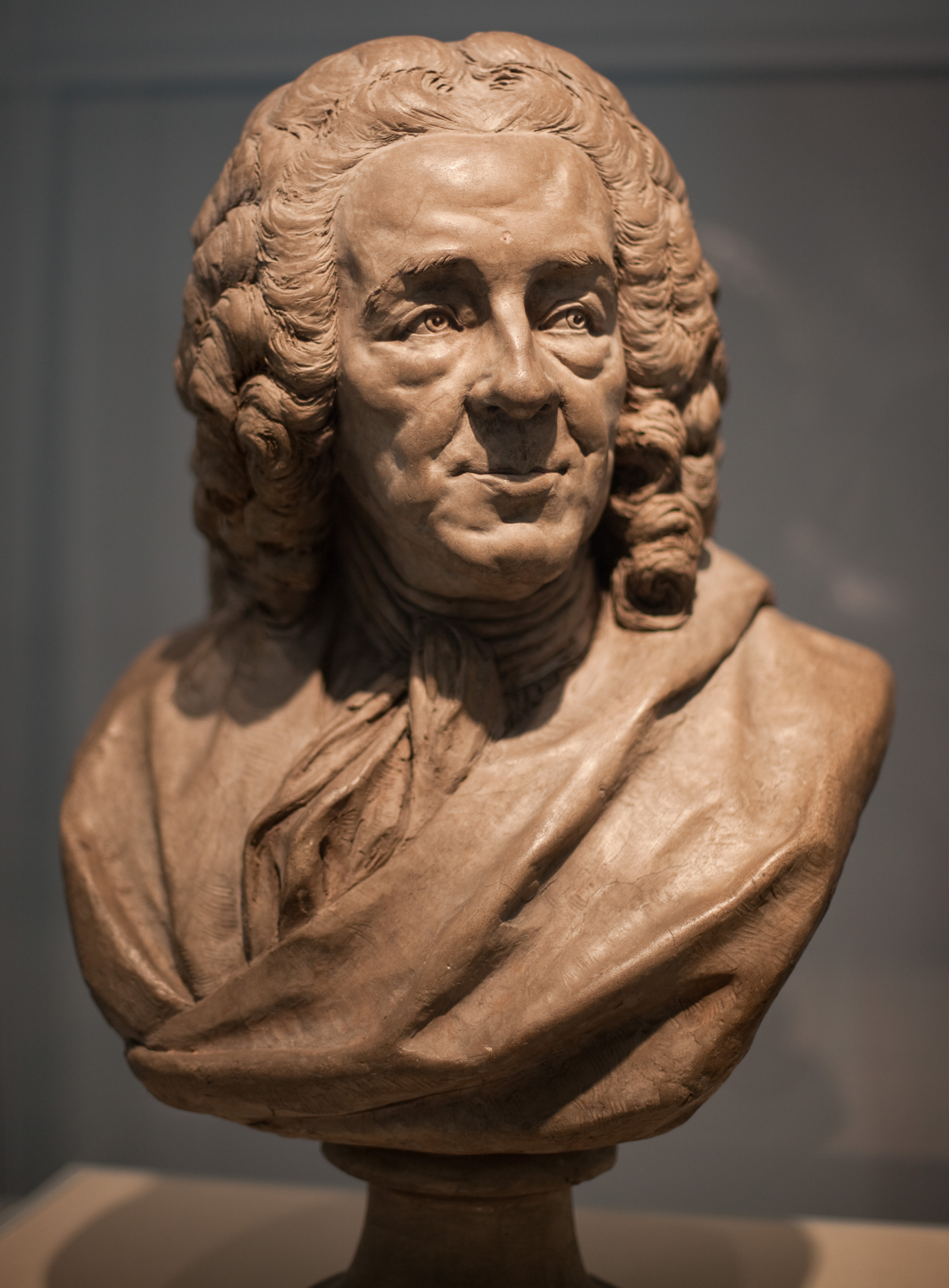
Essaying and scientist Bernard Le Bovier de Fontenelle (1749) Carnegie Museum of Art

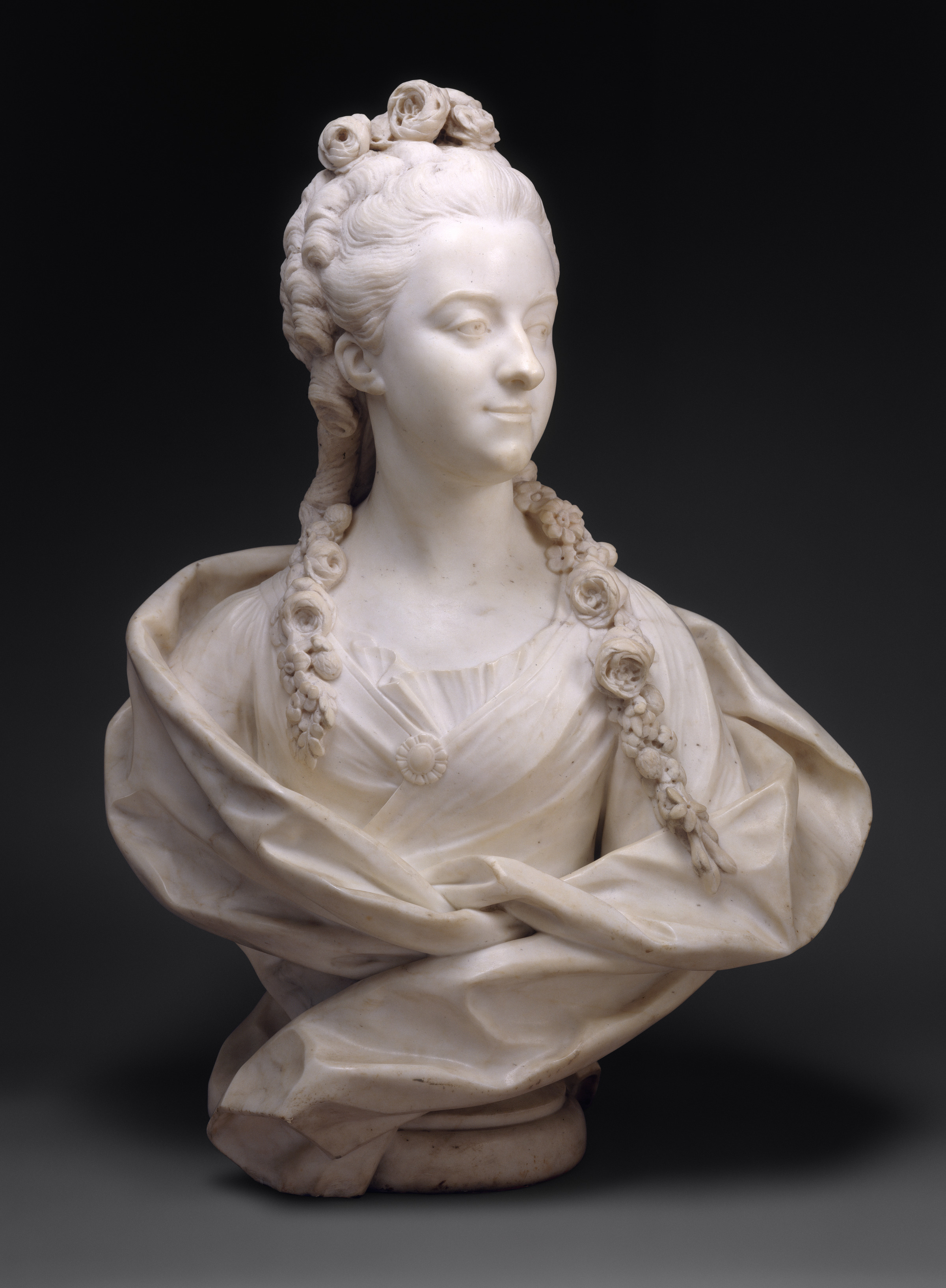
Geneviève-Françoise Randon de Malboissière (1768), Metropolitan Museum of Art

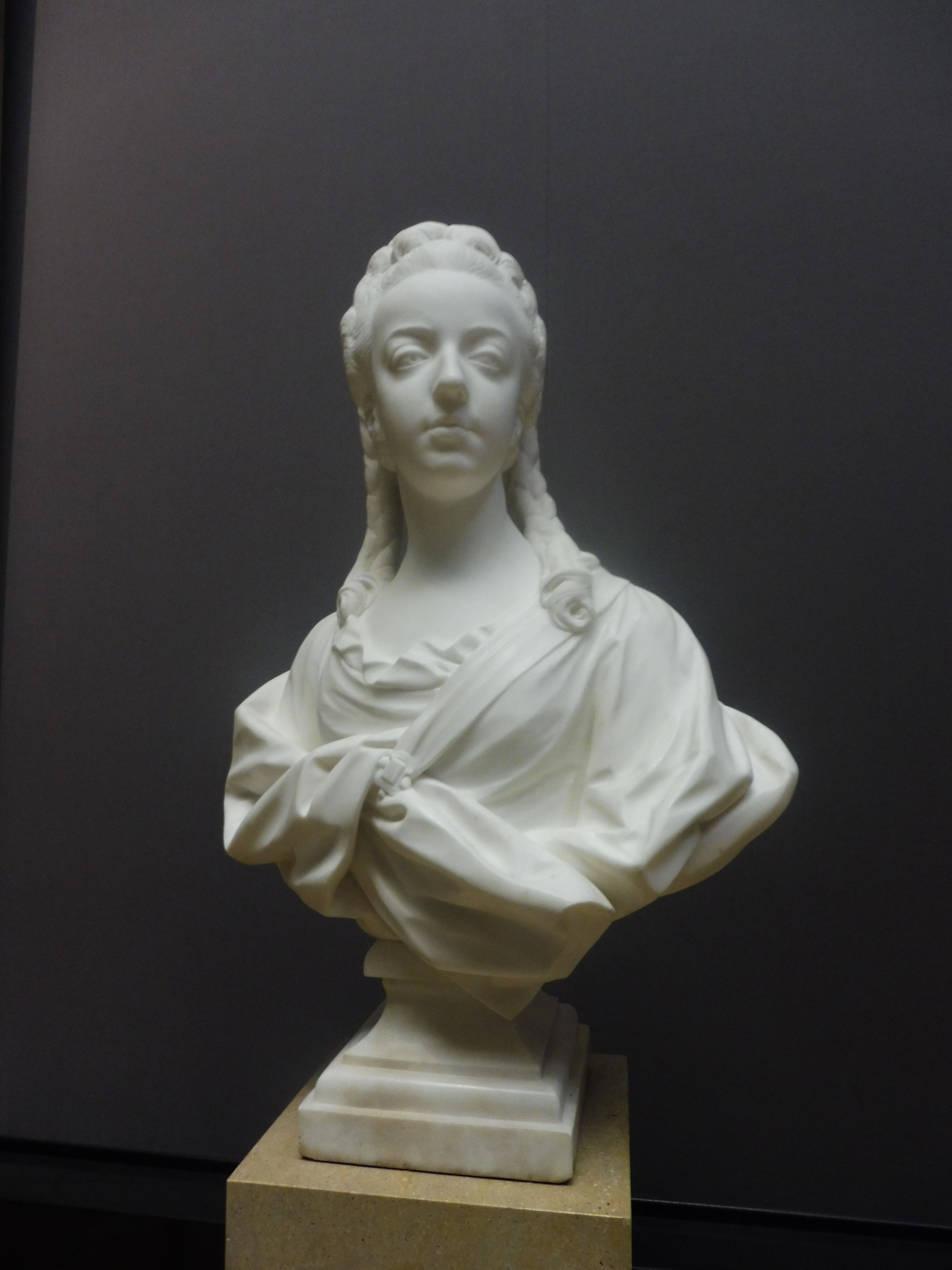
Marie-Antoinette (1771) (Musée d'Histoire de l'art, Vienne)

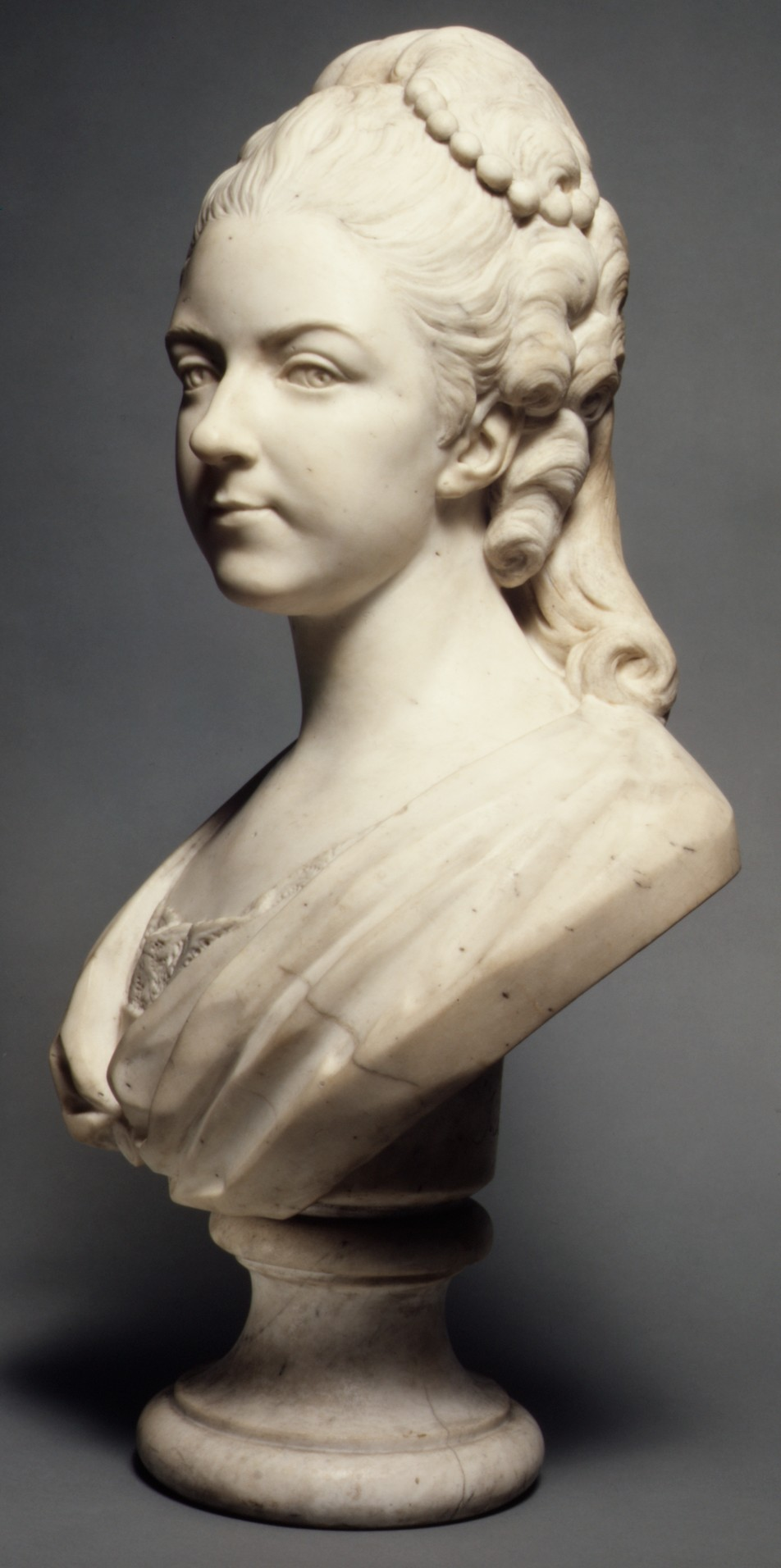
The Duchesse de La Rochefoucauld (1774), Metropolitan Museum of Art

== See also ==
- Rococo
- French sculpture

== Bibliography ==
- Brocvielle, Vincent (2017). La Petit Larousse de l'Histoire de l'Art (in French). Larousse. ISBN 978-2-03-5936-39-4.
- Jeancolas, Claude (1992). Sculpture Française. Paris: CELIV. ISBN 2-86535-162-9.
- Geese, Uwe, Section on Baroque sculpture in L'Art Baroque – Architecture – Sculpture – Peinture (French translation from German), H.F. Ulmann, Cologne, 2015. (ISBN 978-3-8480-0856-8)
- Duby, Georges and Daval, Jean-Luc, La Sculpture de l'Antiquité au XXe Siècle, (French translation from German), Taschen, (2013), (ISBN 978-3-8365-4483-2)
