= Antoine Coypel =

French painter (1661–1722)

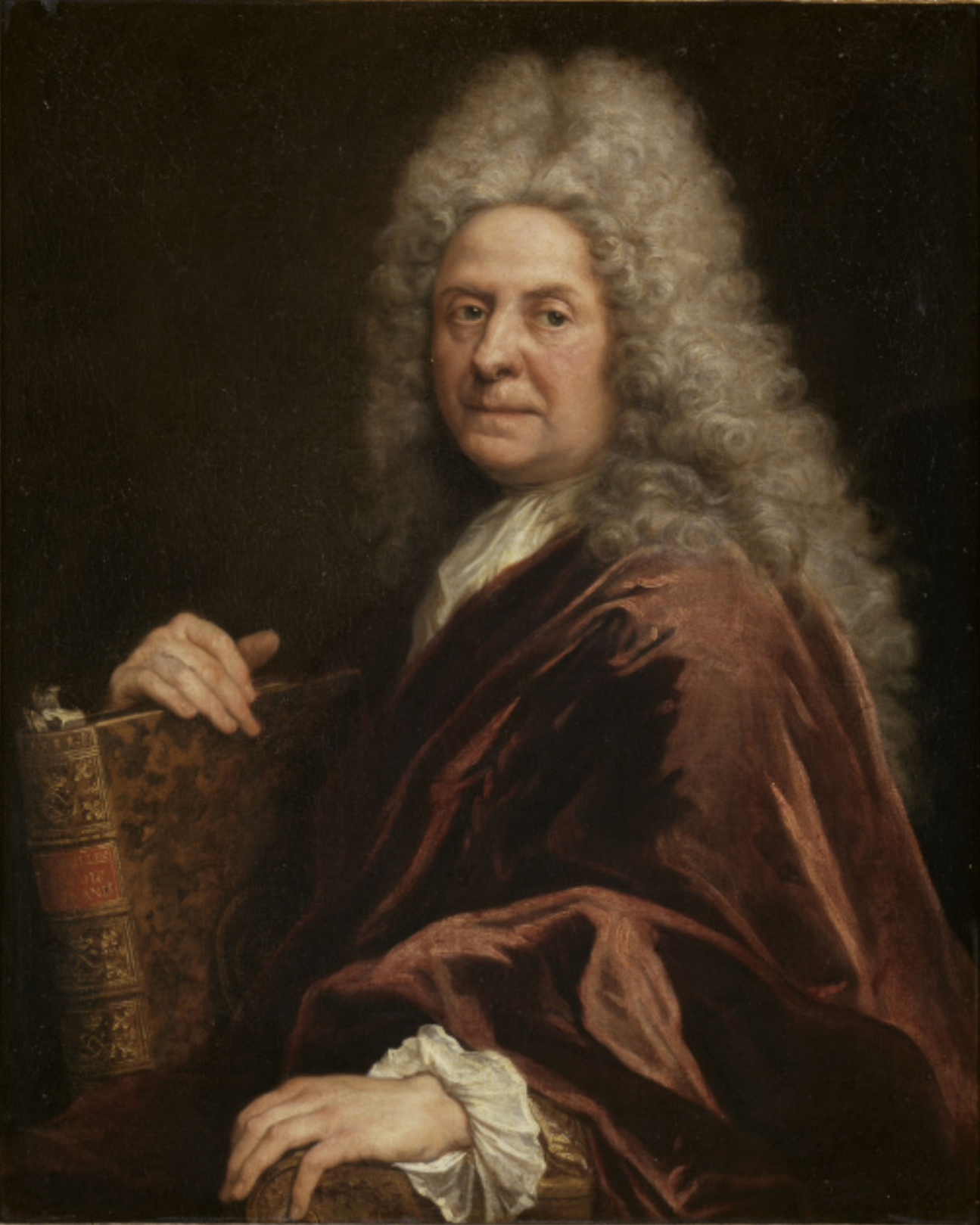
- Self-portrait (1715)
- Born: 11 April 1661; Paris, Kingdom of France
- Died: 7 January 1722 (aged 60); Paris, Kingdom of France
- Known for: Painting
- Children: Charles-Antoine Coypel
- Father: Noël Coypel
- Relatives: Noël-Nicolas Coypel (brother)

Director of the Académie de Peinture et de Sculpture
- In office 1714–1722
- Monarchs: Louis XIV, Louis XV
- Preceded by: Corneille Van Clève
- Succeeded by: Louis de Boullogne

Antoine Coypel (French pronunciation: [ɑ̃twan kwapɛl]; 11 April 1661 – 7 January 1722) was a French painter, pastellist, engraver, decorative designer and draughtsman. He became court painter first to Philippe I, Duke of Orléans, and later to King Louis XV. He became director of the Académie Royale. He was given the title of Garde des tableaux et dessins du roi (Keeper of the paintings and drawings of the king), a function which combined the role of director and curator of the king's art collection. He was raised to the nobility by the French king. He is known for his history paintings, biblical, mythological and allegorical works, portraits and genre scenes.

== Life ==
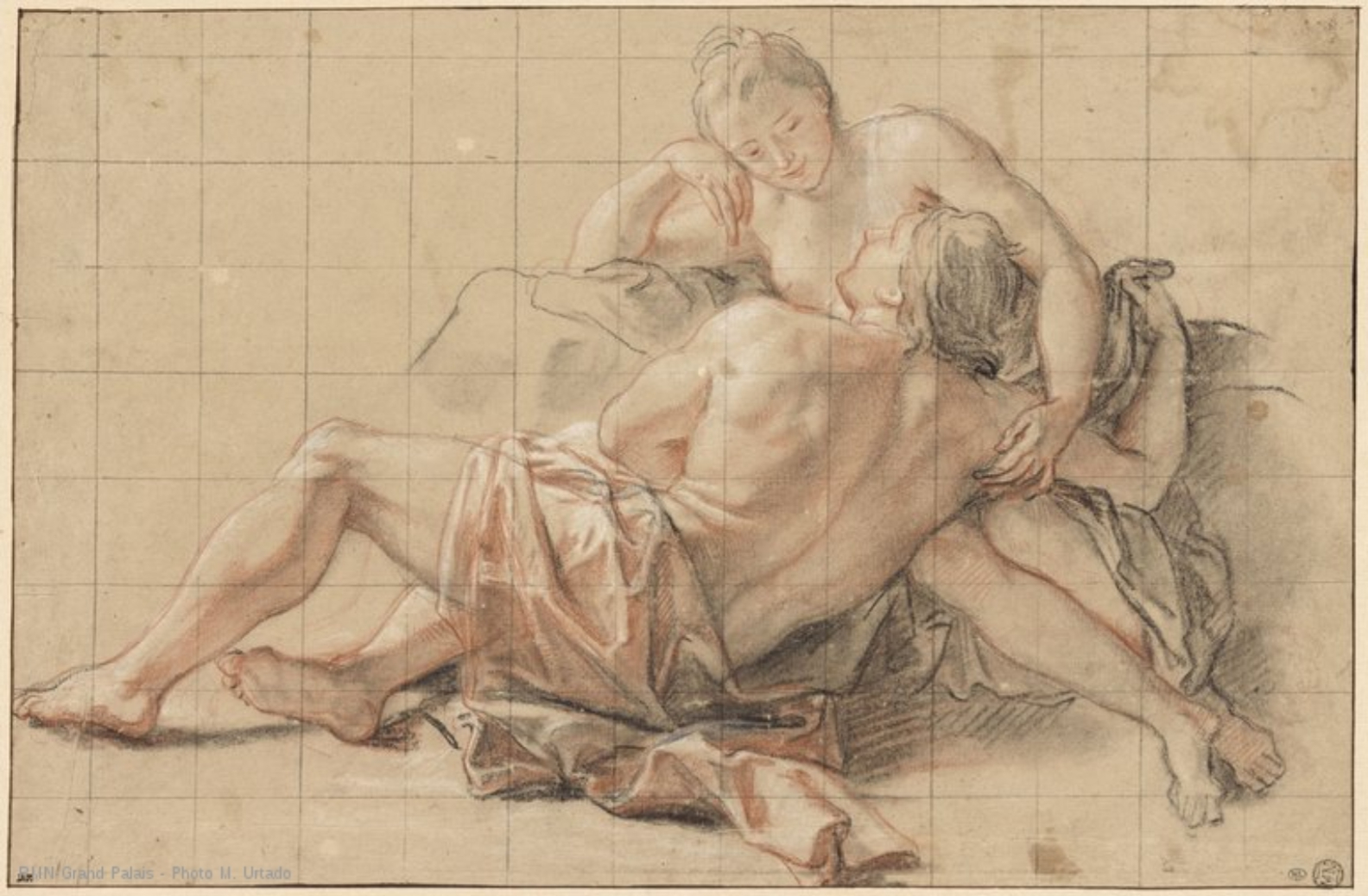
Man resting in the lap of a woman

Antoine Coypel was born in Paris as the son of the French painter Noël Coypel. He studied under his father, with whom he spent four years in Rome after his father had been appointed director of the French academy in 1672. In Rome he sketched the Antique monuments and artworks and studied the works of the Italian Renaissance and Baroque, in particular of Raphael, Carracci, Titian, Veronese and Correggio. He became acquainted with the contemporary artists Gianlorenzo Bernini and Carlo Maratta. Bernini became his mentor. He won a prize for drawing at the Accademia di San Luca, the association of artists in Rome.

Coypel completed his training at the Académie Royale in Paris. In 1689 he received an important commission for an altarpiece in the Notre-Dame de Paris. In 1681, at the age of 20 he was admitted (reçu) as a full member of the Académie royale with the submission of a work called Louis XIV repose dans le sein de la Gloire après la paix de Nimègue (Louis XIV rests in the bosom of Glory after the Peace of Nijmegen) (Musée Fabre). He worked on many of the French king's construction projects of that time including in Versailles, Trianon, Marly and Meudon. He was in 1685 appointed premier peintre of the Duke of Orléans (the French king's eldest brother who at the time was Philippe I, Duke of Orléans). The House of Orléans remained an important patron of the artist for many years. Between 1701 and 1706, he created one of his most brilliant works for the d'Orléans family, the vault of the Aeneas Gallery in the Palais-Royal (now disappeared). The work was completed a few years later by a cycle of seven additional paintings.

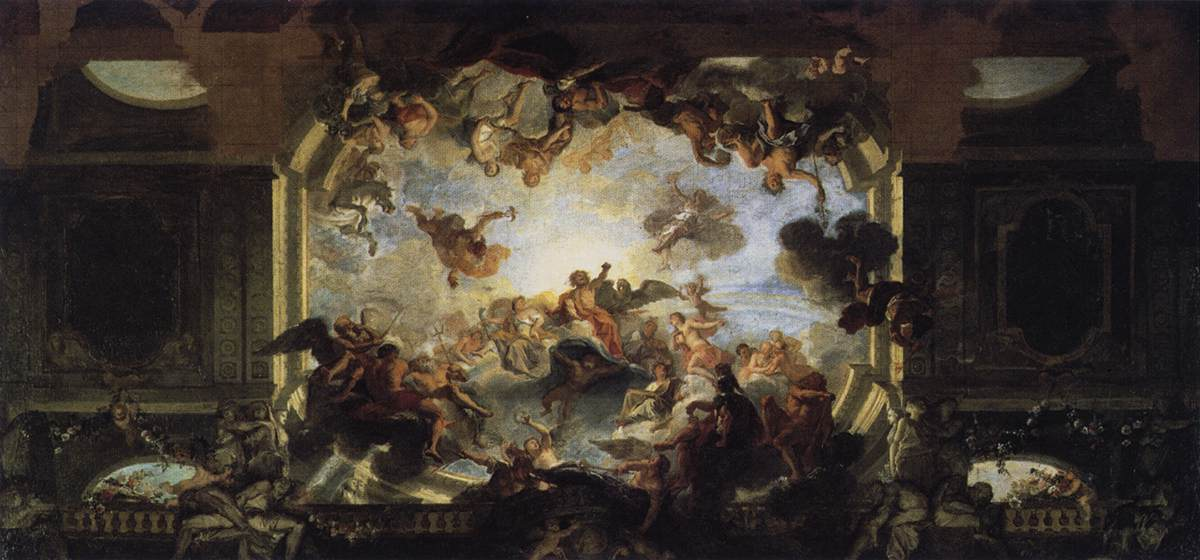
Mount Olympus

Coypel became professor and rector of the academy in 1707 and director in 1714, and in 1716 was appointed king's painter. He was raised to the nobility the following year. He completed an extensive decoration of the ceiling of the Royal chapel at Versailles in 1708, in the manner of the Roman Baroque.

His half-brother Noël-Nicolas and his son Charles-Antoine Coypel (1694–1752) were also accomplished painters. The sculptor François Dumont was his brother-in-law.

Coypel died in 1722, at 61 years of age.

== Paintings ==
Antoine Coypel's style was eclectic. He worked initially in the French classical tradition which he renewed with a colourful palette. He went through a period in which he was strongly influenced by Rubens as is clear in certain paintings, in particular his Democritus (1692, Louvre). Coypel's spirit of renewal is evident in the series of large paintings on Old Testament themes, which were very well received at the time: Susan accused of adultery (c. 1695, Museo del Prado) and The sacrifice of Jephta's daughter (c. 1695-1697 Musée Magnin). He was, with Jean Jouvenet, Charles de La Fosse and Louis de Boullogne, one of the best examples of the transition in French painting from the austere manner of the reign of Louis XIV to the lighter style of the 18th century.

== Drawings ==
Coypel was one of the leading draughtsmen of his generation. About 500 of his drawings survive, many of them kept at the Louvre. They comprise figure studies and preparatory drawings for his paintings. He was particularly skilled in the use of coloured pencils and chalks.

== Gallery ==
Selected works

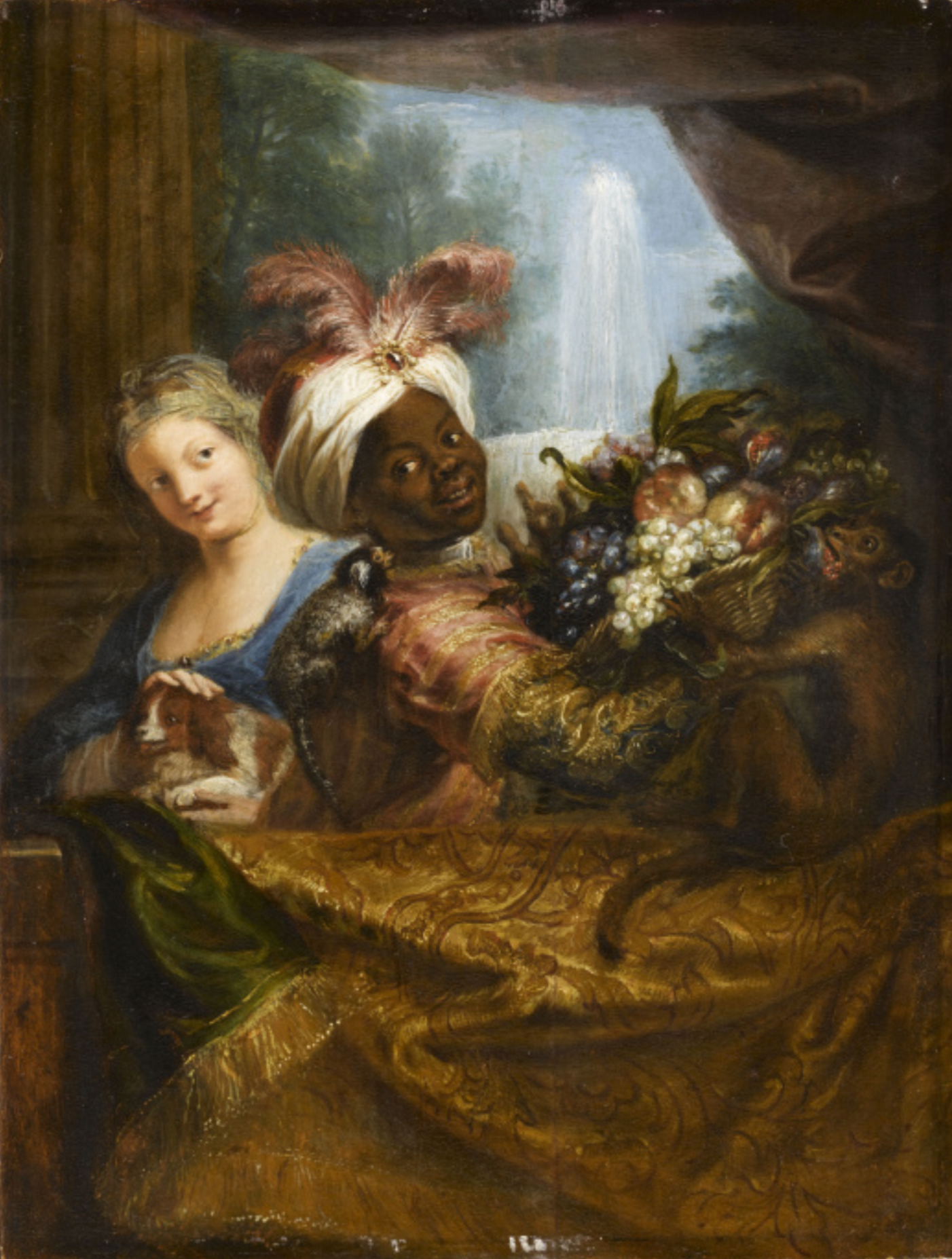
Young black boy holding a fruit basket and a girl stroking a dog, 1682, Louvre

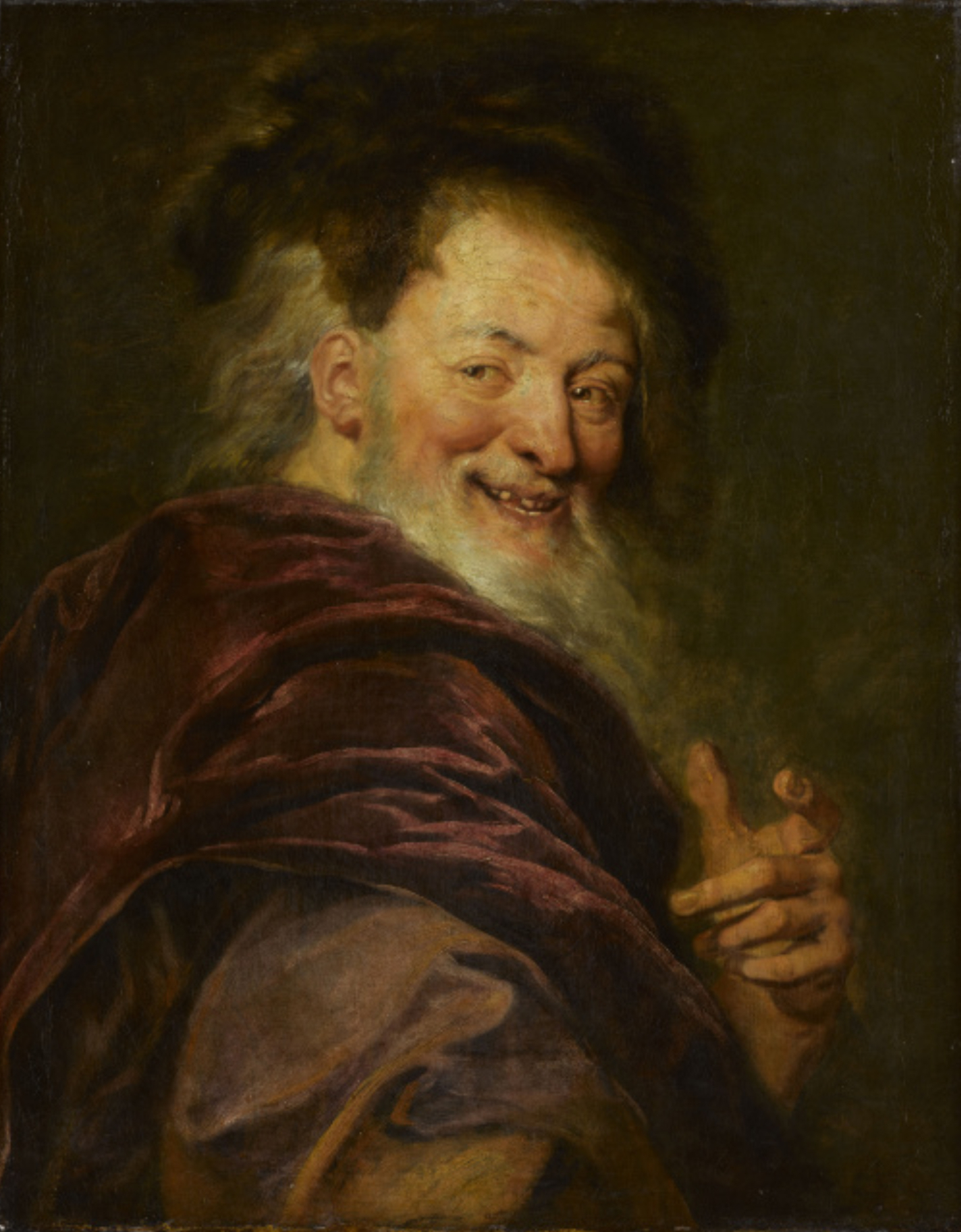
Democritus, 1692, Louvre

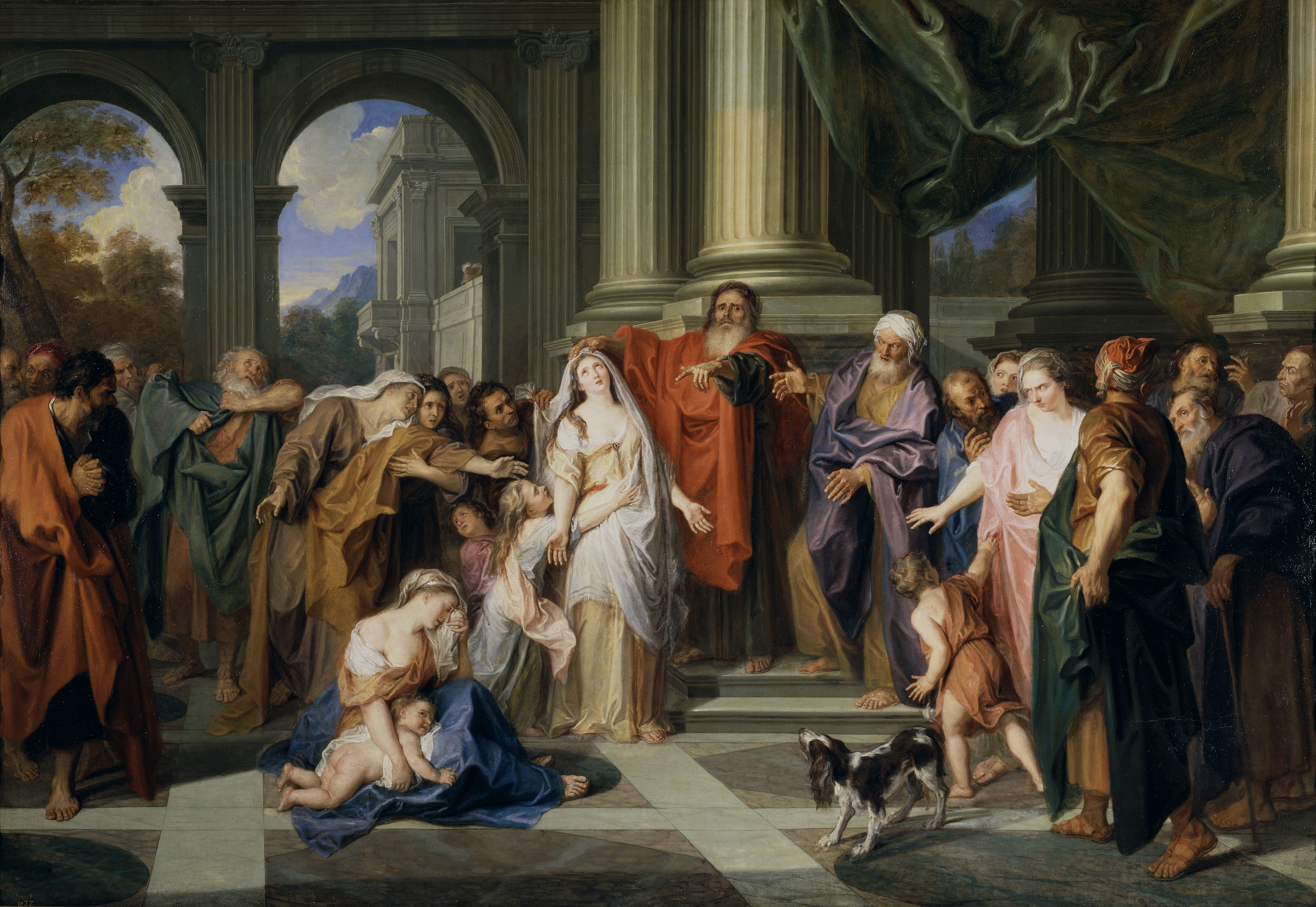
Susan accused of adultery, c. 1695, Museo del Prado

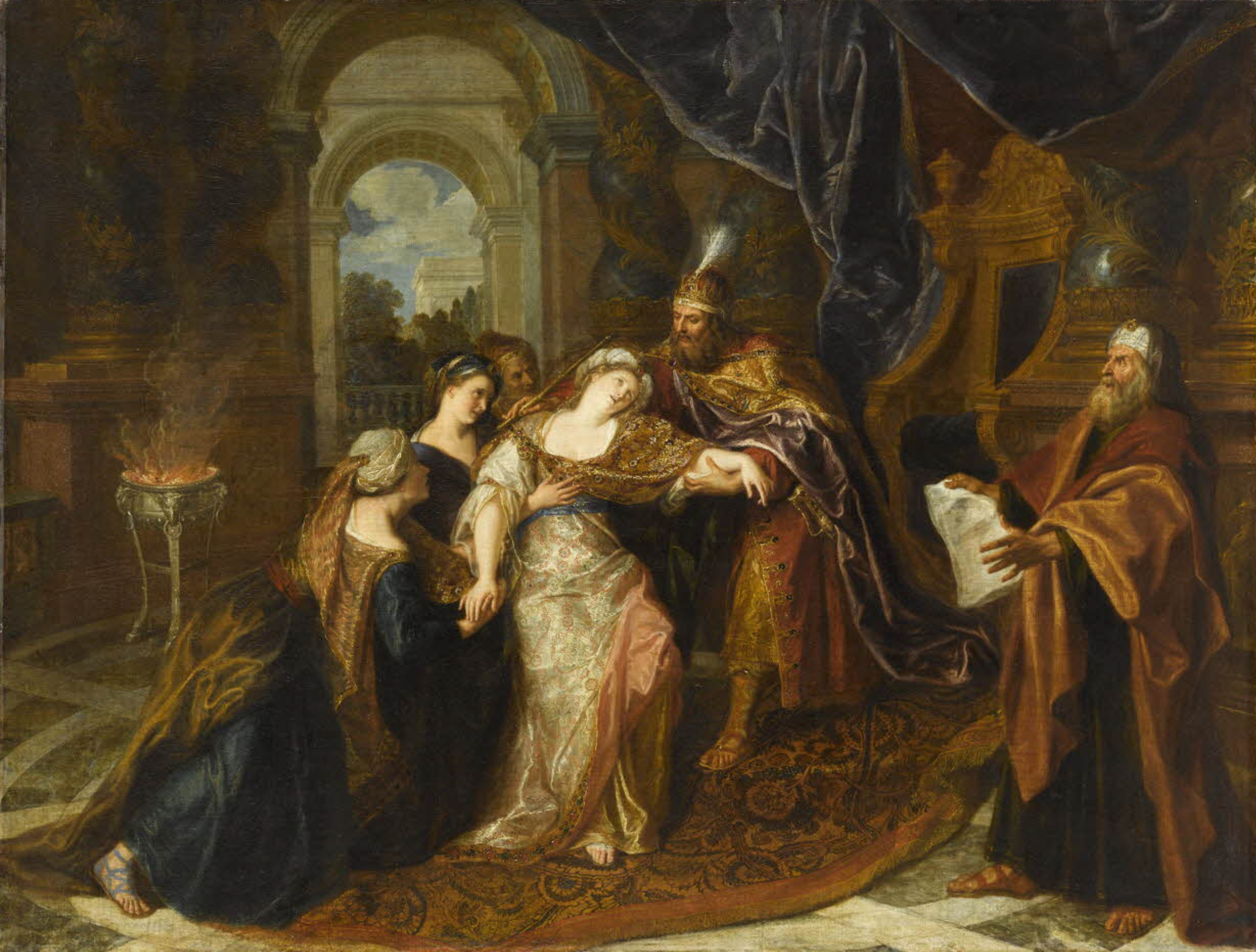
The Swooning of Esther, 1704, Louvre
