= Noël-Nicolas Coypel =

French painter (1690–1734)

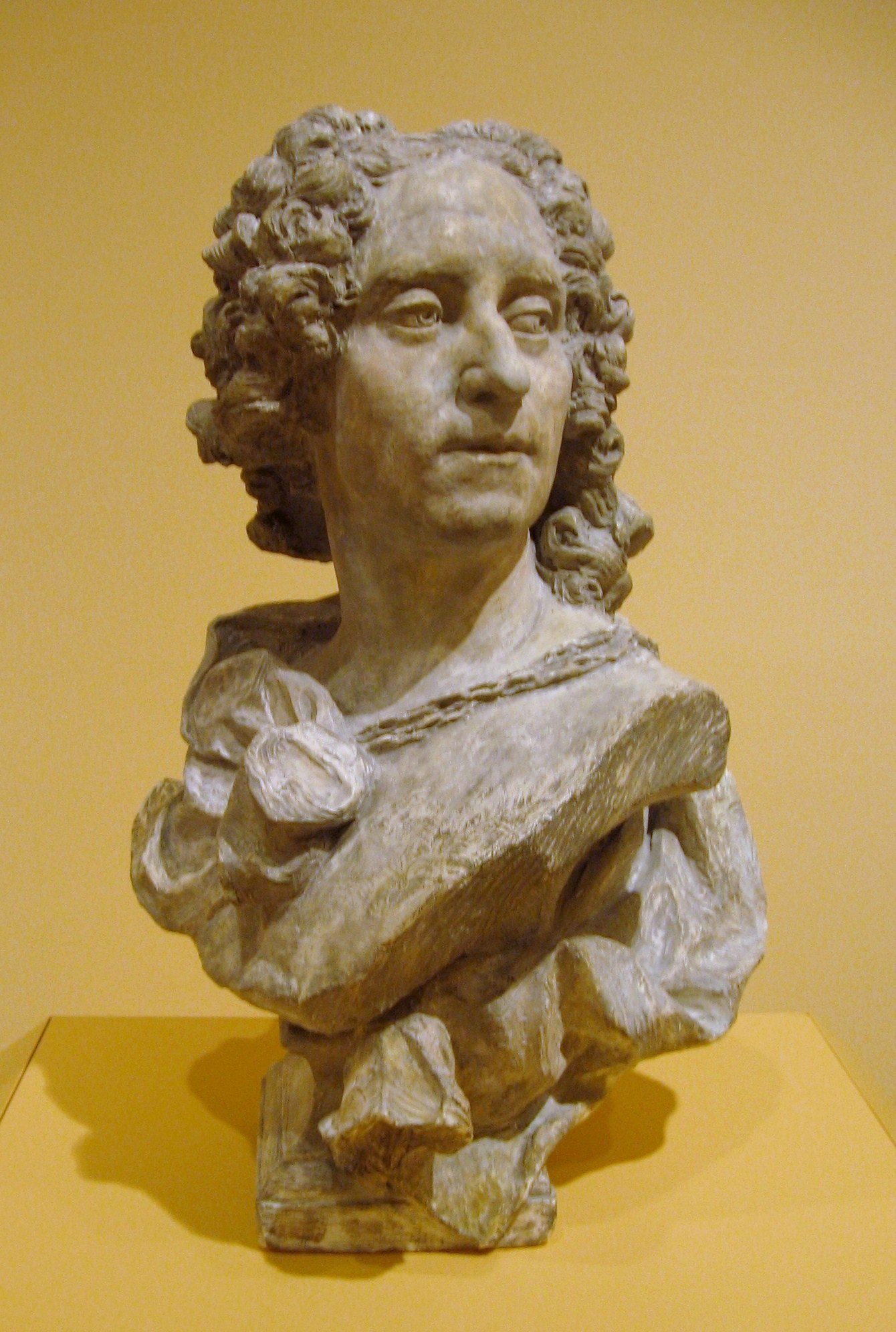
Noël-Nicolas Coypel, by Jean-Baptiste Lemoyne (c.1729)

Noël-Nicolas Coypel (French pronunciation: [nɔɛl nikɔla kwapɛl]; 17 November 1690 – 14 December 1734) was a French Baroque painter.

== Biography ==
He was born in Paris. His father, Noël Coypel, was a well-known artist, as was his half-brother, Antoine Coypel, who was almost thirty years his senior. He learned the basic elements of painting from them. After winning several awards from the Académie Royale, he received their accreditation in 1716 and became a full member in 1720, when Antoine was the Rector there. His reception piece was a depiction of the god Neptune abducting the nymph Amymone.

In 1727, King Louis XV announced a competition to promote history painting at the Académie. Coypel submitted "The Triumph of Amphitrite". Although it failed to win a prize, it proved to have great popular appeal.

Encouraged by this, he sought to make himself better known by offering to paint the Chapel of the Virgin at the 13th-century Church of Saint-Sauveur, without remuneration. The ceiling was especially noted, for what was described as its "unusual composition". His works there were short-lived however, as a reconstruction project that began in 1787 was interrupted by the Revolution and ended with the church being demolished.

He also created a painting for the Order of Minims at the Place des Vosges, representing Saint Francis of Paola crossing the sea with his companions. Shortly after, he executed two paintings in the secret chapel of the Sorbonne; a Saint Anthony and a Saint Hillary. King Louis owned a copy of his "Glory of the Angels", displayed at Versailles, and a Nativity scene in the Queen's private oratory

In 1733. he was appointed to a professorship at the Académie. The following year, he died suddenly from an unspecified "domestic accident".

== Gallery ==
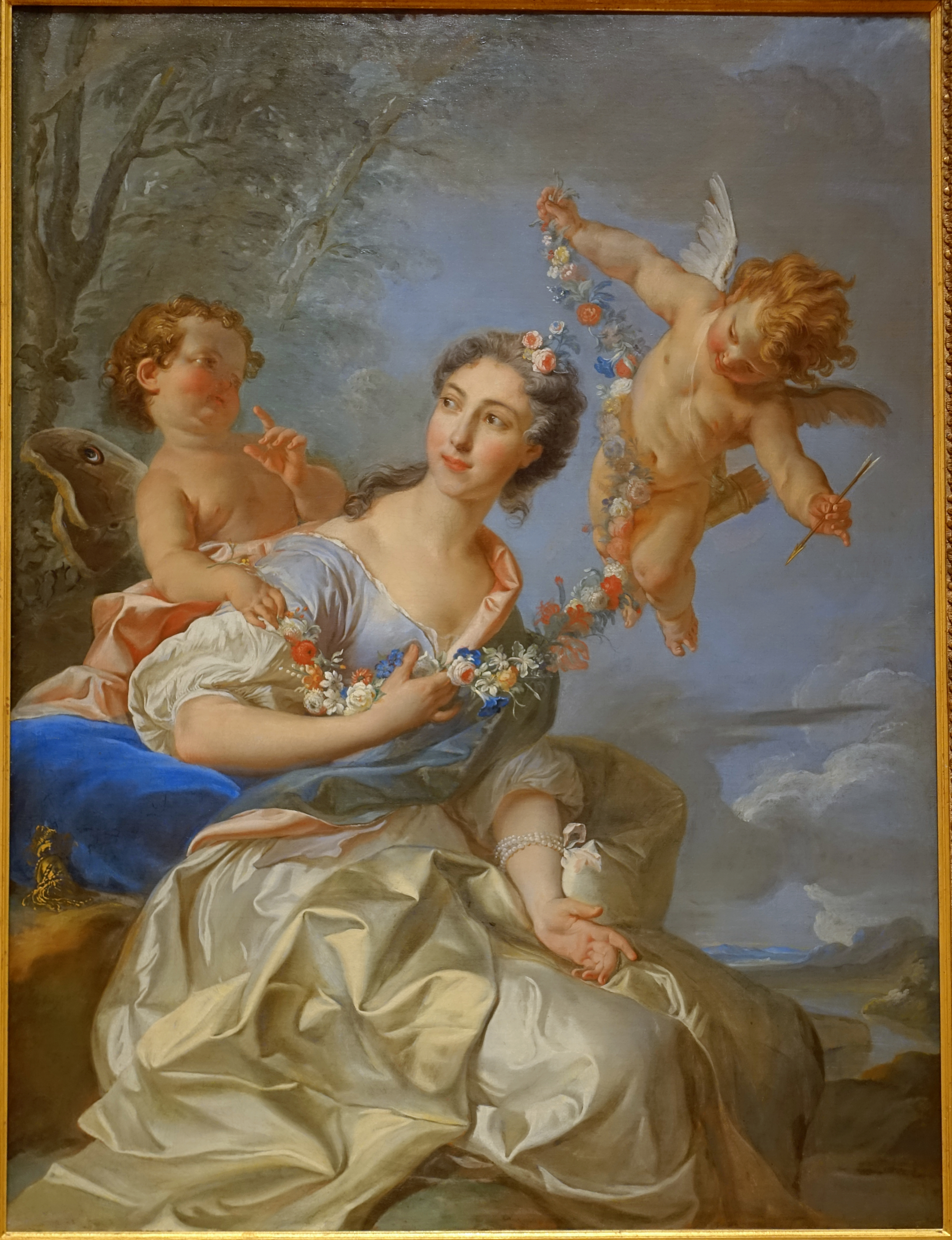
Portrait of Madame de Conti as Venus, 1731

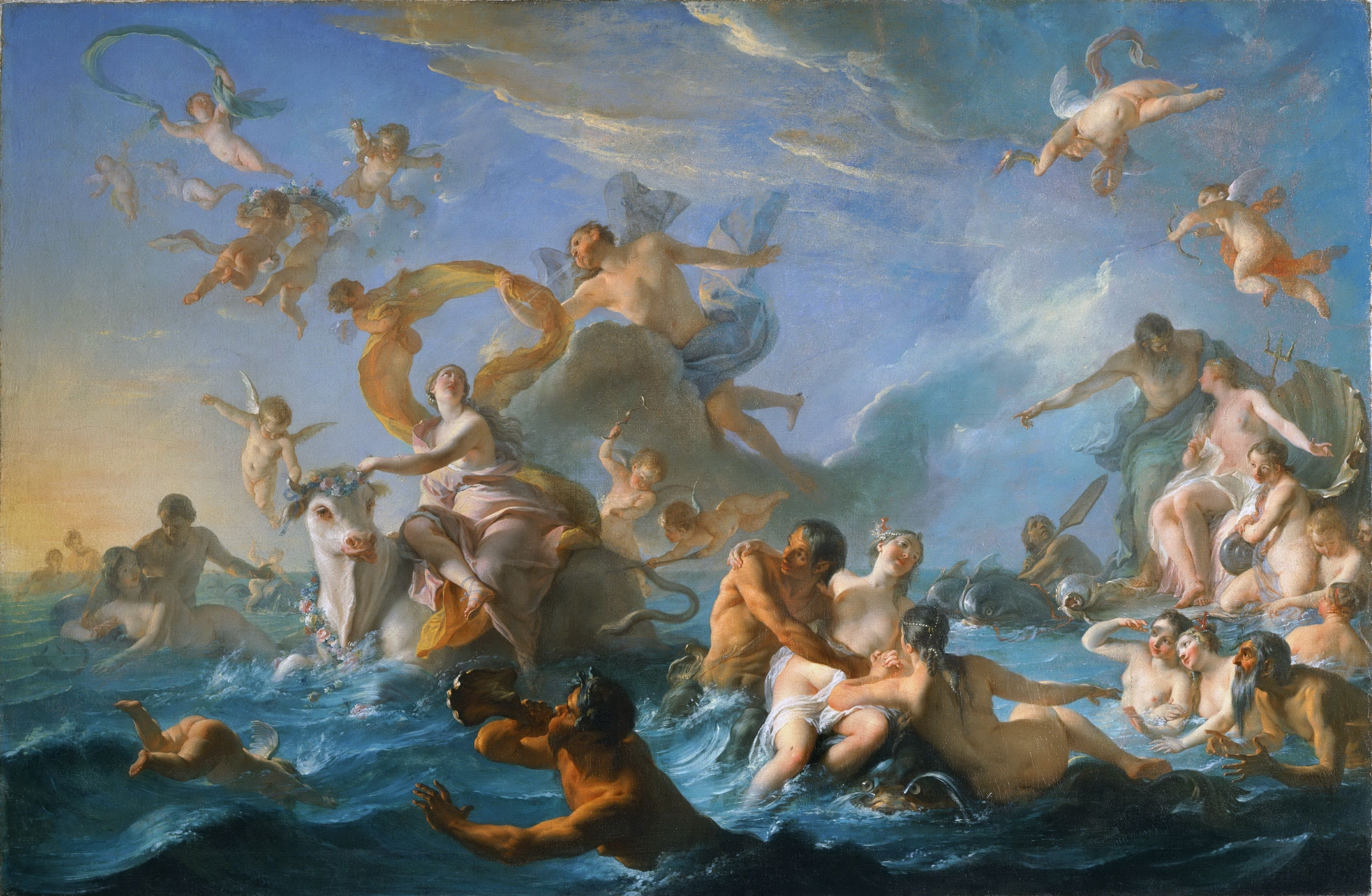
The Abduction of Europa, 1727

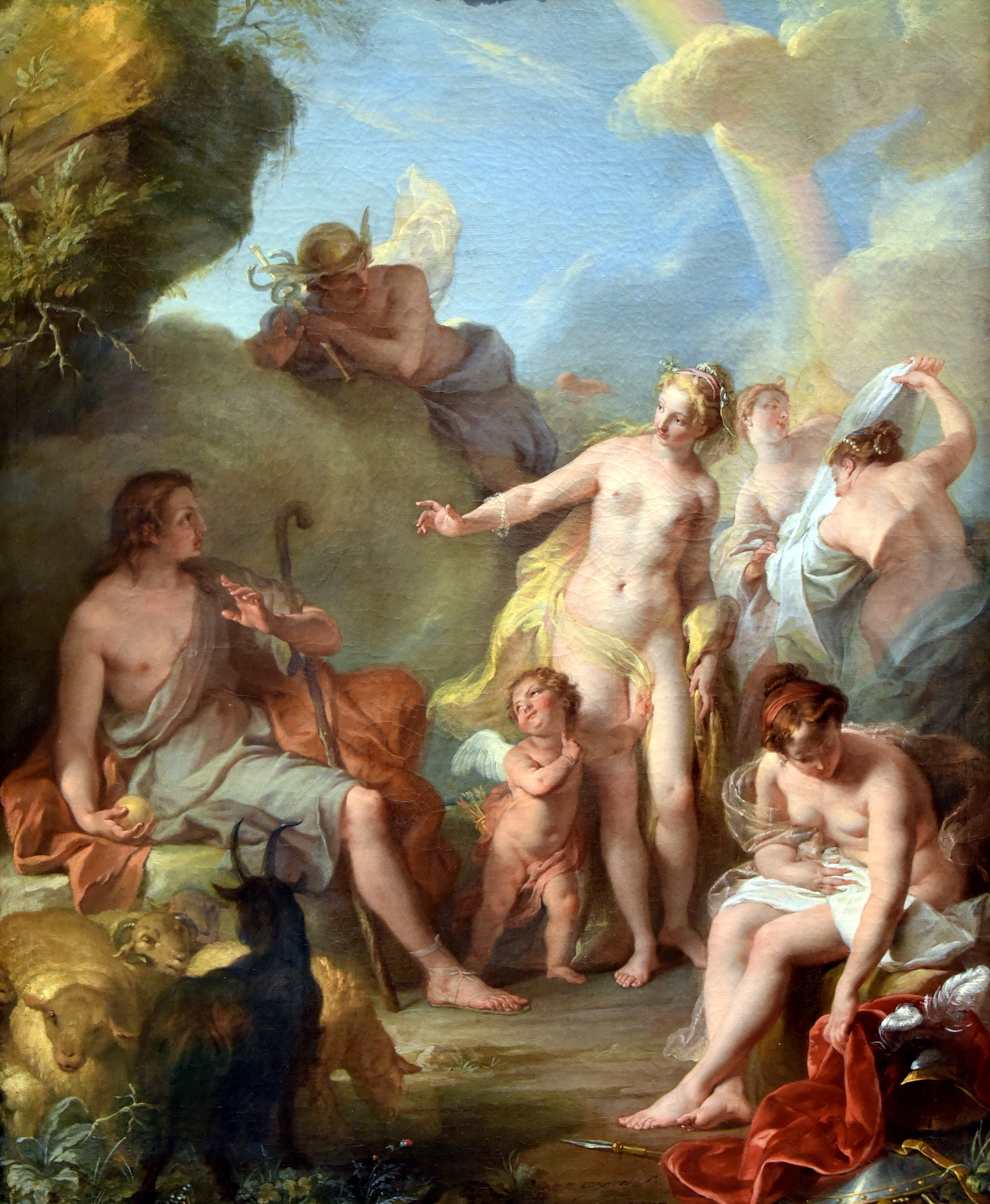
The Judgement of Paris, 1728

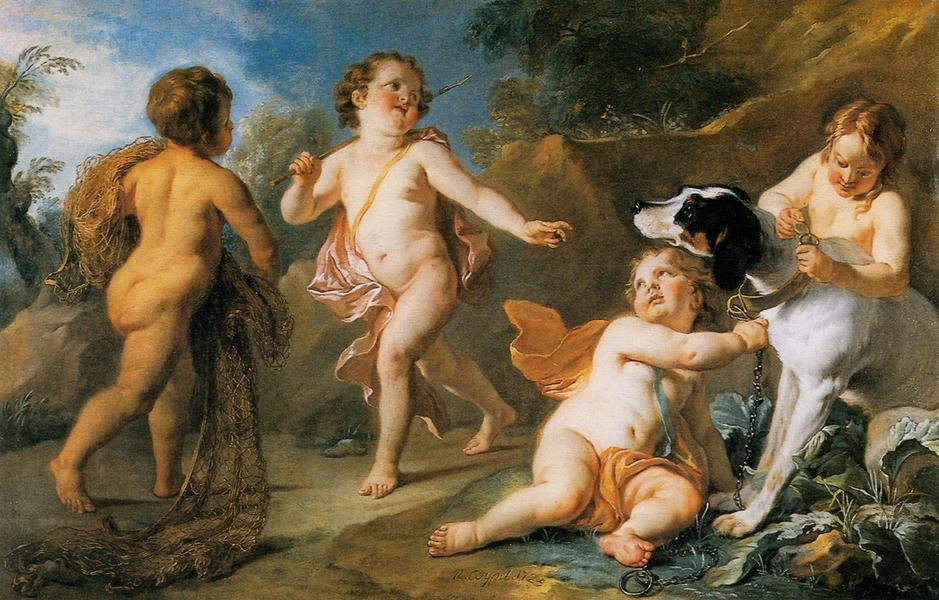
The Departure of the Hunt, 1725
