= Corneille Van Clève =

French sculptor (1646–1732)

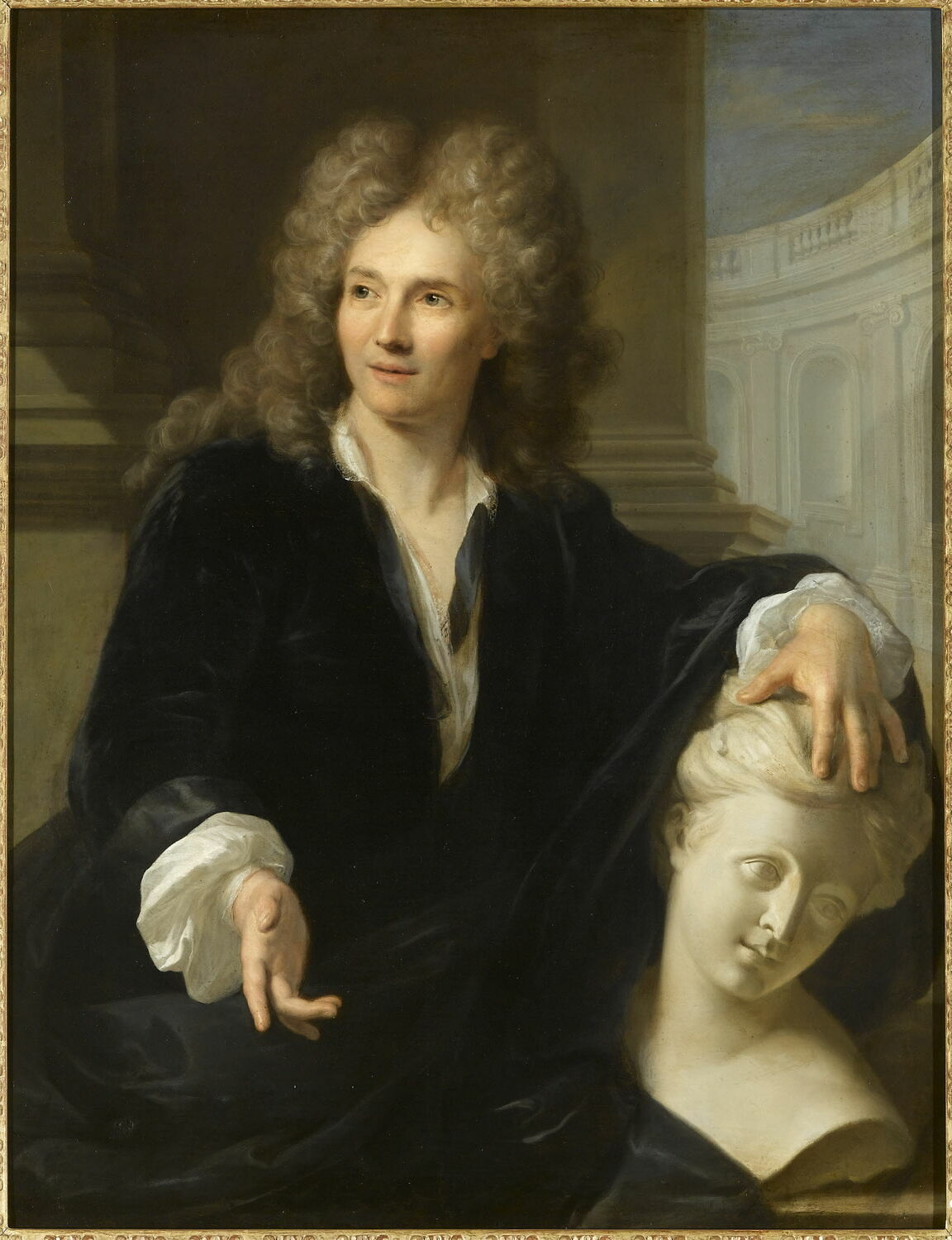
- Portrait of Clève from 1701 by Académie member Pierre Gobert
- Born: Paris, Kingdom of France
- Baptised: 10 June 1646
- Died: 31 December 1732 (aged 86); Paris, Kingdom of France
- Education: François Anguier
- Known for: Sculpture
- Spouse: Marie-Antoinette De Meaux de Vallicre
- Children: Josse Van Clève
- Awards: Prix de Rome (1671)
- Patrons: Louis XIV, Louis XV

Director of the Académie de Peinture et de Sculpture
- In office 1711–1714
- Monarch: Louis XIV
- Preceded by: François de Troy
- Succeeded by: Antoine Coypel

Corneille Van Clève (bapt. 10 June 1646 – 31 December 1735) was a French sculptor.

== Biography ==
Clève was born in Paris in 1646 to a family of Flemish goldsmiths and baptized on 10 June that year. His grandfather, a merchant goldsmith, immigrated to Paris from Flanders and was naturalized by King Henry IV in 1606. Cleve studied under French sculptor François Anguier and received the Prix de Rome scholarship in 1671.

After spending several years there at the French Academy in Rome, as well as three years in Venice, Clève returned to France in 1678. On 26 April 1681, he was formally accepted to the Académie de Peinture et de Sculpture upon submission of a marble statue of the Cyclops Polyphemus. Clève would be director of the Académie from 1711 to 1714. Clève enjoyed the patronage of both King Louis XIV and Louis XV, earning the King's pension until his death and sculpting numerous statues for the Palace at Versailles.

Clève married Marie-Antoinette De Meaux de Vallicre, half-sister of the famous goldsmith Nicolas de Launay, on 31 January 1682. She died in May 1683, just a few days after giving birth to their only son, Josse. He went on to become a sculptor, working in his father's workshop and earning several awards from the Académie, but would die on 4 June 1711.

Clève died during the night of 30-31 December 1732 following a long bout of illness that begun in April 1730.

== Selected works ==
- Polyphemus (1680-81) – The Louvre, Paris
- Work at Versailles Palace (1681-82) – Worked on the apartment of the Prince de Conti on the ground floor of the South Wing.
- Cleopatra or Sleeping Ariadne (1684-86) – Gardens of Versailles, Versailles
- Lion crushing a Wolf (1685-87) – Gardens of Versailles, Versailles
- Mercury (1685-87) – Gardens of Versailles, Versailles
- Cleopatra (1665-1700) – The Louvre, Paris
- Leda and the Swan (1685-1700) – The Louvre, Paris
- The Rivers Loire and Loiret (1699-1707) – The Louvre, Paris
- Psyche and Cupid (1700-1710) – National Museum of Western Art, Tokyo
- Venus and Cupid (1700-1710) – National Museum of Western Art, Tokyo
- Bacchus and Ariadne (1704 or before) – Exhibited at the Salon of 1704; Legion of Honor, San Francisco
- Sanctuary and High Altar (1709-10) – Chapel of Versailles, Versailles

== Gallery (partial) ==
Works by Corneille Van Clève

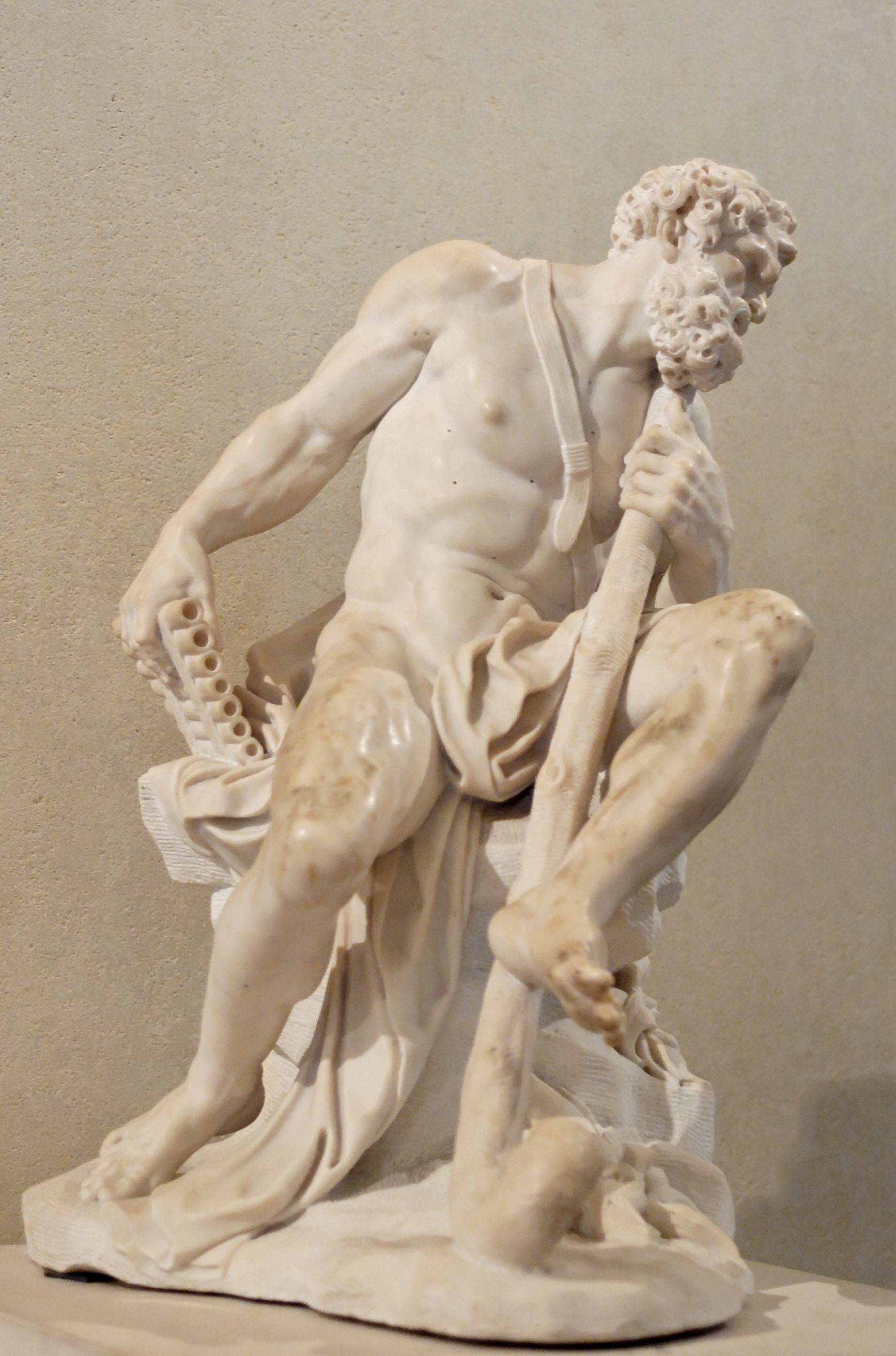
Polyphemus (1681)

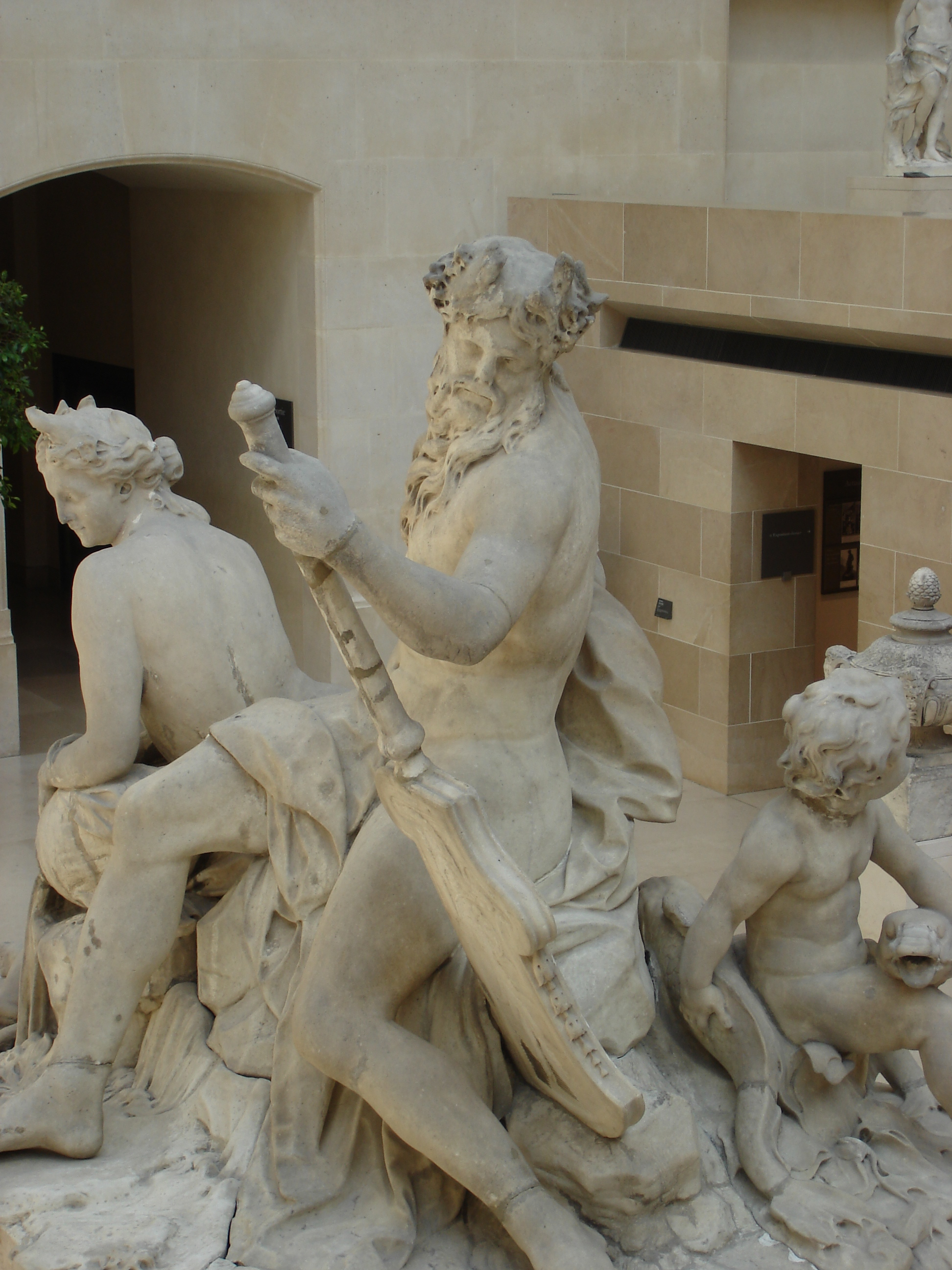
The Rivers Loire and Loiret (1699-1707)

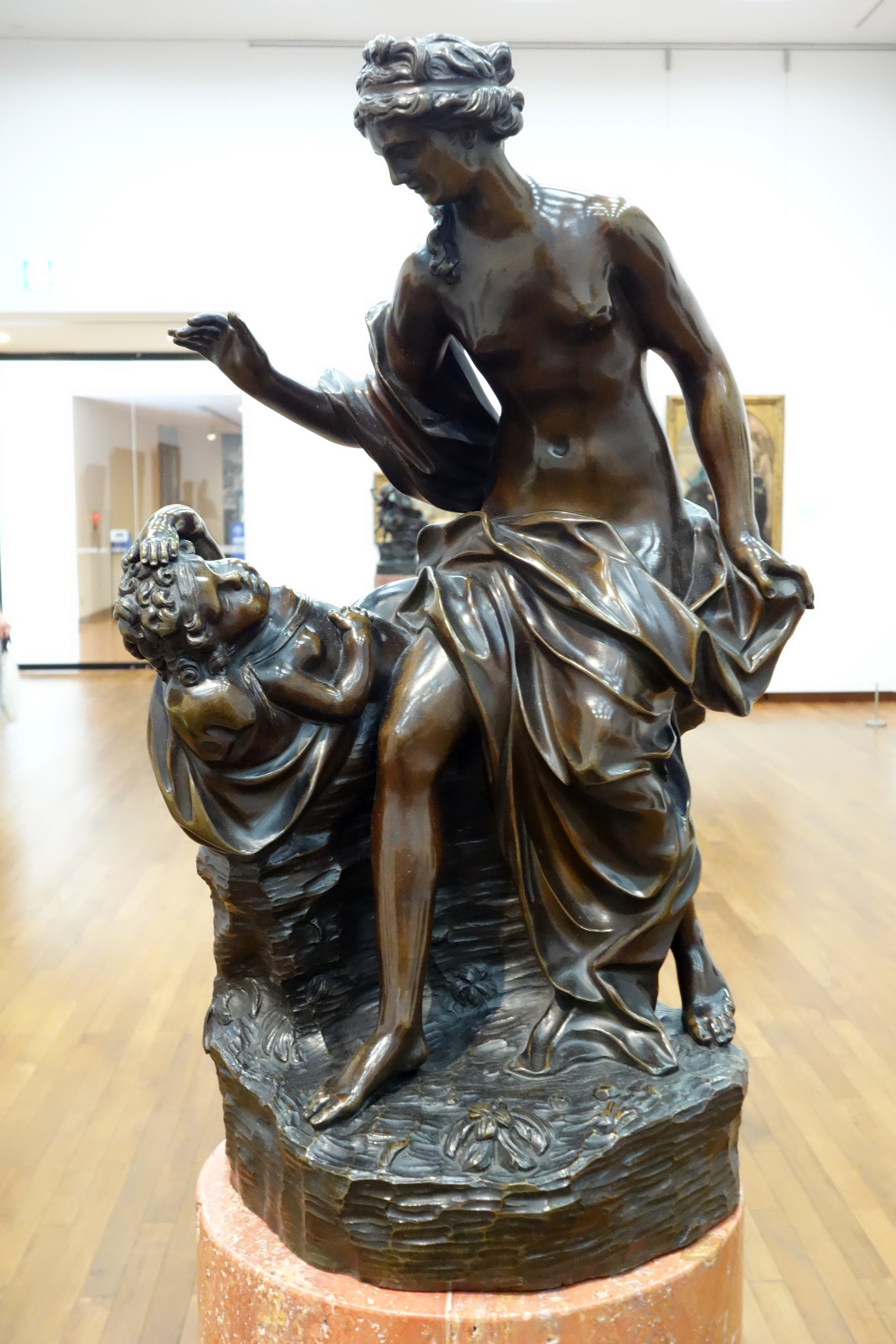
Psyche and Cupid (1700-1710)

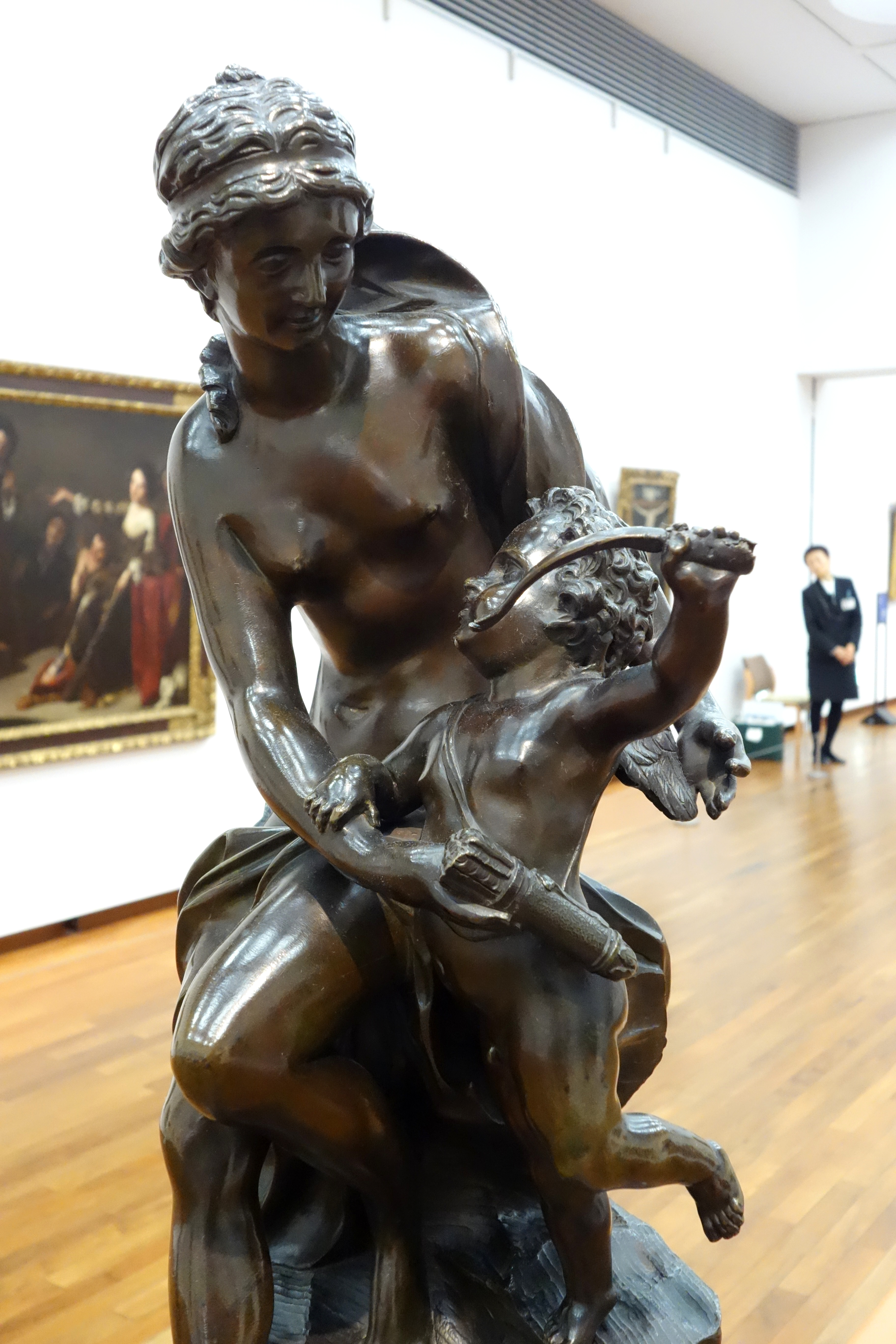
Venus and Cupid (1700-1710)
