= Geneviève-Françoise Randon de Malboissière =

French writer

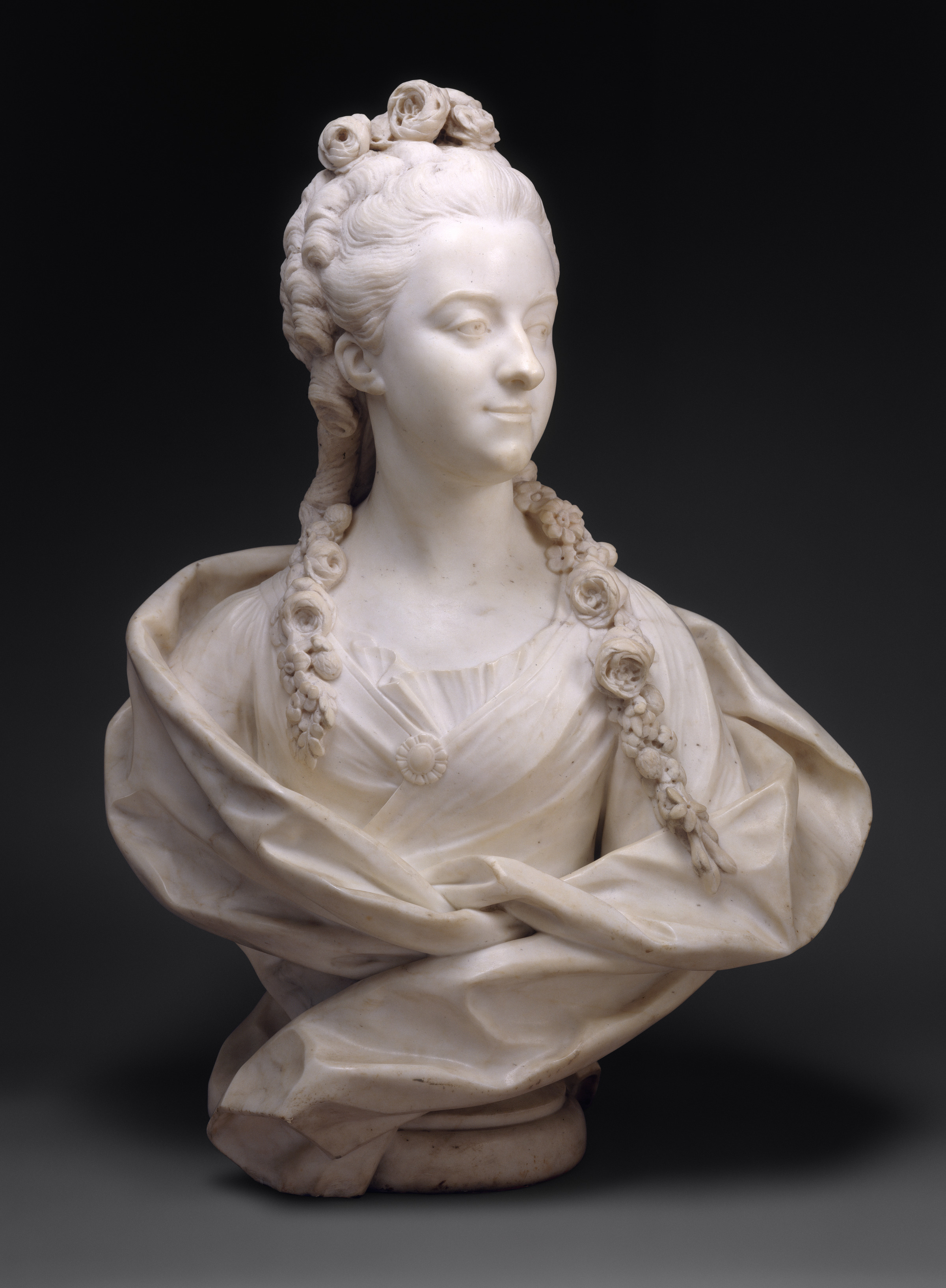
- Randon de Malboissière, c. 1768
- Born: 21 December 1746; Paris, France
- Died: 22 August 1766 (aged 19); Paris, France
- Other name: Laurette de Malboissière
- Occupations: Writer and multi-language translator

Geneviève-Françoise Randon de Malboissière, also known as Laurette de Malboissière (21 December 1746 – 22 August 1766) was a French-born poet, playwright, correspondent and multi-language translator.

== Biography ==
Geneviève-Françoise Randon de Malboissière was born into a well-off Paris family. Her father was Jean-Louis Randon de Malboissière (d. 7 October 1763), cashier of the sub-farms of aid and estates successively in Amiens, Soissons, and then Tours, and her mother was Françoise-Marie-Jeanne Picquefeu de Longpré, daughter of a secretary to the king, Louis XV. The couple lived in a private mansion on Rue de Paradis (Paradise Street) in Paris and raised three children: Geneviève-Françoise, the eldest, and two younger boys, Charles-Joseph Randon de Malboissière and Louis-Henri Randon de Malboissière, future Vicar general of Nantes.

Geneviève-Françoise, also known as Laurette de Malboissière, was tutored at home starting in natural history and mathematics as well as a number of languages in which she became fluent: German, English, Italian, Spanish, Greek and Latin. In 1764, she began lessons in drawing and dancing. Among her instructors was the naturalist Jacques-Christophe Valmont de Bomare who was hired to give her, and her cousins, a science education.

According to a letter written in 1762, her enthusiasm for the theater began at the age of five after attending a performance of Inès de Castro by Antoine Houdar de La Motte. Later, as a passionate theater-goer, she rented a box at the Comédie-Française three times a week and at the Comédie-Italienne as well as the famed Opéra Garnier, located at the Place de l'Opéra in Paris.

=== Avid reader ===
According to Sonnet, "In terms of reading, Geneviève 'devours,' closely following literary news and even getting banned books," which was a passion she shared with her mother. In correspondence, Geneviève wrote: "My mother is currently reading the Memoirs of M. d'Eon. What a madman, or rather what a reckless traitor! This work is forbidden and is not found in Paris; we have to bring it from England."

She goes on to say, "If censorship forces you to be tricky by getting your supplies under the coat, you should also know to read some books very quickly, before a possible condemnation." She wrote in letters to her childhood friend Adélaide Méliand, whose father was Councilor of State and whose family lived on the same block of the Marais neighborhood, that she learned this lesson in 1762 when the book she was reading was banned by judgment of the Parliament of Paris and was soon found to be "lacerated and burned."

=== Writer ===
Randon started writing by the age of 15 but reached her peak around 18, writing 33 known works in the last five years of her life. Having mastered multiple languages, she personally translated fragments of her favorite works, including The History of Scotland by William Robertson and The Origin and Advancement of the Arts and Sciences by David Hume.

For her writing, Randon drew from sources both new and old. Often, she applied herself to works, both French and foreign, that she read or saw on stage and about subjects that connected her to a wide range of genres. Her significant production was credited to her exposure to a vast library of literary and theatrical culture, as well as her mastery of multiple contemporary and ancient languages.

Her writings included translations, natural history works, a dozen poems scattered throughout her correspondence, and above all plays, which for the most part, were read aloud in small gatherings or performed in society. Among her plays were at least twelve comedies, four tragedies, a pastoral, an opera libretto and a fragment of a comic opera. However, only two of her works have been published: the comedy Ilphis and Zulie, published in 1766; and her correspondence, collected posthumously and published many years later in 1866 and in 1925.

During her lifetime, Randon gained international renown and the admiration of established writers Friedrich Melchior Grimm and David Hume.

At the age of 18, (about 1764), she fell in love with Jean-Louis Dutartre, son of a Châtelet notary, but they never married.

=== Death ===
Randon died at her home on Rue de Paradis of measles on 22 August 1766, just two months shy of her 20th birthday, and almost a year after the death of her fiancé (20 October 1765) from the same disease. Shortly after her death, noted author Friedrich Melchior Grimm marked the sad occasion in his correspondence as "a loss that deserves to be noticed."

Only two of her works were published, both posthumously: the comedy Ilphis et Zulie (1766), published in a collection of texts by her former German tutor, Michaël Huber; as well as some of her correspondence with her childhood friend Adélaide Méliand. Between November 1763 and December 1765, Randon was known to have sent up to 10 letters each month to Méliand. The correspondence, published in 1866 and 1925, contained 295 exchanged letters, written between 19 August 1761 and Randon's death in 1766.

== Selected works ==
=== Published work ===
- 1766: Ilphis and Zulie (a comedy in one act)
- 1866: Laurette de Malboissière: lettres d'une jeune fille du temps de Louis XV (Laurette de Malboissière: Letters of a young girl from the time of Louis XV) (1761-1766) (correspondence)
- 1925: An au xviii ^{e} century. Letters from Geneviève de Malboissière to Adélaide Méliand (1761-1766) (correspondence)

=== Unpublished work ===
Private archives of the Marquis de Luppé, Château de Beaurepaire, Department of Oise (France): Méliand and La Grange fonds:

- 1761: Translation of Cato by Joseph Addison, 43 p. in-8.
- 1763: Translation of the beginning of the History of Alexandre de Quinte-Curce (l. III, ch. I-IX), 31 p. in-8, unpublished.
- 1764: Translation of From the origin and progress of the arts and sciences, by David Hume, 27 p. in-8.
- 1764: Translation of the beginning of the History of Scotland by William Robertson, 14 p. in-fol, unpublished.
- nd: Sketches of songs and small verses.
- nd: Fragments of Grégoire, cobbler, (comic opera).
- nd: Translation of the beginning of the Arcadia, by Jacopo Sannazaro,

Unpublished works referenced in her letters but not yet found.

- 1762: Translation into English of the Manners of Saurin's time.
- 1762: Translation into Italian and Spanish of the Natural Son of Diderot.
- 1762: English translation of L'époux par supercherie de Boissy.
- 1763: Medea (tragedy in verse).
- 1764: The grieving wife (tragedy in verse).
- 1764: The Happy Heiress (Miss Melliand's comedy reduced by five acts in two).
- 1764: A tender engagement goes further than we think, (comedy).
- 1764: The force of education, (comedy based on the novel by Father Aunillon).
- 1764: The young widow (comedy).
- 1764: The exchange (comedy).
- 1764: The dream (comedy).
- 1764: Chloris (comedy in two acts).
- 1764: Elfrida (heroic comedy in three acts, from L'Histoire de la maison de Plantagenet de Hume).
- 1764: The generous rival (comedy).
- 1764: The speech of Adam and Eve.
- 1764: Farewell to Hector and Andromache (date uncertain).
- 1764: Amanda, November (date uncertain).
- 1765: Jeanne Gray (tragedy in verse).
- 1765: Antigone (tragedy in verse).
- 1765: The blind man (comedy in five scenes), from a tale by Mme Riccoboni.
- 1765: Daphnis and Laurette (pastoral in one act and prose after Gessner).
- 1765: Palmir and Nisa (opera).
- 1765: Writings on Natural History, reviewed by Valmont de Bomare.

== Tributes ==
- A marble bust of Randon was sculpted by Jean-Baptiste Lemoyne in 1768 that is preserved at the Metropolitan Museum of Art in New York. The museum notes that her bust includes a rose laurel garland in tribute to the character, named Laurette, who appeared in a pastoral play written by Randon.
- From page 106, Correspondence littéraire, philosophique et critique, by Grimm, Diderot, Raynal, Meister, éd. M. Tourneux, Paris, Garnier Frères, 1877–1882, t. VII [sept 1766]):

“We recently made a loss that deserves to be noticed. Miss Randon de Malboissière has just died at the flower of her age. She was about eighteen or nineteen years old. […] She was already famous in Paris for her knowledge. She understood and perfectly understood seven languages, namely: Greek, Latin, Italian, Spanish, French, German and English; she spoke modern languages perfectly. Her parents are said to be inconsolable about the loss, and it's easy to understand."

== External sources ==
- Gargam, Adeline, "Geneviève de Malboissière (1746-1766): a young polygraph in the 18th century," in Between erudition and creation, dir. P. Hummel, Paris, Ed. Philologicum, 2013, p. 77-93.
- Sonnet, Martine, "The Knowledge of a Quality Young Lady: Geneviève de Randon de Malboissière." in Memoire dell 'Academia delle Scienze di Torino Classe di Scienze Morali storiche e filologiche, 3, 2000, vol. 24, p. 167-185.
