= Jean-Louis Lemoyne =

French sculptor

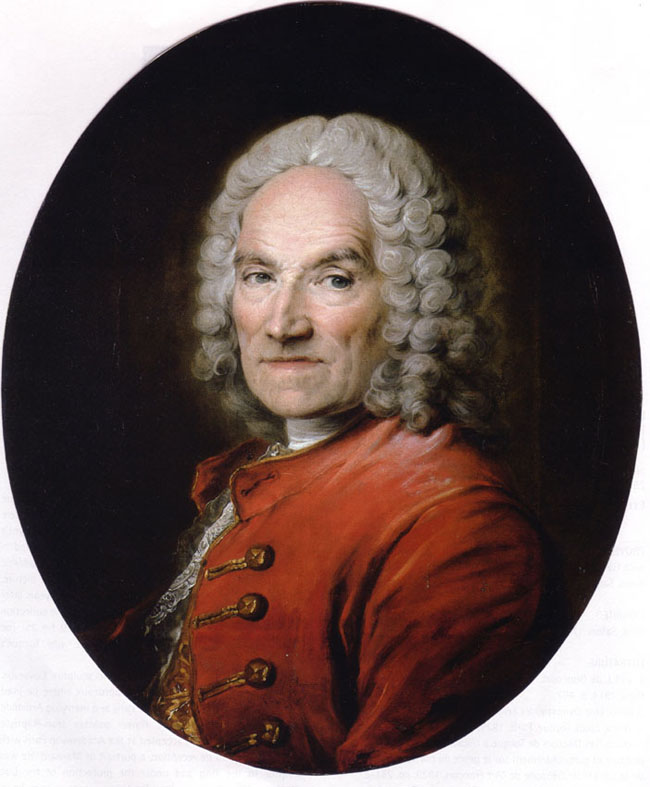
Portrait of Jean-Louis Lemoyne by Louis Tocqué - private collection

Jean-Louis Lemoyne (French pronunciation: [ʒɑ̃ lwi ləmwan]; 1665–1755) was a French sculptor whose works were commissioned by Louis XIV and Louis XV.

His sculptures are featured in major art museums, including the Louvre, the Metropolitan Museum of Art, the Frick Collection, the Museum of Fine Arts, and the National Gallery of Art. Lemoyne was the pupil of Antoine Coysevox.

His son Jean-Baptiste Lemoyne was also a noted sculptor.

== Works ==
- La Crainte des Traits de l'Amour - Metropolitan Museum of Art
- A Companion of Diana - National Gallery of Art
- Jean-Louis Lemoyne in American public collections, on the French Sculpture Census website
- Jacques-Rolland Moreau, 1712, Museum of Fine Arts, Boston
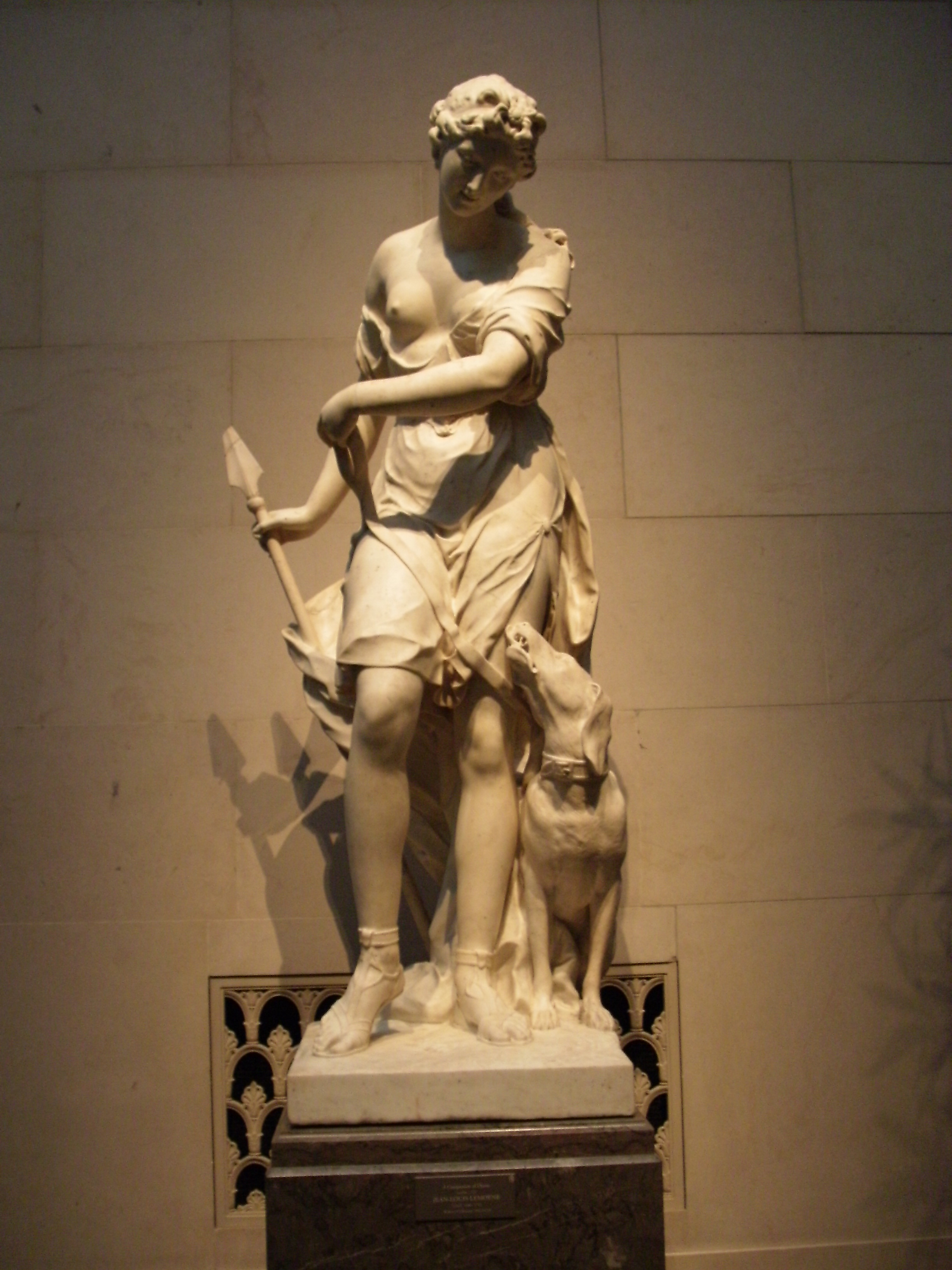
Companion of Diana, marble of 1726, in the National Gallery of Art

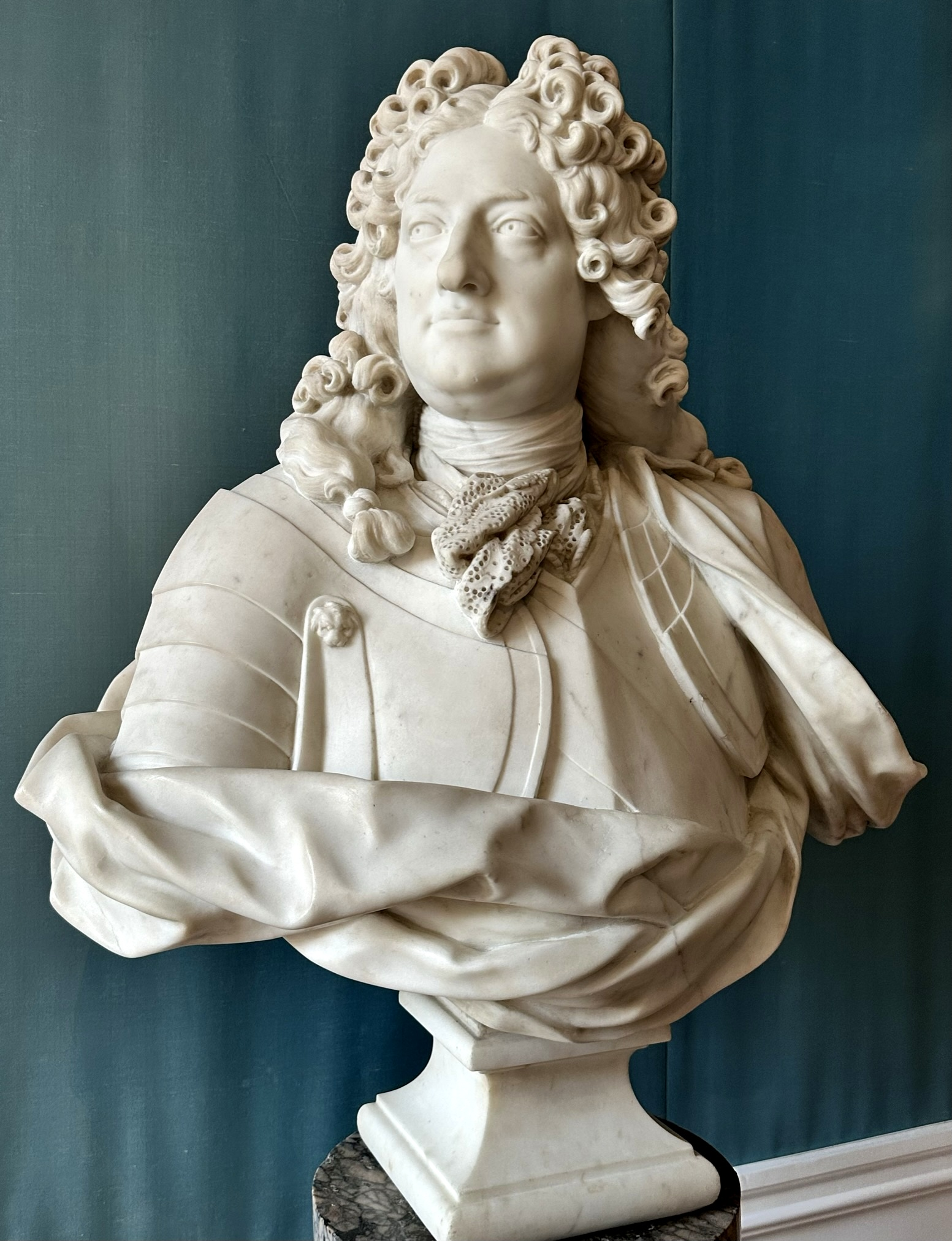
Bust of Philippe II, Duke of Orléans, 1713, in the Palace of Versailles
