= Robert Le Lorrain =

French sculptor (1666–1743)

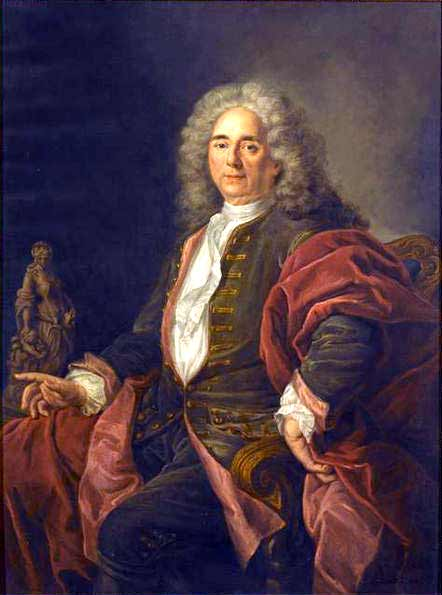
Portrait by Hubert Drouais, 1730

Robert Le Lorrain (1666–1743) was a French baroque sculptor. He was born in Paris into a family of bureaucrats, the son of Claude Le Lorrain, a business agent of Nicolas Fouquet, Louis XIV's Minister of Finance. Le Lorrain was a student of the French sculptor, painter, and architect, Pierre Paul Puget (1620–1694). At age eighteen, Le Lorrain entered François Girardon's studio; aside from collaborating with him, he was commissioned to instruct Girardon's children in drawing and to supervise his other pupils. Le Lorrain won the Prix de Rome in 1689, On his return to Paris he first joined the Académie de Saint-Luc, and then was received into the Académie royale de peinture et de sculpture (Royal Academy of Painting and Sculpture in Paris) in 1701; he became Rector of the Académie in 1737. His major non-royal clients were members of the house of Rohan. His students included Jean-Baptiste Lemoyne (1704–1778) and Jean-Baptiste Pigalle (1714–1785). Robert Le Lorrain died in Paris in 1743.

Disappointingly few works by this highly accomplished master have survived. His best-known work is the stone relief, The Horses of the Sun, over the stable doors at the Hôtel de Rohan, Paris; sculptures executed in 1718-21 for the Cardinal de Rohan at the Château de Saverne were lost in the fire in the château in 1779, but sculptures for the palais Rohan, Strasbourg, survive. Though Le Lorrain's works for Marly have been dispersed or lost, as have church monuments in Paris and Orléans, sculpture in the chapel at Versailles survives. The Courtauld Institute of Art (London), the Honolulu Museum of Art, the J. Paul Getty Museum (Los Angeles), the Liechtenstein Museum (Vienna), the Louvre, and the National Gallery of Art (Washington D.C.), and are among the public collections holding sculpture by Robert Le Lorrain. He is known to have been a prolific draughtsman: no drawings securely attributed to him survive.
