= Coustou =

Coustou is the name of a family of French sculptors:

- Nicolas Coustou (1658–1733)
- Guillaume Coustou the Elder (1677–1746)
- Guillaume Coustou the Younger (1716–1777)
