= Quatremère de Quincy =

French archaeologist, architect and writer (1755–1849)

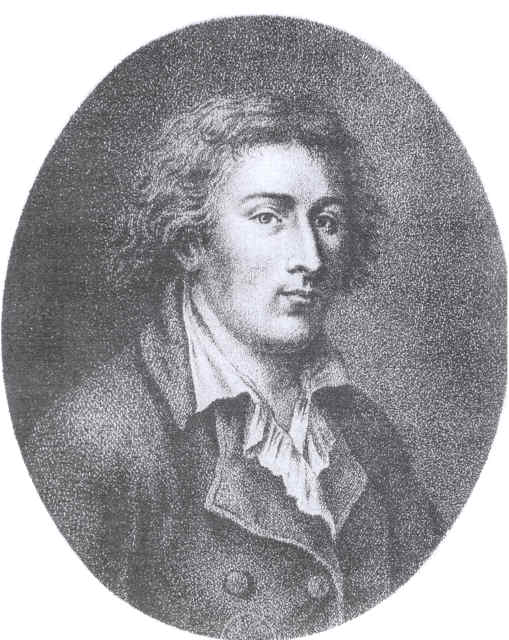
Quatremère de Quincy, stipple engraving by François Bonneville

Antoine-Chrysostome Quatremère de Quincy (21 October 1755 – 28 December 1849) was a French armchair archaeologist and architectural theorist, a Freemason, and an effective arts administrator and influential writer on art.

== Life ==
Antoine-Chrysostome Quatremère de Quincy was born in Paris, France on 21 October 1755. His family was wealthy and were practicing Jansenists. He trained for the law and then followed courses in art and history at the Collège Louis-le-Grand. He apprenticed as a sculptor in the studio of Guillaume Coustou the Younger where his principle teacher was Coustou’s pupil Pierre Julien. His interests turned archaeology and the arts of antiquity during multiple excursions to Italy. He lived in Rome from 1776 to 1780, and again in 1783-1784 where he befriended the sculptor Antonio Canova. In 1789 he took a trip to Naples in the company of Jacques-Louis David.

Quatremère de Quincy relocated to Paris where by 1786 he was a respected aesthetician and art critic. A year earlier he won a contest sponsored by the Académie des Inscriptions et Belles-Lettres for his essay on the origins and nature of Egyptian architecture. In 1788 he began working on his Dictionnaire historique de l'Architecture; a work which he would not complete until 1825. It was published in 1832–1833. His writings also extended into music; beginning with a 1789 article on opera buffa, "De la nature des opéras bouffons italiens", which was published in the Mercure de France. Italian opera buffa at that time was controversial in France, and he subsequently wrote a dissertation calling for a return of the Bouffonistes; a disbanded Italian opera troupe.

He was involved in the troubles of the French Revolution. During the Revolution of 1789 he was the mastermind behind the re-envisioning of the Church of Saint Genevieve into the Panthéon, a mausoleum for the nation’s new heroes (1791–4). He was a royalist in the National Legislative Assembly of 1791–1792, and his politics were monarchist and Catholic. As a member of the Revolutionary Committee of Public Instruction his set of three Considerations on the arts of design in France was offered before the Assemblée Nationale at a time (1791) when the continuation of the former academies was under question; he offered a program for their reform. in part by opening up the Paris Salons. In 1791–1792 he orchestrated the conversion of the Church of Ste-Geneviève in Paris (under the direction of Jean-Baptiste Rondelet) into the Panthéon, infilling the windows to give it the character of a mausoleum. In 1795 he was accused of taking part in the preparations for the royalist insurrection of 13 Vendémiaire and condemned to death, but subsequently acquitted.

In July 1796, he wrote a pseudo-epistolary treatise against the French plans to seize works of art from Rome, arguing that European powers should instead contribute a sum to the papacy for protecting art and knowledge. Quatremère was hiding when he wrote the Letters because he was sentenced to death for his role in the royalist uprising of 13 Vendémiaire. He argued that ‘displacing the monuments of Italy’ and ‘dismantling its schools and museums’ would destroy ‘civilization’ [Gilks 2022: 489, 492]. He wrote to show that ‘it would be in the interests of the arts to insist that we do not export from Italy different masterpieces’ and to render ‘the justice to the pontifical government in merits from the zeal and care it has constantly demonstrated toward research into the arts and their conservation’ [Gilks 2022: 491]. According to Gilks, Quatremère wrote in a contrived manner that he intended to appeal to republican readers: he therefore aped Condorcet’s Sketch and its notion of civilization that was then dear to the Directorial regime and cited writers approved by the Directory [Gilks 2022: 497].

Shortly afterward, he was behind a petition signed by forty-seven Parisian artists including Jacques-Louis David which questioned the benefits of displacing art from Rome; although prudently worded, there was a vituperative official response.

In 1797, he was elected to the Council of Five Hundred for the Seine department, then went into hiding after the Fructidor coup. In exile in Germany, he read Immanuel Kant and Gotthold Lessing, whose philosophy informed his own theories of aesthetics. In 1800, back in Paris, he was appointed secretary general of the Seine council. From 1816 until 1839 he was perpetual secretary to the Académie des Beaux-Arts, which gave him great influence upon official architecture, and in 1818 he became a professor of archaeology at the Bibliothèque Nationale. He briefly returned to politics in 1820. In 1826 he became an associated member of the Royal Institute of the Netherlands.

Quatremère de Quincy was the author of numerous articles and books. He wrote the three Architecture volumes of the Encyclopédie Méthodique. He wrote biographies of several artists: Antonio Canova (1823), Raphael (1824) and Michelangelo (1835).

He transformed the simple metaphor of architecture as language into a framework for reconceptualizing the structure of architecture; modern writers describing "vernacular" architecture, or the Baroque "idiom" or the "vocabulary" of Classicism owe a debt to Quatremère de Quincy.

His essay De l'Architecture Égyptienne, written for a competition posed by the Académie des Inscriptions et Belles-Lettres in 1785 and published in 1803, just as the Description de l'Egypte was in preparation, nevertheless was an important influence on the Egyptian Revival phase of Neoclassical architecture, for its theoretical observations concerning the origins of architecture rather than for its historical naiveté. He was among the first to point out the use of polychromy in Greek sculpture and architecture. Though he insisted that landscape gardening could not be admitted among the fine arts, he was a key figure in the establishment of the first landscaped cemeteries, and his essay, translated into English as The Nature, the End and the Means of Imitation in the Fine Arts influenced J. C. Loudon.

== Sources ==
- Lavin, Sylvia (1992). Quatremère de Quincy and the Invention of a Modern Language of Architecture. MIT Press.
- Gilks, David (2022). "Civilization and Its Discontents: Quatremère de Quincy and Directorial Political Culture". French Historical Studies. 45 (3).
- Gilks, David (2024). Quatremère de Quincy: Art and Politics during the French Revolution. Oxford: Oxford University Press. ISBN 9780198745563.
