= Claude Dejoux =

French sculptor (1732–1816)

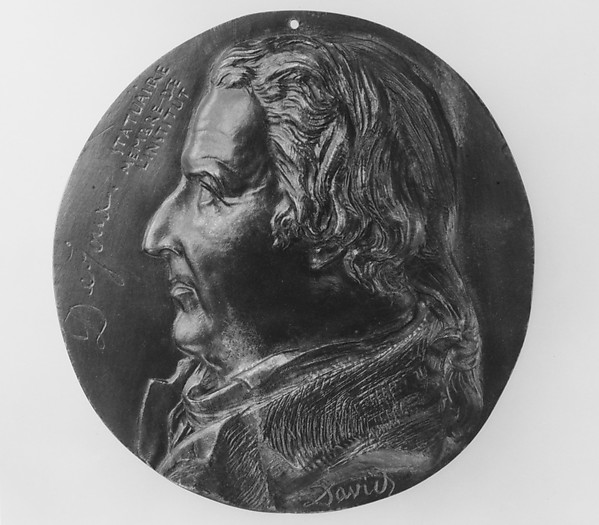
- Claude Dejoux. Medallion by David d'Angers
- Born: 23 January 1732; Vadans, Jura, France
- Died: 18 October 1816 (aged 84); Paris, France
- Occupation: Sculptor

Claude Dejoux (23 January 1732 – 18 October 1816) was a French sculptor.

== Early years ==
Claude Dejoux was born on 23 January 1732 in Vadans, Jura.

Descended from the Counts of Joux, Claude Dejoux was born into a family of poor farmers. He started work as a shepherd, but was soon apprenticed to a carpenter due to his love of sculpture. He was apprenticed to the sculptor Guillaume Coustou the Younger (1716–1777), where he met Pierre Julien (1731–1804). He became a close friend of Julien. Dejoux was accepted by the Academy in 1778, and in 1779 was named Academician. His morceau de réception for the academy was a marble sculpture of Saint Sébastien, 1.05 metres (3 ft 5 in) high, now held in the Louvre. He became sculptor to King Louis XVI.

== Republic and empire ==
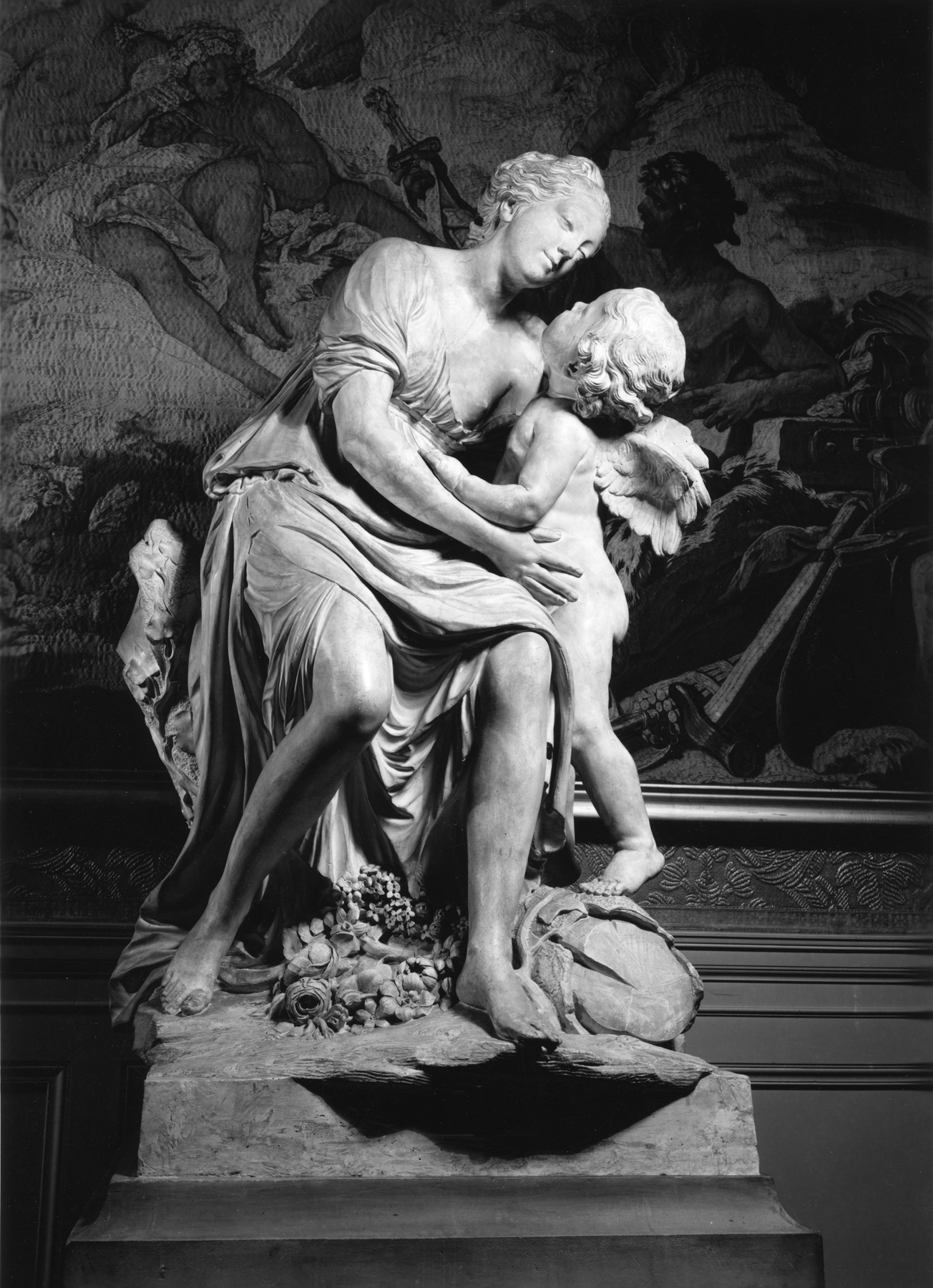
Love and Friendship (1783)

The French Revolution began in 1789. In 1792 Dejoux was made an adjunct professor. In 1795 he became a member of the newly formed Institut de France. He was commissioned by the French First Republic to make a sculpture of Calinat, which is now held by the Louvre. Dejoux was professor of David d'Angers, and supported him when he applied for a scholarship from the town of Angers.

After Julien's death in 1804, Dejoux made a mausoleum ornamented with his portrait, which was erected in the garden of the Musée des monuments français. In 1815 this monument was transported to the Père Lachaise Cemetery. Dejoux was made a knight of the Legion of Honour. In 1805–07 he made a bronze statue to General Louis Desaix. The monument was erected in the Place des Victoires in 1810. It was destroyed in 1814 during the Bourbon Restoration.

Claude Dejoux died on 18 October 1816 in Paris, aged 84.

== Works ==
A partial list:

- Saint Sébastien, marble statuette (1779), Paris, Louvre
- Portrait of Marie-Christine Brignole, Princess of Monaco (1739–1813), terracotta bust (1783), Paris, Louvre
- Statue that crowns the dome of the Pantheon, Paris
- His sculptures for the facade of the Pavillon de Place des Victoires in Paris were destroyed during the Second French Empire. All that remains is a fragment of marble bas-relief of Charity (1788)
- His monument of General Desaix (1808) for the Place des Victoires in Paris was destroyed in 1814.

== Pupils ==
Pupils included:

- David d'Angers (1788–1856)
- Charles-René Laitié (1782–1862)
- François-Frédéric Lemot (1772–1827)
- Nicolas-Pierre Tiolier (1784–1853)

== Sources ==
- Jay, A.; Jouy, E.; Arnault, Antoine-Vincent (1825). Biographie nouvelle des contemporains, ou dictionnaire historique et raisonné de tous les hommes qui, depuis la Révolution française, ont acquis de la célébrité par leurs actions, leurs écrtis, leurs erreurs ou leurs crimes, soit en France, soit dans les pays étrangers. Librairie historique.
- Johns, Christopher M. S. (1998). Antonio Canova and the Politics of Patronage in Revolutionary and Napoleonic Europe. University of California Press. ISBN 978-0-520-21201-5.
- "Le sculpteur Claude Dejoux (1732 1816)". Histoire. Mairie de Vadans.
- "Marie-Christine Brignole, princesse de Monaco (1739 - 1813)". Louvre. 1783.
- Michaud, Louis-Gabriel (1818). Biographie universelle, ancienne et moderne, ou histoire, par ordre alphabétique, de la vie publique ou privée de tous les hommes qui se sont fait remarquer par leurs écrits, leurs actions, leurs talents, leurs vertus ou leurs crimes. chez L.-G. Michaud.
- Reinis, J. G. (1999). The Portrait Medallions of David DÁngers: An Illustrated Catalogue of Davidś Contemporary and Retrospective Portraits in Bronze. Polymath Press. ISBN 978-0-937370-01-8.
- "Saint Sébastien". Louvre. 1779.
- Worley, Michael Preston (2003). Pierre Julien: Sculptor to Queen Marie-Antoinette. iUniverse. ISBN 978-0-595-29471-8.
