= Henri Bertini =

French composer and pianist

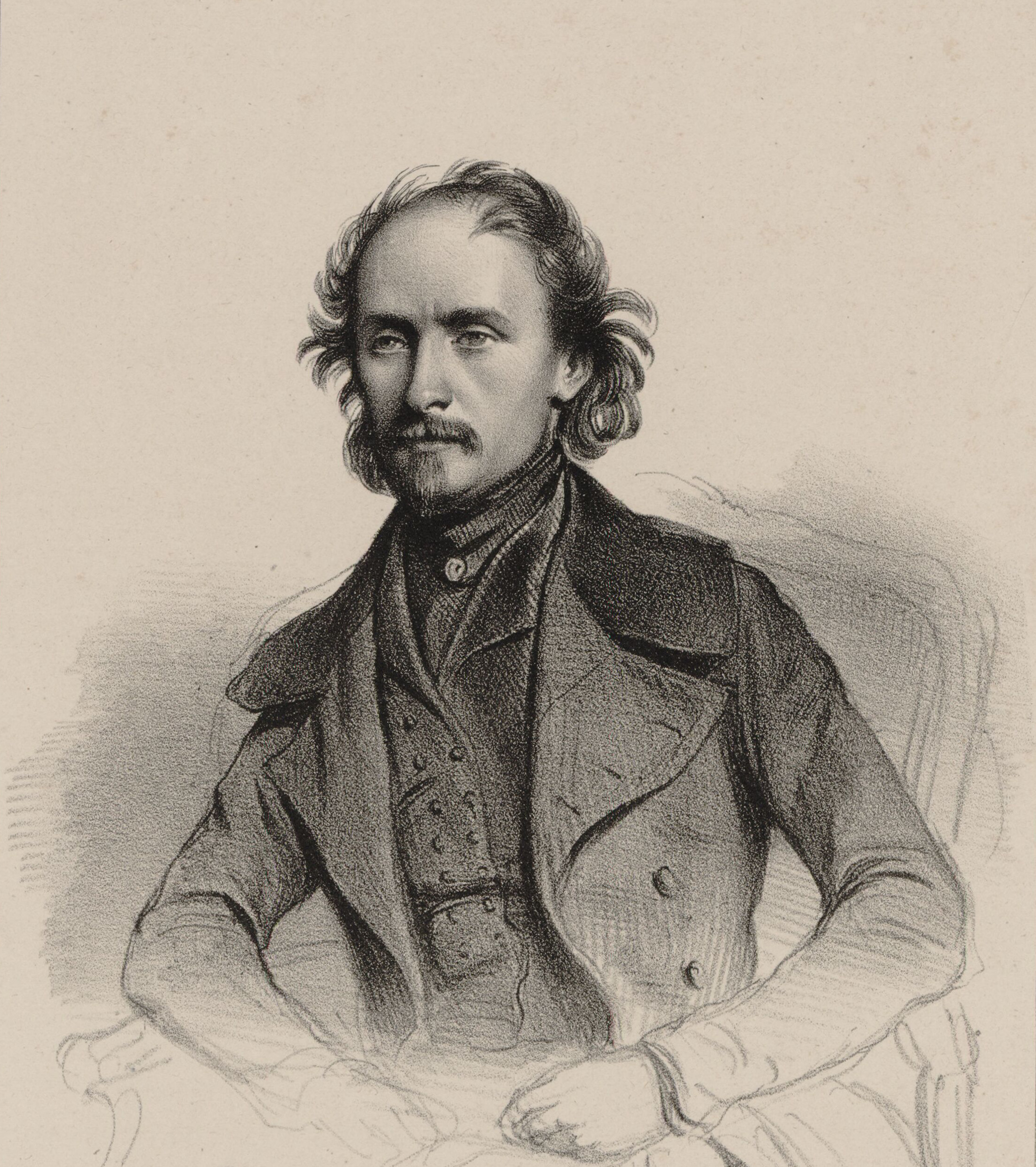
Henri Jérôme Bertini

Henri Jérôme Bertini (28 October 1798 – 30 September 1876) was a French classical composer and pianist. He was born into a family of musicians and attracted the attention of François-Joseph Fétis when he toured Europe as a child prodigy. As an adult he was admired both as a soloist and as a chamber musician; it was said that he played with Johann Nepomuk Hummel's simplicity and elegance without sacrificing the brilliance of the instrument. As a composer he had an original style that was rich in musical ideas, attractive melodies, and effortless harmonies. In 1856, he retired from the music scene and settled in the Dauphiné in south-east France.

== Life ==
Henri Jérôme Bertini was born in London on 28 October 1798 but his family returned to Paris six months later. He received his early musical education from his father, a pianist and composer himself, and his elder brother, Auguste, who was a pupil of Muzio Clementi. He was considered a child prodigy and at the age of 12 his father took him on a tour of England, Holland, Flanders, and Germany where he was enthusiastically received. After studies in composition in England and Scotland he was appointed professor of music in Brussels but returned to Paris in 1821. It is known that Bertini gave a concert with Franz Liszt in the Salons Pape on 20 April 1828. The program included a transcription by Bertini of Beethoven's Symphony No. 7 in A major for eight hands (the other pianists were Sowinsky and Ludwig Schunke). He was also admired as a chamber music performer, giving concerts with his friends Antoine Fontaine (violin) and Auguste Franchomme (cello). He remained active in and around Paris until around 1856, where he retired to Meylan (near Grenoble). At Meylan he lived by himself, stopped composing and performing in public, and became a leader of an orpheonist group (men's recreational choir).

Bertini concertized widely but was not as celebrated a virtuoso as either Friedrich Kalkbrenner or Henri Herz. One of his contemporaries described his playing as having Clementi's evenness and clarity in rapid passages as well as the quality of sound, the manner of phrasing, and the ability to make the instrument sing characteristic of the school of Hummel and Ignaz Moscheles. Thomas Tapper wrote:

He was in his time a shining example of the most admirable qualities of an artist. Living in an age of garish virtuosity, and hailed as a brilliant executant himself, he maintained nevertheless the most rigorous standards of musicianship in his playing, in his compositions, and in the music which he appeared before the public to interpret. This is the more remarkable when one considers that his manhood was reached during the luxuriant period of French romanticism and that the extravagances of the literary outburst were reflected in the musical movements of the time. Virtuosity was subjected to sore temptations and many succumbed. Bertini stood for the sounder qualities of the artist and gradually acquired an extended and remunerative prestige. His life was singularly devoid of incident and official distinction, but the legacy of pedagogic works which he has left to us and his honorable activity give it every right to be called a success.

Bertini was celebrated as a teacher. His students included Eugenie Santa Coloma Sourget. Antoine Marmontel, who devoted the second chapter of his work on celebrated pianists to Bertini, wrote

He was unsurpassed as a teacher, giving his lessons with scrupulous care and the keenest interest in his pupils' progress. After he had given up teaching, a number of his pupils continued with me, and I recognized the soundness of the principles drawn from his instruction.

It is above all in the special class of studies and caprices, that Bertini's immense popularity is founded. It is here that he occupied a unique position and opened the path over which the next generation of composers was to rush after him. In each of his numerous collections of studies, embracing every degree of difficulty, he has insistently given to every piece, easy or difficult, brief or extended, a character of salient melody. The technical problem to be overcome presents itself as a song; even where the study is devoted to the problem of velocity the general contour falls into a melodic curve, and this is the first and transcendent cause of the universal success of these pieces, which are, furthermore, natural in respect to rhythm and carefully thought out harmonically.

Robert Schumann, in a review of one of Bertini's piano trios in the Gesammelte Schriften, comments that Bertini writes easily flowing harmony but that the movements are too long. He continues: "With the best will in the world, we find it difficult to be angry with Bertini, yet he drives us to distraction with his perfumed Parisian phrases; all his music is as smooth as silk and satin."

Bertini is best remembered today for his piano method Le Rudiment du pianiste, and his approximately 500 studies published in 20 books.

== Compositions ==
=== Nonetto Op. 107 ===
The Nonetto opus 107 for flute, oboe, bassoon, French horn, trumpet, viola, cello, double bass, and piano, composed in 1835, is one of Bertini's major works. Berlioz wrote a review in Maurice Schlesinger's widely distributed and very influential La Revue et Gazette musicale de Paris of a performance at a music evening given by the Tilmant brothers on 6 May 1838:

That same evening a Nonetto by Bertini for piano, viola, cello, oboe, flute, horn, bassoon, trumpet and bass, was performed. It is a great and beautiful composition in which each instrument contributes to the whole according to its importance and idiomatic qualities, without trying to stand out individually. The piano itself is only entrusted those parts which contribute to the musical sense of the moment, and makes no effort toward brilliance for brilliance's sake. Beethoven himself followed this philosophy in his immortal trios. Amongst other movements, this Nonetto includes an adagio entitled La Melancolie which provides more than its title might indicate; it is so grandiose, at times so majestically sombre, that the sentiment of melancholy one expects is overshadowed by ideas of a much higher and rare order. In no way do I mean to quibble with the title, God forbid; all I wish to say is that this admirable work is not only melancholic, but also much more. In the Scherzo and Finale one finds details of graceful melancholy as well as vivacious charm, but the Adagio rises up in the centre of the work like the Mont Blanc among its neighbouring peaks; it dominates all; it is a sublime and profound meditation which provides an almost painful impression that cannot be forgotten.

Berlioz later made further comments about this evening in the July 6 edition of Le Journal des débats:

The Nonetto by Bertini... is the work of a great musician with a lively and ardent imagination, who will grow stronger and more powerful if he refrains from his attempts to encourage applause as he occasionally sought to do in the first movement. His peroration was all too obvious and he is seen to be too preoccupied with achieving success and producing effects. This detracts from the free flowing of his thoughts. This fault does not exist in the other parts of the Nonetto. In composing these the author, fully involved in his subject, undoubtedly forgot that he was actually writing for his public, and concerned himself only with the task at hand and the ultimate unity of the work. Which of these last three movements is our favourite? The Adagio, above all, is without question a noble and magnificent inspiration whose sombre poetry reminds us of the sublime greatness of Beethoven's Sonatas. This is admirable.

The Nonetto was reduced to a quintet (flute or violin, violin, viola, cello and piano) by Charles Schwencke, a pianist and composer from Hamburg who was living in Paris. This appears to have been done for amateur musicians: the flute part, which can be replaced by a violin, contains frequent octave transpositions to make it easier to play.

=== Etudes ===
Bertini wrote approximately 500 études, ranging from easy studies for young students whose hands cannot span an octave to concert études. They were published in sets of 25 studies each. Roughly in order of difficulty they are:

- Études faciles composées expressément pour les petites mains
  - 25 Etudes faciles et progressives, Op.100
  - 25 Etudes, Op.137
  - 25 Études primaires, Op.166
- Introduction à celles de Cramer
  - 24 Etudes, Op.29
  - 24 Etudes, Op.32
- Études mélodiques
  - opus 86 sur les romances de A. Romagnési
  - opus 141 précédées chacune d'un prélude en deux suites. No. 1
  - opus 142 précédées chacune d'un prélude en deux suites. No. 2
- Introduction aux Études caractéristiques de l'opus 66
  - opus 134
- Études caractéristiques
  - opus 66
- Études caprices ou Complément aux Études caractéristiques
  - opus 94
- Grandes Études artistiques de première force
  - opus 122
- Bertini also wrote several sets of études for piano four hands
  - opus 160 L'Art de la mesure pour les petites mains à quatre mains
  - opus 149 Études très facile à quatre mains
  - opus 150 Études très facile à quatre mains
  - opus 97 Études musicales à quatre mains pour le piano
  - opus 135 Études musicales à quatre mains pour le piano
  - WoO Frère et soeur. Quatre petits Duos pour le piano à quatre mains composés pour Henri et Isabelle.
  - WoO Mère et fille. Quatre petits Duos pour le piano à quatre mains suite à Frère et soeur.
- In addition to these, the last five published books of études appear to have been conceived as a set
  - opus 175 Études préparatoires
  - opus 176 Études intermédiares
  - opus 177 Études spéciales de la vélocité, du trille et de la main gauche
  - opus 178 Études normales et classiques
  - opus 179 Études suite de l'opus 150 à quatre mains pour le piano

== Catalogue of works ==
=== Early works, without opus ===
- Introduction and variations upon the air of Gondrillon
- Celebrated Irish melody as sung in the opera of Guy Mannering with variations and an introduction for the piano forte
- Third divertimento for the piano forte
- Air with seven variations for the piano forte
- Polacca composed pour the piano forte
- Again a little trifle. Andante for the piano forte

=== With opus ===
op.11	Quatrième Divertissement pour le piano forte
op.12	Rondeau polonaise pour le piano forte
op.15	Rondo pastoral pour le piano
op.16	Fantaisie pour piano sur l'air Au clair de la lune
op.17	Fantaisie pour piano forte sur le trio des deux jaloux, Ta Fanchette est charmante
op.18	Air allemande, varié pour le piano forte et précédé d'une introduction
op.20	Trio pour piano, violon, et basse, n^{o} 1
op.21	Trio pour piano, violon, et basse, n^{o} 2
op.22	Trio pour piano, violon, et basse, n^{o} 3
op.23	Rondo brillant pour piano
op.24	Grand Quatuor pour piano forte, harpe, violon et violoncelle
op.25	Première Sérénade pour piano, violon, alto, et violoncelle
op.26	Rondo brillant pour piano
op.27	Variations pour le forte-piano sur la Romance : Si tu voulais
op.28	Air allemand avec introduction varié pour la harpe
op.29	Vingt-cinq Etudes pour piano, 1^{er} livre. Introduction à celles de Cramer
op.30	Deux Caprices pour le piano-forte
op.31	Deuxième Sérénade pour piano, violon, alto et violoncelle
op.32	Vingt-cinq Etudes pour piano, 2^{ème} livre. Introduction à celles de Cramer
op.33	Nocturne concertant pour piano, violon et violoncelle
op.34	Trois Bagatelles pour piano forte
op.35	Duo sur Au clair de la lune, pour harpe et piano
op.36	Divertissement sur un air de Gluck, pour piano
op.37	Rondeau brillant pour piano forte
op.38	Variations brillantes pour le piano
op.39	Troisième Sérénade pour piano, violon, violoncelle
op.40	Variations brillantes pour le piano
op.41	Polonaise sur le Freyschütz pour piano et violoncelle
op.42	L'Angélus de A.Romagnési. Variations brillantes pour le piano forte
op.43	Grand Trio pour piano, violon, violoncelle. download scan of Richault edition (From the Sibley Music Library Digital Score Collection)
op.44	Variations brillantes pour pianosur le choeur favori de Robin des bois, musique de Weber
op.45	Souvenirs de Freyschütz (Robin des bois). Variations et Rondo pour piano sur la jolie cavatine L'Infortune, les alarmes et autres motifs
op.46	Grande Fantasie. Etude de 1^{ère} force. download music from WIMA
op.47	Rondo brillant pour piano composé sur le quatuor de Joconde, Quand on attend so belle
op.48	Grand Trio pour piano, violon et violoncelle
―	Sérénade pour piano, violon, alto et basse
op.50	Rondo brillant pour piano forte sur l'air : A l'eau, voilà la porteuse d'eau
op.51	Rondoletto brillant pour piano
op.52	Thème avec variations brillantes pour le piano forte
―	Douze petits morceaux pour le piano précédés chaqun d'un prélude composés expressément pour les élèves
op.54	Rondo brillant pour le piano
op.56	Variations brillantes sur Il crociato Egitto
op.57	Variations brillantes pour piano sur une valse autichienne
op.59	Trois Valses à quatre mains
op.60	Deux petits Rondos pour le piano forte
op.61	Variations brillantes pour le piano forte
op.62	Le Calme. Andante pour piano forte
op.63	Rondoletto pour piano
op.64	Deux thèmes pour le piano
op.65	Divertissement pour piano
op.66	Vingt-cinq Etudes caractéristiques
op.68	Variations sur un thème original pour piano
op.69	Variations de concert pour piano et quatuor. download music from WIMA
op.70	Trio pour piano, violon, violoncelle
op.71	N^{o} 1. Rondoletto pour piano. N^{o} 2. Polacca pour piano.
op.72	Divertissement pour piano
op.73	Variations sur un thème original à quatre mains
op.74	Six Valses brillantes pour piano
op.75	Quatrième Sérénade pour piano, violon, alto, violoncelle contrebasse
op.76	Cinquième Sérénade pour piano, violon, alto, violoncelle contrebasse
op.77	Rondino à quatre mains
op.78	Variations brillantes pour piano sur un thème original
op.79	Première grand Sextuor pour piano forte, deux violons, alto, violoncelle et contrebasse
op.80	Six Valses brillantes pour piano
op.81	Trois petits Rondos pour piano
op.82	La soirée, à quatre mains
op.83	Six Divertissements à quatre mains
op.84	Le Rudiment du Pianiste ou réunion des exercises les plus indispensables pour acquérir un mécanisme parfat
op.85	Second grand Sextuor pour piano forte, deux violons, alto, violoncelle et contrebasse
op.86	Etudes mélodiques sur des romances de A.Romagnési
op.87	Trois nocturnes pour piano download music from WIMA
op.88	Ma Normandie. Romance favorite de Mr F.Bérat variée pour le piano download music from WIMA
op.89	Rondino alla polacca pour le piano
op.90	Troisième grand Sextuor pour piano, deux violons, alto, violoncelle et contrebasse
op.91	Rondino, sur un motif de L'Orgie, pour piano
op.92	Souvenirs du Barbier. Duo concertant pour piano et violon et basse ad libitum
op.93	Grande Polonaise ave orchestre ad libitium download music from WIMA
op.94	Vingt-cinq Etudes caprice ou Complément aux Etudes caractéristiques
op.95	Souvenirs d'Anna Bolena. Duo concertant pour piano et violon avec accompagnement de basse ad libitum
op.96	Caprice sur Le Pirate pour piano, violon et contrebasse ad libitum
op.97	Vingt-cinq Etudes musicales à quatre mains pour le piano. Le but de cet ouvrage est de faire aux élèves un exercise spécial de la mesure, du rythme et de la phrase musicale
op.98	Episode d'un bal. Rondo caractéristique pour piano
op.99	N^{o} 1. Rondeau Galop sur La Sentinelle perdue. N^{o} 2. Rondeau Valse sur La Sentinelle perdue.
op.100	Vingt-cinq Etudes facile composées expressément pour les petites mains qui ne peuvent encore embrasser l'étendue de l'octave
op.101	Le Repos. Vingt-quatre leçons mélodiques
op.102	Deux Nocturnes download music from WIMA
op.103	Adieu beau rivage de France. Rondo barcarolle pour le piano
op.104	Jura. Impressions de voyage, les souvenirs pour piano
op.105	Grand Rondo de concert avec orchestre download music from WIMA
op.106	Dell' aura tua profetica, choeur de Norma varié pour le piano download music from WIMA
op.107	Nonetto en ré pour piano, flûte, hautbois, alto, violoncelle, cor, basson, trompette et contrebasse
op.108	Caprice sur la romance de Grisar, Les laveuses du couvent, pour le piano
op.109	Solo composé pour le concours de 1836. Ecole royale de musique, classe de piano de L.Adam download music from WIMA
op.110	Caprice pour piano sur l'opera Sarah
op.111	Son mom. Rondo caprice pour piano sur la romance favouite de Melle Loïsa Puget
op.112	Fantaisie sur Le Caevalier de Canolle
op.113	Ernestine. Grande Fantaisie sur un thème de Paddini intercalée par Rubini dans La Straniera download music from WIMA
op.114	Quatrième grand Sextuor pour piano, violon, deux altos, violoncelle et contrebasse
op.115	Caprice pour piano sur Le Postillon de Lonjumeau
op.116	Fantaisie sur Le Postillon de Lonjumeau
op.117	Caprice pour le piano sur des motifs de L'Ambassedrice d'Auber
op.118	Grande Fantaisie dramatique pour le piano download music from WIMA
op.119	Duex Nocturnes pour le piano. N^{o} 1. Sympathie N^{o} 2. Souvenir
op.120	Grande Fantaisie à quatre mains pour le piano sur les motifs de l'opéra Le domino noir d'Auber
op.121	Deuxième Solo composé pour le piano pour le concours de 1838. Ecole royale de musique, classe de piano de L.Adam download music from WIMA
op.122	Vingt-cinq Grandes Etudes artistiques de première force d'exécution en deux suites
op.123	La mère du chasseur. Rondino expresso pour piano sur la romance de P.Chéret
op.124	Cinquième Sextuor pour piano, violon, deux altos, violoncelle et contrebasse
op.125	Duo brillant à quatre mains sur Le Lac des fées d'Auber
op.126	Fantaisie à quatre mains pour piano sur deux motifs de l'opéra Robert Devereux de Donizetti
op.127	Frande fantaisie pour le piano sur l'opéra L'Elisire d'Amour
op.128	Duo brillant à quatre mains sur l'opéra La fille du régiment de Donizetti
op.129	Duo brillant à quatre mains sur l'opéra Les Martyrs de Donizetti
op.130	Deux Nocturnes N^{o} 1. Contenpiazone N^{o} 2. Inquieto
op.131	Grand Caprice pour piano à quatre mains sur un motif de La Straniera de Bellini
op.132	Souvenirs de Zanetta, l'opéra d'Auber. Grand Duo
―	Petit quatuor à cordes
op.133	Première symphonie pour orchestre
op.134	Vingt-cinq Etudes pour le piano. Introduction aux Etudes caractéristiques de l'opus 66
op.135	Vingt-cinq Etudes musicales pour piano à quatre mains
op.136	Grande fantaisie à quatre mains sur Les Diamants de la couronne
op.137	Vingt-cinq Etudes élémentaires pour les petites mains
op.138	Deuxième symphonie pour orchestre
op.139	Duo à quatre mains pour le piano sur thèmes du Duc d'Olonne, opéra d'Auber
op.140	Grand Duo pour piano à quatre mains sur les motifs du Stabat de G.Rossini
op.141	Cinquante Etudes mélodiques précédées chacune d'un prélude en deux suites. N^{o} 1.
op.142	Cinquante Etudes mélodiques précédées chacune d'un prélude en deux suites. N^{o} 2.
op.143	Le double dièze. Rondino-Etude
op.144	Le double bémol. Rondino-Etude
op.145	L'impromptu. Rondo-Valse
op.146	Sérénade. Caprice sur un motif de Don Pasquale de Donizetti
op.147	Etude et andante pour piano
op.148	Grand Duo sur La Part du Diable
op.149	Vingt-cinq Etudes très faciles à quatre mains
op.150	Vingt-cinq Etudes faciles à quatre mains
op.151	Fantaisie brillante pour piano sur des motifs favoris de Maria di Rohan de Donizetti
op.152	Première Sonate pour piano et violon
op.153	Deuxième Sonate pour piano et violon
op.154	Fantaisie valse, Elvina
op.155	Grand Divertissement brillant pour le piano à quatre mains
op.156	Troisième Sonate pour piano et violon
op.157	Deux melodies de Fr. Schubert, arrangées pour le piano à quatre mains
op.158	Les deux soeurs : Deux Romances sans paroles N^{o}1. Louise N^{o}2. Isabelle
op.159	Grand Duo à quatre mains sur les thèmes de Moïse, opéra de G.Rossini
op.160	L'Art de la mesure, 25 Etudes primaires pour les petites mains, à quatre mains et en partition pour les commençants,
op.161	Morceaux de salon. Grande Marche brillante pour le piano
op.162	Cantilena pour piano
op.163	Lou Pastour. Souvenir de Sainte Beaume. Fantaisie pour le piano
op.164	Souvenirs sur la Durance. Caprice pour piano
op.165	Grand Duo pour le piano à quatre mains sur La cloche des agonisants et La poste, mélodies de F.Schubert
op.166	Vingt-cinq Etudes primaires pour les petites mains
―	Frère et Soeur. Quatre petits Duos à quatre mains composés pour Henri et Isabelle
―	Mère et fille. Quatre petits Duos à quatre mains faisant suite à Frère et Soeur
op.167	Trois Solos pour piano de concours à l'usage des pensionnats de jeunes demoiselles
op.168	Fantaisie pour le piano à quatre mains sur I Puratini de Bellini
op.169	Duo pour le piano à quatre mains sur Norma de Bellini
op.170	Fantaisia pour le piano à quatre mains sur La Somnambula de Bellini
op.171	Trois petits Solos pour piano. Morceaux de concours à l'usage des pensionnats de jeunes demoiselles
op.172	Sixième Sextuor pour piano, deux violons, alto, violoncelle et contrebasse
op.173	Banockburn. Fantaisie pour le piano à quatre mains sur des motifs de Robert Bruce, opéra de Rossini
op.175	Vingt-cinq Etudes préparatoires
op.176	Vingt-cinq Etudes intermédiaires
op.177	Vingt-cinq Etudes spéciales de la vélocité, de trille et de la main gauche
op.178	Vingt-cinq Etudes normales et classiques
op.179	Vingt-cinq Etudes suite de l'opus 150
op.180	Esquisses musicales. Vingt-quatre morceaux caractéristics

=== Music published without opus ===
Vocal Music

Le jaloux dupé. Opéra comique en 1 acte

N^{o} 1.	L'Ame. Mélodie
N^{o} 2.	L'Orage. Mélodie
N^{o} 3.	Ballade
N^{o} 4.	Paysage. Elégie
N^{o} 5.	Marie. Mélodie

- Caïn. Scène biblique (Biblical scene)
- Françoise de Rimini
- Cinq Morceaux religieux. Paroles latines à usage des séminaires, communautés religieuses, chapelles et maisons d'education. Ave Maris Stella, O Salutaris, Tantum Ergo, Ave Maris Stella, Ave Maria (Five religious pieces. Latin lyrics for the use of seminarians, religious communities, chapels, and places of education...)
- Deuxième Messe à quatre voix pour deux ténors et deux basses avec accompagnement d'orgue (Second Mass in four voices for two tenors and two basses with organ accompaniment.)
- La Melodie Religieuse. Collection de motets au Saint Sacrement et à la Sainte Vierge à une ou plusieurs voix avec accompagnement d'orgue (Religious melody. Collection of motets to the Holy Sacrament and the Holy Virgin for one or several voices with organ accompaniment.)

Studies

- La Gymnastique des doigts. Préparation à l'étude du piano (Finger gymnastic. preparation for piano studies)
- La Semaine du Pianiste. Etudes journalières de la gamme dans tous les tons majeurs et mineurs (The pianist's week. Daily studies of all the major and minor scales.)
- Etudes pour le piano forte en 24 exercices (Studies for panoforte in 24 exercises).
- Exercices en doubles notes (Exercises for double notes).
- Exercices en octaves, exercices en accord (Exercises for octaves and chords).
- Premières leçons doigtées et arrangées pour les petites mains (First lessons in fingering and arranged for small hands).
- Cinquantes Leçons progressives, faisant suite aux précédentes (Fifty progressive lessons, following the preceding ones)
- Douze Etudes spéciales (Twelve special studies)

Miscellaneous piano pieces

- La Romanesca
- Scherzo en do majeur pour piano
- Storielle amorosa pour piano

=== Collaborations with other musicians ===
Duos for piano and violin by Bertini and Antoine Fontaine

- 1^{er} livre. L'Amitié, grand Duo pour piano et violon
- 2^{ème} livre. Les saisons, Duo brillant pour piano, violon ou violoncelle
- 3^{ème} livre. Fantaisie et variations brillantes sur un air suisse pour piano et violon concertantes
- 4^{ème} livre. Fantaisie concertante sur Robin des Bois pour piano et violon
- 5^{ème} livre. L'automne. Grand duo concertant pour piano et violon
- 6^{ème} livre. La Conversation. Duo concertant pour piano et violon
- 7^{ème} livre. Duetto pour piano et violon
- 8^{ème} livre. Serenata pour piano et violon
- 9^{ème} livre. Notturno pour piano et violon

Duo for piano and violin by Bertini and Auguste Franchomme

- Thème varié pour piano et violoncelle

Duo for piano and flute by Bertini and Joseph Guillou

- Fantaisie pour piano et flûte

=== Arrangements ===
- Collection des préludes et fugues de Sébastien Bach arrangés pour le piano à quatre mains. Ecole de la musique d' ensemble. Etudes spéciales du style élévé, de la mesure et de toutes les combinaisons les plus difficiles du rythme. (Collection of preludes and fugues by Sebastian Bach arranged for piano with four hands. School of ensemble music. Special studies of elevated style, of measures (bars) and of all the most difficult combinations of rhythm.)

=== Methods ===
- Méthode pratique pour le piano forte rédigée d'après le mode d'enseignement indiqué par J. Jacotet et composée de morceaux choisis (Practical method for the pianoforte edited according to the teaching method described by J. Jacotet and composed of chosen pieces.)
- Méthode élémentaire et facile de piano (Simple, elementary method for the piano).
- Méthode complète et progressive de piano (Complete and progressive method for the piano).

=== Works fingered by Bertini ===
- Muzio Clémenti, Etudes journières des gammes. (Muzio Clémenti, Daily studies of scales.)

== Notes ==
=== References ===
- Beyls, Pascal (1999). "Henri Bertini, pianiste virtuose, compositeur de musique" (in French). Grenoble.
- Cobbett, Walter Willson. Cobbett's Cyclopedic Survey of Chamber Music. Vol. 1 (2nd ed.).
- Fétis, François-Joseph (1868). Biographie universelle des musiciens. Vol. 1er (2ème ed.). Paris: Librairie de Firmin-Didot et Cie. pp. 385–386, supplement pp. 81–82.
- Marmontel, Antoine François (1878). Les Pianistes célèbres: Silhouettes et Médaillons. Paris: A. Chaix et Cie. pp. 14–23.
- Tapper, Thomas (1905). Henri Bertini, Twenty-Five Easy Studies Op. 100. Boston: Oliver Ditson.
