= François-Frédéric Lemot =

French sculptor (1772–1827)

- Portrait of Lemot by Jean-François Armbruster, 1885
- Born: 4 November 1772; Lyon, France
- Died: 6 May 1827 (aged 54); Paris, France
- Occupation: Sculptor

François-Frédéric Lemot (English: /ləˈmoʊ/ lə-MOH, French: [fʁɑ̃swa fʁedeʁik ləmo]; 4 November 1772 – 6 May 1827) was a French sculptor, working in the Neoclassical style.

== Biography ==
Lemot was born at Lyon. Having briefly studied architecture at the Academy of Besançon, then having made his way to Paris on foot, the adolescent Lemot was discovered sketching a sculpture of Pierre Pujet in the park of Sceaux and taken into the atelier of Claude Dejoux, a minor Neoclassical sculptor who had trained with Guillaume Coustou the Younger.

At the age of seventeen he won the Prix de Rome for sculpture in 1790, with a bas-relief of The Judgement of Solomon, and became a pensionnaire at the French Academy in Rome, where his stay was interrupted in 1793 by a call to the Army of the Rhine.

Two years later he was recalled to participate in a competition under a committee of the National Convention for a colossal bronze sculpture of The French People in the guise of Hercules; his model was judged to be the best, however the monument was never commissioned. His first showing at the Paris Salon was in 1801.

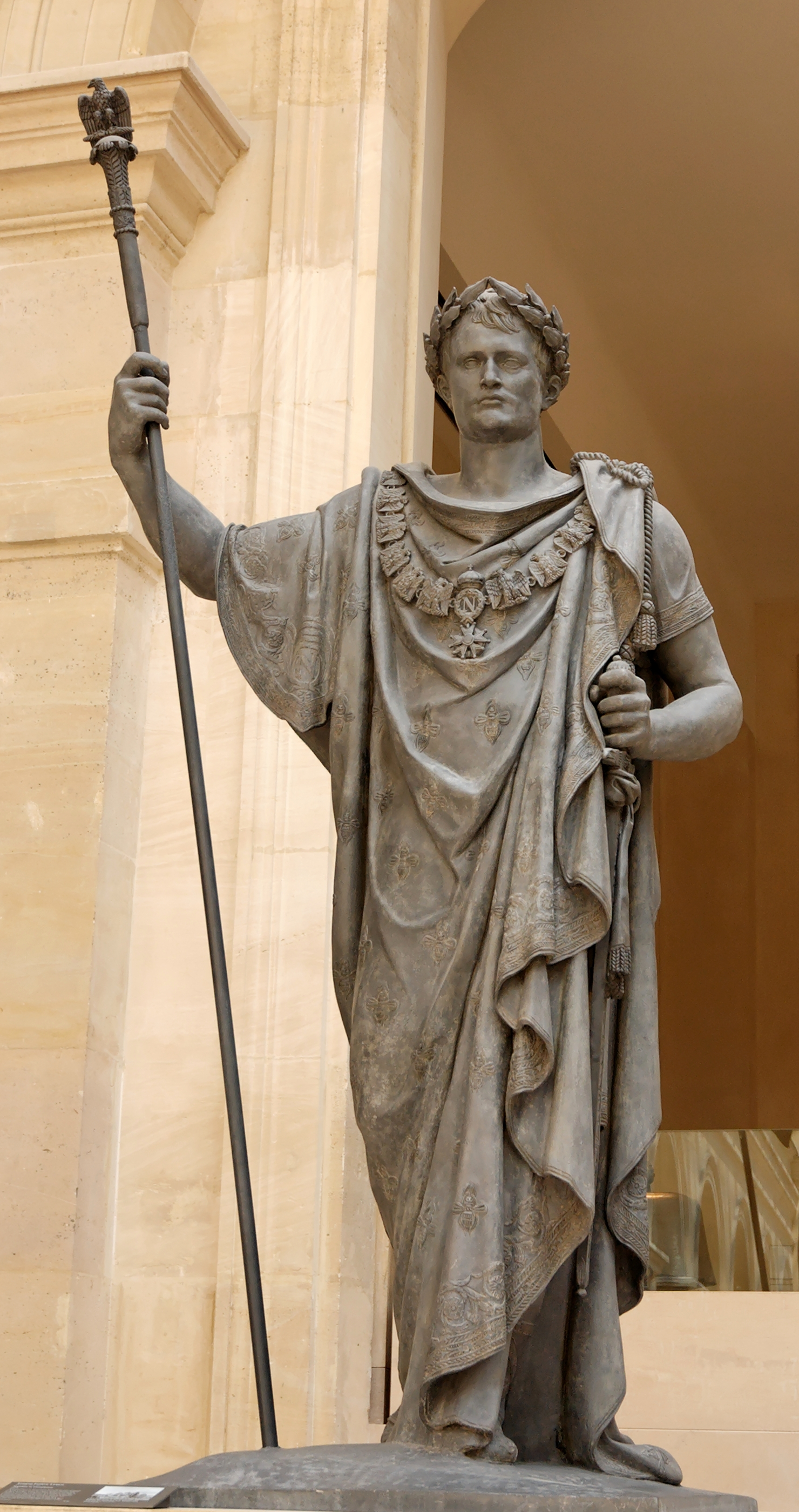
Napoleon in Triumph, 1808.

Under the Empire he was commissioned to sculpt the chariot and figure of Fame in the quadriga atop the Arc de Triomphe du Carrousel that stood in front of the Tuileries Palace, for which the horses were the Greek bronze horses removed by Napoleon from St. Mark's, Venice.

He was elected to the Académie des Beaux-Arts de l'Institut de France in 1805, then named a member of the Institut de France, 1805, then to the Legion of Honor and presented with the Ordre de Saint-Michel and the title of Baron of the Empire.

With the Bourbon Restoration, Lemot was entrusted with the recasting of the equestrian monument to Henri IV that had been destroyed during the Revolution. Two sculptures of Napoleon, melted down for the occasion, provided the bronze, and the cast was taken from a mold of a surviving cast of the original.

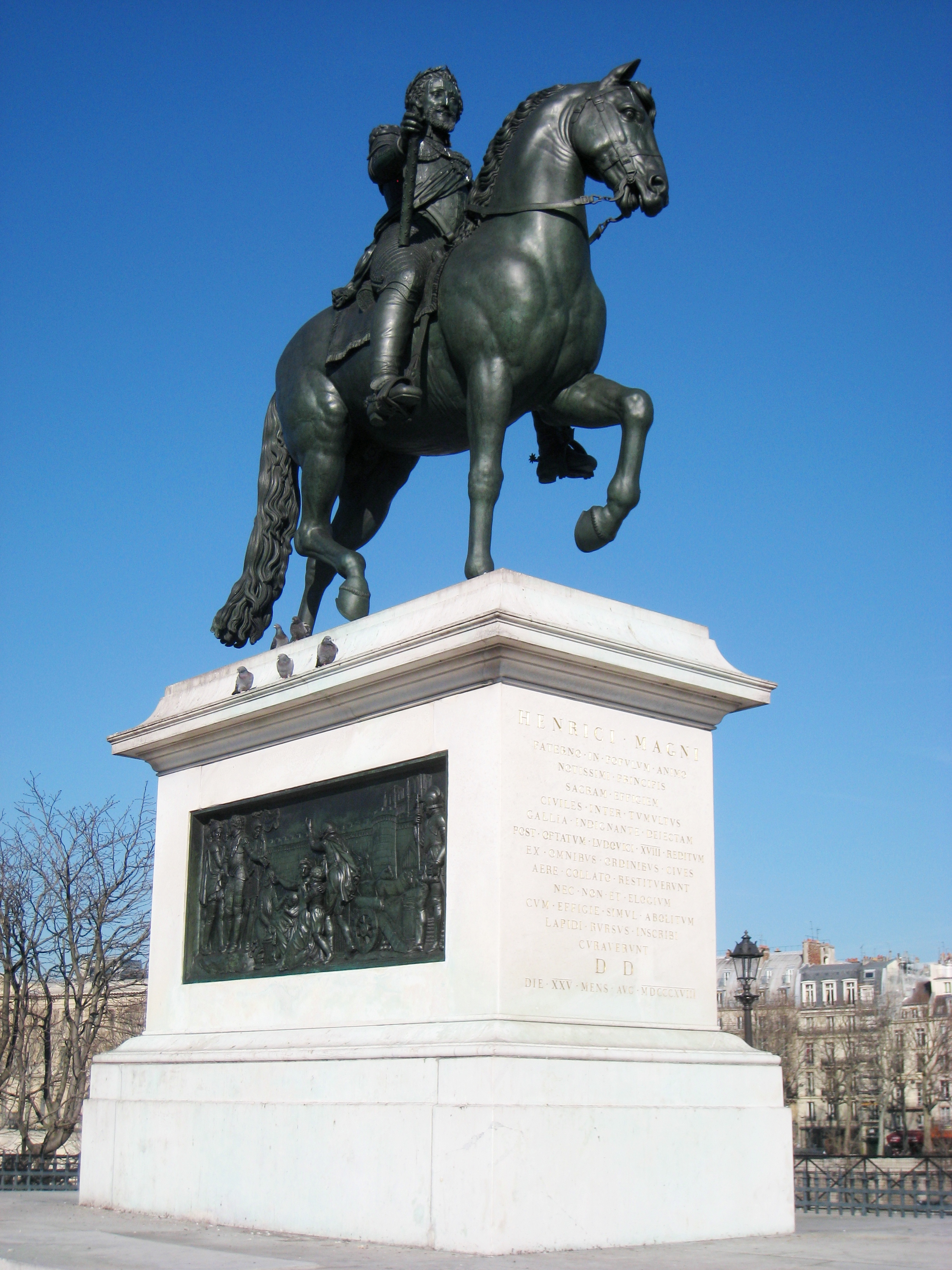
The equestrian statue of Henri IV on the Pont Neuf.

Lemot also provided the bronze bas-relief panels for its pedestal; the sculpture (illustration) was unveiled 25 August 1818. Lemot also created an Equestrian Monument of Louis XIV that provides the focal point of Place Bellecour, Lyon, where a street bears his name. At 18 meters, it was the largest bronze casting of its time.

With the considerable fortune he had earned, Lemot bought the Château de Clisson in western France, in the département of Loire-Atlantique (Pays de la Loire), and the town, which had been destroyed during the Revolt in the Vendée, was rebuilt according to his plans. He published a Notice historique sur la ville et le château de Clisson, or Voyage pittoresque dans le Bocage de la Vendée, 1817.

His pupil, Louis Dupaty, obtained a Premier Grand Prix in sculpture, 1799, with his Pericles visiting Anaxagoras. On his return from the French Academy in Rome he was named to the Institut de France, in 1816, then appointed a professor at the École des Beaux-Arts. The most famous sculptor to emerge from Lemot's studio was Lorenzo Bartolini. Lemot died at Paris in 1827.

== Selected works ==
- Numa Pompilius Lycurgus and Brutus for the Chambre de Conseil des Cinq Cent, Assemblée Nationale.
- Léonidas for the Chambre des Pairs.
- Figures for the triumphal arch at Châlons-sur-Marne, destroyed by the Allies in 1814.
- Cicero addressing Catiline, over lifesize.
- Sleeping Woman, statue.
- Napoleon in Triumph (1808), lead, (Musée du Louvre). This standing figure stood briefly in the quadriga of the Arc du Carrousel.
- Equestrian Henri IV (1817), bronze. The sculpture on the Pont Neuf, Paris, reproduces the work designed by Giambologna and completed by Pietro Tacca, 1618.
- Louis XIV, bronze, Lyon, Place Bellecour.
- Allegorical bas-relief, the bust of Liberty between seated figures of History and Fame, in white marble against a porphyry ground, for the Chambre des Deputés.
