= Charles-René Laitié =

French sculptor (1782–1862)

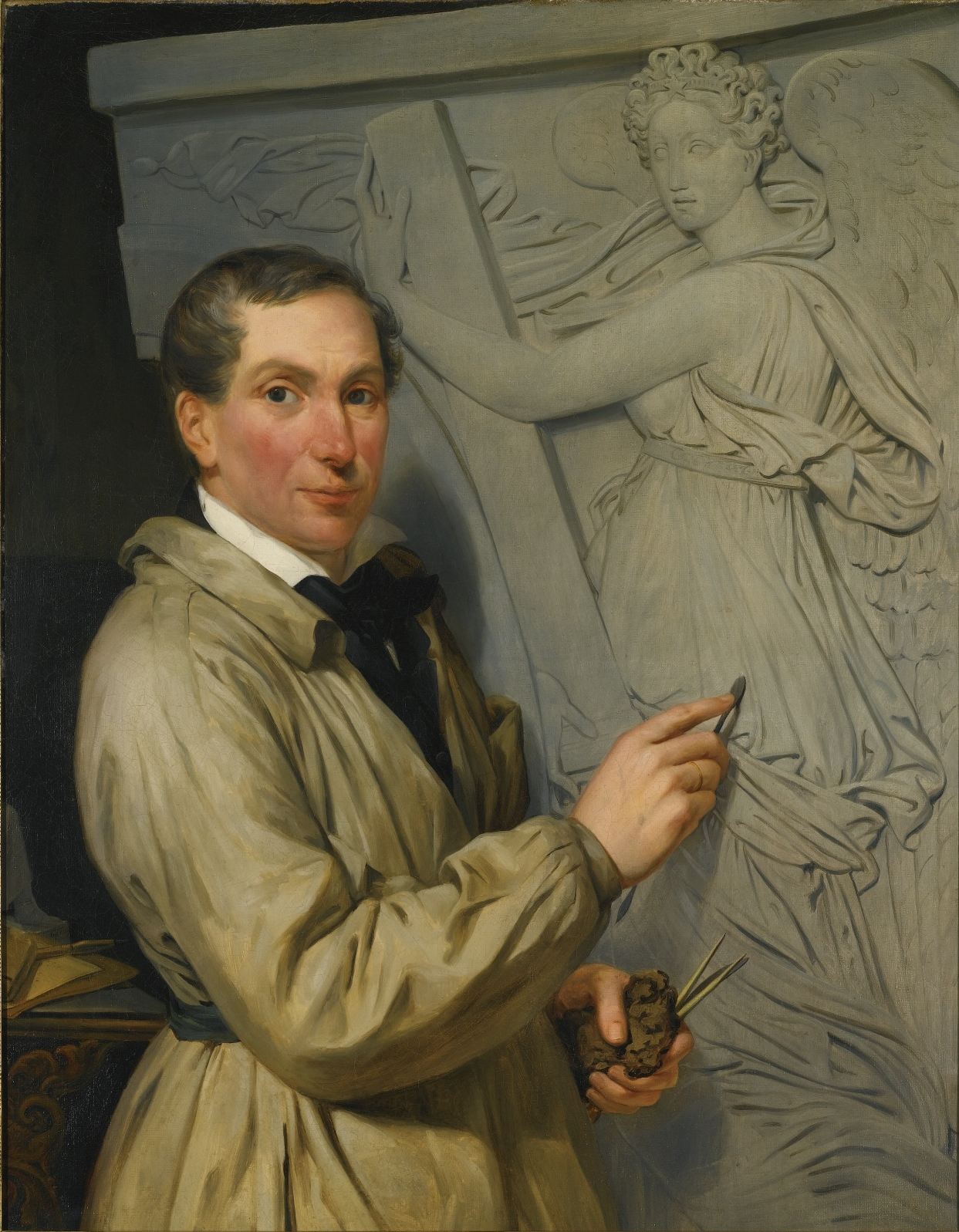
- Portrait of Charles-René Laitié sculpting la Force c. 1824
- Born: 1782; Paris, France
- Died: 11 December 1862 (aged 79–80); Paris, France
- Occupation: Sculptor

Charles-René Laitié (1782 – 11 December 1862) was a French sculptor.

== Early years ==
Charles-René Laitié was born in Paris in 1782. He became a pupil of Claude Dejoux (1732–1816). He also studied under Pierre Cartellier. He won a medal from the Royal School in the year XII, and the Grand Prix de Rome in 1804. The prize was awarded for his Méléagre refusant son secours aux habitans de Calydon. While in Rome in 1806 Laitié made a plaster model of Homer. In 1827 he presented a small bronze at the Salon from this model, with the date 1806.

== Bourbon Restoration ==
In 1820 Laitié was commissioned by the state to make a statue of Jean de La Fontaine, the poet. It was exhibited in the Salon of 1822 and installed in Château-Thierry on 6 November 1824. He won a gold medal at the Salon of 1824. The sculptor Claude André Deseine had made a large sculpture of General Colbert during the First French Empire. Under Louis Philippe Laitié transformed it into a statue of Marshal Mortier, which was placed in the first court of the palace of Versailles. In 1963 it was moved to Le Plessis-Trévise, the marshal's home town.

In 1830 Laitié made the central figure of Charity for the portico of Notre-Dame-de-Lorette, Paris. It is flanked by Faith by Denis Foyatier and Hope by Philippe Henri Lemaire.

== Works ==
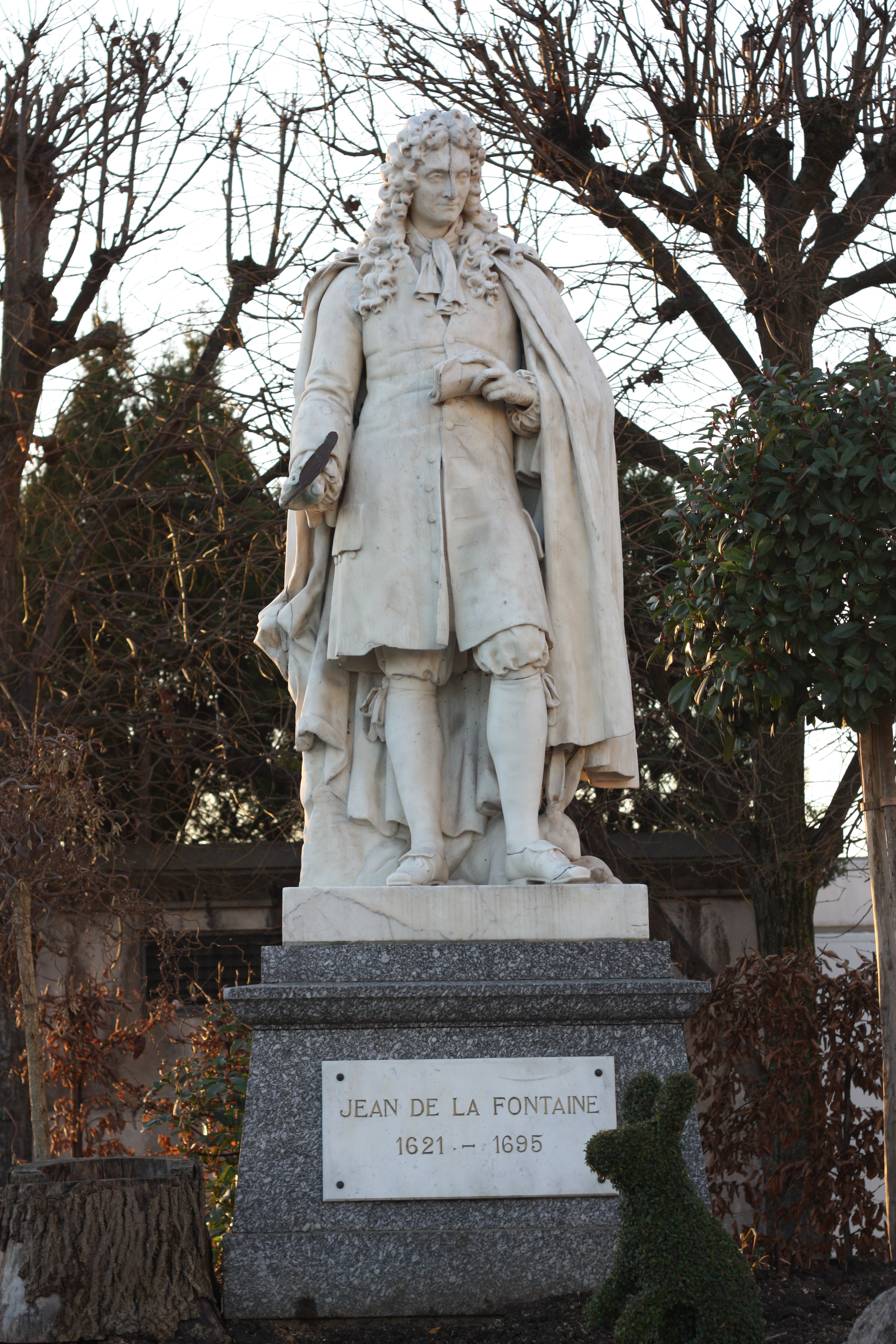
Jean de La Fontaine at Château-Thierry

Laitié's works include:

- 1812 Bust of Man (marble)
- 1814 Bust of the king
- 1817 Astronomer, bas-relief intended for the fountain of the Bastille.
- 1819 St. John the Baptist
- 1822 marble bust of Nicolas-Pierre Tiolier, engraver-general of currencies
- 1822 Statue of Jean de La Fontaine, marble, 6 ft high, for the town of Château-Thierry
- 1822 St. Luke, stone statue, 12 ft high for Arras Cathedral
- 1824 Charity plaster group for the church of Saint-Étienne-du-Mont
- 1824 Stone bas-relief stone for the center of the courtyard of the Louvre, representing Justice and Strength
- 1824 Bust of Mme Tiolier
- 1827 Homer plaster statue 5 ft 9 inches.
- Relief for the ceiling of the staircase of the Paris Bourse, representing Themis and Mercury
- 1825 Marble bas relief, representing Painting placed in the grand staircase of the Museum, 6 ft, included in the exhibition of 1827

== Sources ==
- Comte de Clarac (1847). Manuel de l'histoire de l'art chez les anciens [ed. by V.Texier].
- Gabet, Charles (1831). "LAITIE (Charles-Rene)". Dictionnaire des artistes de l'école française au XIXe siècle: Peinture, sculpture, architecture, gravure, dessin, lithographie et composition musicale. Madame Vergne.
- "La Justice et la Force. Charles René Laitié. 1824". Le décor extérieur du Louvre.
- Lapaire, Clause (2011-04-25). "La genèse d'une sculpture de James Pradier : Homère et son guide". Forum Pradier.
- "Présentation de l'Église". Notre-Dame-de-Lorette. Archived from the original on 2014-08-26.
