= Jean de La Fontaine =

French fabulist and poet (1621–1695)

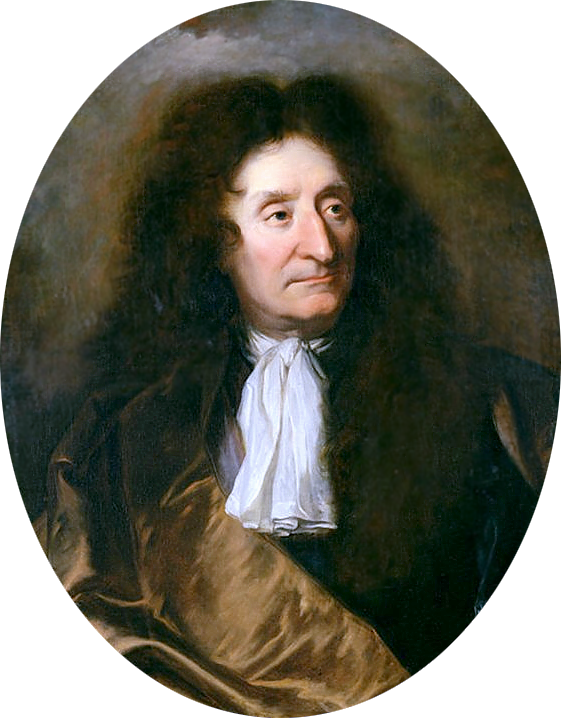
- Portrait by Hyacinthe Rigaud (Carnavalet Museum)
- Born: 8 July 1621; Château-Thierry, Champagne, France
- Died: 13 April 1695 (aged 73); Neuilly-sur-Seine, Île-de-France, France
- Resting place: Père Lachaise Cemetery
- Occupations: Fabulist, poet, author
- Children: 1
- Parent(s): Charles de La Fontaine (father), Françoise Pidoux (mother)
- Writing career
- Notable works: Contes et nouvelles en vers (1665, 1666); Fables (1668–1694)

Signature
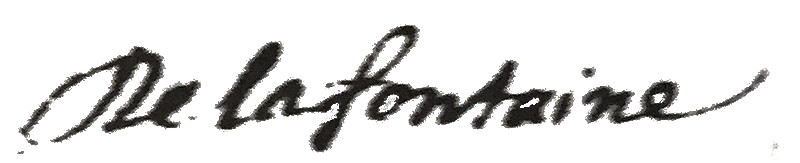

Jean de La Fontaine (UK: /ˌlæ fɒnˈtɛn, -ˈteɪn/, US: /ˌlɑː fɒnˈteɪn, lə -, ˌlɑː foʊnˈtɛn/; French: [ʒɑ̃ d(ə) la fɔ̃tɛn]; 8 July 1621 – 13 April 1695) was a French fabulist and one of the most widely read French poets of the 17th century. He is known above all for his Fables, which provided a model for subsequent fabulists across Europe and numerous alternative versions in France, as well as in French regional languages.

After a long period of royal suspicion, he was admitted to the Académie Française and his reputation in France has never faded since. Evidence of this is found in the many pictures and statues of the writer, later depictions on medals, coins and postage stamps.

== Life ==
=== Early years ===
La Fontaine was born at Château-Thierry close to the present-day northeastern edge of Île-de-France (Greater Paris) in France. His father was Charles de La Fontaine, maître des eaux et forêts (a kind of deputy-ranger) of the Duchy of Château-Thierry.

Both his father and his mother, Françoise (née Pidoux) were of families of the highest provincial middle class; though they were not noble, his father was fairly wealthy.

Jean, the eldest child, was educated at the collège (grammar school) of Château-Thierry, and at the end of his school days he entered the Oratory in May 1641, and the seminary of Saint-Magloire in October of the same year; but a very short sojourn proved to him that he had mistaken his vocation. He then apparently studied law, and is said to have been admitted as avocat (lawyer).

=== Family life ===
He was, however, settled in life, or at least might have been so, somewhat early. In 1647 his father resigned his rangership in his favor, and arranged a marriage for him with Marie Héricart, a 14 year old, who brought him 20,000 livres, and expectations. She seems to have been both beautiful and intelligent, but the two did not get along well together. There appears to be absolutely no ground for the vague scandal as to her conduct, which was, for the most part, raised long afterwards by gossip or personal enemies of La Fontaine. All that can be positively said against her is that she was a negligent housewife and an inveterate novel reader; La Fontaine himself was constantly away from home, was certainly not strict in point of conjugal fidelity, and was so bad a man of business that his affairs became involved in hopeless difficulty, and a financial separation of property (separation de biens) had to take place in 1658. This was a perfectly amicable transaction for the benefit of the family; by degrees, however, the pair, still without any actual quarrel, ceased to live together, and for the greater part of the last forty years of de la Fontaine's life he lived in Paris while his wife remained in Château-Thierry which, however, he frequently visited. One son was born to them in 1653, and was educated and taken care of wholly by his mother.

=== Paris ===
Title page, vol. 2 of La Fontaine's Fables choisies, 1692 ed.

Even in the earlier years of his marriage, La Fontaine seems to have been much in Paris, but it was not until about 1656 that he became a regular visitor to the capital. The duties of his office, which were only occasional, were compatible with this non-residence. It was not until he was past thirty that his literary career began. The reading of Malherbe, it is said, first awoke poetical fancies in him, but for some time he attempted nothing but trifles in the fashion of the time – epigrams, ballades, rondeaux, etc.

His first serious work was a translation or adaptation of the Eunuchus of Terence (1654). At this time the patron of French writing was the Superintendent Fouquet, to whom La Fontaine was introduced by Jacques Jannart, a connection of his wife's. Few people who paid their court to Fouquet went away empty-handed, and La Fontaine soon received a pension of 1000 livres (1659), on the easy terms of a copy of verses for each quarters receipt. He also began a medley of prose and poetry, entitled Le Songe de Vaux, on Fouquet's famous country house.

It was about this time that his wife's property had to be separately secured to her, and he seems by degrees to have had to sell everything that he owned; but, as he never lacked powerful and generous patrons, this was of small importance to him. In the same year he wrote a ballad, Les Rieurs du Beau-Richard, and this was followed by many small pieces of occasional poetry addressed to various personages from the king downwards. Fouquet fell out of favour with the king and was arrested. La Fontaine, like most of Fouquet's literary protégés, showed some fidelity to him by writing the elegy Pleurez, Nymphes de Vaux.

Just at this time his affairs did not look promising. His father and he had assumed the title of esquire, to which they were not strictly entitled, and, some old edicts on the subject having been put in force, an informer procured a sentence against the poet fining him 2000 livres. He found, however, a new protector in the duke and still more in the Duchess of Bouillon, his feudal superiors at Château-Thierry, and nothing more is heard of the fine.

Some of La Fontaine's liveliest verses are addressed to the duchess Marie Anne Mancini, the youngest of Mazarin's nieces, and it is even probable that the taste of the duke and duchess for Ariosto had something to do with the writing of his first work of real importance, the first book of the Contes, which appeared in 1664. He was then forty-three years old, and his previous printed productions had been comparatively trivial, though much of his work was handed about in manuscript long before it was regularly published.

=== Fame ===
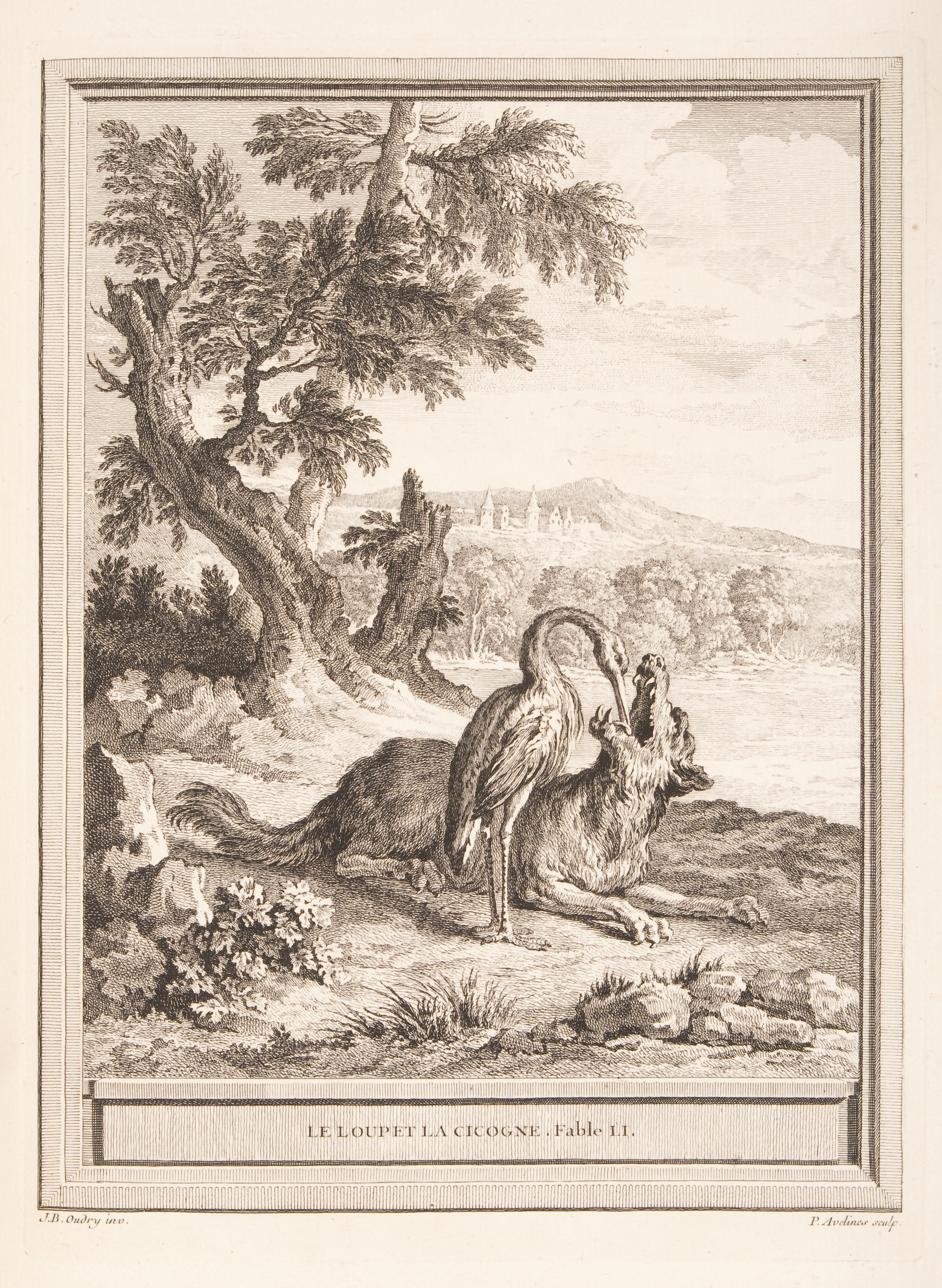
Jean de La Fontaine, Fables choisies, 1755–59 at Waddesdon Manor

It was about this time that the quartet of the Rue du Vieux Colombier, so famous in French literary history, was formed. It consisted of La Fontaine, Racine, Boileau and Molière, the last of whom was almost of the same age as La Fontaine, the other two considerably younger. Chapelain was also a kind of outsider in the coterie. There are many anecdotes, some evidently apocryphal, about these meetings. The most characteristic is perhaps that which asserts that a copy of Chapelain's unlucky Pucelle always lay on the table, a certain number of lines of which was the appointed punishment for offences against the company. The coterie furnished under feigned names the personages of La Fontaine's version of the Cupid and Psyche story, which, however, with Adonis, was not printed till 1669.

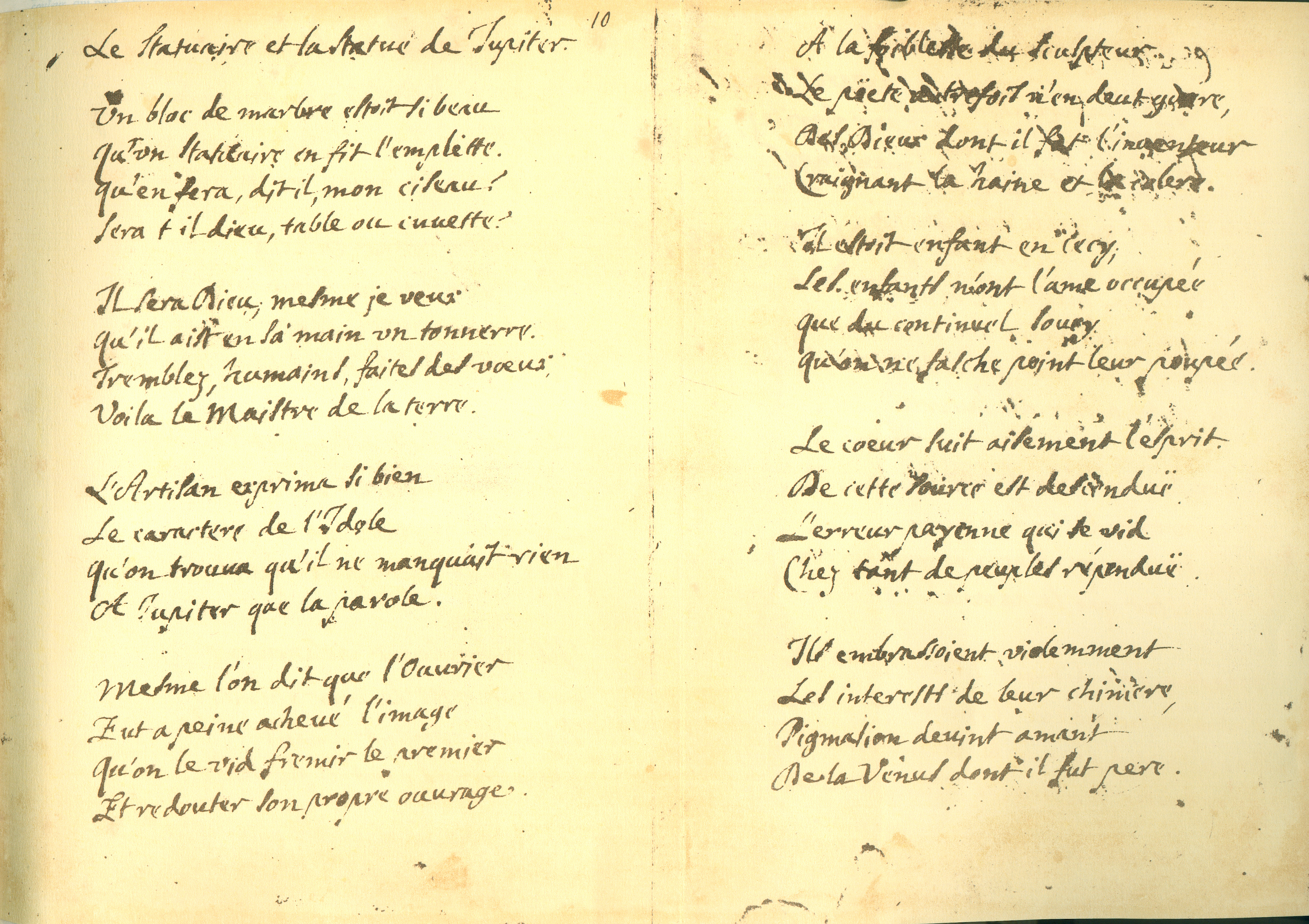
Facsimile of one of the very few manuscripts by Jean de La Fontaine

Meanwhile, the poet continued to find friends. In 1664 he was regularly commissioned and sworn in as gentleman to the duchess dowager of Orléans, and was installed in the Luxembourg Palace in Paris. He still retained his rangership, and in 1666 we have something like a reprimand from Colbert suggesting that he should look into some malpractices at Château-Thierry. In the same year appeared the second book of the Contes, and in 1668 the first six books of the Fables, with more of both kinds in 1671. In this latter year a curious instance of the docility with which the poet lent himself to any influence was afforded by his officiating, at the instance of the Port-Royalists, as editor of a volume of sacred poetry dedicated to the Prince of Conti.

A year afterwards his situation, which had for some time been decidedly flourishing, showed signs of changing very much for the worse. The duchess of Orléans died, and he apparently had to give up his rangership, probably selling it to pay debts. But there was always a providence for La Fontaine. Madame de la Sablière, a woman of great beauty, of considerable intellectual power and of high character, invited him to make his home in her house, where he lived for some twenty years. He seems to have had no trouble whatever about his affairs thenceforward; and could devote himself to his two different lines of poetry, as well as to that of theatrical composition.

=== Academy ===
In 1682 he was, at more than sixty years of age, recognized as one of the foremost men of letters of France. Madame de Sévigné, one of the soundest literary critics of the time, and by no means given to praise mere novelties, had spoken of his second collection of Fables published in the winter of 1678 as divine; and it is pretty certain that this was the general opinion. It was not unreasonable, therefore, that he should present himself to the Académie française, and, though the subjects of his Contes were scarcely calculated to propitiate that decorous assembly, while his attachment to Fouquet and to more than one representative of the old Frondeur party made him suspect to Colbert and the king, most of the members were his personal friends.

He was first proposed in 1682, but was rejected for Marquis de Dangeau. The next year Colbert died and La Fontaine was again nominated. Boileau was also a candidate, but the first ballot gave the fabulist sixteen votes against seven only for the critic. The king, whose assent was necessary, not merely for election but for a second ballot in case of the failure of an absolute majority, was ill-pleased, and the election was left pending. Another vacancy occurred, however, some months later, and to this Boileau was elected. The king hastened to approve the choice effusively, adding, Vous pouvez incessamment recevoir La Fontaine, il a promis d'etre sage.

His admission was indirectly the cause of the only serious literary quarrel of his life. A dispute took place between the academy and one of its members, Antoine Furetière, on the subject of the latter's French dictionary, which was decided to be a breach of the academy's corporate privileges. Furetière, a man of no small ability, bitterly assailed those whom he considered to be his enemies, and among them La Fontaine, whose unlucky Contes made him peculiarly vulnerable, his second collection of these tales having been the subject of a police condemnation. The death of the author of the Roman Bourgeois, however, put an end to this quarrel.

Shortly afterwards La Fontaine had a share in a still more famous affair, the celebrated Ancient-and-Modern squabble in which Boileau and Charles Perrault were the chiefs, and in which La Fontaine (though he had been specially singled out by Perrault for better comparison with Aesop and Phaedrus) took the Ancient side. About the same time (1685–1687) he made the acquaintance of the last of his many hosts and protectors, Monsieur and Madame d'Hervart, and fell in love with a certain Madame Ulrich, a lady of some position but of doubtful character. This acquaintance was accompanied by a great familiarity with Vendôme, Chaulieu and the rest of the libertine coterie of the Temple; but, though Madame de la Sablière had long given herself up almost entirely to good works and religious exercises, La Fontaine continued an inmate of her house until her death in 1693. What followed is told in one of the best known of the many stories bearing on his childlike nature. Hervart on hearing of the death, had set out at once to find La Fontaine. He met him in the street in great sorrow, and begged him to make his home at his house. J'y allais was La Fontaine's answer.

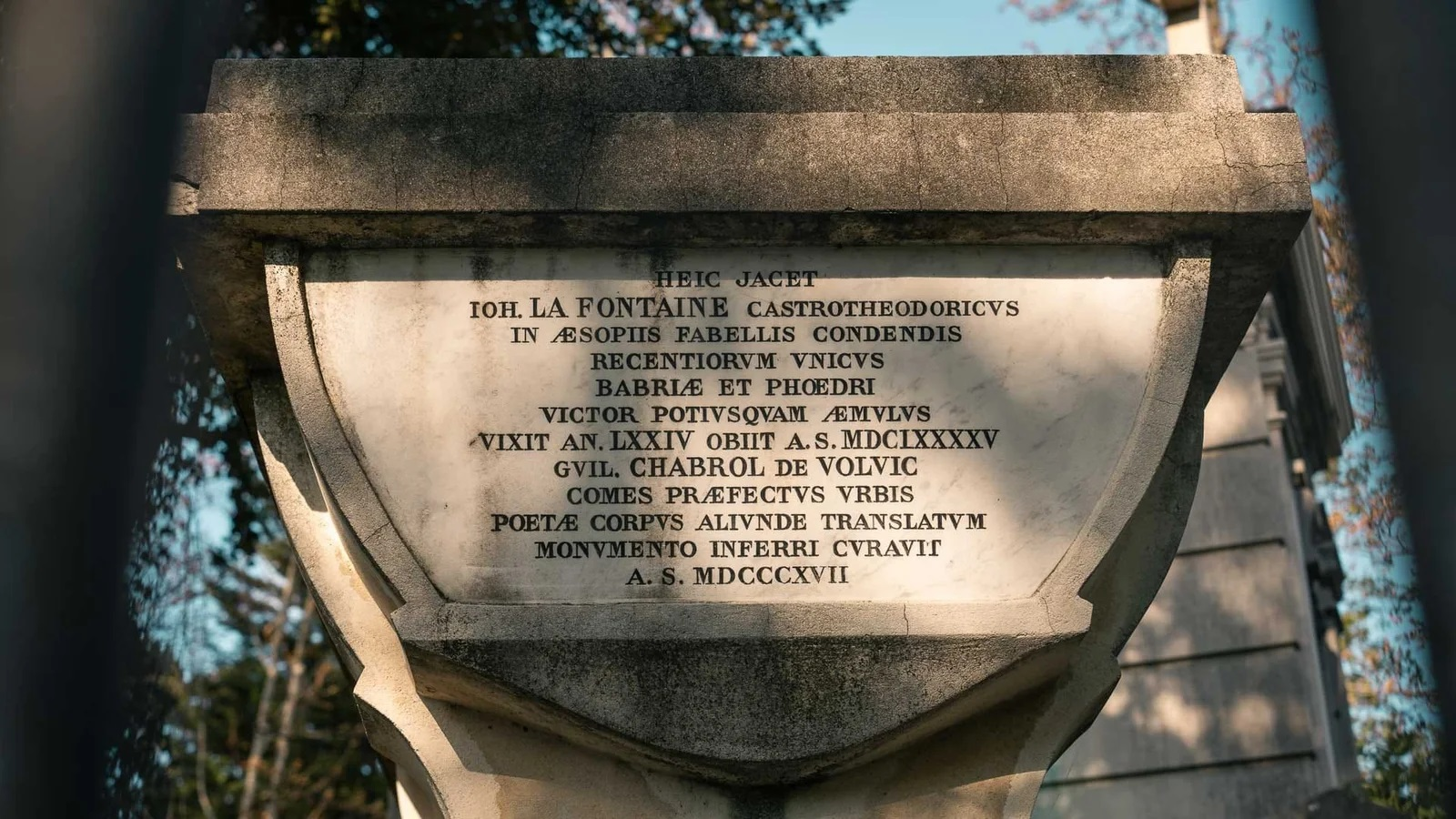
Grave of Jean de La Fontaine, Père Lachaise Cemetery, Paris

In 1692, the writer had published a revised edition of the Contes, although he suffered a severe illness. In that same year, La Fontaine converted to Christianity. A young priest, M. Poucet, tried to persuade him about the impropriety of the Contes and it is said that the destruction of a new play was demanded and submitted to as a proof of repentance. La Fontaine received the Viaticum, and the following years he continued to write poems and fables.

A story is told of the young duke of Burgundy, Fénelon's pupil, who was then only eleven years old, sending 50 louis to La Fontaine as a present of his own motion. But, though La Fontaine recovered for the time, he was broken by age and infirmity, and his new hosts had to nurse rather than to entertain him, which they did very carefully and kindly. He did a little more work, completing his Fables among other things; but he did not survive Madame de la Sablière much more than two years, dying on 13 April 1695 in Paris, at the age of seventy-three. When the Père Lachaise Cemetery opened in Paris, La Fontaine's remains were moved there. His wife survived him nearly fifteen years.

=== Anecdotes ===
The curious personality of La Fontaine, like that of some other men of letters, has been enshrined in a kind of legend by literary tradition. At an early age his absence of mind and indifference to business gave a subject to Gédéon Tallemant des Réaux. His later contemporaries helped to swell the tale, and the 18th century finally accepted it; these anecdotes include: La Fontaine meeting his son, being told who he was, and remarking, Ah, yes, I thought I had seen him somewhere!; his insisting upon fighting a duel with a supposed admirer of his wife, and then cheerily imploring the same to visit at his house just as before; his going into company with his stockings wrong side out; &c.—with, for a contrast, other tales of his awkwardness and silence, if not positive rudeness, in company.

La Fontaine was a special friend and ally of Benserade, Jean de La Bruyère's chief literary enemy. One of the chief authorities for these anecdotes is Louis Racine, who received them from his father, La Fontaine's attached friend for more than thirty years. Perhaps the best worth recording of all these stories is one of the Vieux Colombier quartet, which tells how Molière, while Racine and Boileau were exercising their wits upon le bonhomme ("the man") or le bon (both titles by which La Fontaine was familiarly known), remarked to a bystander, "Nos beaux esprits ont beau faire, ils n'effaceront pas le bonhomme," in English "no matter how fine our minds are, they won't erase 'le bonhomme'." (Note: i.e.: "No matter how hard our gifted minds may try, they shall not erase the man.") They have not.

== Works ==
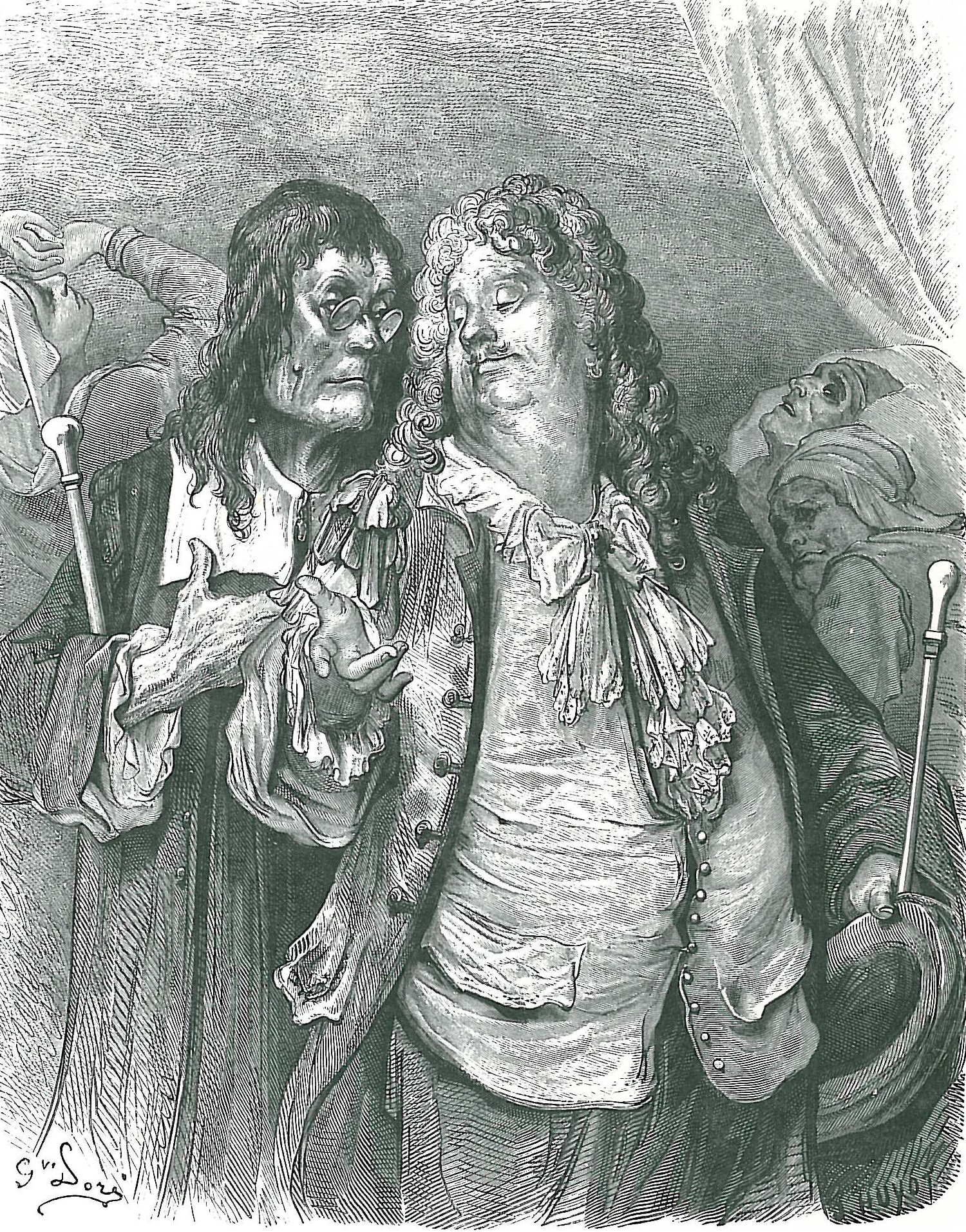
An illustration of "Les Médecins" (Fable V.12) by Gustave Doré, 1866

The numerous works of La Fontaine fall into three traditional divisions: the Fables, the Tales and the miscellaneous (including dramatic) works. He is best known for the first of these, in which a tradition of fable collecting in French verse reaching back to the Middle Ages was brought to a peak. Although these earlier works refer to Aesop in their title, they collected many fables from more recent sources. Among the foremost were Marie de France's Ysopet (1190) and Gilles Corrozet's Les Fables du très ancien Esope, mises en rithme françoise (1542).

The publication of the twelve books of La Fontaine's Fables extended from 1668 to 1694. The stories in the first six of these derive for the most part from Aesop and Horace and are pithily told in free verse. Those in the later editions are often taken from more recent sources or from translations of Eastern stories and are told at greater length. The deceptively simple verses are easily memorised, yet display deep insights into human nature. Many of the lines have entered the French language as standard phrases, often proverbial. The fables are also distinguished by their occasionally ironical ambivalence. The fable of "The Sculptor and the Statue of Jupiter" (IX.6), for example, reads like a satire on superstition, but its moralising conclusion that "All men, as far as in them lies,/Create realities of dreams" might equally be applied to religion as a whole.

The second division of his work, the tales (Contes et nouvelles en vers), were at one time almost equally as popular and their writing extended over a longer period. The first were published in 1664 and the last appeared posthumously. They were particularly marked by their archly licentious tone.

== Depictions and legacy ==
While the Fables have an international reputation, celebration of their author has largely been confined to France. Even in his own lifetime, such was his renown, he was painted by three leading portraitists. It was at the age of 63, on the occasion of his reception into the Académie française in 1684, that he was portrayed by Hyacinthe Rigaud. Nicolas de Largillière painted him at the age of 73, and a third portrait is attributed to François de Troy (see below).

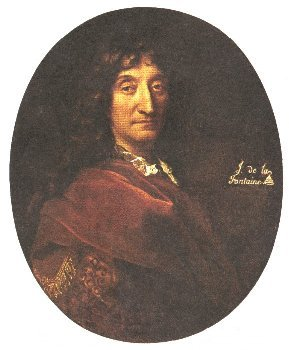
Portrait of La Fontaine attributed to François de Troy

Two contemporary sculptors made head and shoulders busts of La Fontaine. Jean-Jacques Caffieri's was exhibited at the Salon of 1779 and then given to the Comédie Française; Jean-Antoine Houdon's dates from 1782. There are in fact two versions by Houdon, one now at the Philadelphia Museum of Art, and another at the castle of his former patron Fouquet at Vaux-le-Vicomte (see below).

In Paris there is a full-length marble statue by Pierre Julien, now in the Louvre, that was commissioned in 1781 and exhibited at the 1785 Salon. The writer is represented in an ample cloak, sitting in contemplation on a gnarled tree on which a vine with grapes is climbing. On his knee is the manuscript of the fable of the fox and the grapes, while at his feet a fox is seated on his hat with its paw on a leather-bound volume, looking up at him. Small scale porcelain models were made of this by the Sèvres pottery and in polychrome porcelain by the Frankenthal pottery. In the following century small models were made of the bronze statue by Etienne Marin Melingue, exhibited in Paris in 1840 and in London in 1881. In this the poet is leaning thoughtfully against a rock, hat in hand. Also in the Cour Napoléon of the Louvre is the 1857 standing stone statue by Jean-Louis Jaley.

Another commemorative monument to La Fontaine was set up at the head of the Parisian Jardin du Ranelagh in 1891. The bronze bust designed by Achille Dumilâtre was exhibited at the Exposition Universelle (1889) before being placed on a high stone pedestal surrounded by various figures from the fables. The work was melted down, like many others during World War II, but was replaced in 1983 by Charles Correia's standing statue of the fabulist looking down at the fox and the crow on the steps and plinth below him.

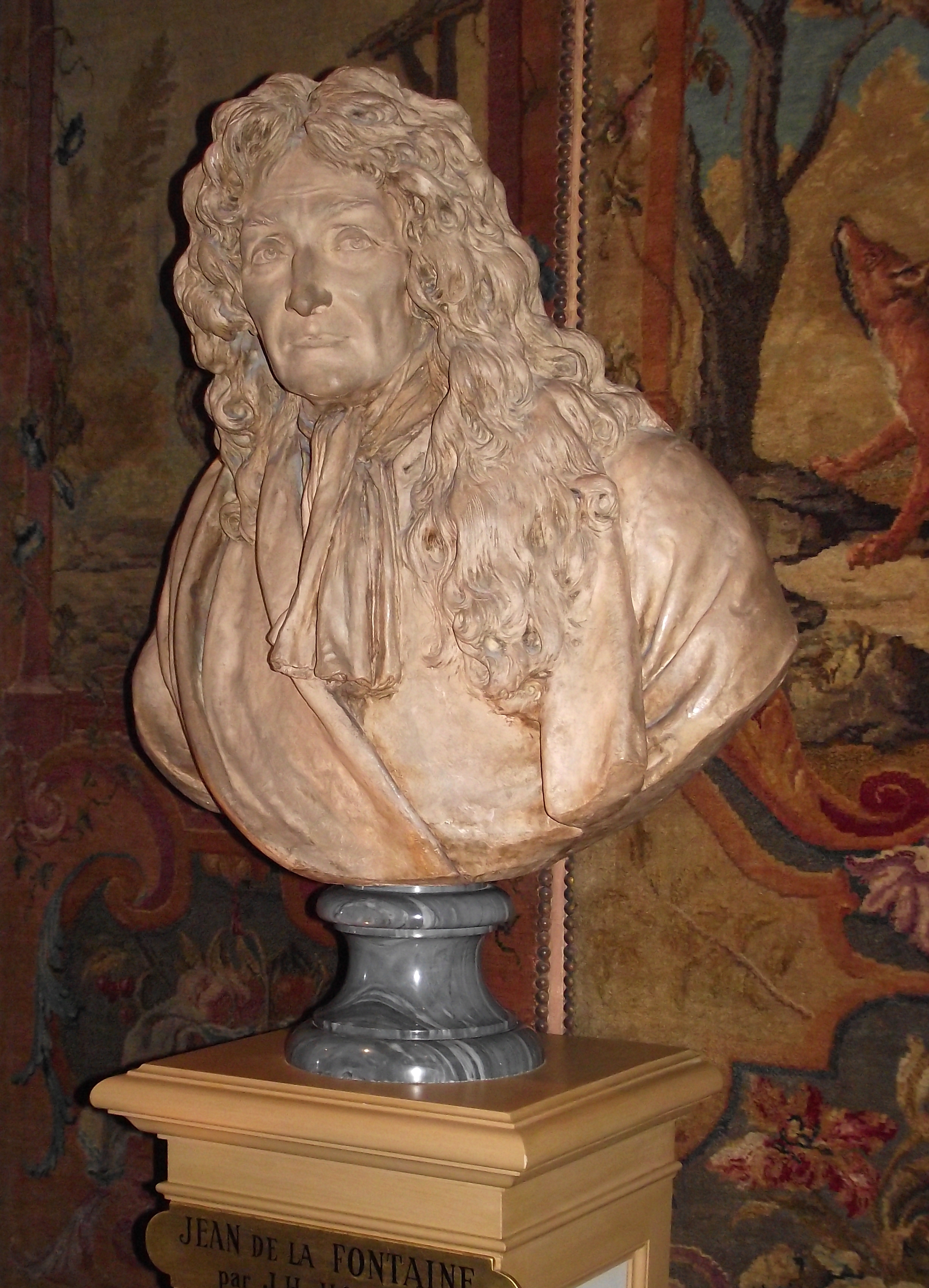
Jean-Antoine Houdon's bust of the fabulist at Vaux-le-Vicomte

There are more statues in Château-Thierry, the town of the poet's birth. The most prominent is the standing statue by Charles-René Laitié, which was ordered by command of Louis XVIII as a gift to the town. It was officially set in place in a square overlooking the Marne in 1824. During the Second Battle of the Marne it was damaged and was then moved about the town. Repaired now, its present position is in the square fronting the poet's former house. At his feet the race between the Tortoise and the Hare is taking place. The house itself has now been converted into a museum, outside which stands the life-sized statue created by Bernard Seurre. Inside the museum is Louis-Pierre Deseine’s head and shoulders clay bust of La Fontaine.

Further evidence of La Fontaine's enduring popularity is his appearance on a playing card from the second year of the French Revolution. In this pack royalty is displaced by the rationalist free-thinkers known as Philosophes, and the ironical fabulist figures as the King of Spades. He was no less popular at the Bourbon Restoration, as is evidenced by the royal commission of his statue. Besides that, there was the 1816 bronze commemorative medal depicting the poet's head, designed by Jacques-Édouard Gatteaux, in the Great Men of France series. More recently there has been a sideways seated view of him in the Histoire de France series. The head of La Fontaine also appeared on a 100 franc coin to commemorate the 300th anniversary of his death, on the reverse of which the fable of the fox and the crow is depicted. Another commemoration that year included the strip of 2.80 euro fable stamps, in the composite folder of which appeared a detachable portrait without currency. In 1995 equally, the asteroid 5780 Lafontaine was named in his honour.

Other appearances on postage stamps include the 55 centimes issue of 1938, with a medallion of the fable of The Wolf and the Lamb below him; and the Monaco 50-cent stamp commemorating the 350th anniversary of La Fontaine's birth in 1971, in which the head and shoulders of the fabulist appear below some of the more famous characters about which he wrote. Another coin series on which he appears is the annual Fables de La Fontaine celebration of the (Chinese) lunar new year. Issued since 2006, these bullion coins have had his portrait on the reverse and on the face each year's particular zodiac animal.

Fictional depictions have followed the fashionable view of La Fontaine at their period. As a minor character in Alexandre Dumas's novel The Vicomte of Bragelonne, he appears as a bumbling and scatterbrained courtier of Nicolas Fouquet. In the 2007 film Jean de La Fontaine – le défi, however, the poet resists the absolutist rule of Louis XIV after the fall of Fouquet.

La Fontaine's legacy also includes songs by composers such as Eugenie Santa Coloma Sourget, who set his texts to music.

== See also ==
- La Fontaine's Fables

== Sources ==
- Becker, Colette (2000), La Roman, Editions Bréal, ISBN 978-2749521213
