= Nicolas Coustou =

French sculptor and academic (1658–1733)

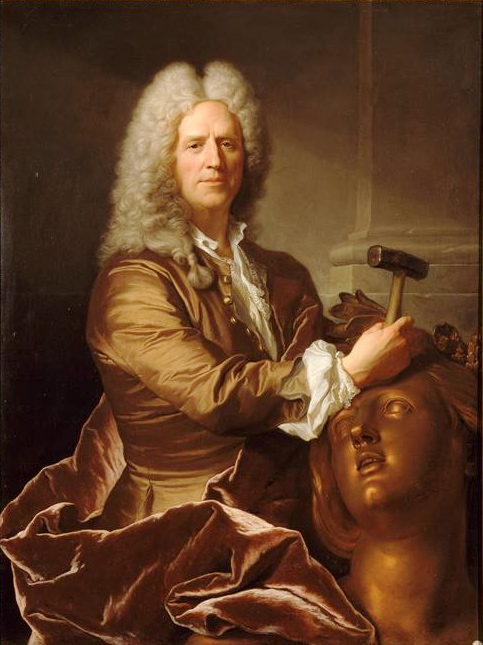
- Portrait of Nicolas Coustou at work, by Jean Le Gros (1710)
- Born: 9 January 1658; Lyon, France
- Died: 1 May 1733 (aged 75); Paris, France
- Education: C. A. Coysevox, Académie royale de peinture et de sculpture, Académie de France à Rome
- Known for: Sculpture
- Notable work: La Seine at la Marne, Berger Chasseur, Descent from the Cross, Julius Caesar
- Movement: Late French Baroque
- Awards: Prix de Rome

Nicolas Coustou (French: [nikɔla kustu]; 9 January 1658 – 1 May 1733) was a French sculptor and academic.

== Biography ==
Born in Lyon, Coustou was the son of a woodcarver, François Coustou, who gave him his first instruction in art, and Claudine Coysevox. When he was eighteen years old, in 1676, he moved to Paris, to study under C. Antoine Coysevox, his maternal uncle, who presided over the recently established Académie royale de peinture et de sculpture. At the age of twenty-three, Coustou won the Colbert prize (the Prix de Rome), which entitled him to four years of education at the French Academy at Rome. He subsequently became rector and chancellor of the Academy of Painting and Sculpture. From 1700, he worked with Coysevox at the palaces of Marly and Versailles.

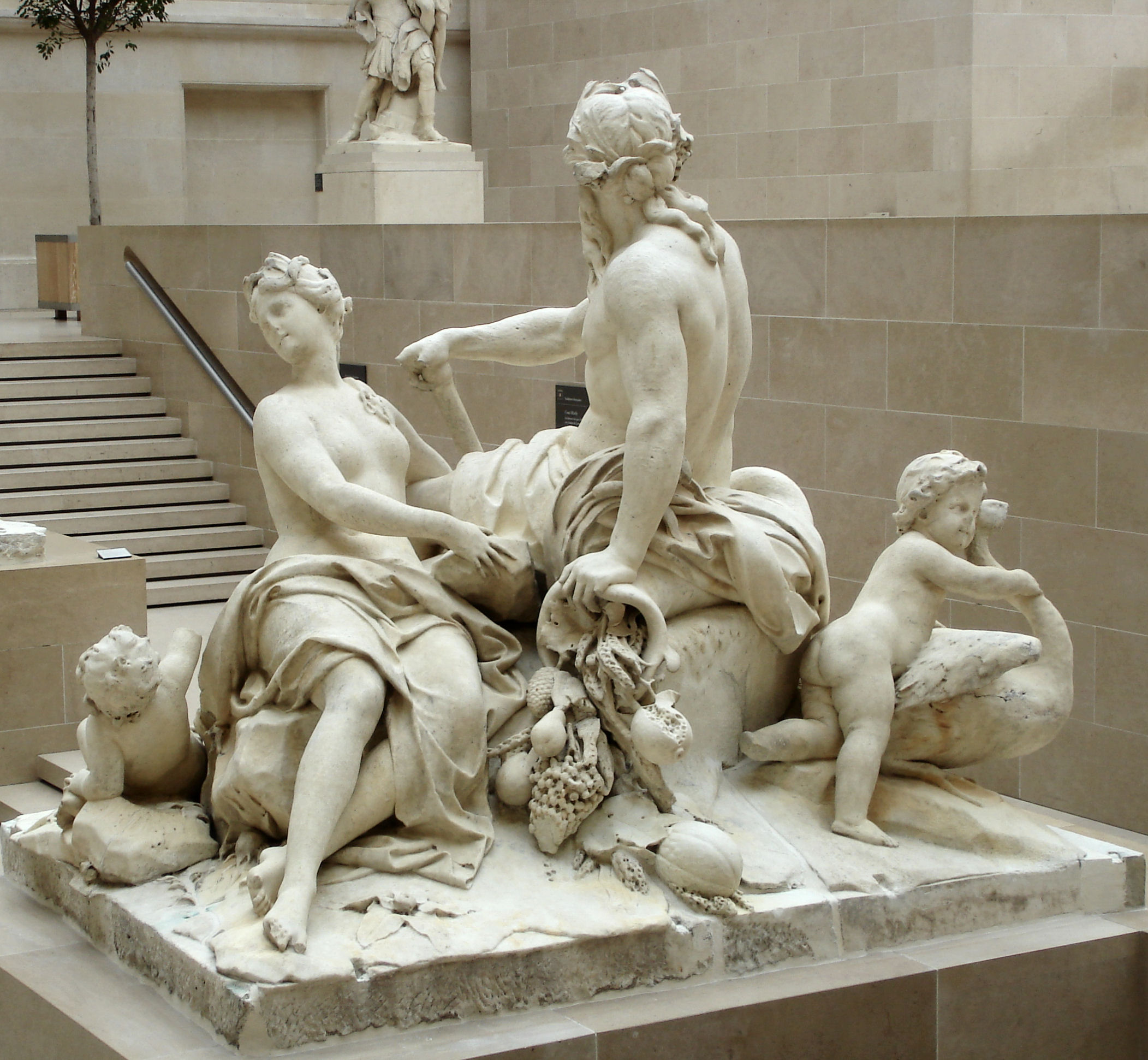
La Seine at la Marne

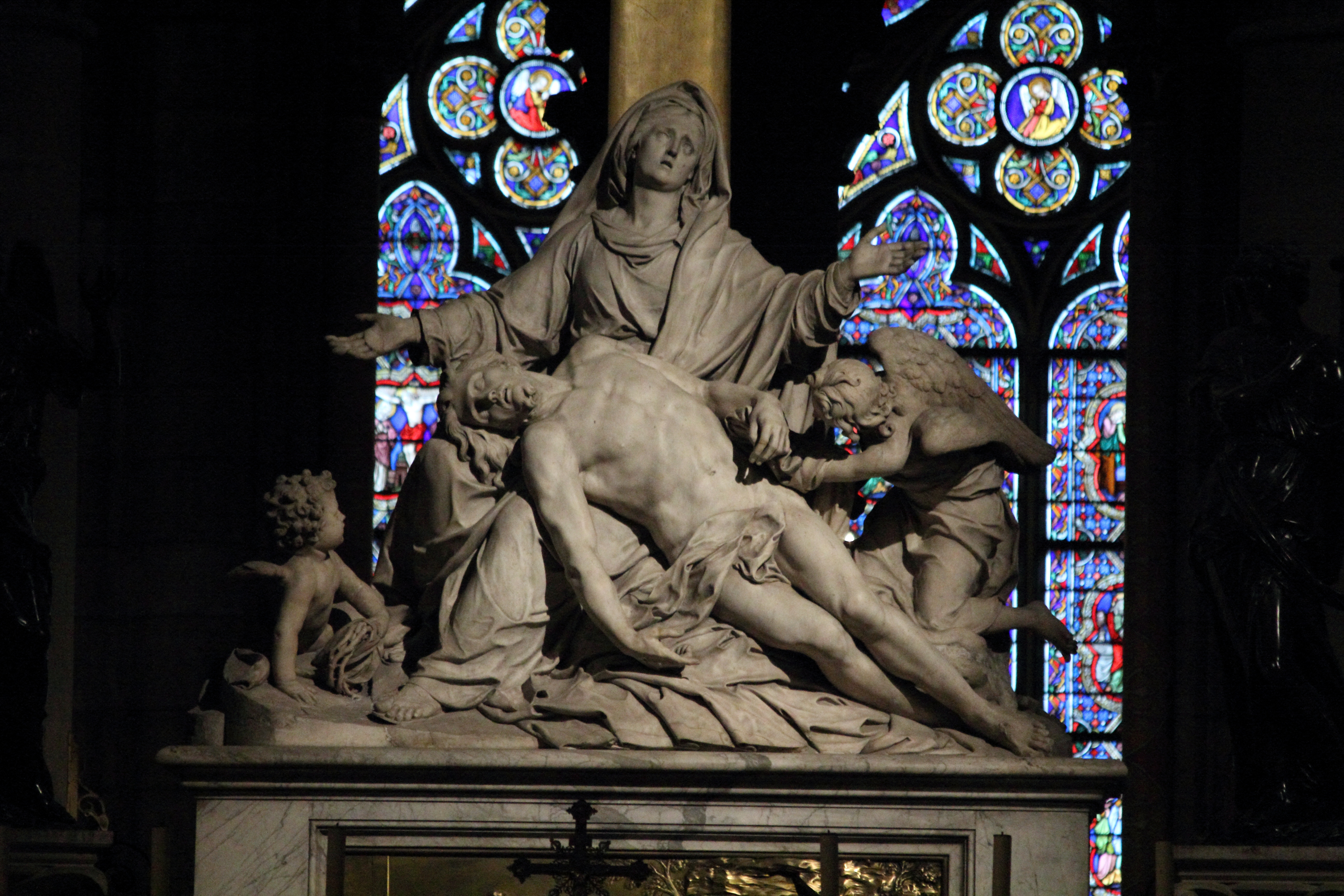
Descent from the Cross

He was remarkable for his facility. Influenced by Michelangelo and Algardi, he tried to combine the best characteristics of each.

A number of his works were destroyed during the French Revolution; the most famous of those that remain are "La Seine at la Marne", the "Berger Chasseur", and "Daphne Pursued by Apollo" in the gardens of the Tuileries, the bas-relief "Le Passage du Rhin" in the Louvre, the statues of Julius Caesar and Louis XV in the Louvre, and the "Descent from the Cross" behind the choir altar of the cathedral of Notre Dame de Paris. His sculpture of Apollo pursuing Daphne is one of a pair bearing the single title that was created with his younger brother, who is ascribed as the sculptor of Daphne. Both have been in the Louvre since 1940 and were restored between 2004 and 2006.

Regularly, he worked closely with his brother, Guillaume Coustou, also a renowned sculptor and director of the academy. Because of their collaborations, it is not always possible to ascribe a particular work to one or the other, thus one may find a single sculpture ascribed to each of them. His brother's son, Guillaume Coustou the Younger, also was a sculptor.

Nicolas Coustou died in Paris in 1733 at the age of 75.

== Works in public collections ==
- Beauvais, cathedral: tomb of Cardinal Forbin Janson, marble, after 1715.
- Brest: Méléagre tuant un sanglier, 1706.
- Lyon, place Bellecour : Allégorie de La Saône, 1720, sharing a pedestal with the Monument à Louis XIV by François-Frédéric Lemot.
- Paris, Notre-Dame cathedral: Descente de croix, marble group, also known as Le vœu de Louis XIV, 1713–1715, in the choir at Notre-Dame. (The figure of Louis XIII is by Nicolas Coustou, that of Louis XIV by Coysevox); Saint Denis, marble, 1721/22.
- Paris, jardin des Tuileries: La Seine et la Marne, a copy of the original in the Louvre.
- Paris, Musée du Louvre:
  - La Seine et la Marne, 1712.
  - Le Passage du Rhin, bas-relief.
  - Jules César, terracotta, study for a statue in marble at the Palace of Versailles.
  - Jules César, marble, in collaboration with François Girardon; commissioned in 1696 as a pendant to the Annibal de Soldtz, from the Tuileries gardens.
  - Louis XV en Jupiter, statue en marbre, 1731, commissioned by the Duc d’Antin, set up with its pendant, Marie Leszczynska en Junon de Guillaume Coustou in the gardens of the Château of Versailles.
  - Apollon poursuivant Daphné, marble, from 1713 to 1714. Paired with Daphné poursuivie par Apollon created by Guillaume Coustou the Elder.
  - Monument funéraire du prince François Louis de Bourbon-Conti, marble; once in the church of Saint-André-des-Arts in the 6^{e} arrondissement.
  - Le Dieu de la Santé Montrant à la France le Buste de Louis XIV, marble, 1693, 90 x 75 cm.
  - Le gladiateur Borghèse, terracotta; copy of an ancient marble, 1683.
  - Chasseur au repos (also known as) Adonis se reposant de la chasse ou Le repos du chasseur, marble group from 1710; commissioned in 1707 by the Bâtiments du roi, along with the Nymphe de la chasse and Nymphe et la colombe.
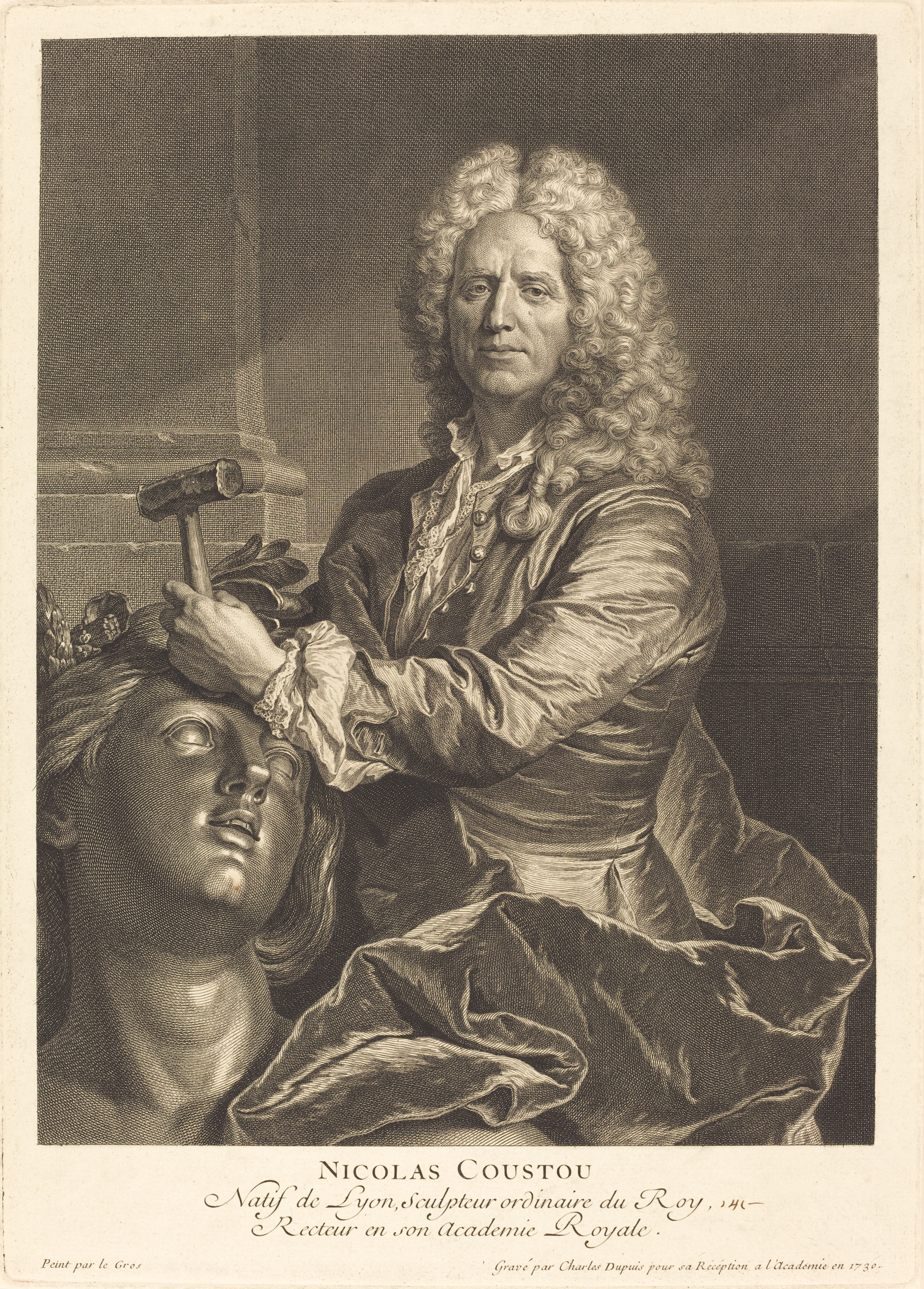
    Charles Dupuis, Nicolas Coustou, 1730. Engraving. National Gallery of Art, Washington, Ailsa Mellon Bruce Fund, 1979.25.2
- Versailles, park of the château: Hercule Comode and Bath of Apollo, 1705 –1706.
- Versailles, Grand Trianon: Decoration of the cornice of the king's bedroom, and Jean-Baptiste Colbert, bust in marble, ca. 1715
- Seignelay, église Saint-Martial: Ange de la Résurrection, bas-relief in marble.
