= Eugenie de Santa Coloma Sourget =

French composer

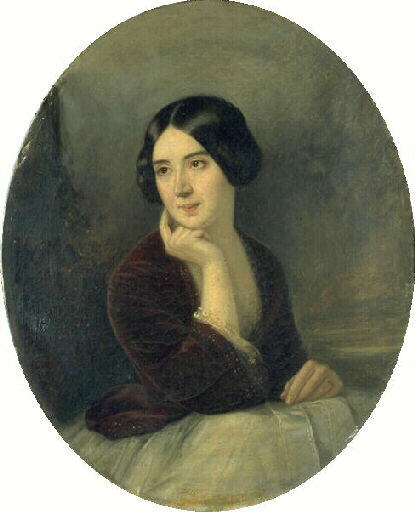
Eugénie de Santa Colona Sourget by Louis Mousquet

Jeanne Marie Eugénie de Santa Coloma Sourget (née de Santa Coloma; 8 February 1827 - 11 June 1895) was a French composer, pianist, and singer who composed an opera and sang at the Paris Opera.

Santa Coloma was born in Bordeaux to Marie Virgine Gazagne Bouguette and Eugenio Maria de Santa Coloma Lezica. Her father was the Consul of Chile and Consul General of Argentina in France.

Santa Coloma showed early musical ability and began piano lessons at age 5 after she heard a song on the street and reproduced it perfectly on her family's piano at home. She studied music with Arregui (not further identified), Henri Bertini, Charles Louis Colin (the father of French composer Charles Colin), Mme. Dufresne (not further identified), and Pierre-Joseph-Guillaume Zimmerman. She also studied orchestration with Costard de Mézeray. After hearing her sing in Paris, opera composer Fromental Halévy offered to write a role for her to sing. She debuted at the Paris Opera in 1847 and married M. Sourget in 1849. Louise Bertin and Paul Lacome dedicated songs to her.

In her will, Santa Coloma left a bequest of 5,000 francs to the Paris Conservatory. The interest was to be awarded each year to the male or female student who received first prize in singing, piano and composition. It was awarded to the following individuals:

- 1897 Mr. Hans (singer)
- 1898 M. L. Levy (piano)
- 1899 Mr. Ganave (unspecified)
- 1900 M. Cesbron (singing).

Santa Coloma's music was published by E. Gerard et Cie, Escudier Freres, and Joseph Meissonnier. Her compositions included:

== Works ==
=== Chamber ===
- String Trio

=== Opera ===
- L'image

=== Piano ===
- pieces

=== Vocal ===
- "A une jeune fille" (text by Victor Hugo)
- "C'est ton nom"
- "Chant du crepuscule" (text by Victor Hugo)
- "Chant Madeleine"
- "La Cigale et la fourmi" (text by Jean de la Fontaine)
- "Une Etoile"
