= Vadans, Jura =

Vadans
- Commune
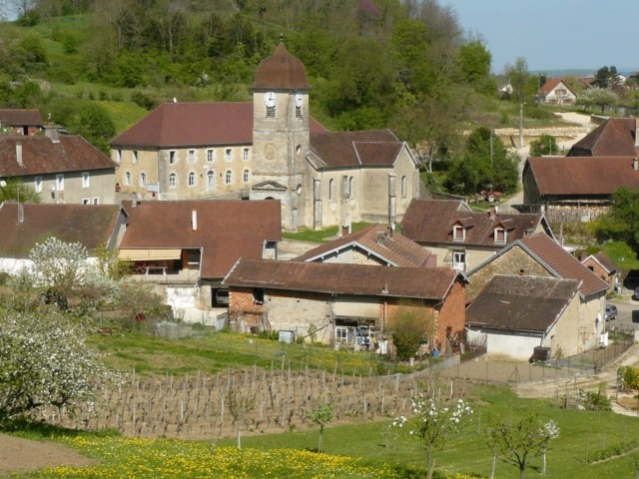
- General view of Vadans

- Coat of arms
- Location of Vadans
- Location within France Location within Bourgogne-Franche-Comté
- Coordinates: 46°56′05″N 5°42′10″E
- Country: France
- Region: Bourgogne-Franche-Comté
- Department: Jura
- Arrondissement: Dole
- Canton: Arbois

Government
  - Mayor (2020–2026): Henri Dorbon
- Area^{1}: 11.25 km^{2} (4.34 sq mi)
- Highest elevation: 323 m (1,060 ft)
- Lowest elevation: 235 m (771 ft)
- Population (2023): 306
  - Density: 27.2/km^{2} (70.4/sq mi)
- Time zone: UTC+01:00 (CET)
  - Summer (DST): UTC+02:00 (CEST)
- INSEE/Postal code: 39539 /39600
- ^{1} French Land Register data, which excludes lakes, ponds, glaciers > 1 km^{2} (0.386 sq mi or 247 acres) and river estuaries.

Vadans (French pronunciation: [vadɑ̃]) is a commune in the Jura department in the Bourgogne-Franche-Comté region in eastern France.

== Population ==
Historical population
Year	Pop.	±% p.a.
1968	212	—
1975	204	−0.55%
1982	211	+0.48%
1990	256	+2.45%
1999	268	+0.51%
2007	272	+0.19%
2012	256	−1.21%
2017	278	+1.66%
2023	306	+1.61%
Source: INSEE

== See also ==
- Communes of the Jura department
