= Pierre Julien =

French artist (1731–1804)

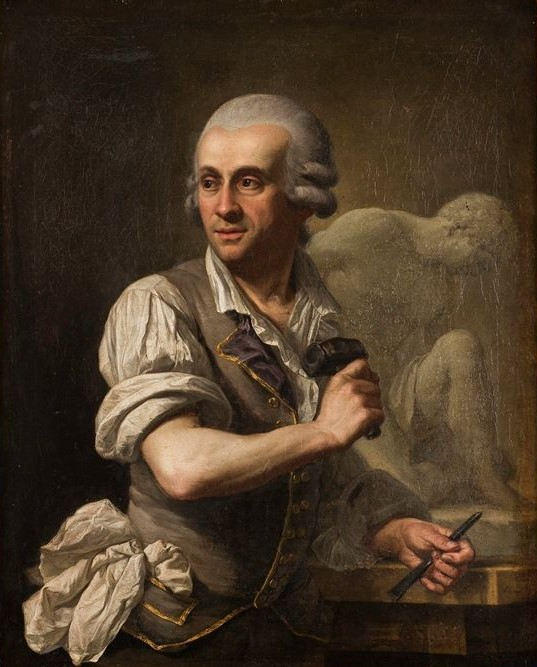
Julien sculpting Gladiateur mourant ("Dying gladiator"), c. 1778

Pierre Julien (20 June 1731 – 17 December 1804) was a French sculptor. He studied under Guillaume Coustou the Younger and in 1765 won a Prix de Rome. He later attended the French Academy in Rome before returning to Paris, where on his second attempt he was admitted to the Académie royale de peinture et de sculpture. Charles Claude Flahaut, Count of Angiviller, commissioned him to produce life-size sculptures of Jean de La Fontaine and Nicolas Poussin. Another commission from the Count of Angiviller saw Julien create the decorative scheme for a dairy at Rambouillet, designed for Marie-Antoinette. This included a sculpture of the Greek mythological figure Amalthea as well as friezes and medallions.

== Biography ==
Julien was born on 20 June 1731 in the commune of Saint-Paulien in south-central France. He learned under a sculptor named Gabriel Samuel in Le Puy-en-Velay, near Saint-Paulien, after Julien's uncle noticed his artistic ability. He studied at the École de dessin of Lyon, then entered the Parisian atelier of Guillaume Coustou the Younger. On 31 August 1765, he received a Prix de Rome for his Albinus Offering His Chariot to the Vestals, a bas-relief depicting a subject from classical antiquity. Julien then entered the École royale des élèves protégés, which offered a special course of study under the direction of the painter Louis-Michel van Loo. He was a pensionnaire at the French Academy in Rome, 1768 to 1773, where he was influenced by the tide of neoclassicism that affected his fellow students.

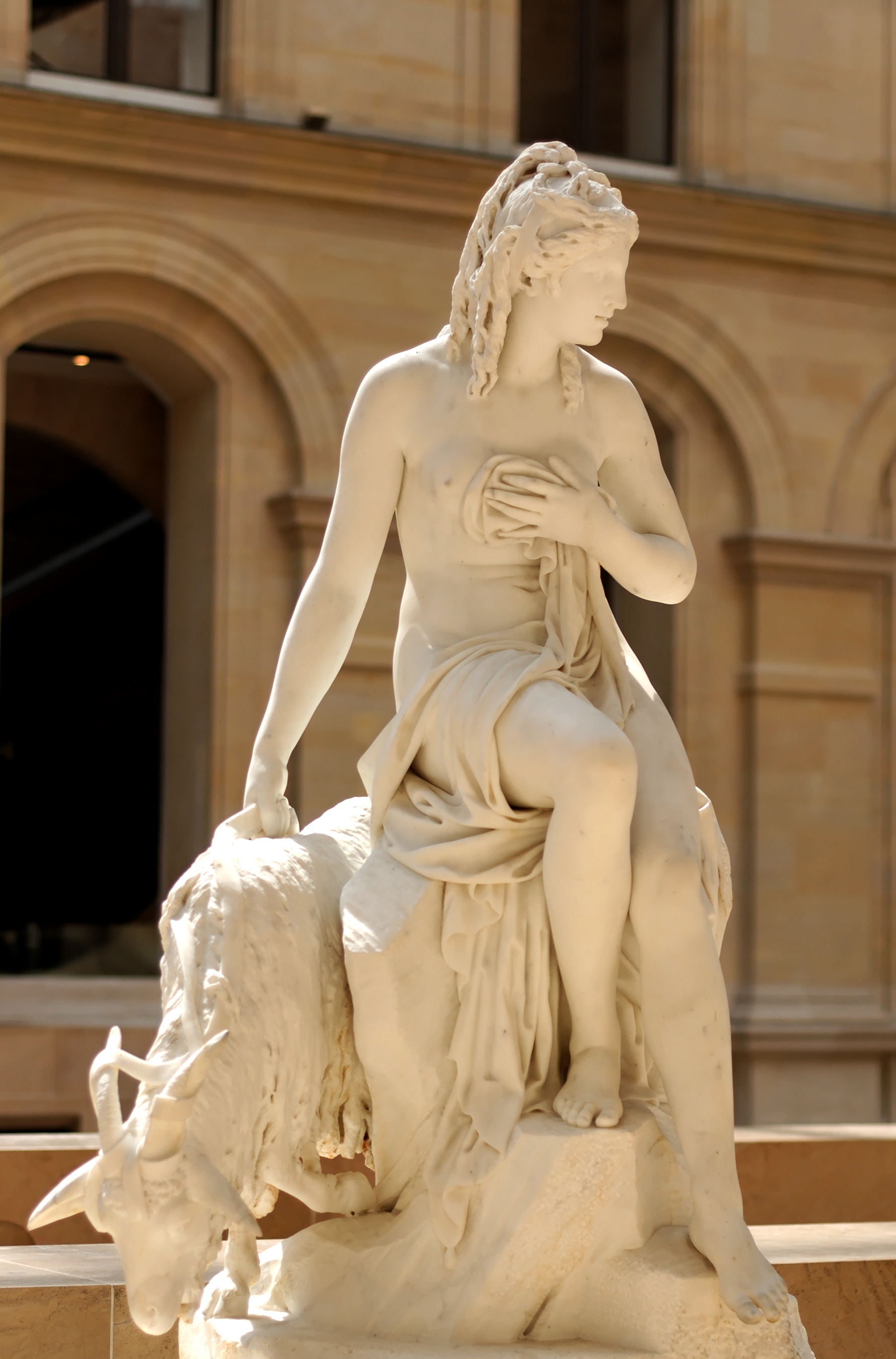
Amalthée et la chèvre de Jupiter ('Amalthea and Jupiter's goat') by Pierre Julien. Commissioned in 1785 for Marie Antoinette's dairy at Rambouillet

After this, Julien made his way back to Paris, where he continued working under Coustou. He made a marble copy of the so-called Cleopatra, the Vatican's Sleeping Ariadne, which remains at Versailles. He worked on the sculpture for the mausoleum of Louis, le Grand Dauphin in the cathedral of Sens. Julien failed in 1776 to be admitted to the Académie royale de peinture et de sculpture, having submitted his Ganymede; his resultant dejection and indignance prompted him to consider retiring and living in Rochefort, where workers who could create the prows of ships were needed. In 1779, Julien successfully made his way into the Académie with his Dying Gladiator. When it was exhibited at the Salon of 1779, this work elicited much praise – only sustaining criticism for having overly delicate hands – and it caught the eye of Charles Claude Flahaut, Count of Angiviller.

Julien received commissions from the Count of Angiviller (director of the Bâtiments du Roi) on behalf of Louis XVI for two sculptures in a suite of life-size depictions of great men of France. These sculptures were Jean de La Fontaine, produced 1783–1785, and Nicolas Poussin, produced 1789–1804. The latter sculpture represented Poussin in his nightclothes, which were depicted as similar in appearance to the draperies of a Roman toga. In 1785, the Count of Angiviller commissioned Julien to create the decorative scheme for a dairy at Rambouillet, designed for Marie-Antoinette. The statue Amalthea, which depicted Amalthea, the nurse of Zeus in Greek mythology, was to be the central artistic element of the dairy; in Michael Levey's judgement, this was "probably always the sculptor's most famous work". Julien turns the antique Amalthea into a young woman with full hips, her pose echoing the Venus de' Medici. The other works Julien created for the dairy were two friezes and six medallions, all of which had classical subjects. These bas-reliefs were sold at auction in 1819, but were retrieved by the State in 2005, thanks to a gift from the son of the great dealer-collector Daniel Wildenstein.

Julien was named one of the original members of the Institut de France in 1795. Before his death, he became a chevalier of the Légion d'Honneur.

== Major works ==
- Gladiateur mourant, marble, 1779, Musée du Louvre.
- Ganymède versant le nectar à Jupiter changé en aigle, marble group, 1776–1778, Paris, musée du Louvre
- Jean de La Fontaine, marble, 1783-85. Musée du Louvre
- Nicolas Poussin, marble, 1789 - 1804. Musée du Louvre
- Nicolas Poussin terracotta sketch model, about 1787 - 1788. Musée du Louvre
- Amalthée et la chèvre de Jupiter, marble group, 1787 for the Laiterie at Rambouillet. Laiterie de la Reine at Rambouillet
- La Jeune fille à la chèvre, terracotta statuette, 1786. Musée du Louvre
- Sainte Geneviève rendant la vue à sa mère, terracotta bas-relief, 1776. Musée du Louvre
