= Guillaume Coustou the Younger =

French sculptor

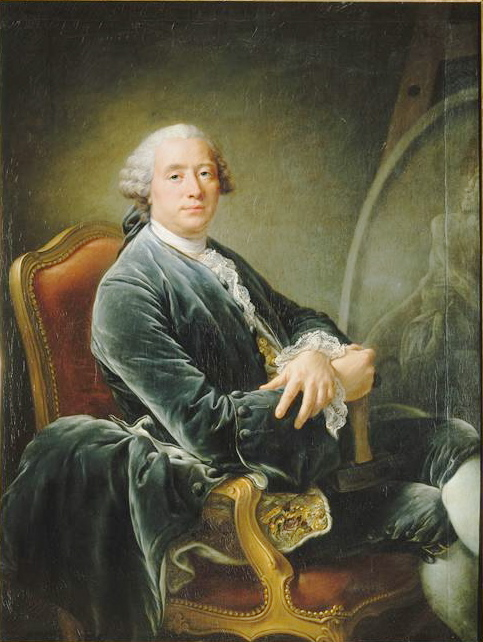
- Guillaume Coustou the Younger by François-Hubert Drouais (1758); Versailles, Musée national du Château et des Trianons
- Born: 19 March 1716; Paris
- Died: 13 July 1777 (aged 61); Paris
- Known for: Sculpture
- Movement: Baroque and Style Louis XIV

Guillaume Coustou the Younger (French pronunciation: [ɡijom kustu]; 19 March 1716 – 13 July 1777) was a French sculptor of the late French Baroque or Style Louis XIV, and early neo-classicism.

== Life and career ==
The son of Guillaume Coustou the Elder and nephew of Nicolas Coustou, he trained in the family atelier and studied at the French Academy in Rome, 1736–39, as winner of the Prix de Rome (1735). He returned to Paris, where he completed the famous "Horse Tamers" (Chevaux de Marly) commissioned from his father in 1739 for Marly, when the elder Coustou was too infirm to actively carry out the commissions. They were completed and installed in 1745.

He was accepted at the Académie Royale de Peinture et de Sculpture (1742) and pursued a successful official career, working fluently in styles that ranged from the Late Baroque of his morceau de réception, a Seated Vulcan (illustrated) to the sentimental early neoclassicism of the Ganymede, whose affinities with Roman sculptures of Antinous have been suggested by Michael Worley. He produced portrait busts as well as his religious and mythological subjects.

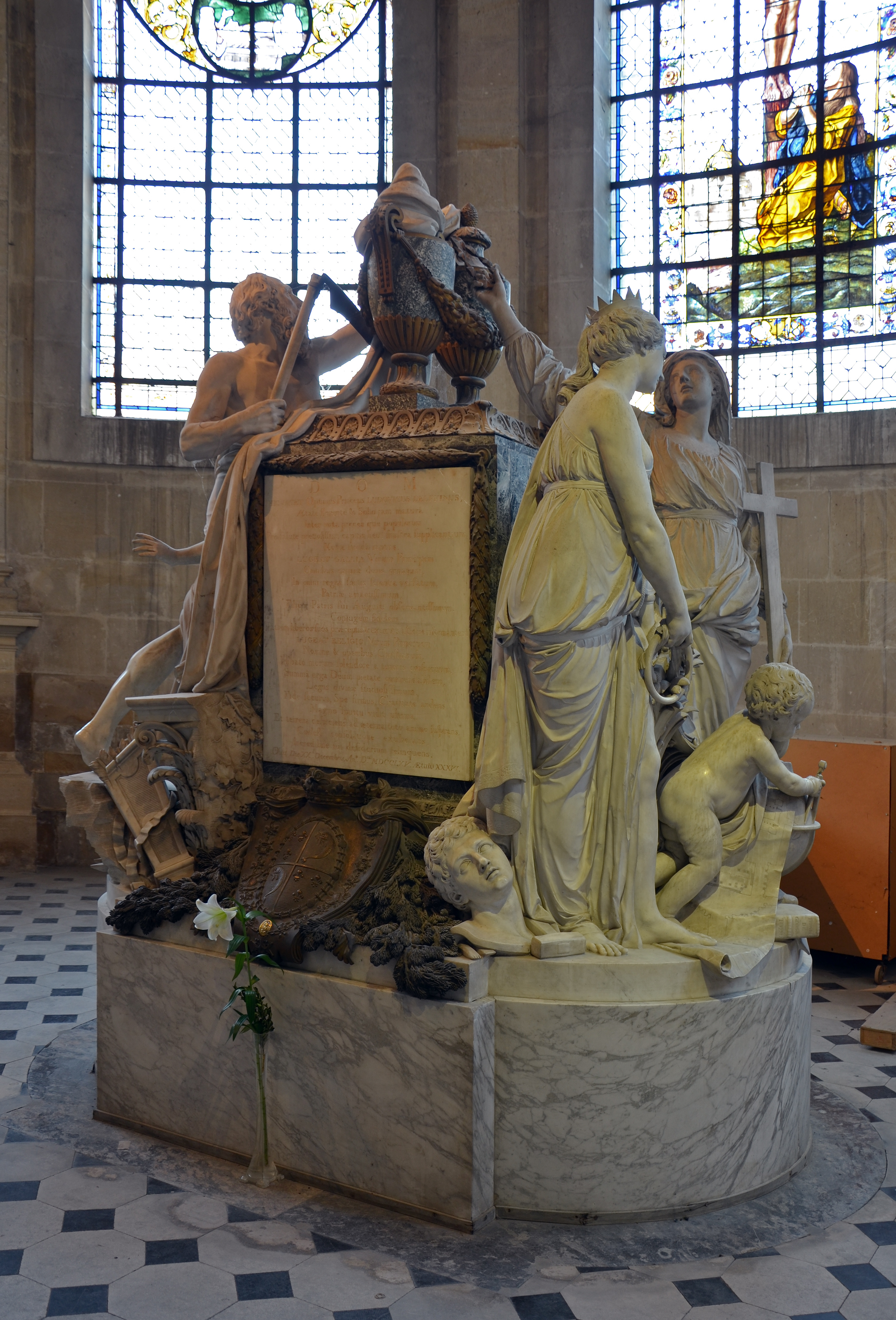
The Tomb of Louis, Dauphin of France & Marie-Josephe of Saxony, in Sens Cathedral. Started by Coustou and finished by Julien.

His most prominent and ambitious official commission was the Monument to the Dauphin for the cathedral of Sens. The elaborate iconography of its somewhat overcharged design was worked up by the artist and connoisseur Charles-Nicolas Cochin.

His pupils included two minor neoclassical sculptors, Claude Dejoux and Pierre Julien, who were fellow pupils in the 1760s and went on to collaborate on sculptural projects and the young Danish sculptor, Johannes Widewelt, who was placed in his workshop through the offices of the secretary of the Danish legation. In the process, Widewelt picked up some of Coustou's clarity and his language of rhetorical gesture.

== Works ==
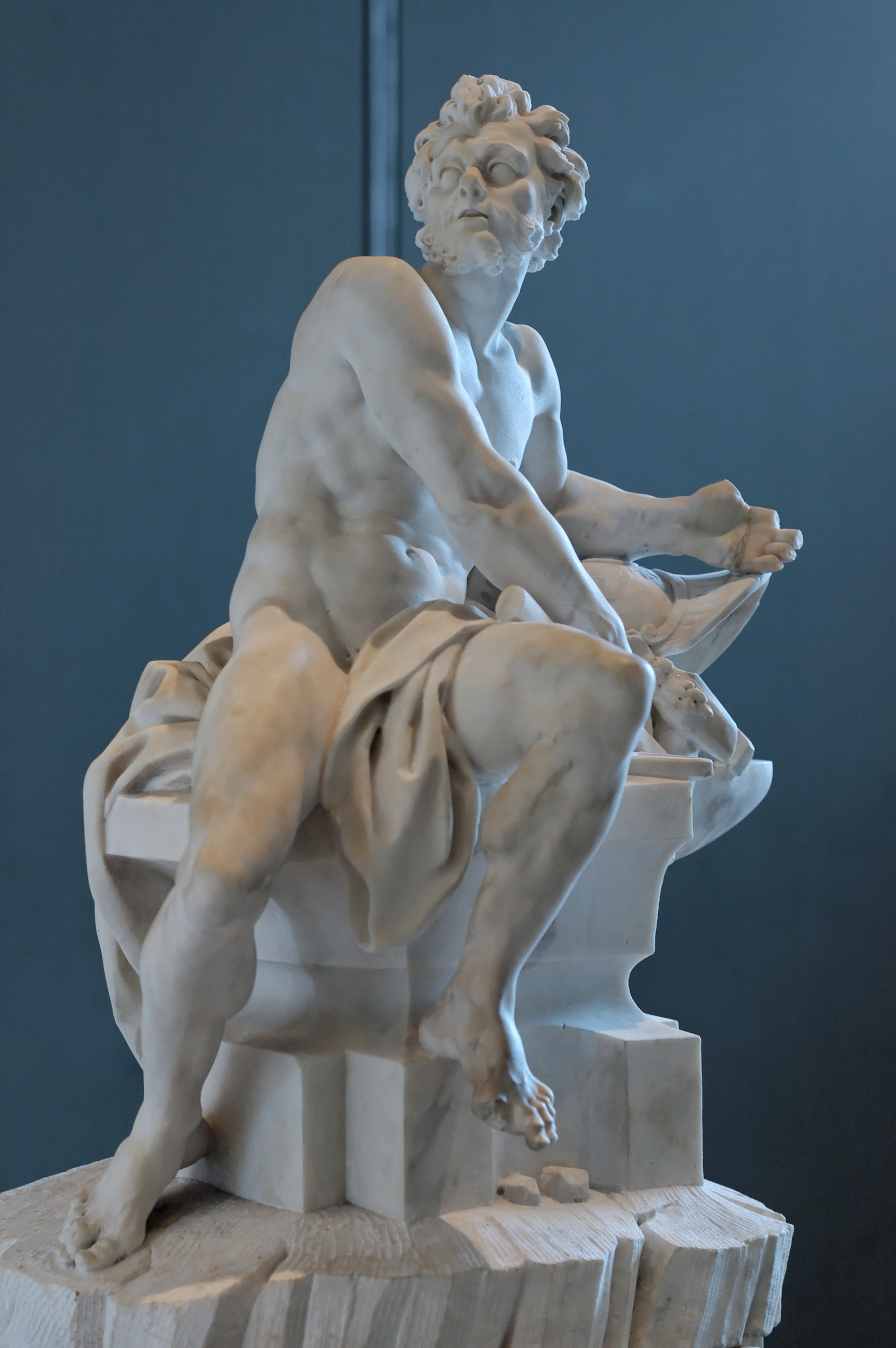
Vulcain, Coustou's reception piece for the Académie Royale, 1742 (Louvre)

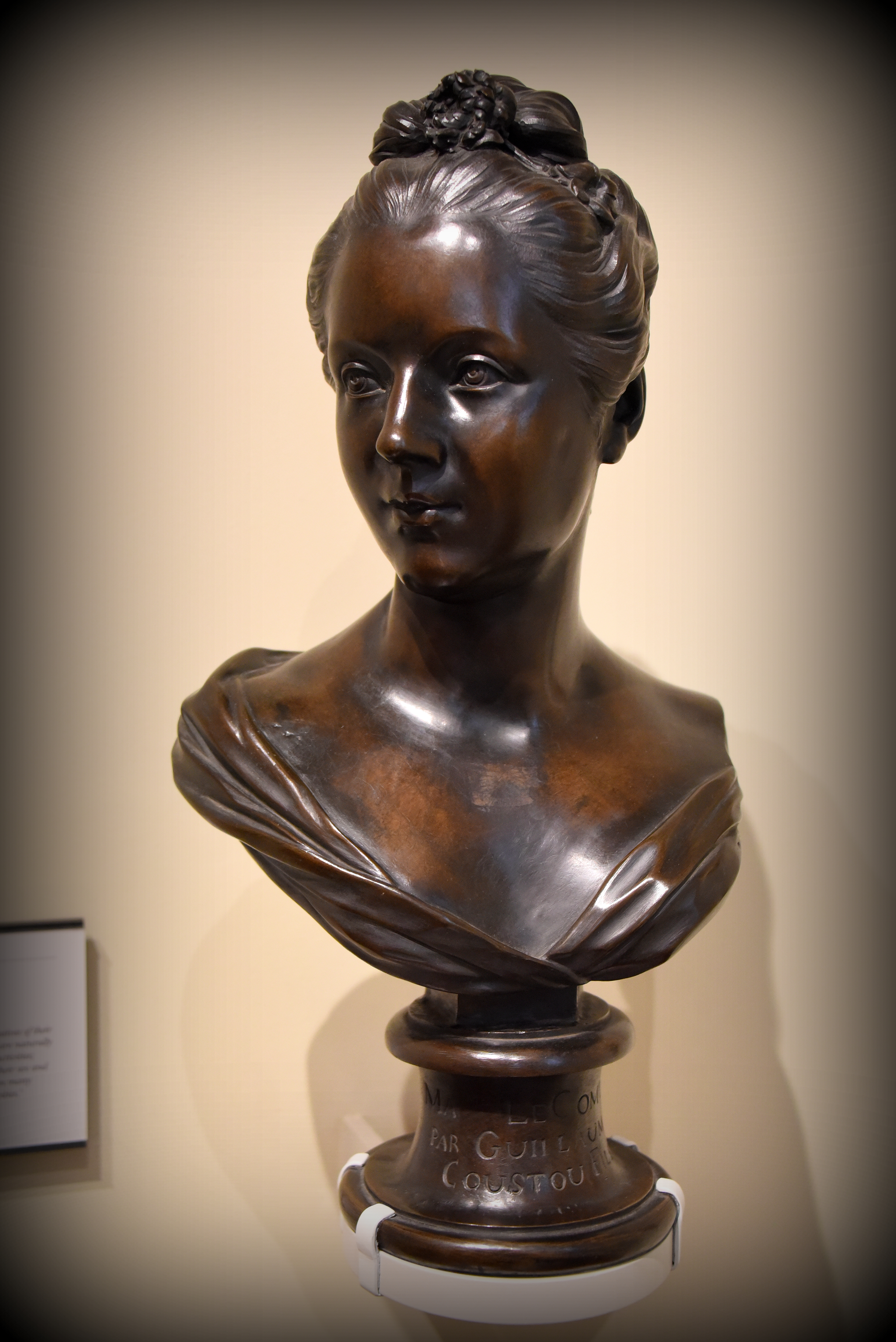
Bronze bust of Marguerite Le Comte, 1750. By Guillaume Coustou II. From Paris, France. The Victoria and Albert Museum, London

- Apotheosis of St Francis Xavier (marble, c. 1743) Bordeaux, Church of St Paul)
- Marguerite Le Comte (bronze, c. 1750), The Victoria and Albert Museum, London
- Apollo (marble, 1753) commissioned by Mme de Pompadour for the park at the château de Bellevue (at Versailles)
- Mars and Venus (marble, 1769) for Frederick II of Prussia at Schloss Sanssouci, Potsdam
- Pediment sculptures, (limestone, 1753 onwards) executed with Michelange Slodtz for Ange-Jacques Gabriel’s twin hôtels (from 1753) on the Place de la Concorde
- Ganymede (marble, ca 1760 (Victoria and Albert Museum)
- Funeral Monument to the Dauphin, (free-standing marble and bronze, 1766–77), Sens Cathedral
