= Louis-Denis Caillouette =

French sculptor

Louis-Denis Caillouette (French: [lwi dəni kajuɛt]; 9 May 1790 – 8 February 1868) was a French sculptor. His pupils included the medallist Adrien Baudet

== Life ==
Born in Paris, the son of André Louis Caillouette, he studied at the École des beaux-arts de Paris in Philippe-Laurent Roland's studio. In 1809, he won third place in the prix de Rome with Marius in the Ruins of Carthage. Financial problems forced him to seek non-artistic work and it was only around 1816 that he recommenced training in a studio, this time that of Pierre Cartellier, winning second place in the prix de Rome competition in 1818. Having reached the age limit for the competition, he shifted into commercial production of small bronzes and accepting state commissions for restoring earlier sculptures.

In 1836 Caillouette, Dupuis l'Aîné and Dupuis Jeune jointly opened a free drawing school for workers of the faubourg Saint-Denis in the cour des Petites-Écuries of the former 3rd arrondissement of Paris (now in the 10e). Three times a week, they held two hour lessons at 8 pm, attended by hundreds of workers, who thus increased their income. The school also trained painter decorators, porcelain painters, gold engravers and ornamental sculptors. The city authorities allocated 4200 francs to help run the school, which held an exhibition in 1840 at the mairie (town hall) of the former 3rd arrondissement.

Louis-Denis Caillouette lived at 8 rue Cassette à Paris. He was a member of the Société libre des beaux-arts de Paris and died in Paris.

== Paris Salon works ==
- 1822 :
  - Bust of Jacques Ruisdaël, bought by the French state;
  - Mathematics, bas-relief for the Éléphant de la Bastille fountain;
  - A Fisherman, plaster, 2nd class medal
- 1824 :
  - The Immaculate Conception;
  - Architecture, bas-relief;
  - Psyche Abandoned;
  - Justice;
  - Asia;
  - Europe.
- 1827 : Architecture.
- 1831 : Louis-Philippe I.
- 1840 : Saint Elizabeth, stone statue
- 1847 :
  - Madonna and Child, plaster;
  - Eucharis Abandoned by Telemachus, plaster;
  - Jean-Pierre Cortot, bronze.

== Restoration ==
- Saint-Germain-l'Auxerrois, Paris : The Chancellor of Aligre and His Son, by Laurent Magnier (1618–1700), restored around 1838.
- place de la Concorde, Paris : Chevaux de Marly, by Guillaume Coustou, restored in 1840.

== Bibliography ==
- Louis Lafitte, Entrée triomphale de S.A.R. monseigneur le duc d'Angoulême, généralissime de l'armée des Pyrénées, Paris, Éd. Didot père & Fils, 1825.
- F. Grille, Autographes de savants, d'artistes, connus et inconnus…, Paris, Pédoyen, 1853.
- Inventaire général des richesses d'art de la France. Paris : monuments civils, Paris, t.I, Éd. Plon et Cie, 1879.
- Émile de La Chavignerie et Louis Auvray, Dictionnaire général des artistes de l'école française depuis l'origine des arts du dessin jusqu'en 1882, peintres, sculpteurs, architectes, graveurs et lithographes, Paris, Veuve H. Loones, Librairie Renouard, 1882.
- Louis Courajod, Histoire du département de la sculpture moderne au Musée du Louvre, Paris, E. Leroux, 1894.
- Revue de l'art français ancien et moderne, Paris, Charavay, Jean Schemit, 1897.
- Jean Bayet, Les édifices religieux XVII^{e}, XVIII^{e}, XIX^{e} siècles, Paris, Librairie Renouard, H. Laurens, 1910, 268 p., 64 pl.
- Stanislas Lami, Dictionnaire des sculpteurs de l'école française au XVIIIe siècle, 2.vol., Éd. Honoré Champion, 1910–1911.
- Bernard Vassor, Histoire des rues de Paris, Cour des Petites-Écuries, Histoire et Vies du X^{e}, Paris.
- Revue de Paris (Paris 1829)-(Paris 1844), Bibliothèque de l'INHA.
- Autographes, Carton 37, Sculpteurs Cab-Cra, Bibliothèque de l'Institut national d'histoire de l'art, collections Jacques Doucet.
