= Jacques-François Delyen =

French painter (1684–1761)

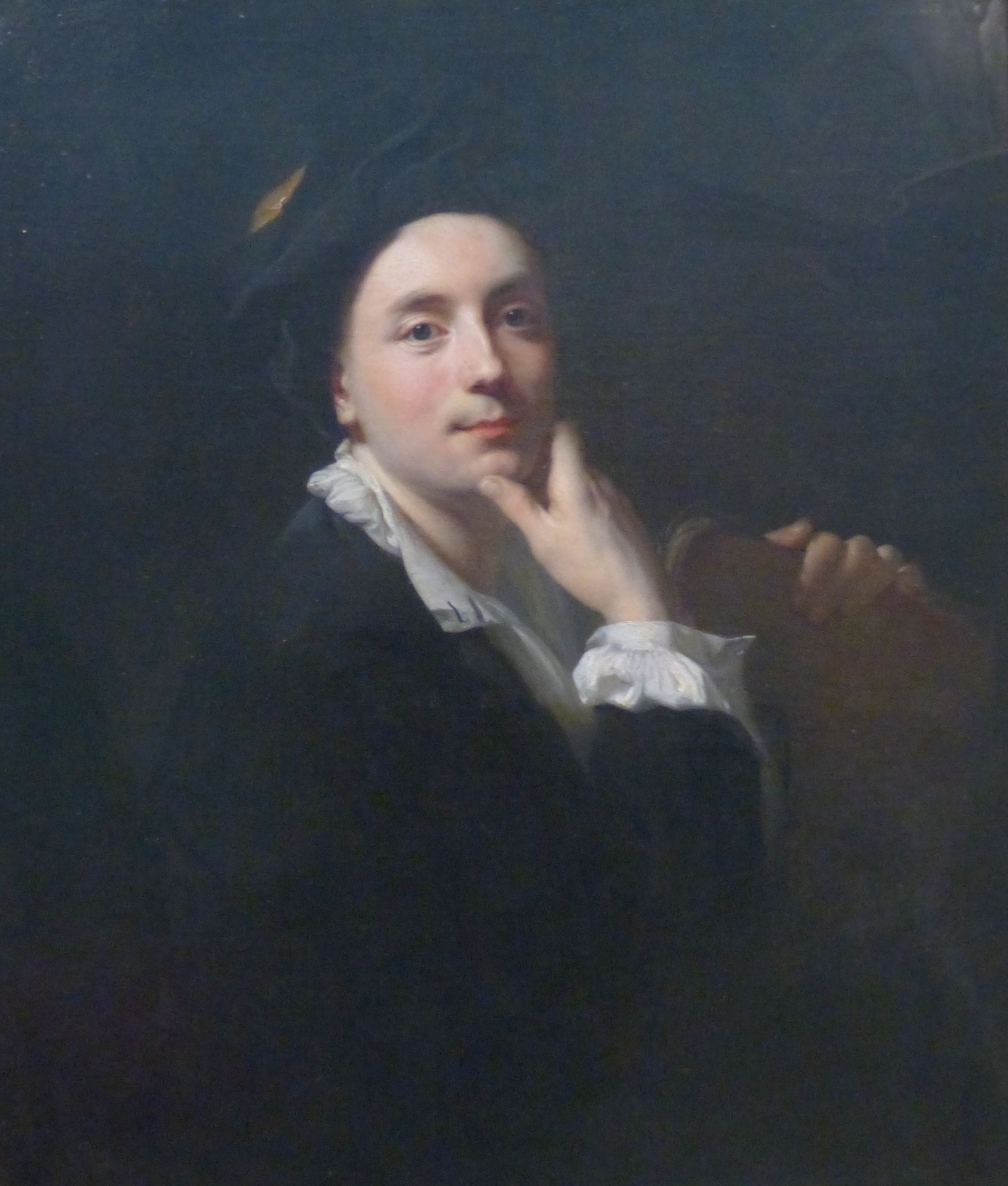
- Self-portrait (Musée des beaux-arts de Nîmes)
- Born: 25 July 1684; Ghent, Belgium
- Died: 3 March 1761 (aged 76); Paris, France
- Education: Académie royale de peinture et de sculpture
- Occupation: Painter

Jacques-François Delyen (25 July 1684 – 3 March 1761) was a French painter, specializing in portraits.

== Life ==
Delyen was born in Ghent. As an apprentice of Nicolas de Largillierre from 1710 to 1715. He was influenced by his works and style. In 1725, Deylen was admitted to the Académie royale de peinture et de sculpture (Royal Academy of Painting and Sculpture) based on his Academy pieces and his portraits of Nicolas Bertin and Guillaume Coustou. He exhibited his works regularly in the Academy between 1737 and 1747, before his demise in Paris on 3 March 1761.

His 'Portrait dit de Jean de Paty de Rayet, seigneur du Rayé' was auctioned in 2014 for $7,607.

== Selected works ==
=== Self-portraits ===
- c. 1710–1715, Zurich, coll. Rau.
- 1714, Nîmes, musée des Beaux-Arts.
- c. 1720–1725, vente Paris, galerie Georges Petit, 5 December 1929, lot. 7.

=== Portraits ===
- Portrait of the artist's mother, 1714, Nîmes, musée des Beaux-Arts.
- Portrait of Claude-Bernard Rousseau, v. 1710–1715, galerie Marcus en 1984.
- Portraits of François la Goille de Courtagnon, maître des Eaux-et-Forêts de Champagne and his wife, 1724, Vente Paris, Galleria, 11 April 1962, lots 29 & 30.
- La Marmotte, 1731, galerie Marcus en 1965.
- Portrait of a man, 1739, galerie Heim en 1956.
- Portrait of a woman at the well, 1742, Orléans, musée des Beaux-arts.
- Man drinking under a vine, salon de 1745.
- Portrait of Nicolas René Berryer, lieutenant de police, 1750, Troyes, musée des Beaux-arts.
- Portrait of Nicolas René Berryer, navy minister, engraved by Jean-Georges Wille after Delyen, Versailles, musée national du château.
- Portrait of Guillaume Coustou, sculpteur, 1725, Versailles, musée national du château.
- Portrait of Nicolas Bertin, peintre, travaillant au dessin préparatoire pour son tableau Bacchus et Ariane, 1725, Versailles, musée National du château.
- Portrait of Monsieur de Solmaquier hunting, 1738, Vente Paris, hôtel Drouot (Cornette de Saint-Cyr), 13 décembre 2006, lot. 54.
- Portrait of a seated woman in a white dress. Pastel signed bottom left : « Lyen 1713 ». Vente Paris, hôtel Drouot (Ferri), 14 November 2004, lot. 25.
- Portrait of René Aubert d'Aubeuf, abbé of Vertot, historian of the Order of Malta. Engraved by Laurent Cars after Delyen.

== Bibliography ==
- (in French) Wallens (Gérard de), Jacques-François Delyen. Un gantois à Paris au XVIIIe siècle, in Objectifmag.be (site internet d'informations régionales du Namurois), April 2003.
- (in German) Wallens (Gérard de), « Delyen (Jacques-François) », in Allgemeines Künstlerlexikon. vol. 26, Munich, 2000.
- (in French) Wallens (Gérard de), « Les deux morceaux de réception de Jacques-François Delyen (Gand 1684 – Paris 1761). Étude matérielle, historique, technique et stylistique », in La Revue des Archéologues et Historiens d'Art de Louvain (1994), Louvain-La-Neuve, 1996.
- Brême, Dominique (April 1997). "L'art du portrait sous Louis XIV". Somogy (in French) (37): 52.

== Sources ==
- "Delyen, Jean François or Jacques François or Jans". Benezit Dictionary of Artists. 2011.

== Gallery ==
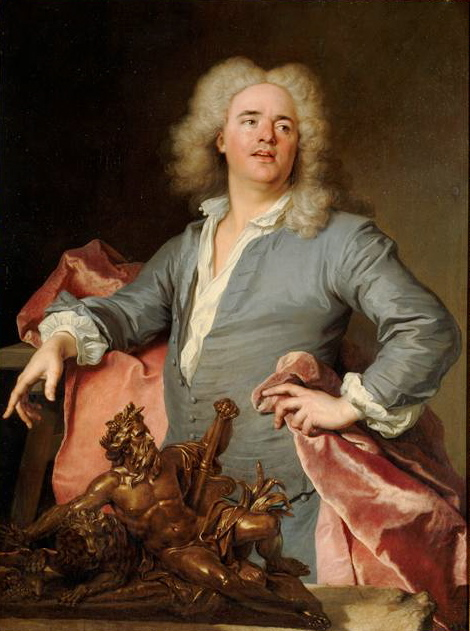
Guillaume Coustou the Elder, 1724

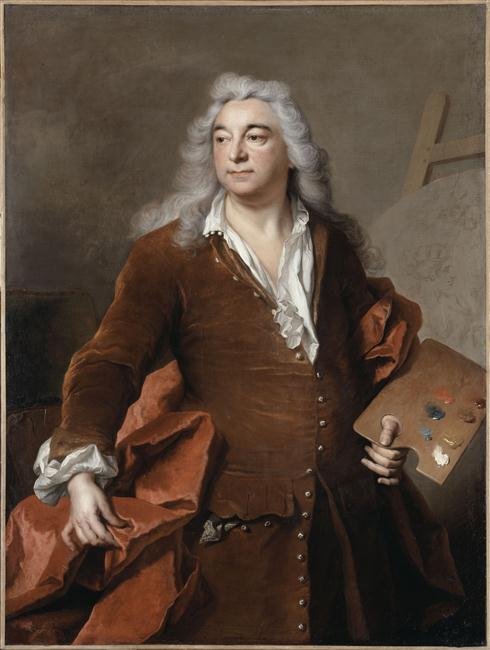
Nicolas Bertin, 1725

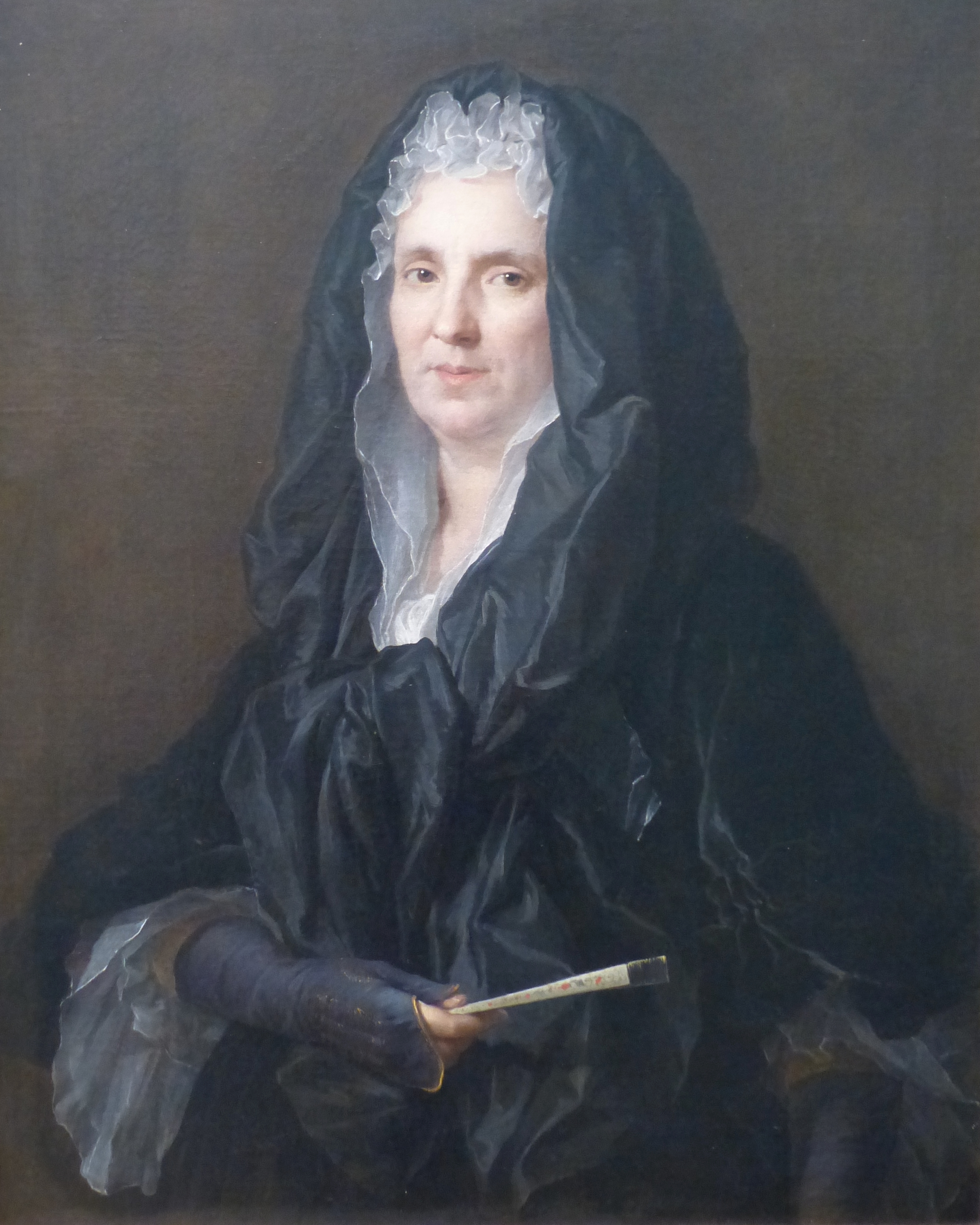
Madame Delyen, the artist's mother, 1714, musée des beaux-arts de Nîmes
