= Wrestlers (sculpture) =

Roman sculpture after a Greek original

Coordinates: 43°46′04″N 11°15′19″E

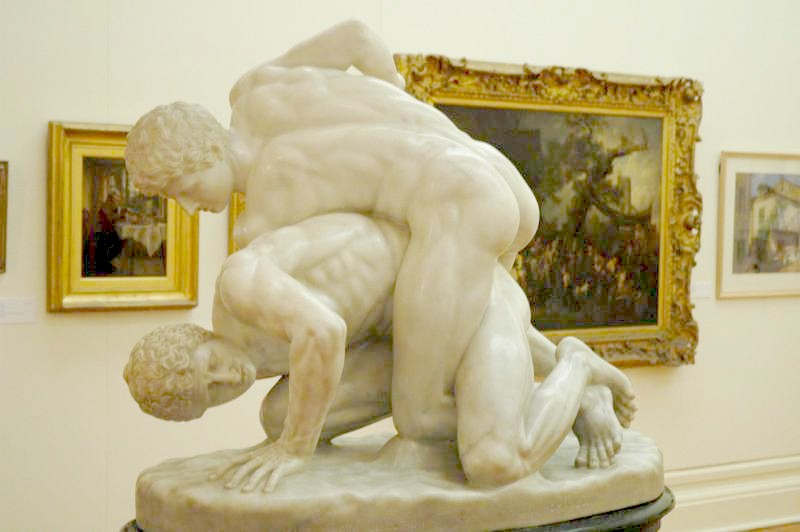
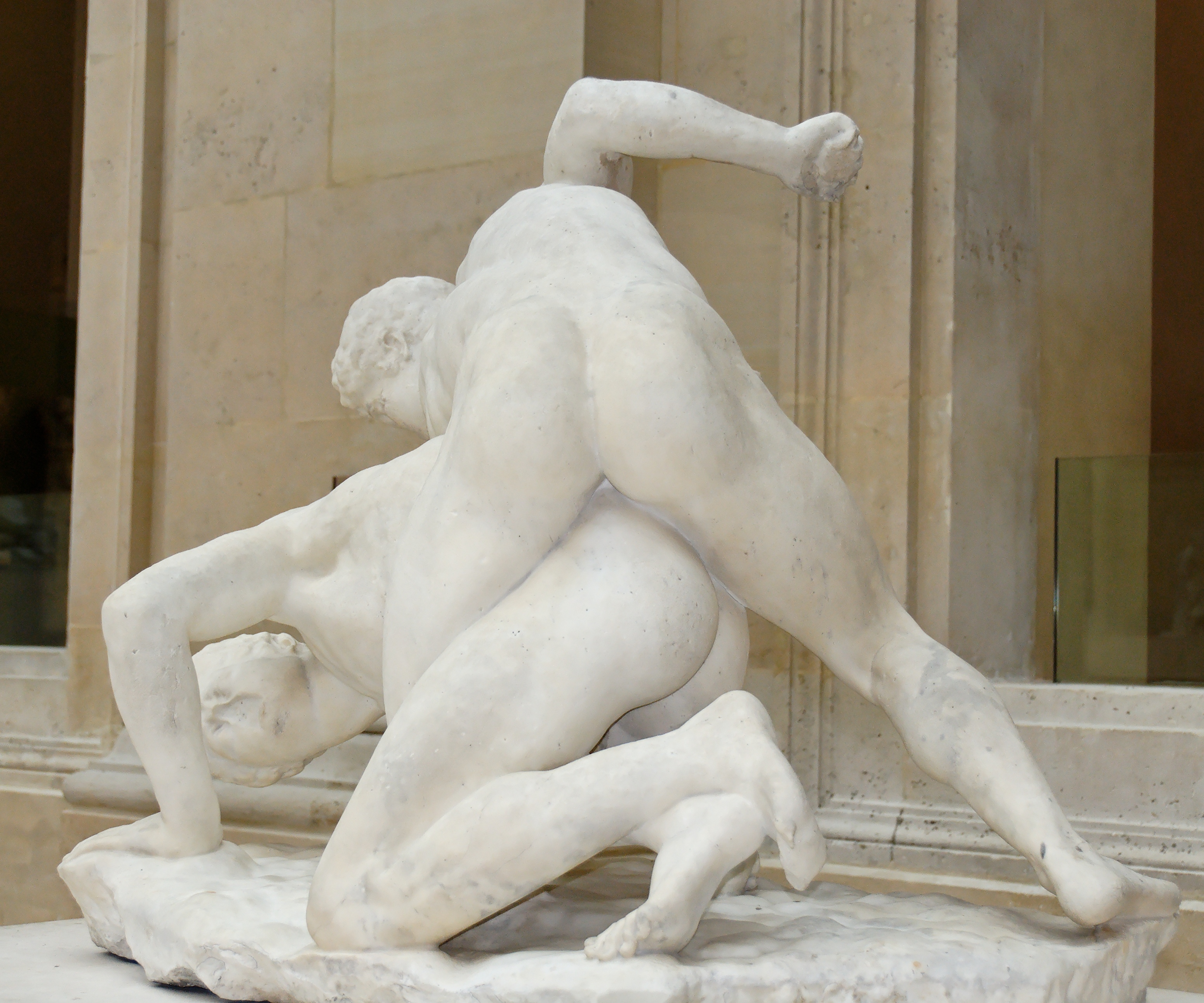

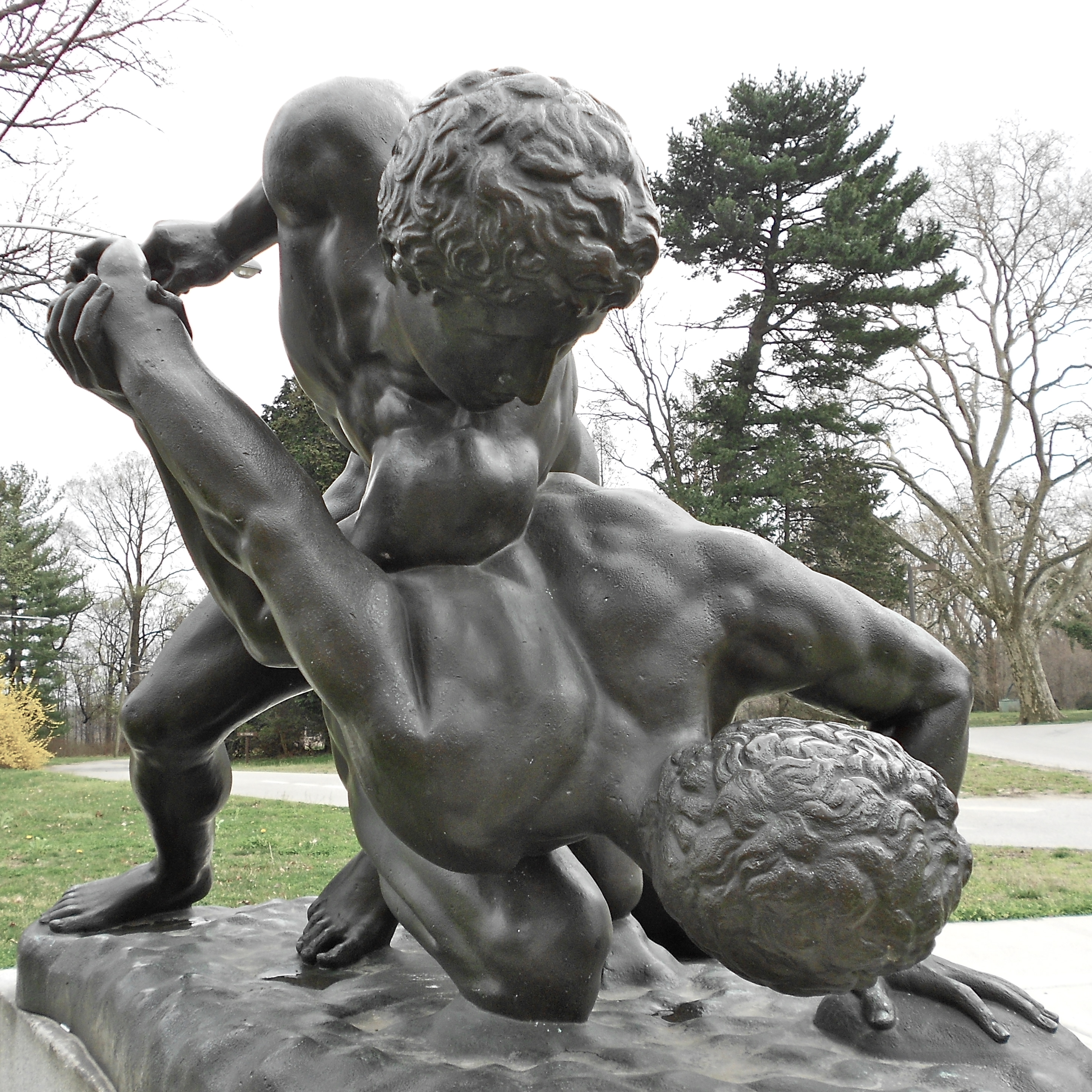
Wrestlers Hort Center

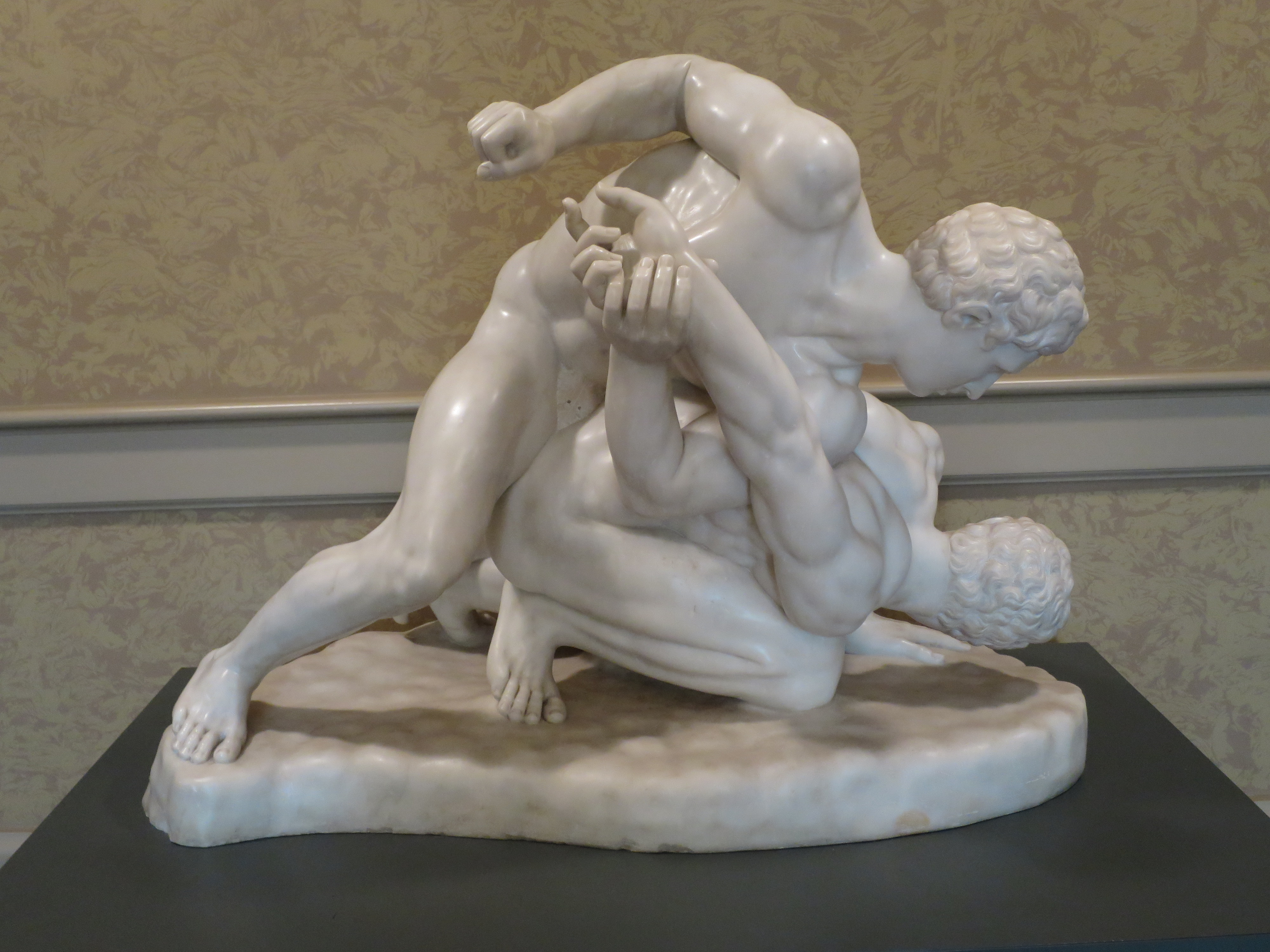
TOP LEFT: Marble copy in the (Uffizi Museum). TOP RIGHT: Philippe Magnier's somewhat weathered copy of c. 1684–1687, in the Louvre Museum BOTTOM RIGHT: Copy in the Uffizi Gallery collection, Hawaii Theatre. BOTTOM LEFT: A copy cast in 1885, displayed at the horticultural center in Fairmount Park, Philadelphia.

The Wrestlers (also known as The Two Wrestlers, The Uffizi Wrestlers or The Pancrastinae) is a Roman marble sculpture after a lost Greek original of the third century BCE. It is now in the Uffizi collection in Florence, Italy.

== Description, style and authorship ==
The two young men are engaged in the pankration, a kind of wrestling similar to the present-day sport of mixed martial arts. The two figures are wrestling in a position now known as a "cross-body ride" in modern folkstyle wrestling. The upper wrestler has his left leg entwined with his opponent's left leg, with his body across the opponent's body, lifting the opponent's right arm. In a well-known modern series of wrestling moves, the upper wrestler would now try to lift his opponent's arm above his head to force a pinning move called the "Guillotine." Their muscular structure is very defined due to their physical and sustained effort.

Neither of the two heads is original to the group, though that of the lower figure is older and is as advanced stylistically as the sons in the "Niobe Group". The heads were added after the sculpture was rediscovered.

The group is considered to be the finest quality Roman copy of a lost bronze original. Not every 20th-century viewer admired "a work once famous and now unfairly neglected", as art historian Kenneth Clark said of it: "If we can bring our eyes to rest on the unpleasant surface of a somewhat lifeless replica, we discover that the original must have been a Lysippic bronze of masterly complexity and condensation." The sculpture has been attributed variously to Myron, Cephisodotus the Younger or Heliodorus. The last two are mentioned by Pliny as creators of a sculptural format called symplegmata, signifying sculptures of figures closed in struggle, whether purely physical or amatory. Currently the sculpture is considered to be the best-quality Roman copy from a lost original Hellenistic bronze of the third century BCE, either of the Pergamene school or the circle of Lysippus.

== Rediscovery ==
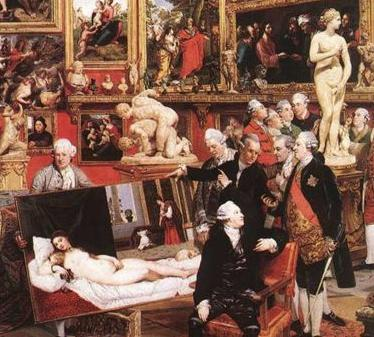
Detail from The Tribuna of the Uffizi (1722) by John Zoffany: The Wrestlers (centre) is surrounded by English and Italian connoisseurs at the Tribuna.

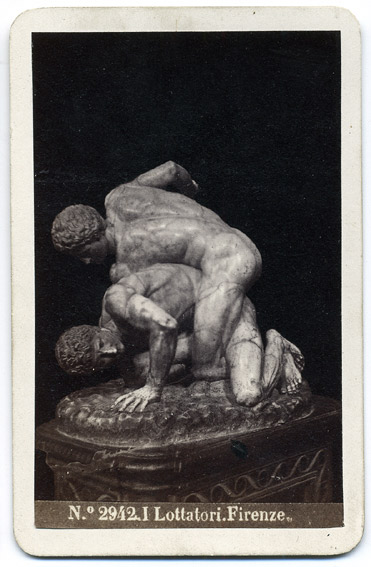
The Wrestlers before modern cleaning

The discovery of The Wrestlers caused such an immediate sensation among the cognoscenti of Rome, that the event can be dated to the very end of March or beginning of April 1583, in a vigna belonging to the Tommasini da Gallese family near Porta San Giovanni, Rome, together with the group of individual sculptures called the Niobids. Circumstances of their discovery, and the fact that the heads were missing, led early antiquarians—and the engravers who worked to their direction—to group the paired figures with these Niobids.

Within days of their excavation, Valerio Cioli, a sculptor and restorer of Roman antiquities in Rome, was writing to the secretary of Francesco I de' Medici, Grand Duke of Tuscany, to alert his patron to the discovery, and the Medici lost no time: on 25 June the group, and the Niobids were purchased from a member of the Varese family, who had managed to gain possession of them in the intervening weeks, by the Grand Duke's brother (and eventual heir) Ferdinando Cardinal de' Medici, who took it to add to the outstanding gallery of antiquities at Villa Medici. There it was illustrated in an engraving of 1594.

The Wrestlers is now among the Medici collections in the Galerie degli Uffizi. where it was a main feature of the Tribuna of the Uffizi.

The sculpture was cleaned of its former somewhat oily patina. The sculpture has been reproduced in marble, bronze and plaster, and in modern times cast in resin, both in full size and in miniature, and the subject in general was treated by Michelangelo. Philippe Magnier produced a marble copy of the group ca 1684–87 for the gardens of Versailles – it was later moved to Marly, and is now in the Louvre.
