= Parfums de Marly =

French Perfume Brand

- Industry: Niche Fragrances
- Founded: 2009
- Founder: Julien Sprecher
- Headquarters: Paris, France
- Products: Perfumes
- Website: Official website

Parfums de Marly is a French niche perfume house. Its fragrances are inspired by the 18th Century French era and the splendor of the Royal court. Presently, the brand offers over 30 fragrances.

== History ==
The house was established in 2009 by Julien Sprecher, who has had passion for history and perfumery since he was young. The name of the brand is inspired by "Château de Marly", residence of King Louis XV. The 18th Century was considered the golden age of perfumery, French King Louis XV, was famed for leading the "perfumed court". The King was also known for his love of racehorses. The brand logo bears the image of the ‘Chevaux de Marly’ created by Guillaume Coustou and the year of the restoration of the "Château de Marly" in 1743.
