= Nicolas Bertin =

French painter (1667–1736)

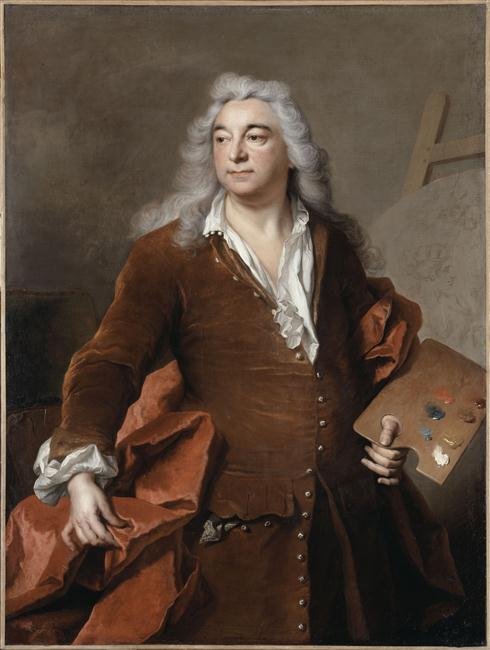
Jacques-François Delyen, Nicolas Bertin, 1725, oil on canvas; Palace of Versailles

Nicolas Bertin (1667 in Paris – 1736) was a French painter.

A student of Jean Jouvenet, Vernansal the elder and Louis Boullongne, he won the prix de Rome in 1685 for "Construction of Noah's ark". He was admitted to the Académie royale de peinture et de sculpture in 1703.

== Works ==
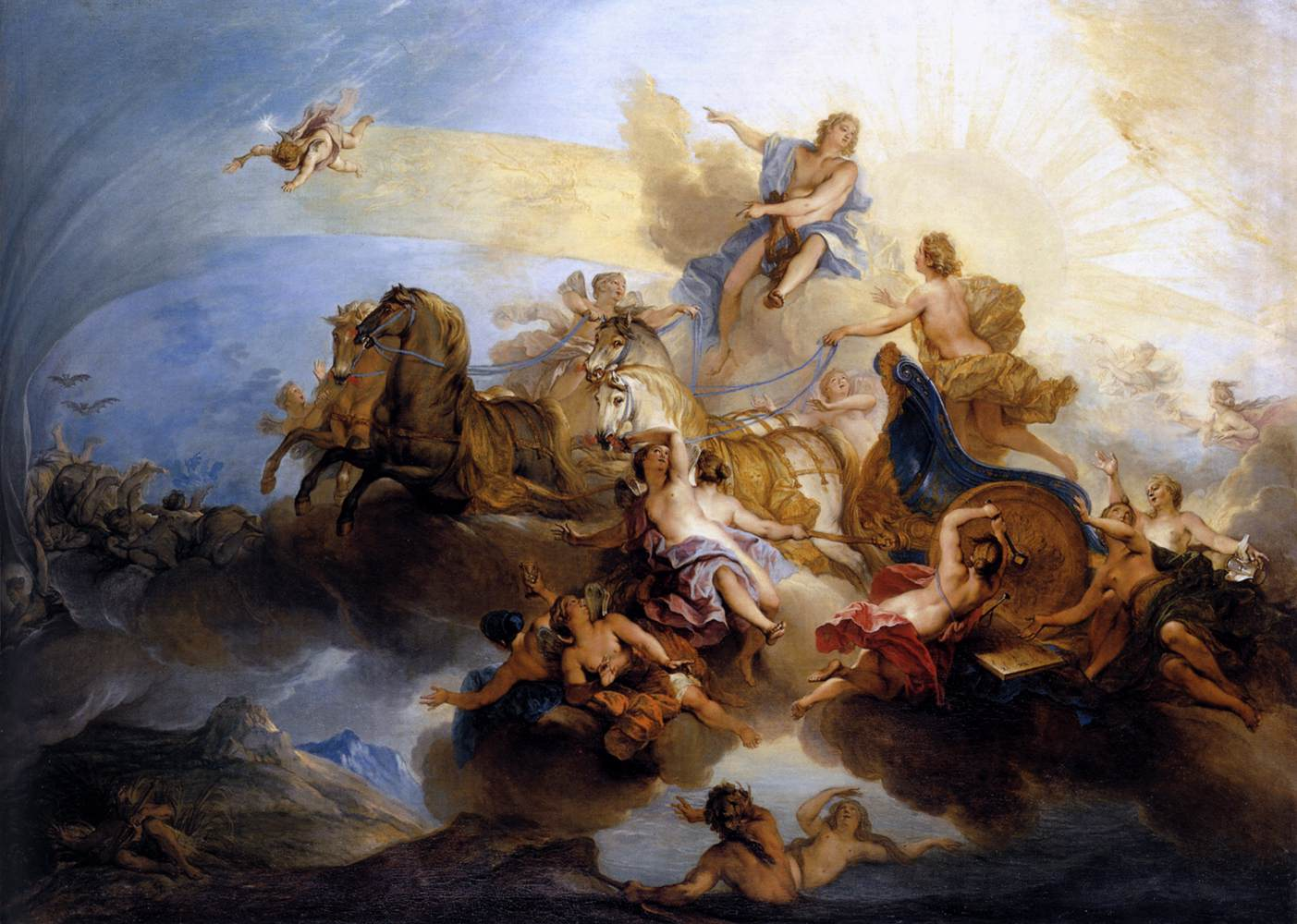
Phaeton driving the sun-chariot Phaéton on the Chariot of Apollo, c. 1720

- Saint Philip baptising the eunuch of Kandake, 1718 (Louvre)
- Hercules delivering Prometheus.
- Construction of Noah's ark, 1685
- The Stoning of St Stephen, (Musée Henri Dupuis Saint-Omer)
- Moses and the daughters of Jethro, (Musée Henri Dupuis Saint-Omer)
- Moses and the daughters of Jethro, (Musée Lambinet Versailles) (2iem version)
- Prometheus delivered by Hercules, 1703, (Louvre)
- Bacchanalia, 1710–1720, (National Museum in Warsaw)
- The Resurrection of Lazarus, 1720 (Musée Lambinet Versailles)
- Phaeton driving the sun-chariot (Phaéton on the Chariot of Apollo), c. 1720, (Louvre)
- Vertumnus and Pomona, (decoration) (musée national du château et des Trianons Versailles)
- Annunciation (Loyola University Museum of Art, Chicago)

== Sources ==
- Lee, Simon (2003). "Bertin, Nicolas". Grove Art Online.
