= Philippe Magnier =

French sculptor

Philippe Magnier was a French sculptor (1647–1715) in the service of the Louis XIV's court painter Charles Le Brun.

== Life ==
He was born in Paris to Laurent Magnier. He worked for Le Brun at a time when many works of art were required for the new, enormous Versailles castle complex. He died in Paris.

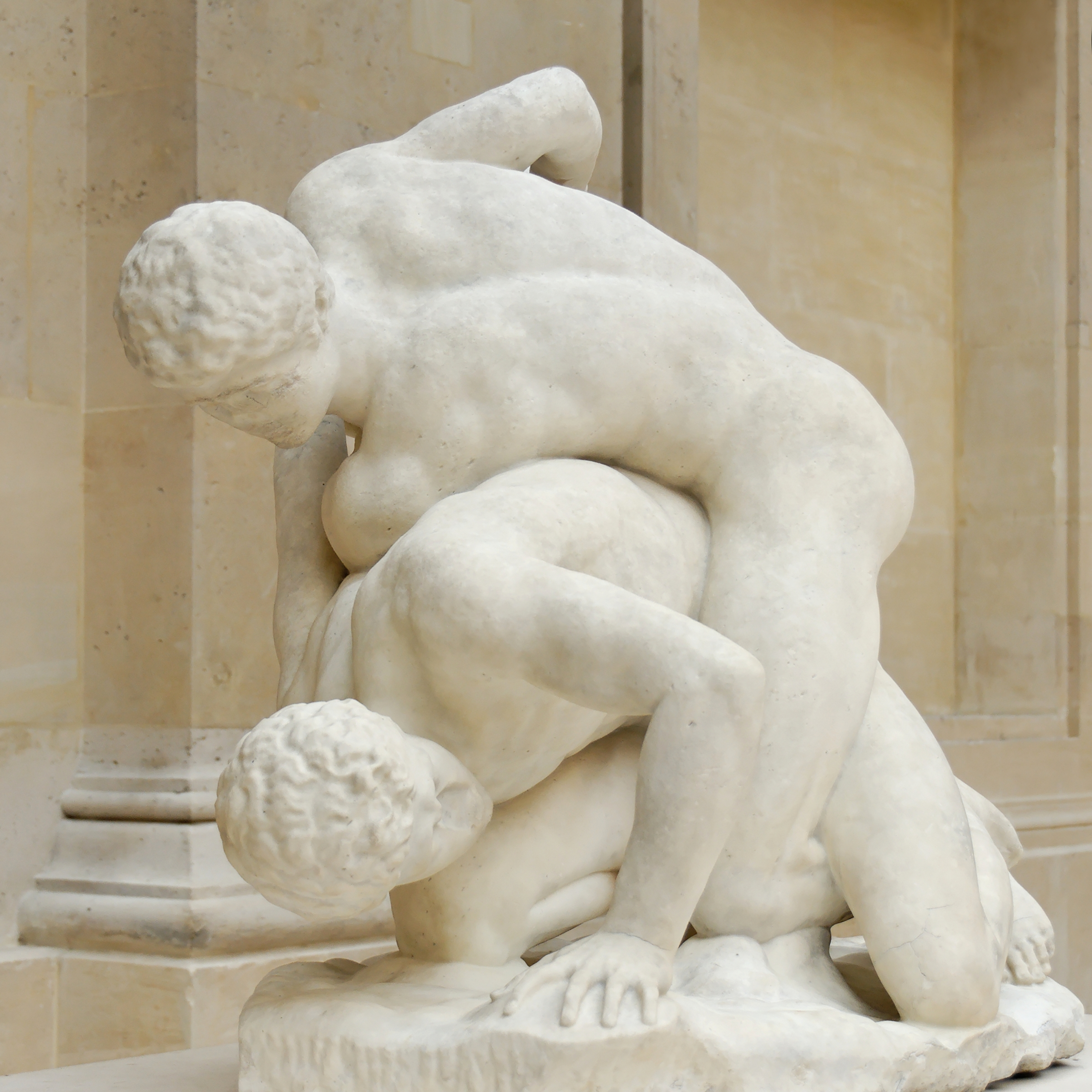
Philippe Magnier, Lutteurs, The Louvre, 1684-88

== Works ==
- Les Lutteurs ('the Wrestlers'), a 1684–1685 copy of the classical Uffizi wrestlers, made for Versailles park (now in the Louvre museum)
- L'Aurore 'Dawn' (Louvre)
- Saint Jude (Louvre)
- Nymphe (park of Versailles castle)
- L'aurore (park of Versailles)
- Le Printemps 'Spring' (park of Versailles)
- Ulysse 'Ulysses' (park of Versailles)
