= Laurent Magnier =

French sculptor

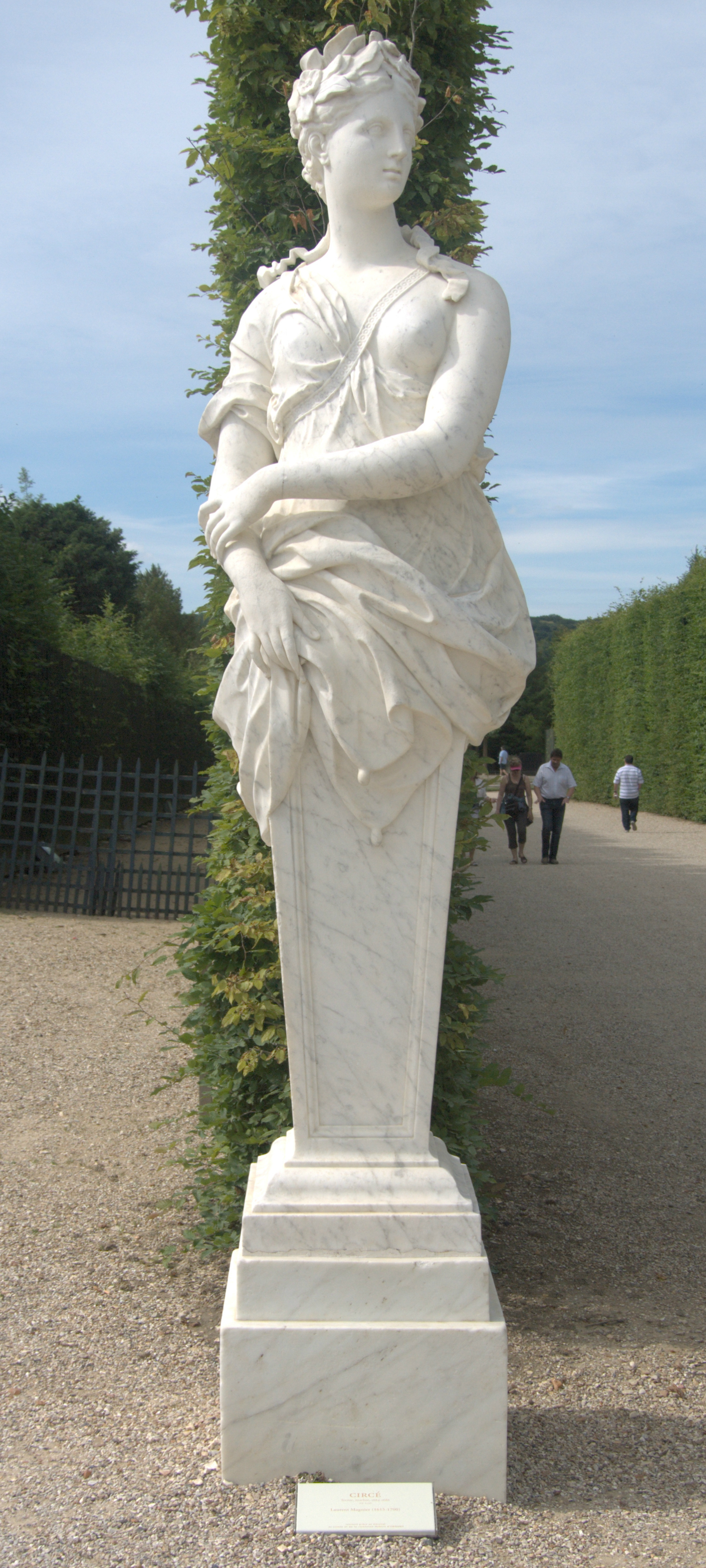
Circé (c. 1685), now in the park at the Palace of Versailles, France.

Laurent Magnier (1618–1700) was a French sculptor.

== Life ==
He was born and died in Paris.

His son was Philippe Magnier, who was also a sculptor.
