= Musée des Beaux-Arts de Nîmes =

Fine arts museum in Nîmes, France

Coordinates: 43.8319°N 4.3606°E

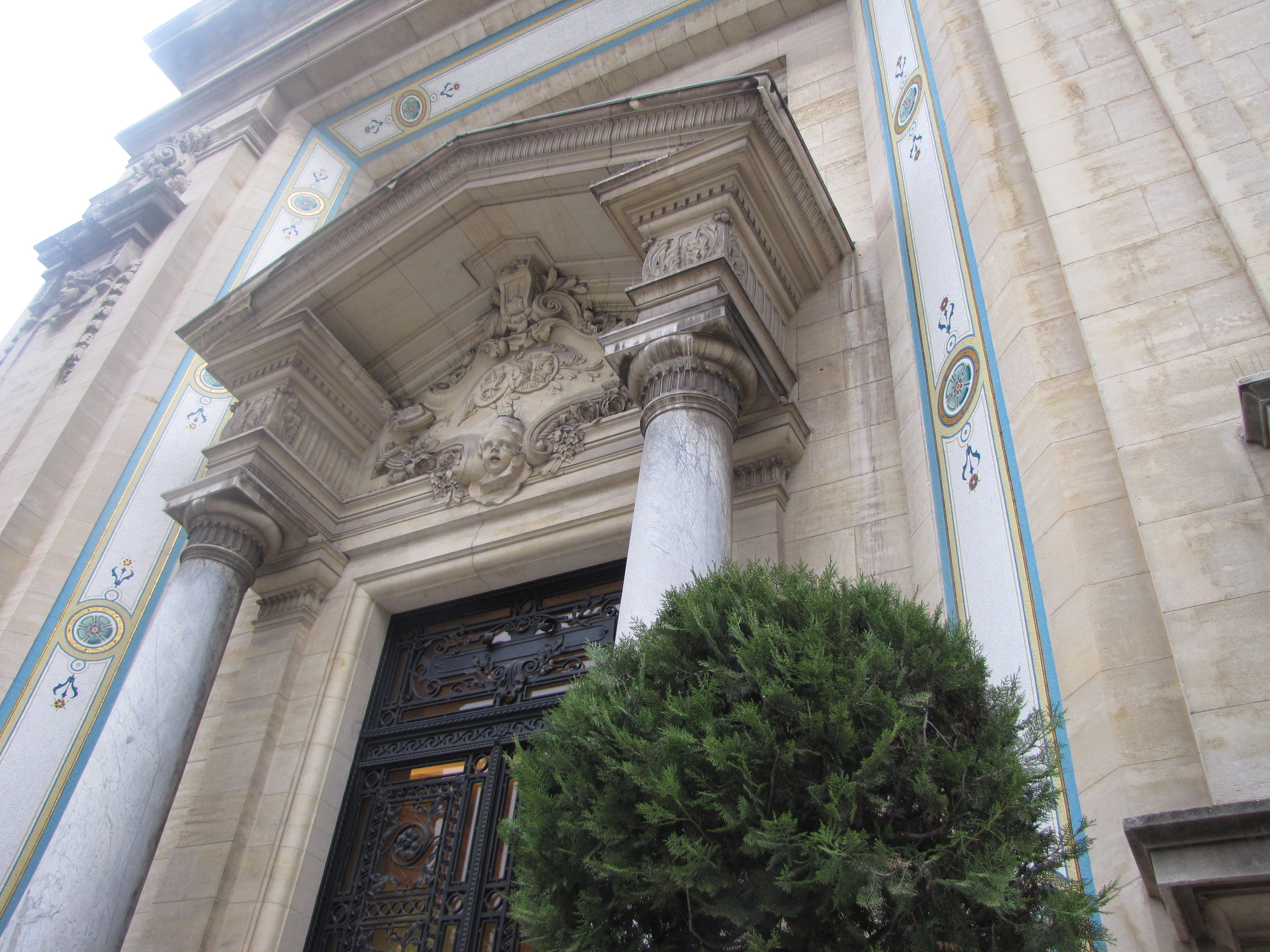
Entrance

The Musée des Beaux-Arts de Nîmes (French pronunciation: [myze de boz‿aʁ də nim]) is the fine arts museum of Nîmes, in southern France.

== Site ==
It was founded in 1821 and originally housed in the Maison Carrée. Since 1907 it has been housed in a building designed by the architect Max Raphel in the Square de la Mandragore on the rue de la Cité Foulc. The Maison Carrée soon became too small and an architectural competition was organised in 1902 for a new building. This was won by Max Raphel and work began in 1903, being completed in 1907. It was renovated by the architect Jean-Michel Wilmotte in 1987.

== Collections ==
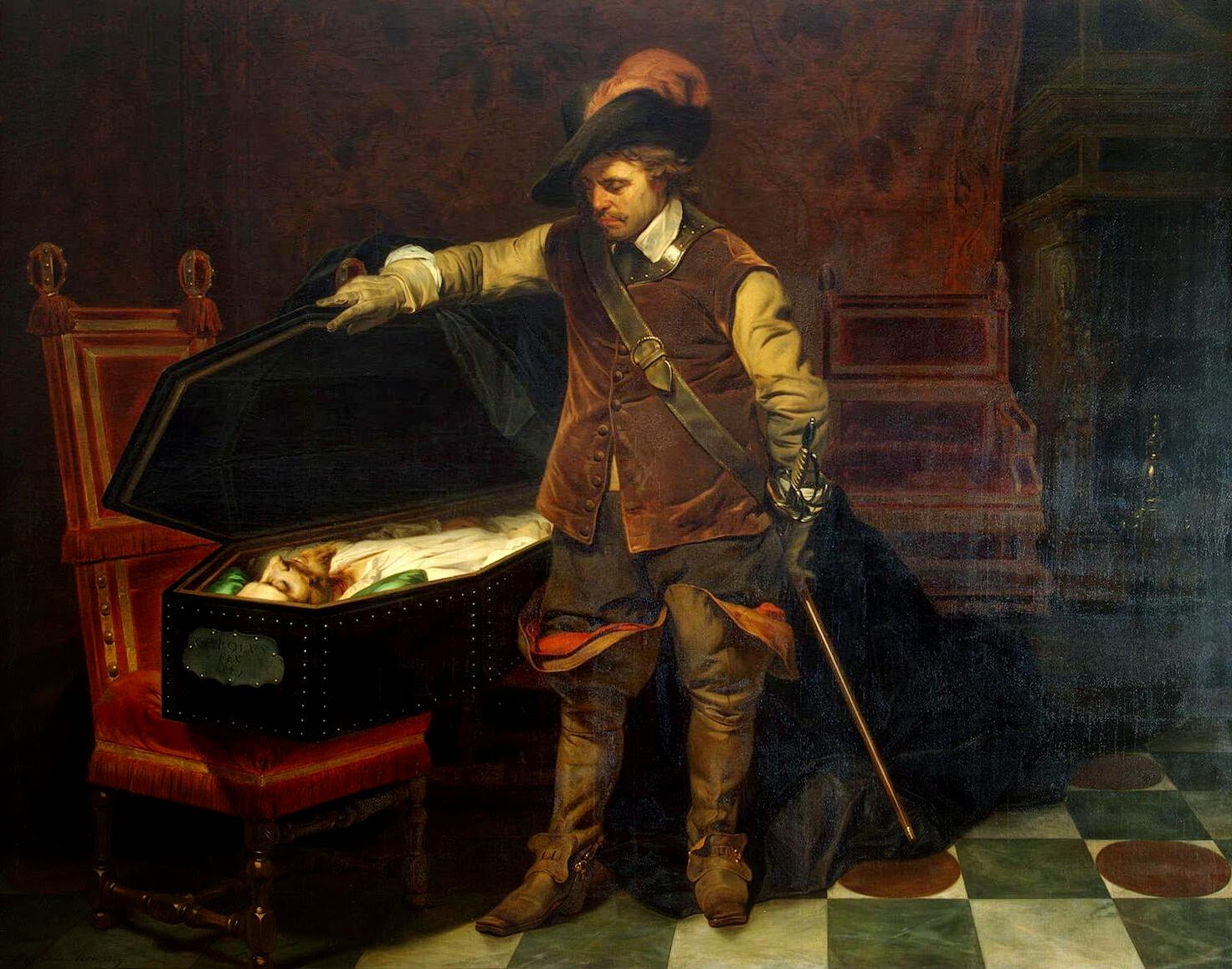
Paul Delaroche, Oliver Cromwell with the corpse of Charles I

The original collection was gathered from private collections in 1824 and was mainly made up of Roman antiquities, old master paintings and modern paintings. It was later enriched by legacies such as those of Robert Gower in 1869 and of Charles Tur in 1948 and gifts by professional and amateur artists. The collection now includes 3,600 works. In a lower 3-room gallery are Italian paintings by Jacopo Bassano (1515–1592), Lelio Orsi (1511–1587) and Andrea della Robbia (1435–1525) among others. In the seven rooms of the upper gallery are Flemish and Dutch paintings of the 16th and 17th centuries (Rubens, Carel Fabritius, Pieter Coecke van Aelst (1502–1550), Leonaert Bramer) and French paintings by Renaud Levieux, Jean-François de Troy, Pierre Subleyras and Paul Delaroche's Oliver Cromwell with the corpse of Charles I. They also house paintings by the Nîmes-born artists Charles-Joseph Natoire and Xavier Sigalon.
