= Guillaume Coustou the Elder =

French sculptor (1677–1746)

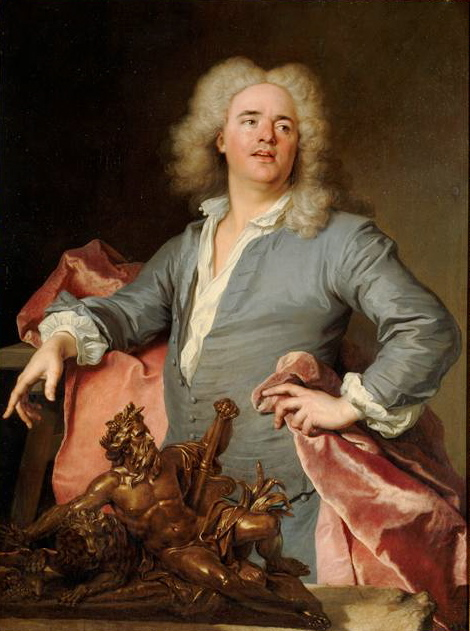
- Guillaume Coustou the Elder by Jacques-François Delyen, in the Palace of Versailles, Salle Louis XIV
- Born: 29 November 1677; Lyon, the Lyonnais, Kingdom of France
- Died: 22 February 1746 (aged 68); Paris, Kingdom of France
- Known for: Sculpture
- Movement: Baroque and Louis XIV style
- Children: Guillaume Coustou
- Parents: François Coustou (father); Claudine Coysevox (mother)
- Relatives: Nicolas Coustou (brother), Antoine Coysevox (uncle)

Director of the Académie de Peinture et de Sculpture
- In office 1733–1735 (Note: The directorship of the Académie was shared until February 1735 between Coustou and the three other rectors: Hyacinthe Rigaud, Claude-Guy Hallé, and Nicolas de Largillière)
- Monarch: Louis XV
- Preceded by: Louis de Boullogne
- In office 1735–1738
- Succeeded by: Nicolas de Largillière

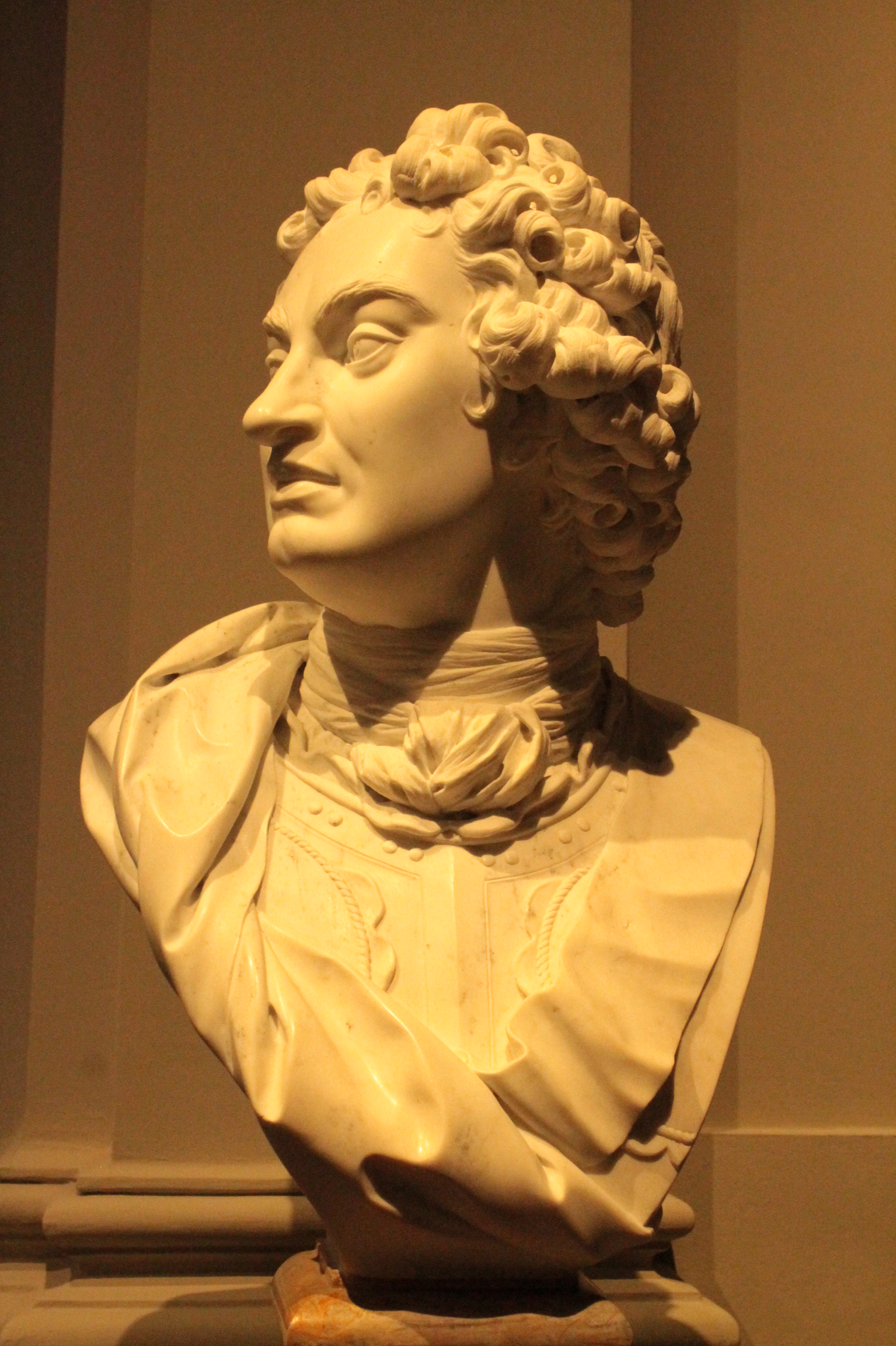
August the Strong of Saxony by Guillaume Coustou the Elder, c.1725, Museum of Old Masters, Dresden

Guillaume Coustou the Elder (French pronunciation: [ɡijom kustu]; 29 November 1677, Lyon – 22 February 1746, Paris) was a French sculptor of the Baroque and Louis XIV style. He was a royal sculptor for Louis XIV and Louis XV and became Director of the Royal Academy of Painting and Sculpture in 1735. He is best known for his monumental statues of horses made for the Château de Marly, whose replicas now stand in the Place de la Concorde in Paris.

== Life ==
Coustou was a member of a family of famous sculptors; his uncle, Antoine Coysevox, was a royal sculptor; his elder brother, Nicolas Coustou was a sculptor, and his son Guillaume Coustou the Younger also become a noted royal sculptor. Like his older brother, he won the (Prix de Rome) of the Royal Academy which entitled him to study for four years at the French Academy in Rome. However, he refused to accept the discipline of the academy, gave up his studies, set out to make his own career as an artist. He worked for a time in the atelier of the painter Pierre Legros, and eventually returned to Paris.

Upon his return to Paris, he assisted his uncle Coysevox in making two monumental equestrian sculptures, Fame and Mercury, for the Château de Marly, the new residence of Louis XIV near the Palace of Versailles, where he went to escape the crowds and ceremony of the palace. He later (1740–1745), made his own horses, the Marly Horses, his most famous works, to replace them. The horses reinvent the theme of the colossal Roman marbles of the Horse Tamers in the Piazza Quirinale, Rome. They were commissioned by Louis XV in 1739 and installed in 1745 at the Abreuvoir ("Horse Trough") at Marly. The horses were considered masterpieces of the grace and expressiveness of the French Late Baroque or Rococo style. After the Revolution they were moved from Marly to the beginning of the Champs-Élysées on the Place de la Concorde. The originals were brought indoors for protection at the Louvre Museum in 1984.

Coustou was received into the Académie royale de peinture et de sculpture in 1704. The work he made to mark his entrance was Hercules on the Pyre, now in the Louvre. It displays the special hallmark of the Baroque, a twisting and rising transverse pose, as well as highly skillful carving.

Following the death of directeur Louis de Boullogne on 28 November 1733, the painter Hyacinthe Rigaud proposed that the four rectors of the Académie, Coustou, Claude-Guy Hallé, Nicolas de Largillière, and himself, rotate the post. This oligarchy would persist until the election of Coustou as sole director on 5 February 1735.

Coustou also created two colossal monuments, The Ocean and the Mediterranean among other sculptures for the park at Marly; the bronze Rhone, which formed part of the statue of Louis XIV at Lyons, and the sculptures at the entrance of the Hôtel des Invalides. Of these latter, the bas-relief representing Louis XIV mounted and accompanied by Justice and Prudence was destroyed during the Revolution, but was restored in 1815 by Pierre Cartellier from Coustou's model; the bronze figures of Mars and Minerva (1733–34), on either side of the doorway, were not interfered with.

In 1714 for Marly he collaborated in two marble sculptures representing Apollo Chasing Daphne (both at the Louvre), in which Nicolas Coustou sculpted the Apollo and Guillaume the Daphne. About the same time he was commissioned to produce another running figure in marble, a Hippomenes designed to complement an Atalanta copied from the Antique by Pierre Lepautre: each was placed at the center of one of the carp pools at Marly.

In 1725, the Louis Antoine de Pardaillan de Gondrin, Duke of Antin, general director of the Bâtiments du Roi, commissioned a pair of life-size marbles of Louis XV as Jupiter and Marie Leszczyńska as Juno for the park of his Château de Petit-Bourg, which adjoined the park of Versailles, to which it was added after the Duke's death.

A number of his sculptures were for the Tuileries Gardens, most notably a bronze Diane à la biche ("Diana and a Deer"), and Hippoméne (1714), which was originally in the goldfish pond at Marly, then moved to the Tuileries until 1940, when it was brought into the Louvre.

Coustou's marble Bust of Samuel Bernard is at the Metropolitan Museum of Art, Guillaume often worked with his brother Nicolas Coustou, particularly in the decoration of royal domestic architecture at Versailles.

== Sculpture ==
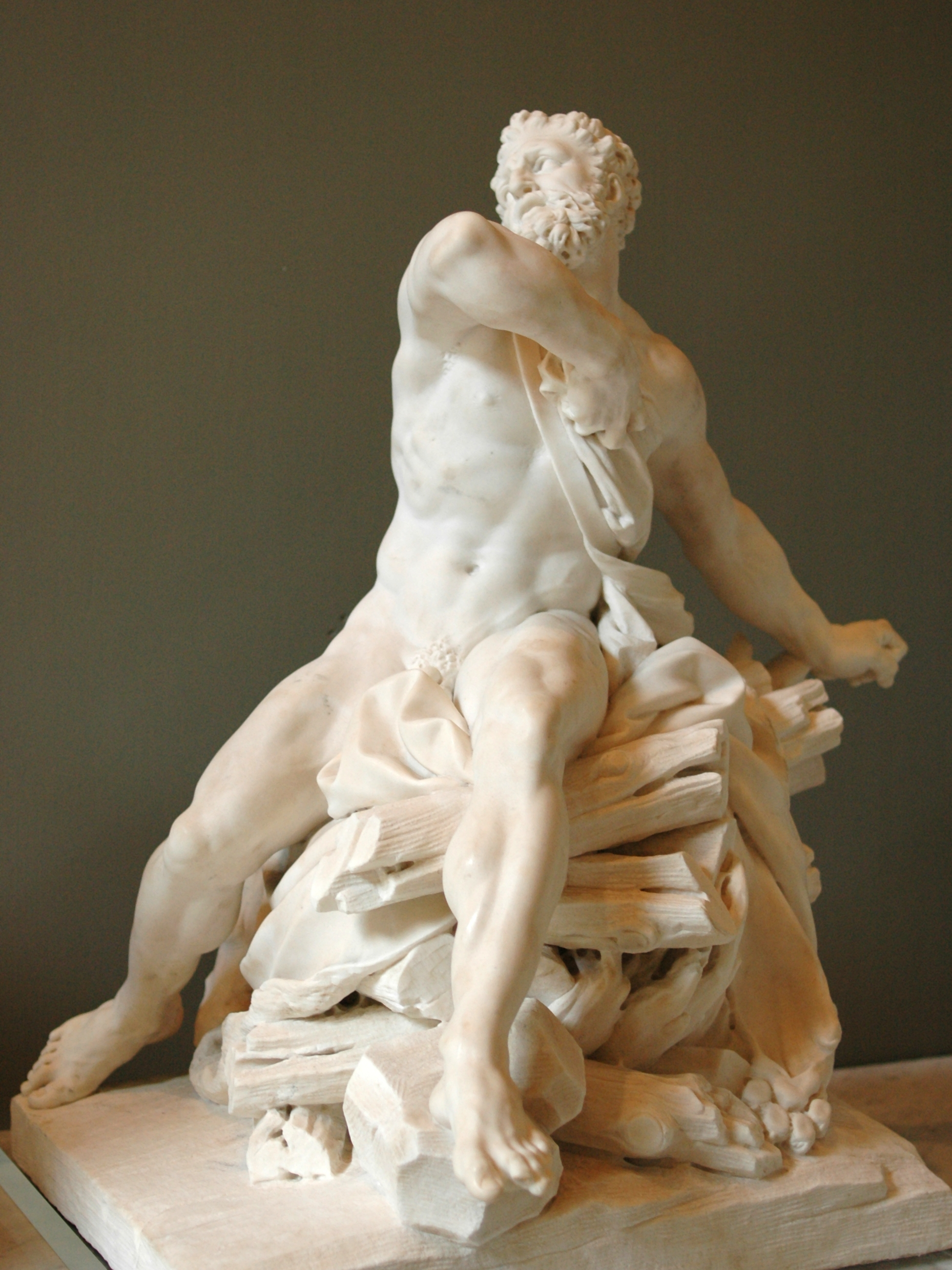
Hercules on the pyre, (1704), Louvre

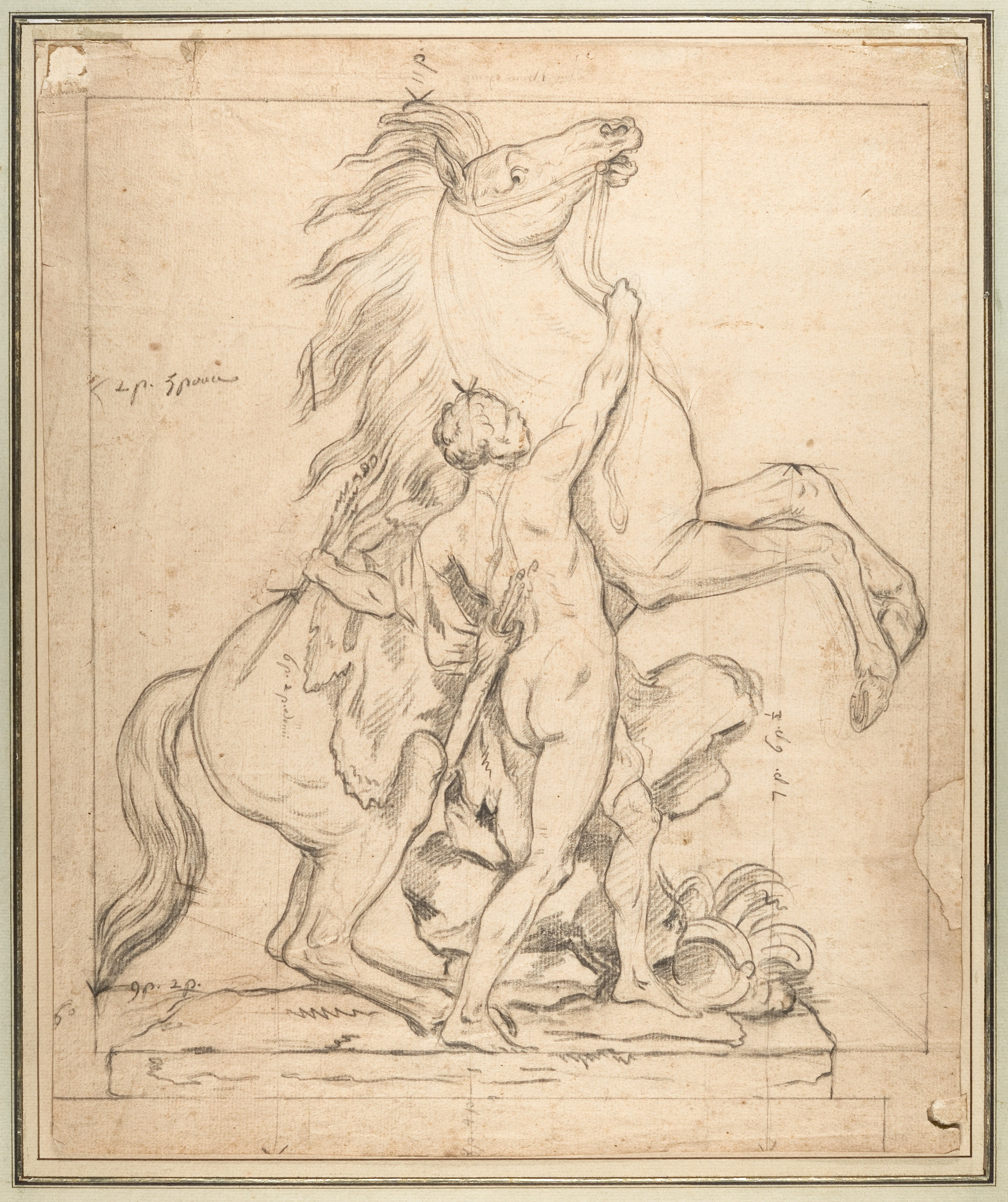
Study for one of the horses of Marly, Metropolitan Museum of Art

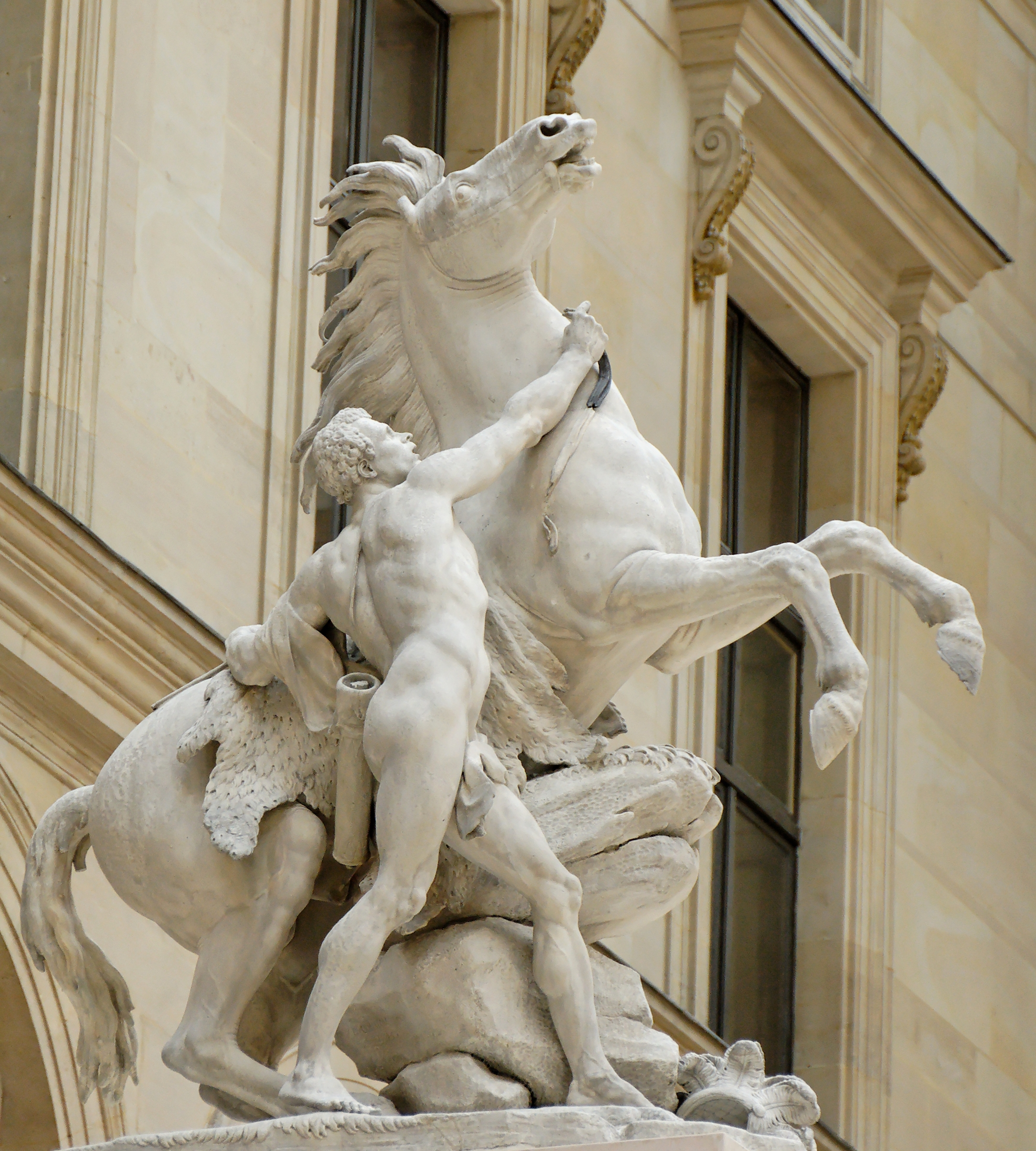
One of the Marly Horses

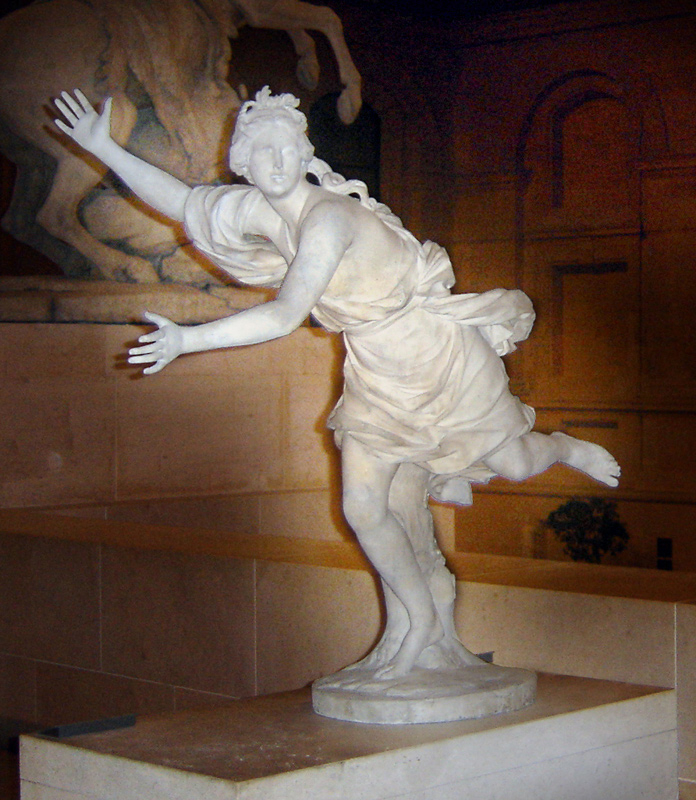
Daphne chased by Apollo, Louvre

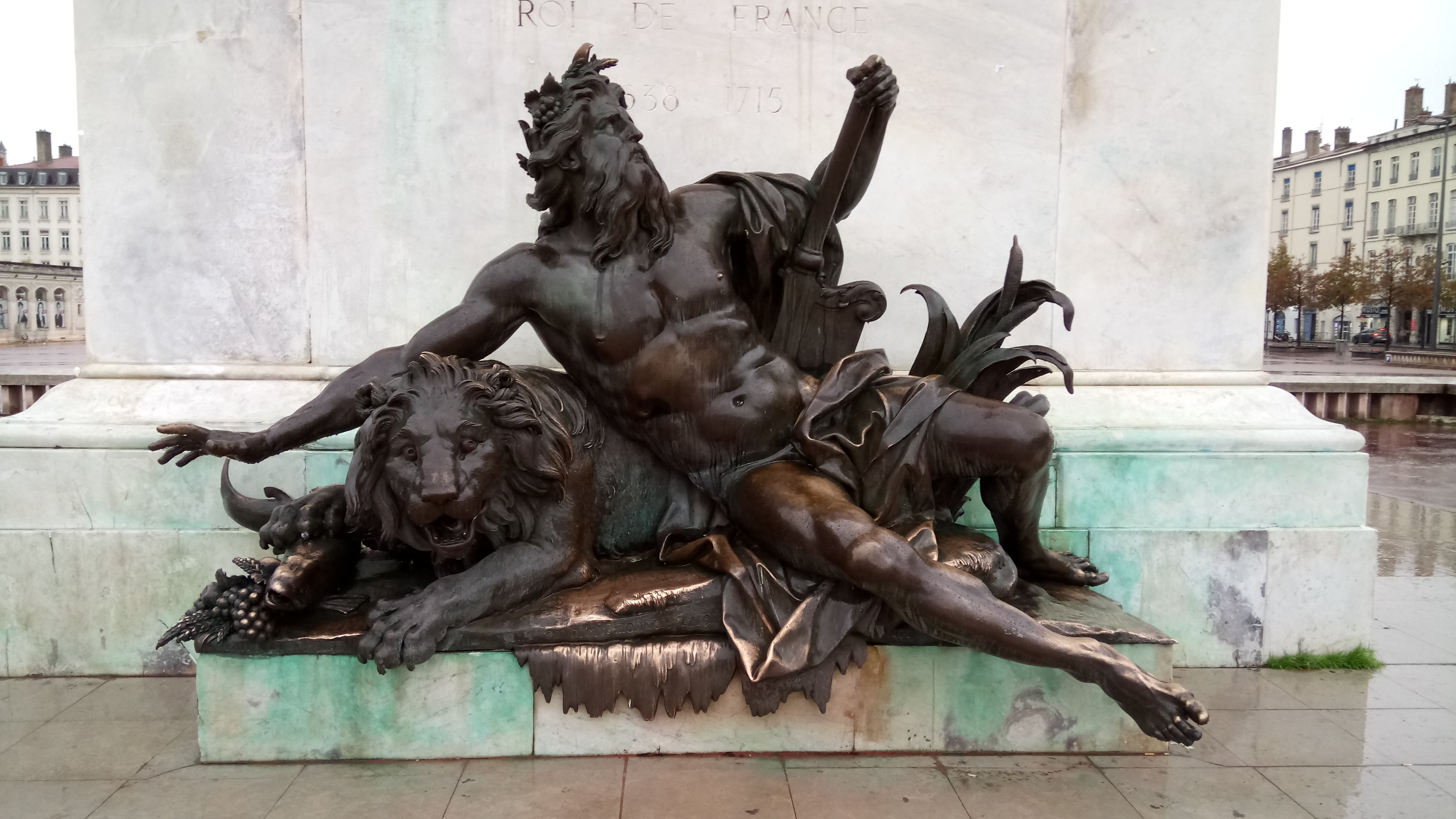
Allegory of the Rhone River, Lyon

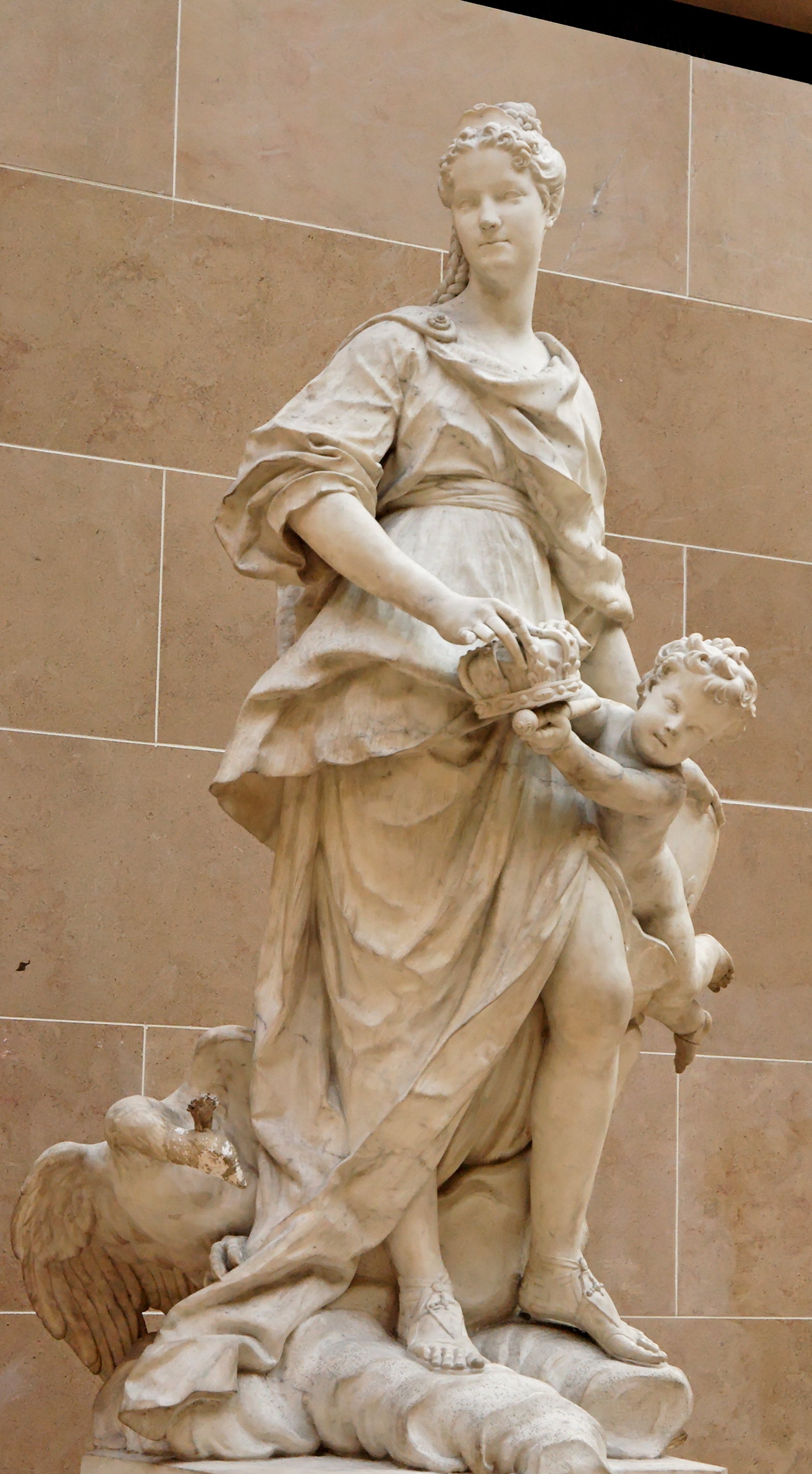
Marie Leszczyńska, Louvre

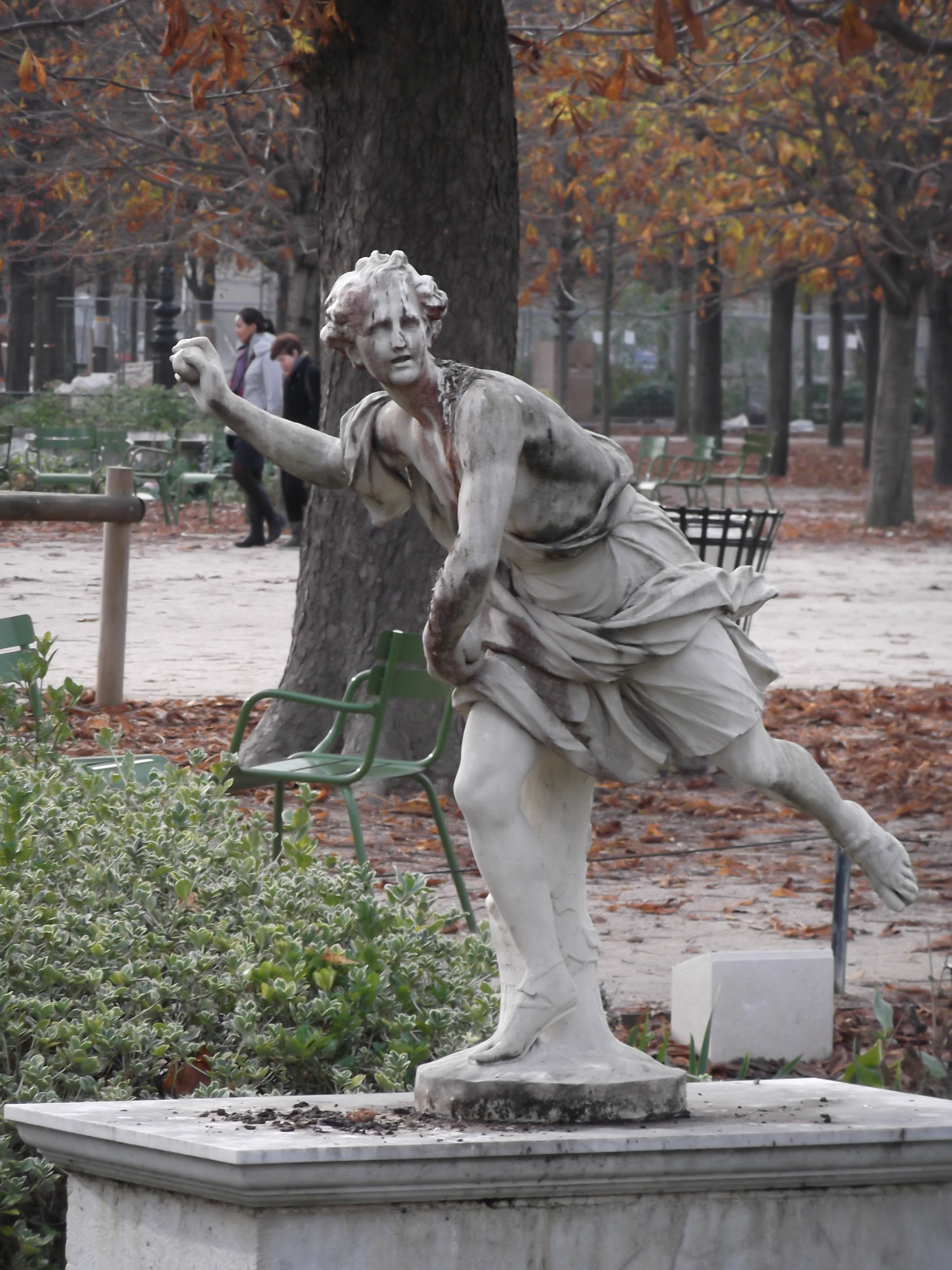
Hippomène, Tuileries Garden

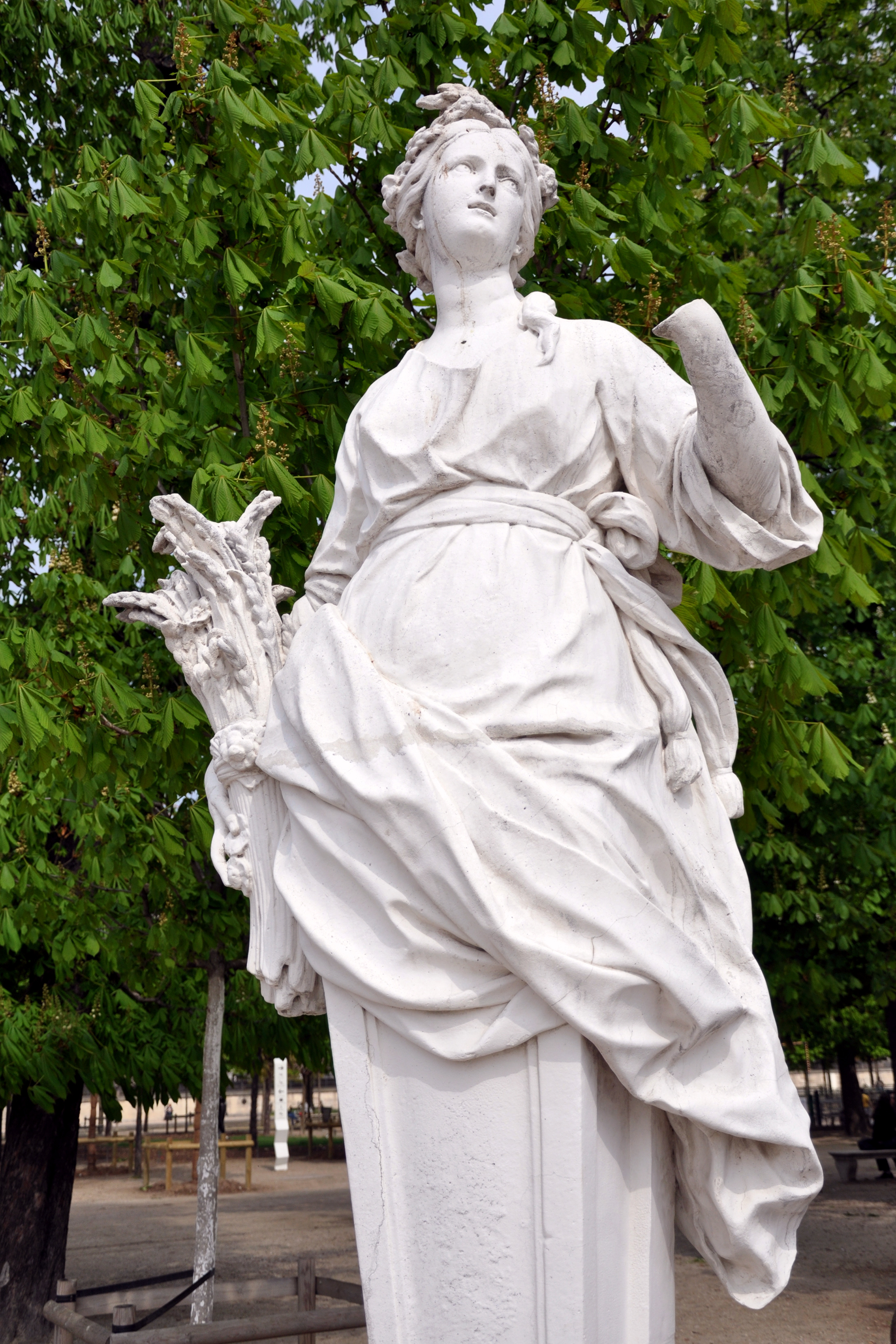
Summer from The Four Seasons, originally at Marly, now in Tuileries Garden

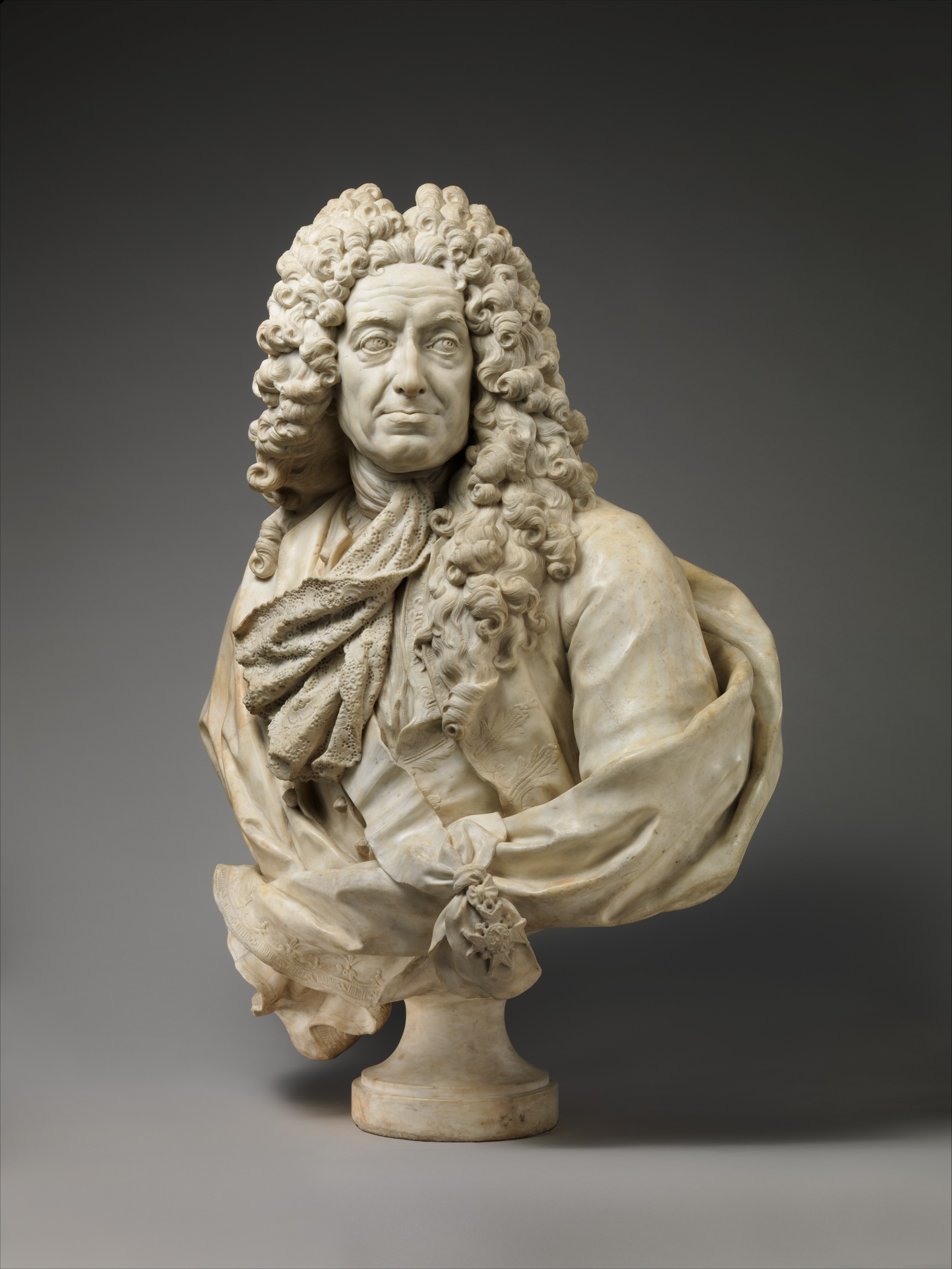
Bust of Samuel Bernard

== Bibliography ==
- Geese, Uwe (2007). "Baroque sculpture in Italy, France and Central Europe". In Tolman, Rolf (ed.). Baroque: Architecture - Sculpture - Painting. Cologne: H.F. Ulmann. ISBN 978-3-8331-4675-6.
- Le Petit Robert des Noms Propres, Paris (2010), (ISBN 978-2-84902-740-0)
- Louvre website: Guillaume I Coustou, Hippomène
