= Château de Marly =

French royal residence

Coordinates: 48°51′50″N 2°06′00″E

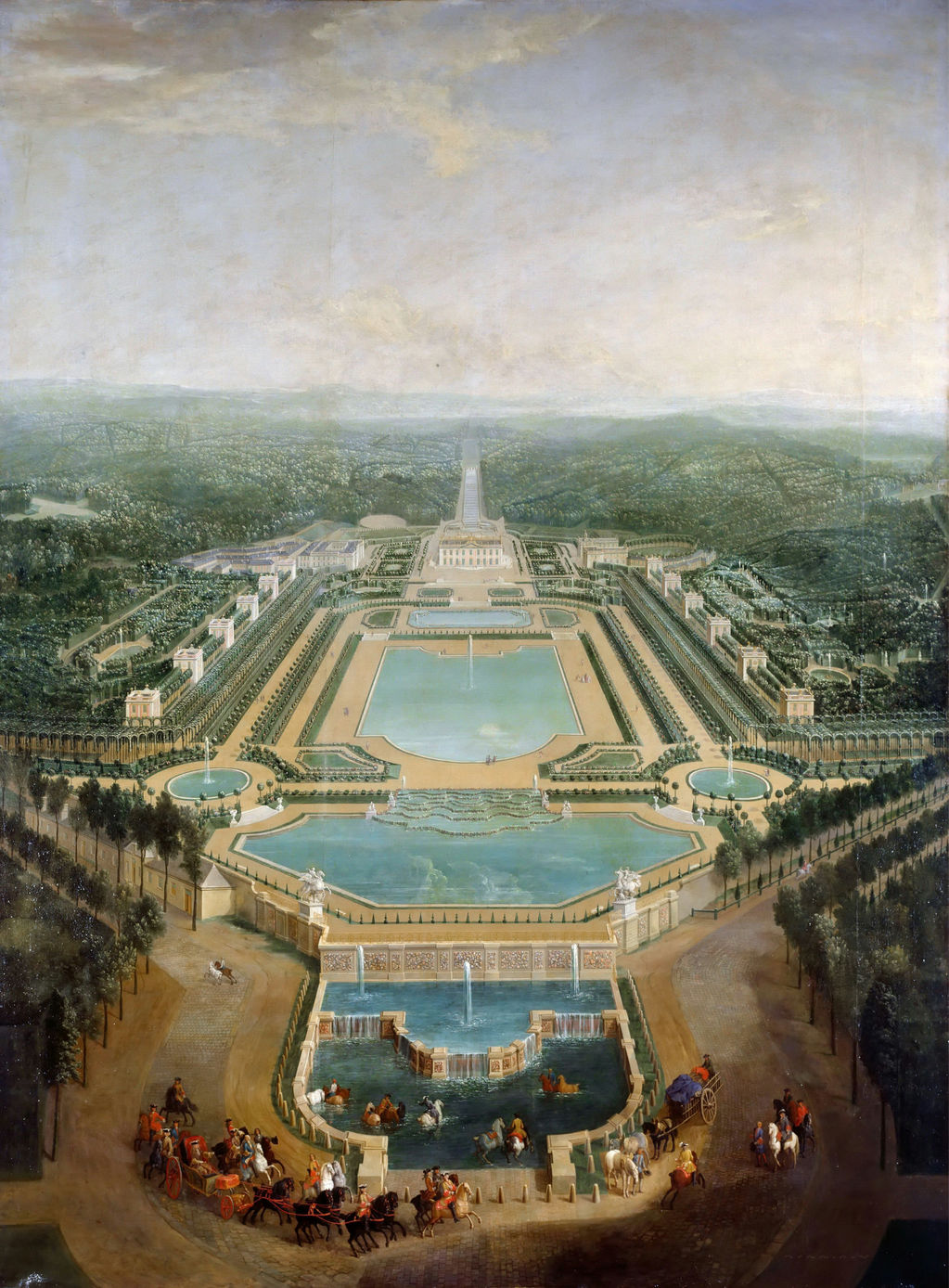
The Château de Marly painted by Pierre-Denis Martin in 1724.

The Château de Marly (French pronunciation: [ʃato də maʁli]) was a French royal residence located in what is now Marly-le-Roi, the commune on the northern edge of the royal park. This was situated west of the palace and garden complex at Versailles. Marly-le-Roi is the town that developed to serve the château, which was demolished in 1806 after passing into private ownership and being used as a factory. The town is now a bedroom community for Paris.

At the Château of Marly, Louis XIV escaped from the formal rigors he was constructing at Versailles. Small rooms meant less company, and simplified protocol; courtiers, who fought among themselves for invitations to Marly, were housed in a revolutionary design of twelve pavilions built in matching pairs flanking the central sheets of water, which were fed one from the other by formalized cascades (illustration, right).

After the French Revolution, about 1800, the château was sold to a private owner. He demolished it in 1806 after his factory there failed. The hydraulic "machine" that pumped water for Versailles was also demolished. Only the foundation of Jules Hardouin-Mansart's small château the pavillon du Roi remains at the top of the slope in Marly park. Napoleon bought back the estate in 1807, and the park belongs to the state.

The French niche perfume house Parfums de Marly was named after Château de Marly.

== History ==
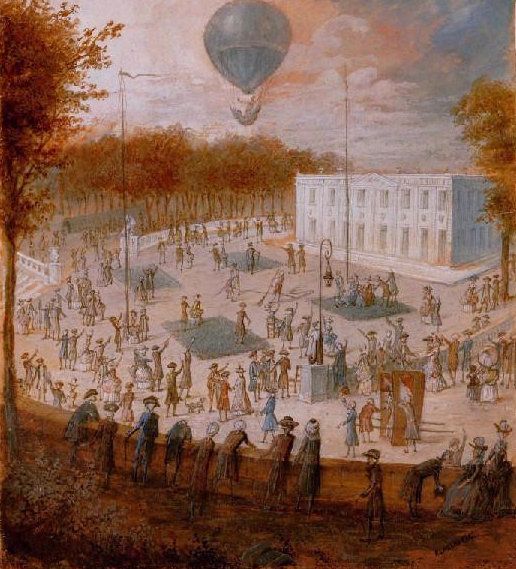
Life at the château c.1780s.

The works at Marly were begun in the spring of 1679, on 22 May, before Louis had moved his court permanently to Versailles. The king was looking for a retreat on well-wooded royal lands between Versailles and Saint-Germain-en-Laye that were well-watered and provided a grand view. Marly was chosen.

Robert Berger has demonstrated that the design of Marly was a full collaboration between Jules Hardouin-Mansart and the Premier peintre du Roi Charles Le Brun, who were concurrently working on the Hall of Mirrors at Versailles. Mansart's elevations for the pavilions were to be frescoed to designs adapted from a suite that Le Brun had recently drawn. The frescoed exteriors of the otherwise somewhat severe buildings created a richly Baroque ensemble of feigned sculptures against draperies and hangings, with vases on feigned sculptural therms against the piers— all in the somewhat eclectic Olympian symbolism that Le Brun and the King favoured everywhere at Versailles.

The decor of the pavillon du Roi featured Apollo, the Sun King's iconographic persona, and Thetis. Other pavilions were dedicated to other Olympians, but also to Hercules, and to Victory, Fame and Abundance. Construction was completed by 1684, though the overcharged painted programmes were simplified and restrained in the execution.

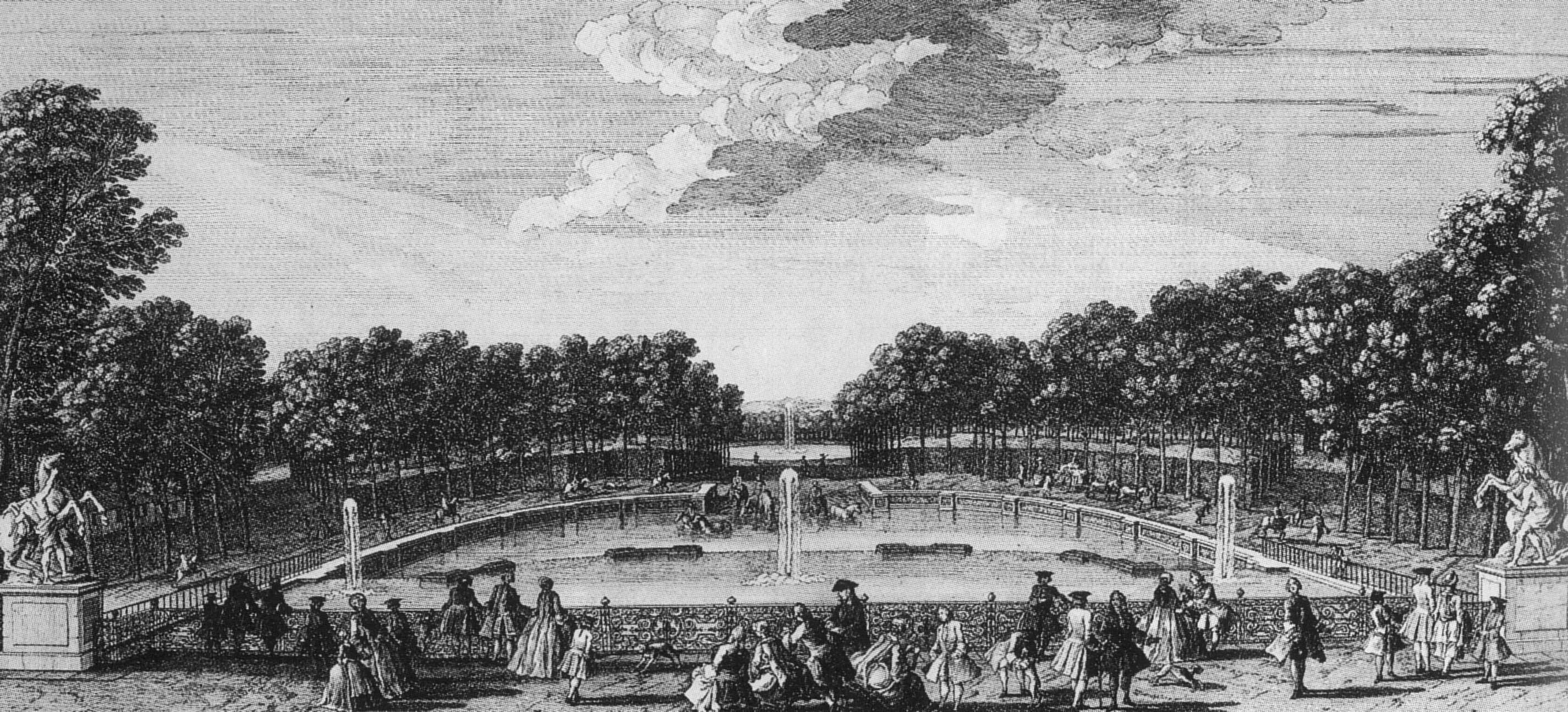
The horse watering pool at the Château de Marly.

The Sun King attended the opening of the completed hydraulic works in June 1684 and by 1686 development was sufficiently advanced for the King to stay there for the first time, with a selected entourage. The theme of Marly was that it was a simple hunting lodge, just enough to accommodate the Royal Hunt. In 1688 the Grand Abreuvoir à chevaux was installed on the terrace, a mere "horse trough."

Throughout the rest of his life, Louis continued to embellish the wooded park, with wide straight rides, in which ladies or the infirm might follow the hunt, at some distance, in a carriage, and with more profligate waterworks than waterless Versailles could provide: the Rivière or Grande Cascade dates to 1697–1698. Versailles was provided with water from Marly.

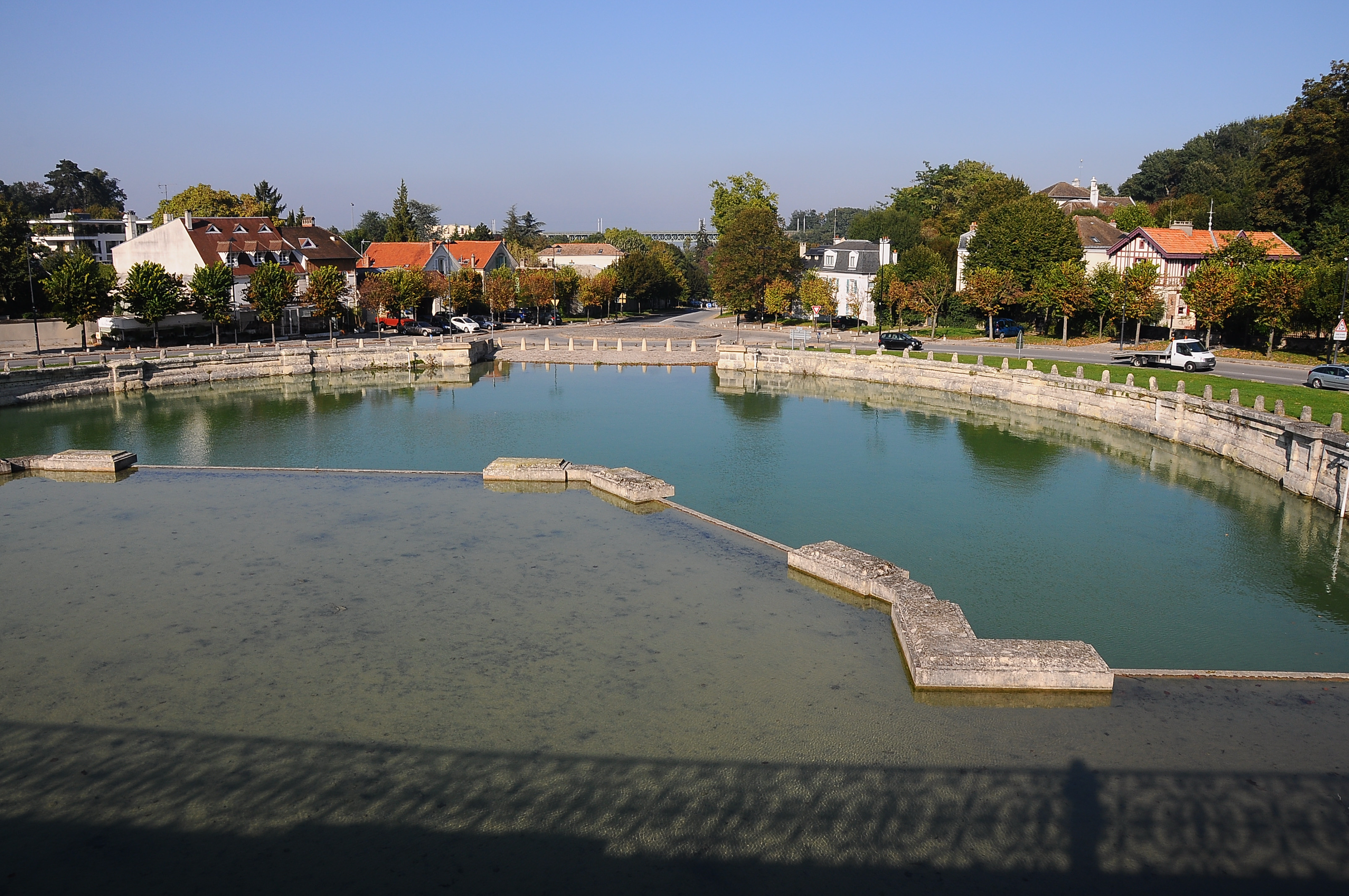
The horse-watering pool of the former château royal de Marly, in Marly-le-Roi.

The famous description of Marly in the memoirs of Louis de Rouvroy, duc de Saint-Simon were written in retrospect and, for the initiation of Marly, at second hand; when Saint-Simon wrote, in 1715, Marly's heyday was ending, with the death of Louis XIV that year. Louis' heirs found the north-facing slope made Marly damp and dreary, and rarely visited.

The "river" was filled in and grassed in 1728. During the Revolution the marble horses by Guillaume Coustou the Elder, the Chevaux de Marly, were transported to Paris (1794), to flank the opening of the Champs-Élysées in the soon-to-be-renamed Place de la Concorde (they are now displayed in the Musée du Louvre, along with many other Marly sculptures).

In 1799/1800, Marly was sold to an industrialist, M. Sagniel, who installed machinery to spin cotton thread. When the factory failed in 1806, the château was demolished and its building materials sold, including the lead from its roof. Napoleon bought back the estate the following year; the empty gardens and the surrounding woodland park still belong to the State.

== Remains ==
At the end of the 19th century, several connoisseurs purchased leases on the individual garçonnières, cleaned up the overgrowth, recovered some bruised and broken statuary and recreated small gardens among the ruins: Alexandre Dumas, fils and the playwright and collector of 18th-century furnishings Victorien Sardou.

The Cour Marly of the Louvre museum was inaugurated in 1993. It contains mostly works of art from Marly, displayed on three levels.

== The Marly machine ==
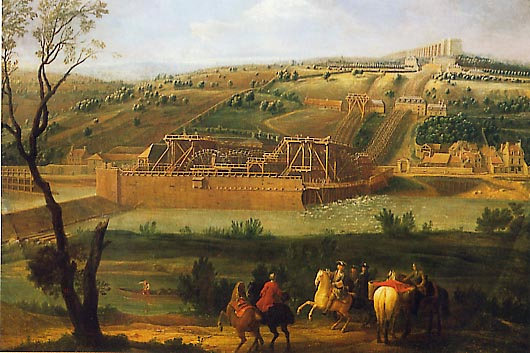
La machine de Marly by Pierre-Denis Martin, 1723.

Providing a sufficient water supply for the fountains at Versailles had been a problem from the outset. The construction of the Marly hydraulic machine, actually located in Bougival (where its inventor Rennequin Sualem died in 1708), driven by the current of the Seine moving fourteen vast paddle wheels, was a miracle of modern hydraulic engineering, perhaps the largest integrated machine of the 17th century.

It pumped water to a head of 100 meters into reservoirs at Louveciennes (where Madame du Barry had her château in the 1760s). The water then flowed either to fill the cascade at Marly or drive the fountains at Versailles — the latter, after passing through an elaborate underground network of reservoirs and aqueducts. The machine could only deliver sufficient pressure to satisfy either Marly or Versailles, and invariably the King's demands received priority.

In the nineteenth century, various other pumps replaced the originals, and the last was taken out of service in 1967.
