= Marly Horses =

Sculpture by Guillaume Coustou

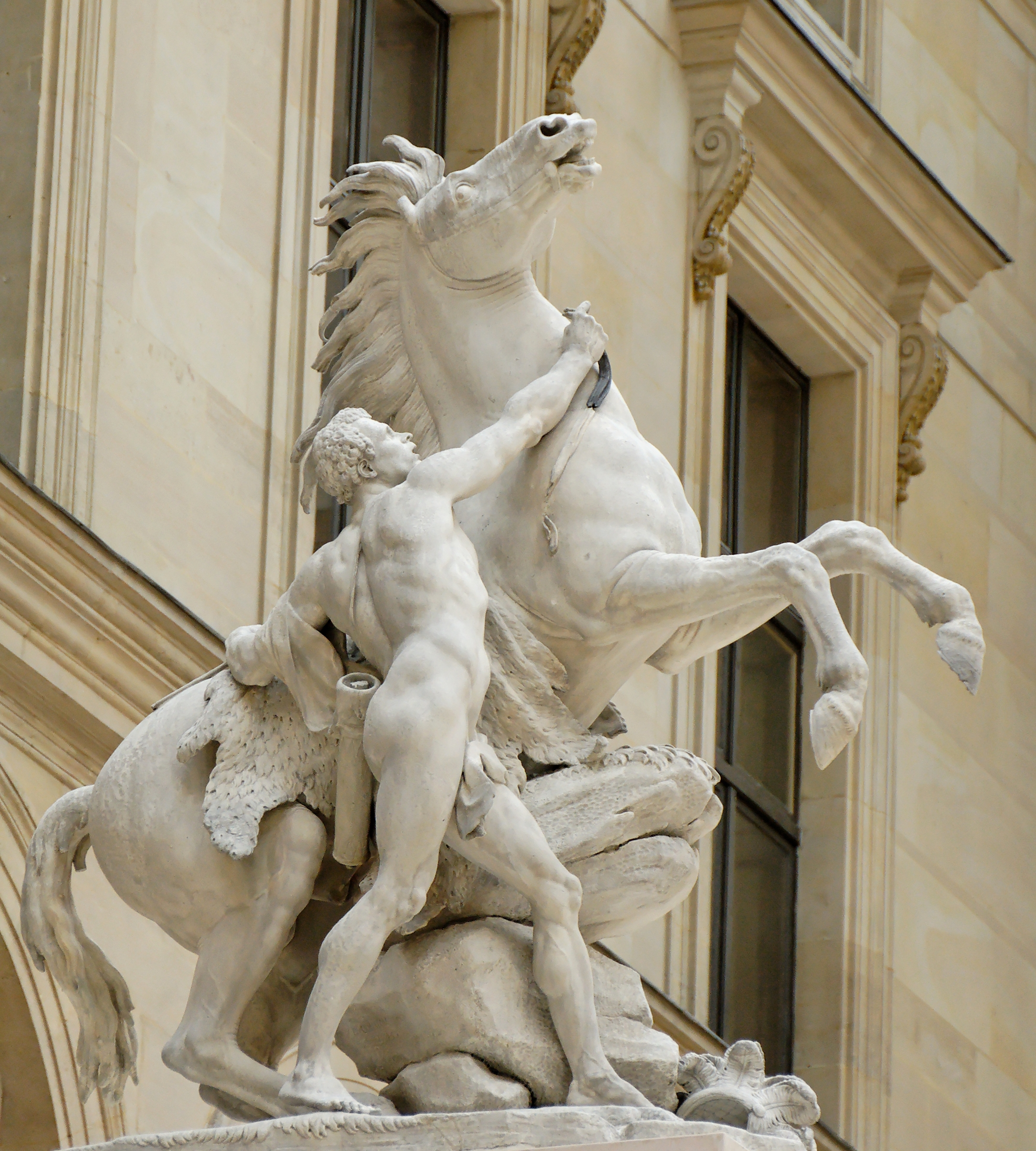

The Marly Horses are two 1743–1745 Carrara marble sculpted groups by Guillaume Coustou, showing two rearing horses with their groom. They were commissioned by King Louis XV for the trough at the entrance to the grounds of his château de Marly. Coustou's last works, they were intended to replace two other sculpted groups, Mercury on Pegasus and Pegasus, Renown of Horses, both by Antoine Coysevox, which had been removed to the Tuileries Gardens in 1719.

Louis XV chose the modellos in 1743 and the full-size sculptures were completed in only two years, being installed at Marly in 1745. They proved highly successful in reproduction, particularly on a smaller scale, and prefigured Théodore Géricault and other Romantic artists' obsession with equestrian subjects. The Marly horses were later also used as the central motif of the monochrome 819-line RTF/ORTF test card which was used on TF1 from 1953 until 1983.

The originals were moved to the place de la Concorde in Paris in 1794 and Louis-Denis Caillouette (1790–1868) restored them in 1840. In 1984 it was concluded that the annual military parades on 14 July were damaging the sculptures and they were replaced by marble copies produced by Michel Bourbon in the studio of a subsidiary of Bouygues. The latter also gained the right to an extra copy, which was placed in Bouygues's social building. The original sculptures were moved to a former courtyard in the Richelieu wing of the Louvre Museum, which was renamed the 'cour Marly' in their honour, whilst Bourbon's two main copies were moved to the originals' first site near the trough at Marly, with work overseen by the architect Serge Macel.

== Gallery ==
Moulages installés au château de Marly

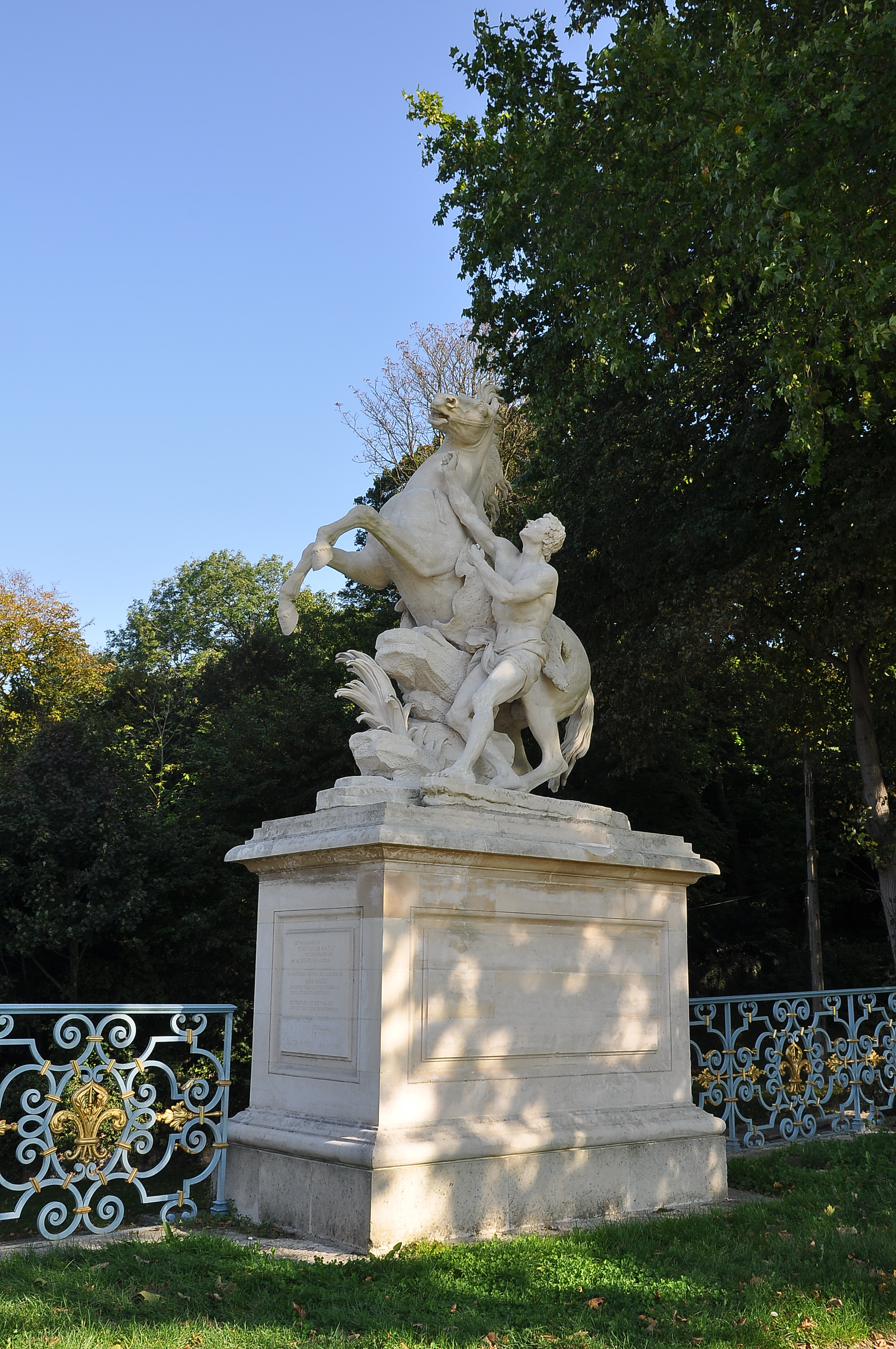

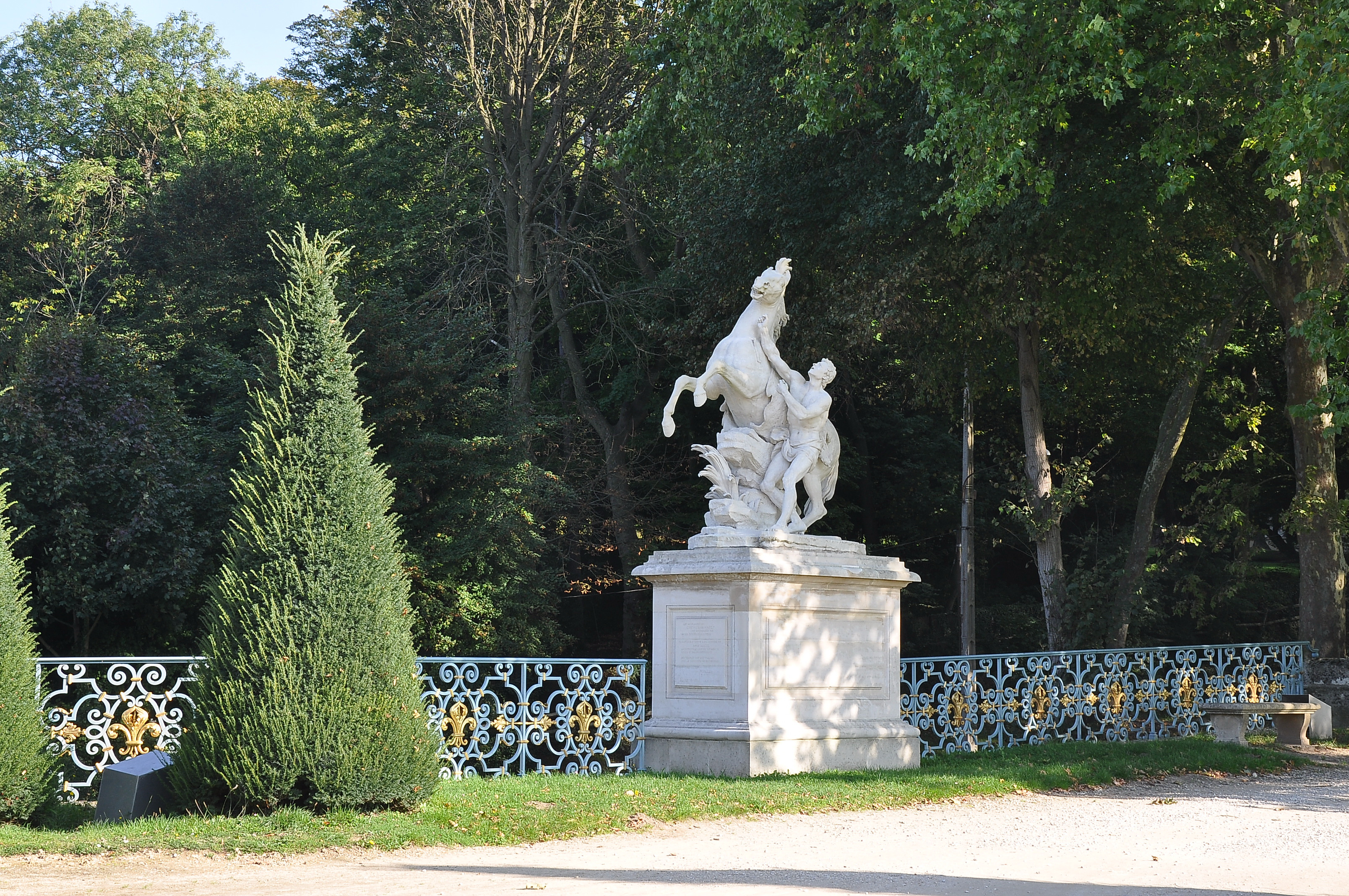
Sur l'avenue des Champs-Élysées

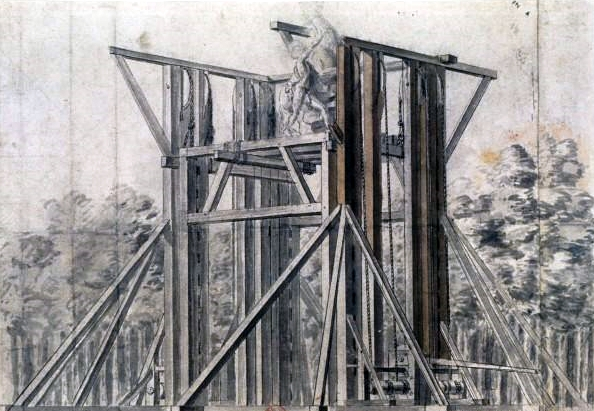
Installation des Chevaux de Marly aux Champs-Élysées en 1794.

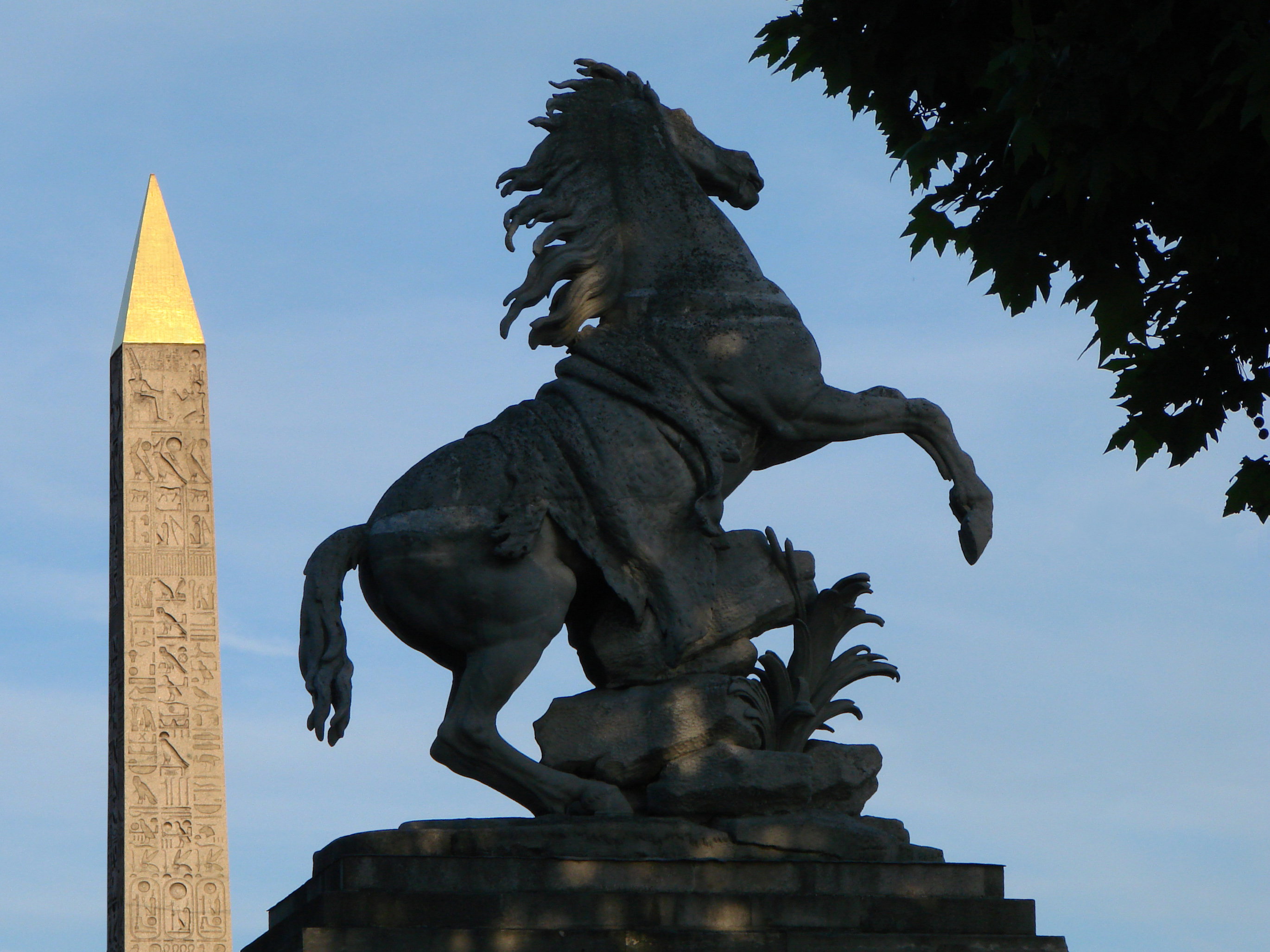
Copie de l'original, après déplacement de celui-ci au Louvre.
