= Notre-Dame-de-Lorette, Paris =

Church in Paris, France

Coordinates: 48°52′35″N 2°20′20″E

Notre-Dame-de-Lorette
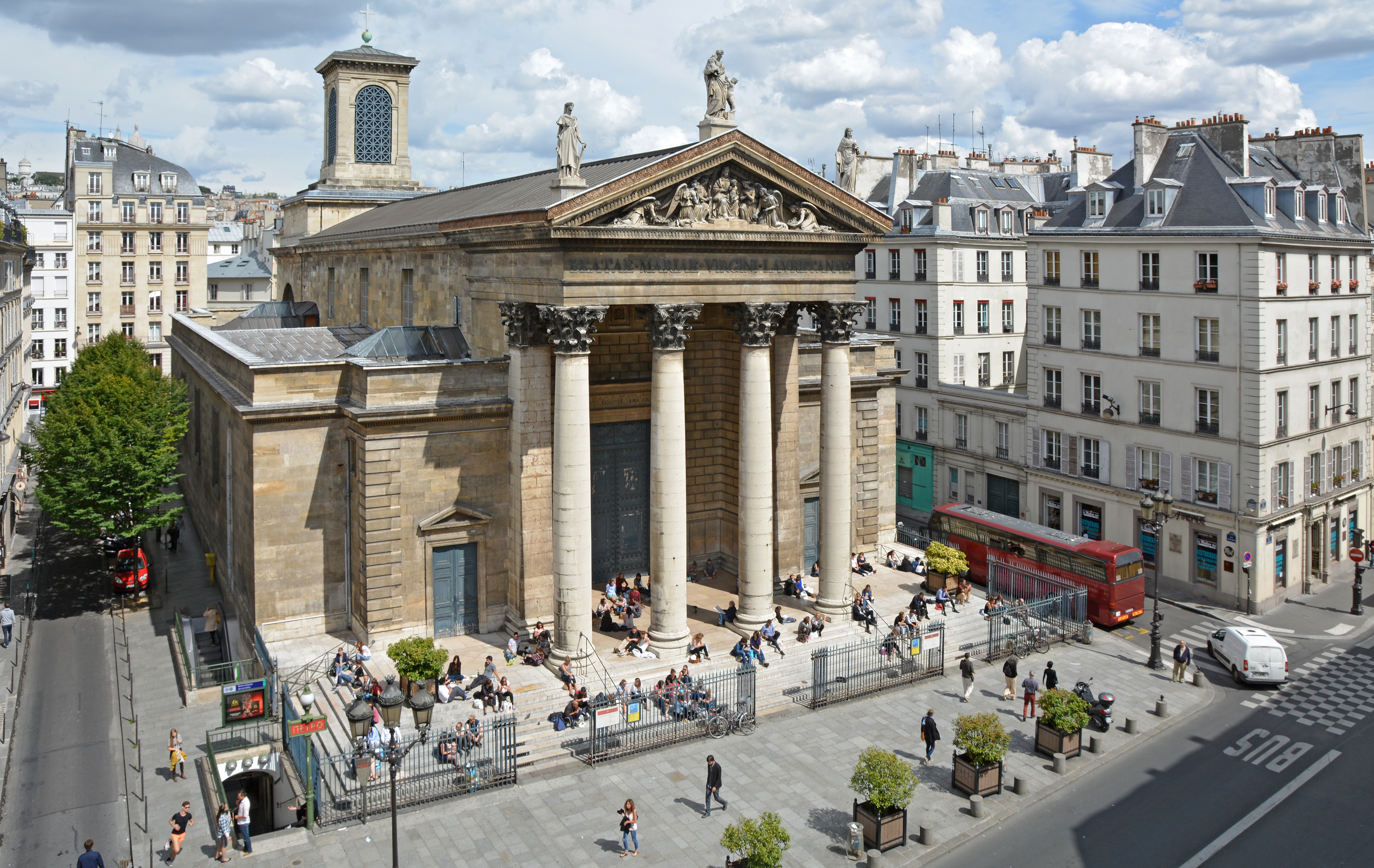
- Notre-Dame-de-Lorette

Religion
- Province: Archdiocese of Paris

Location
- Location: 18 bis, Rue de Châteaudun, 9th arrondissement
- Interactive map of Notre-Dame-de-Lorette

Architecture
- Architect: Louis Hippolyte Lebas
- Style: Neo-classical
- Groundbreaking: 1823
- Completed: 1836

Website
- Site web de la paroisse

Notre-Dame-de-Lorette (French pronunciation: [nɔtʁə dam də lɔʁɛt]) is a Roman Catholic church located in the 9th arrondissement of Paris, It was built between 1823 and 1836 in the Neo-classical architectural style by architect Louis-Hippolyte Lebas, in a neighbourhood known as the New Athens, for its many artistic and scholarly residents in the 19th century, including George Sand, Pierre-Auguste Renoir, and Alexandre Dumas. While the exterior is classical and austere, the church interior is known for its rich collection of paintings, sculpture, and polychrome decoration.

== History ==
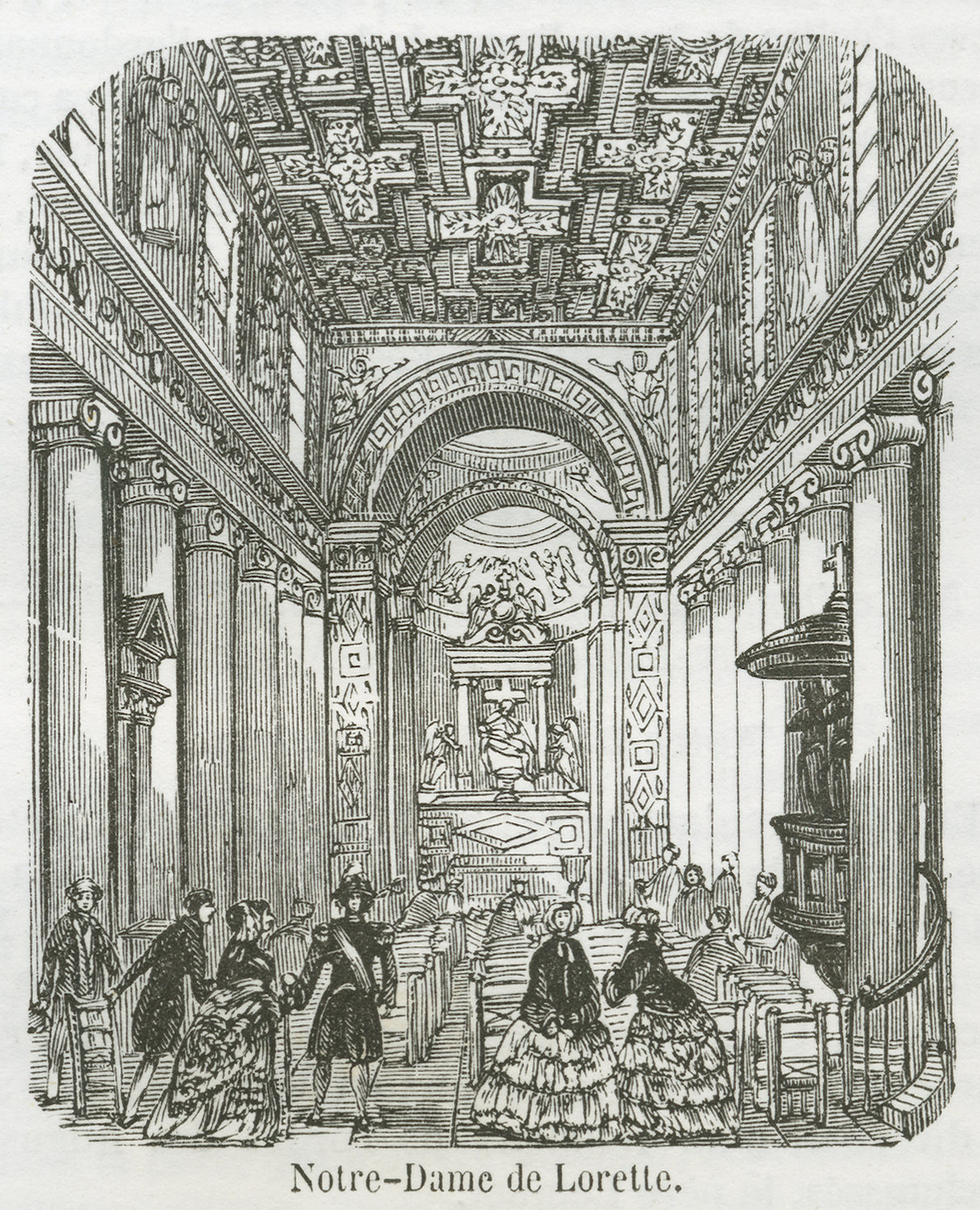
Church interior in 1855

A 17th-century chapel dedicated to Notre-Dame-de-Lorette had existed on the same site at 54 rue Lamartine, but during the French Revolution it was nationalised by the Revolutionary government, closed, sold and demolished. In 1821, as the population of the neighbourhood was growing rapidly, plans were made to build a new church, with Louis-Hippolyte Lebas as the architect. Originally, the church was planned to face northward towards Montmartre, but it was modified to face southward towards rue Laffitte.

Two notable figures in French culture were baptized at Notre-Dame-de-Lorette. Composer Georges Bizet received his baptism at the church on March 16, 1840, while painter Claude Monet was baptized on May 20, 1841. Also, one of the Polish national poets, Zygmunt Krasiński was baptized here on February 19, 1812.

In the 1840s The name of the church inspired the term "Lorette" for a woman of loose morals. The term appeared in the 1840s in newspapers, songs and novels, due to the number of prostitutes who resided in buildings near the church.

== Exterior ==
The facade features four Corinthian columns, and an entablement and a fronton with sculpture. Atop the fronton are three statues, depicting the virtues; Faith, carrying a calice and a Bible (right); Charity, with two infants (top); and Hope, represented by a woman with an anchor (left). These are the work of Charles René Laitié (1782–1862). Below, the triangular tympanum depicts "Homage to the Virgin", a bas-relief depicting angels worshipping the Virgin Mary. The tympanum was made by the sculptor Charles-François Leboeuf-Nanteuil (1792–1865) France's motto Liberté, égalité, fraternité (Liberty, equality, fraternity) was inscribed above the church's main entrance in 1902 by local government authorities as an assertion of public ownership at a time of intense church-state conflict.

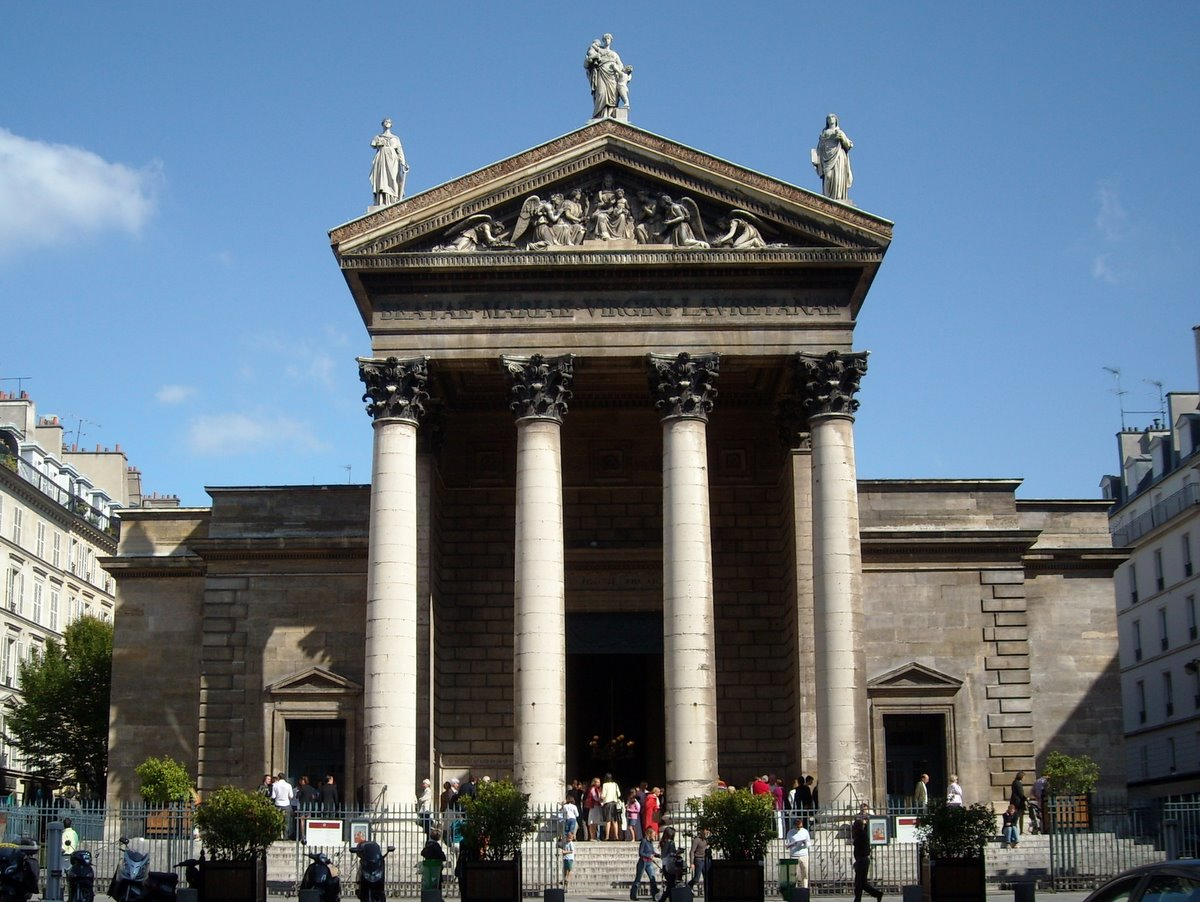
The façade, topped with statues of Faith, Charity and Hope

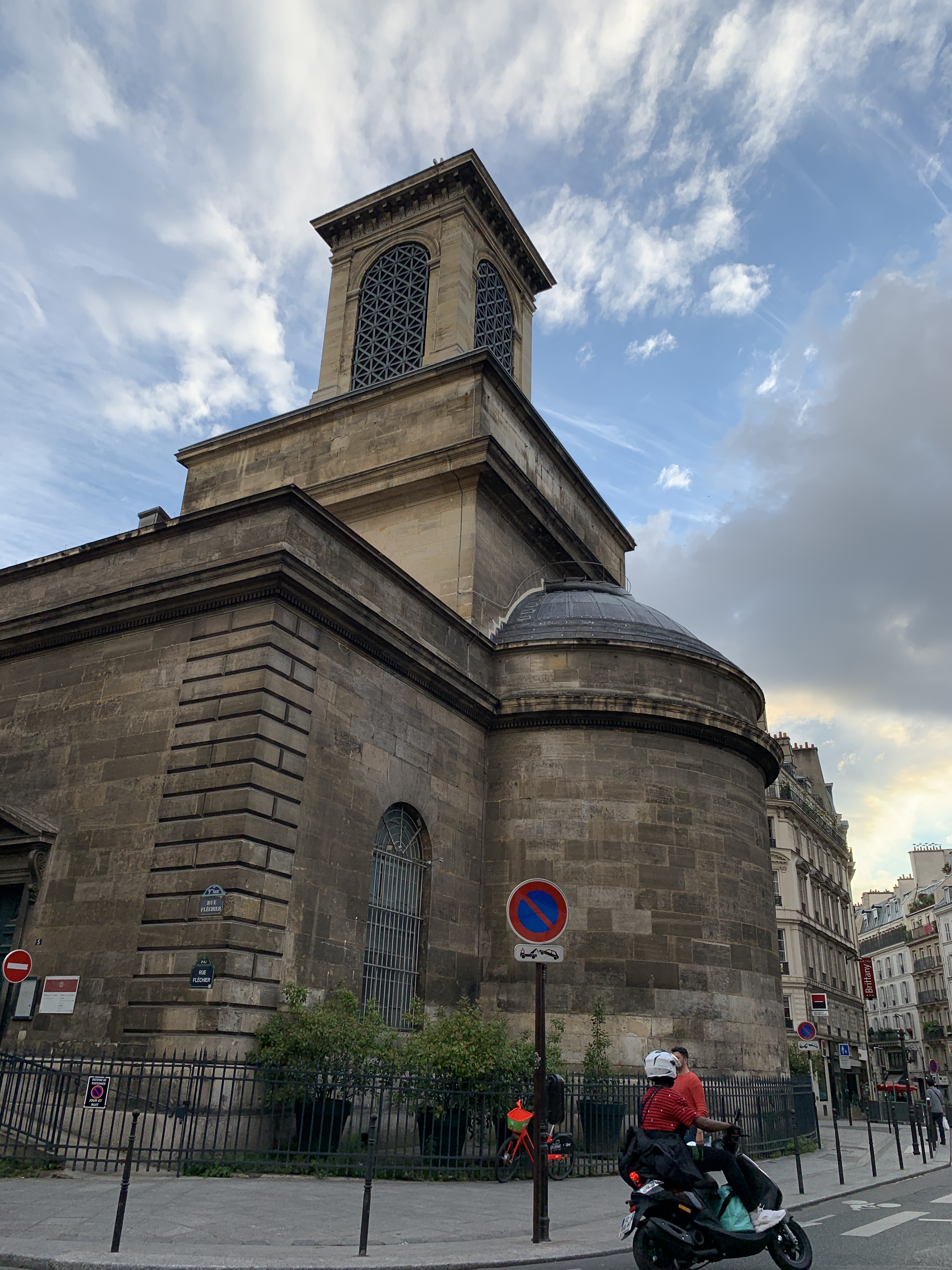
The apse and the bell tower

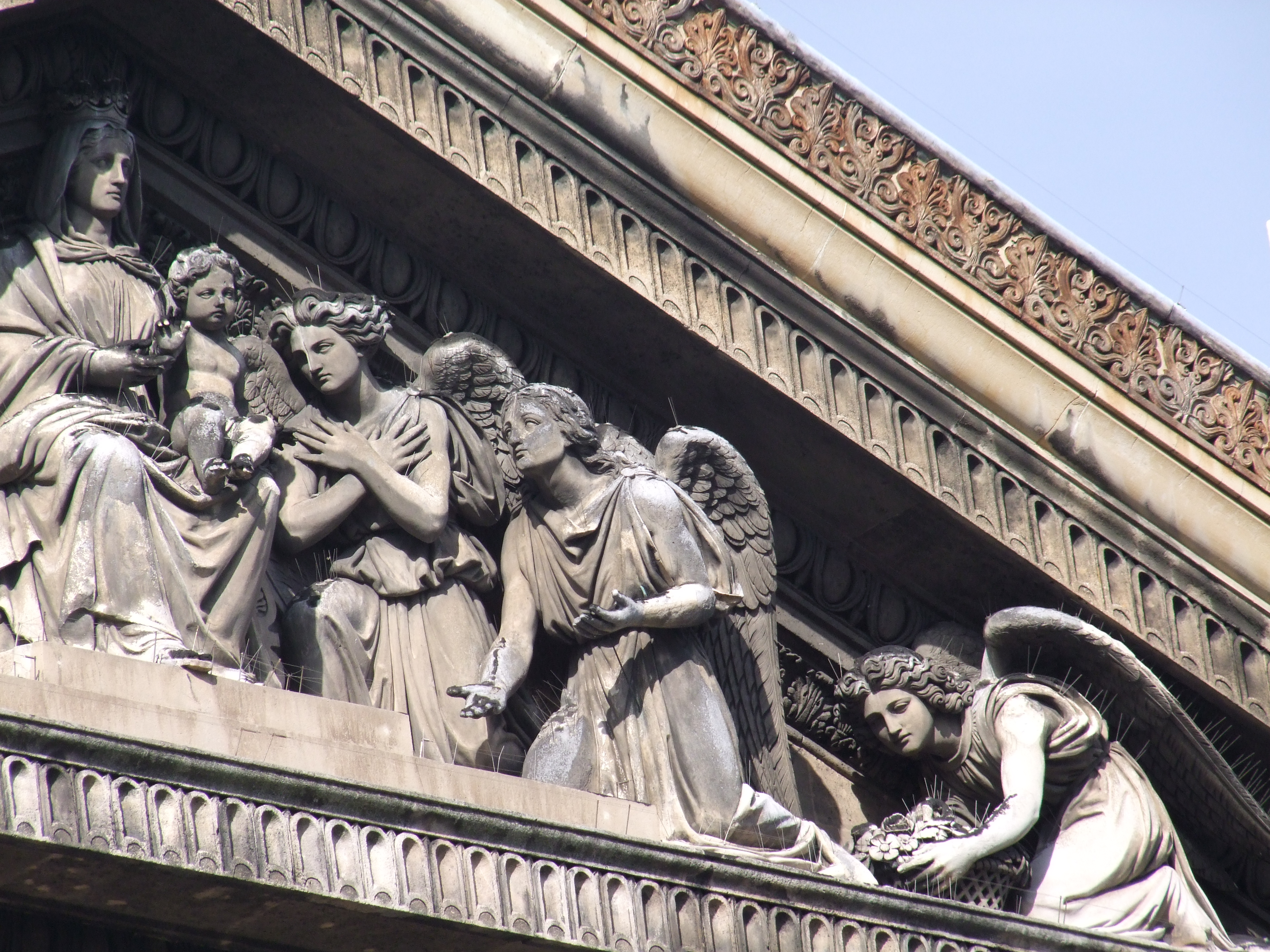
Detail of the tympanum; "Homage to the Virgin"

== Interior ==
The early 19th century was characterized with neoclassical building styles, with the church also being designed in this manner. Instead of decorative paintings being placed on the church's walls, murals were painted directly onto them, similarly to the Basilica di Santa Maria Maggiore in Rome. The façade features Charles-François Lebœuf's sculpture Six angels in adoration before the Madonna and Child. Inside are the statues of Charles-René Laitié, Philippe Joseph Henri Lemaire and Denis Foyatier, who represent the three theological virtues of charity, hope and faith, respectively.

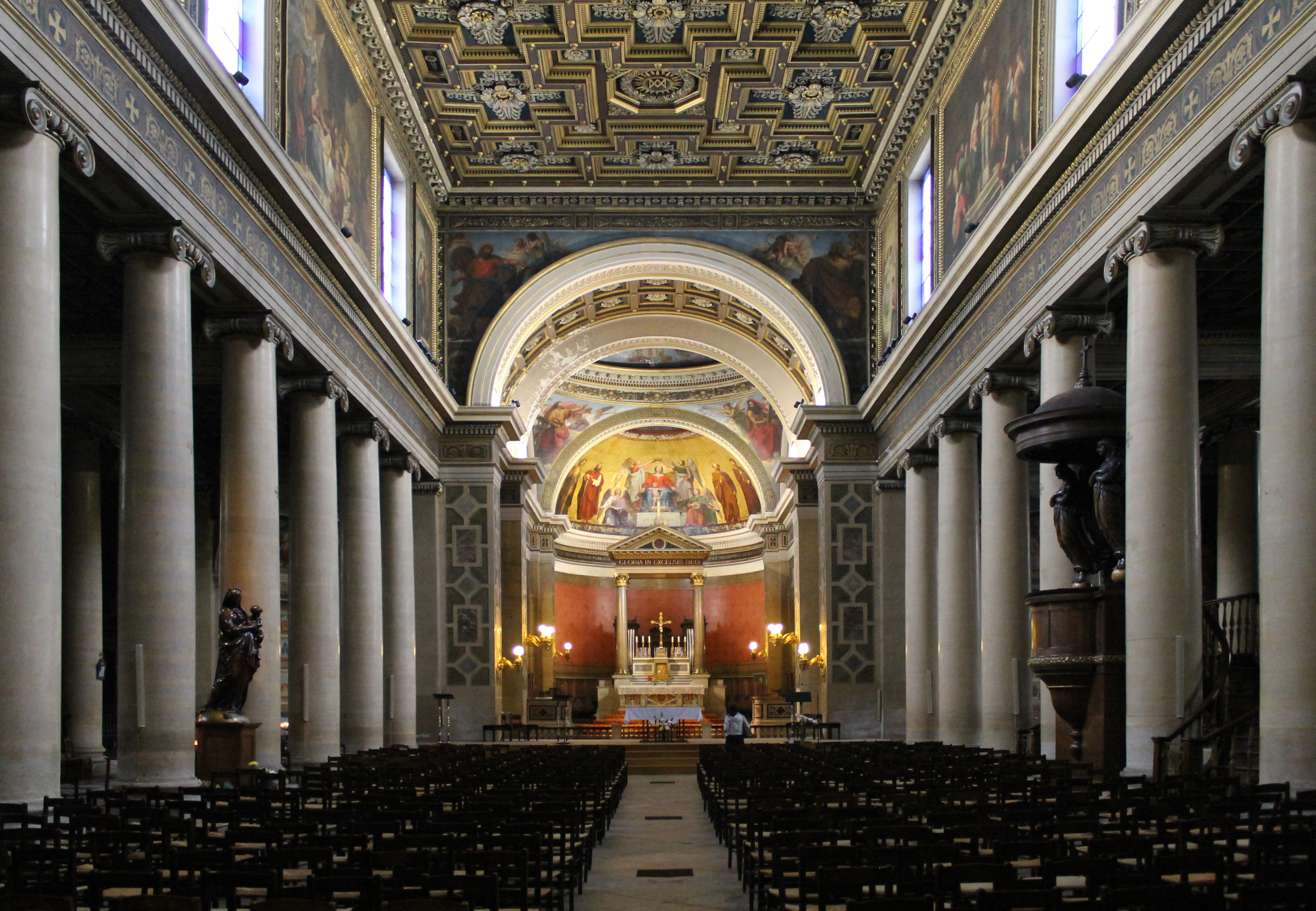
Interior of Église of Notre-Dame-de-Lorette

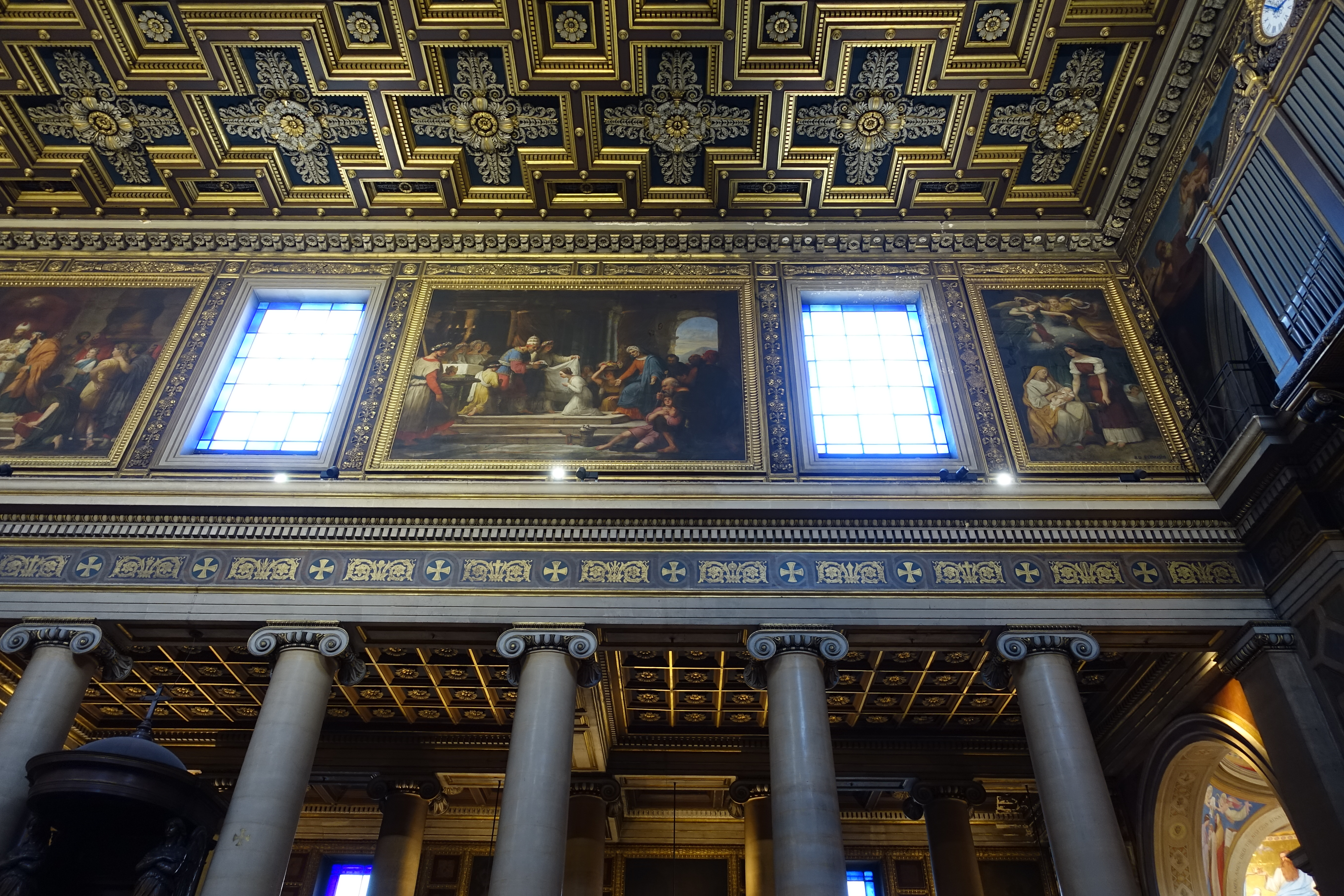
Upper walls of the nave lined with paintings

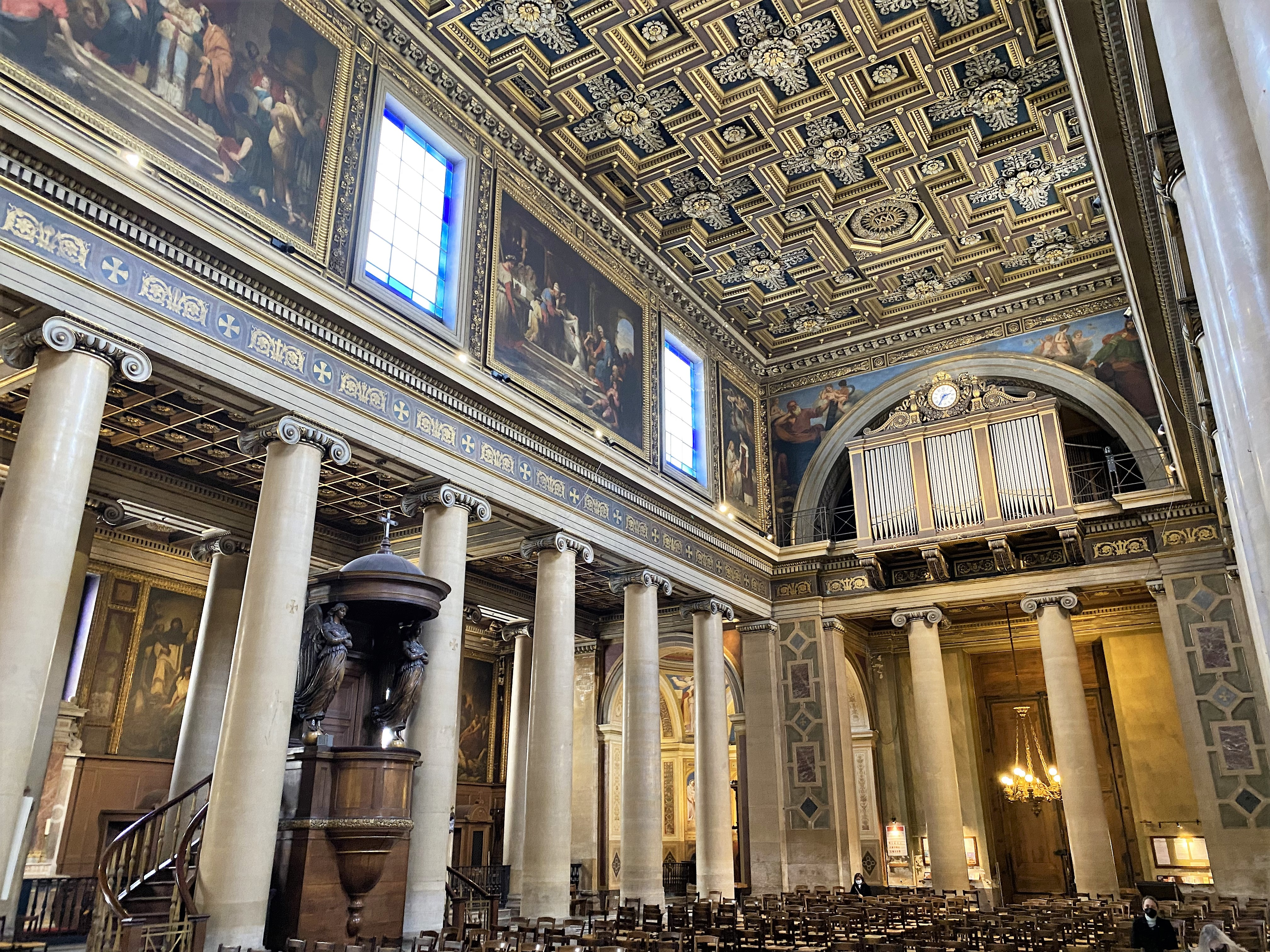
The grand organ on the tribune of nave entrance

== The choir ==
Since the church does not have a transept, the border between the nave and the choir is marked by a large triumphal arch. The choir of the church, the area where the altar is located, is particularly packed with decoration. which includes murals, sculpture, inlaid walls, and coffered arches and ceilings.

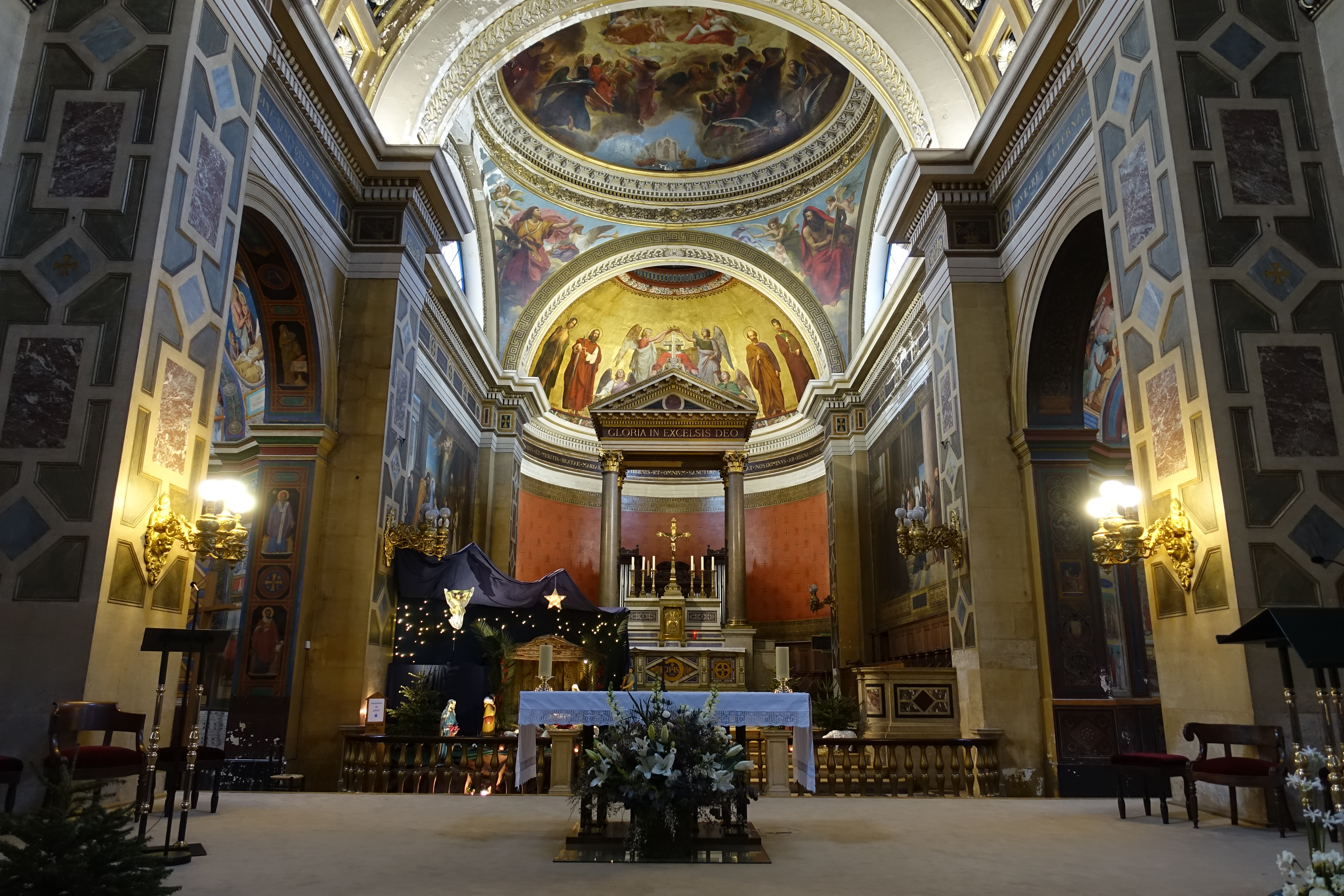
The choir and altar

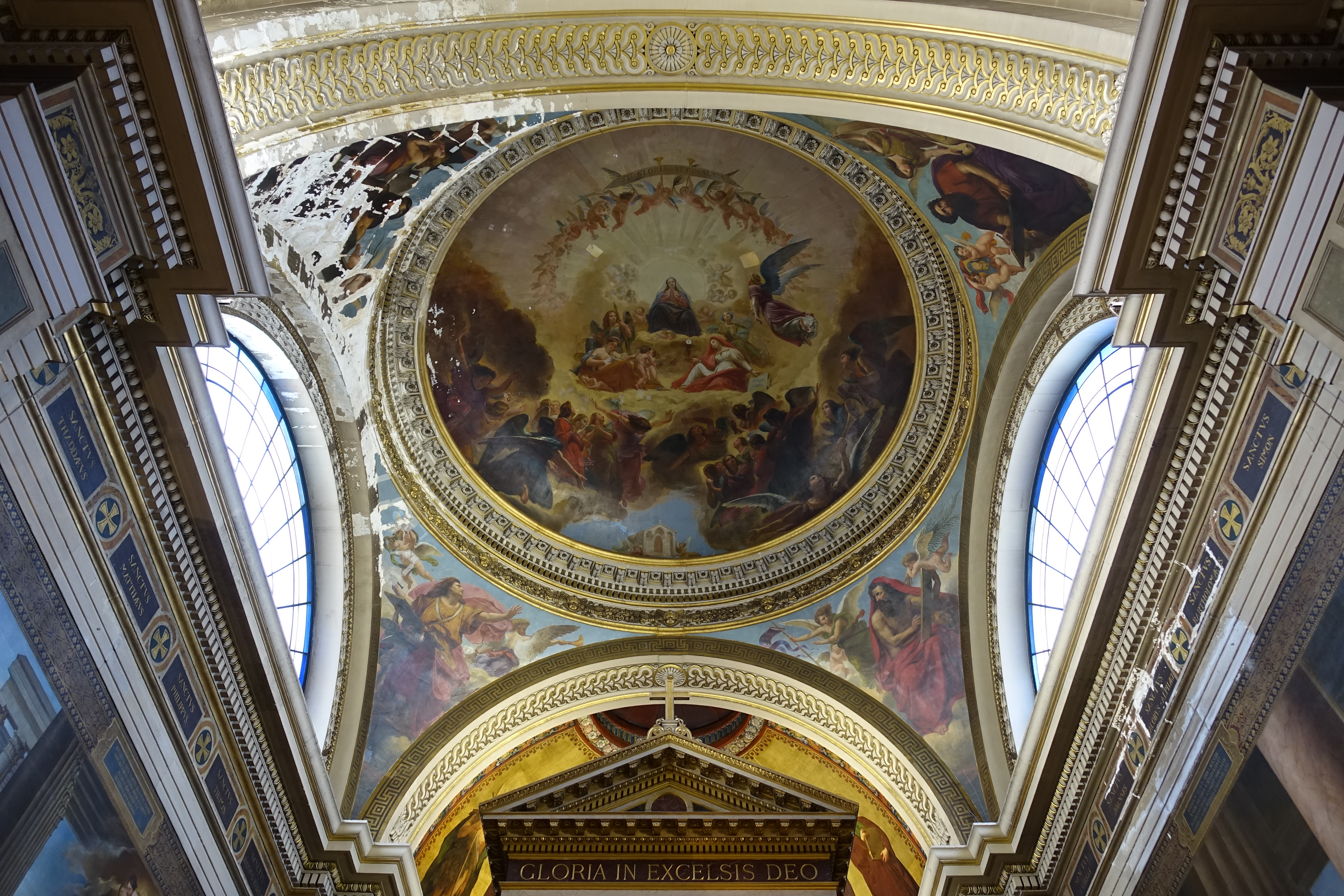
The dome over the altar

== Collateral aisles ==
The collateral aisles are separated from the nave and choir by roles of Doric columns, and give access to the side chapels. They have their own elaborate decoration, including coffered ceilings.

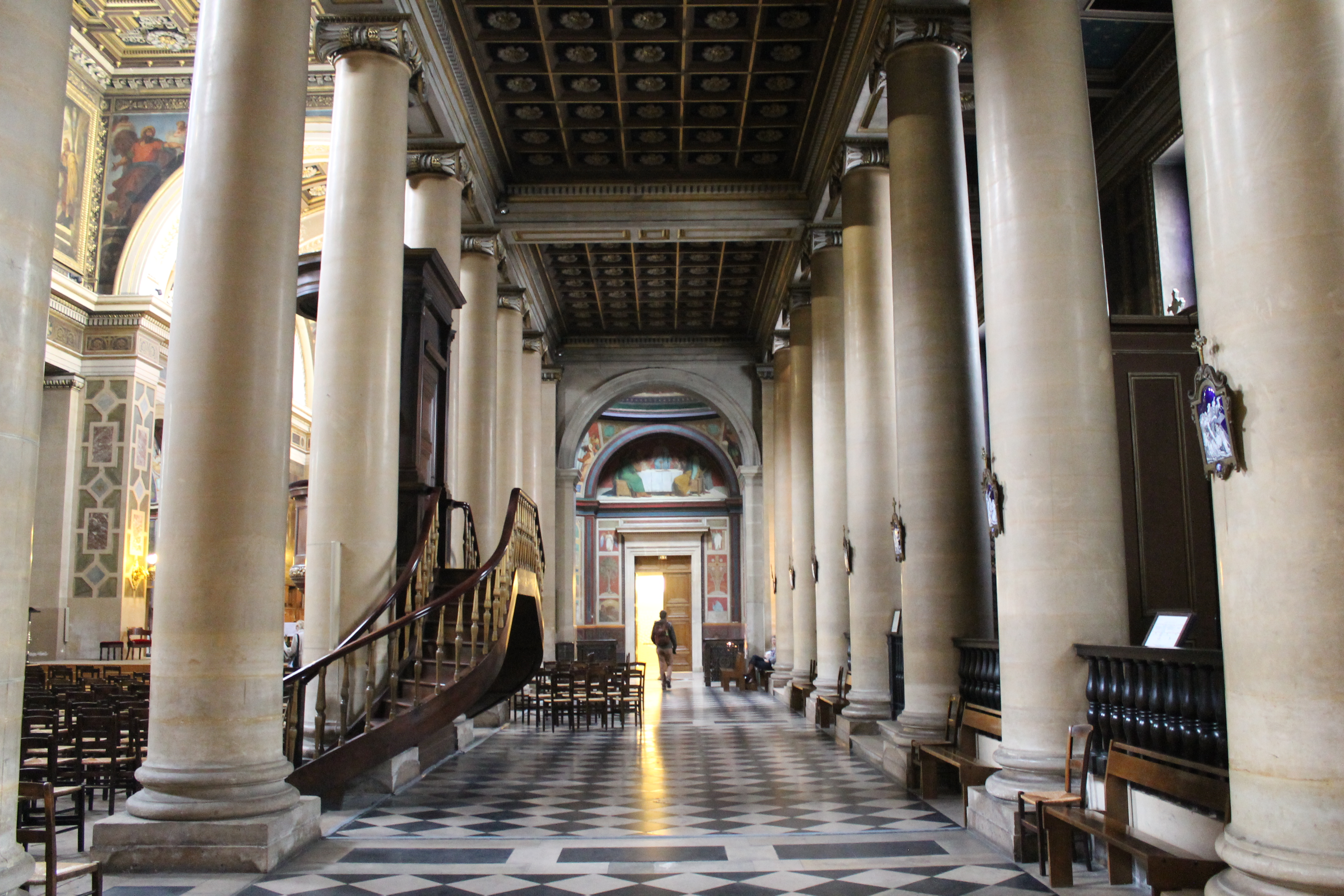
Collateral aisle behind the pulpit

== Chapels ==
The church has four large chapels at the corners and six smaller chapels aligned along the side aisles.

The Chapel of the Virgin and of Marriage also has very colorful murals by the painter Victor Orsel (1795–1850), which depict "Litanies of Notre Dame de Lorette". Orsel was the head of a school of French religioua painters known as the Nazaréens.

The Chapel of Baptism, located near the entrance, is decorated with murals by Adolphe Roger (1800–1880), depicting events from the Old Testament, beginning with Adam and Eve and the Original Sin, to the Baptism of Christ. on the half-dome overhead, he painted "The Spirit of Christians renewed by baptism" and on the pillars "The Four Continents." Roger made direct references to the Italian primitive artists, including Masaccio and Fra Angelico. He was a leading practitioner of the new style "Archaisant", inspired by the art of earlier periods, which became an important school during the 19th century.

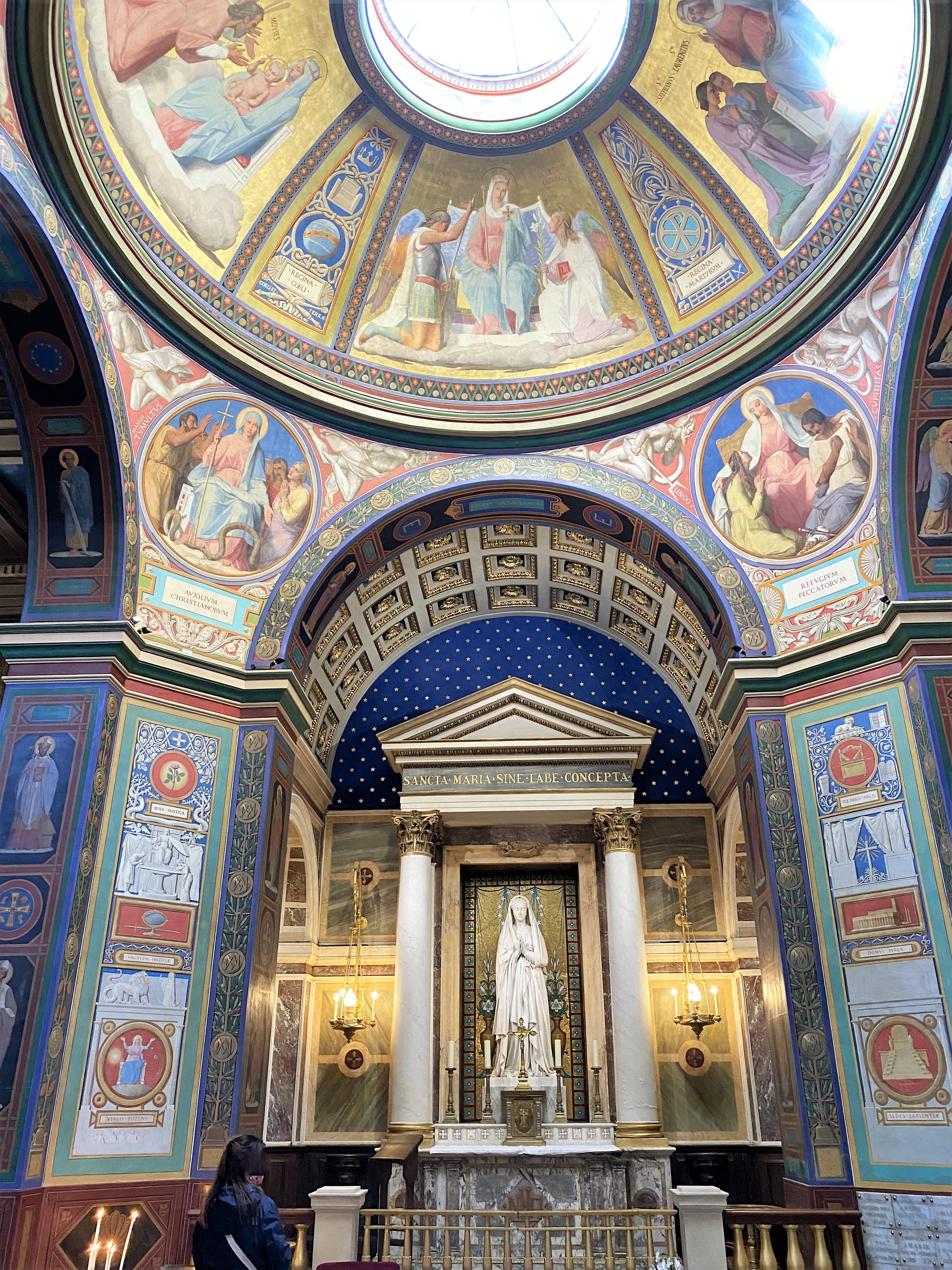
The Chapel of the Virgin

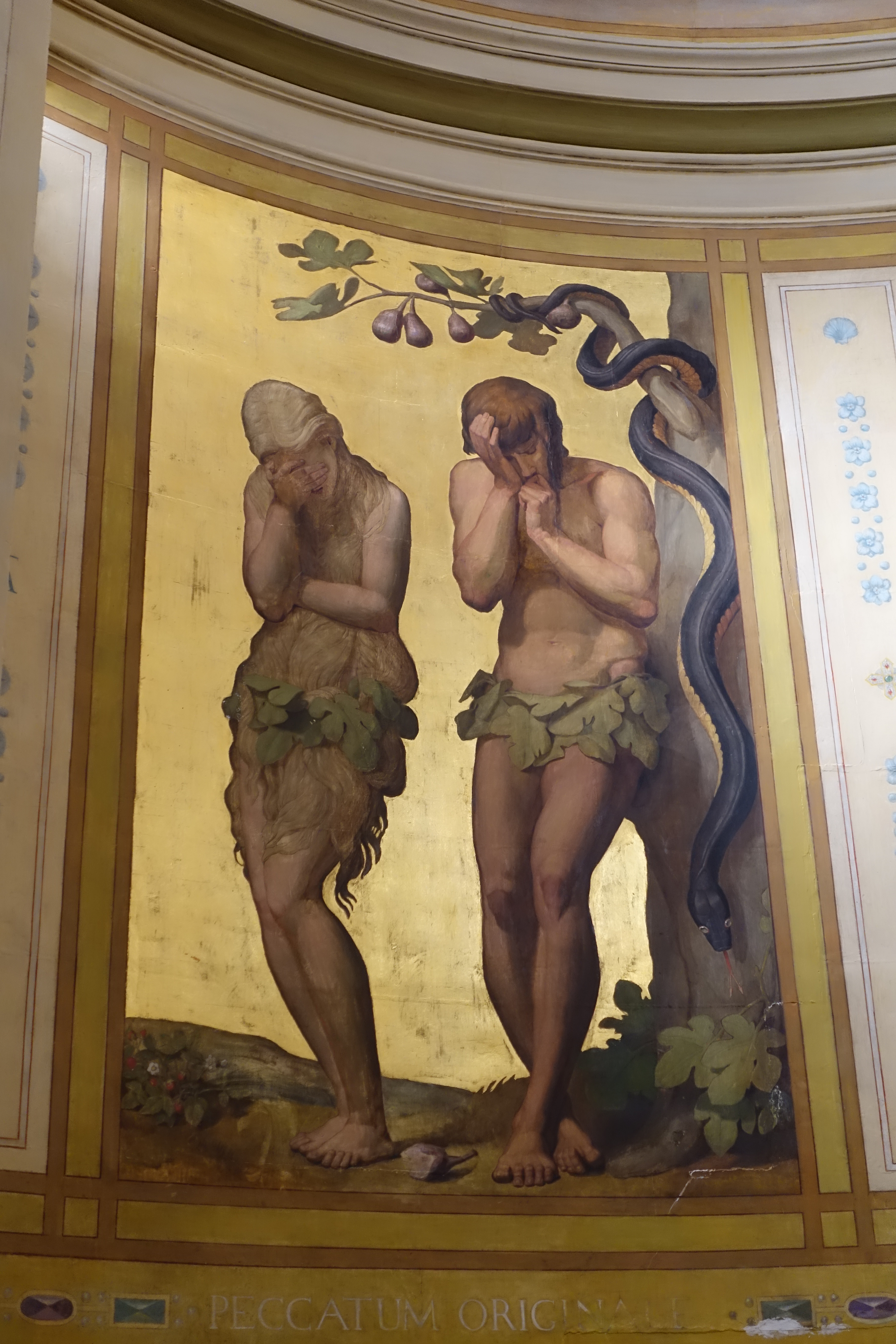
Adam and Eve in the Chapel of Baptism

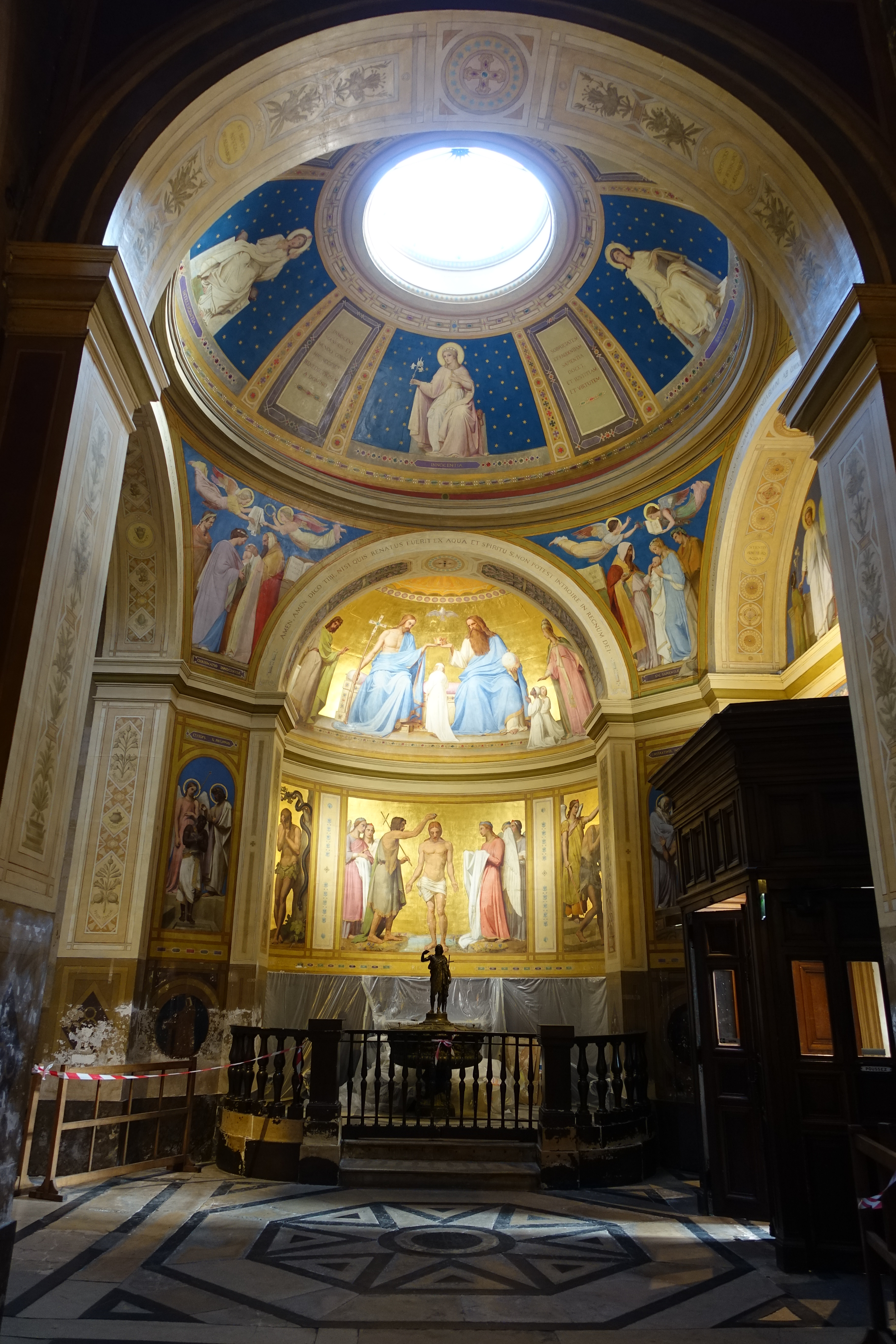
The Chapel of Baptism

== Ceilings ==
The coffered ceilings of the church are among its most famous features. They were created by Hubert-Nicolas Lamontagne, and are composed of interlocking cruciform coffers or caissons made of gilded wood. Similar ceilings are found at the Santa Maria Maggiore Basilica in Rome and the Palazzo Vecchio in Florence.

The designs of the ceiling represent the monogram of the Virgin Mary, the dove of the Holy Spirit, and roses; in theology, Mary is "the Mystic Rose".

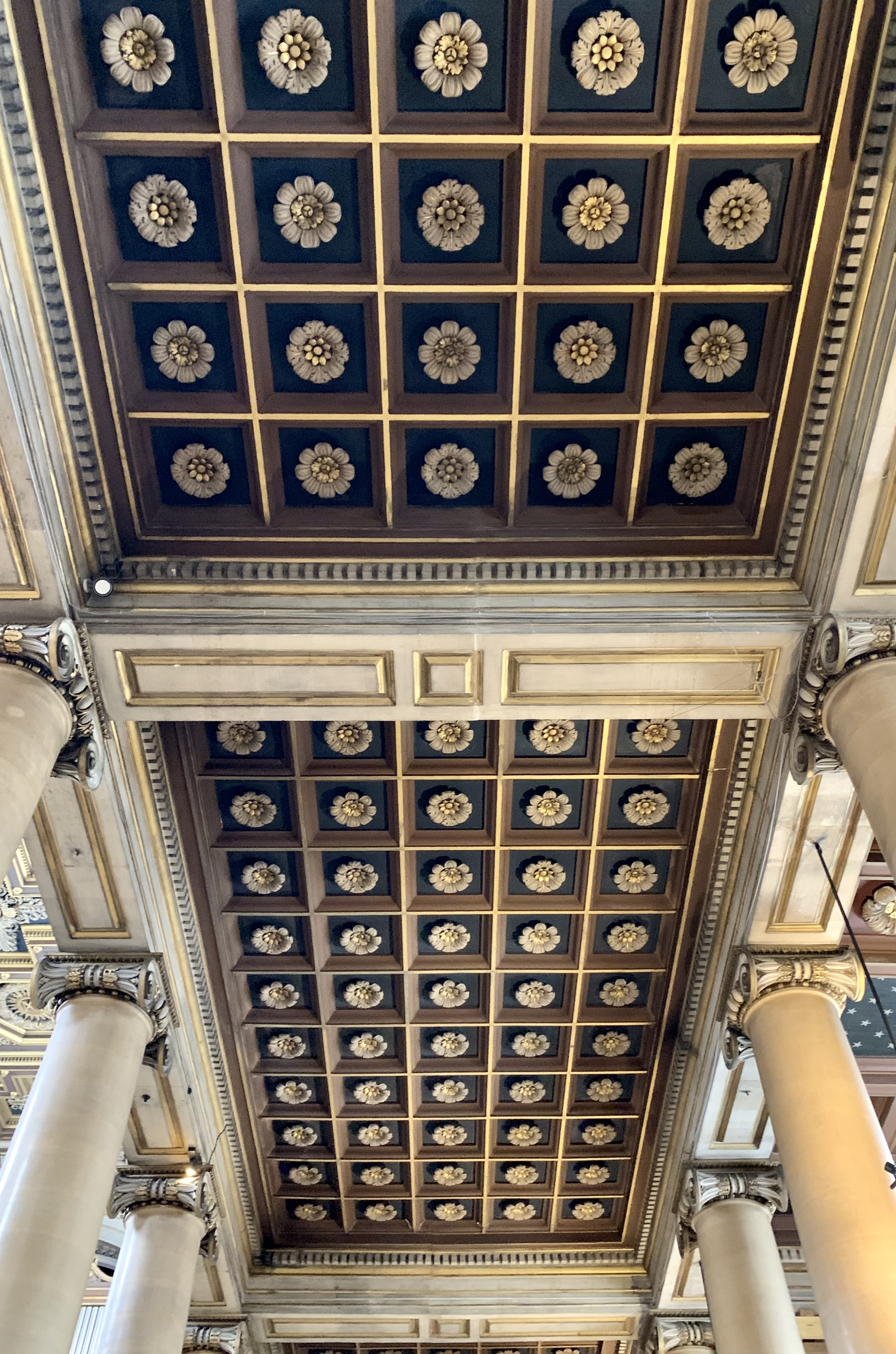
Coffered ceiling of collateral aisle

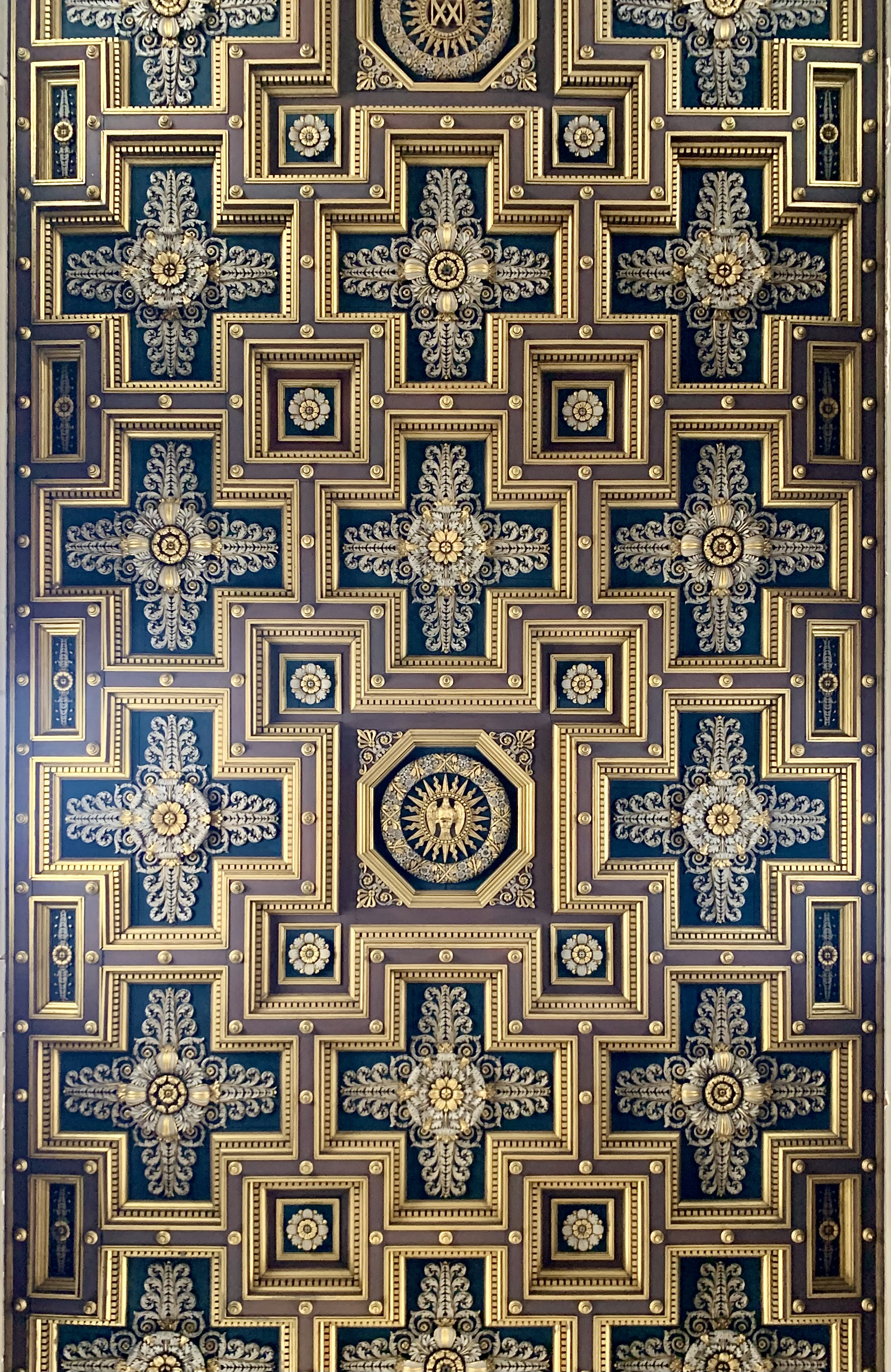
Ceiling of the nave

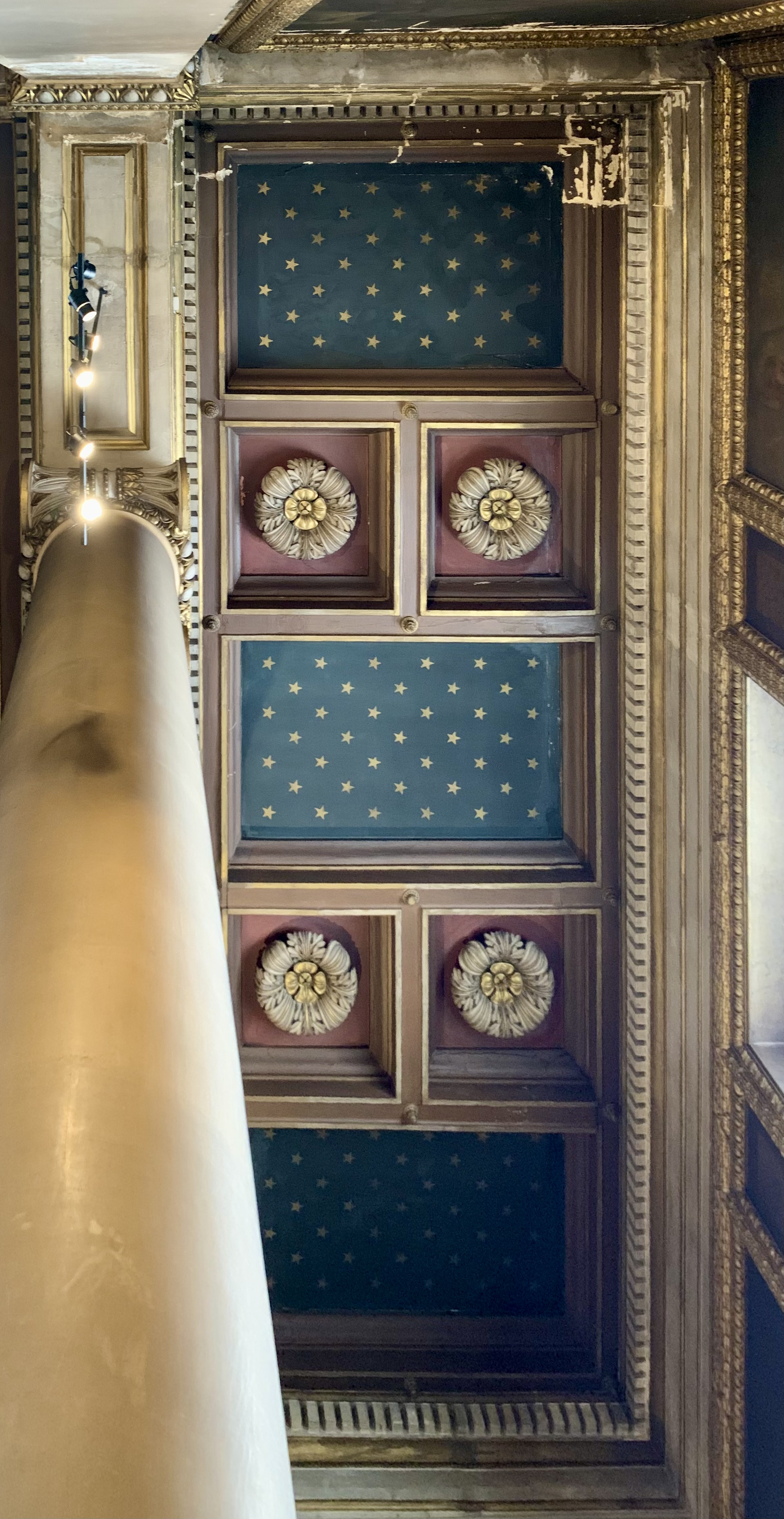
ceiling

== Stained glass ==
All of windows of the church are made of white or simple colored glass without figures with one exception, "The Window of Assumption". The window was designed by the painter Jérôme-Marie Delorme and made by the Sèvres Porcelain Manufactory. The window is almost hidden in the oratory, in a small room at the end of the lower left side of the church. Visitors much request permission to see it.

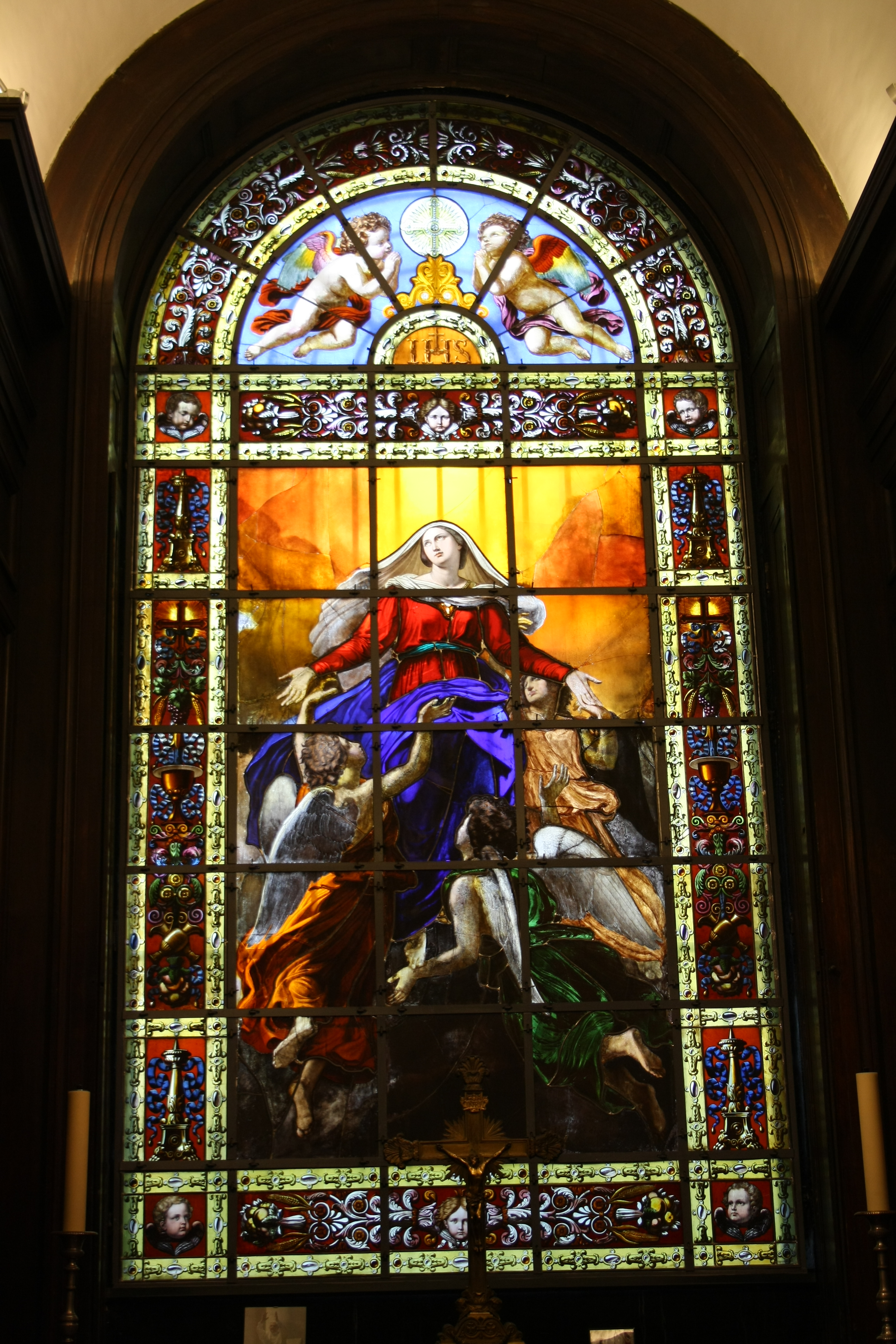
"The Assumption" window, by Jerome-Marie Delorme

== Paintings ==
There is not a flat surface in the church interior which is not decorated in some way. The paintings and murals in the church give a very good summary of religious art in France in the 1830s, which was influenced by Italian painters of the early Renaissanc, such as Massacio

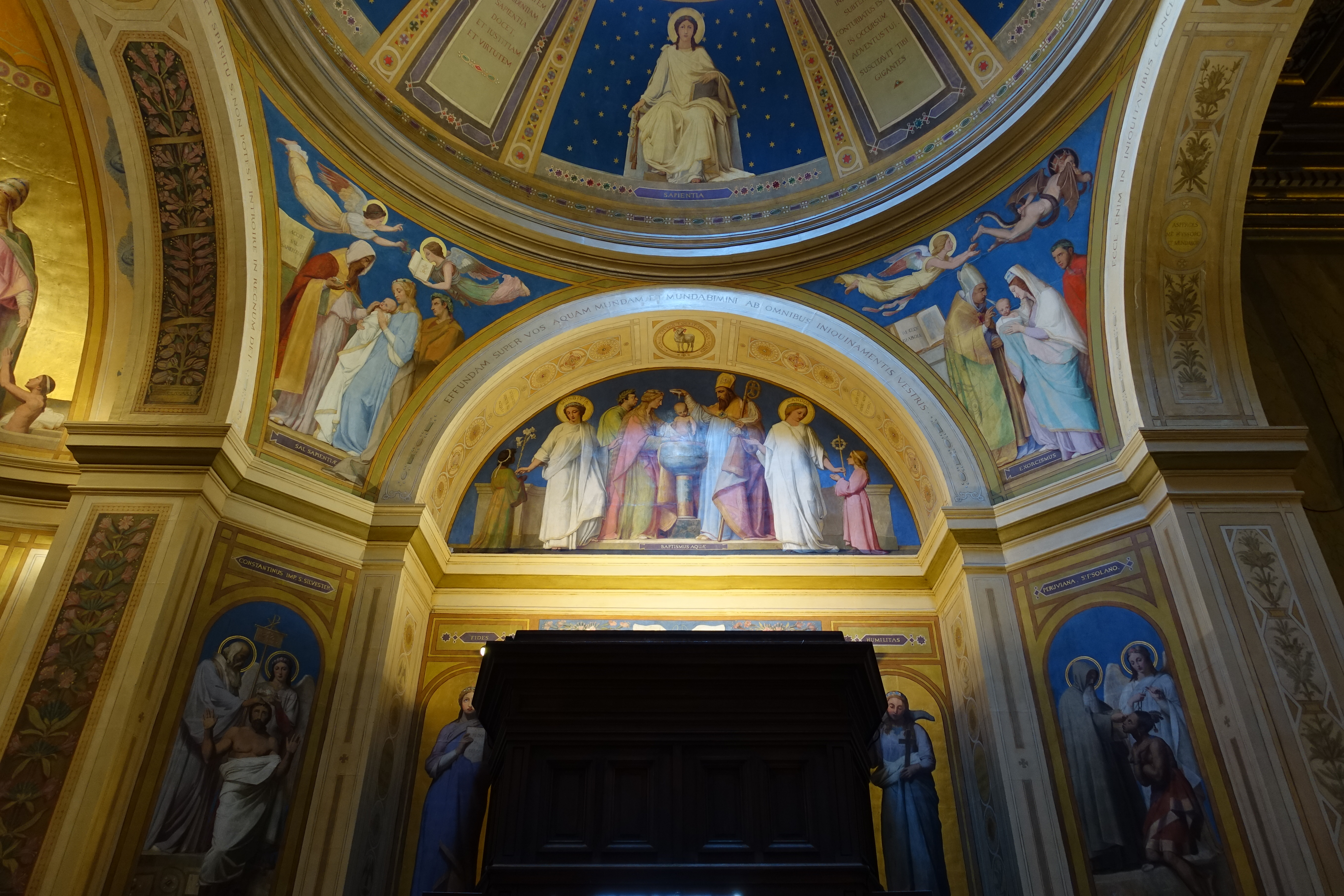
Chapel of Batpism murals by Adolphe Roger (1800–1880)

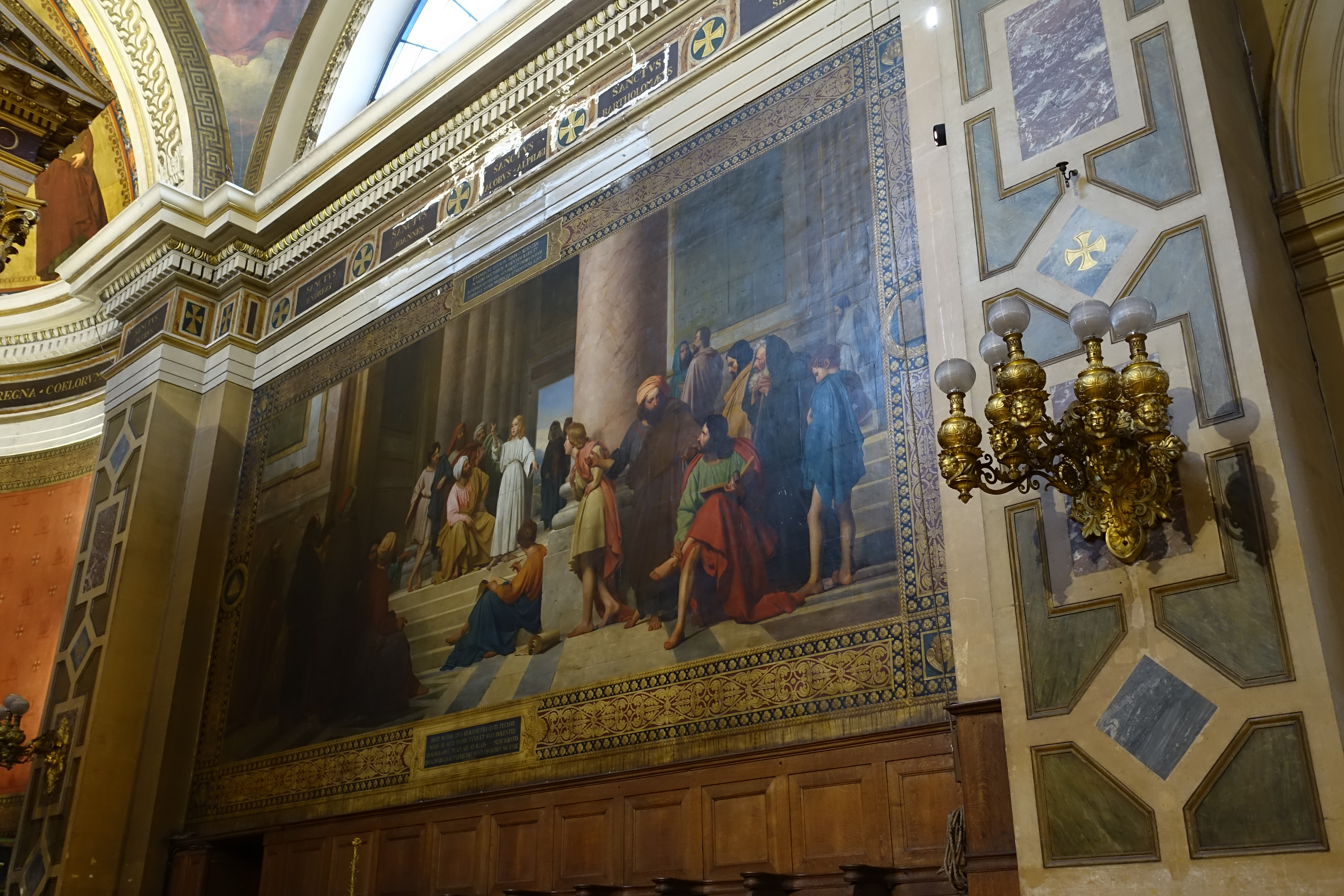
"Jésus among the Doctors of Lawedi" by Michel-Martin Drolling (1786–1851) (nave)

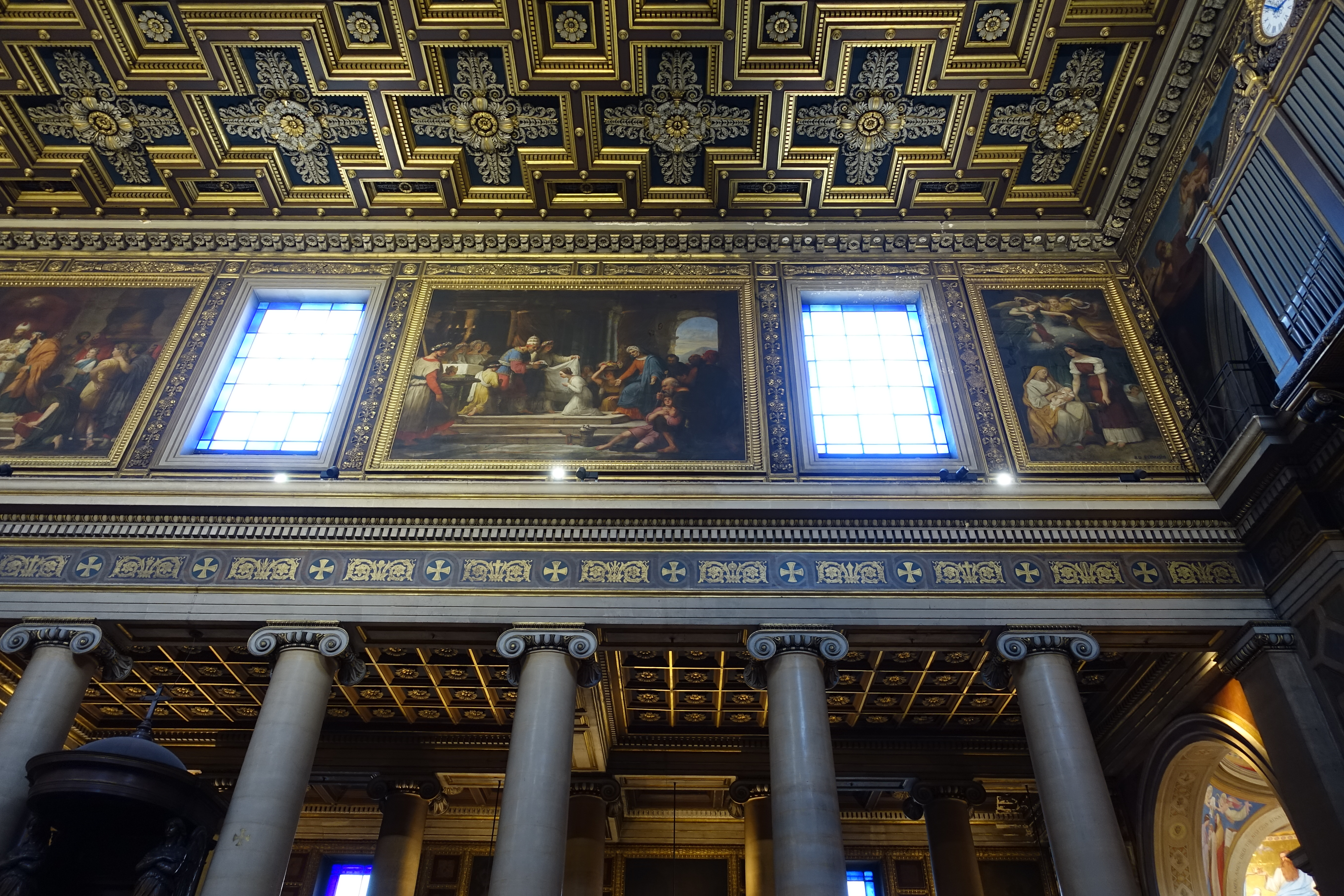
"Presentation of the Virgin" by Auguste Vinchon (1833) (center)
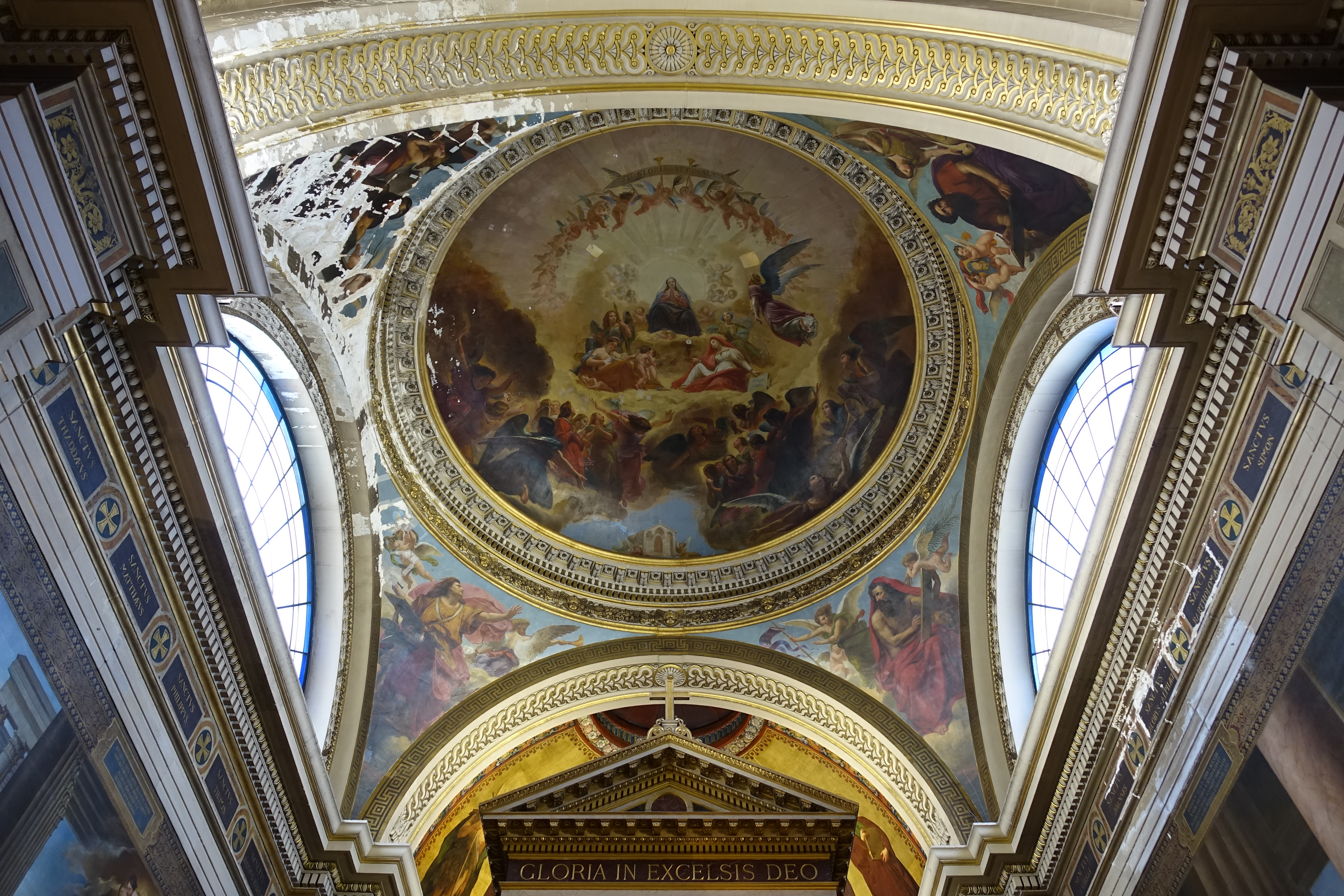
"The triumph of the Virgin" by Pierre-François Delorme (1783–1859) (over choir)

== Sculpture ==
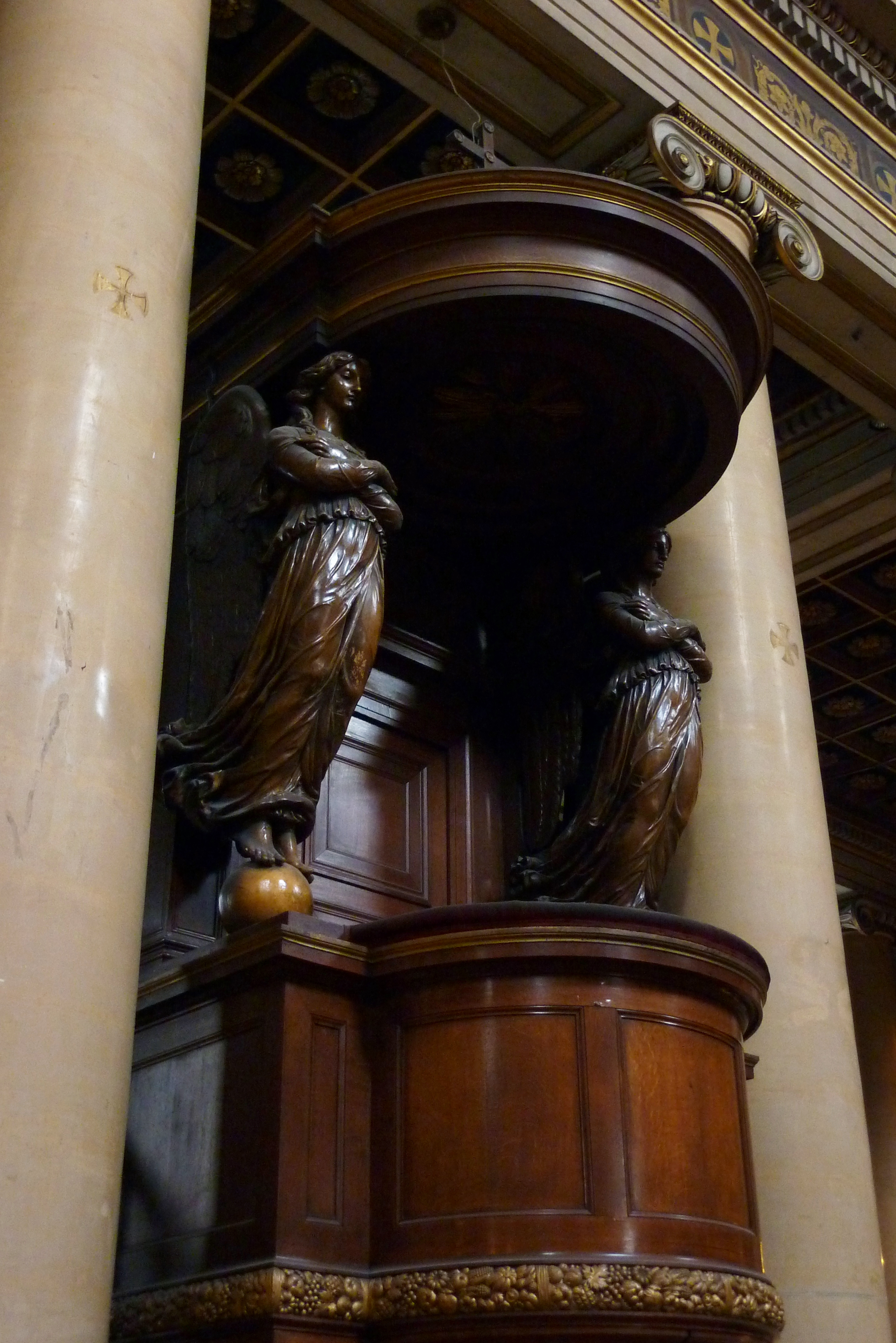
The pulpit

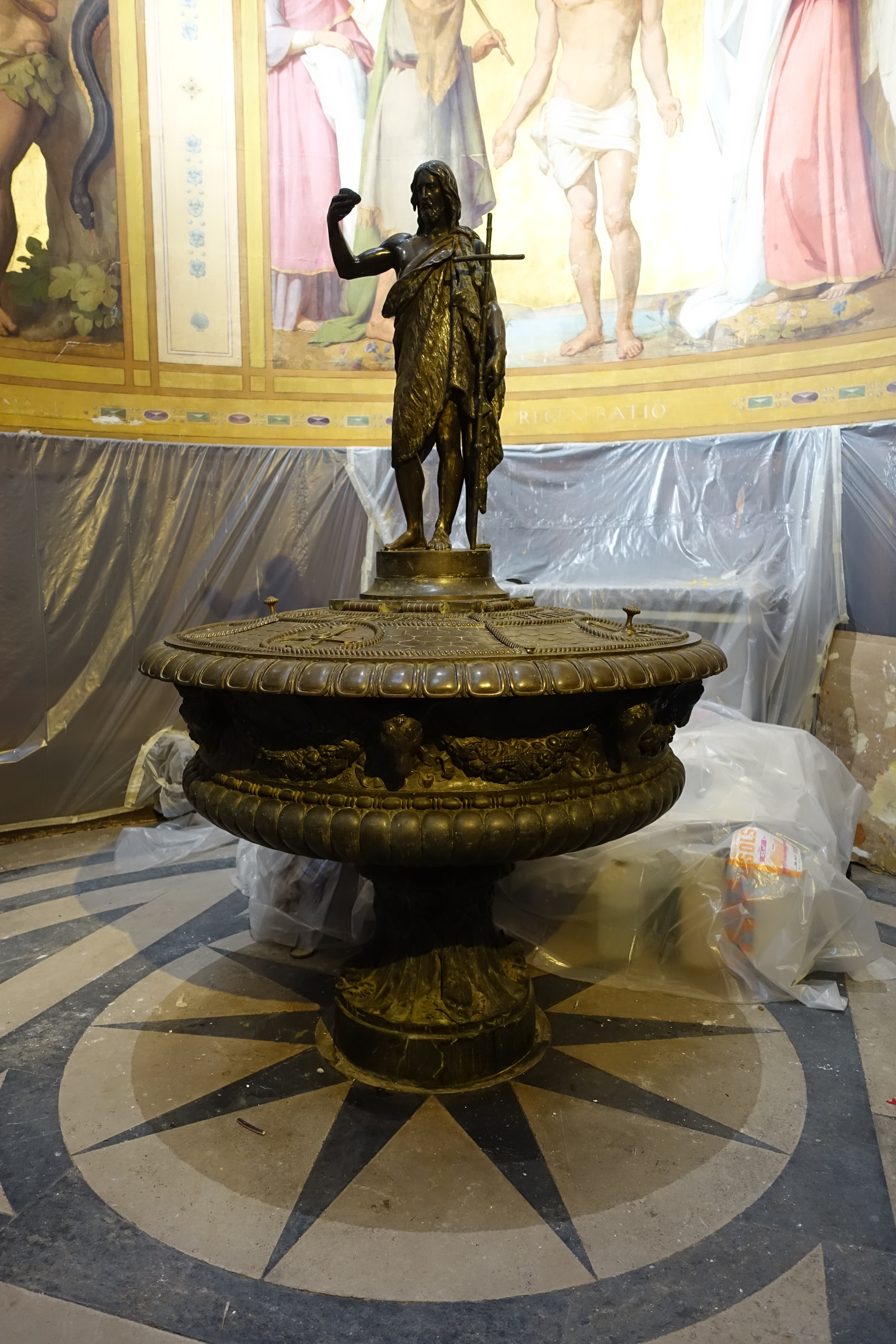
The baptismal font, with figure of John the Baptist

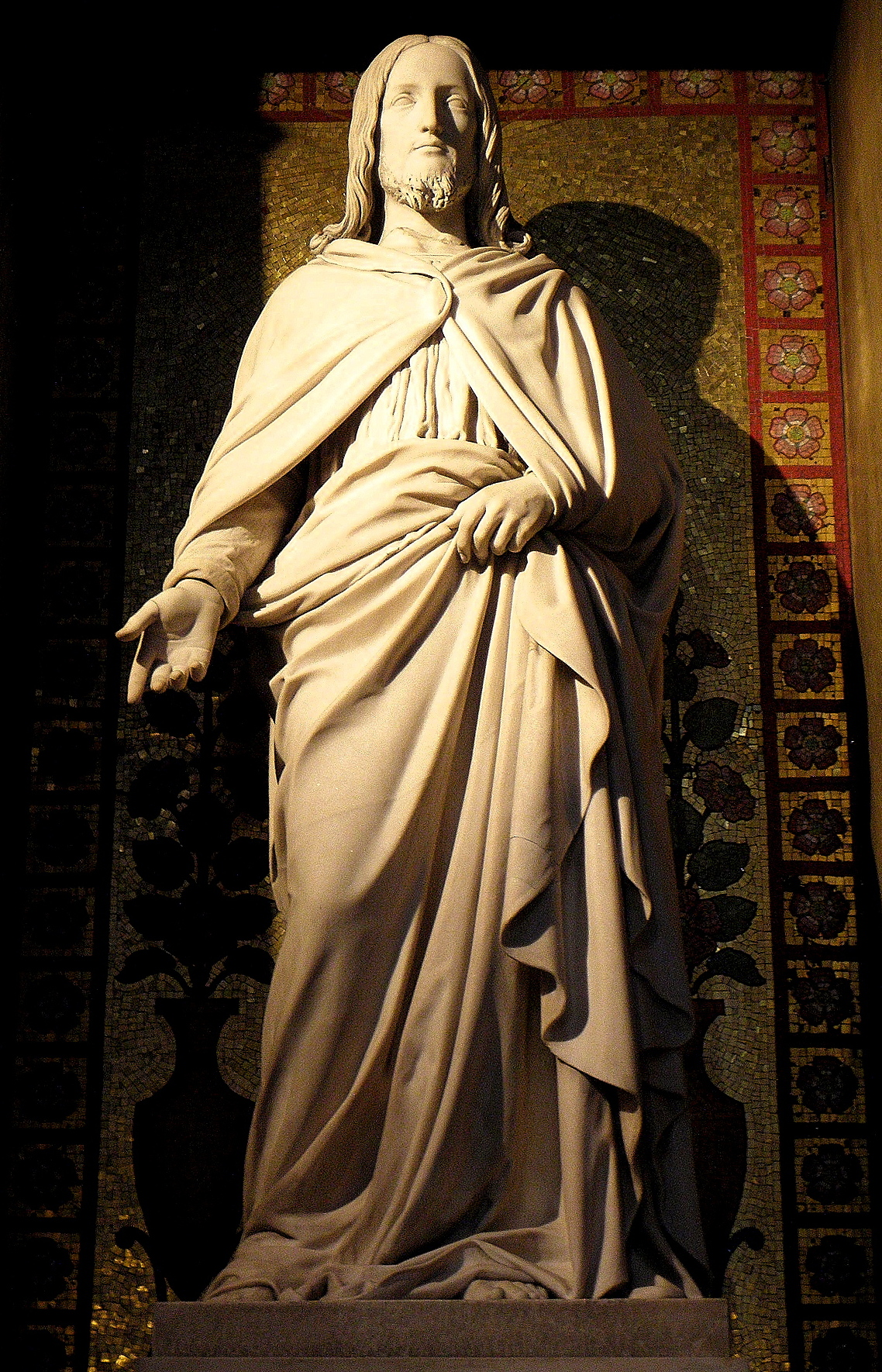
"Christ" by Antoine Desboeufs

== The organs ==
The church has two organs; the grand organ is located on the tribune over the entrance, and fills almost the entire space. The smaller choir organ is located in the choir to the side of the altar.

The grand organ of the tribune was completed in 1838 by Aristide Cavaillé-Coll, who at the time was twenty-eight years old. He was aided by his father and brother Vincent to complete his first organ. Fitting it into the narrow width of the wall was one of this challenges he had to overcome. The later instruments he built included the organs of Notre Dame de Paris, Sacré-Cœur, Paris and La Madeleine, Paris.

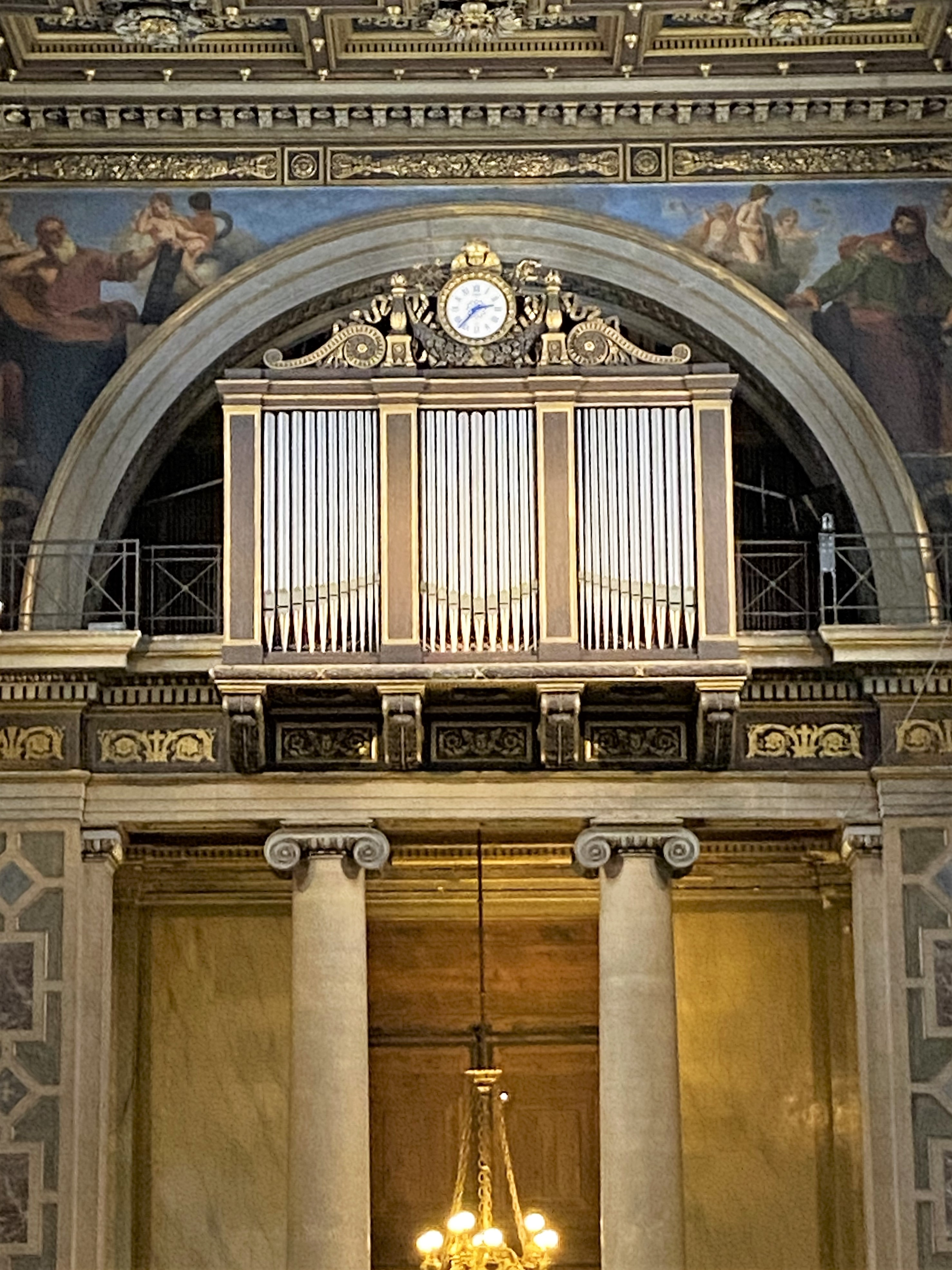
The grand organ on the tribune

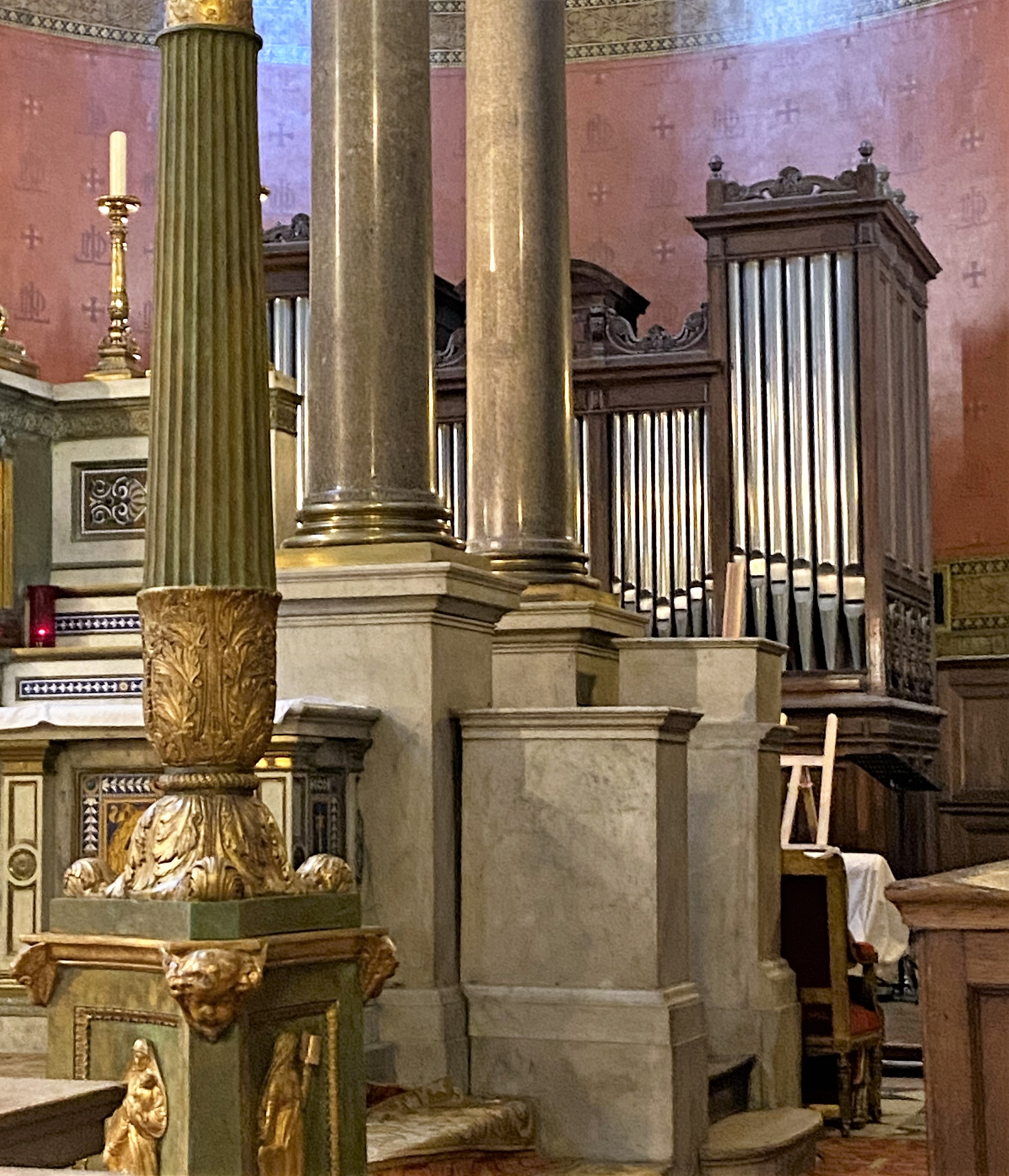
The choir organ

== Bibliography ==
- Dumoulin, Aline; Ardisson, Alexandra; Maingard, Jérôme; Antonello, Murielle; Églises de Paris (2010), Éditions Massin, Issy-Les-Moulineaux, ISBN 978-2-7072-0683-1 (in French)
