= Charles-François Lebœuf =

French sculptor (1792–1865)

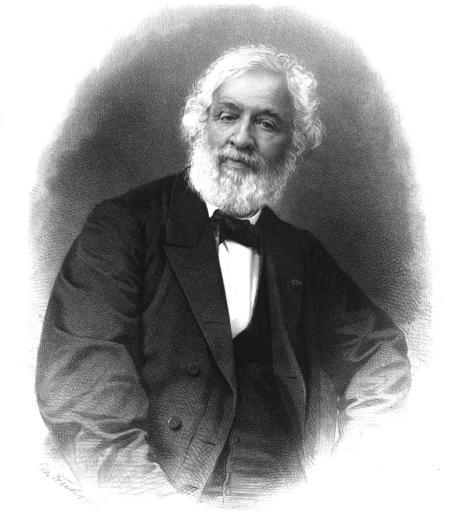
Charles-François Lebœuf

Charles-François Lebœuf (French pronunciation: [ʃaʁl fʁɑ̃swa ləbœf]), called Nanteuil (9 August 1792 – 1 November 1865) was a French sculptor.

== Career ==
Born in Paris, he studied with Pierre Cartellier at the École des Beaux-Arts, winning the Grand Prix de Rome in Sculpture in 1817 with a gypsum figure of Agis, Dying by His Own Arms. The prize included a period of study at the Villa Medici of the French Academy in Rome, where Nanteuil carved the marble statue Dying Eurydice (1822), which he exhibited in Paris in his highly successful debut at the Salon of 1824. The statue is now in the Musée du Louvre. This work later inspired Auguste Clésinger's Woman Bitten by a Snake (1847, Musée d'Orsay).

Nanteuil received many commissions from the French government, including one for a group entitled Commerce and Industry at the French Senate in the Palais du Luxembourg, which was inspired by the first-century sculpture Castor and Pollux. Other commissioned works include a seated statue of Montesquieu (1840, Louis Philippe I's Museum of French History at the Palace of Versailles) and the bronze commemorative statue of General Desaix (1844, located at the Place de Jaude in Clermont-Ferrand). His work was also incorporated into the decorations at the Gare du Nord, the Palais Garnier, and the Palais du Louvre (when it was rebuilt during the Second Empire).

Nanteuil's most important ecclesiastical works are two pediment sculpture groups in stone, Hommage to the Virgin (1830, Church of Notre Dame de Lorette, Paris) and the Glorification of Saint Vincent de Paul (1846, Church of Saint-Vincent-de-Paul, Paris), which reveal the influence of Italian sculpture of the early Renaissance and of sculptures from Aegina and the Parthenon.

Nanteuil died in Paris.

== List of works ==
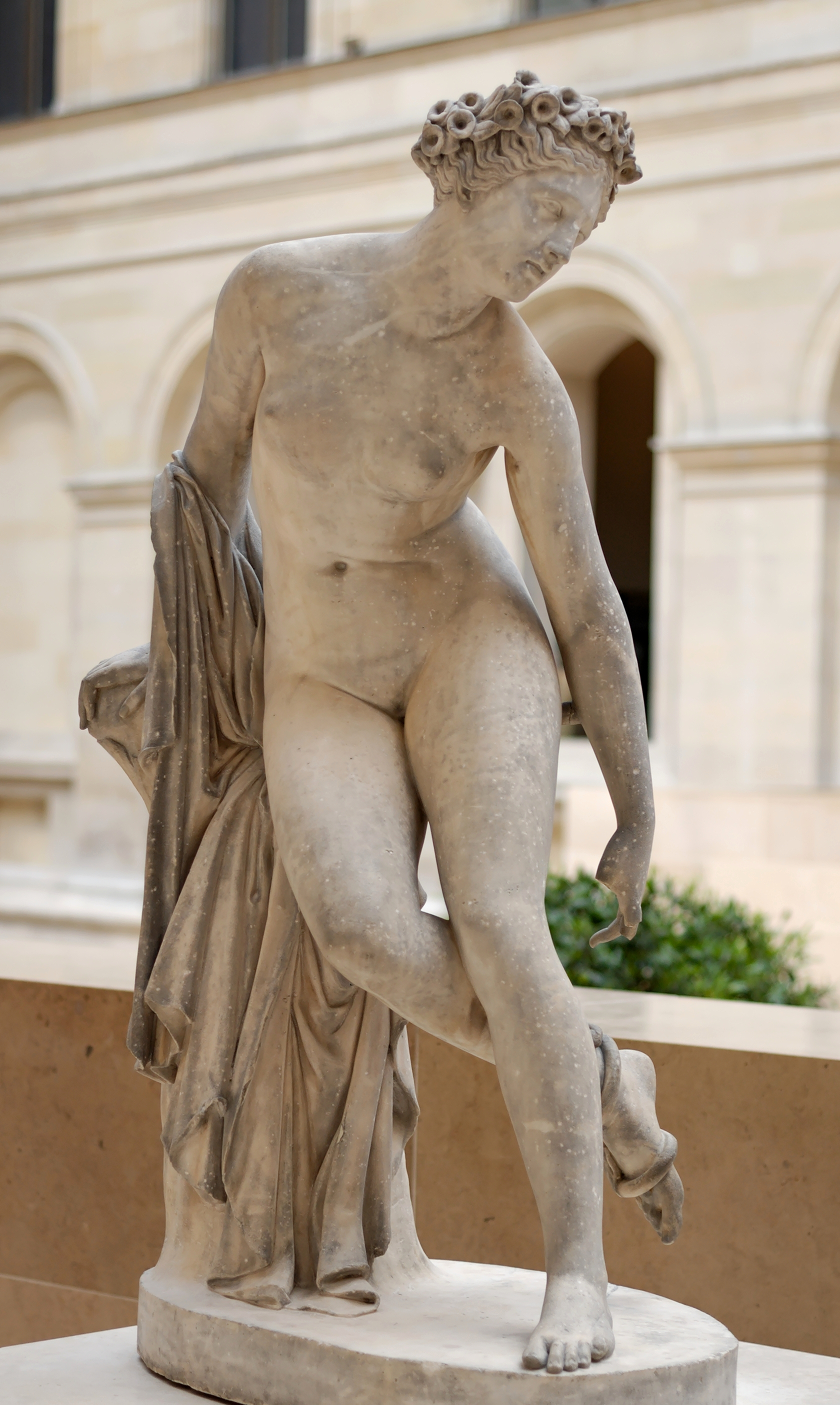
Dying Eurydice, 1822, Musée du Louvre

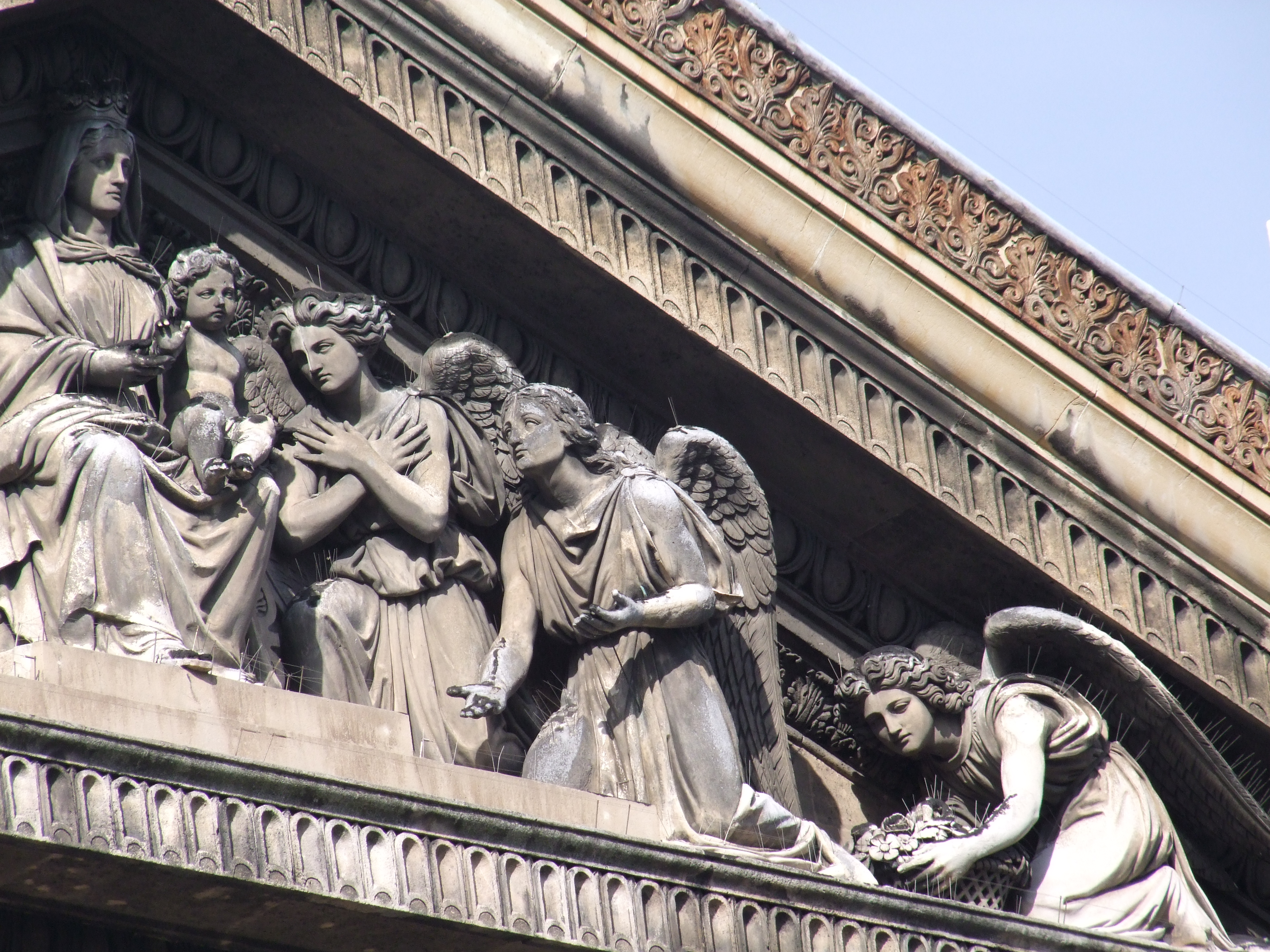
Pediment sculpture, 1830, Notre-Dame-de-Lorette

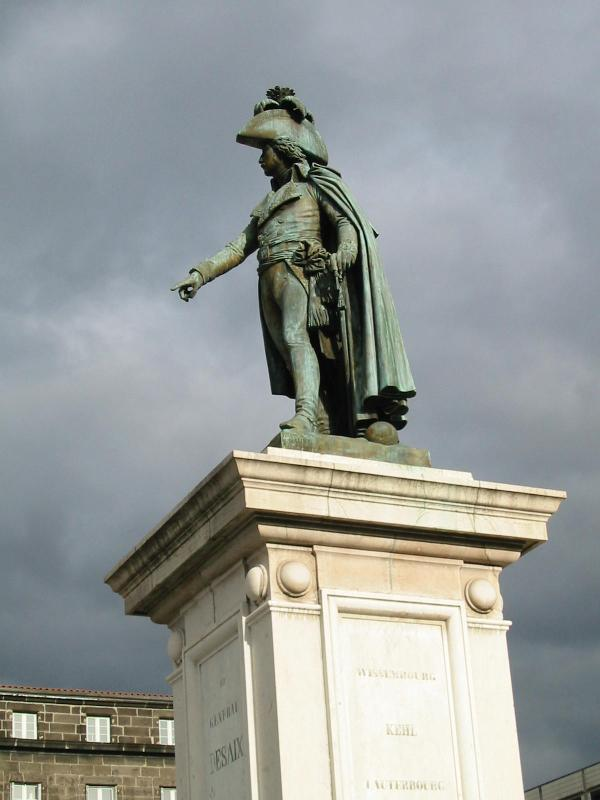
General Desaix, 1848, Place de Jaude in Clermont-Ferrand

- Agis, Dying on His Own Arms (1817), statue, plaster, Paris, École Nationale Supérieure des Beaux-Arts
- Dying Eurydice (1822), statue, marble, Paris, Musée du Louvre
- Portrait of the painter Pierre-Paul Prud'hon (1827), bust, marble, Versailles, Châteaux de Versailles et de Trianon : Salon of 1827, number 1163
- Portrait of the painter Pierre-Paul Prud'hon (1828), bust, marble, Paris, Musée du Louvre
- Pediment sculpture of the Church Notre-Dame-de-Lorette, Paris (1830)
- Alexander fighting (1836), statue, stone, Paris, Jardin des Tuileries, grand bassin rond, le grand carré
- 3 bas-reliefs for the peristyle of the Panthéon de Paris (1837) : The Apotheosis of the heroes who have died for the fatherland, framed by The Sciences and the Arts and The Magistracy.
- Portrait of Charles the Bold, duc de Bourgogne (1433 - 1477) (1838), bust, plaster, Versailles, Châteaux de Versailles et de Trianon
- Portrait of Charlemagne, empereur d'Occident (742 - 814) (1840), larger-than-life size standing statue, marble, Versailles, Châteaux de Versailles et de Trianon
- Portrait of Mathieu Molé, chancellor of France (1584 - 1656) (1840), larger-than-life size standing statue, plaster, Versailles, Châteaux de Versailles et de Trianon
- Charles de Secondat, baron de Montesquieu, man of letters (1689 - 1755) (1840), statue, plaster, Versailles, Châteaux de Versailles et de Trianon
- Death of Orestes (1840), drawing, brown lead, Paris, Musée du Louvre, Département des Arts graphiques
- Portrait of Henri LXI, prince de Reuss-Chlietz, Général de Brigade in the service of France (1784 - 1813) (1841), bust, plaster, Versailles, Châteaux de Versailles et de Trianon
- General Desaix (1848), bronze, Clermont-Ferrand, Place de Jaude
- Glorification of Saint Vincent de Paul, Paris, Church of Saint-Vincent-de-Paul, circa 1850
- Portrait of Jean-Luc-Sébastien-Bonaventure Carbuccia, Général de Brigade (1808 - 1854) (1858), bust, marble, Versailles, Châteaux de Versailles et de Trianon
- Dying Eurydice (1862), statue (replica), bronze, 2nd arrondissement of Paris, Galerie Vivienne
- The town of Beauvais and the town of Lille (1865), stone statues on the facade of the Gare du Nord, Paris
- King Charles X, colossal statue, stone, Versailles, Châteaux de Versailles et de Trianon
- Portrait of Louis-Philippe I, king of the French (1773 - 1830), bust, plaster, Versailles, Châteaux de Versailles et de Trianon
- Portrait of Étienne Jacques Joseph Alexandre Macdonald, Duke of Tarente, Maréchal de l'Empire (1765 - 1840), larger-than-life size standing statue, marble, Versailles, Châteaux de Versailles et de Trianon
