= Catalog of paintings in the Louvre Museum =

The Catalog of paintings in the Louvre Museum lists the painters of the collection of the Louvre Museum as they are catalogued in the Joconde database. The collection contains roughly 5,500 paintings by 1,400 artists born before 1900, and over 500 named artists are French by birth. For painters with more than two works in the collection, or for paintings by unnamed and unknown artists, see the Louvre website. Most artists in the collection are represented with only one or two works, but some artists are represented with many many more; for example artists with over 50 works catalogued are Théodore Chassériau, Jean-Baptiste Camille Corot, Eugène Delacroix, Jean-Auguste-Dominique Ingres, Eustache Le Sueur, Peter Paul Rubens, and Pierre-Henri de Valenciennes.

Per artist a maximum of two artwork IDs is provided with which the artwork can be searched online. The two-letter prefix in the ID indicates the origin of the artwork: MI = Musées Impériaux; RF = République Française; INV = Inventaire Department of Paintings & Department of Sculptures.

There are 22 women artists represented with works in the collection: Marie-Guillemine Benoist, Élise Bruyère, Élisabeth Sophie Chéron, Eugénie Dalton, Madeleine Goblot, Hortense Haudebourt-Lescot, Joséphine Houssay, Angelica Kauffmann, Adèle de Kercado, Adélaïde Labille-Guiard, Judith Leyster, Catherine Lusurier, Constance Mayer, Louise Moillon, Julie Philipault, Rose Marie Pruvost, Adèle Romany, Thea Schleusner, Nanine Vallain, Anne Vallayer-Coster, Élisabeth Louise Vigée Le Brun, and Marie-Denise Villers.

== A ==
- Carlos de Abauza (active 1885–1925), 1 artwork: INV 20658 (ID)
- Niccolò dell'Abbate (1509–1571), 5 artworks: DL 1970–2, RF 1982-24 (IDs)
- Abel de Pujol (1785–1861), 2 artworks: INV 2196, INV 2197 (IDs)
- Ulrich Apt the Elder (c. 1460 – 1522), 1 artwork: INV 1993 (ID)
- Jean Achard (1807–1884), 1 artwork: INV 2200 (ID)
- Willem van Aelst (1627–1683), 2 artworks: INV 20370, RF 666 (IDs)
- Pieter Coecke van Aelst (1502–1550), 1 artwork: INV 2003 (ID)
- Giovanni Agostino da Lodi (1495–1525), 1 artwork: MI 570 (ID)
- Jean Alaux (1786–1864), 4 artworks: INV 20110, INV 20111 (IDs)
- Francesco Albani (1578–1660), 13 artworks: INV 20, INV 20 (IDs)
- Mariotto Albertinelli (1474–1515), 1 artwork: INV 38 (ID)
- Orazio Alfani (1510–1585), 2 artworks: INV 40, INV 234 (IDs)
- Patrick Allan Fraser (1813–1890), 1 artwork: RF 1989-38 (ID)
- Étienne Allegrain (1644–1736 ), 3 artworks: INV 2316, INV 2322 (IDs)
- Pierre Allotte (fl.1771–1791), 1 artwork: RF 1939-22 (ID)
- Pietro di Giovanni D'Ambrogio (c. 1410 – 1449), 3 artworks: RF 1984–157, RF 1984-157 (IDs)
- Pomponio Amidano (1566–1630), 1 artwork: INV 662 (MR 447) (ID)
- Albert André (1869–1954), 1 artwork: RF 1951 22 (ID)
- Ippolito Andreasi (1548–1608), 1 artwork: INV 63 (ID)
- Giuseppe Angeli (1712–1798 ), 1 artwork: INV 66 (ID)
- Filippo Napoletano (c. 1589 Napoli – 1629), 1 artwork: INV 1081 (ID)
- Fra Angelico (1387–1455), 7 artworks: RF 196, INV 314 (IDs)
- Michelangelo Anselmi (c. 1492 – 1556), 1 artwork: INV 67 (ID)
- Eugène Appert (1814–1867), 1 artwork: RF 1993-33 (ID)
- Giuseppe Arcimboldo (1526–1593), 4 artworks: RF 1964–33, RF 1964-32 (IDs)
- Juan de Arellano (1614–1676), 1 artwork: RF 411 (ID)
- Arent Arentsz (1585–1631), 1 artwork: RF 1163 (ID)
- Jacques d'Arthois (1613–1685), 1 artwork: MI 901 (ID)
- Jan Asselijn (1615–1652), 3 artworks: INV 986, INV 985 (IDs)
- Gioacchino Assereto (1600–1649), 1 artwork: RF 1940-3 (ID)
- Etienne Aubry (1745–1781), 2 artworks: RF 1973–7, RF 1715 (IDs)
- Claude Audran the Younger (1639–1684), 1 artwork: MI 298 (ID)
- Joseph Auguste (active 1825–1849), 1 artwork: RF 3630 (ID)
- Jules Robert Auguste (1723–1805), 2 artworks: RF 1948–40, RF 1948-39 (IDs)
- Joseph Aved (1702–1766), 1 artwork: INV 2374 (ID)
- Barent Avercamp (1612–1679), 1 artwork: RF 2854 (ID)
- Étienne Azambre (1859–1933), 1 artwork: RF 1978 30 (ID)

== B ==
- Hans Jurriaensz van Baden (1604–1667 ), 1 artwork: INV 1599 (ID)
- Antonio Badile (1516–1560), 1 artwork: INV 20415 (ID)
- Cornelis de Baellieur (1607–1671), 1 artwork: MI 699 (ID)
- Giovanni Baglione (1566–1643), 1 artwork: RF 1964-28 (ID)
- David Bailly (1584–1657), 1 artwork: RF 792 (ID)
- Ludolf Bakhuizen (1631–1708), 5 artworks: RF 1528, INV 990 (IDs)
- Alesso Baldovinetti (1425–1499), 1 artwork: RF 1112 (ID)
- Giovanni Balducci (1560–after 1631), 1 artwork: INV 20270 (ID)
- Hans Baldung (1484–1545), 1 artwork: RF 2467 (ID)
- Hendrick van Balen (1575–1632), 1 artwork: DL 1973-21 (ID)
- Peder Balke (1804–1887), 26 artworks: INV 1026, INV 1025 (IDs)
- Louis-Pierre Baltard (1764–1846), 1 artwork: INV 2405 (ID)
- Paul Jean Etienne Balze (1815–1884), 1 artwork: INV 20039 (ID)
- Jacopo de' Barbari (c. 1445 – 1516), 1 artwork: RF 2219 (ID)
- Jean Barbault (1718–1762), 3 artworks: RF 1971–17, RF 1971-17 (IDs)
- Jean Jacques François le Barbier (1738–1828), 1 artwork: INV 2413 (ID)
- Dirck Barendsz (1534–1592), 4 artworks: RF 1975 25, RF 1986-51 (IDs)
- A. F. Bargas (1660–1699), 1 artwork: RF 2191 (ID)
- Léon Barillot (1844–1929), 1 artwork: INV 20626 (ID)
- Barnaba da Modena (1361–1383), 1 artwork: RF 1968-4 (ID)
- Henri Baron (1816–1885 ), 3 artworks: RF 3966, RF 3804 (IDs)
- Federico Barocci (1530–1612), 3 artworks: INV 93, MI 315 (IDs)
- Félix Joseph Barrias (1822–1907), 1 artwork: RF 1976-39 (ID)
- François Pierre Barry (1813–1905), 1 artwork: INV 2434 (ID)
- Amadé Barth (1899–1926), 1 artwork: INV 20144 (ID)
- Bertholet Flemalle (1614–1675), 2 artworks: INV 1288, INV 161 (IDs)
- Taddeo di Bartolo (1362–1422), 1 artwork: MI 417 (ID)
- Andrea Solari (c. 1465 – 1524 ), 6 artworks: RF 1978–35, RF 1978-35 (IDs)
- Bartolomeo di Giovanni (1480–1510), 2 artworks: RF 1346, RF 1347 (IDs)
- Bartolomeo Veneto (c. 1480 – c. 1546 ), 5 artworks: RF 1945–9, RF 2485 (IDs)
- Antoine-Louis Barye (1796–1875), 7 artworks: RF 2072, RF 1956-10 (IDs)
- Jacopo Bassano (1510–1592), 5 artworks: INV 429, INV 582 (IDs)
- Girolamo da Ponte (1566–1621), 2 artworks: INV 428, INV 436 (IDs)
- Bartholomeus van Bassen (1590–1652), 1 artwork: INV 2184 (ID)
- Francesco da Ponte (1470–1530), 2 artworks: INV 434, INV 432 (IDs)
- Pompeo Batoni (1708–1787), 3 artworks: RF 1983–47, RF 1981-37 (IDs)
- Lubin Baugin (c. 1610 – 1663), 4 artworks: INV 20596, INV 2436 (IDs)
- Johann Wolfgang Baumgartner (1712–1761), 1 artwork: RF 1996-22 (ID)
- Giuseppe Bazzani (1690–1769), 2 artworks: RF 1991–3, RF 1983-48 (IDs)
- Il Sodoma (1477–1549), 1 artwork: RF 2106 (ID)
- Joseph Beaume (1796–1885), 3 artworks: INV 2451, INV 2449 (IDs)
- Jean de Beaumetz (c. 1335 – 1396), 1 artwork: RF 1967-3 (ID)
- Claudio Francesco Beaumont (1694–1766), 1 artwork: RF 1983-49 (ID)
- William Beechey (1753–1839), 1 artwork: RF 303 (ID)
- Adriaen Cornelisz Beeldemaker (1618–1709), 1 artwork: RF 1938-26 (ID)
- Jan Abrahamsz Beerstraaten (1622–1666), 2 artworks: INV 1030, RF 3715 (IDs)
- Cornelis Pietersz Bega (1620–1664), 2 artworks: RF 2880, INV 1032 (IDs)
- Abraham Begeyn (1637–1697), 1 artwork: INV 1031 (ID)
- Hans Sebald Beham (1500–1550), 1 artwork: INV 1033 (ID)
- A. Belange (active 1575–1625), 1 artwork: RF 2355 (ID)
- Jean-Baptiste Belin de Fontenay (1653–1715 ), 3 artworks: INV 4464, INV 4464 BIS (IDs)
- Hippolyte Bellangé (1800–1866), 2 artworks: INV 2474, INV 2474 (IDs)
- Augustin-Louis Belle (1757–1841), 1 artwork: INV 2497 (ID)
- Clément Belle (1722–1806), 7 artworks: INV 20297 A, INV 20296 A (IDs)
- Henri Bellechose (1415–1440), 1 artwork: MI 674 (ID)
- Jehan Bellegambe (c. 1470 – c. 1535), 1 artwork: MI 817 (ID)
- Jean-Joseph Bellel (1816–1898), 1 artwork: RF 223 (ID)
- Jacopo Bellini (1400–1471), 1 artwork: RF 41 (ID)
- Gentile Bellini (1430–1507), 4 artworks: RF 2039, RF 1970-39 (IDs)
- Giovanni Bellini (1435–1516), 1 artwork: RF 2097 (ID)
- Jean Hilaire Belloc (1786–1866), 1 artwork: RF 703 (ID)
- Andrea Belvedere (1652–1732), 1 artwork: INV 20383 (ID)
- Marco Benefial (1684–1764), 1 artwork: RF 1997-31 (ID)
- Simon Bening (1483–1561), 2 artworks: DL 1973–18, DL 1973-18 (IDs)
- Marie-Guillemine Benoist (1768–1826), 1 artwork: INV 2508 (ID)
- François-Léon Benouville (1821–1859), 3 artworks: RF 1992–3, RF 1972-10 (IDs)
- Achille Benouville (1815–1891), 2 artworks: INV 20588, RF 1961-16 (IDs)
- Benozzo Gozzoli (1420–1497), 1 artwork: INV 104 (ID)
- Ambrosius Benson (1484–1550), 3 artworks: RF 2821, RF 2821 (IDs)
- Pietro Benvenuti (1769–1844), 1 artwork: MI 603 (ID)
- Benvenuto Tisi (c. 1481 – 1559 ), 3 artworks: INV 695, INV 694 (IDs)
- Nicolaes Pieterszoon Berchem (1620–1683), 8 artworks: INV 1037, INV 1038 (IDs)
- Auguste Charles La Berge (1807–1842), 1 artwork: MI 36 (ID)
- Dirck van der Bergen (1645–1689), 1 artwork: INV 1035 (ID)
- Joseph Berger (1798–1870), 1 artwork: RF 1939-26 (ID)
- Pierre-Nolasque Bergeret (1782–1863), 1 artwork: INV 2513 (ID)
- Ambrogio Bergognone (c. 1453 – 1523), 3 artworks: RF 1164, RF 24 (IDs)
- Antoine Berjon (1754–1843), 1 artwork: RF 1974-10 (ID)
- Gerrit Adriaenszoon Berckheyde (1638–1698), 1 artwork: RF 2341 (ID)
- Nicasius Bernaerts (1620–1678), 17 artworks: INV 4063, INV 1667 (IDs)
- Bernardo Cavallino (1616–1656), 1 artwork: RF 1983-30 (ID)
- Bernardino de' Conti (1450–1525), 1 artwork: RF 2086 (ID)
- Louis Beroud (1852–1930), 7 artworks: DL 1978–3, RF 1990-9 (IDs)
- Pietro da Cortona (1596–1669), 5 artworks: INV 106, INV 105 (IDs)
- Jean-Simon Berthélemy (1743–1811), 2 artworks: RF 1974–8, RF 1974-8 (IDs)
- Nicolas Bertin (1668–1736), 3 artworks: RF 1980–4, INV 2536 (IDs)
- Jean-Victor Bertin (1767–1842), 1 artwork: RF 1951-25 (ID)
- Jacopo Bertoia (1544–1574 ), 1 artwork: RF 1995 8 (ID)
- Balthasar Beschey (1708–1776), 1 artwork: INV 1049 (ID)
- Joachim Beuckelaer (1533–1574), 2 artworks: RF 1997–6, RF 2659 (IDs)
- Abraham van Beijeren (1620–1690), 4 artworks: RF 1995–15, RF 1181 (IDs)
- Biagio d'Antonio (1446–1516 ), 2 artworks: INV 296, MI 518 (IDs)
- Pietro Bianchi (painter) (1694–1740 ), 1 artwork: RF 1997-28 (ID)
- François Auguste Biard (1799–1882 ), 3 artworks: INV 2573, INV 2578 (IDs)
- Bicci di Lorenzo (1373–1452), 1 artwork: RF 2087 (ID)
- Jean-Joseph-Xavier Bidauld (1758–1846), 4 artworks: INV 2580, INV 2601 (IDs)
- François Victor Eloi Biennourry (1823–1893), 13 artworks: INV 20855, RF 1993-29 H (IDs)
- Franciabigio (1482–1525), 1 artwork: INV 517 (ID)
- Louis Marc Antoine Bilcoq (1755–1838), 1 artwork: RF 1998-18 (ID)
- Giovanni Biliverti (1576–1644 ), 1 artwork: RF 1986 65 (ID)
- Alexandre le Blanc (1793–1866), 2 artworks: INV 5735, INV 5741 (IDs)
- Jacques Blanchard (1600–1638), 3 artworks: INV 2606, RF 2317 (IDs)
- Jean Blanchard (1602–1665), 1 artwork: RF 1947-20 (ID)
- Théophile Blanchard (1820–1849), 1 artwork: INV 2621 (ID)
- Thomas Blanchet (1614–1689), 1 artwork: RF 1985–88 (ID)
- Abraham Bloemaert (1564–1651), 3 artworks: RF 1976–14, INV 1053 (IDs)
- Peter van Bloemen (1657–1720), 1 artwork: INV 2178 (ID)
- Anthonie van Montfoort (1533–1583), 1 artwork: RF 1989-10 (ID)
- Merry-Joseph Blondel (1781–1853), 8 artworks: INV 2625, INV 2626 BIS (IDs)
- Jacopo Boateri ( c.1480-c.1540), 1 artwork: MI 565 (ID)
- Boccaccio Boccaccino (before 1466–1525 ), 1 artwork: MI 207 (ID)
- Guillaume Bodinier (1795–1872), 1 artwork: INV 2673 (ID)
- Pieter Boel (1626–1673), 17 artworks: INV 4006, INV 3994 (IDs)
- German von Bohn (1812–1899), 1 artwork: INV 20276 (ID)
- Louis-Léopold Boilly (1761–1845), 18 artworks: RF 2002–16, INV 20116 (IDs)
- Félix Boisselier (1776–1811), 1 artwork: RF 1975-24 (ID)
- Ferdinand Bol (1616–1680), 6 artworks: INV 1062, INV 1061 (IDs)
- Giovanni Antonio Boltraffio (1467–1516 ), 1 artwork: INV 103 (ID)
- Giotto (1266–1337), 2 artworks: MI 357, MI 357 (IDs)
- Jules Georges Bondoux (?-1920), 8 artworks: RF 3690, RF 3678 (IDs)
- Matteo Bonechi (1669–1756), 1 artwork: INV 20021 (ID)
- Ignace-François Bonhommé (1809–1881), 1 artwork: RF 1758 (ID)
- Richard Parkes Bonington (1802–1828), 7 artworks: RF 1284, RF 2558 (IDs)
- Léon Bonnat (1833–1922 ), 3 artworks: RF 2683, RF 1972-42 (IDs)
- Jean-Claude Bonnefond (1796–1860), 1 artwork: INV 2695 (ID)
- Féréol Bonnemaison (1767–1827), 1 artwork: RF 1941-1 (ID)
- Carlo Bononi (1569–1632), 1 artwork: INV 121 (ID)
- Pietro Paolo Bonzi (c. 1576 – 1636 ), 1 artwork: INV 124 (ID)
- Gerard ter Borch (1617–1681), 7 artworks: INV 1899, INV 1899 (IDs)
- Paris Bordone (1500–1571), 3 artworks: RF 1474, INV 126 (IDs)
- Orazio Borgianni (1574–1616), 1 artwork: RF 1983-50 (ID)
- Juan de Borgoña (c. 1495 – 1536 ), 1 artwork: RF 1993-19 (ID)
- Vladimir Borovikovsky (1757–1825), 3 artworks: RF 2164, RF 1962-5 (IDs)
- Hieronymus Bosch (1450–1516), 1 artwork: RF 2218 (ID)
- Pieter van den Bosch (1612–1673), 1 artwork: INV 1842 (ID)
- Thomas Willeboirts Bosschaert (1613–1654), 1 artwork: RF 1938 28 (ID)
- Ambrosius Bosschaert (1573–1621), 1 artwork: RF 1984-150 (ID)
- Jan Dirksz Both (1618–1652), 2 artworks: INV 1065, INV 1066 (IDs)
- Giuseppe Bottani (1717–1784), 1 artwork: RF 1997-19 (ID)
- Sandro Botticelli (1444–1510), 9 artworks: RF 2099, MI 546 (IDs)
- Francesco Botticini (b.1446–1497), 2 artworks: RF 2082, INV 590 (IDs)
- François Boucher (1703–1770), 28 artworks: RF 1988–16, RF 1983-72 (IDs)
- François Bouchot (1800–1842), 1 artwork: RF 1994-9 (ID)
- Peter van Boucle (1610–1673), 2 artworks: INV 1853, INV 1852 (IDs)
- Victor Boucquet (1619–1677), 1 artwork: RF 1155 (ID)
- Eugène Boudin (1824–1898), 3 artworks: RF 3461, RF 1961-31 (IDs)
- Etienne Bouhot (1780–1862), 3 artworks: DL 1989–2, RF 1978-20 (IDs)
- Clément Boulanger (1805–1842), 1 artwork: INV 20560 (ID)
- Louis Boulanger (1806–1867), 3 artworks: RF 2512, RF 1180 (IDs)
- Bon Boullogne (1649–1717), 6 artworks: INV 2766, INV 8608 (IDs)
- Louis Boullogne (1609–1674), 4 artworks: INV 8548, RF 1986-61 (IDs)
- Michel Honoré Bounieu (1740–1814), 1 artwork: MI 1047 (ID)
- Sébastien Bourdon (1616–1671), 15 artworks: RF 1983–73, RF 1979-57 (IDs)
- Pieter Bout (1630–1700), 2 artworks: RF 3714, RF 3714 (IDs)
- Louis-Maurice Boutet de Monvel (1850–1913), 1 artwork: RF 1974-14 (ID)
- Dieric Bouts (1415–1475), 5 artworks: INV 1994, INV 1986 (IDs)
- Jacques Boyer (17th), 2 artworks: MI 1094, MI 1094 (IDs)
- Carlo Braccesco (1478–1501), 1 artwork: INV 1410 (ID)
- Ferdinand de Braekeleer the Elder (1792–1883), 1 artwork: RF 1991-16 (ID)
- Richard Brakenburgh (1650–1702), 1 artwork: RF 3708 (ID)
- Leonaert Bramer (1596–1674), 1 artwork: RF 1989-7 (ID)
- Jacques Émile Édouard Brandon (1831–1897), 1 artwork: RF 1116 (ID)
- Georges Braque (1882–1963), 3 artworks: INV 20378, INV 20379 (IDs)
- Jacques Raymond Brascassat (1804–1867), 2 artworks: INV 2849, INV 20047 (IDs)
- Salomon de Bray (1597–1664), 1 artwork: RF 1995-3 (ID)
- Jan de Bray (1627–1697), 1 artwork: RF 1760 (ID)
- Ludovico Brea (c. 1450 – c. 1523), 1 artwork: RF 1982-77 (ID)
- Jan Frans van Bredael (1625–1682), 1 artwork: INV 1072 (ID)
- Adam van Breen (1585–1642), 1 artwork: RF 1738 (ID)
- Bartholomeus Breenbergh (1598–1657), 1 artwork: RF 1937 4 (ID)
- Quirijn van Brekelenkam (1622–1670), 2 artworks: MI 939, MI 907 (IDs)
- Karel Breydel (1678–1733), 1 artwork: MI 801 (ID)
- Paul Bril (1554–1626), 12 artworks: INV 1111, DL 1970-4; ALGER 3814 (IDs)
- Jean Broc (1771–1850), 1 artwork: RF 27 (ID)
- Bronzino (1503–1572), 3 artworks: RF 1348, INV 131 (IDs)
- Lazare Bruandet (1755–1804), 2 artworks: RF 1998–25, RF 1998-16 (IDs)
- Abraham Brueghel (1631–1690), 1 artwork: RF 1949-4 (ID)
- Jan Brueghel the Elder (1568–1624), 9 artworks: RF 1938 98, RF 1938 98 (IDs)
- Jan Brueghel the Younger (1601–1678), 1 artwork: INV 1120 (ID)
- Pieter Bruegel the Elder (1526–1569), 1 artwork: RF 730 (ID)
- Pieter Brueghel the Younger (1564–1638), 2 artworks: RF 1973–37, RF 829 (IDs)
- Charles Le Brun (1619–1690), 31 artworks: RF 1998–2, RF 1990-10 (IDs)
- Alexandre Jean-Baptiste Brun (1853–1941), 1 artwork: RF 1987 29 (ID)
- Félice Brusasorci (1539–1605), 1 artwork: INV 567 (ID)
- Élise Bruyère (1776–1847), 1 artwork: INV 3086 (ID)
- Barthel Bruyn the Elder (1493–1553), 2 artworks: RF 1771, RF 1772 (IDs)
- Giuliano Bugiardini (1475–1554), 1 artwork: INV 874 (ID)
- Giovanni Antonio Burrini (1656–1727), 2 artworks: INV 687, RF 1983-51 (IDs)
- Giovanni Cariani (c. 1485 – 1547 ), 2 artworks: INV 101, INV 102 (IDs)
- Giovanni Battista Busiri (1698–1757 ), 2 artworks: RF 2584, RF 2583 (IDs)

== C ==
- Alexandre Cabanel (1823–1889), 2 artworks: RF 1998–3, INV 20339 (IDs)
- Nicolas Louis Cabat (1812–1893), 3 artworks: INV 3095, INV 3094 (IDs)
- Giuseppe Cades (1750–1799), 2 artworks: RF 1980–191, RF 1980-192 (IDs)
- Mattia Preti (1613–1699), 2 artworks: RF 1954–19, RF 1954-19 (IDs)
- Jan van Calcar (1499–1546), 1 artwork: INV 134 (ID)
- Giuseppe Caletti (c. 1600 – c. 1660), 1 artwork: INV 817 BIS (ID)
- Charles-Émile-Callande de Champmartin (1797–1883), 5 artworks: INV 3188, RF 37 (IDs)
- Antoine-François Callet (1741–1823), 6 artworks: INV 3099, MI 1028 (IDs)
- Edward Calvert (painter) (1799–1883), 1 artwork: RF 768 (ID)
- Alexandre-François Caminade (1789–1862), 1 artwork: RF 1996-5 (ID)
- Antonio Campi (1523–1587), 1 artwork: RF 1985-2 (ID)
- Canaletto (1697–1768), 3 artworks: RF 1961–33, RF 1961-32 (IDs)
- Peter Candid (1548–1628), 1 artwork: INV 516 (ID)
- Alonso Cano (1601–1667 ), 2 artworks: RF 1977–3, RF 1977-2 (IDs)
- Simone Cantarini (1612–1648), 2 artworks: INV 175, INV 176 (IDs)
- Caravaggio (1571–1610), 4 artworks: INV 174, INV 57 (IDs)
- Vincenzo Carducci (1576–1638 ), 6 artworks: RF 1980–36, RF 1980-41 (IDs)
- Antoine Caron (1521–1599), 3 artworks: RF 1938–101, RF 1938-101 (IDs)
- Giovanni Francesco Caroto (c. 1480 – c. 1555 ), 1 artwork: RF 2327 (ID)
- Jean-Baptiste Carpeaux (1827–1875), 1 artwork: RF 1599 (ID)
- Giulio Carpioni (1613–1678), 2 artworks: RF 1983–52, RF 1983-53 (IDs)
- Agostino Carracci (1557–1602), 1 artwork: INV 182 (ID)
- Annibale Carracci (1560–1609), 12 artworks: INV 213, INV 213 (IDs)
- Antonio Marziale Carracci (c. 1583 – 1618 ), 1 artwork: INV 230 (ID)
- Ludovico Carracci (1555–1619), 2 artworks: INV 186, INV 184 (IDs)
- Juan Carreño de Miranda (1614–1685 ), 1 artwork: RF 1964-36 (ID)
- Pontormo (1494–1556), 2 artworks: INV 233, INV 232 (IDs)
- Andrea Casali (1705–1764), 1 artwork: RF 1997-27 (ID)
- Francesco Giuseppe Casanova (1727–1803), 7 artworks: MI 1064, MI 1030 (IDs)
- Jacopo del Casentino (1279–1358), 1 artwork: RF 1980-190 (ID)
- Pieter Casteels III (1684–1749 ), 2 artworks: INV 1300 TER, INV 1300 BIS (IDs)
- Clemente Castelli (1870–1959), 2 artworks: RF 1948–31, INV 20520 (IDs)
- Valerio Castello (1624–1659), 1 artwork: MI 863 (ID)
- Pierre de Castelnau (active 1850–1875), 2 artworks: RF 1957–5, INV 20020 (IDs)
- Giuseppe Castiglione (Jesuit) (1688–1766), 1 artwork: RF 3734 (ID)
- Giovanni Benedetto Castiglione (1609–1664), 4 artworks: RF 1941–2, INV 241 (IDs)
- Siebe Johannes ten Cate (1858–1908), 2 artworks: RF 1988–21, RF 1988-20 (IDs)
- Vincenzo Catena (c. 1470 – 1531 ), 1 artwork: RF 2098 (ID)
- Louis de Caullery (1580–1621), 1 artwork: MI 828 (ID)
- Bartolomeo Cavarozzi (c. 1590 – 1625), 1 artwork: RF 1937-6 (ID)
- Romain Cazes (1810–1881), 2 artworks: RF 1988–4, INV 3032 (IDs)
- Pierre-Jacques Cazes (1676–1754), 3 artworks: INV 3176, INV 3177 (IDs)
- Mateo Cerezo (1637–1666), 1 artwork: MI 888 (ID)
- Giovanni Domenico Cerrini (1609–1681), 1 artwork: INV 202 (ID)
- Giuseppe Cesari (1568–1640), 3 artworks: INV 8559, INV 250 (IDs)
- Paul Cézanne (1839–1906), 1 artwork: RF 1961-34 (ID)
- Simon de Châlons (1506–1568), 1 artwork: RF 1183 (ID)
- Jean Baptiste de Champaigne (1631–1680), 5 artworks: INV 1172, RF 1986-62 (IDs)
- Philippe de Champaigne (1602–1673), 29 artworks: INV 1130, INV 1129 (IDs)
- Jean Changenet (1486–1493), 1 artwork: INV 1992 (ID)
- Georges de la Chappelle (1638–1648), 1 artwork: RF 1955-1 (ID)
- Jean-Baptiste-Siméon Chardin (1699–1779), 33 artworks: RF 1985–10, RF 1979-55 (IDs)
- Nicolas Toussaint Charlet (1792–1845 ), 2 artworks: RF 1606, RF 316 (IDs)
- Théodore Chassériau (1819–1856), 54 artworks: RF 1986–63, RF 3933 (IDs)
- Gustave Adolphe Chassevent-Bacques (1818–1901), 1 artwork: INV 20387 (ID)
- Claude-Louis Châtelet (1753–1795), 2 artworks: INV 3220, INV 3219 (IDs)
- Pierre Charles Chauffer, 1 artwork: MI 339 (ID)
- Auguste Chavard (1810–1885), 1 artwork: RF 3842 (ID)
- Victor Joseph Chavet (1822–1908), 1 artwork: RF 3083 (ID)
- Paul Chenavard (1807–1895), 1 artwork: INV 20635 (ID)
- Élisabeth Sophie Chéron (1648–1711), 2 artworks: MV 3678; INV 3229; MR 1576, INV 3239 (IDs)
- Paul Chevandier de Valdrome (1817–1877), 1 artwork: RF 1987-4 (ID)
- Giuseppe Bartolomeo Chiari (1654–1727), 1 artwork: RF 1997-35 (ID)
- Jacopo Da Empoli (c. 1554 – 1640 ), 1 artwork: INV 251 (ID)
- Pseudo-Félix Chrestien (active 1535–1550), 1 artwork: RF 1971-18 (ID)
- Petrus Christus (1415–1476), 1 artwork: RF 1951-45 (ID)
- Sil'vestr Fedosyevich Shchedrin (1791–1830), 1 artwork: RF 1989-71 (ID)
- Édouard Cibot (1799–1877), 1 artwork: MI 38 (ID)
- Cimabue (1240–1302), 1 artwork: INV 254 (ID)
- Bartolomeo Montagna (c. 1450 – 1523 ), 1 artwork: MI 567 (ID)
- Pieter Claesz (1597–1660), 2 artworks: RF 242, RF 1939-11 (IDs)
- Hendrick de Clerck (1570–1630), 2 artworks: RF 1945–17, MI 960 (IDs)
- Joos van Cleve (1485–1541), 9 artworks: INV 2068, 78 LR (IDs)
- Jean Clouet (1480–1541), 2 artworks: MI 832, INV 3256 (IDs)
- François Clouet (c. 1510 – 1572), 14 artworks: RF 1719, INV 3271 (IDs)
- Leonardo Coccorante (1680–1750), 1 artwork: RF 1994-14 (ID)
- Léon Matthieu Cochereau (1793–1817), 1 artwork: INV 3280 (ID)
- Viviano Codazzi (1604–1670), 2 artworks: INV 8971, INV 8970 (IDs)
- Pieter Codde (1599–1678), 1 artwork: RF 612 (ID)
- Léon Cogniet (1794–1800), 4 artworks: RF 1986–64, INV 3287 (IDs)
- Gillis Coignet (1542–1599), 1 artwork: INV 20342 (ID)
- Jules Coignet (1798–1860), 1 artwork: RF 2974 (ID)
- Alphonse Colas (1818–1887), 1 artwork: RF 1979-24; INV 20757 (ID)
- Thomas Cole (1801–1848), 1 artwork: RF 1975-9 (ID)
- Alexandre-Marie Colin (1798–1873), 1 artwork: RF 1975-21 (ID)
- Christian Marie Colin de la Biochaye (1750–1813), 1 artwork: RF 1998-15 (ID)
- Francisco Collantes (1599–1656), 1 artwork: INV 924 (ID)
- Hyacinthe Collin de Vermont (1693–1761), 1 artwork: RF 1997-14 (ID)
- Nicolas Colombel (1644–1717), 1 artwork: INV 3317 (ID)
- Guillaume-François Colson (1785–1850), 1 artwork: RF 2660 (ID)
- Scipione Compagno (1624), 1 artwork: RF 1941-12 (ID)
- Sebastiano Conca (1680–1764), 3 artworks: RF 1997–32, RF 1983-54 (IDs)
- Cima da Conegliano (c. 1459 – 1517/18), 2 artworks: RF 2100, INV 253 (IDs)
- Jan van Coninxloo (1489–1565), 1 artwork: INV 1984 (ID)
- John Constable (1776–1837), 5 artworks: RF 1937–23, RF 1952-25 (IDs)
- Adriaen Coorte (1660–1707), 2 artworks: RF 1970–54, RF 1970-53 (IDs)
- Gonzales Coques (1614–1683), 1 artwork: RF 290 (ID)
- Michel Corneille the Younger (1642–1708), 2 artworks: INV 6680, INV 6680 (IDs)
- Cornelis van Haarlem (1562–1637), 2 artworks: RF 1983–25, RF 1983–91 (IDs)
- Sébastien-Melchior Cornu (1804–1870), 1 artwork: INV 20571 (ID)
- Henri Coroënne (1822–1909), 1 artwork: RF 1994-11 (ID)
- Jean-Baptiste-Camille Corot (1796–1875), 106 artworks: RF 1980–194, RF 1997-39 (IDs)
- Antonio da Correggio (1489–1534), 5 artworks: INV 613, INV 5927 (IDs)
- Piero di Cosimo (1462–1521), 2 artworks: RF 200, INV 817 (IDs)
- Jan Cossiers (1600–1670), 1 artwork: RF 1994-20 (ID)
- Simon Cossiers (active 1625–1650), 1 artwork: RF 1166 (ID)
- Lorenzo Costa (1460–1535), 1 artwork: INV 255 (ID)
- Colijn de Coter (1450–1532), 2 artworks: RF 1482, RF 534 (IDs)
- Félix Cottrau (1799–1852), 1 artwork: INV 20561 (ID)
- Auguste Couder (1790–1873), 4 artworks: MM 40 47 9297; DL 1978–1, INV 3378 (IDs)
- Jean Alexandre Couder (1808–1879), 1 artwork: RF 1986-8 (ID)
- Marie Philippe Coupin de la Couperie (1773–1851), 1 artwork: RF 1994-22 (ID)
- Joseph-Désiré Court (1797–1865), 3 artworks: RF 1947–26, INV 20592 (IDs)
- Jacques Courtois (1621–1676), 6 artworks: INV 3444, RF 540 (IDs)
- Jean Cousin the Elder (1490–1570), 1 artwork: INV 3445 (ID)
- Thomas Couture (1815–1879), 3 artworks: RF 1961–36, RF 1699 (IDs)
- Christiaen van Couwenbergh (1604–1667), 1 artwork: RF 3776 (ID)
- Noël Coypel (1628–1707), 13 artworks: MI 335, INV 3527 (IDs)
- Antoine Coypel (1661–1722), 12 artworks: INV 3503, INV 3546 (IDs)
- Charles-Antoine Coypel (1694–1752), 8 artworks: RF 1968–5, INV 3561 (IDs)
- Joos van Craesbeeck (1605-ca1659), 5 artworks: MI 1254, MI 906 (IDs)
- Lucas Cranach the Elder (1472–1553), 6 artworks: RF 1767, RF 1767 (IDs)
- John Cranch (1751–1821), 1 artwork: RF 1991-17 (ID)
- Caspar de Crayer (1582–1669), 2 artworks: MI 337, INV 1186 (IDs)
- Lorenzo di Credi (1459–1537), 3 artworks: MI 597, MI 597 (IDs)
- Crepin, 2 artworks: INV 3600, INV 3599 (IDs)
- Giuseppe Crespi (1665–1747), 2 artworks: RF 1970–40, INV 259 (IDs)
- Donato Creti (1671–1749), 2 artworks: RF 1983–55, RF 1983-56 (IDs)
- Carlo Crivelli (1430/35-1495), 2 artworks: MI 489, MI 290 (IDs)
- Simone dei Crocifissi (1354–1399), 1 artwork: DL 1973-15 (ID)
- Adriaen van Cronenburg (1540–1603), 1 artwork: MI 819 (ID)
- Pieter van der Croos (1609–1701 ), 1 artwork: RF 3706 (ID)
- Charles Cuisin (1815–1859), 1 artwork: RF 1996-17 (ID)
- Aelbert Cuyp (1620–1691), 6 artworks: INV 1190, INV 1191 (IDs)
- Benjamin Gerritsz Cuyp (1612–1652), 1 artwork: RF 1942-6 (ID)

== D ==
- Leonardo da Vinci (1452–1519), 8 artworks: RF 198, INV 786 (IDs)
- Richard Dadd (1817–1886), 1 artwork: RF 1997-12 (ID)
- Bernardo Daddi (c. 1280 – 1348), 2 artworks: MI 393, MI 393 (IDs)
- Jan Frans van Dael (1764–1840), 1 artwork: INV 1196 (ID)
- Louis Jacques Mandé Daguerre (1787–1851 ), 1 artwork: INV 3636 (ID)
- Cornelis van Dalem (1530–1576), 1 artwork: RF 2217 (ID)
- Théodore Caruelle d'Aligny (1798–1871), 4 artworks: RF 1951–8, INV 2305 (IDs)
- Eugénie Dalton (1802–1859), 1 artwork: INV 3638 (ID)
- Florentin Damoiselet (1644–1690), 1 artwork: INV 3640 (ID)
- Michel François Dandre Bardon (1700–1783), 2 artworks: RF 1997–37, RF 1972-12 (IDs)
- Henri-Pierre Danloux (1753–1809), 5 artworks: RF 1987–15, RF 1987-15 (IDs)
- Charles-François Daubigny (1817–1878 ), 17 artworks: RF 1372, RF 1993-26 (IDs)
- Adrien Dauzats (1804–1868), 5 artworks: INV 20584, INV 3686 (IDs)
- Gerard David (1460–1523), 3 artworks: RF 2228, RF 588 (IDs)
- Jacques-Louis David (1748–1825), 34 artworks: RF 1997–5, RF 2061 (IDs)
- Jacques-Louis David (1748–1825), 34 artworks: INV 3708, RF 2061 (IDs)
- Bonaventure de Bar (1700–1729), 1 artwork: INV 2411 (ID)
- Édouard Debat-Ponsan (1847–1913), 1 artwork: RF 2797 (ID)
- Philibert-Louis Debucourt (1765–1832), 2 artworks: RF 1961–37, RF 1937 (IDs)
- Henri Decaisne (1799–1852), 1 artwork: INV 3759 (ID)
- Alexandre-Gabriel Decamps (1803–1860), 26 artworks: RF 1389, RF 1811 (IDs)
- Cornelis Gerritsz Decker (1618–1678), 1 artwork: INV 1201 (ID)
- François-Louis Dejuinne (1786–1844), 1 artwork: RF 2004-6 (ID)
- Eugène Delacroix (1798–1863), 55 artworks: RF 1979–46, RF 1942-14 (IDs)
- Henri-Horace Roland Delaporte (c. 1724 – 1793), 4 artworks: RF 1982–78, RF 1979-1 (IDs)
- Paul Delaroche (1797–1856 ), 9 artworks: RF 1998–1, RF 1982-75 (IDs)
- Georges de La Tour (1593–1652), 6 artworks: RF 1988–15, RF 1979-53 (IDs)
- Dirk van Delen (1605–1671), 1 artwork: INV 1203 (ID)
- Jean-Louis Demarne (1752–1829), 3 artworks: INV 6441, INV 6440 (IDs)
- Pieter de Neyn (1597–1638), 1 artwork: RF 1167 (ID)
- Simon Denis (1755–1813), 2 artworks: INV 1207, INV 1206 (IDs)
- Balthasar Denner (1685–1749), 3 artworks: MI 914, INV 1209 (IDs)
- Émile Deroy (1820–1846), 1 artwork: RF 1953-23 (ID)
- Thomas Desangles (1749-after 1790), 1 artwork: RF 1947-40 (ID)
- Blaise Alexandre Desgoffe (1805–1882), 2 artworks: RF 1997–1, RF 1979-66 (IDs)
- Jean-Baptiste-Henri Deshays (1729–1765 ), 2 artworks: RF 1997–53, RF 3058 (IDs)
- Monsu Desiderio (1593–1640), 1 artwork: RF 2431 (ID)
- Alexandre-François Desportes (1661–1743 ), 13 artworks: INV 3912, INV 3912 (IDs)
- Claude François Desportes (1695–1774), 1 artwork: INV 4064 (ID)
- Alexandre-François Desportes (1661–1743 ), 13 artworks: INV 20804, INV 3912 (IDs)
- Nicolas Desportes (1718–1787), 1 artwork: INV 4066 (ID)
- Georges Desvallieres (1861–1950), 1 artwork: RF 1991 18 (ID)
- Eugène Devéria (1808–1865), 5 artworks: RF 1961–15, RF 2648 (IDs)
- Achille Devéria (1800–1857), 1 artwork: INV 4067 (ID)
- Arthur William Devis (1712–1787), 1 artwork: RF 1984-7 (ID)
- Cornelis de Vos (1584–1651), 1 artwork: MI 1009 (ID)
- Théophile Deyrolle (1844–1923), 1 artwork: INV 20565 (ID)
- Louis de Deyster (1646–1711), 1 artwork: RF 1994-8 (ID)
- Andrea di Leone (1610–1685), 1 artwork: RF 1983-2 (ID)
- Narcisse Virgilio Díaz (1807–1876 ), 16 artworks: RF 1404, RF 1820 (IDs)
- Abraham van Diepenbeeck (1596–1675), 1 artwork: INV 1210 (ID)
- Christian Wilhelm Ernst Dietrich (1712–1774), 1 artwork: INV 1212 (ID)
- Antoine Dieu (1662–1727), 1 artwork: INV 6719 (ID)
- Anthony van Dyck (1599–1641), 23 artworks: RF 1983–88, MI 208 (IDs)
- Philip van Dijk (1683–1753), 2 artworks: INV 1266, INV 1265 (IDs)
- Nicolas Dipre (1495–1532), 3 artworks: RF 1986–4, RF 1986-3 (IDs)
- Gaspare Diziani (1689–1767), 1 artwork: RF 1983-57 (ID)
- Giovanni Do (c. 1617 – 1656), 1 artwork: MI 892 (ID)
- Carlo Dolci (1616–1686), 3 artworks: RF 3827, RF 3827 (IDs)
- Pierre-Salomon Domenchin de Chavanne (1672–1744), 1 artwork: INV 3232 (ID)
- Domenichino (1581–1641), 15 artworks: INV 791, INV 318 (IDs)
- Lambert Doomer (1624–1700), 1 artwork: RF 3733 (ID)
- Michel Dorigny (1617–1663), 10 artworks: INV 20360, INV 20353 (IDs)
- Battista Dossi (c. 1490 – 1548), 1 artwork: INV 269 (ID)
- Dosso Dossi (1469–1542), 1 artwork: INV 866 (ID)
- Gerrit Dou (1613–1675), 12 artworks: MI 915, INV 1223 (IDs)
- Gabriel-François Doyen (1726–1806), 1 artwork: RF 653 (ID)
- Alfred de Dreux (1810–1860), 4 artworks: RF 1988–19, RF 1992-11 (IDs)
- Martin Drolling (1752–1817), 8 artworks: RF 1998–14, RF 1945-7 (IDs)
- Dromart (active 1800–1850), 1 artwork: RF 1945-28 (ID)
- Willem Drost (1633–1659), 2 artworks: RF 1751, RF 1349 (IDs)
- François-Hubert Drouais (1727–1775), 7 artworks: RF 1977–14, INV 4108 (IDs)
- Jean-Germain Drouais (1763–1788), 3 artworks: INV 20819, INV 4142 (IDs)
- Adolphe Henri Dubasty (1814–1884), 1 artwork: INV 20859 (ID)
- Hendrick Dubbels (1621–1707), 1 artwork: RF 3718 (ID)
- Jean Dubois the Elder (1604–1679), 1 artwork: INV 6694 (ID)
- Alexandre-Jean Dubois-Drahonet (1791–1834), 1 artwork: MI 709 (ID)
- Toussaint Dubreuil (1561–1602), 3 artworks: INV 862, INV 4157 (IDs)
- Claude-Marie Dubufe (1790–1864), 3 artworks: INV 4258, RF 1982-2 (IDs)
- François Duchatel (1618–1694), 1 artwork: INV 1227 (ID)
- Jacob Duck (1600–1667), 1 artwork: INV 1228 (ID)
- Johan le Ducq (1629–1676), 1 artwork: INV 4275 (ID)
- Joseph Ducreux (1735–1802), 1 artwork: RF 2261 (ID)
- Charles Alphonse du Fresnoy (1611–1668), 1 artwork: INV 1290 (ID)
- Raoul Dufy (1877–1953), 1 artwork: DL 1997-2 (ID)
- Gaspard Dughet (1615–1675), 3 artworks: INV 270, RF 1956-9 (IDs)
- Willem Cornelisz Duyster (1599–1635), 1 artwork: INV 1229 (ID)
- Karel Dujardin (1626–1678), 9 artworks: MI 935, INV 1401 (IDs)
- Michel Dumas, 1 artwork: INV 20060 (ID)
- Daniel Dumonstier (1574–1645), 1 artwork: RF 1938–61 (ID)
- Jacques Dumont (1701–1781), 4 artworks: INV 4284, INV 4283 (IDs)
- Alexandre Hyacinthe Dunouy (1757–1841), 1 artwork: INV 4294 (ID)
- Joseph Duplessis (1725–1802 ), 5 artworks: RF 2301, INV 3118 (IDs)
- Jean Duplessis-Bertaux (1747–1819), 1 artwork: RF 1970-45 (ID)
- Louis Richard François Dupont (1734–1765), 1 artwork: RF 1992-413 (ID)
- Jules Dupré (1811–1889 ), 13 artworks: RF 1418, RF 1422 (IDs)
- Pierre Dupuys (1610–1682), 3 artworks: DL 1970–8, RF 1982-20 (IDs)
- Louis Jean-Jacques Durameau (1733–1796), 1 artwork: INV 4326 (ID)
- Carolus-Duran (1837–1917), 2 artworks: INV 20030, INV 20049 (IDs)
- Antoine Auguste Durandeau (1854-?), 2 artworks: RF 3775, RF 1941-7 (IDs)
- Albrecht Dürer (1471–1528), 1 artwork: RF 2382 (ID) (Portrait of the Artist Holding a Thistle)
- Cornelis Dusart (1660–1704), 1 artwork: RF 3716 (ID)
- Constant Dutilleux (1807–1865), 2 artworks: RF 1991–19, RF 2286 (IDs)
- Pierre Duval le Camus (1790–1854), 1 artwork: INV 4336 (ID)
- Victor Duval (1795–1889), 2 artworks: RF 1993–15, RF 1939-6 (IDs)

== E ==
- Christoffer Wilhelm Eckersberg (1783–1853), 3 artworks: RF 1987–27, RF 2241 (IDs)
- Gerbrand van den Eeckhout (1621–1674), 1 artwork: INV 1267 (ID)
- Justus van Egmont (1601–1674), 1 artwork: RF 1996-16 (ID)
- Jacob van Es (1596–1666), 1 artwork: RF 1959-28 (ID)
- Jerónimo Jacinto de Espinosa (1600–1667 ), 1 artwork: RF 1973-2 (ID)
- Hubert-Denis Etcheverry (1867–1952), 1 artwork: INV 20418 (ID)
- William Etty (1787–1849), 3 artworks: RF 1989–18, RF 1539 (IDs)
- Allaert van Everdingen (1621–1675), 3 artworks: RF 3704, MI 921 (IDs)
- Barthélemy d'Eyck (1444–1469), 1 artwork: RF 1993-4 (ID)
- Jan van Eyck (1370–1441), 2 artworks: INV 1271, INV 1271 (IDs)
- Frans Ykens (1601–1693), 1 artwork: MI 1333 (ID)

== F ==
- François-Xavier Fabre (1766–1837 ), 1 artwork: INV 20541 (ID)
- Gentile da Fabriano (1375–1427), 1 artwork: INV 295 (ID)
- Carel Fabritius (1622–1654), 1 artwork: RF 3834 (ID)
- Barent Fabritius (1624–1673), 1 artwork: RF 1993-17 (ID)
- Pietro Faccini (1562–1602), 1 artwork: INV 266 (ID)
- Aniello Falcone (1607–c.1656 ), 1 artwork: INV 275 (ID)
- Carel van Falens (1683–1733), 4 artworks: INV 1284, INV 1283 (IDs)
- Henri Fantin-Latour (1836–1904), 1 artwork: RF 1961-39 (ID)
- Paolo Farinati (1524–1606), 2 artworks: INV 890, RF 1276 (IDs)
- Bernardino Fasolo (c. 1489 – after 1526), 1 artwork: INV 276 (ID)
- Lorenzo Fasolo (1463–1518), 1 artwork: INV 352 (ID)
- Laurent Fauchier (1643–1672), 1 artwork: RF 2472 (ID)
- Henri de Favanne (1668–1752), 2 artworks: INV 8135, RF 2865 (IDs)
- Antoine de Favray (1706–c.1792), 2 artworks: INV 4376, MI 1053 (IDs)
- Thomas Fearnley (1802–1842), 1 artwork: RF 1981-47 (ID)
- Jean Baptiste Féret (1665–1739), 1 artwork: RF 1955-2 (ID)
- William Gouw Ferguson (1632–1700), 1 artwork: MI 712 (ID)
- Ercole de' Roberti (1450–1469), 1 artwork: RF 1271 (ID)
- Gregorio de Ferrari (1647–1726), 1 artwork: RF 1981-9 (ID)
- Domenico Fetti (c. 1589 – 1623), 4 artworks: INV 282, INV 280 (IDs)
- Domenico Fiasella (1589–1669), 1 artwork: INV 700 (ID)
- Baltazar Gomes Figueira (1604–1674), 1 artwork: RF 1996-9 (ID)
- Rosso Fiorentino (1494–1541), 2 artworks: INV 595, INV 594 (IDs)
- Juan de Flandes (1465–1519), 1 artwork: RF 2557 (ID)
- Hippolyte Flandrin (1809–1864), 10 artworks: RF 1977–434, RF 1984-29 (IDs)
- Paul Flandrin (1811–1902), 3 artworks: RF 1997–8, RF 1987-19 (IDs)
- Georg Flegel (1563–1638), 1 artwork: RF 1981-21 (ID)
- Camille Flers (1802–1868), 1 artwork: RF 130 (ID)
- Antoine-Claude Fleury (1743–1822), 1 artwork: RF 122 (ID)
- François Antoine Léon Fleury (1804–1858), 1 artwork: INV 4460 (ID)
- Govert Flinck (1615–1660), 4 artworks: RF 1961–69, RF 1985-82 (IDs)
- Frans Floris (1519–1570), 1 artwork: INV 20746 (ID)
- Niccolò Alunno (c. 1420 – 1502 ), 2 artworks: RF 1985–1, INV 53 (IDs)
- Lavinia Fontana (1552–1614), 1 artwork: INV 383 (ID)
- Francesco Fontebasso (1707–1769), 2 artworks: RF 1962–18, MI 883 (IDs)
- Jean-Louis Forain (1852–1931), 1 artwork: RF 1961 40 (ID)
- Auguste de Forbin (1777–1841), 9 artworks: INV 4494, INV 4496 (IDs)
- Jean Fouquet (c. 1420 – c. 1480), 2 artworks: INV 9619, INV 9106 (IDs)
- Jean-Honoré Fragonard (1732–1806), 34 artworks: RF 1970–32, RF 2003-9 (IDs)
- Alexandre-Évariste Fragonard (1780–1850), 11 artworks: RF 1997–38, RF 1984-19 (IDs)
- Piero della Francesca (1410–1492), 1 artwork: RF 1978-1 (ID)
- Marcantonio Franceschini (1648–1729), 1 artwork: INV 27 (ID)
- Frans Francken the Younger (1581–1642), 7 artworks: RF 1535, INV 1294 (IDs)
- Lucas Franchoys the Elder (1574–1643), 1 artwork: INV 1249 (ID)
- Henri J. François (1790–1868), 1 artwork: RF 3957 (ID)
- Guy François (1578/79-1650), 1 artwork: RF 1985-20 (ID)
- Sebastian Vrancx (1573–1647), 2 artworks: RF 1182, RF 1053 (IDs)
- Jean-Pierre Franque (1774–1860), 1 artwork: INV 4560 (ID)
- Jean-Augustin Franquelin (1798–1839), 6 artworks: RF 2957, RF 2965 (IDs)
- Léon Frédéric (1865–1940), 3 artworks: RF 1152 C, RF 1152 B (IDs)
- Bartolo di Fredi (c. 1330 – c. 1410), 1 artwork: MI 394 (ID)
- Martin Fréminet (1567–1619), 1 artwork: RF 2007–13 (ID)
- Caspar David Friedrich (1774–1840), 1 artwork: RF 1975-20 (ID)
- Nicolas Froment (c. 1435 – c. 1486), 1 artwork: RF 665 (ID)
- Eugène Fromentin (1820–1876 ), 3 artworks: RF 1700, RF 1425 (IDs)
- Francesco Furini (1600–1646), 1 artwork: INV 704 (ID)
- Henry Fuseli (1741–1825 ), 1 artwork: RF 1970-29 (ID)
- Jan Fyt (1611–1661), 4 artworks: MI 922, INV 1300 (IDs)

== G ==
- Bénigne Gagnereaux (1756–1795), 1 artwork: RF 1994-21 (ID)
- Gagneux (18th century), 1 artwork: RF 1950-16 (ID)
- Thomas Gainsborough (1727–1788), 3 artworks: RF 1947–1, RF 3660 (IDs)
- Nicolas-Auguste Galimard (1813–1880), 1 artwork: RF 549 (ID)
- Louis Gallait (1810–1887), 1 artwork: RF 1976 2 (ID)
- Louis Galloche (1670–1761), 2 artworks: MI 310, INV 4658 (IDs)
- Giuseppe Gambarini (1680–1725), 1 artwork: RF 1982 79 (ID)
- Jacques Gamelin (1738–1803), 2 artworks: RF 1973–54, RF 1953-33 (IDs)
- Gaetano Gandolfi (1734–1802), 1 artwork: RF 1983-58 (ID)
- Ubaldo Gandolfi (1728–1781), 1 artwork: RF 1983-59 (ID)
- Etienne-Barthélemy Garnier (1759–1849), 2 artworks: INV 20310, INV 20310 (IDs)
- François Garnier (died 1672), 1 artwork: RF 1952-9 (ID)
- Jean Bruno Gassies (1786–1832), 4 artworks: INV 4689, INV 4685 (IDs)
- Bernardino Gatti (c. 1495 – 1576), 1 artwork: INV 160 (ID)
- Louis Gauffier (1761–1801), 1 artwork: INV 4693 (ID)
- Giovanni Battista Gaulli (1639–1709), 2 artworks: RF 1997–34, INV 20298 (IDs)
- Claude Gautherot (1769–1825), 1 artwork: INV 4701 (ID)
- Geertgen tot Sint Jans (1460–1495), 1 artwork: RF 1285 (ID)
- Aert de Gelder (1645–1727), 3 artworks: RF 1984–154, RF 1984-153 (IDs)
- Auguste Ernest Gendron (1817–1881), 1 artwork: RF 1993 30 (ID)
- Justus van Gent (1430–1490), 14 artworks: MI 657, MI 656 (IDs)
- Orazio Gentileschi (1563–1639), 2 artworks: INV 6809, INV 340 (IDs)
- François Gérard (1770–1837 ), 11 artworks: RF 1992–407, RF 1973-28 (IDs)
- Alexandre Gere (b1807), 1 artwork: INV 20391 (ID)
- Théodore Géricault (1791–1824 ), 31 artworks: RF 364, RF 3962 (IDs)
- Niccolò di Pietro Gerini (active 1366 – c. 1415), 1 artwork: RF 2008-4 (ID)
- Berbardo German y Llorente (1680–1759), 2 artworks: RF 1955–18, RF 1955-17 (IDs)
- Jean-Léon Gérôme (1824–1904), 1 artwork: RF 2303 (ID)
- Francesco Gessi (1588–1649), 1 artwork: INV 523 (ID)
- Domenico Ghirlandaio (1449–1494), 4 artworks: RF 1266, RF 1266 (IDs)
- Ridolfo Ghirlandaio (1483–1561), 1 artwork: RF 1980-193 (ID)
- Fra Galgario (1655–1743 ), 1 artwork: RF 1991-4 (ID)
- Giampietrino (1495/1520), 1 artwork: RF 2282 (ID)
- Giannicolo da Perugia (c. 1460 – 1544 ), 4 artworks: MI 564, MI 563 (IDs)
- Corrado Giaquinto (1703–1766), 1 artwork: RF 1983-60 (ID)
- Jean Gigoux (1806–1894), 1 artwork: INV 20068 (ID)
- Jacob Gillig (1636–1701), 1 artwork: RF 3720 (ID)
- Claude Gillot (1673–1722), 2 artworks: RF 2405, RF 1945-26 (IDs)
- Luca Giordano (1632–1705), 16 artworks: RF 1985–63, RF 1983-61 (IDs)
- Matteo Giovanetti (c. 1300 – c. 1368), 2 artworks: RF 1996–4, RF 1996-3 (IDs)
- Giovanni Da Milano (active 1350-69-after 1369), 1 artwork: INV 20162 (ID)
- Giovanni da Modena (1409–1456), 1 artwork: RF 1983-45 (ID)
- Giovanni da Rimini (1292–1336), 1 artwork: RF 202 (ID)
- Charles Giraud (1802–1881), 2 artworks: RF 1990–4, RF 2842 (IDs)
- Anne-Louis Girodet de Roussy-Trioson (1767–1824 ), 10 artworks: RF 2960, RF 1994-7 (IDs)
- Girolamo Di Benvenuto (1470–1524), 1 artwork: MI 587 (ID)
- Achille Giroux (1816–1854), 3 artworks: INV 20405, INV 20405 (IDs)
- Giuliano di Simone (active 14th), 1 artwork: MI 407 (ID)
- Auguste-Barthélemy Glaize (1807–1893), 1 artwork: INV 20544 (ID)
- Johannes Glauber (1646–1726), 1 artwork: INV 1301 (ID)
- Marc-Charles-Gabriel Gleyre (1806–1874), 1 artwork: INV 10039 (ID)
- John Glover (artist) (1767–1849 ), 2 artworks: INV 10088, INV 10087 (IDs)
- Madeleine Goblot (d. after 1892), 1 artwork: RF 1974-11 (ID)
- Hendrik Goltzius (1558–1617), 1 artwork: RF 2125 (ID)
- Jan Mabuse (1478–1532), 2 artworks: RF 23, INV 1442; INV 1443 (IDs)
- Nicolas Gosse (1787–1878), 6 artworks: RF 1995–7, INV 8475 (IDs)
- Jean de Gourmont (c. 1483 – c. 1551), 1 artwork: INV 4988 (ID)
- Francisco Goya (1746–1828 ), 8 artworks: RF 1982–28, RF 1976-69 (IDs)
- Jan van Goyen (1596–1656), 9 artworks: RF 1961 87, RF 1961–86 (IDs)
- Anton Graff (1736–1813), 1 artwork: RF 3693 (ID)
- François Marius Granet (1775–1849 ), 6 artworks: RF 1981–12, INV 5003 (IDs)
- Jean-Pierre Granger (1779–1840), 2 artworks: MI 330, RF 1704 (IDs)
- Frédéric Grasset (1848–1911), 2 artworks: RF 1969–9, RF 1969-8 (IDs)
- Pieter de Grebber (1600–1653), 1 artwork: RF 2136 (ID)
- Jean-Baptiste Greuze (1725–1805), 22 artworks: MI 1067, RF 2153 (IDs)
- Adriaen de Grijef (1657–1742), 1 artwork: INV 1308 (ID)
- Giovanni Francesco Grimaldi (1606–1680 ), 1 artwork: INV 316 (ID)
- Alexis Grimou (1678–1733), 3 artworks: INV 5048, INV 5045 (IDs)
- Nikolay Nikolayevitch Gritsenko (1856–1900), 1 artwork: INV 20652; 24137 (1954) (ID)
- Antoine-Jean Gros (1771–1835), 13 artworks: INV 5067, INV 5060 (IDs)
- Francesco Guardi (1712–1793), 17 artworks: RF 1983–62, INV 20726 (IDs)
- Giacomo Guardi (1764–1835), 2 artworks: RF 1970–44, RF 1970-43 (IDs)
- Théodore Gudin (1802–1880), 2 artworks: INV 5152, INV 5141 (IDs)
- Guercino (1591–1666), 12 artworks: INV 89, INV 91 (IDs)
- Pierre-Narcisse Guérin (1774–1833), 12 artworks: RF 1982–13, RF 1978-49 (IDs)
- Gregorio Guglielmi (1714–1773), 4 artworks: RF 1997–29, RF 1939-31 (IDs)
- Jacques Guiaud (1811–1876), 1 artwork: INV 5254 (ID)
- Joseph Guichard (1806–1880), 2 artworks: INV 2954, RF 1759 (IDs)
- Guido of Siena (active in the second half of 13th century-), 2 artworks: RF 1968–10, RF 1968-9 (IDs)
- Bartolomeo Guidobono (1654–1709), 1 artwork: RF 2331 (ID)
- Adrien Guignet (1816–1854), 2 artworks: DL 1972–1, INV 5255 (IDs)
- Guillaume Guillon-Lethière (1760–1832), 4 artworks: INV 6226, INV 6228 (IDs)
- Peeter Gijsels (1621–1690), 2 artworks: INV 1091, INV 1090 (IDs)

== H ==
- Joris van der Haagen (1615–1669), 2 artworks: MI 925, INV 1315 (IDs)
- Johannes van Haensbergen (1642–1705), 1 artwork: INV 1549 (ID)
- Efchar Mohammed Hacan (active 1825–1850), 1 artwork: MV 6700; INV 10108; LP 3935 (ID)
- August Hagborg (1852–1925), 1 artwork: RF 248 (ID)
- Noël Hallé (1711–1781), 5 artworks: DL 1991–3, INV 5270 (IDs)
- Claude Guy Hallé (1652–1736), 1 artwork: MI 311 (ID)
- Frans Hals (1582–1666), 6 artworks: RF 1984–32, RF 2130 (IDs)
- Dirck Hals (1591–1656), 1 artwork: RF 302 (ID)
- Adriaen Hanneman (1603–1671), 1 artwork: MI 910 (ID)
- Pieter van Hanselaere (1786–1862), 1 artwork: RF 1993-18 (ID)
- Constantin Hansen (1804–1880), 1 artwork: RF 1994-6 (ID)
- Jean-Baptiste Auguste Harle (1809–1876), 3 artworks: RF 1984–4, RF 1984-3 (IDs)
- Henri Harpignies (1819–1916 ), 1 artwork: RF 2528 BIS (ID)
- Jobst Harrich (1579–1617), 1 artwork: RF 1968-7 (ID)
- Hortense Haudebourt-Lescot (1784–1845), 4 artworks: RF 1992–2, INV 5287 (IDs)
- Ernest Hebert (1817–1908), 1 artwork: RF 156; LUX 331; L 41.30 (ID)
- Willem Claeszoon Heda (1594–1680), 1 artwork: INV 1319 (ID)
- Jan Davidsz. de Heem (1606–1683), 2 artworks: INV 1321, INV 1320 (IDs)
- Jan Janszoon de Heem (1650–1695), 1 artwork: RF 1939-10 (ID)
- Egbert van Heemskerck (1634–1704), 1 artwork: MI 928 (ID)
- François-Joseph Heim (1787–1865), 9 artworks: RF 1977–450, INV 20139 (IDs)
- Wolfgang Heimbach (c.1610–after 1678), 1 artwork: RF 1984 17 (ID)
- Johann Julius Heinsius (1740–1812), 4 artworks: RF 1939–3, MI 711 (IDs)
- Bartholomeus van der Helst (1613–1670), 5 artworks: RF 1984–8, INV 1332 (IDs)
- Jan Sanders van Hemessen (1500–1575), 1 artwork: INV 1335 (ID)
- Philippe-Auguste Hennequin (1763–1833), 2 artworks: INV 20097, INV 5322 (IDs)
- Jean Jacques Henner (1829–1905), 1 artwork: RF 1961-46 (ID)
- C. Heron, 1 artwork: RF 1993 31 (ID)
- Francisco Herrera the Elder (c. 1590 – 1656), 3 artworks: RF 1963–2, RF 1963 1 (IDs)
- Louis Hersent (1777–1860), 3 artworks: INV 5329, INV 5328 (IDs)
- Adolphe Hervier (1818–1879 ), 1 artwork: RF 2460 (ID)
- Jacquemart De Hesdin (c. 1390 – c. 1411), 1 artwork: RF 2835 (ID)
- Alexandre Hesse (1806–1879), 1 artwork: RF 1985-3 (ID)
- Willem de Heusch (1625–1692), 1 artwork: INV 1336 (ID)
- Jan van der Heyden (1637–1712), 8 artworks: RF 1961–88, RF 1950-41 (IDs)
- Jean-Baptiste Hilaire (1753–1822), 4 artworks: INV 5352, INV 5353 (IDs)
- Alphonse Hirsch (1843–1884), 1 artwork: RF 1980-207 (ID)
- Meindert Hobbema (1638–1709), 3 artworks: RF 1526, MI 270 (IDs)
- Hans Holbein the Younger (1497–1543), 5 artworks: INV 1348, INV 1347 (IDs)
- Melchior d'Hondecoeter (1636–1695), 2 artworks: RF 707, MI 931 (IDs)
- Abraham Hondius (1631–1691), 1 artwork: RF 656 (ID)
- Gerard van Honthorst (1592–1656), 6 artworks: INV 1369, RF 2856 (IDs)
- Pieter de Hooch (1629–1683), 3 artworks: RF 1974–29, INV 1373 (IDs)
- Samuel Dirksz van Hoogstraten (1627–1678), 1 artwork: RF 3722 (ID)
- Jean Hey (1471–1500), 6 artworks: RF 536, RF 1521 (IDs)
- John Hoppner (1758–1810), 5 artworks: RF 3960, RF 818 (IDs)
- René-Antoine Houasse (active-16441710), 2 artworks: INV 6677, MI 313 (IDs)
- Gerard Houckgeest (1600–1661), 1 artwork: INV 1374 (ID)
- Jean-Pierre Houël (1735–1813), 5 artworks: MI 265, MI 266 (IDs)
- Joséphine Houssay (1840–1901), 1 artwork: INV 20098 (ID)
- Wolf Huber (1490–1553), 1 artwork: RF 1968-1 (ID)
- Paul Huet (1803–1869), 16 artworks: RF 1065, INV 5413 (IDs)
- Jean-Baptiste Huet (1745–1811 ), 1 artwork: INV 5411 (ID)
- Huchtenburg (1647–1733), 1 artwork: INV 1375 (ID)
- Paul Hugues (1891–1972), 3 artworks: INV 20441, INV 20443 (IDs)
- Jaume Huguet (c. 1415 – 1492), 2 artworks: RF 1967–6, INV 8562 BIS (IDs)
- Cornelis Huysmans (1648–1727), 10 artworks: MI 934, RF 53 (IDs)
- Anselm van Hulle (1601–1674), 1 artwork: MI 920 (ID)
- Jacques Hupin (active in mid-17th century-), 1 artwork: RF 1972 38 (ID)
- Charles Francois Hutin (1715–1776), 1 artwork: RF 3951 (ID)
- Pieter Huys (1519–1584), 1 artwork: RF 3936 (ID)
- Jan van Huysum (1682–1749), 9 artworks: RF 708, INV 1389 (IDs)

== I ==
- Angelo Inganni (1807–1880), 1 artwork: INV 20617 (ID)
- Jean Auguste Dominique Ingres (1780–1867 ), 57 artworks: DL 1969–2, DL 1970-10 (IDs)
- Eugène Isabey (1803–1886 ), 8 artworks: RF 1430, RF 1974-13 (IDs)
- Franz Ittenbach (1813–1879), 1 artwork: RF 1979-14 (ID)

== J ==
- Moïse Jacobber (1786–1863 ), 1 artwork: INV 1391 (ID)
- Dirck Jacobsz. (1497–1567), 1 artwork: RF 1938-24 (ID)
- Claudius Jacquand (1803–1878), 1 artwork: RF 433 (ID)
- Louis Godefroy Jadin (1805–1882), 9 artworks: RF 1993-32 I, RF 1993-32 H (IDs)
- Ernest Jaime (1804–1884), 1 artwork: INV 20086 (ID)
- Charles Jalabert (1819–1901), 1 artwork: RF 655 (ID)
- Paul Jamot (1863–1939), 5 artworks: RF 1941–15, RF 1941-16 (IDs)
- Hieronymus Janssens (1624–1693), 1 artwork: INV 1392 (ID)
- Philippe Auguste Jeanron (1809–1877), 1 artwork: RF 1943-2 (ID)
- Étienne Jeaurat (1699–1789 ), 3 artworks: RF 1946–7, RF 2440 (IDs)
- Nicolas Henri Jeaurat de Bertry (1728–1796), 1 artwork: RF 1998-8 (ID)
- Christian Albrecht Jensen (1792–1870), 1 artwork: RF 1980 48 (ID)
- André Jolivard (1787–1851), 1 artwork: INV 5458 (ID)
- Pierre-Jules Jollivet (1794–1871), 2 artworks: INV 5467, INV 5474 (IDs)
- Johan Jongkind (1819–1891), 5 artworks: RF 1961–54, RF 1961-53 (IDs)
- Jacob Jordaens (1593–1678), 9 artworks: INV 1982–11, RF 1982-11 (IDs)
- Jean Jouvenet (1644–1717), 9 artworks: INV 5496, INV 5487 (IDs)
- Simon Julien (1735–1800), 2 artworks: RF 1964–12, RF 1964-11 (IDs)

== K ==
- Willem Kalf (1619–1693), 3 artworks: INV 1411, MI 938 (IDs)
- Angelica Kauffman (1741–1807), 1 artwork: MI 245 (ID)
- Leon Kaufmann (1872–1933), 2 artworks: INV 20609, INV 20608 (IDs)
- Pedro Campaña (1503–1580), 1 artwork: RF 1986-52 (ID)
- Adèle de Kercado (19th century), 1 artwork: INV 215 (ID)
- Cornelis Janssens van Ceulen (1593–1661), 1 artwork: INV 1122 (ID)
- Willem Key (1515–1568), 3 artworks: RF 217, RF 217 (IDs)
- Thomas de Keyser (1596–1667), 2 artworks: INV 1413, RF 1560 (IDs)
- David Kindt (1580–1652), 1 artwork: INV 20747 (ID)
- Martin Knoller (1725–1804), 1 artwork: RF 1985-16 (ID)
- Christen Købke (1810–1848 ), 2 artworks: RF 1995–18, RF 1980-46 (IDs)
- Lucas Cornelisz de Kock (1495–1552), 1 artwork: INV 20085 (ID)
- Johann Konig (1586–1642), 1 artwork: INV 1988 (ID)
- Salomon Koninck (1609–1656), 1 artwork: INV 1741 (ID)
- Johann Peter Krafft (1780–1856), 1 artwork: RF 1985-17 (ID)
- Tadeusz Kuntze (1727–1793), 1 artwork: RF 1997-20 (ID)

== L ==
- Charles de La Fosse (1636–1716 ), 5 artworks: MI 316, INV 4527 (IDs)
- Jacob van der Laemen (1584–1630), 1 artwork: INV 20384 (ID)
- Adélaïde Labille-Guiard (1749–1803), 1 artwork: RF 1575 (ID)
- Edme Emile Laborne (1837–1913), 1 artwork: RF 1976-74 (ID)
- Pieter van Laer (1592–1642), 2 artworks: INV 1418, INV 1417 (IDs)
- Prosper Lafaye (1806–1883), 1 artwork: INV 20099 (ID)
- Louis Lafitte (1770–1828), 1 artwork: RF 2263 (ID)
- Jean-Jacques Lagrenée (1739–1821), 3 artworks: RF 1998–6, INV 5568 (IDs)
- Louis-Jean-François Lagrenée (1725–1805), 7 artworks: RF 1983–77, RF 1983-76 (IDs)
- Laurent de La Hyre (1605–1656), 13 artworks: RF 1996–15, MI 317 (IDs)
- Jean Lair (1889-?), 1 artwork: RF 1961-55 (ID)
- Gerard de Lairesse (1640–1711), 4 artworks: RF 1964–8, INV 1422 (IDs)
- Jacques de Lajoue (1686–1761), 3 artworks: MV 4420; INV 5574; LP 850, RF 2434 (IDs)
- Francesco Albani (1578–1660), 13 artworks: INV 2, INV 20 (IDs)
- Emile Lambinet (1813–1877), 1 artwork: INV 5578 (ID)
- Eugène Lami (1800–1890), 3 artworks: INV 5579, INV 5579 (IDs)
- Johann Baptist von Lampi the Elder (1751–1830), 2 artworks: RF 2468, RF 2378 (IDs)
- Charles Lamy (1689–1743), 1 artwork: INV 8639 (ID)
- Nicolas Lancret (1690–1743), 16 artworks: RF 1990–20, RF 1990-19 (IDs)
- Charles Landelle (1821–1908), 1 artwork: RF 2196 (ID)
- Edwin Henry Landseer (1802–1873), 1 artwork: RF 1986-54 (ID)
- Giovanni Lanfranco (1582–1647), 1 artwork: INV 332 (ID)
- Jérôme-Martin Langlois (1779–1838), 1 artwork: RF 234 (ID)
- Félix-Hippolyte Lanoüe (1812–1872), 1 artwork: RF 99; RF 386 (ID)
- Simon Mathurin Lantara (1729–1778), 1 artwork: RF 1998-17 (ID)
- Louis-Auguste Lapito (1803–1874), 1 artwork: RF 1997-9 (ID)
- Nicolas de Largillière (1656–1746), 16 artworks: DL 1970–11, INV 20454 (IDs)
- Louis Eugène Lariviere (1801–1823), 1 artwork: RF 1750 (ID)
- Guillaume Larrue (1851–1935), 1 artwork: RF 3954 (ID)
- Gustave Lassalle-Bordes (1815–1886), 1 artwork: INV 20062 (ID)
- Pieter Lastman (1583–1633), 1 artwork: RF 920 (ID)
- Eugène Latteux (1805–1850), 1 artwork: INV 5723 (ID)
- Désiré François Laugee (1823–1896), 1 artwork: RF 2798 (ID)
- Pietro Lorenzetti (1280–1348), 1 artwork: RF 1986-2 (ID)
- Jean Antoine Laurent (1763–1832), 2 artworks: RF 1983–5, RF 879 (IDs)
- Filippo Lauri (1623–1694), 3 artworks: RF 1983–63, INV 337 (IDs)
- Thomas Lawrence (1769–1830), 7 artworks: RF 312, RF 1576 (IDs)
- Cecil C. P. Lawson (1880–1967), 1 artwork: RF 1980-130; LUX 1129 P; J DE P 195 P (ID)
- Jérémie le Pilleur (active 1612–1638), 1 artwork: RF 1942-1 (ID)
- Sébastien Leclerc (1637–1714), 1 artwork: INV 3252 (ID)
- Le Nain (1588–1648), 15 artworks: RF 1971–9, RF 1971-9 (IDs)
- Juan de Valdés Leal (1622–1690), 3 artworks: RF 1980–6, RF 1980-5 (IDs)
- Leandro Bassano (1557–1622), 1 artwork: INV 431 (ID)
- André Lebre (1629–1700), 1 artwork: INV 20006 (ID)
- Eustache Le Sueur (1616–1655), 55 artworks: RF 1988–49, RF 1988-49 (IDs)
- Hippolyte Lecomte (1781–1857), 1 artwork: INV 5765 (ID)
- Horace Lecoq de Boisbaudran (1802–1897), 1 artwork: RF 2673 (ID)
- Jeanne Philiberte Ledoux (1767–1840 ), 1 artwork: RF 1947-43 (ID)
- Claude Lefebvre (artist) (1632–1672), 2 artworks: INV 4381, INV 4380 (IDs)
- Robert Lefèvre (1755–1830 ), 3 artworks: RF 671, RF 1968-8 (IDs)
- Jean-François Legillon (1739–1797 ), 1 artwork: INV 6162 (ID)
- Auguste Leloir (1809–1892), 1 artwork: INV 6175 (ID)
- Peter Lely (1618–1680), 1 artwork: INV 1250 (ID)
- Jean Lemaire (painter) (c. 1597 – 1659 ), 2 artworks: INV 6419, INV 6418 (IDs)
- Louis Nicolas Lemasle (1788–1870), 1 artwork: RF 1974-21 (ID)
- François Lemoyne (1688–1737), 6 artworks: RF 1983–78, INV 6715 (IDs)
- Nicolas-Bernard Lépicié (1735–1784), 3 artworks: RF 1961–57, RF 671 BIS (IDs)
- Xavier Leprince (1799–1826), 2 artworks: INV 7332, RF 2951 (IDs)
- Georges Leroux (1877–1957 ), 1 artwork: RF 1974 3 (ID)
- Paul Alexandre Alfred Leroy (1860–1942), 1 artwork: RF 1975-17 (ID)
- Louis Alphonse Letellier (1780–1830), 1 artwork: INV 6225 (ID)
- Dimitri Grigorievitch Levitski (1735–1822), 2 artworks: RF 2175, RF 3057 (IDs)
- Robert Tournières (1667–1752), 1 artwork: RF 3729 (ID)
- Emile Levy (1826–1890 ), 5 artworks: RF 1993-27 E, RF 1993-27 D (IDs)
- Aertgen van Leyden (1498–1564), 1 artwork: RF 2502 (ID)
- Lucas van Leyden (1494–1533), 1 artwork: RF 1962-17 (ID)
- Judith Leyster (1609–1660), 1 artwork: RF 2131 (ID)
- Nestor L'Hôte (1804–1842), 4 artworks: MS 115, no 179, MS 115, no 170 (IDs)
- Louis Licherie (1629–1687), 1 artwork: RF 1943-10 (ID)
- Josse Lieferinxe (1493–1508), 3 artworks: RF 1991–12, RF 966 (IDs)
- Paul Liégeois (active 1650–1670), 1 artwork: RF 1984-20 (ID)
- Jan Lievens (1607–1674), 2 artworks: PR P 28; DL 1993–1, INV 1431 (IDs)
- Hendrik van Limborch (1681–1759), 1 artwork: INV 1433 (ID)
- Jacques Linard (c. 1600 – 1645), 3 artworks: DL 1970–12, RF 1982-23 (IDs)
- Johannes Lingelbach (1622–1674), 4 artworks: INV 1437, INV 1437 (IDs)
- John Linnell (1792–1882), 1 artwork: RF 1982-12 (ID)
- Jean-Étienne Liotard (1702–1789), 1 artwork: RF 1995-14 (ID)
- Lorenzo Lippi (1606–1665), 1 artwork: INV 179 (ID)
- Filippo Lippi (1406–1469), 4 artworks: RF 2222, INV 339 (IDs)
- Filippino Lippi (1457–1504), 1 artwork: INV 419 (ID)
- Lippo Memmi (1291–1356), 2 artworks: MI 690, MI 690 (IDs)
- Dirck van der Lisse (1607–1669), 1 artwork: RF 1969-3 (ID)
- Sebastian de Llanos y Valdes (1605–1677), 1 artwork: RF 1955-24 (ID)
- Nicolas Loir (1624–1679), 3 artworks: INV 8715, INV 8715 (IDs)
- Francesco Londonio (1723–1783), 1 artwork: RF 1937-114 (ID)
- Luca Longhi (1507–1580), 1 artwork: MI 614 (ID)
- Jacob van Loo (1614–1670), 2 artworks: INV 1440, INV 1439 (IDs)
- Charles-André van Loo (1705–1765 ), 5 artworks: INV 6279, INV 6279 (IDs)
- Charles Amédée Philippe van Loo (1719–1795), 1 artwork: INV 6386 (ID)
- Jean-Baptiste van Loo (1684–1745), 2 artworks: RF 1942–2, INV 6249 (IDs)
- Jules van Loo (1743–1821), 2 artworks: INV 6389, MI 1116 (IDs)
- Louis-Michel van Loo (1707–1771 ), 4 artworks: RF 1994–17, RF 1961–89 (IDs)
- Ambrogio Lorenzetti (1290–1348), 1 artwork: RF 2096 (ID)
- John Henry Lorimer (1856–1936), 1 artwork: RF 1977-445; LUX 793 P; J De P 538 P (ID)
- Claude Lorrain (1604–1682), 17 artworks: INV 4717, MI 1065 (IDs)
- Louis-Joseph Le Lorrain (1715- 1760), 1 artwork: RF 1976-19 (ID)
- Lorenzo Lotto (1480–1556), 4 artworks: RF 1982–50, MI 164 (IDs)
- Eugenio Lucas Velázquez (1817–1870 ), 3 artworks: RF 2542, RF 2542 (IDs)
- Sebastiano del Piombo (1485–1547), 3 artworks: INV 357, INV 357 (IDs)
- Bernardino Luini (1480–1532), 14 artworks: RF 2083, RF 199 (IDs)
- Johan Thomas Lundbye (1818–1848), 1 artwork: RF 1996-21 (ID)
- Gerrit Lundens (1622–after 1683), 1 artwork: MI 905 (ID)
- Catherine Lusurier (1753–1785), 1 artwork: INV 6406 (ID)
- Benedetto Luti (1666–1724), 1 artwork: INV 362 (ID)
- Corneille de Lyon (1505–1575), 14 artworks: RF 1976–15, INV 9451 (IDs)

== M ==
- Pierre-Antoine Demachy (1723–1807), 4 artworks: DL 1983–3, RF 1947-22 (IDs)
- Jean Malouel (1365–1419), 1 artwork: MI 692 (ID)
- Nicolaes Maes (1634–1693), 4 artworks: RF 2859, RF 2859 (IDs)
- Alessandro Magnasco (1667–1749), 6 artworks: INV 20724, INV 20724 (IDs)
- Nicolas Sébastien Maillot (1781–1856), 1 artwork: RF 1969-15 (ID)
- Bastiano Mainardi (1466–1513), 1 artwork: MI 1547 (ID)
- Hans Maler zu Schwaz (active-15101523), 1 artwork: RF 1958-8 (ID)
- Jean-Baptiste Mallet (1759–1835), 2 artworks: RF 1975 78, RF 3843 (IDs)
- Domenico Manetti (1609–1663), 1 artwork: INV 20597 (ID)
- Bartolomeo Manfredi (1582–1622), 1 artwork: RF 1990-29 (ID)
- Andrea Mantegna (1430–1506), 6 artworks: RF 1766, INV 371 (IDs)
- Biagio Manzoni (active 1620–1635), 1 artwork: RF 1958-13 (ID)
- Carlo Maratta (1625–1713), 6 artworks: INV 375, RF 3167 (IDs)
- Charles-Laurent Maréchal (1801–1887), 5 artworks: RF 1993-28 E, RF 1993-28 D (IDs)
- Francesco di Maria (1623–1690), 1 artwork: MI 200 (ID)
- Michele Marieschi (1710–1743), 1 artwork: INV 162 (ID)
- Prosper Marilhat (1811–1847), 1 artwork: RF 184 (ID)
- Simon Marmion (1420–1489), 1 artwork: RF 1490 (ID)
- Francesco Marmitta (c. 1460 – c. 1504), 1 artwork: INV 116 (ID)
- Anton von Maron (1733–1808), 1 artwork: RF 1997-17 (ID)
- François Marot (1666–1719), 2 artworks: INV 6444, INV 3525 (IDs)
- Otto Marseus van Schrieck (1619–1678), 1 artwork: RF 3711 (ID)
- Hendrik Martenszoon Sorgh (1610–1670), 3 artworks: MI 903, MI 903 (IDs)
- Alfred Martin (1888–1950), 2 artworks: INV 20425, INV 20426 (IDs)
- Simone Martini (1284–1344), 1 artwork: INV 670 BIS (ID)
- Bernat Martorell (c. 1400 – 1452), 4 artworks: RF 1573, RF 1572 (IDs)
- Jan Martszen de Jonge (1609–1647), 1 artwork: MI 812 (ID)
- Marco Marziale (1492–1507), 1 artwork: RF 1345 (ID)
- Master of 1499 (1499), 1 artwork: RF 2370 (ID)
- Master of 1518 (1518), 1 artwork: RF 1973-38 (ID)
- Master of Burgo de Osma (1400–1450), 3 artworks: RF 1709, RF 1708 (IDs)
- Master of the Codex of Saint George (active first half of the 14th century-), 1 artwork: INV 815 BIS (ID)
- Master of the Embroidered Foliage (1480–1510), 1 artwork: RF 1973-35; RF 1973-36 (ID)
- Master of the Female Half-Lengths (1530–1540), 1 artwork: INV 2156 (ID)
- Master of Frankfurt (1460–1520), 1 artwork: RF 1958-5 (ID)
- Master of the Legend of St. Ursula (Bruges) (1436–1505), 3 artworks: RF 2259, RF 969 (IDs)
- Master Of The Life Of The Virgin (1463–1480), 12 artworks: MI 466, MI 465 (IDs)
- Master of the Mansi Magdalen (1510–1530), 1 artwork: RF 2250 (ID)
- Master of the Osservanza Triptych (1430–1450), 1 artwork: RF 2470 (ID)
- Master of the Rebel Angels (active 1340–1345), 2 artworks: DL 1967-1 B, DL 1967-1 A (IDs)
- Master of the Saint Bartholomew Altarpiece (1465–1510), 1 artwork: INV 1445 (ID)
- Master of Saint Giles (active c. 1490–1510), 1 artwork: RF 3967 (ID)
- Master of Saint Severin (1485–1515), 2 artworks: RF 1972–1, RF 1972-2 (IDs)
- Master of the View of Ste-Gudule (1480–1499), 1 artwork: INV 1991 (ID)
- Massimo Stanzione (1586–1656), 1 artwork: RF 1997-36 (ID)
- Jan Matsys (1510–1575), 2 artworks: RF 2123, INV 1446 (IDs)
- Quentin Matsys (1466–1530), 3 artworks: RF 1475, RF 817 (IDs)
- Louis Matout (1811–1888), 1 artwork: INV 20109 (ID)
- Franz Anton Maulbertsch (1724–1796), 2 artworks: RF 1997–7, RF 1987-5 (IDs)
- Henri Mauperché (1602–1686), 2 artworks: RF 1951–44, INV 5362 (IDs)
- Jean-Baptiste Mauzaisse (1784–1844 ), 20 artworks: RF 765, RF 1946-8 (IDs)
- Constance Mayer (1775–1821), 3 artworks: INV 6584, INV 6585 (IDs)
- Alexis Joseph Mazerolle (1826–1889), 1 artwork: DL 1979-7 (ID)
- Alessandro Mazzola (1533–1608), 1 artwork: MI 609 (ID)
- Girolamo Mazzola Bedoli (c. 1505 – c. 1569 ), 1 artwork: INV 389 (ID)
- Parmigianino (1503–1540), 1 artwork: RF 1992 411 (ID)
- Ludovico Mazzolino (c. 1480 – c. 1530 ), 1 artwork: INV 390 (ID)
- Domenico di Pace Beccafumi (1484–1551), 3 artworks: RF 1966–3, RF 1966-2 (IDs)
- Jan Miel (1599–1664), 4 artworks: INV 1451, INV 1450 (IDs)
- Jan Vermeer van Utrecht (1630–1695), 1 artwork: INV 1452 (ID)
- Hendrick de Meijer (1620–1689), 1 artwork: RF 1939-16 (ID)
- Jean-Louis-Ernest Meissonier (1815–1891), 9 artworks: RF 1867, RF 1870 (IDs)
- Luis Egidio Meléndez (1716–1780 ), 2 artworks: RF 3849, RF 2537 (IDs)
- Charles Mellin (c. 1600 – 1649), 1 artwork: RF 1985-81 (ID)
- Hans Memling (1430–1494), 8 artworks: INV 1453; INV 1454, RF 1993-1 (IDs)
- François Guillaume Menageot (1744–1816), 2 artworks: INV 6601, RF 1963-4 (IDs)
- Giustino Menescardi (1720–1776), 1 artwork: RF 318 (ID)
- Anton Raphael Mengs (1728–1779), 2 artworks: RF 1997–24, INV 1455 (IDs)
- Philippe Mercier (c. 1689 – 1760), 4 artworks: MI 1125, RF 1582 (IDs)
- Léonor Mérimée (1757–1836), 1 artwork: INV 20090 (ID)
- Paul Merwart (1855–1902), 1 artwork: RF 1961–94 (ID)
- Antonello da Messina (1430–1479), 2 artworks: RF 1992–10, MI 693 (IDs)
- Gabriël Metsu (1629–1667), 8 artworks: RF 373, INV 1465 (IDs)
- Adam Frans van der Meulen (1632–1690), 15 artworks: INV 1513, RF 1961–91 (IDs)
- Pieter Meulener (1602–1654), 1 artwork: INV 1578 (ID)
- Charles Meynier (1768–1832), 8 artworks: INV 6625, RF 1984-22 (IDs)
- Achille Etna Michallon (1796–1822), 31 artworks: INV 6632, RF 2889 (IDs)
- Piotr Michałowski (1800–1855 ), 1 artwork: DL 1961-1 (ID)
- Théobald Michau (1676–1765), 2 artworks: RF 1987–33, RF 1987-33 (IDs)
- Georges Michel (painter) (1763–1843 ), 1 artwork: RF 388 (ID)
- Michele di Matteo Lambertini (active 1447–1469), 1 artwork: RF 30 (ID)
- Jean Michelin (1616–1670), 3 artworks: RF 1938–62, RF 1946-16 (IDs)
- Michiel Jansz. van Mierevelt (1567–1641), 4 artworks: RF 2133, RF 2133 (IDs)
- Frans van Mieris the Elder (1635–1681), 2 artworks: INV 1547, INV 1546 (IDs)
- Willem van Mieris (1662–1747), 4 artworks: INV 1548, INV 1552 (IDs)
- Pierre Mignard (1612–1695), 10 artworks: RF 1989–8, RF 1989-8 (IDs)
- Abraham Mignon (1640–1679), 5 artworks: INV 1554, INV 1553 (IDs)
- Jean-François Millet (1814–1875 ), 7 artworks: MI 165, RF 1439 (IDs)
- Charles Moench (1784–1867), 1 artwork: INV 5418 (ID)
- Louise Moillon (1609–1696), 3 artworks: RF 1982–21, RF 1938–50 (IDs)
- Isaac Moillon (1614–1673), 1 artwork: RF 1996-11 (ID)
- Pieter van Mol (1599–1650), 2 artworks: INV 1577, MI 941 (IDs)
- Antonio della Mola (?-1532) and Paolo della Mola (?-1545), 8 artworks: INV 399, INV 330 (IDs)
- Jean-Baptiste Mole (1616–1661), 1 artwork: RF 1949-25 (ID)
- Hendrick Mommers (1623–1693), 1 artwork: INV 2161 (ID)
- Joos de Momper (1564–1635), 4 artworks: INV 1116, INV 1104 (IDs)
- Domenico Mondo (1723–1806), 1 artwork: RF 1980-44 (ID)
- Claude Monet (1840–1926), 3 artworks: RF 1961 62, RF 1961 61 (IDs)
- Louis de Moni (1698–1771), 1 artwork: INV 1580 (ID)
- Jean-Baptiste Monnoyer (1636–1699), 2 artworks: INV 6742; D 1416, MI 1089 (IDs)
- Antoine Monnoyer (1670–1747), 1 artwork: INV 6734 (ID)
- Jan van Amstel (c1500-1540), 2 artworks: RF 773, INV 1980 (IDs)
- Nicolas-André Monsiau (1754–1837), 3 artworks: RF 1983–104, RF 186 (IDs)
- Antoine-Alphonse Montfort (1802–1884), 9 artworks: RF 2312, RF 2634 (IDs)
- Adolphe Joseph Thomas Monticelli (1824–1886), 4 artworks: RF 3747, RF 1961–64 (IDs)
- Henri d'Ainecy, Comte de Montpezat (1817–1859), 1 artwork: INV 6779 (ID)
- Raymond Monvoisin (1794–1870), 1 artwork: INV 6802 (ID)
- Carel de Moor (1655–1738), 1 artwork: INV 1581 (ID)
- Antonis Mor (1520–1576), 2 artworks: INV 1583, INV 1582 (IDs)
- Luis de Morales (c. 1509/1520 – c. 1586 ), 1 artwork: RF 1996-20 (ID)
- Louis-Gabriel Moreau (1740–1806), 3 artworks: RF 827, RF 20 (IDs)
- Paulus Moreelse (1571–1638), 1 artwork: RF 1959-29 (ID)
- Alessandro Moretto (1494–1554), 2 artworks: INV 123, INV 122 (IDs)
- George Morland (1763–1804), 2 artworks: RF 1990–25, RF 1711 (IDs)
- Giovanni Battista Moroni (1525–1578), 1 artwork: RF 532 (ID)
- John Hamilton Mortimer (1740–1779), 1 artwork: RF 2439 (ID)
- Jan Mostaert (1465–1553), 1 artwork: MI 802 (ID)
- Victor Mottez (1809–1897), 5 artworks: RF 3657 verso, RF 3657 recto (IDs)
- Frederik de Moucheron (1633–1686), 2 artworks: RF 1970–48, INV 1586 (IDs)
- Anton Mozart (1595–1620), 1 artwork: RF 2069 (ID)
- Charles Louis Muller (1815–1892 ), 14 artworks: RF 1996–8, RF 1996-7 (IDs)
- Marco Terenzio de Muller Shongor (1865–1938), 1 artwork: RF 1976-6 (ID)
- William Mulready (1786–1863), 1 artwork: RF 306 (ID)
- Francesco de Mura (1696–1782), 1 artwork: RF 1972-39 (ID)
- Bartolomé Esteban Murillo (1617–1682), 10 artworks: RF 1985–27, RF 1964-1 (IDs)
- Pietro della Vecchia (1603–1678), 1 artwork: INV 740 (ID)
- Girolamo Muziano (1528/1532–1592 ), 1 artwork: INV 20237 (ID)

== N ==
- Matthijs Naiveu (1647–1721), 1 artwork: RF 1990-28 (ID)
- Herman Naiwincx (1623–1670), 1 artwork: RF 2855 (ID)
- Charles-Joseph Natoire (1700–1777), 4 artworks: RF 2223, INV 6845 (IDs)
- Jean-Marc Nattier (1685–1766), 9 artworks: RF 1962–20, RF 1962-20 (IDs)
- Frans de Neve (1606–1681), 5 artworks: RF 1996–2, RF 1987-3 (IDs)
- Pieter Neeffs I (1568–1656), 5 artworks: INV 1598, INV 1598 (IDs)
- Pieter Neeffs II (1620–1659), 2 artworks: INV 1597, INV 1596 (IDs)
- Eglon van der Neer (1634–1703), 2 artworks: INV 1603, INV 1602 (IDs)
- Aert van der Neer (1603–1677), 2 artworks: INV 1601, INV 1600 (IDs)
- Neroccio di Bartolomeo de' Landi (1447–1500 ), 1 artwork: RF 1939 (ID)
- Caspar Netscher (1639–1684), 3 artworks: INV 1605, INV 1605 (IDs)
- Constantijn Netscher (1668–1723), 1 artwork: INV 1608 (ID)
- Elias van Nijmegen (1667–1755), 1 artwork: MI 1018 (ID)
- Isaak van Nickelen (1632–1702), 1 artwork: INV 1668 (ID)
- Giuseppe De Nittis (1846–1884), 1 artwork: RF 372 (ID)
- Anne-Baptiste Nivelon (1754–1771), 1 artwork: INV 6285 (ID)
- Martin Noblet (active 1576), 1 artwork: RF 1938–49 (ID)
- Francesco Noletti (1611–1654), 1 artwork: MI 891 (ID)
- Reinier Nooms (1623–1664), 3 artworks: RF 1939–18, RF 3727 (IDs)
- Jan van Noordt (1623–1681), 2 artworks: RF 1985–25, RF 1973-3 (IDs)
- Pedro Nuñez de Villavicencio (1644–1700 ), 1 artwork: RF 2139 (ID)
- Carlo Francesco Nuvolone (1608–1665 ), 1 artwork: INV 709 (ID)

== O ==
- François Octavien (1682–1740), 1 artwork: INV 6993 (ID)
- Marco d'Oggiono (c. 1475 – 1530 ), 2 artworks: RF 878, INV 705 (IDs)
- Michel-Barthélémy Ollivier (1712–1784), 1 artwork: INV 7007 (ID)
- Balthasar Paul Ommeganck (1755–1826), 2 artworks: INV 1671, INV 1670 (IDs)
- Crescenzio Onofri (1632–1698), 1 artwork: INV 900 (ID)
- Jacob van Oost (1603–1671), 1 artwork: INV 1930 BIS (ID)
- Jacob van Oost the Younger (1639–1713), 1 artwork: INV 1672 (ID)
- Jacob Cornelisz van Oostsanen (1472–1533), 1 artwork: RF 1945-20 (ID)
- John Opie (1761–1807), 1 artwork: RF 307 (ID)
- Deodato di Orlandi (1284–1315), 1 artwork: RF 1945 21 (ID)
- Bernard van Orley (1490–1541), 2 artworks: RF 1976–1, RF 1473 (IDs)
- Jan van Os (1744–1808), 3 artworks: RF 3707, INV 1678 (IDs)
- Adriaen van Ostade (1610–1685), 16 artworks: MI 951, MI 951 (IDs)
- Isaac van Ostade (1621–1649), 6 artworks: MI 952, MI 950 (IDs)
- Jean-Baptiste Oudry (1686–1755), 7 artworks: DL 1970–16, RF 1989-26 (IDs)
- Jacques Charles Oudry (1720–1778 ), 1 artwork: RF 1942-9 (ID)
- Pierre Justin Ouvrié (1806–1879), 1 artwork: INV 20858 (ID)
- Alessandro Varotari (1588–1649), 1 artwork: INV 730 (ID)

== P ==
- Michele Pagano (c. 1697 – 1732), 1 artwork: INV 8811 (ID)
- Amable Louis Claude Pagnest (1790–1819), 2 artworks: INV 7077, MI 789 (IDs)
- Augustin Pajou (1730–1809), 2 artworks: RF 727, RF 1964-5 (IDs)
- Anthonie Palamedesz. (1601–1673), 6 artworks: RF 914, RF 2878 (IDs)
- Palma il Giovane (1546–1628), 4 artworks: RF 2110, MI 877 (IDs)
- Antonio Palma (c. 1510 – 1575 ), 1 artwork (attributed): INV 120 (ID)
- Palma Vecchio (1479–1528), 1 artwork: INV 402 (ID)
- Marco Palmezzano (c. 1459 – c. 1539), 1 artwork: MI 680 (ID)
- Giovanni Paolo Pannini (1691–1765), 13 artworks: RF 1983–65, RF 1944-22 (IDs)
- Juan Pantoja de la Cruz (1553–1608), 1 artwork: RF 3817 (ID)
- Pietro Paolini (1603–1681), 1 artwork: RF 1981-44 (ID)
- Giovanni di Paolo (c. 1403 – 1482), 1 artwork: RF 672 (ID)
- Paolo Uccello (1396–1475), 1 artwork: MI 469 (ID)
- Dominique Papety (1815–1849), 1 artwork: RF 1982-27 (ID)
- Bernardo Parentino (1437–1531), 1 artwork: MI 592 (ID)
- Joseph Parrocel (1646–1704), 1 artwork: INV 7089 (ID)
- Charles Parrocel (1688–1752), 2 artworks: INV 7123, INV 7123 (IDs)
- Jules Pasqualini (1820–1886), 1 artwork: INV 20413 (ID)
- Bartolomeo Passarotti (1529–1592), 1 artwork: RF 1941-10 (ID)
- Giuseppe Passeri (1654–1714), 1 artwork: RF 1997-23 (ID)
- Pierre-Antoine Patel (1648–1707), 3 artworks: DL 1970–17, INV 7134 (IDs)
- Pierre Patel (1605–1676), 7 artworks: RF 1989–27, RF 1989-27 (IDs)
- Joachim Patinir (1480–1524), 1 artwork: RF 2429 (ID)
- Jean-Baptiste Pater (1695–1736), 6 artworks: MI 1098, MI 1097 (IDs)
- Giovanni Antonio Pellegrini (1675–1741), 5 artworks: RF 1983–66, RF 1964-4 (IDs)
- Georg Pencz (1500–1550), 1 artwork: INV 1691 (ID)
- Gianfrancesco Penni (1488–1528), 1 artwork: INV 603 (ID)
- Luca Penni (1500–1556), 2 artworks: RF 1973–49, INV 445 (IDs)
- Jean Perréal (1450–1530), 2 artworks: RF 1993–20, RF 1993-8 (IDs)
- François Perrier (painter) (1590–1650), 3 artworks: INV 7161, INV 7163 (IDs)
- Jean-Charles Nicaise Perrin (1754–1831), 1 artwork: INV 7167 (ID)
- Jean-Baptiste Perronneau (1715–1783), 4 artworks: RF 1937–8, RF 1937-8 (IDs)
- Romain Cazes (1810–1881), 2 artworks: INV 3032, INV 3032 (IDs)
- Pietro Perugino (1446–1523), 9 artworks: RF 957, RF 370 (IDs)
- Francesco Pesellino (1422–1457), 2 artworks: MI 504, INV 418 (IDs)
- Antoine Pesne (1683–1757), 1 artwork: INV 7173 (ID)
- Alexander le Petit (1612–1659), 1 artwork: INV 1384 (ID)
- Giuseppe Antonio Petrini (1677 – c. 1756), 1 artwork: RF 1991-2 (ID)
- Jean-François Pierre Peyron (1744–1814 ), 3 artworks: INV 20429, INV 7179 (IDs)
- Julie Philipault (1780–1834), 1 artwork: INV 7204 (ID)
- Henry Wyndham Phillips (1820–1868), 1 artwork: RF 1156 (ID)
- Giovanni Battista Piazzetta (1682–1754), 1 artwork: INV 20022 (ID)
- Giovanni Battista Pittoni (1687–1767), 8 artwork: (ID)
- Nicolaes Eliaszoon Pickenoy (1588–1655), 5 artworks: MI 940, MI 940 (IDs)
- François-Édouard Picot (1786–1868), 6 artworks: RF 1984–23, INV 7211 (IDs)
- Lorenzo Monaco (1370–1423), 3 artworks: RF 965, MI 381 (IDs)
- Jean-Baptiste Marie Pierre (1714–1789), 4 artworks: RF 1984–28, RF 2385 (IDs)
- Simone Pignoni (1611–1698), 1 artwork: RF 1998-4 (ID)
- Jean-Baptiste Pillement (1728–1808), 1 artwork: RF 1983-80 (ID)
- Édouard Pils (1823–1850 ), 1 artwork: RF 1938–77 (ID)
- Jan Pynas (1582–1631), 1 artwork: RF 1983-3 (ID)
- Pinturicchio (1452–1513), 1 artwork: MI 574 (ID)
- Giulio Romano (1499–1546), 6 artworks: INV 424, INV 657 (IDs)
- Pisanello (1395–1455), 1 artwork: RF 766 (ID)
- Camille Pissarro (1830–1903), 2 artworks: RF 1961 67, RF 1961–66 (IDs)
- Giambattista Pittoni (1687–1767), 5 artworks: RF 1983–67, RF 1971-11 (IDs)
- Nicolas de Plattemontagne (1631–1706), 1 artwork: MI 320 (ID)
- Johann Georg Platzer (1704–1761), 2 artworks: RF 1939–21, RF 1939-20 (IDs)
- Egbert van der Poel (1621–1664), 4 artworks: RF 2884, RF 1509 (IDs)
- Cornelius van Poelenburgh (1595–1667), 12 artworks: RF 1993–14, RF 1943-9 (IDs)
- Charles Poerson (1609–1667), 2 artworks: RF 3982, RF 3982 (IDs)
- Andrea Lanzani (1641–1712), 2 artworks: MI 884, INV 745 (IDs)
- Polidoro da Caravaggio (1499–1543), 1 artwork: INV 135 (ID)
- Paolo Porpora (1617-1670s), 1 artwork: RF 1969-1 (ID)
- Frans Post (1612–1680), 8 artworks: INV 1729, INV 1728 (IDs)
- Hendrik Gerritsz Pot (1585–1657), 1 artwork: INV 1730 (ID)
- Henri Hippolyte Poterlet (1803–1835), 1 artwork: INV 7269 (ID)
- Paulus Potter (1625–1654), 4 artworks: MI 777, MI 199 (IDs)
- Frans Pourbus the younger (1569–1622), 6 artworks: INV 1712, INV 1708 (IDs)
- Frans Pourbus the Elder (1545–1581), 1 artwork: RF 3049 (ID)
- Nicolas Poussin (1594–1665), 40 artworks: INV 7276, RF 1979-58 (IDs)
- Giulio Cesare Procaccini (1574–1625), 2 artworks: RF 1987–13, RF 2105 (IDs)
- Jan Provoost (1462–1529), 4 artworks: RF 1989–35, RF 1472 (IDs)
- Pierre-Paul Prud'hon (1758–1823), 32 artworks: DL 1970–18, RF 1988-14 (IDs)
- Rose Marie Pruvost (1897–?), 2 artworks: RF 1948–25, RF 1948-24 (IDs)
- K. Lucjan Przepjorski (1830-after 1898), 1 artwork: RF 1960-4 (ID)
- François Puget (1651–1707), 2 artworks: INV 7346, INV 7345 (IDs)
- Pierre Puvis de Chavannes (1824–1898), 1 artwork: RF 1961–68 (ID)
- Adam Pynacker (1622–1673), 3 artworks: RF 1981–10, RF 709 (IDs)
- Jacob Pynas (1592–1650), 1 artwork: INV 1269 (ID)

== Q ==
- Martin Ferdinand Quadal (1736–1808), 2 artworks: RF 1962–6, RF 1962-7 (IDs)
- Enguerrand Quarton (1420–1466), 1 artwork: RF 1569 (ID)
- Pieter Quast (1606–1647), 1 artwork: MI 904 (ID)
- François Quesnel (1543–1619), 1 artwork: RF 3964 (ID)
- Augustin Quesnel (1595–1661), 2 artworks: RF 1953–18, RF 1952-8 (IDs)
- Pierre-Antoine Quillard (1701–1733 ), 2 artworks: RF 2624, RF 2625 (IDs)
- Noël Quillerier (1594–1669), 1 artwork: INV 2608 (ID)

== R ==
- Henry Raeburn (1756–1823), 5 artworks: RF 1995–9, RF 1962-15 (IDs)
- Auguste Raffet (1804–1860), 4 artworks: RF 664, RF 2329 (IDs)
- Francesco Raibolini (1450–1517), 3 artworks: RF 2101, MI 679 (IDs)
- Giacomo Francia (1486–c.1557), 1 artwork: RF 1286 (ID)
- Giovanni Battista Ramenghi (1521–1601), 1 artwork: INV 20217 (ID)
- Allan Ramsay (1713–1784 ), 2 artworks: RF 1936–23, RF 358 (IDs)
- Jean Raoux (1677–1734), 3 artworks: RF 1990–16, MI 1100 (IDs)
- Raphael (1483–1520), 18 artworks: RF 341, RF 648 (IDs)
- Félix Ravaisson-Mollien (1813–1900), 1 artwork: RF 3784 (ID)
- Jan Antonisz. van Ravesteyn (1572–1657), 2 artworks: MI 956, MI 955 (IDs)
- Victor Ravet (1840–1895), 1 artwork: RF 1975-15 (ID)
- Henry Raeburn (1756–1823), 5 artworks: RF 1511, RF 1962-15 (IDs)
- Giovanni Battista Recco (c. 1615 – c. 1660), 1 artwork: RF 1977-11 (ID)
- Odilon Redon (1840–1916), 1 artwork: DL 1992-1 (ID)
- Jean-Baptiste Regnault (1754–1829), 7 artworks: RF 166, INV 7382 (IDs)
- Nicolas Régnier (1588–1667), 1 artwork: INV 366 (ID)
- Jacques Auguste Regnier (1787–1860), 2 artworks: RF 1951–26, INV 7398 (IDs)
- Rembrandt (1606–1669), 23 artworks: DL 1973–19, RF 1948-34 (IDs)
- Jean-Charles-Joseph Rémond (1795–1875), 1 artwork: INV 7409 (ID)
- Pierre-Auguste Renoir (1841–1919), 3 artworks: RF 1961–72, RF 1961–71 (IDs)
- Antoine Renou (1731–1806), 1 artwork: INV 7240 (ID)
- Charles-Caïus Renoux (1795–1846), 1 artwork: INV 7435 (ID)
- Jacques Restout (1650 – c. 1701), 10 artworks: MI 54, INV 7460 (IDs)
- Pierre Révoil (1776–1842), 1 artwork: INV 7473 (ID)
- Marinus van Reymerswaele (1490–1546), 1 artwork: RF 1973-34 (ID)
- Joshua Reynolds (1723–1792), 1 artwork: RF 1580 (ID)
- Guido Reni (1575–1642), 17 artworks: INV 541, INV 541 (IDs)
- Jusepe de Ribera (1590–1656), 4 artworks: RF 125, MI 893 (IDs)
- Louis Gustave Ricard (1823–1873), 1 artwork: RF 1687 (ID)
- Sebastiano Ricci (1659–1734), 5 artworks: RF 1986–73, RF 1989-28 (IDs)
- Fleury-François Richard (1777–1852), 2 artworks: RF 1995–6, INV 7479 (IDs)
- Jules Richomme (1818–1903), 1 artwork: RF 3144 (ID)
- Léon Riesener (1767–1805), 4 artworks: RF 1985–43, RF 1970-37 (IDs)
- Hyacinthe Rigaud (1659–1743), 16 artworks: MI 1106, INV 7499 (IDs)
- Jules Rigo (1810–1892), 1 artwork: INV 20559 (ID)
- Bernaert de Rijckere (c1535-1590), 1 artwork: RF 1961-48 (ID)
- Gerard Rijsbrack (1696–1773), 3 artworks: INV 1827, INV 1826 (IDs)
- Pietro da Rimini (1324–1338), 1 artwork: RF 2287 (ID)
- Ludger Tom Ring the younger (1522–1584), 1 artwork: RF 2283 (ID)
- Louis-Édouard Rioult (1790–1855), 2 artworks: INV 7602, INV 20023 (IDs)
- Antoine Rivalz (1667–1735), 1 artwork: INV 20008 (ID)
- Hubert Robert (1733–1808), 33 artworks: INV 7657, RF 1983-82 (IDs)
- Joseph-Nicolas Robert-Fleury (1797–1890), 3 artworks: RF 567, RF 566 (IDs)
- Arthur Henry Roberts (1819–1900), 1 artwork: MI 861 (ID)
- David Roberts (1796–1864 ), 1 artwork: RF 1994-12 (ID)
- Gabriel Robin (1902–1977), 1 artwork: RF 1979-49 (ID)
- Michele Rocca (1675–1751 ), 2 artworks: RF 1997–26, RF 1997-25 (IDs)
- Henryk Rodakowski (1823–1894), 1 artwork: RF 912 (ID)
- Jørgen Roed (1808–1888), 1 artwork: RF 1980-47 (ID)
- Adolphe Roehn (1780–1857), 1 artwork: RF 1988-52 (ID)
- Eugène Roger (1807–1840), 1 artwork: INV 20557 (ID)
- Roelant Roghman (1627–1692), 1 artwork: RF 921 (ID)
- Franz Wolfgang Rohrich (1787–1834 ), 1 artwork: INV 1185 (ID)
- Henri-Horace Roland Delaporte (c. 1724 – 1793), 4 artworks: RF 1982–78, RF 1979-1 (IDs)
- Benjamin de Rolland (1773–1855), 1 artwork: INV 7704 (ID)
- Alfred Roller (1797–1866), 1 artwork: MI 729 (ID)
- Giovanni Francesco Romanelli (1610–1662), 7 artworks: INV 20351, INV 20350 (IDs)
- Girolamo Romani (c. 1484 – c. 1560 ), 1 artwork: RF 1984-1 (ID)
- Adèle Romany (1769–1846), 1 artwork: RF 1985 44 (ID)
- Theodoor Rombouts (1597–1637), 1 artwork: RF 2861 (ID)
- Willem Romeyn (1624–1693), 1 artwork: INV 1755 (ID)
- George Romney (1734–1802 ), 2 artworks: RF 1095, RF 1095 (IDs)
- Jacques Ignatius de Roore (1686–1747), 1 artwork: RF 1995-1 (ID)
- Salvator Rosa (1615–1673), 5 artworks: INV 586, INV 586 (IDs)
- Nicolaas Roosendael (1634–1686), 1 artwork: RF 3717 (ID)
- Alexander Roslin (1718–1793), 3 artworks: MI 175, RF 1716 (IDs)
- Cosimo Rosselli (1439–1507), 1 artwork: INV 592 (ID)
- Mariano Rossi (1731–1807), 1 artwork: RF 1997-33 (ID)
- Pasquale Rossi (1641–1725 ), 2 artworks: INV 260, INV 260 (IDs)
- Georges Rouget (1783–1869), 2 artworks: RF 1289, INV 20279 (IDs)
- Jean Sébastien Rouillard (1789–1852), 1 artwork: RF 228 (ID)
- Théodore Rousseau (1812–1867 ), 22 artworks: RF 2002–18, RF 1954-26 (IDs)
- Henri Royer (1869–1938), 1 artwork: INV 20606 (ID)
- Peter Paul Rubens (1577–1640), 53 artworks: DL 1973–16, RF 1977-13 (IDs)
- Jacob Isaacksz van Ruisdael (1628–1682), 7 artworks: RF 1527, RF 1527 (IDs)
- Salomon van Ruysdael (1602–1670), 6 artworks: RF 1965–16, RF 1950-48 (IDs)
- Giovan Battista Ruoppolo (1629–1693 ), 1 artwork: INV 595 ter (ID)
- Giuseppe Ruoppolo (1631–1710), 2 artworks: MI 865, MI 864 (IDs)
- Carl Borromäus Andreas Ruthart (1630–1703 ), 1 artwork: INV 1823 (ID)

== S ==
- Georg Saal (1818–1870), 1 artwork: RF 2374 (ID)
- Lorenzo Sabatini (c. 1520 – 1576), 1 artwork: INV 596 (ID)
- Jacques Sablet (1749–1803), 2 artworks: INV 7804, RF 3728 (IDs)
- Andrea Sacchi (1599–1661), 1 artwork: INV 598 (ID)
- Pieter Jansz. Saenredam (1597–1665), 1 artwork: RF 1983-100 (ID)
- Herman Saftleven (1609–1685), 1 artwork: INV 1974 (ID)
- Gabriel de Saint-Aubin (1724–1780), 4 artworks: RF 1993–9, RF 1981 19 (IDs)
- Gillot Saint-Evre (1791–1858), 1 artwork: INV 7816 (ID)
- Simon Saint-Jean (1808–1860 ), 1 artwork: RF 927 (ID)
- Antoine Sallaert (1580–1650), 1 artwork: RF 1990-11 (ID)
- Francesco de' Rossi (Il Salviati) (1509–1563), 1 artwork: INV 593 (ID)
- Orazio Samacchini (1532–1577), 1 artwork: INV 4637 (ID)
- Alonso Sánchez Coello (1531–1588), 5 artworks: MI 810, MI 809 (IDs)
- Sano di Pietro (1405/1406–1481 ), 5 artworks: MI 474, MI 473 (IDs)
- Jean-Baptiste Santerre (1658–1717), 1 artwork: INV 7836 (ID)
- Dirck van Santvoort (1610–1680), 1 artwork: INV 1828 (ID)
- Carlo Saraceni (1579–1620), 1 artwork: RF 1974-18 (ID)
- Andrea del Sarto (1486–1530), 3 artworks: INV 712, INV 713 (IDs)
- Giovanni Battista Salvi da Sassoferrato (1609–1685), 5 artworks: INV 600, MI 630 (IDs)
- Piat Joseph Sauvage (1744–1818), 1 artwork: RF 1985–89 (ID)
- Roelant Savery (1576–1639), 1 artwork: RF 2224 (ID)
- Girolamo Savoldo (c. 1480 – c. 1548 ), 2 artworks: INV 885, INV 659 (IDs)
- Vittore Carpaccio (1465–1527), 1 artwork: INV 181 (ID)
- Scarsellino (1551–1620), 2 artworks: RF 3824, INV 701 (IDs)
- Cornelis Symonsz van der Schalcke (1617–1671), 1 artwork: RF 1951-1 (ID)
- Godfried Schalcken (1643–1706), 3 artworks: INV 1832, INV 1831 (IDs)
- Jean-Frédéric Schall (1752–1825), 2 artworks: RF 1961–75, INV 7850 (IDs)
- Bartolomeo Schedoni (1578–1615), 2 artworks: INV 661, INV 661 (IDs)
- Ary Scheffer (1795–1858), 9 artworks: MI 209, RF 1224 (IDs)
- Taco Jan Scheltema (1831–1867), 1 artwork: RF 1588 (ID)
- Henri-Guillaume Schlesinger (1814–1893), 1 artwork: RF 1982-70 (ID)
- Thea Schleusner (1879–1964), 1 artwork: INV 20 727 (ID)
- Jean-Victor Schnetz (1787–1870), 3 artworks: INV 7884, INV 7901 (IDs)
- Johann Heinrich Schönfeld (1609–1683), 1 artwork: RF 1995-11 (ID)
- Hendrik Willem Schweickhardt (1747–1797), 1 artwork: INV 1837 (ID)
- Louis Auguste, Baron de Schwiter (1805–1889), 2 artworks: RF 3738, INV 20219 (IDs)
- Jan van Scorel (1495–1562), 1 artwork: RF 120 (ID)
- Hippolyte Sebron (1801–1879), 2 artworks: RF 1950–10, INV 7916 (IDs)
- Daniel Seghers (1590–1661), 2 artworks: RF 1990–24, INV 1976 (IDs)
- Daniel Seiter (1647–1705), 1 artwork: RF 1997-30 (ID)
- Vincent Sellaer (active 1538-1544-after 1544), 2 artworks: RF 1981–45, RF 1981-45 (IDs)
- Jacopo da Sellaio (c. 1441 – 1493 ), 2 artworks: RF 1274, MI 500 (IDs)
- Pierre Asthasie Theodore Senties (1801-?), 1 artwork: INV 20689 (ID)
- Domingos Sequeira (1768–1837 ), 1 artwork: RF 1979-29 (ID)
- Giovanni Serodine (1600–1630), 1 artwork: RF 1983-4 (ID)
- Cesare da Sesto (1477–1523 ), 1 artwork: INV 785 (ID)
- Gilbert de Sève (1615–1698), 6 artworks: INV 7317, INV 8769 (IDs)
- Christian Seybold (c. 1690 – 1768), 1 artwork: INV 1839 (ID)
- Jan Siberechts (1627–1703), 1 artwork: RF 1025 (ID)
- Xavier Sigalon (1787–1837), 4 artworks: RF 2401, RF 2676 (IDs)
- Émile Signol (1804–1892), 1 artwork: RF 1520 (ID)
- Luca Signorelli (1441–1523), 4 artworks: INV 670, RF 2062 (IDs)
- Louis de Silvestre (1675–1760), 3 artworks: RF 1956–4, RF 1956-4 (IDs)
- Francesco Simonini (1686–c.1755 ), 1 artwork: INV 20024 (ID)
- Henry Singleton (painter) (1766–1839 ), 2 artworks: RF 1984–155, RF 2543 (IDs)
- Giovanni Andrea Sirani (1610–1670), 1 artwork: RF 3828 (ID)
- Alfred Sisley (1839–1899), 3 artworks: RF 1961–78, RF 1961–77 (IDs)
- Michael Sittow (1469–1525), 1 artwork: RF 1966-11 (ID)
- Pieter Cornelisz van Slingelandt (1640–1691), 4 artworks: INV 1841, RF 758 (IDs)
- Peter Snayers (1592–1666), 2 artworks: INV 2009, INV 1843 (IDs)
- Frans Snyders (1579–1657), 8 artworks: MI 982, MI 980 (IDs)
- Pieter Snyers (1681–1752), 1 artwork: RF 3710 (ID)
- Frederik Sodring (1809–1862), 1 artwork: RF 1995-2 (ID)
- Andrea Solari (c. 1465 – 1524 ), 6 artworks: INV 827, RF 1978-35 (IDs)
- Francesco Solimena (1657–1743), 2 artworks: RF 1983–68, INV 676 (IDs)
- Pieter Soutman (1580–1657), 1 artwork: RF 426 (ID)
- Olivio Sozzi (1696–1765), 1 artwork: RF 1978-2 (ID)
- Leonello Spada (1576–1622), 3 artworks: INV 681, INV 680 (IDs)
- Cornelis van Spaendonck (1756–1839), 2 artworks: INV 1857, RF 2853 (IDs)
- Lo Spagna (d1529), 7 artworks: INV 814, INV 20244 (IDs)
- Louis Sparre (1863–1964), 1 artwork: INV 20698 (ID)
- Hans Speckaert (1540–1581), 1 artwork: RF 1987-1 (ID)
- Carl Spitzweg (1808–1885), 1 artwork: RF 1988-53 (ID)
- Bartholomeus Spranger (1546–1611), 1 artwork: RF 3955 (ID)
- Jacob van Spreeuwen (1590–1610), 1 artwork: INV 1862 (ID)
- Adriaan van Stalbemt (1580–1660), 1 artwork: INV 1098 (ID)
- Jan Steen (1626–1679), 3 artworks: RF 301, MI 983 (IDs)
- Hendrik van Steenwijk II (1580–1649), 5 artworks: INV 1868, INV 1867 (IDs)
- Stefano di Giovanni (1374–1451), 4 artworks: RF 1965–2, RF 1981-57 (IDs)
- Jacques Stella (1596–1657), 4 artworks: INV 7970, INV 7967 (IDs)
- Charles de Steuben (1788–1856), 2 artworks: INV 7976, INV 7972 (IDs)
- Alfred Stevens (painter) (1823–1906 ), 1 artwork: RF 1968-15 (ID)
- Nicolaes de Helt Stockade (1614–1669), 1 artwork: MI 929 (ID)
- Matthias Stom (1600–1650), 2 artworks: RF 2810, INV 1363 (IDs)
- Abraham Storck (1644–1708), 1 artwork: RF 3713 (ID)
- Sebastian Stoskopff (1597–1657), 2 artworks: RF 1982–22, RF 1981-18 (IDs)
- Stradanus (1523–1605), 1 artwork: RF 1980-42 (ID)
- Lorentz Strauch (1564–1630), 2 artworks: MI 816, MI 815 (IDs)
- William Scrots (1537–1553), 1 artwork: RF 561 (ID)
- Bernardo Strozzi (1581–1644), 3 artworks: RF 1978–50, RF 1961–92 (IDs)
- Gilbert Stuart (1755–1828), 1 artwork: RF 1960-2 (ID)
- George Stubbs (1724–1806), 1 artwork: RF 1973–94 (ID)
- Pierre Subleyras (1699–1749), 14 artworks: RF 1985–80, RF 1983–84 (IDs)
- Justus Sustermans (1597–1681), 1 artwork: RF 2124 (ID)
- Lambert Sustris (1515–1591), 4 artworks: INV 1978, INV 8570 (IDs)
- Joseph-Benoît Suvée (1743–1807), 3 artworks: INV 8075, RF 1969-11 (IDs)
- Herman van Swanevelt (1604–1655), 5 artworks: INV 1870, INV 1875 (IDs)
- Jacques François Joseph Swebach-Desfontaines (1769–1823 ), 2 artworks: RF 3053, RF 2400 (IDs)
- Michiel Sweerts (1618–1664), 2 artworks: RF 1967–11, INV 1441 (IDs)

== T ==
- Jean-Joseph Taillasson (1745–1809), 1 artwork: INV 8081 (ID)
- Hugues Taraval (1729–1785 ), 3 artworks: INV 8088, INV 8089 (IDs)
- Nicolas-Henry Tardieu (1674–1749), 1 artwork: INV 8107 (ID)
- Jean-Pierre-Antoine Tassaert (1727–1788), 9 artworks: RF 1976–73, RF 3806 (IDs)
- Jean Tassel (1608–1667), 2 artworks: RF 3969, RF 1952-23 (IDs)
- Nicolas Antoine Taunay (1755–1830 ), 1 artwork: RF 1938–65 (ID)
- Abraham Lambertsz van den Tempel (1622–1672), 1 artwork: RF 903 (ID)
- Jan Tengnagel (1584–1635), 1 artwork: RF 2246 (ID)
- David Teniers the Younger (1610–1690), 42 artworks: INV 1892, INV 1890 (IDs)
- David Teniers the Elder (1582–1649), 1 artwork: RF 1972-11 (ID)
- Hendrick ter Brugghen (1588–1629), 1 artwork: RF 1954-1 (ID)
- Amédée Ternante-Lemaire (1821–1866), 1 artwork: INV 1715 (ID)
- El Greco (1541–1614), 3 artworks: RF 1941–32, RF 1713 (IDs)
- Charles Thevenin (1764–1838), 1 artwork: INV 20126 (ID)
- Jan Thomas van Ieperen (1617–1673), 1 artwork: MI 973 (ID)
- René Thomsen (1897–1976), 1 artwork: RF 1946-5 (ID)
- Theodoor van Thulden (1606–1669), 4 artworks: RF 1986–5, INV 1905 (IDs)
- Alessandro Tiarini (1577–1668), 1 artwork: INV 689 (ID)
- Giovanni Battista Tiepolo (1696–1770), 14 artworks: RF 1983–69, RF 1971-8 (IDs)
- Louis Simon Tiersonnier (1713–1773), 1 artwork: INV 8166 (ID)
- Tintoretto (1518–1594), 10 artworks: MI 881, RF 2113 (IDs)
- Domenico Tintoretto (1560–1635 ), 2 artworks: MI 1219, RF 2109 (IDs)
- Jean-Baptiste-Ange Tissier (1814–1876), 2 artworks: RF 1982–64, DL 1989-1; MV 5435 (IDs)
- James Tissot (1836–1902), 2 artworks: RF 3774, RF 3774 (IDs)
- Titian (1485–1576), 15 artworks: INV 747, INV 773 (IDs)
- Louis Tocqué (1696–1772), 7 artworks: INV 8174, INV 8177 (IDs)
- Henri de Toulouse-Lautrec (1864–1901), 1 artwork: RF 1961–82 (ID)
- Nicolas Tournier (1590 – c. 1638), 2 artworks: INV 20007, RF 1938-102 (IDs)
- Pierre Toutain (1645–1686), 1 artwork: INV 8199 (ID)
- Gaspare Traversi (c. 1722 – 1770), 2 artworks: RF 1990–2, RF 1990-1 (IDs)
- Francesco Trevisani (1656–1746), 4 artworks: RF 1997–21, RF 1939 12 (IDs)
- Luis Tristan (1586–1624), 2 artworks: RF 3698, RF 240 (IDs)
- François de Troy (1645–1730), 3 artworks: RF 1957–11, RF 2469 (IDs)
- Jean François de Troy (1679–1752), 7 artworks: INV 8225, RF 1990-18 (IDs)
- Constant Troyon (1810–1865), 15 artworks: RF 1962–23, RF 1461 (IDs)
- Félix Trutat (1824–1848), 1 artwork: INV 20127 (ID)
- Cosmè Tura (c. 1430 – 1495), 2 artworks: MI 486, MI 485 (IDs)
- Alessandro Turchi (1578–1649), 4 artworks: INV 597, INV 597 (IDs)
- J. M. W. Turner (1775–1851), 1 artwork: RF 1967-2 (ID)
- Lancelot-Théodore Turpin de Crissé (1782–1859), 1 artwork: MI 233; 5579 (1916) (ID)

== U ==
- Ugolino di Nerio (1295–1347), 1 artwork: RF 1986-56 (ID)
- Jacob van der Ulft (1627–1690), 2 artworks: INV 1909, INV 1908 (IDs)
- Cristopher Unterberger (1732–1798), 1 artwork: RF 1997-22 (ID)
- Adriaen van Utrecht (1599–1652), 2 artworks: MI 1017, MI 932 (IDs)
- Jacob van Utrecht (1479–1525), 1 artwork: RF 2091 (ID)

== V ==
- Lodewijk de Vadder (1605–1655), 2 artworks: RF 1939 25, INV 2163 (IDs)
- Eugène Lawrence Vail (1857–1934), 1 artwork: INV 20428 (ID)
- Wallerant Vaillant (1623–1677), 2 artworks: RF 2562, MI 1364 (IDs)
- Frederik van Valckenborch (1566–1623), 1 artwork: RF 2432 (ID)
- Lucas van Valckenborch (1540–1597), 1 artwork: RF 2427 (ID)
- Pierre-Henri de Valenciennes (1750–1819), 127 artworks: RF 2982, RF 2998 (IDs)
- Valentin de Boulogne (1591–1632), 6 artworks: INV 8255, INV 8253 (IDs)
- Théodore Valério (1819–1879), 1 artwork: INV 20586 (ID)
- Anne Vallayer-Coster (1744–1818), 5 artworks: DL 1977–19, RF 1992-410 (IDs)
- Nanine Vallain (1767–1815), 1 artwork: INV 8258 (ID)
- Jacques-Antoine Vallin (c.1760–after 1831), 1 artwork: RF 2394 (ID)
- Francesco Vanni (1563–1610), 1 artwork: INV 707 (ID)
- Turino Vanni (1348–1438), 1 artwork: INV 711 (ID)
- Quentin Varin (1584–1647), 1 artwork: RF 2830 (ID)
- Jules Varnier (active 1839–1842), 1 artwork: RF 1939-9 (ID)
- Giorgio Vasari (1511–1574), 1 artwork: INV 732 (ID)
- Otto van Veen (1556–1629), 2 artworks: INV 1997 BIS, INV 1911 (IDs)
- Diego Velázquez (1599–1660), 4 artworks: MI 898, MI 898 (IDs)
- Adriaen van de Velde (1636–1672), 7 artworks: MI 1007, INV 1920 (IDs)
- Willem van de Velde the Younger (1633–1707), 2 artworks: RF 1949–3, INV 1921 (IDs)
- Bartolomeo Veneto (c. 1480 – c. 1546 ), 5 artworks: RF 2485, RF 2485 (IDs)
- Lorenzo Veneziano (1356–1372), 1 artwork: MI 395 (ID)
- Paolo Veneziano (before 1300 – c. 1360), 3 artworks: MI 396 TER, MI 396 BIS (IDs)
- Adriaen van de Venne (1589–1662), 1 artwork: INV 1924 (ID)
- Jan van de Venne (died 1635), 1 artwork: DL 1991-2 (ID)
- Marcello Venusti (c. 1512 – 1579 ), 1 artwork: INV 20278 (ID)
- François Verdier (1651–1730), 1 artwork: RF 3835 (ID)
- Claude Verdot (1667–1733), 1 artwork: INV 8290 (ID)
- Jan Peeter Verdussen (c. 1700 – 1763 ), 1 artwork: INV 8349 (ID)
- Simon Pietersz Verelst (1644–1710), 1 artwork: INV 1927 (ID)
- Jan Verkolje (1650–1693), 1 artwork: INV 1928 (ID)
- Nikolaas Verkolje (1673–1746), 1 artwork: INV 1929 (ID)
- Johannes Vermeer (1632–1675), 2 artworks: RF 1983–28, MI 1448 (IDs)
- Jan Vermeer van Haarlem (1656–1705), 1 artwork: RF 2862 (ID)
- Guy-Louis Vernansal (1648–1729), 1 artwork: INV 8617 (ID)
- Claude Joseph Vernet (1714–1789 ), 18 artworks: INV 8343, RF 1976-21 (IDs)
- Carle Vernet (1758–1836), 3 artworks: INV 8356, INV 8358 (IDs)
- Horace Vernet (1789–1863), 9 artworks: RF 1995–16, RF 126 (IDs)
- Alexandre Veron-Bellecourt (1733–1838), 1 artwork: INV 20137 (ID)
- Paolo Veronese (1528–1588), 16 artworks: INV 144, INV 136 (IDs)
- Bonifazio Veronese (1487–1553 ), 2 artworks: INV 118, INV 118 (IDs)
- Johannes Cornelisz Verspronck (1600–1662), 3 artworks: RF 2135, RF 2135 (IDs)
- Antoine Vestier (1740–1824), 3 artworks: RF 1981–42, RF 139 (IDs)
- Jan Victors (1619–1676), 2 artworks: INV 1286, INV 1285 (IDs)
- Joseph-Marie Vien (1716–1809), 5 artworks: INV 8427, INV 8427 (IDs)
- Louise Élisabeth Vigée Le Brun (1755–1842 ), 8 artworks: INV 3069, MI 694 (IDs)
- Claude Vignon (1593–1670), 5 artworks: RF 3737, RF 3737 (IDs)
- Étienne Villequin (1619–1688), 1 artwork: INV 8447 (ID)
- Marie-Denise Villers (1774–1821), 1 artwork: RF 173 (ID)
- Hyacinthe de Villiers (1816–1879), 1 artwork: INV 20130 (ID)
- Frédéric Villot (1809–1875), 1 artwork: RF 1962-26 (ID)
- François-André Vincent (1746–1816), 7 artworks: RF 1998–5, RF 1983-105 (IDs)
- Auguste Vinchon (1789–1855), 2 artworks: MI 149, MI 150 (IDs)
- Tommaso Vincidor (1493–1536 ), 1 artwork: INV 518 (ID)
- Sebastiano del Piombo (1485–1547), 3 artworks: INV 825, INV 357 (IDs)
- Vincent van der Vinne (1628–1702), 1 artwork: RF 3712 (ID)
- Giovanni Battista Viola (1576–1622 ), 3 artworks: INV 231, INV 208 (IDs)
- Adolphe Etienne Viollet-Le-Duc (1814–1879), 1 artwork: RF 3735 (ID)
- Vitale Da Bologna (before 1309–1359/1361 ), 1 artwork: RF 1996-19 (ID)
- Nicolas Vleughels (1668–1737), 2 artworks: RF 1994–412, INV 8482 (IDs)
- Willem van der Vliet (1584–1642), 2 artworks: RF 956, INV 1861 (IDs)
- Hendrick Cornelisz. van Vliet (1611–1675), 1 artwork: RF 1969 2 (ID)
- Guillaume Voiriot (1713–1799), 1 artwork: INV 8483 (ID)
- Ary de Vois (1641–1680?), 3 artworks: MI 1011, INV 1933 (IDs)
- Antoine Vollon (1833–1900), 2 artworks: Lux 446, RF 1464 (IDs)
- Simon de Vos (1603–1676), 1 artwork: RF 1982 18 (ID)
- Marten de Vos (1532–1603), 1 artwork: INV 1931 (ID)
- Paul de Vos (1593–1678), 4 artworks: INV 1845, INV 1844 (IDs)
- Simon Vouet (1590–1649), 15 artworks: RF 783, DL 1970-19 (IDs)
- Abraham de Vries (painter) (1590–1655), 1 artwork: RF 3719 (ID)
- Arnould de Vuez (1644–1720), 1 artwork: INV 4081 (ID)

== W ==
- Ferdinand Wachsmuth (1802–1869), 1 artwork: INV 20558 (ID)
- Ferdinand Georg Waldmüller (1793–1865), 1 artwork: RF 1986-72 (ID)
- Anthonie Waldorp (1803–1866), 1 artwork: MI 90 (ID)
- Bernard Joseph Wampe (1689–1744), 1 artwork: RF 2517 (ID)
- Louis Étienne Watelet (1780–1866 ), 1 artwork: INV 8517 (ID)
- Antoine Watteau (1684–1721), 14 artworks: RF 1977–447, RF 1990-8 (IDs)
- Louis Joseph Watteau (1731–1798), 1 artwork: RF 1951-43 (ID)
- Frederick W. Watts (1800–1870), 1 artwork: RF 38 (ID)
- Gottfried Wedig (1583–1641), 1 artwork: DL 1970–9; Inv 1774 (ID)
- Jan Baptist Weenix (1621–1661), 1 artwork: INV 1935 (ID)
- Jan Weenix (1640–1719), 5 artworks: RF 1943–7, RF 712 (IDs)
- Adriaen van der Werff (1659–1722), 5 artworks: RF 3709, MI 1012 (IDs)
- Rogier van der Weyden (1400–1464), 2 artworks: RF 2063, INV 1982 (IDs)
- Per Wickenberg (1812–1846), 1 artwork: INV 8527 (ID)
- Jan Wijnants (1632–1684), 4 artworks: INV 1967, RF 2422 (IDs)
- Dirck Wijntrack (1615–1678), 1 artwork: INV 1970 (ID)
- Franz Xaver Winterhalter (1805–1873), 2 artworks: RF 1975–26, RF 2656 (IDs)
- Hermann Winterhalter (1808–1891 ), 1 artwork: RF 1870 (ID)
- Victor Wolfvoet II (1612–1652), 1 artwork: DL 1978-2; 15449 (ID)
- Philips Wouwerman (1619–1668), 15 artworks: INV 1960, RF 1529 (IDs)
- Pieter Wouwerman (1623–1682), 1 artwork: INV 1966 (ID)
- Joseph Wright of Derby (1734–1797), 2 artworks: RF 1985–11, RF 1970-52 (IDs)
- Joachim Wtewael (1566–1638), 2 artworks: RF 1982–51, RF 1979-23 (IDs)
- Johann Melchior Wyrsch (1732–1798 ), 2 artworks: RF 777, RF 776 (IDs)
- Mattheus Wijtmans (1650–1689), 1 artwork: RF 2885 (ID)

== Y ==
- Joseph Yvart (1649–1728), 2 artworks: INV 4057, INV 4056 (IDs)

== Z ==
- Paolo Zacchia the Elder (1490–1561), 2 artworks: MI 610, MI 604 (IDs)
- Cornelis Saftleven (1607–1681), 1 artwork: INV 1975 (ID)
- Giuseppe Zais (1709–1781), 1 artwork: RF 1983-71 (ID)
- Zao Wou Ki (1920–2013 ), 1 artwork: RF 1979-50 (ID)
- Johann Zoffany (1733–1810), 1 artwork: RF 1979-17 (ID)
- Bartholomäus Zeitblom (1450–1519), 1 artwork: RF 2092 (ID)
- Bernardo Zenale (1436–1526), 1 artwork: MI 568 (ID)
- Zenone Veronese (1484–1542), 1 artwork: RF 183 (ID)
- Marco Zoppo (1433–1478 ), 1 artwork: RF 1980-1 (ID)
- Henri Zuber (1844–1909), 1 artwork: RF 455 (ID)
- Ignacio Zuloaga (1870–1945), 2 artworks: RF 1942 36, RF 1942 35 (IDs)
- Francisco de Zurbarán (1598–1664), 3 artworks: MI 724, MI 205 (IDs)
