= Nivelon =

Nivelon may refer to:

- Nivelon I of Pierrefonds (died 1073), lord of Pierrefonds
- Nivelon II of Pierrefonds (died 1102), lord of Pierrefonds
- Nivelon d'Arras (fl. c. 1200), marshal of France
- Nivelon de Quierzy (died 1207), bishop of Soissons
- Nivelon de Bazoches (died 1262), bishop of Soissons
- Anne-Baptiste Nivelon (fl. 1750–1764), French painter in the Louvre
