= Fauchier =

Fauchier is a surname. Notable people with the surname include:

- Adrien Fauchier-Magnan (1873–1963), French tennis player
- Joseph Fauchier (1687-1751), French potter
- Laurent Fauchier (1643–1672), French painter
- Henriette Fauchier (1825–1892), French painter better known as Henriette Gudin
