= Guillaume Chavard =

French cyclist

Personal information
- Born: 23 July 1911
- Died: 9 December 1973 (aged 62)

Cycling career
- Sport: Cycling
- Discipline: Road
- Role: Rider

Guillaume Chavard (23 July 1911 – 9 December 1973) was a French racing cyclist. He rode in the 1936 Tour de France.
