= Master of the Codex of Saint George =

Italian painter

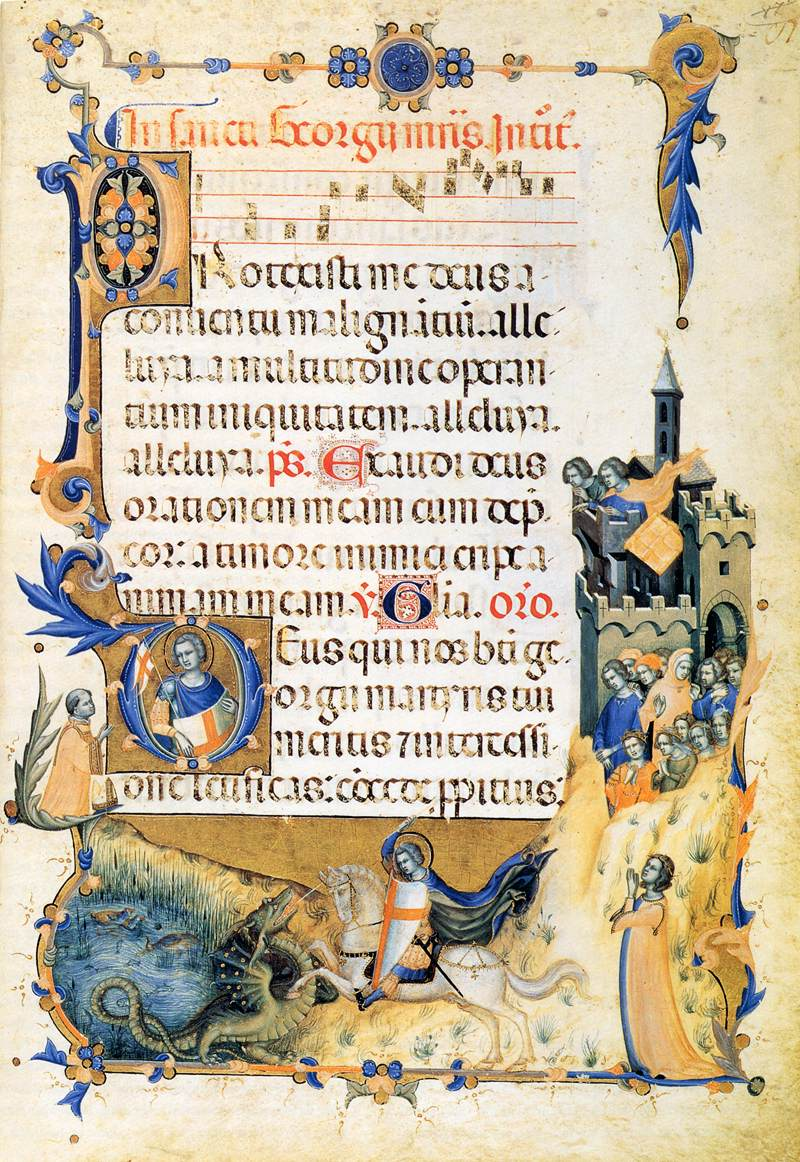
Page from the Codex of Saint George, between 1325 and 1330

The Master of the Codex of Saint George (active c. 1320–1330) is an unknown painter, named after one volume of an illuminated missal, which, in addition to the liturgical texts, also contains a Vita of St. George.

Fragments of another volume of the same missal are in the Pierpont Morgan Library in New York (M.713). The painter was an exponent of the Roman School of Illumination and probably worked both in Rome and in Avignon. The work was commissioned by Cardinal Jacopo Stefaneschi, who resided in Avignon, home of the papal court from 1309. The exceedingly magnificent missal was created around 1320 and was intended for the Basilica of St. Peter in Rome. In addition to the decoration of other manuscripts, panel paintings are also attributed to the artist, but this is disputed.
