= Louis-Auguste Lapito =

French painter (1803–1874)

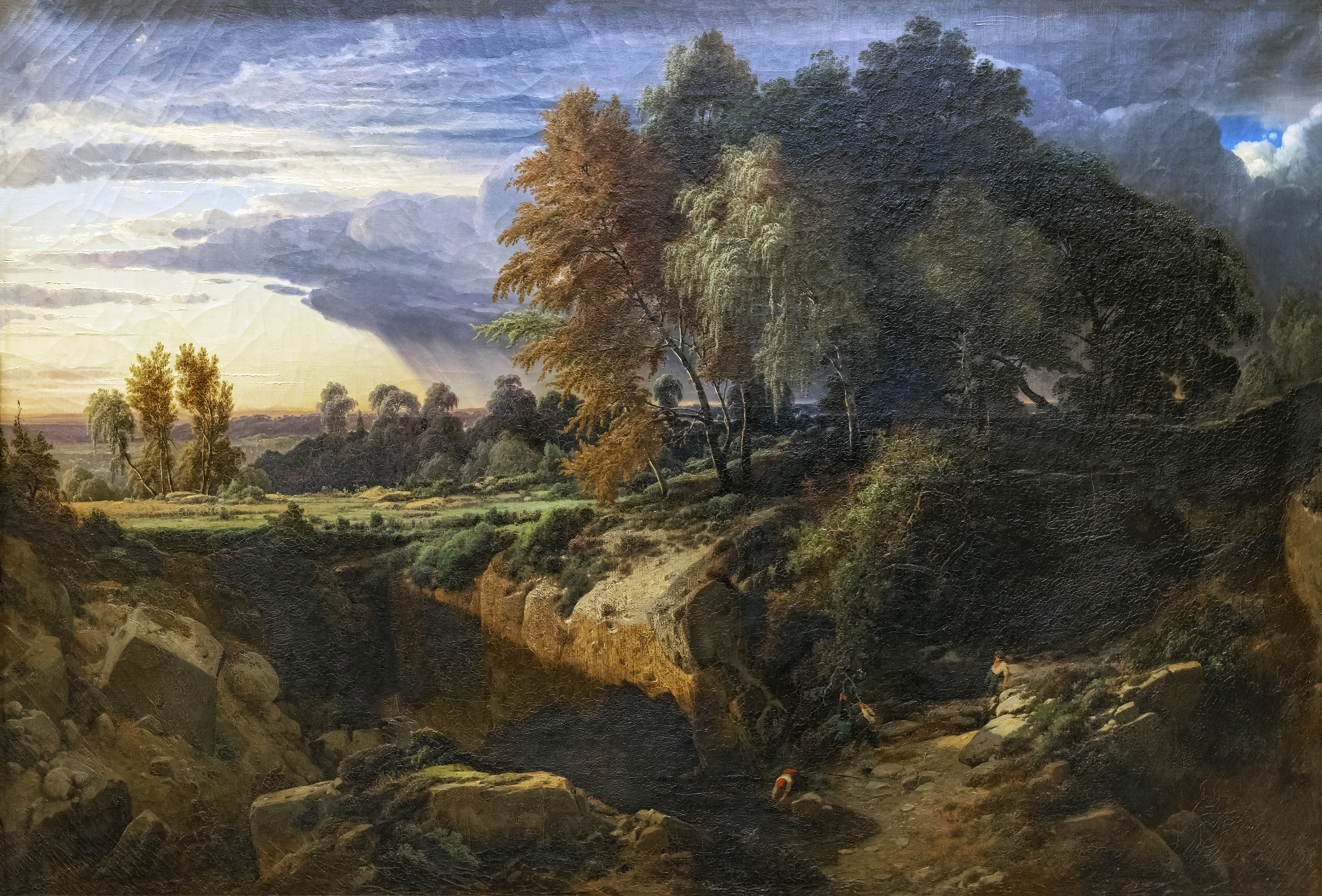
Landscape Musée des Beaux-Arts de Carcassonne

Louis-Auguste Lapito (born Joinville-le-Pont, August 18, 1803 - died Boulogne-sur-Seine, April 7, 1874) was a French painter. He exhibited at many Paris Salons. He was named a Chevalier of the Légion d'honneur in 1836, and a Chevalier of the Order of Leopold as well.
