= Félix Cottrau =

French painter

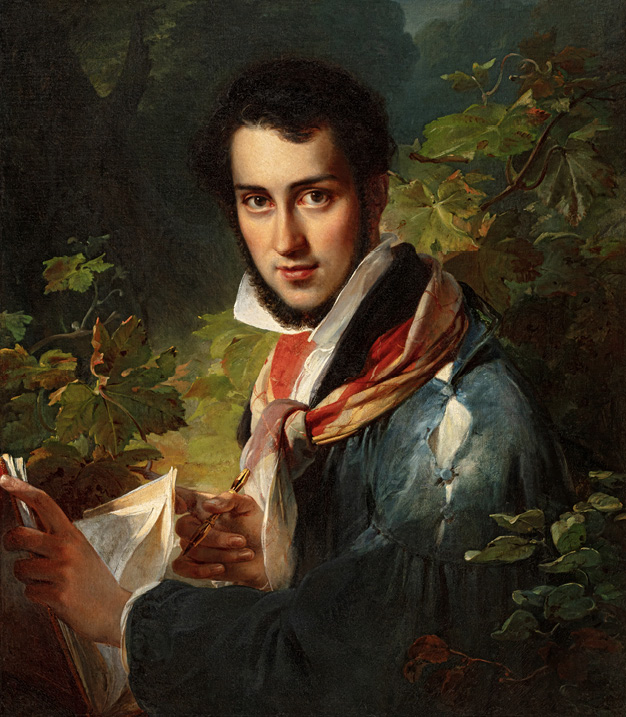
Portrait of Félix Cottrau (1827) by François Bouchot. Rome, private collection.

Pierre-Félix Cottrau (6 March 1799 in Paris – 19 December 1852 in Paris) was a French painter.
