= Jacopo de' Boateri =

Italian painter

Jacopo de' Boateri (active c. 1540) was an Italian painter, considered a follower of Francesco Francia. His works can be seen exhibited at the Galleria Borghese, Rome, Italy and at the Louvre, Paris, France.
