= Frederick W. Watts =

English landscape painter

Frederick W. Watts (7 October 1800 – 4 July 1870) was an English landscape painter influenced by Constable. He has been known as "Frederic William Watts", "Frederick Waters Watts", "William Watts" or "William Frederick Watts".

== Life and work ==
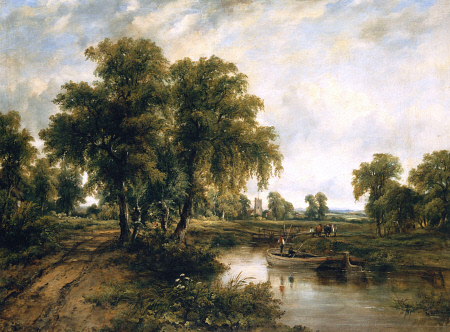
Dedham Vale, Suffolk

There is a sparsity of information about this painter which has cast uncertainty over his parentage, training, and date of death. According to the Oxford Dictionary of National Biography, he was born F. William Watts, in Bath, Somerset on 7 October 1800, and probably baptised, as F. Waters Watts, in St. Albans in Hertfordshire in 1801, the son of William and Mary Watts.

IN 1817, as "William Watts", he is thought to have entered the Royal Academy in London, and won silver medals there between 1819 and 1821. He exhibited at the academy from 1821 to 1860, and at the British Institution from 1823 to 1862. He also showed many paintings at the Suffolk Street Gallery in New Bond Street and at the New Watercolour Society.

Watts lived in Hampstead, London, for much of his life and painted landscapes, "en plein air" all over Britain, having a preference for river scenes. He was strongly influenced by John Constable.

There appears to be some uncertainty over his death with many sources giving it as 1860. However, according to the ODNB, Watts died at home in Hampstead in July 1870, of complications caused by Diabetes.
