= Moïse Jacobber =

French painter

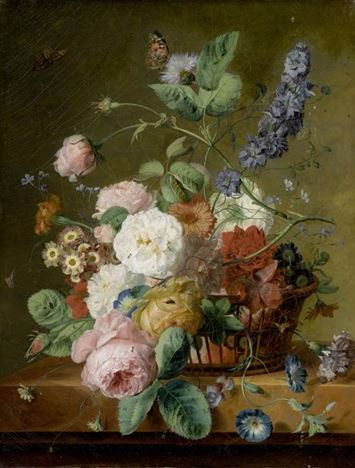
Floral Still-life with Small Insects

Moïse Jacobber, born Jacob Ber (6 March 1786, in Blieskastel – 17 July 1863, in Paris) was a German-born French painter who worked at the Manufacture nationale de Sèvres. He specialized in painting flowers.

== Life and works ==
He studied with Gérard van Spaendonck. From 1823 to 1835, he was a floral painter at the porcelain manufactory in Sèvres. He depicted flowers and fruits in several media, including oils, watercolors and porcelain. He was a frequent exhibitor at the Salon from 1822 to 1855; also holding exhibitions in Lille, Douai, Cambrai and London. He signed his works with a variation of his original name, "Jacob-Ber". Some of his porcelain work was based on paintings by Spaendonck and Jan van Huysum.

Among his major works were two large vases in Sèvres porcelain, which were a gift from King Louis Philippe to Leopold, Grand Duke of Baden in 1833.

Most of his work may be seen at the Cité de la céramique, a museum in Sèvres. Notable oil paintings are in the Louvre and the Musée des Beaux-Arts de Rouen.

His daughter, Élisabeth Sidonie Jaccober (married name Worms), also worked as a floral painter in Sèvres from 1835 to 1839 and, in 1840, obtained a lithographic patent to print her own designs.
