= Laurent Fauchier =

French painter

- Born: 11 March 1643; Aix-en-Provence
- Died: 25 March 1672 (aged 29); Aix-en-Provence

Laurent Fauchier (1643–1672) was a French portrait painter.

== Biography ==
Laurent Fauchier was born in Aix-en-Provence, rue de la Sabaterie (today called rue Laurent Fauchier). He was the son of Balthazar Fauchier and Anne Marguerite Chanvre, who were married in 1638.

He became a pupil of Bernadin Mimault for three years, where he probably met his later teacher Pierre Mignard and his later pupil Pierre Puget. In 1664, he became a portrait painter with his own workshop and was awarded a commission by the city council for 66 portraits, which he did not finish.
