= Salon of 1833 =

1833 art exhibition in Paris

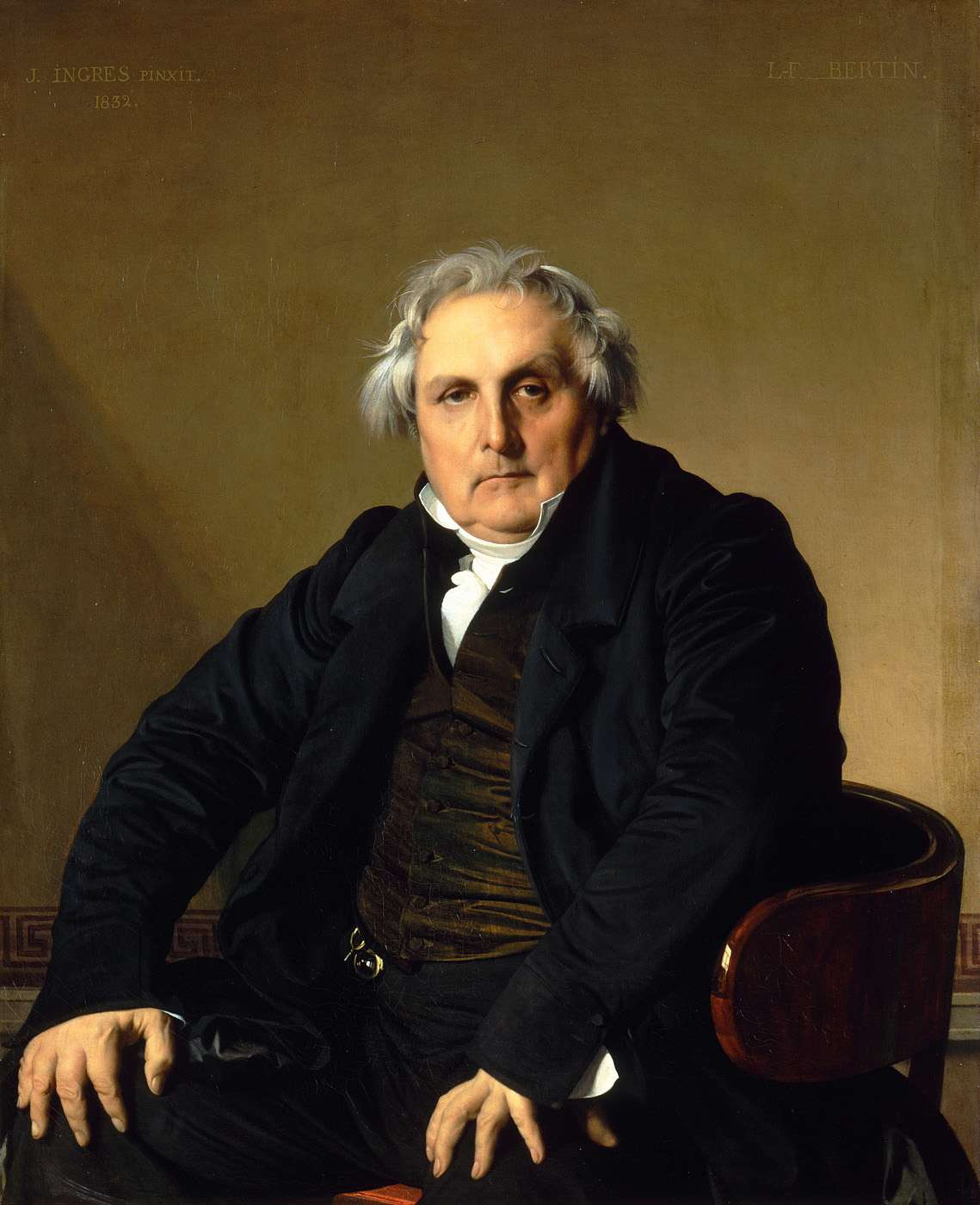
Portrait of Monsieur Bertin by Jean-Auguste-Dominique Ingres

The Salon of 1833 was an art exhibition held at the Louvre in Paris which opened on the 1 March 1833. It was held during the July Monarchy of Louis Philippe I and the first Salon to be staged since the failed Paris Uprising of 1832 against his rule. The critic Heinrich Heine, reviewing the Salon, observed that Jean-Auguste-Dominique Ingres was the dominant figure of the Salon. "Like Louis-Philippe in politics, M. Ingres was this year the king in art: as the former reigned at the Tuileries, he reigned at the Louvre". Eugène Delacroix who had enjoyed success at the Salon of 1831 with Liberty Leading the People, was away in Morocco in 1832 and short of time he submitted a few watercolours and portraits rather than the history paintings he had become known for.

Amongst the works on display was The Nation Is in Danger, a large patriotic painting commissioned by Louis Philippe I from Auguste-Hyacinthe Debay of which only a fragment now survives. Joseph-Désiré Court exhibited his history painting Boissy d'Anglas at the National Convention. Charles Durupt submitted his Henry III watching the Assassination of the Duke of Guise. Horace Vernet showed paintings he had produced while serving as French Academy in Rome including the Portrait of the Marchesa Cunegonda Misciattelli and the history painting Raphael at the Vatican. Théodore Rousseau submitted a landscape painting View near Granville. Leopold Boilly entered a genre painting A Carnival Scene featuring a crowd scene of Paris. Although not fully completed until 1835, Leon Cogniet displayed his depiction of Napoleon's Egyptian expedition, intended for the ceiling of the Louvre.

From 1833 onwards the Salon, which had previously been roughly biannual, was held annually beginning with the Salon of 1834.

== Gallery ==
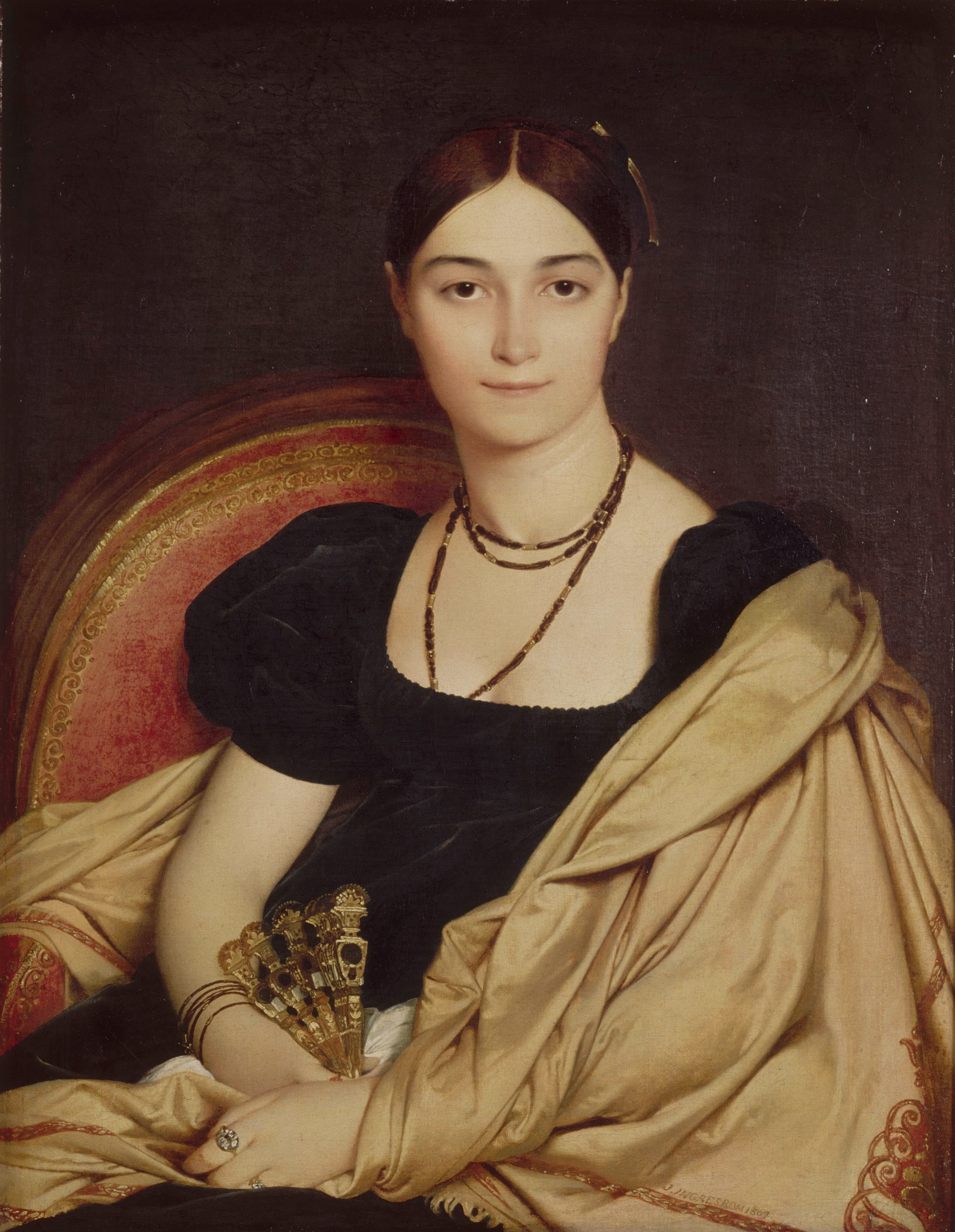
Portrait of Madame Duvaucey by Jean-Auguste-Dominique Ingres

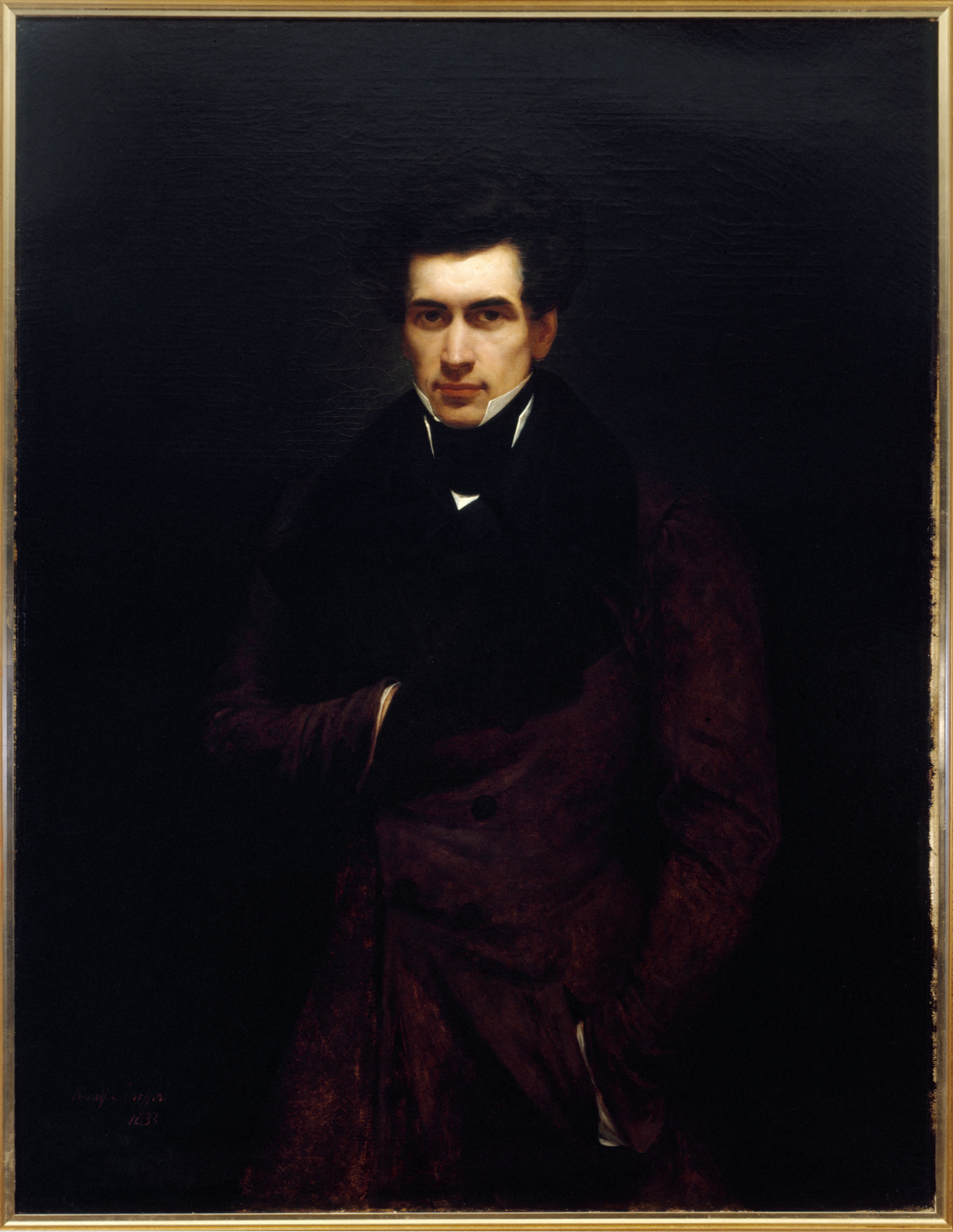
Portrait of Armand Carrel by Hendrik Scheffer

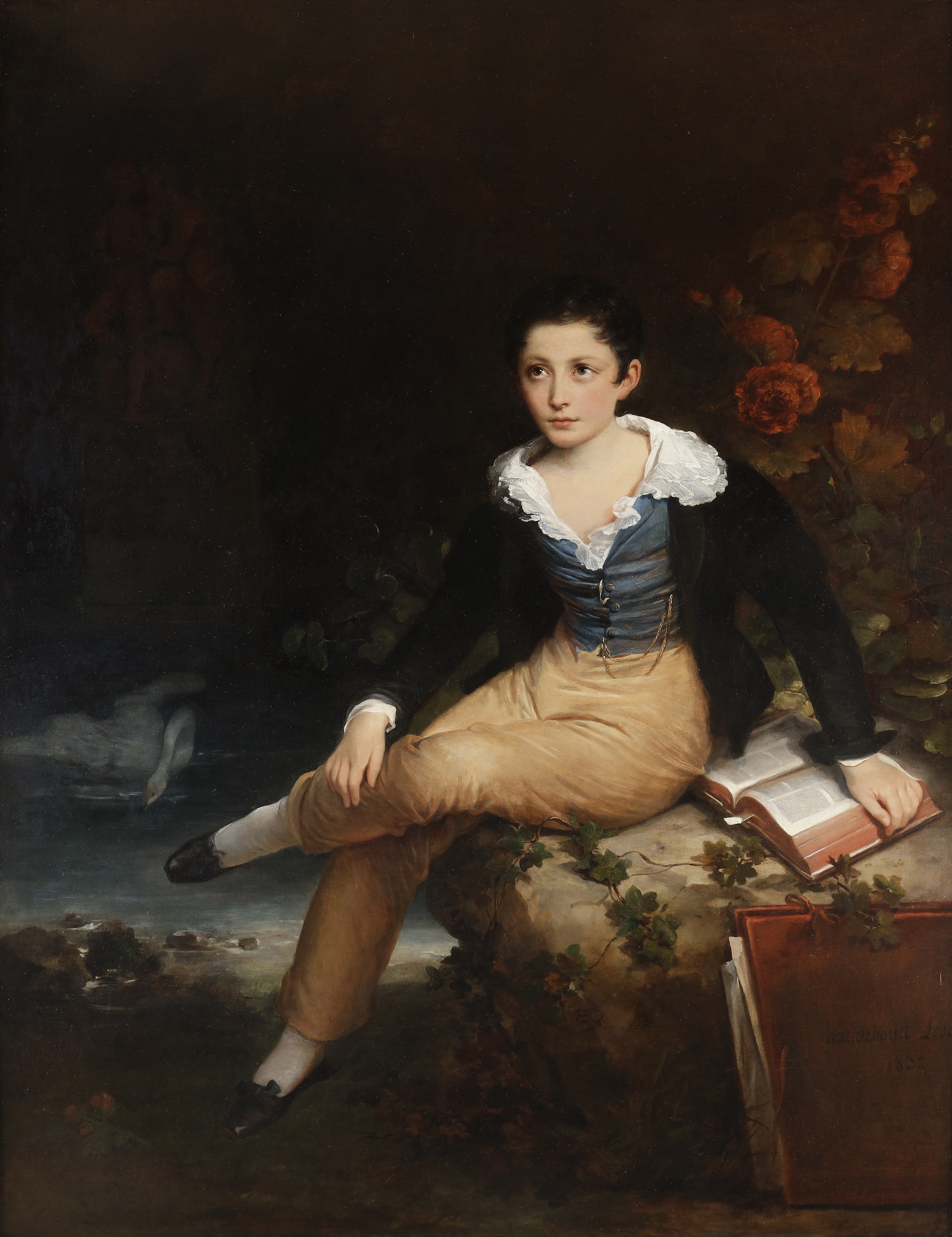
Portrait of Leon Haudebourt by Hortense Haudebourt-Lescot

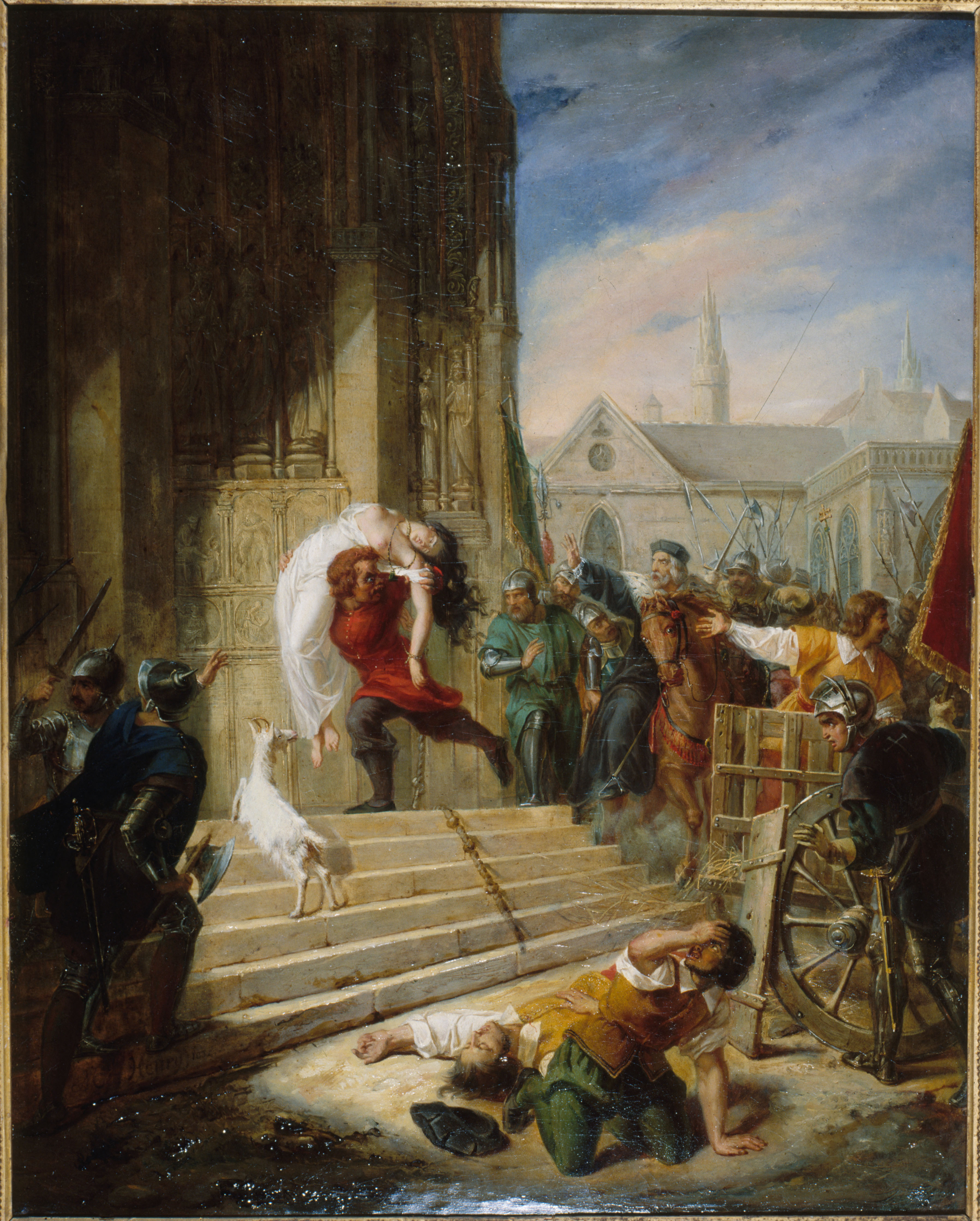
Quasimodo Saving Esmeralda from the Hands of Her Executioners by Eugénie Latil

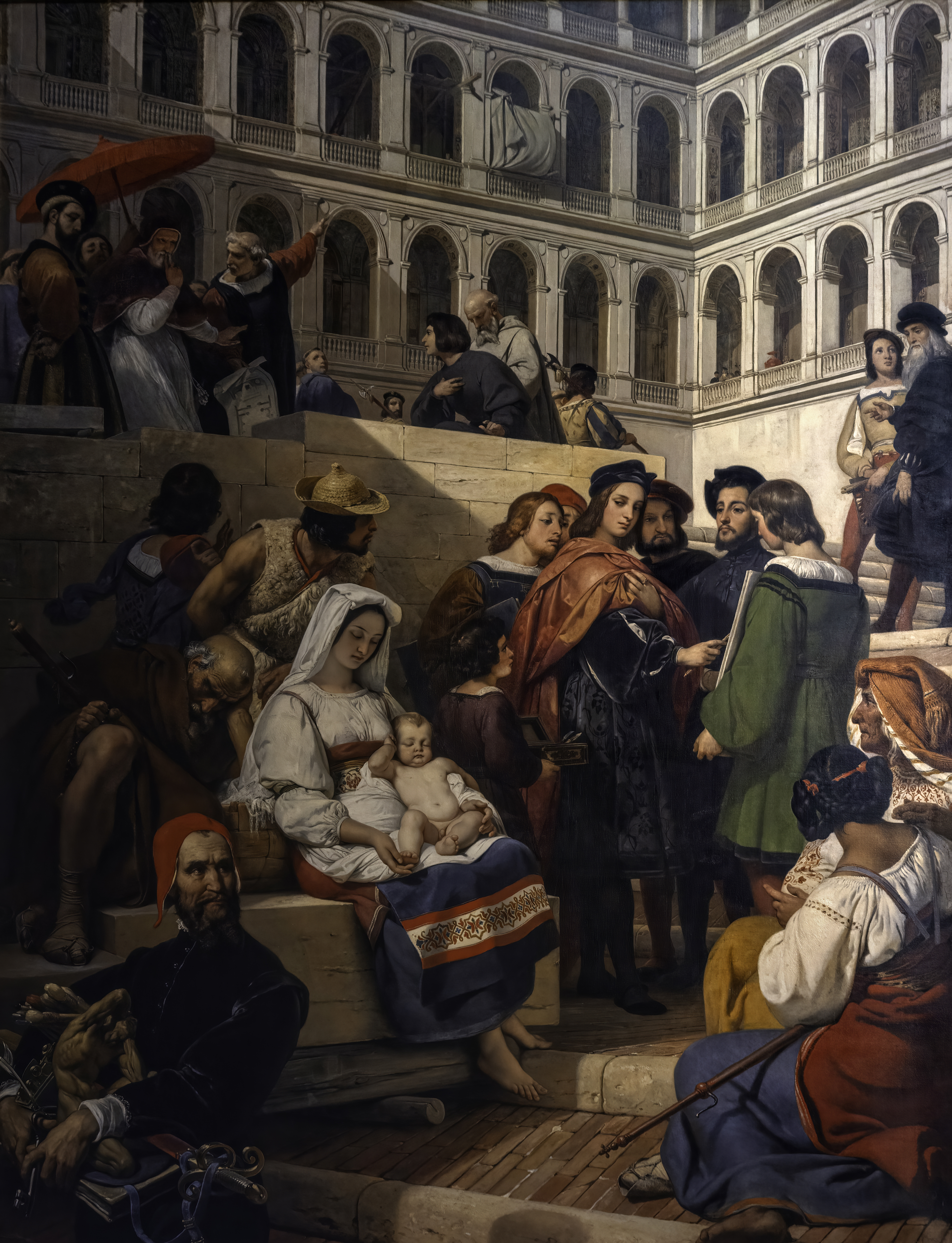
Raphael at the Vatican by Horace Vernet

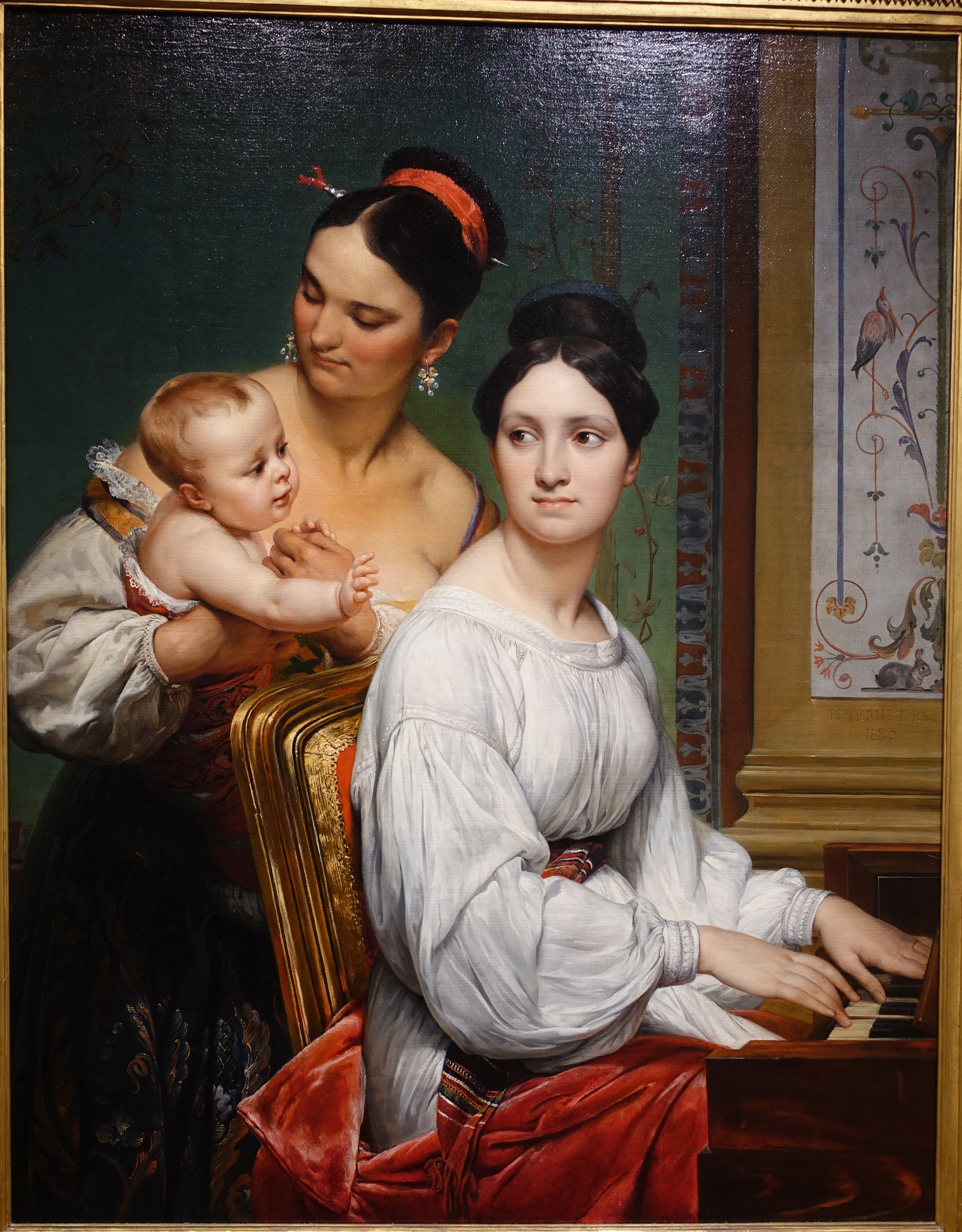
Portrait of the Marchesa Cunegonda Misciattelli by Horace Vernet

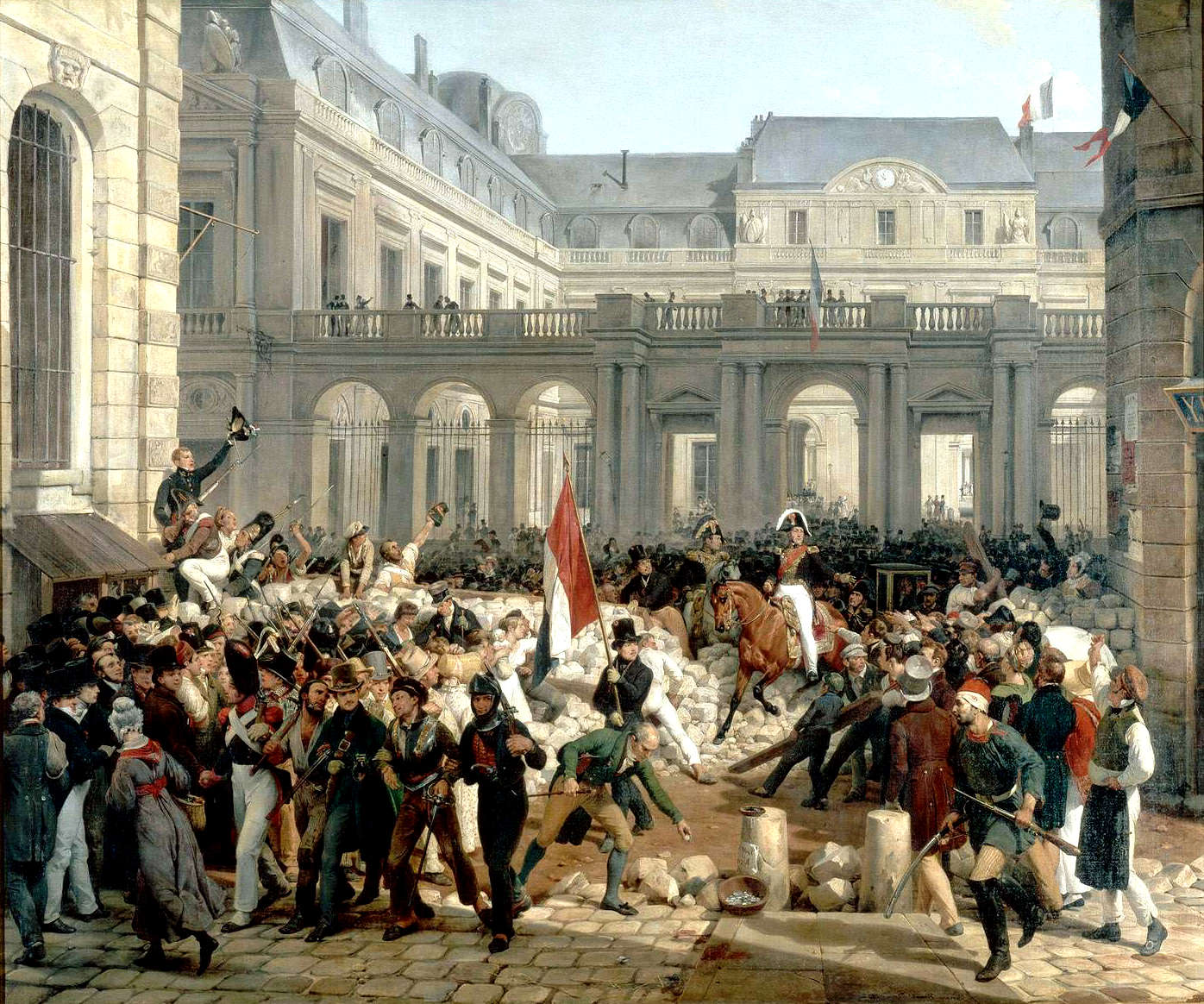
The Duke of Orleans Leaving the Palais-Royal by Horace Vernet

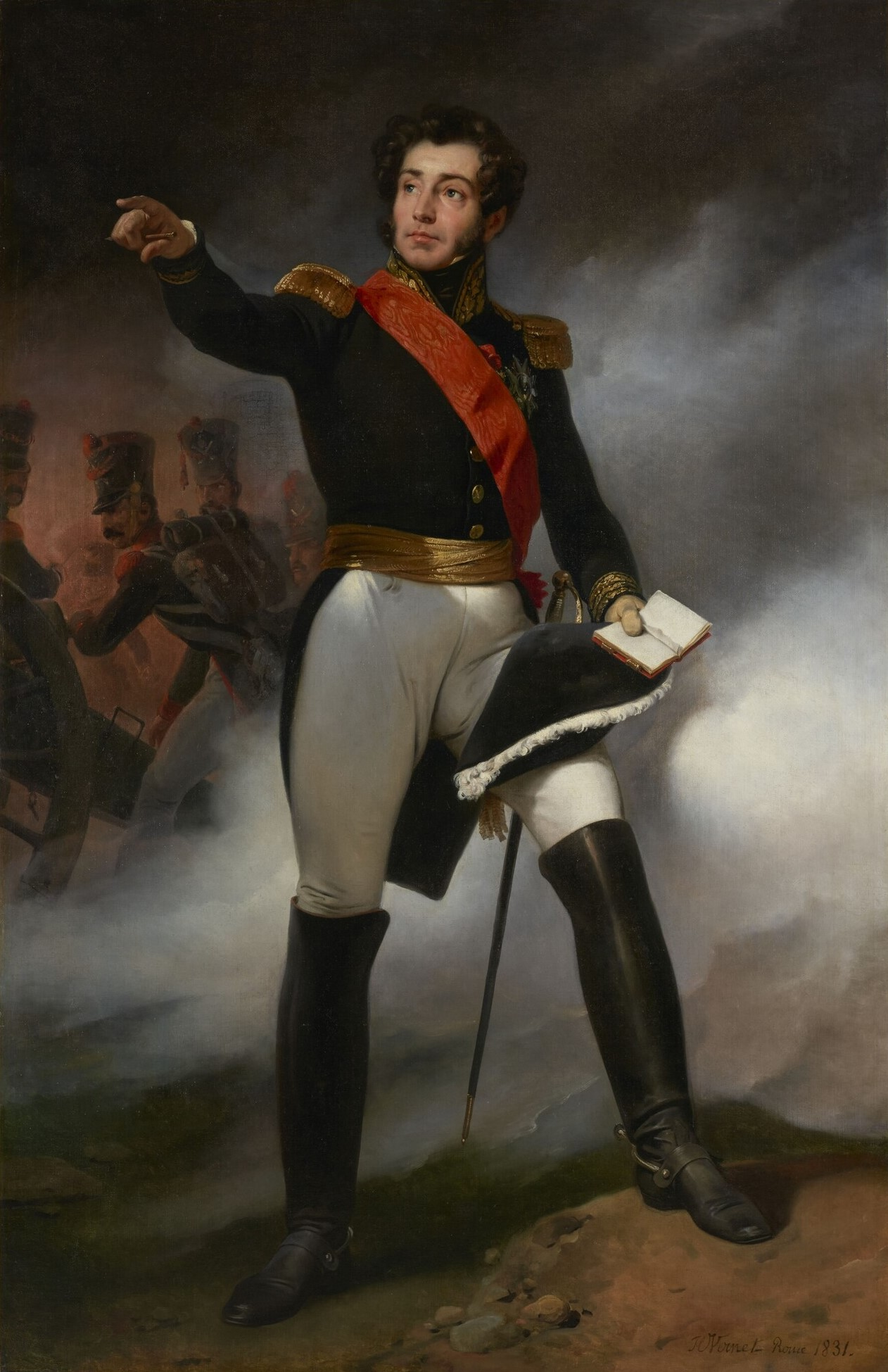
Portrait of Gabriel Jean Joseph Molitor by Horace Vernet

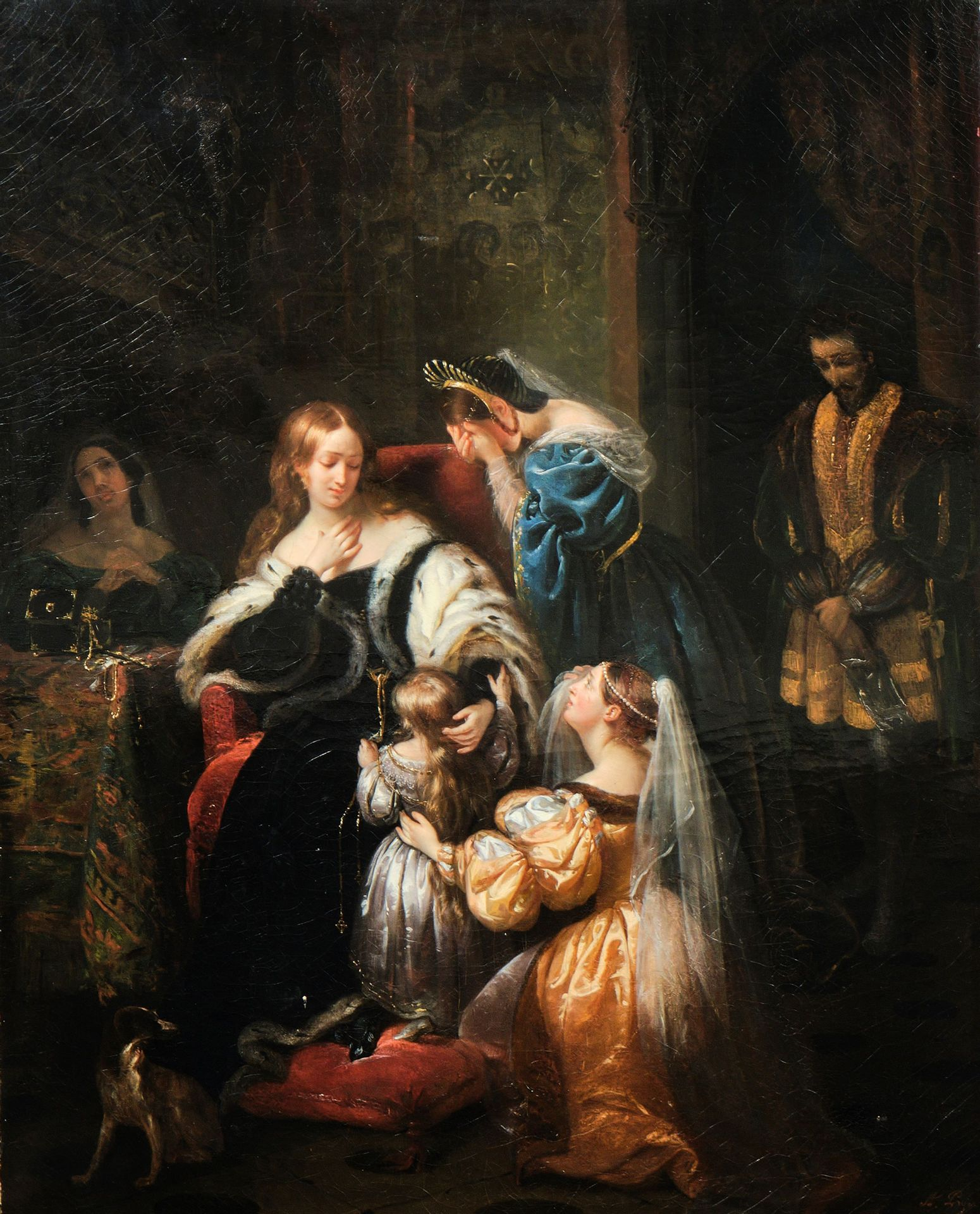
Conviction of Anne Boleyn by Aimée Brune-Pagès

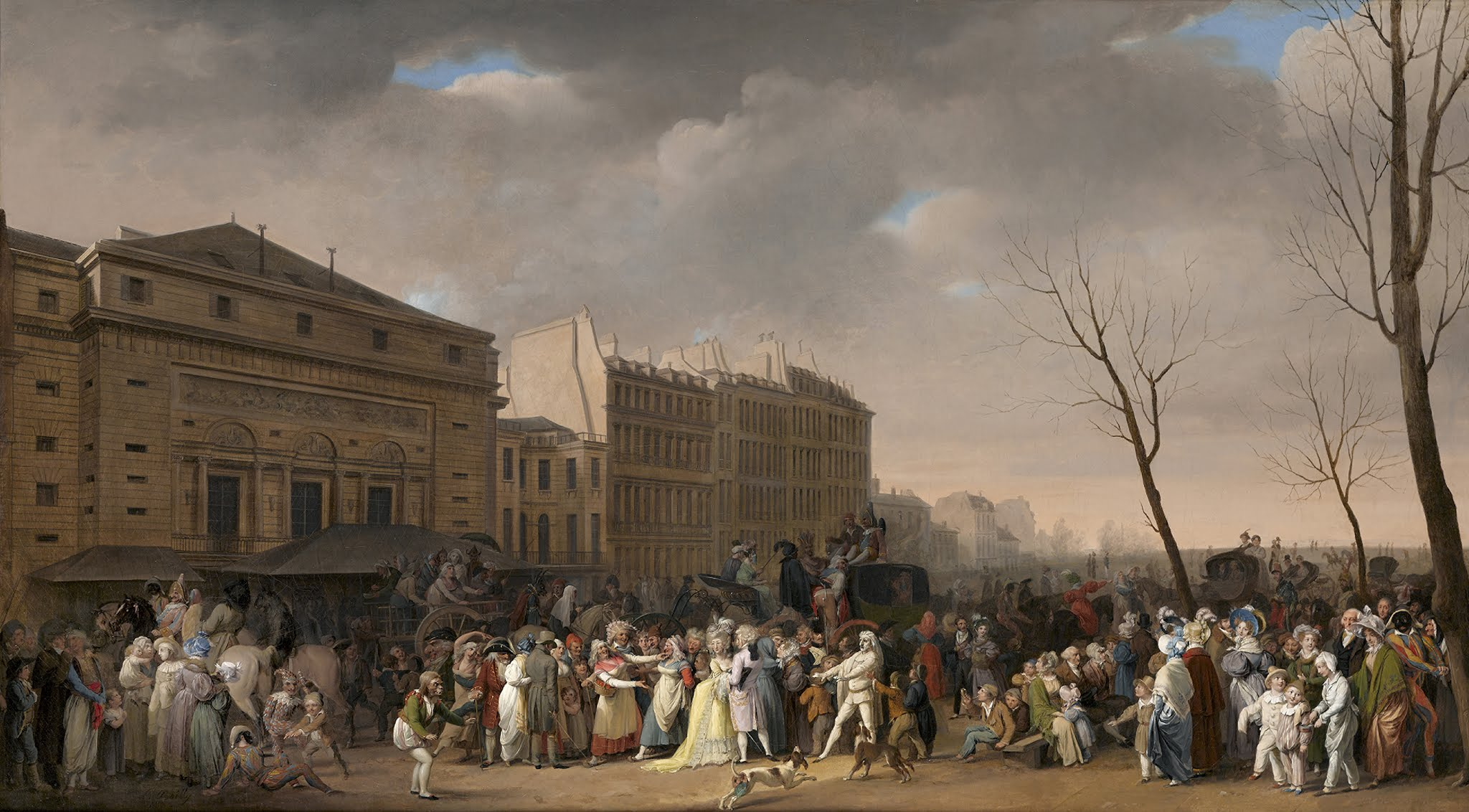
A Carnival Scene by Louis-Léopold Boilly

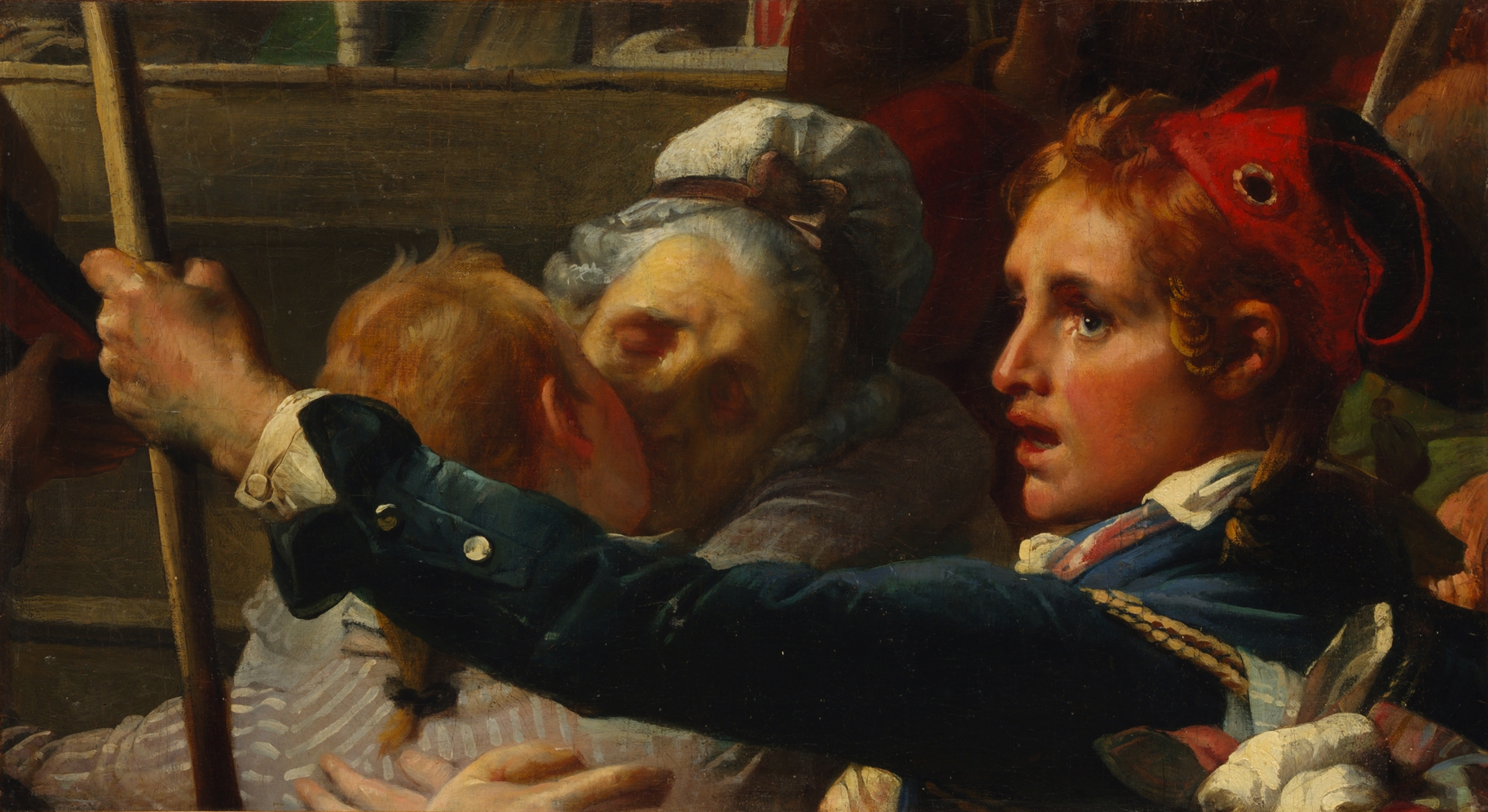
Surviving fragment of The Nation Is in Danger by Auguste-Hyacinthe Debay

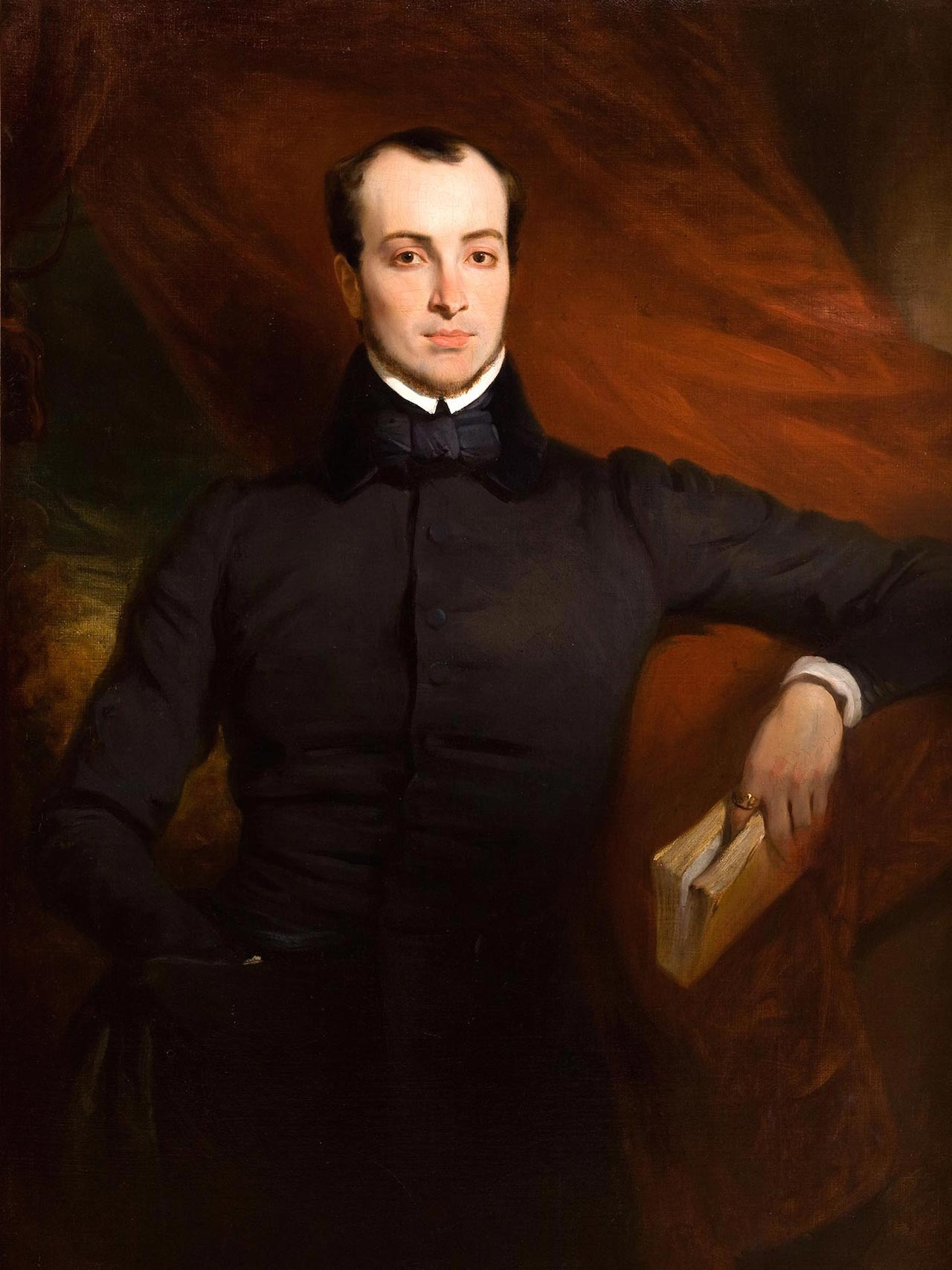
Portrait of Victor Schœlcher by Henri Decaisne

Joan of Arc in Prison by Gillot Saint-Evre

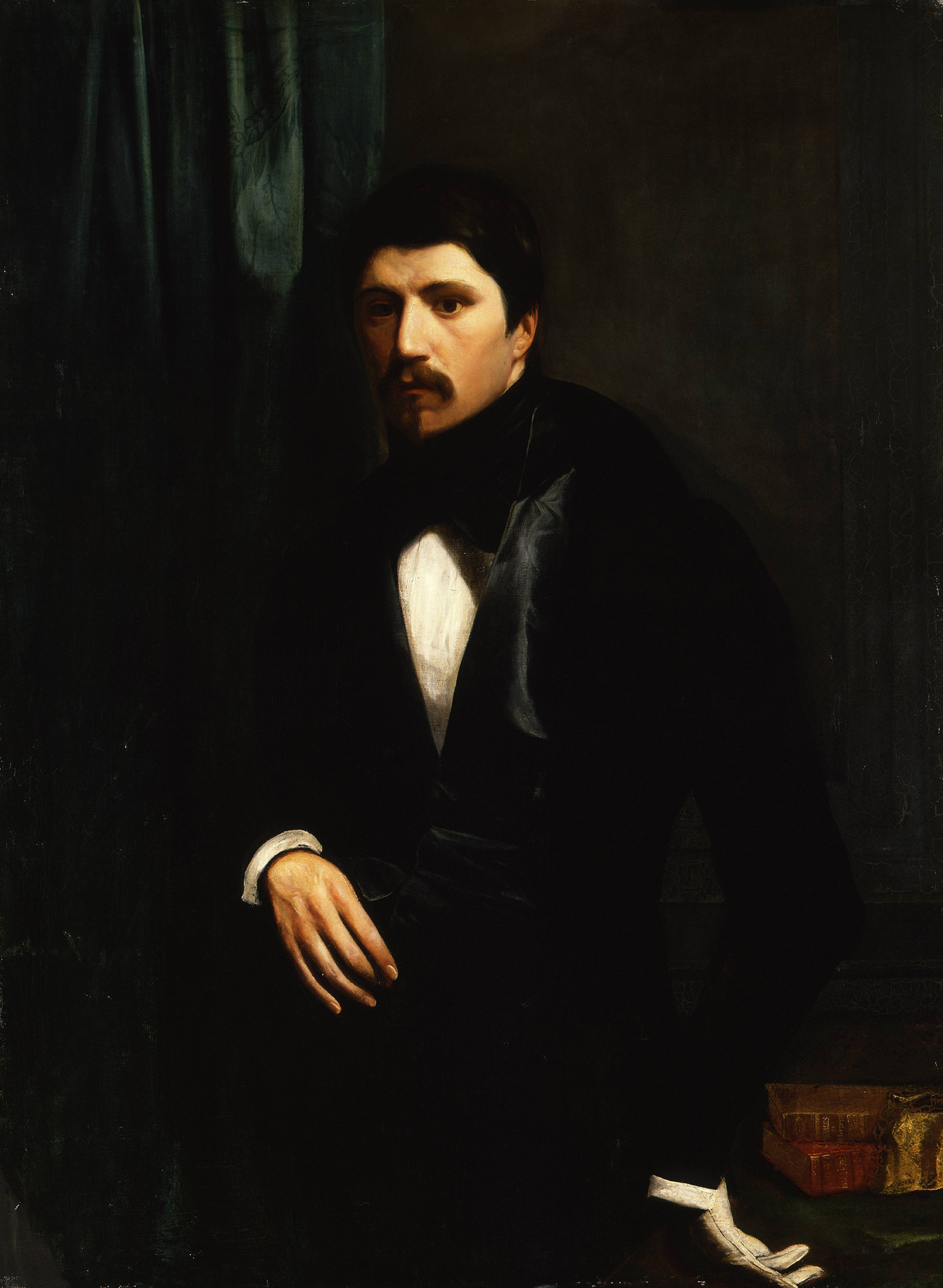
Self-Portrait by Joseph Guichard

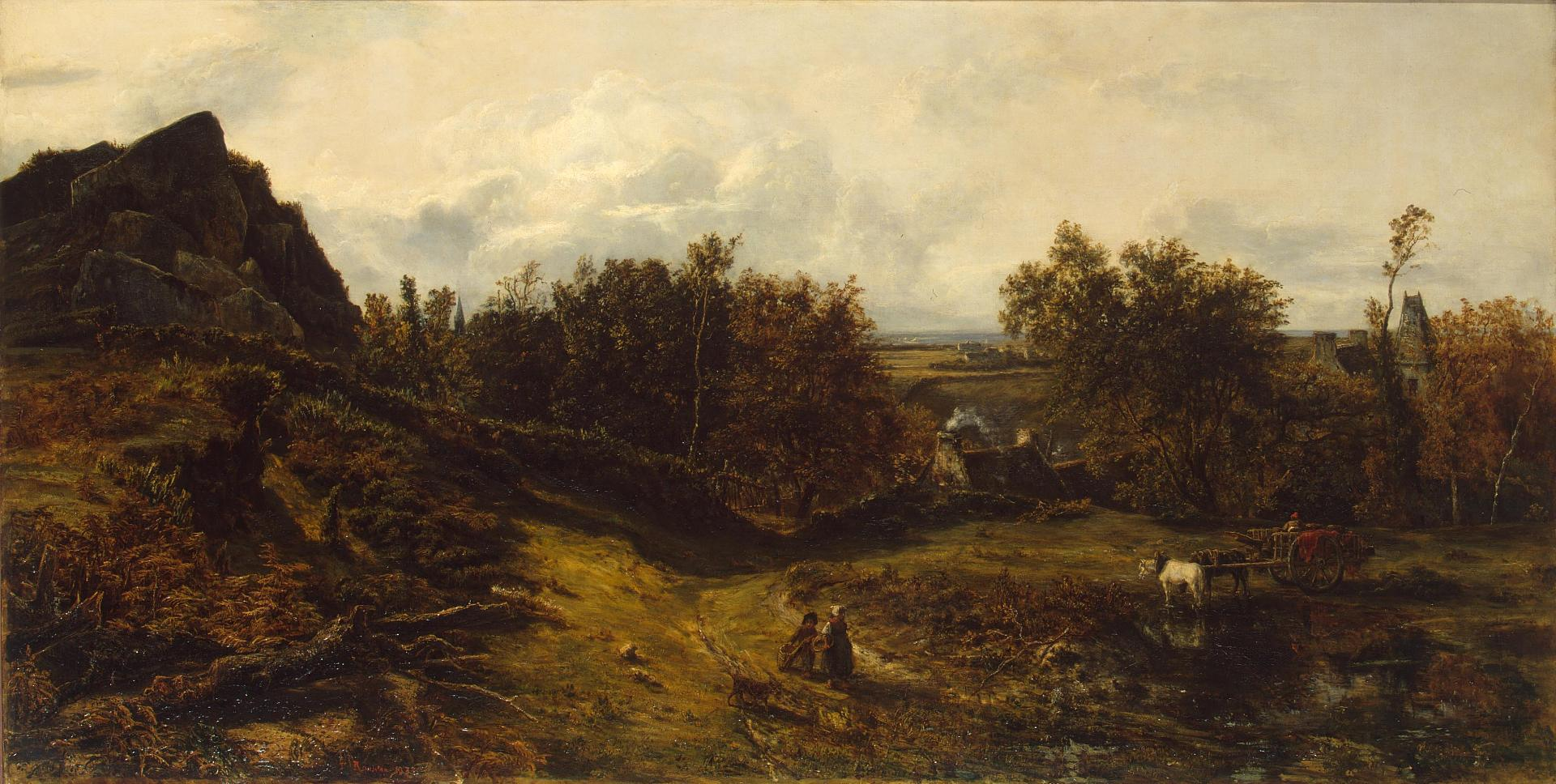
View near Granville by Théodore Rousseau

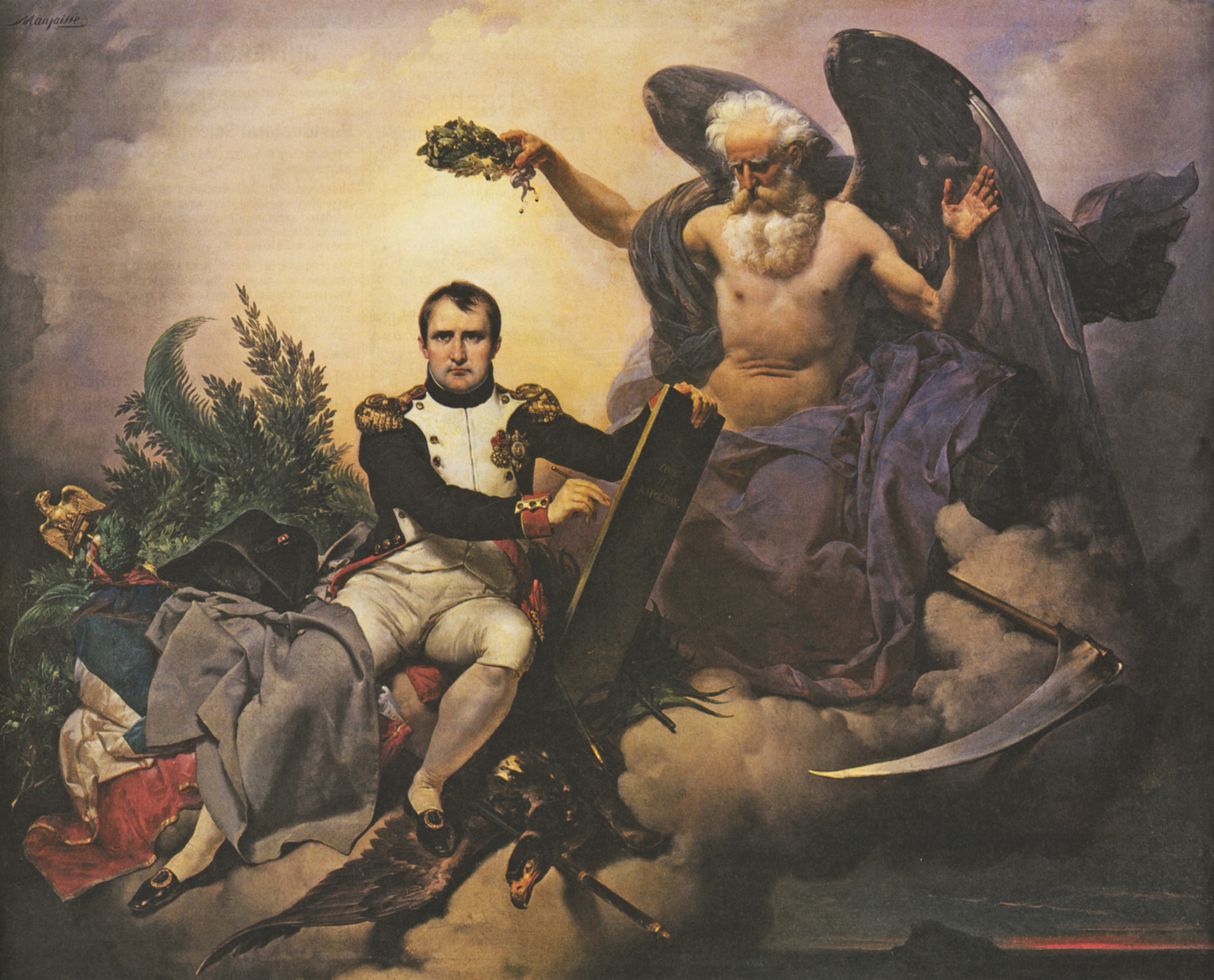
Napoleon, Crowned by Time, Writes the Civil Code by Jean-Baptiste Mauzaisse

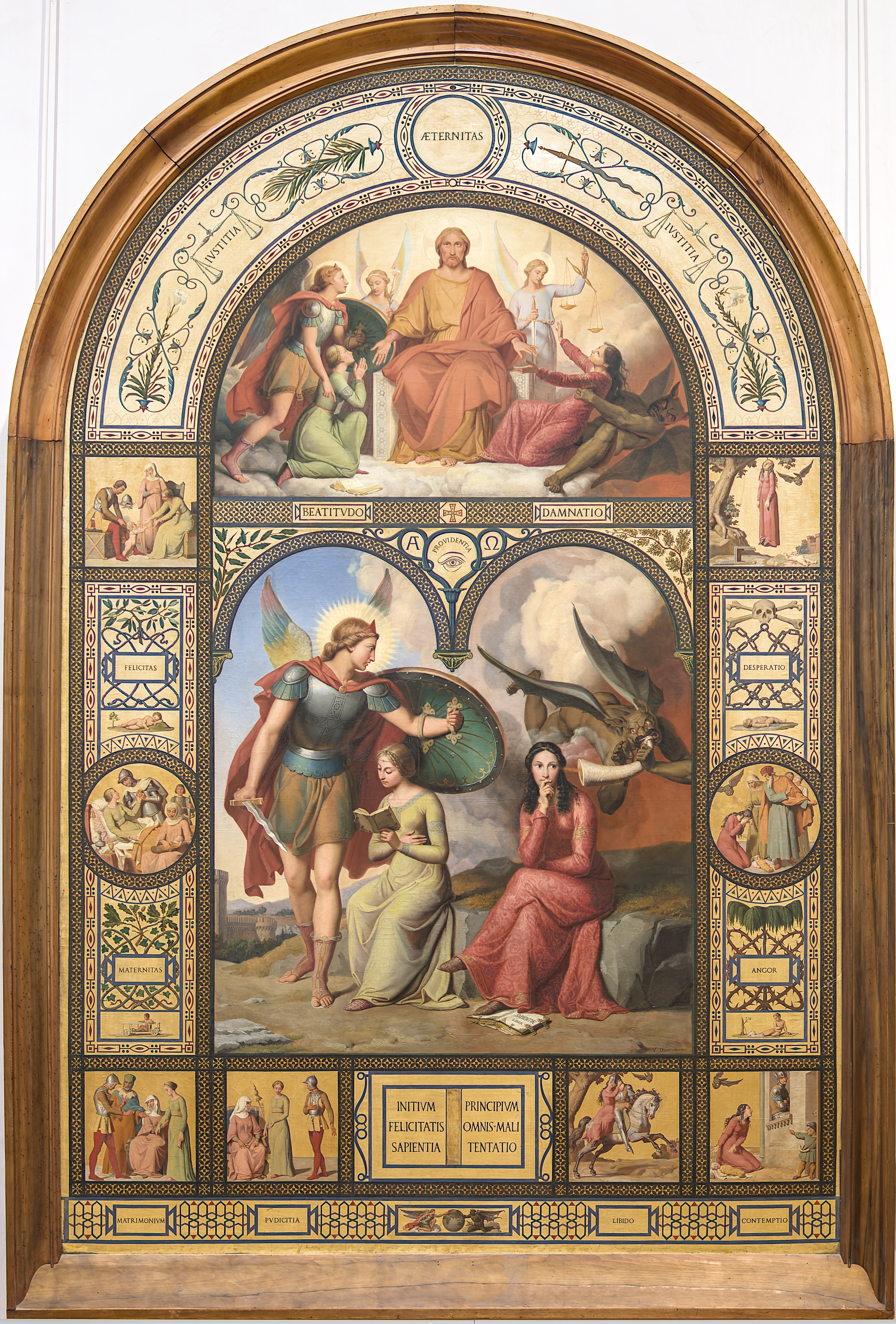
Good and Evil by Victor Orsel

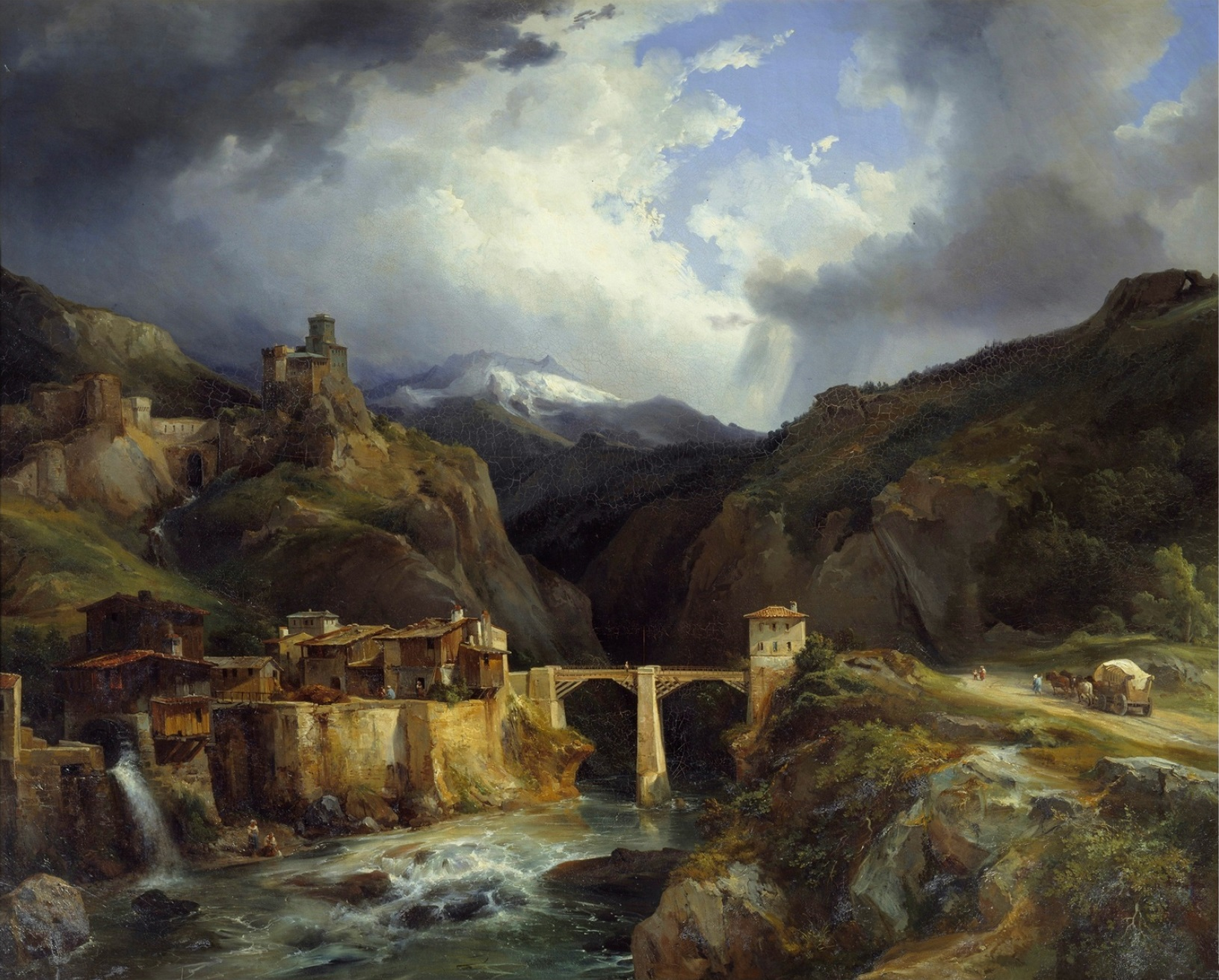
Village and Bridge of Crevola by Jean-Charles-Joseph Rémond

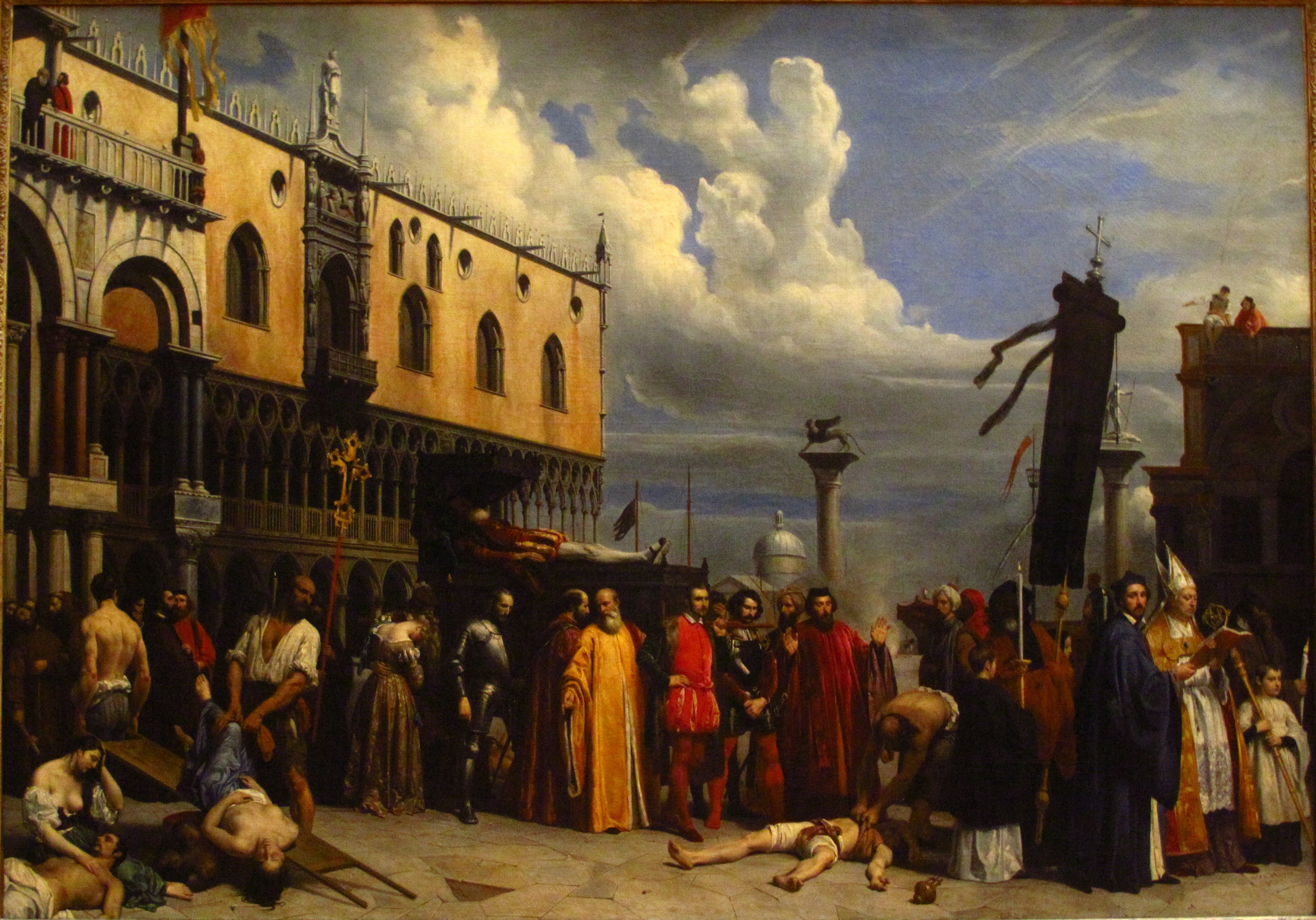
Titian's Dead Corpse in Venice by Alexandre Hesse

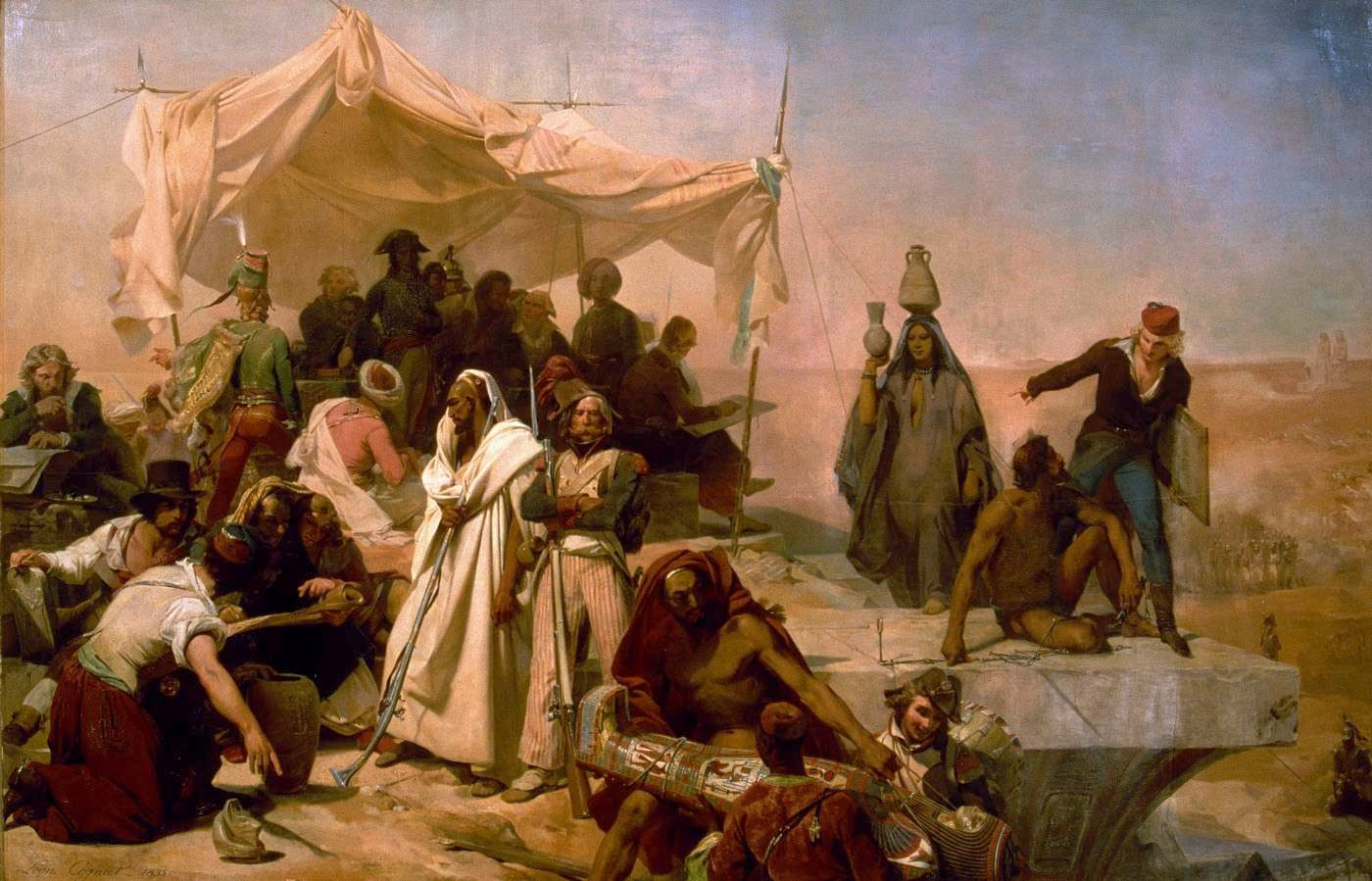
The Expedition to Egypt Under Bonaparte by Leon Cogniet

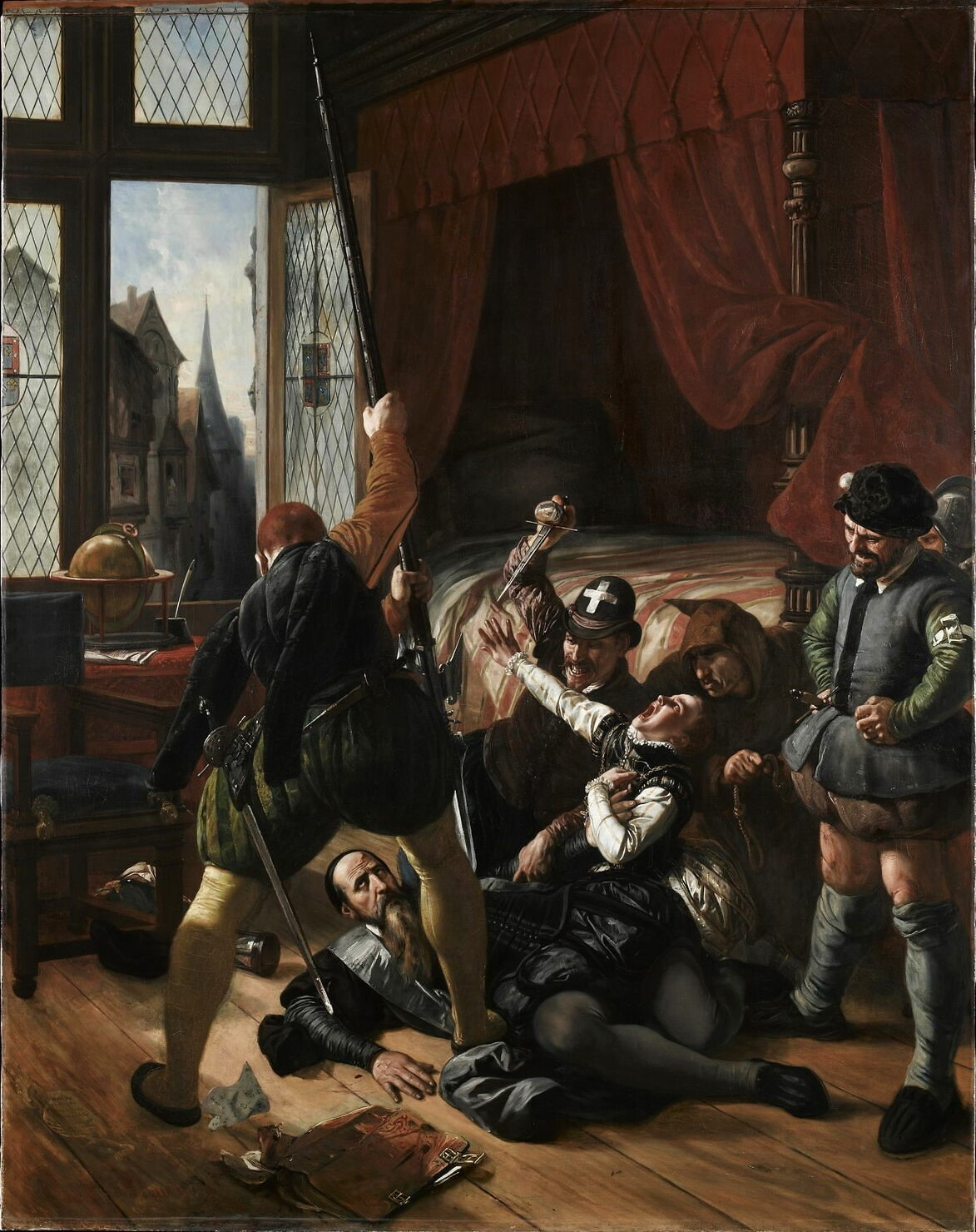
Scene from Saint Bartholomew's Day by Joseph-Nicolas Robert-Fleury

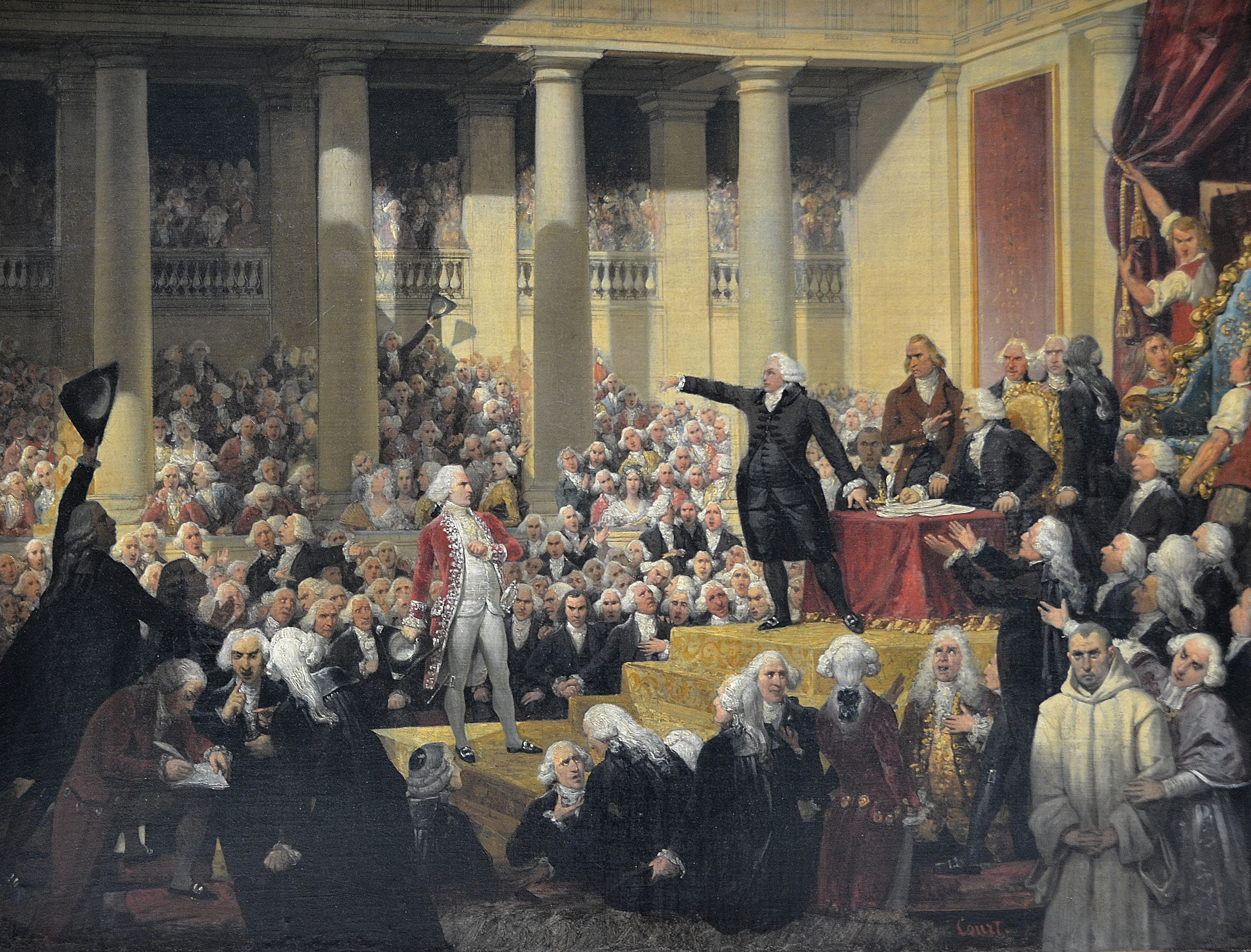
Mirabeau Replying to Dreux-Brézé by Joseph-Désiré Court

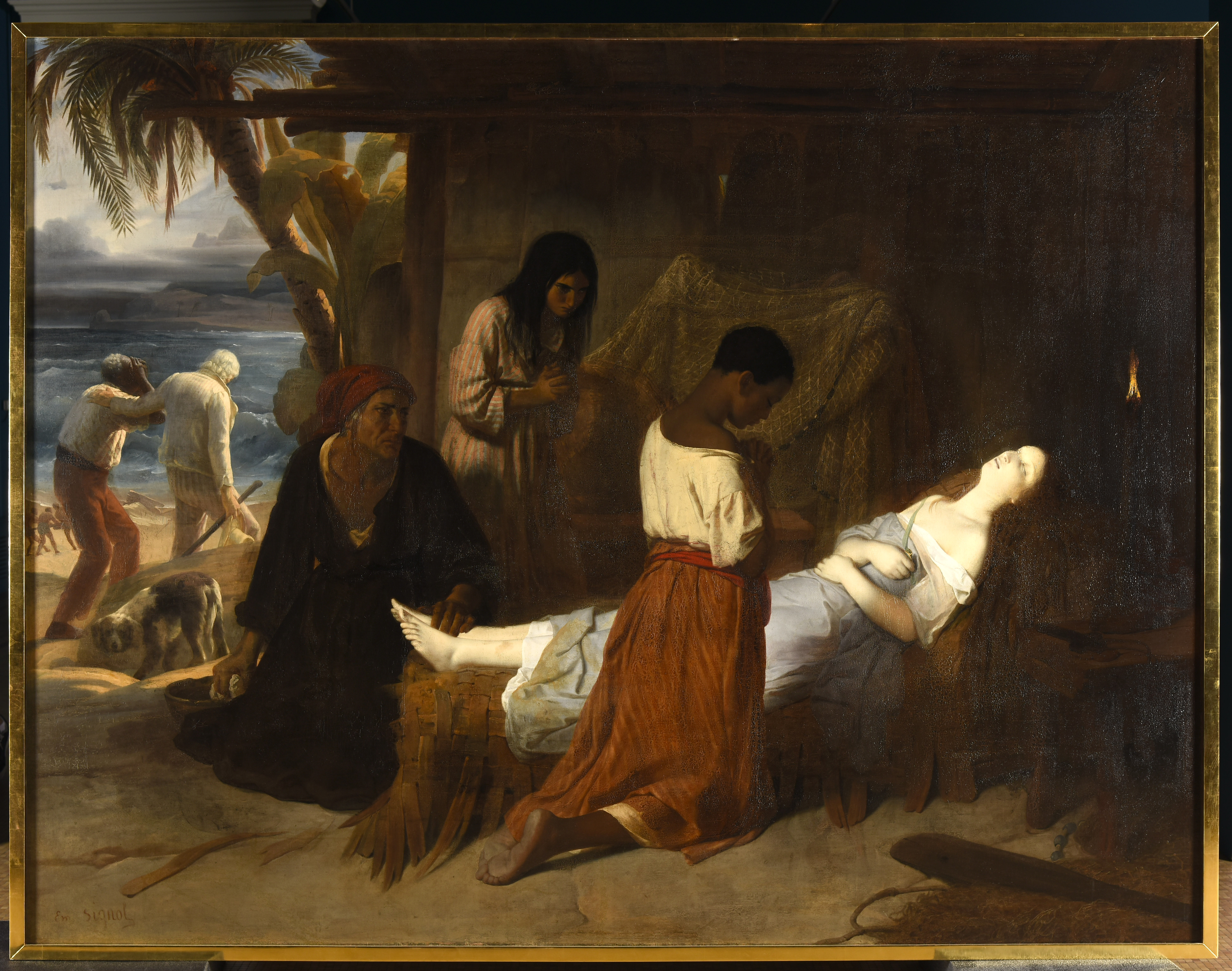
The Death of Virginia by Émile Signol

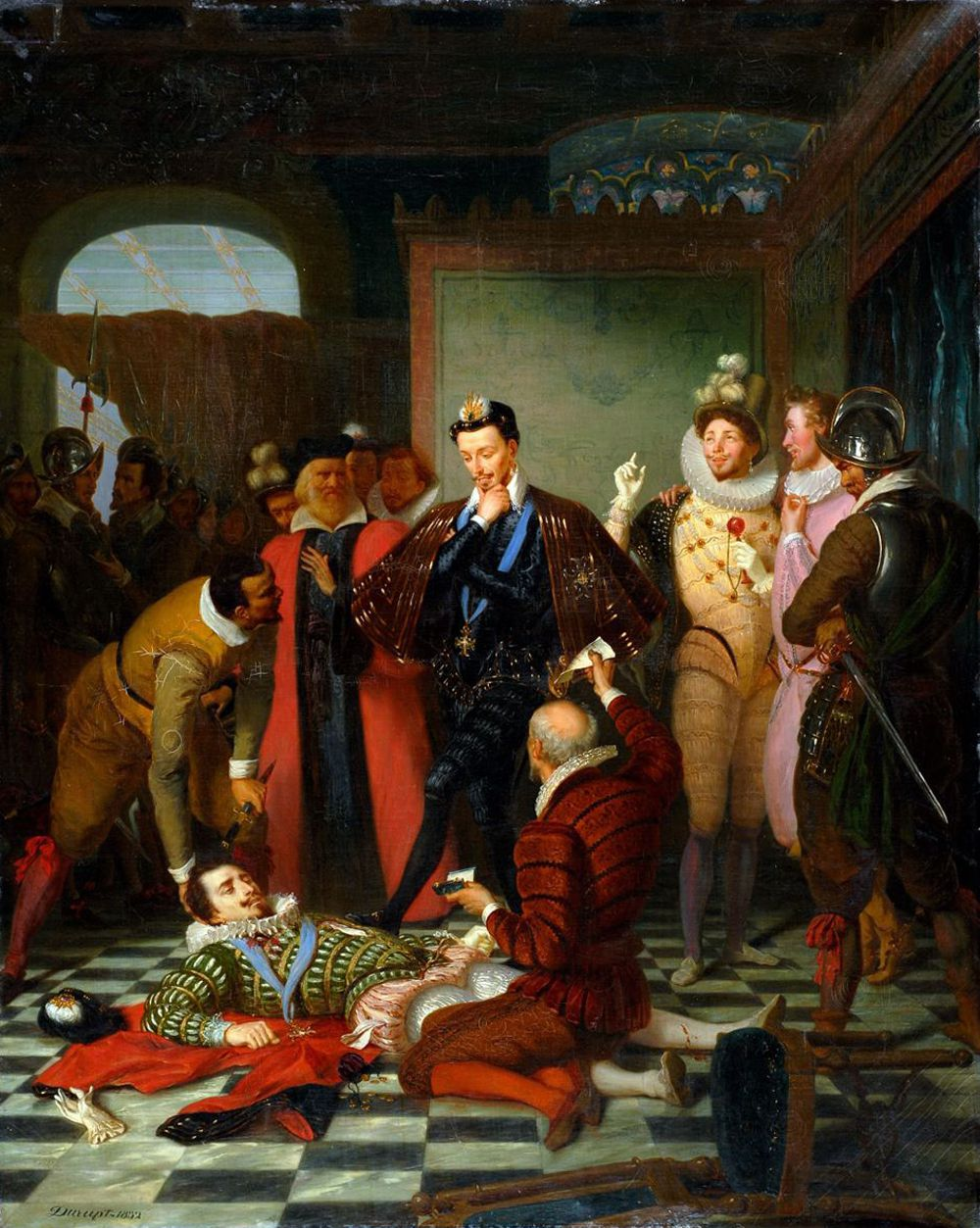
Henry III Watching the Assassination of the Duke of Guise by Charles Durupt

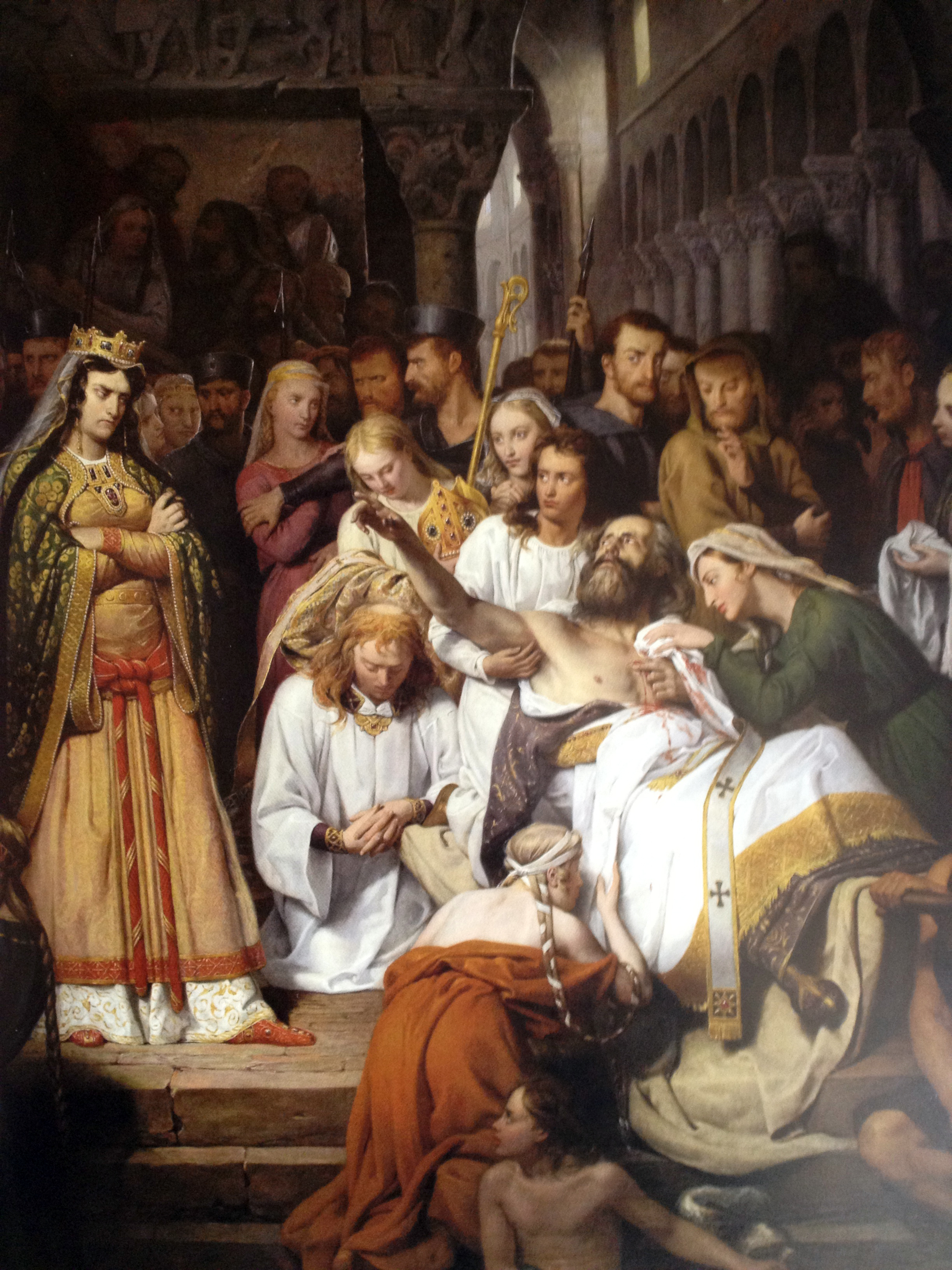
Scene from the Life of Fredegund by Édouard Cibot

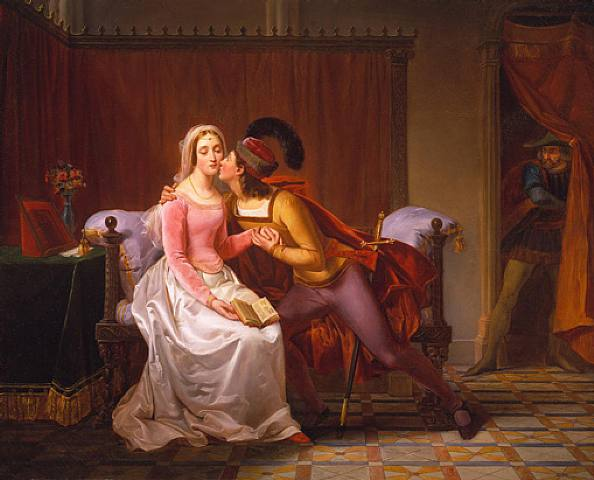
Paolo and Francesca by Luigi Rubio

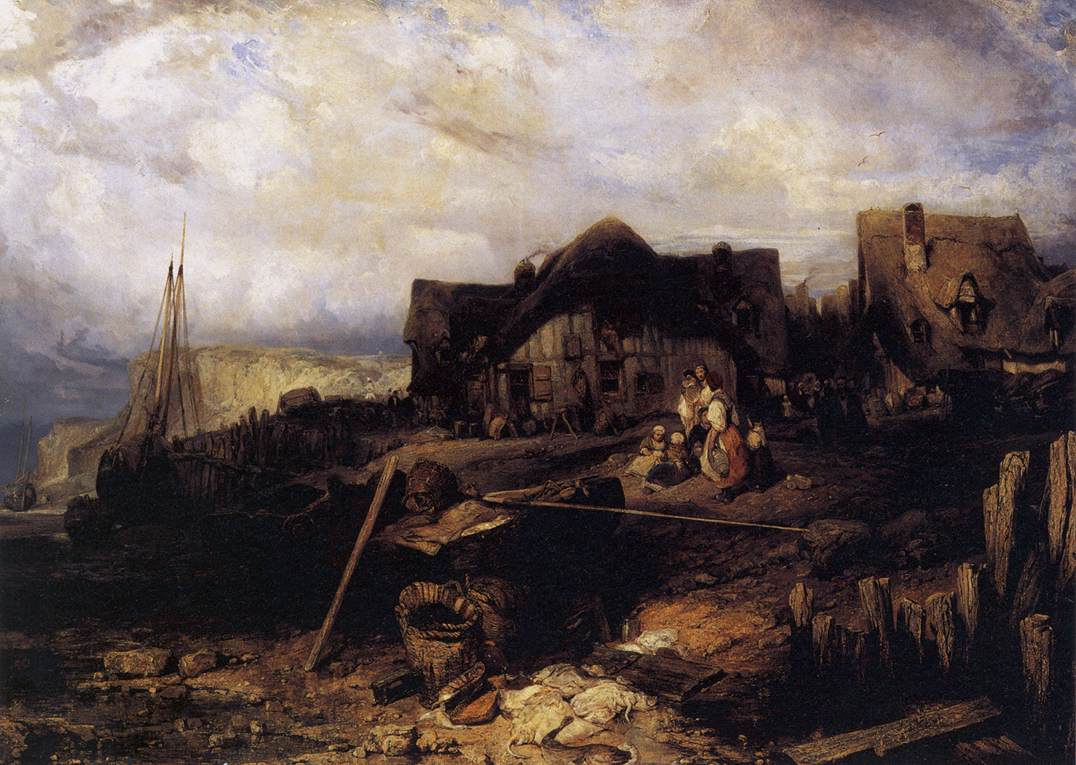
Beach at Low Tide by Eugene Isabey

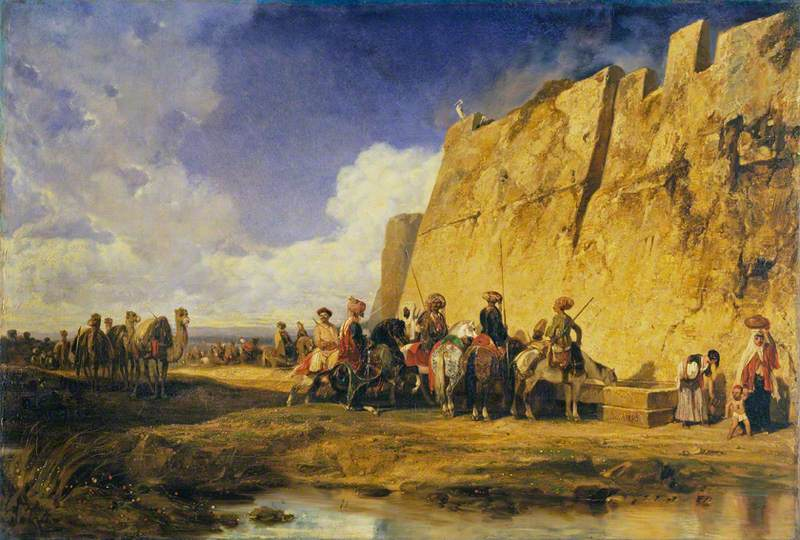
The Watering Place by Alexandre-Gabriel Decamps

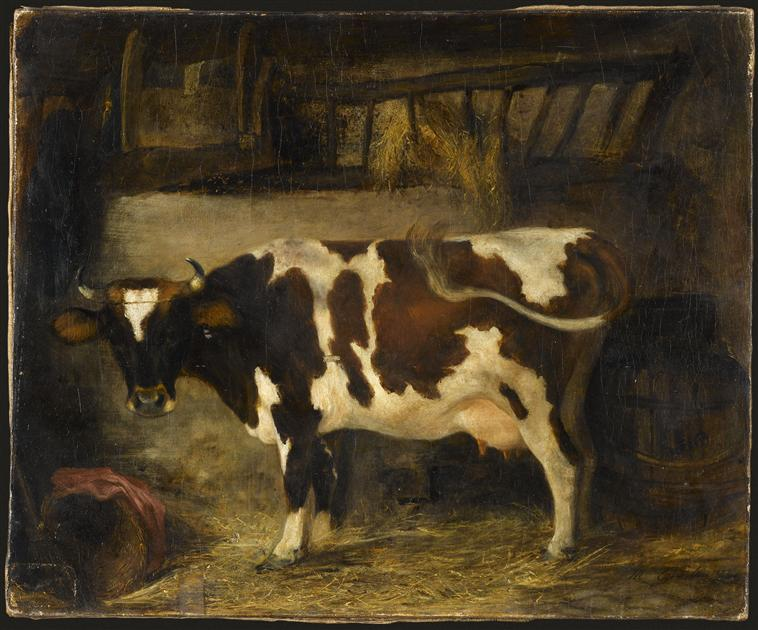
Cow in a Stable by Eugénie Dalton

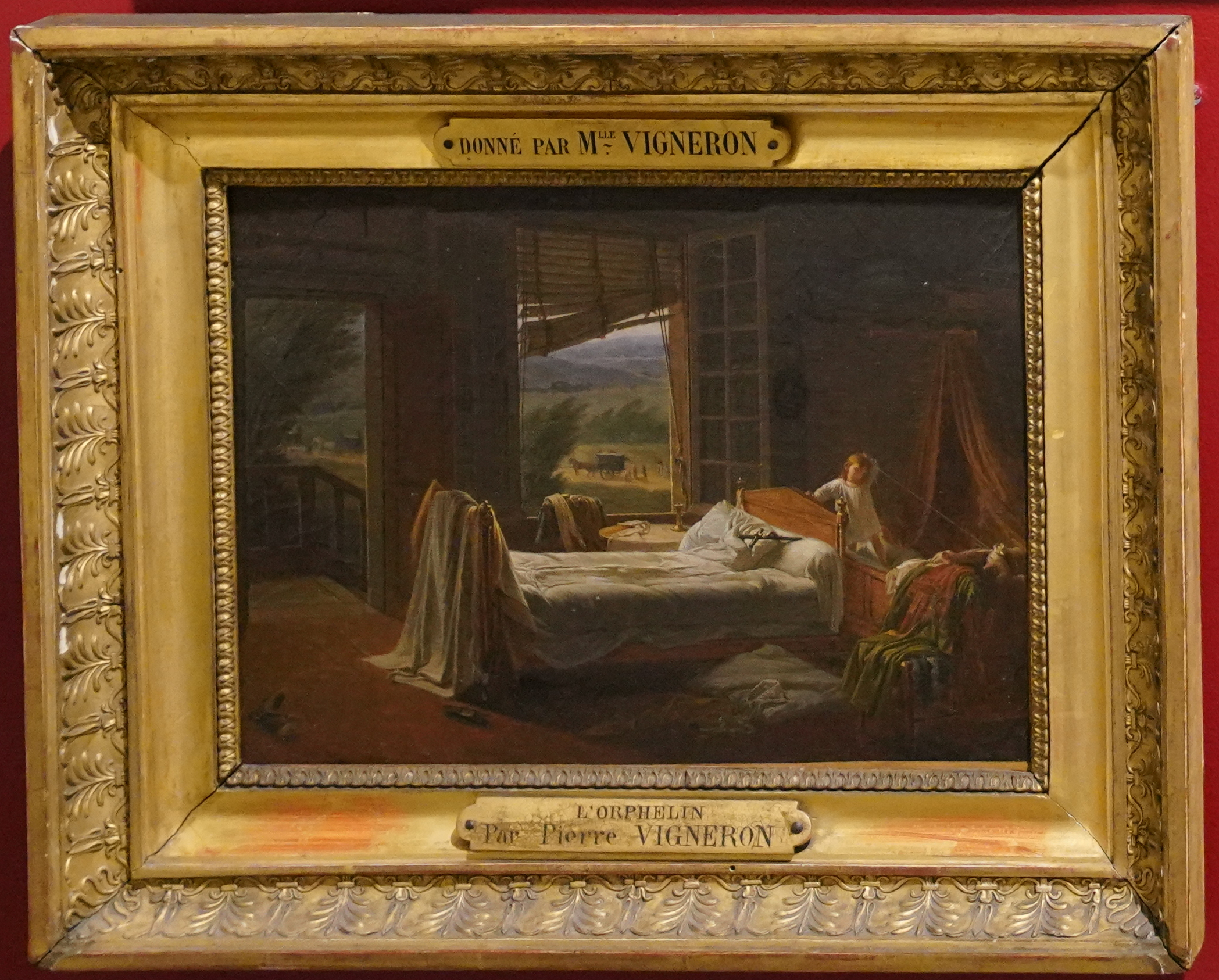
The Orphan by Pierre-Roch Vigneron

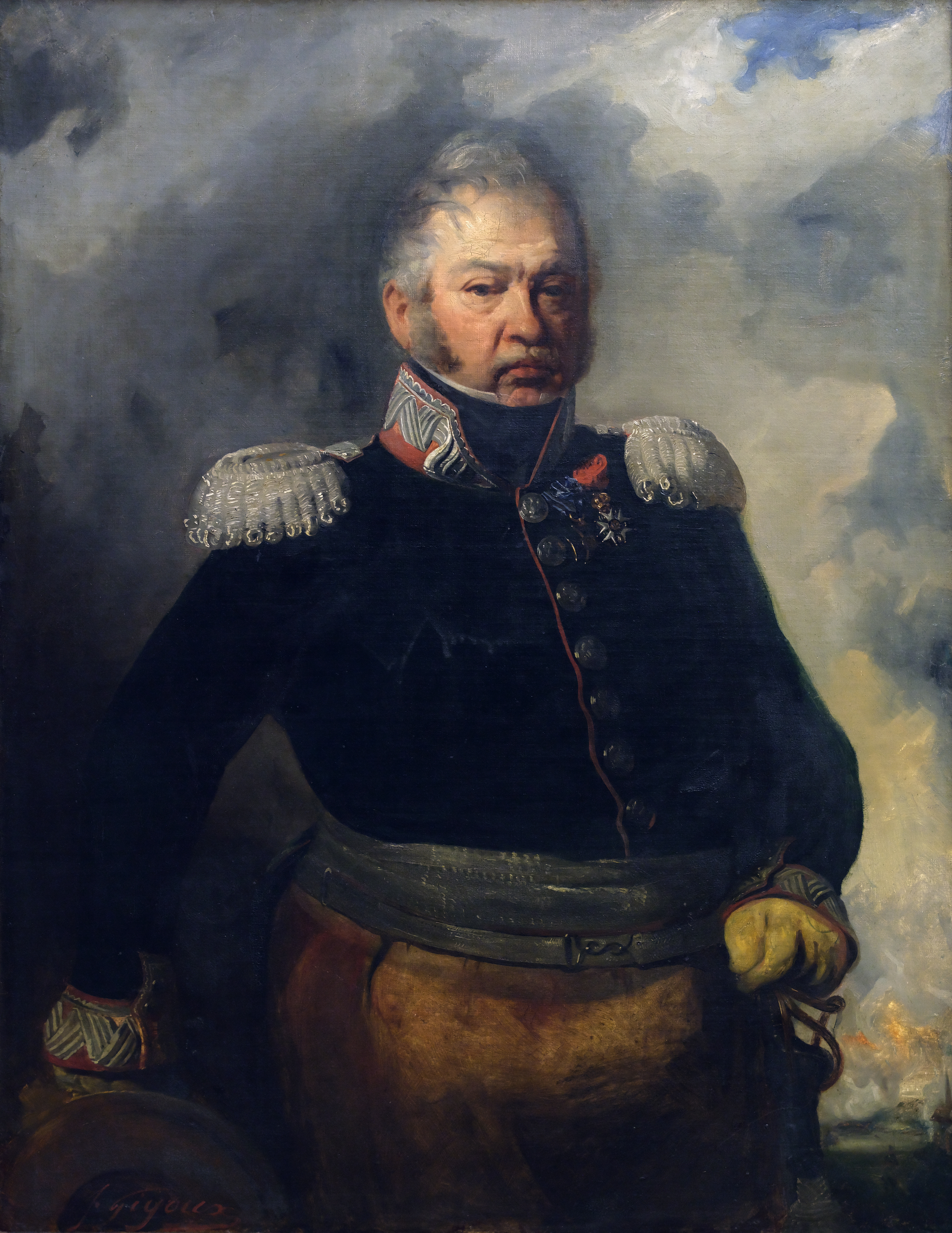
Portrait of Joseph Dwernicki by Jean Gigoux

== Bibliography ==
- Allard, Sébastien & Fabre, Côme. Delacroix. Metropolitan Museum of Art, 2018.
- Boime, Albert. Art in an Age of Counterrevolution, 1815-1848. University of Chicago Press, 2004.
- Harkett, Daniel & Hornstein, Katie (ed.) Horace Vernet and the Thresholds of Nineteenth-Century Visual Culture. Dartmouth College Press, 2017.
- Hazan, Eric. Hazan. Verso Books, 2022.
- Kelly, Simon. Théodore Rousseau and the Rise of the Modern Art Market: An Avant-Garde Landscape Painter in Nineteenth-Century France. Bloomsbury Publishing USA, 2021.
- McWilliam, Neil. Dreams of Happiness: Social Art and the French Left, 1830-1850. Princeton University Press, 2017.
- Smyth, Patricia. Paul Delaroche: Painting and Popular Spectacle. Liverpool University Press, 2022.
- Tinterow, Gary & Conisbee, Philip (ed.) Portraits by Ingres: Image of an Epoch. Metropolitan Museum of Art, 1999.
