= A Carnival Scene =

Painting by Louis-Léopold Boilly

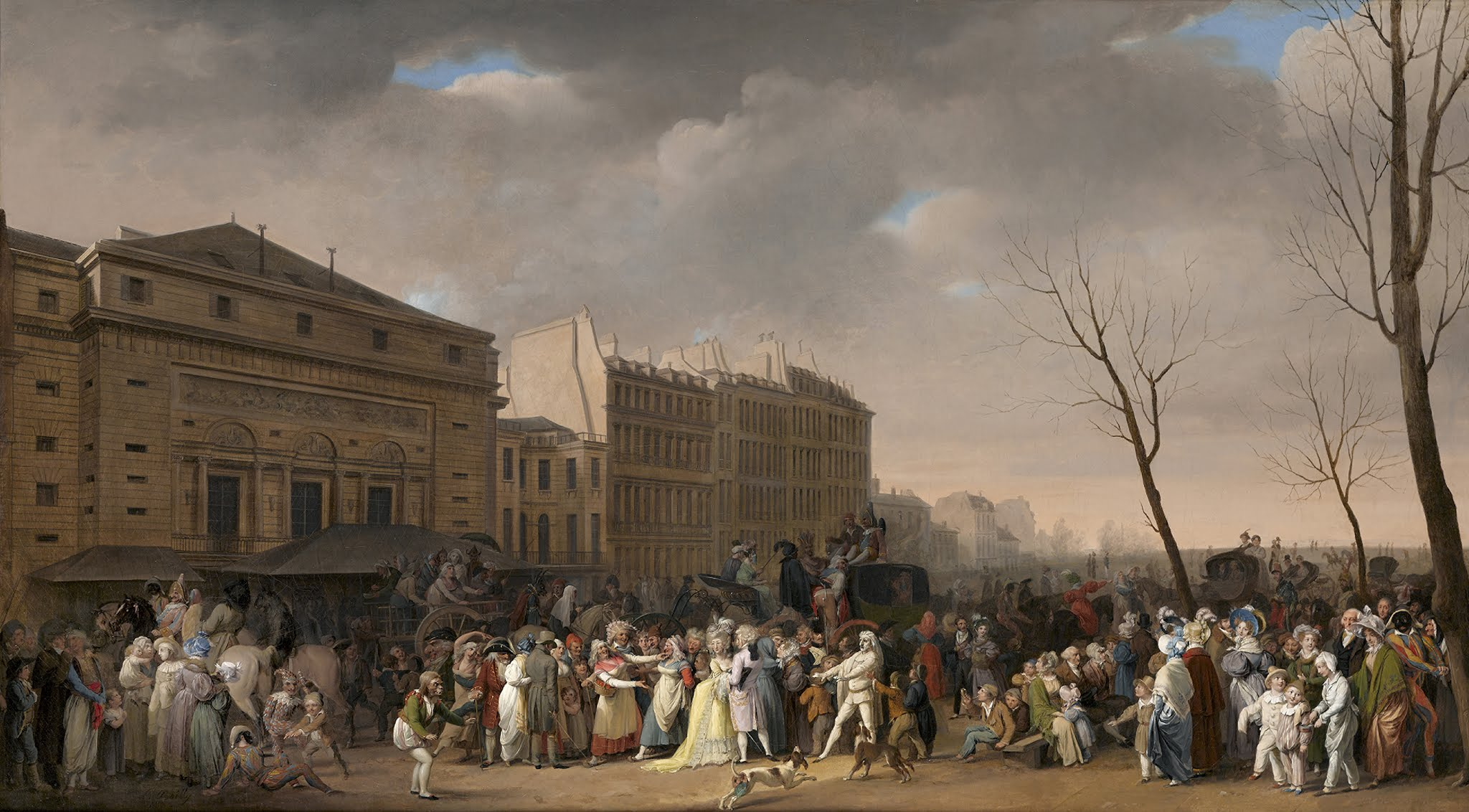
- Artist: Louis-Léopold Boilly
- Year: 1832
- Type: Oil on canvas, genre painting
- Dimensions: 60.3 cm × 106.5 cm (23.7 in × 41.9 in)
- Location: Ramsbury Manor; Wiltshire

A Carnival Scene is an 1832 genre painting by the French artist Louis-Léopold Boilly. It depicts a Parisan street scene in the early years of the July Monarchy. A carnival is taking place in The Marais district, outside the Théâtre de la Porte Saint-Martin. It has been described as Boilly's "most ambitious crowd scene".

It was exhibited at the Salon of 1833 at the Louvre. Today it is in the collection of Ramsbury Manor in Wiltshire. In 2019 it featured in an exhibition at the National Gallery in London.

== Bibliography ==
- Alsdorf, Bridget. Gawkers. Princeton University Press, 2022.
- Whitlum-Cooper, Francesca. Boilly: Scenes of Parisian Life. National Gallery Company, 2019.
