= Raphael at the Vatican =

Painting by Horace Vernet

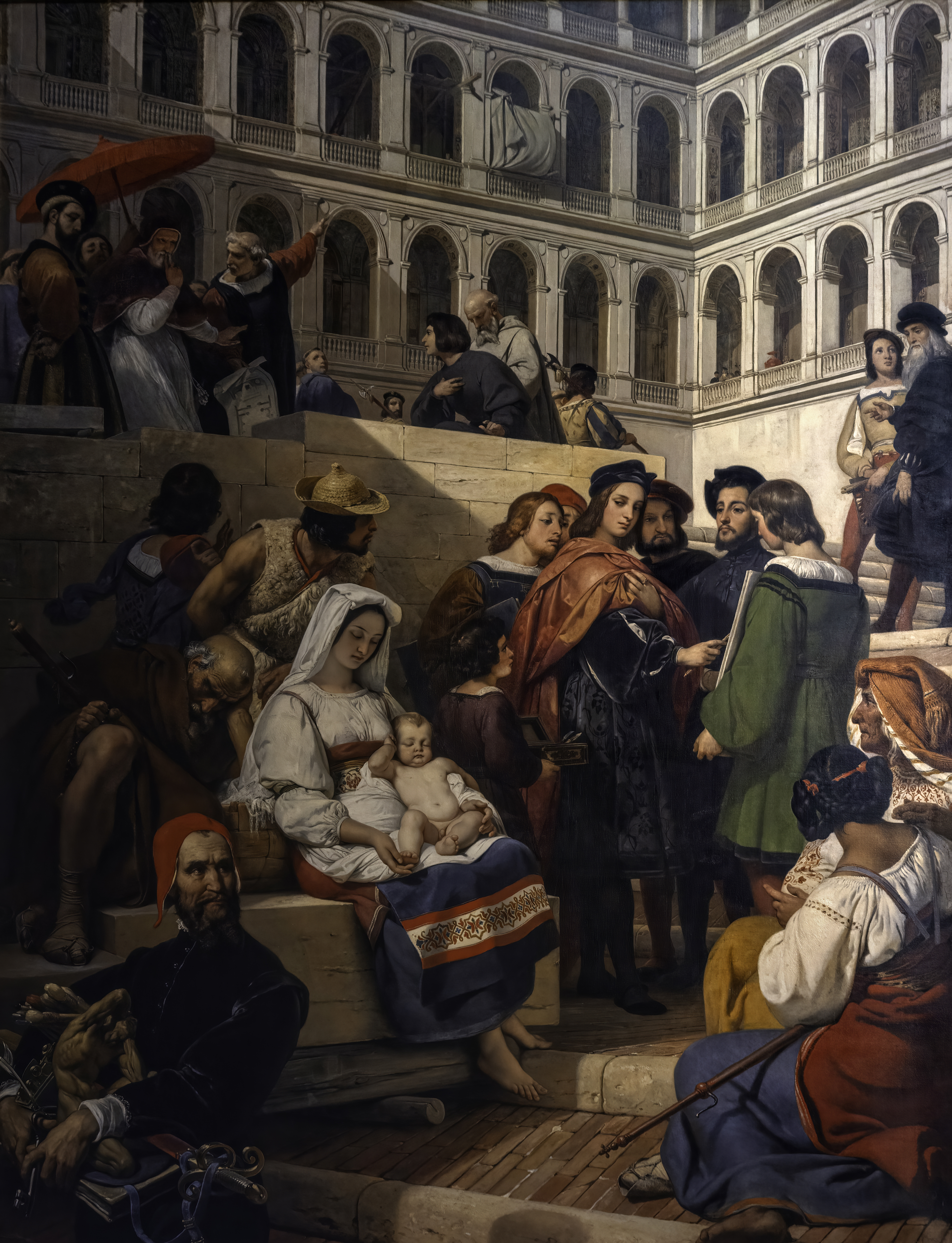
- Artist: Horace Vernet
- Year: 1832
- Type: Oil on canvas, history painting
- Dimensions: 392 cm × 300 cm (154 in × 120 in)
- Location: Louvre, Paris

Raphael at the Vatican (French: Raphaël au Vatican) is an 1832 history painting by the French artist Horace Vernet. It depicts an encounter in Rome between the Renaissance artists Raphael and Michelangelo. It is in the collection of the Louvre, in Paris.

== History and description ==
It was inspired by a passage in the biography of Raphael written by Quatremère de Quincy. Raphael is shown at a makeshift easel drawing a peasant woman with her child and surrounded by a crowd of attentive students while Michelangelo is shown in the bottom left corner. Above them are Pope Julius II and Leonardo da Vinci.

Vernet produced the work while he was director of the French Academy in Rome. It was exhibited at the Salon of 1833.

== Bibliography ==
- Harkett, Daniel & Hornstein, Katie (ed.) Horace Vernet and the Thresholds of Nineteenth-Century Visual Culture. Dartmouth College Press, 2017.
- Waller, Susan. The Invention of the Model: Artists and Models in Paris, 1830-1870. Routledge, 2017.
