= Eugénie Dalton =

French artist (1802–1859)

- Born: Geneviève-Charlotte Simon; 7 September 1802; Paris, France
- Died: 9 February 1859 (aged 56); Algiers, French Algeria
- Notable work: Cow in a Stable

Eugénie Dalton or D'Alton (née Geneviève-Charlotte Simon), (7 September 1802 or 1803 – 9 February 1859) was a dancer as well as pupil and mistress of Eugène Delacroix.

Her older brother, François Simon (1800–1877), was a star dancer at the Paris Opera from 1822 to 1842 and commissioned several portraits from Delacroix.

== Biography ==
After working as a dancer, in February 1824 she married an Anglo-Irish officer, Philip Tuite Dalton, in Paris. Together they had a daughter, Charlotte Dalton, who was born in Dublin in 1819. Their marriage was a tempestuous one, with them living most often separated between Paris and London. During this time her lovers included Horace Vernet, Richard Parkes Bonington, and Eugène Delacroix.

From 1823, she became the pupil and then the mistress of Delacroix, who wrote fiery letters to her. She responded to these with letters and concluded them with the phrase la petite amie qui t'aime (the girlfriend who loves you). In 1829, Delacroix painted Saint Mary Magdalene at the Foot of the Cross for Dalton. In 1831, Delacroix painted her portrait and, in 1834, she posed as one of the three subjects of the Women of Algiers.

Dalton was mainly known for painting landscapes, still lifes (including Still Life with Game in the Grand Trianon) as well as animal scenes.

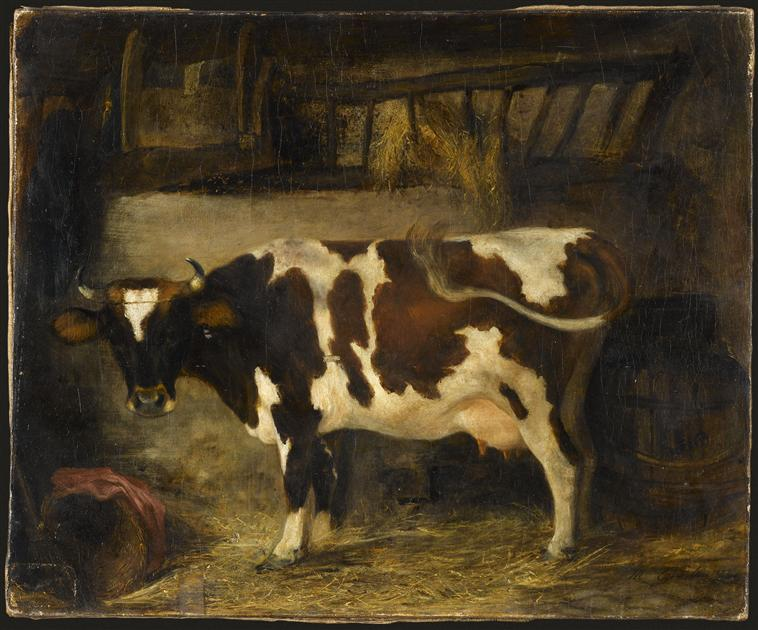
Cow in a Stable, 1832, Louvre, Paris

She exhibited at all the salons, from the Salon of 1827 to 1840, where her landscapes "dans la manière anglaise" were remarked upon by the critic Étienne-Jean Delécluze. The Louvre bought Cow in a Stable (1832) from her at the Salon of 1833, where she was awarded a second-class medal. Dalton is one of only twenty-one female artists with works in the collections of the Louvre.

In 1839, she settled in Algiers and made frequent round trips between Paris and London where her husband had settled in 1843. After the death of her husband, she is believed to have lived in Algiers with her collection of paintings, including those by Delacroix. She died in Algiers on 9 February 9, 1859. Her art collection was put up for sale in 1864.

Her largely forgotten biography was rediscovered in the 20th century, by Michèle Hannoosh in her publication of Journal de Delacroix in 2009.
