= Auguste-Hyacinthe Debay =

French painter and sculptor

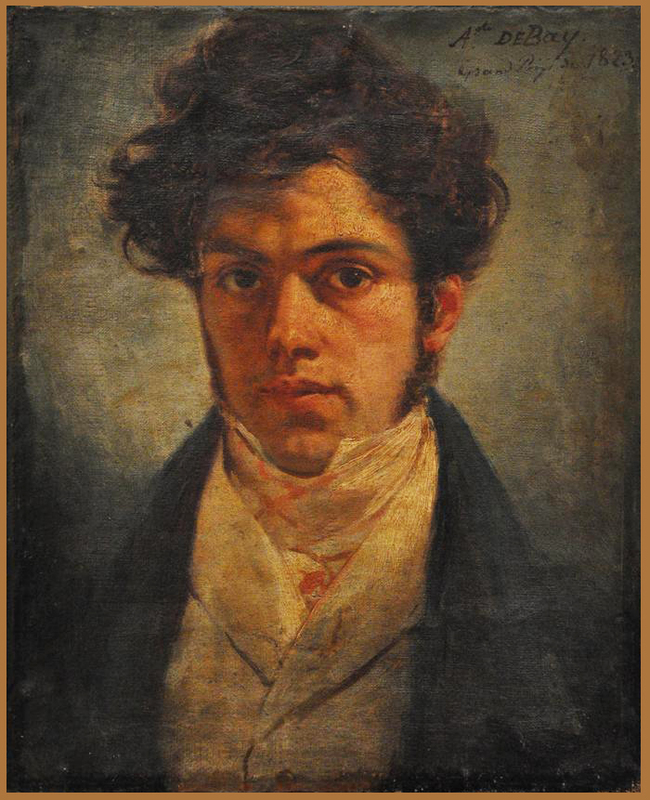
Auguste-Hyacinthe Debay

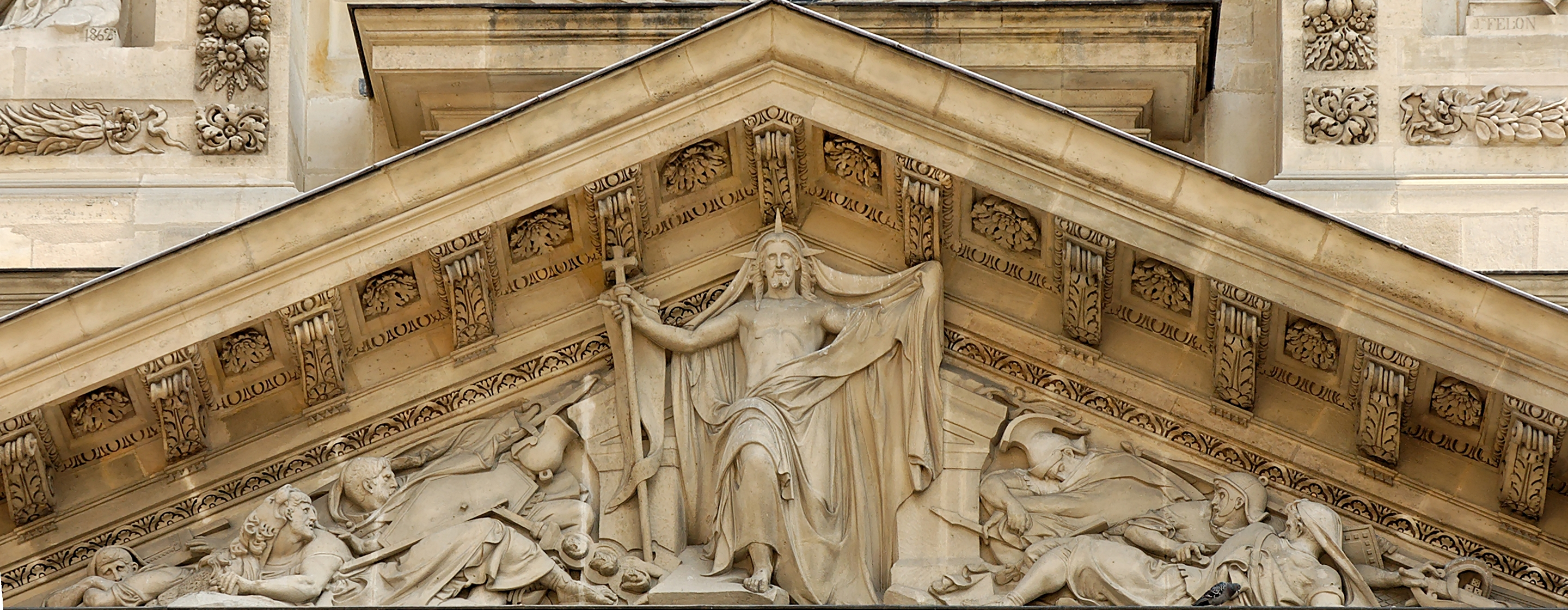
Victorious Christ, pediment of the Saint-Étienne-du-Mont church in Paris

Auguste-Hyacinthe Debay (French pronunciation: [oɡyst jasɛ̃t dəbɛ]; 2 April 1804 – 24 March 1865) was a French painter and sculptor.

== Life and career ==
Auguste-Hyacinthe Debay was born in Nantes, France on 2 April 1804. His father, Joseph Jan Baptiste de Bay, 1829, was an eminent sculptor who worked in Paris and locally in Nantes. Debay learned sculpting from his father at an early age, but started his career as a historical painter. On August 28, 1817, he was admitted to the Ecole des Beaux-Arts and exhibited his first portraits to The Salon at the age of thirteen. After studying under Gros, he obtained the Prix de Rome in 1823 with his painting Aegisthus Discovering the Body of Clytemnestra. Soon after this he gave up painting for sculpture, which he studied under his father, and in which he was successful. Some of his historical paintings are displayed at the Versailles. He died in Paris.

== Gallery ==
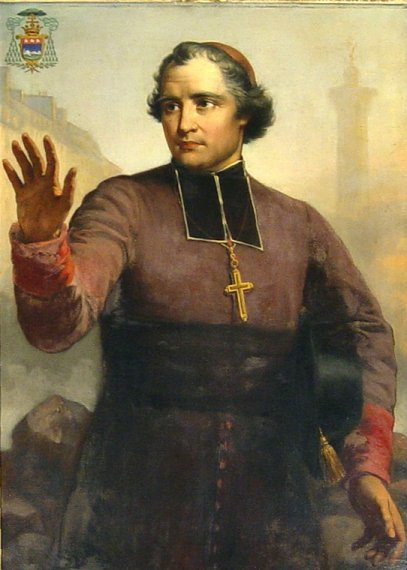
Denis Auguste Affre (1793–1848), archbishop of Paris

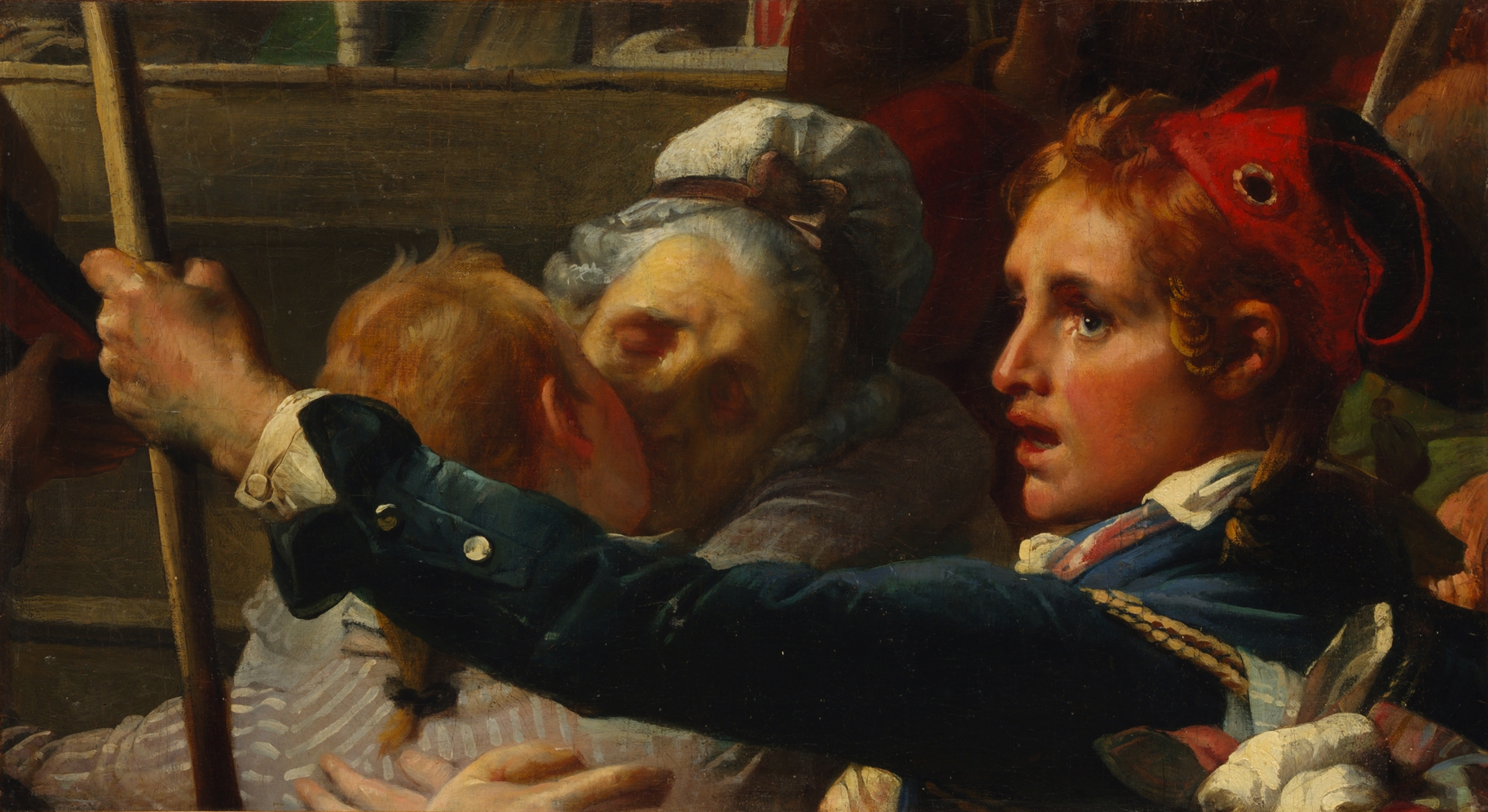
The Nation Is in Danger, or the Enrollment of Volunteers at the Place du Palais-Royal in July 1792 (fragment)

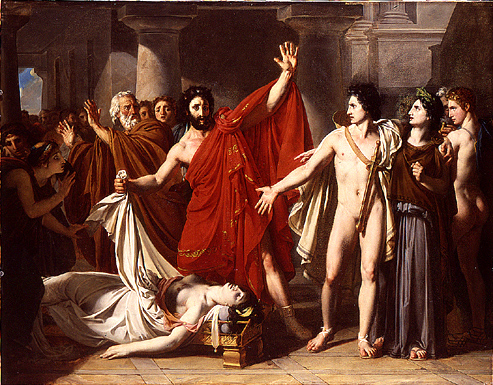
Aegisthus Discovering the Body of Clytemnestra (Prix de Rome 1823)

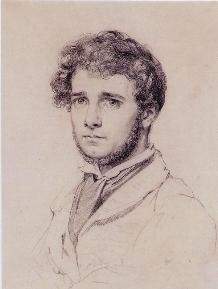
Augustin-Alexandre Dumont, 1829

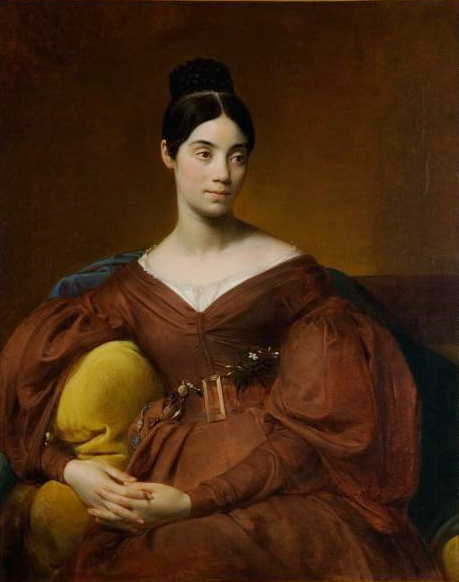
Madame Félix Crucy, Musée des Beaux-Arts de Nantes

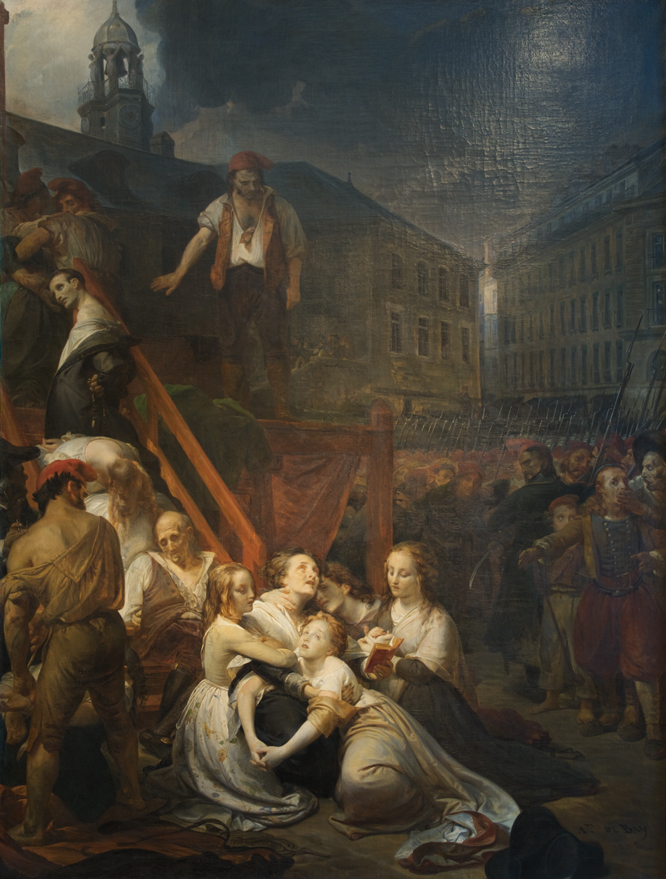
Executions of the Sisters, 1793
