= Hersent =

Hersent is a French surname. Notable people with the surname include:

- Louis Hersent (1777–1860), French painter
- Louise Marie-Jeanne Hersent-Mauduit (1784–1862), French painter, wife of Louis
- Léocadie Hersent-Penquer (1817–1889), French poet
- Philippe Hersent (1912–1982), French actor
