= Louise Adélaïde Desnos =

French painter (1807–1878)

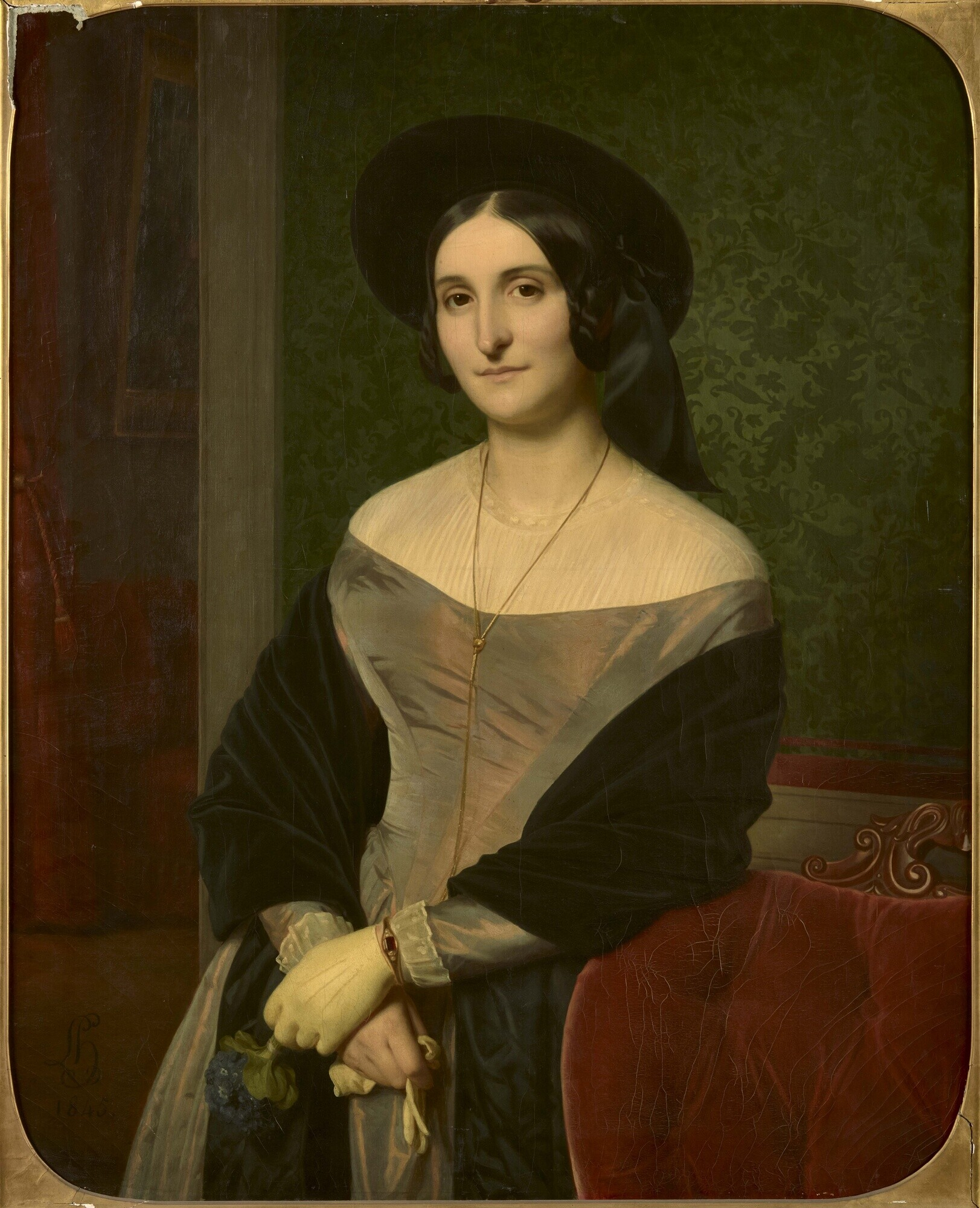
- Portrait of Desnos by Louis Hersent (1845)
- Born: Louise Robin; 25 August 1807; Paris, First French Empire
- Died: 9 September 1878 (aged 71); Abbeville, French Third Republic
- Education: Louise Hersent-Mauduit

Louise Adélaïde Desnos, also known as Louise Desnos (née Robin; 25 August 1807 – 9 September 1878), was a French portrait and history painter.

== Gallery ==
=== Works ===
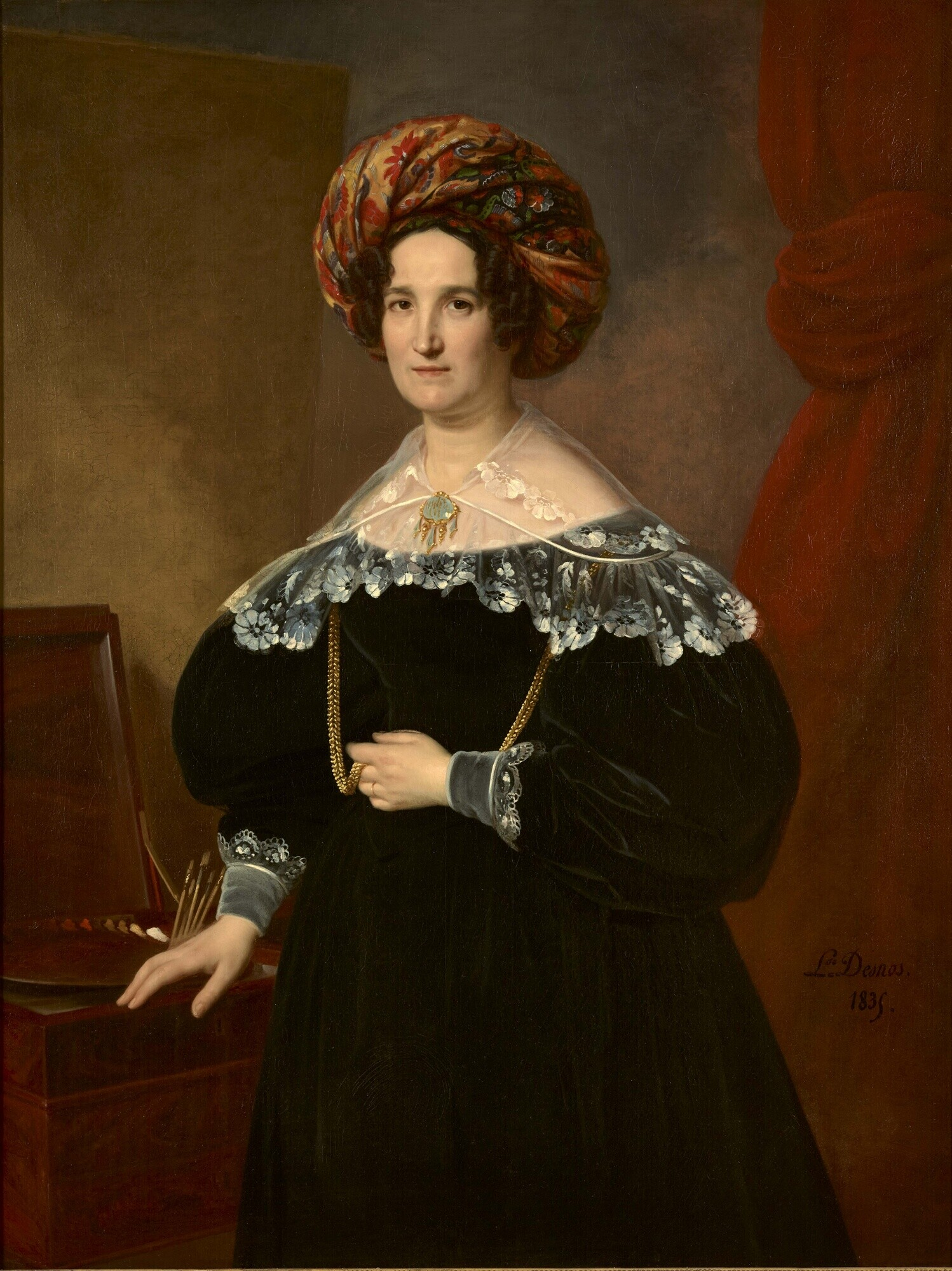
Louise Marie-Jeanne Hersent-Mauduit (1835)

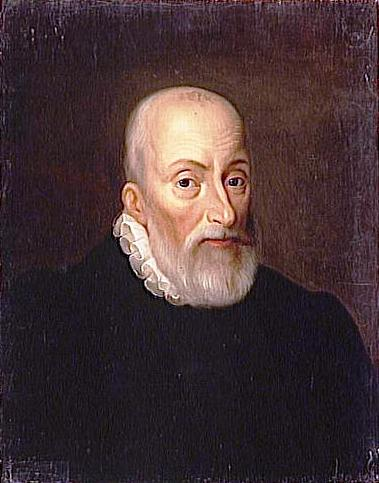
Pomponne de Bellièvre (1835)

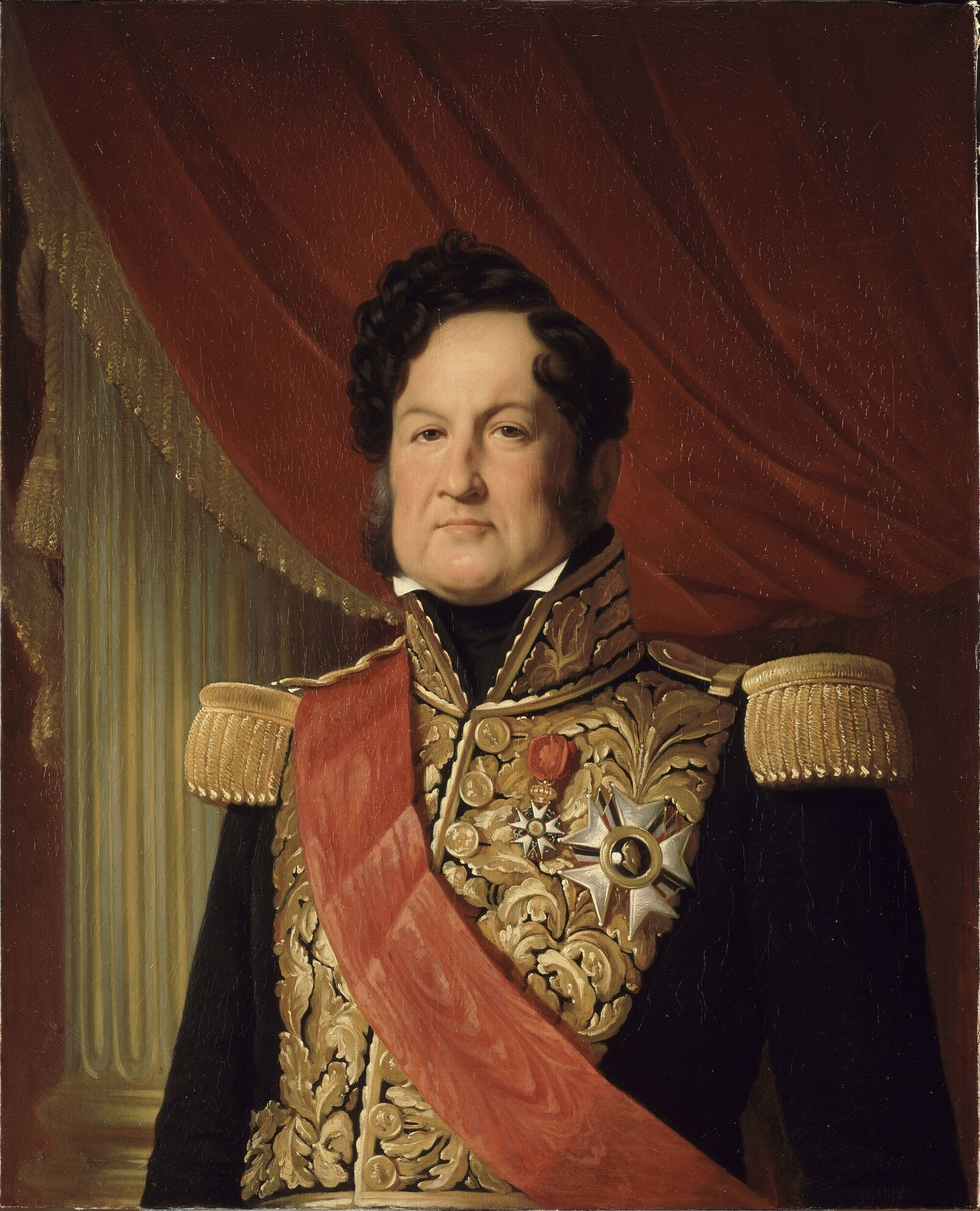
Louis Philippe I of France (1838)

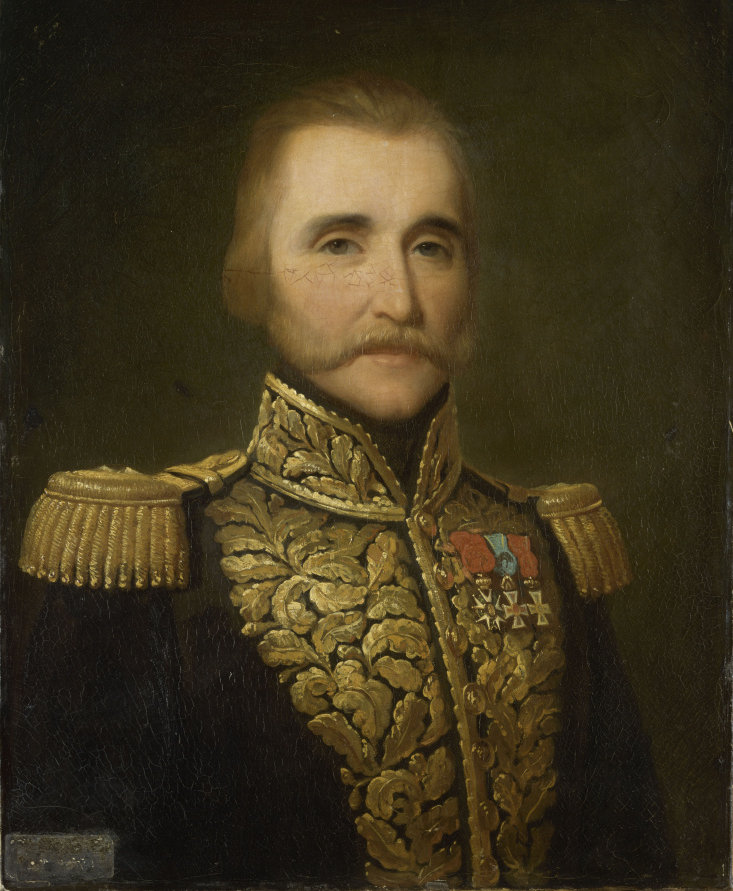
Jean Louis Romeuf (1843)

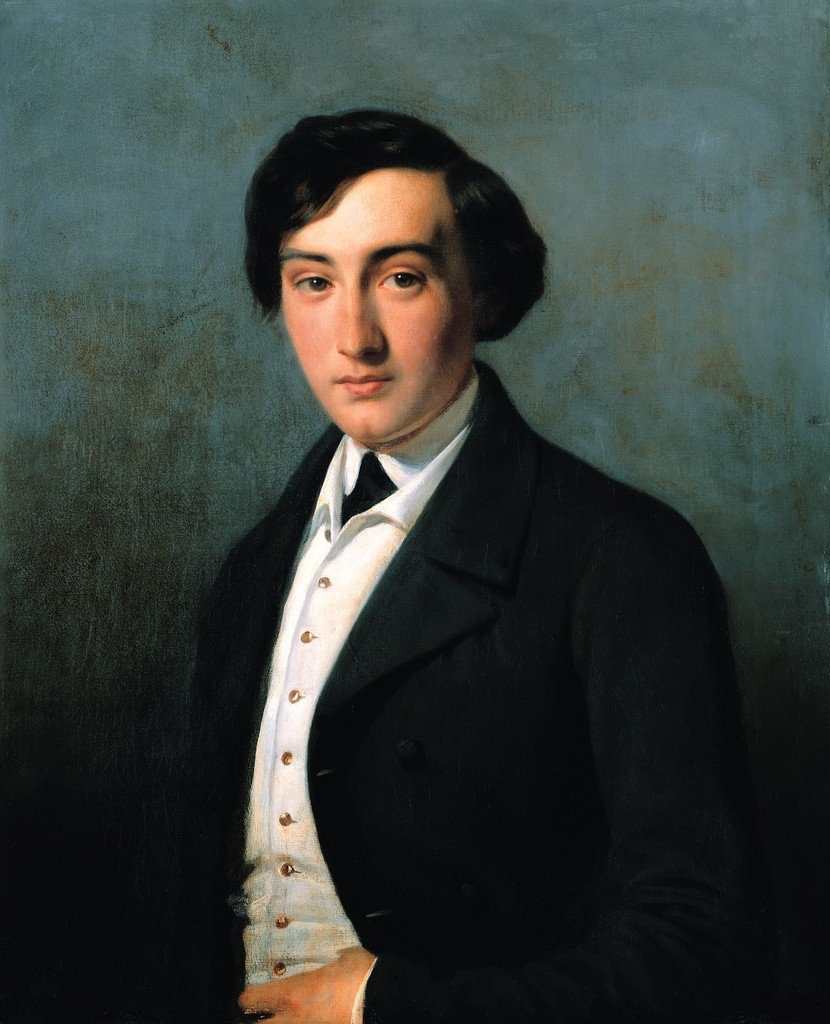
Lucien Petipa (1849)
