= Jean Louis Romeuf =

Jean-Louis Romeuf
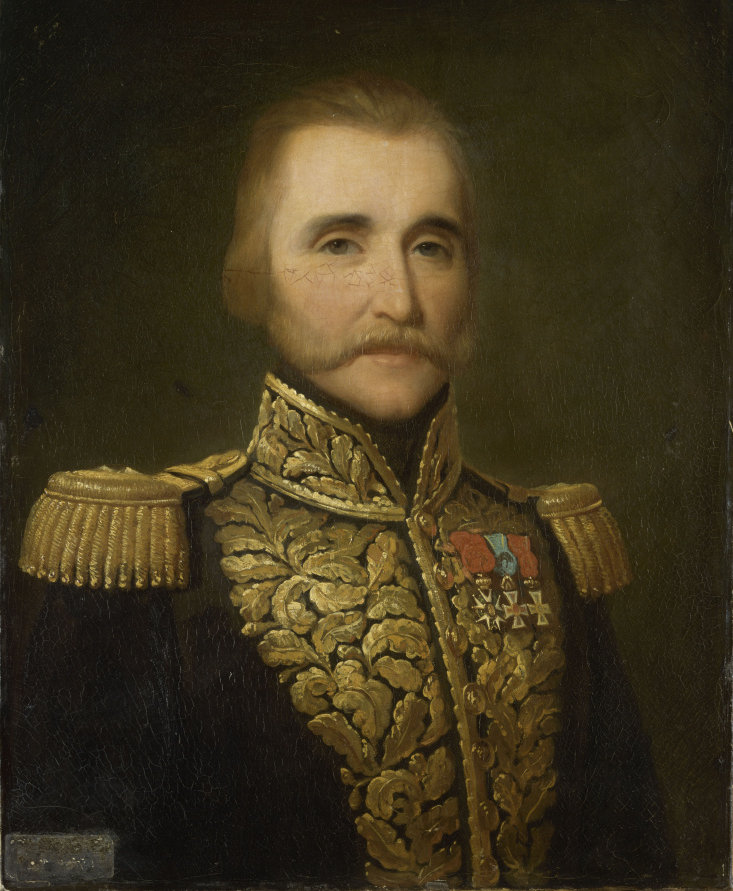
- Portrait by Louise Adélaïde Desnos
- Born: 27 September 1766
- Died: 9 September 1812 (aged 45)
- Allegiance: First French Empire
- Conflicts: Napoleonic Wars; Battle of Borodino (DOW)

Jean-Louis Romeuf (French pronunciation: [ʒɑ̃ lwi ʁɔmœf]; 27 September 1766 – 9 September 1812) was a French general of the First French Empire during the Napoleonic Wars. He was born in the department of Haute-Loire. He began his military service in 1789. He was promoted to general de brigade (brigadier general) in 1811. He was mortally wounded at the Battle of Borodino on 7 September 1812 and died 2 days later.
