= Louis Hersent =

French painter (1777–1860)

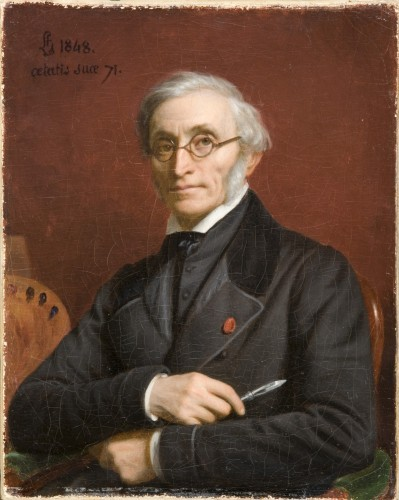
- Self-portrait, 1848
- Born: 10 March 1777; Paris, France
- Died: 2 October 1860 (aged 83)
- Resting place: Père Lachaise Cemetery
- Occupation: Painter

Louis Hersent (10 March 1777 – 2 October 1860) was a French painter.

== Life and career ==
He was born in Paris. He became a pupil of Jacques-Louis David, and obtained the Prix de Rome in 1797. In the Salon of 1802, he showed Metamorphosis of Narcissus, and he continued to exhibit with rare interruptions up to the Salon of 1831. He married Louise-Marie-Jeanne Mauduit in 1821.

His pupils were Louis-Eugène Bertier, Auguste Bigand, Hélène Charlotte Juliette de Bourge, Augustin Luc Demoussy, Henri Joseph Constant Dutilleux, Hippolyte Dominique Holfeld, Jean-Francois-Hyacinthe-Jules Laure, Eugène Modeste Edmond Lepoittevin, Emile Aubert Lessore, Auguste Dominique Mennessier, François Alexandre Pernot, Julie Philipault, August Thomas Pierre Philippe, Pierre Poterlet, Joachim Sotta, Henry de Triqueti, and Théophile Auguste Vauchelet. His most considerable works under the First French Empire were Achilles parting from Briseis, and Atala dying in the arms of Chactas (both engraved in Landon's Annales du Musée); an Incident of the life of Fénelon, painted in 1810, found a place at Malmaison, and Passage of the Bridge at Landshut, which belongs to the same date, is now at Versailles.

Hersent's typical works, however, belong to the period of the Restoration; Louis XVI relieving the Afflicted (Versailles) and Daphnis and Chloë (engraved by Laugier and by Gelée) were both in the Salon of 1817; at that of 1819 the Abdication of Gustavus Vasa brought to Hersent a medal of honour, but the picture, purchased by the Duke of Orléans, was destroyed at the Palais-Royal in 1848, and the engraving by Henriquel-Dupont is now its sole record. Ruth, produced in 1822, became the property of Louis XVIII, who from the moment that Hersent rallied to the Restoration patronized him, made him officer of the Legion of Honour, and pressed his claims at the Institut de France (Académie des Beaux-Arts), where he replaced van Spaendonck.

He continued in favour under Charles X, for whom was executed Monks of Mount St Gotthard, exhibited in 1824. In 1831, Hersent made his last appearance at the Salon with portraits of Louis Philippe, Marie Amélie and the duke of Montpensier; that of the kingwas not considered by the anonymous author in the Encyclopædia Britannica Eleventh Edition as equal to the portrait of Spontini (Berlin), which the author considered probably Hersent's chef-d'œuvre.

After this date, Hersent ceased to exhibit at the yearly salons. Although in 1846 he sent a likeness of Delphine Gay and one or two other works to the rooms of the Société d'Artistes, he could not be tempted from his usual reserve even by the international contest of 1855.

== Gallery ==
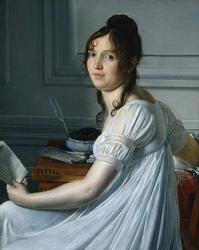
Sophie Crouzet by Hersent, c. 1801

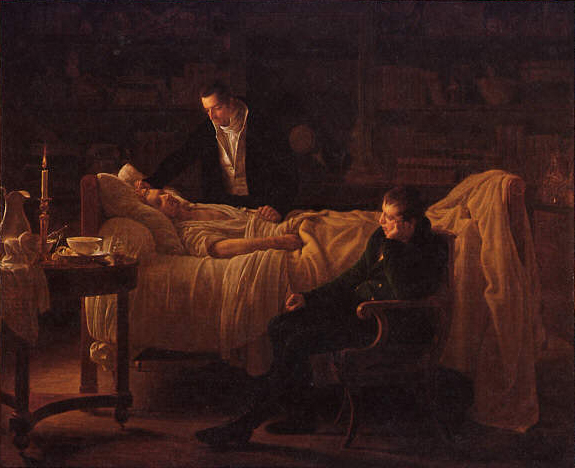
Mort de Xavier Bichat ou Bichat mourant assisté par les D^{rs} Esparron et Roux (Exhibited at Salon of 1817)

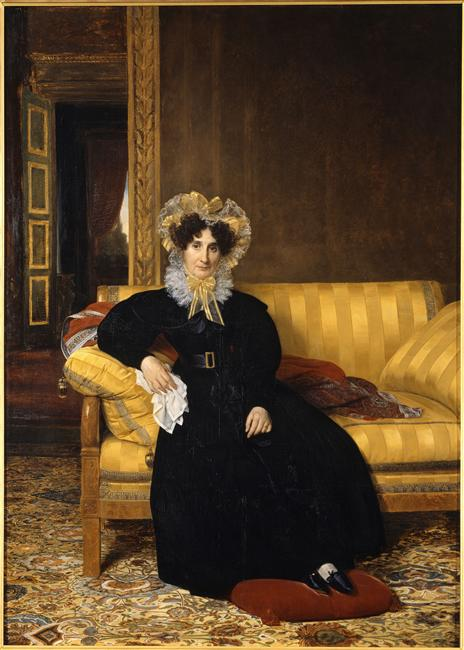
Portrait de Madame Jean-Charles Clarmont, née Rosalie Favrin (1772-1858), 1828

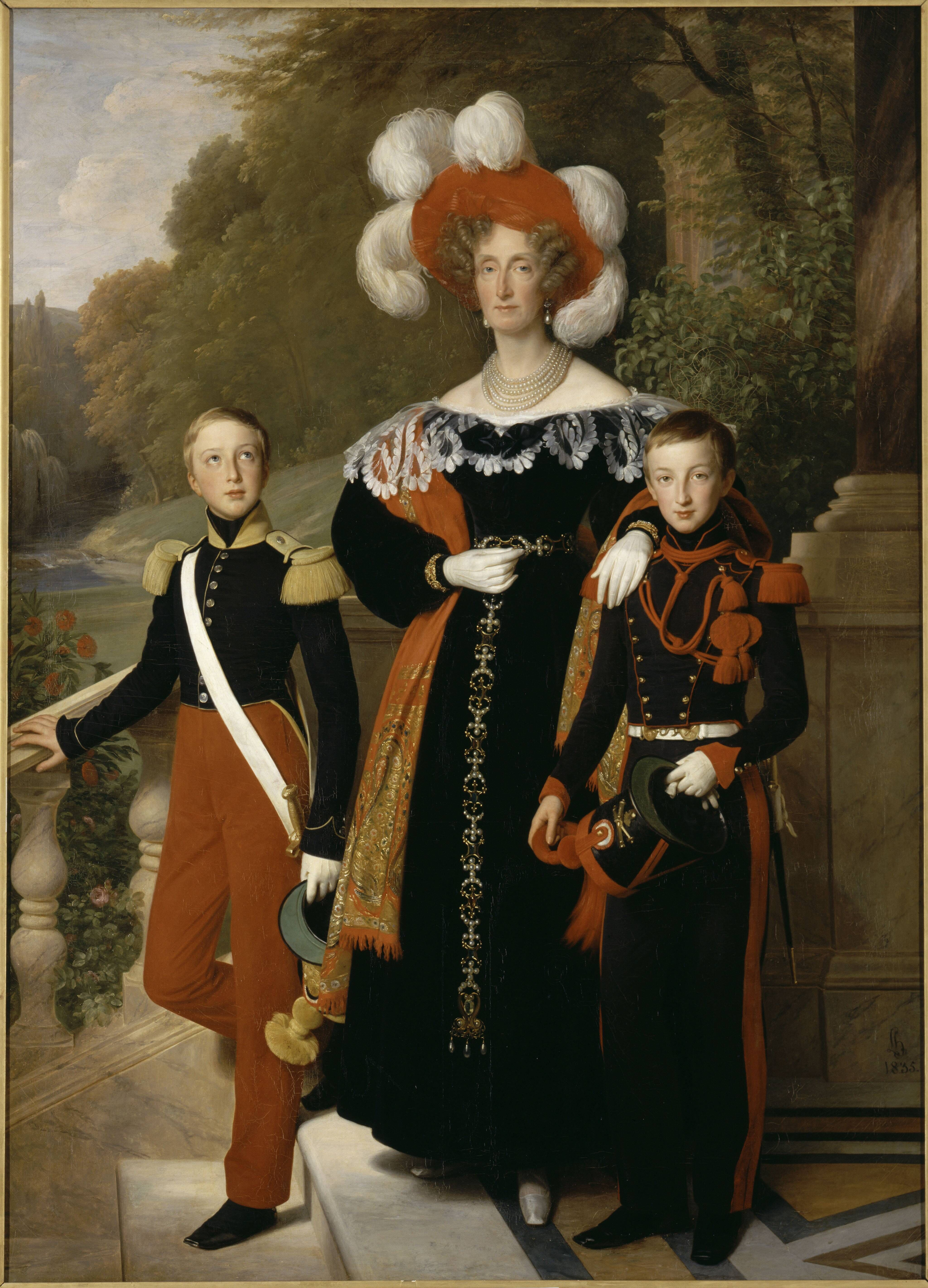
La Reine Marie-Amélie et ses Enfants, 1835

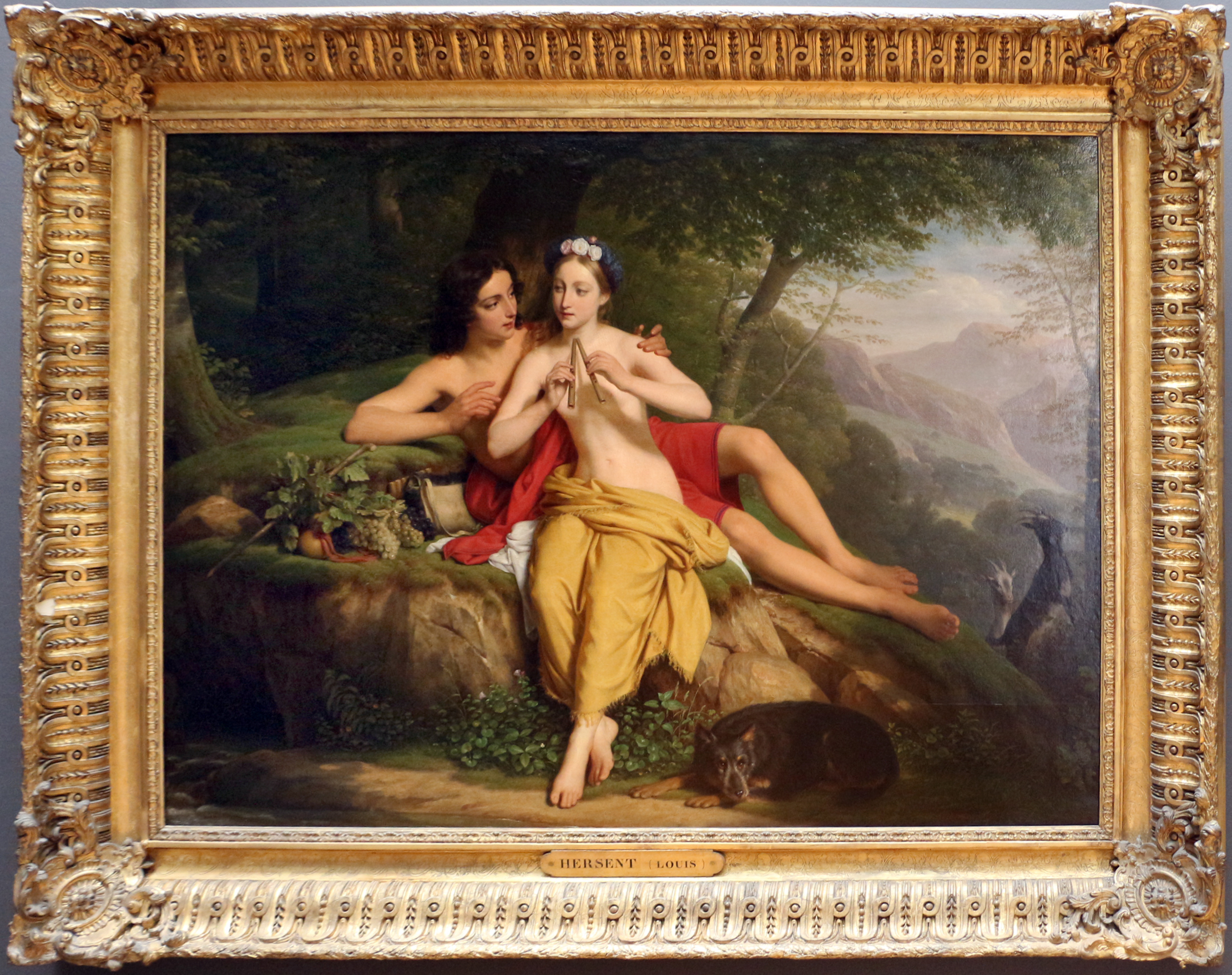
Daphnis and Chloé
