= Julie Philipault =

French painter (1780–1834)

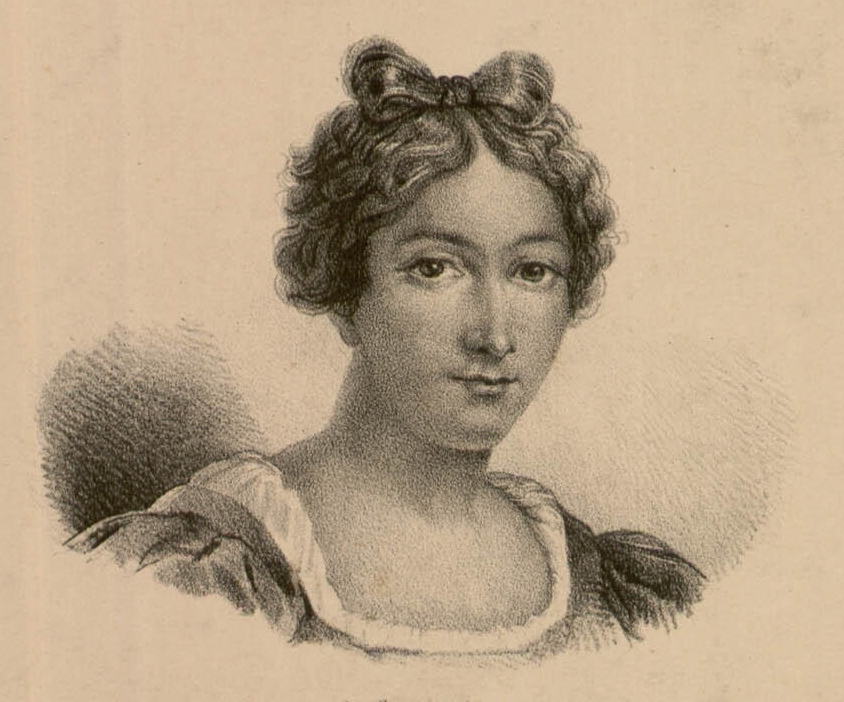
- Portrait of Julie Philipault, 1836, lithograph after Julie Forestier
- Born: Marie-Julie-Victoire Chipault; 9 May 1780; Paris, France
- Died: 23 November 1834 (aged 54); Paris, France

Julie Philipault (Paris, 9 May 1780 – Paris, 23 November 1834) was a French painter.

== Biography ==
Marie-Julie-Victoire Chipault, known as Philpaut. (or Phlipault, Philipault), was born on 9 May 1780 in Paris, in the Saint-Gervais quarter of the 4th arrondissement She was the daughter of Louis-Chrisostome Chipault, and his wife, Marie-Élisabeth-Victoire Deschamps de Vallièrre.

Student of Louise Hersent, she won medals at the Salons of 1814 and 1817. She is one of only twenty-one women artists to have works in the collections of the Louvre.

She died in the 10th arrondissement of Paris on 23 November 1834.

== Selected works ==
- Racine reading Athalie in front of Louis XIV and Madame de Maintenon (1819), oil on canvas, Louvre, Paris.
- Young Shepherdess admiring Herself in the Water (1821), oil on canvas, Louvre, Paris (currently on loan to Castelnaudary Town Hall).
- Portrait de Marie-Sylphide Calès, née Chardou (1800–10), oil on canvas, musée des Beaux-Arts d'Orléans, Orléans.
- Portrait of the Painter Jean Henry Marlet, oil on canvas, Musée Cantini, Marseille.
Gallery of Works by Julie Philipault

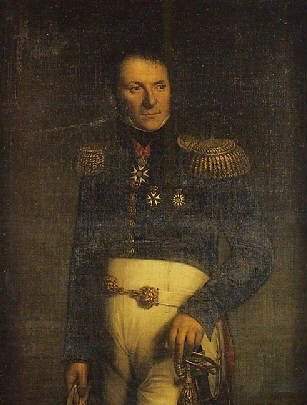
Portrait of colonel Charles-Marie Galté, (1812)

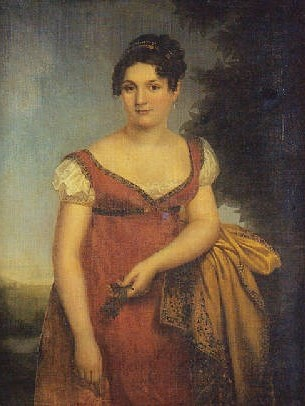
Portrait of Madame Galté, née Angélique-Louise-Rose De Busne, (1812)

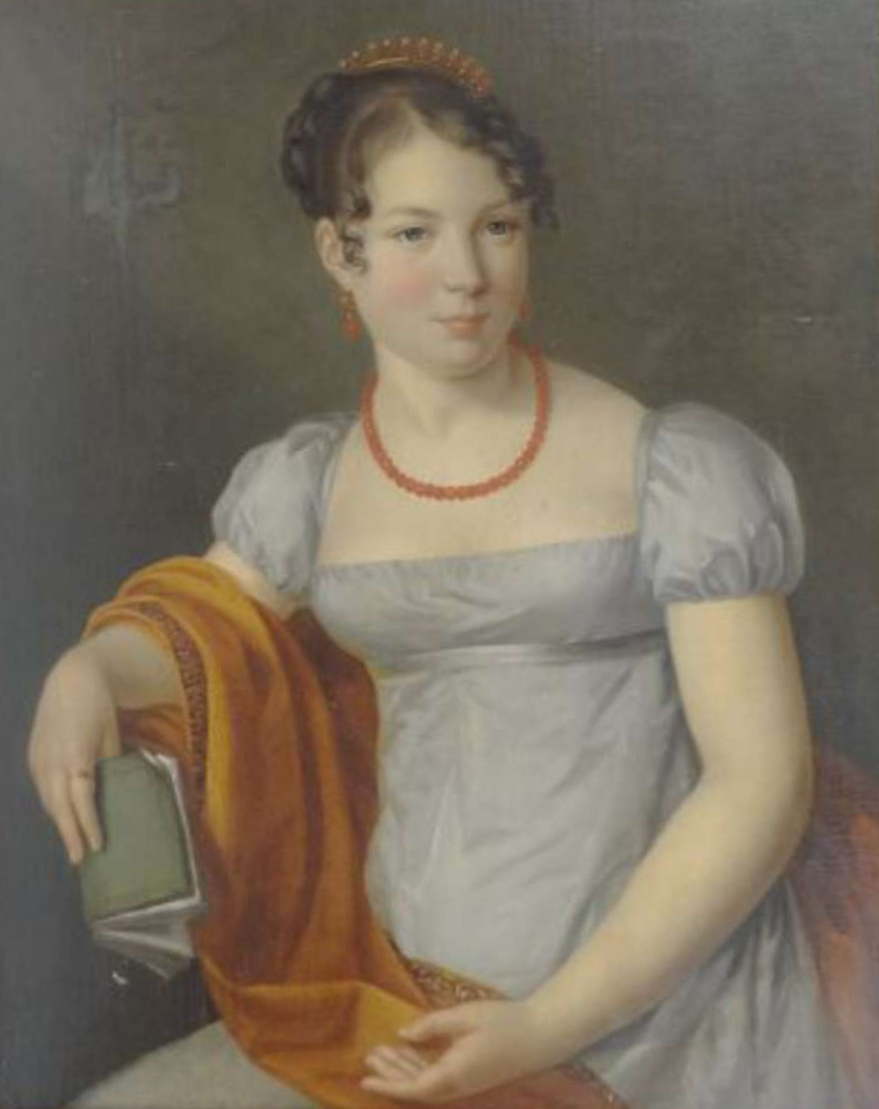
Portrait of a Woman holding a Book, (1815)

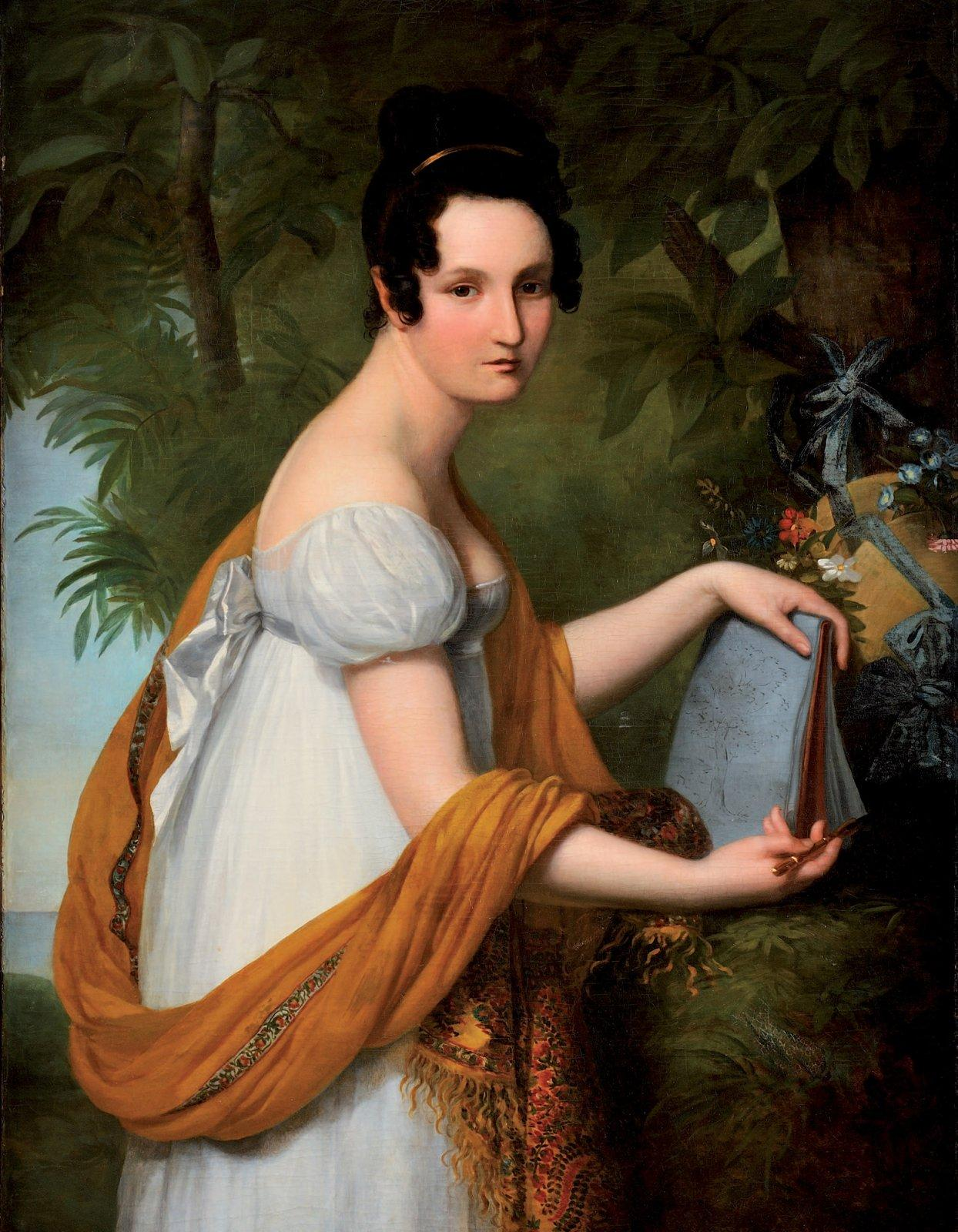
Young Woman Drawing, (1817)

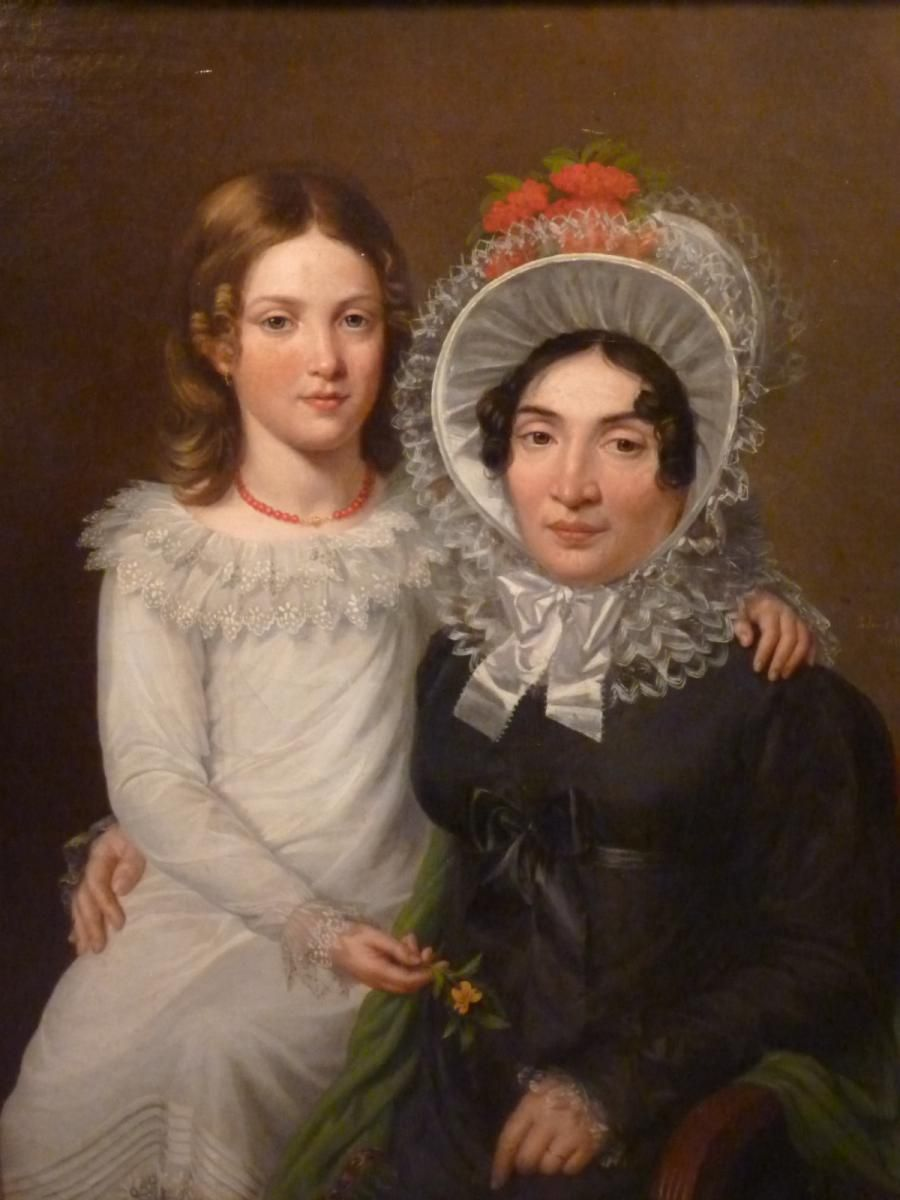
A Mother and Her Daughter, (1818)

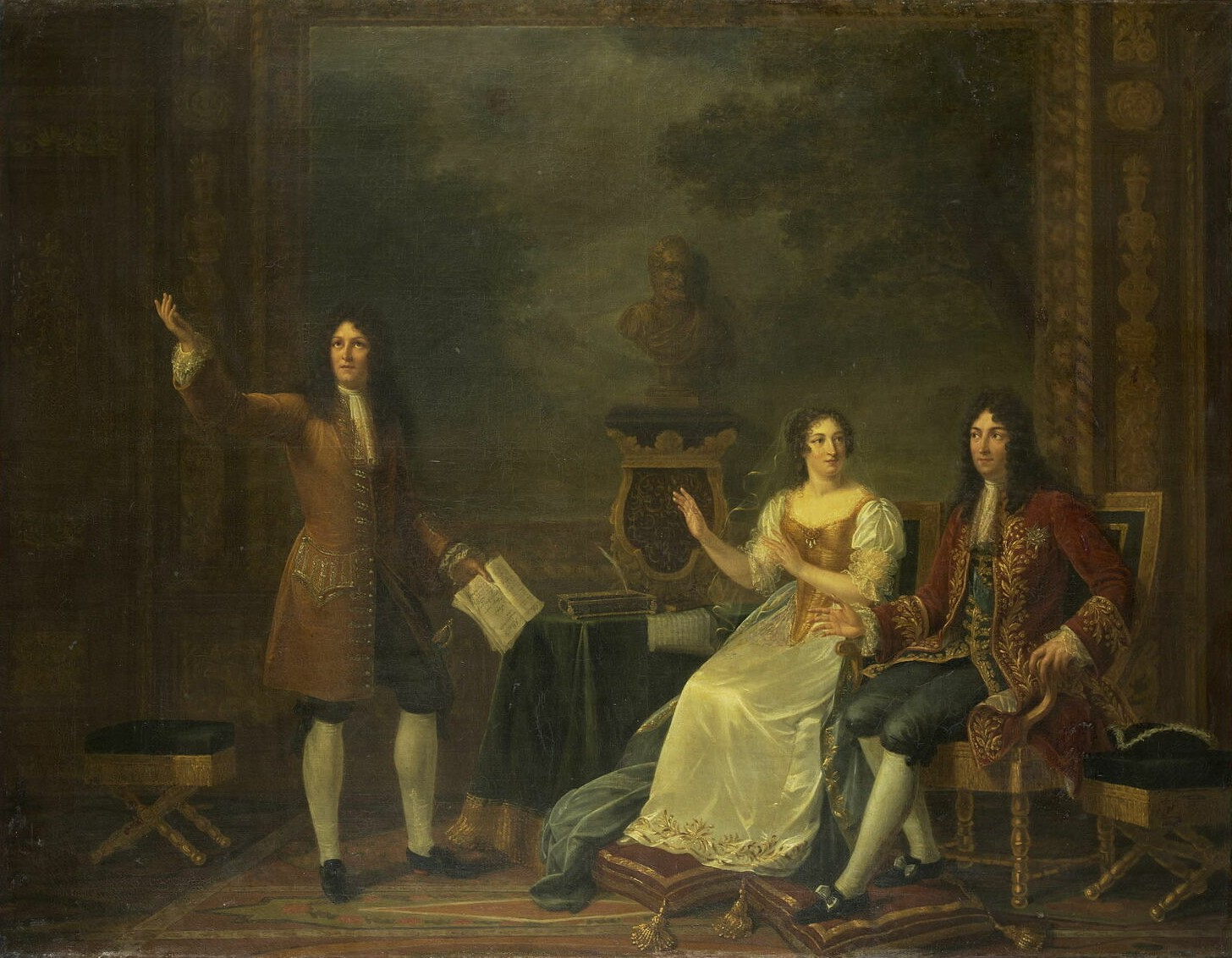
Racine reading Athalie in front of Louis XIV and Madame de Maintenon (1819), musée du Louvre, Paris

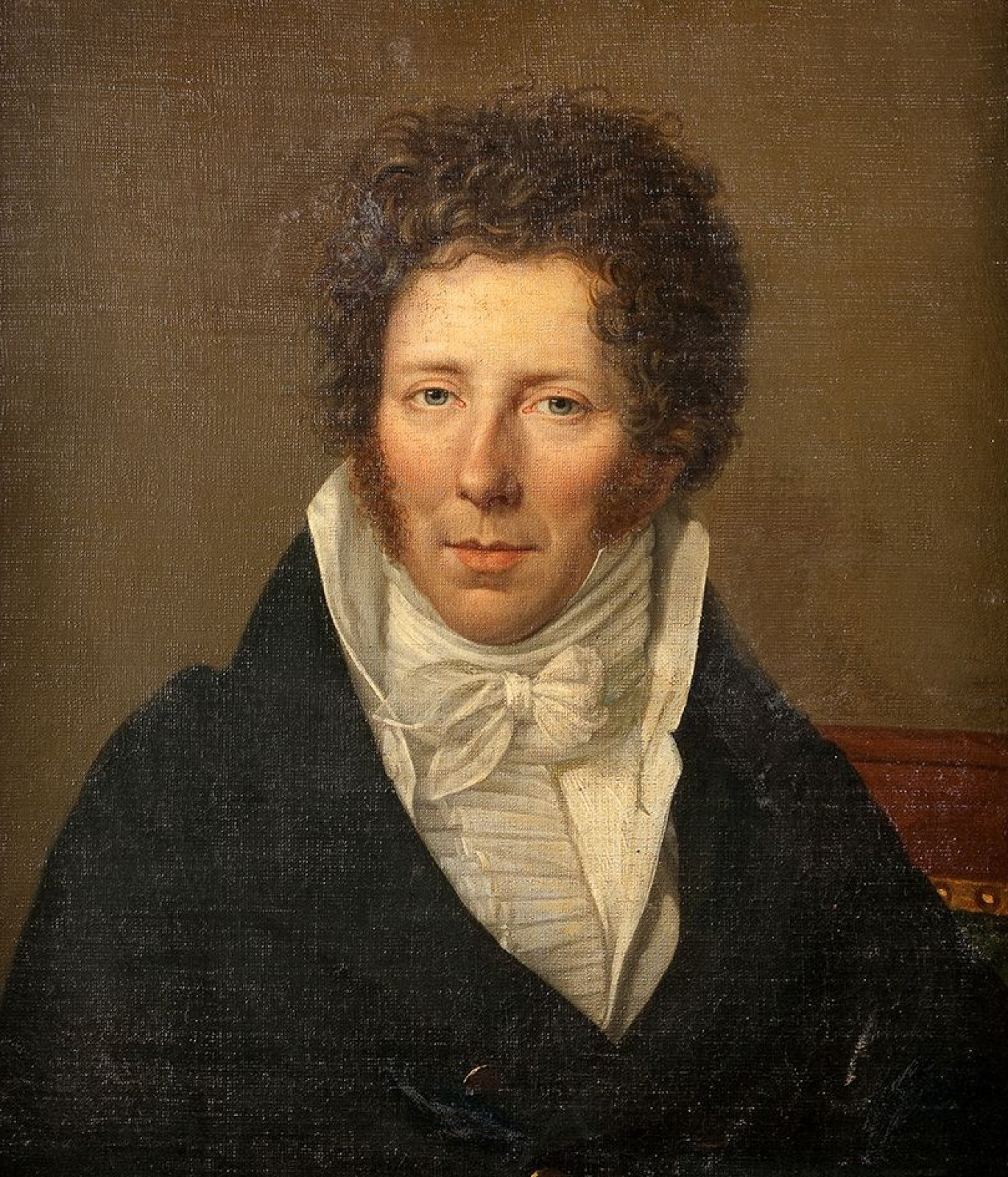
Portrait of a Man, (1819)

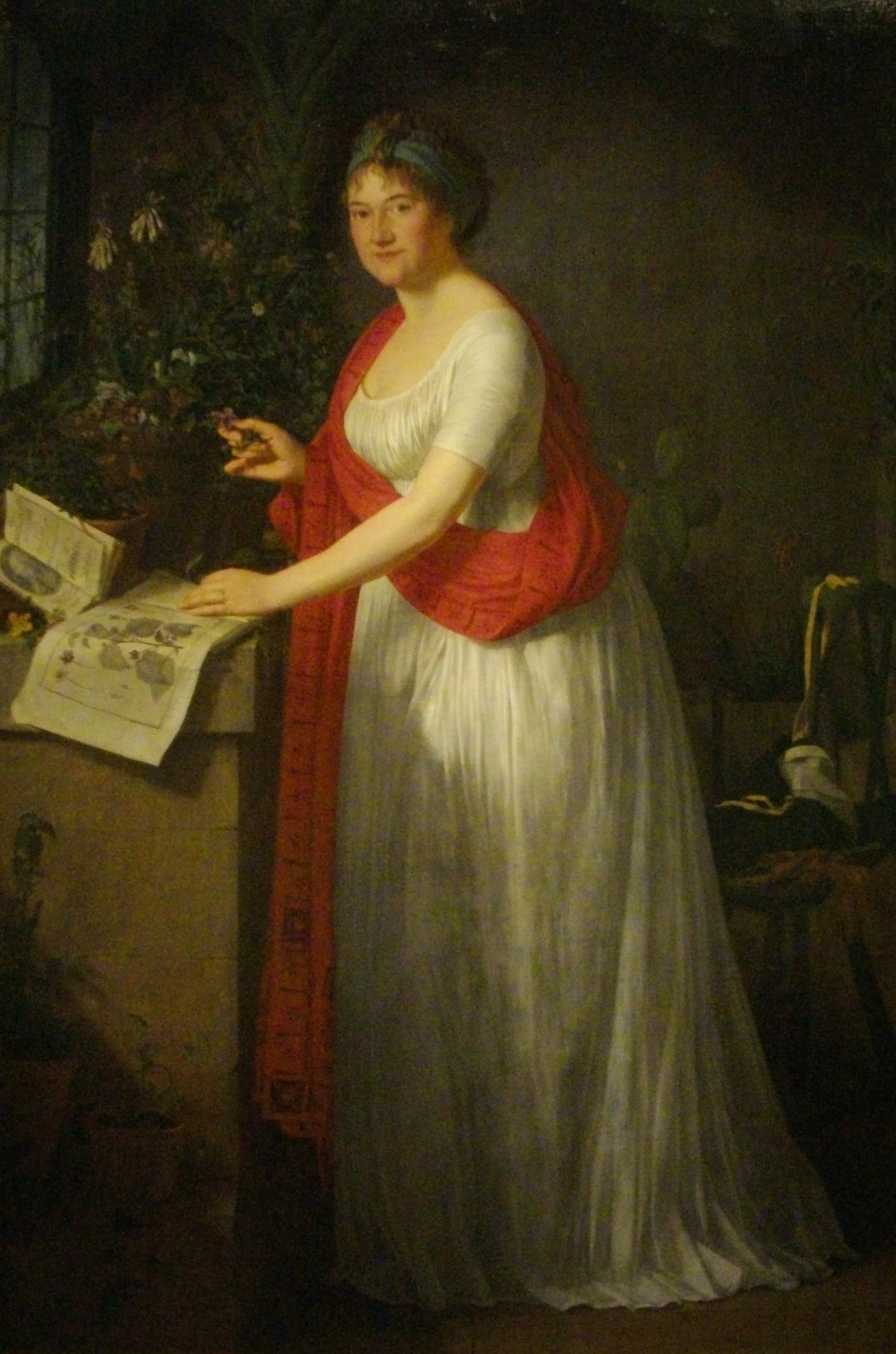
Portrait of Marie-Sylphide Calès, née Chardou, (1800–10), musée des Beaux-Arts d'Orléans, Orléans

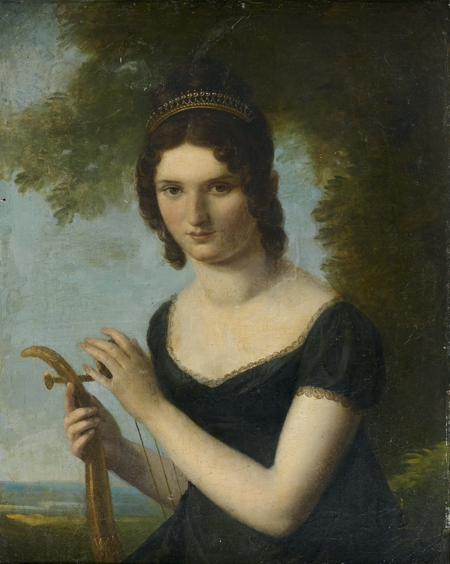
Presumed Portrait of Madame Jourdan playing the Lyre in a Landscape

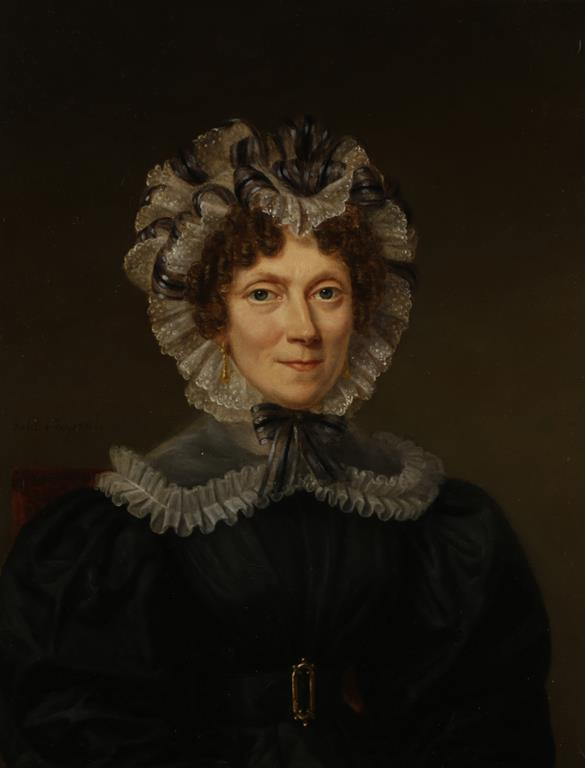
Portrait of a Lady wearing a Black Dress

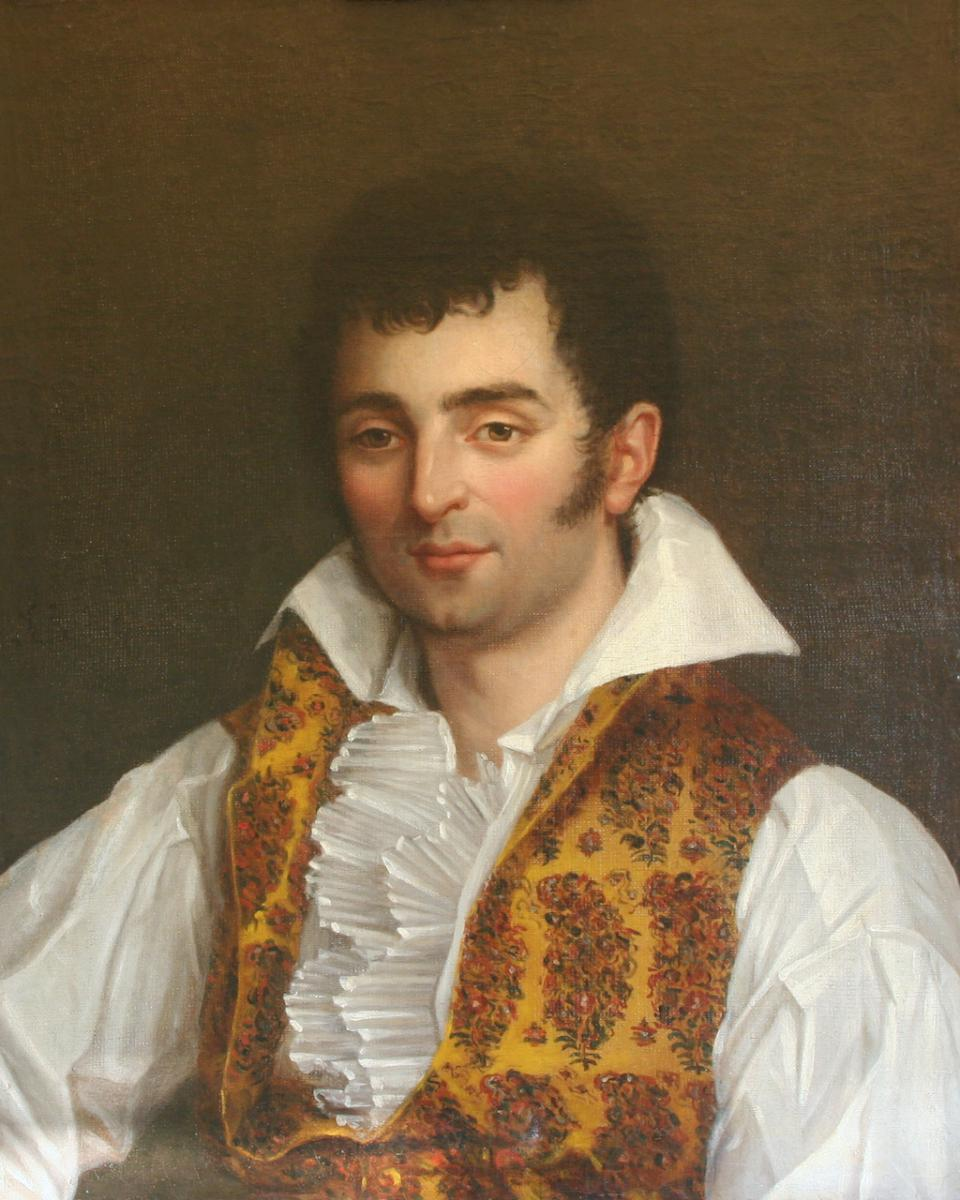
Portrait of a Man in an Embroidered Waistcoat
