= Léocadie Hersent-Penquer =

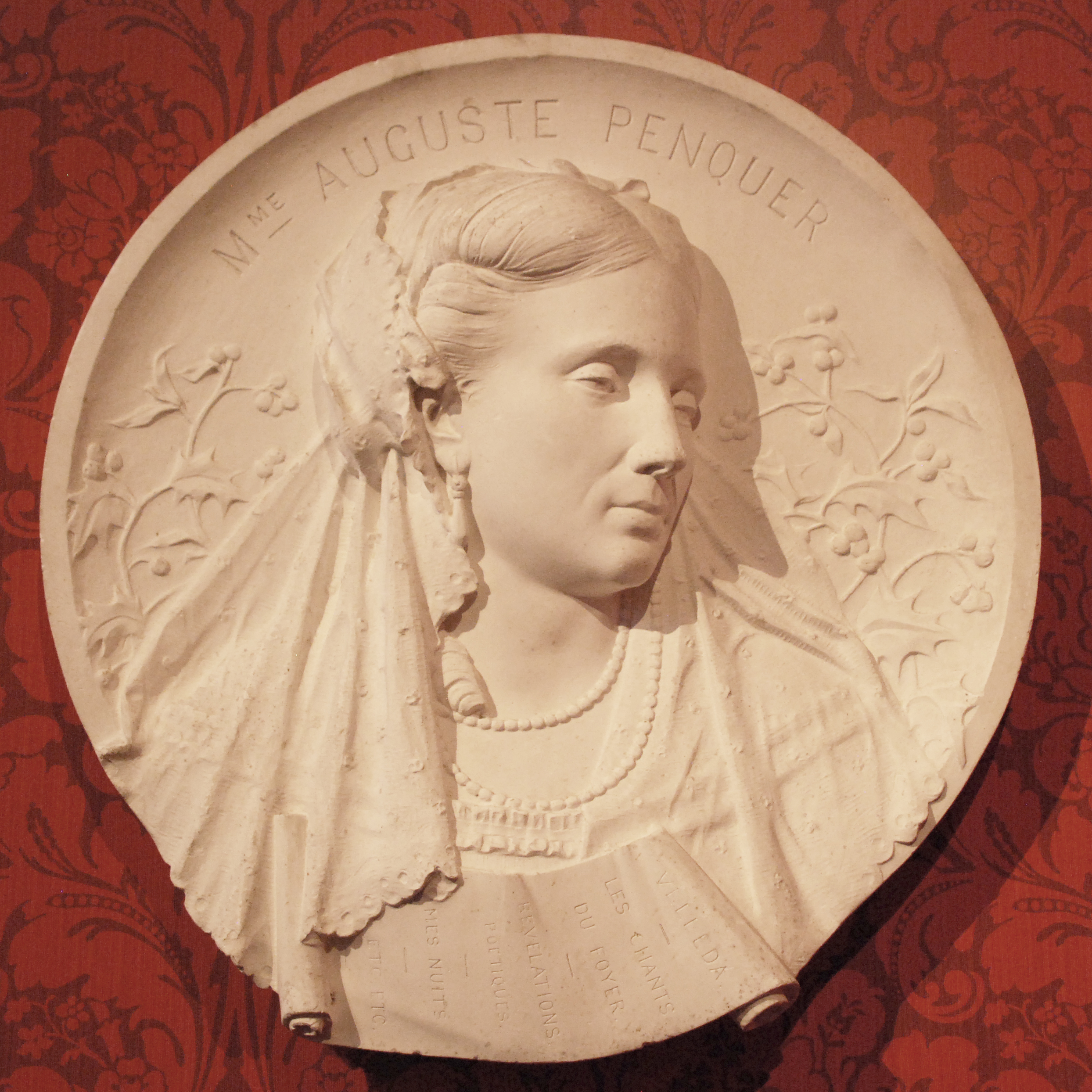
- Medallion of Léocadie Penquer created by Cyprien Godebski for the Musée des Beaux-Arts of Brest
- Born: Alexandrine Françoise Éloïse Léocadie Hersent; 14 February 1817; Lannilis, France
- Died: 19 December 1889 (72 years old); Brest
- Burial place: Saint Martin Cemetery, Brest
- Other name: Léocadie Salaün-Penquer or Mme. Auguste Salaün-Penquer
- Occupations: Poet, Writer, Museum co-founder
- Spouse(s): Victor Burle (d. 1849), Auguste Salaün-Penquer (1809-1882)
- Children: Yves (1853-1854), Marie (1854-1933)

Léocadie Hersent-Penquer (1817–1889) was a French poet, writer and co-founder of the Musée des Beaux-Arts of Brest, France.

Hersent-Penquer, sometimes known as Léocadie Salaün-Penquer or Mme Auguste Salaün-Penquer, was born on 14 February 1817 into an established Breton family living at Château de Kerouartz near Lannilis in northwest France, where today a street is named after her. Her father was the doctor Jacques Hersent and her maternal grandfather was said to be General Marc-Antoine Coban (1763–1813), who died before she was born.

== Early years ==
In 1842, she married the second-lieutenant Victor Burle but seven years later, in 1849, she became a widow at the age of 32.

She married again on 15 September 1851, this time to the doctor Auguste Salaün-Penquer (1809–1882) and became known as Léocadie Hersent-Penquer. They settled in his hometown of Brest and had two children, Yves and Marie, but only their daughter lived to adulthood. She died in 1933.

== Literary life ==
On many occasions, especially during winter months, Hersent-Penquer visited many Parisian literary salons. There she met, among others, the writers José-Maria de Heredia, Victor Hugo, Alphonse de Lamartine and Charles Leconte de Lisle, all of whom would have a significant influence on her literary work. Hugo actively supported and encouraged her writing efforts. Leconte de Lisle introduced her to the other poets belonging to the Parnassians movement, and soon she and her husband became part of vibrant literary circles in Paris.

Of her first novel, Chants du Foyer, one reviewer, Alphose Séché, said, "One finds there, expressed with feeling and harmony, the thoughts of the girl, the young woman and the young mother. Beside a great spiritualistic faith, there is, in this book, a profound feeling of nature."

According to Séché, her second novel, Poetic Revelations, was directly influenced by Victor Hugo. Although Séché found its tone to be more serious, he said it contained more emphasis on ideas, and less on feelings. When comparing it to her first book, he concluded: "the language is more flexible and more visual and the inspiration harmonious and brilliant."

Back in her hometown of Brest, she followed the traditions she learned in the Paris salons, organizing literary soirees at her home. There she also read from her latest works, as she had in Paris. Together with her husband Auguste (who served as mayor of Brest from 1871 to 1881), they founded an art museum (Musée des Beaux-Arts of Brest) in 1875 and arranged funding for it from the municipality.

She and her second husband were both named honorary members of the Brest Academic Society, which declared Hersent-Penquer the "Muse of Brest."

== Later years ==
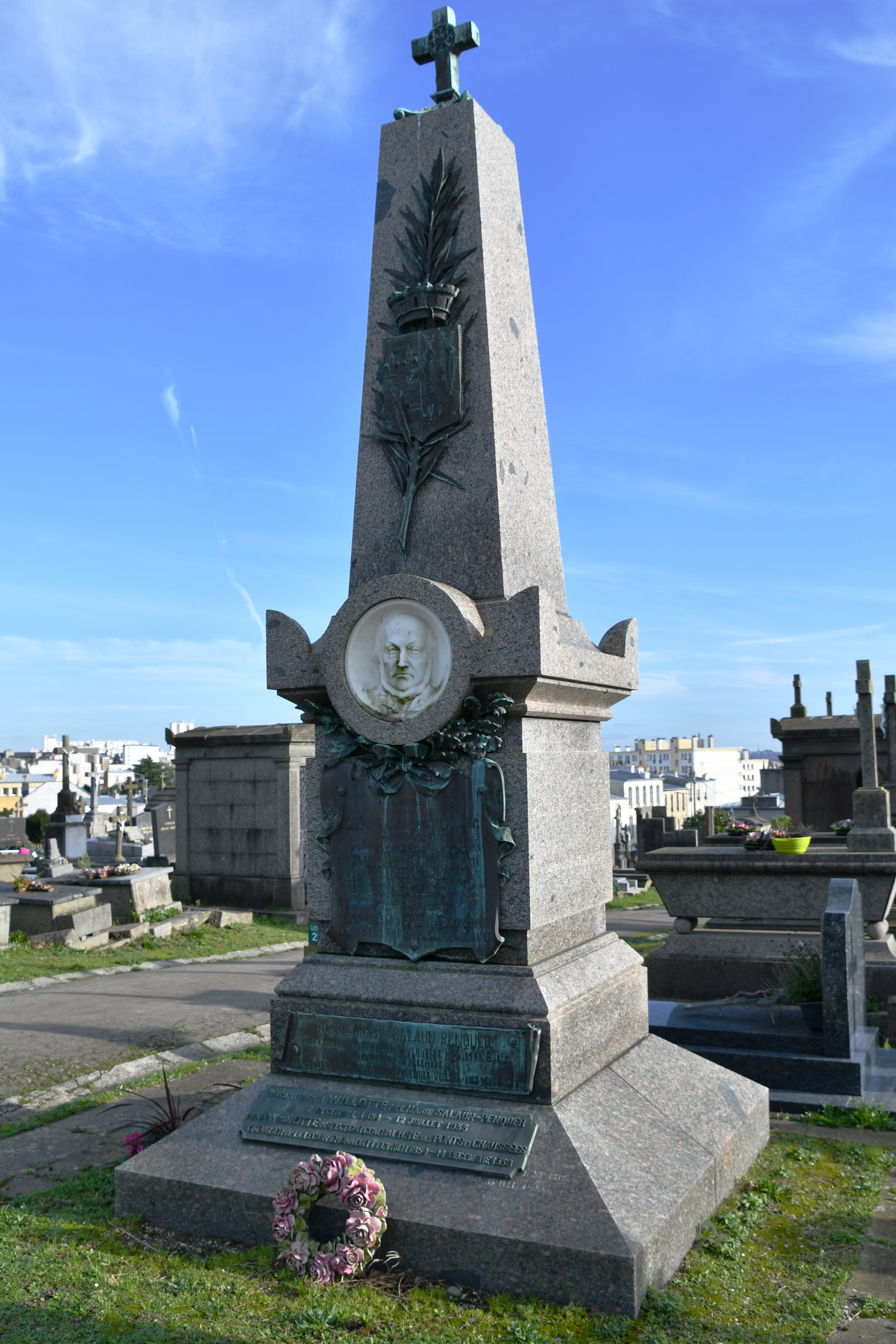
Tomb of Léocadie Hersent-Penquer and Auguste Salaün-Penquer designed by Bartholdi.

After her husband Auguste died of pneumonia in 1882, Hersent-Penquer gave a commission to the prolific sculptor Frédéric-Auguste Bartholdi (famous for his Statue of Liberty in New York) for a monument dedicated to her husband and where she could be interred as well. The completed granite tomb was erected in St. Martin Cemetery in Brest.

Following her husband's death, she retired from social life and devoted her time to her children and grandchildren.

Hersent-Penquer died at age 71 on 19 December 1889 in Brest. Her eulogy was given by the president of the Brest Academic Society, who lauded her many literary accomplishments and wide influence and caller her "a poet in the most noble sense of the word."

== Selected works ==
Hersent-Penquer's first poem, one about loneliness, was written at the age of 16.

Many of her poems and plays were published under the names Léocadie Hersent-Penquer or Léocadie Salaün-Penquer although some work, such as her epic poem (370 pages in length) Vélléda ("which glorifies Brittany, and the Christian idea") and Le Paradis retrouvé, and others, list the author as “Mme Auguste Penquer.”

=== Narratives and poems ===
- Les chants du foyer. 1862
- Les révélations poétiques. 1864
- À propos des arbres du Luxembourg. 1866
- Vélléda. 1868
- Le Paradis retrouvé. 1869
- La payse. 1888
- Mes nuits. 1891 (published posthumously)

=== Plays ===
- Marcelline. 1870
- Syndoryx. Le barde de Penmarc'h. 1870
- L'œillet rose. 1874
