= Van Spaendonck =

Van Spaendonck is a Dutch surname. Notable people with the surname include:

- Cornelis van Spaendonck (1756–1839), Dutch painter, brother of Gerard
- Gerard van Spaendonck (1746–1822), Dutch painter
