= Louise Marie-Jeanne Hersent-Mauduit =

French painter (1784–1862)

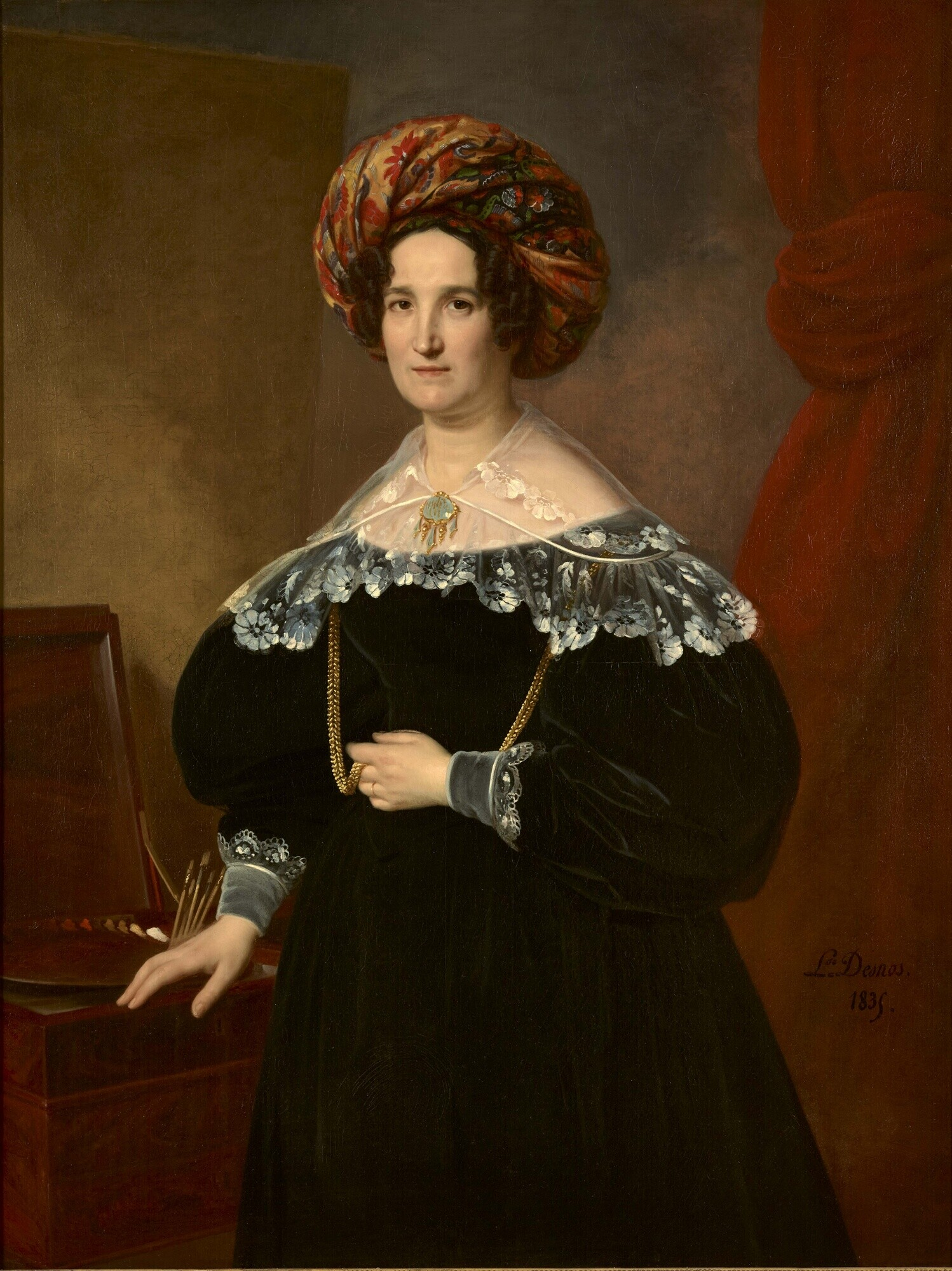
- 1835 portrait of Hersent by Louise Adélaïde Desnos, one of her students
- Born: Louise Marie Jeanne Mauduit; 7 March 1784; Paris
- Died: 7 January 1862 (aged 77); Paris
- Spouse: Louis Hersent

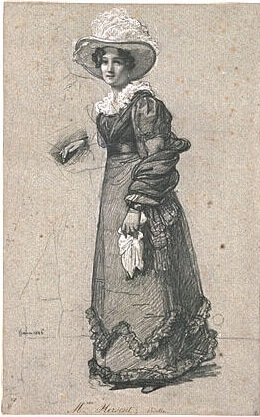
Sketch of Hersent by François Joseph Heim for his large group portrait of artists featuring Charles X Distributing Awards to Artists Exhibiting at the Salon of 1824 at the Louvre, 1827, Louvre

Louise Marie-Jeanne Hersent-Mauduit (7 March 1784 – 7 January 1862) was a French oil painter, primarily of portraits and historical scenes.

From 1810 to 1824, her works were exhibited at the Paris Salon, and she received two first-class medals at the Salon of 1817 and Salon of 1819. Jean Baptiste Tardieu engraved several of her works.

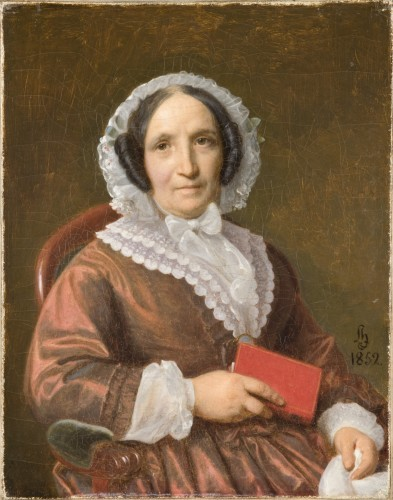
Portrait of Louise Hersent (1852) by her husband, Louis Hersent

== Biography ==
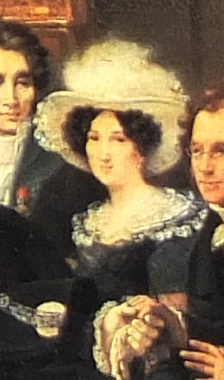
Hersent depicted in François Joseph Heim's 1827 painting, Charles X Distributing Awards to Artists Exhibiting at the Salon of 1824

Louise Marie-Jeanne Mauduit was born in Paris on 7 March 1784 to an unknown mother and Antoine-René Mauduit, an architect and mathematician.

In 1810, her works were first displayed at the Paris Salon, and would be displayed until 1824. Her artworks obtained first-class medals in 1817 and 1819.

She studied under Charles Meynier and possibly her husband, Louis Hersent.

In 1821, she married the painter Louis Hersent. Her husband is also notable for his portrait and history paintings.

Hersent herself took on female pupils, among them the porcelain painter Marie Virginie Boquet and portrait painter Louise Adélaïde Desnos.

== Gallery ==
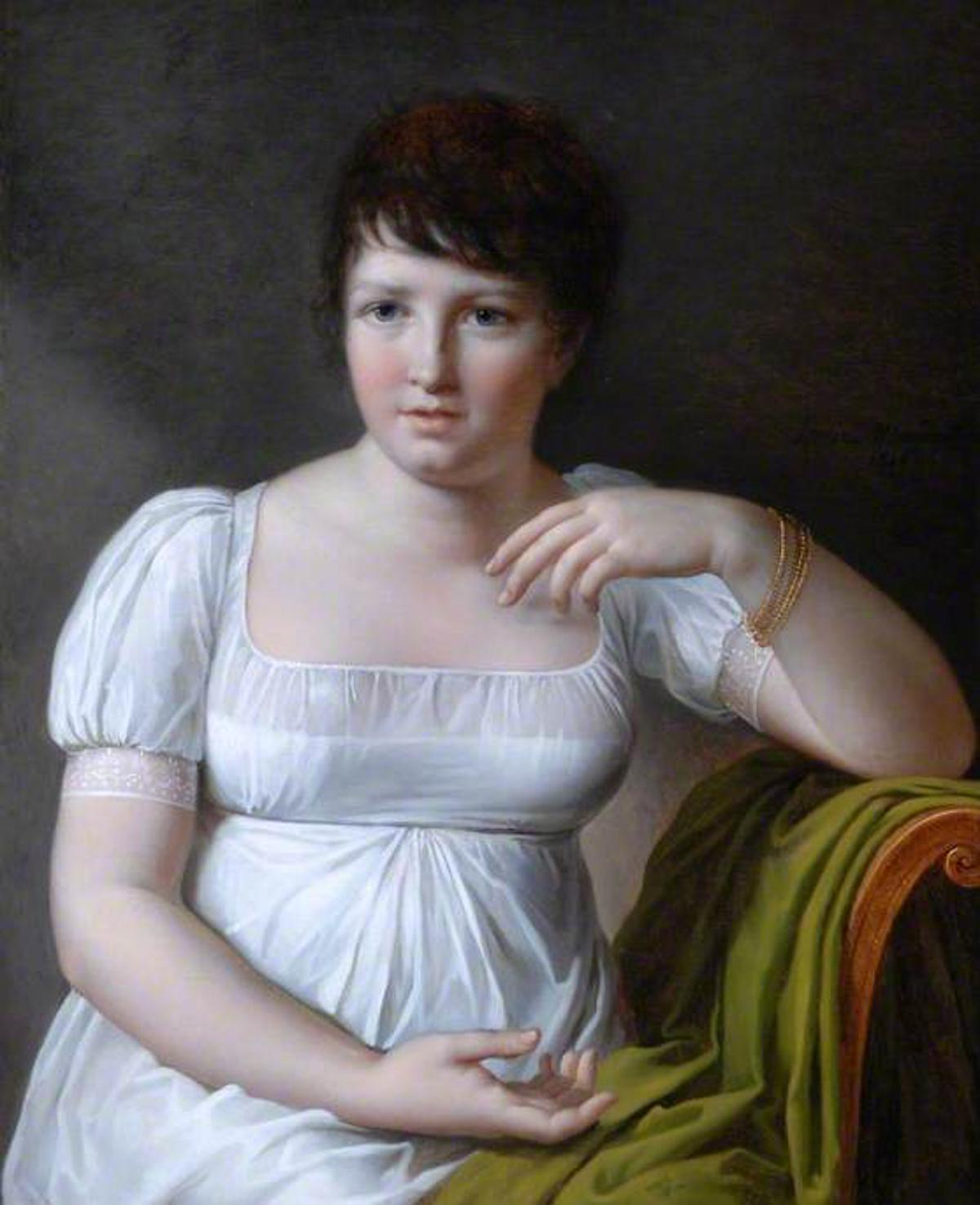
Portrait of a woman, falsely said to be Pauline Bonaparte, 1806

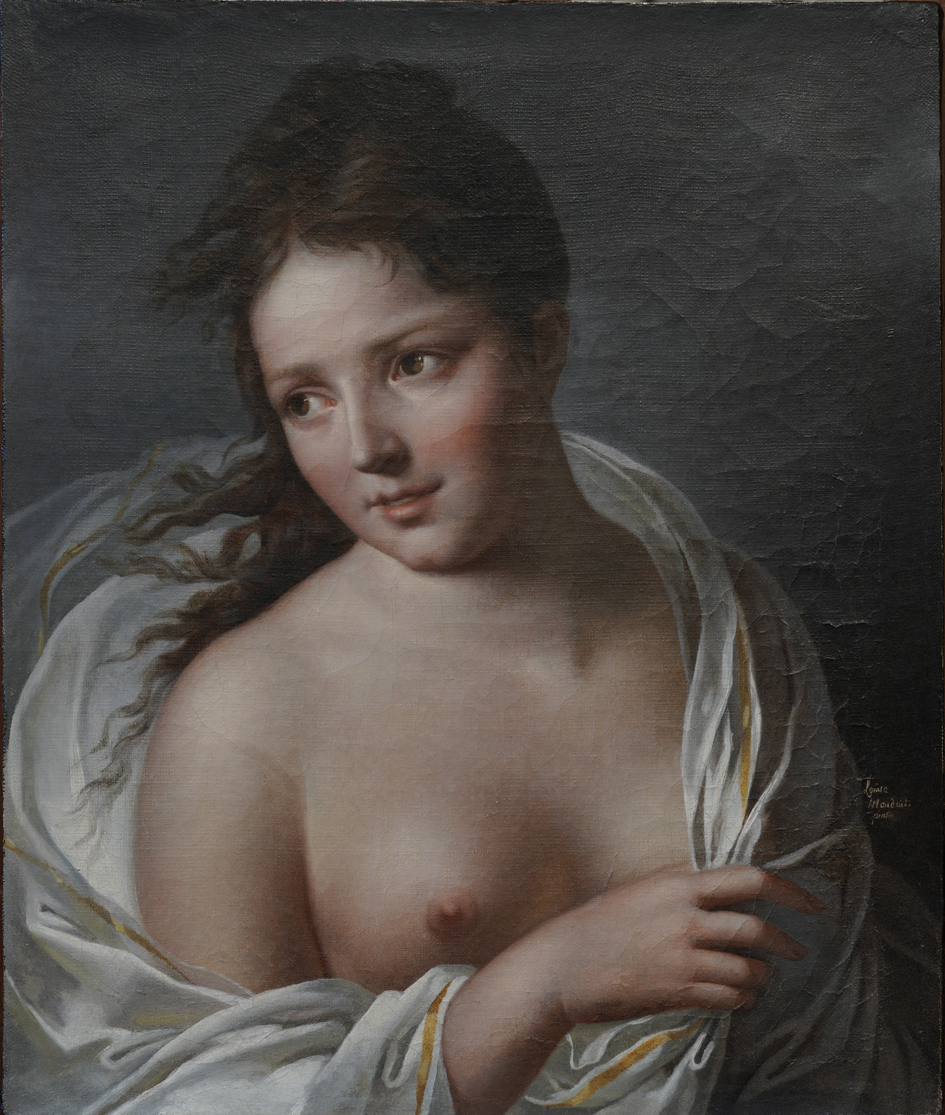
Nymph, c. 1810

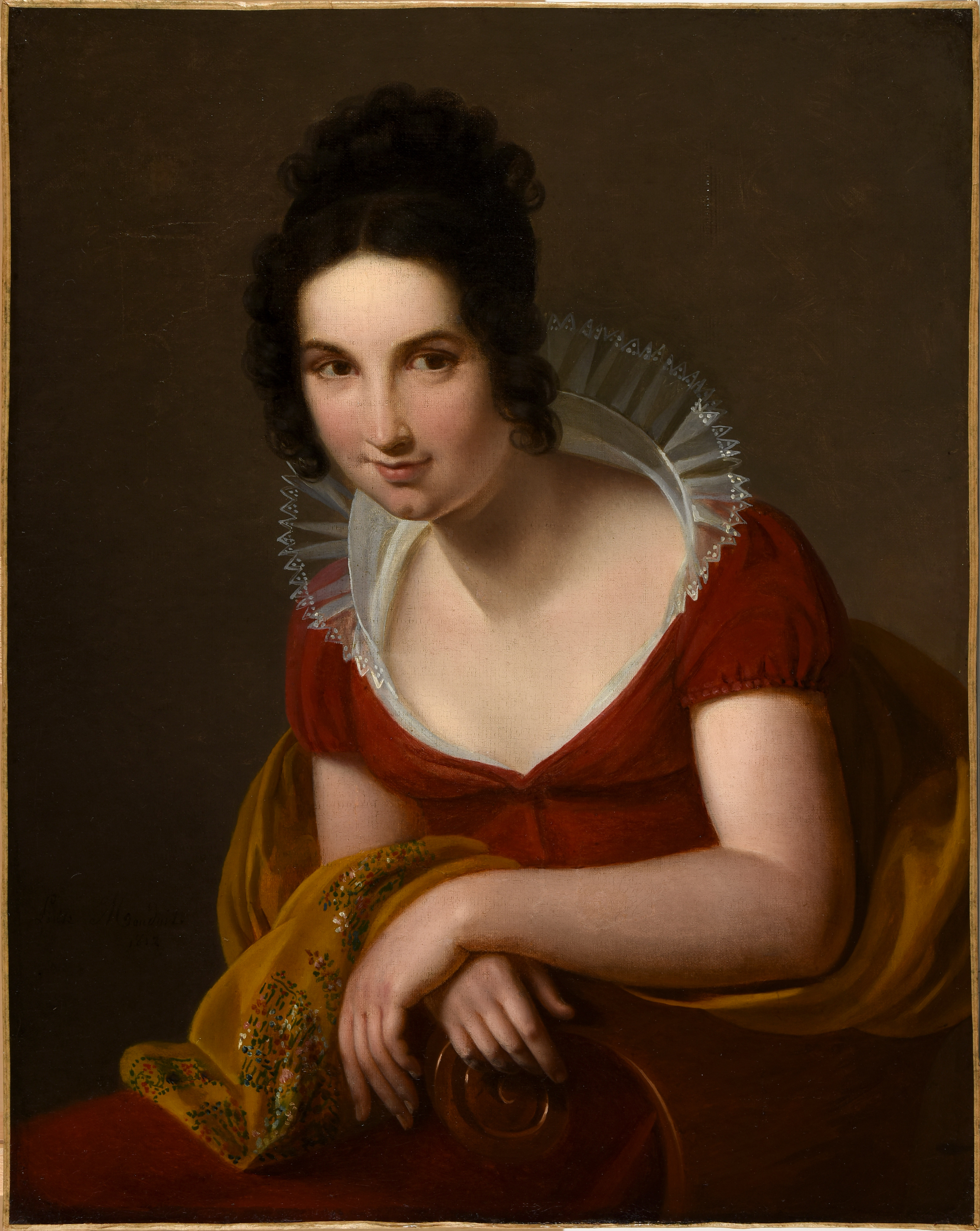
Portrait of an anonymous woman, 1812

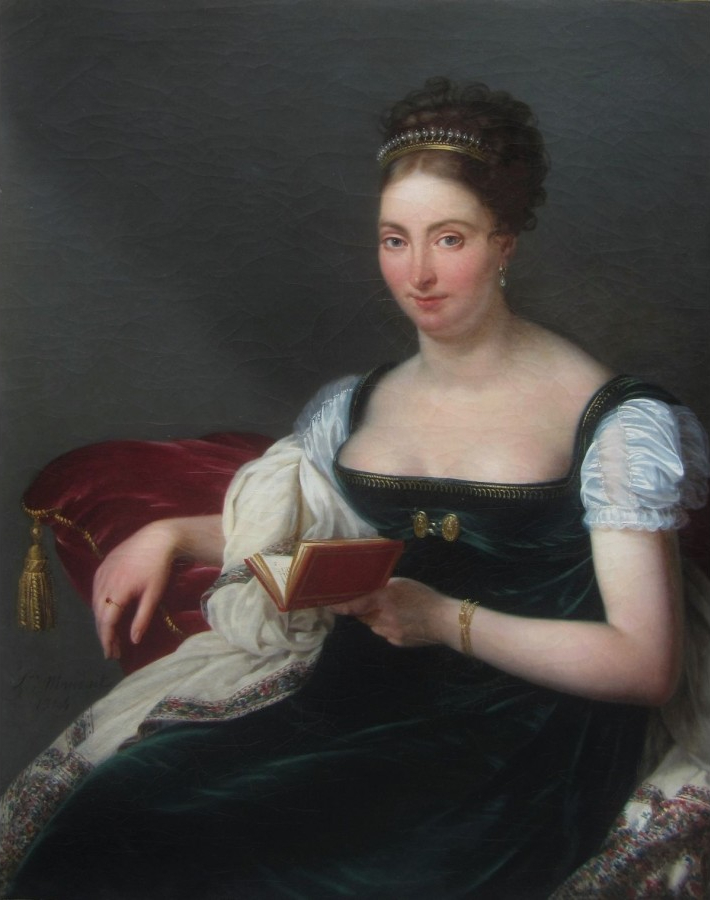
Portrait of a woman holding a book, 1814.

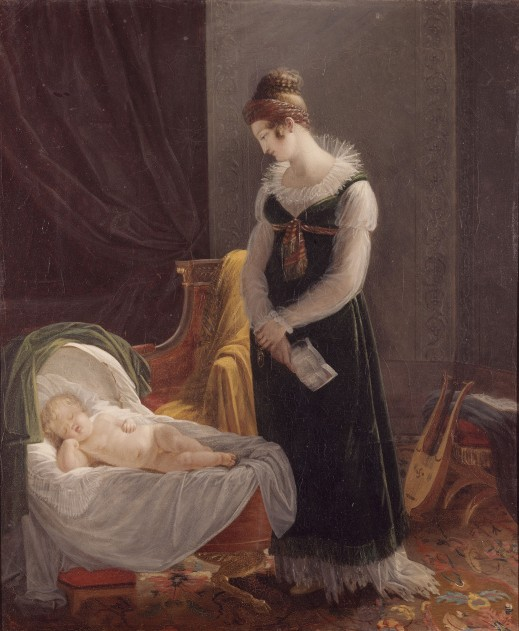
The Good Mother, 1814

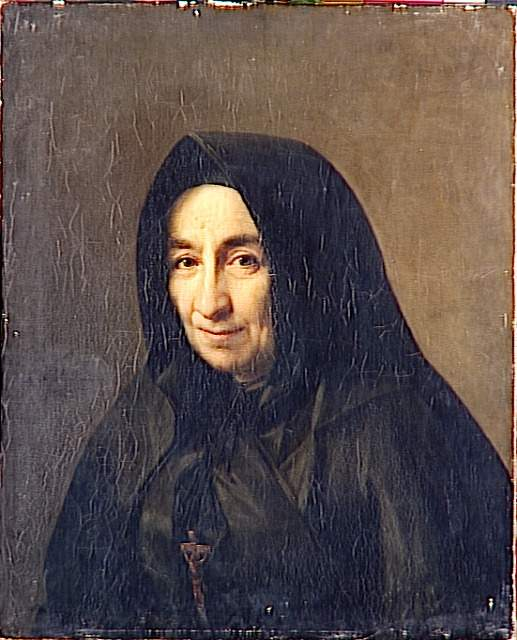
Madame de Fumel, 1816; possibly prize winner of the 1819 Paris Salon

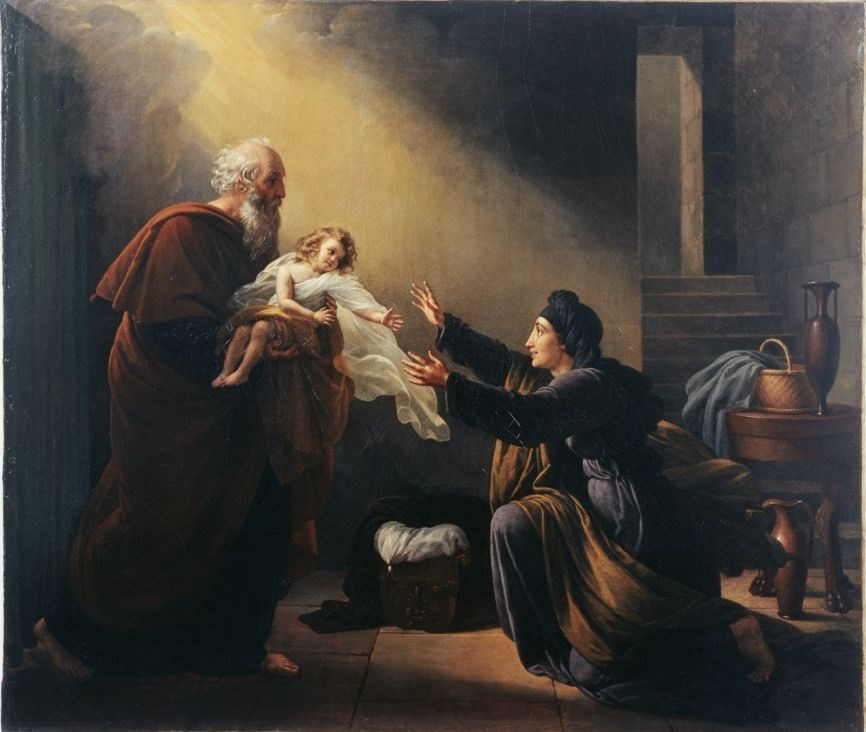
Elijah Resuscitating the Son of the Widow of Sarepta, 1819; possibly prize winner of the 1819 Paris Salon

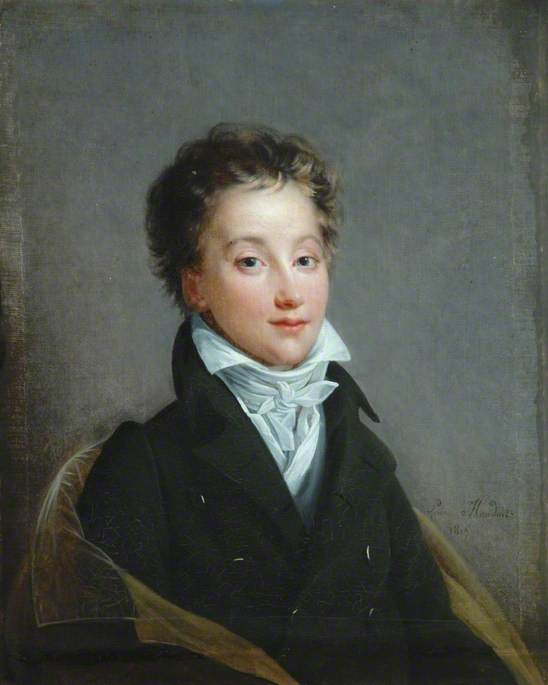
Portrait of a Boy in Green, 1819

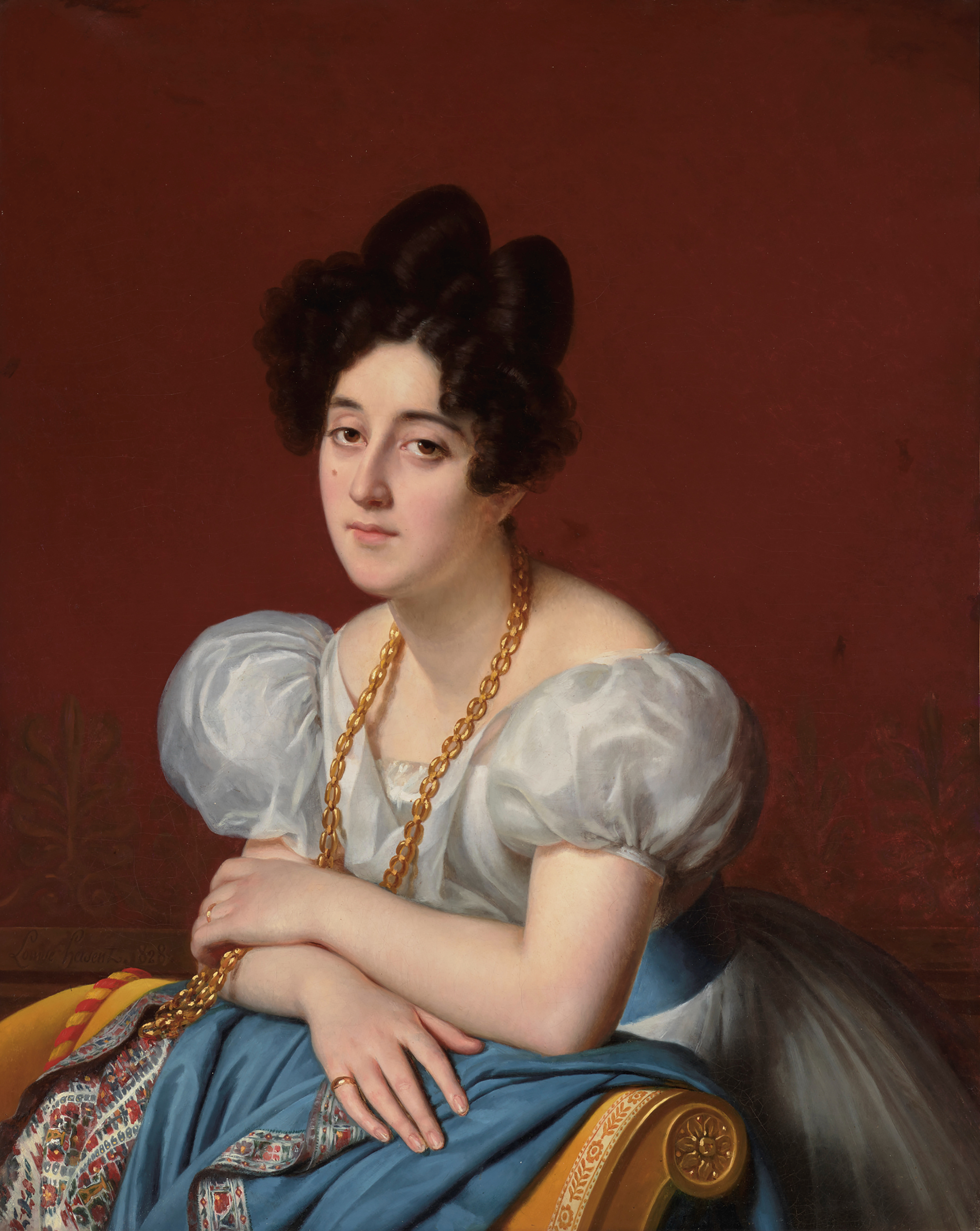
Portrait of a young woman leaning on a meridienne, 1828

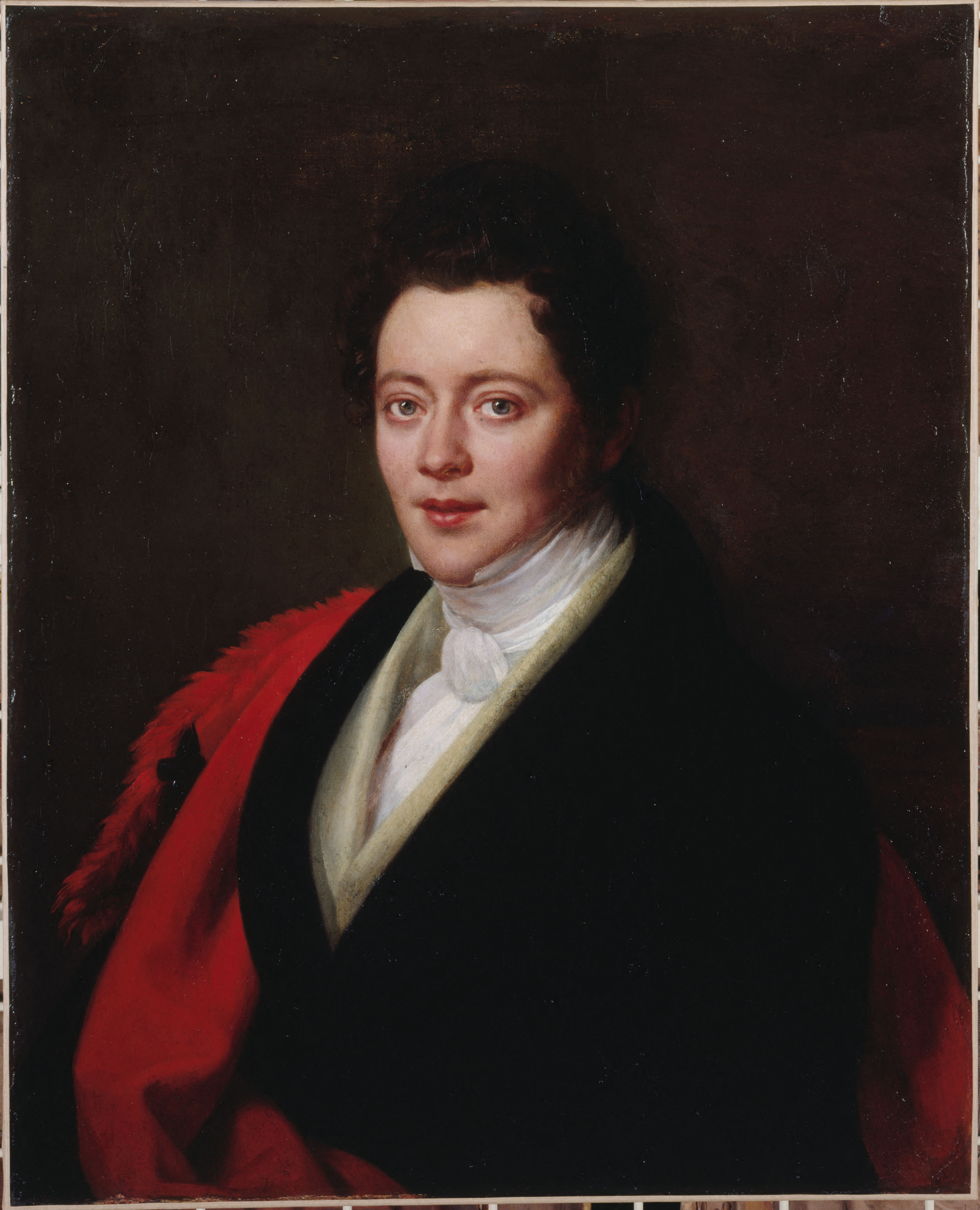
Portrait of Monsieur Arachequesne, 1830

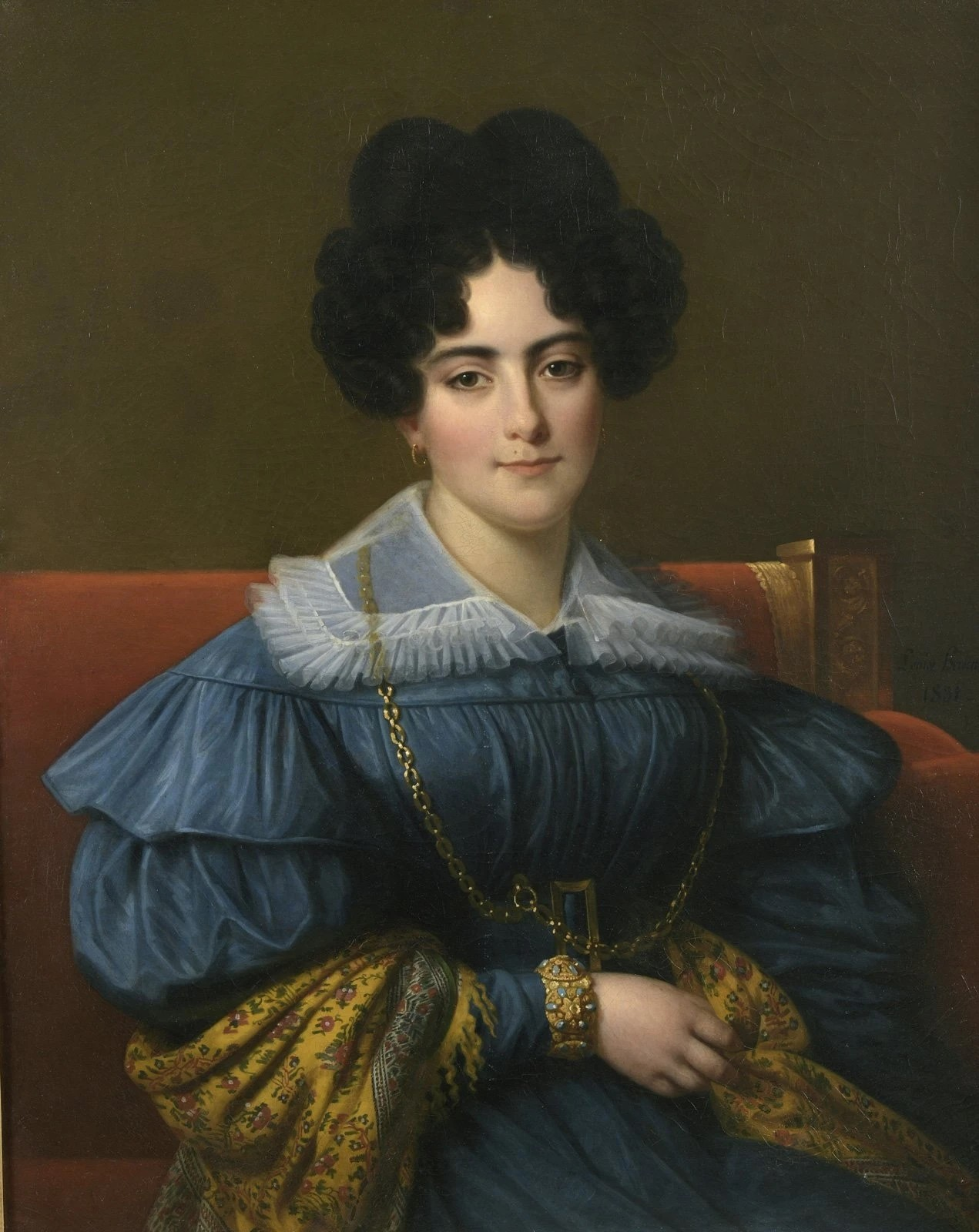
Woman in a blue dress, 1831

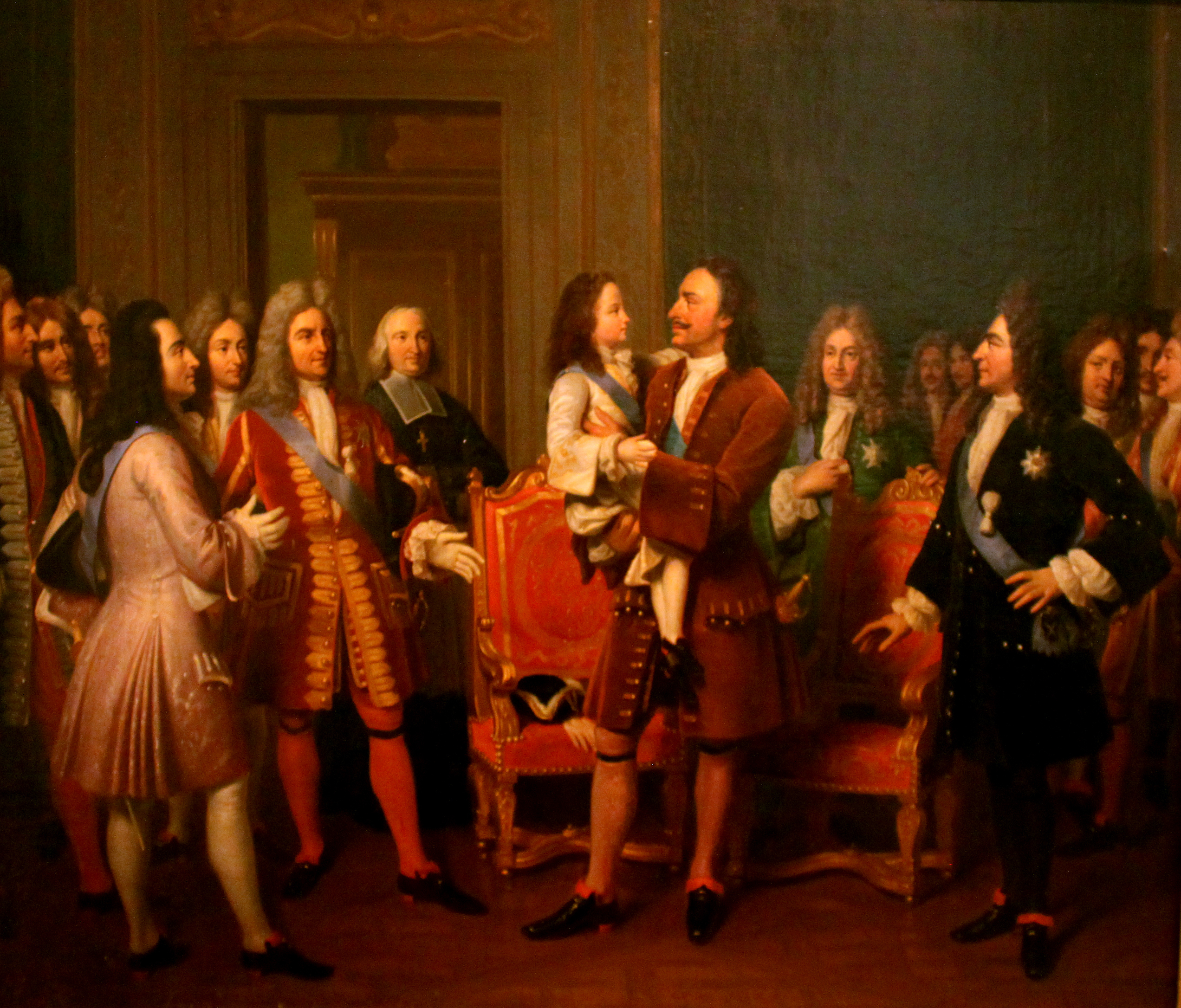
Peter I of Russia and Louis XV of France, (copy after Louise Hersent)
