= Salles des Croisades =

Rooms in Versailles dedicated to the Crusades

Coordinates: 48.8022°N 2.1183°E

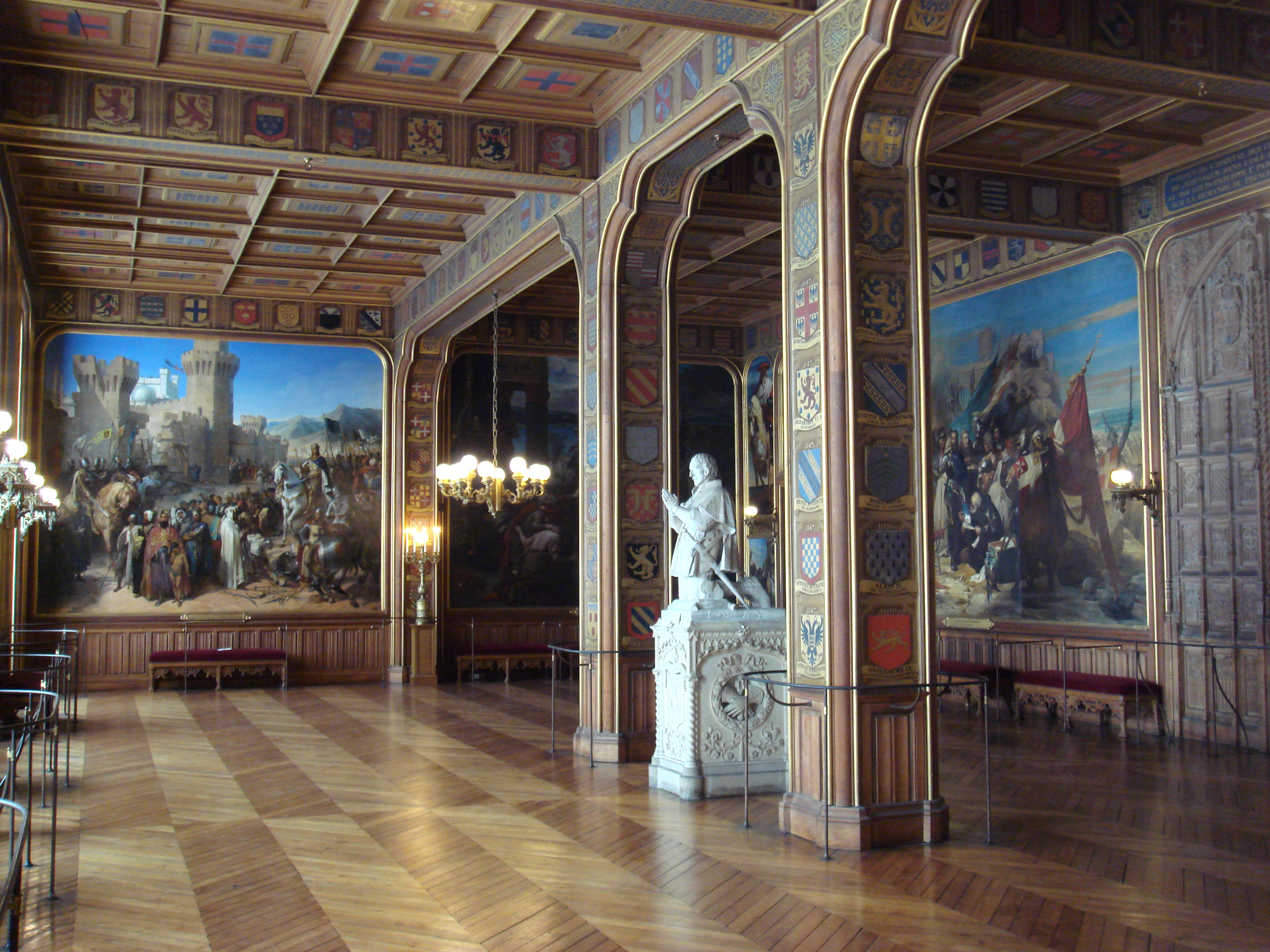
Salle des Croisades, Versailles.

The Salles des Croisades ("Hall of Crusades") is a set of rooms located in the north wing of the Palace of Versailles.

The rooms were created in the mid-19th century by King Louis-Philippe for his museum of French history, and opened in 1843, at a time when France was seized with enthusiasm with its historical past, and especially the Crusades period. The rooms are filled with over 120 paintings related to the Crusades. King Louis-Philippe included the names of the thousands of family whose ancestors went to the Crusades, encouraging many forgeries at that time.

== First room paintings ==
| Painting Title | Painter | Year Depicted (if applicable) |
|---|---|---|
| Philip Augustus takes the banner to Saint-Denis | Pierre Révoil | 24 June 1190 |
| Raising the siege of Salerno | Eugène Roger | 1016 |
| Battle of Civitella | Adolphe Roger | 18 June 1053 |
| Battle of Cerami | Prosper Lafaye | 1061 |
| Henry of Burgundy receives the royal investiture of Portugal | Claudes Jacquand | 1094 |
| Passage of the Bosphorus | Émile Signol | 1096 |
| Emperor Alexis Komnenos receives Peter the Hermit in Constantinople | Gillot Saint-Evre | 1096 |
| Adoption of Godfrey of Bouillon by Emperor Alexis I Komnenos | Alexandre Hesse | 1097 |
| Battle under the walls of Nicea | Henry Serrur | 1097 |
| Baldwin seizes the city of Edessa (Arrival of Baldwin, Count of Flanders, at Edessa) | Joseph-Nicolas Robert-Fleury | 1097 |
| The siege of Antioch by the Crusaders | Louis Gallait | 3 June 1098 |
| Battle under the walls of Antioch | Henri Frédéric Schopin | 28 June 1098 |
| Combat of Harim (Harene) | Oscar Gué | 9 February 1098 |
| Siege of Marrah | Henri Decaisne | 1098 |
| One-on-one combat of Robert, Duke of Normandy, with a Saracen warrior under the walls of Antioch | Jean-Joseph Dassy | 1098 |
| Siege of Albare | Édouard Pingret | September 1098 |
| Siege of Jerusalem | Émile Signol | 15 July 1099 |
| Godfrey of Bouillon is chosen as King of Jerusalem | Federico de Madrazo | 23 July 1099 |
| Bohemond I, Prince of Antioch | Merry-Joseph Blondel | |
| Roger I, Count of Sicily | Merry-Joseph Blondel | |
| Raymond IV, Count of Toulouse | Merry-Joseph Blondel | |
| Odo I, Duke of Burgundy | Merry-Joseph Blondel | |
| Robert Guiscart, Duke of Apulia and Calabria | Merry-Joseph Blondel | |

== Second room paintings ==
| Painting | Painter | Year Depicted (If applicable) |
|---|---|---|
| Godfrey of Bouillion hangs the trophies of Antioch on the Vaults of the Church of the Holy Sepulchre | François Marius Granet | August 1099 |
| Battle of Ascalon | Jean-Victor Schnetz | 12 August 1099 |
| Funeral of Godfrey of Bouilion | Édouard Cibot | 23 July 1100 |
| Siege (surrender) of Tripoli | Charles-Alexandre Debacq | 12 July 1109 |
| Battle of Jaffa | Henry Serrur | 27 May 1102 |
| Siege of Beirut | Eugene le Poittevin | 13 May 1110 |
| Raymond of Puy takes body of Turks as prisoners | ? | 1130 |
| Defense (victory) of northern (?) Syria by Raymond of Puy, grand master of the Knights Hospitallers | Édouard Cibot | 1130 |
| Preaching the Second Crusade in Vézelay in Burgundy | Émile Signol | 31 March 1146 |
| Knights Templars’ chapter held in Paris under the Grand Master, Robert of Burgundy | François Marius Granet | 1147 |
| Eleanor of Guyenne takes the cross with the women of the court | Franz Xaver Winterhalter | 1147 |
| Louis VII takes the oriflamme to Saint Denis | Jean-Baptiste Mauzaesse | 1147 |
| Surprise of the Camp of Nur ad-Din, Sultan of Aleppo | ? | 1150 |
| Allain Fergent, Duke of Brittany | Édouard Odier | |
| Josselin of Courtenay, Count of Edessa | Édouard Odier | |
| Baldwin II, King of Jerusalem | Édouard Odier | |
| Eustace III, Count of Boulogne | Édouard Odier | |
| Saint Louis Mediating Between the King of England and His Barons | Georges Rouget | 23 January 1264 |

== Third room paintings ==
| Painting | Painter | Year Depicted (If Applicable) |
|---|---|---|
| Preaching the first crusade to Clermont in Auvergne | Hendrik Scheffer | November 1095 |
| Tancred's Siege of Bethlehem | Pierre Révoil | 7 June 1099 |
| Procession of the Crusaders around Jerusalem, the day before the siege of the city, 14 July 1099 | Jean-Victor Schnetz | 14 July 1099 |
| Godfrey of Boullion holds the first Conference of the kingdom of Jerusalem | Pierre-Jules Jollivet | January 1100 |
| Institution of the Knights Hospitallers | Henri Decaisne | 15 February 1113 |
| Siege of Tyre by the crusaders | Alexandre-François Caminade | 7 July 1124 |
| Institution of the Knights Templars | François Marius Granet | 1123 |
| Pope Eugenius receives the ambassadors of Baldwin III, King of Jerusalem | Hortense Haudebourt-Lescot | 1145 |
| Siege of Lisbon by the crusaders | Augustus Desmoulins | 24 October 1147 |
| Louis VII defends himself against seven Saracens | Antoine-Félix Boisselier | January 1148 |
| Louis VII, Emperor Conrad, and Baldwin III, deliberate at Ptolemais (Acre) on the conduct of the holy war | Charles-Alexandre Debacq | 1191 |
| Siege of Ascalon | Sébastien Cornu | 19 August 1153 |
| Battle of Putaha | Éloi Firmin Féron | 1159 |
| Combat near Nazareth | ? | 1 May 1187 |
| Ptolemais (Acre) returns to King Philip Augustus and King Richard the Lionheart | Merry-Joseph Blondel | 12 July 1191 |
| Margaret of France, Queen of Hungary, leads the Hungarians to the crusade | Édouard Pingret | 1196 |
| Siege of Constantinople by the crusaders | Eugène Delacroix | 1204 |
| Siege of Damietta by John of Brienne | Henri Delaborde | 5 November 1219 |
| Raising of the siege of Rhodes | Édouard Odier | 17 August 1480 |
| Entrance of the Knights Hospitallers into Viterbo | Augustus Debay | 1527 |
| The Knights Hospitallers take possession of the island of Malta | René Théodore Berthon | 26 October 1530 |
| Raising the siege of Malta | Charles-Philippe Larivière | September 1565 |
| Pierre of Aubusson, master of the Knights Hospitallers | Édouard Odier | |
| John, Lord of Joinville | Merry-Joseph Blondel | |
| Charles of France, Count of Anjou | Henri Decaisne | |
| Phillip of Villiers of l'Isle-adam, Grand Master of the Knights Hospitallers | Gillot Saint-Evre | |
| Jacques de Molay, Grand Master of the Knights Templars | Eugène Emmanuel Amaury Duval | |
| Louis IX, King of France | Émile Signol | |
| Robert of France, Count of Artois | Henri Decaisne | |
| Alphonse of France, Count of Pointers | Henri Decaisne | |
| Richard the Lionheart, King of England | Merry-Joseph Blondel | |
| Saint Bernard of Clairvaux | Leon de Lestang-Parade | |
| Philip Augustus, King of France | Emile Signol | |
| Albéric Clément, Marshal of May | Henri Decaisne | |
| Foulques de Villaret, Grand Master of the Knights Hospitallers | Eugène Goyet | 1305-1319 |
| Raymond of Puy, Grand Master of the Knights Hospitaller | Alexandre Laemlein | |
| Louis VII, King of France | Émile Signol | |
| Henry I, Count of Champagne | Henri Decaisne | |
| Hugh of Payens, Grand Master of the Knights Templars | Henri Lehmann | |
| Baldwin I, King of Jerusalem | Merry-Joseph Blondel | |
| Godfrey of Bouillon | ? | |
| Robert II of Flanders, the Jerusalemite | Henri Decaisne | |
| Robert III Curthose of Normandy | Henri Decaisne | |
| Tancred, prince of Tiberias | Merry-Joseph Blondel | |
| Battle of Las Navas de Tolosa between the Spanish and the Moors | Horace Vernet | 16 July 1212 |
| Peter the Hermit | Léon de Lestang-Parade | |
| Hugh of France, Count of Vermandois | Henri Decaisne | |
| Adhemar of Monteil, Bishop of Puy | Merry-Joseph Blondel | |
| John Parisot of La Valette, Grand Master of the Knights Hospitallers | Charles-Philippe Larivière | |

== Fourth room paintings ==
| Painting | Painter | Year Depicted (If Applicable) |
|---|---|---|
| Reception of John of Brienne in Ptolemais | ? | 13 September 1210 |
| Landing of Saint Louis in Egypt | Georges Rouget | 5 June 1249 |
| Saint Louis receives the patriarch of Jerusalem in Damietta | Oscar Gué | 1249 |
| Gaucher of Châtillon defends the only entrance of a street in the neighborhood of Munyat Abû Abdallah | Karl Girardet | 6 April 1250 |
| William of Clermont defends Ptolemais | Dominique Papety | May 1291 |
| Siege of Rhodes by the Knights Hospitallers | Éloi Firmin Féron | 13 August 1310 |
| Defense of Rhodes against the Ottoman Sultan | Gustaf Wappers | 1315 |
| Naval battle won by the Knights Hospitallers; siege of the island of Episkopi (Tilos) by the Ottoman Turks | Augustus Mayer | 1323 |
| Siege of Smyrna by the Knights of Rhodes | Charles-Alexandre Debacq | 28 October 1344 |
| Naval battle of Embro (Imbros) won by the Knights Hospitallers | Eugène Lepoittevin | 1347 |
| The Knights Hospitallers reestablish religion in Armenia | Henri Delaborde | 1347 |
| Siege of the Citadel of Jaffa | Édouard Girardet | 31 July 1191 |
| The Marshal of Boucicault defends Constantinople against the sultan Bajezet | Jean-Pierre Granger | 1402 |
| Chapter of the Knights Hospitaller, convened at Rhodes by the Grand Master Fabrizio del Carretto to deliberate over the defense of the island against the Turks | Claudius Jacquand | 1514 |
| Boucicault, known as John of Meingre, Marshal of France | Alexandre Laemlein | |
| Philip III, called the Adventurous, King of France | Alexandre Laemlein | |
| John Bonpar of Lastic, Grand Master of the Order of the Knights of Rhodes | Alexandre Genet | |

== Fifth room paintings ==
| Painting | Painter | Year Depicted (If Applicable) |
|---|---|---|
| Battle of Ascalon (Battle of Mongisard, near Ascalon) | Philip larivière | 25 November 1177 |
| Interview of Philip Augustus and Henry II at Gisors | Gillot Saint-Evre | 21 January 1188 |
| Battle of Arsuf 1191 | Éloi Firmin Féron | 7 September 1191 |
| Defeat of Malek-Adel between Tyre and Sidon | ? | 1197 |
| Siege of Beirut by Amaury II | Alexandre Hesse | 24 October 1197 |
| Baldwin, Count of Flanders, crowned Emperor of Constantinople | Louis Gallait | 6 May 1204 |
| The Assembly of crusaders in the church of Saint Mark (Geoffrey of Villehardouin asks Venice for vessels to transport the Crusaders to Palestine) | Charles-Caïus Renoux | 1201 |
| Boniface of Montfort chosen as leader of the Fourth Crusade | Pierre-Antoine Labouchère | 1201 |
| Andrew, King of Hungary, becomes an associate of the Knights Hospitallers | | 1208 |
| Conrad of Montferrat, King of Jerusalem | François-Édouard Picot | |
| John of Brienne, Emperor of Constantinople | François-Édouard Picot | |
| Guy of Lusignan, King of Jerusalem | François-Édouard Picot | |
| Baldwin I, Emperor of Constantinople | François-Édouard Picot | |
| Frederick Barbarossa, Holy Roman Emperor | François-Édouard Picot | |

== Gallery ==
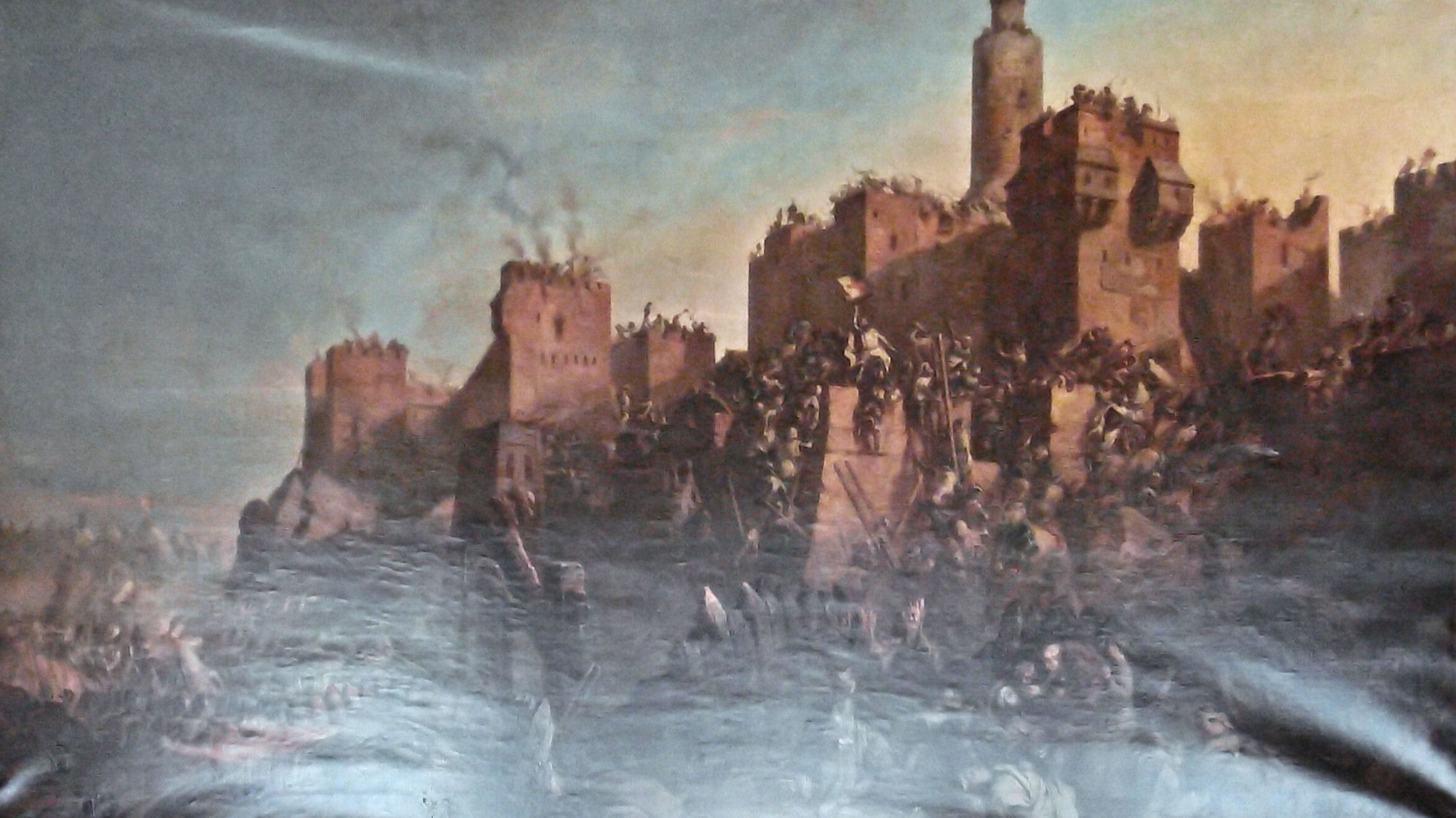
Jacques de Molay, Grand Maître de l'Ordre du Temple, prend Jerusalem (1099) by Claudius Jacquand

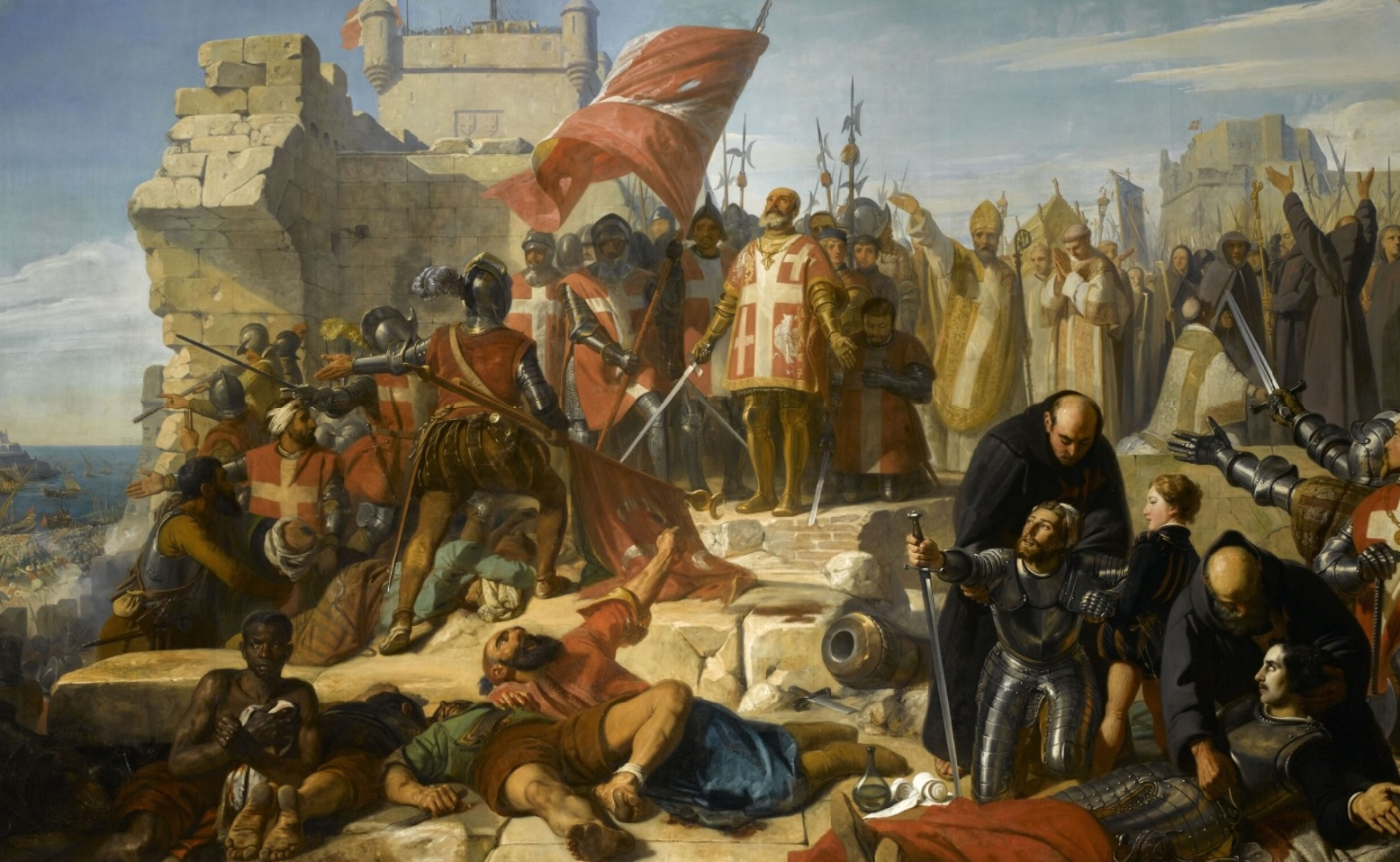
Levée du Siège de Malte by Charles-Philippe Larivière

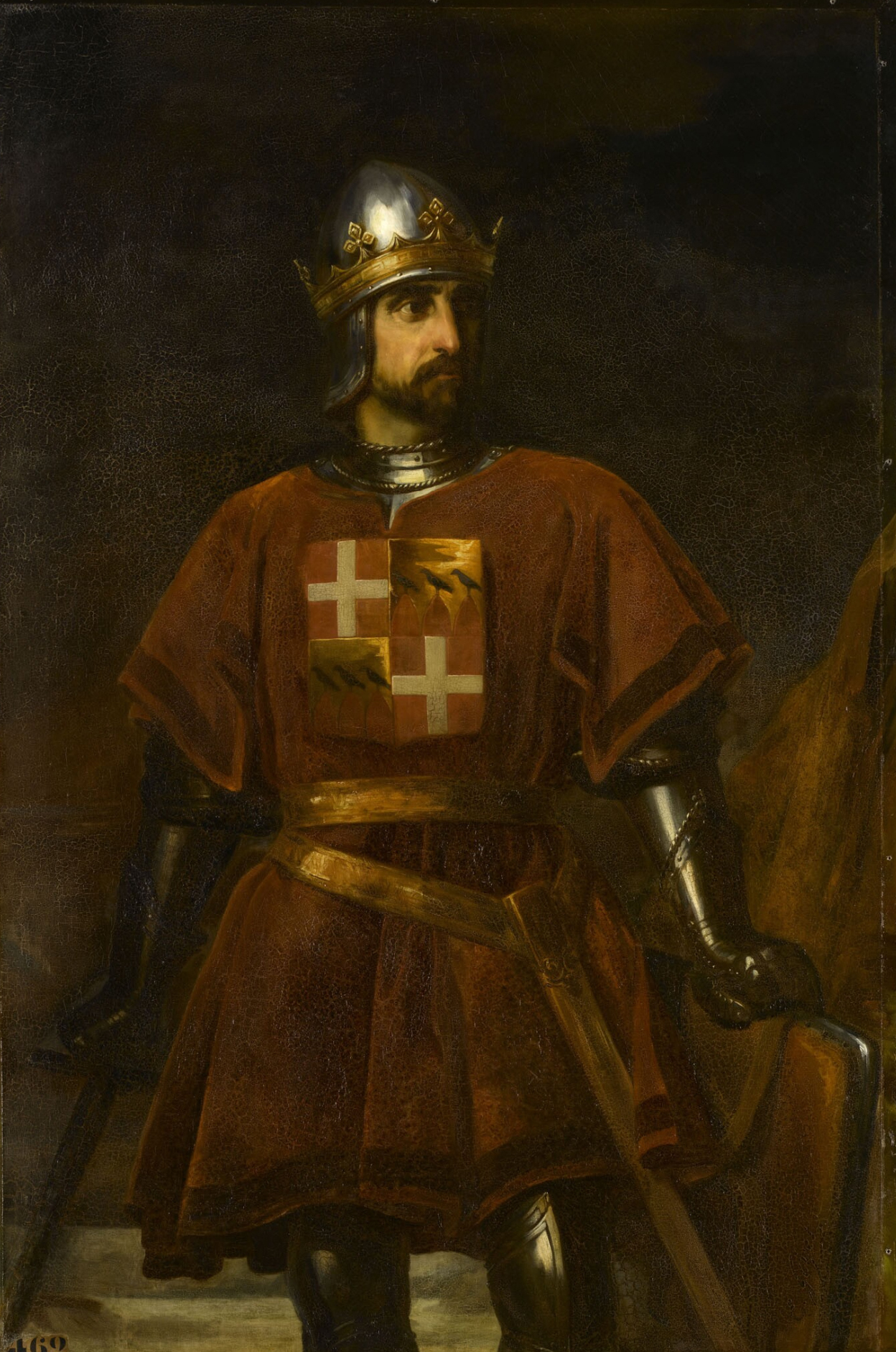
Foulques de Villaret, grand maître des hospitaliers de Saint-Jean de Jérusalem de 1307 à 1327, c. 1841, by Eugène Goyet

== See also ==
- Musée de l'Histoire de France (Versailles)
