= Labouchère (surname) =

Labouchère is a surname, and may refer to:

- François de Labouchère (1917–1942), French pilot of World War II
- George Labouchère (1905–1999), British diplomat
- Henry Labouchère (1831–1912), English politician, writer, publisher and theatre owner
- Pierre-Antoine Labouchère (1807–1873) was a French historical painter

== See also ==
- Labouchere (disambiguation)
