= Labouchere =

Labouchere or Labouchère may refer to:

- Labouchere (paddle steamer)
- François de Labouchère (1917–1942), French aviator
- Henry Labouchere, 1st Baron Taunton (1798–1869), British politician
- Henry Labouchère (1831–1912), British politician
- Labouchère system, gambling strategy
- Labouchere Amendment, British law

== See also ==
- Labouchère (surname)
