= Battle of Butaiha =

Battle fought between Zengids and Kingdom of Jerusalem

- Part of the Crusades
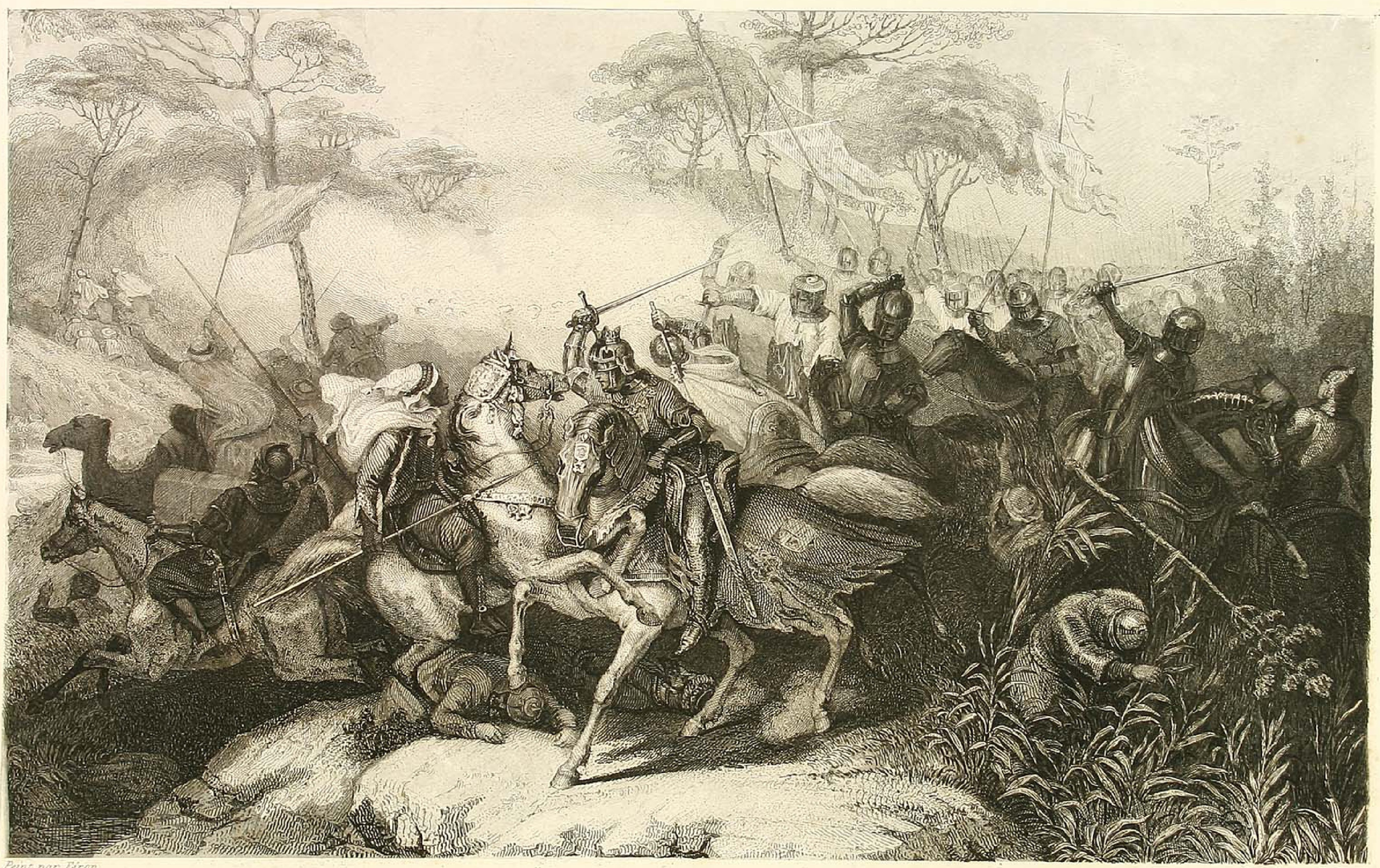
- Battle of Putaha (engraving by E. Lechard, c. 1838, original painting by Éloi Firmin Féron)
| Date | 15 July 1158 |
| Location | Near of Butaiha village, northeast of Lake Tiberias, modern-day Israel |
| Result | Crusaders victory |

Belligerents
| Kingdom of Jerusalem; Knights Hospitaller | Zengids |

Commanders and leaders
| Baldwin III of Jerusalem; Thierry, Count of Flanders | Nur ad-Din Zangi |

Strength
| Unknown | Unknown |

Casualties and losses
| Unknown | Unknown but serious |

In the Battle of Butaiha (or the Battle of Putaha) in July 1158, a Crusader army led by King Baldwin III of Jerusalem won a victory against the forces of Nur ad-Din Zengi, the emir of Aleppo and Damascus on the plains of Butaiha located in the northeast part of modern-day Israel. At the time of the battle, the area belonged to the Kingdom of Jerusalem.

== Background ==
In 1154, Nur ad-Din achieved his goal of seizing Damascus and welding Syria into a Zengid empire. Instead of confronting a group of Muslim emirates and being able to play them off against one another, the Crusader states (Kingdom of Jerusalem, County of Tripoli and Principality of Antioch) faced a unified threat to their existence.

Each year, the Damascenes pastured large flocks in the area of Banias on the Franks' territory, whose permission they had secured. In February 1157, Baldwin unwisely attacked them, seizing the animals to pay his kingdom's debts. This act of aggression violated a truce. Infuriated, Nur ad-Din immediately began launching raids on the Franks in the vicinity and, in the battle of Lake Huleh in June 1157, defeated the Crusaders' army.

== Battle ==
The next larger clash of the war occurred on 15 July 1158 on the plains near the village of Butaiha, northeast of Lake Tiberias. An army led by Baldwin and Thiery of Alsace, Count of Flanders, defeated the forces of Nur ad-Din during their raid on the border within the Zengid territory. The Knights Hospitallers also present in the battle, as the defenders of the Lordship of Oultrejordain. Medieval sources claim that around six thousand Muslim warriors had fallen, but this estimate is probably exaggerated. The decisive victory of Baldwin was also celebrated as one of the most important military successes of Christian forces since the Siege of Jerusalem in 1099.

== Aftermath ==
Numerous fights followed in the next years. In 1160 or 1161, Raynald of Châtillon was captured and held in captivity until 1176. Both sides then clashed again on a larger scale during the Battle of al-Buqaia in 1163, which was victorious for the Crusaders.

== In art ==
Event is pictured on the large-scale painting by French artist Éloi Firmin Féron (1802–1876), named The Battle of Putaha on July 15, 1159, between King Baldwin III of Jerusalem and Emir Nur ad-Din, while incorrectly dated to the year after. The work is exhibited in the Salle des Croisades in the Palace of Versailles.
