= Battle of Lake Huleh =

Battle of Lake Huleh may refer to:

- Battle of Lake Huleh (1157) between the Kingdom of Jerusalem and the Zengids
- Battle of Lake Huleh (1771) between the Ottomans and Palestinian rebels
