= Jean-Joseph Dassy =

French painter

Jean-Joseph Dassy (27 December 1791 – 27 July 1865) was a French historical and portrait painter, and lithographer. He studied under Girodet-Trioson, and commenced exhibiting at the Salon of 1819. There are several pictures by him at Versailles, among which are 'The Battle of Saucourt' and 'Charibert.'

== Biography ==
Jean-Joseph Dassy was born and died in Marseille. His father was a mason. His younger brother Louis-Toussaint Dassy was destined for the priesthood while his other two younger brothers, Pierre and Hippolyte, helped their father in his marble workshop. Three of his sisters were nuns.

Initially a student of Goubaud and Aubert at the École des Beaux-Arts in Marseille, he then went to Paris where, in 1817, he became one of the best students of Girodet-Trioson.

== Works ==
=== Historical scenes ===
Historical scenes of Jean-Joseph Dassy

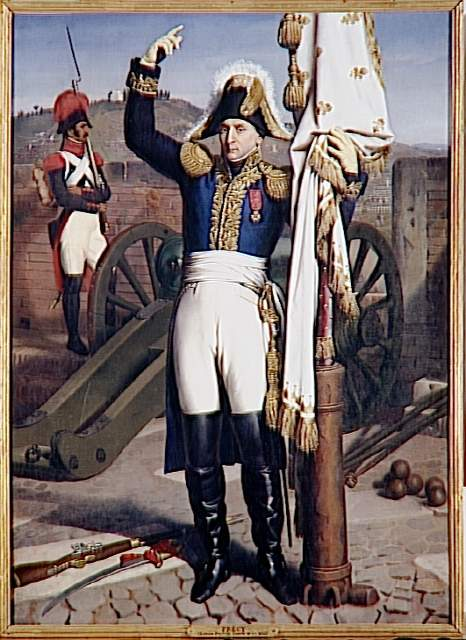
Louis François Perrin, Earl of Précy (1742-1820), General at Vendée, 1827

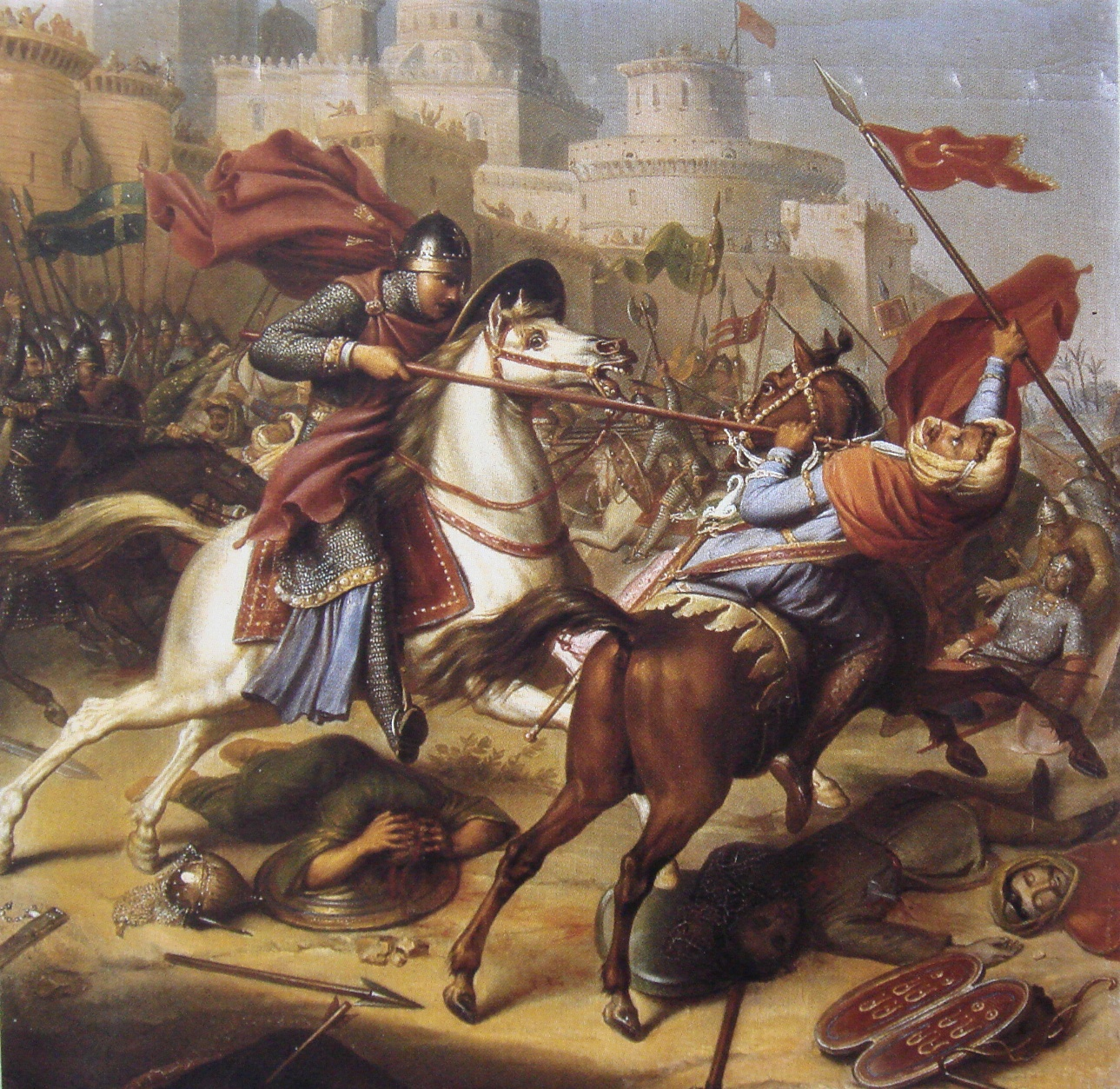
Robert Curthose, Duke of Normandy, at the Siege of Antioch, 1850

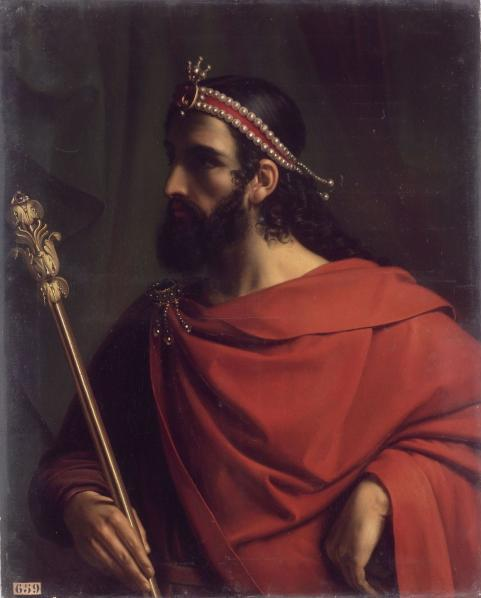
Caribert, Frankish king of Paris and western Gaul (died in 567), 1837

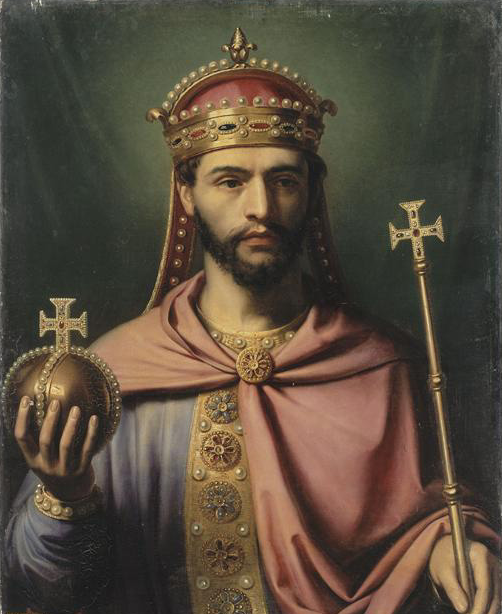
Louis I the Pious (778-840), Emperor of the West, 1837

==== Museum of Art and History of Cholet ====
- General Précy, 1829, deposit of the National Museum of the Castles of Versailles and Trianon, 1914.

==== Hall of the Crusades, Versailles ====
- Combat of Robert, Duke of Normandy, with a Saracen Warrior

==== National Museum of the Castles of Versailles and Trianon ====
- Caribert, Frankish King of Paris and Western Gaul (died in 567)
- Louis I the Pious (778-840), Emperor of the West

=== Religious scenes ===
Religious scenes of Jean-Joseph Dassy

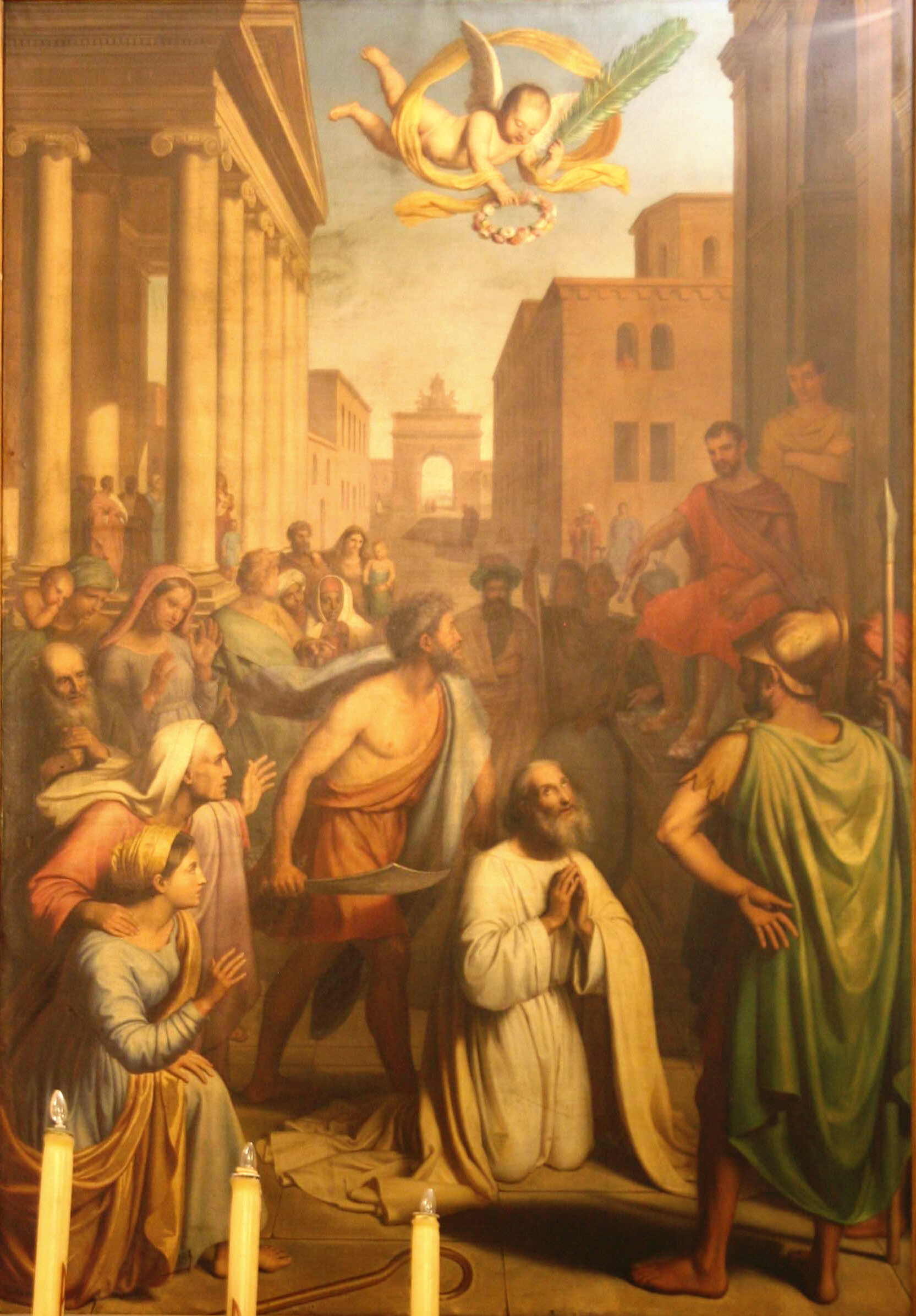
Martyrdom of St. Lazarus (St. Lazarus Church, Marseille)

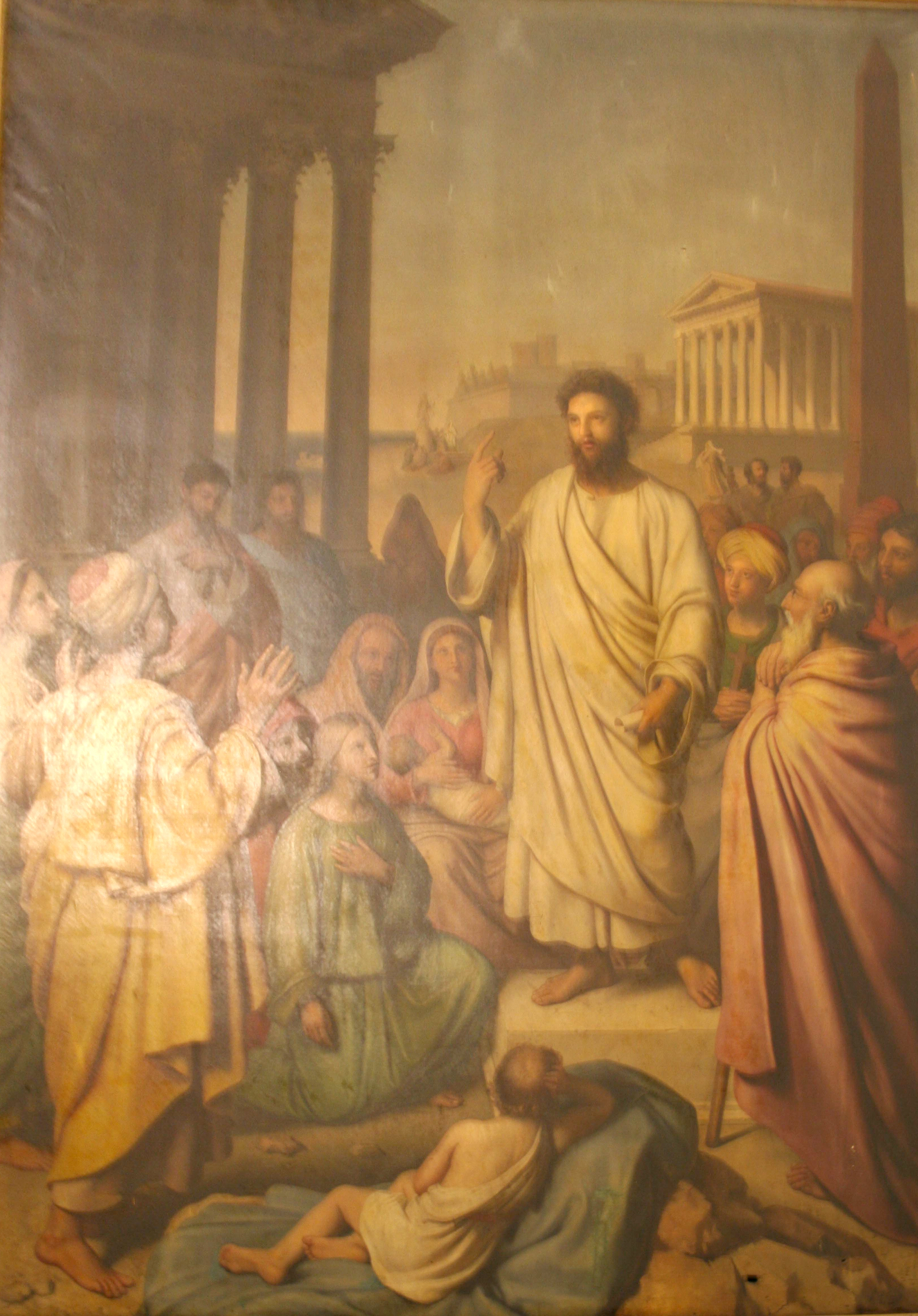
Apostolate of St. Lazarus (St. Lazarus Church, Marseille)

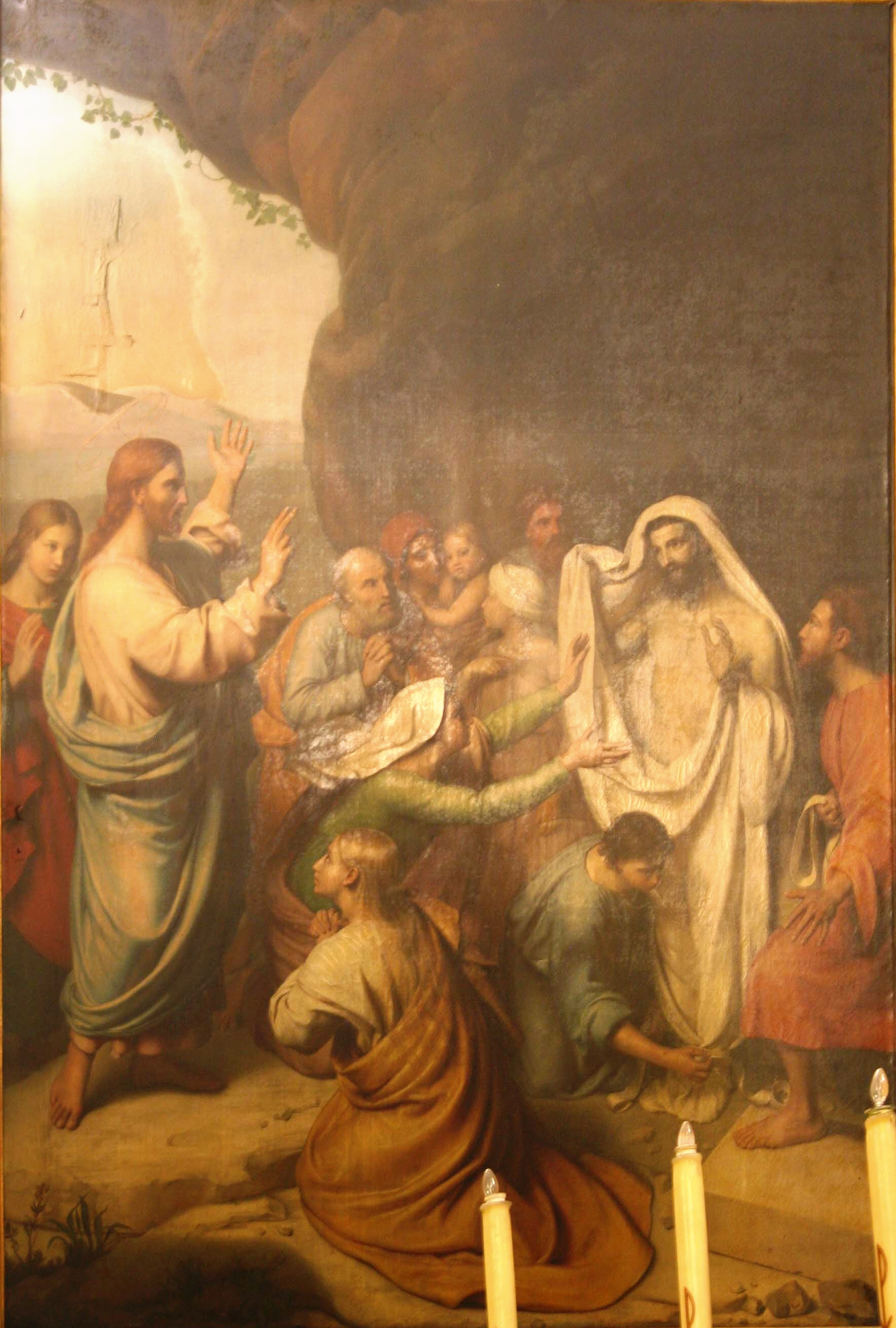
Resurrection of St. Lazarus (St. Lazarus Church, Marseille)
