= The Duke of Orleans Leaving the Palais-Royal =

Painting by Horace Vernet

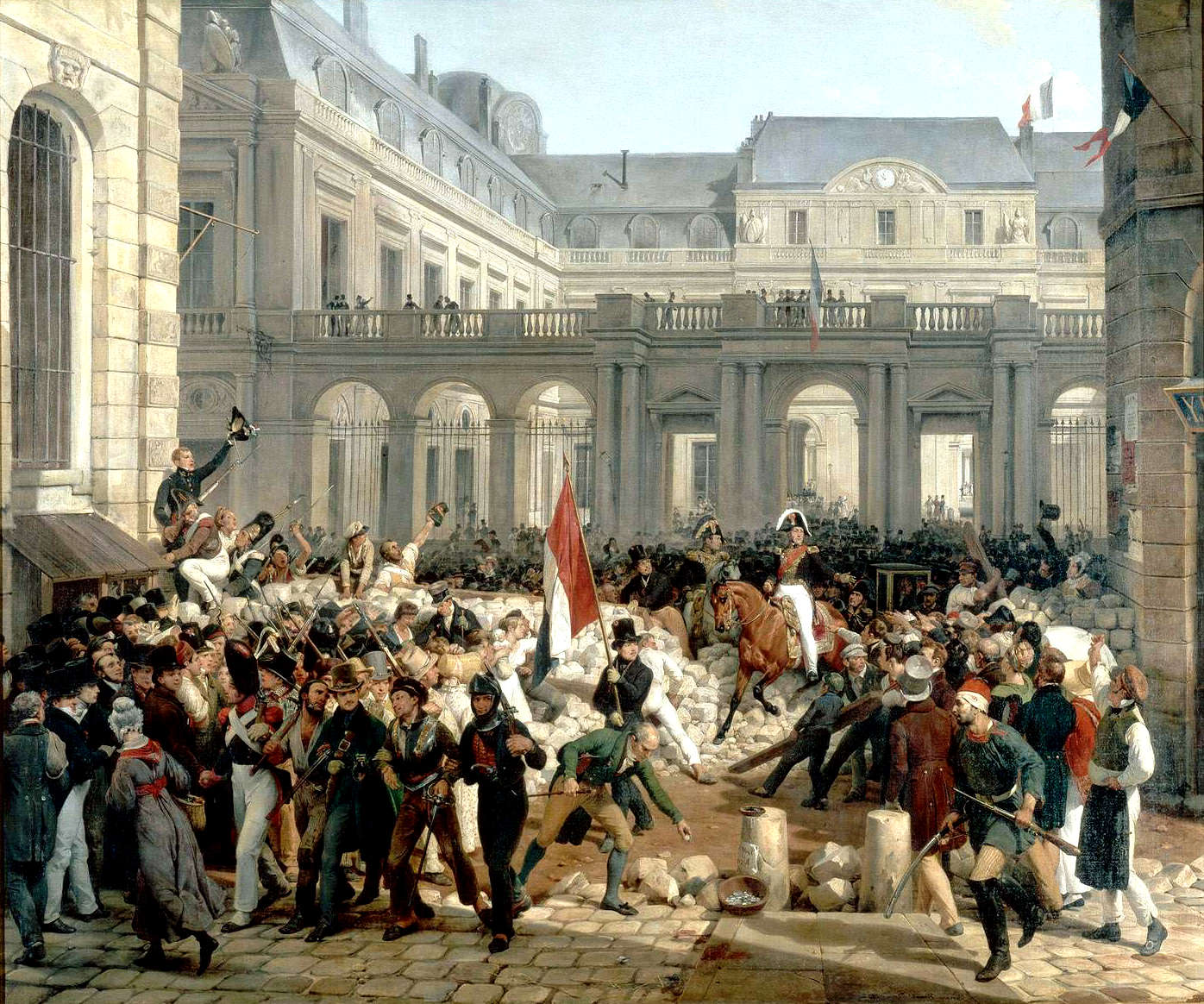
- Artist: Horace Vernet
- Year: 1832
- Type: Oil on canvas, history painting
- Dimensions: 215 cm × 261.5 cm (85 in × 103.0 in)
- Location: Palace of Versailles; Versailles

The Duke of Orleans Leaving the Palais-Royal (French: Le duc d'Orléans quitte le Palais-Royal, pour se rendre à l'Hôtel de ville. 31 juillet 1830) is an 1832 history painting by the French artist Horace Vernet. It depicts a scene from the July Revolution of 1830. On 31 July, the Duke of Orleans is shown riding out from his Paris residence Palais-Royal to head to the City Hall. After Charles X was compelled to abdicate, his cousin Orleans was proclaimed as Louis Philippe I beginning the July Monarchy.

Vernet was a noted depictor of Romantic portrayals of recent French history. The painting was commissioned by Louis Phillipe for 10,000 francs. The picture was displayed at the Salon of 1833 held at the Louvre, one of a number of works depicting the events of 1830. Today it is in the collection of the Museum of French History at the Palace of Versailles.

== See also ==
- The Arrival of the Duke of Orleans at the Hôtel de Ville, an 1837 painting by Charles-Philippe Larivière

== Bibliography ==
- Marriman, Michael. Romantic Paris: Histories of a Cultural Landscape, 1800–1850. Stanford University Press, 2009.
- Price, Munro. The Perilous Crown: France Between Revolutions, 1814–1848. Pan Macmillan, 2010.
