= Eugène Roger =

French painter

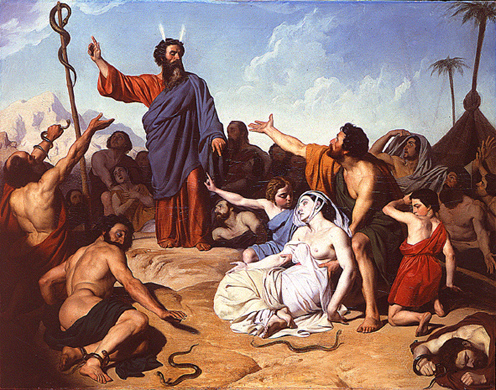
Moses and the Serpent of Brass

Eugène Roger (26 May 1807, Sens – 30 July 1840, Paris) was a French painter in the Romantic style who specialized in historical and Biblical scenes.

== Biography ==
He was the son of a tax collector from Bourges. He initially studied at the Collège Royal and received his first lessons in drawing from Henri-Joseph Boichard (1783–1850). In 1826, he enrolled at the École nationale supérieure des Beaux-Arts, on the recommendation Louis Hersent, whose student he became. Later, he studied with Antoine-Jean Gros and, in 1832, with Jean-Auguste-Dominique Ingres. He entered the competition for the Prix de Rome six times between 1828 and 1833, when he finally won the prize for his rendering of Moses and the serpent of brass.

He lived at the Villa Médicis between 1834 and 1838, sending home paintings to be exhibited at the Salon on a regular basis. He held numerous showings there from 1831 until his untimely death. In 1833, his "Body of Charles the Bold" received official recognition from the Académie des Beaux-Arts and his final known work, featuring John the Baptist preaching, was acquired by the French government for 4000 Francs and installed at the Musée du Berry.

In 1838, he contracted an unspecified "chest disease" that required him to leave Rome. Nevertheless, upon returning home he accepted several commissions from the galleries at Versailles: a Charlemagne crossing the Alps brought him 600 Francs that year, and a depiction of the lifting of the Siege of Salerno (1016) provided 1500 Francs in 1839 from King Louis-Philippe. The painting was to be placed in the Hall of the Crusades; a new museum being planned by the King.

His health became increasingly fragile during this time and he died in 1840, aged only thirty-three.

== Sources ==
- Marie-Madeleine Aubrun, "Eugène Roger à Hippolyte Flandrin à travers leurs relations épistolaires, la vie d'un pensionnaire de la Villa Médicis", in Archives de l'Art français, nouvelle période, 1986.
