= The Arrival of the Duke of Orleans at the Hôtel de Ville =

Painting by Charles-Philippe Larivière

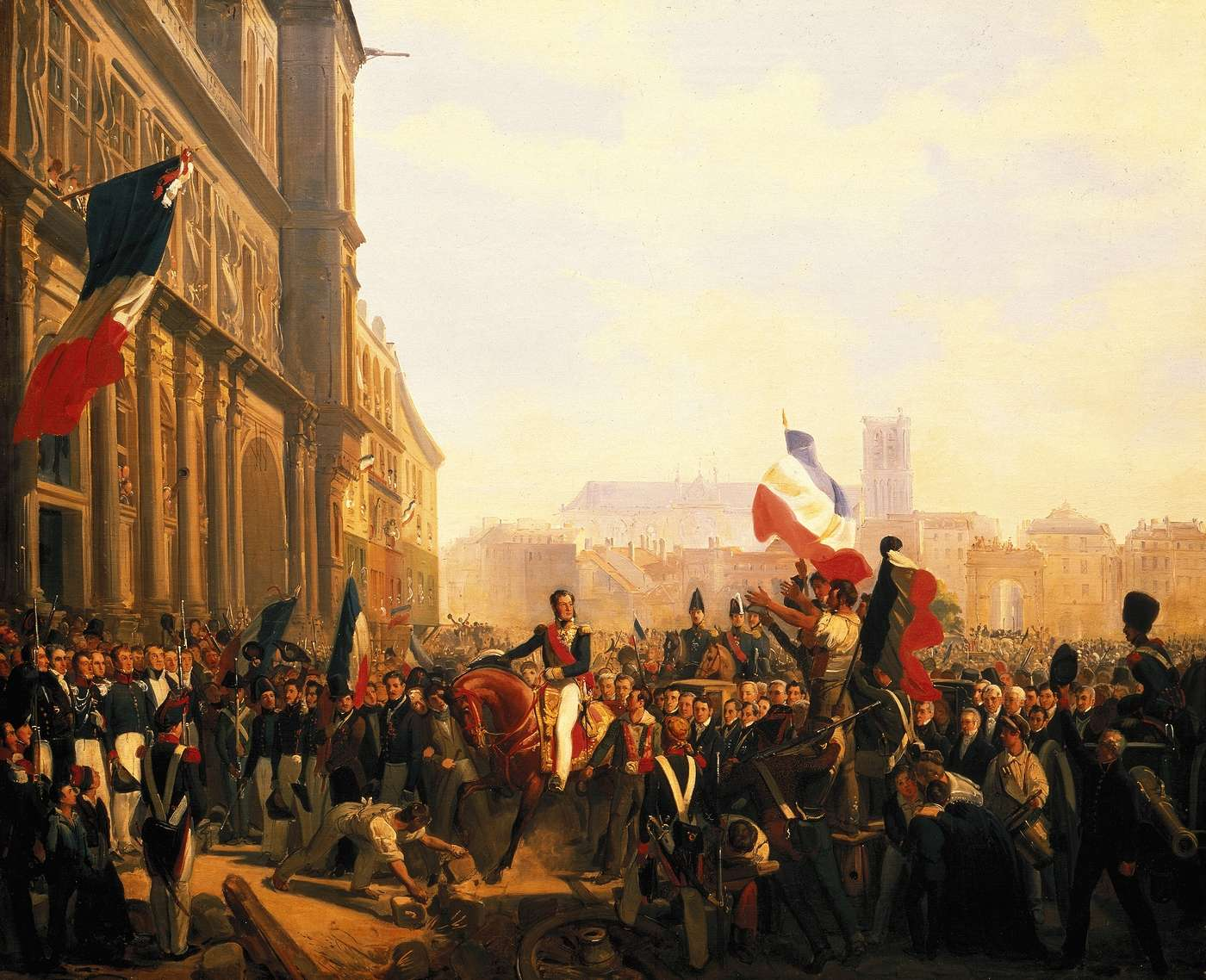
- 1837 version by Éloi Firmin Féron
- Artist: Charles-Philippe Larivière
- Year: 1836
- Type: Oil on canvas, history painting
- Dimensions: 122 cm × 149 cm (48 in × 59 in)
- Location: Hôtel de Ville; Paris

The Arrival of the Duke of Orleans at the Hôtel de Ville (French: Louis-Philippe, Duc d'Orléans, nommé lieutenant général du Royaume, arrive à l'Hôtel de Ville de Paris) is an 1836 history painting by the French artist Charles-Philippe Larivière. Portraying the events of the July Revolution on 31 July 1830, it depicts the Duke of Orleans arriving at the Hôtel de Ville, the city hall of Paris to the acclaim of the city's crowds. Charles X, a cousin of Orleans, was overthrown and he and his direct heirs were driven into exile. Orleans became King of the French, and head of a constitutional monarchy. He reigned for eighteen years before himself being overthrown in the French Revolution of 1848.

Louis Philippe commissioned the work to hang in the city hall as a commemoration of the events. The National Guard, supporters of his, feature prominently in the painting. It was exhibited at the Salon of 1836. Today, it remains in the collection of the Hôtel de Ville. A reproduction was produced by Éloi Firmin Féron.

== See also ==
- The Duke of Orleans Leaving the Palais-Royal, an 1832 painting by Horace Vernet

== Bibliography ==
- Brown, Marilyn R. The Gamin de Paris in Nineteenth-Century Visual Culture: Delacroix, Hugo, and the French Social Imaginary. Taylor & Francis, 2017.
- Fortescue, William. France and 1848: The End of Monarchy. Psychology Press, 2005.
