= Émile Signol =

French artist (1804–1892)

Émile Signol (March 11, 1804 – October 4, 1892) was a French artist who painted history paintings, portraits, and genre works. Although he lived during the Romantic period, he espoused an austere neoclassicism and was hostile to Romanticism.

== Biography ==
Signol was born in Paris. He studied under Blondel and Gros. He made his Salon debut at the Salon of 1824 with a painting of Joseph Recounting His Dream to His Brothers. He painted a portrait of Hector Berlioz at the Académie de France à Rome, Villa Medici, during the composer's stay upon his winning the Grand Prix de Rome in 1830. Signol had won the grand prize for the same competition's painting category with Titulus Crucis.

In 1842 he painted The Death of Saphira for the Church of the Madeleine, and was subsequently commissioned to decorate the churches of Saint Roch, Saint Sévérin, Saint Eustace, and Saint Augustin. Four of his paintings are housed at the Saint-Sulpice church in Paris.

He was made a Knight of the Legion of Honor in 1841, and an Officer in 1865.

Elected in 1860, he held a first seat position at the Académie des Beaux-Arts in Paris. In 1862, Pierre-Auguste Renoir studied under Signol and Charles Gleyre across from the École du Louvre at the École des Beaux-Arts. Signol and Gleyre taught Jean-Jules-Antoine Lecomte du Nouÿ in 1861.

Signol died in Montmorency, Val-d'Oise in 1892.

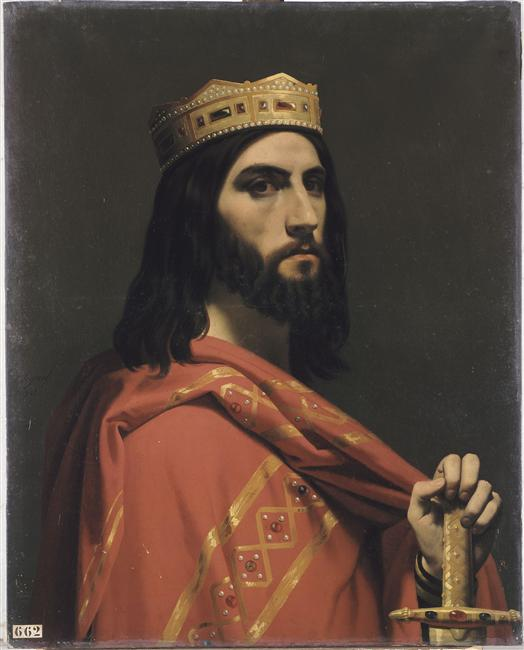
Émile Signol, Dagobert I, king of Austrasia, Neustria and Burgundy, oil on canvas, 1842, 90 × 72 cm. Musée National des châteaux de Versailles et de Trianon

== Selected works ==
- The Abduction of Psyche
- Réveil du Juste, Réveil du Méchant Angers (Musée des Beaux-Arts d'Angers)
- Godfrey of Bouillon
- La Théologié
- Titulus Crucis
- Portrait of Berlioz (1832)
- Saint Bernard preaching the Second Crusade before King Louis VII, his queen Eleanor of Aquitaine, and Abbot Suger, at Vézelay in Burgundy, March 31, 1146 (1840)
- Le Christ et la femme adultère (1840)
- Dagobert I (1842; Museo Nazionale del Castello e di Trianons, Versailles)
- Prise de Jérusalem par les Croisés, 15 Juillet 1099 (1847) (Siege of Jerusalem (1099))
- The Trial Of Calumny
- Apotre Guerissant Un Malade Par L'Imposition Des Mains
