= Alexandre Hesse =

French painter

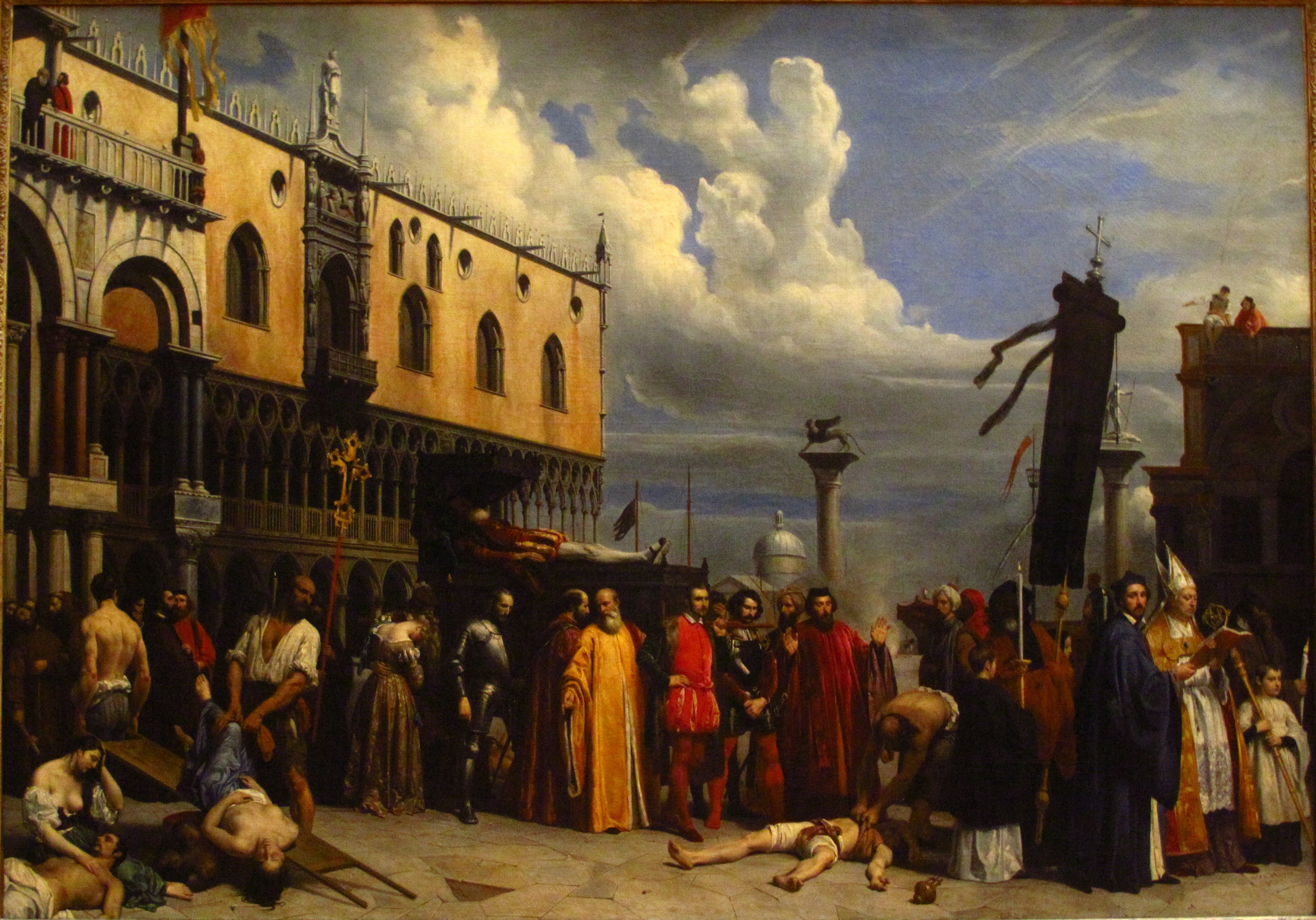
Death of Titian from the plague, 1832, Louvre Museum

Alexandre Jean Baptiste Hesse (1806 – 1879), was a French painter.

== Biography ==
He was born in Paris as the son of Henri-Joseph Hesse, a portrait and miniature painter. He attended the École des Beaux-Arts there where he was taught by Jean-Victor Bertin and Antoine Jean Gros. In 1830 he visited Venice and is known for portraits and religious works. He died in Paris.
