= Henri Serrur =

French painter (1794–1876)

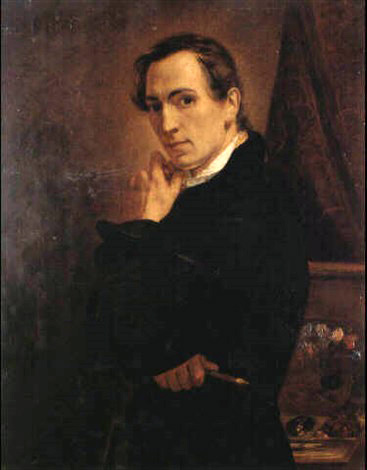
- Self portrait
- Born: 8 February 1794; Lambersart, French Republic
- Died: 31 March 1876 (aged 82); Paris, French Republic
- Education: Beaux-Arts de Paris
- Style: Classicism

Signature
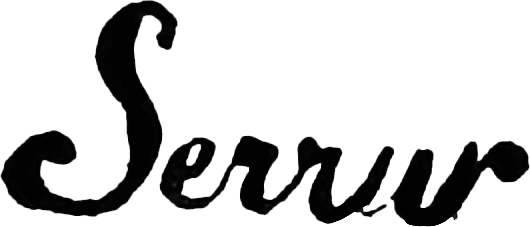

Henri Auguste Calixte César Serrur (February 8, 1794 – March 31, 1876), signed Henry Auguste or Calixte, was a French painter.

A student of Jean-Baptiste Regnault, he specialised on history paintings and battle scenes. He painted the portraits of the nine Avignon Popes kept at the papal palais in Avignon.

== Biography ==
He was born on 8 February 1794 in Lambersart.

Serrur initially studied in Lille and was given the opportunity to continue his artistic training in Paris. He was a pupil of Jean-Baptiste Regnault and entered the Ecole des Beaux-Arts de Paris. From 1819, he exhibited several times at the Salon de Paris and received several awards. His style can be classified as classicist.

He specialised in antique or medieval history scenes and battles. He also painted portraits, including those of nine Avignon popes.

He died on 31 March 1876 in Paris.

== Gallery ==
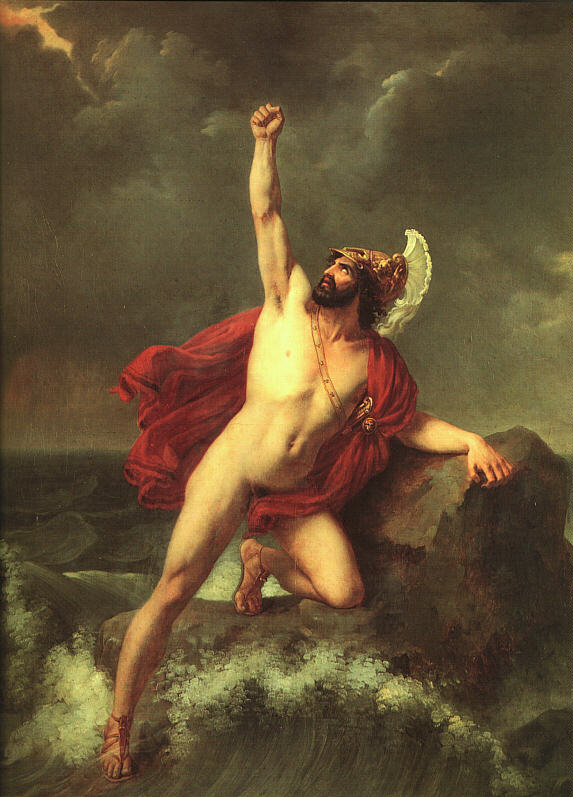
La mort d'Ajax (Death of Ajax) (1820), Palais des beaux-arts de Lille

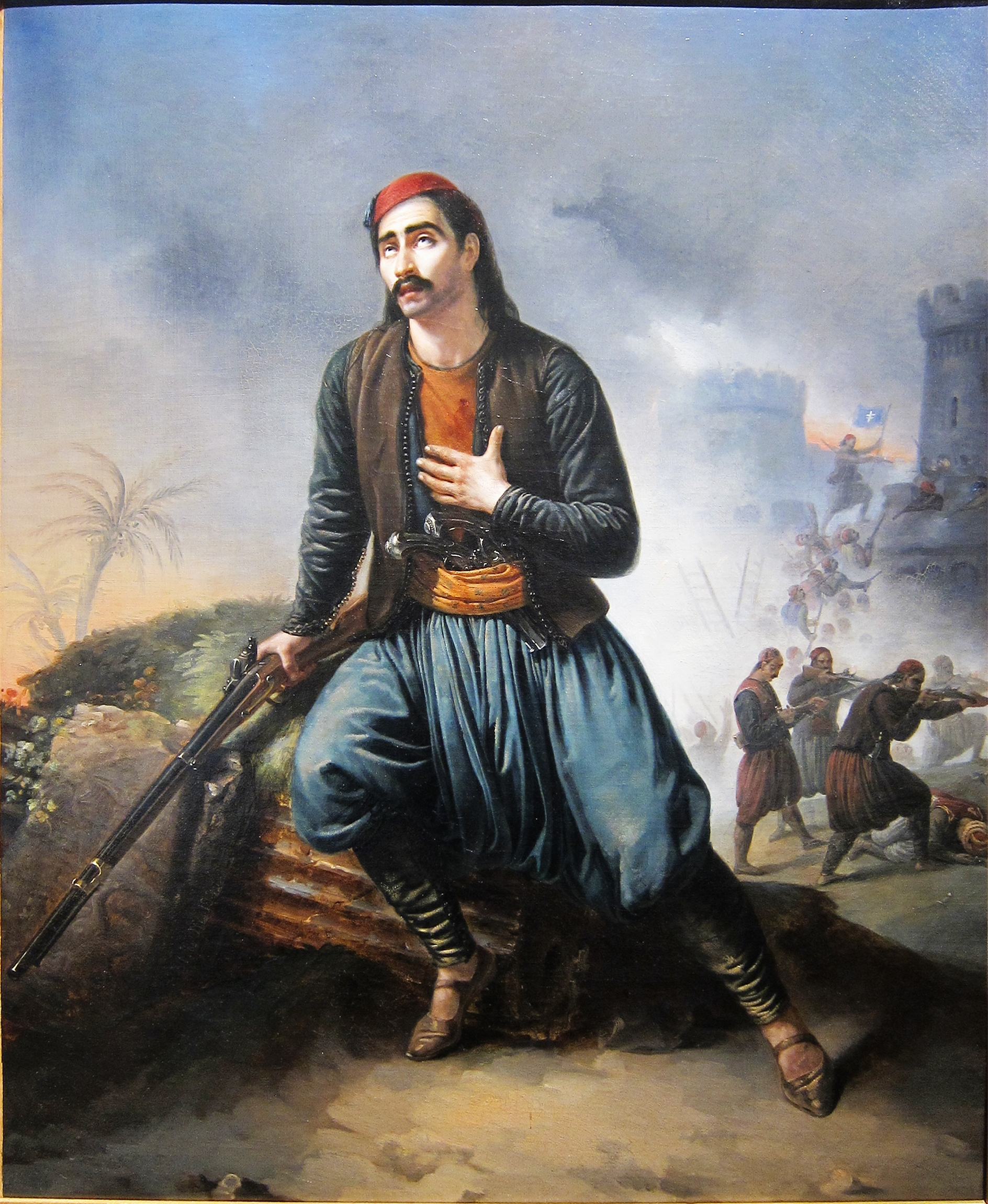
Mort d'un soldat grec à la mort de Tripolitza en 1820 (Death of Greek Soldier during the death of Tripolitza in 1820) (1825), Musée de la Chartreuse de Douai

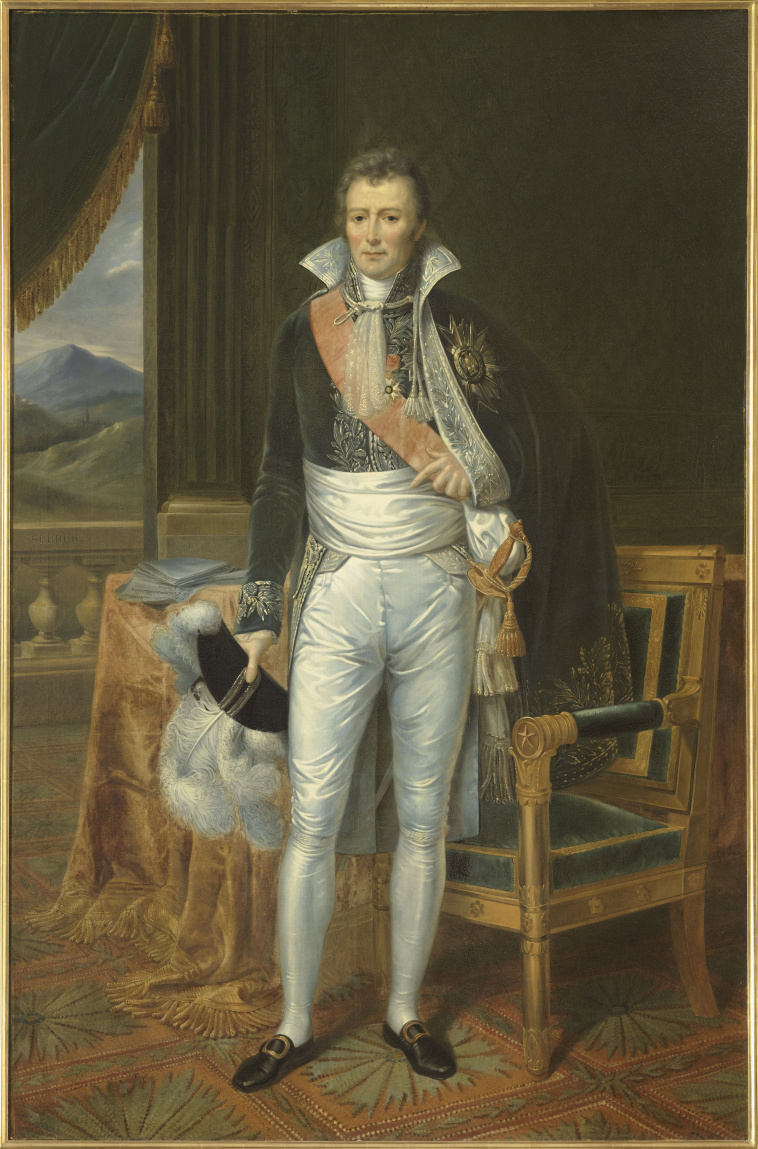
Jean François Aimé Dejean (Luxembourg Palace)
