= Battle of Lake Huleh (1157) =

Battle fought between Zengids and Kingdom of Jerusalem

- Part of the Crusades
Date	June 1157
Location	Hula Valley, modern-day Israel 33°6′12″N 35°36′33″E
Result	Zengid victory

Belligerents
Kingdom of Jerusalem; Knights Templar	Zengids

Commanders and leaders
Baldwin III of Jerusalem; Hugh of Ibelin (POW); Bertrand de Blanchefort (POW); Odo of St Amand (POW)	Nur ad-Din Zangi

Strength
Unknown	Unknown

Casualties and losses
Unknown but serious	Unknown

In the Battle of Lake Huleh in June 1157, a Crusader army led by King Baldwin III of Jerusalem was ambushed and badly defeated by Nur ad-Din Zangi, the emir of Aleppo and Damascus. While the king and some fighting men escaped to a nearby castle, a large number were killed or made prisoner. The Latin Kingdom of Jerusalem escaped worse damage when their adversary became ill and was unable to follow up his victory. The Hula Valley is located in the northeast part of modern-day Israel. At the time of the battle, the area belonged to the Kingdom of Jerusalem.

== Background ==
In 1154, Nur ad-Din Zangi achieved his goal of seizing Damascus and welding Syria into a Zengid empire. Instead of confronting a group of Muslim emirates and being able to play them off against one another, the Crusader states (Kingdom of Jerusalem, County of Tripoli and Principality of Antioch) faced a unified threat to their existence.

Each year, the Damascenes pastured large flocks in the area of Banias on the Franks' territory, whose permission they had secured. In February 1157, Baldwin unwisely attacked them, seizing the animals to pay his kingdom's debts. This act of aggression violated a truce. Infuriated, Nur ad-Din immediately began launching raids on the Franks in the vicinity.

== Battle ==
Nur ad-Din laid siege to the fortified town of Banias at the foot of Mount Hermon. In June, King Baldwin III of Jerusalem assembled a Frankish army and marched to the relief of Banias and its Knights Hospitaller defenders. While Baldwin and his knights camped near Lake Huleh in the upper Jordan River valley, they were surprised and defeated by forces under Nur ad-Din. The chronicler William of Tyre noted that "no watch was kept in the Latin camp." Historian R. C. Smail writes that the setback was caused by Baldwin's "carelessness and lack of normal precaution when in the neighborhood of the enemy." Baldwin and his surviving soldiers took refuge in the nearby castle at Safad. Losses were considerable. King Baldwin barely escaped capture while Hugh of Ibelin, Bertrand of Blancfort and Odo of St Amand were captured by Nur ad-Din. Nur ad-Din paraded the heads of the Franks and his captives roped together in the streets of Damascus. Ibn al-Qalanisi wrote of many Crusader prisoners and severed heads being presented in a victorious celebration in Damascus.

Beyond the heavy casualties suffered in the combat, few consequences attended the Christian defeat. Banias remained a Latin territory until 1164. Nur ad-Din fell ill soon after his victory, and in his absence, Baldwin mounted a campaign in northern Syria. The Franks failed in a siege of Shaizar but recovered the castle of Harim for the Principality of Antioch in the winter of 1157. This set the stage for Nur ad-Din's crushing victory over the Crusaders at the Battle of Harim in 1164. But the next conflict would be the Battle of Butaiha in 1158.
