= Pierre-Antoine Labouchère =

French historical painter

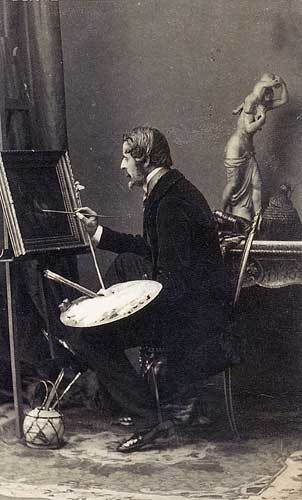

Pierre-Antoine Labouchère (1807-1873) was a French historical painter.

== Biography ==
He was born in Nantes, and was intended for a commercial career. He began business in Antwerp. Afterwards he traveled in America, China, and Italy, and finally became a pupil of Paul Delaroche in Paris.

== Works ==
The subjects of his works are largely drawn from the actors and incidents of the Reformation. They include: "Charles Quint à Londres" ("Charles V in London," 1844), "Melanchthon, Pomeranus et Cruciger traduisant la Bible" ("Melanchthon, Pomeranus, and Cruciger translating the Bible," 1846). He also did some drawings for Jean-Henri Merle d'Aubigné's Vie de Luther. Among his portraits is one of Guizot (1863). In 1849 he stayed with his sister and brother-in-law (Charles Royds-Smith) at Southrop Manor (near Lechlade in Goucestershire , UK) where he painted 'Southrop House'.
