= Éloi Firmin Féron =

French painter

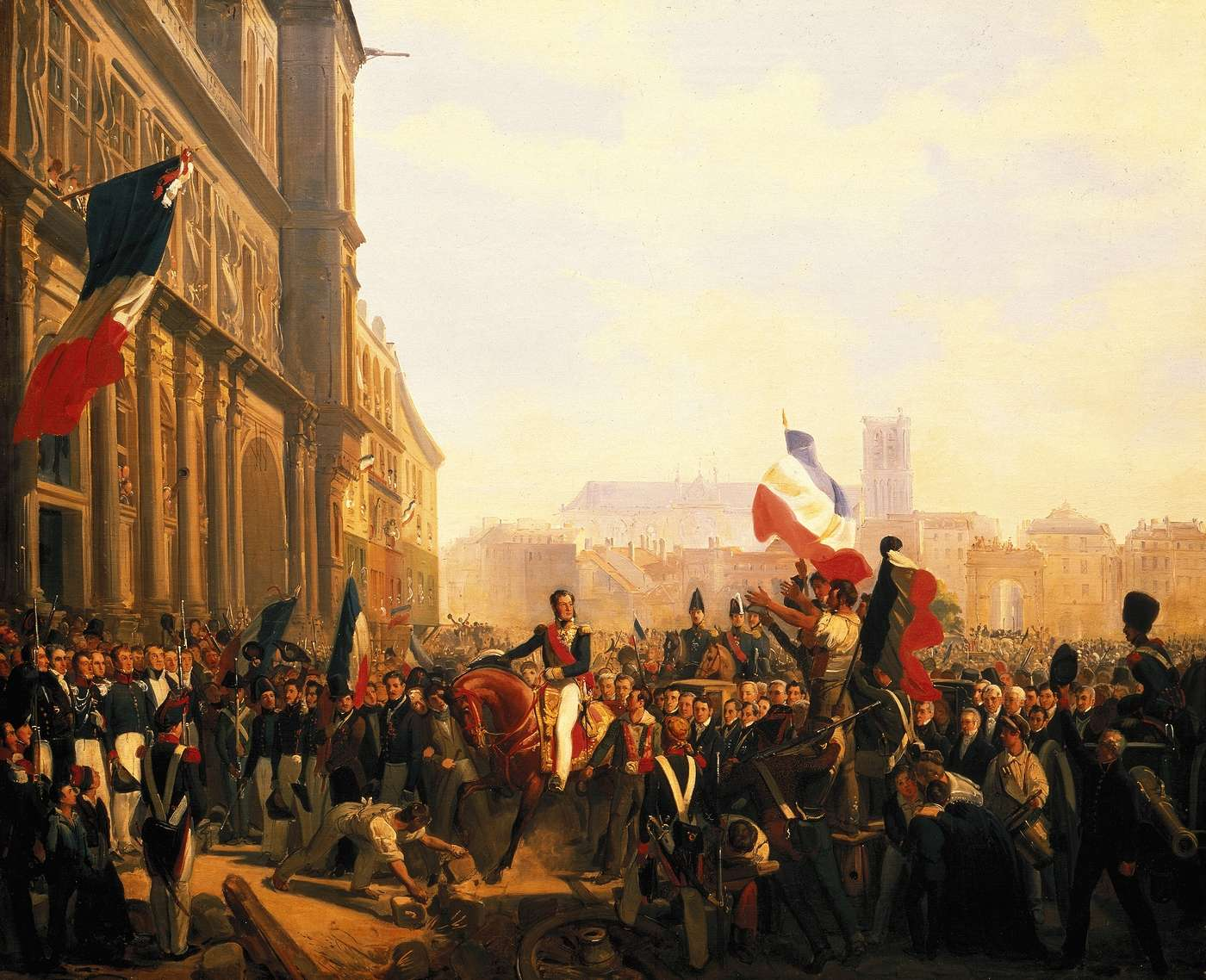
The Arrival of the Duke of Orleans at the Hôtel de Ville on 31 July 1830 (1837 painting by Féron, after an 1836 work by Charles-Philippe Larivière)

Éloi Firmin Féron (French pronunciation: [elwa fiʁmɛ̃ feʁɔ̃]; 1802–1876) was a French neoclassicist painter. A student of Antoine-Jean Gros, he won the Prix de Rome for his Damon et Pythias in 1826, aged "twenty-four and a half." He went on to become a favourite of Louis Philippe I and his sons and contributed to the galleries of Versailles., where most of his major works are now on exhibit, including Entrée de Charles VIII à Naples (1837), Bataille de Fornoue (1838), Prise de Rhodes (1840), besides various portraits.

== Gallery ==
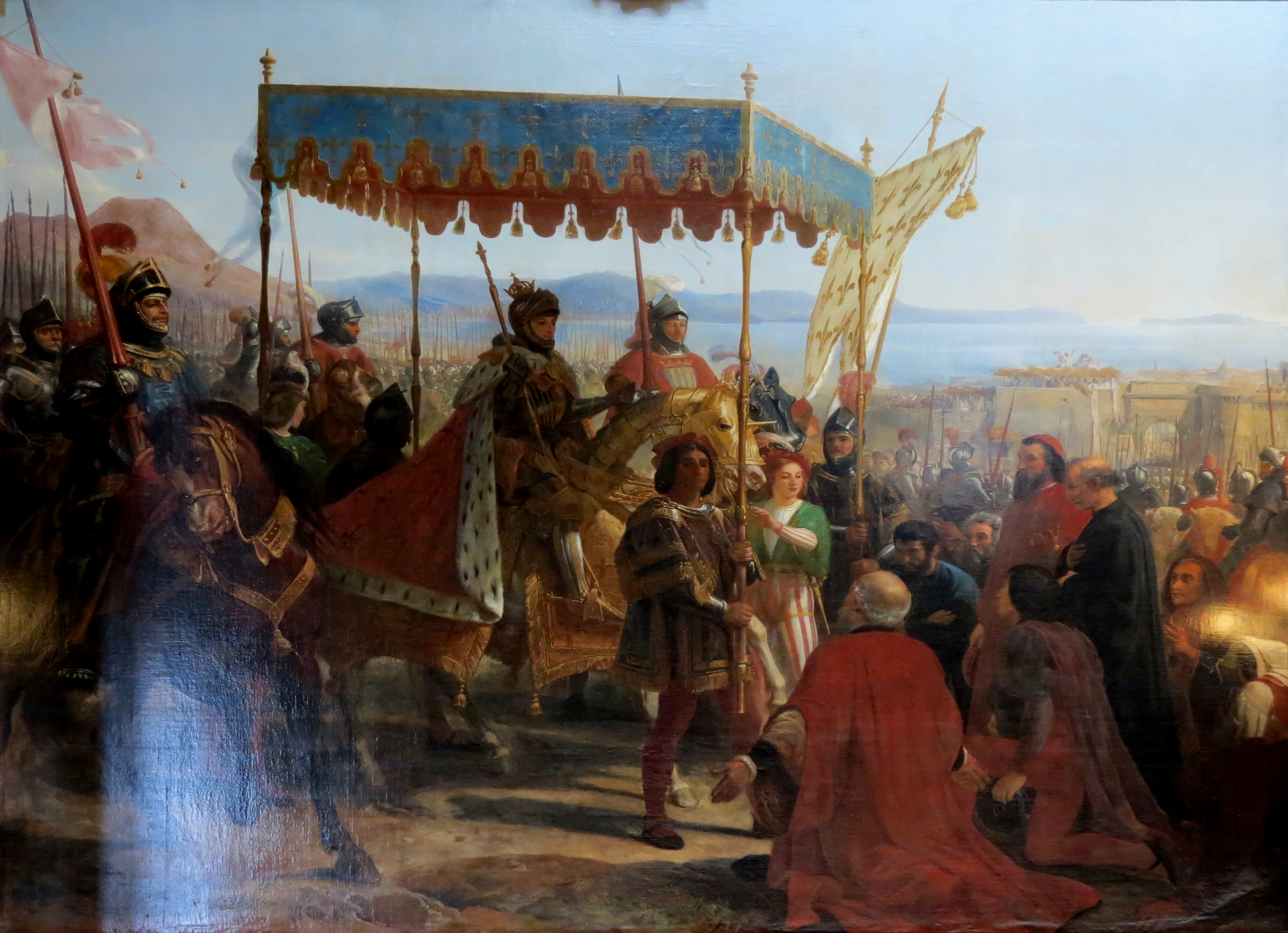
The Entry of Charles VIII into Naples, 1837

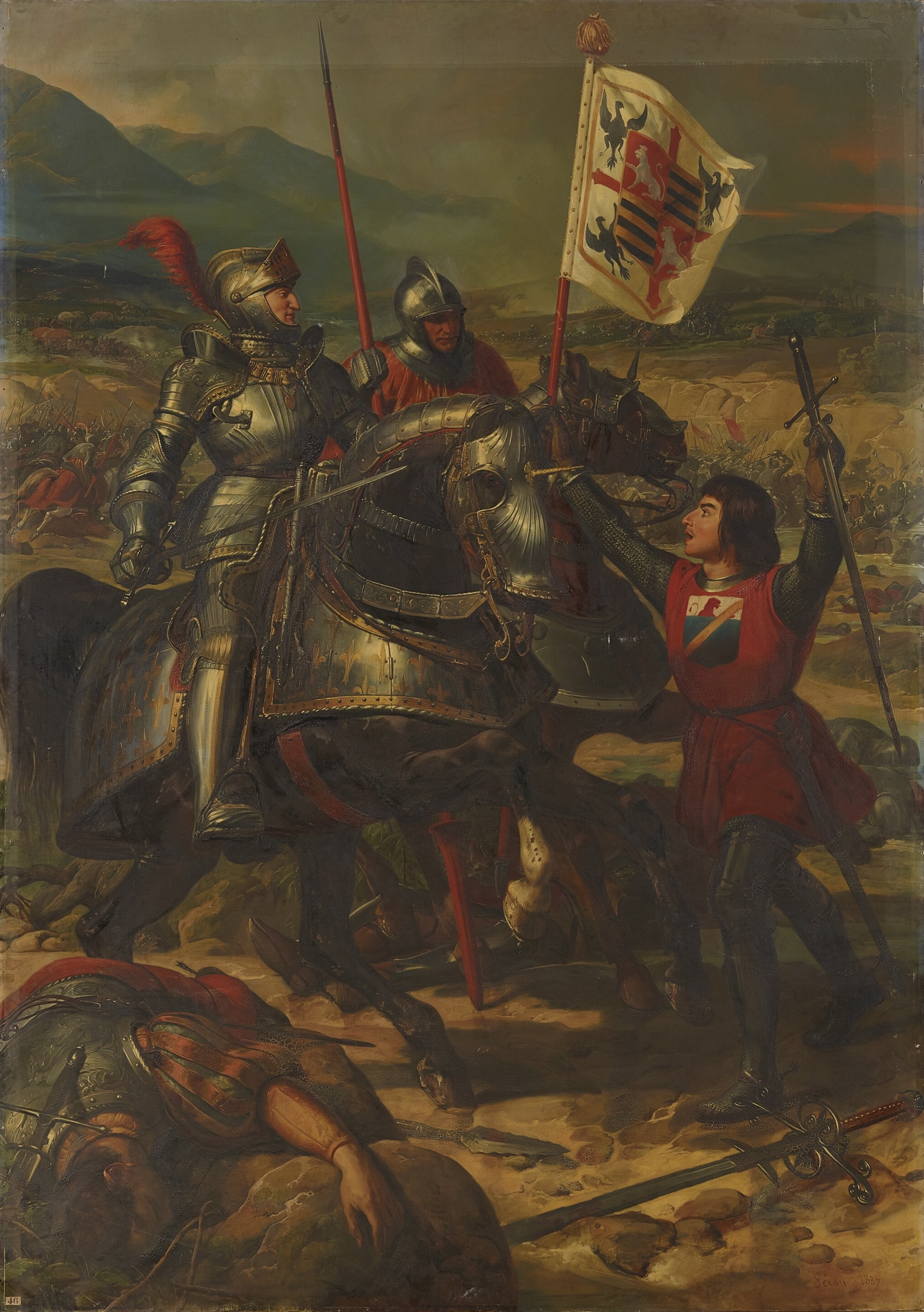
The Battle of Fornovo, 1837

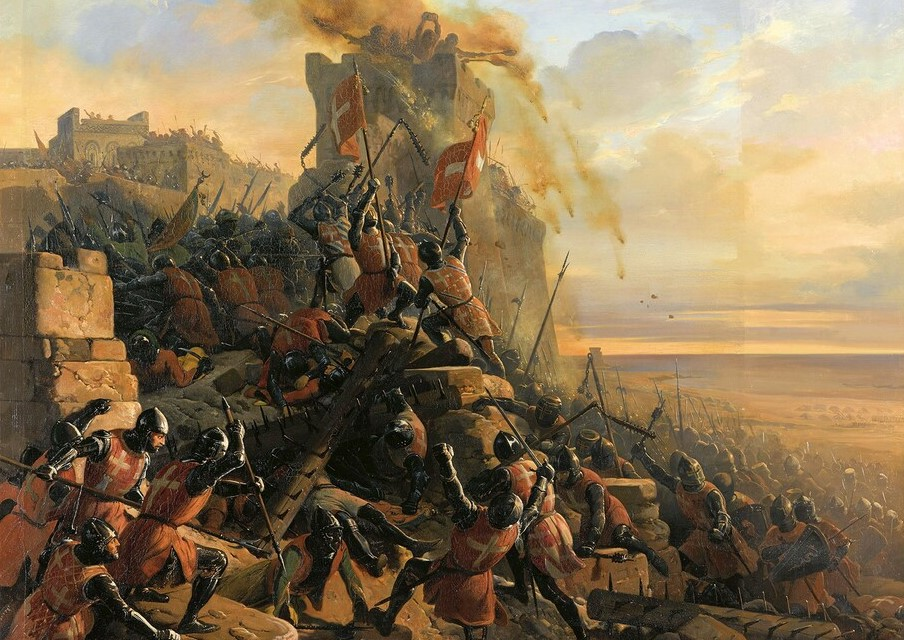
The Siege of Rhodes, 1839

The Battle of Arsuf, 1843
