= François de Labouchere =

French aviator

François de Labouchere, born at Saint-Jean-le-Vieux (Ain) on 18 September 1917 and killed in air-to-air combat on 5 September 1942, was a French pilot of the Second World War.

== Biography ==
François de Labouchere was one of the first pilots to join the Free French Air Force. He was a cadet pilot at the time of the Battle of France, during which his father (a cavalry officer) died. He was in Morocco when the armistice arrived. Going via Gibraltar, he then returned to England, where he met up with his college friend Émile Fayolle.

Appointed as a warrant officer in September 1940, he was posted to No. 85 Squadron in company with Fayolle. In March 1941, promoted to 2nd lieutenant, he was posted to No. 242 Squadron, where Philippe de Scitivaux and Bernard Dupérier were found, still with Fayolle. In July, sacrificing his leave, he was posted at his request to No. 615 Squadron where René Mouchotte and Jean Maridor were stationed. In November 1941 he was posted to the Île-de-France fighter group, the No. 340 (Free French) Squadron, where he became captain and commander of the Versailles squadron on 1 August 1942. On 19 August, the day of the attack on Dieppe, his friend Fayolle disappeared. On 5 September, Labouchere disappeared in turn, during air-to-air combat. His body has never been recovered. He took off at 09.30 (BST) as Yellow 1 in Spitfire BL803/GW-L (TNA, AIR 27/1737/20, Form 541, 340 Squadron, September 1942) and was shot down by JG 26 pilot after 11.30 hours (GST).

== Victories ==
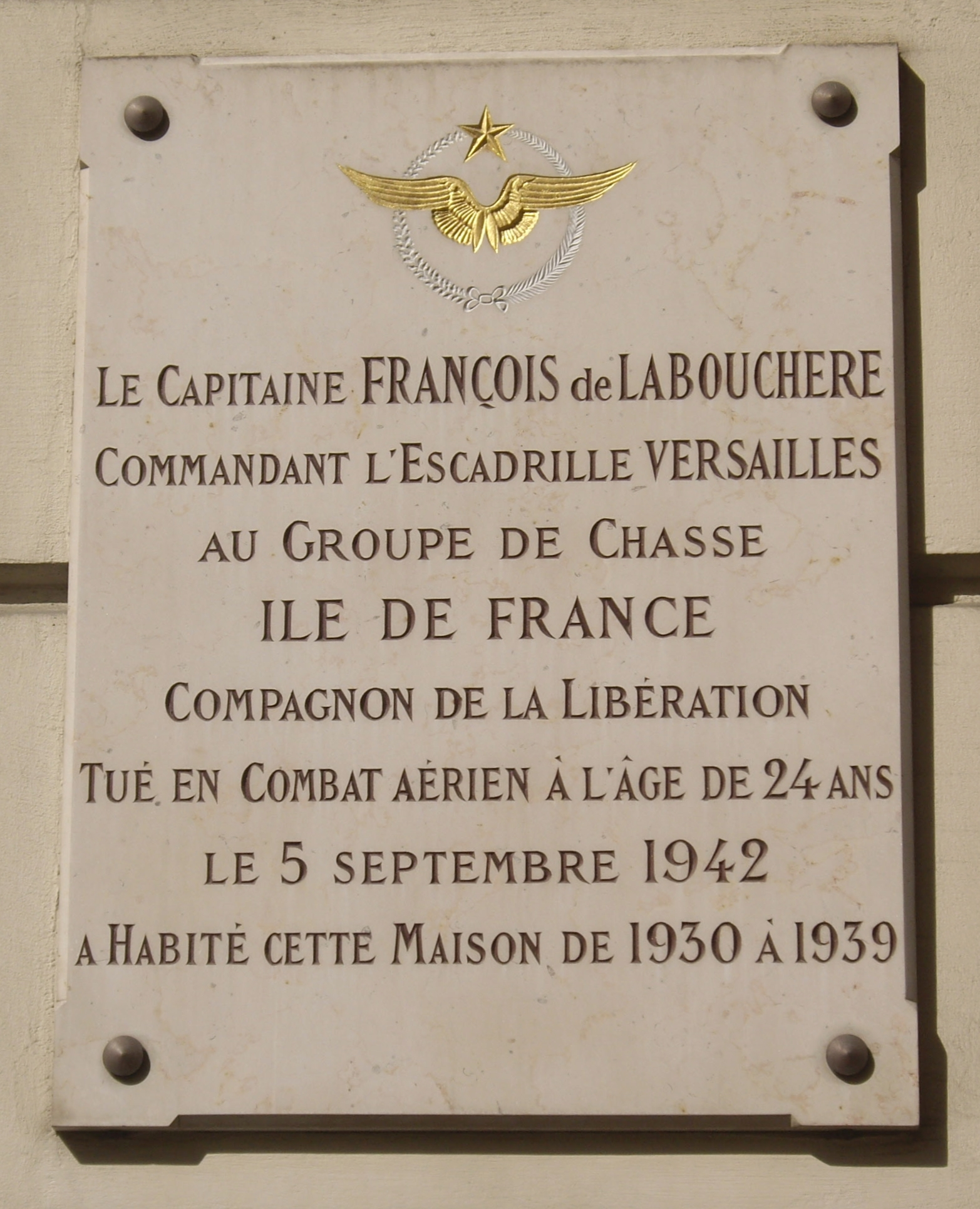
Commemorative plaque on the Parisian house of François de Labouchere at n° 8 de la rue Guy-de-Maupassant

- On 23 June 1941, he shot down a Bf 109 above Desvres.
- On 18 September 1941, he shot down a Bf 109 above Ostend.
- On 19 August 1942, he shot down two Do 217s above Dieppe.

== Decorations ==
- Knight of the Legion of Honour.
- Companion of the Liberation, decreed on 5 January 1943.
- Croix de Guerre 1939–45, with four palms.
- Medal of the Resistance, with rosette.
- Commemorative medal of the voluntary services in Free France.
- Distinguished Flying Cross (United Kingdom)

== Citations ==
- "The most difficult thing is not to accomplish one's duty, but to discern it."
- "Live proudly with misfortune, rather than accept shameful fortune."
