= Binant Series =

Series of paintings commissioned by Alfred Binant

The Binant Series (Scenes of civilian and military life) (French - Suite Binant - Scènes de la vie civile et militaire) was a series of 36 large-format paintings commissioned by (and named after) Parisian art-material dealer Alfred Binant (1822-1904) in the wake of the Siege of Paris. 13 artists were involved, producing a precious record of the recent Franco-Prussian War and Paris Commune, first exhibited in 1872. Only thirteen of the full paintings survive, all of which are now in the Musée Carnavalet, though 36 modellos for the series were rediscovered in the stores of the Musée Gassendi in Digne-les-Bains in June 2017.

== History ==
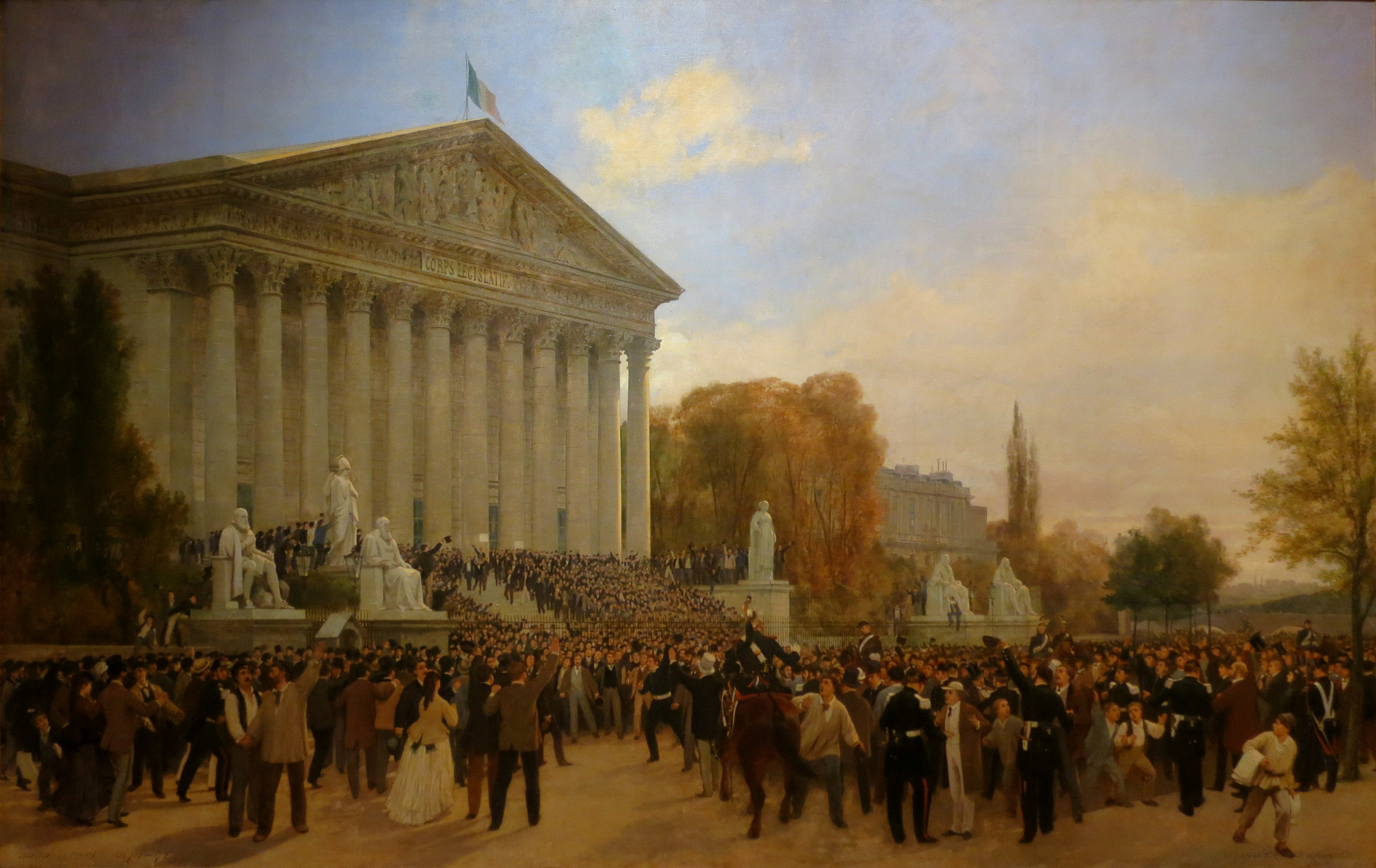
1 : The Palais du corps législatif after its last session (1871), by Jules Didier and Jacques Guiaud (musée Carnavalet).

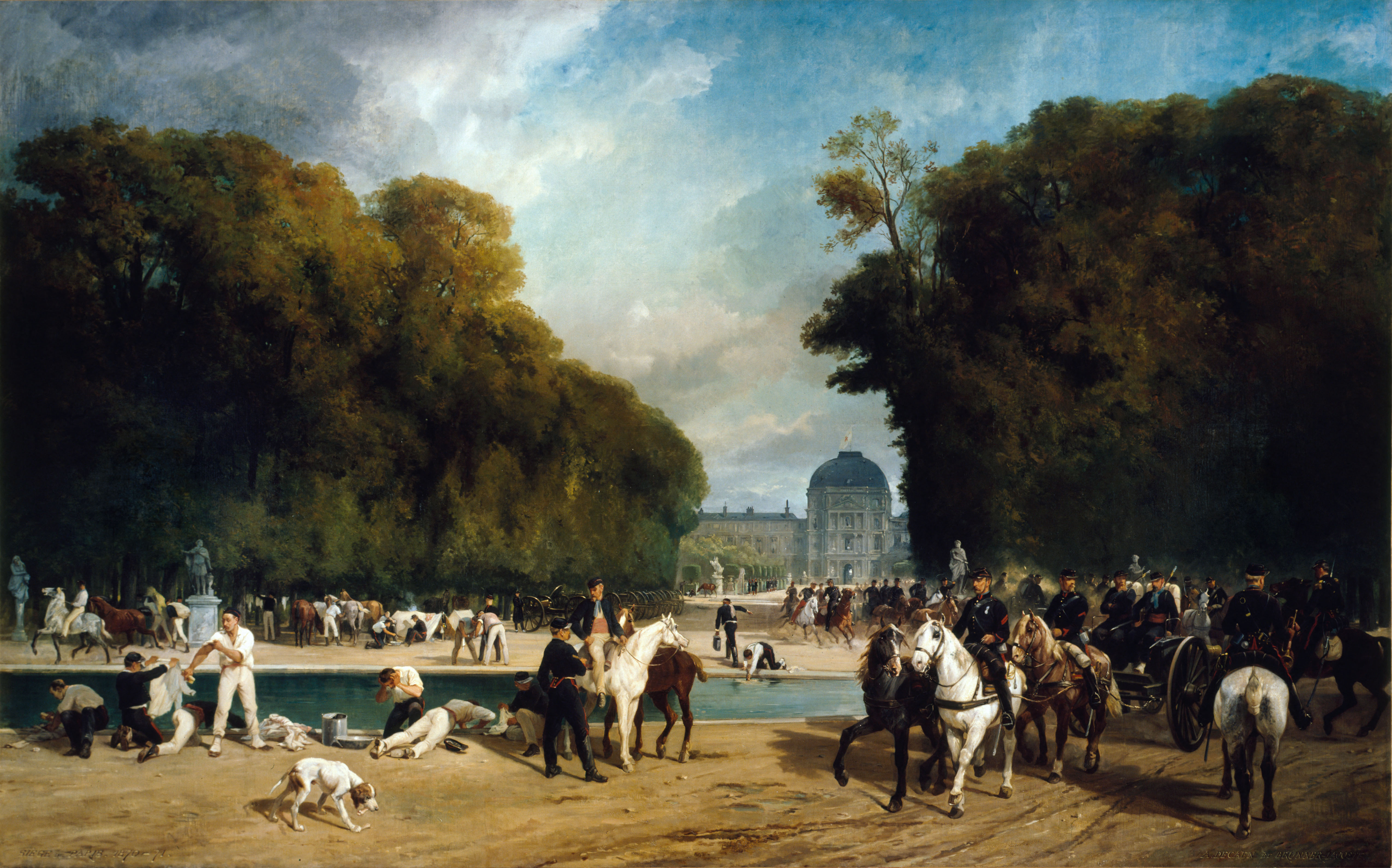
6 : Artillery encampment in the Tuileries Gardens (1871) by Brunner-Lacoste and Alfred Decaen (musée Carnavalet).

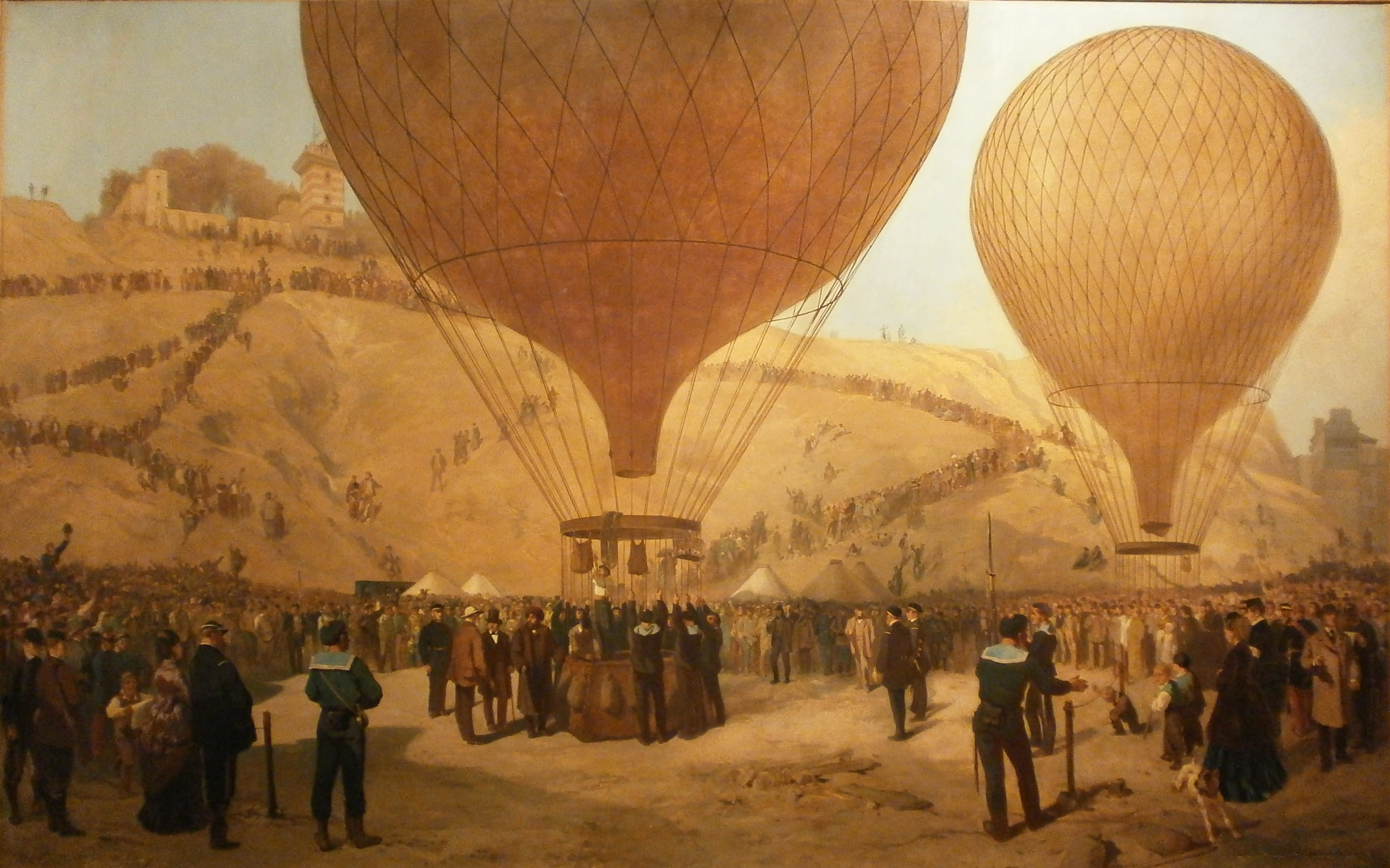
7 : Gambetta leaves in the "Armand-Barbès" balloon on 7 October (1871) by Jules Didier and Jacques Guiaud (musée Carnavalet).

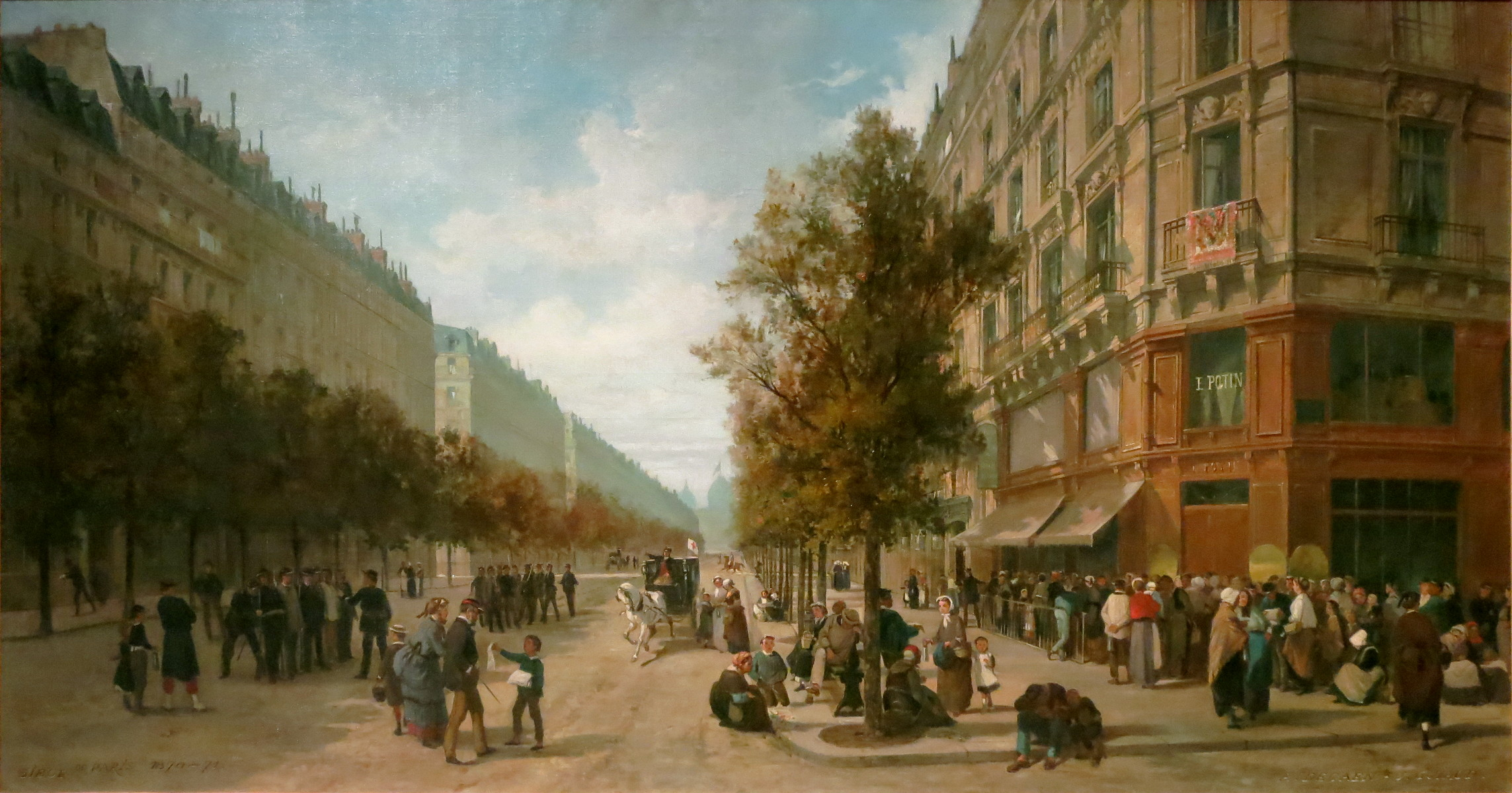
15 : The queue at the doorway of Félix Potin, a grocer, at the corner of rue Réaumur and boulevard de Sébastopol in Paris, in November 1870 (1871) by Alfred Decaen and Jacques Guiaud (musée Carnavalet).

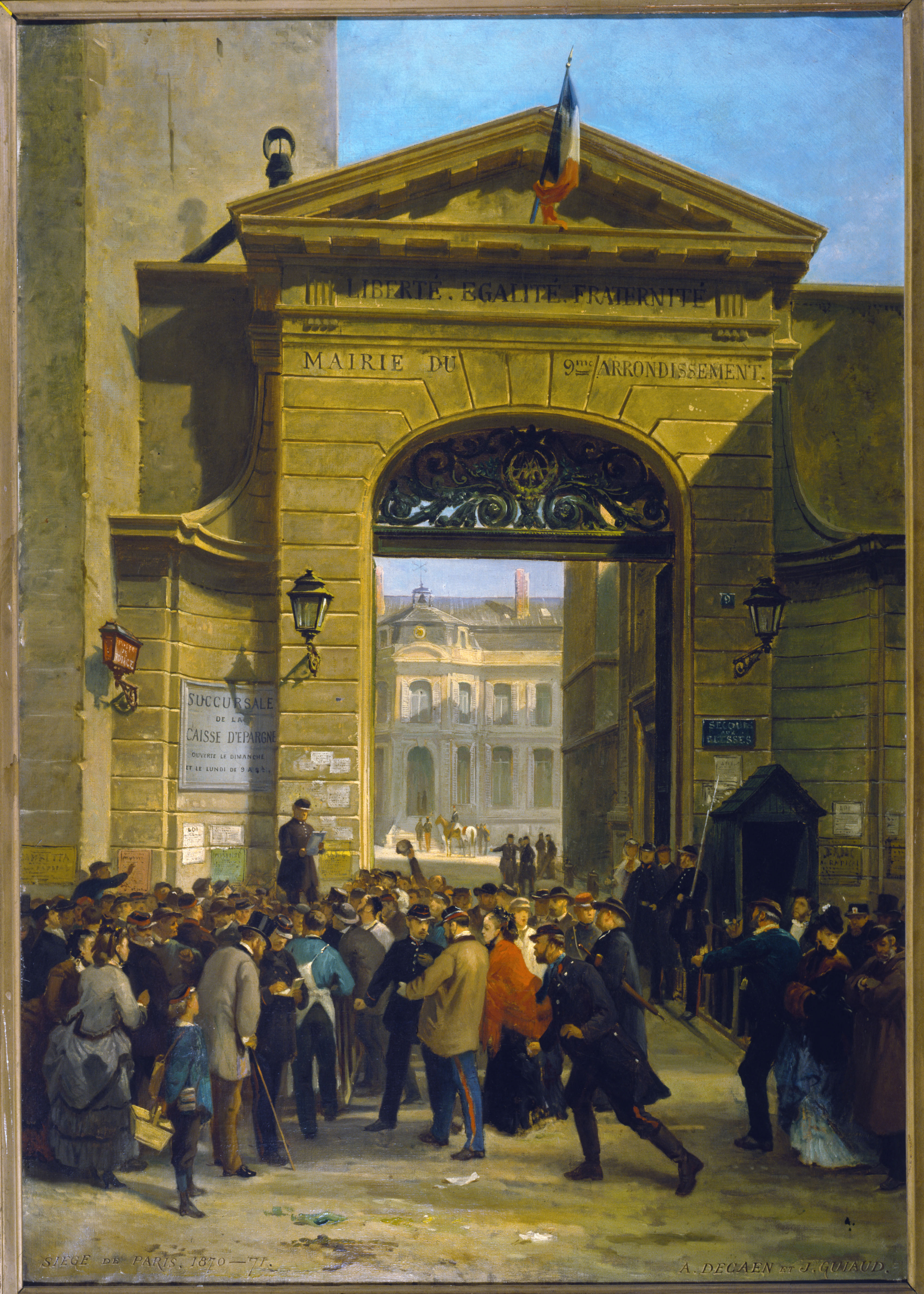
33 : Mayor Drouot reading a dispatch (1871) by Alfred Decaen (musée Carnavalet).

In January 1871, Louis Alfred Binant, a Parisian dealer in paintings, artists' paper, crayons, paintings and other artists' materials with shops on Rue de Cléry and boulevard Rochechouart (now boulevard Marguerite-de-Rochechouart), commissioned thirteen artists to produce 36 large-format oil on canvas paintings "certainly made two metres by four" to document the 1870-1871 siege of Paris. According to him, he also wanted "[to make] a work of memory, for neither books (however well-informed), nor engravings can speak to the eyes and therefore to the spirit as clearly as a painting". The paintings were exhibited from November 1871 to February 1872 at Durand-Ruel's dealership on rue Le Peletier, with the exhibition entitled Le Siège de Paris 1870-71. Exposition des peintures des épisodes civils et militaires de la défense. In September 1898, Binant bequeathed all 36 paintings and a booklet describing each painting to the city of Paris, though only thirteen still survive, all at the musée Carnavalet, which they officially entered in February 1914. The other works (now lost) remained in the stores of the Petit Palais, where they may have been destroyed during the German occupation (1940-1944).

Sylvie Gonzalez, a curator at the musée d'Art et d'Histoire Paul Éluard in Saint-Denis, tried to find the lost works - in June 2017 the 36 modellos, each measuring 22 by 35 cm and produced as a preparatory sketch, were rediscovered in the stores of the musée Gassendi in Dignes-les-Bains. They had been acquired by that museum in 1900 from Binant and were restored by Nadine Gomez before in 2019 being placed in the musée d'art et d'histoire de Saint-Denis, which already had major holdings on the Commune.

== Artists ==
Most of the artists involved worked collaboratively on different paintings at the same time. The oldest of them, Jacques Guiaud, collaborated on 27 paintings and seems to have also been the most active.

- Georges Bellenger
- Émile-Henri Brunner-Lacoste
- Auguste Carliez
- Eugène Carpezat
- Jules Didier
- Alfred Decaen
- Armand-Dumaresq
- Henri-Louis Dupray
- Henri Germain (1842-1898 ?)
- Jacques Guiaud
- Georges-François Guiaud fils (1840-1893 ?)
- Aubin Hervier (1851-1905 ?)
- Émile-Henri Laporte

== List of paintings ==
Before the modellos were rediscovered, all the paintings were known thanks to an album by Armand Dayot, entitled L’Invasion; le Siège de 1870 d’après des peintures, gravures, photographies, sculptures, médailles autographes, objets du temps; followed by La Commune 1871, published by Ernest Flammarion in 1902, which contained photographic reproductions.

1. The Palais du corps législatif after its last sitting
2. Ovation at the statue of the town of Strasbourg
3. The Point-du-Jour Viaduct
4. The banlieue inhabitants return to Paris
5. The Prussian army marches on Paris
6. Artillery encampment in the Tuileries Gardens
7. M. Gambetta leaves in the "L'Armand-Barbès" balloon
8. Battle at Châtillon, artillery offensive
9. Attack on the village of Bagneux
10. King Wilhelm at Versailles
11. 'Vegetable marauders returning to Paris
12. Volunteers enlisting on place du Panthéon
13. Battle at Rueil and La Malmaison
14. The Belleville battalions break into the Hôtel-de-Ville
15. The Queue at a grocer's doorway [Félix Potin]
16. A session at the club Valentino
17. Pigeon messengers
18. Transcription of despatches at the central telegraph office
19. The Bastion Quarante armed by the Joséphine
20. Capture and occupation of the plateau d'Avron
21. The press ambulances at Joinville-le-Pont
22. The wounded from Champigny disembarked at quai de La Mégisserie
23. The naval fusiliers at the Le Bourget attack
24. Réunion du bataillons de marche sur la place du nouvel opéra
25. A guard on the ramparts
26. Inhabitants of the left bank fleeing bombardment
27. Family taking refuge in a cave during bombardment
28. The Pensionnat of the frères de Saint-Nicolas on rue de Vaugirard
29. A municipal canteen
30. A municipal butchers
31. A woodyard burning
32. Capture of the Montretout redoubt
33. Mayor Drouot reading a despatch
34. The Mazas prisoners freed by rioters
35. Riot on 22 January, volley on place de l'Hôtel-de-Ville
36. Bombardment of the fort de la Briche

== Bibliography ==
- Hollis Clayson et Benoît Coutancier, Épisodes civils et militaires du siège de Paris 1870-1871. La suite Binant, Musée Gassendi (Digne-les-Bains) / Musée d’art et d’histoire Paul Éluard de Saint Denis, Illustria Librairie des Musées, 2019, 96 p. ISBN 978-2354040840.
