= Jules André =

French painter (1807–1869)

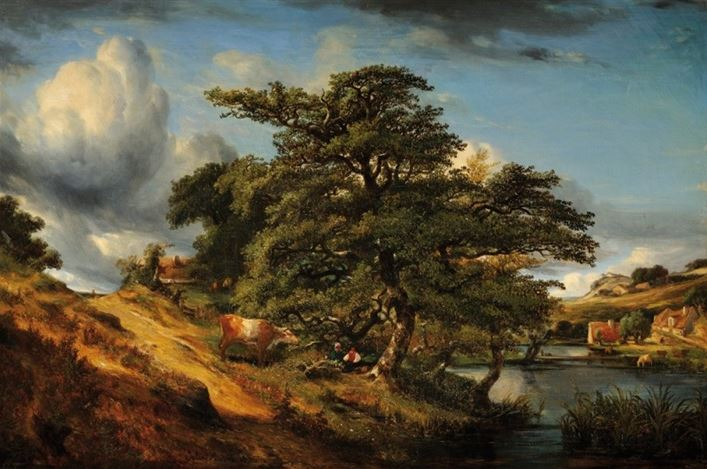
Landscape with Large Oak

Jules André (French pronunciation: [ʒyl ɑ̃dʁe]; 1807–1869) was a French painter.

André was born in Paris in 1807, studied under André Jolivard and Louis Étienne Watelet, and became a landscape painter of merit. He travelled in Belgium, the south of France, and the Rhine country; and he was also employed at the porcelain manufactory at Sèvres.

André painted in a manner halfway between the style of the old French classic landscape painters and that of the modern school. He executed several decorative panels in the new Louvre Palace, and in the Hôtel d'Albe. He obtained a second-class medal in 1835, and the decoration of the Légion d'honneur in 1853.

He died at Paris in 1869. The Galleries of the Luxembourg and Lille possess paintings by him.

His son, Edmond Maethe Alphonse André (1844–1877), who studied under him, and with Isidore Pils, became a genre painter of some repute. In 1876 he painted a 'Halt of Zouaves at Patay.' Edmond died in Algiers in 1877.
