= Pierre Thuillier =

French painter (1799–1858)

Pierre Thuillier (Amiens, June 17, 1799 - Paris, November 19, 1858) was a French painter.

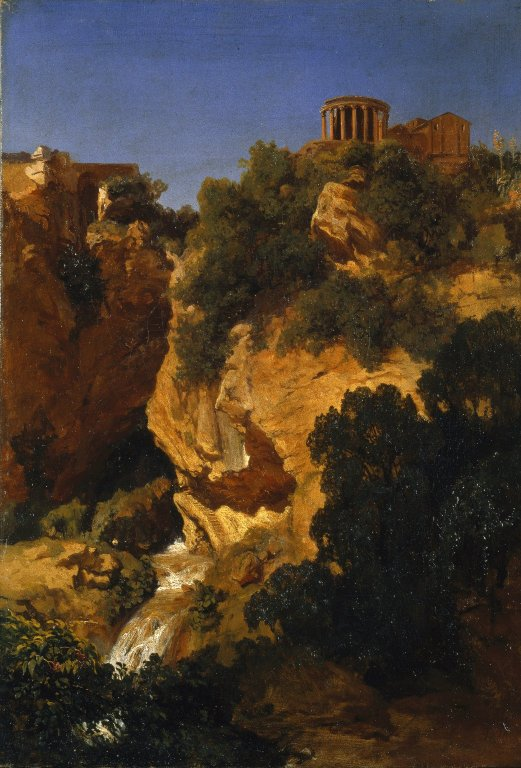
Brooklyn Museum, Veduta di Tivoli, Pierre Thuillier

== Biography ==
Pierre Thuillier was a landscape painter, first a pupil of Louis Étienne Watelet then belonging to the School of Barbizon. He carried out his first artistic activity in the region of Amiens and around the Forest of Fontainebleau between 1831 and 1832. As a young apprentice at the atelier of Watelet he met Théodore Caruelle d'Aligny and left with him later to work in Italy. Later he often stayed in Germany, Switzerland, Italy and Algiers, moving along Maghreb, and then returned to paint in France, particularly in Auvergne.

In 1843 he was made a Chevalier of the Legion d'Honneur.

== Expositions ==
In 1831 he began exhibiting at the "Salon de Paris", where he won awards four times. In particular, he won the 1st Class Medal in 1839 and 1848. In 1854 he won the First Prize at the Geneva Exhibition. He stopped exhibiting at the "Salon" only in 1857.

== Works in public collections ==
- Amiens, Musée de Picardie: Old Tiburtine way, near Tivoli, 1843
- New York, Brooklyn Museum: Vue de Tivoli, circa 1840

== Gallery ==
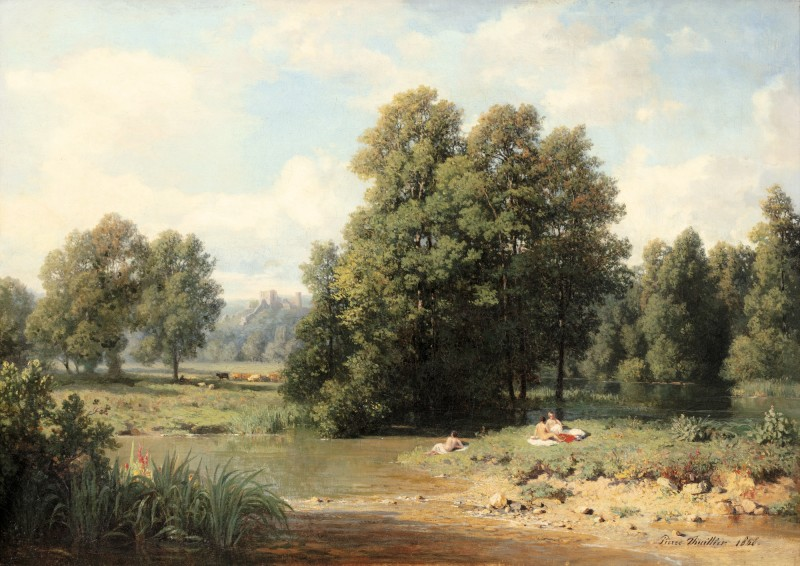
Landscape

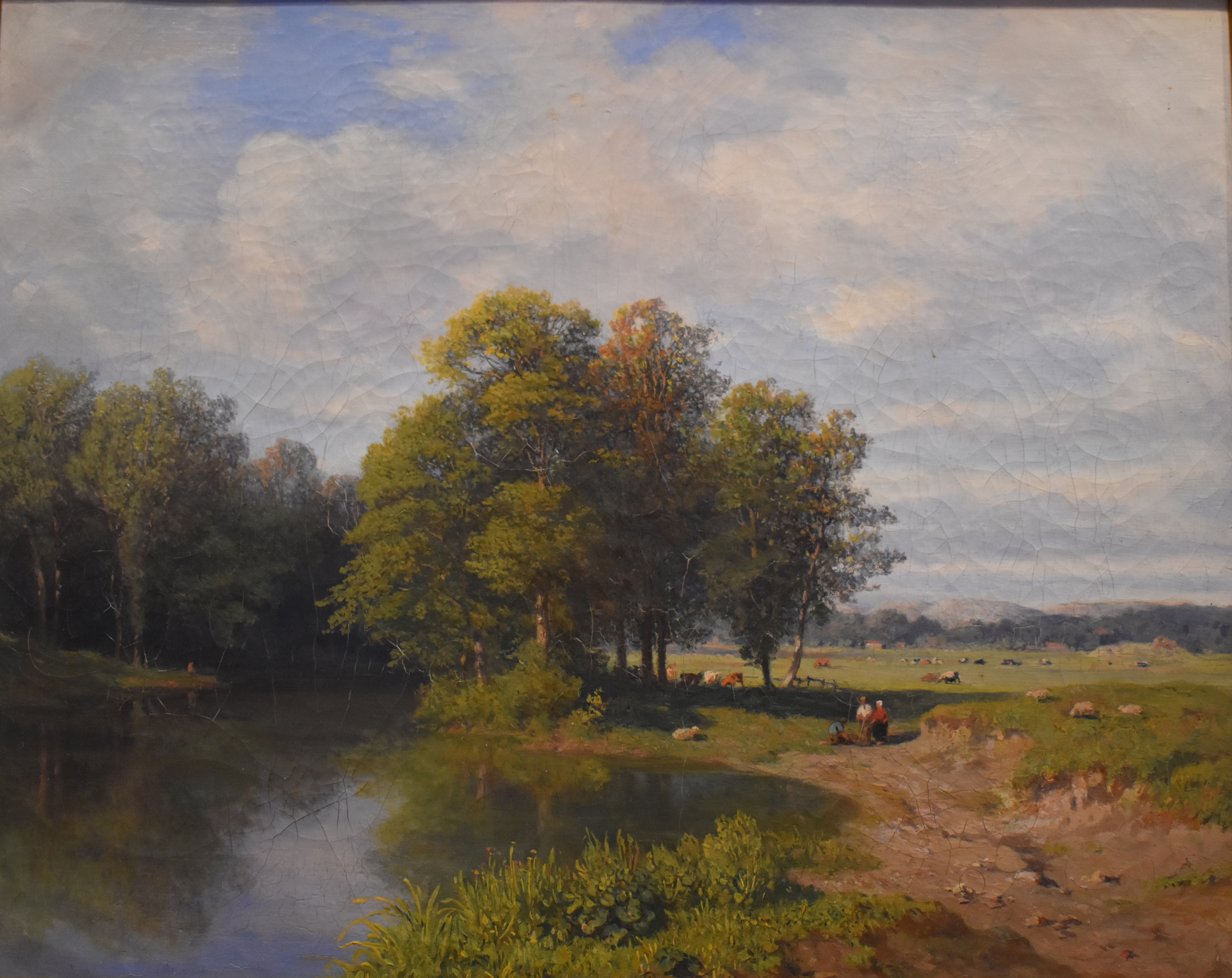
Étude de paysage

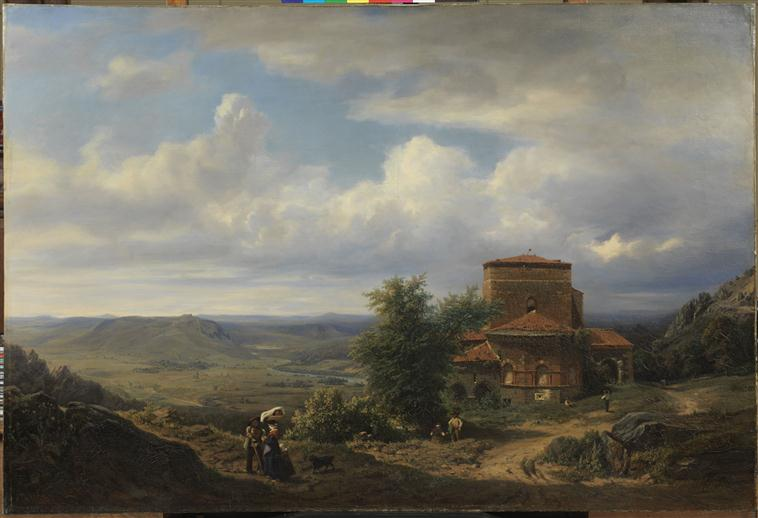
Ancienne abbaye de Doue

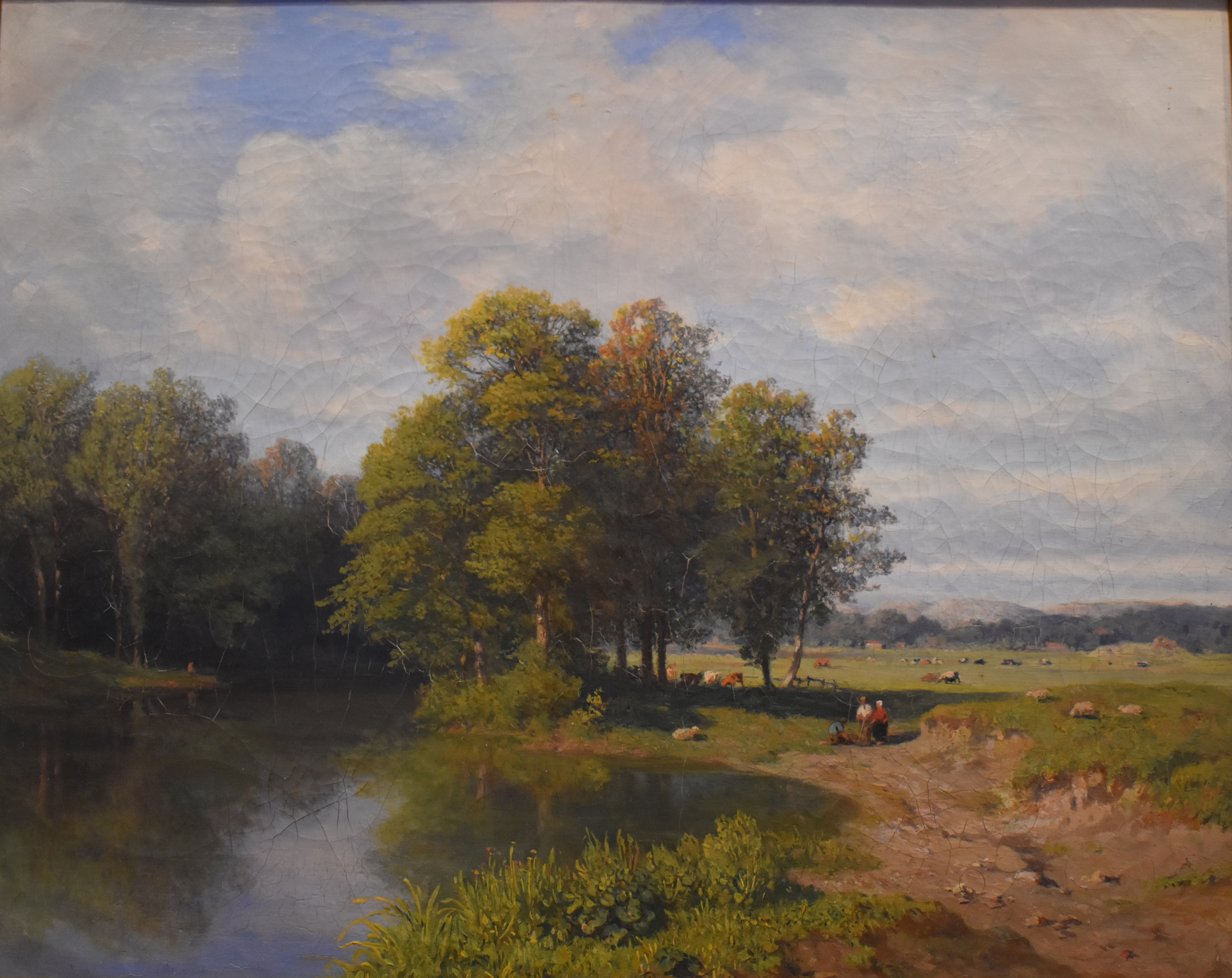
Étude de paysage

== Sister projects ==
- Wikimedia Commons contiene immagini o altri file su Pierre Thuillier
