= Clément-Édouard Bellenger =

French wood-engraver

Georges Bellenger
- Born: 7 November 1851; Pont-Audemer, Eure, France
- Died: July 1898 (aged 46); Paris, France

Clément-Édouard Bellenger (1851–1898) was a French wood engraver and graphic artist. Two of his brothers, Georges and Albert, were also engravers.

== Sources ==
- Sagner, Karin (2021). "Bellenger, Clément-Edouard". Allgemeines Künstlerlexikon (online ed.). New York: K. G. Saur; De Gruyter.
- "Bellenger, Clément Édouard". Benezit Dictionary of Artists (online ed.). Oxford University Press. 2011. doi:10.1093/benz/9780199773787.article.B00015691. ISBN 978-0-19-977378-7.
