= Albert Bellenger =

French printmaker 1846-after 1914

- Born: 18 June 1846; Pont-Audemer, Eure, France
- Died: after 1914

Albert Bellenger (1846–after 1914) was a French wood-engraver and graphic artist. His two brothers Georges and Clément were also engravers.

== Sources ==
- Sagner, Karin (2021). "Bellenger, Albert". Allgemeines Künstlerlexikon (online ed.). New York: K. G. Saur; De Gruyter.
- "Bellenger, Albert". Benezit Dictionary of Artists (online ed.). Oxford University Press. 2011. doi:10.1093/benz/9780199773787.article.B00015689.
