= Prosper Baccuet =

French military officer and painter (1797–1854)

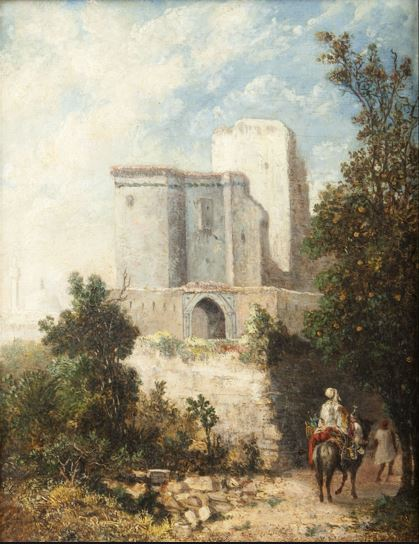
Orientalist Landscape

Pierre Henry Prosper Baccuet (French pronunciation: [pʁɔspɛʁ bakɥɛ]; also Baccuët; 30 October 1797 – 28 June 1854) was a French military officer and landscape painter, known primarily for his Orientalist scenes.

== Biography ==
=== Military career ===
Born in Paris, was the son of a merchant. In 1813, before he was quite sixteen, he enlisted as a quartermaster in the artillery train of the Garde Napolitaine; a unit of the short-lived Napoleonic Kingdom of Naples. By the following year, he had become a sergeant in the Chevau-léger (cavalry) of the same unit and, eventually a Sous-lieutenant in the line infantry.

After the fall of Joachim Murat, the nominal King of Naples, his unit was incorporated into the equivalent unit of the French army. From there, he went into the 7e régiment de chasseurs à cheval (another cavalry group) then, in 1820, into the Grenadiers on Horseback guard, who were part of the Maison militaire du roi de France. He became a full Lieutenant in 1827.

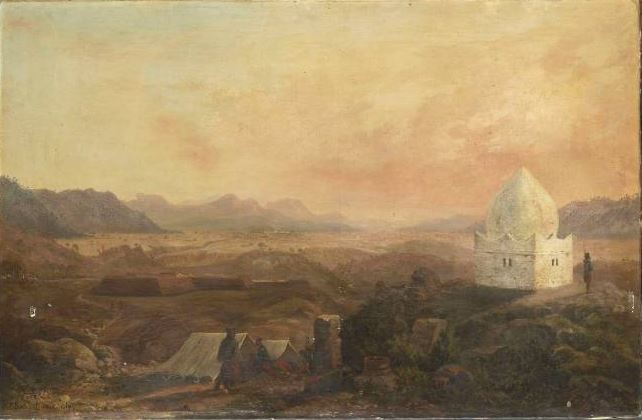
A French camp and Marabout at Lalla Marghiria

That guard was dissolved following the July Revolution, but he was recalled to the 10th Regiment of cuirassiers a year later and was promoted to captain shortly thereafter. He participated in the Ten Days' Campaign of 1832, received the Legion of Honour in 1833, before retiring in 1846. He died in 1854 in Paris.

=== Work as an artist ===
Parallel to his military career, when he was stationed in Paris, he decided to pursue a long-standing interest in art and studied with the landscape painter Louis Étienne Watelet. He had his first exhibit at the Salon in 1827, the year he became a lieutenant. The following year, his artistic talents obtained him a position as an official painter with the Morea Expedition, from which he returned with numerous landscapes and sketches.

From 1841 to 1845, he served in North Africa as a painter/draftsman with the Commission d'exploration scientifique d'Algérie, and participated in an expedition to Kabylie. During this time, he painted landscapes, ancient ruins, and scenes depicting the French conquest of Algeria. Towards the end of his time there, he began a correspondence with the art critic Théophile Gautier, and became his friend.

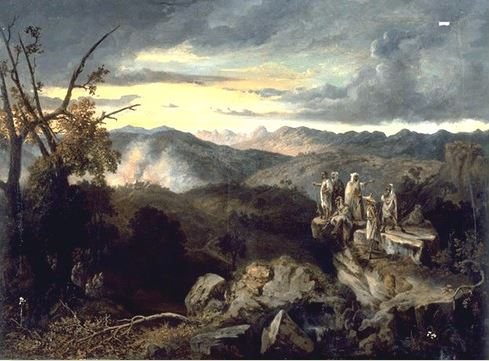
Miliana, Algeria

After returning to Paris, his exhibitions at the Salon included Mediterranean landscapes of Spain and Italy as well as North Africa. Many of these works have made their way into public collections; including the Louvre, Musée des civilisations de l'Europe et de la Méditerranée, Musée des beaux-arts de Bordeaux, the Musée départemental d'Art ancien et contemporain and the Musée d'art moderne André-Malraux.

His works were also used as illustrations in the Exploration scientifique de l'Algérie 1844–1867, published by the Imprimerie Nationale.
