= Jacques Guiaud =

French painter

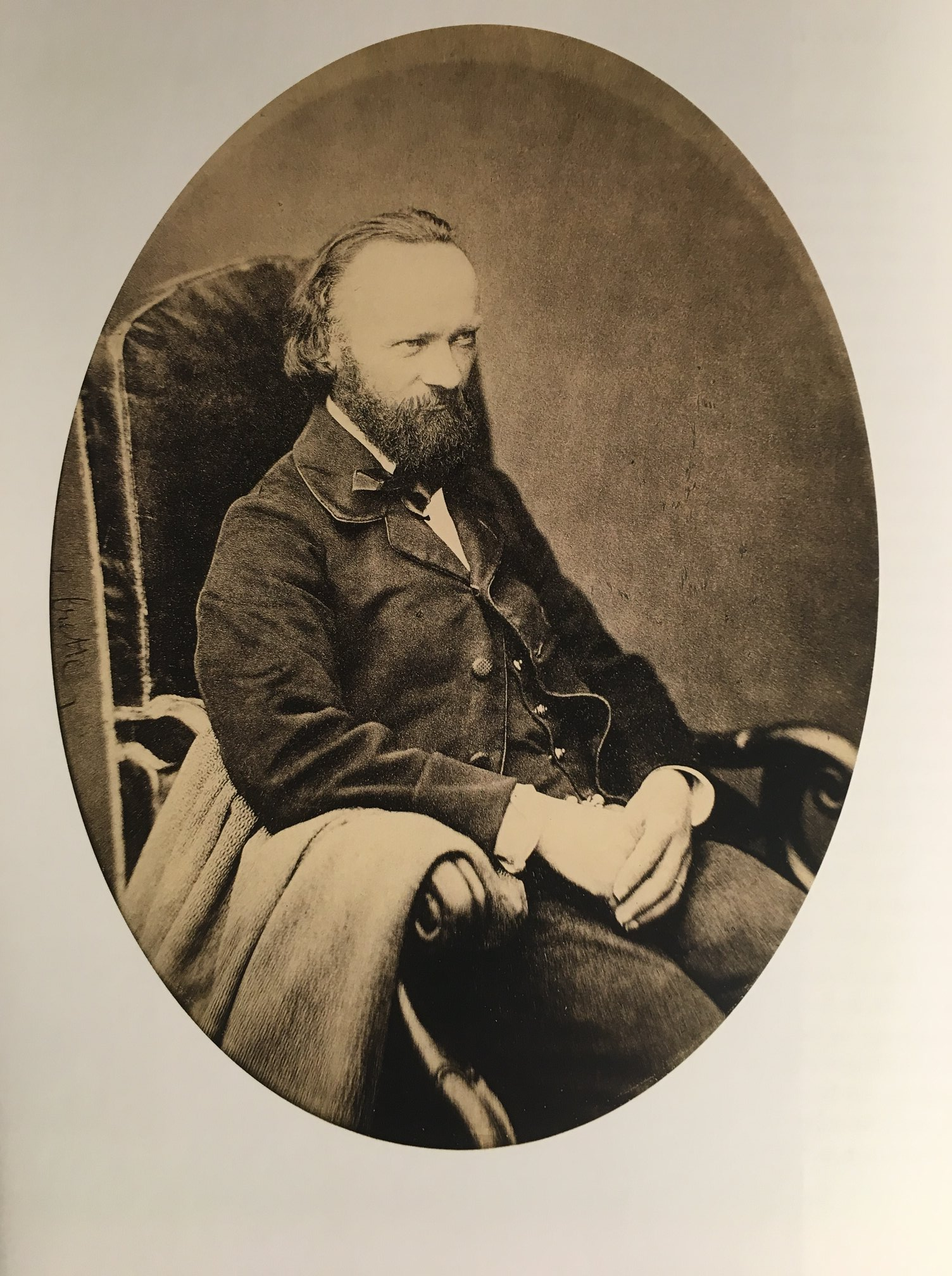
Jacques Guiaud; photograph by Louis Crette (1823-1872)

Jacques Guiaud (17 May 1810, Chambéry - 24 April 1876, Paris) was a French painter and engraver; known for landscapes, cityscapes, historical scenes and assorted watercolors.

== Biography ==
His family was originally from Marseille. Joseph-François Guiaud, his father, was an actor with the Sociétaires of the Comédie-Française. His mother, Marie-Louise-Victoire de Brecq was an artist. He was born in Chambéry while they were on a business trip.

His first art lessons were with Louis Étienne Watelet and Léon Cogniet. He was also influenced by the landscape painter, Jules Dupré. In 1834, he obtained his first major commission: seven tableaux of historical scenes to decorate the Empire Rooms at the Château de Versailles. King Louis-Philippe I bought his painting "The Pas-Bayard at Dinant". He held an exhibit at almost every Salon from 1831 until his death; winning several awards.

He made numerous trips, including a major one to Italy in 1836. After settling in Nice in 1847, where he gave drawing lessons, he travelled to Switzerland, Belgium, Germany, Denmark and along the Manche (English Channel). Many of his works were created for wealthy foreigners who came to vacation on the Côte d'Azur; such as Princess Sophie of Sweden.

In 1860, he and his family moved to Paris. Five years later, he was among several artists chosen to decorate the Château de Fontainebleau; for which he produced some forested landscapes. he continued to travel; adding Spain and Mallorca to his list of places visited. During this period, he also produced engravings for several magazines, including Le Tour du Monde, the Journal des Artistes and L'Illustration. In addition, he created lithographs to illustrate books; including some of the 7,000 that appeared in Voyages pittoresques et romantiques dans l'ancienne France by Baron Isidore Taylor.

His works may be seen in museums throughout France; notably the Musée Carnavalet, which has seven of his paintings with scenes from the Siege of Paris.

== Selected paintings ==
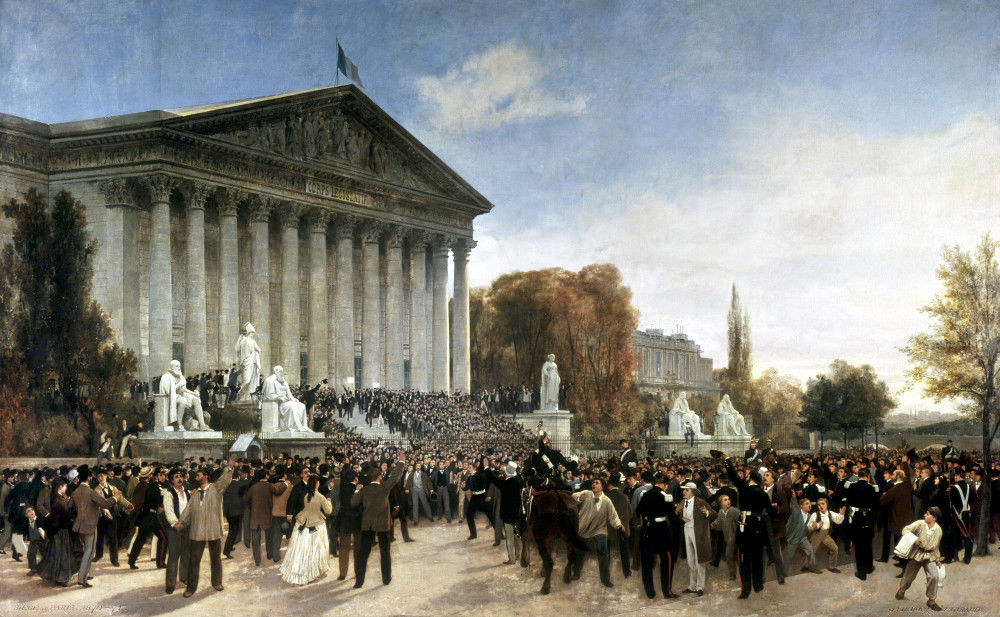
The Palace of the Corps Législatif after the Last Sitting

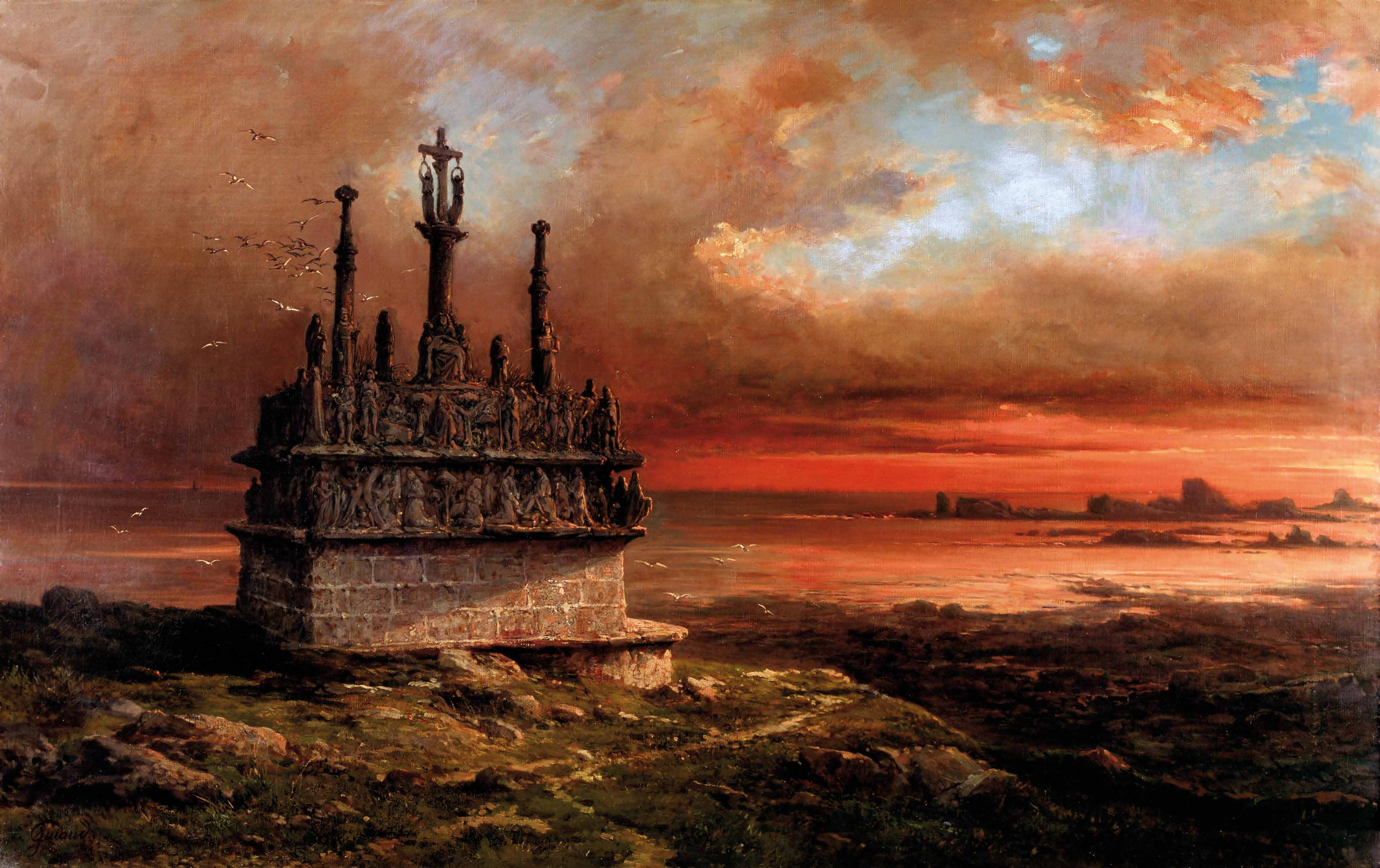
The Calvary at Tronoën

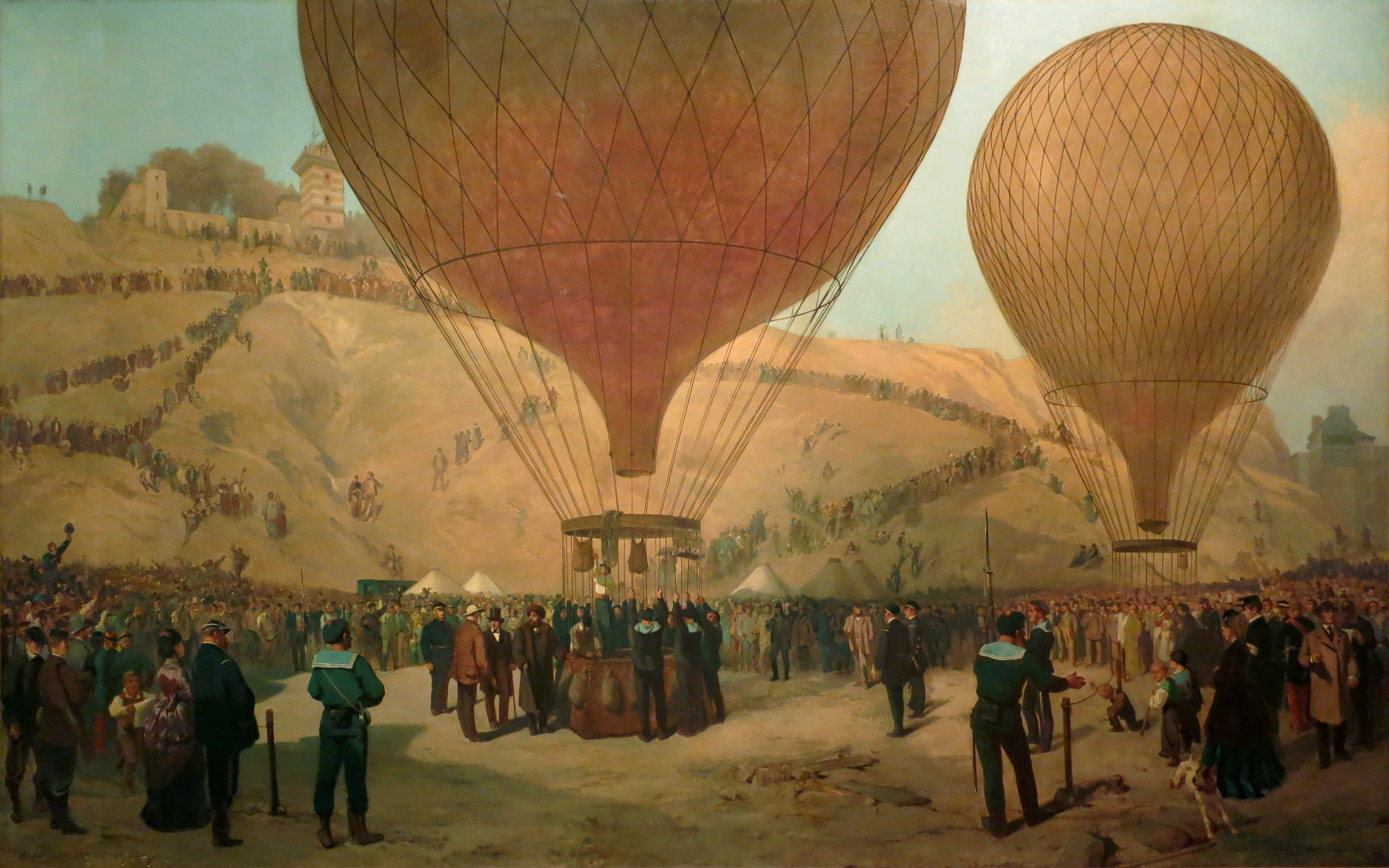
Léon Gambetta Departing on the Armand-Barbès

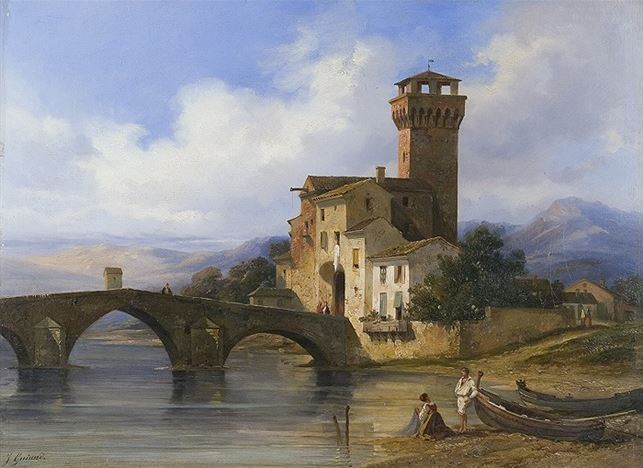
Bridge Architecture in Italy
