= Théodore Caruelle d'Aligny =

French painter (1798–1871)

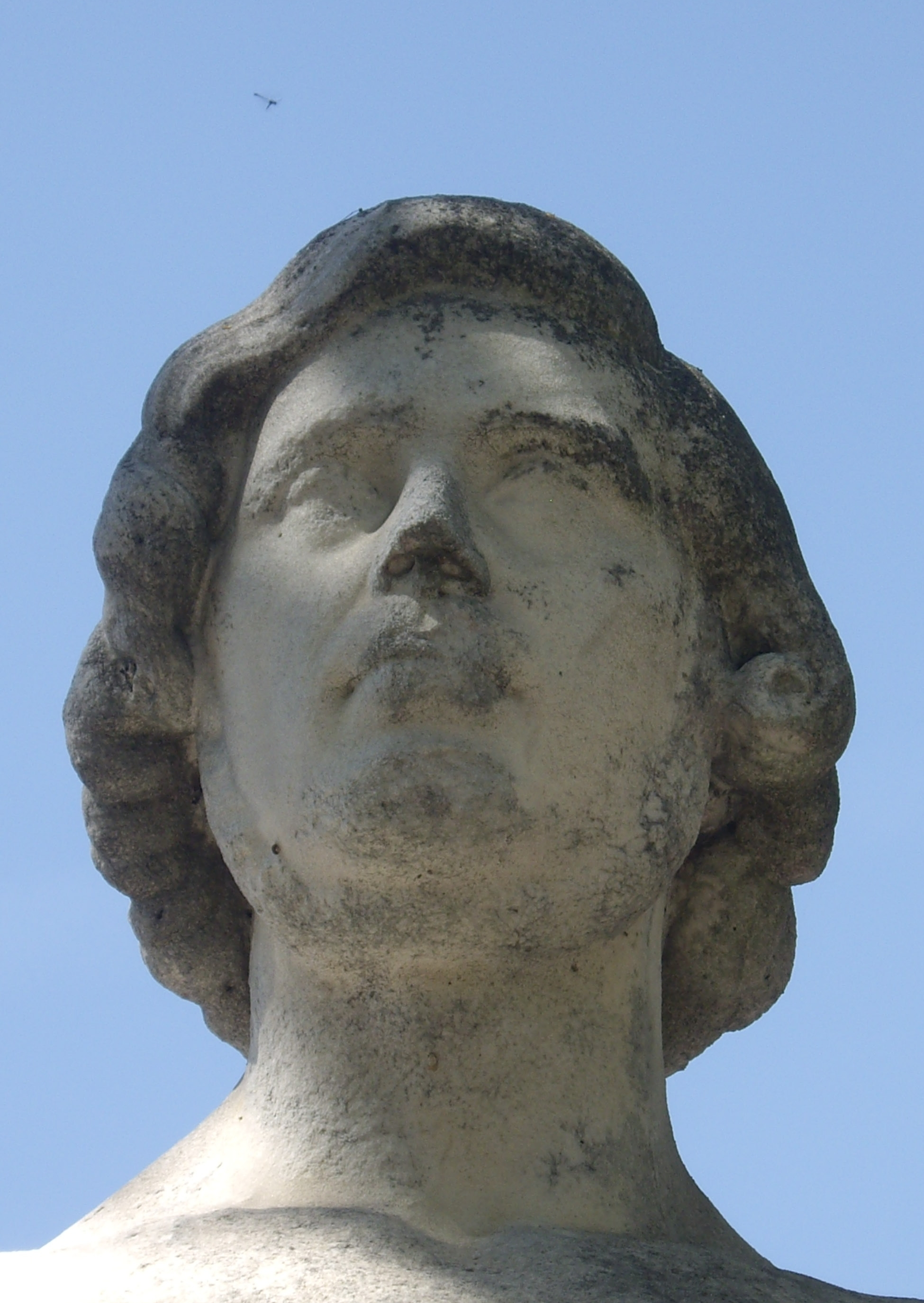
- Born: 10 October 1798
- Died: 24 February 1871 (aged 72); 1st arrondissement of Lyon
- Occupation: Painter, drawer, graphic artist
- Awards: Chevalier of the Legion of Honour (1842)

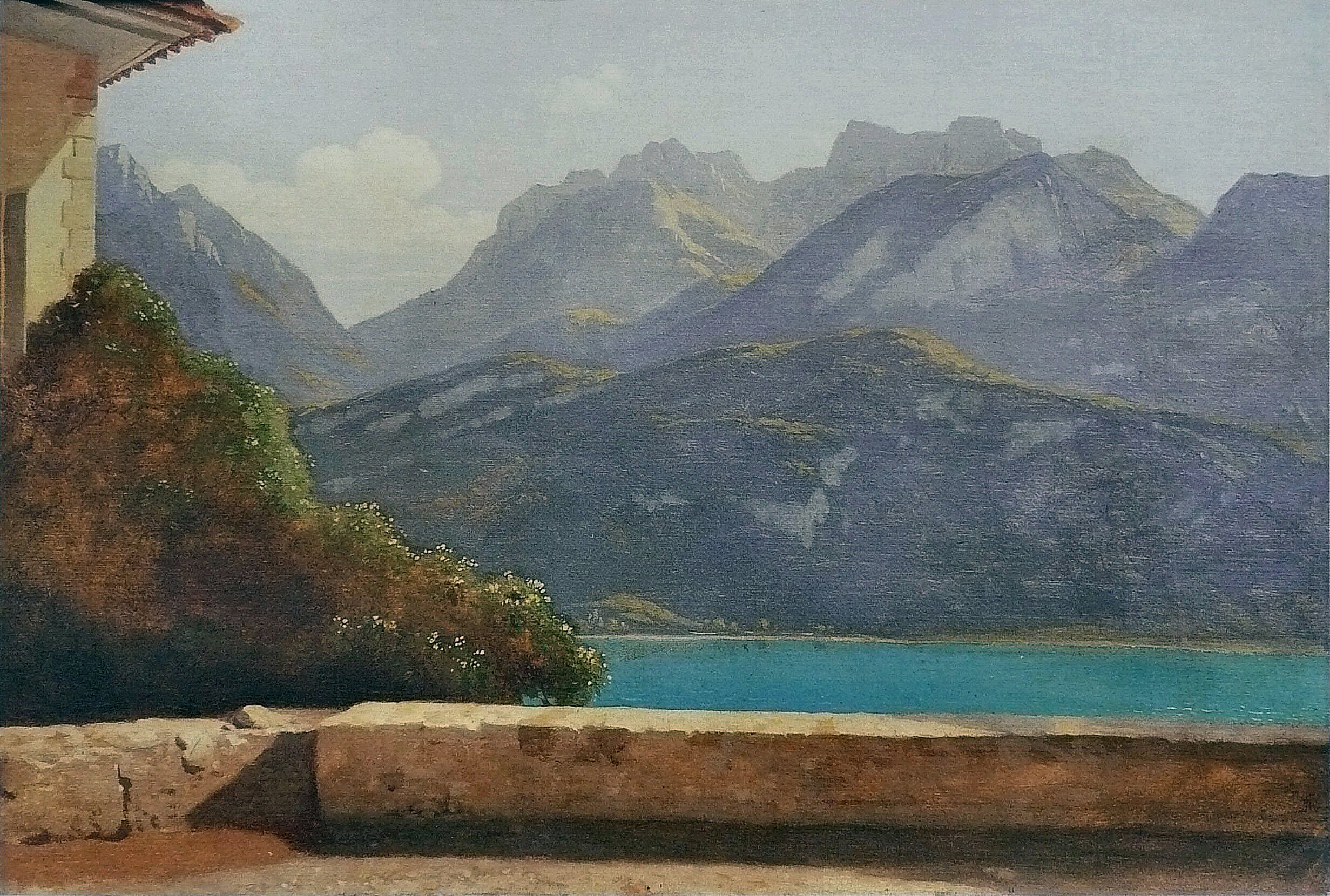
Terrace at the Lake Maggiore. Now at the Musée départemental de l'Oise in Beauvais.

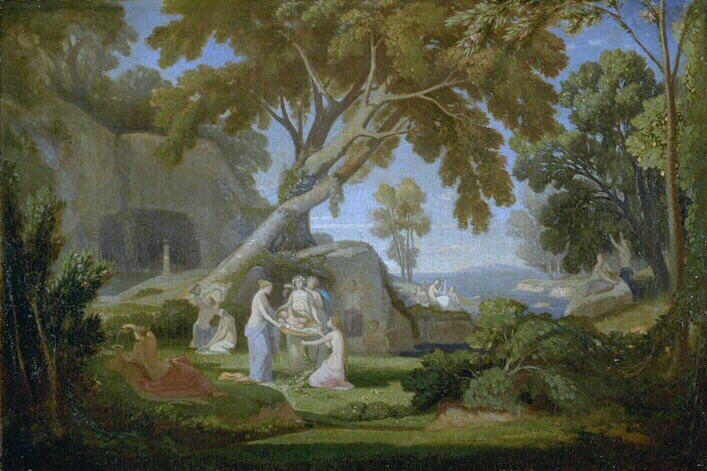
The Infant Bacchus educated by the Nymphs of Naxos, 1848.

Claude François Théodore Caruelle d'Aligny (1798–1871) was a French landscape painter.

== Life ==
He was born at Chaumes (Nièvre) in 1798. In 1808 he went to Paris, where he studied painting under Louis Étienne Watelet, Jean-Baptiste Regnault and Jean-Victor Bertin. He made his debut in 1822 with an historical landscape on the subject of Daphnis and Chloe. In 1824–7 he travelled in Italy, where he became friend of Jean-Baptiste-Camille Corot. He was to return to Italy several more times. He settled in Paris, making frequent visits to Fontainebleau, Barbizon, and the coast of Normandy. In 1843 he went to Greece to make drawings of the major ancient sites, and then continued to Asia Minor.

He was awarded a medal of the first class in 1837, and the Legion of Honour in 1842. His View of Genazzano, Environs of Rome, and View of Royat, France, were sent by the French Government to the International Exhibition of 1862 in London. He was described by Théophile Gautier as the "Ingres of landscape painting".

Aligny died at Lyons in 1871, while holding the post of Director of the École des Beaux-Arts de Lyon.

== Works ==
His most important works include:

- Amiens. Museum. The Good Samaritan. 1834.
- Besançon. Museum. Christ at Emmaus. 1837.
- Bordeaux. Museum. The Infant Bacchus educated by the Nymphs of Naxos. 1848. (pictured)
- Caen. Museum. Death of Du Guesclin. 1838.
- Carcassonne. Museum. Hercules and the Hydra. 1842.
- Nantes. Museum. The Entrance of the Village of Corpo di Cava, between Naples and Salerno.
- Paris. S.-Paul.-S.-Louis. Landscape, with Baptism of Christ.
- Paris. Saint-Étienne-du-Mont.'Two Landscapes with Biblical subjects.
- Rennes. Museum. Landscape, with a Monk at Prayer. 1839.

He also etched a series of ten views of the most celebrated sites of ancient Greece.
