= Georges Bellenger (engraver) =

- Born: 28 December / 9 June / 12 October 1847; Rouen, France
- Died: November 1915 / 1918; Paris, France

Signature
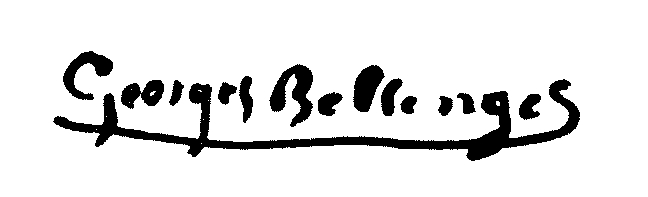

Georges Bellenger (1847–1915/18) was a French painter, lithographer, graphic artist and engraver. His brothers Clément and Albert were also engravers.

== Sources ==
- Sagner, Karin (2021). "Bellenger, Georges". Allgemeines Künstlerlexikon (online ed.). New York: K. G. Saur; De Gruyter.
- "Bellenger, Georges". Benezit Dictionary of Artists (online ed.). Oxford University Press. 2011. doi:10.1093/benz/9780199773787.article.B00015693. ISBN 978-0-19-977378-7.
