= Louis Étienne Watelet =

French painter

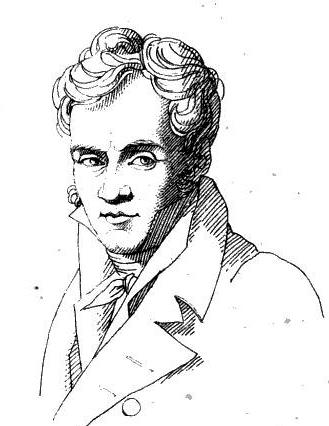
Louis Étienne Watelet; sketch by Jacques Marie Noël Frémy after an earlier portrait by "Muneret" (?)

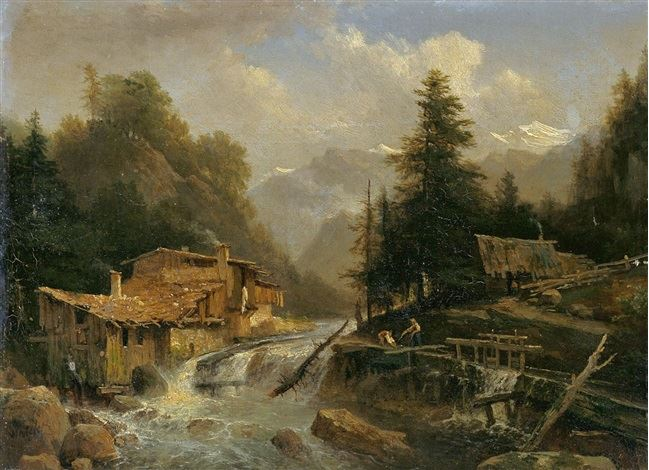
Mountain Landscape with a Mill Stream

Louis Étienne Watelet (25 August 1780, Paris - 21 June 1866, Paris) was a French landscape painter and art teacher.

== Biographie ==
His father was a "Marchand-mercier" (entrepreneur). He is generally credited with being an autodidact. The painter, Charles Gabet (1793-1861), says that he had "no other masters but nature and the love of his art". Nevertheless, he is known to have frequented the studios of the painter Pierre-Henri de Valenciennes and the engraver, Georges Malbeste. His first exhibition at the Salon came in 1799 and he participated regularly for the remainder of his life, receiving a second-class medal in 1810 and a first-class medal in 1819. He was named a Chevalier in the Legion of Honor in 1825.

He was a prolific painter who travelled widely to work en plein aire; visiting the south of France, Savoy, Italy (which had a significant effect on his work), Belgium and the Tyrol. He strove to give his landscapes a historical feeling, in the Romantic style.

His works were generally popular, but the fierce and caustic art critic, Théophile Gautier proclaimed, after the Salon of 1833, that "As for Watelet and his like, it is impossible for them to be more worthless. They died a long time ago." (Quant à MM. Watelet et consorts, il est impossible d’être plus nuls. Ils sont morts il y a longtemps).

Many notable landscape painters served their apprenticeship in his workshop at the École des Beaux-arts; notably Prosper Baccuet, Théodore Caruelle d'Aligny, Paul Delaroche, Abel Dufresne, Jacques Guiaud and Pierre Thuillier.

His works may be seen at the Louvre, the Musée Magnin, Musée Crozatier, Musée Fabre and the Musée des beaux-arts de Valenciennes, among many others.
