= André Jolivard =

French painter (1787–1851)

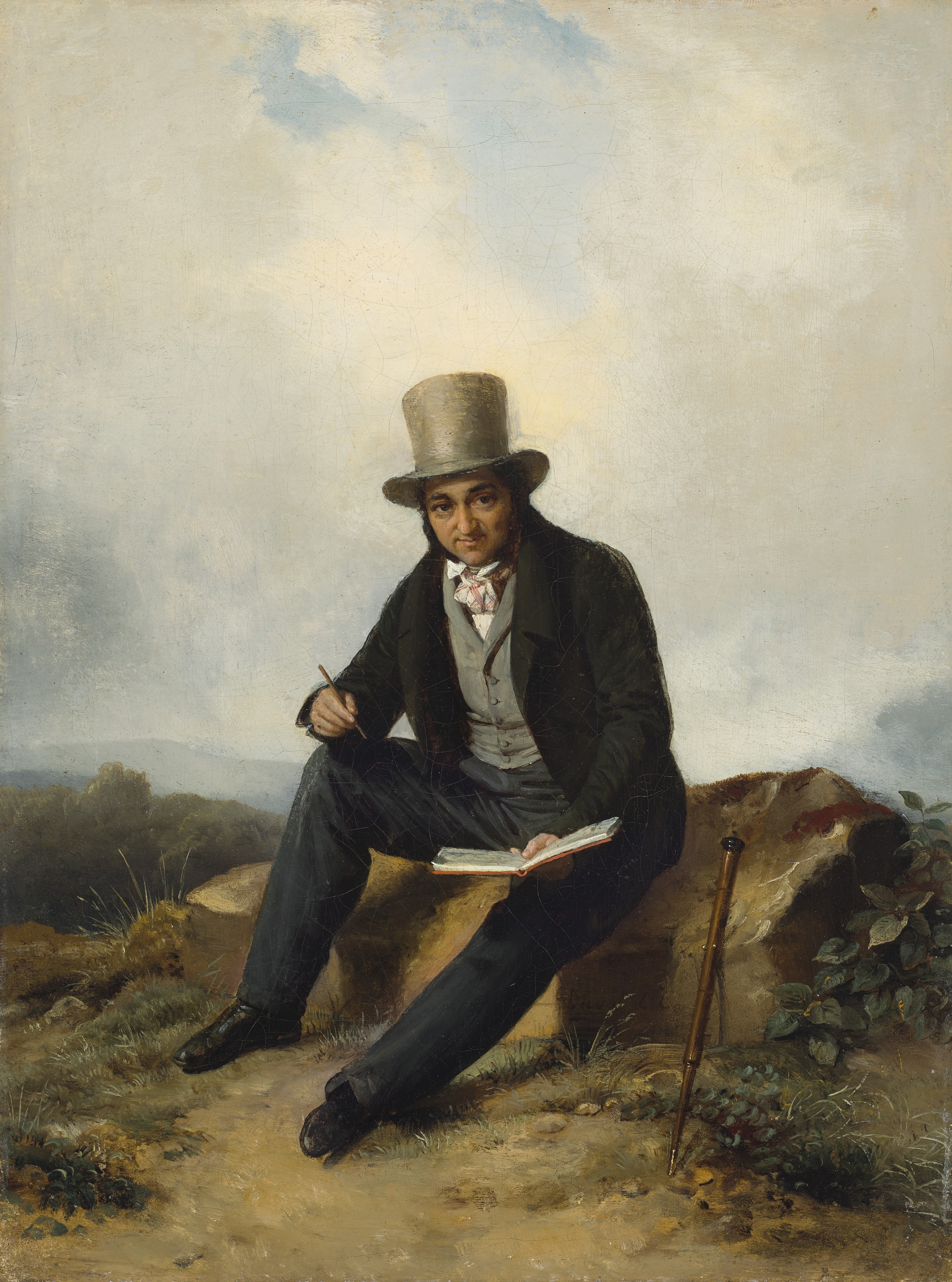
André Jolivard Seated in a Landscape; portrait by Pierre Duval le Camus

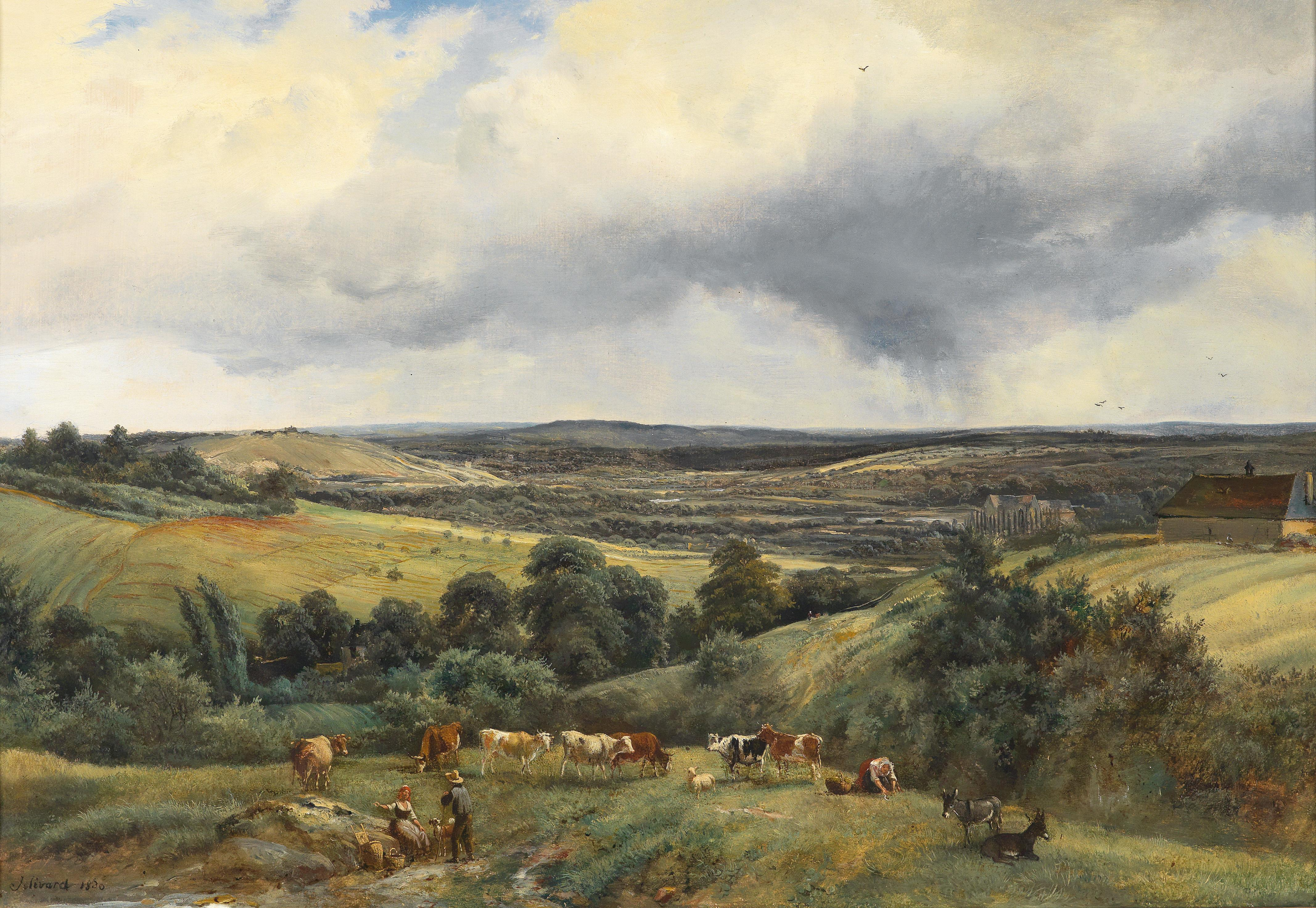
Landscape with Herd of Animals

André Jolivard (French pronunciation: [ɑ̃dʁe ʒɔlivaʁ]; 15 September 1787, in Le Mans – 8 December 1851, in Paris) was a French landscape painter.

== Biography ==
His father, Louis-Modeste Jolivard, was a merchant. He was named after his great-uncle and godfather, André Jolivard, who was a canon at the Church of Sainte-Radegonde in Poitiers.

As a young man, he rejected the provincial bourgeoisie and went to Paris to study law, but was inducted into the Third Regiment of the Imperial Guard of Honor in 1813. After seeing combat in the Battle of Leipzig, he was mustered out in 1814 and returned to his legal studies, obtaining his diploma in 1816, but he chose to pursue a career in the arts instead.

As a student of Jean-Victor Bertin, he became a popular landscape painter. He held his first exhibit at the Salon in 1819 and participated every few years until 1839; receiving a medal in 1827. He also practiced engraving and was one of the first members of the Société libre des beaux-arts de Paris. He was decorated with the Legion of Honor in 1835, the year that his painting "Farm Donkeys" was acquired by the State.

He died in 1851 as the result of an accident stemming from the Coup d'état. While opening his window, he was struck in the wrist by a stray bullet and the wound became infected with tetanus. The contents of his studio and his art collection were sold at auction and dispersed in 1852.

His works may be seen at the Musée des beaux-arts de Bordeaux, the Musée des beaux-arts de Rouen and the Musée Lambinet, among others.
