= Émile-Henri Brunner-Lacoste =

French artist

Émile-Henri Brunner-Lacoste (1838–1881) was a French classical painter, mainly of genre scenes, landscapes, still lifes and murals.

The son of German flower painter Georg Brunner (1804 - 1882), he studied under his father and worked under Eugène Lepoittevin and A. Fauré.

In 1859 he started exhibiting at the Paris Salon. Like his father, Émile Henri Brunner-Lacoste painted still lifes of flowers ("Hollyhocks") and fruit.

Brunne-Lacoste also contributed with the illustrations to Aesopian Fables by Jean de La Fontaine, such as those of "The Town Mouse and the Country Mouse".

He was also a decorative painter who worked on the Sub-Prefecture in Sceaux and on the London mansion of the Duke of Hamilton.

== Sources ==
- Michael Bryan: "Dictionary of painters and engravers", London George Bell & Sons, 1886, p. 192
- Benezit Dictionary Of Artists, Grund, 2006, V. 2, p. 1389.
