= Codazzi (surname) =

Codazzi (pronounced [koˈdattsi]) is a Northern Italian surname. Notable people with the surname include:

- Agostino Codazzi (1793–1859), Italian military, scientist, geographer and cartographer
- Alessandra Codazzi (1921–2010), Italian politician, trade unionist and partisan
- Angela Codazzi (1890–1972), Italian geographer and cartographer
- Delfino Codazzi (1824–1873), Italian mathematician
  - Codazzi tensor
  - Gauss–Codazzi equations
- Niccolò Codazzi (1642–1693), Italian painter
- Viviano Codazzi (c. 1604–1670), Italian painter

== See also ==
- Agustín Codazzi (disambiguation)
