= Jan Miel =

Flemish painter and engraver

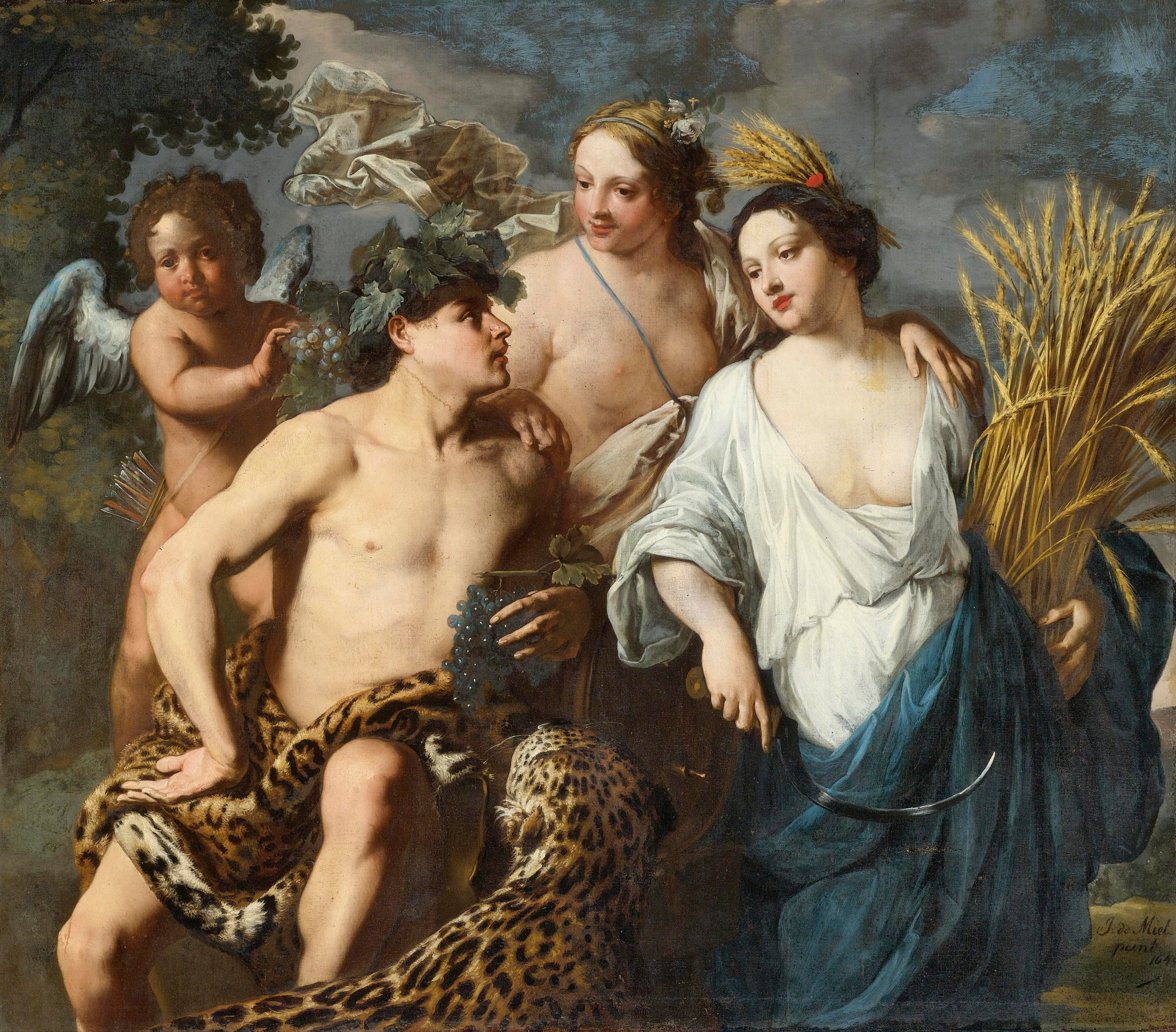
Sine Cerere et Baccho Friget Venus

Jan Miel (1599 – April 1664) was a Flemish painter and engraver who was active in Italy. He initially formed part of the circle of Dutch and Flemish genre painters in Rome who are referred to as the 'Bamboccianti' and were known for their scenes depicting the lower classes in Rome. He later developed away from the Bamboccianti style and painted history subjects in a classicising style.

He collaborated with many artists in Rome and worked in the latter part of his career in Turin as the court painter of Charles Emanuel II, the Duke of Savoy.

== Life ==
Jan Miel was probably born in Beveren-Waas, but Antwerp and 's-Hertogenbosch have also been suggested as possible birthplaces. There is no information on his training but it is assumed that it took place in Antwerp. The seventeenth century Italian biographer Giovanni Battista Passeri refers to a training by Anthony van Dyck in Flanders but there is no independent evidence for this statement.

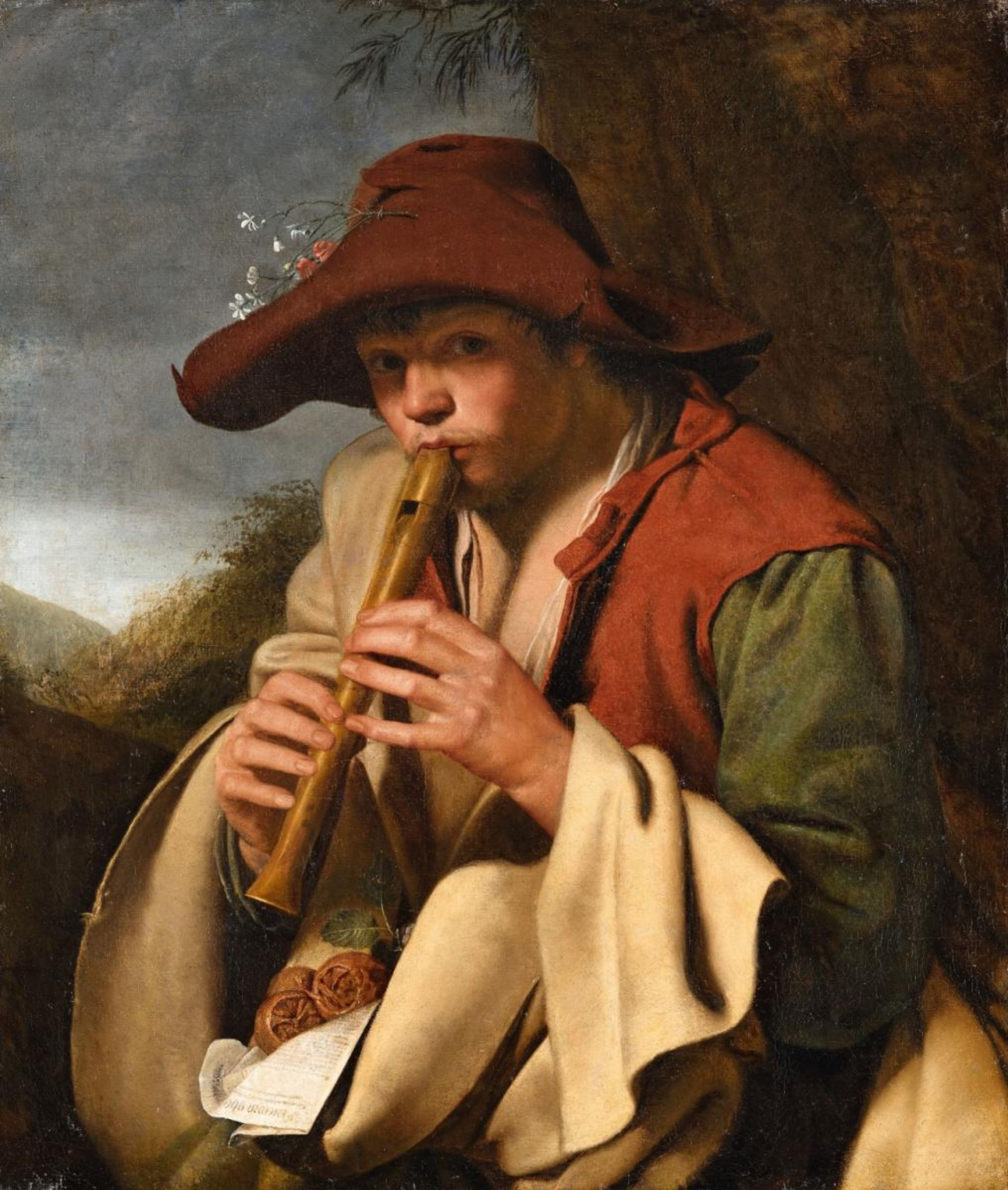
Boy playing a flute

Miel's stay in Rome in the period from 1636 to 1658 is documented, but it is possible that he was already there from 1633. In Rome, he became a member of the Bentvueghels, an association of mainly Dutch and Flemish artists working in Rome. It was customary for the Bentvueghels to adopt an appealing nickname, the so-called 'bent name'. For Miel two different bent names are documented: Bieco (which means squint in Italian) and Honingh-Bie (which means honey bee and is derived from the surname 'Miele' by which he was known in Italy and which means 'honey' in Italian).

In Rome, he also became linked to the circle of genre painters whose work was influenced by the Dutch genre painter Pieter van Laer and were referred to as 'Bamboccianti'. The Bamboccianti were mainly Dutch and Flemish artists working in Rome who mostly produced small cabinet paintings or prints of the everyday life of the lower classes in Rome and the surrounding countryside. Jan Miel was a vital force in the development of this new tradition in Rome.

Miel became in 1648 the first northern artist to be admitted to the Accademia di San Luca, a prestigious association of leading artists in Rome. A stay of Miel in Northern Italy of around 1654 is documented. From 1658 until his death he resided in Turin, where he was appointed court painter of Charles Emanuel II, the Duke of Savoy. On December 5 1663, Willem Schellinks and Jacques Thierry visited Jan Miel in Turin; Schellinks mentions in his Journal (in the Royal Library of Copenhagen) that the "Duke has gifted [Jan Miel] the Knightly Order of St Maurice and Lazarus". Miel died in Turin in 1664.

== Work ==
=== General ===
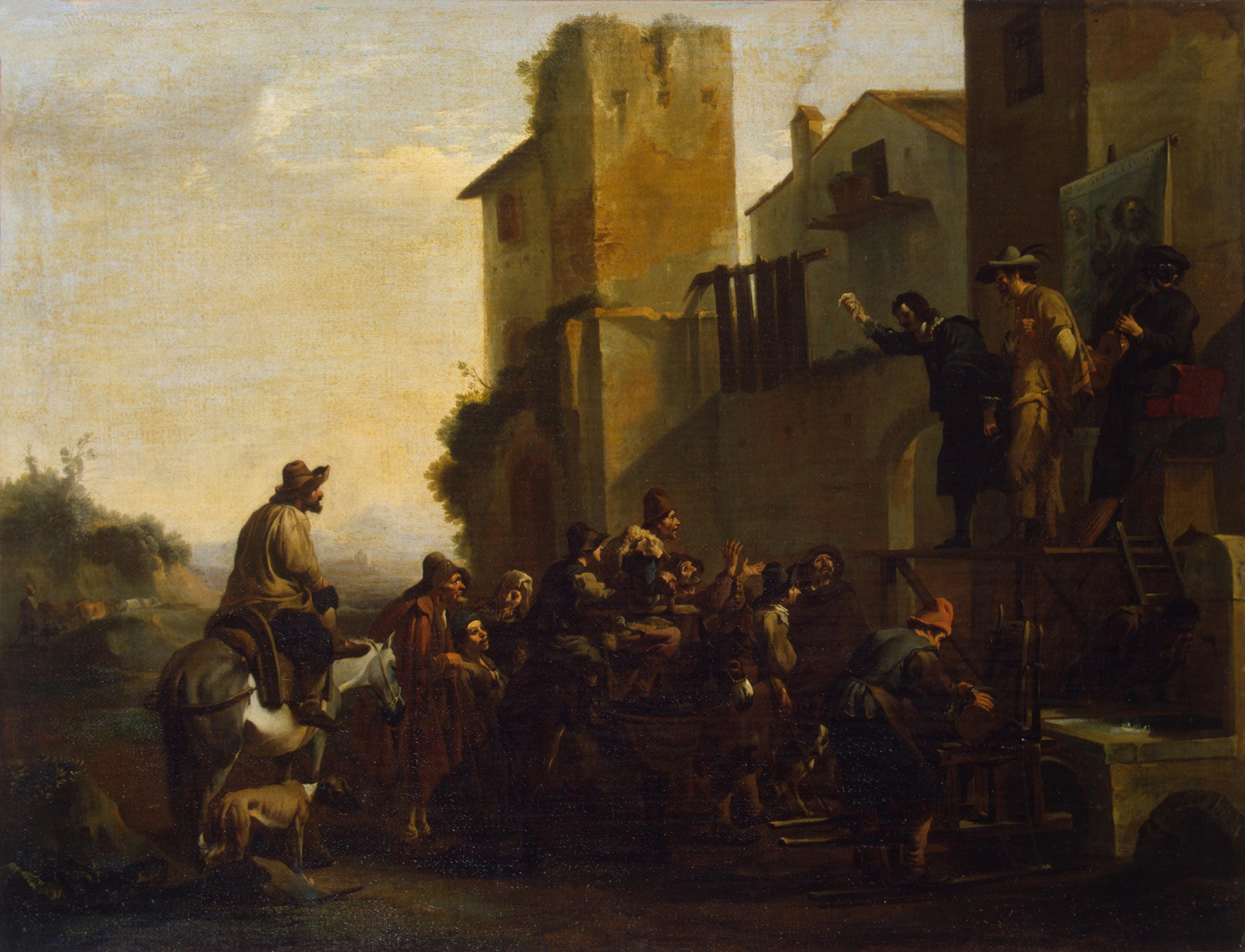
The quack

Miel's first dated paintings from the 1630s already show the influence of Pieter van Laer and the Bamboccianti in that they depict low-class subjects engaged in their normal business or at play. Popular subjects included morra players, gamblers, village dances, quacks, barbers, cobblers, itinerant musicians and actors, etc. Examples of his early work in this genre include The bowls players (Louvre) and The cobbler (Musée des Beaux-Arts et d'archéologie de Besançon), both produced in 1633. In this period he reworked and copied paintings by van Laer.

An example of a work in this so-called 'bambocciate' style is The quack (Hermitage Museum, 1650s). The composition has traditionally been interpreted as depicting an itinerant medicine peddler with his assistants, who is demonstrating to a crowd of boorish onlookers the beneficial effects of his wares. The motif of quacks was a common feature of Flemish and Dutch genre painting from the 16th century onwards. In the 16th-century Jan Sanders van Hemessen's The Surgeon had depicted a quack surgeon pretending to remove with a knife from a patient's open skull the so-called 'stone of madness'. Seventeenth-century genre painting regularly returned to the theme as can be seen in the works of Adriaen Brouwer, Jan Steen and David Teniers the Younger. The main personages in the Hermitage painting are shown dressed as characters of the commedia dell'arte: the quack wears the mask and costume of Il Dottore while the guitar player has the costume of a Zanni (madcap servant). Jan Miel painted other works using characters from the commedia dell'arte such as Carnival in Rome (Prado Museum, 1653) and The Actors' Rehearsal (Zingone collection, Rome).

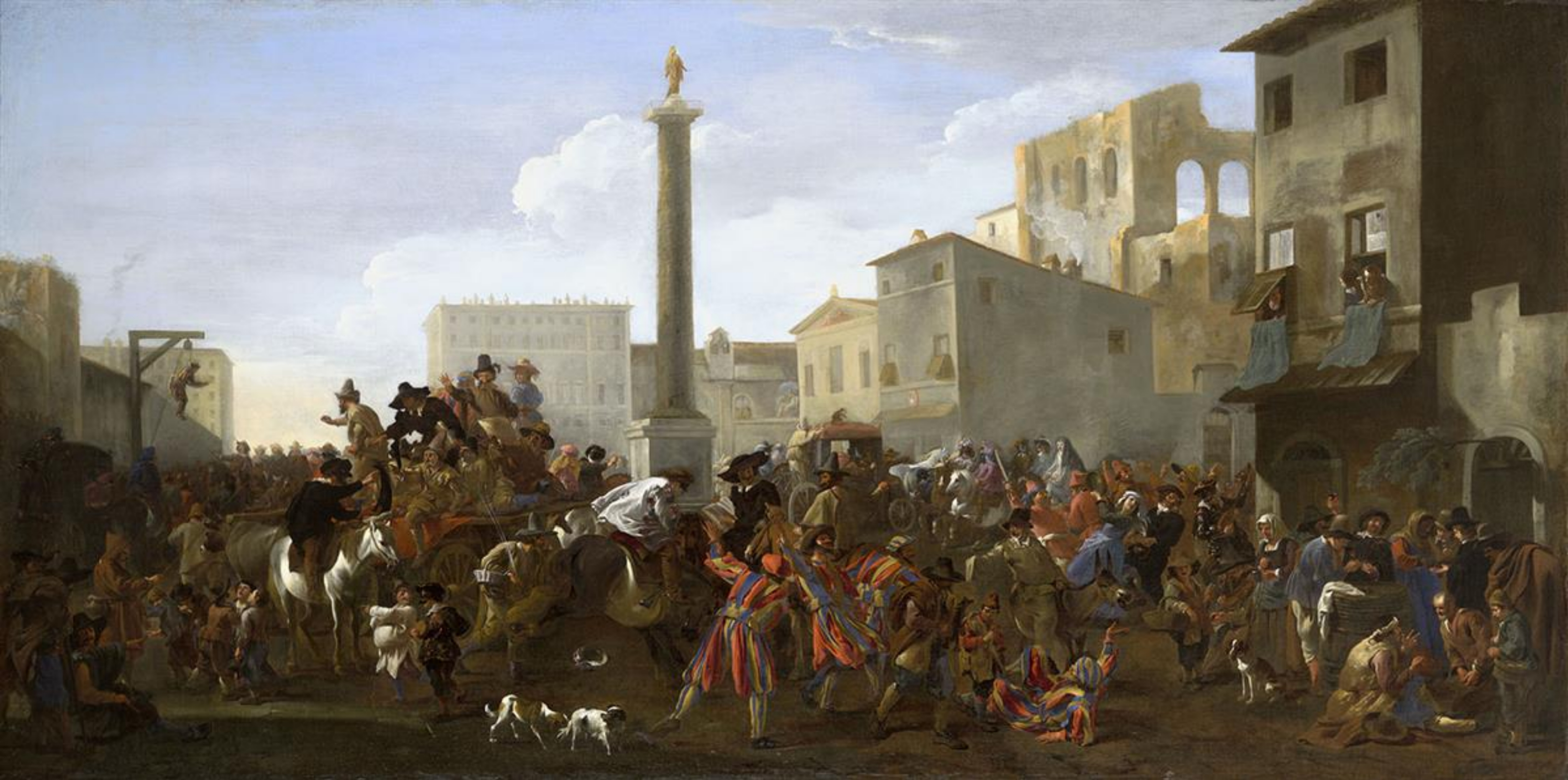
Carnival on the Piazza Colonna

During the 1640s and 1650s Miel began, just like Michelangelo Cerquozzi, to expand the scope of bambocciate paintings by paying less attention to the surrounding landscape and instead stressing the anecdotal aspects of city and country life. These works were repeatedly used as a model by the Bamboccianti in the second half of the century and by the genre painters working in Rome during the early 18th century.

Miel made his most original contribution to genre painting through his paintings of carnival scenes. An example is the Carnival on the Piazza Colonna (Wadsworth Atheneum, 1645). The painting provides a powerful representation of the fury of carnival. As is common in Miel's 'bambocciate' compositions, noble and common people appear in the same scene: the Roman nobility mounted on horseback is dossed out in elegant costumes while the common people crowd the entire square engaging in merrymaking, panhandling, the game of morra and other lowly activities. A commedia dell'arte troupe standing on a cart also participates in the revelry. The merrymaking takes place on the last day of Carnival when the excitement has reached its peak. As Carnival also announces the beginning of spring, an effigy of winter is dangling from the gallows on the left.

=== Collaborations ===
Miel often collaborated with other artists as was the custom at the time. He painted the staffage for the vedute (cityscapes or other views) by Viviano Codazzi and Alessandro Salucci and the landscapes of Gaspard Dughet and Angeluccio.

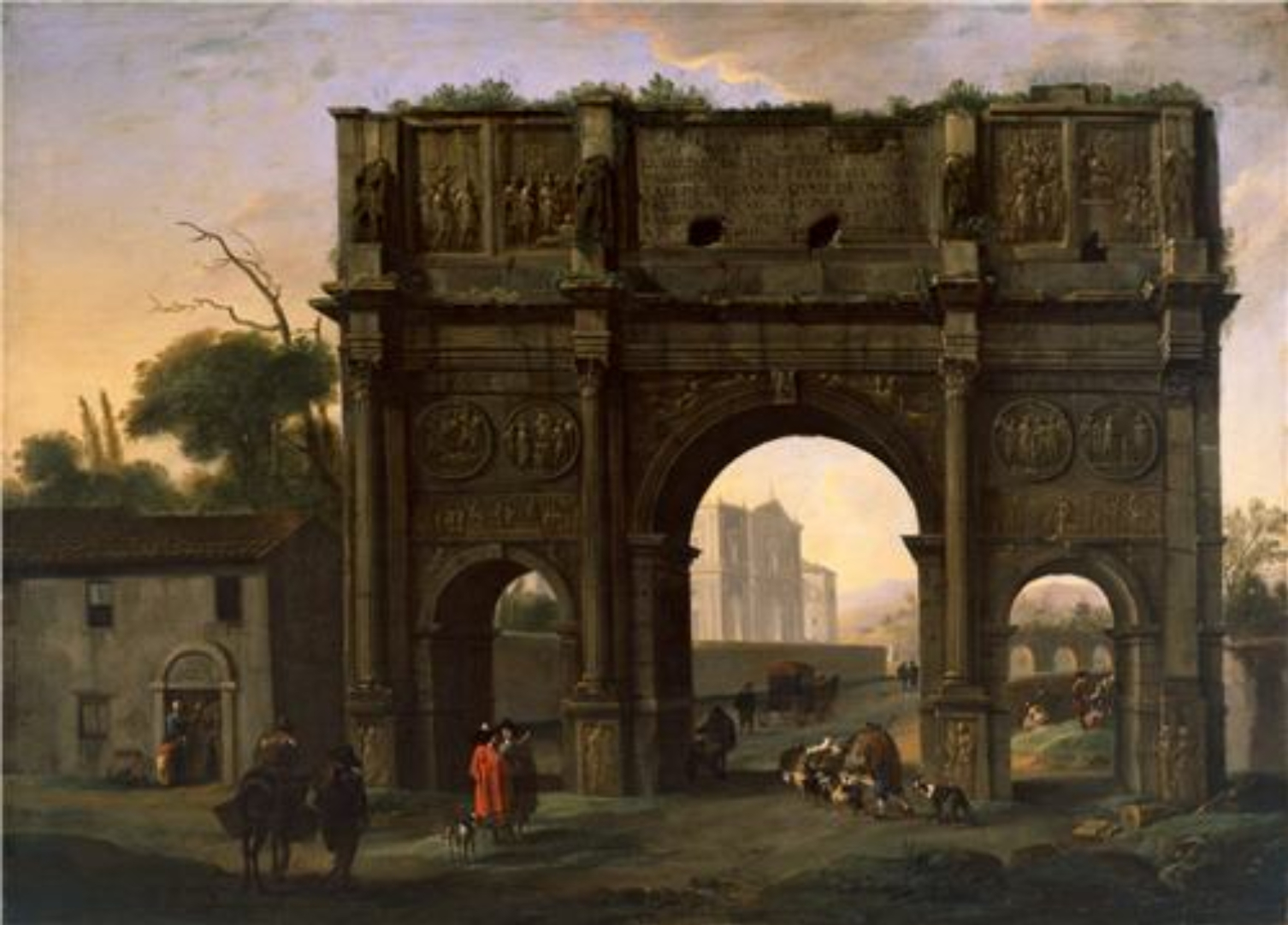
The Arch of Constantine, with Alessandro Salucci

Jan Miel worked particularly closely with Alessandro Salucci, an important innovator of veduta painting. Salucci produced many capricci, which often incorporated antique Roman monuments in imaginary environments. The collaboration between the two artists commenced in 1635 and ended when Miel left Rome for Turin in 1658 to work at the court of Charles Emmanuel II, Duke of Savoy. The only dated example of the two artists' collaborative efforts is an Imaginary Seaport (Cincinnati Art Museum), which is dated to 1656. Miel excelled in depicting stories, which filled up the open spaces in Salucci's vedute. Miel often included multiple anecdotal scenes in a single work. This is evident in An architectural capriccio with an ionic portico, a fountain, a two-story loggia, a Gothic palace and figures on a quay (Christie's, Sale 1708, Lot 56). This composition depicts various groups of people acting independently of each other: there are an elegant couple on the lower left on the stairs, figures at the well next to them and card players on the steps in the distance. Miel's figures were typically farmers, beggars, morra players, innkeepers and porters often mixed with elegantly dressed men and women, who provided a rich flavor of Roman daily life to the architectural setting created by Salucci.

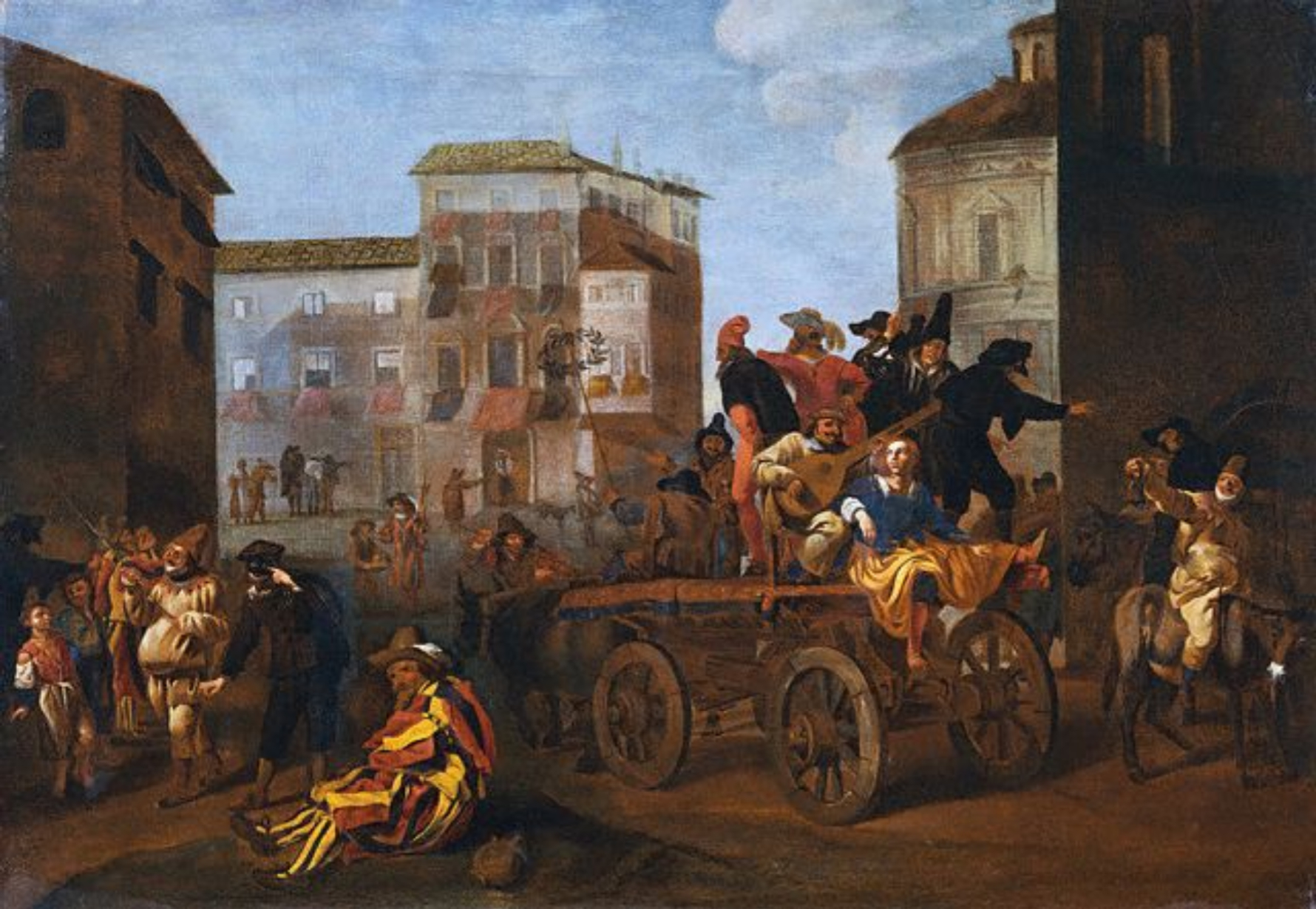
Actors from the Commedia dell’Arte on a Wagon in a Town Square

There is evidence that in 1641, Jan Miel was documented in the studio of Andrea Sacchi. This collaboration is rather exceptional since Sacchi was an important critic of the Bambocciante style of which Miel was an important representative. This stay in Sacchi's studio may have been instrumental in the artist's evolutions towards the "gran maniera" of painting. Miel worked with Andrea Sacchi on the painting Urban VIII visits the Church of the Gesù (Galleria Barberini, Rome, 1641). It is believed that Sacchi only executed a small portion of the painting himself and that Jan Miel executed the foreground figures after drawings by Sacchi.

Old auction catalogues mentioned that Miel contributed the staffage to the landscapes of Claude Lorrain during his stay in Rome, but it has not been possible to attribute the human figures in Lorrain's works to Miel.

=== Later evolution ===
Around 1650, he began to paint less bambocciate and to concentrate on religious paintings for Roman churches executed in a large format. There are a number of works from the 1650s in this more dignified style such as an altarpiece of The Madonna and Child with Saints in the Duomo di Santa Maria della Scala in Chieri dating from 1651. At the same time, Miel also created small paintings with religious subjects. These works were commissioned by eminent patrons from Rome such as the Barberini family. His work also showed a tendency towards classicism as is evidenced by his Dido and Aeneas (Musée des Beaux-Arts de Cambrai).

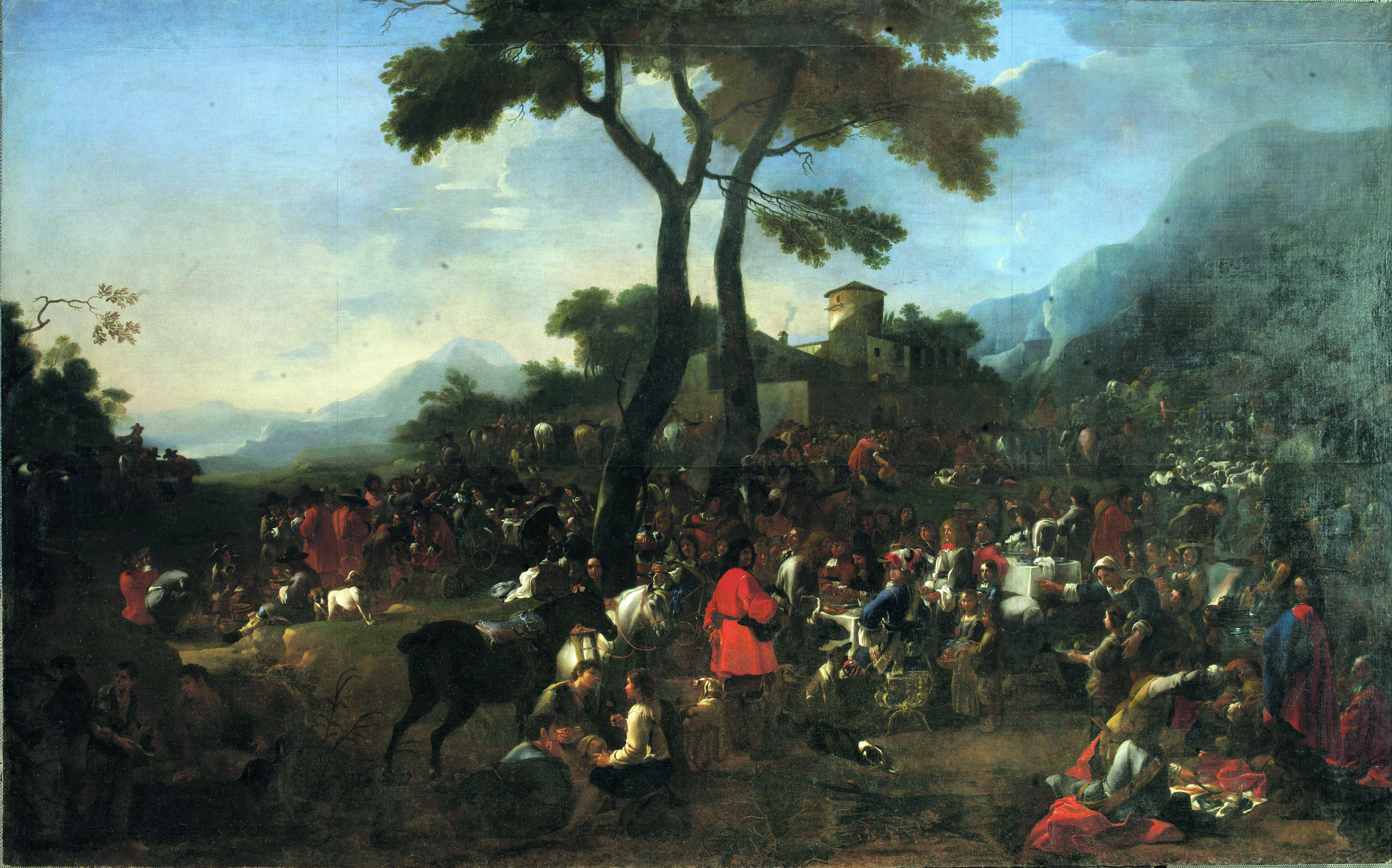
Gathering of the hunters

After moving to Turin in 1658, he decorated the royal hunting lodge at Venaria Reale with large-scale hunting scenes (portions of which are now lost). He painted more and more history paintings which demonstrate an intensification of the classical tendencies already present in the religious paintings of the 1650s. Miel also began to study and copy the works of Raphael and Annibale Carracci, just as he had copied the works of Pieter van Laer at the beginning of his career.

=== Prints ===
Miel was also a skilled engraver. He designed the frontispiece for La povertà contenta (Rome, 1650) of Daniello Bartoli and the illustrations for De bello belgico (Rome, 1647) of Famiano Strada.
