= Alessandro Salucci =

Italian painter

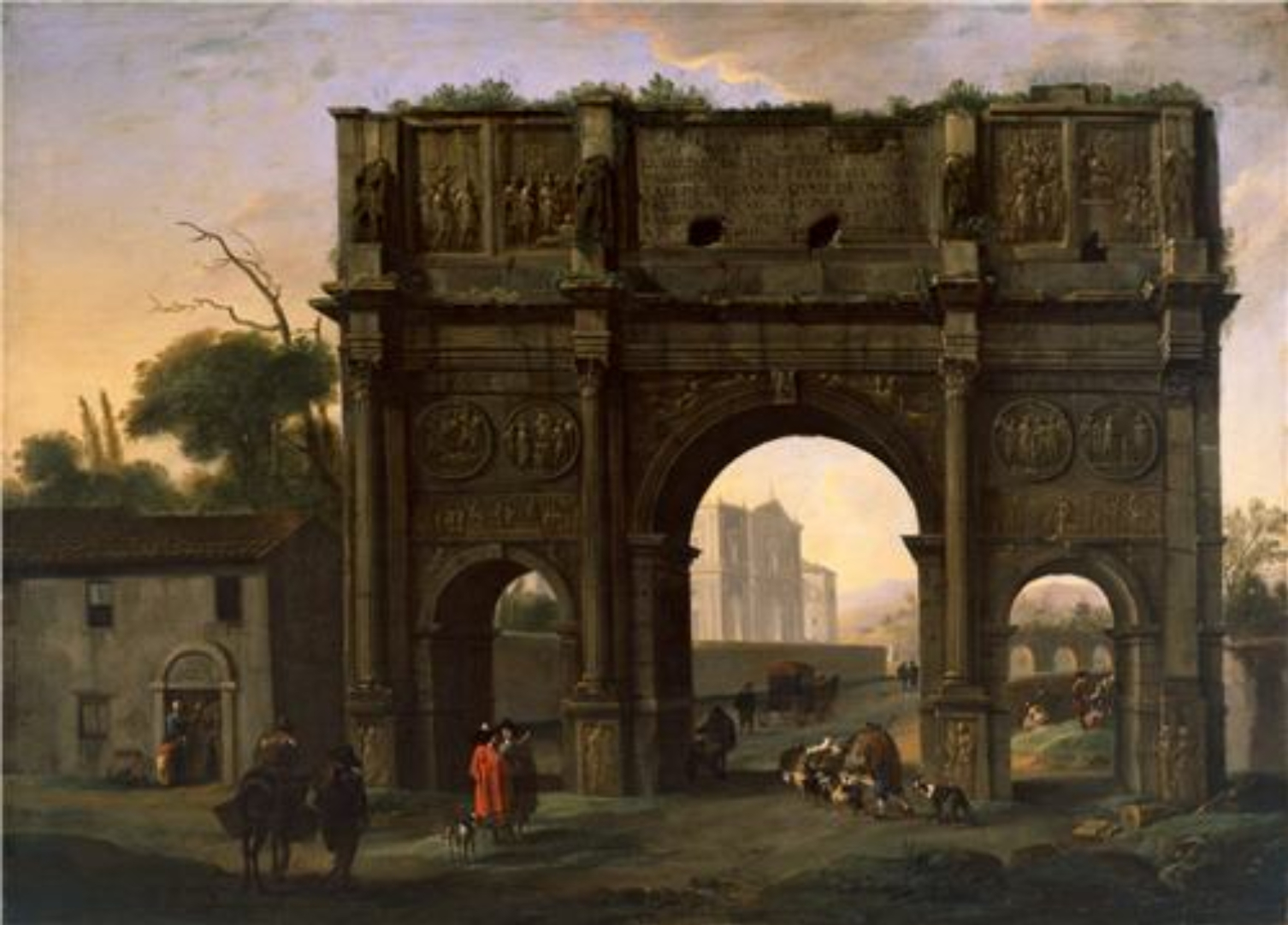
Arch of Constantine, Rome, with Jan Miel

Alessandro Salucci (1590 – c. 1655–60) was an Italian painter who played an important role in the development of the genre of cityscapes (vedute) of Rome. He created capricci, i.e. imaginary architectural perspectives and harbour views, in which the figures were often executed by another artist.

== Life ==
Very little is known about Alessandro Salucci's early life and training. He is believed to have been born in Florence in 1590. The first written record of the artist dates from 1628 when he is mentioned in connection with other artists in Rome. Salucci completed important public and private commissions in Rome.

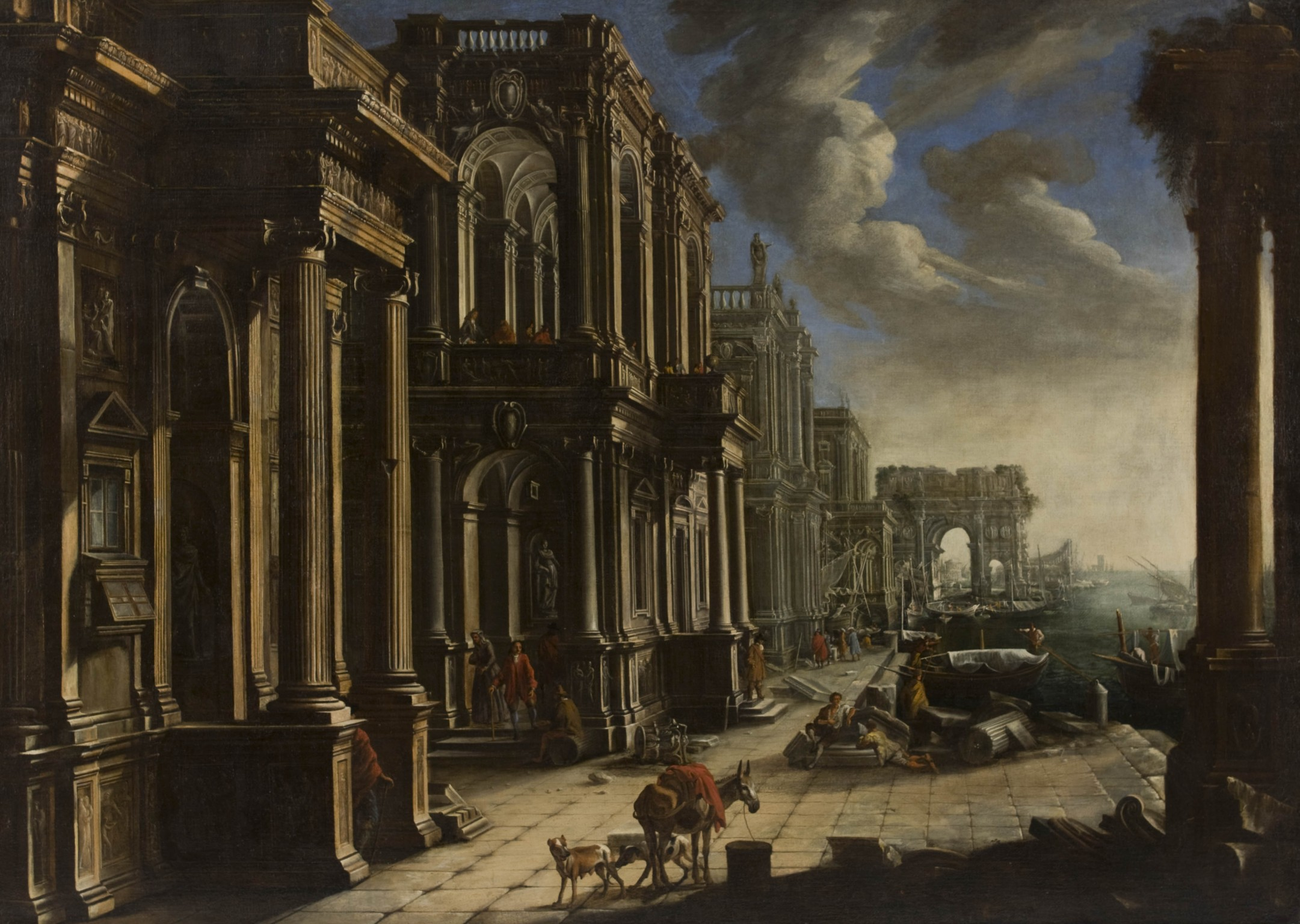
View with architecture, triumphal arch and figures

In 1628 he made frescos in the castle of the Sacchetti family (the 'Casino Sacchetti', now 'Casino Chigi') in Castelfusano, working alongside Andrea Sacchi and Pietro da Cortona. In 1634 Salucci became member of the Roman Accademia di San Luca (the "Academy of Saint Luke").

In 1635 he worked in the Santa Maria in Vallicella (also known as the 'Chiesa Nuova') where in the Chapel of the Presentation of Our Lady he painted fresco's on the vault, depicting the story of Hannah, Elkanah and the young Samuel. His fresco's were painted over the decorations made by Domenico de Coldie in 1590.

He began to collaborate with Jan Miel, a Flemish history and genre painter residing in Rome, around 1635. Many of their collaborative paintings have been preserved to this day, for the most part in private collections. He collaborated in a similar way with Michelangelo Cerquozzi. A few compositions painted in collaboration with Johannes Lingelbach are also known.

Salucci also got to know Viviano Codazzi, another painter of architectural paintings who had worked in Naples until 1647 and then moved to Rome. He clearly also was familiar with the work of the landscape artist Claude Lorrain then working in Rome. In 1647-48 he painted a major cycle of frescoes in the Church of Sant’Elisabetta dei Fornari, which was destroyed in 1889.

Salucci died, probably in Rome, after 1650.

== Work ==
=== General ===
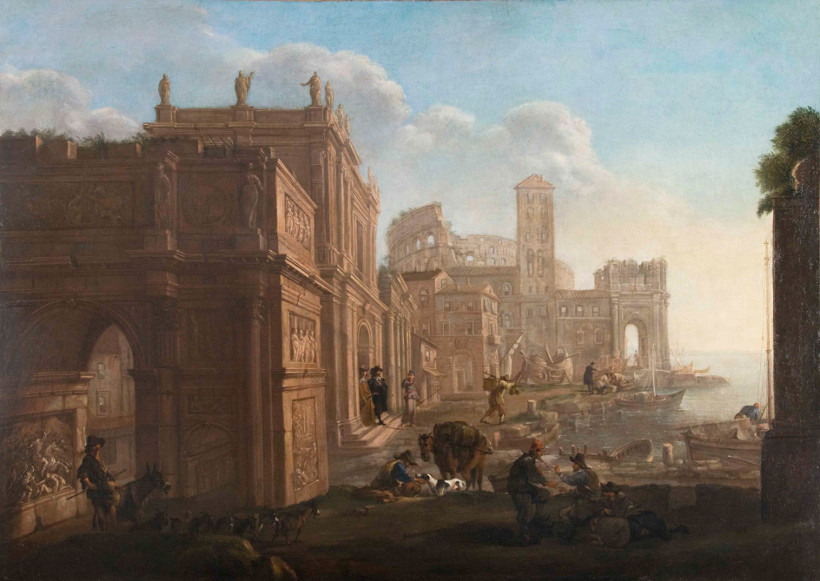
Architectural capriccio depicting the Arch of Constantine, the Colosseum and Santa Maria in Cosmedin, with Jan Miel

Alessandro Salucci is regarded as one of the significant early exponents of the genre of the veduta. The type of decorative architectural paintings that Salucci created represent a form that became popular in mid-17th century Rome. Art historians interpret the growing popularity of the architectural piece in 17th century Italy as the result of a shift of patronage from 'committente' to 'acquirente', that is, from painting on commission to painting on the open market. Architectural canvases were particularly welcome within the typical 17th-century decorative ensemble, where walls were completely covered with paintings of various types and sizes. The architectural piece lent variety to such ensembles by introducing the strong verticals and horizontals of its subject matter.

The roots of this type of vedute can be found in 16th-century painting, and in particular in the architectural settings that were painted as the framework of large-scale frescoes and ceiling decorations known as quadrature. These architectural elements gained prominence in 17th-century painting to become stand-alone subjects of easel paintings.

A number of artists practiced this genre. Viviano Codazzi was an important contemporary practitioner of the genre whose work influenced Salucci. Codazzi's vedute where, however, more realistic in nature than those of Salucci who showed more creativity and fantasy in his works in which he rearranged many Roman monuments with elegance. Salucci preferred a lighter palette and removed thereby any dramatization.

Unlike the Flemish and Dutch artists active in Rome who strived for realism in their depictions of Roman cityscapes, many of Salucci's city and harbour views do not aim to give a realist rendering of his subjects. His views tend to mix antique monuments in Rome with fantasy elements, and thus resemble more "capricci". The antique structures in his compositions are not recorded in archeological detail but are solely used for decorative effect. Salucci's compositions are generally composed of a Roman arcade dominating the centre on the left, water in the distance on the right, and figures in the foreground. He also often included in his views a portico with paired columns and pedestals and a double-story loggia.

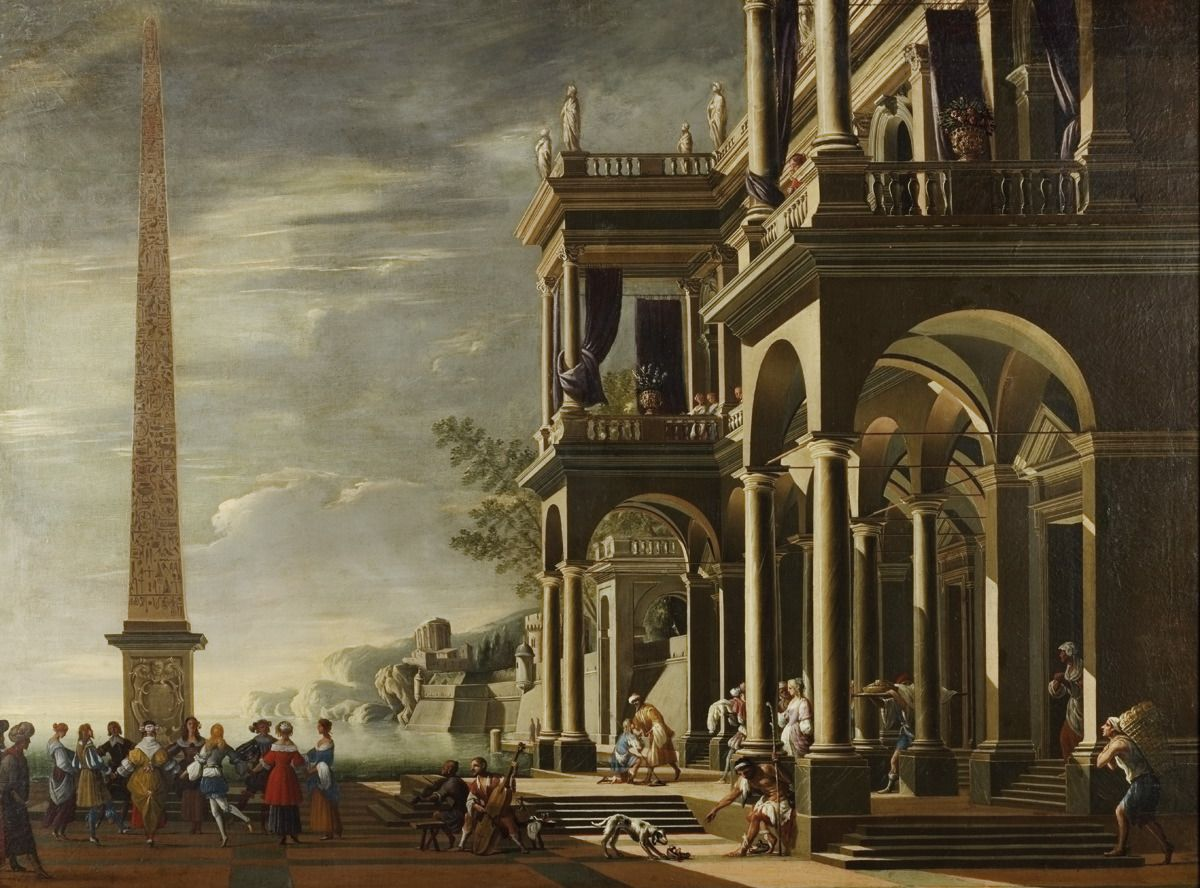
Capriccio

Salucci's work reveals an awareness of the classical marine views of Claude Lorrain, who was active in Rome in the 1640s and 1650s. Claude's warm, golden light and balanced compositional structure are found in Salucci's works such as the Fantasy view with figures (Busiri-Vici collection, Rome) which was likely inspired by Claude's port views, such as Seaport with the Embarkation of the Queen of Sheba of 1648 (National Gallery, London).

=== Collaborations ===
Salucci often collaborated with specialist figure painters who painted the staffage in his architectural compositions. Collaborations with Jan Miel, Michelangelo Cerquozzi and Johannes Lingelbach have been recorded. These three collaborators all painted in the bambocciante style pioneered by the Dutch painter Pieter van Laer. The bamboccianti had brought existing traditions of depicting 'low-life' subjects from Dutch and Flemish Renaissance painting with them to Italy and created small-scale depictions of the lower classes in Rome and its countryside.

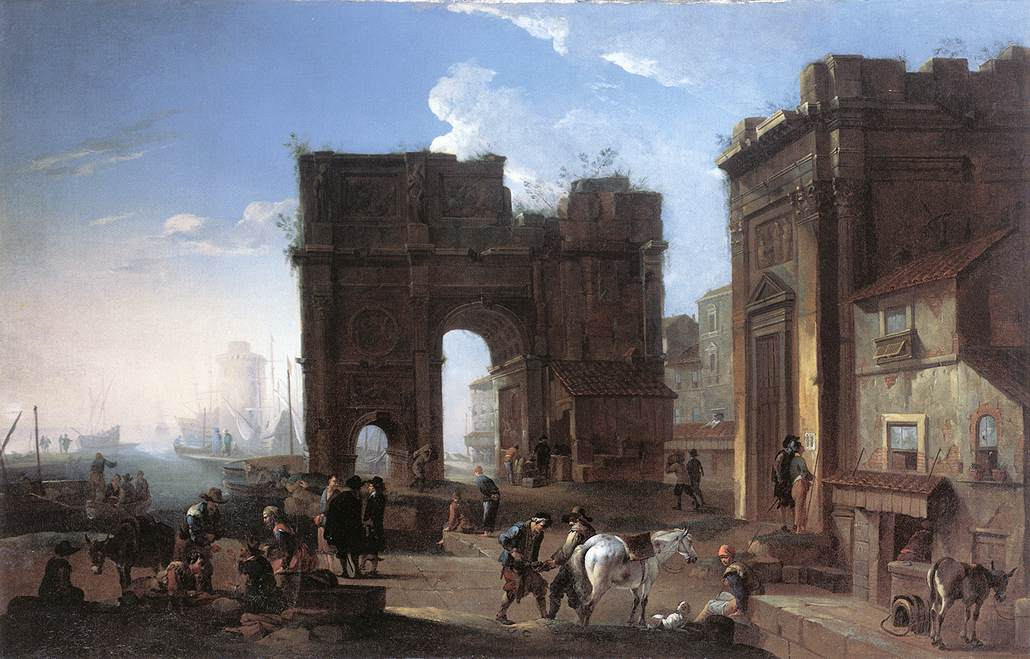
Harbour View with Triumphal Arch, with Jan Miel

Jan Miel was Salucci's most frequent collaborator, a collaboration, which commenced in 1635 and ended when Miel left Rome for Turin in 1658 to work at the court of Charles Emmanuel II, Duke of Savoy. The only dated example of the two artists' collaborative efforts is an Imaginary Seaport (Cincinnati Art Museum), which is dated to 1656.

Miel excelled in depicting stories for which the large open spaces in Salucci's view paintings provided suitable settings. Miel often included multiple anecdotal scenes in a single work. This is evident in An architectural capriccio with an ionic portico, a fountain, a two story loggia, a Gothic palace and figures on a quay (Christie's, Sale 1708, Lot 56) where the elegant couple on the lower left on the stairs of the portico are acting separately from the figures at the well next to them, while the latter figures, in turn, are oblivious to the card players on the steps further back. Miel's figures were typically farmers, beggars, morra players, innkeepers and porters often mixed with elegantly dressed men and women, thus providing a rich flavor of Roman daily life to the architectural setting created by Salucci.
