= Vicente Giner =

Spanish painter (1636–1681)

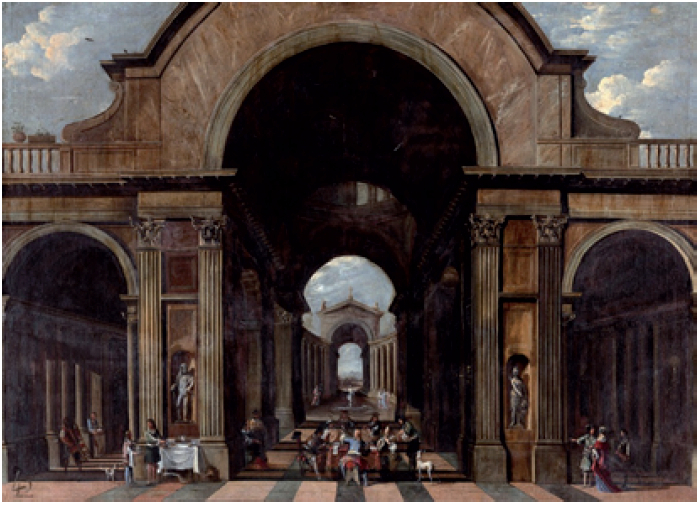
Interior of a basilica with musicians in concert around a table. Vicente Giner / oil on canvas / 121 x 167 cm. / 1660-1681 / Museu de Belles Arts de València.

Vicente Giner (c. 1636-1681) was a Spanish canon and painter of architectural paintings, capricci and vedute, who was active in Rome. He was a frequent collaborator of the prominent architectural painter Viviano Codazzi in Rome.

== Life ==
Vicente Giner was born around 1636 in the town of Castéllon de la Plana, near Valencia. Here he studied painting and also became a Catholic priest.

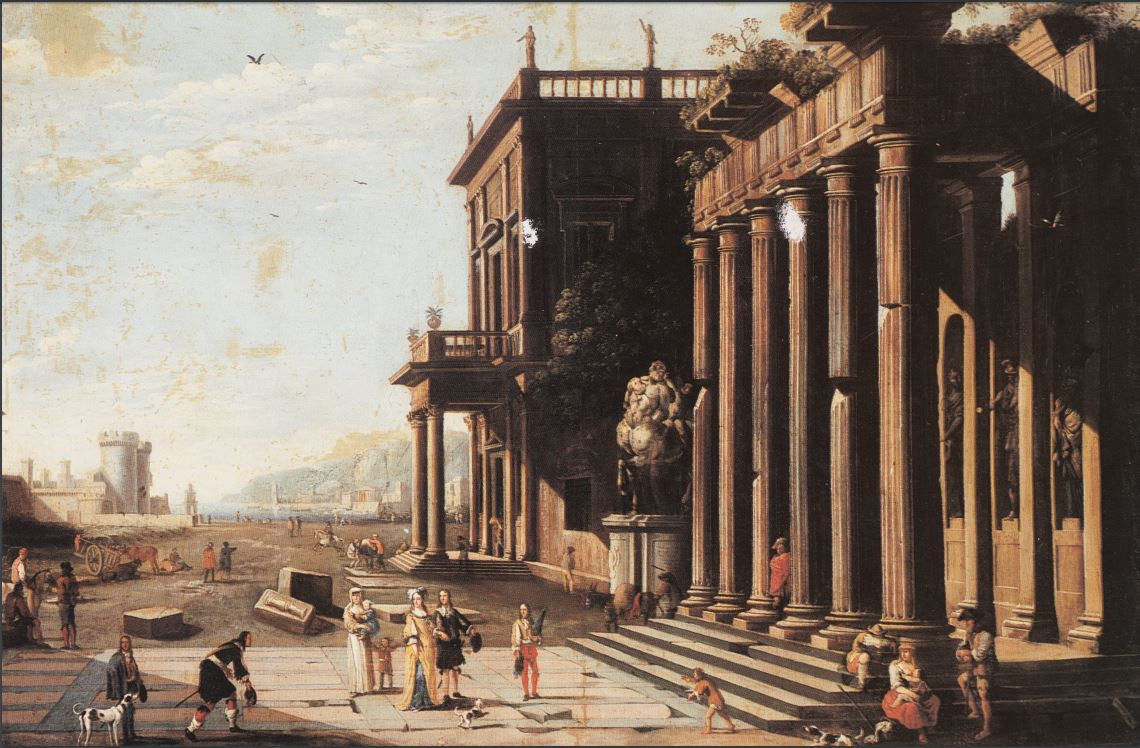
A capriccio view of a palace with ruins and figures. Vicente Giner / oil on canvas / 1660-1681.

Vicente Giner was already in Rome in May 1672, as at that time he is recorded granting his nephew José Giner a general power to sell on his behalf any of his assets. His nephew, the son of a brother of unknown name, appears on the document as absent. This is regarded as evidence that at the time he had already left Spain and was therefore granting his nephew full authority to manage his estate in Spain. Giner stated that at the time he was living at a house in the Roman administrative district of Campo Marzio.

Giner was closely linked with and possibly studied with the prominent architectural painter Viviano Codazzi who had moved to Rome from Naples in 1648. He possibly painted figures in the architectural compositions of Codazzi. He also painted the figures for Codazzi's son Niccolò while the latter worked in his father's studio. This collaboration is evidenced by the Saint Peter Baptizing the centurion and the Arch of Titus (At Jean-François Heim).

In 1680 the artist lived in the Via Gregoriana. In that year, he was one of the leading signatories, together with fellow artist Sebastián Muñoz, of a petition from a group of Spanish painters directed to Gaspar Méndez de Haro, 7th Marquis of Carpio, the Spanish Ambassador to Rome. This petition requested that an Academy for Spanish artists, along the lines of the French academy, be created in Rome with the celebrated painter Francisco Herrera the Younger as its director. The Ambassador who was himself one of Europe’s most important art collectors at that time, received the request with great pleasure. The request was rejected by the Spanish Crown stating insufficiency of funds at that time.

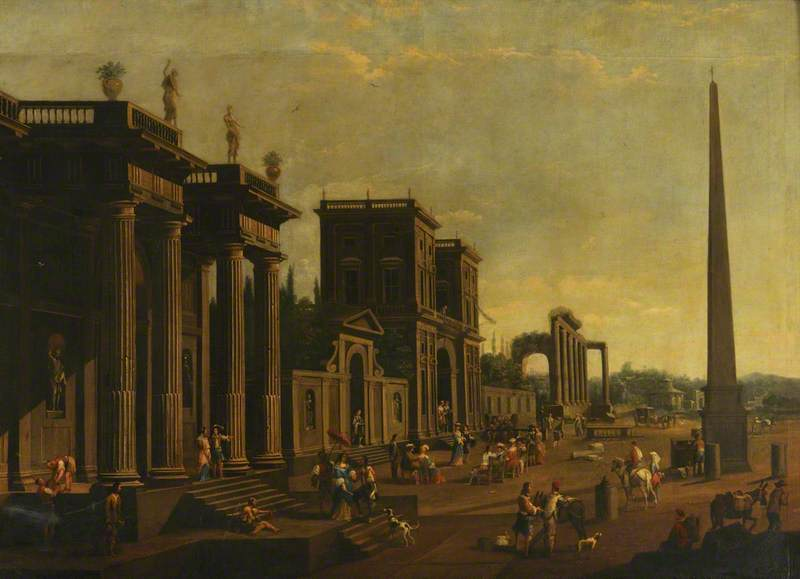
An architectural capriccio with figures and an obelisk. Vicente Giner / oil on canvas / 129.5 × 203 cm. / 1660-1681 / Vyne Estate, Hampshire (accredited museum).

He died on 5 September 1681 and was buried in the neighboring parish of Sant Andrea delle Fratte.

== Work ==
The work of Vicente Giner is still relatively unexplored. To date only about a dozen works have been attributed to him. Signed paintings by him are even rarer. The signed Perspective with port is in the collection of the Bank of Spain's collection and another signed Interior of a basilica with musicians in concert around a table in the Museu de Belles Arts de València.

Giner specialised in painting large and dramatic architectural compositions animated by numerous figures. His works depict monumental buildings, monuments and ruins from Antiquity. The artist did not strive to depict existing scenes realistically but combined existing and imaginary elements to arrive at a balanced composition.

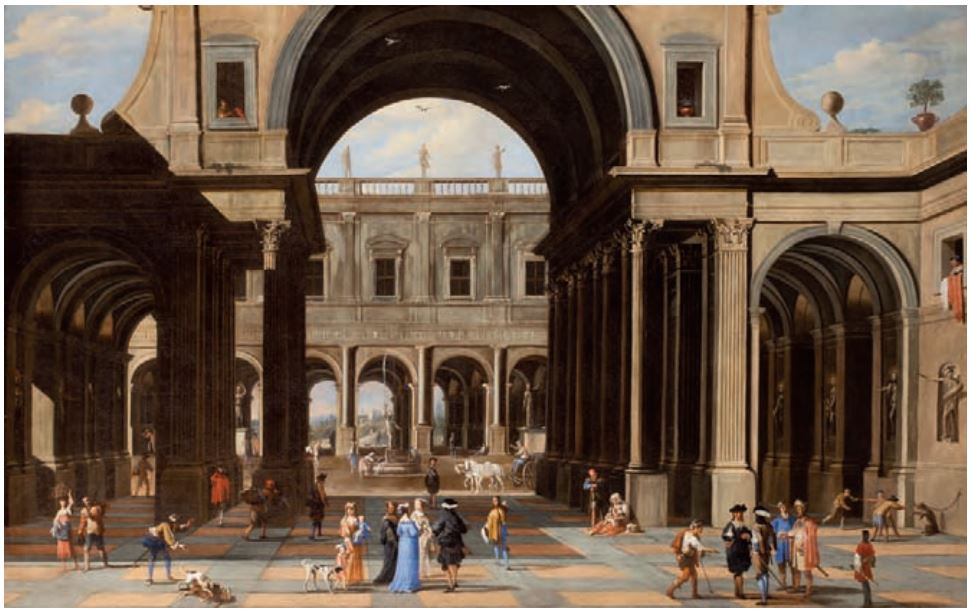
An Italianate palace interior with carriages and elegant figures. Vicente Giner / oil on canvas / 117.5 x 183 cm. / 1660-1681 / Rafael Valls collection in 2014.

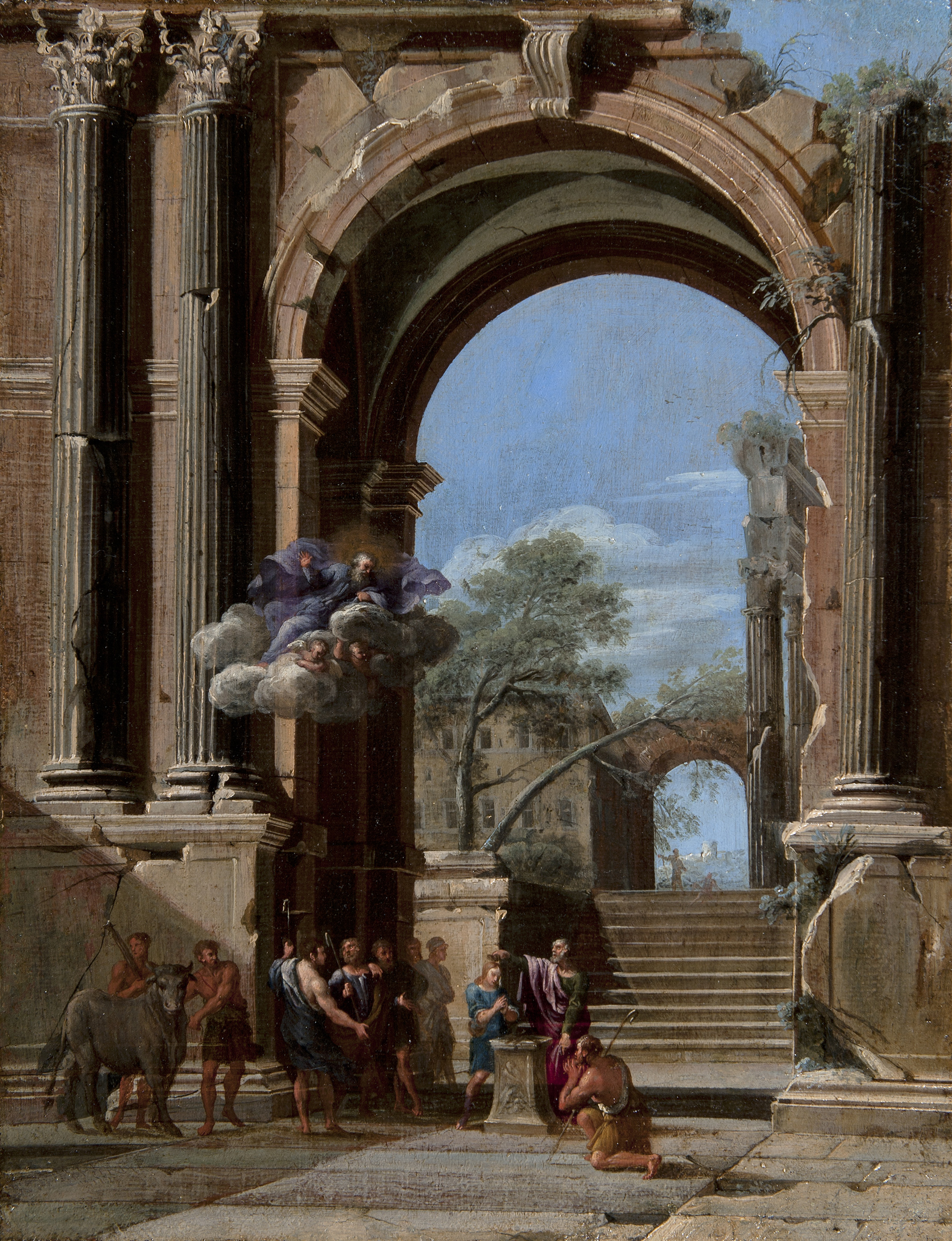
Saint Peter baptizing the centurion and the Arch of Titus. Vicente Giner with architectural rendering by Niccolò Codazzi / oil on canvas / 43 × 33 cm. / 1660-1693 / Jean-François Heim collection.

He was evidently inspired by the work of his contemporary Viviano Codazzi. Giner may have worked in Codazzi's workshop and they collaborated on a number of occasions although there is no documentary evidence to support this. Some of his paintings were formerly attributed to Viviano Codazzi, including the Architectural Capriccio with Figures and an Obelisk and the Architectural Capriccio (both in the collections of the National Trust). The re-attribution of the latter was made by art historian David Marshall in 1987 who argued that the composition was clearly dependent upon Codazzi's paintings of the 1660s, but was executed in a flatter, dull and less precise manner. The figures were painted clearly by another hand from that of the painter of the architecture.

His compositions often include figures which represent a religious scene but without attempting to depict a particular biblical episode. As is the case with Viviano Codazzi, several of compositions also include daily scenes in which elegantly dressed personages appear together with simply dressed common people. This shows his debt to the genre works of the group of genre painters active in Rome and known as the Bamboccianti who depicted Roman scenes with ordinary people. The careful physiognomies and gestures of his figures also show his familiarity with the figures of Cornelis de Wael and Pandolfo Reschi. His compositions regularly used compositional and architectonical schemes borrowed from Viviano Codazzi.

== Other projects ==
Media related to Vicente Giner at Wikimedia Commons
