= Viviano Codazzi =

Italian painter (c. 1604 – 1670)

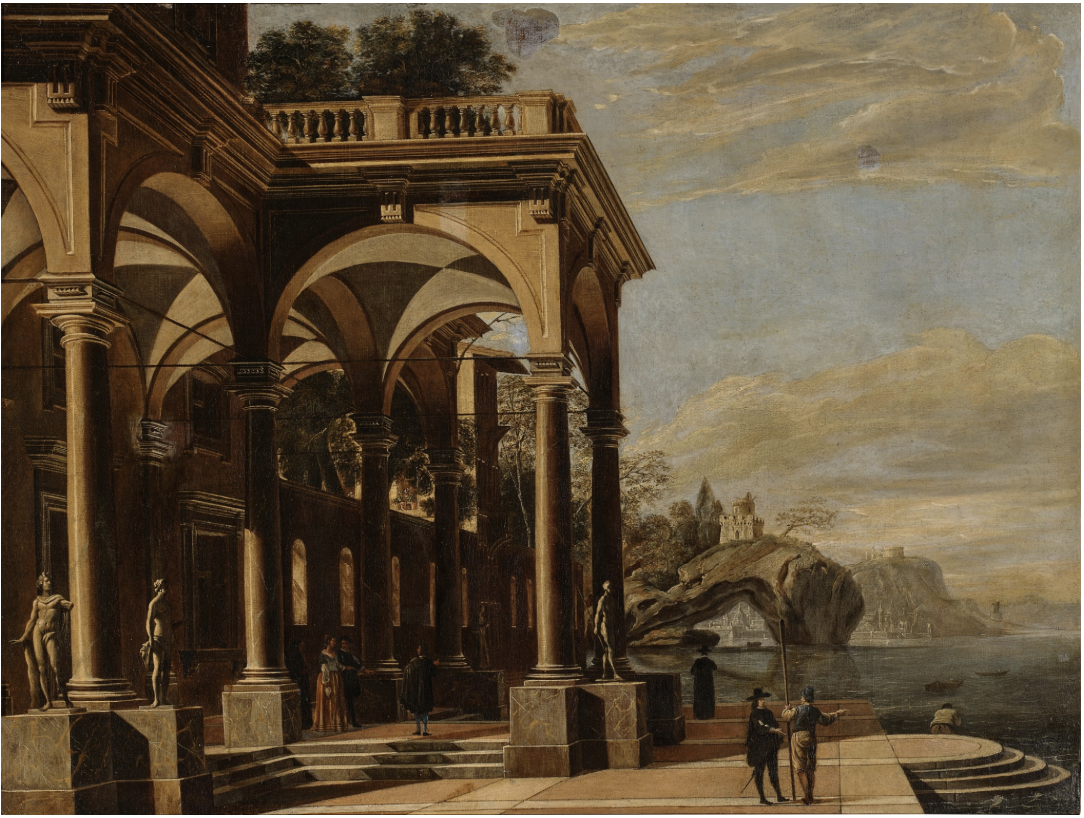
An architectural capriccio with figures by a colonnaded portico, a castle on a sea arch and coastal village beyond, c. 1660

Viviano Codazzi (c. 1604 – 5 November 1670) was an Italian architectural painter who was active during the Baroque period. He is known for his architectural paintings, capricci, compositions with ruins, and some vedute. He worked in Naples and Rome. He is known in older sources as Viviano Codagora or il Codagora.

== Life ==
Viviano Codazzi was born in Valsassina near Bergamo around 1604. His family relocated to Rome by 1605.

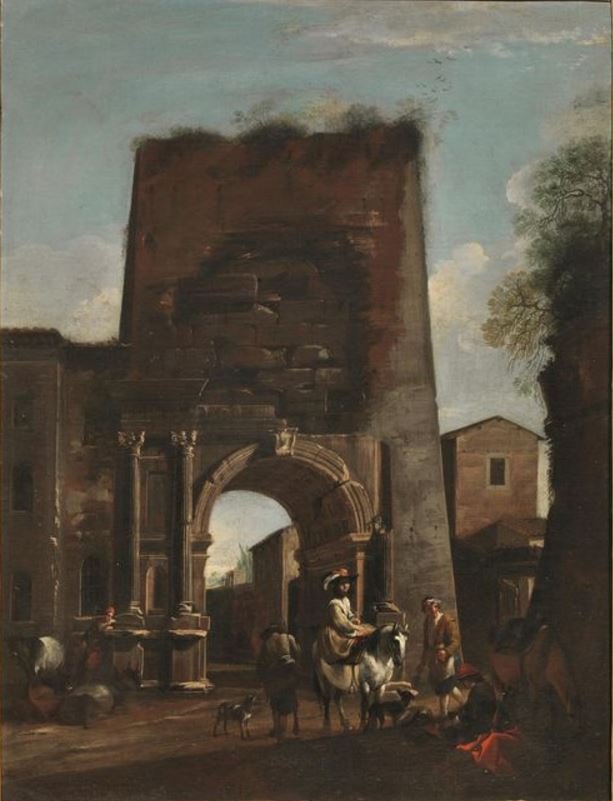
View of the Arch of Titus with horsemen at rest, figures by Jan Miel

Viviano most likely trained in Rome. He had moved by 1633 to Naples where he worked on commissions at the Certosa di San Martino resulting from his connections with his fellow Bergamasque Cosimo Fanzago. A major commission in Naples was a series of four large canvases representing ancient Roman scenes (including one depicting gladiatorial combats in the Colosseum) for the Buen Retiro in Madrid, with figures by Domenico Gargiulo. Codazzi was a painter of architecture and the figures in his compositions were always painted in by specialist figure painters. In Naples his principal collaborator for the figures was Gargiulo. The artist married on 3 May 1636 Candida Miranda, from Naples. The couple had seven children of whom Niccolò and Antonio became painters.

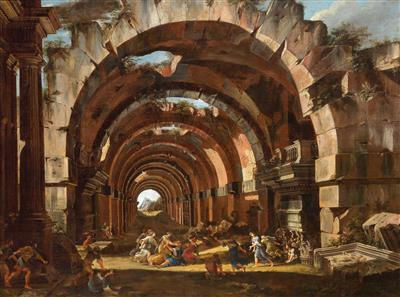
Arches in ruins and Hecuba’s vengeance over Polymestor

After relocating to Rome following the revolt of Masaniello in 1647, he collaborated with painters from the circle of mainly Dutch and Flemish painters active in Rome who were known as the Bamboccianti. His most frequent collaborators were Michelangelo Cerquozzi and Jan Miel. He further collaborated with Filippo Lauri, Adriaen van der Cabel and Vicente Giner during the 1660s. Artemisia Gentileschi relied on Viviano Codazzi to paint in the architectural backgrounds in a number of her paintings. An example of such collaboration is the Bathsheba in the Columbus Museum of Art.

Codazzi had several close followers, including Ascanio Luciano and Andrea di Michele in Naples, his son Niccolò Codazzi (1642–1693), Vicente Giner ( a native of Spain), and Domenico Roberti. In Northern Europe, artists such as Wilhelm Schubert van Ehrenberg, Jacobus Ferdinandus Saey, Jacob Balthasar Peeters, Antoon Gheringh and Jan Baptist van der Straeten were also influenced or inspired by his work.

Viviano's son, Nicolo (Naples, 1642 - Genoa, 1693) was a painter of architectural paintings and capricci like his father. Another son called Antonio was also a painter but his work is not well known.

Despite his intense artistic activity Viviano Codazzi was registered as poor in 1657. He resided in Rome except for brief absences (around 1653 and possibly between 1659 and 1666) until his death in Rome on 5 November 1670.

== Work ==
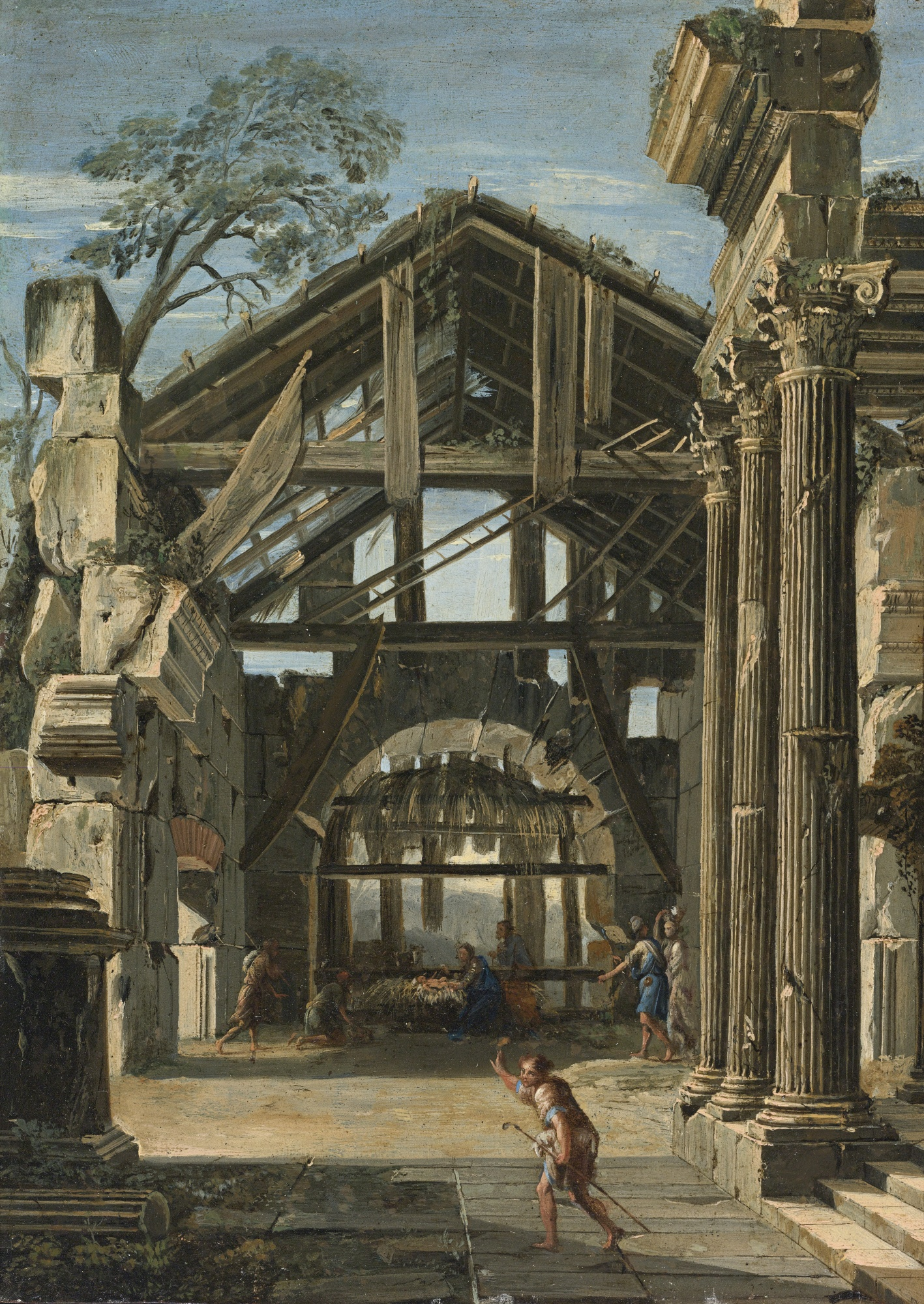
The Nativity in an ancient ruin

Most of Codazzi's paintings are medium-sized paintings of architecture, either ruins, ideal architecture, or capricci, in a landscape setting. The type of decorative architectural paintings that Salucci created represent a form that became popular in mid-17th century Rome. Art historians interpret the growing popularity of the architectural piece in 17th century Italy as the result of a shift of patronage from 'committente' to 'acquirente', that is, from painting on commission to painting on the open market. Architectural canvases were particularly welcome within the typical 17th-century decorative ensemble, where walls were completely covered with paintings of various types and sizes. The architectural piece lent variety to such ensembles by introducing the strong verticals and horizontals of its subject matter.

The roots of this type of vedute can be found in 16th-century painting, and in particular in the architectural settings that were painted as the framework of large-scale frescoes and ceiling decorations known as quadratura. These architectural elements gained prominence in 17th-century painting to become stand-alone subjects of easel paintings.

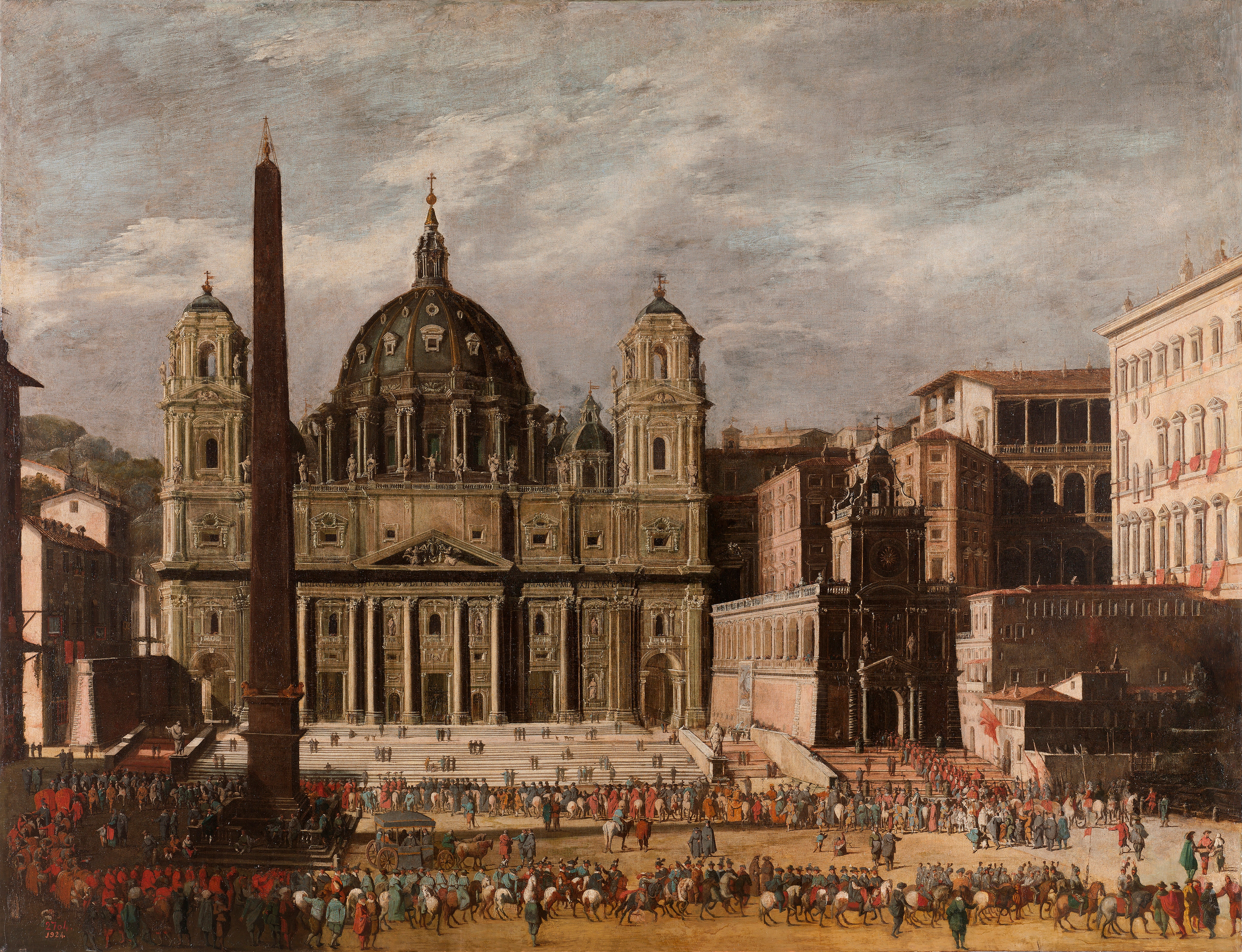
St. Peters Basilica

A number of artists practiced this genre. Alessandro Salucci was an important contemporary practitioner of the genre whose work was influenced by Viviano Codazzi. Codazzi's vedute where generally more realistic than those of Salucci who showed somewhat greater creativity and liberty by rearranging Roman monuments to serve the purpose of his compositions. Codazzi also did not adhere strictly to the dictations of topography and archaeology. His works show a search for architectural arrangements that evoke aesthetic harmony. Codazzi was acclaimed in his time as close to the ancient architect Vitruvius among 17th-century painters of architectural views. This recognition by his contemporaries was indicative of his mastery of linear perspective and understanding of antique taste.

Codazzi's depiction of St. Peters Basilica dated 1636 is more a veduta, i.e. a topographical view, than a capriccio. It was painted in Naples and shows the old entrance to the Vatican palace, which was destroyed when Bernini's Scala Regia and colonnade were constructed, as well as clock towers (campanili) based on an engraving of a never-executed design by Martino Ferabosco.

One of his best known paintings is a depiction of the Revolt of Masaniello in the Piazza del Mercato in Naples in which the figures were painted by Cerquozzi. The work was made in 1648 on a commission by Cardinal Bernardino Spada and is now in the Galleria Spada in Rome.

== Other projects ==
Media related to Viviano Codazzi at Wikimedia Commons
