= Angeluccio =

Italian painter

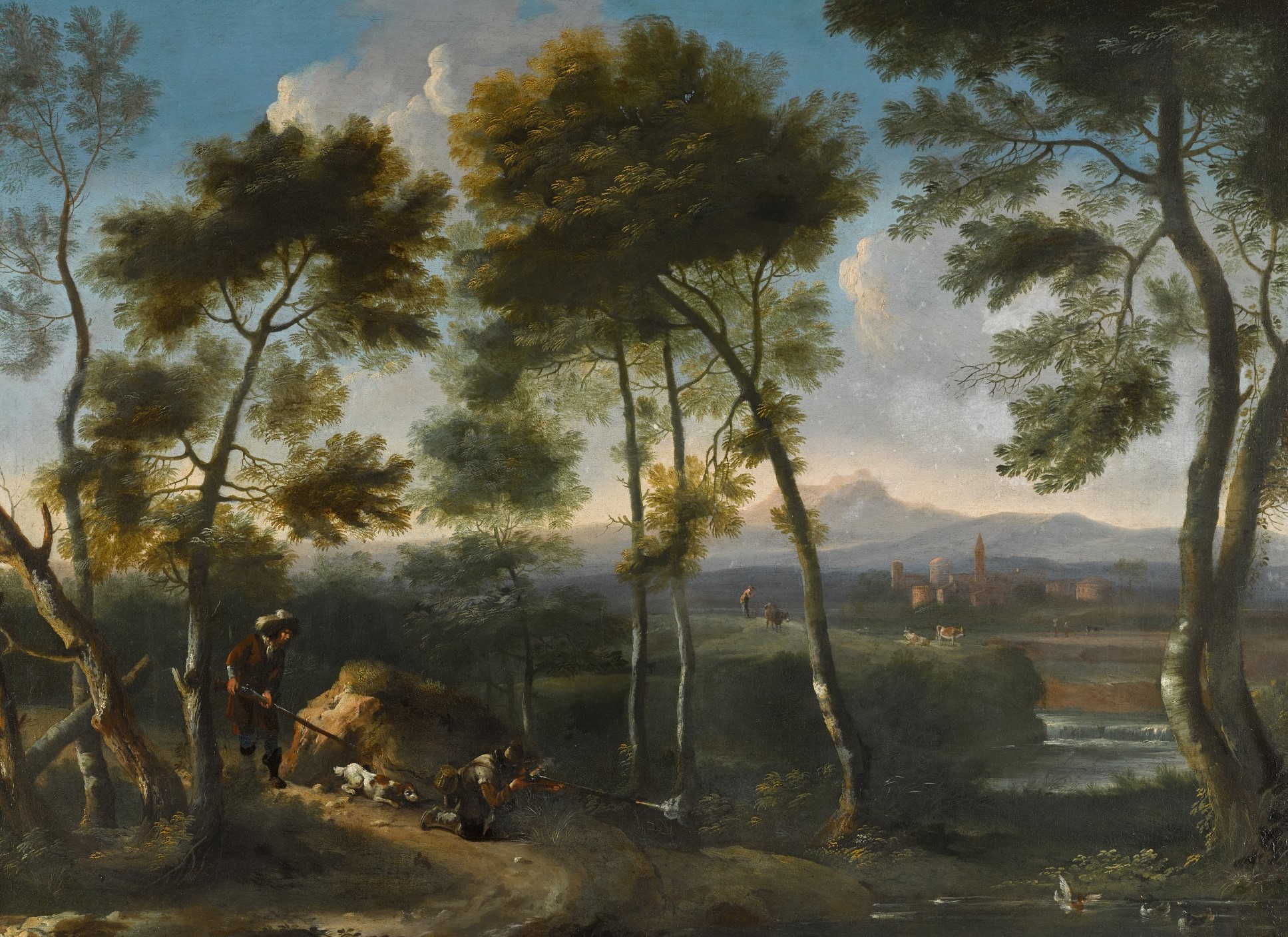
Landscape with Hunters Shooting Ducks (1645-1650), private collection

Giovanni Angelo (c. 1620 – c. 1650), better known as Angeluccio, was an Italian or Flemish landscape artist. He was a prominent pupil of Claude Lorrain and was active in Rome around 1645–1650. As an eminent member of Bamboccianti, he acquainted and befriended other influencer artists of the time, including Michelangelo Cerquozzi with whom he often collaborated. He is regarded as an artist of considerable talent and his works are often mistaken for his master's.

According to Pascoli, a biographer known for his writing of Angeluccio's master Claude Lorrain, Angeluccio was the most exceptional among all of Lorrain's pupils. Unfortunately, Angeluccio died young and produced only a modest number of works. His entire heritage consists of 25 paintings and 35 drawings, dated 1640–1650. In certain paintings, Lorrain's influence projects noticeably. In Landscape with Figures and Bridge, his earlier work, Angeluccio directly borrows Lorrain's key artistic elements such as centrally placed foreground figures framed by trees in the middle ground, standing before a bridge and a distant vista.

While Lorrain's artistic style played a critical role on the development of Angeluccio's style, he was not a mere imitator. Influenced also by Dutch painters such as Swanevelt and Jan Both, the young artist's paintings are characterized also by a blue-green tonality that was typical of Dutch and Flemish artists. His typical compositional characteristics are the rendering of a spatial depth, the showing of the horizon through an aperture in the dense foliage of the large trees, the domination of landscape over the relatively tiny figures, and the intense play of light and shadow. This blending of styles made his works unique and distinguishable, marking him as an important artist of his time.
