= Niccolò Codazzi =

Italian painter (1642–1693)

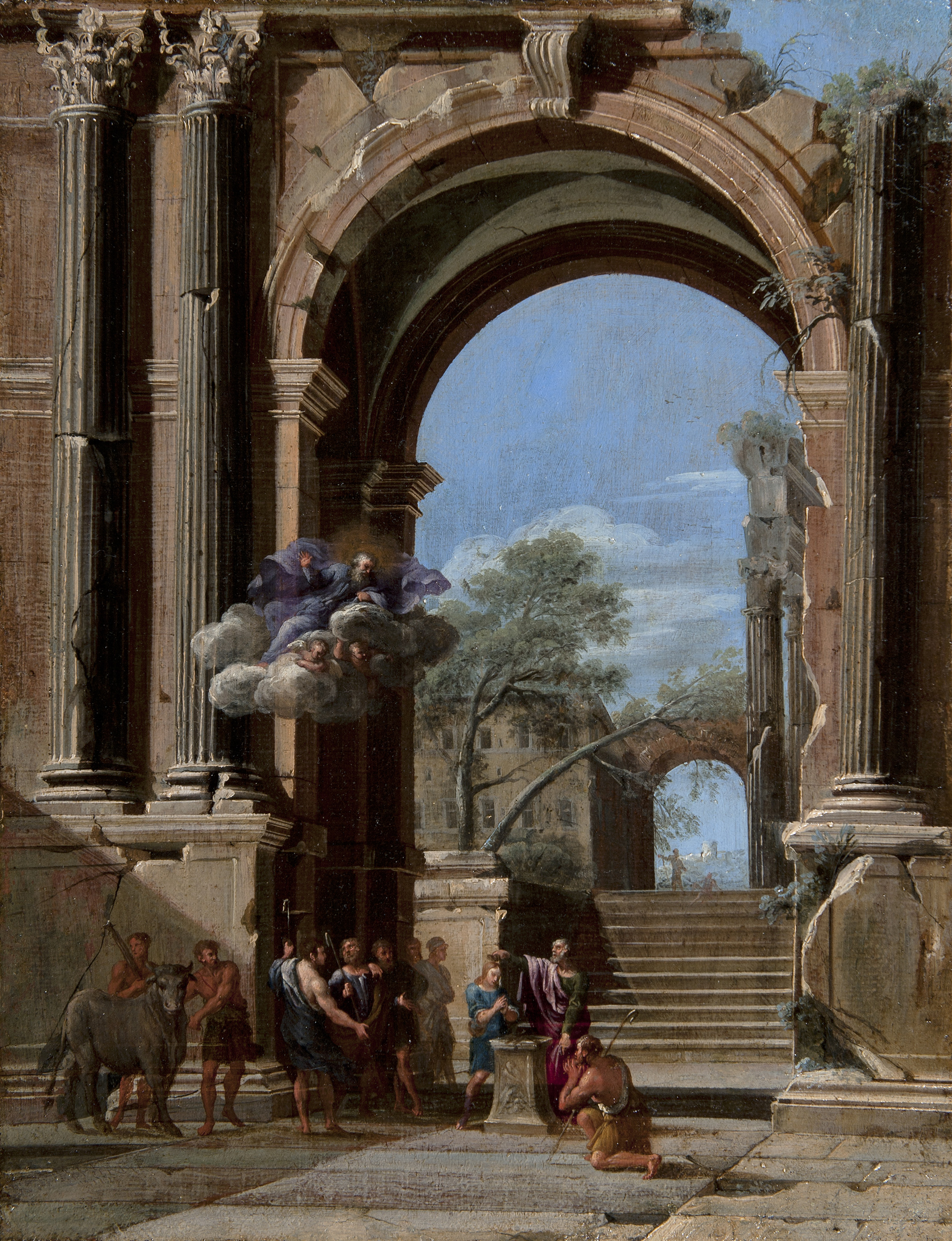
St Peter baptizing the centurion and the Arch of Titus

Niccolò Codazzi (1642 in Naples – 1693 in Genoa) was an Italian painter of architectural paintings, capricci and vedute. He also created decorative elements in frescos as a painter of 'quadratura'. A son of the prominent architectural painter Viviano Codazzi, he trained with his father and was active in Rome, Paris and Genoa.

== Life ==
Viviano Codazzi was born in Genoa as the first born son of Viviano Codazzi and Candida Miranda. His father had moved to Genoa in 1633 to work on major commissions. His family relocated to Rome following the anti-Spanish revolt of Masaniello in 1647.

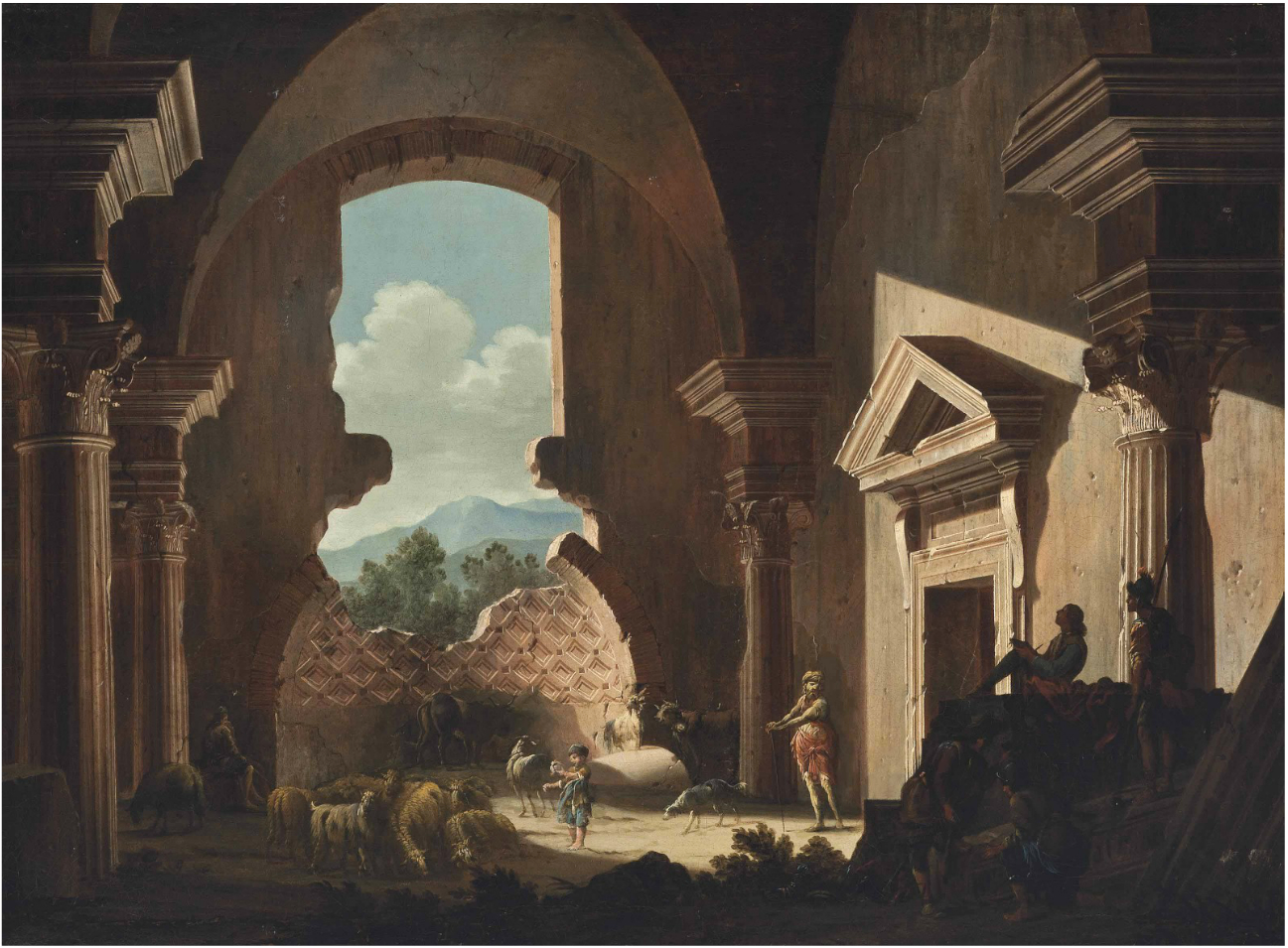
Shepherds and their flock, soldiers and a draughtsman inside ancient ruins

Niccolò Codazzi studied along with Vicente Giner under his father Viviano Codazzi. He later worked in his father's workshop. The works of father and son during his early period are difficult to distinguish. He was in Rome from 1675 and lived near the church of San Macuto. He was one of the artists who worked on the decoration of the piano nobile (grand salon) of the Palazzo Altieri.

Niccolò Codazzi moved to France, a move which was probably related to the fierce competition amongst painters in Rome. He was first in Aix-en-Provence where he collaborated with Nicolas Pinson. He later moved to Paris where he lived around 1681 and 1682. He clearly gained some notoriety in Paris since in 1681 he applied to enter the Académie royale de peinture et de sculpture. He was accepted thanks to Charles Lebrun's support of his candidacy.

During his French sojourn, he received a commission by king Louis XIV to paint landscapes with architecture for the Grand appartement de la reine at Versailles. He was commissioned to paint four large architecture paintings together with the painter René-Antoine Houasse for the queen’s stairs in Versailles.

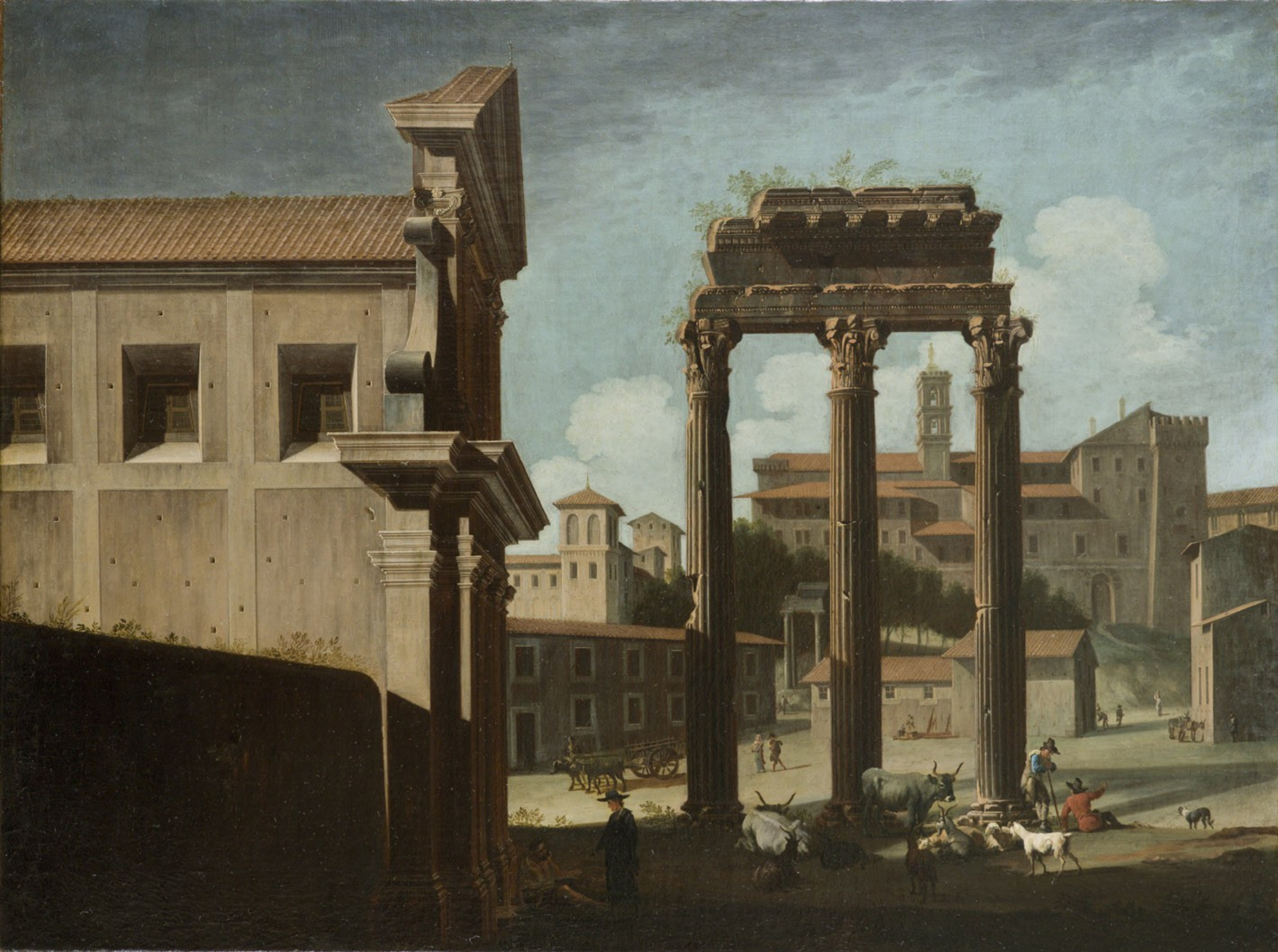
Campo Vaccino

At the end of his training in France, he returned to Italy, in all probability to Rome. He may also have spent time in Naples as some of his compositions are mentioned in the Naples collection of the prince of Galatro in 1688. In 1684 he rented a house in Zerbino near Genoa. In Genoa he worked alongside painters such as Gregorio de Ferrari and the Piola brothers. He is known to have worked with Paolo Gerolamo Piola on the decorations in the Palazzo Rosso.

At the time of his death, he was living in Genoa. He was buried in the now destroyed San Vito alla Foce.

== Work ==
Just like his father he predominantly painted architectural scenes, capricci and ruins. He is also likely to have only painted the architecture, leaving the figures to be added by different artists. The majority of his works are medium-sized architecture paintings depicting ideal architectural structures, or capricci, in a landscape. He developed an affinity for the association of ruins and nature similar to that of his father. The subject matter and style of his painting show the growing popularity of Classical Rome with collectors in the 17th century. Niccolò was also a painter of 'quadratura' and further executed decorations for festivities.

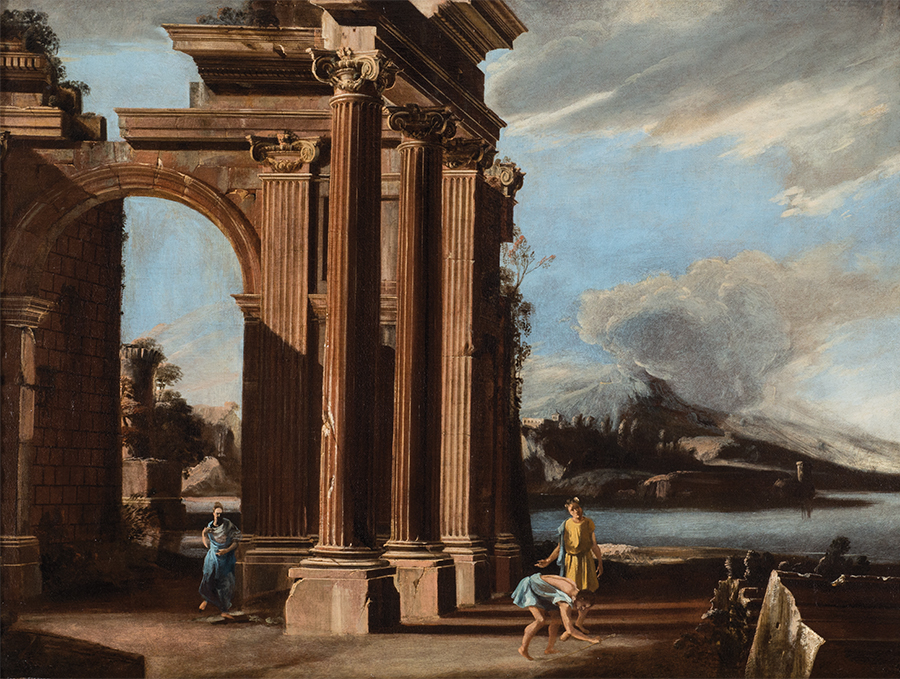
Eruption of Vesuvius with architecture and figures

His works demonstrate an exceptional mastery of perspective and colour scale. Through the skillful use of shadows he was able to add rhythm and space to his compositions. Codazzi's work is representative of Counter Reformation painting in his use of strong chiaroscuro. It is believed that Codazzi was nicknamed the “little Caravaggio” by Pietro Longhi.

The figures in his works are always painted by other artists, who were specialist staffage painters. His most frequent collaborator was Vicente Giner. He also collaborated with Theodor Helmbreker, Pieter van Bloemen, Jacob de Heusch, Filippo Lauri and Adriaen van der Cabel, and during his time in Genoa, with Paolo Gerolamo Piola.

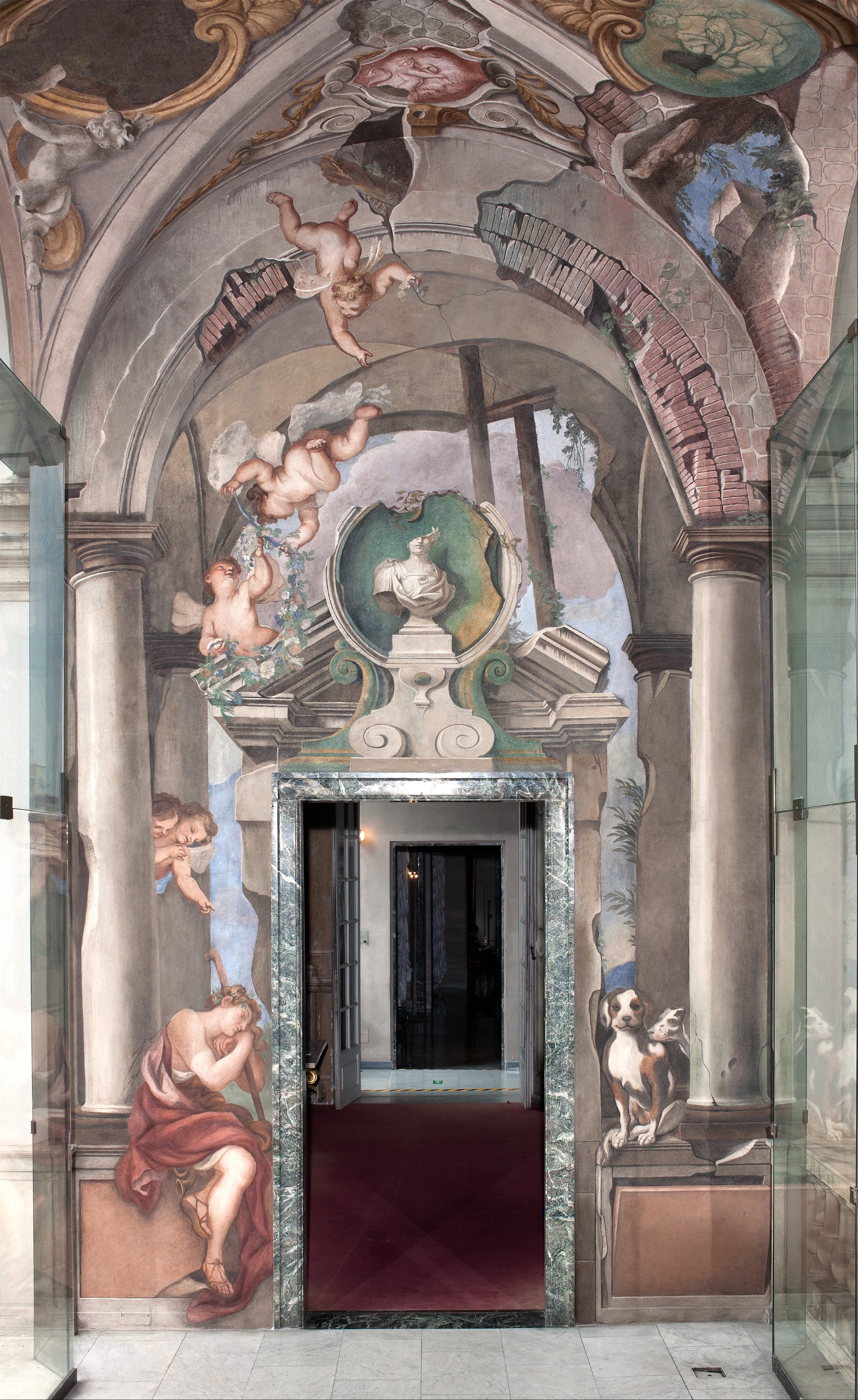
Loggia of the Ruins of the Palazzo Rosso, with Paolo Gerolamo Piola

The type of decorative architectural paintings that Codazzi created represented a form that had become popular in mid-17th century Rome. The predecessor of this type of vedute can be found in 16th-century painting, and in particular in the architectural settings that were painted as the framework of large-scale frescoes and ceiling decorations known as 'quadratura'. These architectural elements gained prominence in 17th-century painting to become stand-alone subjects of easel paintings.

== Other projects ==
Media related to Niccolò Codazzi at Wikimedia Commons
