= Agustín Codazzi (disambiguation) =

Agustín Codazzi or Agostino Codazzi (1793–1859) was an Italian military, scientist, geographer and cartographer.

Agustín Codazzi may also refer to:

- Agustín Codazzi, Cesar, a Colombian town named after Codazzi, who died there
- Geographic Institute Agustín Codazzi, the Colombian governmental cartographic institute
- Colegio Agustín Codazzi, a school in Caracas, Venezuela
