= Michelangelo Cerquozzi =

Italian painter (1602–1660)

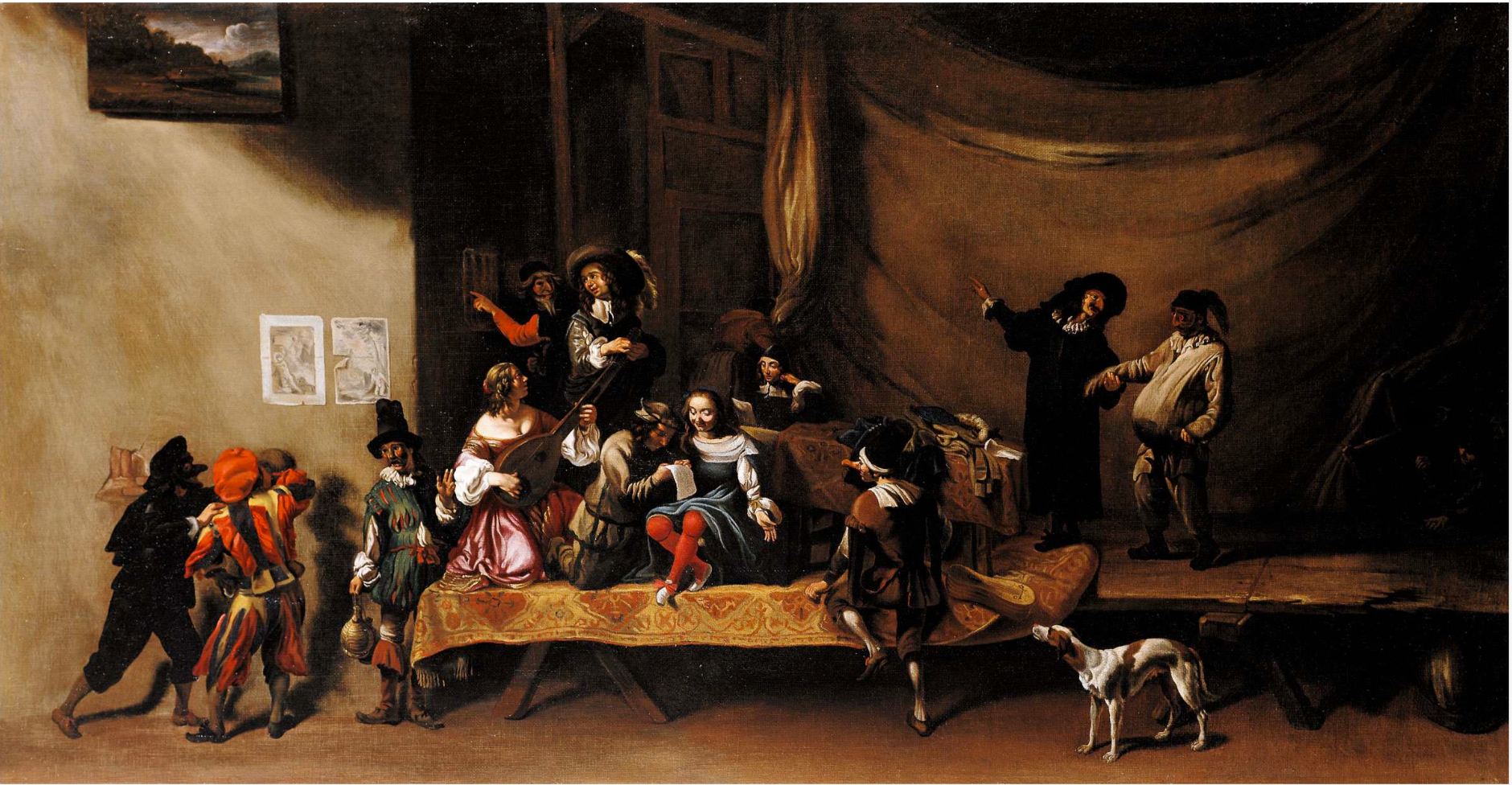
Scene from the Commedia dell'Arte

Michelangelo Cerquozzi, known as Michelangelo delle Battaglie (18 February 1602 – 6 April 1660) was an Italian Baroque painter known for his genre scenes, battle pictures, small religious and mythological works and still lifes. His genre scenes were influenced by the work of the Flemish and Dutch genre artists referred to as the Bamboccianti active in Rome who created small cabinet paintings and prints of the everyday life of the lower classes in Rome and its countryside. One of the leading battle painters active in Italy in the first half of the 17th century, Michelangelo Cerquozzi earned the nickname 'Michelangelo delle Battaglie' ('Michelangelo of the Battles').

== Life ==
Michelangelo Cerquozzi was born in Rome as the son of Marcello Cerquozzi and Lucia Vassalli, both Roman citizens. His father was a successful leather merchant and the family was well-off. Michelangelo Cerquozzi started his artistic training at the age of 12 in the studio of Giuseppe Cesari, a history painter in whose studio the young Caravaggio trained upon his arrival in Rome.

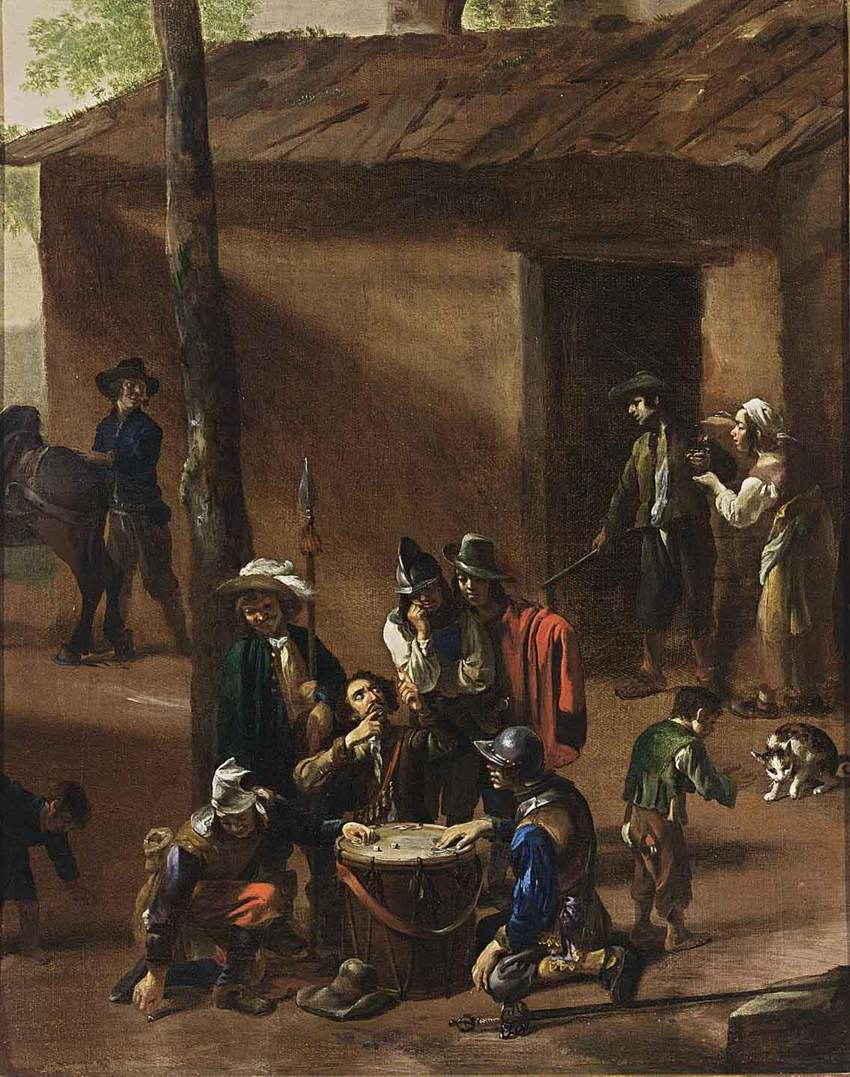
Soldiers Playing Dice

Various biographers and scholars describe Cerquozzi as an artist in close contact with the circle of Flemish and Dutch artists active in Rome. They place him in the period 1620-1621 as living or working in Rome alongside Jacob de Hase (also known as Giacomo Fiammingo), an Antwerp painter of battles who came to Rome in 1601. He may have studied with Jacob de Hase before this date. In 1624 he lived with the Dutch painters Paulus Bor originally from Amersfoort and Jan Harmansz originally from Reims, and during 1625-1630 with the Fleming Willem Michiels. By 1631, he had a studio with his pupil Matteo Bonicelli and Michiels.

The work from his early period is not well-known. He painted some battle paintings and also produced still life paintings which imitated the work of Pietro Paolo Bonzi, a still life specialist.

Cerquozzi joined the Accademia di San Luca in 1634 and attended their meetings until 1652. However, he never followed their strict decorum.

Cerquozzi gradually gained recognition starting from 1630 and his works sold very well to all classes of patrons. The early sponsorship of purchasers such as the merchant Dominico Viola played an important role in launching his career. He was also able to secure commissions from prominent patrons including professionals such as the lawyer Raffaelo Marchesi and the doctor Vincenzo Neri and aristocratic clients from the circle of the Barberini family, the Colonna family, Cardinal Rapaccioli, Modenese Count Camillo Carandini, count Carpegna and Monsignor Raggi. Many of his patrons were from circles that supported the Spanish cause in Italy. Cerquozzi would also collaborate on designs of Famiano Strada's De Bello Belgico celebrating Alessandro Farnese's campaigns to recapture the Spanish Netherlands for the Spanish emperor.

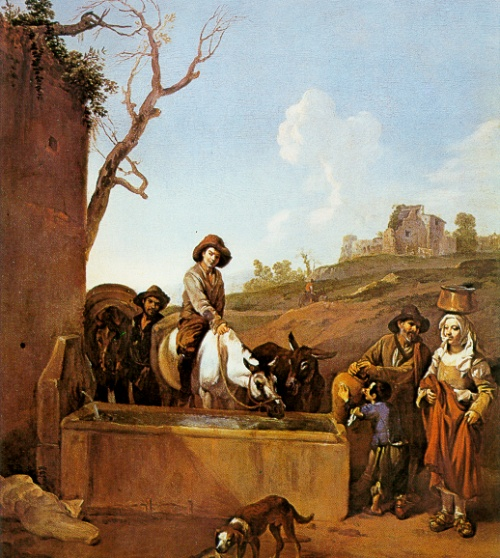
The trough

His friends included Pietro da Cortona, Giacinto Brandi, and Cornelis Bloemaert. Among his pupils were Matteo Bonicelli and Giovanni Francesco Gerardi.

Cerquozzi never married and remained childless. When he died on 29 March 1660 in Rome in his house located near the Spanish Steps he had become a very wealthy artist with important financial and property holdings.

== Work ==
=== General ===
Michelangelo Cerquozzi is best known for painting small canvases depicting genre scenes and his lively Baroque battle scenes. Cerquozzi was recognised as a prominent still life painter, while his multi-faceted career also included religious and mythological compositions. Cerquozzi executed only one public commission in Rome, a lunette depicting the Miracle of Saint Francis of Paolo in the cloister of the Church of Sant’Andrea delle Fratte, which has been lost. He is said to have painted altarpieces for several unidentified Sardinian churches.

Cerquozzi’s religious works are generally cabinet-sized pictures and feature, like his genre paintings, small, unidealized figures in naturalistic landscape settings. His mythological canvases, for example Hercules and Herminia and the Shepherds are grounded in a peasant world. He also painted some allegorical paintings, including personifications of the seasons, such as Summer and Spring (both in the Ashmolean Museum).

=== Battle paintings ===
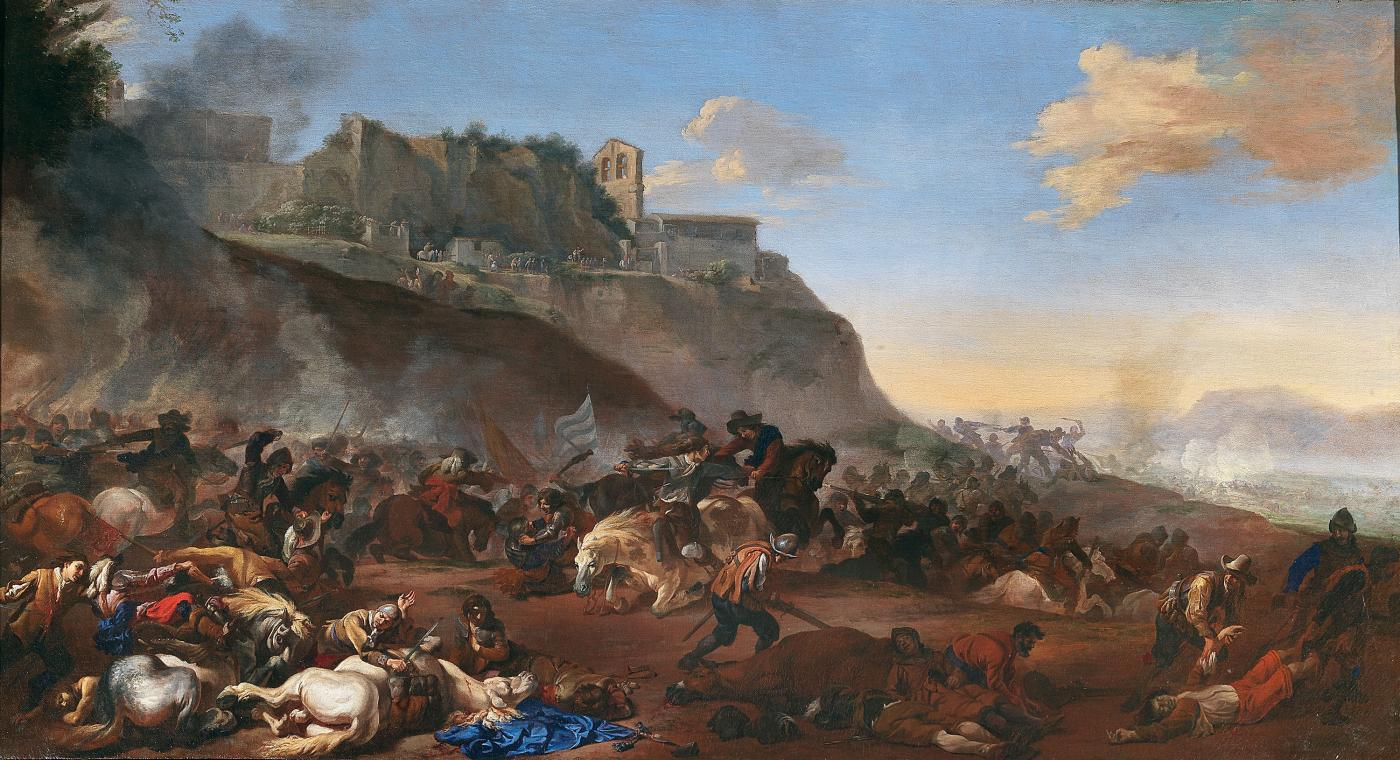
Battle scene

Michelangelo Cerquozzi earned the nickname 'Michelangelo delle Battaglie' for his battle pieces. In his battle pieces, he adapted the Bamboccianti style to the genre. Cerquozzi utilised an immediate, almost brutal language and pushed battle painting toward a representation of the naked facts. Some of his battle pieces were influenced by scenes of Salvator Rosa, such as the "Battle" in the Galleria Nazionale of Rome.

He made significant contributions to the genre in his small canvases. These feature a close-up viewpoint of a battle dominated by an intense cavalry conflict, complete with horses and men unbridled in whirling movement. These works influenced and anticipated Jacques Courtois' (Borgognone) achievements in the battle genre.

=== Genre scenes ===
In his genre scenes Cerquozzi shows his indebtedness to the Bamboccianti, the circle of Dutch and Flemish painters around Pieter van Laer and Jan Miel who had developed a new style in Rome rooted in Northern traditions of genre painting. A painting in this style was known as a Bambocciata (plural: Bambocciate). The important contribution of the Bamboccianti was the introduction to Roman painting of new subjects derived from Flemish and Dutch genre paintings including according to a contemporary source, "rogues, cheats, pickpockets, bands of drunks and gluttons, scabby tobacconists, barbers, and other 'sordid' subjects."

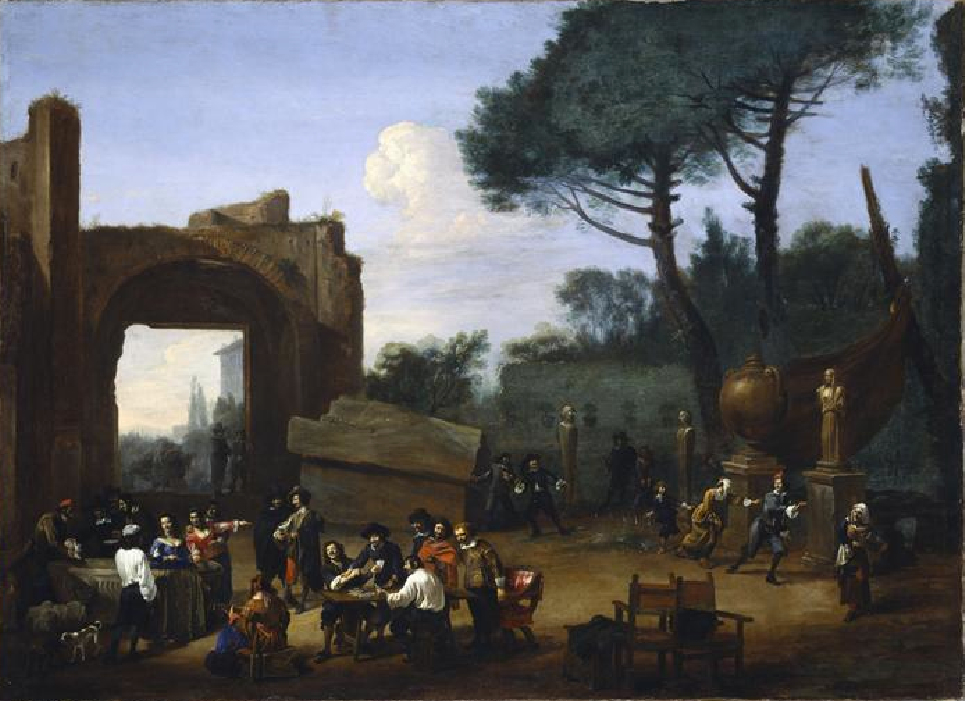
Party in a garden with Roman artists

In his early genre works Cerquozzi showed his mastery of the style of Pieter van Laer and Jan Miel in their compact scale, anti-heroic subject-matter and dramatic chiaroscuro effects. In these works Cerquozzi explored the humble life of the Roman people, among its ruins, in its taverns and their quarrels. He often set the scenes in Rome and the surrounding Campagna. Cerquozzi was not a slavish follower of these Flemish and Dutch models and differed from them in his emphasis on contemporary narrative and anecdotal elements. He also introduced figures of higher social standing, a tendency also present in Jan Miel's work during the 1640s and 1650s. Cerquozzi's Party in a garden with Roman artists (Kassel, Gemäldegalerie Alte Meister) displays typical bambocciata characteristics in its naturalism and small format. However, rather than the usual low-life figures it depicts groups of finely dressed men and women. These include the artist himself, his doctor Vincenzo Neri and other friends engaged in conversation and games.

The traditional art historical view was that the Bamboccianti style practised by the Bamboccianti offered a realist "true portrait of Rome and its popular life without variation or alteration" of what the artist sees. However, their contemporaries did not generally regard the Bamboccianti as realists. An alternative view of the art of the Bamboccianti is that their works constitute complex allegories that provide a commentary on classical art with a view to bringing the observer to contemplate elevated ideas. They thus stand in a long tradition of paradox in which low or vulgar subjects were the vehicle for conveying important philosophical meanings.

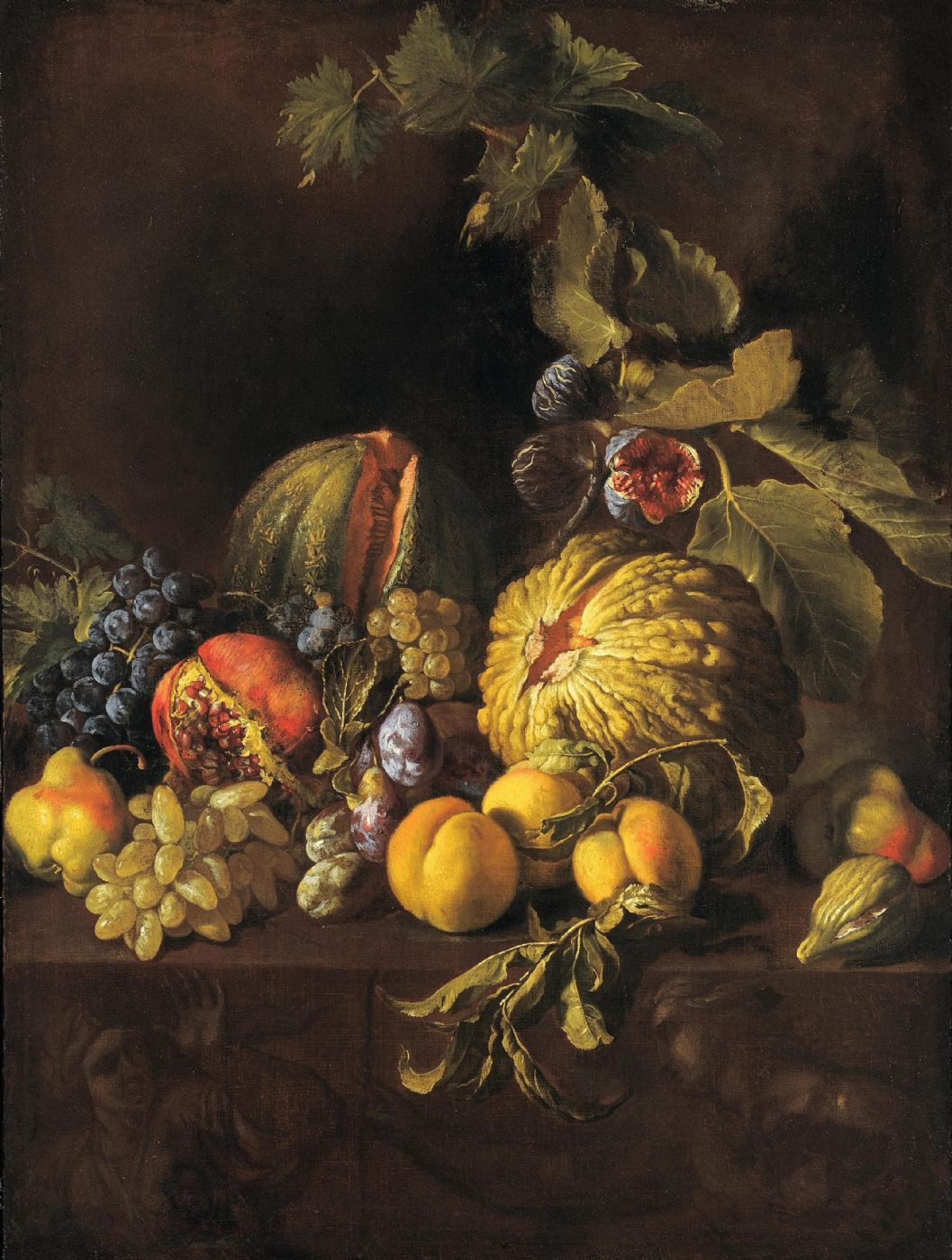
Still life with pumpkin, grapes and pears

While his style of painting was openly disdained by pre-eminent Italian painters in Rome and Bologna, such as Sacchi, Albani, and Reni, acceptance of the Bamboccianti in the Accademia di San Luca, the prestigious association of leading artists in Rome was not impossible. This is demonstrated by the fact that Cerquozzi and van Laer were associated with both. Cerquozzi was even admitted to the Accademia in 1634 when he was only 30 years old. The dislike of other artists for the Bamboccianti has been explained by the fact that they produced paintings which were often cheaper and thus constituted strong competition for 'serious' painters, particularly at the end of the 1640s and during the 1650s when the economy was depressed. Contrary to what these other artists believed, the most successful Bamboccianti such as Cerquozzi were in fact able to command high prices for their works.

=== Still life paintings ===
Cerquozzi painted still life paintings throughout his career. His early still life paintings imitated the work of Pietro Paolo Bonzi, a still life specialist. These painting were still lifes of fruits that strived for realism and showed the influence of Caravaggio. He started to compose large still life painting which included with life-size figures.

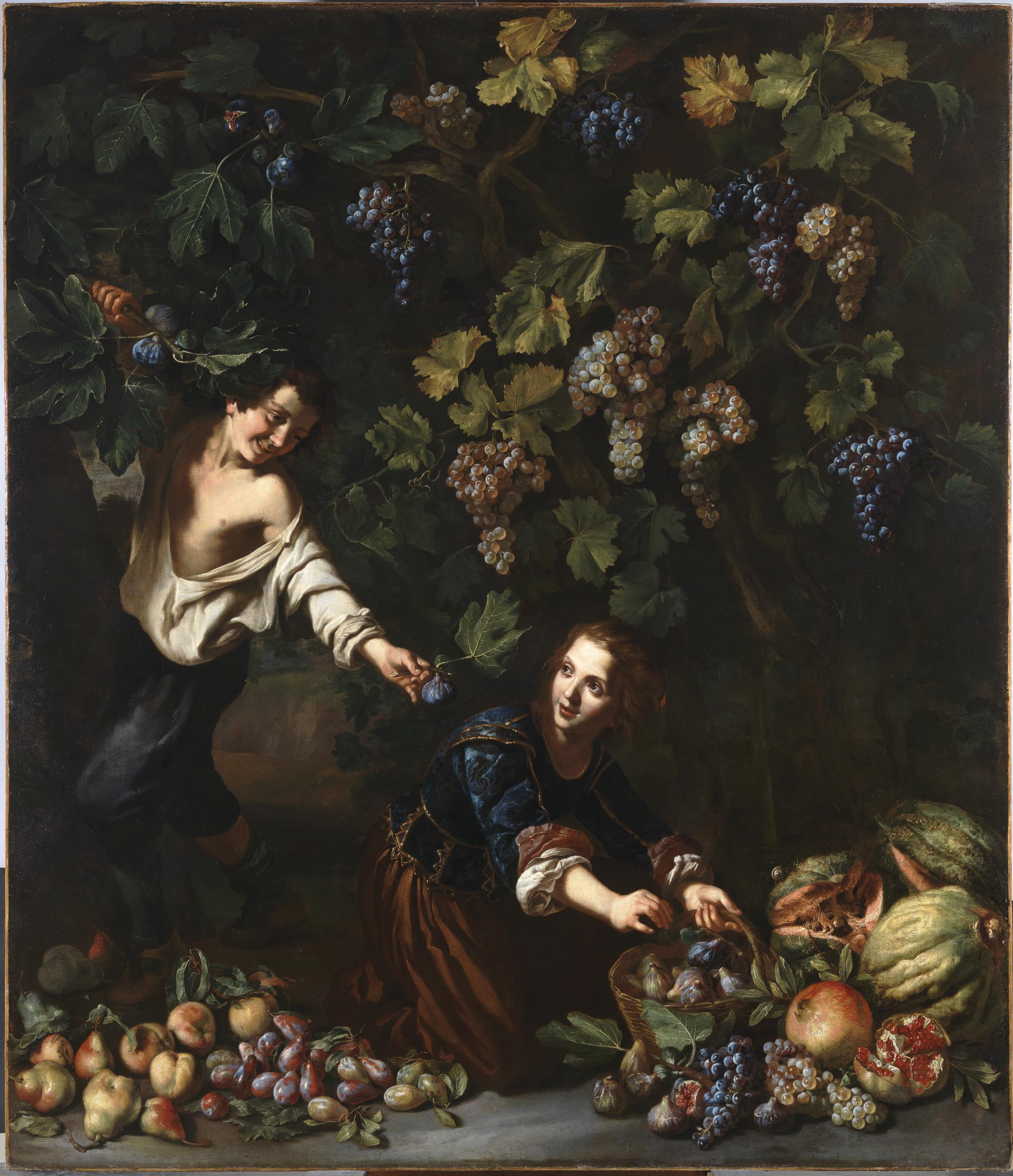
Youths picking fruit

Examples of his still life paintings are the Youths picking fruit (640-1645, Prado Museum) and the Harvest of pomegranates (after 1640, Museum Boijmans Van Beuningen), which both depict a young man and a young woman in an orchard with the man offering the sitting woman a piece of fruit. A still life of fruit is in front of the figures. The figures show clearly the influence of the Caravaggesque naturalism. The somewhat contorted expression of the young man, his naked torso and the open white shirt bring to mind the memory of certain early works of Caravaggio. The superb rendering of the vine leaves and grapes in the Prado piece evoke Caravaggio's Basket of fruit in the Biblioteca Ambrosiana. However, the opulence of the pumpkins, the open pomegranate and the presence of a landscape barely visible in the background point to a more advanced phase in the evolution of the genre and show full Baroque influences. The Baroque freedom of vision and "plein air" setting of these compositions show Cerquozzi to be a mediator from Caravaggio to the "Baroque".

The theme of the plucking of fruit and offering it to a young woman was already common in the Low Countries in the 16th century. In the Harvest of pomegranates in the Museum Boijmans Van Beuningen, the young man offers a pomegranate to the young women. The pomegranate was for centuries a symbol of fertility and abundance, undoubtedly because of the many seeds it contains. The erotic meaning of the composition is indicated by the fact that the fruit offered is about to burst and by the loving glance that the woman casts towards the man.

He achieved considerable success with his still lifes, which appear frequently in 17th and 18th century inventories.

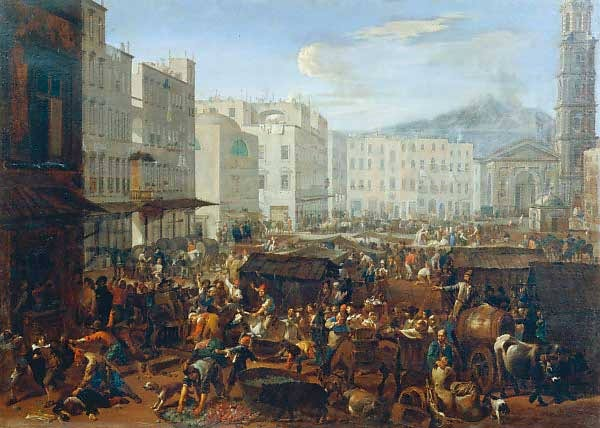
Revolt of Masaniello

=== Collaborations ===
He was a frequent collaborator with various landscape and architectural painters. These included collaborations with the architectural painters Viviano Codazzi (starting from the 1630s) and the landscape painter Angeluccio.

Cerquozzi and Codazzi became frequent collaborators. As Codazzi's compositions typically depicted Antique ruins and monuments, the collaboration likely made Cerquozzi move away from the representation of anecdotes of rural life to more elevated and exotic subjects. In 1657 the two artists collaborated on various canvases for Cardinal Flavio Chigi, one of the most important art patrons of his time. Some of the canvases made for Cardinal Chigi treated original subject matter. For instance, a composition entitled Women's bath represents a fantastic Renaissance interior in which numerous naked women are shown in sunken pools, possibly a surprising subject for a commission by a Cardinal.

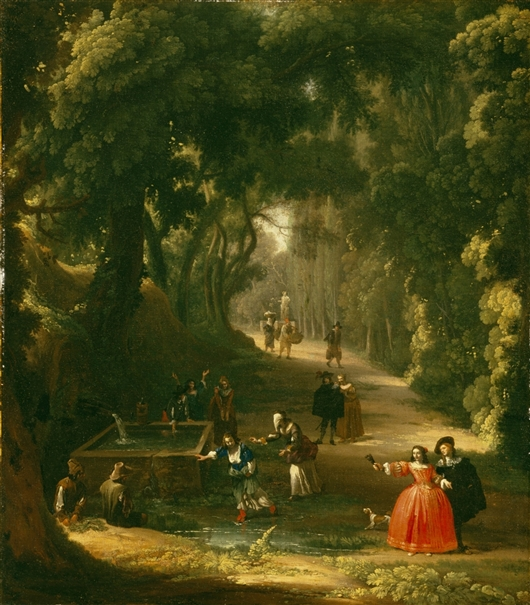
Blind Man's Bluff, with Angeluccio

Cerquozzi collaborated with Viviano Codazzi in 1648 on a canvas depicting the Revolt of Masaniello. This work deals with the anti-Spanish rebellion that took place on 7 July 1647 in the Piazza del Mercato in Naples with the support of France. Cerquozzi framed and objectified his observations on the event in a wide scenic and challenging perspective. He brilliantly used the naturalistic bambocciata manner to produce a comic–heroic portrayal of the revolt. He depicted a lively historical fresco in miniature, in which the town square, angry populace, petty thieves and animals are all enclosed by the wide view of the city which opens onto the Vesuvius. The various events which happened during the rebellion are depicted in this single composition. The leader of the rebellion appears on a horse in the centre front of the painting. Unlike the contemporary treatment of the same subject by Domenico Gargiulo who treats Masaniello twice in a single canvas as a primitive saint, Cerquozzi treated the anti-Spanish revolt, which was a very important event in Europe's balance of power, in a rather even-handed and objective manner even though he was generally regarded as being pro-Spanish. The piece had in fact been commissioned by Bernardino Spada, a pro-French cardinal. Cerquozzi, a painter of genre and battle scenes, may have been a logical choice for the cardinal. The historic rebellion was still regarded as 'news' at the time he commissioned the painting. Masaniello is represented not so much as a hero, or even a comic anti-hero, whether pro- or anti-Spanish, but as a kind of prodigy who rose above the ordinary fate of his class to accomplish fabulous deeds. Cerquozzi's composition can thus be regarded as falling in the genre of painted marvels, which travellers brought back from the East or the New World to document rarities of nature or peculiarities of human behaviour for the interest of European collectors. Masaniello, the fisherman who had become king, was similarly an aberration in the normal course of human events, and thus deserved such a representation.

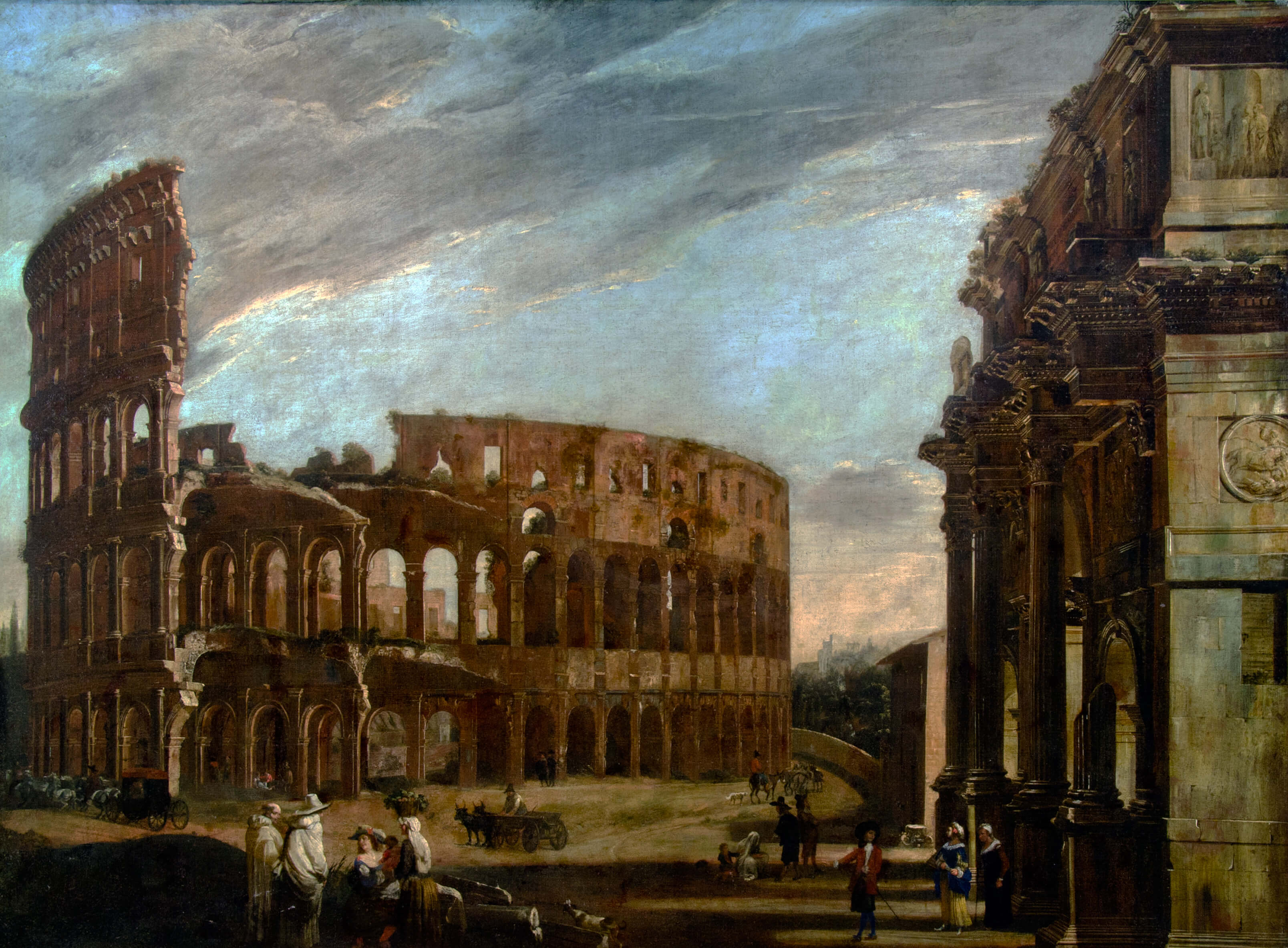
Colosseum and Arch of Constantine, with Viviano Codazzi

In 1647, Cerquozzi collaborated with Jan Miel, Giacomo Borgognone, and others on illustrations for he second volume of Famiano Strada's De Bello Belgico, which celebrated the campaigns waged by Alessandro Farnese in the Netherlands for the Spanish emperor.
