= Neefs =

Neefs is a Dutch-language surname meaning "nephew's" or "cousin's". It is most common in Brabant. Among variant forms are De Neef ("the cousin"), Neef (also a German name) and Neefjes. People with this surname include:

- Benedict Neefs (1741–1790), Flemish Cistercian abbot
- Edmond Neefs (fl. 1900), Belgian football player and sprinter
- Jacob Neefs (1610–aft.1660), Flemish etcher, engraver and publisher
- Lodewijck Neefs (1617–c.1649), Flemish painter of architectural church interiors
- Louis Neefs (1937 - 1980), Belgian singer and presenter
- Paul Neefs (1933–2009), Belgian architect and designer
- Pieter Neefs the Elder (1578 - between 1656 and 1661), a Flemish architectural painter
- Pieter Neefs the Younger (1620 – after 1675), a Flemish architectural painter

De Neef

- Roger M.J. De Neef (born 1941), Flemish writer and poet
- Sandra de Neef (born 1959), Dutch racing cyclist
- Steven De Neef (born 1971), Belgian racing cyclist

Deneef

- Alain Deneef (born 1960), Belgian entrepreneur
- Michael Deneef (1851–1891), United States Navy sailor and Medal of Honor recipient

Neef

- Ernst Neef (1908–1984), German geographer
- Francis Neef (1770–1854), French educator
- Gerhardt Neef (1946–2010), German football goalkeeper
- Manfred Max Neef (1932–2019), Chilean economist
- Melanie Neef (born 1970), British sprinter
- Wilhelm Neef (1916–1990), German conductor and film composer
