= Architectural painting =

Painting genre

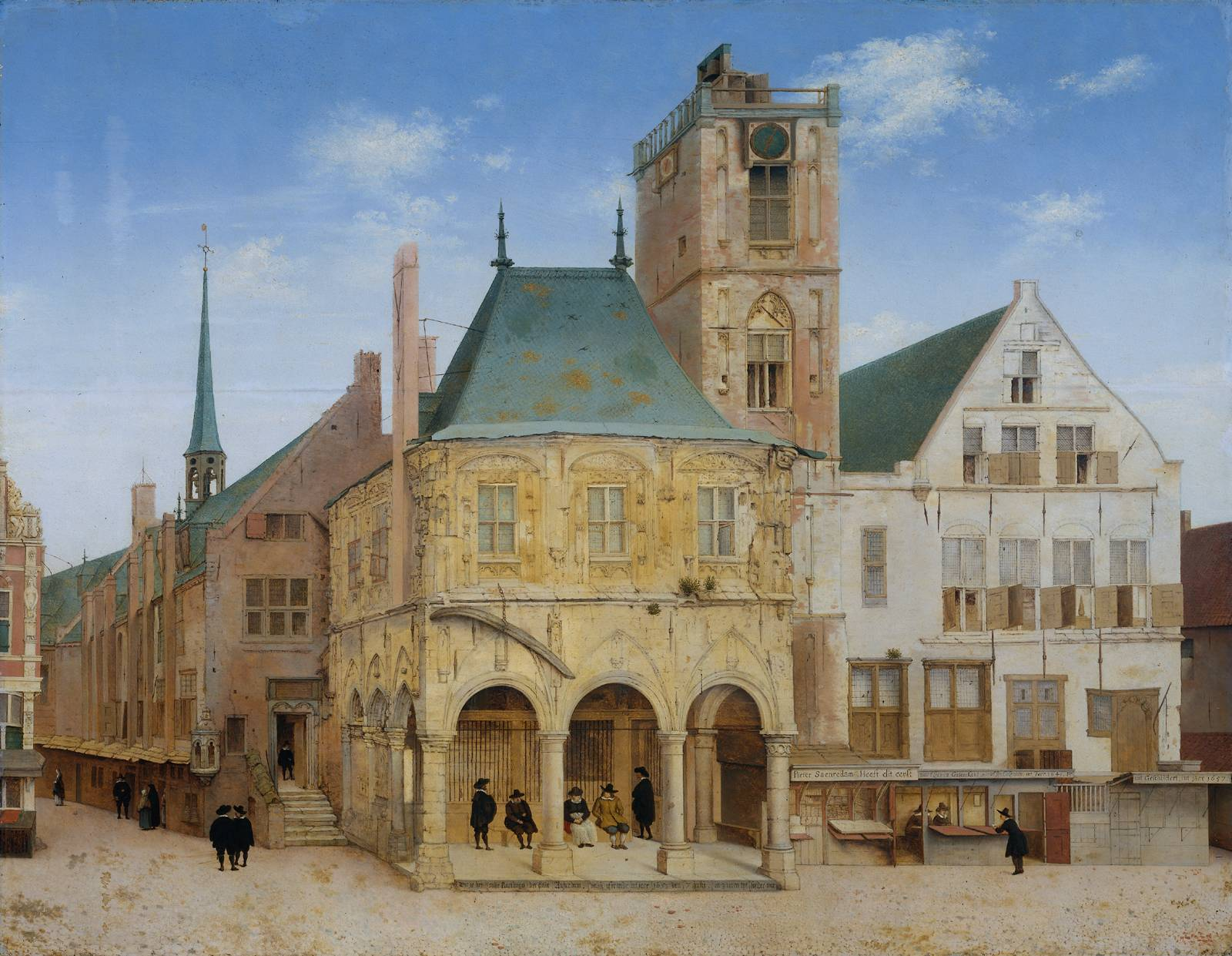
The Old Town Hall of Amsterdam by Pieter Jansz. Saenredam, 1657, Rijksmuseum, Amsterdam

Architectural painting (also Architecture painting) is a form of genre painting where the predominant focus lies on architecture, including both outdoor and interior views. While architecture was present in many of the earliest paintings and illuminations, it was mainly used as background or to provide rhythm to a painting. In the Renaissance, architecture was used to emphasize the perspective and create a sense of depth, like in Masaccio's Holy Trinity from the 1420s.

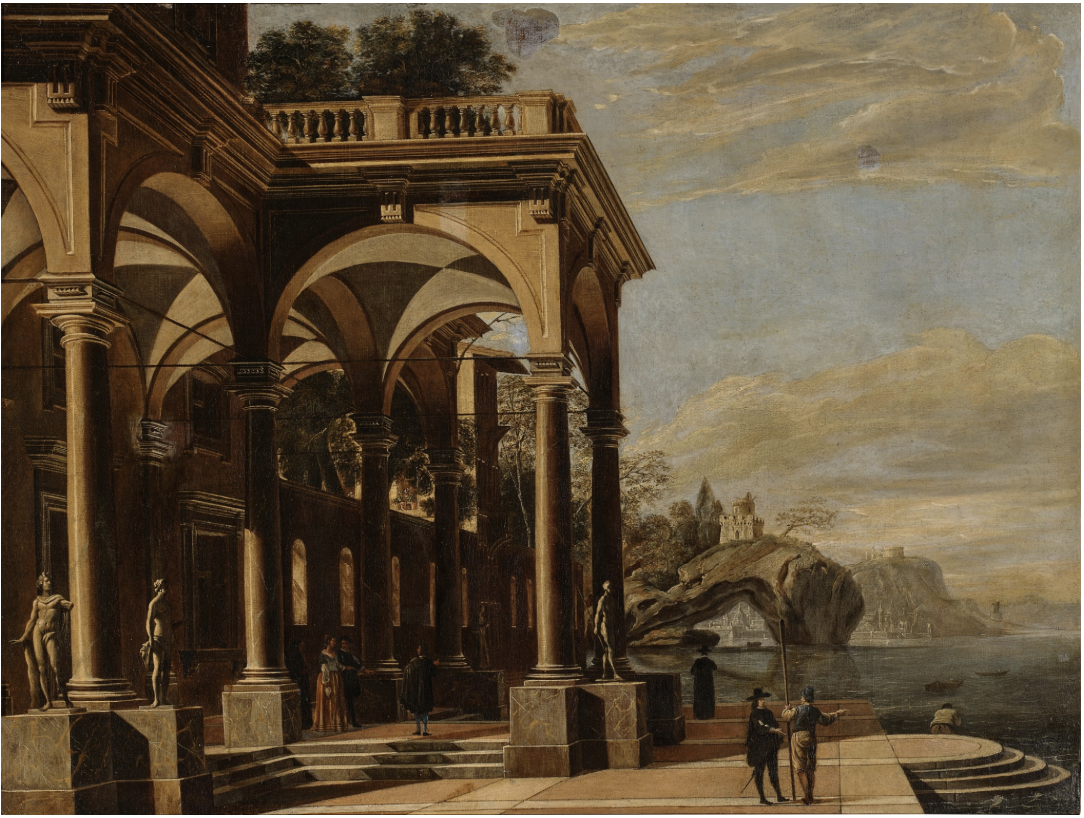
An architectural capriccio with figures by a colonnaded portico, a castle on a sea arch and coastal village beyond by Viviano Codazzi

In Western art, architectural painting as an independent genre developed in the 16th century in Flanders and the Dutch Republic, and reached its peak in 16th and 17th century Dutch painting. Later, it developed in Romantic painting, with e.g. views of ruins becoming very popular. Closely related genres are architectural fantasies and trompe-l'oeils, especially illusionistic ceiling painting, and cityscapes.

By this time architectural subjects had become very important in printmaking, and in the nineteenth century they became very popular in watercolour painting, especially in Britain.

== Western artists specialized in architectural painting ==
=== 16th century ===
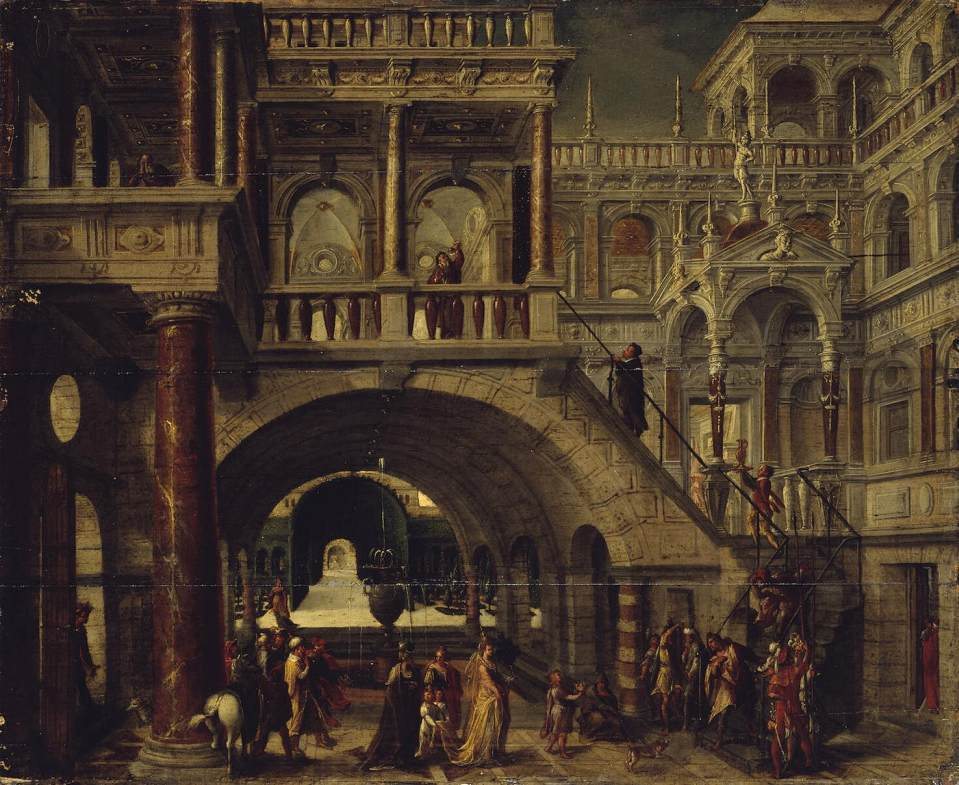
Architectural landscape by Hans Vredeman de Vries, Hermitage Museum

The 16th century saw the development of architectural painting as a separate genre in Western art. The main centers in this period were Flanders and the Dutch Republic. The first important architectural painter was Dutch Hans Vredeman de Vries (1527–1607), who was both an architect and a painter. Students of Hans Vredeman de Vries, both in Flanders and in the Netherlands, include his sons Salomon and Paul, and Hendrik van Steenwijk I. Through them the genre was popularized and their family and students turned it into one of the main domains of Dutch Golden Age painting.

==== Flemish painting ====
- Salomon Vredeman de Vries (1556–1604)
- Paul Vredeman de Vries (1567–1617)
- Hendrick Aerts (between 1565 and 1575 – 1603)

==== Dutch painting ====
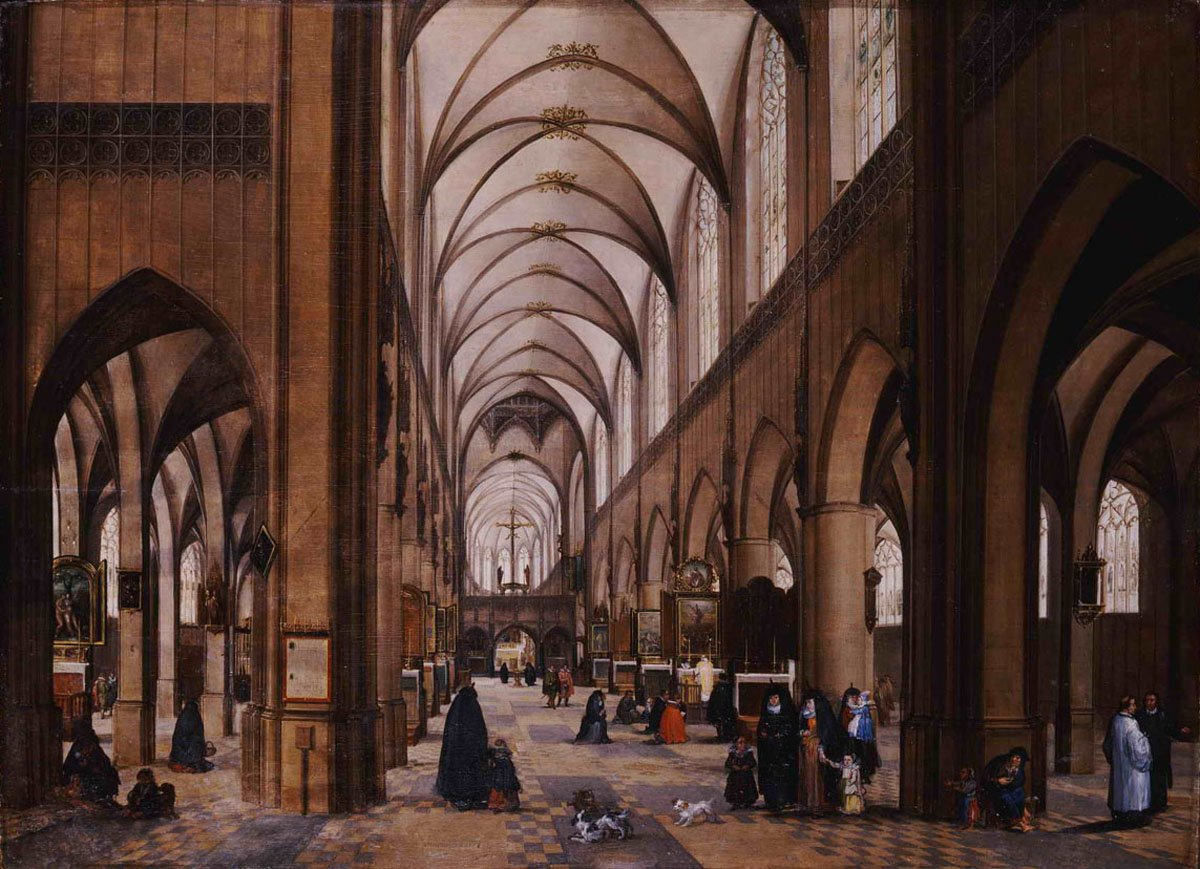
Antwerp Cathedral by Hendrik van Steenwijk I and Jan Brueghel the Elder, Museum of Fine Arts, Budapest

- Hans Vredeman de Vries (1527–1607)
- Hendrik van Steenwijk I (1550–1603), the first to specialize in church interiors

=== 17th century ===
==== Flemish painting ====
Notable Flemish painter of the genre include:

- Hendrik van Steenwijk II (1580–1649)
- Pieter Neefs the Elder (1578–1656)
- Hendrik van Steenwijk II (c.1580–1649)

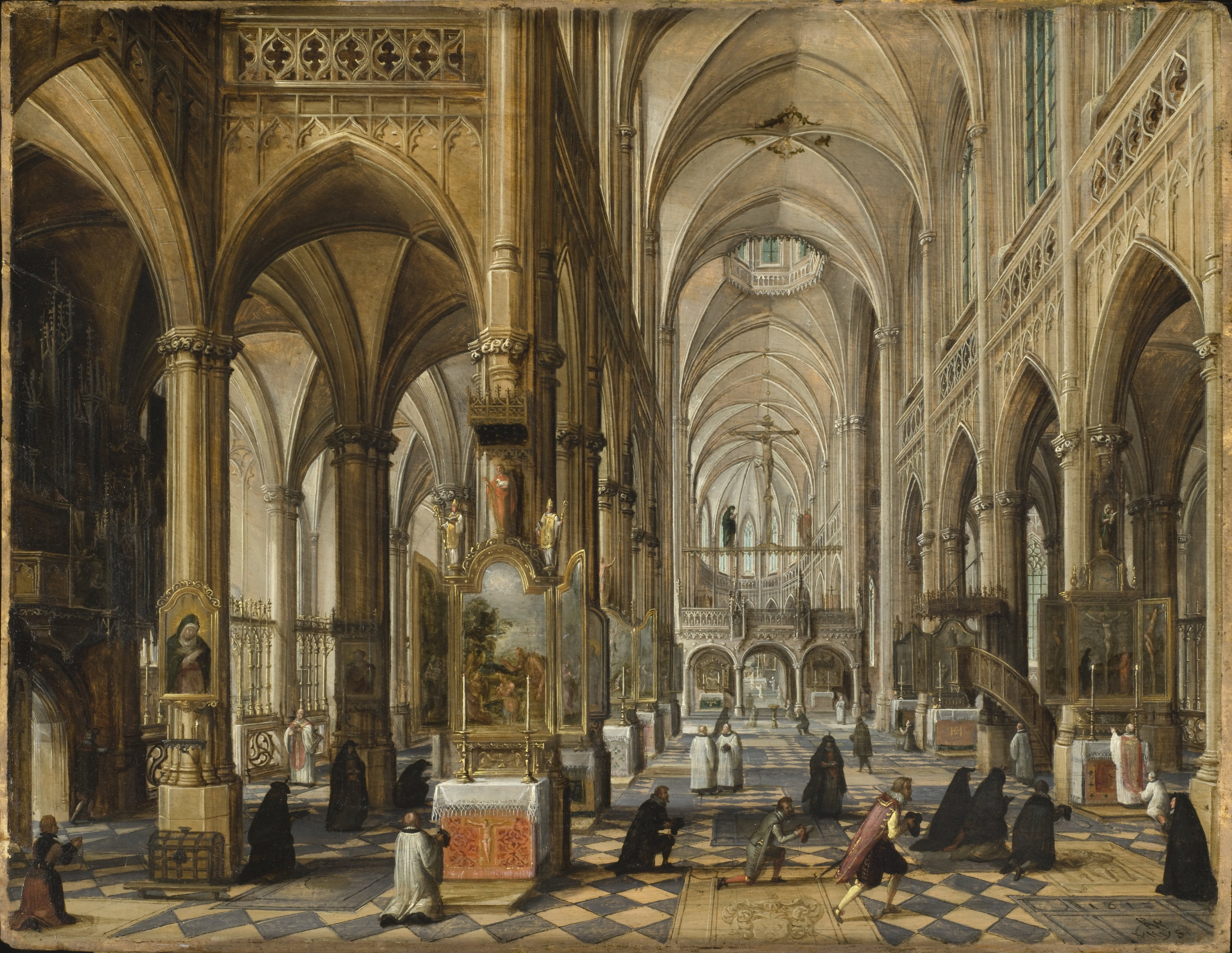
Paul Vredeman de Vries, 1612, Interior of a Gothic Cathedral, Los Angeles County Museum of Art

- Lodewijck Neefs (1617–1649)
- Wolfgang de Smet (1617–1685)
- Pieter Neefs the Younger (1620–1675)
- Erasmus de Bie (1629–1675), between cityscapes and architectural painting proper
- Wilhelm Schubert van Ehrenberg (1630–c. 1676)
- Jacobus Ferdinandus Saey (1658 – after 1726)
- Lievin Cruyl (1634–1720)

==== Italian painting ====
- Viviano Codazzi (1606–1670)
- Ascanio Luciano (1621–1706)
- Andrea Pozzo (1642–1709), mainly illusionistic paintings
- Luigi Quaini (1643–1717), not a pure architectural painter, but a contributor of architecture to other paintings

==== Dutch painting ====
In the 17th century, architectural painting became one of the leading genres in the Dutch Golden Age, together with portrait painting and landscapes. Notable Dutch painter of the genre include:

- Bartholomeus van Bassen (1590–1652)
- Pieter van der Stock (1593–1660)

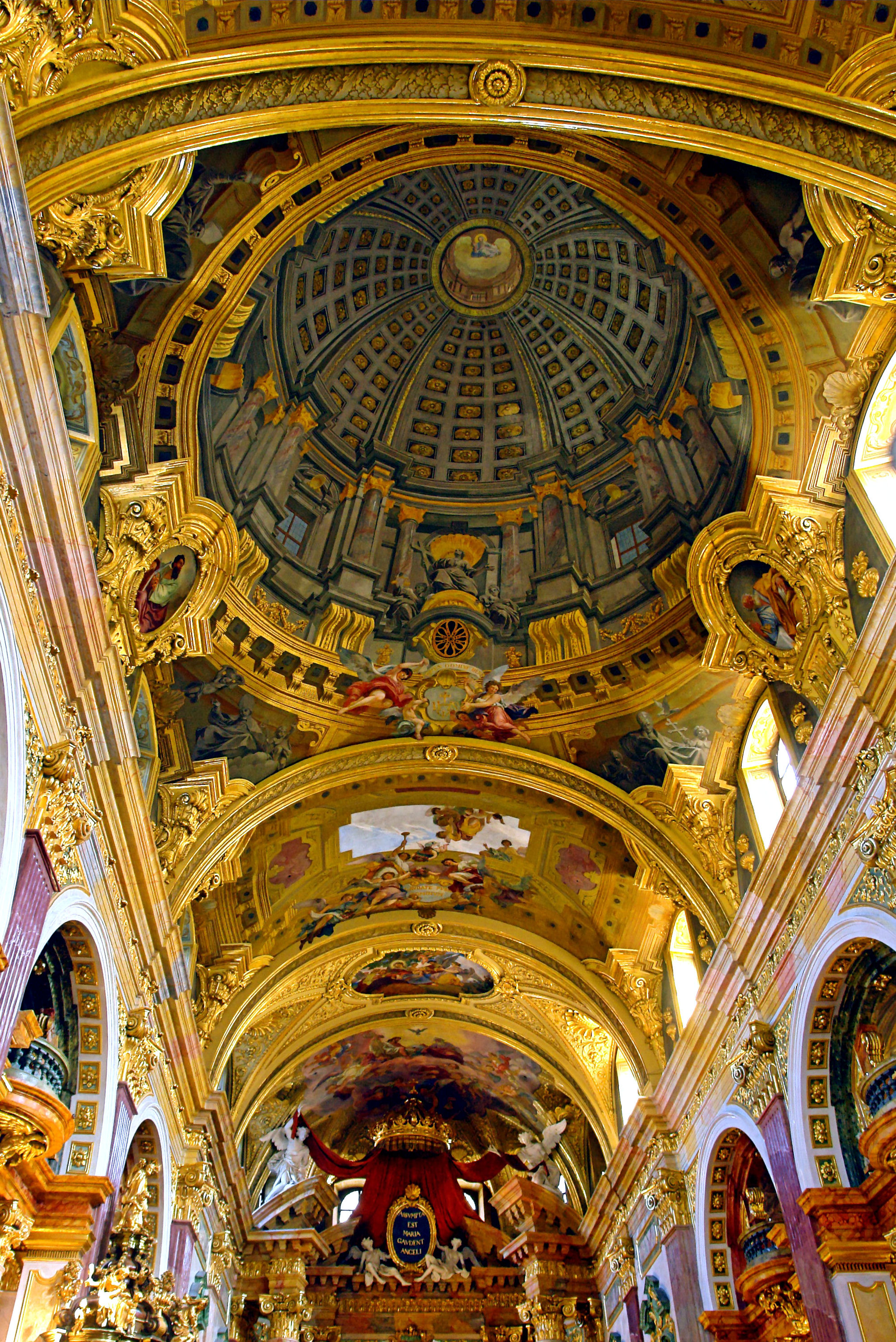
Andrea Pozzo, 1703, illusionistic ceiling painting in the Jesuit Church, Vienna

- Pieter Jansz. Saenredam (1597–1665)
- Gerard Houckgeest (1600–1661)
- Susanna van Steenwijk (1601–1664)
- Dirck van Delen (1605–1671)
- Daniël de Blieck (c. 1610–1673)
- Hendrick Cornelisz. van Vliet (1612–1675): mainly church interiors
- Emanuel de Witte (1617–1692)
- Job Adriaenszoon Berckheyde (1630–1693)
- Jan van der Heyden (1637–1712)
- Gerrit Adriaenszoon Berckheyde (1638–1698)
- Caspar van Wittel (1652 or 1653–1736)

=== 18th century ===
==== Frenc painting ====
- Jacques de Lajoue (1687–1761)

==== Italian painting ====
Architectural paintings, and the related vedute or cityscapes, were especially popular in 18th century Italy. Another genre closely related to architectural painting proper were the capriccios, fantasies set in and focusing on an imaginary architecture.

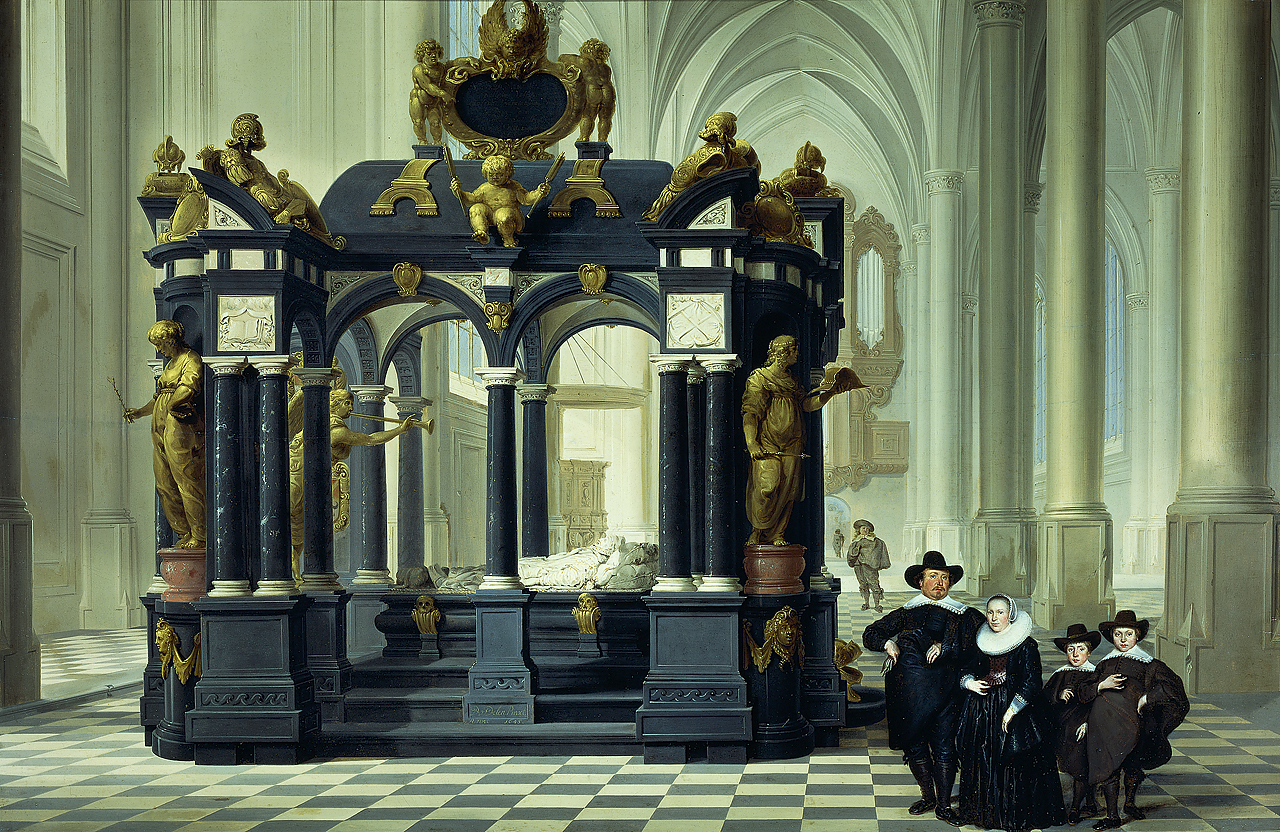
Dirck van Delen, A family beside the tomb of Willem I in the Nieuwe Kerk, Delft, 1645, Rijksmuseum

- Stefano Orlandi (1681–1760)

==== Dutch painting ====
- Cornelis Pronk (1691–1759)
- Jan ten Compe (1713–1761)

=== 19th century ===
==== Austria ====
- Rudolf von Alt (1812–1905)

==== Belgium ====
- Jules Victor Génisson (1805–1860)
- Jean-Baptiste Van Moer (1819–1884)

==== Denmark ====
- Adolf Heinrich-Hansen (1859–1925)
- Heinrich Hansen (1821–1890)
- Jacob Kornerup (1825–1913)
- Martinus Rørbye (1803–1848)

==== France ====
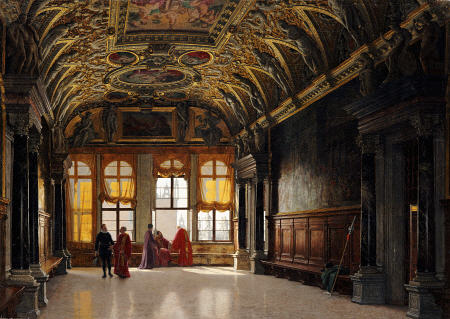
Heinrich Hansen, "Sala Delle Quattro Porte, Palazzo Ducale, Venice", 1883

- Charles Marie Bouton (1781–1853)
- Léon Trousset (1838–1917)

==== Germany ====
- Wilhelm Barth (1779–1852)
- Michael Neher (1798–1876)
- Eduard Gaertner (1801–1877)
- Max Emanuel Ainmiller (1807–1870)
- Friedrich August Elsasser (1810–1845)
- Hermann Gemmel (1813–1868)
- Adolf Seel (1829–1907)

==== Italy ====
- Giovanni Migliara (1785–1837)
- Federico Moja (1802–1885)

==== United Kingdom ====
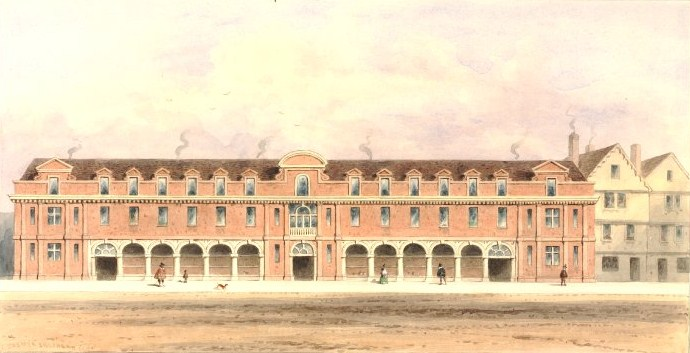
Thomas H. Shepherd, 1853, New England Bank, British Museum

- Joseph Gandy (1771–1843)
- Samuel Prout (1783–1852), watercolours
- George Johann Scharf (1788–1860), watercolours. German-born but his career was in England, from 1816
- Thomas H. Shepherd (1792–1864), watercolours
- David Roberts (1796–1864)

=== Modern art ===
- Colin Campbell Cooper, painter of skyscrapers
- Eugeniusz Molski, Polish painter
- Carl Laubin (born 1947), American-British painter

== Chinese architectural painting ==
In China, architectural painting was called "jiehua", and mainly seen as an inferior type of painting. Known masters of the genre include the 10th century painter Guo Zhongshu, and Wang Zhenpeng, who was active around 1300.
