= Christ after the Flagellation =

Christ after the Flagellation may refer to:

- Christ after the Flagellation (Murillo, Boston) (c. 1665)
- Christ after the Flagellation (Murillo, Champaign) (c. 1670)
