= Pieter Neefs =

Pieter Neefs may refer to:

- Pieter Neefs the Elder (c. 1578 – after 1656), Flemish painter
- Pieter Neefs the Younger (1620 – after 1675), Flemish painter
