= The Great Staircase, Stafford House =

Painting by David Roberts

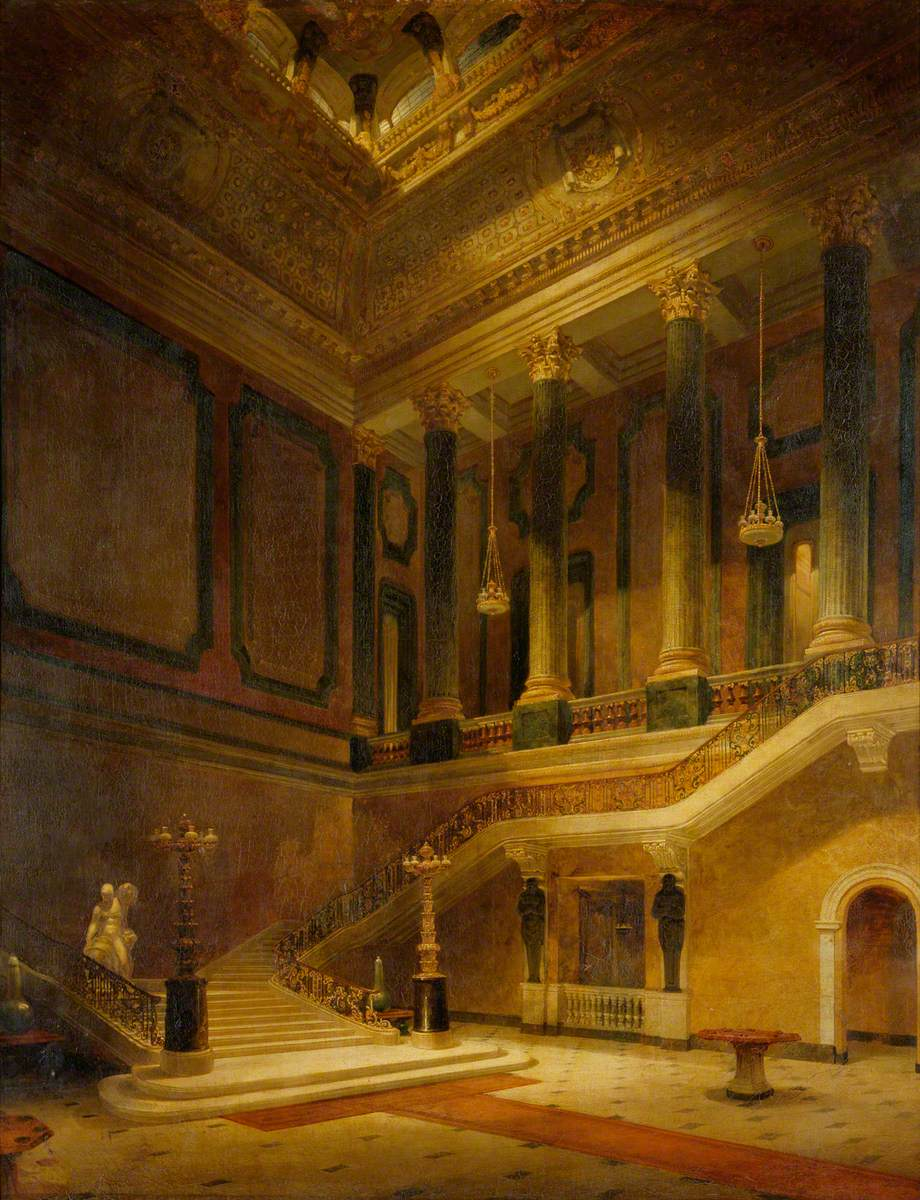
- Artist: David Roberts
- Year: 1832
- Type: Oil on canvas, Architectural painting
- Dimensions: 133 cm × 103 cm (52 in × 41 in)
- Location: Lancaster House, London

The Great Staircase, Stafford House is an 1832 oil painting by the British artist David Roberts. An architectural painting it shows the interior of Stafford House in London. The grand townhouse had been taken over from the Duke of York by the aristocrat and former diplomat the Marquess of Stafford. Stafford got the architect Benjamin Dean Wyatt to completely redesign the interior, the highlight of which was the main staircase. Stafford commissioned this painting in 1830 to commemorate the refurbishment.

The painting was a major early commission for Roberts, who had been a scene painter at the Theatre Royal, Drury Lane before turning to produce successful oil paintings. He later became known for his paintings of the Middle East and was elected a member of the Royal Academy. He received £200 for the work which is today part of the Government Art Collection, having been acquired in 1958 and continued to hang at the property which has since been renamed Lancaster House.

== Bibliography ==
- Daleski, Hillel Matthew & Baumgarten, Murray (ed.) Homes and Homelessness in the Victorian Imagination. AMS Press, 1998.
- Guiterman, Helen. David Roberts, 1796–1864, Artist, Adventurer. Scottish Arts Council, 1981.
- Sim, Katherine. David Roberts R.A., 1796–1864: A Biography. Quartet Books, 1984.
