= Christ after the Flagellation (Murillo, Boston) =

Painting by Bartolomé Esteban Murillo, now in Museum of Fine Arts, Boston

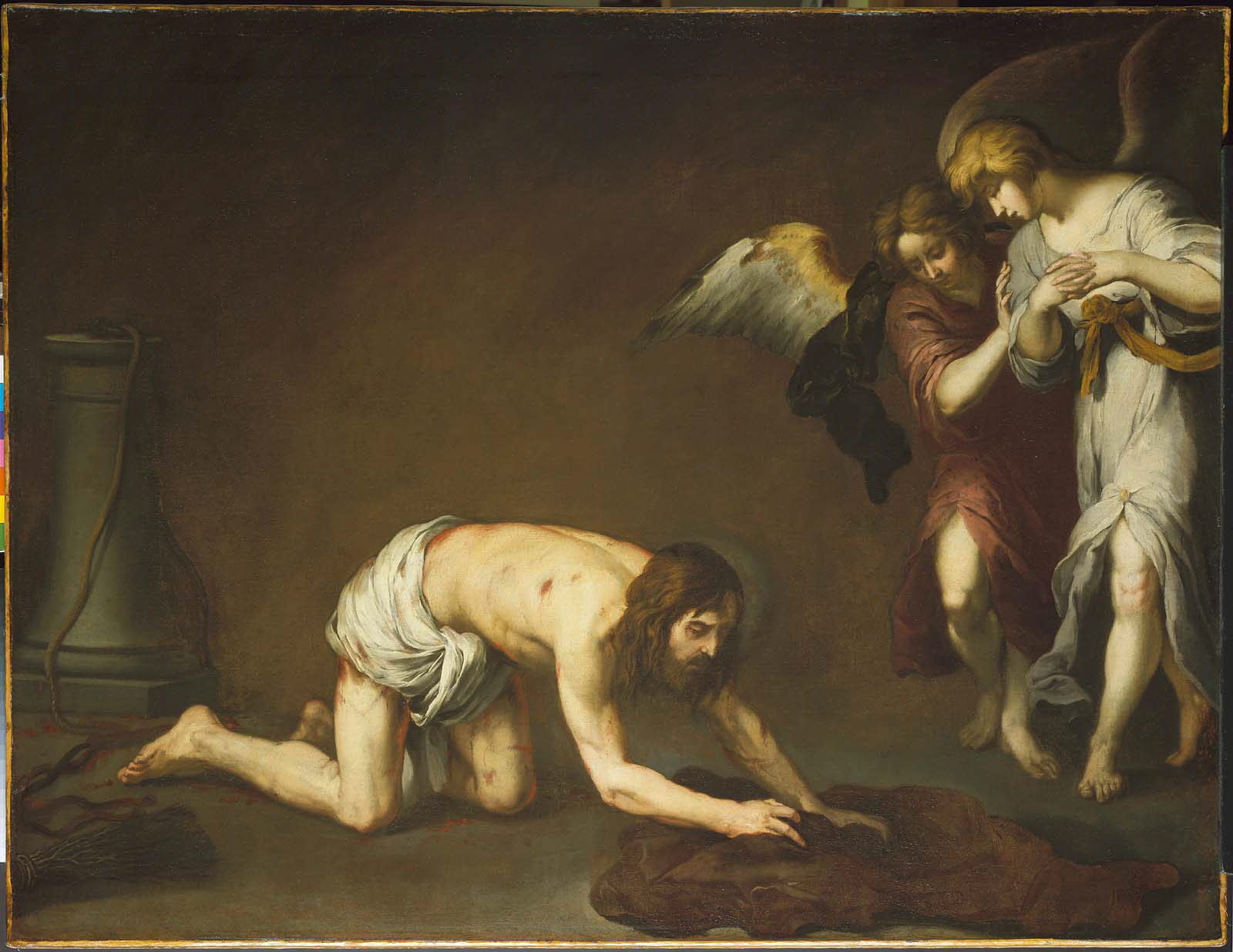
Christ after the Flagellation (c. 1665) by Bartolomé Esteban Murillo

Christ after the Flagellation is an oil on canvas painting by Murillo, created c. 1665, now in the Museum of Fine Arts Boston, for which it was bought in 1953 via the Ernest Wadsworth Longfellow Fund. The artist also produced a slightly later version of the scene, now in Illinois.

It first appears in the written record in the collection of Noël Desenfans, at the sale of whose collection in 1802 it was sold for £9 18 shillings, probably to Jean-Baptiste-Pierre Le Brun, then from Le Brun's collection to Pierre-Joseph Lafontaine the following year. It passed through various British art dealers during the 1850s and 1860s before being bought by Francis Cook, 1st Baronet in 1868. It passed down through the Cook family until being entrusted to the trustees of the Cook Collection on the 3rd Baronet's death in 1939. The trustees sold it to the US art dealer Jacques Seligmann and Co in 1952, who sold it on to its present owner the following year.
