= Pierre-Joseph Lafontaine =

Belgian painter (1758–1835)

Pierre Joseph Lafontaine
- Born: Pierre Joseph Lafontaine; 18 August 1758; Courtrai, Austrian Netherlands
- Died: 12 January 1835 (aged 76); Paris, France
- Education: Académie Royale de Peinture of Paris
- Occupation: Painter

Pierre Joseph Lafontaine (18 July 1758 – 12 January 1835) was a Belgian painter, art historian and art dealer. He was most senior of the experts to the royal museums.

== Life ==
Born in Courtrai, he initially trained in that city's academy, where he studied under Jean Douelle (1755-1793), before joining the Académie Royale de Peinture in Paris. Greuze and Denon became his patrons in Paris. He exhibited at the Louvre between 1789 and 1806, presenting eight church interiors and one other painting in 1789, eleven paintings in 1791 and two church interiors in 1793, though the French Revolution prevented him from following an official career. He therefore became an art dealer working for French museums, travelling all across Europe in search of paintings, especially the Netherlands, where he acquired over one hundred paintings at public sales. For example, he found Rembrandt's The Woman Taken in Adultery in Belgium.

He did paint some architectural works, notably church and palace interiors with figures added by Demarne, Swebach and Taunay, and was heavily influenced by the work of the Neefs and Stenwijck families, gaining the nickname Lafontaine Peterneefs. Works by him are now in museums in Avignon, Orléans, Dijon, the Herzogliches Museum in Gotha, Courtrai, Lille, the Musée Carnavalet, the Louvre, at the Musee des Arts Décoratifs. He died in Paris in 1835.
