= Hendrik van Steenwijk II =

Dutch painter

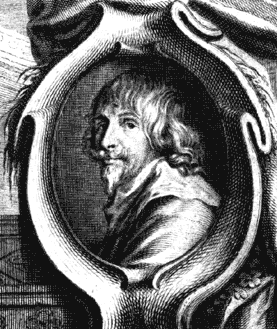
Hendrik van Steenwijk II (Book 3 of 4-volume painter biographies by Jean-Baptiste Descamps

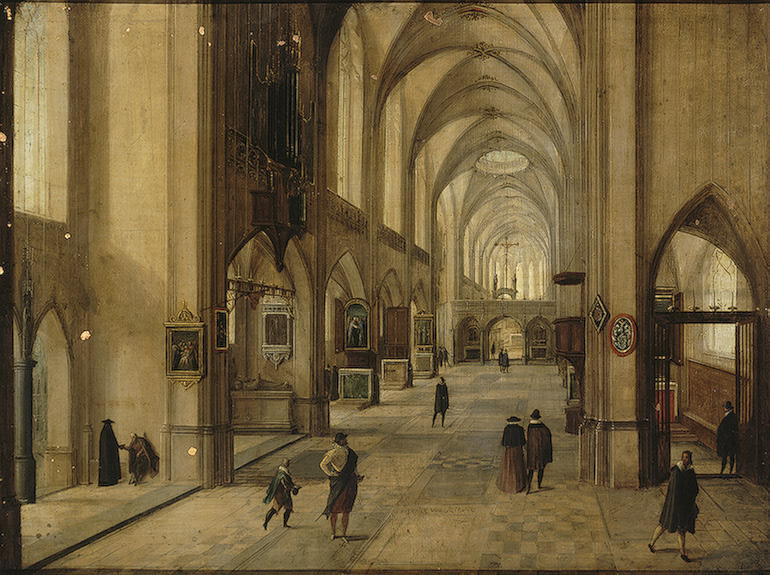
Interior of a Gothic-style church, possibly an artist impression for a new extension for the Hooglandsekerk in Leiden, dated 1604.

Hendrik van Steenwijck II (also Steenwyck, Steinwick) (c.1580–1640) was a Baroque painter mostly of architectural interiors, but also of biblical scenes and still lifes.

Van Steenwijck was born in Antwerp. His father, the Dutch painter Hendrik van Steenwijck I, one of the originators of the interiors genre, moved the family to Frankfurt am Main in 1585, where he trained his son. At his father's death in 1603, Van Steenwijck the Younger took over the studio in Frankfurt, but from 1604 until 1617 he was primarily active in Antwerp, where he collaborated with early Flemish Baroque painters such as Frans Francken I and Jan Brueghel the Elder.

Van Steenwijck is best known for the numerous imaginary interiors that were based on the Cathedral of Our Lady, Antwerp. These had an immediate influence on paintings by Pieter Neeffs I. After settling in London by 1617, he painted backgrounds for Anthony van Dyck and Daniel Mytens the Elder. Van Steenwijck moved to The Hague around 1638, where he was a painter at the court. His wife, Susanna van Steenwijk was also an architectural painter. She moved to Leiden around 1642. Van Steenwijck died in Leiden or The Hague.

== Notes ==
4. http://www.getty.edu/art/collection/artists/1155/hendrick-van-steenwijck-the-younger-flemish-1580-1649/
