= Susanna van Steenwijk =

Dutch artist

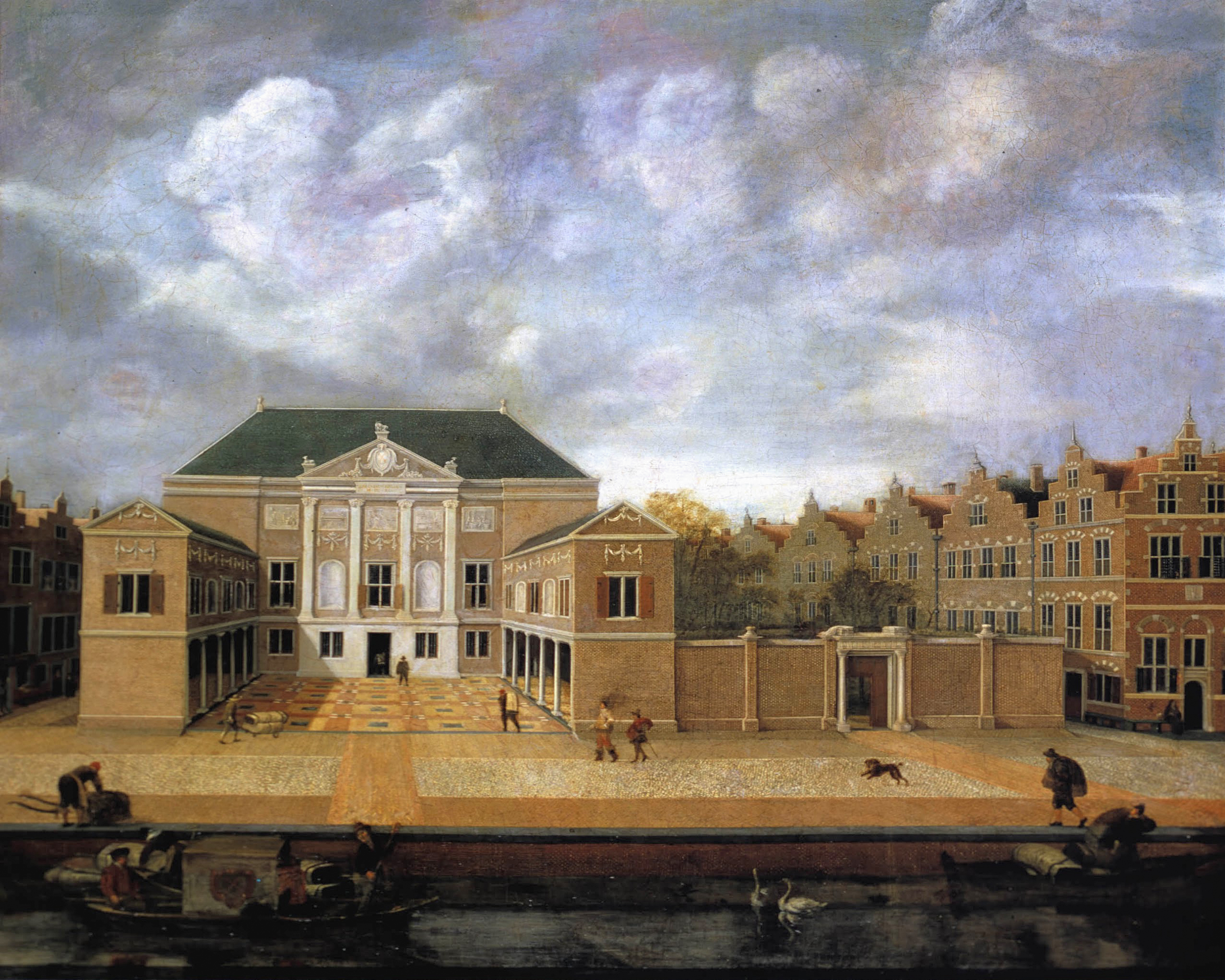
Stedelijk Museum De Lakenhal entrance in the former Cloth Hall of Leiden - 1642 painting by Susanna van Steenwijk.

Susanna van Steenwijk (born after 1601 as Susanna Gaspoel – probably buried 2 August 1664, Amsterdam) was a painter of small architectural exteriors active in Leiden and Amsterdam.

Susanna's father, Johan Gaspoel, was buried in 1622 in Westham in England, when his three children were not yet 21 years of age. In 1630 she married the architectural painter Hendrik van Steenwijk II, who was at least 20 years her elder. She baptized a son in Amsterdam in 1632 and one in Leiden in 1634.

Her known paintings are from the 1640s, and were made in Leiden and Amsterdam. Like her husband, she also made paintings of church interiors and a cabinet drawing of a church interior is known dated 1664 and signed "Susanna v. Steenwijk".

== Paintings ==
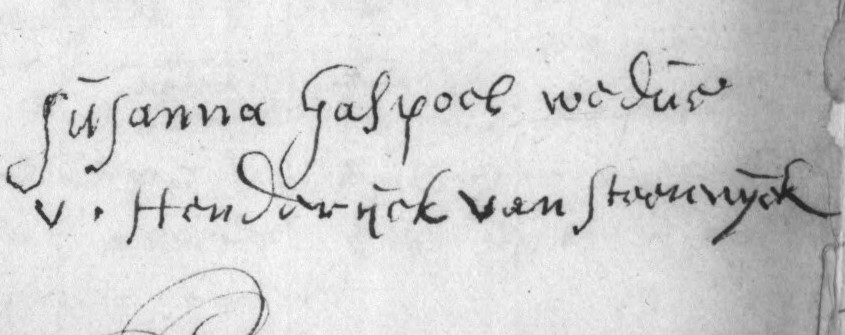
Autograph

Steenwijk being a local in Leiden was able to commission a piece in 1642 when the pure woolen industry took off. She created a painting of the brand new guildhall. She rendered the building in such a way that it emphasizes the architectural details, most likely due to her husband's architectural painting background leading her to take an interest in such details one might not normally. She also made sure to include the five sculptured plaques on the façade that gave insight on the cloth production process.
