= Adolf Seel =

German painter

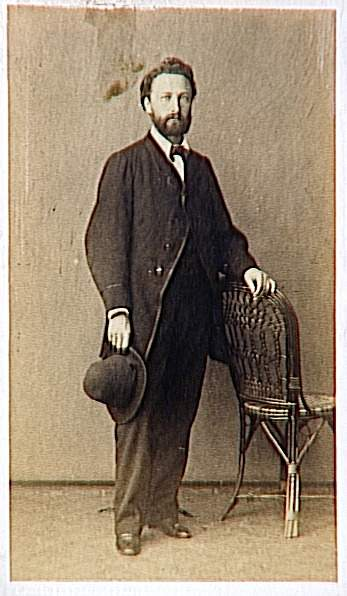
- Seel (date unknown)
- Born: 1 March 1829
- Died: 14 February 1907 (aged 77)
- Education: Düsseldorf Academy of Arts
- Known for: Painter, draughtsman, sculptor and print-maker
- Style: Düsseldorf school of painting
- Movement: Orientalist

Adolf Seel (1 March 1829–14 February 1907) was a German painter. He trained at the Düsseldorf Academy of Arts and is associated with the Düsseldorf school of painting.

== Biography ==
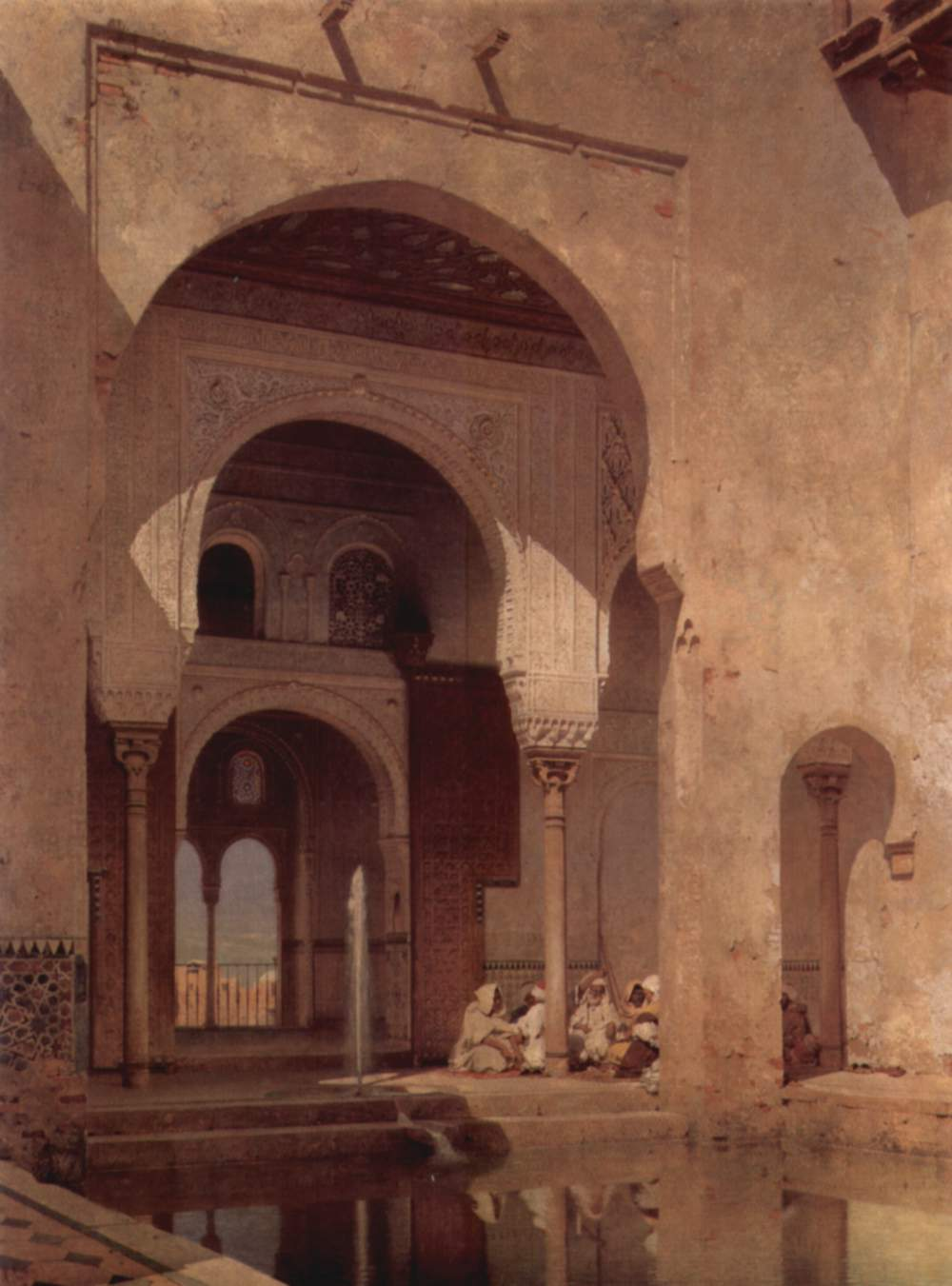
Alhambra

Seel visited the academy in Düsseldorf in 1844–50, where he trained under Wilhelm Sohn. He then continued to train one year in Paris, spent 1864 and 1865 in Italy, 1870 and 1871 Spain, Portugal, and the north coast of Africa as well as 1873 and 1874 the Orient, where he developed his preference for the architectural painting found rich food. Its pieces of architecture, particularly the Arab and Moorish buildings, are usually provided just as beautiful landscapes painted with a masterful perspective, lighting and coloring.

== Works ==
- Inside of a Byzantine church (1862),
- Motive from San Marco in Venice,
- The cloister of the cathedral to half in the winter (main picture),

And later:

- Taufkapelle in San Marco,
- Lion yard of the Alhambra,
- Arab yard in Cairo (1876, national gallery in Berlin) and
- The Egyptian Harem (1878).

== Awards ==
In 1876 he was awarded the golden medal of the city Vienna, 1878 the golden medal in Berlin.
