= Jacques de Lajoue =

French painter

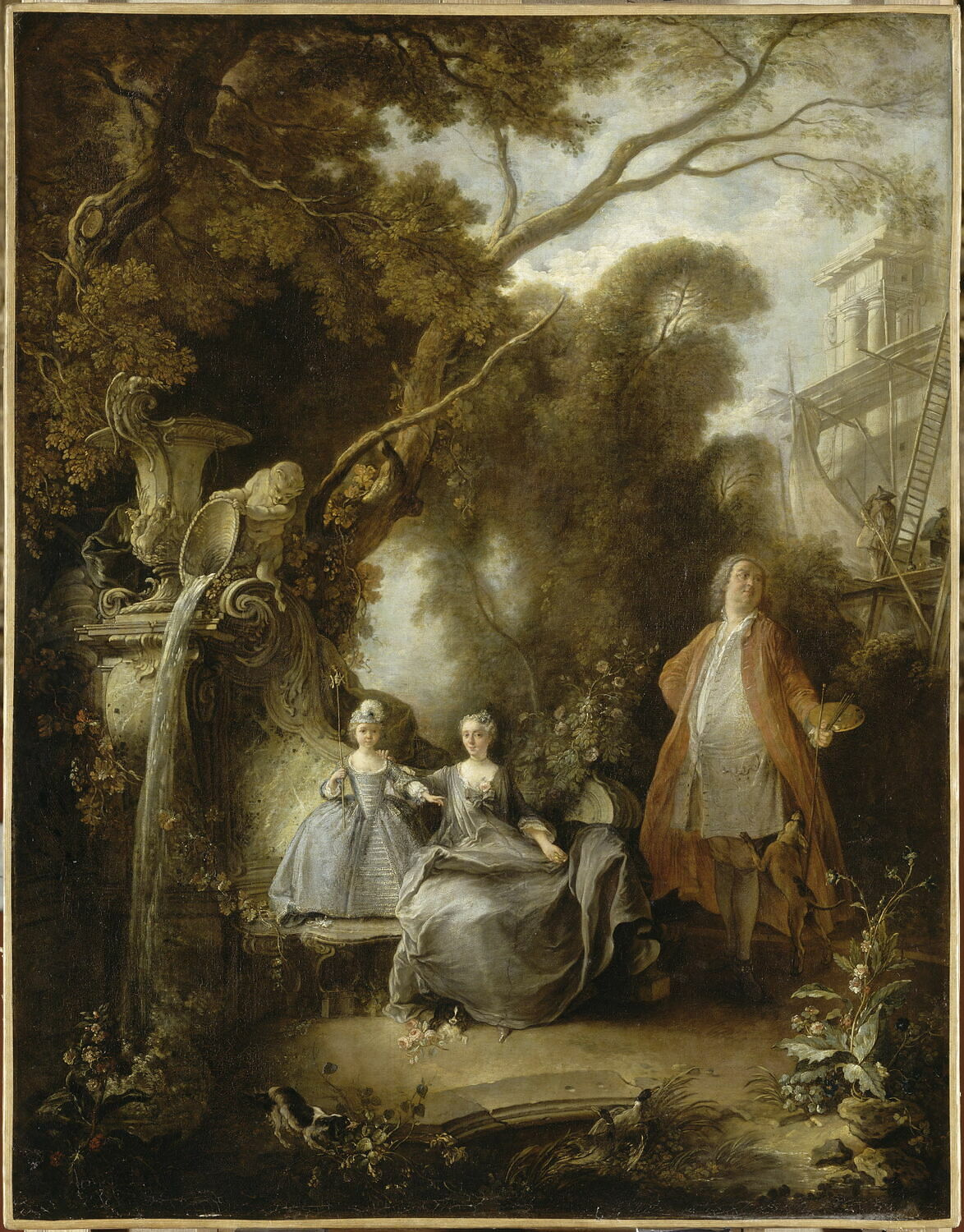
Self-portrait of Lajoue (right) with his wife Mariane Derlin and son Jacques-Gabriel (1730-1810), 1737

Jacques de Lajoue, a French architectural painter, was born in 1687 in Paris. He became a member of the Academy in 1721, and is noticed for a 'Perspective' which he executed in 1732 at the Library of St. Geneviève. He also designed the title-page to the works of Wouwerman. Etchings have been made after him by Cochin, Tardieu, and others. He died in Paris in 1761.

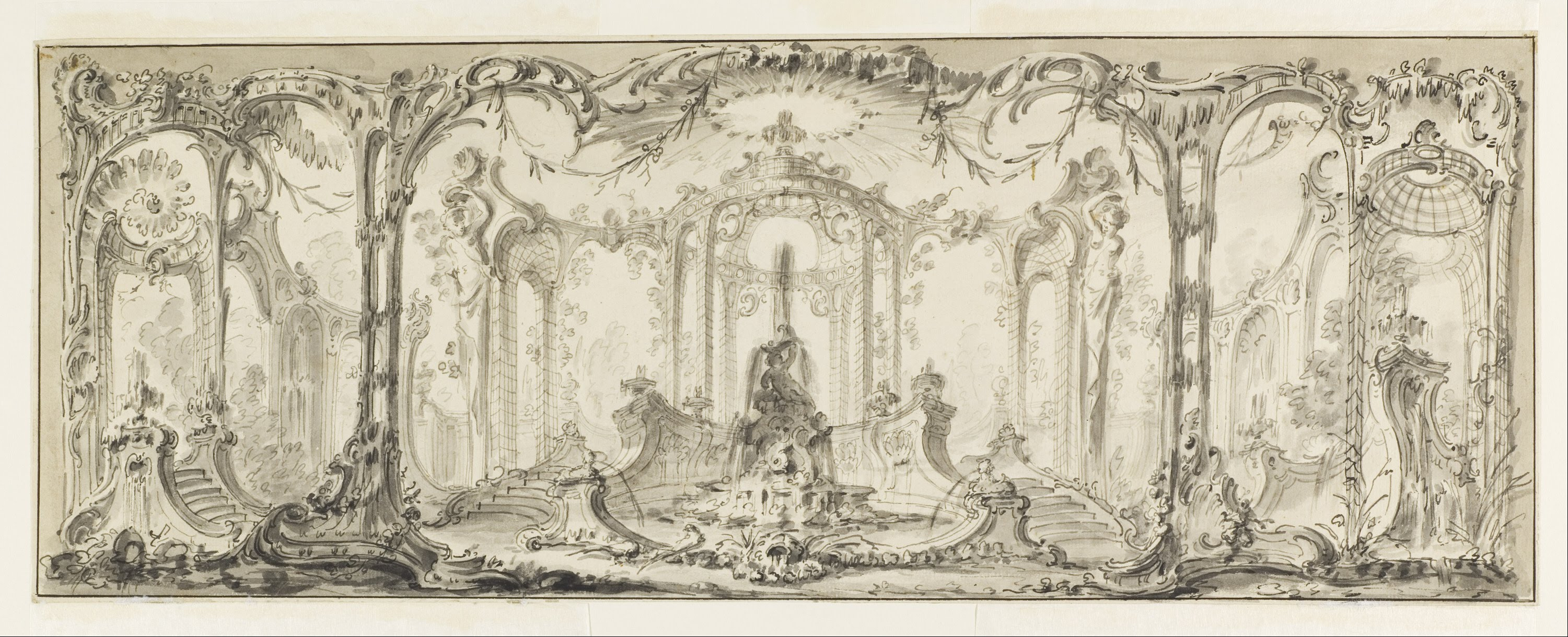
Design for an Ornamental Decoration (1740–60), pen and black ink, brush and gray wash on paper by Jacques de Lajoüe (Cooper–Hewitt, National Design Museum)
