= Lodewijck Neeffs =

Flemish baroque painter

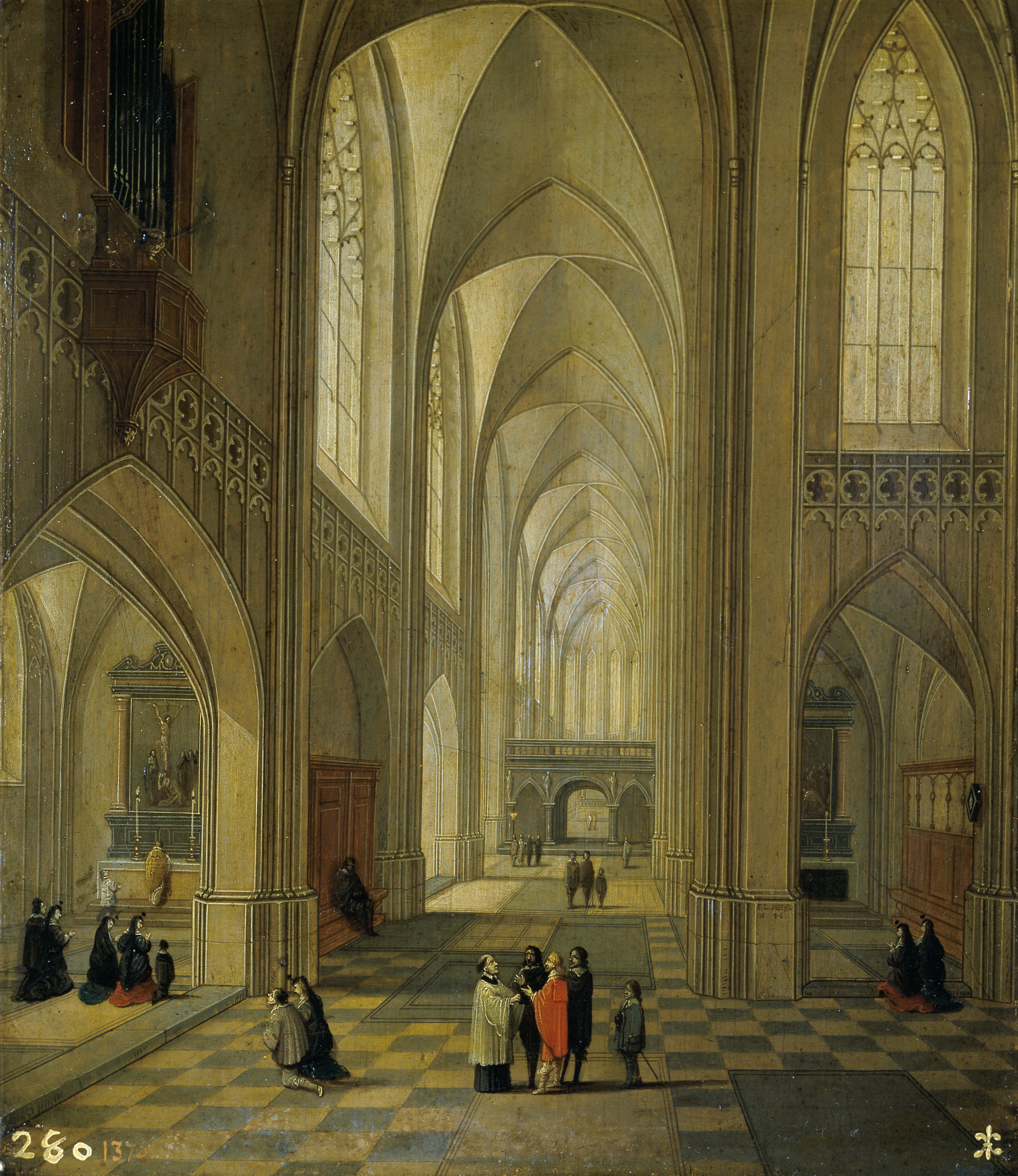
Interior of a Church, Museo del Prado, Madrid

Lodewijck Neeffs or Ludovicus Neeffs (22 January 1617 – 17 October 1649) was a Flemish Augustine monk and Baroque painter. He specialized in architectural interiors of churches. He is the least known of the Neeffs family of painters that was active in Antwerp. Several works attributed to either his father, Pieter the Elder or younger brother, Pieter the Younger might be by his hand.

== Life ==
Lodewijck Neeffs was baptized on 22 January 1617 in the Antwerp parish of Onze-Lieve-Vrouwe, North. His father was the painter Pieter the Elder and his mother Maria Louterbeens (Lauterbeens). He had a younger brother called Pieter who also was a painter. He trained and worked in his father's workshop, which specialised in paintings of architectural interiors, in particular of churches.

He joined the Augustinian order in Antwerp in 1644 but continued to practice painting. His profession as Augustinian monk took place on 29 May 1646. It is not unlikely that he produced works in his father's workshop and only began signing them with his own name after becoming a monk. His work was sought after by prominent collectors. One of his works was already in the königlichen Gemäldegalerie (Royal Painting Gallery) in Dresden before 1754. The two paintings in the Museo del Prado in Madrid are mentioned in the inventory of Isabel Farnese's collection as early as 1746. One of his interior views was published as an engraving.

Lodewijck Neeffs died young before he could develop his talent to the full. His death was recorded in the Obituarium of the Antwerp Augustinians on 17 October 1649, after only five years as a monk.

== Work ==
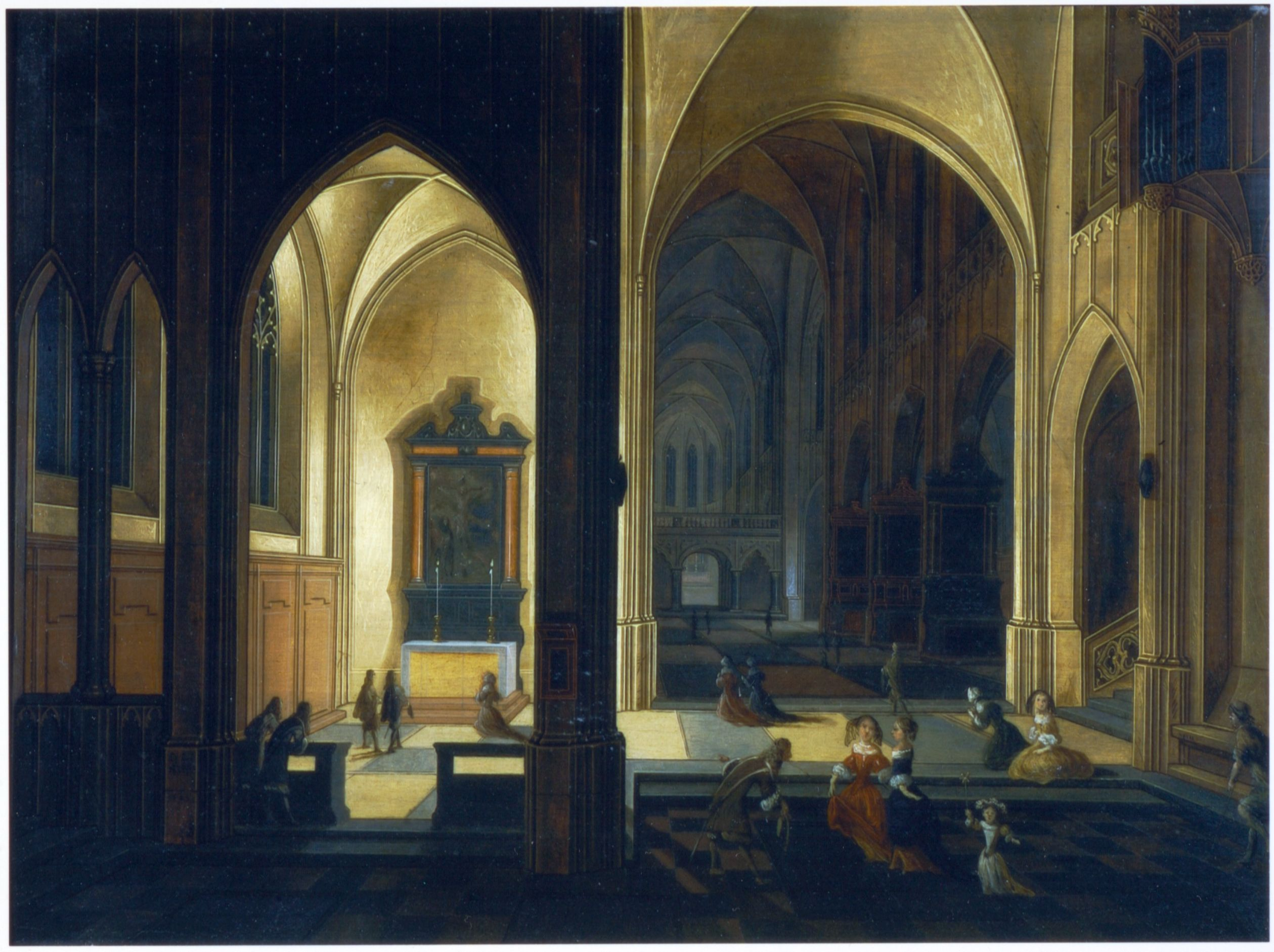
Interior of a Gothic Church by Candlelight

Neeffs specialised in architectural subjects, particularly Gothic church interiors. He likely only started signing his works after entering the monastery. Only about six paintings are attributed to him, most of them signed "Frater Lodevicus Neeffs" or with variations of this signature. A single work from 1641, i.e. before he joined the Augustinians, is signed "L. Neeffs A. 1641". It depicts an unidentified Baroque church. The closeness in style of the father and his two sons has created considerable confusion in attributing works among the family Neeffs painters. Lodewijk is considered never to have achieved the accuracy and refinement of his father's works.

Like his brother, Neeffs continued the tradition of the church interior in Antwerp in the manner created by his father and other artists of the previous generation like Hendrick van Steenwyck the Elder. His paintings show real as well as imaginary interiors of churches.

Neeffs collaborated with other artists who painted the staffage in his interior views. A collaboration with Frans Francken III is documented on the two church interiors in the Museo del Prado.
