= Noël Desenfans =

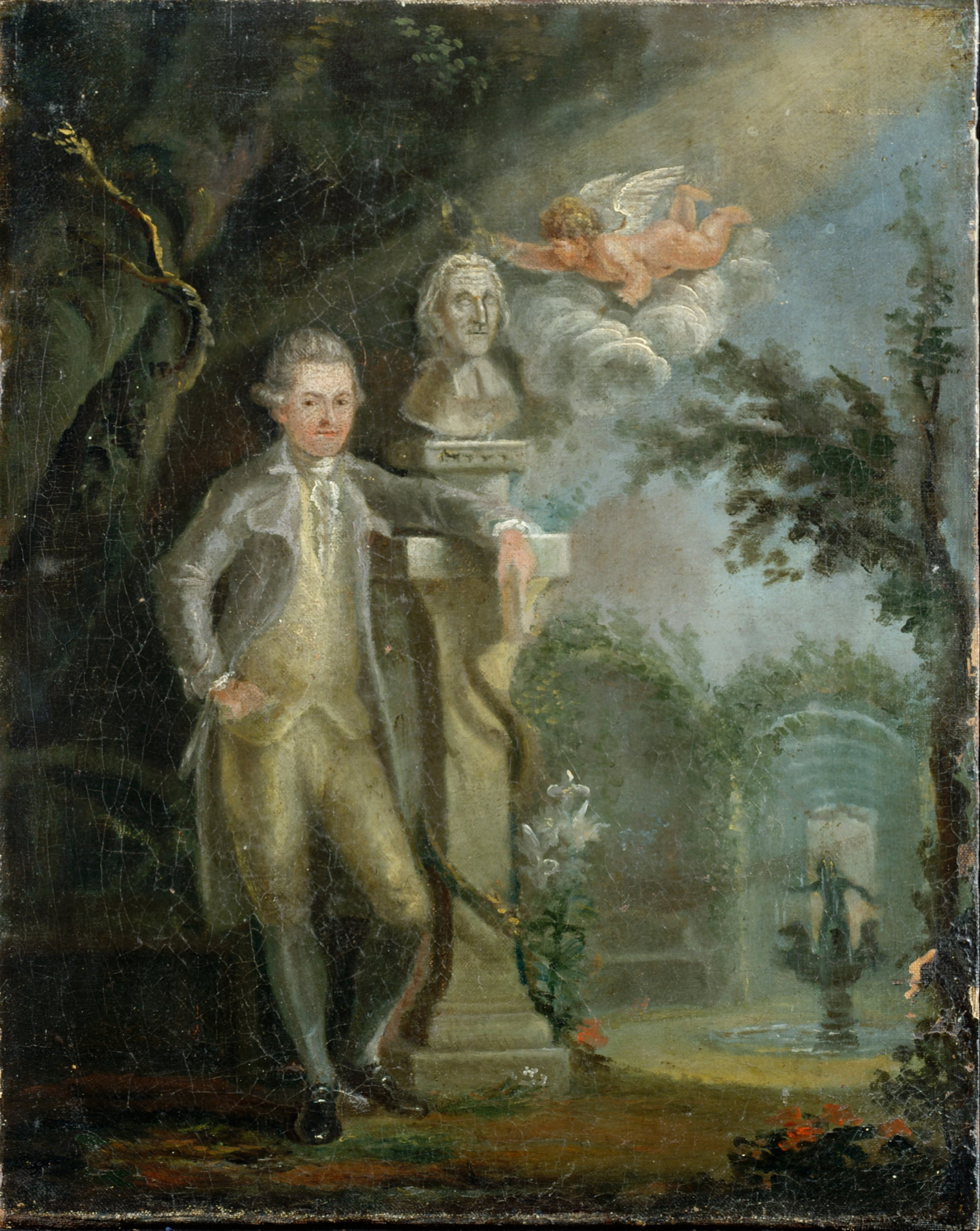
Noël Desenfans

Noël Desenfans (December 1741 – 8 July 1807) was a French-born art dealer mainly active in Britain, most notable for laying the foundation for the Dulwich Picture Gallery in London alongside the landscape painter Francis Bourgeois.

== Life ==
Born in Avesnes-sur-Helpe and studying in Douai and Paris, he initially aimed to become a playwright but in 1769 instead settled in London to become a language teacher. There, in 1776, he married the wealthy Margaret Morris (1731–1813), sister of Sir John Morris of Claremont, Glamorganshire. That wealth allowed him to enter the art trade, a sphere first suggested to him by his buying a Claude and selling it on to George III, though he always presented himself more as an art lover than a determined dealer, decorating his home with a wide selection of paintings and keeping in touch with the literary and artistic scene. For over thirty years he mainly worked with the French dealer Jean-Baptiste-Pierre Lebrun (1748–1813).

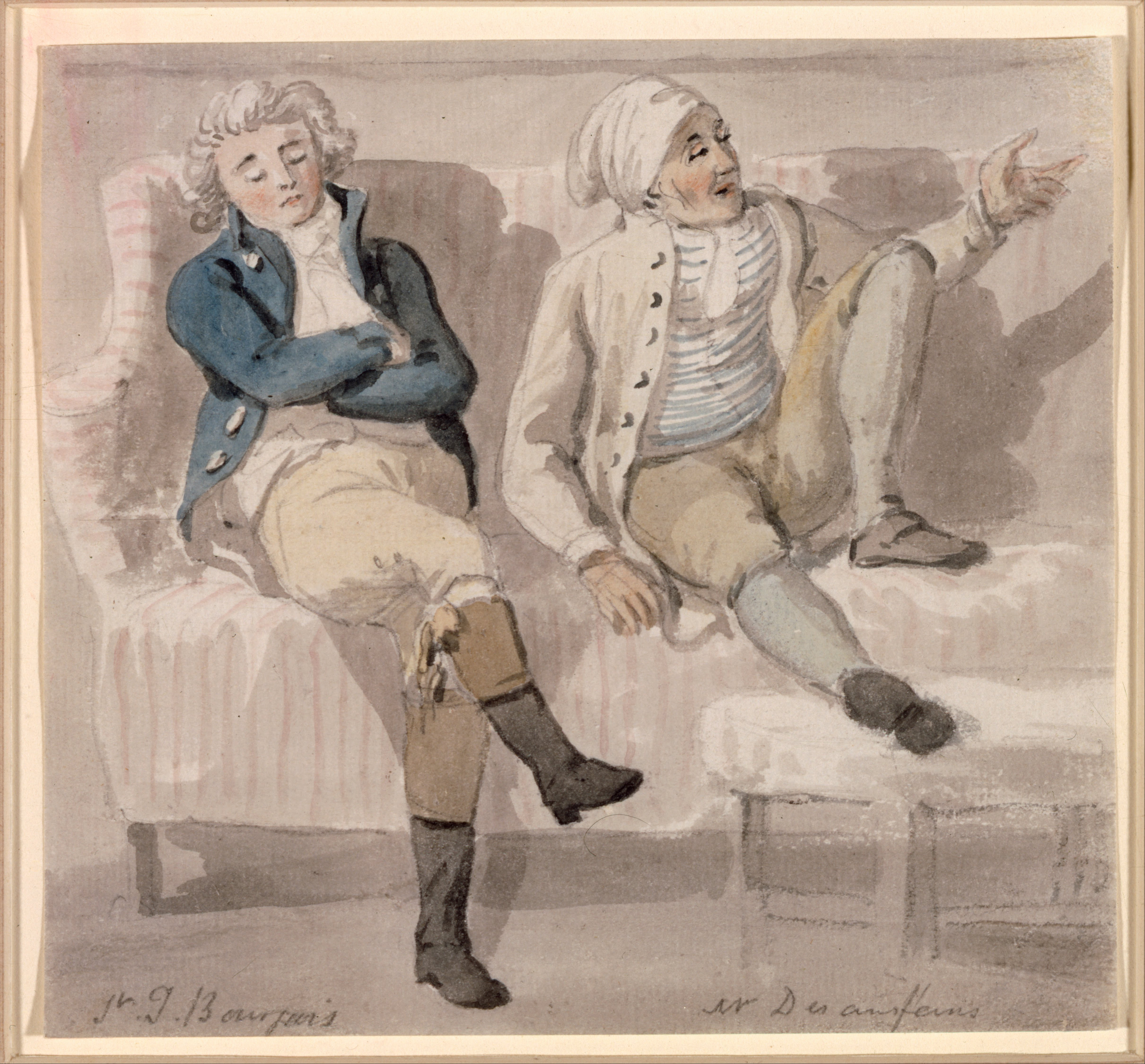
Francis Bourgeois and Noël Desenfans

By 1776 at the latest he was a patron of Bourgeois, who moved into Desenfans's home that year and assisted him in his art dealing. In 1790 the pair were commissioned by Stansilaus II August Poniatowski to form an art collection for his court in Poland and despite the French Revolution and the ensuing wars they were able to travel across Europe in 1790–1795 collecting 190 works. However, the Third Partition of Poland led to Stanislaus's abdication and loss of interest in the project, with his death in 1798 extinguishing the last hope of payment for them (Desenfans is said to have personally ploughed £9,000 into the project). Desenfans offered them as a British national gallery in 1799, publishing "A Plan, preceded by a Short Review of the Fine Arts" in support of this proposal, but was turned down. Attempts to sell the collection to the Tsar of Russia failed and an 1802 auction proved unprofitable, though for that sale he did produce a two-volume "Descriptive Catalogue" of the works.

Desenfans seems to have withdrawn from art dealing in 1803 due to illness, drawing up his will on 8 October that year, leaving the rest of his property to Bourgeois and his wife but around 350 paintings to Bourgeois alone. He died in London in 1807 and was initially buried in a mausoleum on his property on Portland Place in London, before being reinterred at the new picture gallery in Dulwich alongside Bourgeois and his wife.
