= Pieter Neefs the Younger =

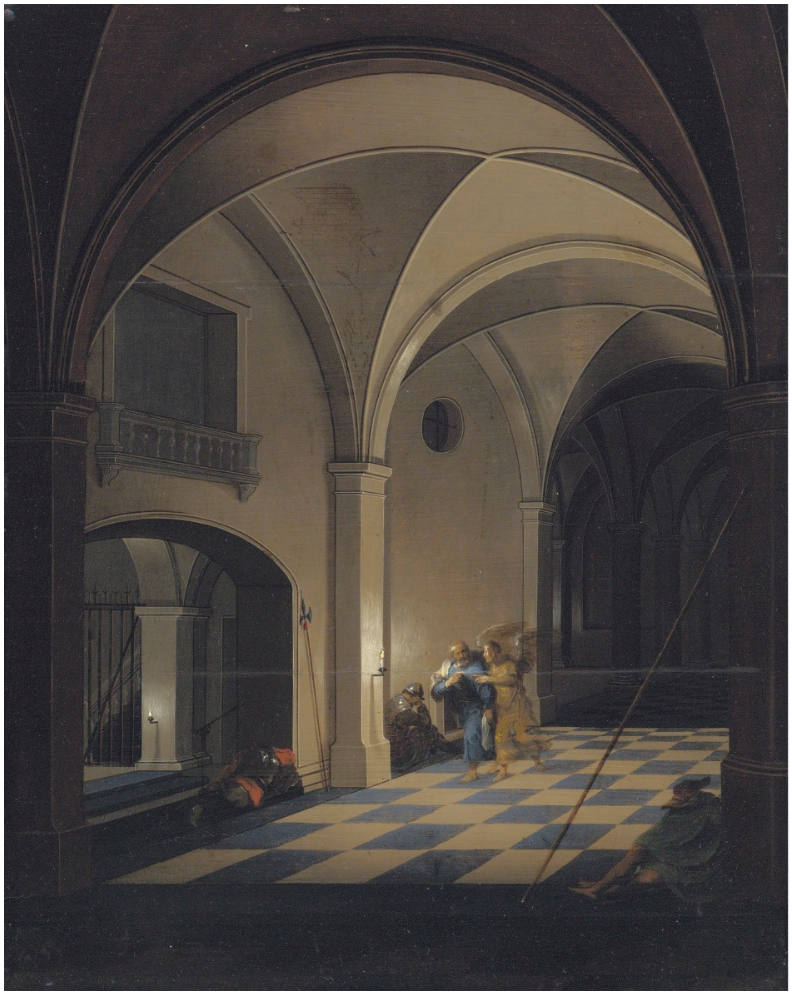
Prison interior with St Peter fleeing with the angel

Pieter Neefs the Younger or Pieter Neeffs the Younger (bapt. 23 May 1620 – after 1675) was a Flemish painter who mainly specialized in architectural interiors of churches. Son of the prominent architectural painter Pieter Neefs the Elder he started out working in his father's workshop in Antwerp. He collaborated with various leading staffage painters to create lively church interiors.

== Life ==
Pieter Neefs the Younger was baptized in Antwerp on 23 May 1620. His father was the painter Pieter Neefs the Elder and his mother Maria Louterbeens.

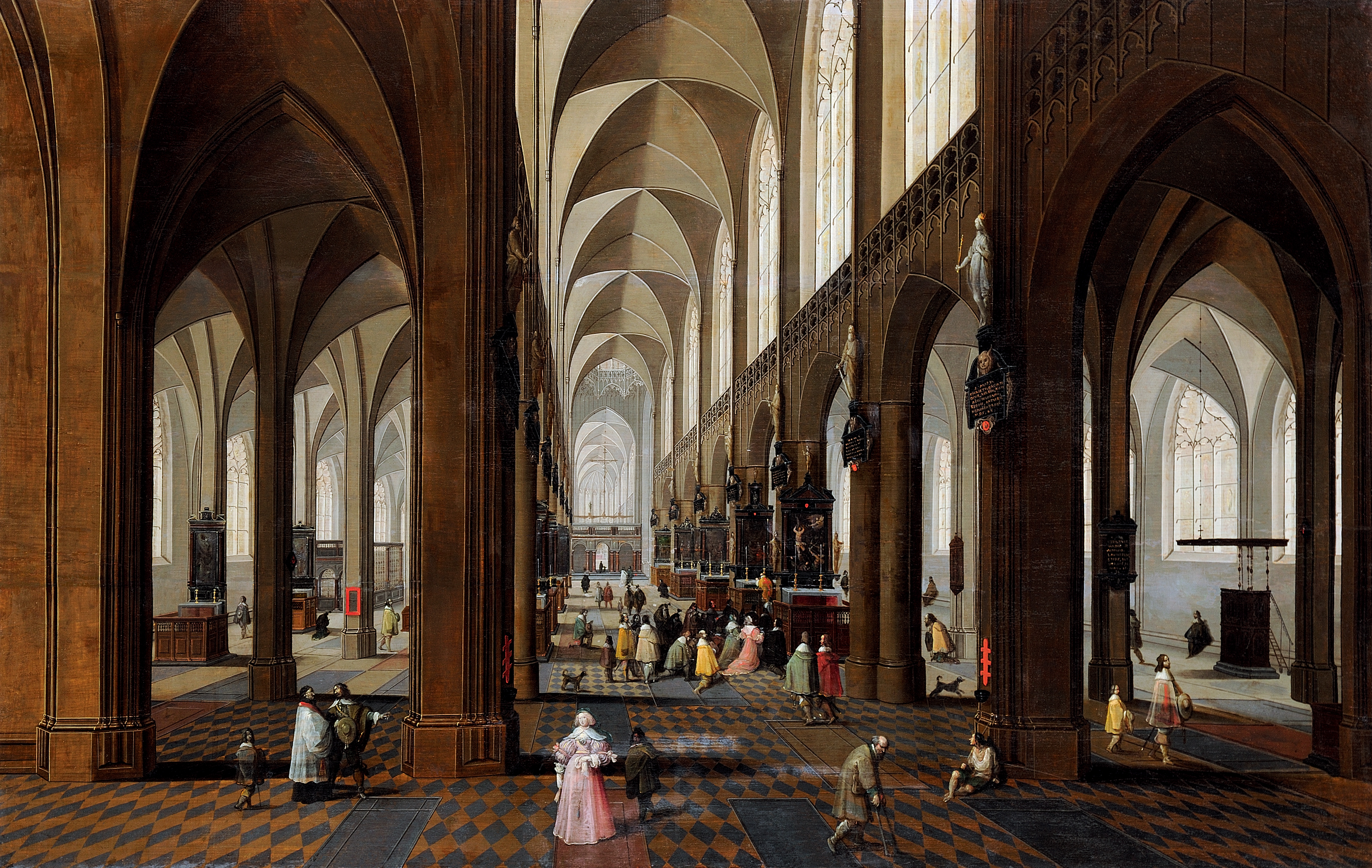
The nave of Antwerp Cathedral

Pieter had four siblings of whom his older brother Lodewijk also became a painter. The two brothers both trained with their father and as a result, their works were very close to their father's, and attributions of their individual hands can be difficult. After the death of their father sometime after 1656, the sons took over the family workshop.

Pieter Neefs the Younger appears never to have become a member of the Antwerp Guild of Saint Luke. While unusual, he was likely never admitted because he was working in his father's workshop.

The last date on which he is known to have been active is 1675, a date found on a picture formerly in Vienna (Vaduz, Liechtenstein Museum).

== Work ==
Pieter the Younger specialised in architectural subjects, particularly Gothic church interiors and some dungeon interiors. His earliest extant work is dated 1646.

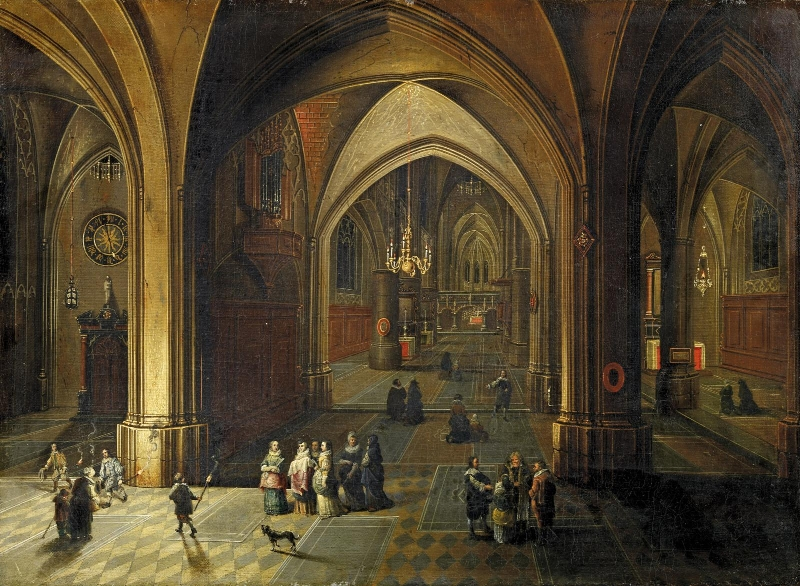
Interior of a church lit at night

Pieter Neefs the Younger continued the tradition of the church interior in Antwerp in the manner created by his father and other artists of the previous generation like Hendrick van Steenwyck the Elder. His paintings show real as well as imaginary interiors of churches. The interior of Antwerp Cathedral was one of his preferred subjects and many of his imaginary church interiors are a pastiche of elements of Antwerp Cathedral. Like his father, he painted several nocturnal scenes of church interiors sometimes paired with daylight renderings of the same scenes. An example is the pair of Interiors of a Gothic Church in the Museum of Fine Arts in Budapest showing a diurnal and nocturnal view of two gothic churches with slightly different interiors.

Neefs the Younger collaborated with a number of different artists, in the first place his own father. The closeness in style of father and son and the fact that the two artists used a similar signature have created considerable confusion in attributing works to either artist. Some attributions are based on the dress of the figures depicted in the compositions. This is for example the case with the Interior of a Cathedral, Night Scene (c. 1660, Victoria and Albert Museum) which was attributed to Pieter the Younger as the dress of the characters in the composition were identified as being fashionable during the 1660s, a time by which is father is deemed to have been deceased.

The other artists with whom Neefs the Younger collaborated included Frans Francken III, David Teniers the Younger and Bonaventura Peeters the Elder who provided the staffage to his interiors. His output was as large as that of his father.

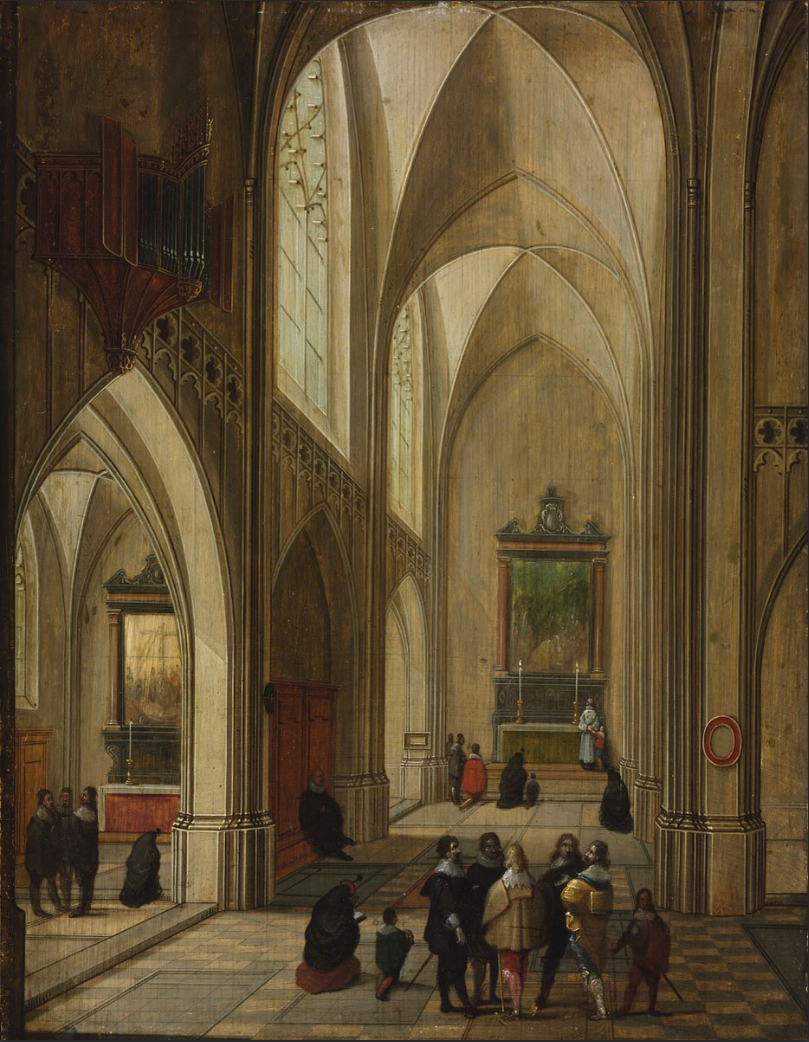
Interior of a Gothic Church in Day Light

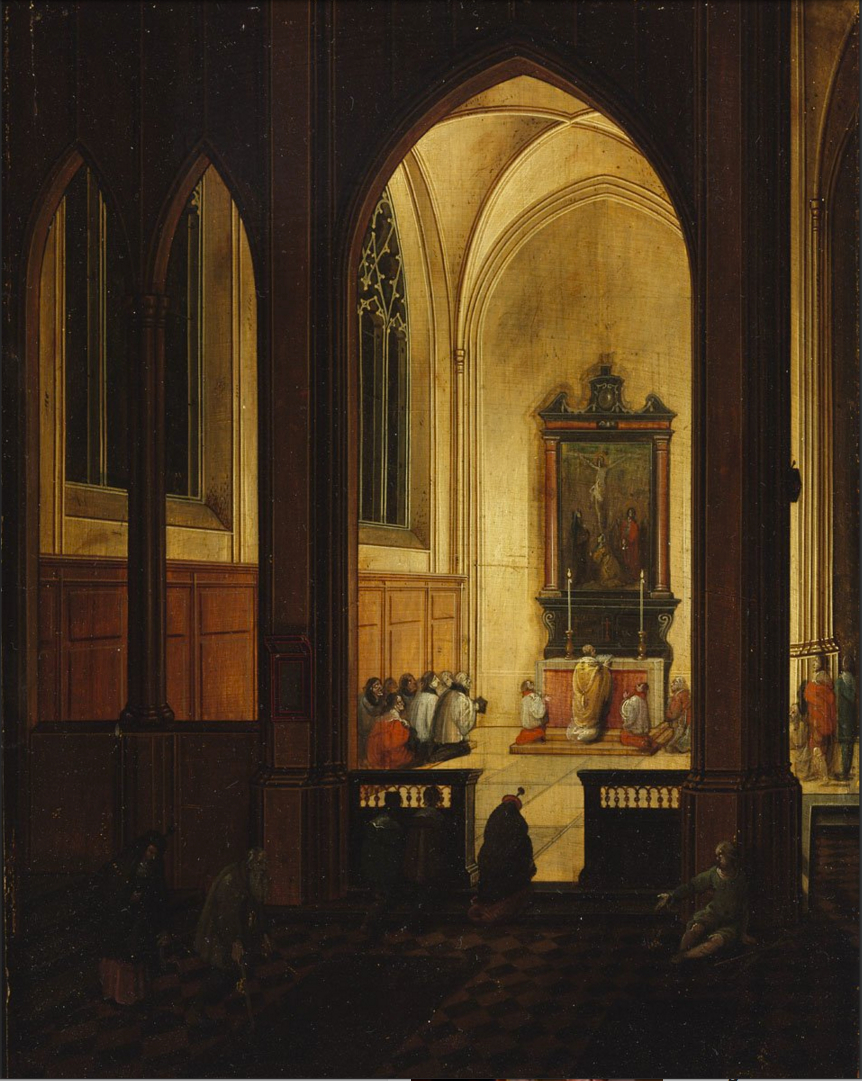
Interior of a Gothic Church at Night

Father and son van Steenwijck and the two generations of the family Neefs painters are considered to be representatives of the Antwerp school of architectural painting. Typical for their style was the use of a rigid linear perspective which offers a view directly down the nave of the church. This style was also adopted by the Dutch painters Dirck van Delen and Bartholomeus van Bassen.

The works of Pieter Neefs the Elder and Younger have been called propaganda for the Catholic Counter Reformation. They typically show the interior of churches loosely based on Antwerp Cathedral in which the whole panoply of Catholic ecclesiastical activity is going on, in particular, the Catholic sacraments such as baptism, communion, marriage, Mass, confession, the giving of alms, etc. All of these activities were often included in a single composition in a church swarming with priests and bristling with statues and paintings. This stands in sharp contrast with the purged interiors of the churches in the Protestant Dutch Republic painted by Dutch painters of the time such as Emanuel de Witte, Gerrit Berckheyde and Gerrit Houckgeest.
