= Friedrich August Elsasser =

German painter

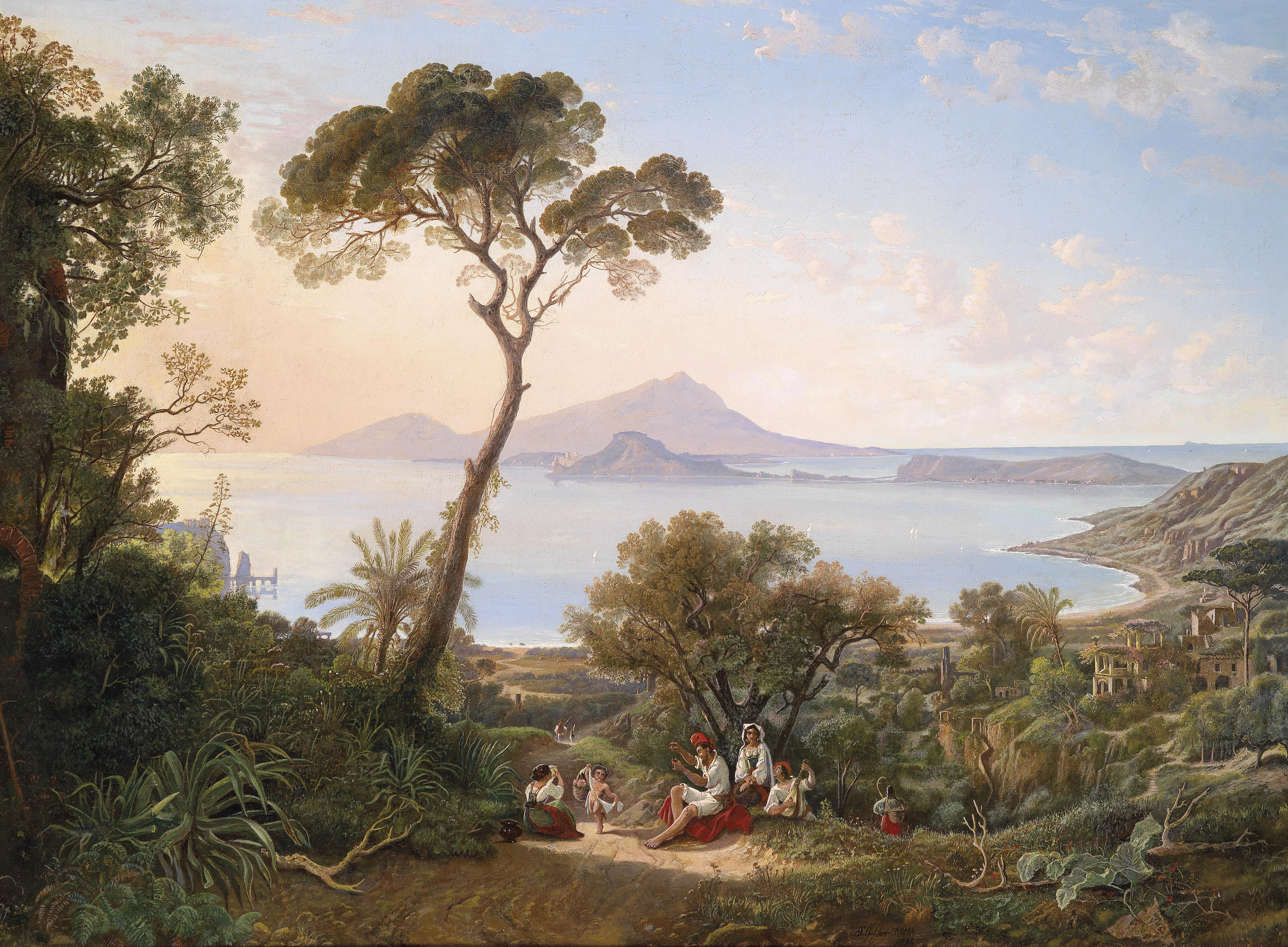
View from Posillipo to Bagnoli, Procida, Cape Miseno on the left of the painting, and Niceda (1836)

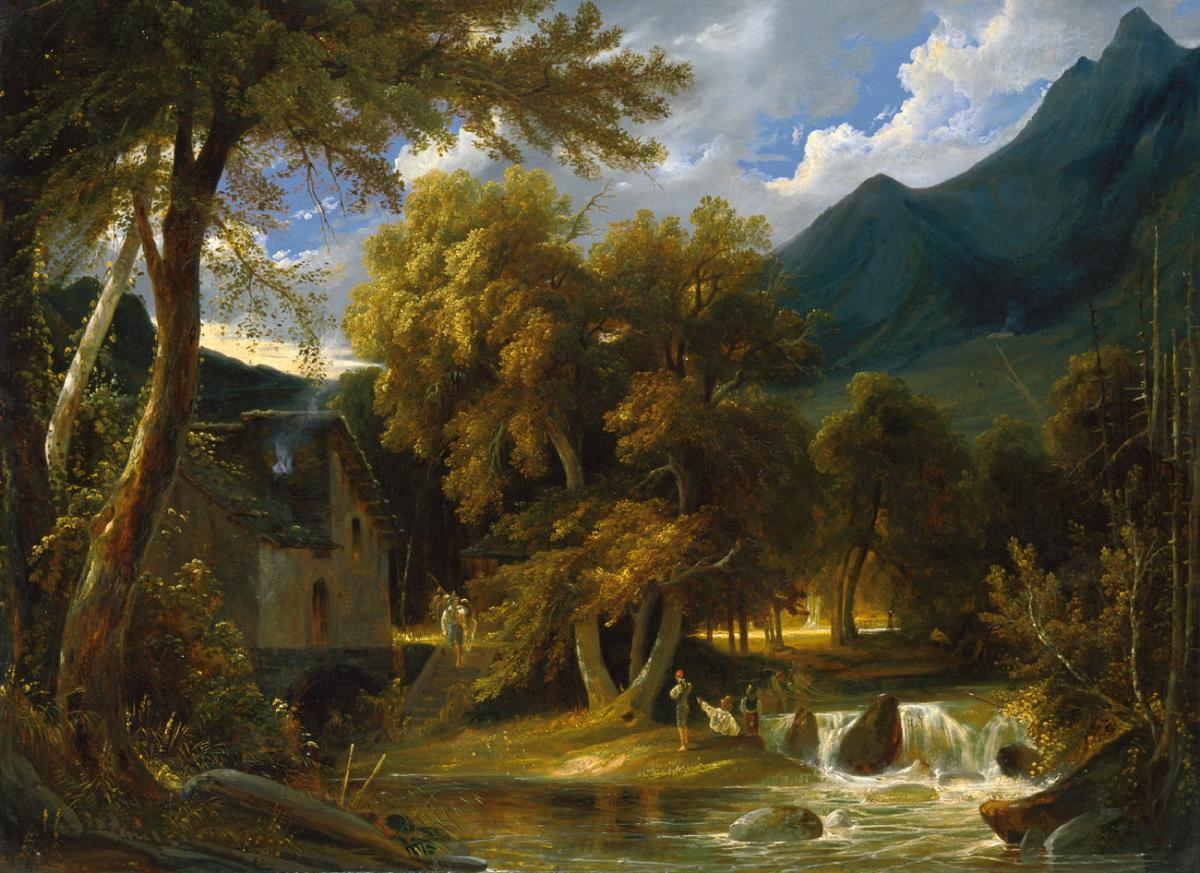
Southern landscape

Friedrich August Elsasser (1810–1845), a painter of landscapes and architectural views, was born at Berlin and studied at the Academy of that city under Carl Blechen, whose influence on art was at that time very great. In 1831 he went to Italy, and in 1834 and 1835 he visited Sicily.

Among his choicest works are The Forest of Calabria, The Interior of a Church at Palermo, and A View of the Ruins at Rome. The King of Prussia sent him the Order of the Red Eagle, and granted him a pension for life, which he did not long enjoy, as he died in 1845 in Rome. His brothers, Heinrich and Julius Elsasser, were also landscape painters. The latter was born in Berlin in 1816 and died in Rome in 1859.

== Works ==
- Palermo
- Lago dei Nemi
- Campo santo bei Pisa im Mondlicht
- Sibyllengrotte in Tivoli
- Klostergang in Cefalu
- Innere der beleuchteten Peterskirche
- Theater von Taormina

== See also ==
- List of German painters
