= Pieter Neefs the Elder =

Flemish painter

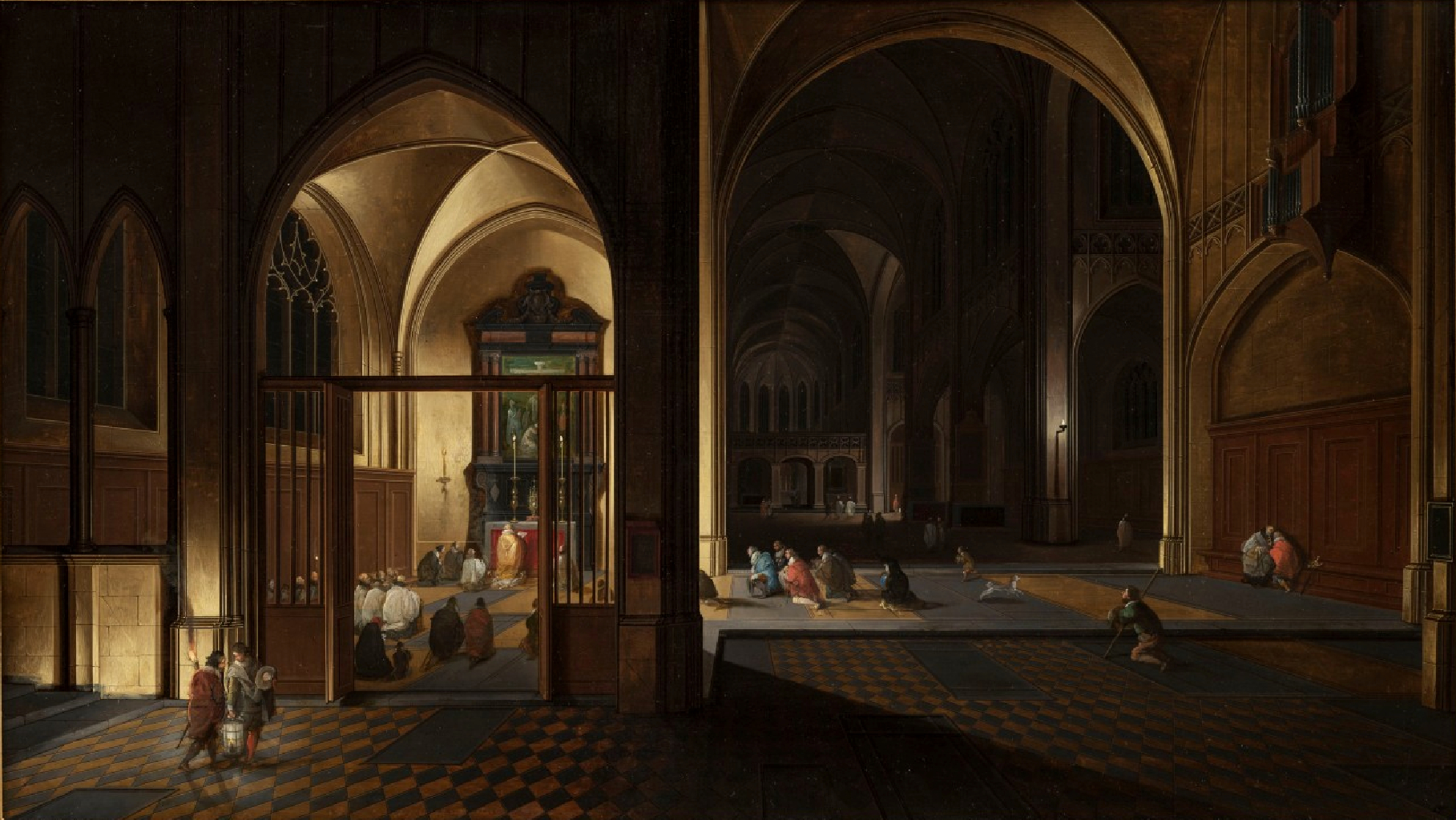
Church interior

Pieter Neefs the Elder or Pieter Neeffs the Elder (c. 1578 in Antwerp – after 1656 before 1661 in Antwerp) was a Flemish painter who specialized in architectural interiors of churches. Active in Antwerp, he was influenced by the works of the Dutch architectural painters Hendrik van Steenwijk the Elder and the Younger. His principal contribution to the genre were his nocturnal church interiors lit by two light sources.

== Life ==
The year of birth of Pieter Neefs is not known with certainty. It is placed some time between 1578 and 1590. He is believed to have been born in Antwerp. His father was Aart Neefs, a cloth merchant and innkeeper who had difficulty making ends meet after losing most of his fortune during the Spanish Fury. Pieter's mother was Margaretha Verspreet.

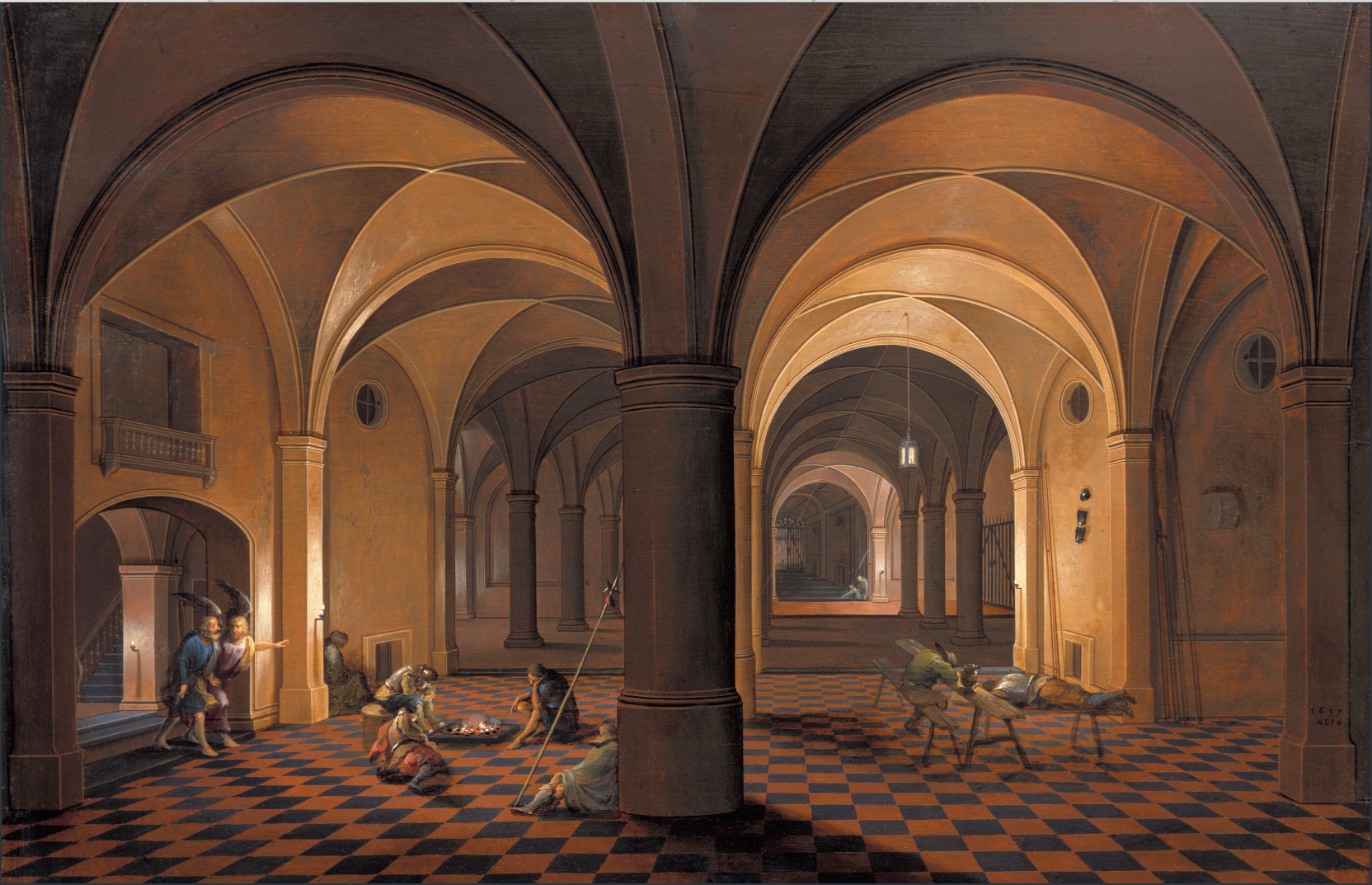
Liberation of Saint Peter

The name of the teacher of Pieter Neefs has not been preserved, In 1610 Pieter became a free master of the Antwerp Guild of St Luke. He established himself as a specialist of church interiors, a genre that had been relatively little practiced in Flanders before him. He became so successful with his architectural paintings that he was able to get leading Antwerp painters to paint the staffage in his works.

Pieter Neefs married Maria Louterbeens on 30 April 1612. The couple had five children of whom the second and third-born Lodewijk and Pieter became painters. Their works were very close to their father's, and attributions of their individual hands can be difficult.

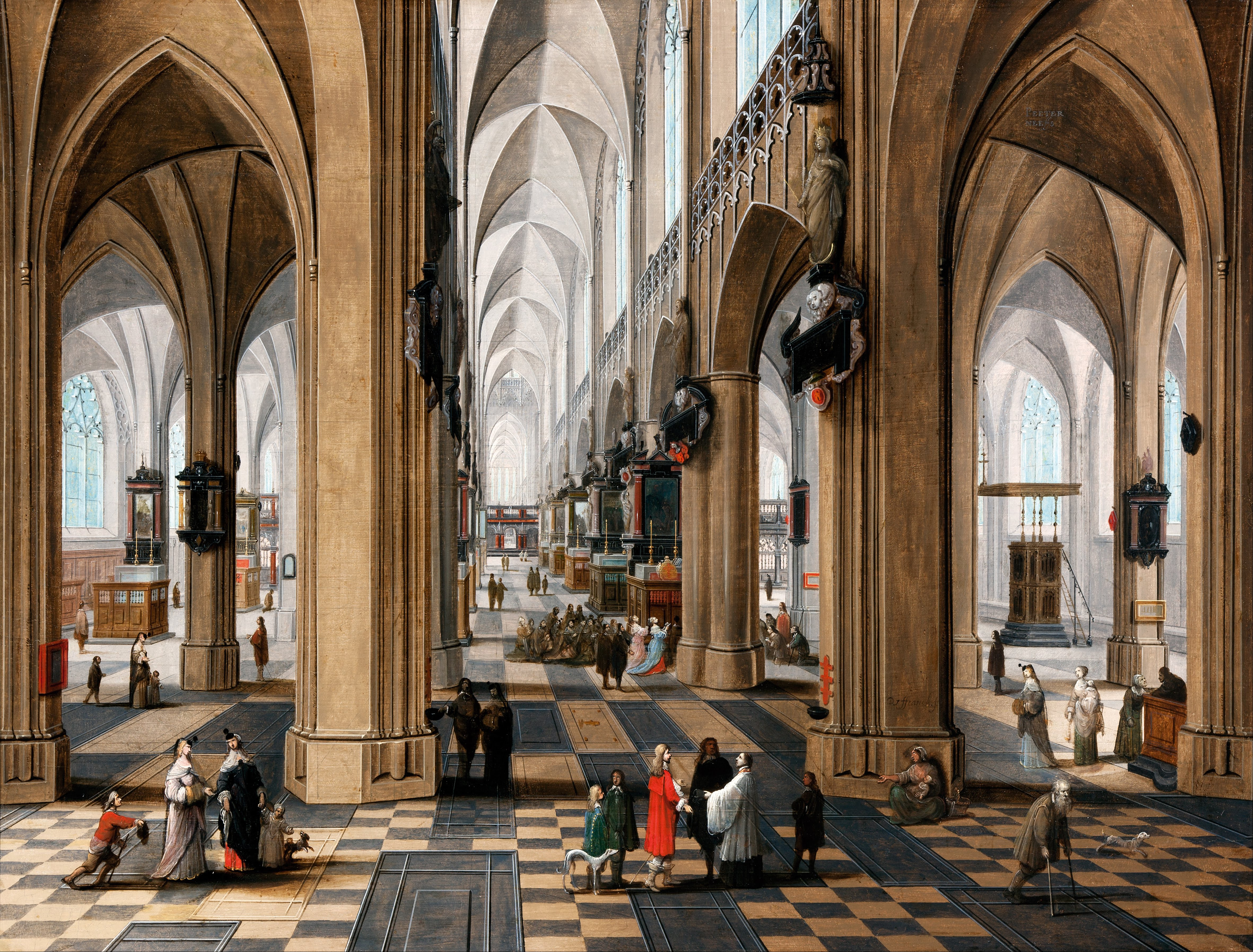
A church interior with elegant figures strolling and figures attending mass

Despite his success Pieter Neefs appears to have suffered financial difficulties. His only pupil was Laureis de Cater, who turned out to have insufficient talent to become admitted as a master to the Guild.

The artist died some time between February 1656, when he is recorded dealing with an inheritance, and 1661, when he is recorded as deceased by the biographer Cornelis de Bie in the volume of his Het Gulden Cabinet, which appeared in 1661.

== Work ==
Pieter Neefs the Elder was a specialist of architectural interiors. His most frequent subject is the interior of churches and cathedrals. He also painted a few interiors of dungeons. His works depict existing churches as well as imaginary churches. On a few occasions he signed his works with den auden neefs (the old Neefs). Generally speaking, the works he made before c. 1640 when his son Pieter the Younger became involved in the workshop are superior in quality. It is possible that works attributed to either Pieter the Elder and the Younger are, in fact, by Lodewijjk of Ludovicus, the least-known member of the Neefs family.

His works show the influence of the Dutch painters Hendrik van Steenwijk I the Elder and the Younger, in particular of the latter. This has led to the assumption by some art historians that he may have studied under either of these artists. Pieter Neefs is known to have painted several copies of Steenwyck compositions, including his earliest dated church interior of 1605.

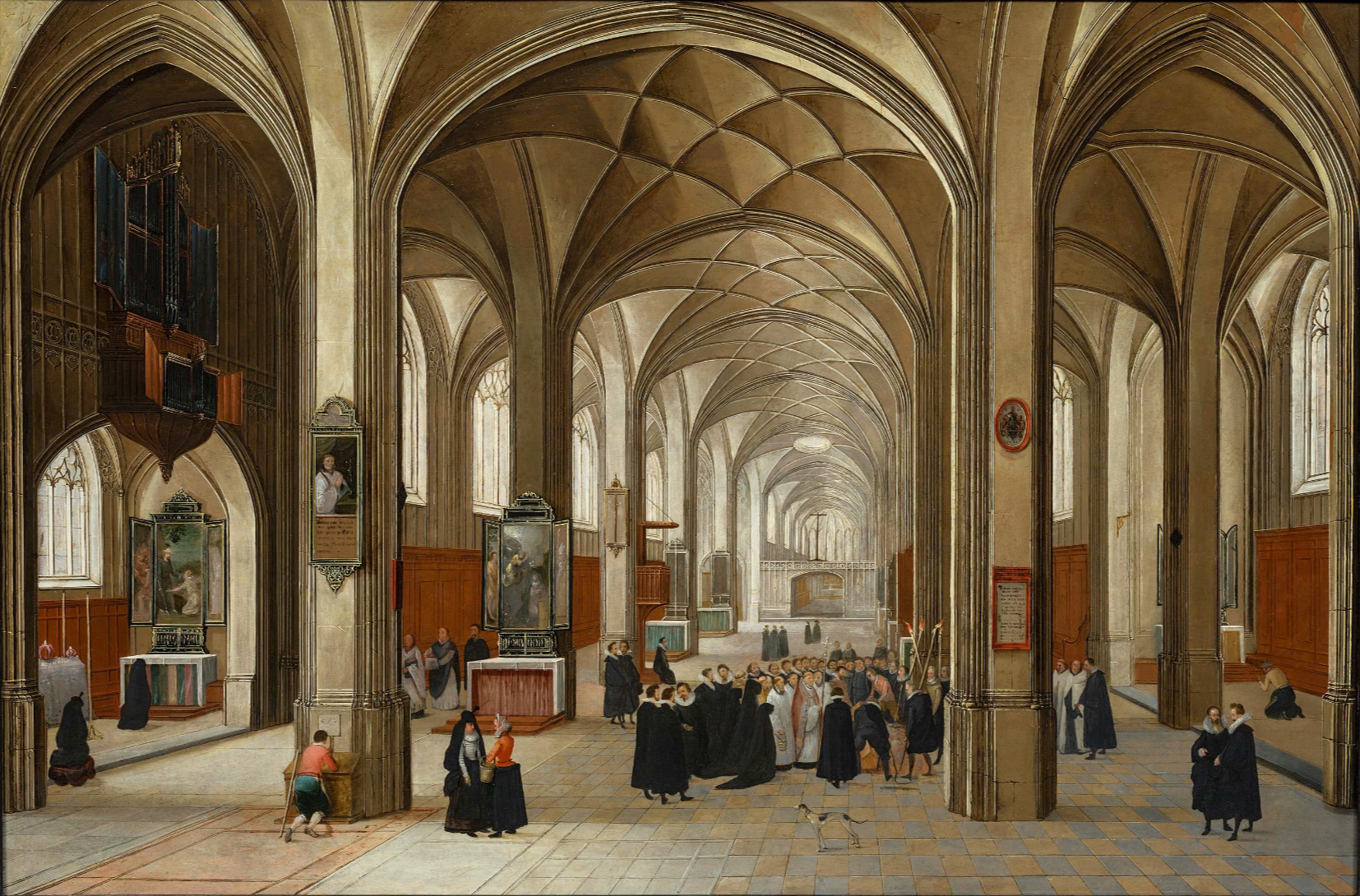
Interior of a Gothic Church

Father and son van Steenwijck and the two generations of the family Neefs painters are considered to be representatives of the Antwerp school of architectural painting. Typical for their style was the use of a rigid linear perspective which offers a view directly down the nave of the church. This style was also adopted by the Dutch painters Dirck van Delen and Bartholomeus van Bassen.

Neefs' compositions are characterised by their deeply receding spaces, created through the use of linear perspective and contrasting areas of light and dark. Neefs was very skilled in the handling of tonal variety and by moving from light to shade he was able to bring into play the effect of outside or internal light on the church interior. Neefs took this variation in his treatment of light further still, by often depicting nocturnal scenes in church interiors. While nocturnal scenes of church interiors were likely an innovation of Hendrick van Steenwyck the Elder, Pieter Neefs became one of the principal practitioners of the genre. An important proportion of his work is devoted to such views. Some of these nocturnal scenes were intended as pendants to daylight scenes.

Many of Neefs' painting drew inspiration from the Cathedral of Antwerp, in particular its vast nave. However, rarely did he create realistic depictions of existing architectural structures. Most of his compositions depict imaginary churches, which are often more or less loosely based on real church structures. Neefs would vary elements of the architecture of actual churches to which he added paintings and sculptural details of his own invention.

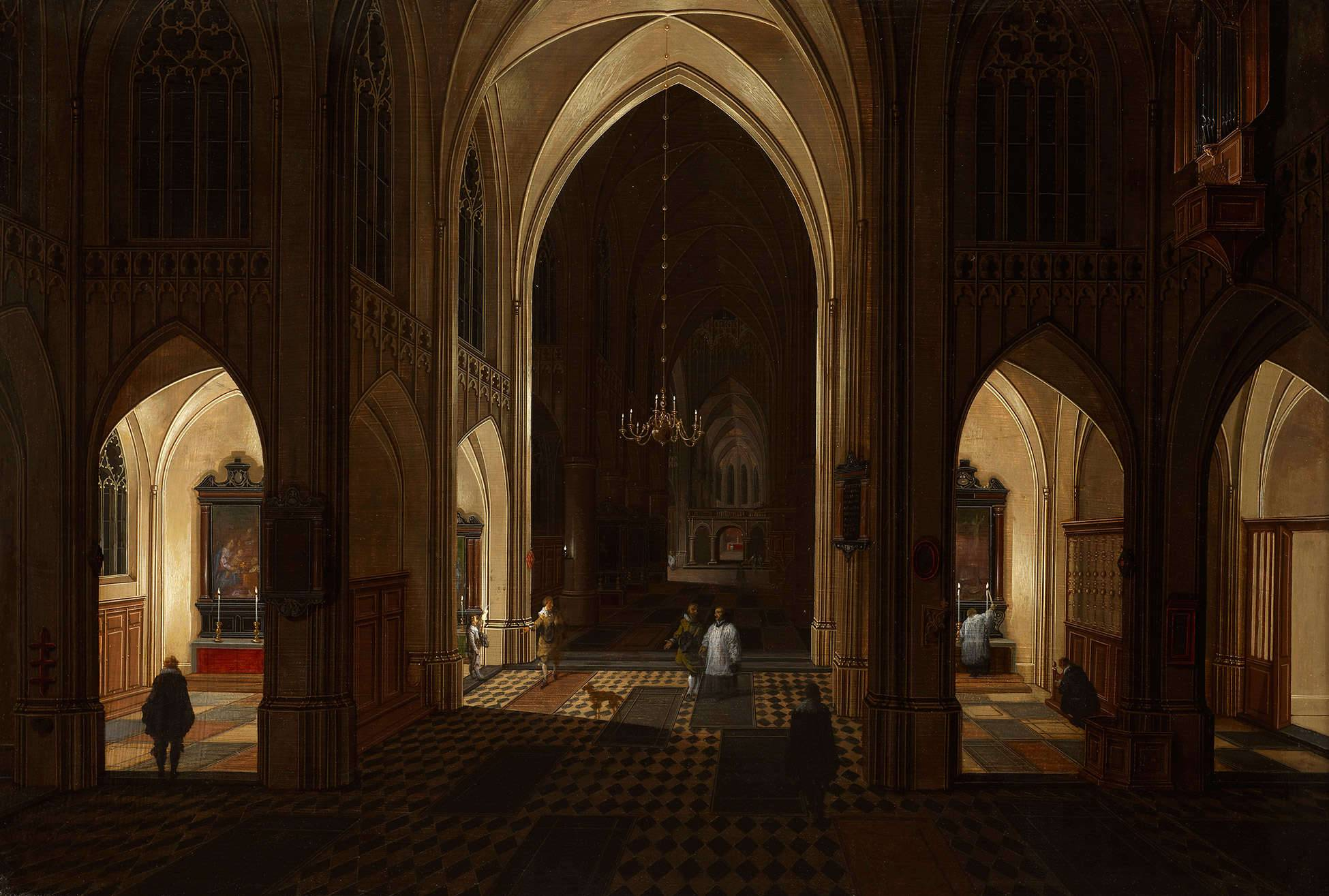
The Interior of a Gothic Church by Night

The figures in the architectural views by the various Neefs were painted by such artists as Frans Francken the Younger and Frans Francken III, Jan Brueghel the Younger, Sebastiaen Vrancx, Adriaan van Stalbemt, David Teniers the Younger, Gonzales Coques and Bonaventura Peeters the Elder.

The works of Pieter Neefs the Elder and Younger have been called propaganda for the Catholic Counter Reformation. They typically show the interior of churches loosely based on Antwerp Cathedral in which the whole panoply of Catholic ecclesiastical activity is going on, in particular the Catholic sacraments such as baptism, communion, marriage, Mass, confession, the giving of alms, etc. All of these activities were often included in a single composition in a church swarming with priests and bristling with statues and paintings.
