= Christ after the Flagellation (Murillo, Champaign) =

Painting by Bartolomé Esteban Murillo

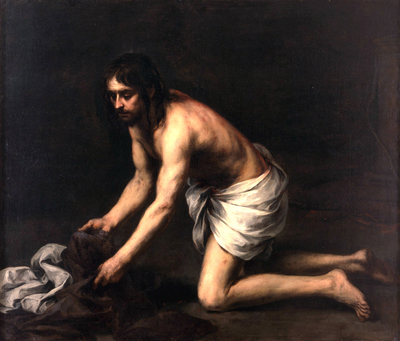
Christ after the Flagellation (c. 1670) by Bartolomé Esteban Murillo

Christ after the Flagellation is an oil on canvas painting by the Spanish artist Murillo, created c. 1670, now in the Krannert Art Museum in Champaign, Illinois, US, to which it was given by Herman C. Krannert and Ellnora Decker Krannert in 1960. The artist also produced an earlier version of the scene, now in Boston.

It first appears in the written record in 1840, when it was bequeathed by Frank Hall Standish to Louis-Philippe I of France. Three years later it was acquired by William Francis Connolly-Carew, 6th Baron Carew, remaining with his family until its purchase by the Krannerts in 1960.
