= Gerard Houckgeest =

Dutch Golden Age painter

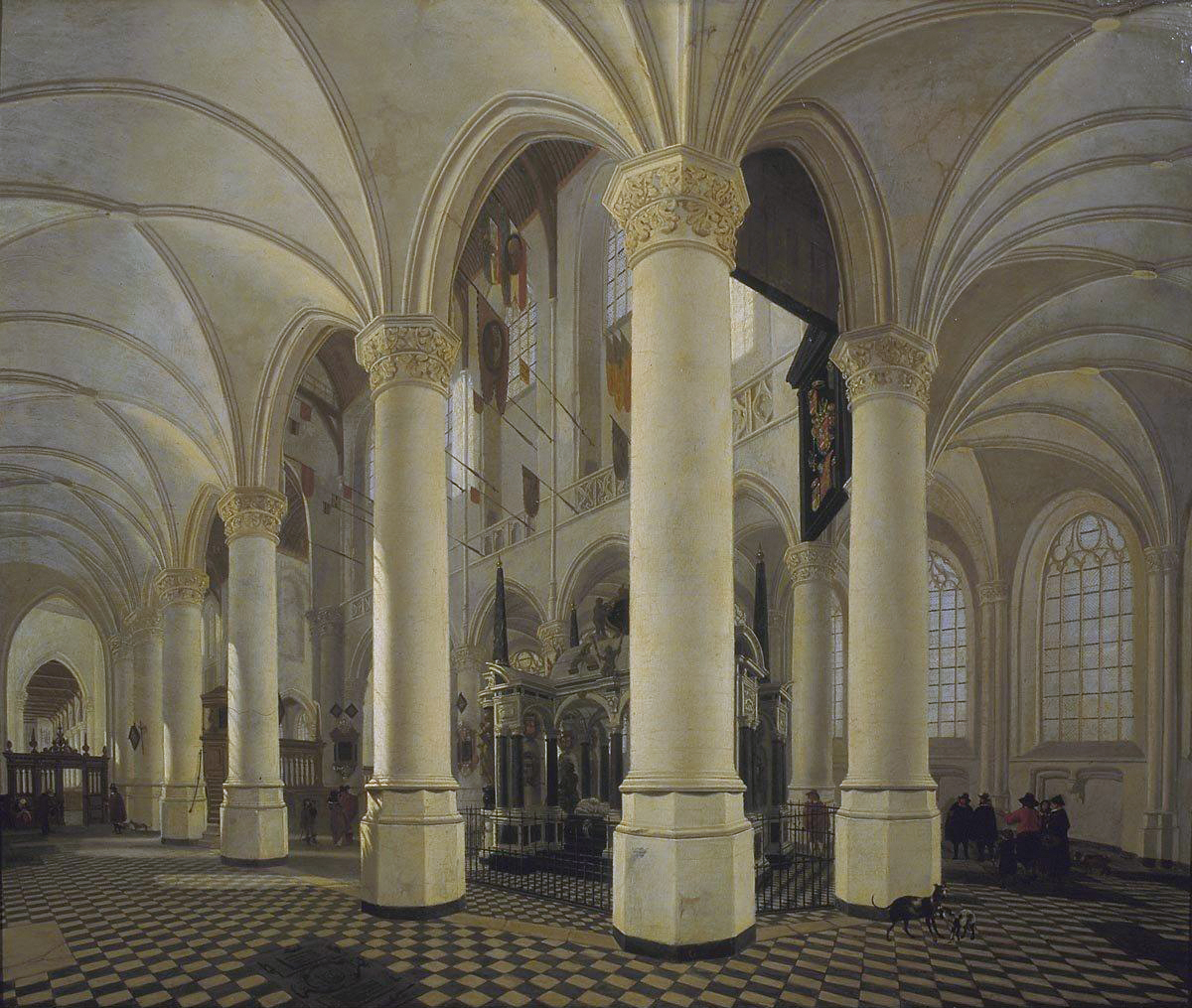
Gerard Houckgeest, Ambulatory of the New Church in Delft, with the tomb of William the Silent, 1651

Gerard Houckgeest (c. 1600–August 1661) was a Dutch Golden Age painter of architectural scenes and church interiors.

== Biography ==
Houckgeest is thought to have been born in The Hague, where, according to the RKD, he learned to paint from Bartholomeus van Bassen and worked in The Hague (1625–1635), Delft (1635–1649), Steenbergen (1651–52) and Bergen op Zoom (1652–1669). Some believe he spent some time in England as well. He specialized in painting imaginary church interiors and renaissance buildings, and died in Bergen op Zoom. Some of his works now reside at the Mauritshuis.
