= Hendrik van Steenwijk I =

Dutch painter

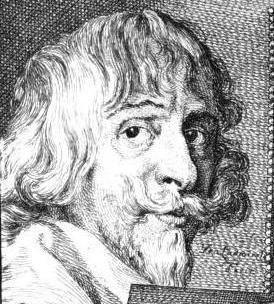
Detail of portrait from his biography by Karel van Mander

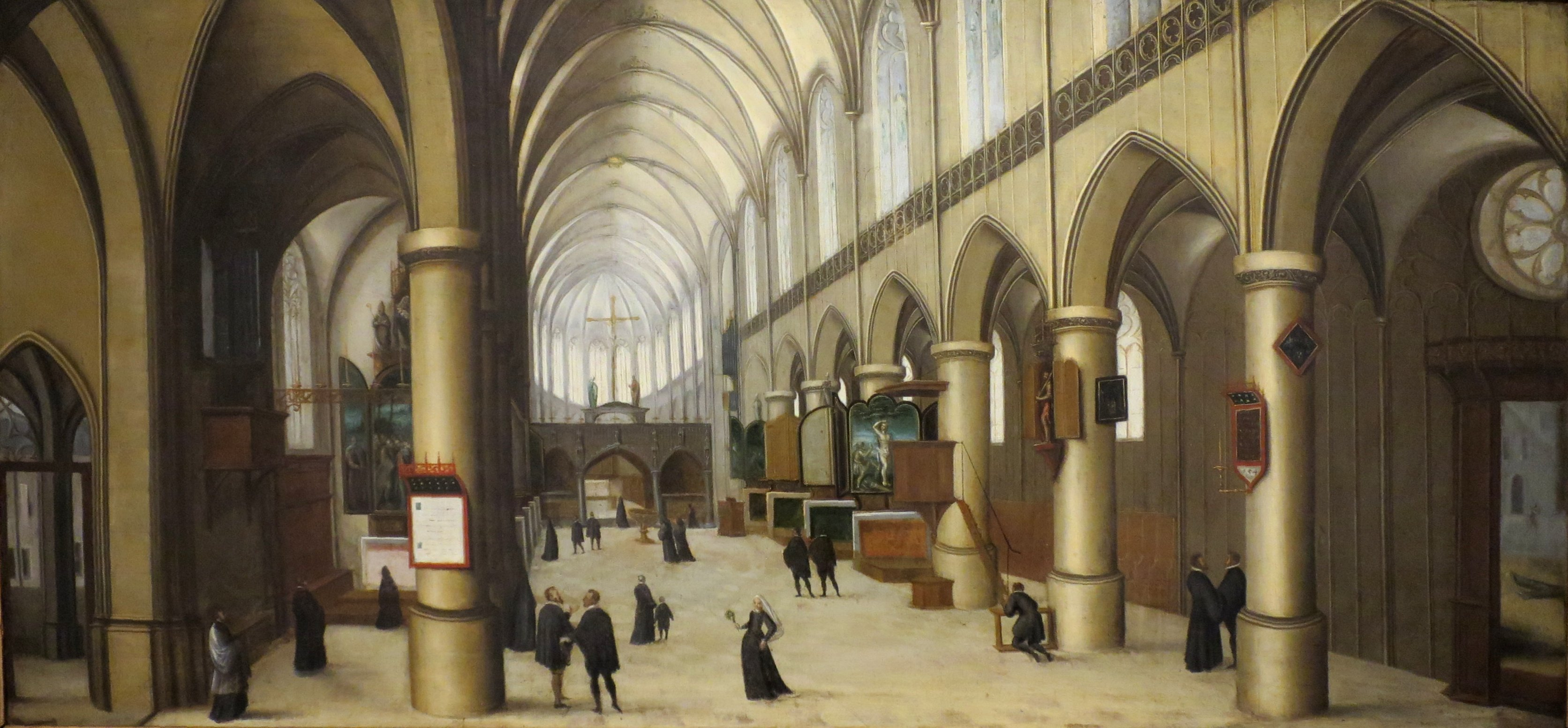
Church Interior, after 1580

Hendrik van Steenwijck I (also Steenwyck, Steenwijk) (c. 1550 – buried 1 September 1603) was a Dutch Golden Age painter, from early in the period, known mainly for his church interiors.

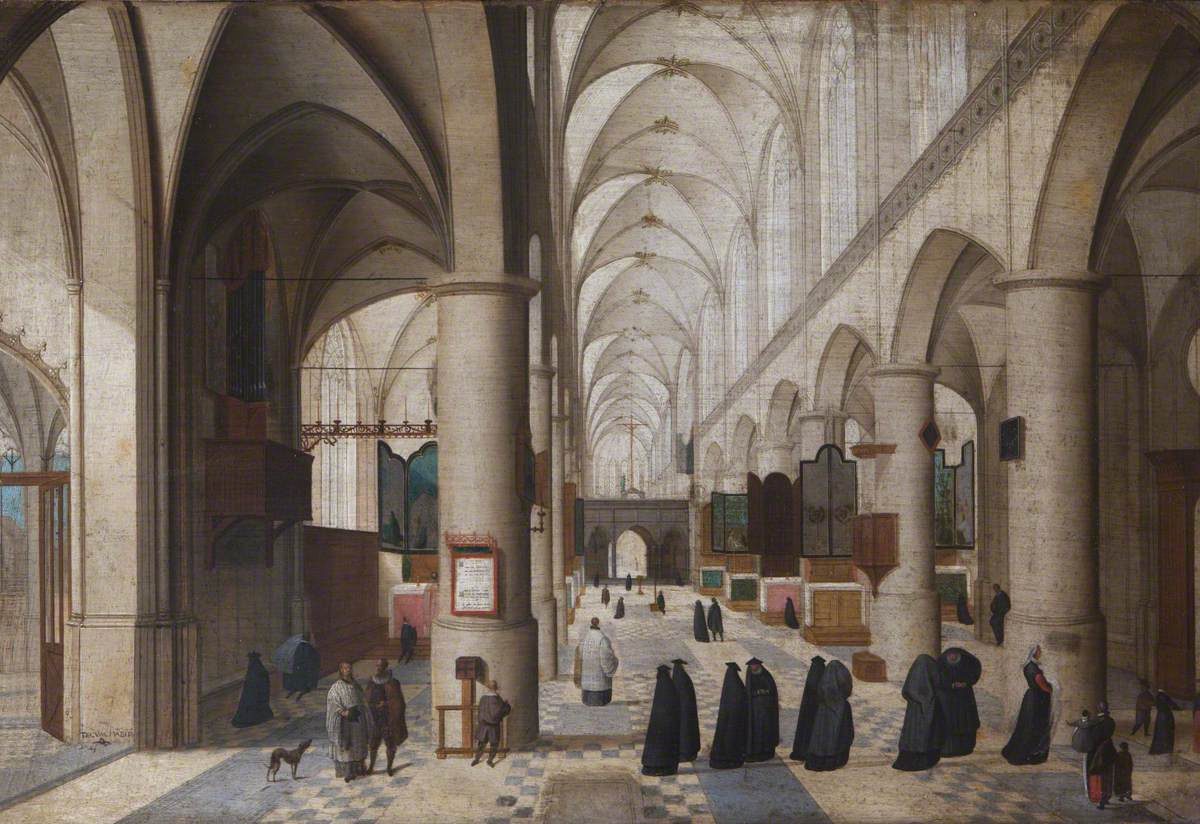
Imaginary View of Antwerp Cathedral, after 1570

Van Steenwijck was born in Kampen, and was a student of the architectural painter Hans Vredeman de Vries, and the father of Hendrik van Steenwijk II He is known to have worked in Aachen (1573–76), Antwerp (1577–85) and Frankfurt (from 1586 on), where he died.

Van Steenwijck is the earliest-known painter of architectural interiors, a genre that was popular in Dutch Golden Age and Flemish Baroque painting. In addition to introducing the new genre, he also worked with more natural lighting and perspectival space than found in the works of his teacher Vredeman de Vries.
