= Capriccio (art) =

Architectural fantasy in painting

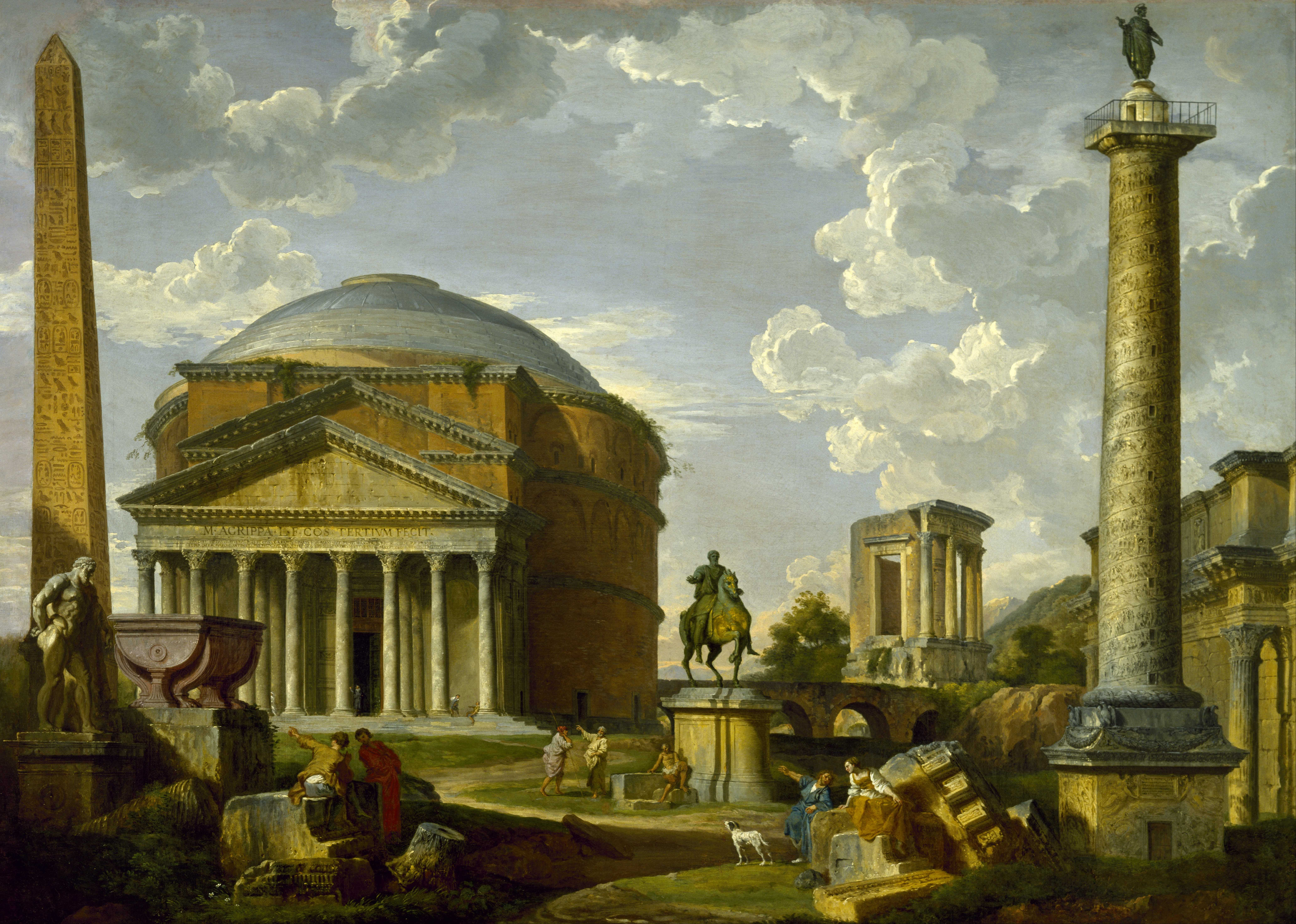
Fantasy view with the Pantheon and other monuments of Ancient Rome, 1737, by Giovanni Paolo Panini

In painting, a capriccio (Italian pronunciation: [kaˈprittʃo], plural: capricci [kaˈprittʃi]; in older English works often anglicized as "caprice") is an architectural fantasy, placing together buildings, archaeological ruins and other architectural elements in fictional and often fantastical combinations. These paintings may also include staffage (figures). Capriccio falls under the more general term of landscape painting. This style of painting was introduced in the Renaissance and continued into the Baroque.

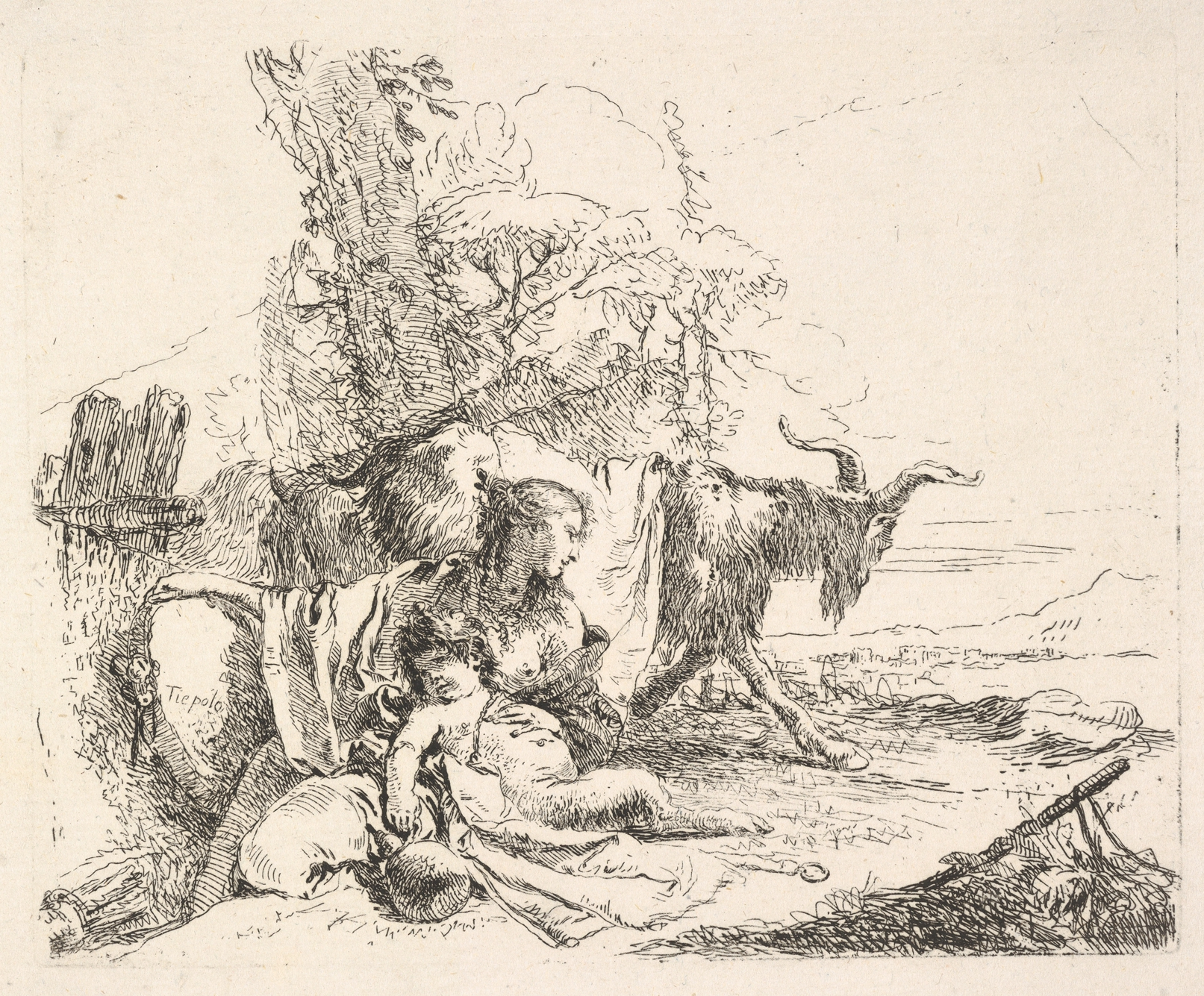
Woman and infant satyr in a landscape, from the etching series 'Capricci' by GB Tiepolo

By the late 18th century the term had expanded to mean any image with an equivalent degree of fantasy, for example as used in the titles of print series by Giovanni Battista Tiepolo and Goya, both of whom focus on figures rather than architecture.

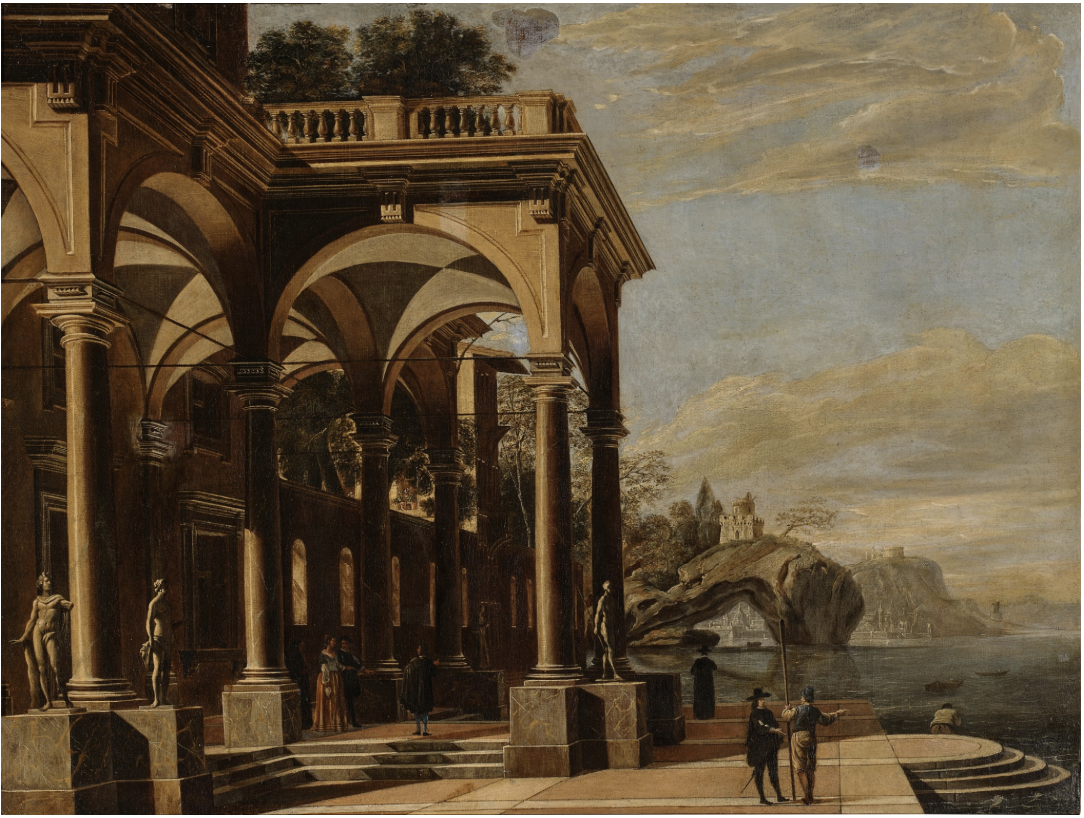
An architectural capriccio with figures by a colonnaded portico, a castle on a sea arch and coastal village beyond by Viviano Codazzi

The term is also used for other types of art with an element of fantasy (as capriccio in music).

== Capriccio style ==
There are several etymologies that have been put forward for capriccio, one of which is derived from the Italian word capretto, which roughly translates to the unpredictable movement and behavior from a young goat. This etymology suggests that the art style is unpredictable and as open as the imagination can make it.

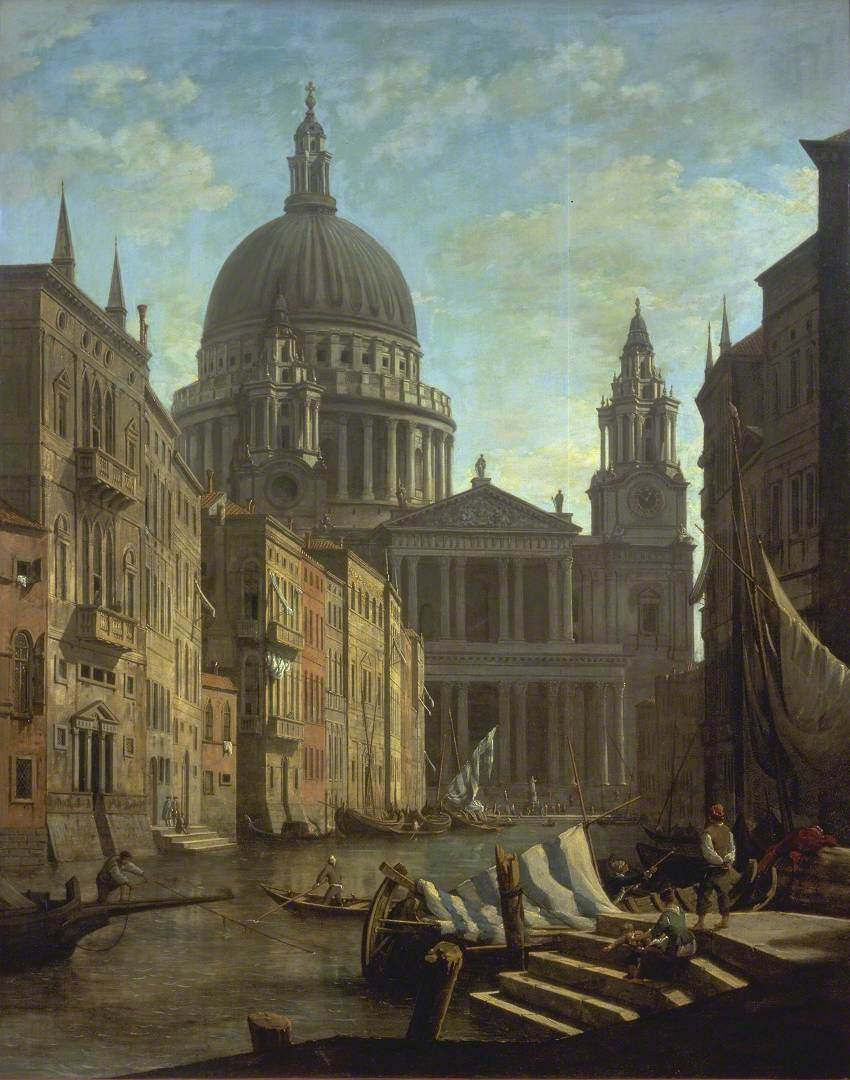
Capriccio: St Paul's and a Venetian Canal by William Marlow, 1795

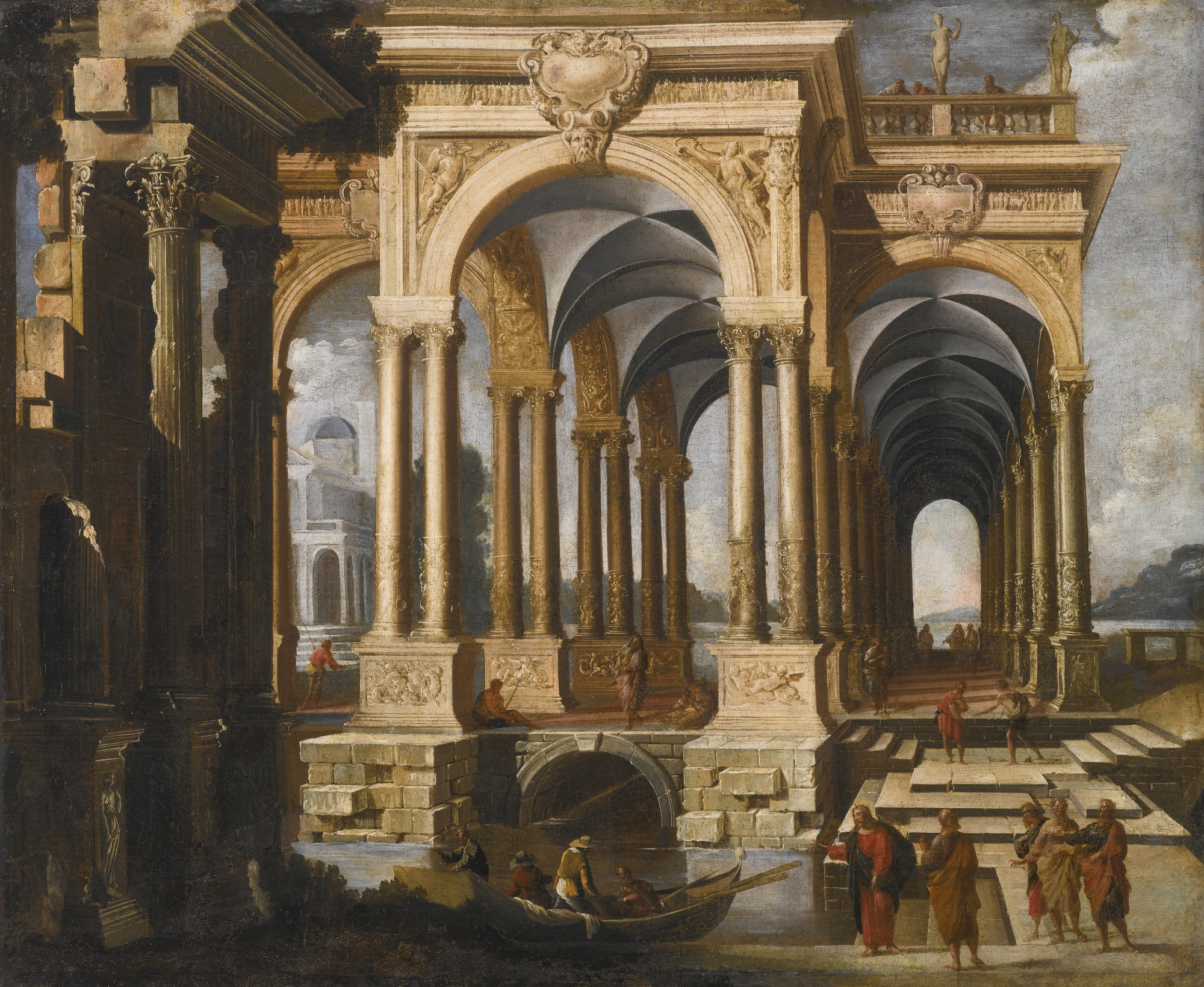
Architectural Capriccio with Christ and Disciples attributed to François de Nomé, 17th century

In the 17th century, Filippo Baldinucci defined the capriccio as a dreamlike interpretation of the subject of a work that comes from a free imagination. Capriccio works often surround architecture that has been changed with pieces of a view that has taken artistic liberty into account. Capriccio often takes existing structures and places them into re-imagined settings and characteristics. The paintings can be anything from re-imagining a building in the future as ruins, to placing a structure in a completely different setting than that in which it exists in reality. The subjects of capriccio paintings cannot be taken as an accurate depiction due to the fantastical nature of the genre.

The architect David Mayernik cites four themes that are found in capricci:

1. Juxtaposing the subject in unfamiliar ways
2. Imagining different states of the subject, such as a building in the future that has been ruined or worn with time
3. Changing the size and scale of the subject
4. Taking liberties with grand features, such as cities, fountains, etc.

When artists were commissioned to create a painting of an architectural piece, they were not necessarily concerned with accurate representation of a building. Rather, they could be freer in terms of interpretation and artistic license. This allowed the artists to add decorations or other architectural features at their own discretion. This artistic freedom in capriccio allows continual transformation of a building. This was aided by the fact that architecture commonly is composed of strong lines, both horizontal and vertical that can be analogous to other architectural works, making it possible to take parts of other architectural works and fit them into the new artistic view of a particular building that was being recreated in the form of capriccio. Some artists took elements that didn't belong in the original inspiration such as people, animals, or plants and incorporated them into the work. In the realm of capriccio, a painting of a building is not a record or history, but is a piece of artwork before anything.

As capriccio paintings were recreated by different artists, the original form of the subject was able to move farther from reality. This further allowed artists to take liberty with architectural renditions. Capriccio is thought to be a form of art that appeals to the aesthetics of the viewer by taking liberty with extravagance that eventually turned into art that was intentionally fantastical in regards to the original architectural piece.

== History ==
The predecessor of this type of decorative architectural painting can be found in 16th-century Italian painting, and in particular in the architectural settings that were painted as the framework of large-scale frescoes and ceiling decorations known as 'quadratture'. These architectural elements gained prominence in 17th-century painting to become stand-alone subjects of easel paintings.

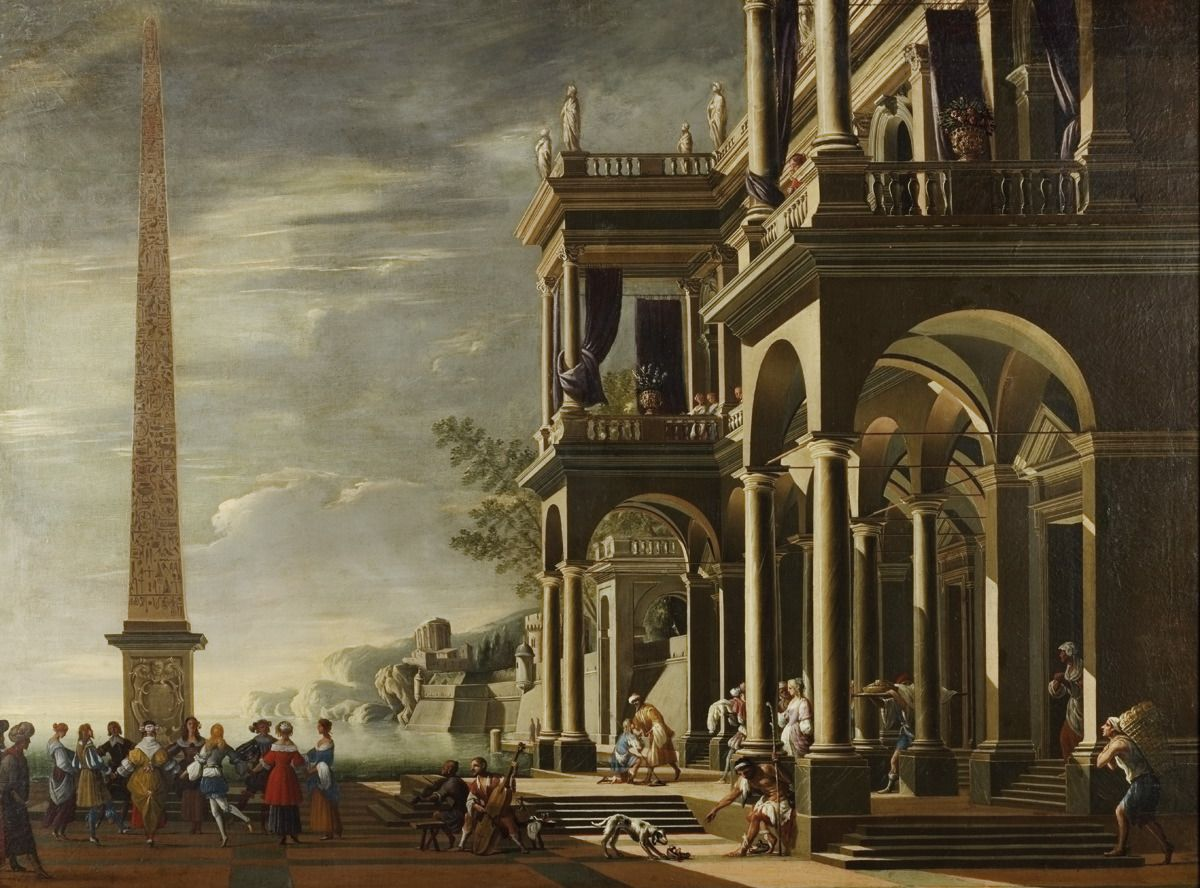
Capriccio, by Alessandro Salucci

Early practitioners of the genre who made the genre popular in mid-17th-century Rome included Alessandro Salucci and Viviano Codazzi. These artists represent two different approaches to the genre: Codazzi's capricci were more realistic than those of Salucci, who showed more creativity and liberty in his approach by rearranging Roman monuments to fit his compositional objectives. The 'quadratture' frescoes of Agostino Tassi and the urban views of Claude Lorrain and Herman van Swanevelt, which he saw in Rome, may have stimulated Viviano Codazzi to start painting capricci.

A well known proponent of capriccio was the artist Giovanni Paolo Pannini (1691–1765). This style was extended in the 1740s by Canaletto in his etched vedute ideali, and works by Piranesi and his imitators.

Later examples include Charles Robert Cockerell's A Tribute to Sir Christopher Wren and A Professor's Dream, and Joseph Gandy's 1818 Public and Private Buildings Executed by Sir John Soane. The artist Carl Laubin has painted a number of modern capriccios in homage to these works.

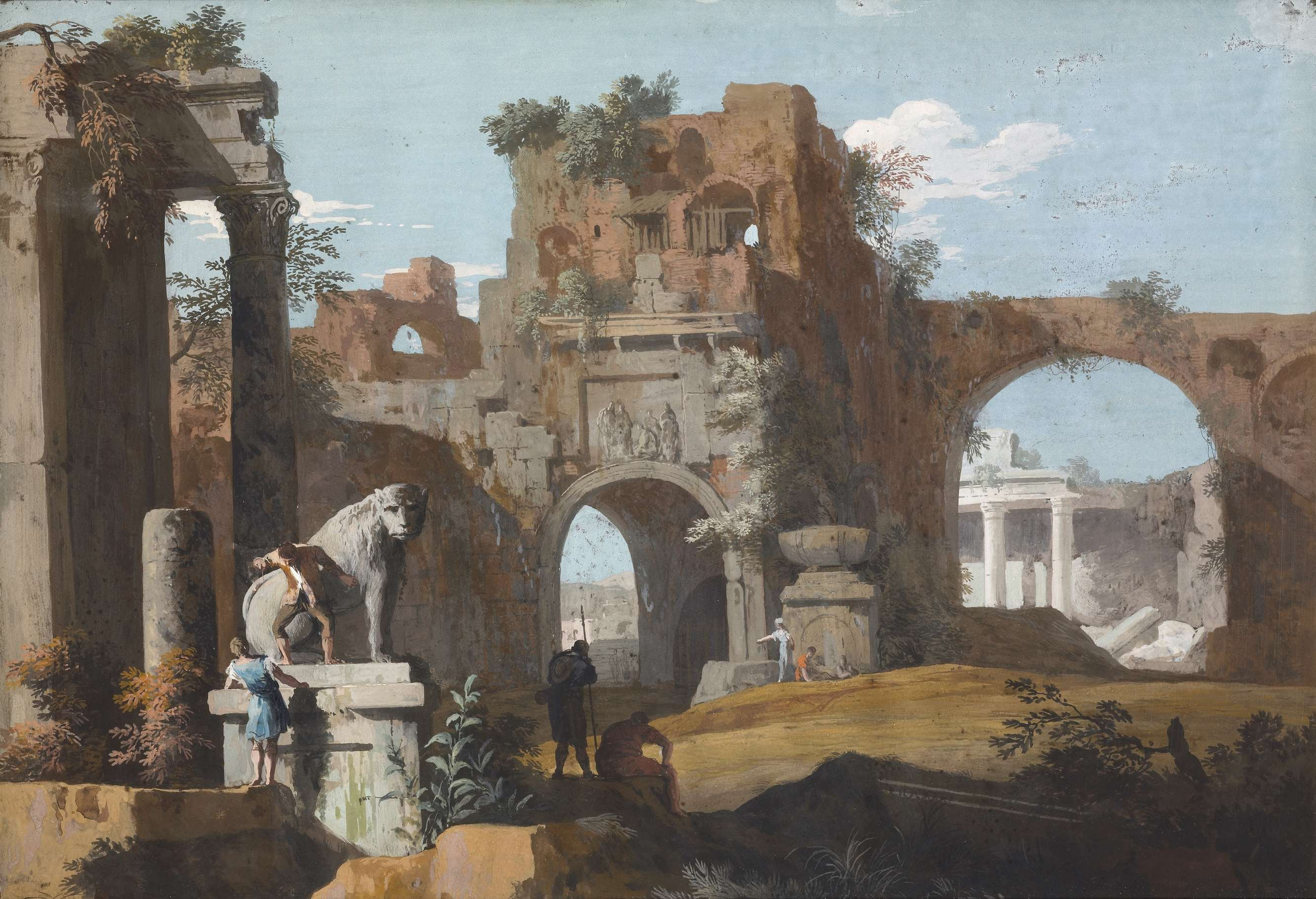
Classical landscape with ruins, c. 1725, by Marco Ricci

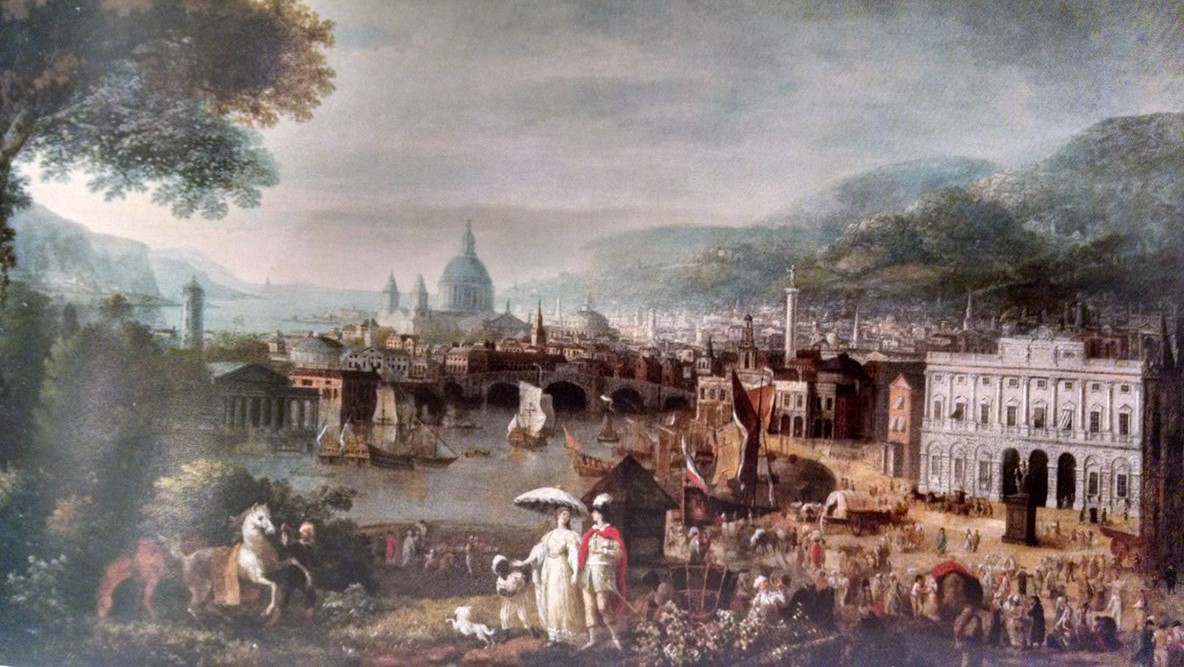
Capriccio of the City of London, circle of Robert Griffier

Further fantastical expansions can be seen in the Capricci, an influential series of etchings by Gianbattista Tiepolo, who reduced the architectural elements to chunks of classical statuary and ruins, among which small groups made up of a cast of exotic and elegant figures of soldiers, philosophers and beautiful young people go about their enigmatic business. No individual titles help to explain these works; mood and style are everything. A later series was called Scherzi di fantasia – "Fantastic Sketches". His son Domenico Tiepolo was among those who imitated these prints, often using the term in titles.

Goya's series of eighty prints Los Caprichos, and the last group of prints in his series The Disasters of War, which he called "caprichos enfáticos" ("emphatic caprices"), are far from the spirit of light-hearted fantasy the term usually suggests. They take Tiepolo's format of a group of figures, now drawn from contemporary Spanish life, and are a series of savage satires and comments on its absurdity, many only partly explicated by short titles. The Sleep of Reason Produces Monsters is the best known.

== Notable capriccio artists ==
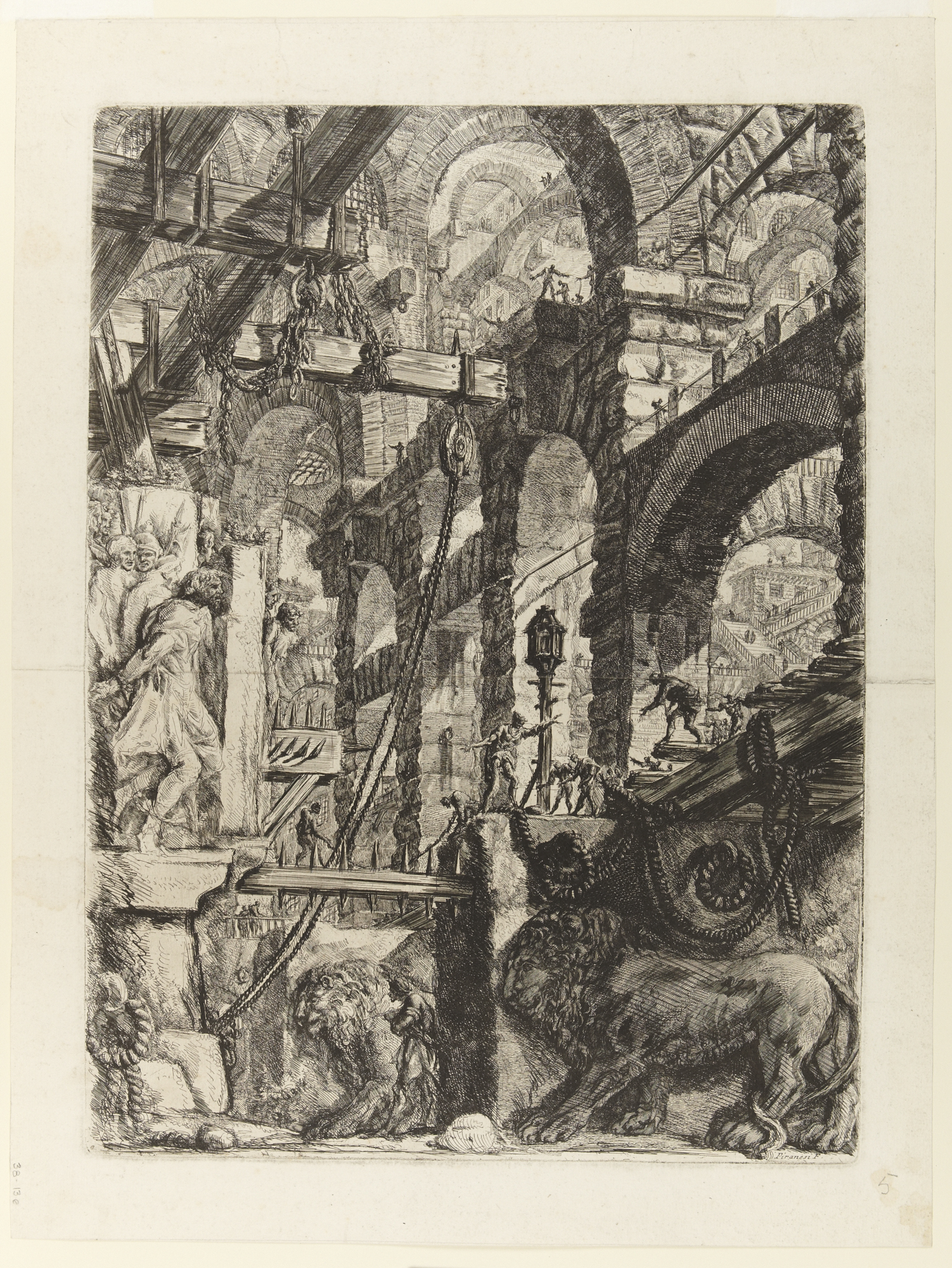
Giovanni Battista Piranesi, Le Carceri d'Invenzione, 2nd edition, 1761, #5 The Lion Bas-Reliefs

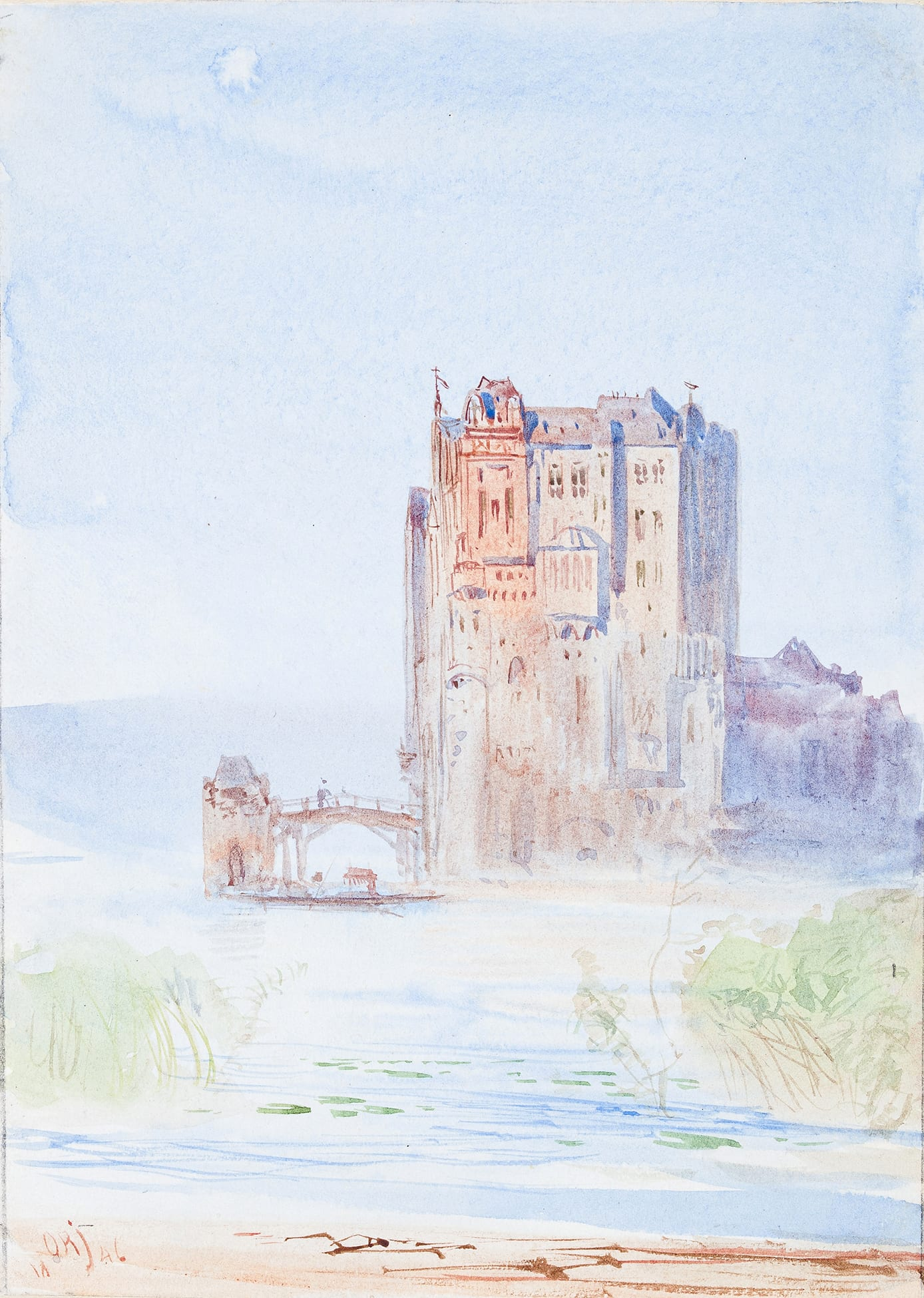
Castle by a lake (1846), an ink and watercolour capriccio by Otto Reinhold Jacobi

- Pietro Capelli
- Charles-Louis Clérisseau
- Leonardo Coccorante
- Viviano Codazzi
- Domenico Gargiulo
- Giovanni Ghisolfi
- Gennaro Greco
- Francesco Guardi
- Ascanio Luciano
- Pietro Paltronieri
- Giovanni Paolo Panini
- Giovanni Battista Piranesi
- Hubert Robert
- Marco Ricci
- Sebastian Pether
- Alessandro Salucci
