= Museo Paparella Treccia Devlet =

Coordinates: 42.4725°N 14.2083°E

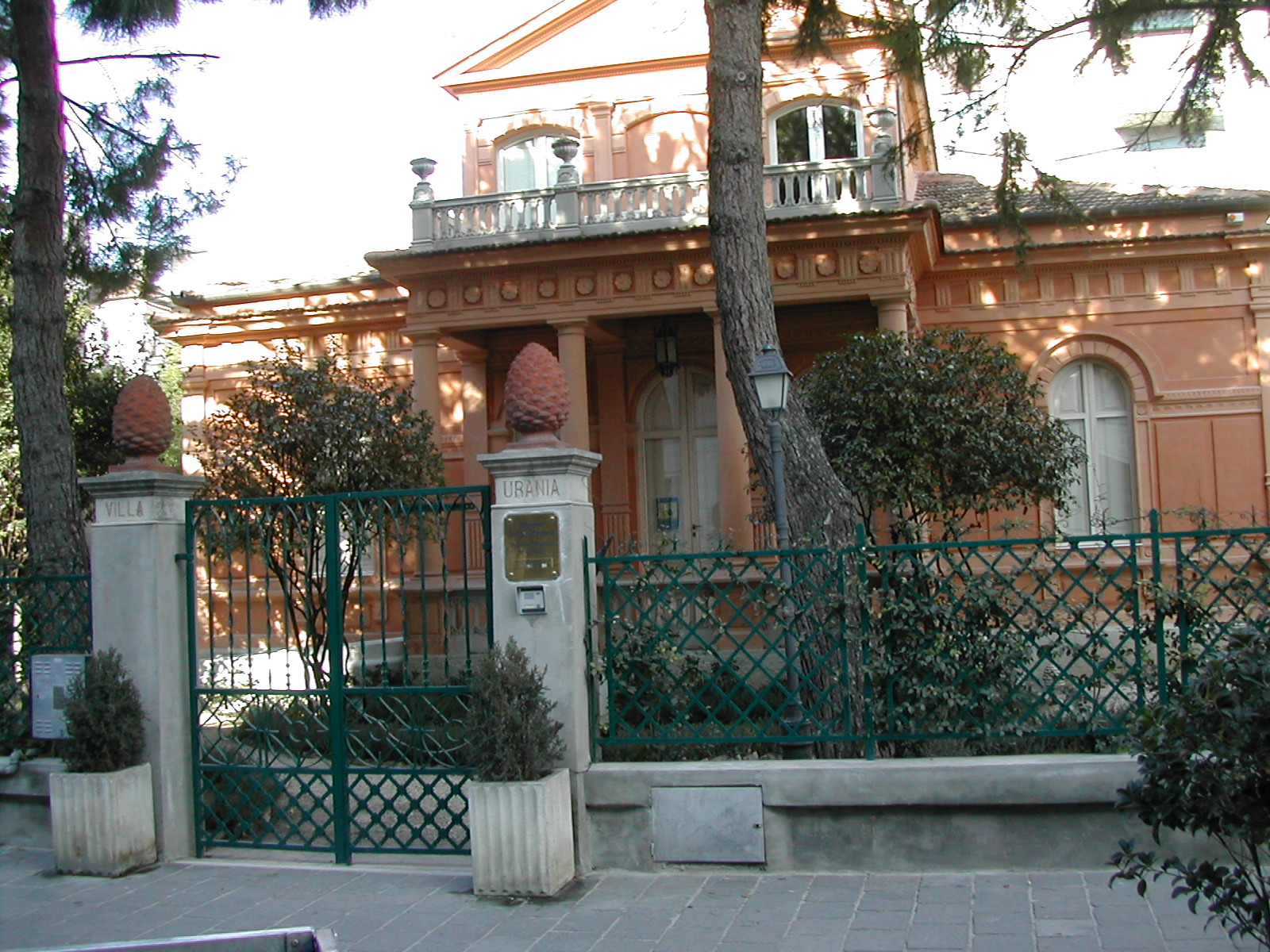
- Museo Paparella Treccia Devlet
- Location: Pescara
- Type: Art museum
- Website: http://www.museopaparelladevlet.com/

Museo Paparella Treccia Devlet (Italian for Paparella Treccia Devlet Museum) is an art museum in Pescara, Abruzzo.

== History ==
Villa Urania, home to the Raffaele Paparella Treccia and Margherita Devlet Foundation, is a small eclectic-style building dating back to the late 19th century. The quadrangular villa has a single level, but at its center, an attic topped with a pediment emerges. The attic opens onto a terrace supported by four Doric columns that form three full-arched openings. The villa was erected by Baron Giandomenico Treccia, who dedicated this aristocratic summer residence to his beloved wife, Urania Valentini. Built according to the taste of the time, it is located in the heart of Pescara (then known as Castellammare Adriatico), just a few steps from the sea.

== Collection ==
The permanent collection consists of 151 antique majolica pieces from Castelli, created between the 16th and 19th centuries. The collection includes works by the masters active in the area: Francesco Grue, Carlo Antonio Grue, Francesco Antonio Grue, Gesualdo Fuina, Carmine Gentili, Candeloro Cappelletti, and Silvio De Martinis. The works document the evolution of the Castelli majolica style, from the compendiary style, characterized by extreme simplicity of elements (16th and 17th centuries), to the istoriato and Baroque, featuring historical, religious, and mythological scenes (17th and 18th centuries), up to the Rococo and Neoclassical styles (18th and 19th centuries).

The museum also houses paintings, including a 15th-century Nativity, an 18th-century self-portrait by the Tuscan Pietro Santi Bambocci, and 17th-century cathedral interiors attributed to Monsù Desiderio, a name referring to a trio of artists of French origin active in Naples, the most notable of whom was François Didier Nomé. The collection was started in 1950 by Raffaele Paparella Treccia, an orthopedic surgeon, who in 1997 donated the collection and the villa to the Foundation named after him and his wife Margherita Devlet, co-managed with the Municipality of Pescara.
