= Ascanio Luciano =

Italian painter

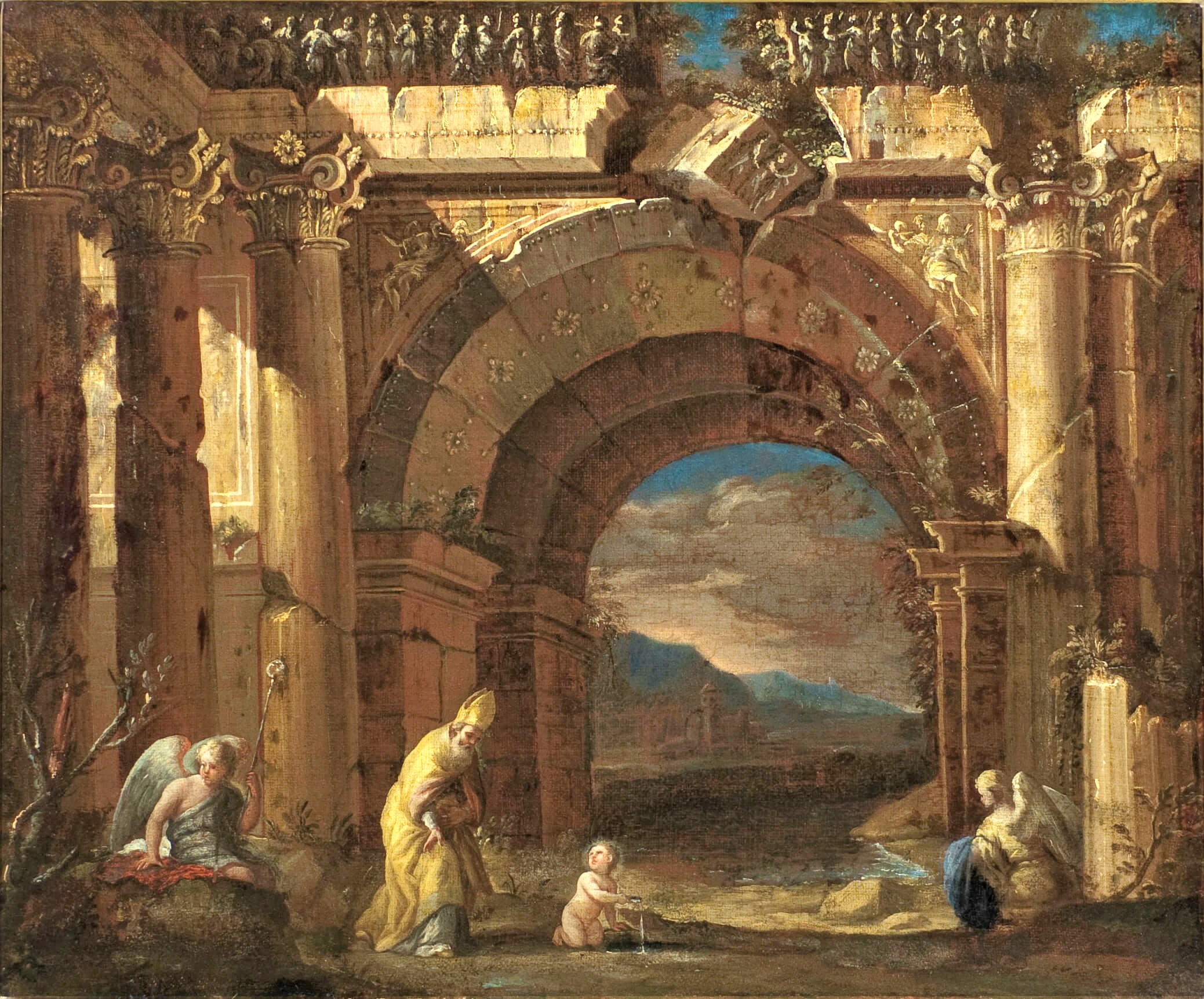
Capriccio with the vision of St. Augustine in a ruined arcade

Ascanio Luciano or Ascanio Luciani (1621 – 18 August 1706) was an Italian architectural painter who was active during the Baroque period. He is known for his architectural paintings, capricci, compositions with figures among ruins, and some vedute. He worked in Naples throughout his career. He is regarded as playing an important hinge role in the genre of architectural capricci between leading founders of the genre such as Viviano Codazzi and François de Nomé and the 18th-century specialists of the genre.

== Life ==
Details about his life are scarce. He is believed to have been born in Naples in 1621. When the architectural painter Viviano Codazzi took up residence in Naples in 1634, Luciano was just 13 years old. It is believed that Luciano trained with Codazzi before Codazzi left Naples around 1650. The basis for the assumption is that Luciano's early works are very close in style to those of Codazzi to the point of often being confused with the works of his presumed master. In 1665 Luciano became a member of the Congregation of painters of Ss. Anna and Luca.

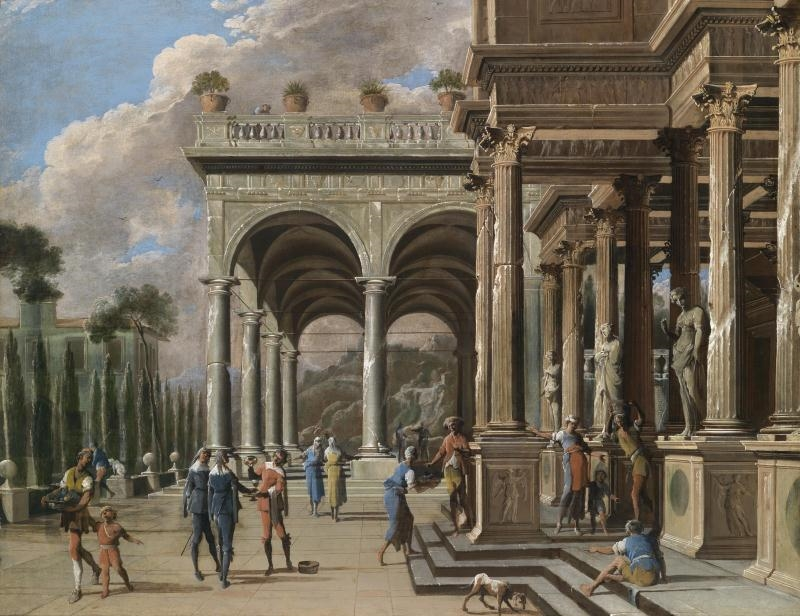
Palatial architecture with figures

Luciano lived until a very old age and died in Naples on 18 August 1706.

== Work ==
Luciano was a specialist of architectural paintings, capricci, compositions with figures among ruins, and some vedute. In these works, he displayed his thorough knowledge of perspective. His late works are often signed. There remain problems and controversies regarding attributions of certain works to Luciano as well as to whether he executed certain works entirely by himself or collaborated with specialised staffage painters for the figures in his architectural scenes. For instance, in the Christ and the adultress (private collection) some art historians see the hand of Luca Giordano or Giuseppe Simonelli while others ascribe the work entirely to Luciano.

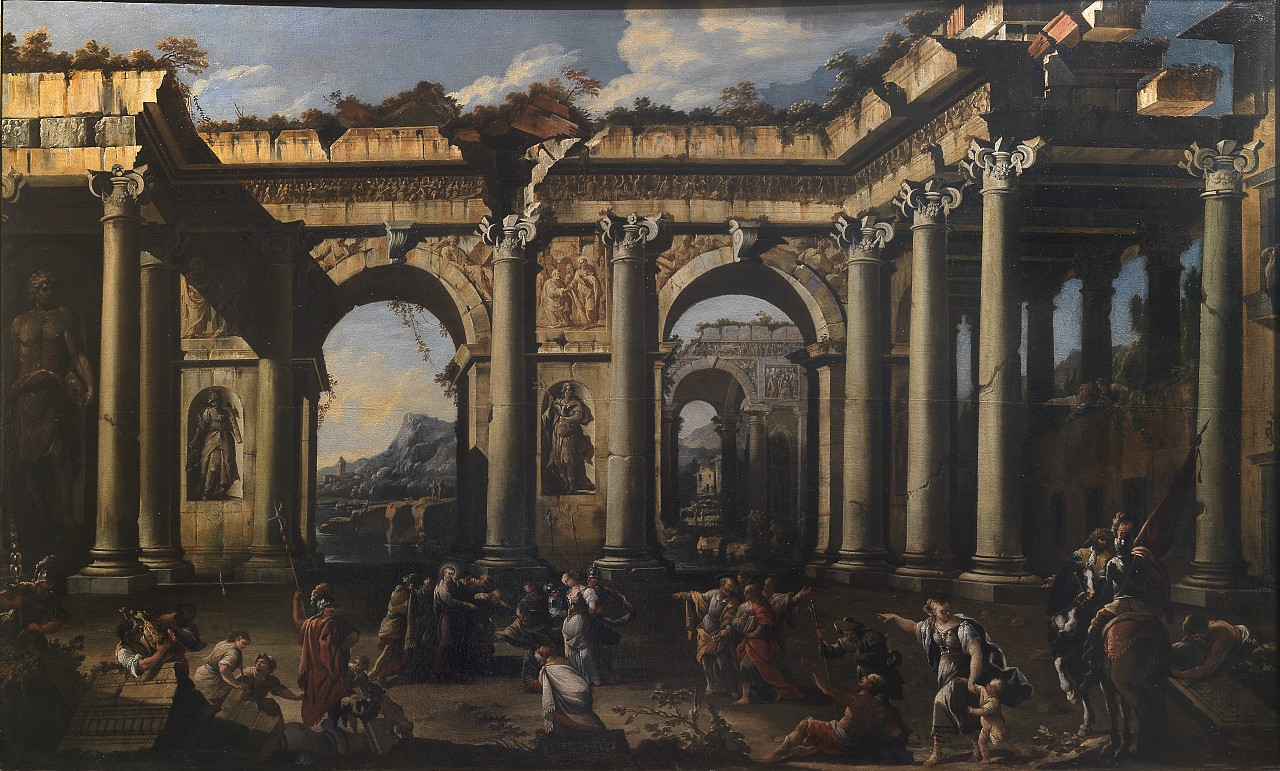
Christ and the adultress

The type of decorative architectural paintings that Luciano created represents a genre that became popular in mid-17th century Rome. Art historians interpret the growing popularity of the architectural piece in 17th-century Italy as the result of a shift of patronage from 'committente' to 'acquirente', that is, from painting on commission to painting on the open market. Architectural canvases were particularly welcome within the typical 17th-century decorative ensemble, where walls were completely covered with paintings of various types and sizes. The architectural piece lent variety to such ensembles by introducing the strong verticals and horizontals of its subject matter. The roots of this type of veduta can be found in 16th-century painting, and in particular in the architectural settings that were painted as the framework of large-scale frescoes and ceiling decorations known as quadratura. These architectural elements gained prominence in 17th-century painting to become stand-alone subjects of easel paintings.

A number of artists practised this genre. Codazzi was an important inventor of the genre. Alessandro Salucci was a prominent contemporary practitioner of the genre whose work was influenced by Codazzi. A contemporary practitioner in Naples was Gennaro Greco.

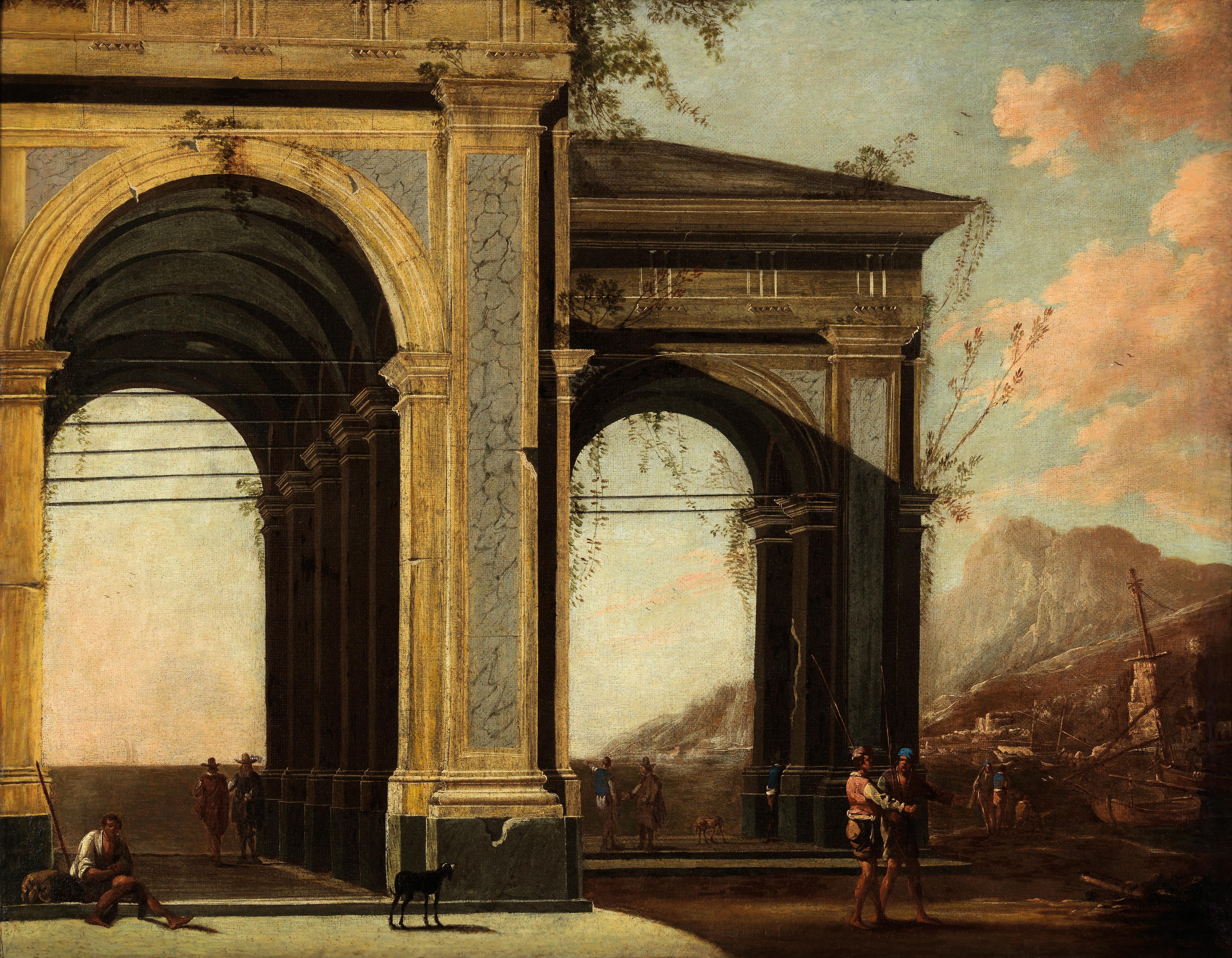
Portico with loggia by the sea, with boats and figures

Luciano's work was originally very close to that of his presumed master Codazzi. This earned him the nickname 'Pseudo-Codazzi'. There was a difference with Codazzi in that Luciano's works were more narrative and less dramatic. Luciano was less concerned with accurate architectural rendering, in the tradition of quadratura. His interest lay in creating colourful effects. While Luciano incorporated, like Codazzi, Bamboccianti genre elements of daily life, he softened the more realistic approach of the Bamboccianti and their indecorous aspects. Luciano's style combined genre aspects with the elegance of Classicism, ennobled by sumptuous fancy architectures. His mature works anticipate 18th-century developments. It is these characteristics which attracted the attention of travellers on their Grand Tour, as it offered a mirror of the daily life in Rome while also expressing the monumentality of historic Rome. Luciano also occasionally depicted in his architectural settings scenes from the Bible including The Massacre of the Innocents and Christ Expelling the Money-changers from the Temple.

Ascanio Luciano often used the motif of arcades, which are developed in both directions into a forest of columns. This motif has been called the hypostyle hall motif.

The reception of Luciano's work by art critics has been mixed. In the early 18th century Bernardo de' Dominici considered Luciano a "mediocre perspective painter but fortunate in his time who could demand a high price for touching up paintings". Aldo De Rinaldis, writing in the early 20th century, on the other hand, was very enthusiastic about Luciano's work and included an article full of praise on Luciano in the journal "Napoli Nobilissima". Modern criticism regards Luciano as an important transitory figure in the genre of architectural capricci between the leading founders of the genre such as Viviano Codazzi and François de Nomé and the 18th-century specialists of the genre.

== Other projects ==
- Media related to Ascanio Luciano at Wikimedia Commons
