= Lootens =

Lootens or Looten is a surname of Flemish and Dutch origin. Notable people with the surname include:

- Charles L. Lootens (1900–1994), American sound engineer
- Christophe Looten (born 1958), French composer
- Jan Looten (1617/1618–c.1681), Dutch landscape painter
- Julien Lootens (1876–1942), Belgian cyclist
- Lena Lootens (born 1959), Dutch soprano
- Louis Aloysius Lootens (1827–1898), Belgian-born Canadian Catholic prelate
