= Capriccio of the City of London =

18th-century painting

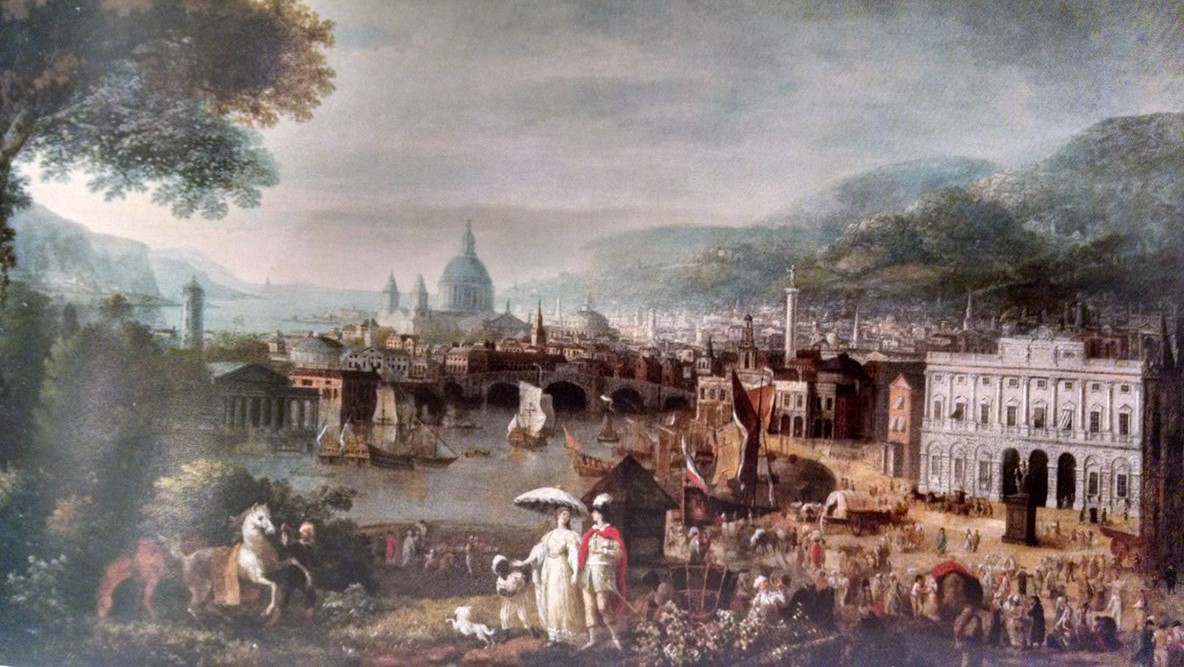
Capriccio of London with the Port, the Bank of England, the Monument and Saint Paul's Cathedral

Capriccio of the City of London is an early 18th century oil painting adscribed to the circle of Robert Griffier, including his father Jan Griffier and his brother Jan Griffier II.

== Description ==
This canvas shows London almost a century after the devastating Great Fire of London of September 1666. A courtly couple costumed in the period of George II promenades in the foreground. The commercial peak of the time is portrayed by the abundant merchant ships on the River Thames. In the centre stands the famous Monument to the Great Fire of London column built in 1677 by architect Sir Christopher Wren who was commissioned to reconstruct much of the city after the fire.

In the foreground of the work parades a courtly couple dressed according to the time of George II, together with possibly their black servants, as well as a pair of horses with their rider. The artist portrayed the commercial boom of the 17th century, which can be seen by the abundant number of merchant ships on the Thames and by the mercantile activities that take place in the background of the painting.

In the center stands the Monument erected in 1677 by the architect Sir Christopher Wren, who was primarily responsible for the reconstruction of the city after the fire. Said 61-meter-high column that was built on the site where the fire began, whose project to finish off the Doric column, as reflected in the painting, was with a woman wielding a sword as an allegory of victory, although in the monument was decided to place a flaming bronze urn. The other point that remembers the fire is the Golden Child of Pye corner, the place where the fire ended.

Towards the back of the scene is Wren's St Paul's Cathedral which was built between 1676 and 1710.
