= Monsù Desiderio =

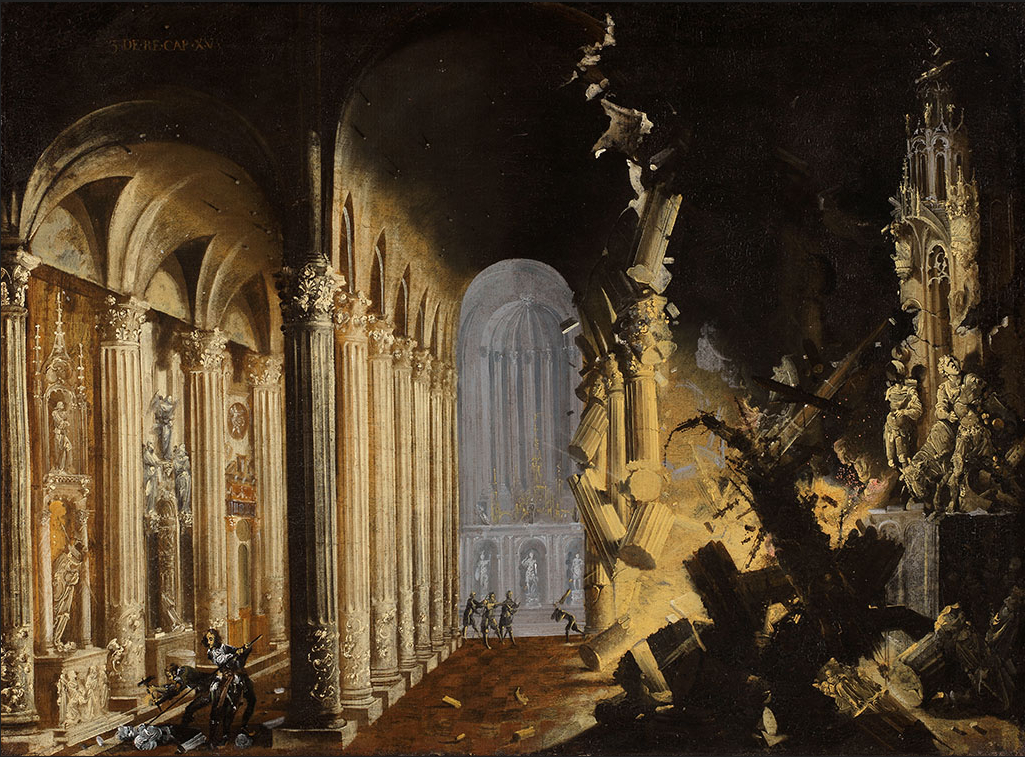
Explosion in a Cathedral by François de Nomé.

Monsù Desiderio is the name formerly given to an artist believed to have painted architectural scenes in a distinctive style in Naples in the early seventeenth century. The term monsù, a corruption of the French monsieur, was often used by Neapolitan historians to denote a painter of foreign origin.

In the mid-twentieth century, art historians identified the works previously attributed to "Desiderio" as being by at least three different painters: François de Nomé and Didier Barra, both originally from Metz, and a third artist, whose name is unknown. Nomé's works were described by Rudolf Wittkower as "bizarre and ghostlike paintings of architecture, often crumbling and fantastic".
