= Didier Barra =

French painter

- Born: 1590; Metz
- Died: 1656 (aged 65–66); Naples, Kingdom of Naples
- Other name: Part of the group known as "Monsù Desiderio"
- Known for: Painting; architectural fantasies and cityscapes
- Movement: Baroque

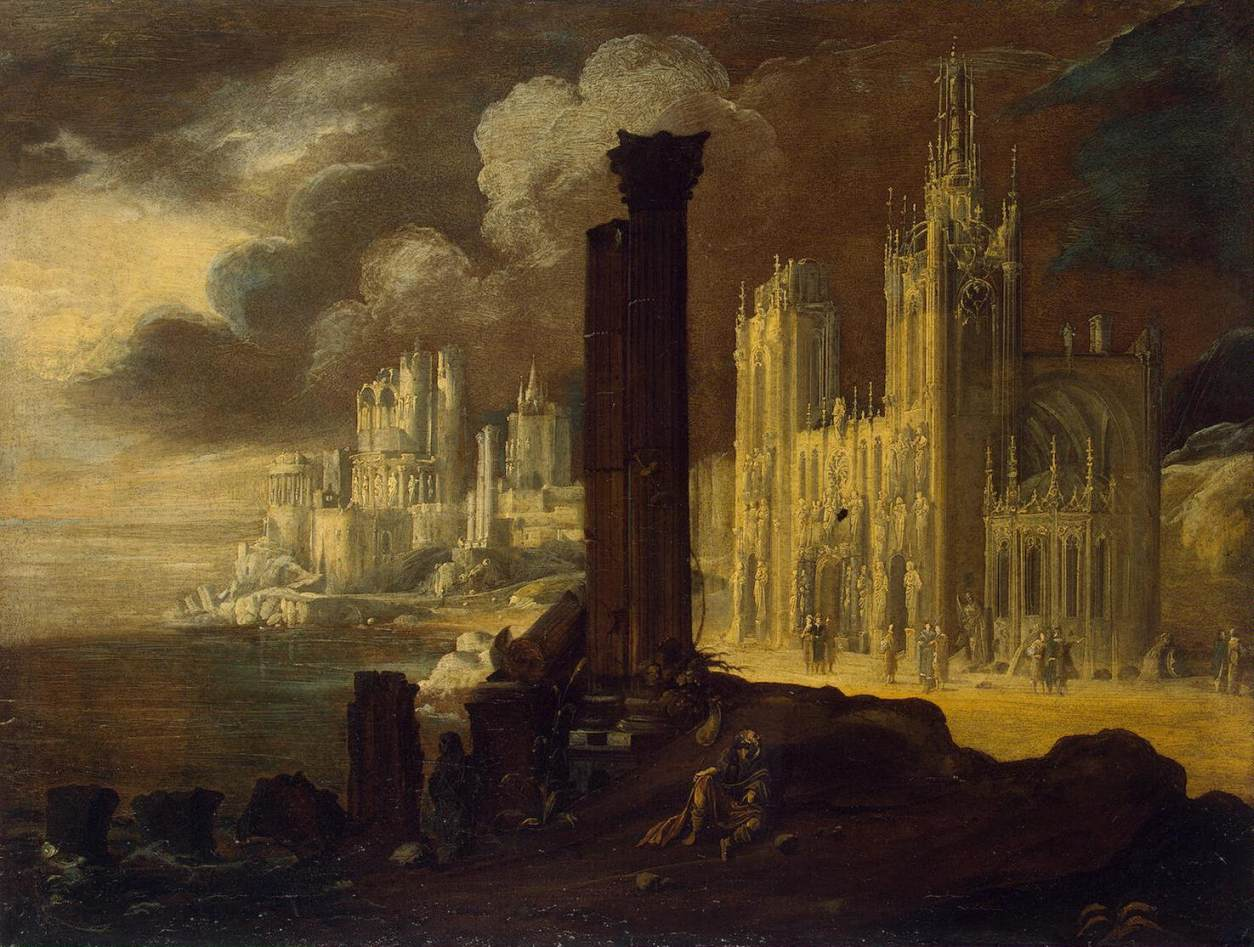
Landscape with Buildings by Didier Barra, Hermitage Museum

Didier Barra (1590 - 1656) was a French Renaissance painter.

Not much is known about Barra's life except through his works. He was born in Metz, but left for Italy in 1608. In Naples, he was very successful, especially for his cityscapes. He primarily painted scenes featuring decrepit ruins or near-barren buildings in a nearly-surrealist, apparently post-apocalyptic landscape. Until the mid-twentieth century, Barra's works were believed to be by one "Monsù Desiderio". However, the works formerly attributed to Desiderio have since been identified as the work of at least three artists: Barra, François de Nomé, who was also from Metz, and a third, as yet unnamed painter. The similarities in both themes and style, and the fact that there were occasions where Barra and de Nomé collaborated, have made attributions challenging. One work executed by Barra Saint Standing in a Niche is part of the Courtauld Gallery collection. He died in Naples in 1656.
