= Jan Griffier II =

English painter

Jan Griffier II (1688–c.1750]) was an 18th-century painter active in England.

== Biography ==
Griffier was born in England and died in London. According to Houbraken, Jan Griffier's son Robert was born on 7 October 1688, but he mixed up his information on the son Robert Griffier with Jan Jr, who he didn't mention by name at all.

According to the Netherlands Institute for Art History he was the son of Jan Griffier I and the younger brother of Robert. He lived on Pall Mall and influenced the painter Christian August Lorentzen.

== Gallery ==
Selected works by Jan Griffier II
The Thames during the Great Frost of 1739, Guildhall Art Gallery

Winchester from the South-West with an Encampment in the Foreground, Winchester City Council’s Topographical Art Collection

View of a manor house, traditionally identified as Stocks_House, Hertfordshire, 1734, Private Collection

View of Windsor Castle from the North, National_Trust
