= Gennaro Greco =

Italian painter

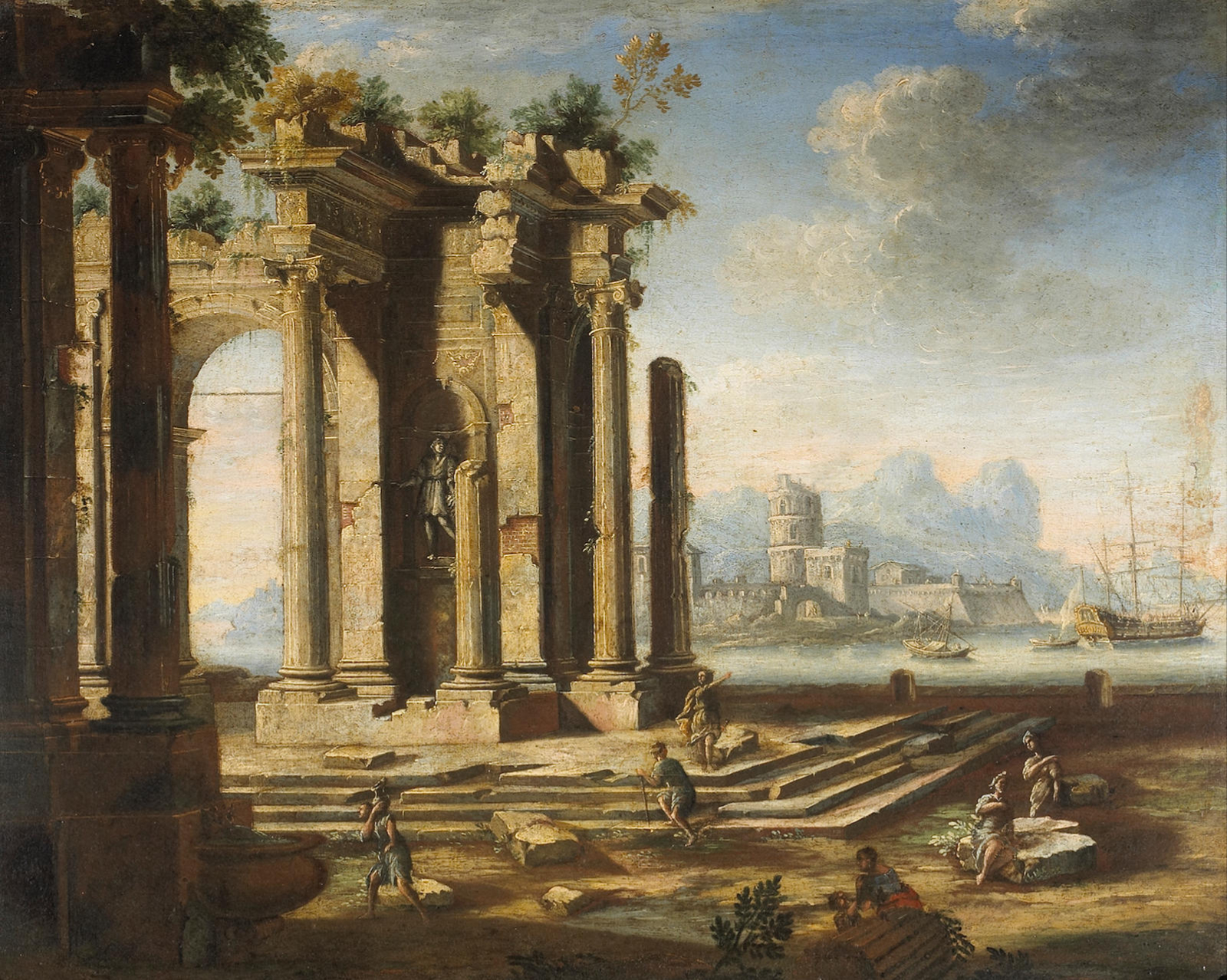
Classical ruins with a seascape in the distance

Gennaro Greco also known as "Il Mascacotta" (1663–1714) was an Italian architectural painter who was active in Naples during the late Baroque period. He is known for his architectural paintings, capricci, compositions with ruins, as well as his vedute. His vedute fall mostly in the category of the so-called vedute ideate which represent closely observed views of completely imaginary landscapes.

== Life ==
Greco was born and worked in Naples. He was nicknamed 'il Mascacotta' (the Cooked Face) due to a severe burn that had deformed his face. He originally trained as an ornamental painter. In that role he painted the stages for religious celebrations and the perspectival frameworks in the works of other artists. He was inspired to paint vedute after studying works by Andrea Pozzo. Pozzo had written a treatise about perspective for painters and architects, the Perspectiva pictorum et architectorum (1693-1700). Pozzo promoted in the treatise the practice of vedute ideata, i.e. realistic-looking landscapes that combine illusionist architectural detail with fantastic elements.

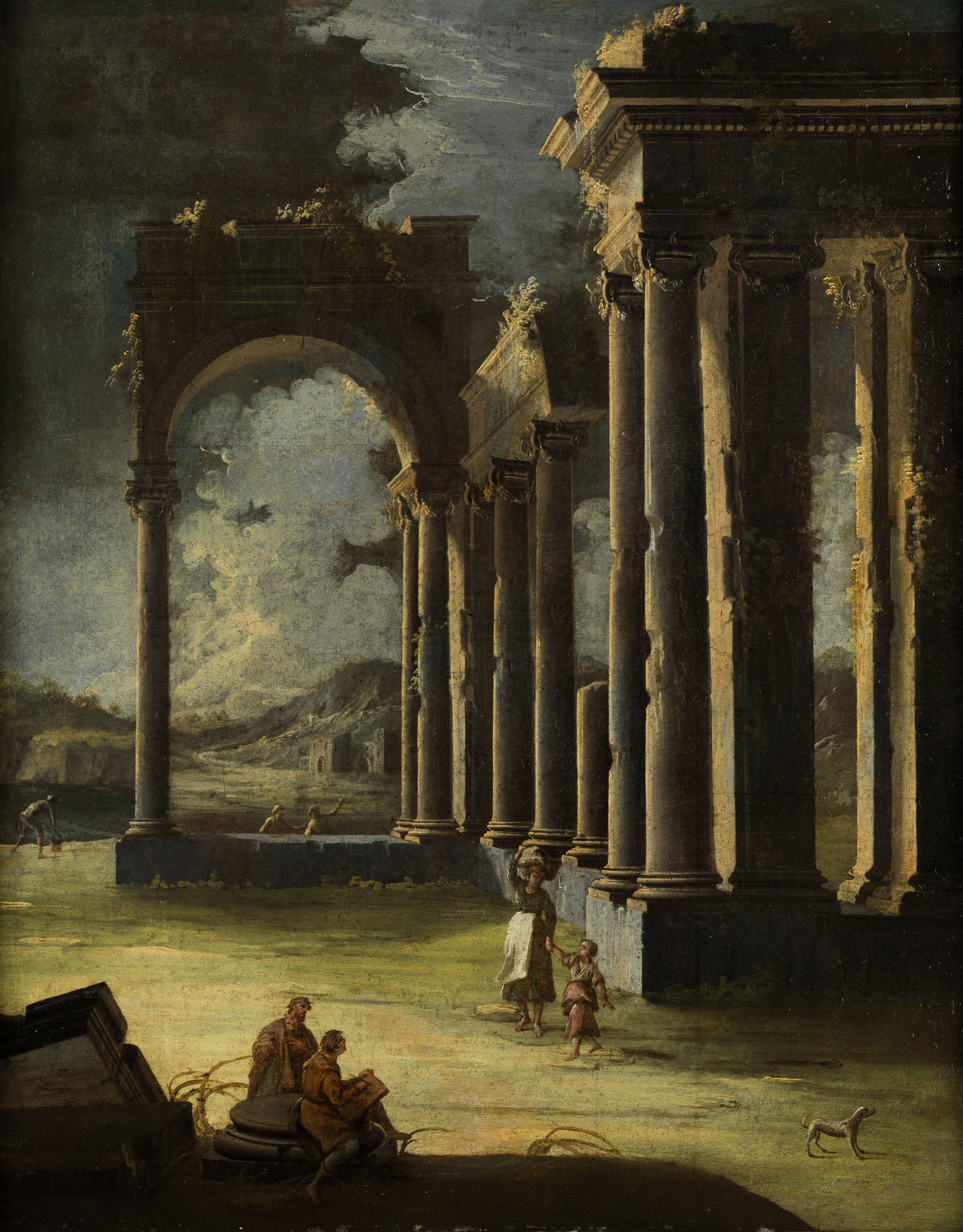
Antique ruins with figure staffage in nocturnal light

Greco was successful and became prosperous. His biographers mention that he married three times to pretty, young wives and had many children. His son Vincenzo (active in Naples in the early decades of the 18th century - 1733) also became an architectural painter.

Greco died after falling off a scaffolding while working on a fresco on a church vault in nearby Nola.

== Work ==
He is described by the 19th-century Italian art historian Carlo Tito Dalbono as a painter of views of mutilated ruins (vedute di mutilato anticaglie). Most of Greco's paintings are paintings of architecture, either ruins, ideal architecture, or capricci, in a landscape setting. He was known for creating so-called vedute ideate which represent detailed landscapes which are completely imaginary.

This type of decorative architectural paintings are a form that became popular in mid-17th-century Rome. Art historians interpret the growing popularity of the architectural piece in 17th century Italy as the result of a shift of patronage from 'committente' to 'acquirente', that is, from painting on commission to painting on the open market. Architectural canvases were particularly welcome within the typical 17th-century decorative ensemble, where walls were completely covered with paintings of various types and sizes. The architectural piece lent variety to such ensembles by introducing the strong verticals and horizontals of its subject matter. The roots of this type of vedute can be found in 16th-century painting, and in particular in the architectural settings that were painted as the framework of large-scale frescoes and ceiling decorations known as quadratura. These architectural elements gained prominence in 17th-century painting to become stand-alone subjects of easel paintings.

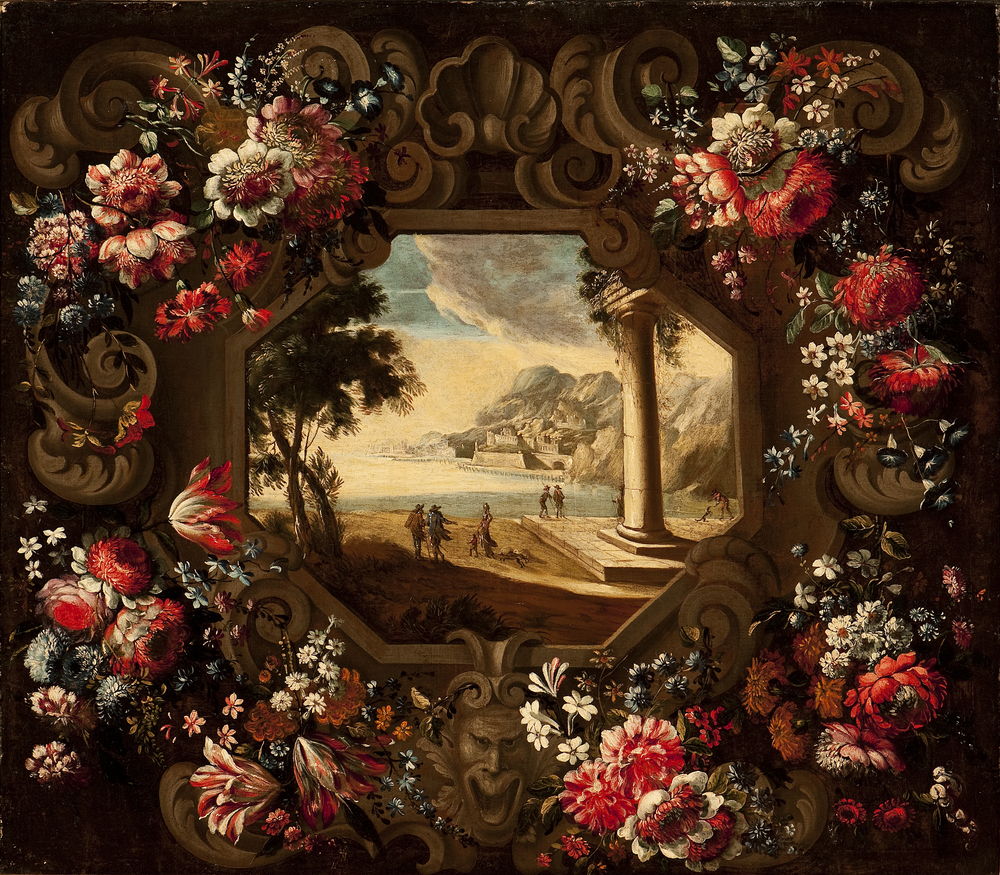
Flower garland and marine landscape of the Golf of Gaeta, with Abraham Brueghel

A number of artists practised this genre. Alessandro Salucci, Viviano Codazzi and Ascanio Luciani were important 17th-century practitioners of the genre. Codazzi worked in Naples from 1633 to 1647, and Luciani was a contemporary of Greco in Naples. Greco's architectural compositions are a link between Viviano Codazzi and the Neapolitan whims of Leonardo Coccorante (active in Naples in the first half of the 18th century).

Greco's mature work depicts imaginary ruins in a very carefully observed manner, often set by a bay with highly detailed ships and other structures. This is clear in the Capriccio with figures among classical ruins and ships beyond. In this composition, he created the illusion of depth by making the ruins lighter and lower contrast as they receded into the distance. The effect is emphasized by the fort and port structures in the distance, which are painted in purpley blues. He often depicted ancient ruins in a nocturnal, mysterious sphere. An example is the Capriccio with figures among classical ruins and ships beyond (at Hampel auction of 10 December 2015, lot 297). In this painting, the arch in the middle of the picture, as well as the temple complex with ionic columns, is illuminated by moonlight. The light source is covered by protruding tree tops. In the foreground, sitting on stone blocks, two men are busy drawing the ruins, a theme that reflects that period's emerging interest in Antiquity. In the centre is a genre scene of a woman carrying a basket on her head, accompanied by a child. Particularly noteworthy are the plants which are brightly lit by the moonlight in dark cornices. His works are placed within the movement towards Arcadian landscapes at the end of the 17th century in Naples.

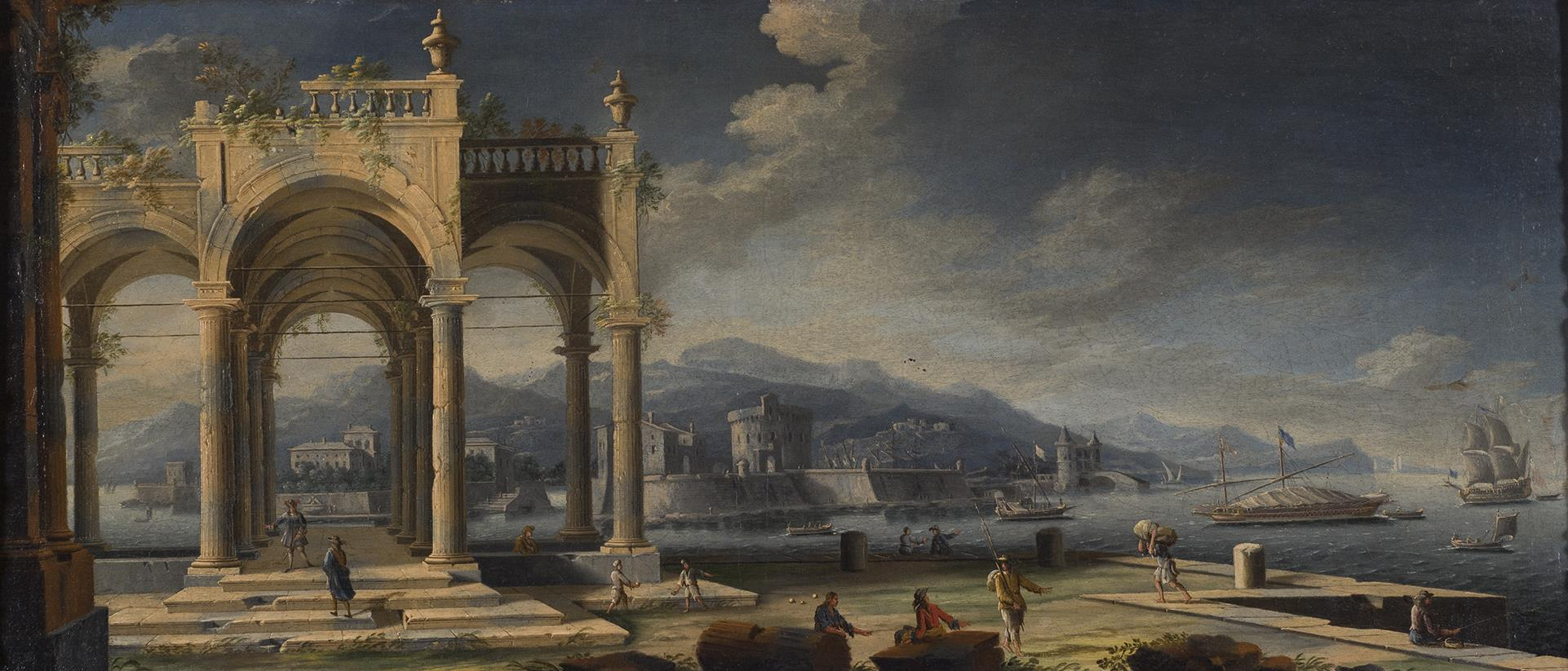
Capriccio of ancient ruins at a Mediterranean port with boats and bystanders

He also collaborated with specialist still life painters to create collaborative works combining landscape and still life painting. An example is the Flower garland and marine landscape of the Golf of Gaeta, a collaboration with Flemish still life painter Abraham Brueghel. It shows in the centre a harbour scene with figures in the foreground, which is surrounded by a flower garland. The work is characteristic of late 17th-century Neapolitan painting, which aimed almost exclusively at ornamental and decorative effect rather than at naturalism.
