= Jan Looten =

Dutch landscape painter

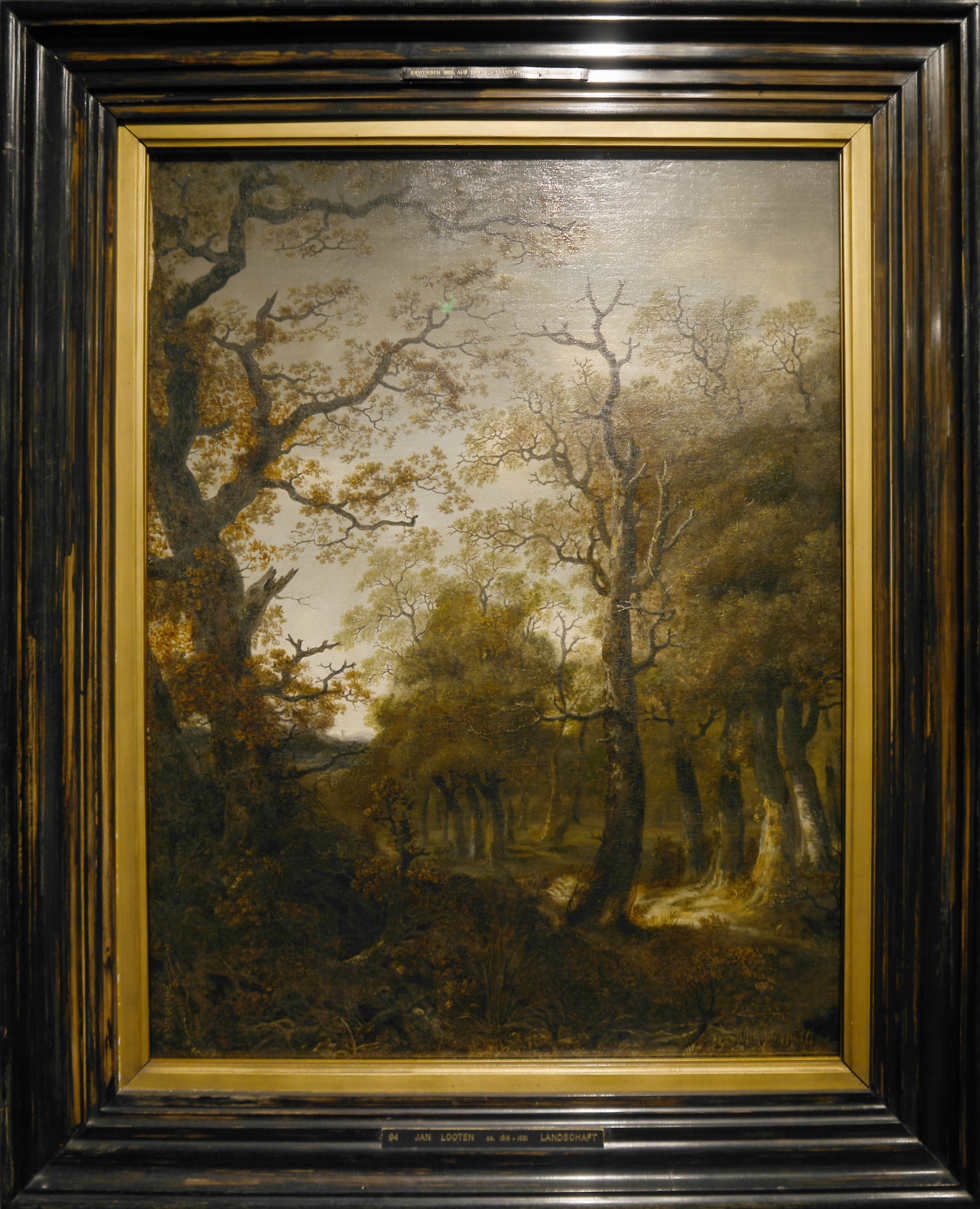
(Wooded) "landscape", 1650–1655, Hamburger Kunsthalle

Jan Looten (1617 or 1618 in Amsterdam – c. 1681 in the Kingdom of England) was a Dutch landscape painter. He is first recorded in Amsterdam at his wedding with Catelijntje Harmans in September 1643, as a 25-year old painter from Amsterdam, son of Laurens Jansz Loten. In or after 1664 he moved to London and later to York. Samuel Pepys reportedly visited his studio in 1669 and was "unimpressed" with his work and was recommended to Simon Verelst, who he saw more favourably.

He taught the painter and draftsman Jan Griffier.

Four landscapes attributed to Jan Looten are in the Royal Collection, two of which were painted in c. 1675 for King James II of England.
