= Jan Griffier =

Dutch painter

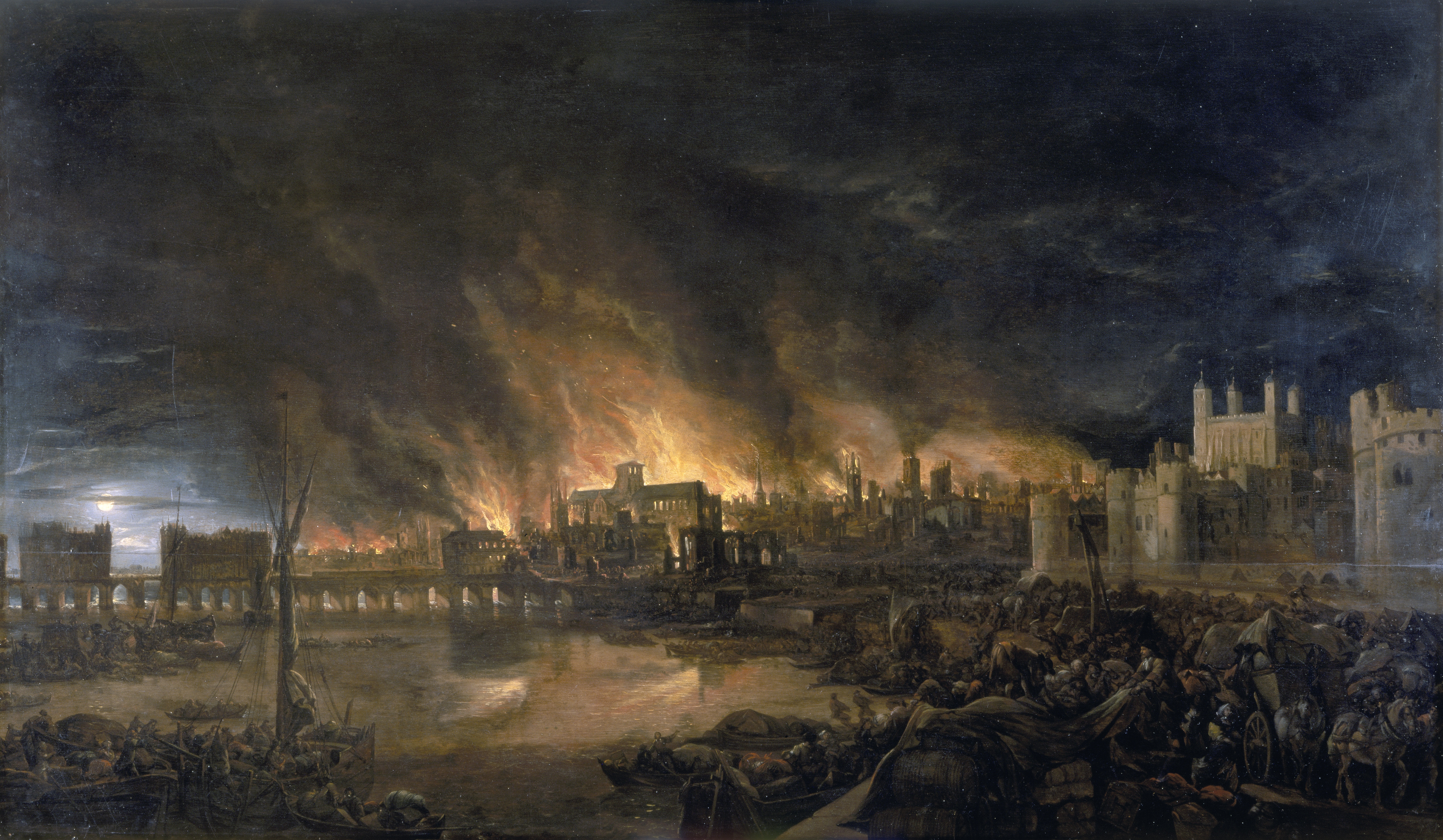
- Great Fire of London, 1675.
- Born: Jan Griffier; 1652; Amsterdam
- Died: 1718 (aged 65–66); London
- Known for: Painting
- Movement: Baroque

Jan Griffier (c. 1652 – 1718) was a Dutch Golden Age painter who was active in England, where he was admitted to the London Company of Painter-Stainers in 1677.

== Biography ==
Griffier was born in Amsterdam and learned to paint landscapes and to engrave from Roelant Roghman. His birthdate is uncertain. According to Houbraken he was born in 1656, and according to English accounts he may have been older by up to 10 years, but in 1700 he was registered in Leiden in the Album studiosorum of the university art academy there as being 48 years old and living on the Stadstimmerwerf.

He produced views of Rhineland landscapes as well as of the English countryside, and returned to the Netherlands for a decade after ca 1695, but was engaged for at least two decades in England where he worked for the Dutch painter Jan Looten (1617/1618 – c. 1681). Griffier's work as a draughtsman reflects his training by Roghman; as an etcher, he is remembered for a series of plates of birds after Francis Barlow.

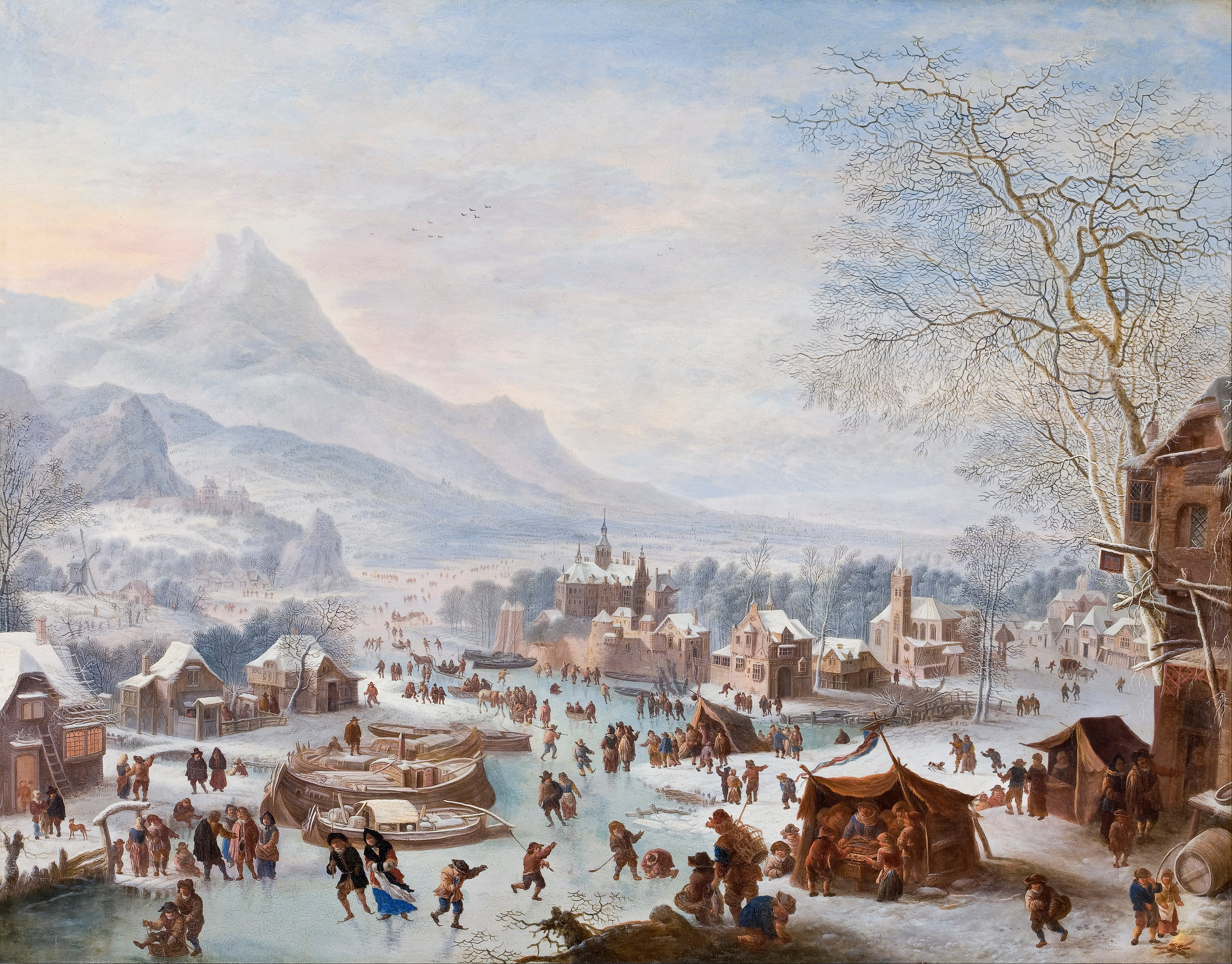
Winter Scene with Skaters

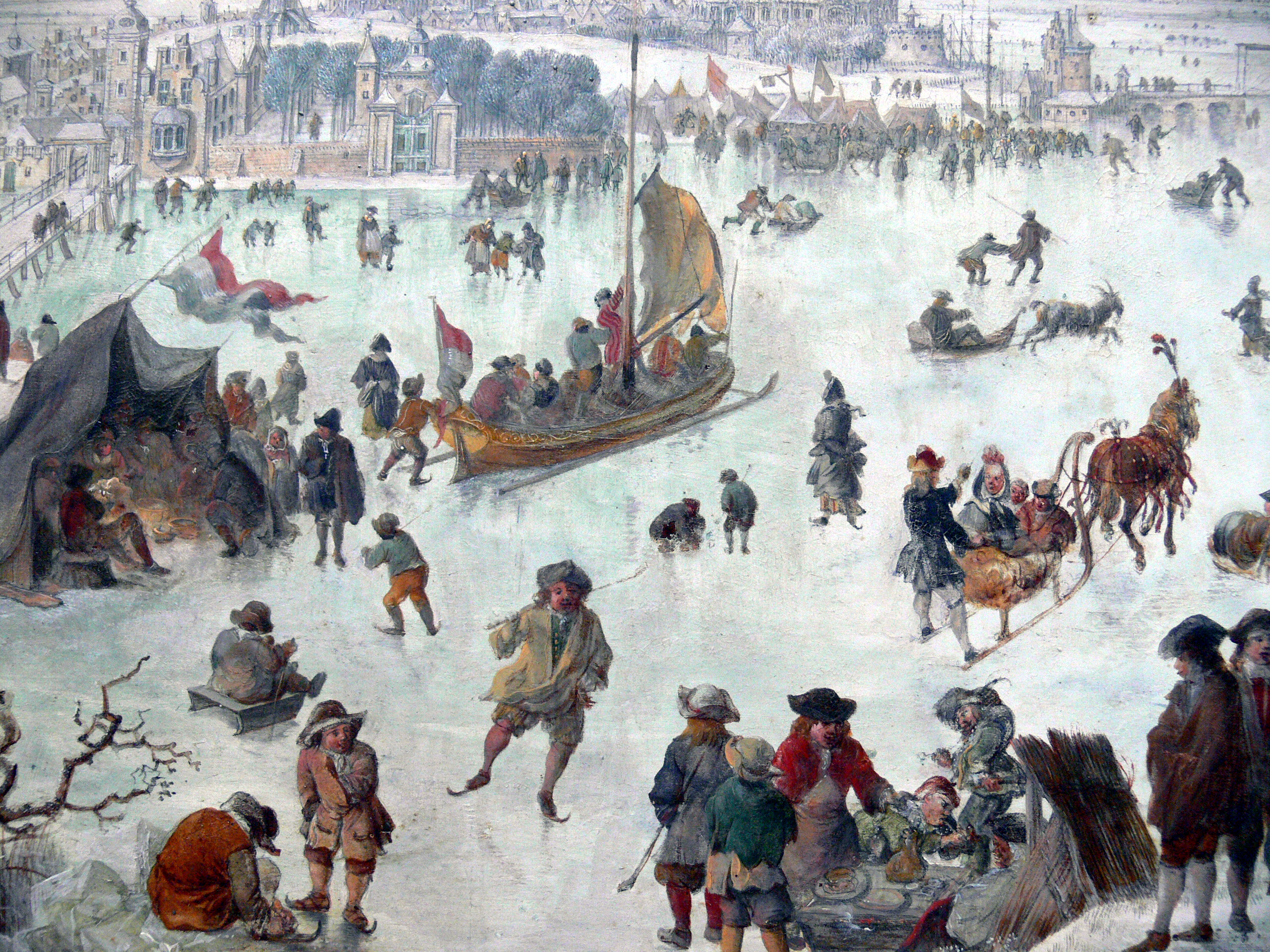
Plaisir d'hiver

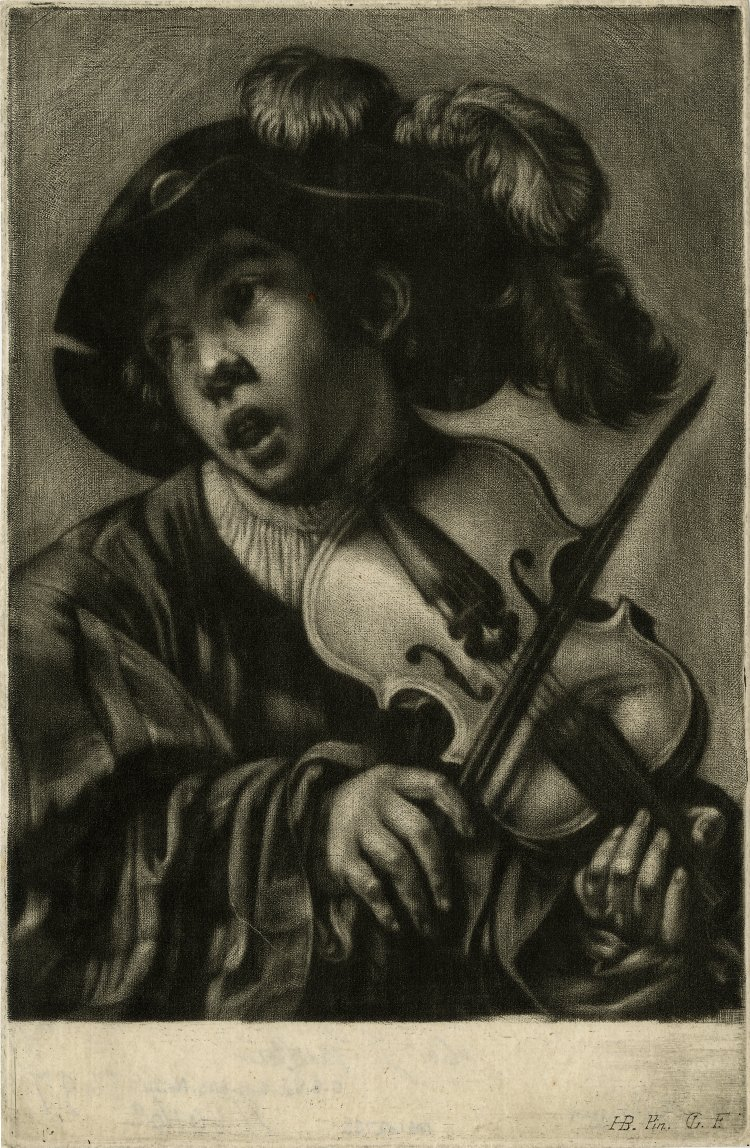
Mezzotint after Hendrik ter Brugghen

His mezzotints reproduce portraits after Sir Peter Lely, Hendrik ter Brugghen, and Sir Godfrey Kneller. His city views, invaluable topographical evidence, suggest that his travels in England were extensive. According to Houbraken he undertook a voyage by boat with his family to the Netherlands in 1695 that ended in shipwreck. All the paintings he had with him at that time were lost. He bought a houseboat in Rotterdam, which he then proceeded to use to move his family with him on his travels, continuing to make a living by painting landscapes. Eventually he undertook another channel crossing with this boat, but sent his family by a more seaworthy ship, since he was afraid of another shipwreck. This trip was successful and he died in London.

== Legacy ==
Apart from the biographical sketch that Houbraken wrote in 1718, much of what is known of him in England has been transmitted by Horace Walpole, working from George Vertue's notebooks.

Griffier's sons Robert Griffier and Jan Griffier the Younger continued the family landscape tradition.
