= François de Nomé =

Italian painter

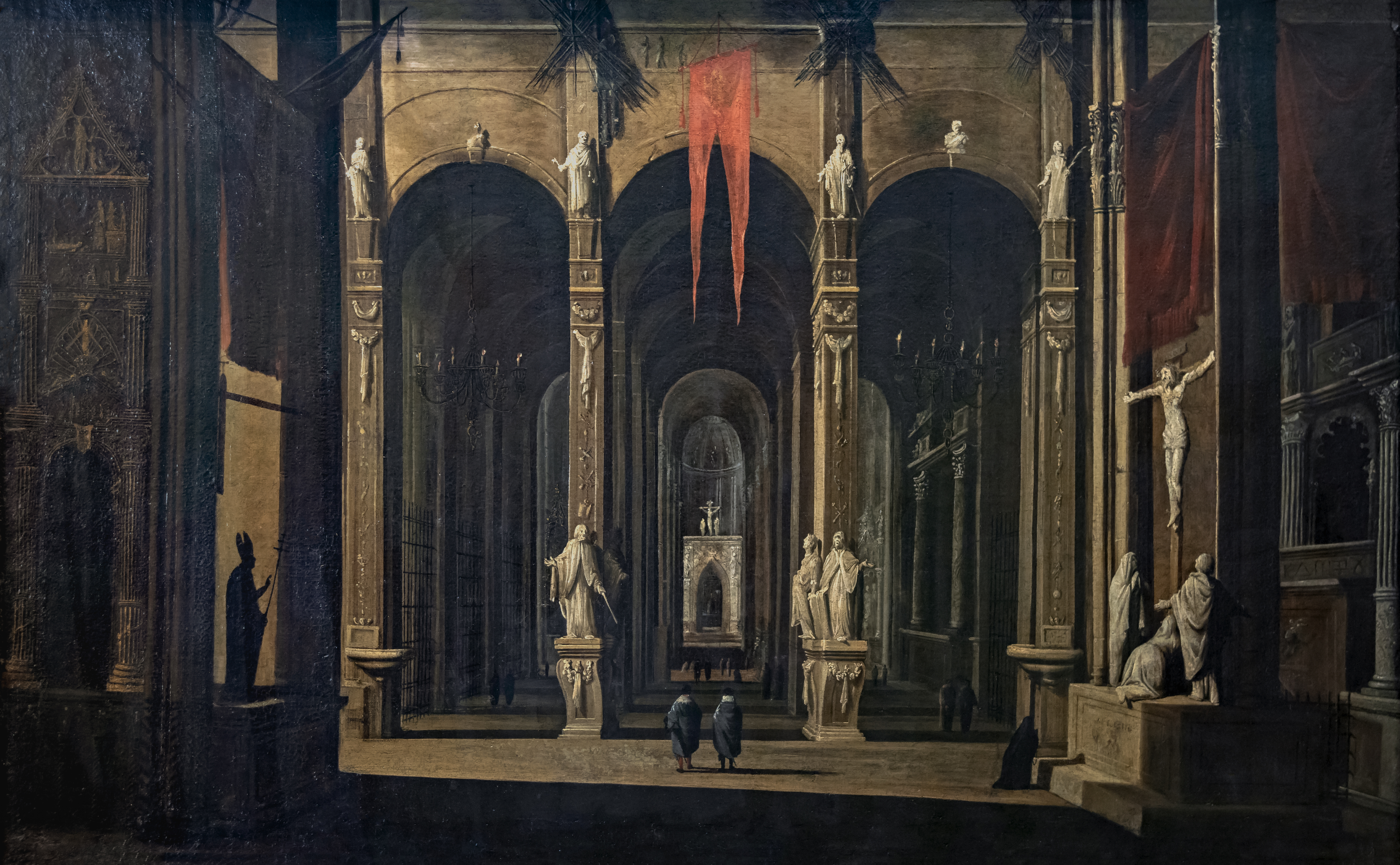
Santi Severino e Sossio in Napoles

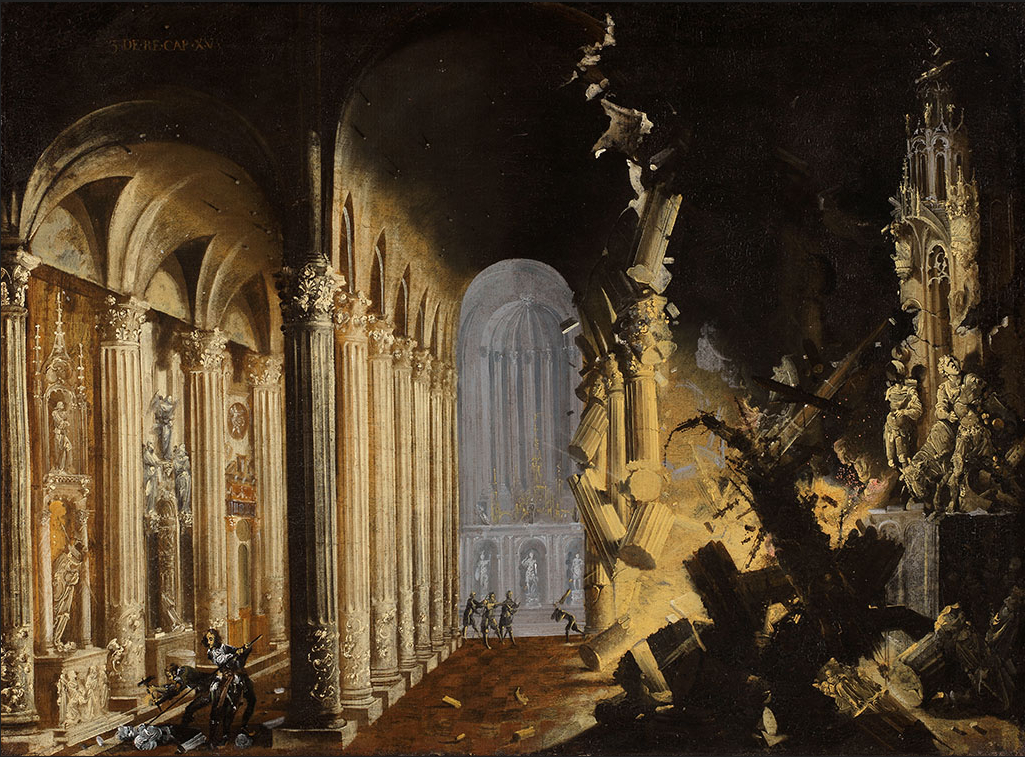
King Asa of Judah destroying the Idols (formerly, Explosion of a Cathedral)

François de Nomé (1593 – after 1620) was a French painter of the Baroque period, active mainly in Naples.

== Biography ==
Born in Metz in the Lorraine region in 1593, de Nomé had moved to Rome by 1602 where he worked in the workshop of the Flemish landscape painter Balthasar Lauwers until around 1610 after which he moved to Naples.

== Work ==
Until the mid-twentieth century, de Nomé's works were believed to be by one "Monsù Desiderio", but the works formerly attributed to Desiderio have since been identified as the work of at least three artists: de Nomé, Didier Barra, who was also from Metz, and a third, as yet unnamed painter. The figures in de Nomé's works were painted by other artists, including Belisario Corenzio and Jacob van Swanenburgh.

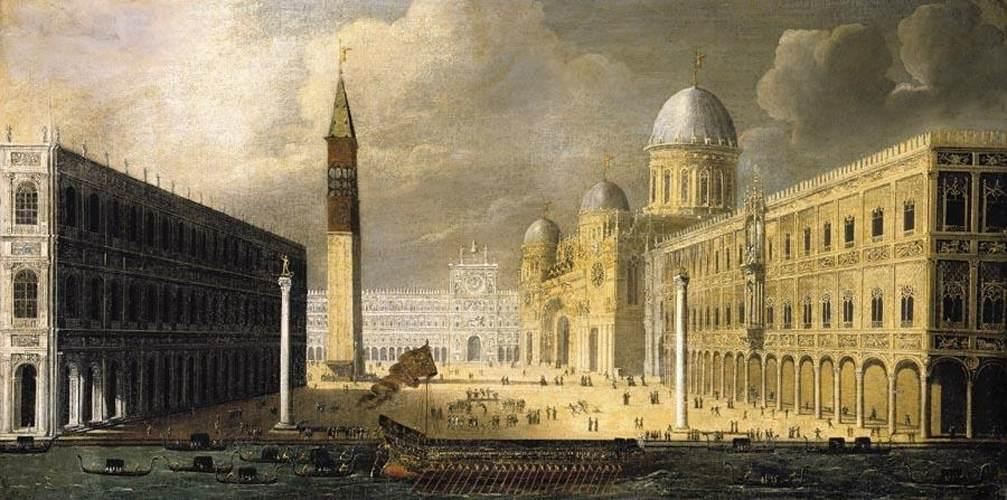
View of Venice

The themes are bizarre, typically decrepit ruins or near-barren buildings in a nearly-surrealist, apparently post-apocalyptic landscape. People are tiny figures, skies overcast, tonalities earthen, and edges indistinct. His depiction of Venice's Piazza di San Marco is correctly populated by the appropriate structures, but the details are all invented.

The style was not highly influential for Italian painters of landscapes (veduta) in the next century, with the exception of perhaps Alessandro Magnasco. However, the depictions of nightmarish wilderness amidst the detritus of civilization was a thematic adopted by painters such as Salvatore Rosa and Michelangelo Cerquozzi, and reappears in the capricci (whimsical and fantastic monuments, ruins, or buildings) of Piranesi.

== Gallery ==
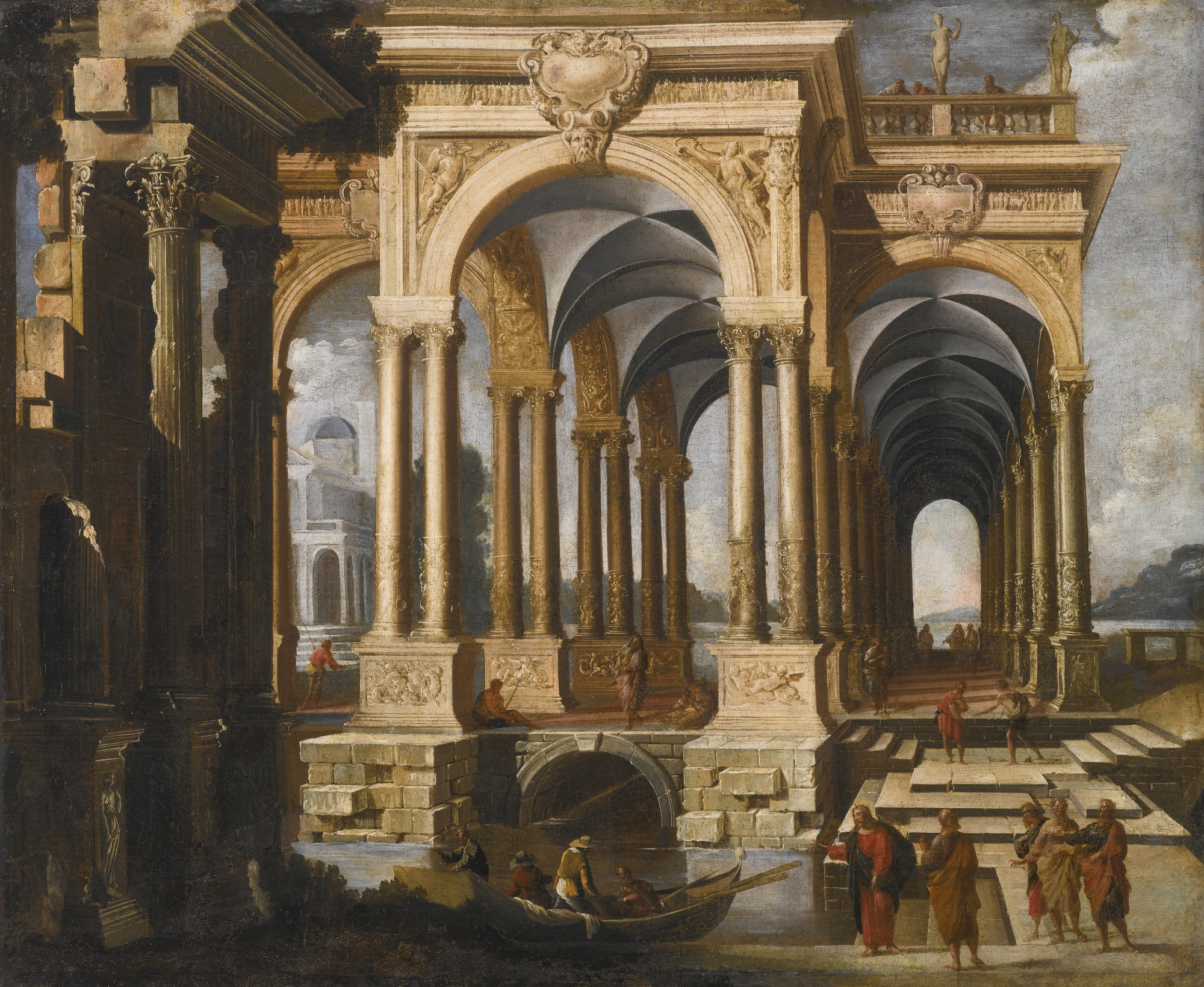
Architectural Capriccio with Christ and Disciples

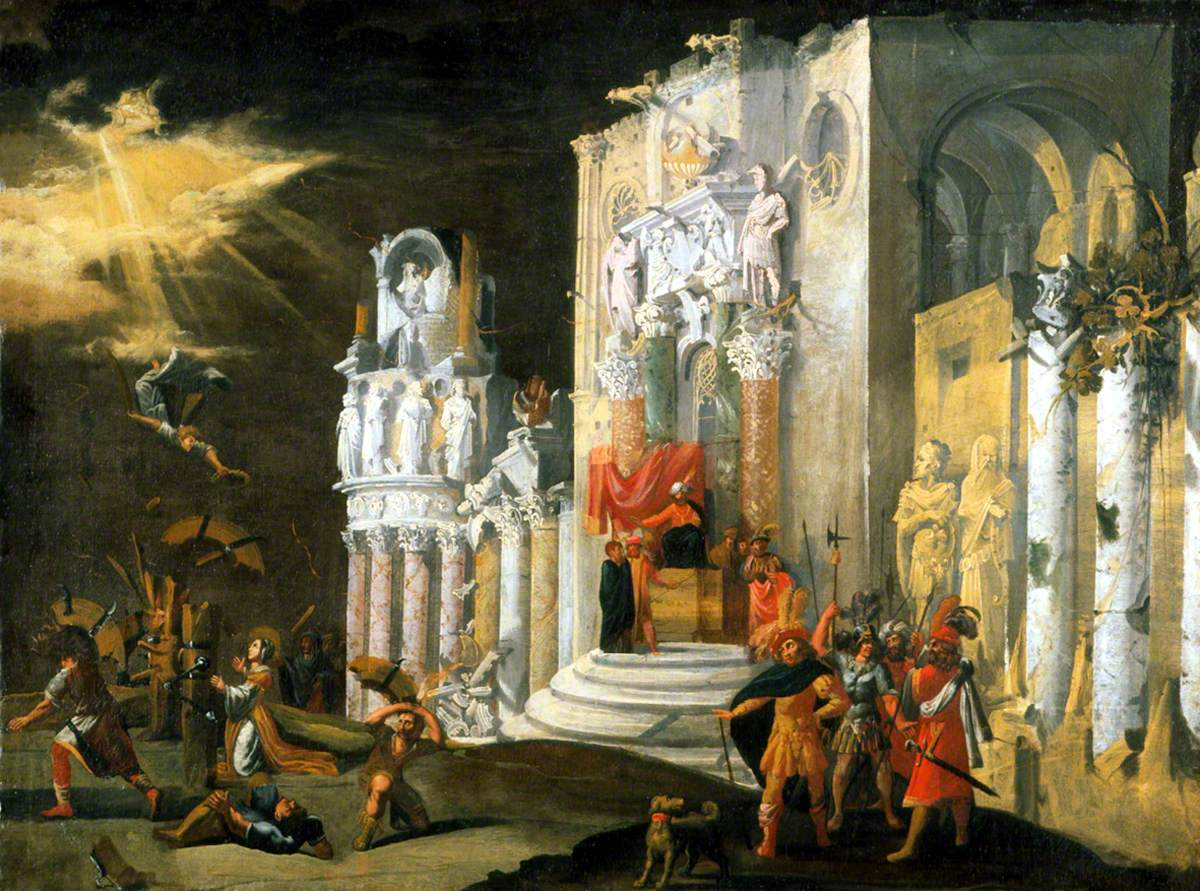
The Martyrdom of Saint Catherine

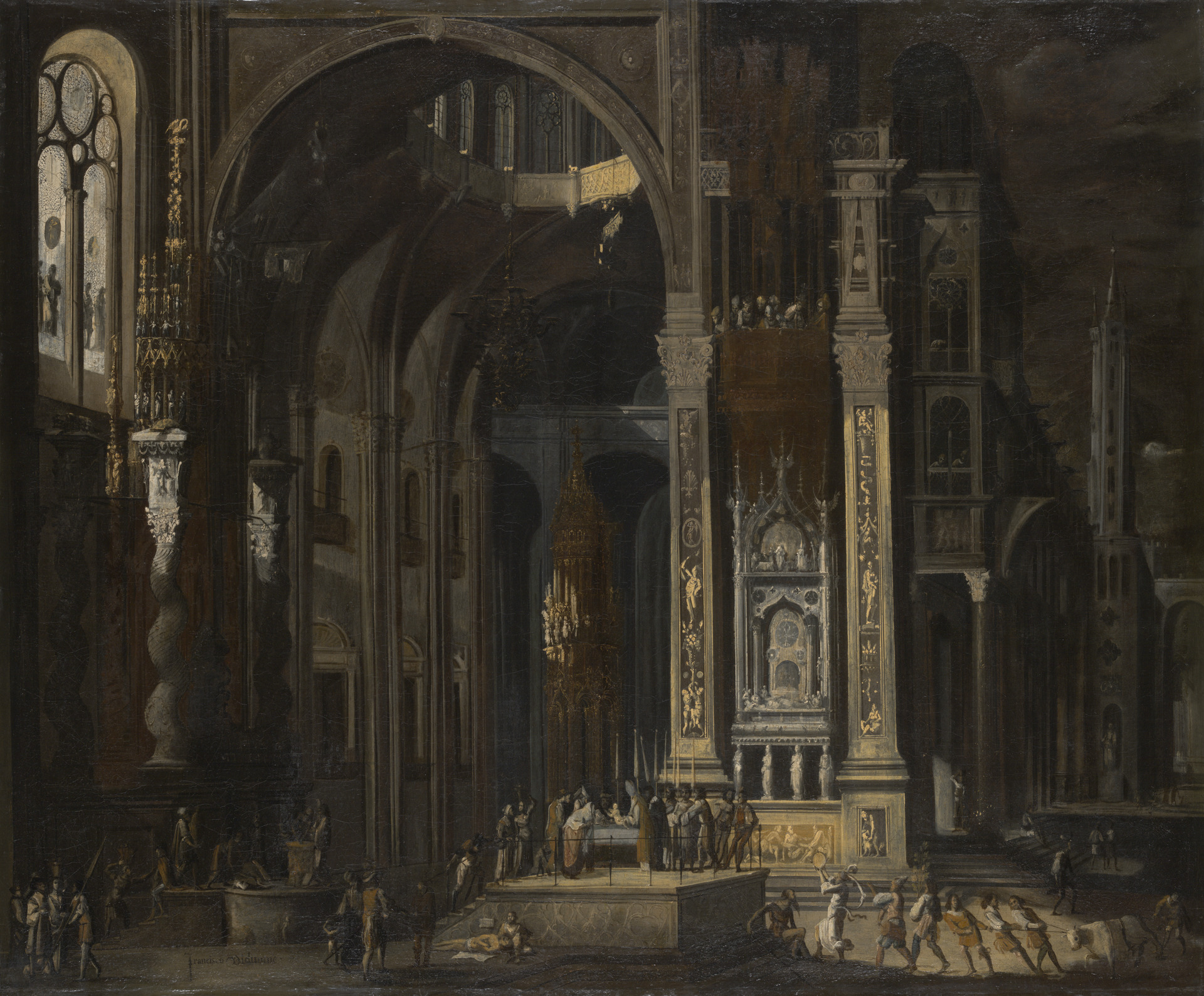
The Circumcision of Christ

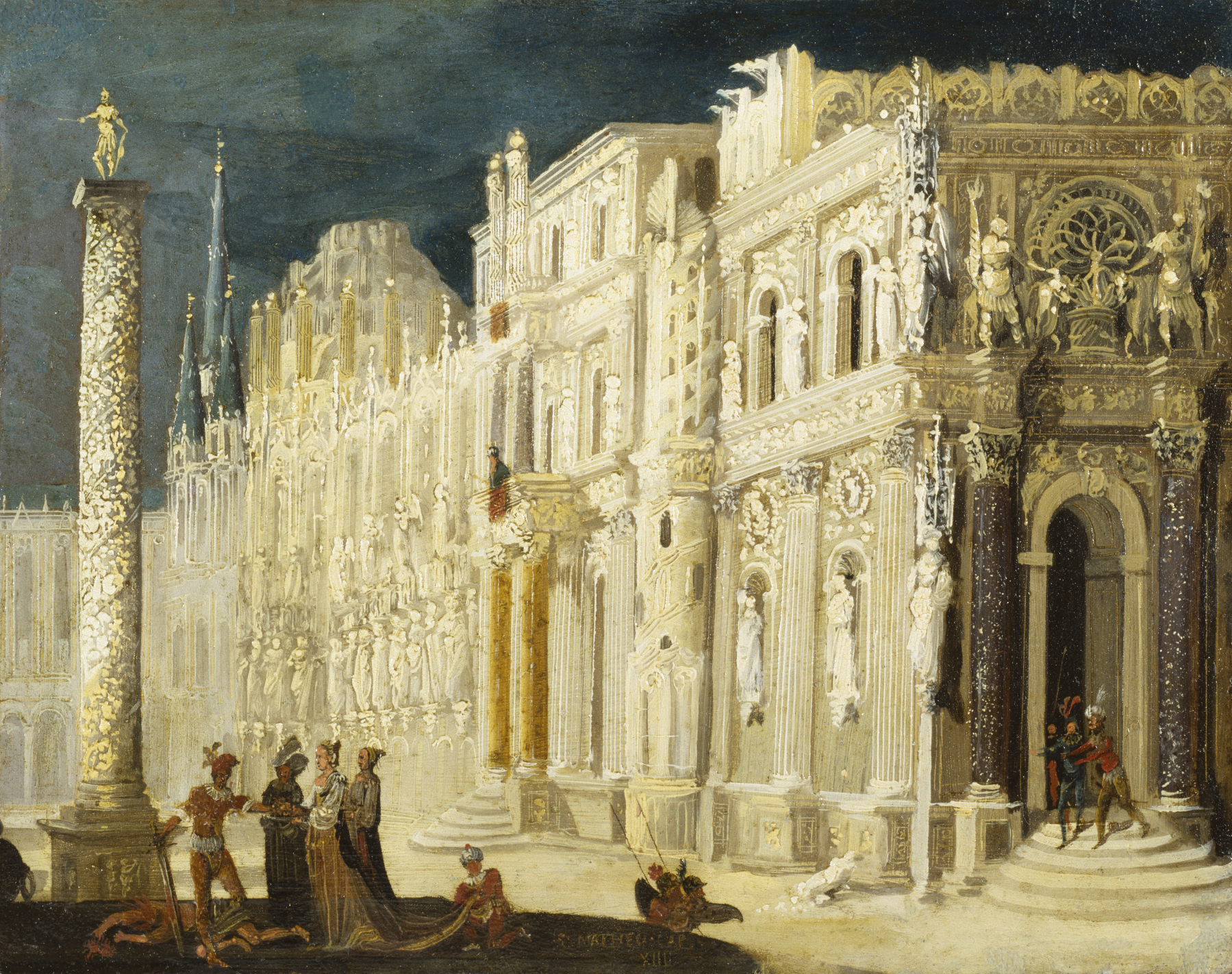
Head of Saint John the Baptist Presented to Salome, 1620-1624
