= Robert Griffier =

Dutch painter (c. 1675–after 1727)

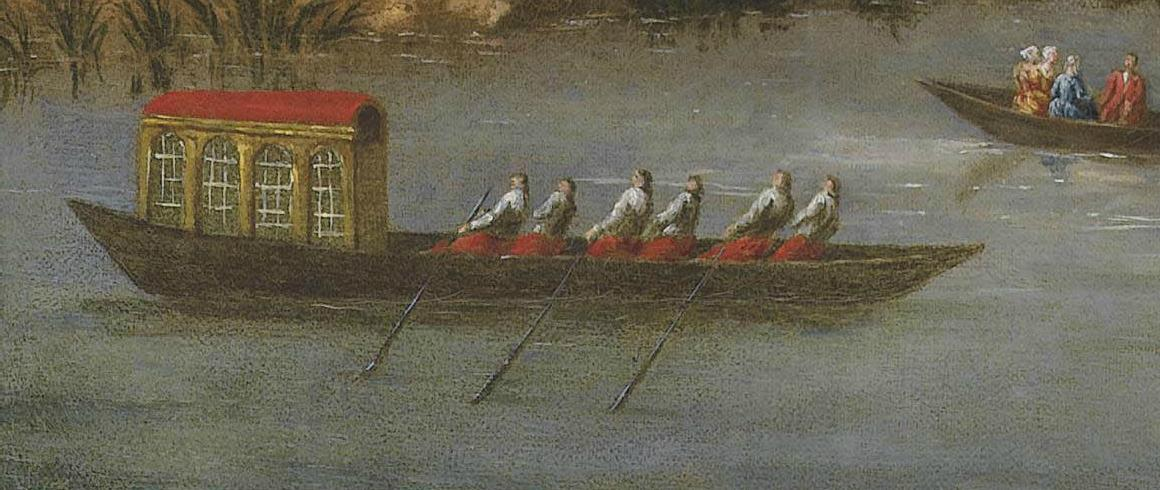
Detail of a rowboat on the Thames in front of Syon House

Robert Griffier (c. 1675 – after 1727) was an 18th-century landscape painter from London who was active in Amsterdam.

== Biography ==
According to Houbraken, Griffier was born in England in 1688 as the son of Dutch painter Jan Griffier, and learned painting from his father. He did not accompany his family when they moved to the Netherlands and so wasn't on board when they had their shipwreck in 1695, but was in Ireland. Before 1700 he moved to the Netherlands and after his father returned to England, he stayed in Amsterdam, painting Italianate landscapes in the manner of Herman Saftleven. The Capriccio of the City of London is adscribed to the circle of Griffier.

According to the RKD Houbraken, Griffier was born on 7 October 1688, but this is the birthdate of his brother Jan (John), who may have shared his studio. Some of his works are co-signed by Carel Breydel. From these his birth year is deduced as c. 1675. He became an Amsterdam citizen in October 1716. He went to London after his father's death in 1718. Jan van Gool wrote that he met Robert in London in 1727. Van Gool claimed he was a follower of Philips Wouwerman and Van de Velde who could paint "Rhine landscapes" and had on occasion painted figures in Ruisdael paintings. Griffier died in Amsterdam sometime after 1727.
