= Filippo Lauri =

Italian painter (1623–1694)

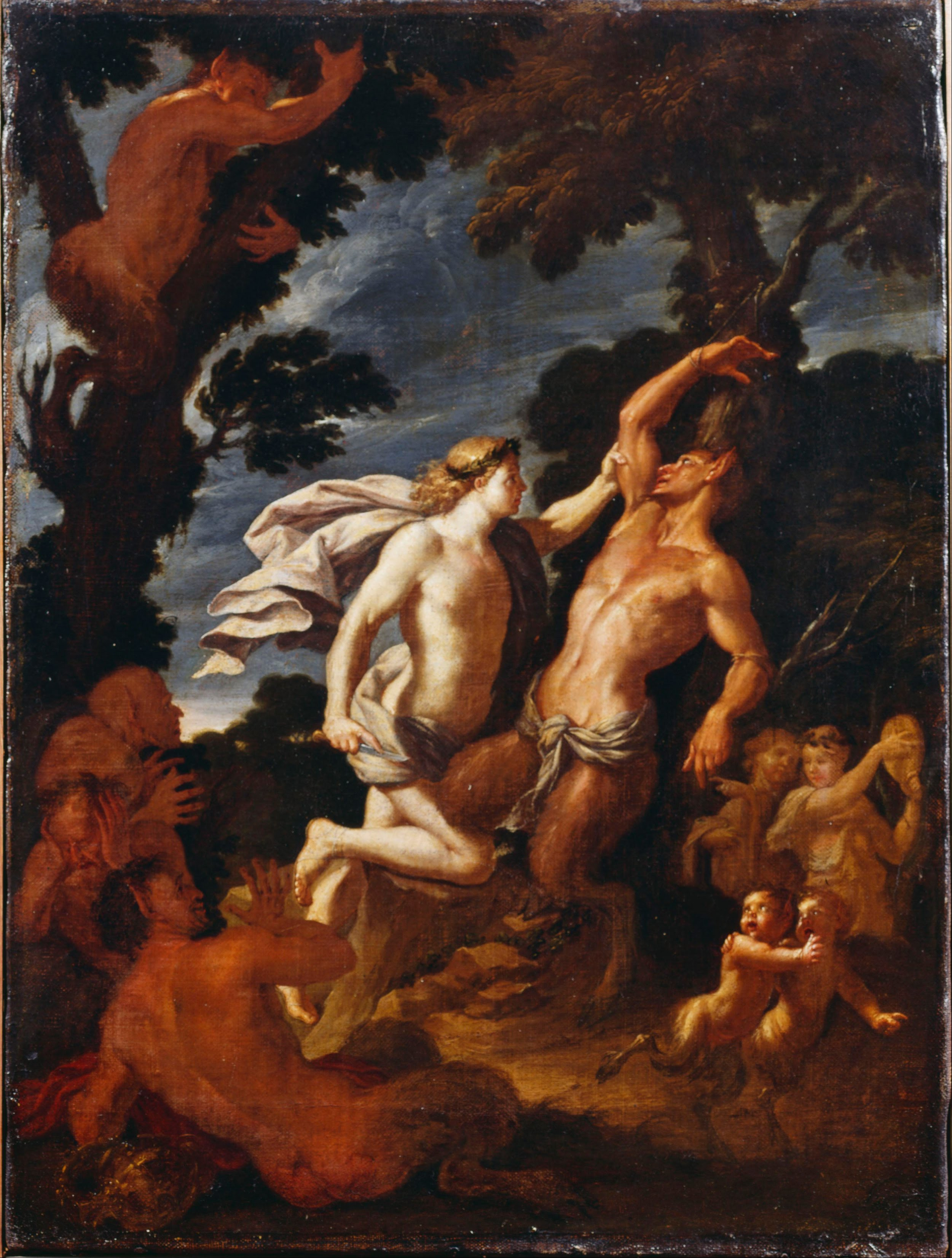
- Apollo and Marsyas, oil on canvas, Dulwich Picture Gallery, London
- Born: Philipp Lauwers; 25 August 1623; Rome, Papal States
- Died: 12 December 1694 (aged 71); Rome, Papal States
- Education: Francesco Lauri
- Occupation: Painter
- Movement: Baroque
- Patrons: Girolamo Farnese

Filippo Lauri (25 August 1623 – 12 December 1694) was an Italian painter of the Baroque period. A prolific artist, he painted both large decorative works and small cabinet pictures.

== Biography ==
Born and active in Rome, his story was featured in biographies by Francesco Saverio Baldinucci (1663–1738). His father, Balthasar Lauwers (Italianised as Lauri), was a pupil of Paul Bril, who had emigrated from Antwerp around 1600. Filippo's elder brother, Francesco, was also a painter and a pupil of the classicist Andrea Sacchi, an important figure of High Baroque Classicism. Filippo first studied with his father and then with his elder brother. Under Francesco's influence, he developed his own classicising style, deeply influenced by the last generation of Bolognese painters, particularly Domenichino and Francesco Albani. After the death of his brother in 1637, Filippo moved to the studio of his brother-in-law, Angelo Caroselli.

Baldinucci tells us that Lauri ‘worked with great originality in every kind of painting … rendering landscapes, fruits, flowers, animals and architecture’. His art was admired by princely Roman families, and among his earliest works were two frescoed ceilings (1651–c. 1653; untraced) for the casino built by Girolamo Farnese at Porta San Pancrazio. In 1654 Lauri became a member of the Accademia di San Luca, Rome, of which he later became Principe or director (1684–5). That same year, he painted a Flight into Egypt (untraced) for the church of Rocca Sinibalda, near Rieti. There followed three pictures (1656; untraced) for Sorrento Cathedral, and Lauri collaborated with Filippo Gagliardi on a large canvas, Carousel in the courtyard of the Palazzo Barberini in honour of Christina of Sweden (1656; Rome, Palazzo Braschi), adding over 200 small figures to Gagliardi’s architectural setting.

In 1656 and 1657, under the direction of Pietro da Cortona, Lauri participated in the decoration of the Gallery of Alexander VII in the Quirinal Palace, Rome, where he painted Gideon and the Fleece – in collaboration with Gaspard Dughet – and the Sacrifice of Cain and Abel. He also, according to Baldinucci, executed ‘a quarter of the chiaroscuro decoration’ (destr. 19th century) for the walls of the gallery between the frescoed scenes. In 1659 he was paid for a canvas, Spring, one of a series of the Four Seasons painted for Cardinal Flavio Chigi to adorn the Palazzo Chigi of Ariccia (in situ). Giacinto Brandi, Carlo Maratta, and Bernardino Mei also worked on this series, in which the still-life elements were painted by the flower painter Mario Nuzzi, better knownad Mario de' Fiori.

Venus and Cupid in a Landscape, Peckover House and Garden

Shortly after 1662 Lauri replaced Carlo Cignani on the decoration of the gallery of the Casino Farnese in Rome, for which only bozzetti remain (Rome, priv. col.). On the ceiling he painted the Four Seasons and on the walls ‘beautiful architectural ornament, enriched by festoons, foliage and statues painted in chiaroscuro’. Around 1668–70 Lauri frescoed two scenes, the Expulsion of Adam and Eve from Paradise and Adam and Eve with the Infants Cain and Abel after the Fall, on either side of a window in the lunette of the Mignanelli Chapel, Santa Maria della Pace, Rome, a commission he won through Pietro da Cortona. There followed, in 1671, his most famous surviving work, the decoration of a small room in the Palazzo Borghese, Rome, with a ceiling painting, the Marriage of Bacchus and Ariadne, and over the windows small tondi with Ovidian scenes. Lauri decorated the walls with mythological scenes, Latona with the Sun and Moon, Diana and Actaeon, the Birth of Adonis and Venus and Mars, again in collaboration with Gaspard Dughet, with whom he worked until the latter’s death in 1675. Bozzetti for some of these decorations survive (Rome, di Castro priv. col.).

Lauri sometimes collaborated with other artists: he worked, for example, with Jan Frans van Bloemen on Hagar and the Angel (Castle Howard, North Yorkshire). Lauri’s small mythological and religious scenes, in landscape settings, possess an idyllic charm that anticipates 18th-century art. Among his many cabinet paintings, which were popular with collectors from northern Europe, are the Stoning of St. Stephen (Toulouse, Musée des Augustins), Venus with Pan (Montpellier, Musée Fabre) and Jacob’s Flight from Laban (London, Hampton Court Palace, Royal Collection). His Pastoral Landscape with Herdsmen and Animals (1682; Goulborn priv. col.) is a rare signed and dated painting, unusually close to Claude Lorrain. A small group of drawings securely attributed to Lauri is in the Royal Collection at Windsor Castle, Berkshire.

Lauri died in Rome on 12 December 1694, aged 71.

== Works ==
Saturn, oil on canvas, priv. col.

- Erminia among the Shepherds, oil on canvas, Palazzo Chigi, Ariccia;
- Carousel in the courtyard of the Palazzo Barberini in honour of Christina of Sweden, 1656, Palazzo Braschi, Rome;
- The Ecstasy of Saint Francis, oil on canvas, Louvre, Paris;
- Apollo Flaying Marsyas, oil on canvas, Louvre, Paris;
- The Stoning of St. Stephen, oil on panel, Musée des Augustins, Toulouse;
- Venus with Pan, oil on panel, Musée Fabre, Montpellier;
- The Elevation of the Cross, oil on glass, Musée Thomas-Henry, Cherbourg-en-Cotentin;
- Appearance of Christ to Mary Magdalene, oil on canvas, Hermitage Museum, Saint Petersburg;
- Venus and Adonis, Kunsthistorisches Museum, Vienna, Austria;
- The Vision of St. Bruno, oil on canvas, Božidar Jakac Gallery, Kostanjevica na Krki;
- Venus and Adonis, oil on canvas, Blanton Museum of Art, Austin, Texas;
- The Agony in the Garden, oil on canvas, Fitzwilliam Museum, Cambridge;
- Venus and Cupid in a Landscape, oil on copper, Peckover House and Garden;
- Pan and Diana, oil on canvas, Ulster Museum, Belfast;
- Saint Francis in Ecstasy, oil on Panel, The Box, Plymouth;
- Jacob’s Flight from Laban, Hampton Court Palace, Royal Collection, London;
- Apollo with Nymphs and Satyrs, and Mercury Stealing the Cattle of Admetus, oil on canvas, Hatchlands Park;
- Amor vincit Omnia, oil on canvas, Shugborough Hall;
- Apollo and Marsyas, oil on canvas, Dulwich Picture Gallery, London.
Apollo with Nymphs and Satyrs, and Mercury Stealing the Cattle of Admetus, oil on canvas, Hatchlands Park

Pan and Diana, Ulster Museum, Belfast

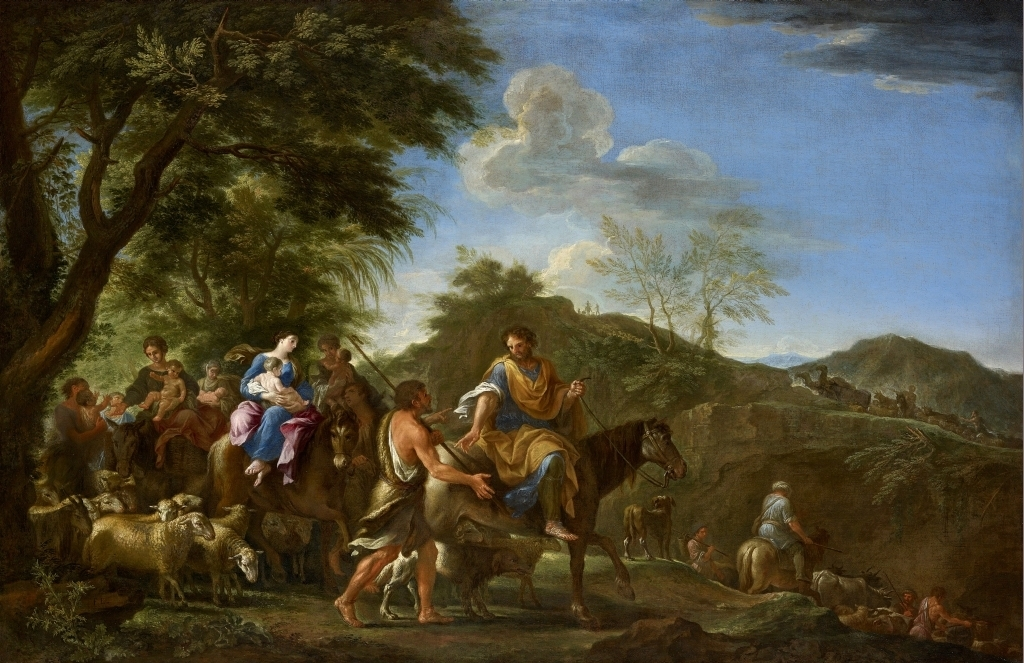
Jacob’s Flight from Laban, Hampton Court Palace, Royal Collection, London

Alpheus Pursuing Arethusa, Louvre, Paris

Apollo Flaying Marsyas, Louvre, Paris

Filippo Lauri and Pietro da Cortona, Circe and Odysseus, National Gallery of Denmark, Copenhagen

The Vision of St. Bruno, oil on canvas, Božidar Jakac Gallery, Kostanjevica na Krki

Appearance of Christ to Mary Magdalene, oil on canvas, Hermitage Museum, Saint Petersburg
