= Tommaso Donini =

Italian painter (1601–1637)

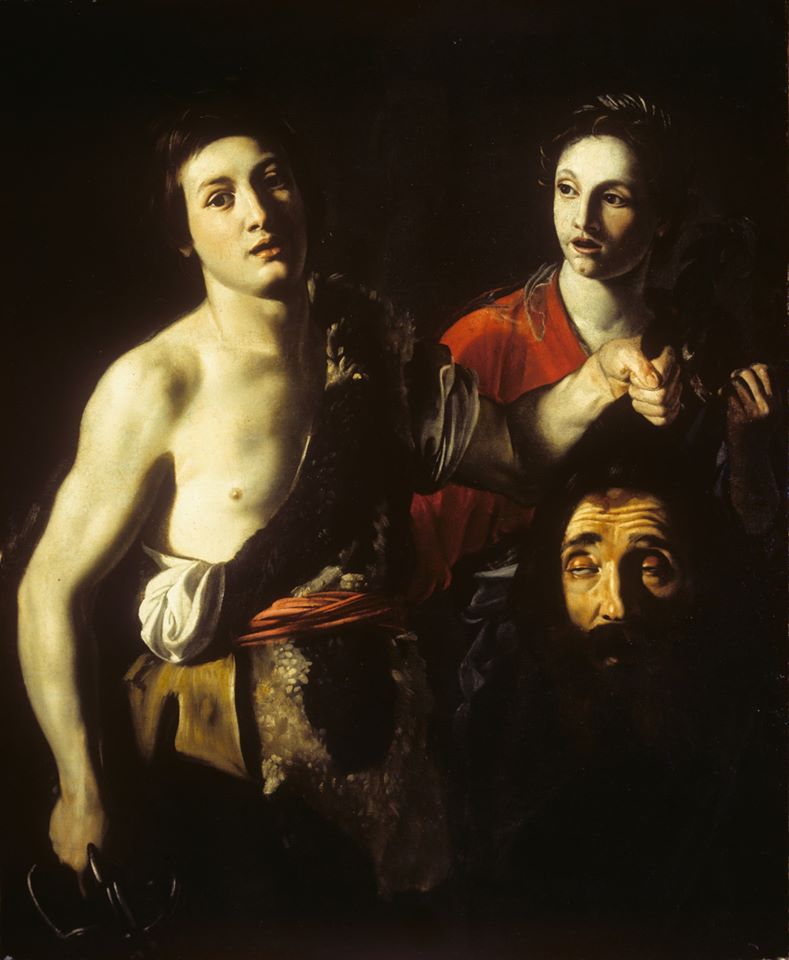
- David with the Head of Goliath, Galleria Nazionale d'Arte Antica, Rome
- Born: 21 December 1601; Rome, Papal States
- Died: 21 March 1637 (aged 35); Rome, Papal States
- Education: Giovanni Lanfranco; Angelo Caroselli
- Known for: Painting
- Movement: Baroque

Tommaso Donini or Tommaso Dovini, called Il Caravaggino (21 December 1601, in Rome – 21 March 1637, in Rome) was an Italian painter active mainly in Rome. He was previously erroneously referred to as 'Tommaso Luini' as the 17th century artist biographer Giovanni Baglione referred to him as such in his Le Vite de’ Pittori of 1642. Donini painted altarpieces. He was a follower of Caravaggio.

== Life ==
Donini was born in Rome on 21 December 1601 and was baptized on 24 December 1601 in the Santa Maria del Popolo. His father Marco was originally from Venice and was a gilder.

His masters were Giovanni Lanfranco and Angelo Caroselli. While attending the workshop of Caroselli, he was asked to study and make many copies of the works of Caravaggio. He became so skilled at this that he was soon working alongside his master, who himself was a follower and copyist of Caravaggio. This skill likely earned Donini the nickname Il Caravaggino. Alternatively, it is possibly that he received the nickname for being, like Caravaggio, an outsider with a short fuse and known for being litigious. In 1635 he was involved in a trial for stabbing another painter in the leg. He attended Andrea Sacchi's drawing academy between 1630 and 1632. Donini and Sacchi collaborated on works.

He died on 21 March 1637 in Rome at the age of 35.

== Work ==
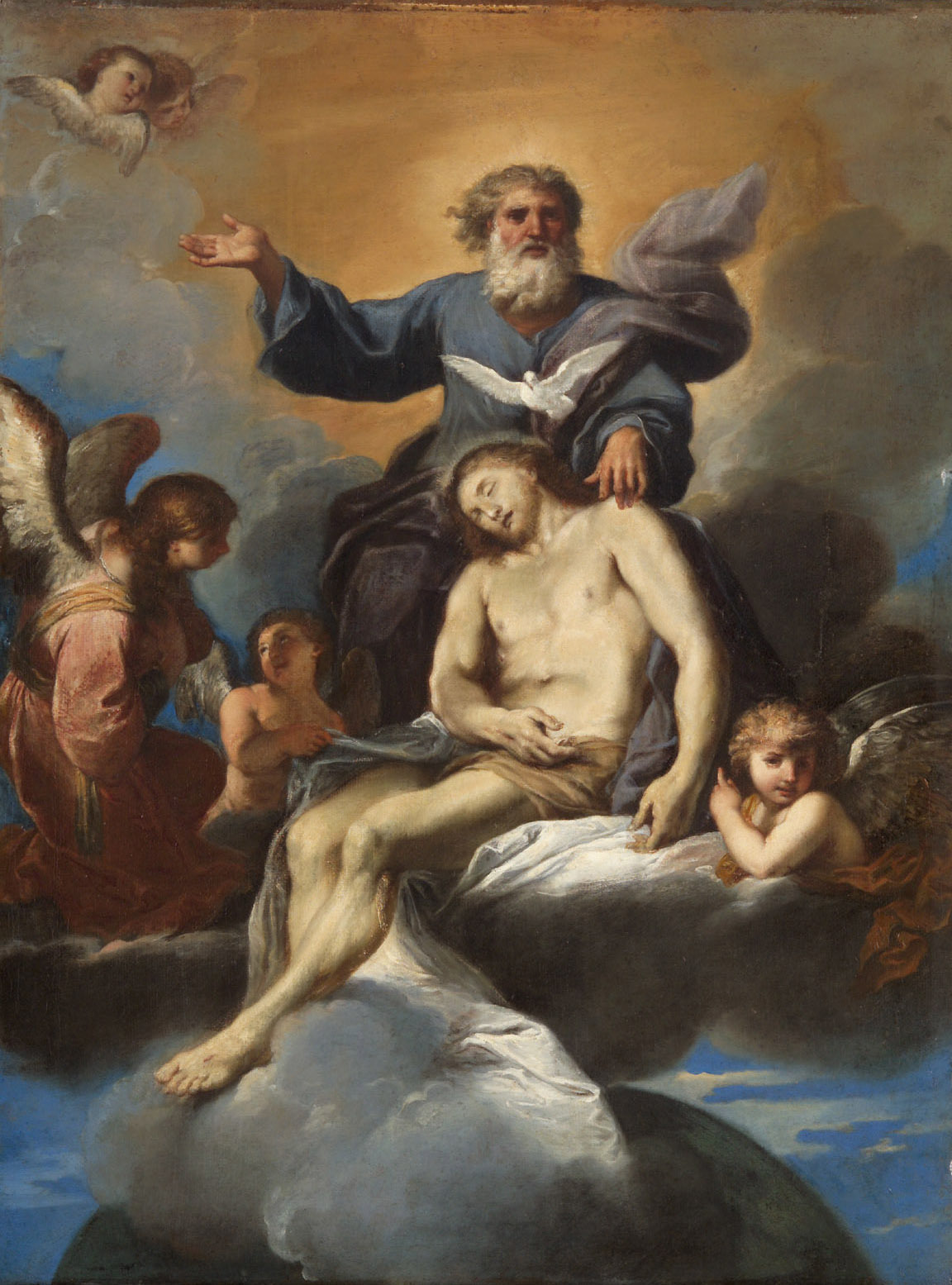
The Holy Trinity

His known works are few. His frescoes in the Minor Basilica of St. Lawrence in Lucina and in the Church of San Giuseppe a Capo le Case have been destroyed. There are still two paintings by his hand in the Basilica of San Carlo al Corso: a God and angels adoring he holy sacrament painted between 1627 and 1632 for the temporary high altar and later placed on the altar of the left transept and a Saint Ambrose in the sacristy. His Funeral of St. Filippo Benizi and Miracle of St. Filippo Benizi (both between 1630–1632) in the chapel of St. Filippo Benizi of the Santa Maria in Via are still in situ. Some art historians believe that Antonio Circignani painted a large part of the Funeral of St. Filippo Benizi.

Andrea Sacchi collaborated with Donini on the altarpiece for the Basilica of San Carlo al Corso. Sacchi also made a design for the head of one of the monks who witness St. Filippo Benizzi performing a miracle.

Other attributions to Donini include a Madonna with Child and Saints and a Saint Lawrence baptizing a neophyte originally in the San Lorenzo fuori le Mura and currently in the Valvisciolo Abbey and a Saint Francis renouncing his possessions in the San Carlo alle Quattro Fontane.

A David with the Head of Goliath in the Galleria Nazionale d'Arte Antica is also attributed to Donini. It shows an exhausted David lifting the severed head of Goliath. David's expression is one of exhaustion more than of victory. The young woman in the red robe standing behind him looks rather disbelievingly at the young hero. The emphasis on the emotionality of the scene and the choice of the moment immediately after the killing of Goliath show the influence of Caravaggio in this work. The illumination of the scene, which makes David's white skin shine against the extremely dark background, also testifies to the stylistic proximity to Caravaggio.

== Bibliography ==
- Baglione, G. Le vite de' pittori, scultori et architetti, dal Pontificato di Gregorio XIII del 1572 in fino a’ tempi di Papa Urbano Ottavo nel 1642. pp. 356–357.
- Titi, F. (1674). Studio di pittura, scoltura, et architettura, nelle chiese di Roma. Roma: Mancini. p. 383.
- D’Onofrio, C.; Pietrangeli, C. P. (1971). Abbazie del Lazio. Roma: Staderini Editore. p. 287, fig. 345.
- D’Amico, F. (1979). "Su Tommaso Donini detto il Caravaggino e sul Savonanzi". Bollettino d'Arte. LXIV (3): 79–86.
- Guarino, Sergio (1992). "DONINI, Tommaso, detto anche Caravaggino". Dizionario Biografico degli Italiani (in Italian). Vol. 41: Donaggio–Dugnani. Rome: Istituto dell'Enciclopedia Italiana. ISBN 978-88-12-00032-6.
