= Giuseppe Sacchi =

Italian painter

Giuseppe Sacchi (17th Century) was an Italian painter of the Baroque period.

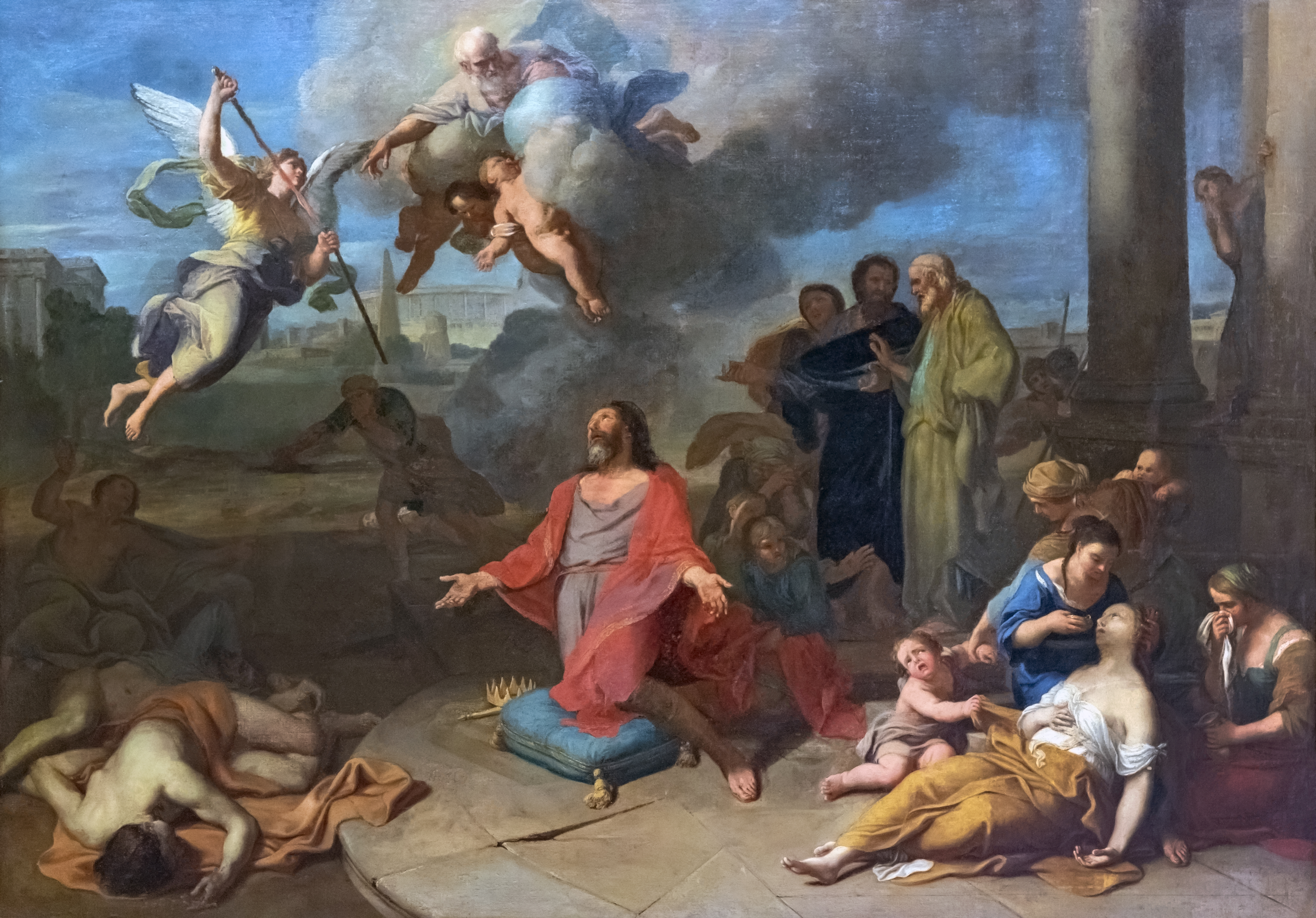
David in prayer obtains the cessation of the plague Musée des Beaux-Arts de Carcassonne

The son of the famous Andrea Sacchi, Giuseppe painted both historical canvases and portraits. He became a friar minor and died young.
