= Francesco Fiorelli =

Italian painter

Francesco Fiorelli (17th century) was an Italian painter of the Baroque period.

Fiorelli studied with Andrea Sacchi in Rome. He painted a life of St Benedict in the cloister of the Olivetans in Ascoli Piceno in 1615. He was buried in the church of San Martino in Fermo.
