= Francesco Lauri =

Italian painter (1610–1635)

- The Baptism of Christ, National Gallery of Denmark, Copenhagen
- Born: 27 February 1612; Rome, Papal States
- Died: 1635 (aged 22–23); Rome, Papal States
- Known for: Painting
- Movement: Baroque

Francesco Lauri (27 February 1612 – 1635) was an Italian painter of the Baroque period, active mainly in Rome, but also throughout other parts of eastern and northern Italy and some of France, Spain and Greece.

== Biography ==
He was the oldest son of the Flemish painter Balthasar Lauwers (Baltassare Lauri). His father was a landscape painter and pupil of Paul Bril, who had emigrated from Antwerp to Milan and then settled in Rome. Francesco's younger brother Filippo Lauri was also a painter and a pupil of Angelo Caroselli. Francesco was a disciple of his father and of Andrea Sacchi. He is said by Baldinucci to have painted one of the ovals in the ceiling of the Palazzo de' Crescenzi, and often painted figures for Claude Lorrain.

== Sources ==
- See Artists in biographies by Filippo Baldinucci
- Googlebooks entry
- Bryan, Michael (1889). Walter Armstrong; Robert Edmund Graves (eds.). Dictionary of Painters and Engravers, Biographical and Critical. Vol. II L-Z. London: George Bell and Sons. p. 25.
- "Lauri, Francesco". Benezit Dictionary of Artists. Oxford: Oxford University Press. 2011. doi:10.1093/benz/9780199773787.article.B00105330.
