= Angelo Caroselli =

Italian painter (1585–1652)

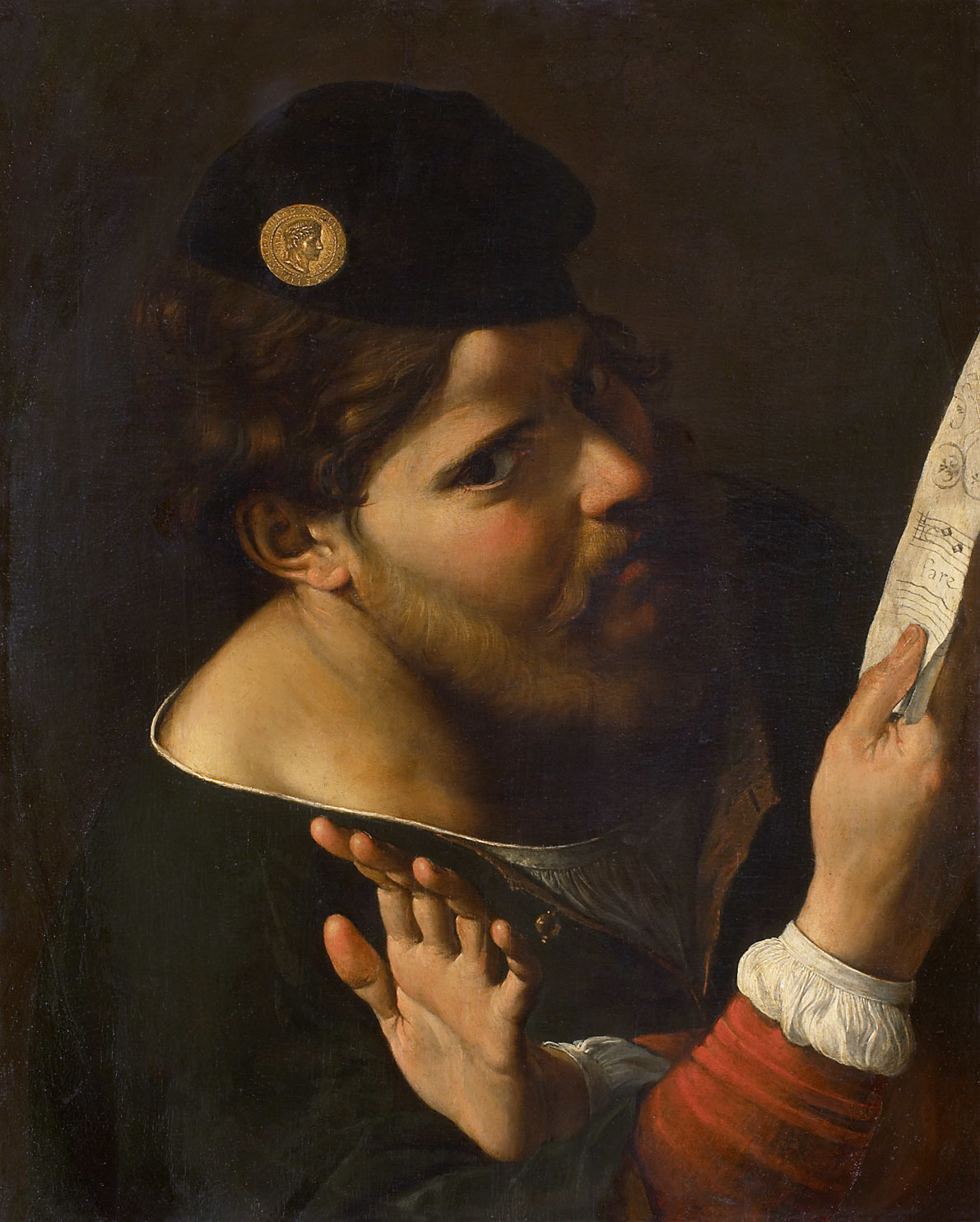
- Singing man, possibly a self-portrait
- Born: 1585, Rome
- Died: 1652, Rome
- Known for: Painter, art restorer, copyist, forger

Angelo Caroselli or Carosèlli (11 February 1585 – 8 April 1652) was an Italian painter of the Baroque period, active mainly in his native Rome. He created religious works, allegories, portraits as well as genre scenes in the vein of the Caravaggisti. He also returned regularly to scenes of witchcraft and sorcery. His style is eclectic style and shows influences principally from Caravaggio and the painters of 'low-life' scenes active in Rome called the Bamboccianti. His work is characterised by its search for originality. This is demonstrated in the potent naturalism and chiaroscuro that characterise his compositions and his preference for depicting colorful characters of contemporary Rome and scenes of witchcraft and musicians. The work of Caroselli was influential on other Caravaggisti such as the Lucchese painter Pietro Paolini and the Dutch painter Dirck van Baburen.

Despite the Caravaggist influences his work is characterised by its search for originality and a certain resistance to the triumphant absolutism of the Baroque style, which is expressed through some 'archaicizing' leanings in his work. Caroselli was also active as an art restorer, copyist, and, possibly, forger. In recent years a corpus of paintings has been attributed to a yet to be identified artist referred to with the notname of Pseudo-Caroselli. The style of the anonymous artist is so close to that of Caroselli that it is believed that this artist must have been in direct contact with Caroselli. The resulting similarity in styles has made it difficult to attribute certain works with certainty to either of the two artists.

== Life ==
Angelo Caroselli was born in Rome on 11 February 1585. His father was a reseller of second-hand gold and silver, a low-class activity in those days. He grew up in a popular neighborhood of Rome. Angelo did not get a formal training but was self-taught. He learned to paint by working as an art restorer and copyist. He became very skilled at copying older masters such as Annibale Carracci, Titian and Caravaggio. It is said that Poussin could not distinguish Caroselli's copy of a Madonna by Raphael from the original. It was rumored that he was also an art forger and passed some of his copies off as originals. Passeri describes how Angelo Caroselli dressed in a very strict Stoic fashion, giving up all luxury. This reportedly gave him a laughable appearance and had a negative impact on his reputation. However; this did not stop him from being a playboy who sought out the pleasures of love on which he spent much of his time.

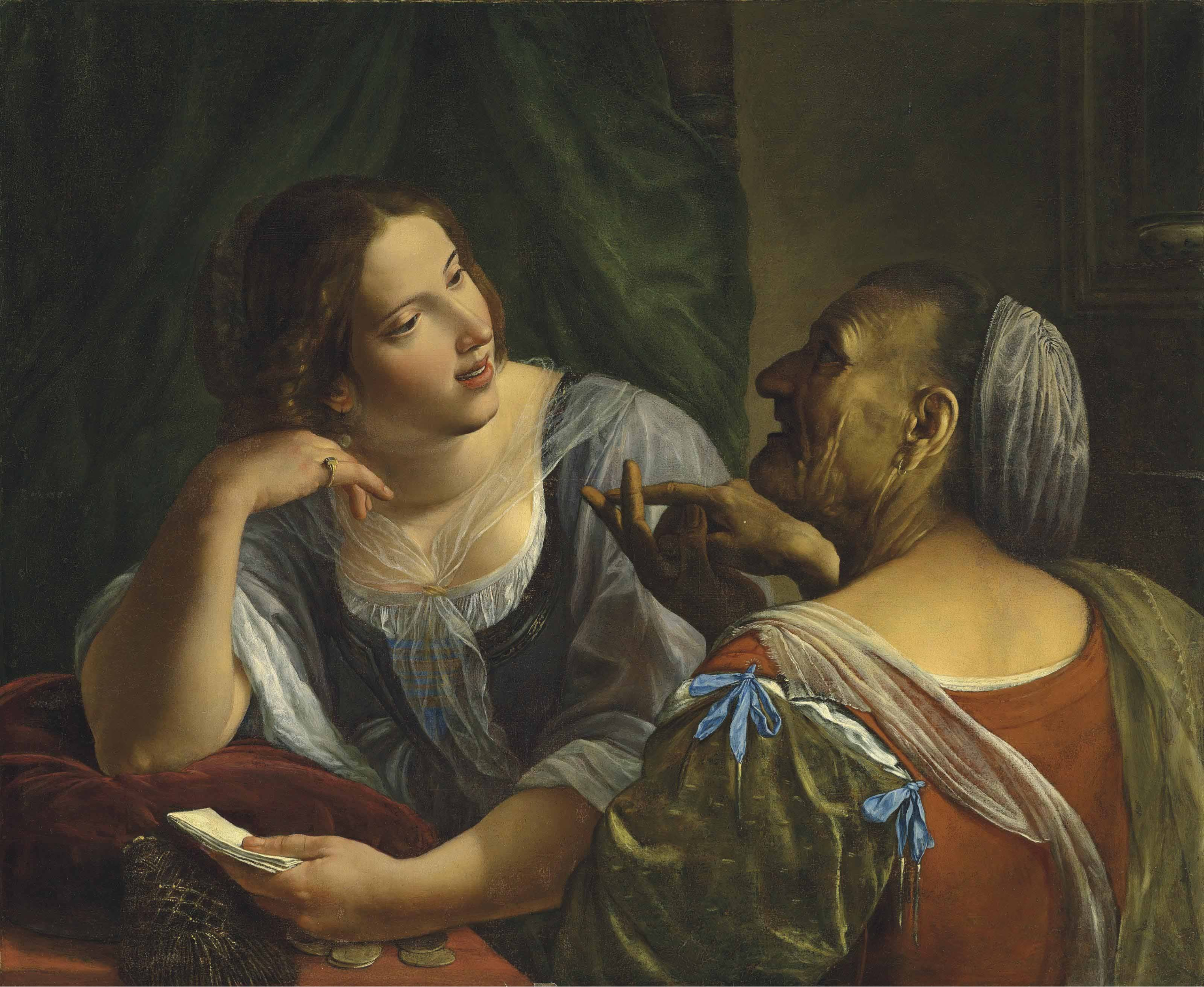
Allegory of Youth and Old Age

The artist spent time in Florence possibly in 1605–6 or 1610. Here he was employed to paint copies and pastiches of paintings particularly appreciated by Cosimo II de' Medici, Grand Duke of Tuscany. The artist joined the Accademia di San Luca of Rome in 1604 or 1608 and stayed a member until 1636. He was likely a non-voting member until he became 30 years old under the rules introduced by Pope Paul V in 1605. He was able to obtain important commissions including in the Chiesa Nuova. In this church he painted two Prophets and a Pietà in oil paint on plaster on the walls of the Vittrice Chapel ub 1611–12. Caroselli collaborated with the Caravaggist Giovanni Francesco Guerrieri during that artist's stay in Rome from 1615 to 1618. They jointly created Caravaggesque scenes for the Palazzo Borghese in Campo Marzio.

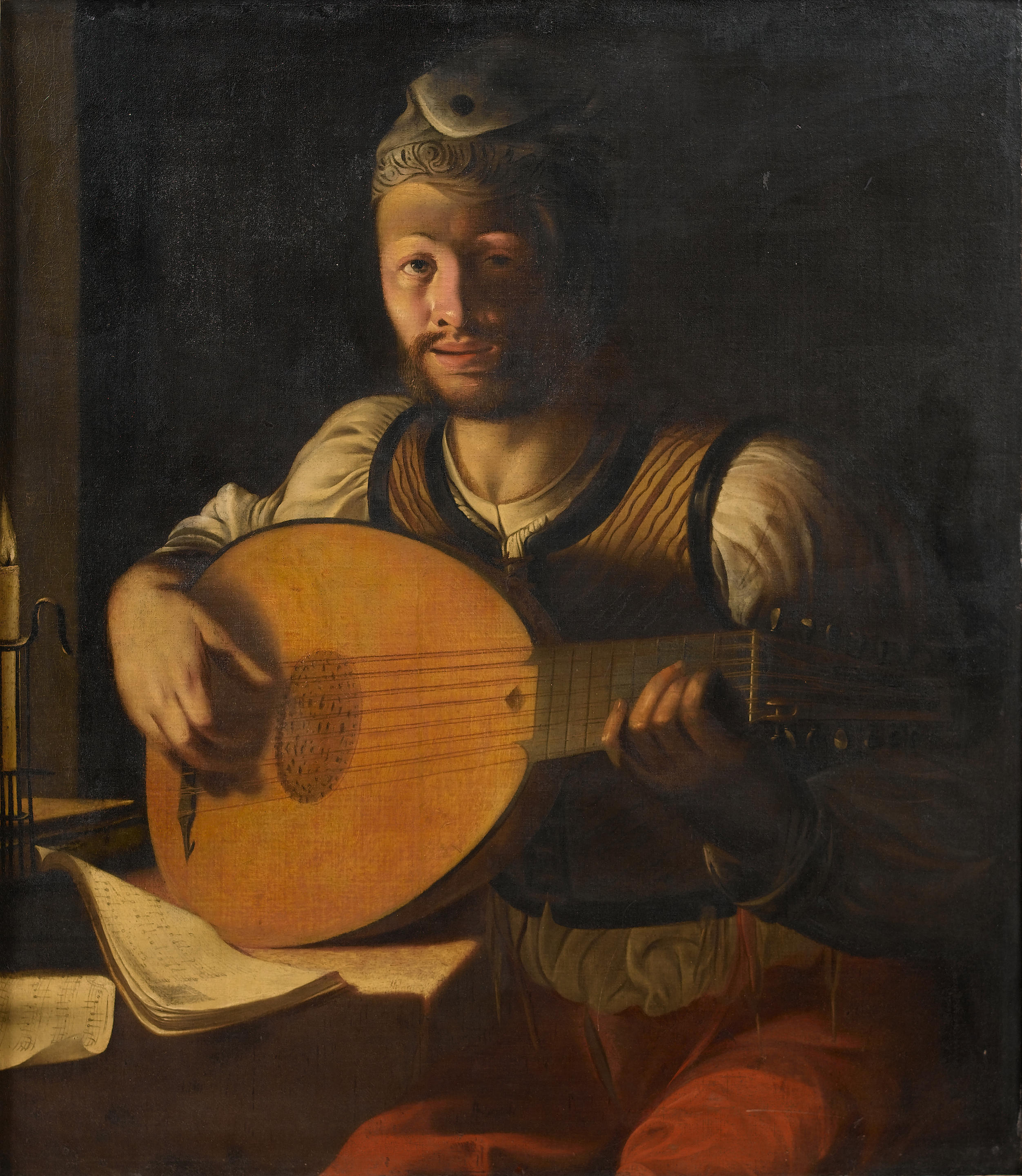
Young man playing a lute by candlelight

In 1615 Caroselli married Maria Turca or Turcha (also erroneously called 'Zurca'), whose father was a Sicilian of Palermo who had lived in Rome for many years. Passeri goes on to state that the family lived in dire straits as Caroselli did not get many commissions. For that reason the young couple left Rome in 1616, and after spending possibly some months in Piedimonte Matese in the province of Caserta, they settled in Naples. The family's single daughter and three sons Carlo, Angelo and Francesco were all born in Naples. The first born was the daughter Giacoma who was baptized in Naples on 26 September 1516. The last son was baptized in Naples on 25 February 1623. The Caresolle family moved back to Rome in 1626. Caroselli was notorious for his love for beautiful women and was often derelict in his marital duties towards his wife.

Caroselli was able to attract a number of pupils to his workshop. He shared a studio with Pietro Paolini, a painter originally from Lucca who had come to Rome to study in 1619 when he was only 16 years old. Whereas in the past the relationship between Caroselli and Paolini was regarded solely as that of a master and apprentice, more recently discovered materials point to a more complex relationship, more akin to that of collaborators and characterised by the sharing of themes. Caroselli was continuously absent from Rome from June 1616 until February 1623 so it would have been impossible for Caroselli to be Paolini's master. Paolini's documented presence in Lucca in 1626, at least for the period June–October further limits the period of their interaction. Caroselli was an important influence on the style of Paolini's work throughout his career.

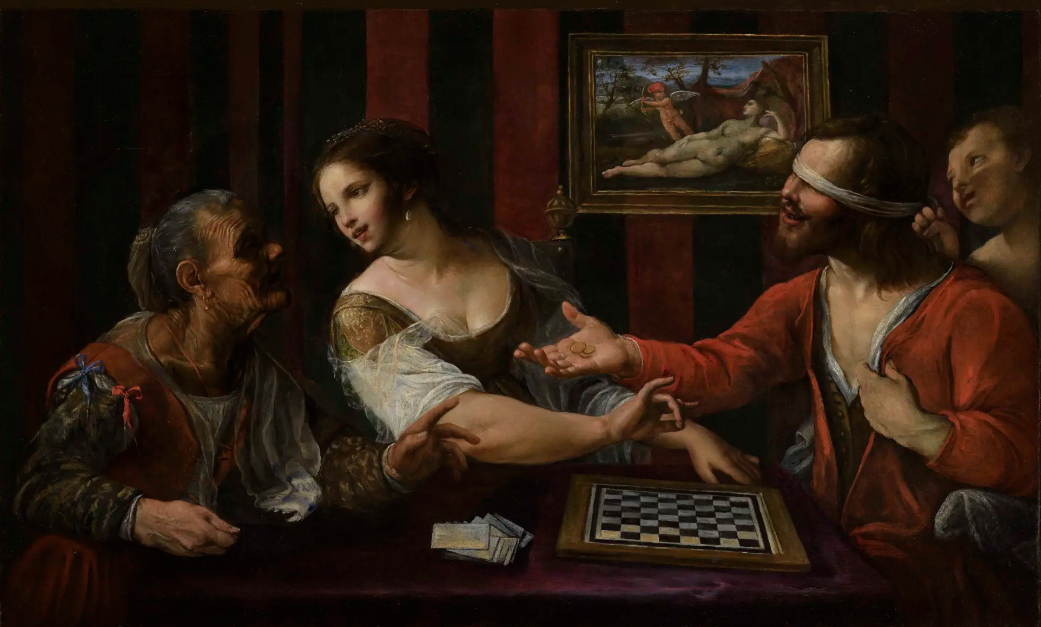
Blind love, a man playing draughts with a courtesan

In the 1630s the artist went through a turbulent time. In that decennium he received a commission from the Barberini family. He also became a friend of Cardinal Lorenzo Magalotti and made a trip to Ferrara with Guercino. In 1635 he worked on frescos in the Palazzo Pamphilj in Rome. He also formed close relationships with Prospero Fagini, Giovanni Francesco Salernitano, a nobleman from Naples, and Giovanni Luca de Franchis, an aristocrat from Genoa. After becoming a widower in 1637 he lived with the painter Agostino Tassi. He was a frequent collaborator of Tassi who used him to paint the large figures in his landscapes.

Caroselli married in 1642 Brigitta (or Brigida) Lauwers (Lauri), the daughter of the Flemish landscape painter Balthasar Lauwers who resided and worked in Rome since the early 1600s. He thus became the brother-in-law of the painters Filippo Lauri and Francesco Lauri. Filipo and Francesco became his pupils and collaborators, as evidenced by the altarpiece of 1631 representing Pope Gregory I executed for the church of S. Francesca Romana. The work, which was clearly influenced by Carlo Saraceni, was almost entirely by the hand of Francesco Lauri. Angelo's own son Carlo was his pupil but his oeuvre is not well established. Tommaso Luini (called il Caravaggino) was also one of his pupils.

After his second marriage, Caroselli's family life settled down and he became more diligent in his work. Although suffering from ill health, he continued to paint until his death in Rome on 8 April 1652.

== Work ==
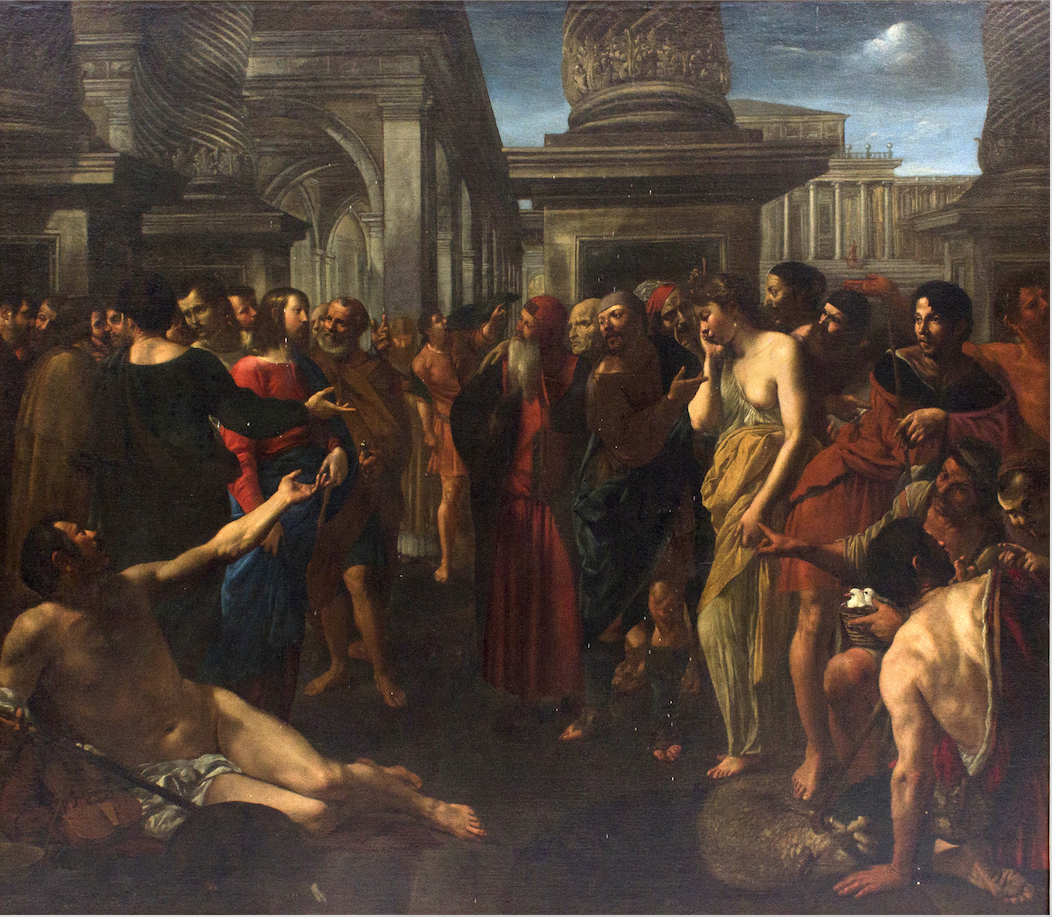
Christ and the adultress

He created religious works, allegorical paintings, portraits as well as such genre paintings with musicians and card players as were popular with the Caravaggisti. Caravaggio was an important source of inspiration in terms of his innovations in naturalism as well as subject matter. Caroselli often depicted card players, musicians, prostitutes and other low life scenes of contemporary Rome. He further showed in his oeuvre a fascination with witchcraft, necromancy and the magic arts. As the artist did not date his paintings and his work is eclectic, it is not easy to establish a clear chronology of his output both in terms of subject matter and style. Some art historians see an evolution from an initial naturalistic phase which developed in the 1930s towards a more "classicist" style, characterized by a greater elegance and softness in the brushstroke and a smoothness of the flesh that contrasts with the hard and sharp manner of the earlier works. In the latter period he also introduced ancient reliefs in his work.

The style of Caroselli is often described as eclectic. Despite his adherence to the forms and subjects of Caravaggio and the emerging Baroque, Caroselli's works show certain 'archaicising' elements. In this archaic aspect some art historians see a conscious rejection of, and rupture with, the triumphant 'Baroque absolutism' of his age. His early biographers Passeri and Baldinucci also speak at length of his great skill in copying the ancient masters and in working in different styles at the same time.

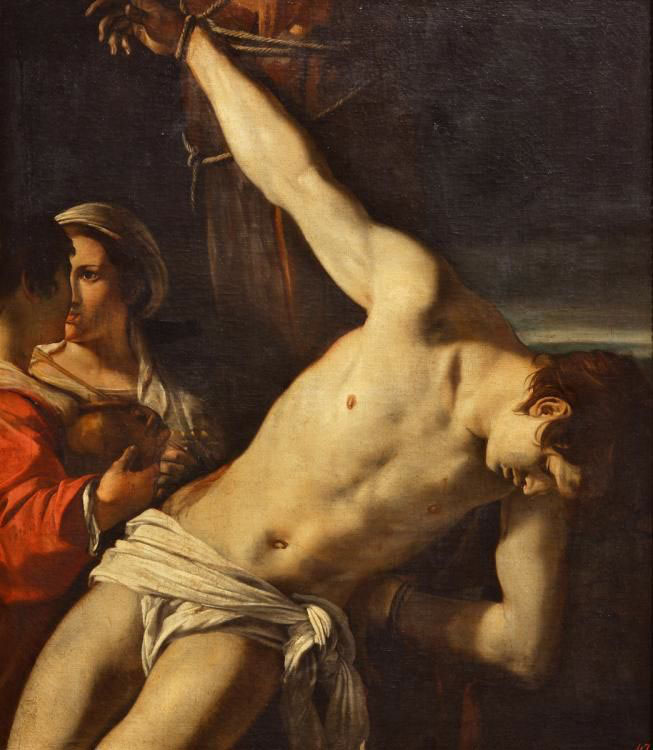
St Sebastian tended by Irene

Early interpreters of Caravaggio's style and themes such as Bartolomeo Manfredi proved an important influence on Caroselli's handling of the Caravaggist themes. Manfredi's interpretation of the singers and musical performers through half- to three-quarter-length figures in cramped, undefined rectangular spaces, imbued with rich coloration and soft chiaroscuro, seems to have left a particular impression on Caroselli. Caroselli's figures were generally less elegant and more earthly than those of Manfredi. Caroselli's depictions of singers and musicians, which likely date from his first period in Rome before 1616, appear in turn to have influenced the Dutch painter Dirck van Baburen's explorations of the same subject matter. Van Baburen's Singing young man (Städel Museum) has many elements in common with Caroselli's Singing man (Kunsthistorisches Museum) in the pose of the singer holding a score, the fanciful costume with a medallion in the hat and the raised open hand, a feature that traditionally has been associated with the Dutch followers of Caravaggio.

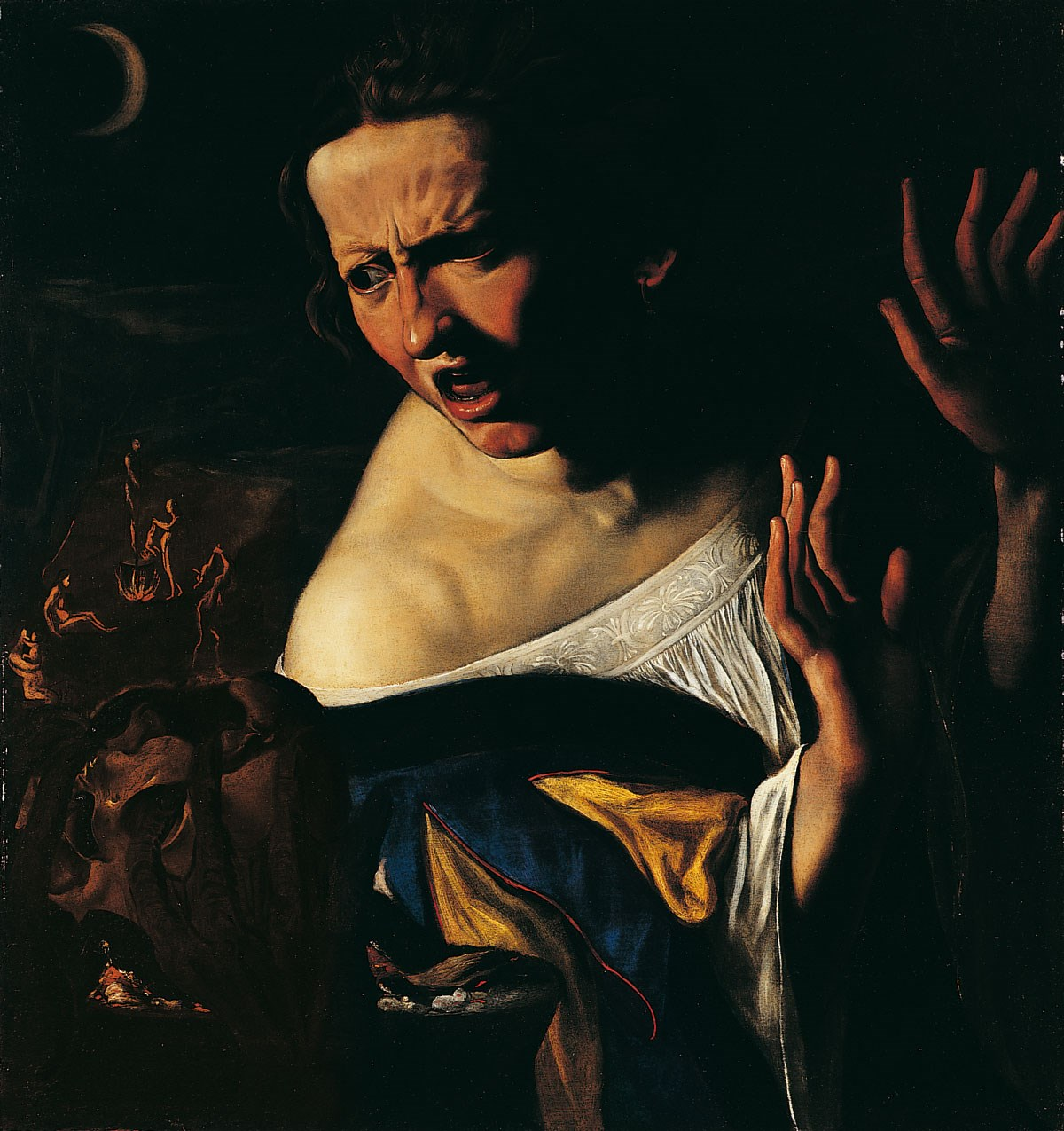
Scene of sorcery

Caroselli seems to have a preference for the subject of prostitutes and courtisans. Giovanni Battista Passeri recounts that the Caroselli lived with Agostino Tassi so he could enjoy the favours of the courtesans who lived in his house. His paintings of this subject matter therefore depict figures that the painter knew well. As his follower referred to as the Pseudo-Caroselli also often returned to this subject in a style not very unlike that of Caroselli, it has not always been possible to distinguish the work of the two artists in this area. For instance, the Violinist and Courtesan, an Allegory of Love (Sotheby's New York sale of 31 January 2018 lot 15) has traditionally been attributed to Caroselli but, since it also displays the more physical treatment of similar subjects by Pseudo-Caroselli, it could very well be the work of the latter. A fascinating depiction of the theme of paid love by Caroselli can be seen in the Blind love, a man playing draughts with a courtesan (at Robilant+Voena in 2019). This panel shows four people in a room around a table on which a draughts game board and playing cards are placed. A pretty young woman with a pearl pendant and a low-cut dress holding a game piece in her hand, is turning her head towards an old woman with a wrinkly face to her right. The latter holds something in her right hand which may be another game piece or a coin (i.e. the payment for the courtesan's services?). On the opposite side of the table there is a man blindfolded, with long dark hair and beard who is holding coins in his right hand. Behind him appears the head of a fourth figure, probably the putto who blindfolded him. On the wall hangs a painting with a nude reclining female and a Cupid with a bow and quiver in a landscape. The complex iconography of the painting seems to cite from many of the works of Caravaggio such as that of the Cardsharps, the fortune teller in the Capitoline Museums and the Calling of St. Matthew in the Contarelli Chapel in Rome. The scene has many symbolic meanings including those of gambling, deception and love. The blindfolded man in buying the courtesan's favours represents on the one hand, a form of vile, blind love and, at the same time, all those who get involved in the risky game of love. The contrast between old woman and the young courtesan placed next to each other represents an allegory of vanitas, i.e. the theme of the merciless march of life towards old age and ultimately death.

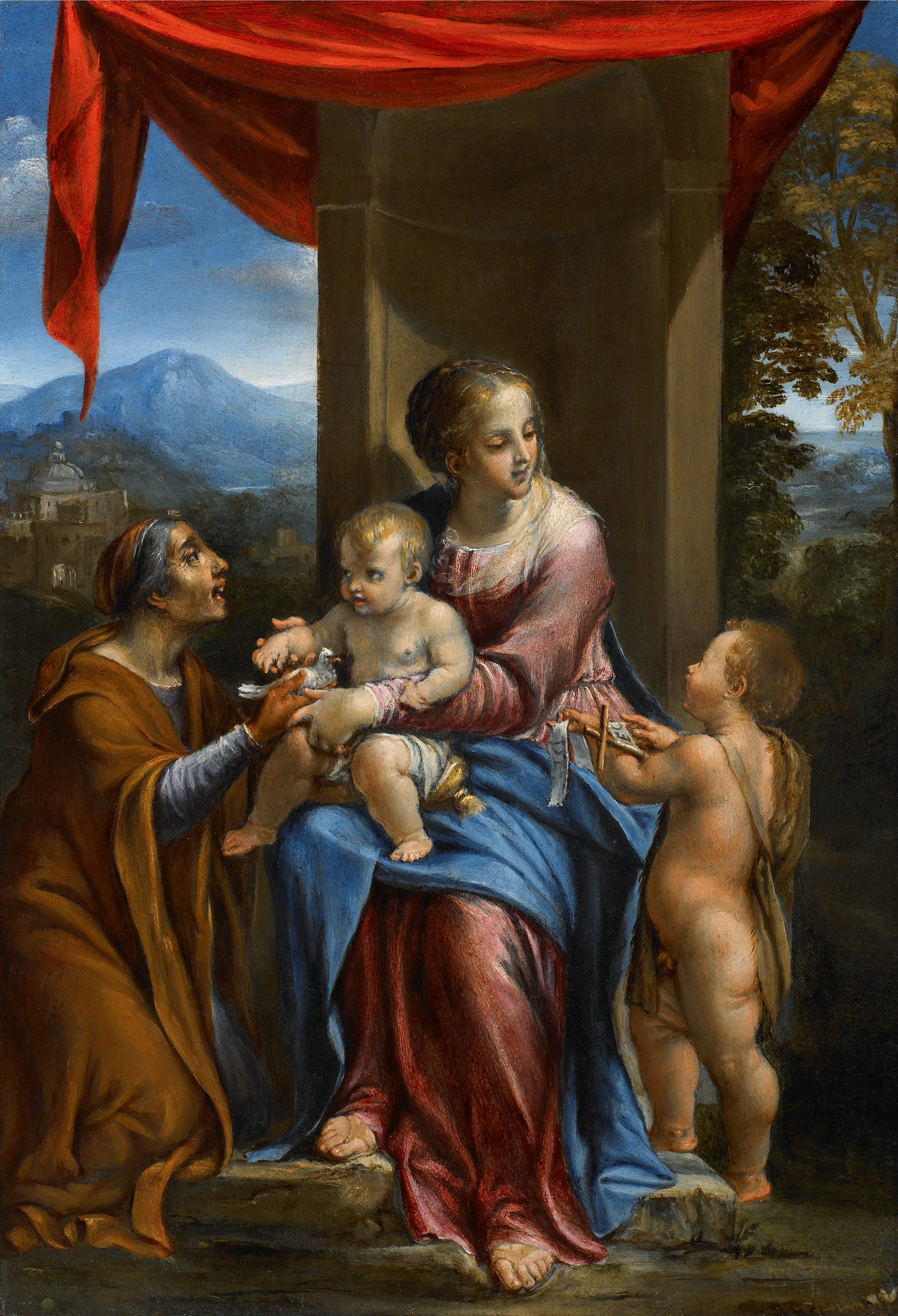
The Virgin and Child with Saints Elizabeth and the Infant John the Baptist

Various art historians have posited that Caroselli was linked to the circles of the adepts of the secret sciences of magic, occultism and alchemy. There are no written documents to support this suggestion but it is clear from his paintings dealing with themes of the occult that he had a fascination with the subject. Some of the paintings on this topic formerly attributed to him have now been attributed to the anonymous Pseudo-Caroselli.

The subject of the Virgin Mary, usually in the company of the child Jesus and saints, appears to have been particularly dear to the artist. At least 29 works treat this subject. The frequency is likely due to the Catholic Counter-Reformation's insistence on the role of the Virgin in its belief system. Most of Caroselli's Virgins are shown in a serene attitude, and, in some cases, smiling and joyful with the child Jesus. This style of representation seems to go back to ways of representing the Virgin in the 16the century and may indicate a rejection by the artist of the emotionality of the Baroque in favour of the Renaissance iconography.

== Sources ==
- Semprebene, Daniela (2011). Angelo Caroselli 1585-1652: un Pittore Irriverente. Rome: Gangemi Editore.
- Passeri, Giovanni Battista (1742). Vite de pittori, scultori ed architetti: che anno lavorato in Roma, morti dal 1641 fino al 1673. Natale Bariellini, Mercante di Libri a pasquino. pp. 188–195.
