= Balthasar Lauwers =

Flemish painter (1578–1645)

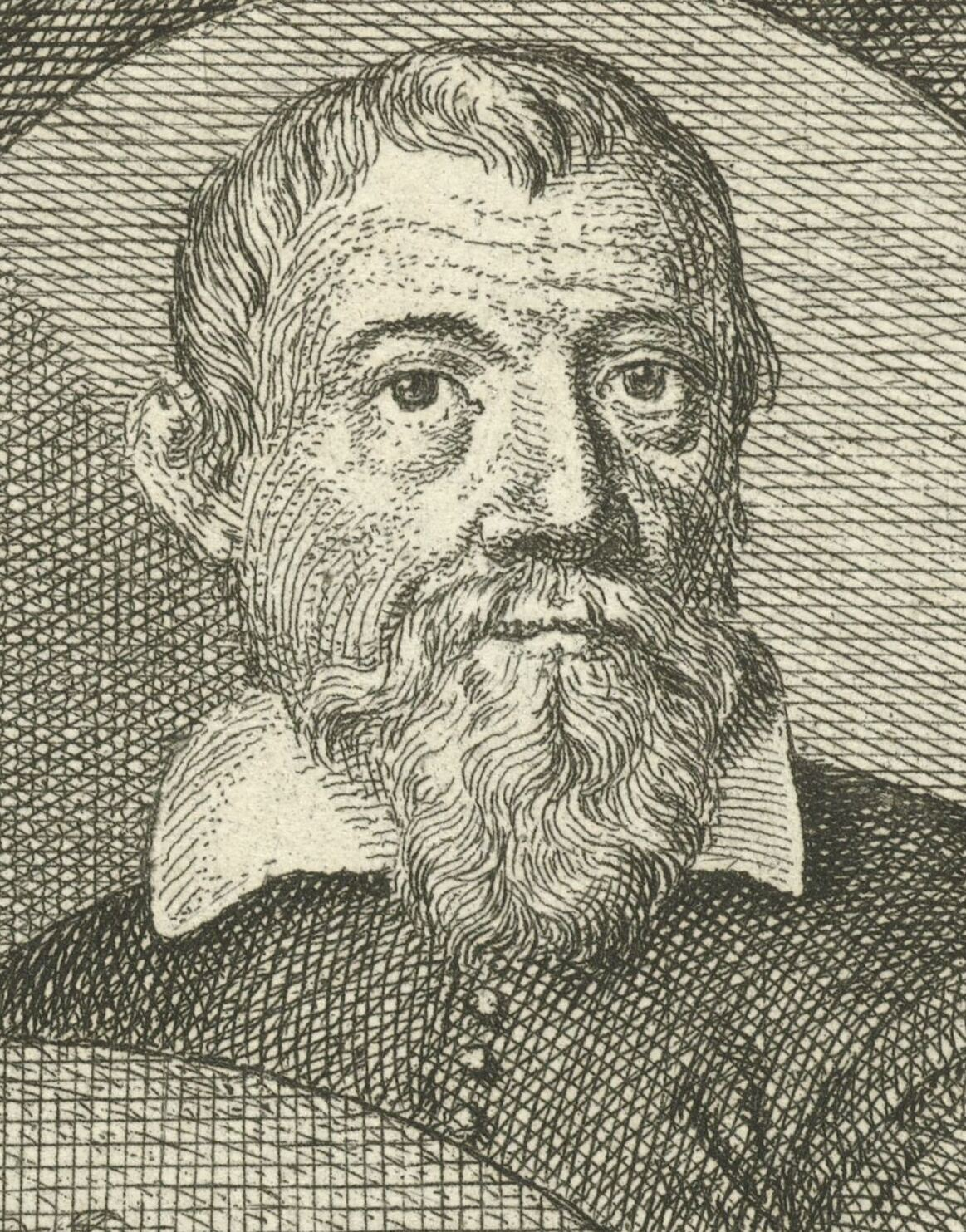
Portrait of Balthasar Lauwers by Jan l'Admiral

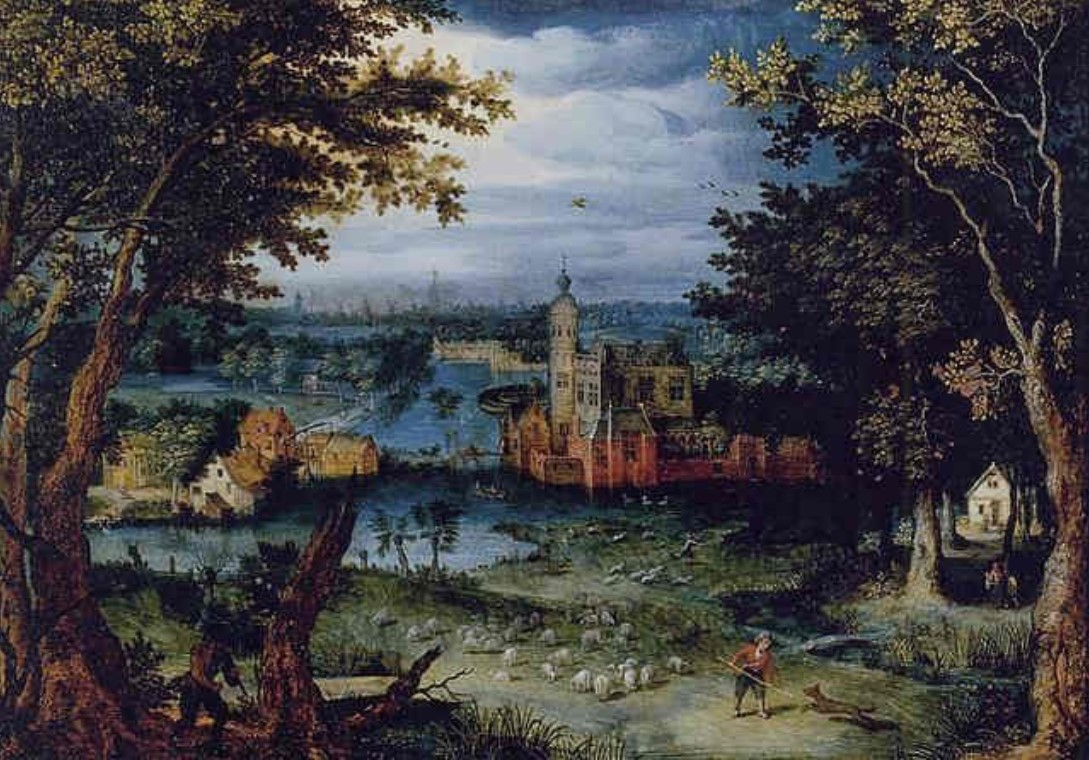
Wooded landscape with a floral garden and a castle

Balthasar Lauwers, known in Italy as Baldassare Lauri or Baldassare Lauro (baptized on 18 April 1578 – 4 August 1645) was a Flemish landscape painter who, after initially training in Antwerp, had a successful career in Italy where he worked for an elite clientele. As he was mainly active as a fresco painter in private residences, not many of his works have been preserved.

== Life ==
Balthasar Lauwers was baptized on 18 April 1578 in Antwerp. He was enrolled in 1590 under the name Balten Lauwers at the Antwerp Guild of Saint Luke as a pupil of Francoys Borsse, a painter.

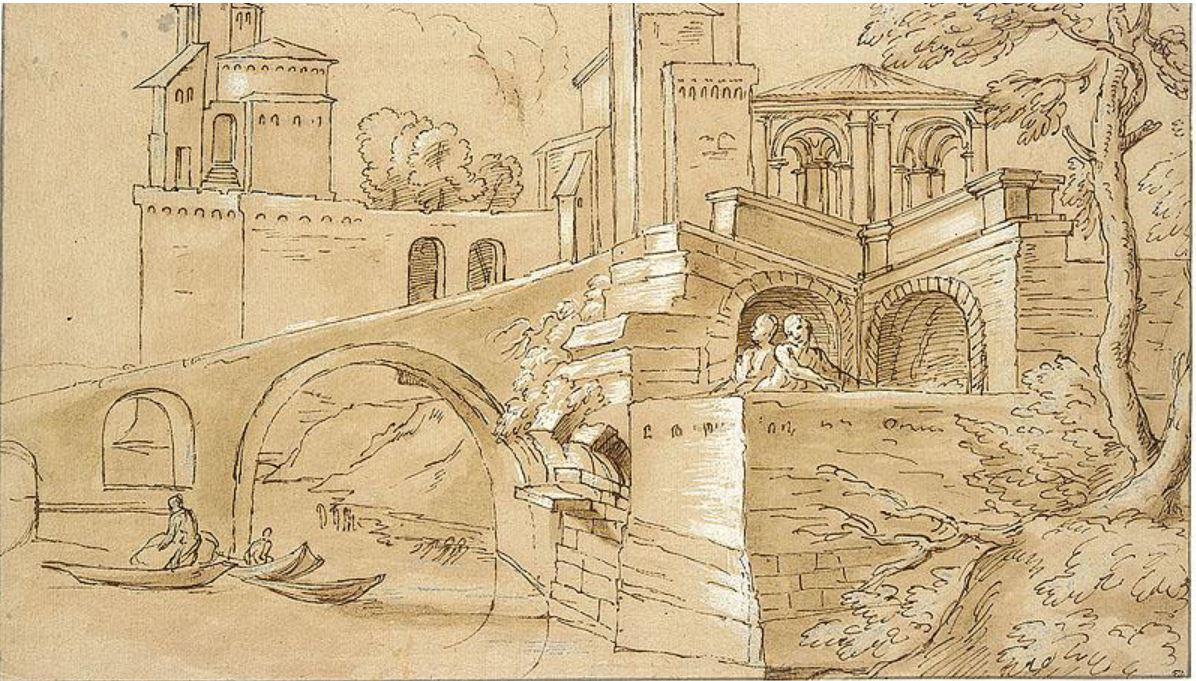
Fantasy view with the Ponte Rotto

Lauwers left Antwerp and travelled via Milan and Venice to Rome. His arrival in Italy must be placed around 1600 when he was still in his early twenties. In Rome, he was a pupil of, and later worked as an assistant to, the prominent Flemish landscape painter Paul Bril who had established himself in Rome around 1582. Thanks to Bril's connections in Rome, Lauwers was able to secure various commissions.

Prior to 1603, Balthasar Lauwers married Hélène (Elena) Cousin, daughter of Henri Cousin, a goldsmith from Paris and scion of a prominent family of French goldsmiths and artists, including two painters of the School of Fontainebleau.

In 1622 he joined the Accademia di San Luca in Rome. In 1634 Lauwers went to Milan to work on commissions. According to the early Italian art historian Filippo Baldinucci, Lauwers was invited to Milan by Cardinal Albornoz who was then the Governor of Milan. He painted in the Ducal Palace in Milan frescos of landscapes in certain porticos. Lauwers received a monthly stipend from the Cardinal as long as the Cardinal remained the governor of Milan. Lauwers returned to Rome soon where he continued to be active as a landscape painter. He made many frescos for the Sacchetti family, in particular in their palace in Ostia. He also worked for other prominent personalities of the Roman aristocracy and higher church hierarchy.

The painter Angelo Caroselli, who had become a widower, married in 1642 his daughter Brigitta Lauwers (Lauri). Lauwers trained his two sons Francesco Lauri and Filippo Lauri in the art of painting. Filippo further studied with his brother Francesco and his brother-in-law Angelo Caroselli. Aside from his sons, the architectural painter François de Nomé was also a pupil of Balthasar Lauwers.

Lauwers died on 4 August 1645 in Rome.

== Work ==
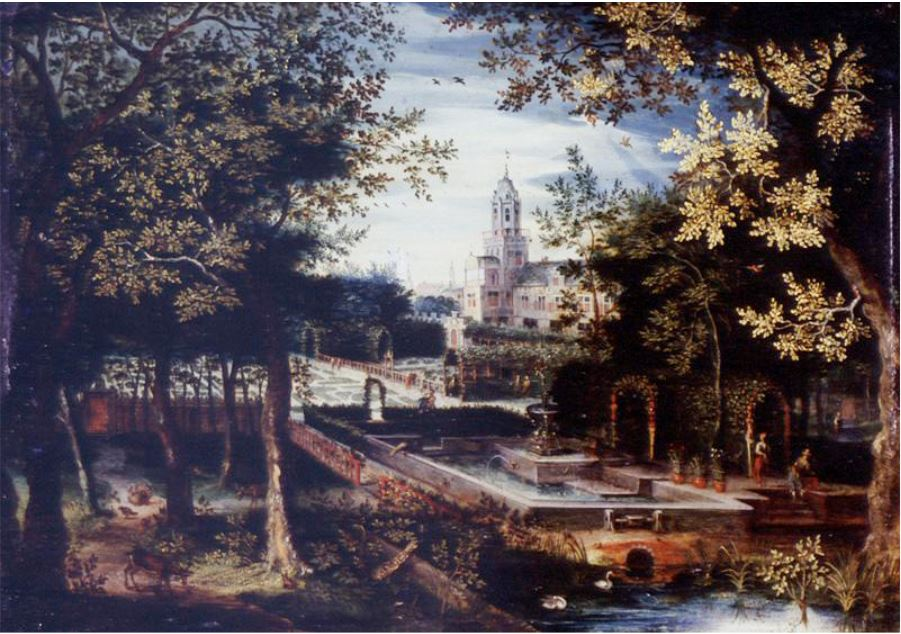
Wooded landscape with animals and huntsmen

Lauwers was principally active as a landscape painter. He worked on canvas and copper and also produced many frescos in palaces.

Lauwers is known for his landscapes depicting coastal and river landscapes populated with contemporary figures and hunting scenes. This is why he is sometimes also referred to as a marine painter. Lauwers is also described in Italian sources as a quadraturista, i.e. a painter of architectural illusions on walls to "open them up" or Italian ceiling paintings. He is known to have provided wall decorations in many palaces.

His style is regarded as close to that of Paul Bril, his master in Rome. He collaborated on decorative projects with Bril and Agostino Tassi.
