= Sorrento Cathedral =

Church building in Sorrento, Italy

Coordinates: 40.625366°N 14.373077°E

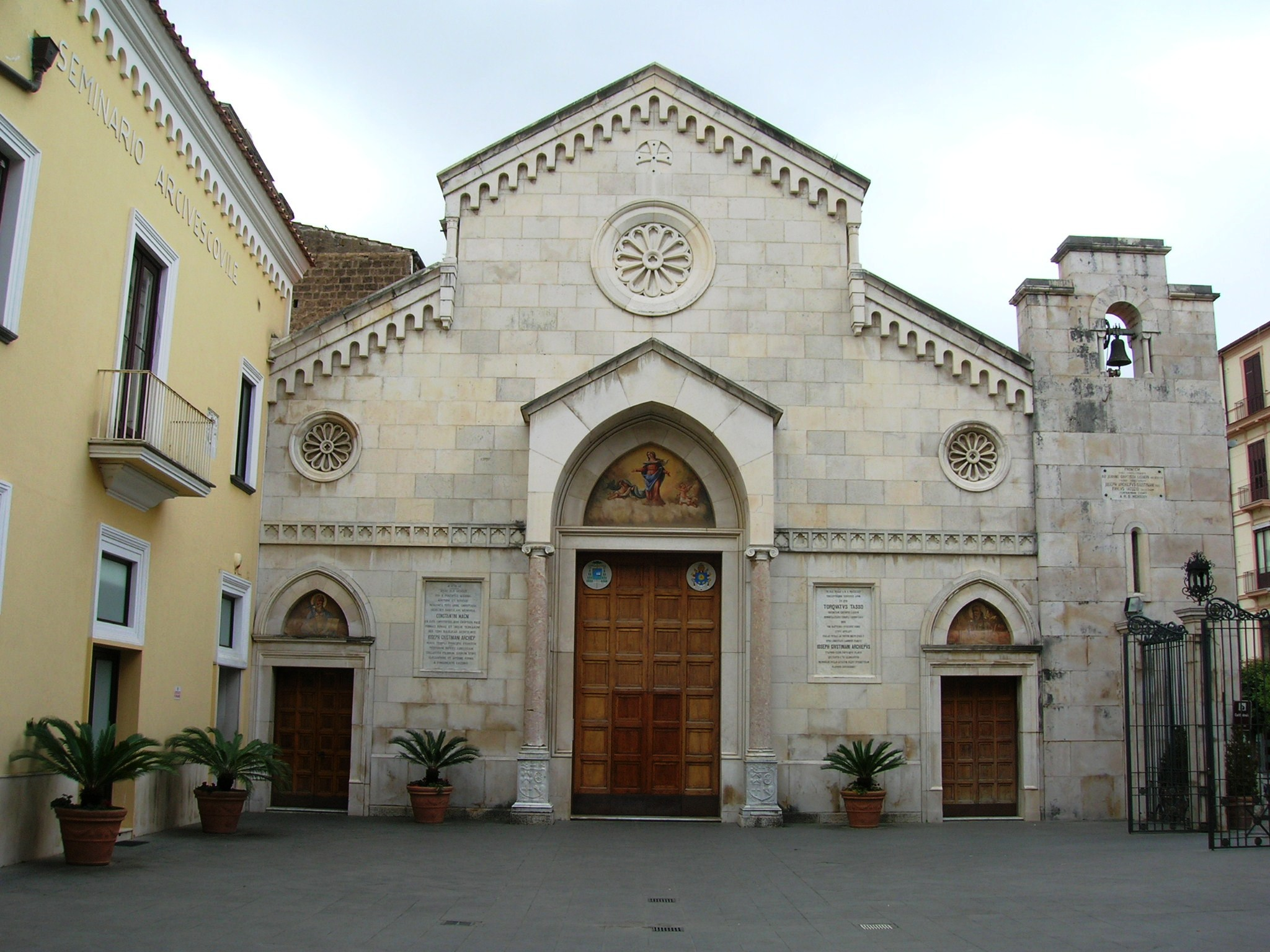
Sorrento Cathedral west front

The Cathedral of Saints Philip and James (Italian: Cattedrale dei Santi Filippo e Giacomo), commonly known as the Sorrento Cathedral (Italian: Duomo di Sorrento), is a Roman Catholic cathedral located on Via Santa Maria della Pietà in Sorrento, Italy. The cathedral is dedicated to Saints Philip the Apostle and James the Just, and has been the seat of the Archbishop of Sorrento-Castellammare di Stabia since 1986. It was previously the seat of the bishops and archbishops of Sorrento.

== History ==
It was first built around the 11th century and was rebuilt in the 15th century in Romanesque style.

The poet Torquato Tasso, the best known citizen of the town, was baptized in the church's baptistery.

== Exterior ==
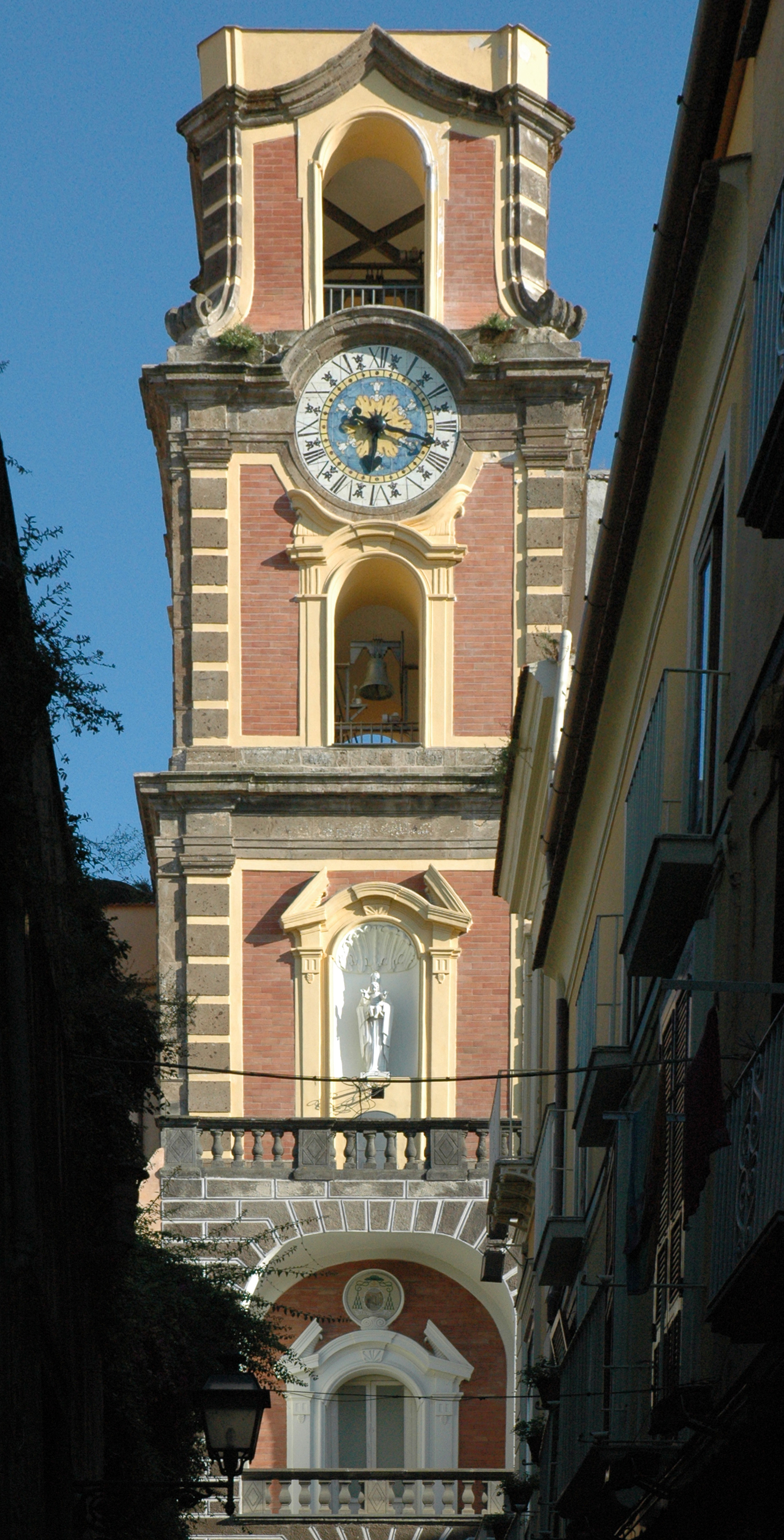
Bell tower

The cathedral bell tower has three storeys, and is decorated with a clock. The base of the bell tower dates to the time of the Roman Empire. The façade dates from 1924. The main doors are of the 11th century from Constantinople.

== Interior ==
The interior, on a Latin cross floor plan, is divided into a nave and two side aisles.

The nave contains round arches and paintings by the Nicola Malinconico, including Sorrentine Martyrs and Four Patron Bishop Saints. There are also paintings by Giacomo del Po (Assumption, St. Philip, St. James).

The marble altar and pulpit and the bishop's throne all date from the 16th century.
