= Andrea Sacchi =

Italian painter

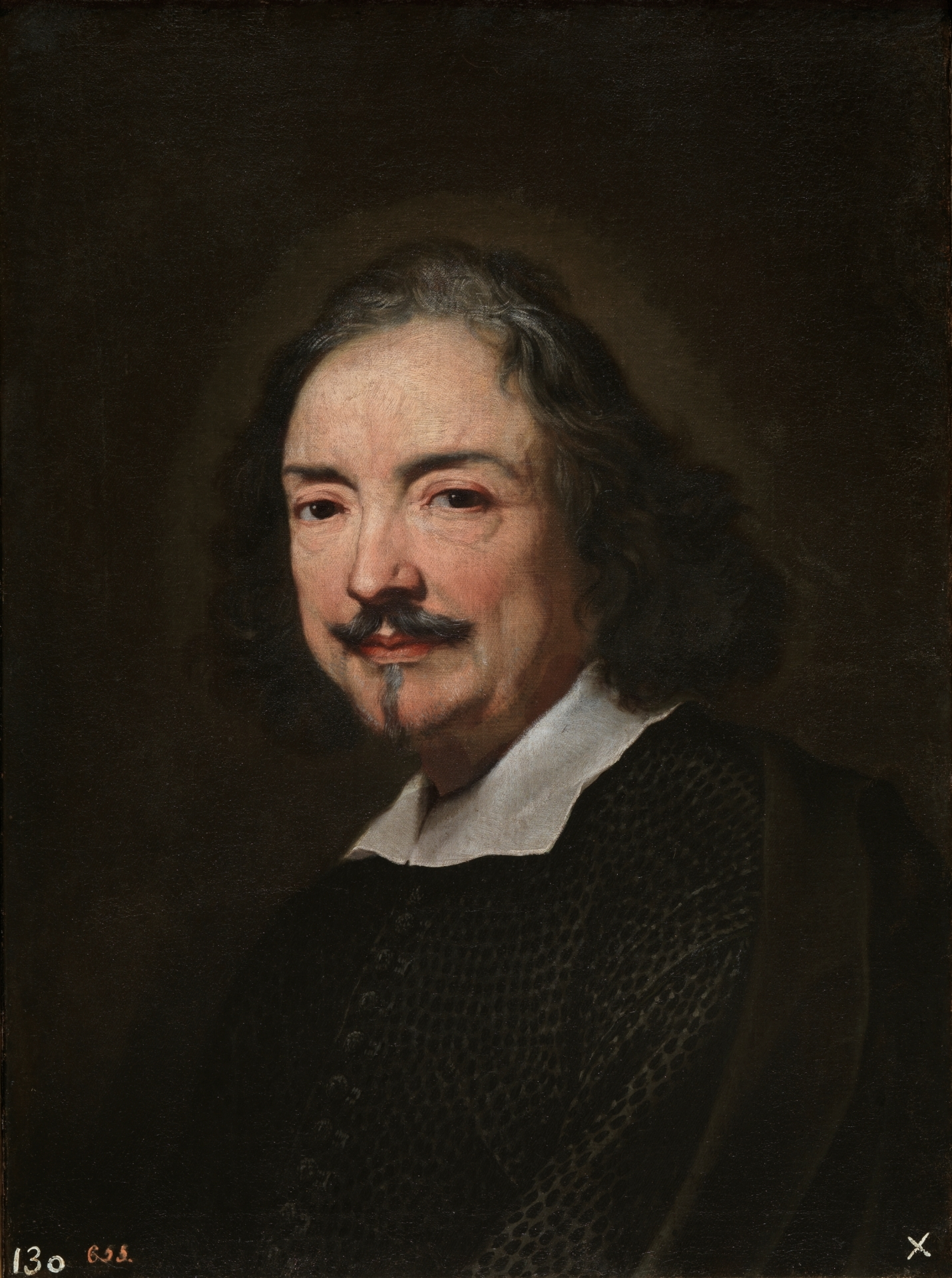
- Portrait of Andrea Sacchi by Maratta, c. 1661, Museo del Prado, Madrid.
- Born: 30 November 1599; Rome, Papal States
- Died: 21 June 1661 (aged 61); Rome, Papal States
- Education: Giuseppe Cesari; Francesco Albani
- Known for: Painting
- Movement: Baroque
- Patrons: Francesco Maria del Monte

Andrea Sacchi (30 November 1599 – 21 June 1661) was an Italian painter of High Baroque Classicism, active in Rome. A contemporary rival of Pietro da Cortona, Sacchi studied the paintings of Raphael, and the influence of Raphael is apparent in a number of his works, particularly with reference to the use of few figures and their expressions. A generation of artists who shared his style of art include the painters Nicolas Poussin and Giovanni Battista Passeri, the sculptors Alessandro Algardi and François Duquesnoy, and the contemporary biographer Giovanni Bellori.

== Life and work ==
=== Early training ===
Sacchi was, for a long time, believed to have been born in Nettuno, a coastal town close to Rome, although current scholarship regards this as incorrect, instead suggesting that he was born in Rome. (Note: This view emerged following many academic studies such as those by Ann Sutherland Harris. As far as Andrea Sacchi's birth in Rome and not in Nettuno is concerned, see Ann Sutherland Harris, "Andrea Sacchi", L'idea del bello: viaggio per Roma nel Seicento con Giovan Pietro Bellori, exh. cat. edited by E. Borea and C. Gasparri, Rome (Palazzo delle Esposizioni), Roma: De Luca, 2000, vol. II, 2 vols., p.442-444. Sacchi's death in Rome is proven by his will, now at the State Archives in Rome. The will has been transcribed and may be found in Antonio D'Avossa, Andrea Sacchi, Roma: Kappa, 1985.) His father, Nicola Pellegrino, came from Fermo, but Andrea was apparently adopted by his first teacher, an undistinguished painter named Benedetto Sacchi. According to the biographer Giovanni Pietro Bellori (who was also a great friend of Sacchi's), Andrea initially entered the studio of Cavalier d'Arpino. These are Bellori's words:

[...] hence Benedetto, his father, as soon as he saw that he was being outstripped by his son in his childhood, no longer having the courage to educate him, wisely thought to provide him with a better master and recommended him to Cavalier Giuseppe d’Arpino, who gladly took him into his school, perceiving him to be more attentive and bent on progress than any other youth.

Sacchi later entered Francesco Albani's workshop and studied for a period with Albani in Bologna, perhaps in 1618 when the latter returned there from Rome. Under Albani's influence, Sacchi adopted a classical, restrained style characterized by clear composition, balanced forms, and harmonious colors. Sacchi remained loyal to Albani's teachings throughout his entire life. Before leaving his workshop he painted a portrait of his master and conserved it until his own death (1635; Prado Museum, Madrid). Sacchi’s talents were recognized by Cardinal Francesco Maria del Monte, the patron of Caravaggio, who employed him almost exclusively from about 1620 until his own death in 1626. Sacchi’s early public commissions in Rome for del Monte have long been believed lost. However, a major discovery and a subsequent restoration in 2010–2011 revealed that the elaborate fresco cycle realized by Sacchi for the loggia of Cardinal del Monte's Palazzo di Ripetta in Rome, survived intact.

Nativity of John the Baptist, 1628–1629, Museo del Prado, Madrid

Sacchi’s next surviving work is the Vision of Saint Isidore, commissioned in 1622 for the high altar of Sant'Isidoro a Capo le Case. Sacchi owed his first commission in St. Peter's Basilica, his altarpiece of Saint Gregory and the Miracle of the Corporal (1625–6; Rome, St. Peter’s), to del Monte’s influence. The canvas portrays the legend that the Empress Constantia had begged Pope Gregory I to give her relics of the body of Saints Peter and Paul, but the pope, not daring to disturb the remains of these saints, sent her a fragment of the linen which had enveloped the remains of Saint John the Evangelist. Constantia rejected this gift from the pope as insufficient. Then Gregory, to prove the power of relics to work miracles (and justify their worth), placed the cloth on the altar and, after praying, pierced it with a knife, and blood flowed from it as from a living body. In 1771, a mosaic copy of this painting was made for the Basilica of St Peter's. This painting echoes positions stated in the canons of the Council of Trent: wherein relics had an important role in miracles, the pope served as the final interpreter of sanctity, and finally it was a metaphor of the validity of the eucharist as the true body of Christ.

Between 1628 and 1629, Sacchi painted The Birth of Saint John the Baptist (Museo del Prado, Madrid). Sacchi portrays the infant John the Baptist attended to by four women, while Zechariah thanks the heavens for the birth of his son. The painting is notable for its strong classical approach, influenced by Raphael and the Carracci, and for its intense colour palette. All of the artist’s early paintings glow with the saturated reds and rich lapis blues that he admired in the work of Federico Barocci; they express a fervent religious sentiment closer to that of Barocci and of Ludovico Carracci than to the controlled rhetoric of Annibale Carracci’s late works and those of Domenichino and Francesco Albani.

The exposure Sacchi gained from del Monte’s patronage soon led to his employment by the Barberini family and their circle. In 1628 Sacchi assisted Pietro da Cortona with the decoration of the ceiling of the upper gallery in the Villa Sacchetti at Castelfusano near Rome. Sacchi executed the central composition and several other scenes to his own designs.

=== Mature work, 1629–53 ===
Allegory of Divine Wisdom, 1629–31, Palazzo Barberini, Rome

In 1629 Sacchi began an important ceiling fresco in the Palazzo Barberini, Rome, the Allegory of Divine Wisdom (finished 1631), which is considered his masterpiece. The fresco was inspired by Raphael's Parnasus in the Raphael's Rooms in the Vatican Palace. It was intended to create the illusion that the ceiling of the room has been replaced by open sky in which a miraculous vision hovers. Eleven women representing various attributes of Holy Wisdom rest in the clouds surrounding her enthroned figure. It illustrates an apocryphal text, Book of Wisdom (chaps 7 and 8).

Each woman is carefully individualized by facial characteristics, hair colour and proportions as well as by her pose, costume and attributes. The figures are grouped so that the spectator’s eye is led easily from left to right in a gentle clockwise motion across the ceiling and down to the globe of the world ruled by Holy Wisdom. The gold stars on the attributes held by each figure indicate that they are also constellations: Nobility has the crown of Ariadne, Eternity a snake, Justice scales, Fortitude Hercules' club, Sweetness a lyre, Divinity a triangle, Beneficence an ear of corn and breasts full of milk, Holiness an altar, Purity a swan, Perspicacity an eagle and Beauty the locks of Berenice. The reference intended is to Book of Wisdom 7:29:

For she [Wisdom] is more beautiful than the sun, and above all the order of the stars.

The use of these attributes caused some confusion among 17th-century writers, since some of the constellations were more usually associated with other personifications. The ceiling is certainly not, as has often been asserted, conceived as a quadro riportato, for the throne of Holy Wisdom is seen from below, as are the cloud banks and the figures. This misreading has been influenced by the desire to make Sacchi’s ceiling serve as a classical counterpart to Pietro da Cortona’s vast Baroque Allegory of Divine Providence and Barberini Power (1632–9) near by in the Gran Salone of the palace. It disregards the different functions of the two rooms and the fact that Sacchi’s ceiling was completed before Cortona’s was begun. Sacchi’s was for its date firmly in the illusionistic avant-garde pioneered in Rome by Giovanni Lanfranco’s ceiling, the Gods of Olympus, in the Villa Borghese (1624–5). Cortona’s ceiling is in the room that was used for public functions and its purpose was essentially to glorify the Barberini family in sumptuous allegorical visual language. According to the American art historian Joseph Connors:

Urban VIII's personal emblem is the rising sun [and a] visitor to the palace would have seen the sun of Divine Wisdom and the constellation of the lion (as well as in the throne) in Sacchi's fresco... the eye [can] take in the fresco but also to penetrate beyond to the chapel next door. From the right point of view the sun of Divine Wisdom looks as though it is hovering over the dome of the chapel, "radiating downward its beneficent light". ... Scott's astrological interpretation ... is convincing because it is also a political interpretation. Because of the favorable conjunction of the stars at two key moments, Urban VIII's birth and election, the Barberini were "born and elected to rule." Campanella could have told the pope that when he was elected the sun had entered into the Great Conjunction with Jupiter (whose eagle is shown by Sacchi in conjunction with the sun and the lion). Urban VIII's nephew Taddeo Barberini, the patron of this wing of the palace and the relative on whom the family pinned its hopes for offspring and immortality, had a natal chart similar to his uncle's, and by coincidence so did the child born to him during his residence in the palace. The little chapel adjacent to Sacchi's fresco was designed for the baptism of such children, and its frescoes carried all the usual talismans of fertility. The stars could be expected to look favorably on a family "born and elected to rule" down the generations.

Vision of Saint Romuald, oil on canvas, 1631, Pinacoteca Vaticana, Rome

Sacchi’s fresco was evidently a success with the papal family, for by 1633 he was receiving regular commissions and financial support from Cardinal Antonio Barberini, who remained a loyal patron. His most famous altarpiece, however, the Vision of Saint Romuald (1631; Rome, Pinacoteca Vaticana), was painted for a relatively obscure patron, Cardinal Lelio Biscia, Vice-Protector of the Camaldolese Order, who commissioned it for the high altar of the Order’s new church in Rome, San Romualdo. this painting in the Pinacoteca Vaticana recalls an episode in the life of the early Benedictine monk, Romuald, of the founder of the Monastery of Camaldoli, who is reported to have dreamt that members of his Order wearing white ascended into heaven. The painting shows a group of Camaldolese monks in white woollen robes seated in the shade of a large tree listening to the saint describing his vision, which is depicted behind them. The serenity and gravity of the monks, arrayed as in philosophic discourse, are characteristic of Sacchi. The composition with the sloping form of the tree buttressing the main figures was a device adopted later by Pier Francesco Mola and other artists. Sacchi’s skill at characterizing the various monks, deep in meditation, and his control of the limited range of colour and tone required by the subject were much admired.

Sacchi was not comfortable in the role of a decorator and believed with Poussin that the purpose of art was to convey serious moral thought rather than to dazzle and to entertain. His artistic philosophy is epitomized by the Saint Romuald altarpiece and by the Allegory of Divine Wisdom. The text illustrated by the fresco mentions many more attributes of Wisdom than those selected by the artist (probably in consultation with a learned adviser), but it was entirely in character for Sacchi to have reduced his cast of characters to the minimum. In later works he arranged his compositions so that the principal figures are instantly recognized by the viewer, and the watching crowd is disposed so that few are seen fully, with the most prominent spectators screening others whose presence is hinted at by a hand or half-seen face, as in Saint Anthony Raising a Man from the Dead (1632–3; Rome, Santa Maria della Concezione dei Cappuccini).

Between 1635 and 1636, Sacchi undertook an extensive trip to northern Italy. This journey, which took place between his major commissions for the Church of Santa Maria della Concezione in Rome, had a profound impact on his artistic style. He visited Bologna, Parma, and Venice, where he absorbed the rich, atmospheric colour palette characteristic of the Venetian school and studied Correggio's painting techniques. This northern Italian experience led Sacchi to refine his approach to lighting and tones, culminating in what the contemporary Bellori later defined as his signature "colore temperato" (tempered colour).

=== Debate with Pietro da Cortona ===
Sacchi’s celebrated debate with Pietro da Cortona at the Accademia di San Luca, the guild for artists in Rome was probably held in 1636. During the debate, Sacchi strongly criticized Cortona for his crowded, hyper-dynamic compositions, arguing that a painting should follow the principles of classical clarity and simplicity. The debate is significant because it indicates how two of the leading proponents of the prevailing styles in painting, now called 'Classical' and 'Baroque', discussed the differences between their work.

In particular, Sacchi advocated that since a unique, individual expression, gesture and movement needed to be assigned to each figure in a composition, a painting should only have a few figures. In a crowded composition, the figures would be deprived of individuality, and thus cloud the particular meaning of the piece. In some ways this was a reaction against the zealous excess of crowds in paintings by artists such as Zuccari in the previous generation, and by Cortona among his contemporaries. Simplicity and unity were essential to Sacchi, who, drawing an analogy to poetry, likened painting to classical tragedy. In his counter-argument, Cortona made the case that large paintings with many figures were like an epic which could develop multiple sub-themes. But for Sacchi, the encrustation of a painting with excess decorative details, including melees of crowds, would represent something akin to 'wall-paper' art rather than focused narrative. Among the partisans of Sacchi's argument for simplicity and focus were his friends, the sculptor Algardi and painter Poussin. The controversy was, however, less pitched and monolithic than some might suggest. In fact, Poussin's biographer Bellori recounts that the artist 'used to laugh at those who contract for a [history painting] with six or eight figures or some other fixed number.' Sacchi and Albani, among others, shared dissatisfaction with the artistic depiction of low or genre subjects and themes, such as those preferred by the Bamboccianti and even the Caravaggisti. They felt that high art should focus on exalted themes – biblical, mythological, or from classical ancient history.

=== Later career ===
Andrea Sacchi, Filippo Gagliardi and Jan Miel, Urban VIII Visiting Il Gesù during the Centenary Celebrations of the Jesuit Order, oil on canvas, 1641–2, Palazzo Barberini, Rome

Ironically, in the 1640s Sacchi received several commissions for compositions that required large crowds: these, however, he frequently delegated to other painters. In 1639 he was commissioned to decorate the Lateran baptistery of San Giovanni in Fonte, the legendary site of the baptism of Constantine the Great. The large wall frescoes, recounting the story of Constantine, were carried out by other artists, although Sacchi designed the Destruction of Pagan Writings at the Nicene Council and Constantine Ordering the Destruction of Pagan Idols, which were executed by Carlo Magnone (1620–1653) and Carlo Maratta. Meanwhile Sacchi himself prepared for the lantern above the font his cycle of eight paintings of the Life of the Baptist (Rome, Lateran Palace), which are distinguished by the warmth and brightness of the colour and the simplicity and clarity of the compositions. None features more than ten figures; even the crowd scene of John the Baptist preaching is reduced to seven. In 1641 Sacchi planned a vast canvas, Urban VIII Visiting the Gesù during the Centenary Celebrations of the Jesuit Order, to commemorate these celebrations. This shows, at the centre, the Pope and several eminent members of the Barberini family and a substantial crowd of spectators and clergy. Yet here too Sacchi employed other artists: Filippo Gagliardi for the architecture and the smaller crowd figures in the background, Jan Miel for the genre figures in the foreground. A Barberini inventory of 1672 specifies that Sacchi painted the central group of the Pope and his entourage and the Jesuits being presented to them; drawings suggest that Sacchi also planned the figures by Miel, some of which appear on a sheet of red chalk studies (Cambridge, Fitzwilliam Museum).

Although Sacchi’s best-known and most influential works were produced in the 1630s, he continued to create original interpretations of common and unusual subjects until his death. His treatment of the Drunkenness of Noah, which exists in many versions (e.g. Berlin, Bode Museum, and Catanzaro, Museo Provinciale), contrasts the sprawled, sleeping form of Noah with the standing, mocking figure of Ham, who gestures towards his father while looking out of the picture. Behind them, Ham’s brothers back up to their father holding a large cloak, with which to cover him. A grape arbour adorns the left edge of the canvas and bunches of grapes rest on the rocky ledge where Noah sleeps, his slack right hand barely holding a metal drinking saucer. Every element in the design has been carefully planned to contribute to the final effect: from the shadow that partly obscures Noah’s face to the contour lines of the cloak and the hills beyond. The brightness of the painting and the classical proportions of the figures are reminiscent of Antonio da Correggio.

Sacchi’s finest late altarpiece is the Death of Saint Anne (1648–9; Rome, San Carlo ai Catinari), the only one of his public commissions from the 1640s and 1650s still in good condition. His frescoed high altarpiece, the Dream of Saint Joseph (1652), for San Giuseppe a Capo le Case, his last public commission in Rome, is largely repainted. The many striking parallels between Sacchi’s Death of Saint Anne and Caravaggio’s Death of the Virgin (1601–1602/3; Paris, Louvre) prove that Sacchi must have been aware of the latter’s design, even if he can hardly have known the original (it left Rome in 1607, when Sacchi was a child). Sacchi’s painting can be read as a critical reinterpretation of Caravaggio’s controversial picture, with more dignified figures and less openly expressed emotional reactions. The rich impasto surface and warm colours contrast vividly with the badly abraded surfaces of Sacchi’s other late canvases.

Sacchi died at Nettuno on 21 June 1661, aged 61. Sacchi, who worked almost always in Rome, left few pictures visible in private galleries. He had a flourishing school: Carlo Maratta was a younger collaborator or pupil. In Maratta's large studio, Sacchi's preference for a grand manner style would find pre-eminence among Roman circles for decades to follow. But many others worked under him or his influence including Francesco Fiorelli, Luigi Garzi, Francesco Lauri, Andrea Camassei, Agostino Scilla, and Giacinto Gimignani. Sacchi's own illegitimate son Giuseppe, died young after high hopes for his future.

== Gallery ==
=== Paintings ===
Recently rediscovered fresco by Andreea Sacchi for the Roman loggia of Cardinal del Monte in Rome, 1617

The Baptism of Christ, 1620s, Fitzwilliam Museum, Cambridge

Saints Anthony Abbot and Francis of Assisi, 1622-1626, National Gallery, London

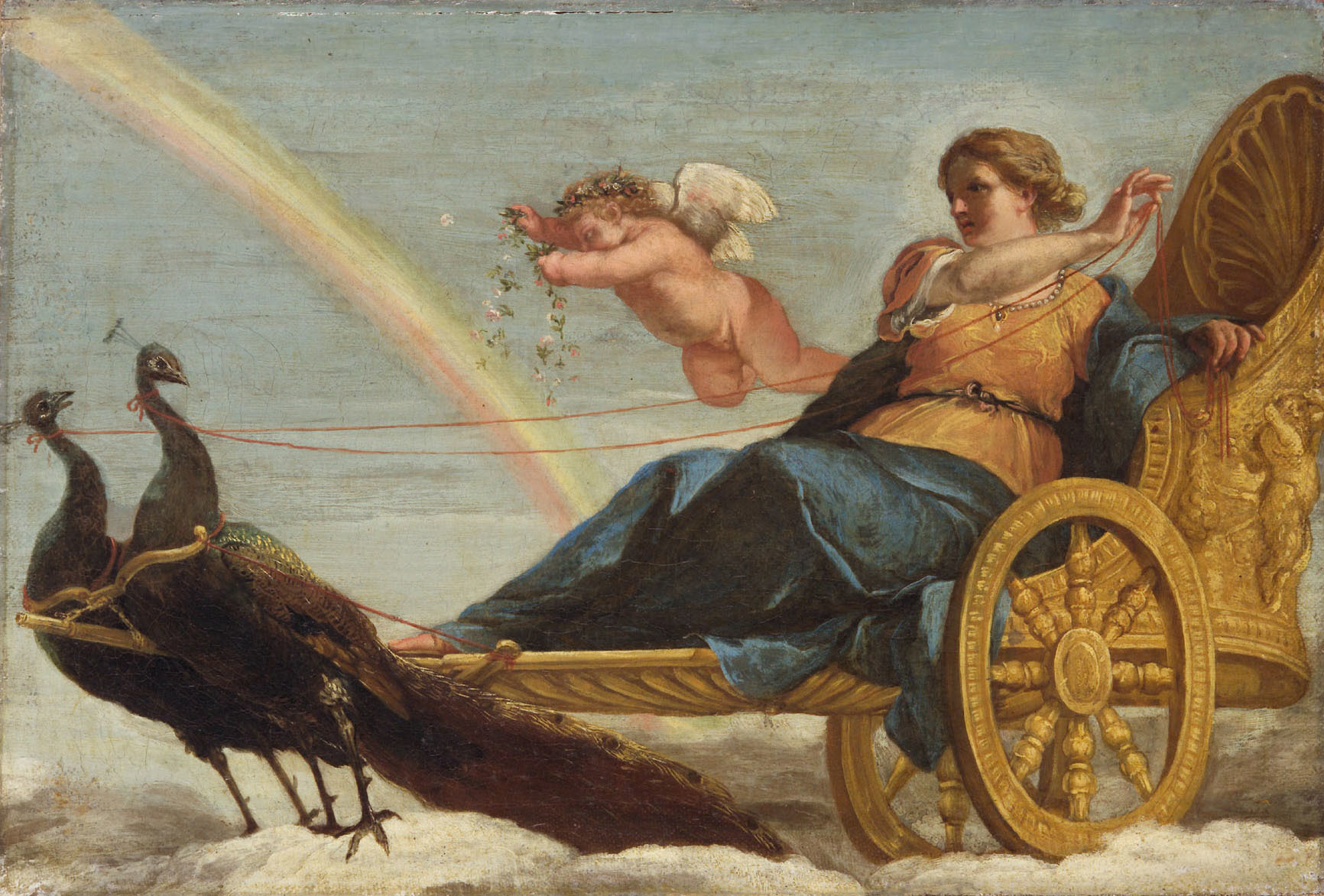
Juno in a Chariot Pulled by Peacocks, c. 1625, Kunsthistorisches Museum, Vienna

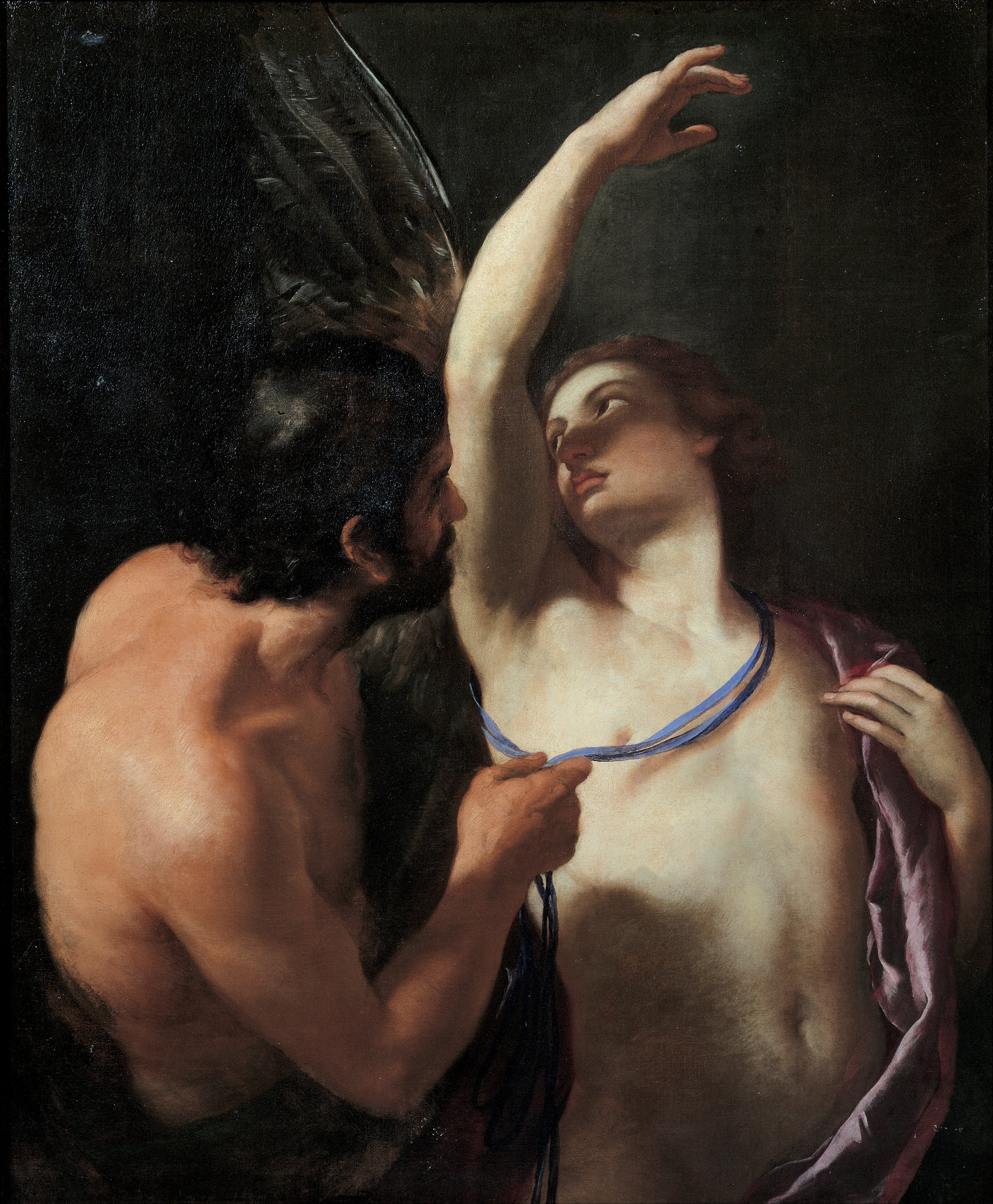
Daedalus and Icarus, c. 1645, Musei di Strada Nuova, Genoa

Hagar and Ishmael in the Wilderness, National Museum Cardiff

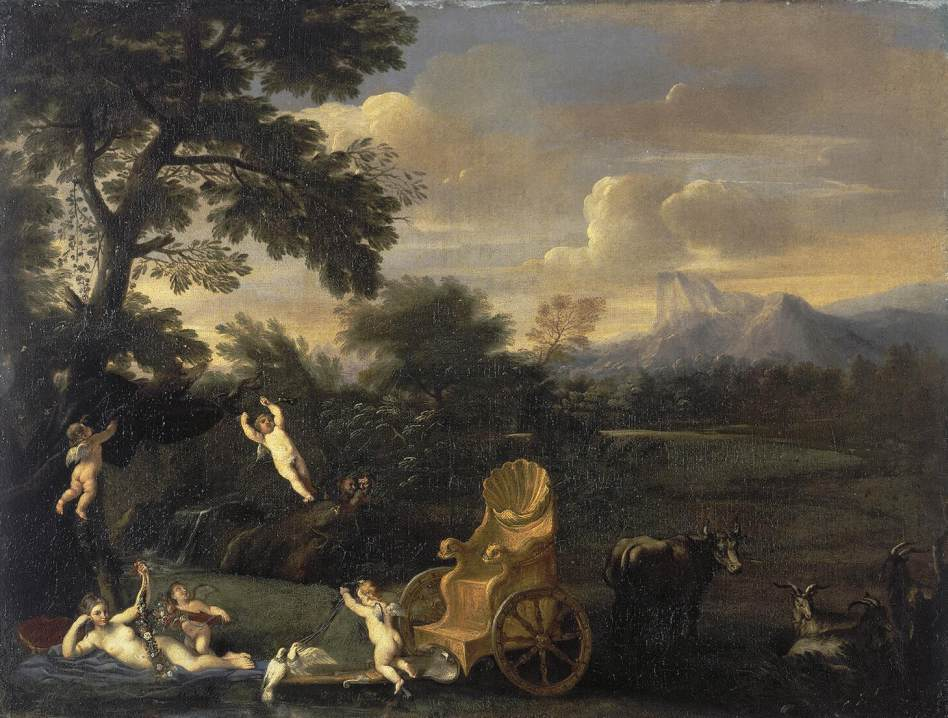
Venus at Rest, Hermitage Museum, Saint Petersburg

=== Drawings ===
Portrait of Francesco Albani, Metropolitan Museum of Art, New York

A Sacrifice to Pan, early 1630s, National Gallery of Art, Washington, D.C.

Portrait of Cardinal Antonio Barberini the Younger, Metropolitan Museum of Art, New York

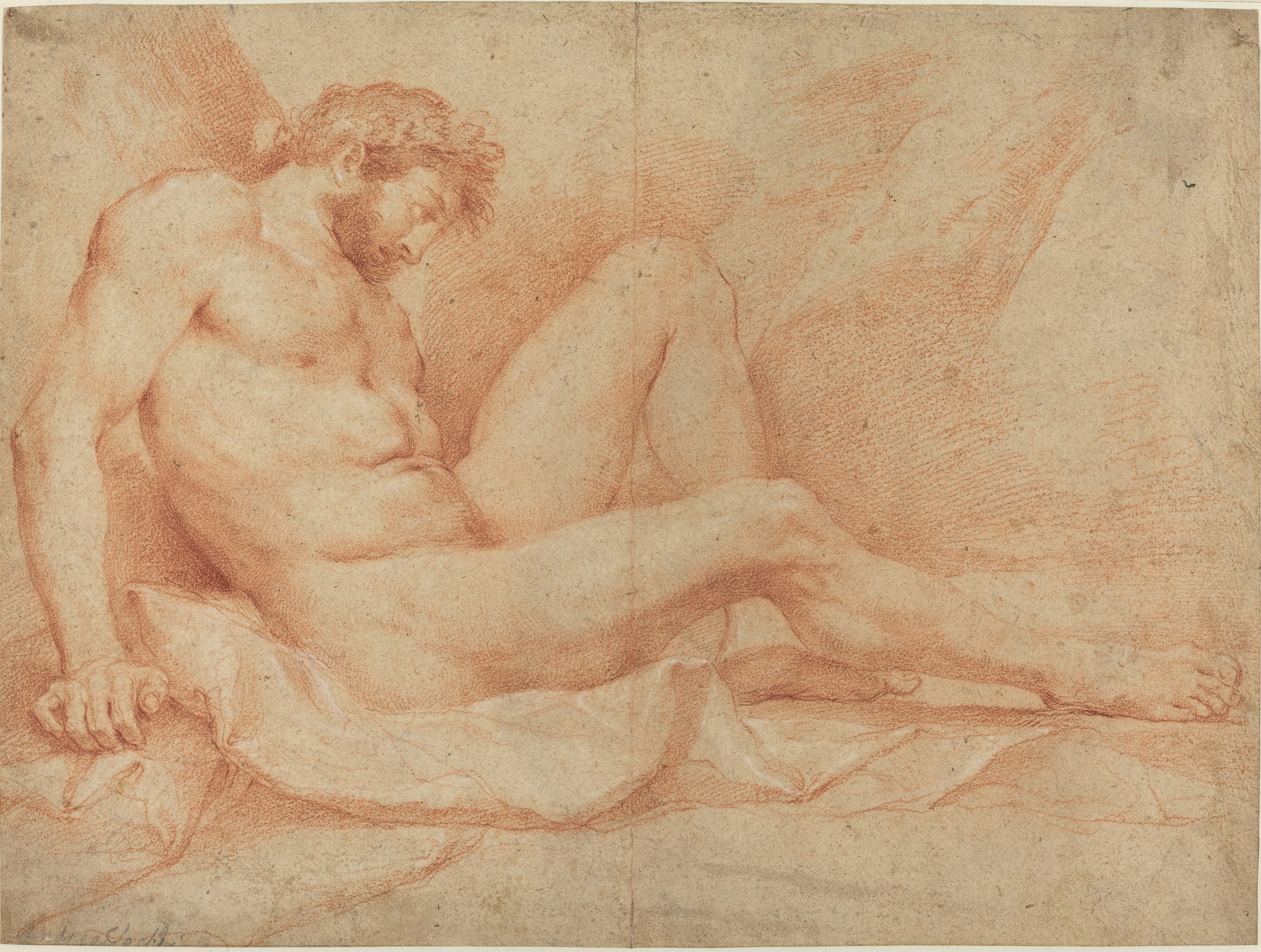
Academic Nude Study of a Seated Male, National Gallery of Art, Washington, D.C.

The Drunkenness of Noah, Metropolitan Museum of Art, New York

Two studies of the bust of a man, 1640s, Art Gallery of South Australia, Adelaide

The Shipwrecked Alphone Rescues Lisamante from a panther, Metropolitan Museum of Art, New York

== Bibliography ==
- Posse, Hans (1925). Der römische Maler Andrea Sacchi: ein Beitrag zur Geschichte der klassizistischen Bewegung im Barock (in German). Leipzig: E.A. Seemann.
- Lechner, George S. (1976). "Tommaso Campanella and Andrea Sacchi's Fresco of Divina Sapienza in the Palazzo Barberini". The Art Bulletin. 58 (1): 97–108. doi:10.2307/3049467.
- Sutherland Harris, Ann (2003). "Sacchi, Andrea". Grove Art Online. Oxford: Oxford University Press. doi:10.1093/gao/9781884446054.article.T074853.
- Marcheteau de Quinçay, Christophe (2007). Didon abandonnée de Andrea Sacchi. Caen: Musée des Beaux-Arts de Caen. ISBN 978-2-901296-24-9.
