= List of painters in the National Gallery of Art =

The List of painters in the National Gallery of Art is a list of the named artists in the National Gallery of Art, Washington, D.C. whose works there comprise oil paintings, gouaches, tempera paintings, and pastels. The online collection contains roughly 4,000 paintings by 1,000 artists, but only named painters with the previously mentioned techniques are listed alphabetically here. The artist's name is followed by a title of one of their works and its ID number. For artists with more than one work in the collection, or for works by unnamed or unattributed artists, see the National Gallery of Art website or the corresponding Wikimedia Commons category. Of artists listed, there are only 18 women, including Rosalba Carriera, Mary Cassatt, Angelica Kauffmann, Judith Leyster, Georgia O'Keeffe, Élisabeth Louise Vigée Le Brun, and Marguerite Zorach.

For the complete list of artists and their artworks in the collection, see the website www.nga.gov

== A ==
- Lemuel Francis Abbott (1760–1803), British : Captain Robert Calder, oil on canvas, ID: 1954.1.8
- Willem van Aelst (1627–1683), Dutch : Still Life with Dead Game, oil on canvas, ID: 1982.36.1
- Josef Albers (1888–1976), American, born Germany : Study for Homage to the Square: Light Rising, oil on wood fiberboard, ID: 1992.28.1
- Ivan Le Lorraine Albright (1897–1983), American : There Were No Flowers Tonight, oil on canvas, ID: 1972.7.1
- Francis Alexander (1800–1880), American : Aaron Baldwin, oil on wood, ID: 1945.11.1
- Joseph Alexander Ames (1816–1872), American : George Southward (?), oil on wood, ID: 1947.17.21
- Giuseppe Angeli (1712–1798), Venetian : Elijah Taken Up in a Chariot of Fire, oil on canvas, ID: 1952.5.70
- Fra Angelico (1387–1455), Florentine : The Madonna of Humility, tempera on panel, ID: 1937.1.5
- Thomas Pollock Anshutz (1851–1912), American : On the Ohio, oil on linen on composition board, ID: 2015.19.95
- Giuseppe Arcimboldo (1526–1593), Italian : Four Seasons in One Head, oil on panel, ID: 2010.77.1
- Jan Asselijn (1615–1652), Dutch : The Tiber River with the Ponte Molle at Sunset, oil on canvas, ID: 2012.129.1
- Balthasar van der Ast (1593–1656), Dutch : Basket of Flowers, oil on panel, ID: 1992.51.2
- John James Audubon (1785–1851), American : Osprey and Weakfish, oil on canvas on hardboard, ID: 2005.32.1
- John Woodhouse Audubon (1812–1862), American : Black–Footed Ferret, oil on canvas, ID: 1951.9.1
- Hendrick Avercamp (1585–1634), Dutch : A Scene on the Ice, oil on panel, ID: 1967.3.1

== B ==
- Francesco Bacchiacca (1494–1557), Florentine : The Flagellation of Christ, oil on panel, ID: 1952.5.81
- Francis Bacon (1909–1992), British : Study for a Running Dog, oil on canvas, ID: 1976.7.1
- Joseph Badger (1708–1765), American : Eleanor Wyer Foster (Mrs. Isaac Foster), oil on bed ticking, ID: 1957.11.2
- Ludolf Bakhuizen (1631–1708), Dutch : Ships in Distress off a Rocky Coast, oil on canvas, ID: 1985.29.1
- Baldassare d'Este (1432–1506), Ferrarese : Francesco II Gonzaga, Fourth Marquis of Mantua, tempera on panel, ID: 1943.4.41
- Hans Baldung (1484–1545), German : Saint Anne with the Christ Child, the Virgin, and Saint John the Baptist, oil on hardboard transferred from panel, ID: 1961.9.62
- James Bard (1815–1897), American : Steamer "St. Lawrence", oil on canvas, ID: 1953.5.2
- Thomas Jones Barker (1815–1882), British : Shepherd Boys and Dog Sheltering from a Storm, oil on paper on canvas, ID: 1956.9.1
- Andrea di Bartolo (1360–1428), Sienese : Joachim and the Beggars, tempera on panel, ID: 1939.1.43
- Bartolomeo Veneto (c. 1480 – c. 1546), Lombard–Venetian : Portrait of a Gentleman, oil on panel transferred to canvas, ID: 1939.1.257
- Georg Baselitz (born 1938), German : Mann im Mond – Franz Pforr (Man in the Moon – Franz Pforr), oil on canvas, ID: 1995.96.1
- Jacopo Bassano (1510–1592), Venetian : The Annunciation to the Shepherds, oil on canvas, ID: 1939.1.126
- Leila T. Bauman (active 1850 or after), American : Geese in Flight, oil on canvas, ID: 1958.9.1
- Gustave Baumann (1881–1971), American (German born): Bright Angel Trail, woodcut on tan laid paper with multicolored fibers, ID: 2013.124.2
- Frédéric Bazille (1841–1870), French : Young Woman with Peonies, oil on canvas, ID: 1983.1.6
- Francis A. Beckett (c. 1833 – 1884 or after), American : Blacksmith Shop, oil on canvas, ID: 1966.13.4
- William Beechey (1753–1839), Sir : Lieutenant–General Sir Thomas Picton, oil on canvas, ID: 1961.5.1
- Osias Beert (1580–1623), Flemish : Dishes with Oysters, Fruit, and Wine, oil on panel, ID: 1995.32.1
- Jacopo Bellini (1400–1471), Venetian : Saint Anthony Abbot and Saint Bernardino of Siena, tempera on panel, ID: 1990.118.1
- Giovanni Bellini (1435–1516), Venetian : Portrait of a Young Man, oil on panel, ID: 1939.1.182
- Bernardo Bellotto (1720–1780), Venetian : View of Munich, oil on canvas, ID: 1961.9.64
- George Bellows (1882–1925), American : Both Members of This Club, oil on canvas, ID: 1944.13.1
- Francesco Benaglio (c. 1430 – c. 1492), Veronese : Saint Jerome, tempera on panel, ID: 1952.5.51
- Frank Weston Benson (1862–1951), American : Margaret ("Gretchen") Strong, oil on canvas, ID: 1992.66.1
- Thomas Hart Benton (1889–1975), American : Trail Riders, oil on canvas, ID: 1975.42.1
- Benvenuto Di Giovanni (1436–1518), Sienese : The Adoration of the Magi, tempera on panel, ID: 1937.1.10
- Nicolaes Pieterszoon Berchem (1620–1683), Dutch : View of an Italian Port, oil on canvas, ID: 1990.62.1
- Ambrogio Bergognone (c. 1453 – 1523), Lombard : Christ Risen from the Tomb, oil on panel, ID: 1952.5.1
- Bernardo Cavallino (1616–1656), Neapolitan : The Triumph of Galatea, oil on canvas, ID: 2000.61.1
- Biagio d'Antonio (1446–1516), Florentine : Portrait of a Boy, oil and tempera on panel, ID: 1939.1.179
- Albert Bierstadt (1830–1902), American : Lake Lucerne, oil on canvas, ID: 1990.50.1
- George Caleb Bingham (1811–1879), American : Mississippi Boatman, oil on canvas, ID: 2004.66.1
- Peter Binoit (1590–1632), German : Still Life with Iris, oil on copper, ID: 2012.99.3
- William Blake (1757–1827), British : The Last Supper, tempera on canvas, ID: 1954.13.1
- Ralph Albert Blakelock (1847–1919), American : The Artist's Garden, oil on canvas, ID: 1954.4.2
- Arnold Böcklin (1827–1901), Swiss : The Sanctuary of Hercules, oil on wood, ID: 1976.36.1
- Jan Boeckhorst (1604–1688), Flemish : Saint Martin Dividing His Cloak, oil on panel, ID: 1970.17.107
- Louis-Léopold Boilly (1761–1845), French : A Painter's Studio, oil on canvas, ID: 1943.7.1
- Giovanni Antonio Boltraffio (1467–1516), Milanese : Portrait of a Youth, oil on panel, ID: 1946.19.2
- Richard Parkes Bonington (1802–1828), British : Seapiece: Off the French Coast, oil on canvas, ID: 1982.55.1
- Pierre Bonnard (1867–1947), French : Work Table, oil on canvas, ID: 2006.128.12
- Gerard ter Borch (1617–1681), Dutch : The Suitor's Visit, oil on canvas, ID: 1937.1.58
- Hieronymus Bosch (1450–1516), Netherlandish : Death and the Miser, oil on panel, ID: 1952.5.33
- Thomas Willeboirts Bosschaert (1613–1654), Dutch : Bouquet of Flowers in a Glass Vase, oil on copper, ID: 1996.35.1
- Andries Both (1612–1642), Dutch : An Italianate Evening Landscape, oil on canvas, ID: 2000.91.1
- Sandro Botticelli (1444–1510), Florentine : Giuliano de' Medici, tempera on panel, ID: 1952.5.56
- François Boucher (1703–1770), French : The Bath of Venus, oil on canvas, ID: 1943.7.2
- Eugène Boudin (1824–1898), French : On the Jetty, oil on wood, ID: 1970.17.13
- Sébastien Bourdon (1616–1671), French : The Finding of Moses, oil on canvas, ID: 1961.9.65
- Dieric Bouts (1415–1475), Netherlandish : Madonna and Child, oil on panel, ID: 1986.67.1
- John Bradley (active 1827/1847), American : Little Girl in Lavender, oil on canvas, ID: 1958.9.3
- Georges Braque (1882–1963), French : The Port of La Ciotat, oil on canvas, ID: 1998.74.6
- Jan de Bray (1627–1697), Dutch : Portrait of the Artist's Parents, Salomon de Bray and Anna Westerbaen, oil on panel, ID: 2001.86.1
- Carl Fredrik von Breda (1759–1818), Swedish : Mrs. William Hartigan, oil on canvas, ID: 1942.8.15
- Adam van Breen (1585–1642), Dutch : Skating on the Frozen Amstel River, oil on panel, ID: 2010.20.1
- Bronzino (1503–1572), Florentine : A Young Woman and Her Little Boy, oil on panel, ID: 1942.9.6
- Samuel Marsden Brookes (1816–1892), American : Still Life with Fan and Pendant, oil on board, ID: 2004.165.3
- Adriaen Brouwer (1605–1638), Flemish : Youth Making a Face, oil on panel, ID: 1994.46.1
- Mather Brown (1761–1831), American : Thomas Dawson, Viscount Cremorne, oil on canvas, ID: 1947.17.28
- W.H. Brown (active 1886/1887), American : Bareback Riders, oil on cardboard on wood, ID: 1958.9.4
- Jan Brueghel the Elder (1568–1624), Flemish : Flowers in a Basket and a Vase, oil on panel, ID: 1992.51.7
- George de Forest Brush (1855–1941), American : An Arapahoe Boy, oil on canvas (grisaille), ID: 2007.138.1
- Barthel Bruyn the Elder (1493–1553), German : Portrait of a Man, oil on panel, ID: 1953.3.5
- Jonathan Budington (c. 1779 – 1823), American : Father and Son, oil on canvas, ID: 1956.13.1
- Giuliano Bugiardini (1475–1554), Florentine : Portrait of a Young Woman, oil on canvas, ID: 1939.1.31
- Horace Bundy (1814–1883), American : Vermont Lawyer, oil on canvas, ID: 1953.5.4

== C ==
- Gustave Caillebotte (1848–1894), French : Skiffs, oil on canvas, ID: 1985.64.6
- H. Call (active 1876), American : Prize Bull, oil on canvas, ID: 1980.62.3
- Canaletto (1697–1768), Venetian : Entrance to the Grand Canal from the Molo, Venice, oil on canvas, ID: 1945.15.4
- Simone Cantarini (1612–1648), Pesarese : Saint Matthew and the Angel, oil on canvas, ID: 1972.44.1
- Giovanni Cariani (c. 1485 – 1547), Venetian : A Concert, oil on canvas, ID: 1997.57.2
- Emil Carlsen (1853–1932), American : Still Life with Fish, oil on canvas, ID: 1963.10.93
- Fra Carnevale (c. 1425 – 1484), Umbrian–Florentine : The Annunciation, tempera on panel, ID: 1939.1.218
- Annibale Carracci (1560–1609), Bolognese : River Landscape, oil on canvas, ID: 1952.5.58
- Ludovico Carracci (1555–1619), Bolognese : The Dream of Saint Catherine of Alexandria, oil on canvas, ID: 1952.5.59
- Rosalba Carriera (1675–1757), Venetian : Painting, pastel, ID: 1939.1.136
- John William Casilear (1811–1893), American : View on Lake George, oil on canvas, ID: 1978.6.1
- Mary Cassatt (1844–1926), American : Girl Arranging Her Hair, oil on canvas, ID: 1963.10.97
- Andrea del Castagno (1410–1457), Florentine : Portrait of a Man, tempera on panel, ID: 1937.1.17
- George Catlin (1796–1872), American : The White Cloud, Head Chief of the Iowas, oil on canvas, ID: 1965.16.347
- Jean-Charles Cazin (1841–1901), French : The Windmill, oil on wood, ID: 1949.1.1
- Vija Celmins (born Latvia, 1938), American : Tulip Car #1, oil on canvas, ID: 2005.142.12
- Giuseppe Cesari (1568–1640), Roman : Martyrdom of Saint Margaret, oil on panel, ID: 1984.4.1
- Paul Cézanne (1839–1906), French : The Battle of Love, oil on canvas, ID: 1972.9.2
- Marc Chagall (1887–1985), Russian : Houses at Vitebsk, oil on paper on canvas, ID: 1973.7.1
- Thomas Chambers (1808–1869), English-American : Lake George and the Village of Caldwell, oil on canvas, ID: 1966.13.1
- Philippe de Champaigne (1602–1673), French : The Martyrdom of Saint Lawrence, oil on canvas, ID: 1998.68.1
- Winthrop Chandler (1747–1790), American : Mrs. Samuel Chandler, oil on canvas, ID: 1964.23.2
- Jean-Baptiste-Siméon Chardin (1699–1779), French : The Little Schoolmistress, oil on canvas, ID: 1937.1.91
- William Merritt Chase (1849–1916), American : A Friendly Call, oil on canvas, ID: 1943.1.2
- Thomas Chimes (1921–2009), American : Messenger, oil on wood, ID: 2009.122.1
- Chipman (active mid-19th century), American : Melons and Grapes, oil on canvas, ID: 1957.11.5
- Petrus Christus (1415–1476), Netherlandish : Portrait of a Female Donor, oil on panel, ID: 1961.9.11
- Frederic Edwin Church (1826–1900), American : El Rio de Luz (The River of Light), oil on canvas, ID: 1965.14.1
- Cimabue (1240–1302), Florentine : Madonna and Child with Saint John the Baptist and Saint Peter, tempera on panel, ID: 1952.5.60
- Alvan Clark (1804–1887), American : Lovice Corbett Whittemore (Mrs. Thomas Whittemore), oil on canvas, ID: 1950.8.2
- Joos van Cleve (1485–1541), Netherlandish : Margaretha Boghe, Wife of Joris Vezeleer, oil on panel, ID: 1962.9.2
- Chuck Close (1940–2021), American : Nat, acrylic on canvas, ID: 2005.108.1
- François Clouet (c. 1510 – 1572), French : A Lady in Her Bath, oil on oak, ID: 1961.9.13
- Elias V. Coe (1794–1843), American : Henry W. Houston, oil on canvas, ID: 1957.11.6
- Thomas Cole (1801–1848), American : Sunrise in the Catskills, oil on canvas, ID: 1989.24.1
- Cima da Conegliano (c. 1459 – 1517/18), Venetian : Madonna and Child with Saint Jerome and Saint John the Baptist, oil on panel, ID: 1937.1.33
- John Constable (1776–1837), British : Wivenhoe Park, Essex, oil on canvas, ID: 1942.9.10
- Jean Joseph Benjamin Constant (1845–1902), French : The Favorite of the Emir, oil on canvas, ID: 2010.95.1
- Jacopino del Conte (c. 1515 – 1598), Florentine : Madonna and Child with Saint Elizabeth and Saint John the Baptist, oil on panel, ID: 1985.11.1
- L.M. Cooke (active 1901), American : Salute to General Washington in New York Harbor, oil on canvas, ID: 1953.5.7
- Adriaen Coorte (1660–1707), Dutch : Still Life with Asparagus and Red Currants, oil on canvas, ID: 2002.122.1
- John Singleton Copley (1738–1815), American : Watson and the Shark, oil on canvas, ID: 1963.6.1
- Jean-Baptiste-Camille Corot (1796–1875), French : Ville–d'Avray, oil on canvas, ID: 1955.9.1
- Antonio da Correggio (1489–1534), Parmese : The Mystic Marriage of Saint Catherine, oil on panel, ID: 1939.1.83
- Piero di Cosimo (1462–1521), Florentine : The Visitation with Saint Nicholas and Saint Anthony Abbot, oil on panel, ID: 1939.1.361
- Francesco del Cossa (c. 1435 – c. 1477), Ferrarese : The Crucifixion, tempera on panel, ID: 1952.5.5
- Francis Cotes (1726–1770), British : Mrs. Thomas Horne, oil on canvas, ID: 1961.5.2
- Gustave Courbet (1819–1877), French : Boats on a Beach, Etretat, oil on canvas, ID: 1972.9.7
- Lucas Cranach the Elder (1472–1553), German : The Nymph of the Spring, oil on panel, ID: 1957.12.1
- Ralston Crawford (1906–1978), American : Lights in an Aircraft Plant, oil on canvas, ID: 1971.87.1
- Lorenzo di Credi (1459–1537), Florentine : Madonna and Child with a Pomegranate, oil on panel, ID: 1952.5.65
- Giuseppe Crespi (1665–1747), Bolognese : Tarquin and Lucretia, oil on canvas, ID: 1952.5.30
- Donato Creti (1671–1749), Bolognese : Alexander the Great Threatened by His Father, oil on canvas, ID: 1961.9.6
- Carlo Crivelli (1430/35–1495), Venetian : Madonna and Child, tempera on panel, ID: 1939.1.264
- John Crome (1768–1821), British : Moonlight on the Yare, oil on canvas, ID: 1983.1.39
- Jasper Francis Cropsey (1823–1900), American : Autumn – On the Hudson River, oil on canvas, ID: 1963.9.1
- George Cuitt the Younger (1779–1854), British : Easby Abbey, near Richmond, oil on canvas, ID: 1959.1.1
- John Steuart Curry (1897–1946), American : Circus Elephants, oil on canvas, ID: 1976.50.1
- Aelbert Cuyp (1620–1691), Dutch : A Pier Overlooking Dordrecht, oil on panel, ID: 2012.73.1

== D ==
- Leonardo da Vinci (1452–1519), Florentine : Ginevra de' Benci [obverse], oil on panel, ID: 1967.6.1.a
- Bernardo Daddi (c. 1280 – 1348), Florentine : Saint Paul, tempera on panel, ID: 1937.1.3
- Johan Christian Dahl (1788–1857), Norwegian : View from Vaekero near Christiania, oil on canvas, ID: 1999.99.1
- Salvador Dalí (1904–1989), Spanish : The Sacrament of the Last Supper, oil on canvas, ID: 1963.10.115
- Michel-François Dandré-Bardon (1700–1783), French : The Adoration of the Skulls, oil on canvas, ID: 1956.3.1
- Charles-François Daubigny (1817–1878), French : Washerwomen at the Oise River near Valmondois, oil on wood, ID: 1949.1.3
- Honoré Daumier (1808–1879), French : Advice to a Young Artist, oil on canvas, ID: 1941.6.1
- Gerard David (1460–1523), Netherlandish : The Rest on the Flight into Egypt, oil on panel, ID: 1937.1.43
- Jacques-Louis David (1748–1825), French : The Emperor Napoleon in His Study at the Tuileries, oil on canvas, ID: 1961.9.15
- Arthur Bowen Davies (1862–1928), American : Sweet Tremulous Leaves, oil on canvas, ID: 1963.10.119
- Jeremiah Davison (c. 1695 – 1745), Scottish : James, 5th Duke of Hamilton, oil on canvas, ID: 1947.17.29
- Joseph Decker (1853–1924), American : Grapes, oil on canvas, ID: 1994.59.3
- Edgar Degas (1834–1917), French : Scene from the Steeplechase: The Fallen Jockey, oil on canvas, ID: 1999.79.10
- Eugène Delacroix (1798–1863), French : Christopher Columbus and His Son at La Rábida, oil on canvas, ID: 1963.10.127
- Georges de La Tour (1593–1652), French : The Repentant Magdalen, oil on canvas, ID: 1974.52.1
- Robert Delaunay (1885–1941), French : Political Drama, oil and collage on cardboard, ID: 1971.2.1
- Simon Denis (1755–1813), Belgian : View near Naples, oil on paper on canvas, ID: 1998.21.1
- The Denison Limner (active c. 1790), American : Miss Denison of Stonington, Connecticut (possibly Matilda Denison), oil on canvas, ID: 1980.62.28
- André Derain (1880–1954), French : Mountains at Collioure, oil on canvas, ID: 1982.76.4
- Arthur William Devis (1712–1787), British : Members of the Maynard Family in the Park at Waltons, oil on canvas, ID: 1964.2.4
- Thomas Dewing (1851–1938), American : Lady with a Lute, oil on wood, ID: 1978.60.1
- Matteo Di Giovanni (c. 1430 – 1495), Sienese : Madonna and Child with Saint Jerome, Saint Catherine of Alexandria, and Angels, tempera (?) on panel, ID: 1939.1.297
- Benedetto Diana (c. 1460 – 1525), Venetian : The Presentation and Marriage of the Virgin, and the Annunciation, oil on panel, ID: 1961.9.70
- Narcisse Virgilio Díaz (1807–1876), French : Forest Scene, oil on wood, ID: 1949.1.4
- Richard Diebenkorn (1922–1993), American : Seated Figure with Hat, oil on canvas, ID: 1991.176.1
- Anthony van Dyck (1599–1641), Sir : Henri II de Lorraine, oil on canvas, ID: 1947.14.1
- Lamar Dodd (1909–1996), American : Winter Valley, oil on canvas, ID: 1971.3.1
- Domenichino (1581–1641), Italian : The Rebuke of Adam and Eve, oil on canvas, ID: 2000.3.1
- Domenico Di Bartolo (c. 1400 – c. 1447), Sienese : Madonna and Child Enthroned with Saint Peter and Saint Paul, tempera (?) on panel, ID: 1961.9.3
- Kees van Dongen (1877–1968), French : Saida, oil on canvas, ID: 1998.74.2
- Battista Dossi (c. 1490 – 1548), Ferrarese : Circe and Her Lovers in a Landscape, oil on canvas, ID: 1943.4.49
- Gerrit Dou (1613–1675), Dutch : The Hermit, oil on oak panel, ID: 1960.6.8
- Thomas Doughty (1793–1856), American : Fanciful Landscape, oil on canvas, ID: 1963.9.2
- Arthur Dove (1880–1946), American : Moon, oil on canvas, ID: 2000.39.1
- François-Hubert Drouais (1727–1775), French : Family Portrait, oil on canvas, ID: 1946.7.4
- Duccio (1255–1319), Sienese : The Nativity with the Prophets Isaiah and Ezekiel, tempera on single panel, ID: 1937.1.8
- Raoul Dufy (1877–1953), French : The Beach at Sainte–Adresse, oil on canvas, ID: 1998.74.3
- Robert Seldon Duncanson (1821–1872), American : Still Life with Fruit and Nuts, oil on board, ID: 2011.98.1
- William Dunlap (1766–1839), American : Samuel Griffin, oil on canvas, ID: 1953.5.80
- Gainsborough Dupont (1754–1797), British : Georgiana, Duchess of Devonshire, oil on canvas, ID: 1970.17.119
- Asher Brown Durand (1796–1886), American : Forest in the Morning Light, oil on canvas, ID: 1978.6.2
- Albrecht Dürer (1471–1528), German : Lot and His Daughters [reverse], oil on panel, ID: 1952.2.16.b
- George Henry Durrie (1820–1863), American : Winter in the Country, oil on canvas, ID: 1994.59.1
- Frank Duveneck (1848–1919), American : Leslie Pease Barnum, oil on canvas, ID: 1942.8.3

== E ==
- Thomas Eakins (1844–1916), American : Study for "Negro Boy Dancing": The Boy, oil on canvas, ID: 1985.64.15
- Ralph Earl (1751–1801), American : Thomas Earle, oil on canvas, ID: 1947.17.42
- Francis William Edmonds (1806–1863), American : The Bashful Cousin, oil on canvas, ID: 1978.6.4
- Gerbrand van den Eeckhout (1621–1674), Dutch : The Levite at Gibeah, oil on canvas, ID: 1996.99.1
- Jacob Eichholtz (1776–1842), American : William Clark Frazer, oil on canvas, ID: 1947.17.3
- Charles Loring Elliott (1812–1868), American : William Sidney Mount, oil on canvas, ID: 1947.17.6
- Jan van Eyck (c.1390–1441), Netherlandish : The Annunciation, oil on canvas transferred from panel, ID: 1937.1.39

== F ==
- Johann Joachim Faber (1778–1846), German : Civitella Seen from the North, oil paint over indented lines on beige prepared laid paper, partially varnished, ID: 2007.111.76
- Henri Fantin-Latour (1836–1904), French : Self–Portrait, oil on canvas, ID: 1995.47.9
- Joseph Anderson Faris (1833–1909), American : The Neigh of an Iron Horse, oil on canvas, ID: 1980.62.69
- Jean Fautrier (1898–1964), French : Body and Soul, oil and varnish with sand and dry pigment on paper mounted on canvas, ID: 2003.138.1
- Paolo di Giovanni Fei (c. 1345 – c. 1411), Sienese : The Presentation of the Virgin, tempera on wood transferred to hardboard, ID: 1961.9.4
- Lyonel Feininger (1871–1956), American : The Bicycle Race, oil on canvas, ID: 1985.64.17
- Robert Feke (1707 – c. 1752), American : Captain Alexander Graydon, oil on canvas, ID: 1966.13.2
- John Ferneley (1782–1860), British : Heaton Park Races, oil on canvas, ID: 1970.17.110
- Ercole de' Roberti (1450–1469), Ferrarese : Giovanni II Bentivoglio, tempera on panel, ID: 1939.1.219
- Domenico Fetti (c. 1589 – 1623), Roman : The Veil of Veronica, oil on panel, ID: 1952.5.7
- Erastus Salisbury Field (1805–1900), American : He Turned Their Waters into Blood, oil on canvas, ID: 1964.23.3
- Pier Francesco Fiorentino (1444/1445–after 1497), Florentine : Madonna and Child, tempera on panel transferred to canvas, ID: 1939.1.214
- Juan de Flandes (1465–1519), Hispano–Flemish : The Annunciation, oil on panel, ID: 1961.9.22
- Jean-Louis Forain (1852–1931), French : The Artist's Wife Fishing, oil on canvas, ID: 1985.64.19
- Jean-Honoré Fragonard (1732–1806), French : Love as Folly, oil on canvas, ID: 1970.17.111
- Francesco di Giorgio Martini (1439–1501), Sienese : The Nativity, with God the Father Surrounded by Angels and Cherubim, tempera on panel, ID: 1941.100.2; National Gallery of Art, Washington, D.C. Samuel H. Kress Collection, 1952.5.8 1952.5.8.combined
- Francesco Francia (1447–1517), Bolognese : Bishop Altobello Averoldo, oil on panel, ID: 1952.5.64
- Frans Francken the Younger (1581–1642), Flemish : Garland of Flowers with Adoration of the Shepherds, oil on copper, ID: 2003.140.1
- Helen Frankenthaler (1928–2011), American : Nature Abhors a Vacuum, acrylic on canvas, ID: 2004.129.1
- Frederick Carl Frieseke (1874–1939), American : Memories, oil on canvas, ID: 1969.5.1
- James Frothingham (1786–1864), American : Ebenezer Newhall, oil on canvas, ID: 1947.17.50
- George Fuller (1822–1884), American : Agnes Gordon Higginson Fuller (Mrs. George Fuller), oil on canvas, ID: 1948.1.1
- Henry Fuseli (1741–1825), Swiss : Oedipus Cursing His Son, Polynices, oil on canvas, ID: 1983.1.41

== G ==
- Agnolo Gaddi (1345–1396), Florentine : Madonna Enthroned with Saints and Angels [middle panel], tempera on panel, ID: 1937.1.4.b
- Thomas Gainsborough (1727–1788), British : Mountain Landscape with Bridge, oil on canvas, ID: 1937.1.107
- The Gansevoort Limner (active 1730/1745), American : Young Lady with a Fan, oil on canvas, ID: 1980.61.5
- Daniel Gardner (1750–1805), British : The Hon. Mrs. Gray, oil on canvas, ID: 1942.9.73
- Benvenuto Tisi (c. 1481 – 1559), Ferrarese : Christ Washing the Disciples' Feet, oil on panel, ID: 2001.29.1
- Paul Gauguin (1848–1903), French : Self–Portrait Dedicated to Carrière, oil on canvas, ID: 1985.64.20
- Gentile da Fabriano (c. 1370 – 1427), Marchigian : Madonna and Child Enthroned, tempera on panel, ID: 1939.1.255
- Orazio Gentileschi (1563–1639), Florentine : Saint Cecilia and an Angel, oil on canvas, ID: 1961.9.73
- Théodore Géricault (1791–1824), French : Mounted Trumpeters of Napoleon's Imperial Guard, oil on canvas, ID: 1972.25.1
- Domenico Ghirlandaio (1449–1494), Florentine : Lucrezia Tornabuoni, tempera and oil on panel, ID: 1952.5.62
- Fra Galgario (1655–1743), Italian : Portrait of a Young Man, oil on canvas, ID: 1939.1.102
- Michele Giambono (c. 1400 – c. 1462), Venetian : Saint Peter, tempera (?) on panel, ID: 1939.1.80
- Giannicola di Paolo (c. 1460 – 1544), Umbrian : The Annunciation, oil on panel, ID: 1939.1.155
- Corrado Giaquinto (1703–1766), Italian : Autumn, oil on canvas, ID: 2001.123.1
- Robert Swain Gifford (1840–1905), American : The Artist Sketching at Mount Desert, Maine, oil on canvas, ID: 2004.99.1
- Luca Giordano (1632–1705), Neapolitan : Diana and Endymion, oil on canvas, ID: 1991.20.1
- Giorgione (1477–1510), Venetian : The Adoration of the Shepherds, oil on panel, ID: 1939.1.289
- Giotto (1266–1337), Florentine : Madonna and Child, tempera on panel, ID: 1939.1.256
- Giovanni D'Alemagna (active 1441–1450), German : Saint Apollonia Destroys a Pagan Idol, tempera on panel, ID: 1939.1.7
- Giovanni di Paolo (1403–1482), Sienese : The Adoration of the Magi, tempera on panel, ID: 1937.1.13
- Girolamo di Benvenuto (1470–1524), Sienese : Portrait of a Young Woman, oil on panel, ID: 1939.1.353
- André Giroux (1801–1879), French : Santa Trinità dei Monti in the Snow, oil on paper on canvas, ID: 1997.65.1
- William Glackens (1870–1938), American : Family Group, oil on canvas, ID: 1971.12.1
- Albert Gleizes (1881–1953), French : Football Players (Les Joueurs de football), oil on canvas, ID: 1970.11.1
- Hendrik Goltzius (1558–1617), Dutch : The Fall of Man, oil on canvas, ID: 1996.34.1
- Arshile Gorky (1904–1948), American : Organization, oil on canvas, ID: 1979.13.3
- Jan Gossaert (1478–1532), Netherlandish : Saint Jerome Penitent [left panel], oil on panel, ID: 1952.5.40.a
- Francisco Goya (1746–1828), Spanish : Victor Guye, oil on canvas, ID: 1956.11.1
- Jan van Goyen (1596–1656), Dutch : View of Dordrecht from the Dordtse Kil, oil on panel, ID: 1978.11.1
- Benozzo Gozzoli (1420–1497), Florentine : The Feast of Herod and the Beheading of Saint John the Baptist, tempera (?) on panel, ID: 1952.2.3
- Nancy Graves (1939–1995), American : Agualine, oil on canvas, ID: 2010.14.1
- El Greco (1541–1614), Greek : Laocoön, oil on canvas, ID: 1946.18.1
- John Greenwood (1727–1792), American : Elizabeth Fulford Welshman, oil on canvas, ID: 1961.4.1
- Jean-Baptiste Greuze (1725–1805), French : Ange Laurent de La Live de Jully, oil on canvas, ID: 1946.7.8
- Juan Gris (1887–1927), Spanish : Fantômas, oil on canvas, ID: 1976.59.1
- Matthias Grünewald (1470/80–1528), German : The Small Crucifixion, oil on panel, ID: 1961.9.19
- Francesco Guardi (1712–1793), Venetian : Temporary Tribune in the Campo San Zanipolo, Venice, oil on canvas, ID: 1939.1.129
- Guercino (1591–1666), Bolognese : Cardinal Francesco Cennini, oil on canvas, ID: 1961.9.20
- Paul Guigou (1834–1871), French : Washerwomen on the Banks of the Durance, oil on canvas, ID: 2007.73.1
- Armand Guillaumin (1841–1927), French : The Bridge of Louis Philippe, oil on canvas, ID: 1963.10.155
- Philip Guston (1913–1980), American : Review, oil on canvas, ID: 1992.86.2

== H ==
- J. H. (active 1822), American : Abraham Clark and His Children, oil on wood, ID: 1953.5.40
- John Haberle (1856–1933), American : Imitation, oil on canvas, ID: 1998.96.1
- Frans Hals (1582–1666), Dutch : Adriaen van Ostade, oil on canvas, ID: 1937.1.70
- Sturtevant J. Hamblin (active 1837/1856), American : The Younger Generation, oil on canvas, ID: 1966.13.5
- Juan van der Hamen (1596–1631), Spanish : Still Life with Sweets and Pottery, oil on canvas, ID: 1961.9.75
- Adriaen Hanneman (1603–1671), Dutch : Henry, Duke of Gloucester, oil on canvas, ID: 1937.1.51
- Simon Hantaï (born Hungary, 1922–2008), French : Étude, oil on canvas, ID: 2012.20.1
- Chester Harding (1792–1866), American : Charles Carroll of Carrollton, oil on canvas, ID: 1956.15.1
- William Harnett (1848–1892), American : The Old Violin, oil on canvas, ID: 1993.15.1
- Marsden Hartley (1877–1943), American : Maine Woods, oil on canvas, ID: 1991.71.1
- William Stanley Haseltine (1835–1900), American : Marina Piccola, Capri, oil on paper on canvas, ID: 1953.10.1
- A. Hashagen (active 1847), American : Ship "Arkansas" Leaving Havana, oil on canvas, ID: 1956.13.4
- Childe Hassam (1859–1935), American : Nude Seated, oil on canvas, ID: 1963.10.156
- George A. Hayes (active c. 1870/1885), American : Bare Knuckles, oil on paperboard on wood panel, ID: 1980.62.9
- Martin Johnson Heade (1819–1904), American : Giant Magnolias on a Blue Velvet Cloth, oil on canvas, ID: 1996.14.1
- George Peter Alexander Healy (1813–1894), American : Roxana Atwater Wentworth, oil on canvas, ID: 1970.34.1
- Willem Claeszoon Heda (1594–1680), Dutch : Banquet Piece with Mince Pie, oil on canvas, ID: 1991.87.1
- Jan Davidsz. de Heem (1606–1683), Dutch : Vase of Flowers, oil on canvas, ID: 1961.6.1
- Maarten van Heemskerck (1498–1574), Netherlandish : The Rest on the Flight into Egypt, oil on panel, ID: 1961.9.36
- Al Held (1928–2005), American : Black Angel, acrylic on canvas, ID: 2006.36.1
- Daniel Hendrickson (1723–1788), American : Catharine Hendrickson, oil on canvas, ID: 1953.5.45
- Robert Henri (1865–1929), American : Young Woman in White, oil on canvas, ID: 1949.9.1
- John Frederick Herring the Younger (before 1825–1907), British : Horses' Heads, oil on canvas, ID: 1960.6.23
- Jan van der Heyden (1637–1712), Dutch : An Architectural Fantasy, oil on oak panel, ID: 1968.13.1
- Edward Hicks (1780–1849), American : Peaceable Kingdom, oil on canvas, ID: 1980.62.15
- Joseph Highmore (1692–1780), English : Portrait of a Lady, oil on canvas, ID: 1942.8.5
- John Hilling (1822–1894), British : Burning of Old South Church, Bath, Maine, oil on canvas, ID: 1958.9.7
- Meindert Hobbema (1638–1709), Dutch : A Wooded Landscape, oil on canvas, ID: 1937.1.61
- Joris Hoefnagel (1542–1600), Flemish : Animalia Rationalia et Insecta (Ignis): Title Page, watercolor and gouache with gold on vellum, ID: 1987.20.5.1
- Charles C. Hofmann (c. 1820 – 1882), American : Berks County Almshouse, 1878, oil on zinc, ID: 1953.5.17
- William Hogarth (1697–1764), English : A Scene from The Beggar's Opera, oil on canvas, ID: 1983.1.42
- Hans Holbein the Younger (1497–1543), German : Sir Brian Tuke, oil on panel, ID: 1937.1.65
- Jenny Holzer (born 1950), American : DODDOACID, oil on linen, ID: 2010.78.6
- Winslow Homer (1836–1910), American : The Dinner Horn (Blowing the Horn at Seaside), oil on canvas, ID: 1994.59.2
- Gerard van Honthorst (1592–1656), Dutch : The Concert, oil on canvas, ID: 2013.38.1
- Pieter de Hooch (1629–1683), Dutch : A Dutch Courtyard, oil on canvas, ID: 1937.1.56
- Milton W. Hopkins (1789–1844), American : Aphia Salisbury Rich and Baby Edward, oil on wood, ID: 1958.9.12
- Edward Hopper (1882–1967), American : Cape Cod Evening, oil on canvas, ID: 1982.76.6
- John Hoppner (1758–1810), British : The Hoppner Children, oil on canvas, ID: 1942.9.35
- Jacob van Hulsdonck (1582–1647), Flemish : Wild Strawberries and a Carnation in a Wan–Li Bowl, oil on copper, ID: 2013.1.1
- Charles S. Humphreys (1818–1880), American : The Trotter, oil on canvas, ID: 1953.5.95
- Daniel Huntington (1816–1906), American : Dr. James Hall, oil on canvas, ID: 1947.17.56
- Justus van Huysum (1659–1716), Dutch : Still Life with Flowers and Fruit, oil on panel, ID: 1996.80.1

== I ==
- Jean-Auguste-Dominique Ingres (1780–1867), French : Ulysses, oil on canvas on wood, ID: 1963.10.34
- Henry Inman (1801–1846), American : George Pope Morris, oil on canvas, ID: 1947.17.8
- George Inness (1825–1894), American : The Lackawanna Valley, oil on canvas, ID: 1945.4.1
- Adriaen Isenbrandt (1485–1551), Netherlandish : The Adoration of the Shepherds, oil on panel, ID: 1978.46.1

== J ==
- John Wesley Jarvis (1780–1840), American : Thomas Paine, oil on canvas, ID: 1950.15.1
- Alexej von Jawlensky (1864–1941), Russian : Frosty Day, oil on paper on cardboard, ID: 2004.140.39
- Neil Jenney (born 1945), American : Them and Us, acrylic and graphite on canvas with painted wood frame, ID: 2005.142.23
- William Jennys (1774–1859), American : Everard Benjamin, oil on canvas, ID: 1953.5.21
- Christian Albrecht Jensen (1792–1870), American : Twelve Events in a Dual Universe, oil on canvas, ID: 2007.35.1
- David Johnson (1827–1908), American : Edwin Forrest, oil on canvas, ID: 1947.17.62
- Eastman Johnson (1824–1906), American : Gathering Lilies, oil on board, ID: 2008.66.3
- James Johnson (c. 1765 – after 1825), American : Mr. Baylor, oil on canvas, ID: 1978.80.8
- John Johnston (c. 1753 – 1818), American : John Peck, oil on canvas, ID: 1947.17.65
- Antonio Joli (c. 1700 – 1777), Italian : Procession of Gondolas in the Bacino di San Marco, Venice, oil on canvas, ID: 1945.15.2
- Johan Jongkind (1819–1891), Dutch : The Towpath, oil on canvas, ID: 2006.128.22
- Samuel Jordan (1803/1804–1836 or after), American : Eaton Family Memorial, oil on canvas, ID: 1955.11.9
- John Joven (1997–2025), Colombian : A Little Bit Of Dinosaur, Digital, ID: 1942.8.6

== K ==
- Willem Kalf (1619–1693), Dutch : Still Life, oil on canvas, ID: 1943.7.8
- Wassily Kandinsky (1866–1944), Russian : Improvisation 31 (Sea Battle), oil on canvas, ID: 1978.48.1
- Alex Katz (born 1927), American : Folding Chair, oil on canvas, ID: 2009.104.1
- Angelica Kauffman (1741–1807), Swiss : Possibly Franciska Krasinska, Duchess of Courland, oil on canvas, ID: 1954.5.1
- Ellsworth Kelly (1923–2015), American : Tiger, oil on canvas (five joined panels), ID: 1992.85.1
- Frederick Kemmelmeyer (c. 1755 – c. 1821), German-American : First Landing of Christopher Columbus, oil on canvas, ID: 1966.13.3
- John Frederick Kensett (1816–1872), American : Beacon Rock, Newport Harbor, oil on canvas, ID: 1953.1.1
- Jan van Kessel, senior (1626–1679), Flemish : Study of Butterfly and Insects, oil on copper, ID: 1983.19.3
- Cornelis Janssens van Ceulen (1593–1661), English : Anna Maria van Schurman, oil on panel, ID: 2002.35.1
- Byron Kim (born 1961), American : Synecdoche, oil and wax on lauan plywood, birch plywood, and plywood, ID: 2009.39.1.1–434
- Ernst Ludwig Kirchner (1880–1938), German : Two Girls under an Umbrella, oil on canvas, ID: 1992.58.1
- Paul Klee (1879–1940), Swiss : Persische Nachtigallen (Persian Nightingales), gouache, watercolor, and pen and black ink over graphite on laid paper, mounted on cardboard; the sheet bordered at the top with yellow paper strip mounted to support, ID: 1990.59.2
- Gustav Klimt (1862–1918), Austrian : Baby (Cradle), oil on canvas, ID: 1978.41.1
- Franz Kline (1910–1962), American : C & O, oil on canvas, ID: 1971.87.4
- George Knapton (1698–1778), English : A Graduate of Merton College, Oxford, oil on canvas, ID: 1951.7.1
- Johann Koerbecke (c. 1420 – 1490), German : The Ascension, tempera on panel, ID: 1959.9.5
- Philip van Kouwenbergh (1671–1729), Dutch : Flowers in a Vase, oil on canvas, ID: 1976.26.2
- Walt Kuhn (1877–1949), American : The White Clown, oil on canvas, ID: 1972.9.16
- František Kupka (1871–1957), Czech : Localization of Graphic Motifs II, oil on canvas, ID: 1984.51.1

== L ==
- John La Farge (1835–1910), American : The Last Valley – Paradise Rocks, oil on canvas, ID: 2000.144.1
- Roger de La Fresnaye (1885–1925), French : The Bathers, oil on canvas, ID: 2000.51.1
- A.A. Lamb (active 1864 or after), American : Emancipation Proclamation, oil on canvas, ID: 1955.11.10
- George Cochran Lambdin (1830–1896), American : Vase of Flowers, oil on canvas, ID: 2003.38.1
- James Lambdin (1807–1889), American : Daniel Webster, oil on canvas, ID: 1954.1.1
- Nicolas Lancret (1690–1743), French : La Camargo Dancing, oil on canvas, ID: 1937.1.89
- Fitz Henry Lane (1804–1865), American : Lumber Schooners at Evening on Penobscot Bay, oil on canvas, ID: 1980.29.1
- Nicolas de Largillière (1656–1746), French : Portrait of a Young Man and His Tutor, oil on canvas, ID: 1961.9.26
- Philip Alexius de Laszlo (1869–1937), British : Ailsa Mellon Bruce, oil on canvas, ID: 1970.20.1
- Thomas Lawrence (1769–1830), Sir : Lady Mary Templetown and Her Eldest Son, oil on canvas, ID: 1937.1.96
- Robert Le Lorrain (1666–1743), French : Three Figures Dressed for a Masquerade, oil on canvas, ID: 1961.9.92
- Louis Le Nain (c. 1593 – 1648 ), French : Peasant Interior, oil on canvas, ID: 1952.2.20
- Juan de Valdés Leal (1622–1690), Spanish : The Assumption of the Virgin, oil on canvas, ID: 1961.9.46
- Rico Lebrun (born Italy, 1900–1964), American : The Ragged One, oil on canvas, ID: 1974.87.2
- Fernand Léger (1881–1955), French : Animated Landscape (Paysage animé, 1er état), oil on canvas, ID: 2008.126.1
- Leonid (1896–1976), American : Faraduro, Portugal, oil on canvas, ID: 1952.12.1
- John Frederick Lewis (1804–1876), American : Untitled (Alabama), oil on canvas, ID: 2009.45.1
- Judith Leyster (1609–1660), Dutch : Self–Portrait, oil on canvas, ID: 1949.6.1
- Alexander Liberman (1912–1999), American : Omega IV, oil on canvas, ID: 1977.75.4
- Roy Lichtenstein (1923–1997), American : Cubist Still Life, oil and Magna on canvas, ID: 1983.50.1
- Jan Lievens (1607–1674), Dutch : Bearded Man with a Beret, oil on panel, ID: 2006.172.1
- Glenn Ligon (born 1960), American : Untitled (I Am a Man), oil and enamel on canvas, ID: 2012.109.1
- Jacques Lipchitz (1891–1973), French : Still Life, oil on canvas, ID: 1973.71.1
- Filippo Lippi (1406–1469), Florentine : Pietà (The Dead Christ Mourned by Nicodemus and Two Angels), oil (and possibly tempera) on panel, ID: 1952.5.86
- Lippo Memmi (1291–1356), Sienese : Saint John the Baptist, tempera on panel, ID: 1939.1.291
- Johann Liss (1590–1629), German : The Satyr and the Peasant, oil on canvas, ID: 1942.9.39
- Pietro Longhi (1702–1783), Venetian : The Game of the Cooking Pot, oil on canvas, ID: 1939.1.64
- Charles Amédée Philippe Van Loo (1719–1795), French : Soap Bubbles, oil on canvas, ID: 1945.10.2
- Ambrogio Lorenzetti (1290–1348), Sienese : Madonna and Child with Saint Mary Magdalene and Saint Catherine [left panel], tempera on panel transferred to canvas, ID: 1941.5.1.a
- Claude Lorrain (1604–1682), French : The Judgment of Paris, oil on canvas, ID: 1969.1.1
- Lorenzo Lotto (1480–1556), Venetian : Allegory of Virtue and Vice, oil on panel, ID: 1939.1.156
- Morris Louis (1912–1962), American : 133, acrylic on canvas, ID: 1976.64.1
- Eugenio Lucas Villaamil (1858–1918), Spanish : The Bullfight, oil on canvas, ID: 1954.10.1
- Aurelio Luini (c. 1530 – 1593), Milanese : The Madonna of the Carnation, oil on panel, ID: 1939.1.152
- George Luks (1867–1933), American : The Miner, oil on canvas, ID: 1954.2.1
- Jean Lurçat (1892–1966), French : Maud Dale, oil on canvas, ID: 1963.10.38
- Corneille de Lyon (1505–1575), French : Portrait of a Man, oil on walnut, ID: 1965.8.1

== M ==
- Louis Mader (1842–after 1899), American : Berks County Almshouse, 1895, oil on metal, ID: 1953.5.25
- Nicolaes Maes (1634–1693), Dutch : An Old Woman Dozing over a Book, oil on canvas, ID: 1937.1.63
- Alessandro Magnasco (1667–1749), Italian : Christ at the Sea of Galilee, oil on canvas, ID: 1943.4.31
- René Magritte (1898–1967), Belgian : La condition humaine, oil on canvas, ID: 1987.55.1
- Édouard Manet (1832–1883), French : The Old Musician, oil on canvas, ID: 1963.10.162
- Robert Mangold (born 1937), American : Yellow Wall (Section I + II), oil and acrylic on plywood and metal, ID: 2004.124.1
- Andrea Mantegna (1430–1506), Paduan : Judith with the Head of Holofernes, tempera on panel, ID: 1942.9.42
- Margaritone d'Arezzo (1216–1293), Italian : Madonna and Child Enthroned, tempera on panel, ID: 1952.5.12
- Jacob Maris (1837–1899), Dutch : View of the Mill and Bridge on the Noordwest Buitensingel in The Hague, oil on canvas, ID: 1999.56.1
- Albert Marquet (1875–1947), French : Posters at Trouville, oil on canvas, ID: 1998.74.1
- Benjamin Marshall (1768–1835), British : J.G. Shaddick, the Celebrated Sportsman, oil on canvas, ID: 1999.79.24
- Agnes Martin (1912–2004), American : Untitled #2, acrylic and blue pencil on canvas, ID: 1992.28.6
- John Martin (1789–1854), British : Joshua Commanding the Sun to Stand Still upon Gibeon, oil on canvas, ID: 2004.64.1
- Masaccio (1401–1428), Florentine : The Madonna of Humility, tempera (?) on panel, ID: 1937.1.7
- Masolino da Panicale (1383–1447), Florentine : The Archangel Gabriel, tempera (?) on panel, ID: 1939.1.225
- Master of the Catholic Kings (1485–1500), Spanish : Christ among the Doctors, oil on panel, ID: 1952.5.43
- Master of the Death of Saint Nicholas of Münster (active c. 1460 – 1490), German : Calvary, oil on panel, ID: 2001.70.1
- Master of the Franciscan Crucifixes (active second half 13th century), Umbrian : Saint John the Evangelist, tempera on panel, ID: 1952.5.14
- Master of Frankfurt (1460–1520), Netherlandish : Saint Anne with the Virgin and the Christ Child, oil on panel, ID: 1976.67.1
- Master of Heiligenkreuz (active in the early 15th century–), Austrian : The Death of Saint Clare, oil on panel, ID: 1952.5.83
- Master of the Life of Saint John the Baptist (1325–1350), Italian : Scenes from the Life of Saint John the Baptist, tempera on panel, ID: 1952.5.68
- Master of the Legend of Saint Lucy (1480–1510), Netherlandish : Mary, Queen of Heaven, oil on panel, ID: 1952.2.13
- Master of the Osservanza Triptych (1430–1450), Sienese : The Meeting of Saint Anthony and Saint Paul, tempera on panel, ID: 1939.1.293
- Master of the Prado Adoration of the Magi (active probably third quarter 15th century), Netherlandish : The Presentation in the Temple, oil on panel, ID: 1961.9.28
- Master of the Saint Bartholomew Altarpiece (1465–1510), German : The Baptism of Christ, oil on panel, ID: 1961.9.78
- Master of the Saint Bartholomew Altar (active 1490s–), Umbrian–Sienese : Joseph of Egypt, oil on panel transferred to canvas, ID: 1952.5.2
- Master of Saint Francis (active 1260–1280), Umbrian : Saint John the Evangelist, tempera on panel, ID: 1952.5.16
- Master of Saint Giles (active c. 1490 – 1510), Franco–Flemish : The Baptism of Clovis, oil on panel, ID: 1952.2.15
- Master of Saint Veronica (1400–1420), German : The Crucifixion, tempera on panel, ID: 1961.9.29
- Henri Matisse (1869–1954), French : Woman Seated in an Armchair, oil on canvas, ID: 1989.31.1
- Jan Matsys (1510–1575), Netherlandish : Ill–Matched Lovers, oil on panel, ID: 1971.55.1
- Frederick W. Mayhew (1785–1854), American : Mrs. John Harrisson and Daughter, oil on canvas, ID: 1980.62.17
- Agnolo di Domenico del Mazziere (c. 1466 – 1513), Florentine : Portrait of a Youth, oil on panel transferred to canvas and solid support, ID: 1939.1.294
- Howard Mehring (1931–1978), American : Sequence, acrylic on canvas, ID: 1978.40.1
- Gari Melchers (1860–1932), American : Andrew W. Mellon, oil on canvas, ID: 1953.11.1
- Luis Egidio Meléndez (1715–1780), Spanish : Still Life with Figs and Bread, oil on canvas, ID: 2000.6.1
- Hans Memling (1430–1494), Netherlandish : Saint Veronica [obverse], oil on panel, ID: 1952.5.46.a
- Philippe Mercier (c. 1689 – 1760), French : The Singing Party, oil on canvas, ID: 1952.4.2
- Arnold Mesches (1923–2016), American : The Three Chandeliers, acrylic on canvas, ID: 1994.83.1
- Antonello da Messina (1430–1479), Sicilian : Portrait of a Young Man, tempera and oil on panel, ID: 1937.1.31
- Gabriël Metsu (1629–1667), Dutch : The Intruder, oil on panel, ID: 1937.1.57
- Hans Mielich (1516–1573), German : A Member of the Fröschl Family, oil on panel, ID: 1984.66.1
- Michiel Jansz. van Mierevelt (1567–1641), Dutch : Portrait of a Lady with a Ruff, oil on panel, ID: 1961.5.4
- Abraham Mignon (1640–1679), German : A Hanging Bouquet of Flowers, oil on panel, ID: 1992.51.5
- James Millar (c. 1740/1750 – 1805), British : Lord Algernon Percy, oil on canvas, ID: 1956.9.4
- Jean-François Millet (1814–1875), French : The Bather, oil on wood, ID: 1949.1.9
- Joan Miró (1893–1983), Spanish : The Farm, oil on canvas, ID: 1987.18.1
- Amedeo Modigliani (1884–1920), Italian : Chaïm Soutine, oil on canvas, ID: 1963.10.47
- László Moholy-Nagy (1895–1946), American : Z VII, oil on canvas, ID: 2007.112.1
- Pieter de Molijn (1595–1661), Dutch : Landscape with Open Gate, oil on panel, ID: 1986.10.1
- Lorenzo Monaco (1370–1423), Florentine : Madonna and Child, tempera on panel, ID: 1943.4.13
- Piet Mondrian (1872-1944), Dutch : Tableau No. IV; Lozenge Composition with Red, Gray, Blue, Yellow, and Black, oil on canvas, ID: 1971.51.1
- Claude Monet (1840–1926), French : Sainte–Adresse, oil on canvas, ID: 1990.59.1
- Antonis Mor (1520–1576), Netherlandish : Portrait of a Gentleman, oil on canvas, ID: 1937.1.52
- Thomas Moran (1837–1926), American : The Juniata, Evening, oil on canvas, ID: 2010.107.1
- Henry Moret (1856–1913), French : The Island of Raguenez, Brittany, oil on canvas, ID: 1970.17.46
- Moretto da Brescia (c. 1498 – 1554), Italian : Pietà, oil on panel, ID: 1952.2.10
- Berthe Morisot (1841–1895), French : The Harbor at Lorient, oil on canvas, ID: 1970.17.48
- George Morland (1763–1804), British : The Death of the Fox, oil on canvas, ID: 1942.9.43
- Giovanni Battista Moroni (1525–1578), Italian : Titian's Schoolmaster, oil on canvas, ID: 1942.9.45
- Grandma Moses (1860–1961), American : A Fire in the Woods, oil on board, ID: 1999.81.1
- Fritz Müller (1814–1861 or after), American : Capture of the "Savannah" by the "U.S.S. Perry", oil on canvas, ID: 1967.20.2
- Francesco de Mura (1696–1782), Neapolitan : Alexander Condemning False Praise, oil on canvas, ID: 2010.93.43
- Bartolomé Esteban Murillo (1617–1682), Spanish : The Return of the Prodigal Son, oil on canvas, ID: 1948.12.1

== N ==
- Nardo di Cione (1343–1366), Florentine : Madonna and Child with Saint Peter and Saint John the Evangelist [left panel], tempera on panel, ID: 1939.1.261.a
- Jean-Marc Nattier (1685–1766), French : Joseph Bonnier de la Mosson, oil on canvas, ID: 1961.9.30
- John Neagle (1796–1865), American : Colonel Augustus James Pleasonton, oil on canvas, ID: 1957.9.1
- Eglon van der Neer (1634–1703), Dutch : Moonlit Landscape with Bridge, oil on panel, ID: 1990.6.1
- Neroccio di Bartolomeo de' Landi (1447–1500), Sienese : Madonna and Child with Saint Anthony Abbot and Saint Sigismund, tempera on panel, ID: 1952.5.17
- Barnett Newman (1905–1970), American : Yellow Painting, oil on canvas, ID: 1988.57.3
- Reinier Nooms (1623–1664), Reinier : Amsterdam Harbor Scene, oil on canvas, ID: 2011.3.1

== O ==
- Georgia O'Keeffe (1887–1986), American : Black White and Blue, oil on canvas, ID: 1998.93.1
- Orcagna (1320–1368), Florentine : Madonna and Child with Angels, tempera on panel, ID: 1952.5.18
- Bernard van Orley (1490–1541), Netherlandish : Christ among the Doctors [obverse], oil on panel, ID: 1952.5.47.a
- Adriaen van Ostade (1610–1685), Dutch : Tavern Scene, oil on panel, ID: 1977.21.1
- Jean-Baptiste Oudry (1686–1755), French : Henri Camille, Chevalier de Beringhen, oil on canvas, ID: 1994.14.1

== P ==
- Giovanni Paolo Panini (1691–1765), Roman : Interior of the Pantheon, Rome, oil on canvas, ID: 1939.1.24
- Linton Park (1826–1906), American : Flax Scutching Bee, oil on bed ticking, ID: 1953.5.26
- Jean-Baptiste Pater (1695–1736), French : On the Terrace, oil on canvas, ID: 1955.3.1
- Joseph Paul (1804–1887), British : Landscape with Picnickers and Donkeys by a Gate, oil on canvas, ID: 1942.9.14
- Charles Willson Peale (1741–1827), American : John Philip de Haas, oil on canvas, ID: 1942.8.9
- Rembrandt Peale (1778–1860), American : George Washington, oil on canvas, ID: 1942.7.1
- Raphaelle Peale (1774–1825), American : A Dessert, oil on wood, ID: 1999.44.1
- Max Pechstein (1881–1955), German : Sommermittag, oil on canvas, ID: 2000.178.1
- Robert Peckham (1785–1877), American : The Hobby Horse, oil on canvas, ID: 1955.11.23
- Guy Pène du Bois (1884–1958), American : The Politicians, oil on fabric-covered millboard, ID: 1963.10.138
- Pensionante del Saraceni (1610–1620), French (?) : Still Life with Fruit and Carafe, oil on canvas, ID: 1939.1.159
- Pietro Perugino (1446–1523), Umbrian : The Crucifixion with the Virgin, Saint John, Saint Jerome, and Saint Mary Magdalene [left panel], oil on panel transferred to canvas, ID: 1937.1.27.a
- Francesco Pesellino (1422–1457), Florentine : The Crucifixion with Saint Jerome and Saint Francis, tempera on panel, ID: 1939.1.109
- John Frederick Peto (1854–1907), American : For the Track, oil on canvas, ID: 1997.131.1
- Thomas Phillips (1770–1845), British : Portrait of a Lady, oil on canvas, ID: 1968.6.1
- Ammi Phillips (1788–1865), American : Alsa Slade, oil on canvas, ID: 1953.5.53
- Giovanni Battista Piazzetta (1682–1754), Italian : Madonna and Child Appearing to Saint Philip Neri, oil on canvas, ID: 1961.9.82
- Francis Picabia (1879–1953), French : The Procession, Seville, oil on canvas, ID: 19971997.43.1
- Pablo Picasso (1881–1973), Spanish : The Lovers, oil on linen, ID: 1963.10.192
- Piero della Francesca (c. 1416/1417 – 1492), Italian : Saint Apollonia, tempera on panel, ID: 1952.5.19
- Christoffel Pierson (1631–1714), Dutch : Niche with Falconry Gear, oil on canvas, ID: 2003.39.1
- Pietro della Vecchia (1603–1678), Venetian : Imaginary Self–Portrait of Titian, oil on canvas, ID: 1960.6.39
- Robert Edge Pine (c. 1720/1730 – 1788), American : General William Smallwood, oil on canvas, ID: 1947.17.89
- Camille Pissarro (1830–1903), French : Charing Cross Bridge, London, oil on canvas, ID: 1985.64.32
- Cornelius van Poelenburgh (1595–1667), Dutch : The Prophet Elijah and the Widow of Zarephath, oil on panel, ID: 2004.101.2
- Charles Peale Polk (1767–1822), American : Anna Maria Cumpston, oil on canvas, ID: 1953.5.32
- Jackson Pollock (1912–1956), American : Number 1, 1950 (Lavender Mist), oil, enamel, and aluminum on canvas, ID: 1976.37.1
- Pontormo (1494–1556), Florentine : Monsignor della Casa, oil on panel, ID: 1961.9.83
- Paulus Potter (1625–1654), Dutch : A Farrier's Shop, oil on panel, ID: 1942.9.52
- Nicolas Poussin (1594–1665), French : The Baptism of Christ, oil on canvas, ID: 1946.7.14
- Matthew Pratt (1734–1805), American : William Henry Cavendish Bentinck, 3rd Duke of Portland, oil on canvas, ID: 1942.13.2
- Giovanni Ambrogio de Predis (c. 1455 – after 1508), Milanese : Bianca Maria Sforza, oil on panel, ID: 1942.9.53
- Mattia Preti (1613–1699), Neapolitan : The Martyrdom of Saint Gennaro, oil on canvas, ID: 2000.75.1
- William Matthew Prior (1806–1873), American : The Burnish Sisters, oil on canvas, ID: 1980.62.18
- Giulio Cesare Procaccini (1574–1625), Lombard : The Ecstasy of the Magdalen, oil on canvas, ID: 2002.12.1
- Pierre-Paul Prud'hon (1758–1823), French : David Johnston, oil on canvas, ID: 1961.9.84
- Puccio di Simone (active mid 14th century), Florentine : Madonna Enthroned with Saints [middle panel], tempera on panel, ID: 1937.1.6.b
- Adam Pynacker (1622–1673), Dutch : Wooded Landscape with Travelers, oil on canvas, ID: 1979.27.1

== Q ==
- John Quidor (1801–1881), American : The Return of Rip Van Winkle, oil on canvas, ID: 1942.8.10

== R ==
- Henry Raeburn (1756–1823), Sir : Miss Eleanor Urquhart, oil on canvas, ID: 1937.1.101
- Henry Ward Ranger (1858–1916), American : Spring Woods, oil on canvas, ID: 1963.10.202
- Raphael (1483–1520), Marchigian : Bindo Altoviti, oil on panel, ID: 1943.4.33
- Odilon Redon (1840–1916), French : Saint Sebastian, oil on canvas, ID: 1963.10.57
- Anne Redpath (1895–1965), American : Mounting of the Guard, oil on canvas, ID: 1955.11.3
- David Reed (born 1946), American : #421(1), #421(2), #421(3), #421(4), oil and alkyd on polyvinyl polymer resins, ID: 2007.6.240
- Paul Reed (1919–2015), American : Coherence, acrylic on canvas, ID: 2011.131.1
- Ad Reinhardt (1913–1967), American : Abstract Painting, No. 34, oil on canvas, ID: 1970.37.1
- Rembrandt (1606–1669), Dutch : The Mill, oil on canvas, ID: 1942.9.62
- Pierre-Auguste Renoir (1841–1919), French : The Dancer, oil on canvas, ID: 1942.9.72
- Willem Reuter (1642–1681), Flemish : Saint John the Baptist Preaching, oil on canvas, ID: 2004.101.3
- Joshua Reynolds (1723–1792), Sir : Lady Elizabeth Delmé and Her Children, oil on canvas, ID: 1937.1.95
- Jusepe de Ribera (1590–1656), Spanish : The Martyrdom of Saint Bartholomew, oil on canvas, ID: 1990.137.1
- Sebastiano Ricci (1659–1734), Venetian : The Exaltation of the True Cross, oil on canvas, ID: 1939.1.72
- William Trost Richards (1833–1905), American : October, oil on canvas, ID: 2003.29.1
- Johan Richter (1665–1745), German : Abstract Painting 780–1, oil on canvas, ID: 1993.62.1
- John Riley (1646–1691), English : John Eldred, oil on canvas, ID: 1988.20.1
- Hubert Robert (1733–1808), French : The Ponte Salario, oil on canvas, ID: 1952.5.50
- Theodore Robinson (1852–1896), American : Drawbridge – Long Branch R. R., oil on canvas, ID: 1990.70.1
- George Romney (1734–1802 ), British : Mrs. Davies Davenport, oil on canvas, ID: 1937.1.105
- George Ropes (1788–1819), American : Mount Vernon, oil on canvas, ID: 1956.13.6
- James Rosenquist (1933-2017), American : White Bread, oil on canvas, ID: 2008.36.1
- Pietro Rotari (1707–1762), Venetian : A Girl with a Flower in Her Hair, oil on canvas, ID: 1939.1.108
- Susan Rothenberg (1945–2020), American : Butterfly, acrylic on canvas, ID: 1995.6.1
- Mark Rothko (born Russia, 1903–1970), American : The Omen of the Eagle, oil and graphite on canvas, ID: 1986.43.107
- Henri Rousseau (1844–1910), French : The Equatorial Jungle, oil on canvas, ID: 1963.10.213
- Théodore Rousseau (1812–1867), French : Panoramic View of the Ile–de–France, oil on canvas, ID: 2003.40.1
- Reuben Rowley (active c. 1825/1836), American : Dr. John Safford and Family, oil on canvas, ID: 1980.62.46
- Peter Paul Rubens (1577–1640), Sir : The Meeting of Abraham and Melchizedek, oil on panel, ID: 1958.4.1
- Jacob Isaacksz van Ruisdael (1628–1682), Dutch : Forest Scene, oil on canvas, ID: 1942.9.80
- Salomon van Ruysdael (1602–1670), Dutch : River Landscape with Ferry, oil on canvas, ID: 2007.116.1
- Albert Pinkham Ryder (1847–1917), American : Siegfried and the Rhine Maidens, oil on canvas, ID: 1946.1.1

== S ==
- Pieter Jansz. Saenredam (1597–1665), Dutch : Cathedral of Saint John at 's–Hertogenbosch, oil on panel, ID: 1961.9.33
- Sano di Pietro (1405/1406–1481), Sienese : Madonna and Child with Saint Jerome, Saint Bernardino, and Angels, tempera on panel, ID: 1939.1.274
- Emily Sargent (1857–1936), American
- John Singer Sargent (1856–1925), American : Miss Beatrice Townsend, oil on canvas, ID: 2006.128.31
- Andrea del Sarto (1486–1530), Florentine : Charity, oil on panel, ID: 1957.14.5
- Edward Savage (1761–1817), American : The Washington Family, oil on canvas, ID: 1940.1.2
- Girolamo Savoldo (c. 1480 – c. 1548 ), Brescian : Elijah Fed by the Raven, oil on panel transferred to canvas, ID: 1961.9.35
- Vittore Carpaccio (1465–1527), Venetian : Madonna and Child, oil on panel, ID: 1961.9.8
- Godfried Schalcken (1643–1706), Dutch : Woman Weaving a Crown of Flowers, oil on panel, ID: 2005.26.1
- Hans Leonhard Schäufelein (c. 1480/1485 – 1538/1540), German : Portrait of a Man, oil on panel, ID: 1937.1.66
- The Schuyler Limner (active c. 1717 – 1725), American : Mr. Van Vechten, oil on canvas, ID: 1947.17.74
- Sean Scully (born 1945), American : ONEONEZERONINE RED, oil on linen, ID: 2009.125.1
- Enoch Seeman (c. 1694 – 1745), British : Portrait of an Officer, oil on canvas, ID: 1947.17.26
- Daniel Seghers (1590–1661), Flemish : The Repentant Magdalen, oil on canvas, ID: 1990.68.1
- Jacopo da Sellaio (c. 1441 – 1493), Florentine : Saint John the Baptist, oil on panel, ID: 1939.1.283
- C.F. Senior (active 1881 or after), American : The Sportsman's Dream, oil on canvas, ID: 1980.62.21
- Paul Sérusier (1864–1927), French : Farmhouse at Le Pouldu, oil on canvas, ID: 2000.95.1
- Georges Seurat (1859–1891), French : Seascape at Port–en–Bessin, Normandy, oil on canvas, ID: 1972.9.21
- Charles Sheeler (1883–1965), American : Classic Landscape, oil on canvas, ID: 2000.39.2
- Luca Signorelli (1441–1523), Umbrian : Madonna and Child with Saints and Angels, oil on panel transferred to hardboard, ID: 1961.9.87
- Simone Martini (c. 1284 – 1344), Sienese : The Angel of the Annunciation, tempera on panel, ID: 1939.1.216
- Henry Singleton (1766–1839), British : James Massy–Dawson (?), oil on wood, ID: 1954.1.11
- Alfred Sisley (1839–1899), French : Flood at Port–Marly, oil on canvas, ID: 1985.64.38
- Michael Sittow (1469–1525), Netherlandish : The Assumption of the Virgin, oil on panel, ID: 1965.1.1
- Thomas Skynner (active 1840/1852), American : Portrait of a Woman, oil on canvas, ID: 1967.20.5
- John French Sloan (1871–1951), American : The City from Greenwich Village, oil on canvas, ID: 1970.1.1
- Frans Snyders (1579–1657), Flemish : Still Life with Grapes and Game, oil on panel, ID: 2006.22.1
- Il Sodoma (1477–1549), Sienese : Saint George and the Dragon, oil on panel, ID: 1952.5.76
- Pieter Cornelisz van Soest (1600–1681), Dutch : Lady Borlase, oil on canvas, ID: 1977.63.1
- Andrea Solari (c. 1465 – 1524), Milanese : Lamentation, oil on panel, ID: 1961.9.40
- Pierre Soulages (1919–2022), French : Painting, oil on canvas, ID: 1979.67.1
- Chaïm Soutine (1893–1943), Russian : Portrait of a Boy, oil on canvas, ID: 1963.10.216
- Pieter Soutman (1580–1657), Flemish : A Young Man Holding a Staff, oil on panel, ID: 2010.19.1
- Raphael Soyer (1899–1987), American : Blond Figure, oil on canvas, ID: 1989.25.1
- Lilly Martin Spencer (1822–1902), American : Raspberries, oil on canvas, ID: 2005.161.1
- Abram Ross Stanley (1816–1875), American : Joshua Lamb, oil on canvas, ID: 1980.62.22
- C. Gregory Stapko (1912–2006), American : Dr. John Brinton, oil on canvas, ID: 1962.11.1
- Jan Steen (1626–1679), Dutch : The Dancing Couple, oil on canvas, ID: 1942.9.81
- Hendrik van Steenwijk II (1580–1649), Flemish : Esther and Mordecai, oil on panel, ID: 2006.20.1
- Stefano di Giovanni (1374–1451), Sienese : Saint Apollonia, tempera on panel, ID: 1943.4.5
- Edward Steichen (1879–1973), American : Le Tournesol (The Sunflower), tempera and oil on canvas, ID: 1999.43.1
- Pat Steir (born 1938), American : Herb's Painting, oil on canvas, ID: 2007.6.289
- Frank Stella (born 1936), American : Flin Flon IV, polymer and fluorescent polymer paint on canvas, ID: 1994.82.1
- Alfred Stevens (1823–1906), Belgian : Young Woman in White Holding a Bouquet, oil on wood, ID: 1963.10.65
- Andries Jacobsz Stock (1580–1648), American : Baby in Wicker Basket, oil on canvas, ID: 1980.62.23
- D.G. Stouter (active 1854 or after), American : On Point, oil on canvas, ID: 1980.62.68
- Bernhard Strigel (1460–1528), German : Saint Mary Salome and Her Family, oil on panel, ID: 1961.9.89
- Bernardo Strozzi (1581–1644), Genoese–Venetian : Bishop Alvise Grimani, oil on canvas, ID: 1961.9.41
- Gilbert Stuart (1755–1828), American : Catherine Brass Yates (Mrs. Richard Yates), oil on canvas, ID: 1940.1.4
- George Stubbs (1724–1806), British : White Poodle in a Punt, oil on canvas, ID: 1999.80.22
- Thomas Sully (1783–1872), American : The David Children, oil on canvas, ID: 1948.13.1
- Michiel Sweerts (1618–1664), Flemish : Anthonij de Bordes and His Valet, oil on canvas, ID: 2012.13.1

== T ==
- Augustus Vincent Tack (1870–1949), American : Charles Evans Hughes, oil on canvas board, ID: 1942.1.1
- Rufino Tamayo (1899–1991), Mexican : Clowns, oil on canvas, ID: 1971.87.10
- Henry Ossawa Tanner (1859–1937), American : The Seine, oil on canvas, ID: 1971.57.1
- Tanzio da Varallo (c. 1580 – c. 1632), Piedmontese : Saint Sebastian, oil on canvas, ID: 1939.1.191
- Edmund Tarbell (1862–1938), American : Mother and Mary, oil on canvas, ID: 1967.1.1
- David Teniers the Younger (1610–1690), Flemish : Peasants Celebrating Twelfth Night, oil on panel, ID: 1972.10.1
- Hendrick ter Brugghen (1588–1629), Dutch : Bagpipe Player, oil on canvas, ID: 2009.24.1
- Jeremiah Theus (1719–1774), American : Mary Cuthbert (Mrs. James Cuthbert) (?), oil on canvas, ID: 1965.15.7
- Archie Thompson (active c. 1935), American : Painting of Wagner Family, oil on board, ID: 1943.8.12870
- Bob Thompson (1937–1966), American : Tree, oil on canvas, ID: 2000.39.3
- Giovanni Battista Tiepolo (1696–1770), Venetian : Queen Zenobia Addressing Her Soldiers, oil on canvas, ID: 1961.9.42
- Gillis van Tilborch (1625–1678), Flemish : Self–Portrait in the Studio, oil on panel, ID: 2003.153.1
- Tiberio Tinelli (1586–1638), Venetian : Lodovico Widmann, oil on canvas, ID: 1946.6.1
- Tintoretto (1518–1594), Venetian : A Procurator of Saint Mark's, oil on canvas, ID: 1952.5.79
- James Tissot (1836–1902), French : Hide and Seek, oil on wood, ID: 1978.47.1
- Titian (1485–1576), Venetian : Ranuccio Farnese, oil on canvas, ID: 1952.2.11
- Bradley Walker Tomlin (1899–1953), American : Maneuver for Position, oil on canvas, ID: 1996.81.2
- John Toole (1815–1860), American : Skating Scene, oil on canvas, ID: 1958.9.6
- Joaquín Torres-García (1874–1949), Uruguayan : Untitled Composition, oil on canvas, ID: 2010.15.1
- Henri de Toulouse-Lautrec (1864–1901), French : A Corner of the Moulin de la Galette, oil on cardboard, ID: 1963.10.67
- Jean François de Troy (1679–1752), French : The Abduction of Europa, oil on canvas, ID: 2010.115.1
- Constant Troyon (1810–1865), French : The Approaching Storm, oil on canvas on board, ID: 1995.42.1
- John Trumbull (1756–1843), American : Alexander Hamilton, oil on canvas, ID: 1940.1.8
- Richard Tuttle (born 1941), American : Rendering of Cobalt Wall Painting, acrylic over graphite on Hamilton bond paper, ID: 1991.241.147
- Cosmè Tura (c. 1430 – 1495), Ferrarese : Madonna and Child in a Garden, tempera and oil on panel, ID: 1952.5.29
- J. M. W. Turner (1775–1851), British : Mortlake Terrace, oil on canvas, ID: 1937.1.109
- Lancelot-Théodore Turpin de Crissé (1782–1859), French : View of a Villa, Pizzofalcone, Naples, oil on canvas, ID: 1997.102.1
- John Henry Twachtman (1853–1902), American : Winter Harmony, oil on canvas, ID: 1964.22.1
- Cy Twombly (1928–2011), American : Untitled (Bolsena), oil–based house paint, wax crayon, and graphite on canvas, ID: 1995.73.1

== V ==
- Perino del Vaga (1500–1547), Italian : The Nativity, oil on panel transferred to canvas, ID: 1961.9.31
- Eugène Lawrence Vail (1857–1934), French-American : The Flags, Saint Mark's, Venice - Fête Day, oil on canvas, ID: 1973.1.1
- Pierre-Henri de Valenciennes (1750–1819), French : Study of Clouds over the Roman Campagna, oil on paper on cardboard, ID: 1997.23.1
- Valentin de Boulogne (1591–1632), French : Soldiers Playing Cards and Dice (The Cheats), oil on canvas, ID: 1998.104.1
- Louis Vallée (died 1653), Dutch : Silvio with the Wounded Dorinda, oil on canvas, ID: 2000.114.1
- Félix Vallotton (1865–1925), Swiss : Marigolds and Tangerines, oil on canvas, ID: 1963.10.78
- Vincent van Gogh (1853–1890), Dutch : La Mousmé, oil on canvas, ID: 1963.10.151
- César Van Loo (1743–1821), French : The Marquis d'Ossun, oil on canvas, ID: 1955.7.1
- Pieter Vanderlyn (1687–1778), American : Mary Ellis Bell (Mrs. Isaac Bell), oil on canvas, ID: 1997.19.1
- Antonio Maria Vassallo (c. 1620 – 1664/72), Genoese : The Larder, oil on canvas, ID: 1961.9.91
- Diego Velázquez (1599–1660), Spanish : The Needlewoman, oil on canvas, ID: 1937.1.81
- Willem van de Velde the Younger (1633–1707), the Younger : Ships in a Gale, oil on panel, ID: 2000.72.1
- Domenico Veneziano (c. 1410 – 1461), Florentine : Saint John in the Desert, tempera on panel, ID: 1943.4.48
- Paolo Veneziano (before 1300 – c. 1360), Venetian : The Coronation of the Virgin, tempera on panel, ID: 1952.5.87
- Cornelis Verbeeck (1590–1647), Dutch : A Naval Encounter between Dutch and Spanish Warships, oil on panel, ID: 1995.21.1–2
- Maria Verelst (1680–1744), Dutch : Portrait of a Lady, oil on canvas, ID: 1947.17.95
- Johannes Vermeer (1632–1675), Dutch : Girl with the Red Hat, oil on panel, ID: 1937.1.53
- Claude Joseph Vernet (1714–1789), French : The Shipwreck, oil on canvas, ID: 2000.22.1
- Horace Vernet (1789–1863), French : Hunting in the Pontine Marshes, oil on canvas, ID: 1989.3.1
- Paolo Veronese (1528–1588), Venetian : Saint Jerome in the Wilderness, oil on canvas, ID: 1961.9.47
- Johannes Cornelisz Verspronck (1600–1662), Dutch : Andries Stilte as a Standard Bearer, oil on canvas, ID: 1998.13.1
- Abraham de Verwer (1585–1650), Dutch : View of Hoorn, oil on panel, ID: 2008.32.1
- Louise Élisabeth Vigée Le Brun (1755–1842), French : The Marquise de Pezay, and the Marquise de Rougé with Her Sons Alexis and Adrien, oil on canvas, ID: 1964.11.1
- Sebastiano del Piombo (1485–1547), Venetian : Cardinal Bandinello Sauli, His Secretary, and Two Geographers, oil on panel, ID: 1961.9.37
- Bartolomeo Vivarini (1432–1499), Venetian : Portrait of a Man, oil on panel, ID: 1939.1.355
- Maurice de Vlaminck (1876–1958), French : Tugboat on the Seine, Chatou, oil on canvas, ID: 1998.74.4
- Simon de Vlieger (1600–1653), Dutch : Estuary at Day's End, oil on panel, ID: 1997.101.1
- Antoine Vollon (1833–1900), French : Mound of Butter, oil on canvas, ID: 1992.95.1
- Simon Vouet (1590–1649), French : The Muses Urania and Calliope, oil on panel, ID: 1961.9.61
- Jacob Vrel (1654–1662), Dutch : Young Woman in an Interior, oil on panel, ID: 2012.106.1
- Édouard Vuillard (1868–1940), French : Woman in a Striped Dress, oil on canvas, ID: 1983.1.38

== W ==
- Wagguno (active 1858), American : Fruit and Baltimore Oriole, oil on canvas, ID: 1980.62.47
- Ferdinand Georg Waldmüller (1793–1865), Austrian : The Cartographer Professor Josef Jüttner and His Wife, oil on wood, ID: 2006.157.1
- Samuel Lovett Waldo (1783–1861), American : Robert G. L. De Peyster, oil on wood, ID: 1942.8.38
- Jacob van Walscapelle (1644–1727), Dutch : Still Life with Fruit, oil on panel, ID: 2001.71.1
- John Ward of Hull (1798–1849), British : The Northern Whale Fishery: The "Swan" and "Isabella", oil on canvas, ID: 2007.114.1
- Susan C. Waters (1823–1900), American : Brothers, oil on canvas, ID: 1956.13.8
- Antoine Watteau (1684–1721), French : The Italian Comedians, oil on canvas, ID: 1946.7.9
- Max Weber (1881–1961), American : Rush Hour, New York, oil on canvas, ID: 1970.6.1
- Jan Baptist Weenix (1621–1661), Dutch : Still Life with Swan and Game before a Country Estate, oil on canvas, ID: 2004.39.1
- J. Alden Weir (1852–1919), American : Moonlight, oil on canvas, ID: 1954.4.1
- Benjamin West (1738–1820), American : Colonel Guy Johnson and Karonghyontye (Captain David Hill), oil on canvas, ID: 1940.1.10
- Rogier van der Weyden (1400–1464), Netherlandish : Saint George and the Dragon, oil on panel, ID: 1966.1.1
- Francis Wheatley (1747–1801), British : Family Group, oil on canvas, ID: 1983.1.43
- W. Wheldon (active 1863), British : The Two Brothers, oil on panel with carved wood relief, ID: 1953.5.39
- James McNeill Whistler (1834–1903), American : Mother of Pearl and Silver: The Andalusian, oil on canvas, ID: 1943.6.1
- Beatrice Whistler (1857–1896), British : Peach Blossom, oil on panel, ID: 1943.11.8
- Worthington Whittredge (1820–1910), American : Second Beach, Newport, oil on canvas, ID: 2004.58.1
- David Wilkie (1785–1841), Scottisch : The Holy Family with Saint Elizabeth and Saint John the Baptist, oil on canvas on wood, ID: 1960.6.42
- Richard Wilson (1713/1714–1782), Welsh : Solitude, oil on canvas, ID: 1983.1.45
- Terry Winters (born 1949), American : Bitumen, oil on linen, ID: 2008.35.1
- Emanuel de Witte (1617–1692), Dutch : The Interior of the Oude Kerk, Amsterdam, oil on canvas, ID: 2004.127.1
- John Wollaston (1672–1749), American : A Gentleman of the Morris Family, oil on canvas, ID: 1942.8.41
- Philips Wouwerman (1619–1668), Dutch : Battle Scene, oil on panel, ID: 2000.159.1
- Joseph Wright of Derby (1734–1797), British : Italian Landscape, oil on canvas, ID: 1983.1.47
- Joachim Wtewael (1566–1638), Dutch : Moses Striking the Rock, oil on panel, ID: 1972.11.1
- Alexander Helwig Wyant (1836–1892), American : Peaceful Valley, oil on canvas, ID: 1965.10.1
- Andrew Wyeth (1917–2009), American : Wind from the Sea, tempera on hardboard, ID: 2009.13.1

== Z ==
- Amzi Emmons Zeliff (1831–1915), American : The Barnyard, oil on canvas, ID: 1955.11.1
- Johann Zoffany (1733–1810), British : The Lavie Children, oil on canvas, ID: 1983.1.48
- Marguerite Zorach (1887–1968), American : Christmas Mail, oil on canvas, ID: 1974.13.1
- Ignacio Zuloaga (1870–1945), Spanish : Achieta, oil on canvas, ID: 1963.10.231
- Francisco de Zurbarán (1598–1664), Spanish : Saint Lucy, oil on canvas, ID: 1943.7.11
