= John Rasmussen =

John Rasmussen may refer to:

- John Rasmussen (painter), one of the Pennsylvania Almshouse Painters
- John Rasmussen (professor) (born 1963), Danish professor
- John Boye Rasmussen (born 1982), Danish handball player
