= 1854 Bath, Maine, anti-Catholic riot =

Anti-Catholic riot

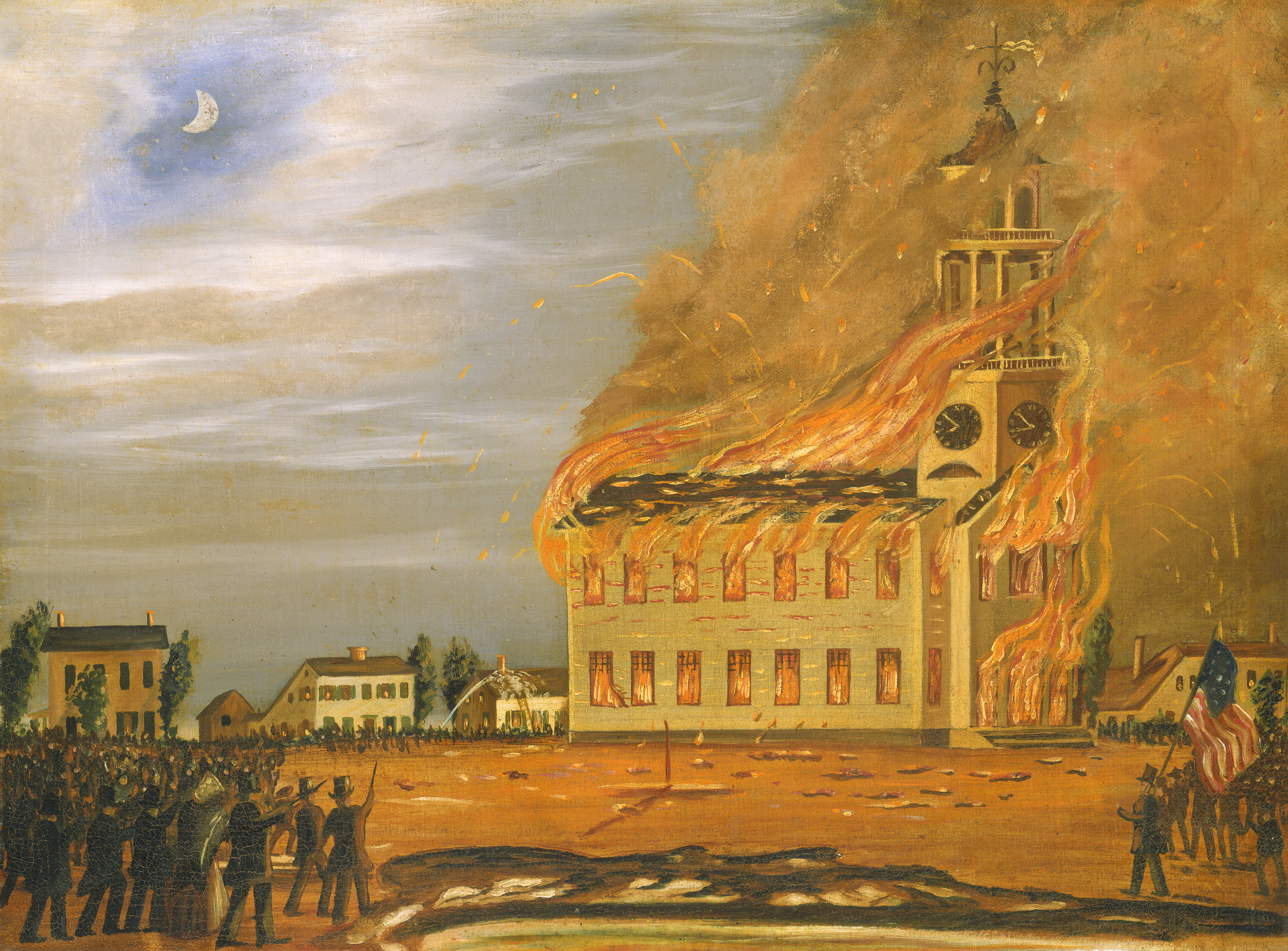
"Burning of Old South Church, Bath, Maine" by John Hilling, c. 1854

The anti-Catholic riot that occurred in Bath on July 6, 1854, was one of several anti-Catholic incidents that took place in coastal Maine in the 1850s.

The first and most violent anti-Catholic riot in Maine took place in Bangor, Maine, in 1834. The resurgence of violence in the 1850s was associated with the rise of the nativist Know Nothing Party and the passage of the Maine law, America's first statewide prohibition ordinance. In addition to the Bath riot in 1854, Catholic priest, Father John Bapst was tarred and feathered in the town of Ellsworth that same year.

The Bath mob was gathered and inflamed by a traveling street-preacher named John S. Orr, who called himself "The Angel Gabriel," dressed in white robes, and carried a trumpet. As Orr delivered an anti-Catholic sermon on Commercial Street, the crowd of spectators grew, eventually swelling to over a thousand and blocking carriage traffic. Some began shouting for the mob to move on the Old South Church, a structure built by Congregationalists in 1805 but recently abandoned by that denomination and purchased by Irish Catholics. In the late afternoon, the crowd marched to the church, began smashing up the pews, hoisted an American flag from the belfry, rang the bell, and set the building on fire. After the church was burned, a smaller crowd of at least a hundred roamed through the streets all night. There is no record of attacks upon any Catholic persons. The event was visually recorded at the time in a series of three history paintings by local artist John Hilling.

A year after the riot, on November 18, 1855, the Bishop of Portland attempted to lay the cornerstone for a new church on the same site, but the congregation was chased away and beaten.
