= Marek Sierka =

Theoretical chemist (born 1971)

- Born: 1971 (age 54–55)
- Education: Jagiellonian University
- Occupation: Theoretical chemist

Marek Sierka (born 1971) is a theoretical chemist, Professor of Computational Materials Science at the Otto Schott Institute of Materials Research at the Friedrich Schiller University Jena.

== Biography ==
He studied chemistry and physics at the Jagiellonian University (1991–1994), the University of Bergen (1994–1995) and the Humboldt University of Berlin (1995–1996). In June 1996 he graduated with a Master of Science degree in chemistry from the Jagiellonian University. In November 2000 he obtained a doctorate in chemistry (summa cum laude) from the Humboldt University of Berlin, under the supervision of Joachim Sauer. In June 2009 he obtained habilitation in theoretical chemistry from the Humboldt University of Berlin. In October 2009 he was appointed as lecturer at the Humboldt University of Berlin. In September 2011 he was a visiting professor at the Italian Institute of Technology at the National Nanotechnology Laboratories in Lecce. In 2012 he was appointed Professor of Computational Materials Science at the Otto Schott Institute of Materials Research at the Friedrich Schiller University Jena. Between 2016 and 2017 he was a lecturer at the Jagiellonian University.

His fields of interest include modeling and atomistic simulations, structure, properties and reactivity of low-dimensional systems (clusters, nanoparticles, thin layers, surfaces) as well as methods for global structural optimization and design of functional materials. Since 2017 he has been a member of the editorial board of Materials. He was elected a member of the Gesellschaft Deutscher Chemiker e.V. (GDCh) and the Arbeitsgemeinschaft für Theoretische Chemie (AGTC).
