= John Toole =

John Toole may refer to:

- John Toole (artist) (1815–1860), Irish-American portrait painter
- John Lawrence Toole (1832–1906), English comic actor
- John Kennedy Toole (1937–1969), American novelist
- John R. Toole (1849–1916), industrialist and legislator in Montana
