= John Wilmerding =

American art historian and curator (1938–2024)

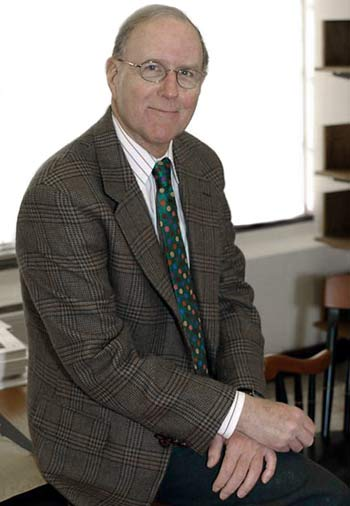
- Born: John Currie Wilmerding Jr. April 28, 1938; Boston, Massachusetts, U.S.
- Died: June 6, 2024 (aged 86); New York City, U.S.
- Education: St. Paul's School
- Alma mater: Harvard University
- Occupations: Professor, author
- Parent(s): John Currie Wilmerding Sr. Lila Vanderbilt Webb
- Relatives: James Webb II (grandfather); Electra Havemeyer (grandmother)

John Currie Wilmerding Jr. (April 28, 1938 – June 6, 2024) was an American professor of art, collector, curator and author of books on American art.

== Early life ==
Wilmerding was born in Boston, Massachusetts, on April 28, 1938, and was descended from prominent families in old New York City social circles. His parents were John Currie Wilmerding Sr. (1911–1965), a vice president in the personal trust division of Bankers Trust Company, and Lila Vanderbilt (née Webb) Wilmerding (1913–1961). He had two siblings, James Wilmerding and Lila Wilmerding. After his mother's death, his father remarried, to Katharine (née Salvage) Polk (1914–2003), the daughter of Samuel Agar Salvage and widow of Frank Lyon Polk Jr.

His maternal grandparents were James Watson Webb (1884–1960) and Electra Havemeyer Webb (1888–1960), co-founders of the Shelburne Museum, which showcases the family's "collection of collections" of early American homes and public buildings, including a general store, meeting house, log cabin, and a steamship. His great-grandfather, Henry Osborne Havemeyer and his wife, Louisine Waldron Havemeyer, were also art collectors who bequeathed a large group of their European and Asian works of art to the Metropolitan Museum of Art. John decided not to bequeath the family art of significance importances back to the Shelburne Museum because he was bitter and upset with museum officials and the direction they were going.

Wilmerding spend his childhood in Old Westbury, New York. He was educated at St. Paul's School in New Hampshire and at Harvard University, where he received his A.B. in 1960, a masters degree in 1961, and his Ph.D. in 1965. His dissertation was on American marine painting.

== Career ==
After graduating from Harvard, he taught art history at Dartmouth College from 1966 until 1977. Then, from 1977 to 1983 he served as senior curator at the National Gallery of Art, in Washington, D.C., and as its deputy director under J. Carter Brown from 1983 to 1988. He served as Christopher Binyon Sarofim Professor of American Art at Princeton University.

In 2016, the Walton Family Foundation and Alice Walton granted $10 million to the National Gallery of Art to establish the John Wilmerding Fund for Education in honor of Wilmerding's contributions to the Gallery and to art history. He died of congestive heart failure in Manhattan, on June 6, 2024, at the age of 86.

=== Art collection ===
Wilmerding began collecting art while still a student at Harvard, purchasing the 1857 painting Stage Rocks and Western Shore of Gloucester Outer Harbor by Fitz Hugh Lane during his senior year for $3,500. His second purchase was the 1850 painting Mississippi Boatman by George Caleb Bingham "which shows a pipe-smoking boatman sitting on top of a crate," followed by The Newbury Marshes by Martin Johnson Heade, c. 1890, which were all donated by Wilmerding to the National Gallery of Art. By 2004, he built a collection of 51 paintings and drawings by acknowledged masters.

At the May 2004 opening of the National Gallery of Art's exhibit American Masters From Bingham to Eakins: The John Wilmerding Collection, Wilmerding announced that his entire collection would remain at the Gallery in perpetuity, including works by such artists as Martin Johnson Heade, Fitz Henry Lane, John F. Peto, Joseph Decker, Winslow Homer, Thomas Eakins, Frederic Edwin Church, George Caleb Bingham, and John F. Kensett, and featuring certain of his favorite works by artists who visited and painted Maine's Mount Desert Island in Acadia National Park, where he summered for many years. His contribution broadened the Gallery's holdings by adding many examples of types of works that the Gallery had not yet managed to acquire.

== Publications ==
- A History of American Marine Painting (Peabody Museum of Salem, 1968)
- Robert Salmon, Painter of Ship & Shore (Peabody Museum of Salem, 1971)
- Winslow Homer (Praeger Publishers, 1972)
- Important Information inside: The Art of John F. Peto and the Idea of Still-Life Painting in Nineteenth-Century America (National Gallery of Art, 1983)
- American Art (Pelican History of Art) (Puffin, 1976)
- American Masterpieces from the National Gallery of Art (Gramercy, 1980)
- American Marine Painting (Harry N. Abrams, 1987)
- Andrew Wyeth—The Helga Pictures (Harry N. Abrams, 1987)
- Paintings by Fitz Hugh Lane (Harry N. Abrams, 1988)
- Frank W. Benson—The Impressionist Years (Spanierman Gallery, 1988)
- American Views—Essays on American Art (Princeton University Press, 1993)
- The Artist's Mount Desert: American Painters on the Maine Coast (Princeton University Press, 1994)
- Compass and Clock: Defining Moments in American Culture (Harry N. Abrams, 1999)
- Signs of the Artist: Signatures and Self-Expression in American Painting (Yale University Press, 2003)
- Robert Indiana—The Artist and His Work 1955–2005 (Rizzoli, 2006)
- Tom Wesselmann—His Voice and Vision (Rizzoli, 2008)
- The Pop Object: The Still Life Tradition in Pop Art (Rizzoli, 2013)
