= John Rasmussen (professor) =

Professor of biomechanics at Aalborg University

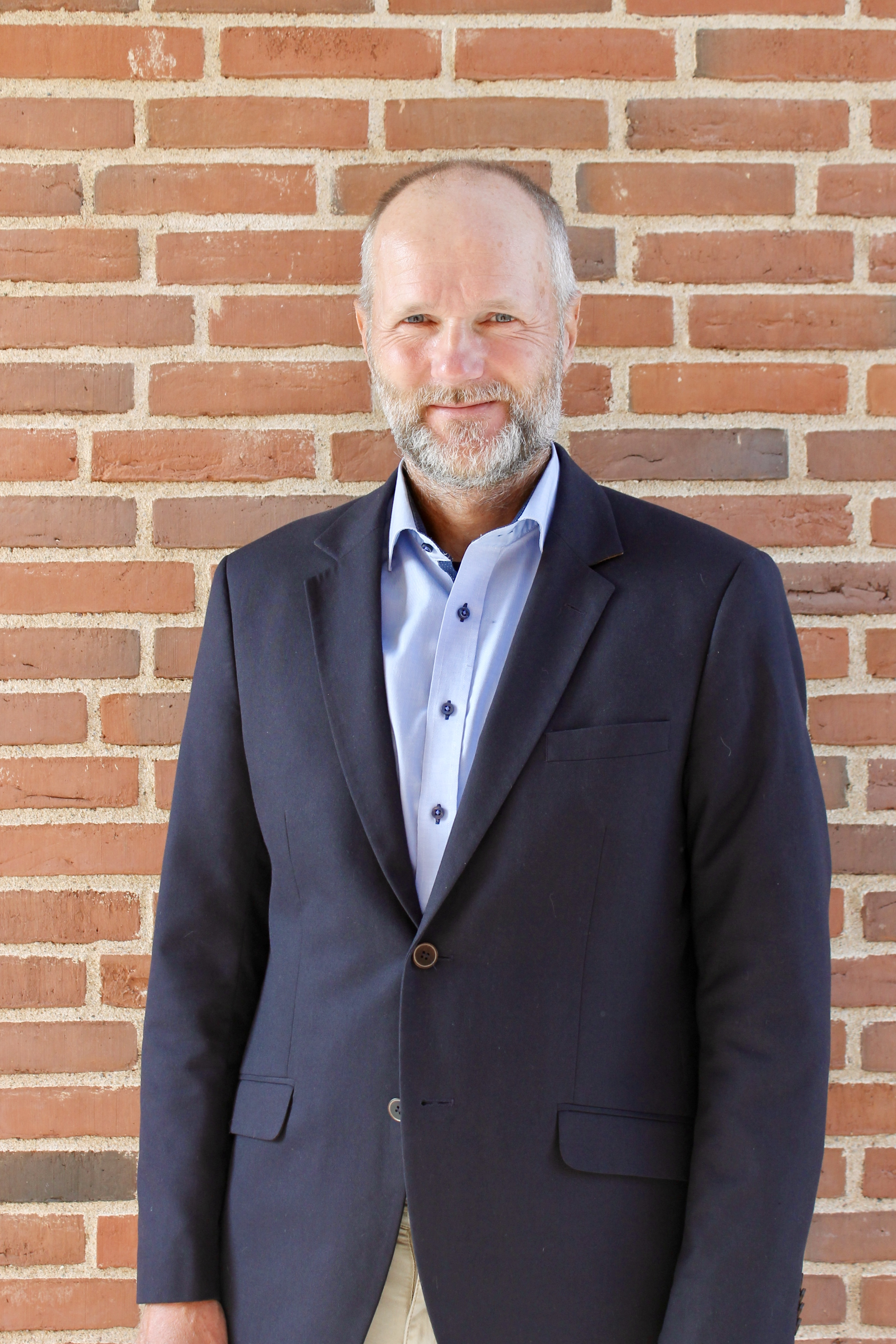
- Portrait of John Rasmussen
- Born: March 31, 1963 (age 63); Aalborg, Denmark
- Citizenship: Denmark
- Education: Ms.c. & PhD from Aalborg University
- Occupations: Professor of biomechanics at Aalborg University and Chief Technology Officer at AnyBody Technology A/S
- Employer: Aalborg University

John Rasmussen is a professor of biomechanics at Aalborg University. His research is aimed both at solid mechanics, biomechanics, biomedical engineering and sports engineering.

== Education and research ==
John Rasmussen was educated at Aalborg University, where he graduated as MA in 1986, and three years later received his PhD in computer-aided engineering. In addition to his academic work, John Rasmussen acted as chief executive officer at AnyBody Technology A/S from 2001 to 2008 and subsequently became the CTO of the same company. Furthermore, Rasmussen publishes research on a personal blog.

Rasmussen's research has influenced the theoretical field of structural optimisation in the late 1980s by applying the finite element method as the engine of his research, thus enabling optimisation of practical structures rather than conducting academic examples.

In the late 1990s, he formed the AnyBody Research Project at Aalborg University, which he is still a leading part of. One of the goals of his research is to develop methods for analysing the biomechanics of the human body involving bones, joints, muscles and tendons.

His research has contributed to the treatment of osteoarthritis, general disability and the optimisation of sports performances. Furthermore, John Rasmussen has initiated a new branch of interdisciplinary biomechanics in cooperation with Aalborg University’s Laboratory for Stem Cell Research in the aetiology of pressure ulcers, which has led to new results in tissue engineering.
