= Eugène Lawrence Vail =

French painter

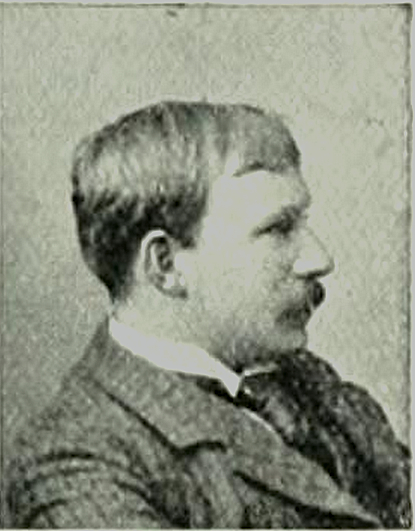
Eugène Lawrence Vail (before 1900)

Eugène Lawrence Vail or simply Eugène Vail (29 September 1857, in Saint-Servan – 25 December 1934, in Paris), was a French American painter; best known for his works of village scenes in the Impressionistic style.

== Biography ==
His mother was Bretonne and his father was from the United States. When he completed his primary education, at the insistence of his father, he studied engineering at the Stevens Institute of Technology in Hoboken, New Jersey. While at Stevens, he became a founding Father of Gamma chapter of the Theta Xi fraternity. After graduating, he enlisted in the Army National Guard and participated in the scientific expedition led by Captain George Wheeler as a cartographer, helping to produce what became known as the Wheeler Survey. Upon his return in 1879, he joined the Art Students League and pursued his true interest in art, studying in the workshops of William Merritt Chase and James Carroll Beckwith.

When he went back to France, he entered the Académie Julian, followed by the École des beaux-arts de Paris, where he studied with Alexandre Cabanel, Pascal Dagnan-Bouveret and Raphaël Collin. For several years, he frequented the art colonies at Pont Aven and Concarneau, to hone his skills. He was awarded a gold medal at the Exposition Universelle (1889)

In 1890, he moved to Étaples, where he made the acquaintance of Henri Le Sidaner and influenced his work. He held frequent showings at the gallery of Georges Petit; notably in 1900, when he exhibited with several other artists who belonged to the "Société nouvelle de peintres et de sculpteurs". A major solo exhibition was held there in 1921, followed by a showing at the Salon des Tuileries in 1923. He also exhibited internationally, throughout Northern Europe, as well as at the Louisiana Purchase Exposition.

His work became more impressionistic in his later years, perhaps as a result of spending his autumns in Italy. In 1935, the Société nationale des beaux-arts held a retrospective in his honor. At the beginning of World War II his widow, Gertrude, brought his remaining works to the United States, where they were widely shown before being distributed to various museums. His works may be seen at the Brooklyn Museum, the National Gallery of Art, the Smithsonian American Art Museum, the Louvre and several museums in Brittany.

== Selected paintings ==
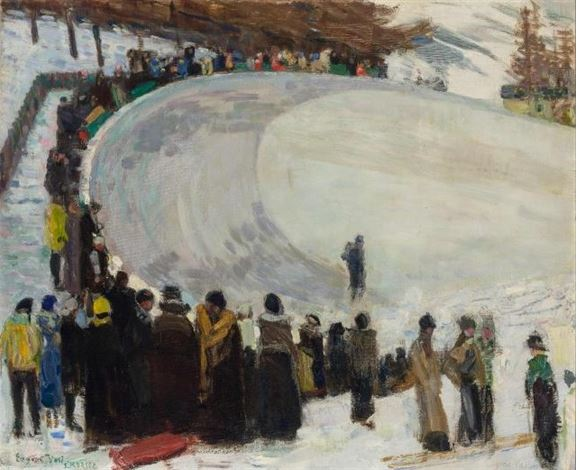
St. Moritz, a Sunny Corner

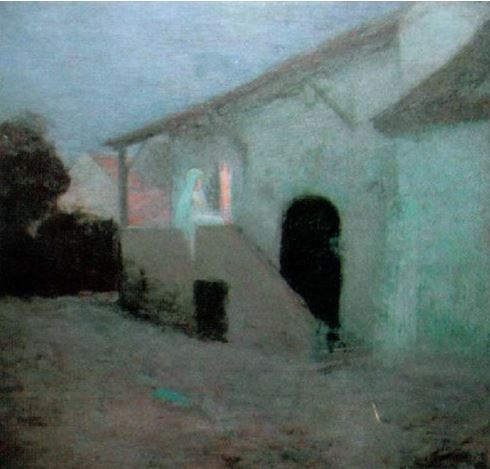
Symbolist Vision

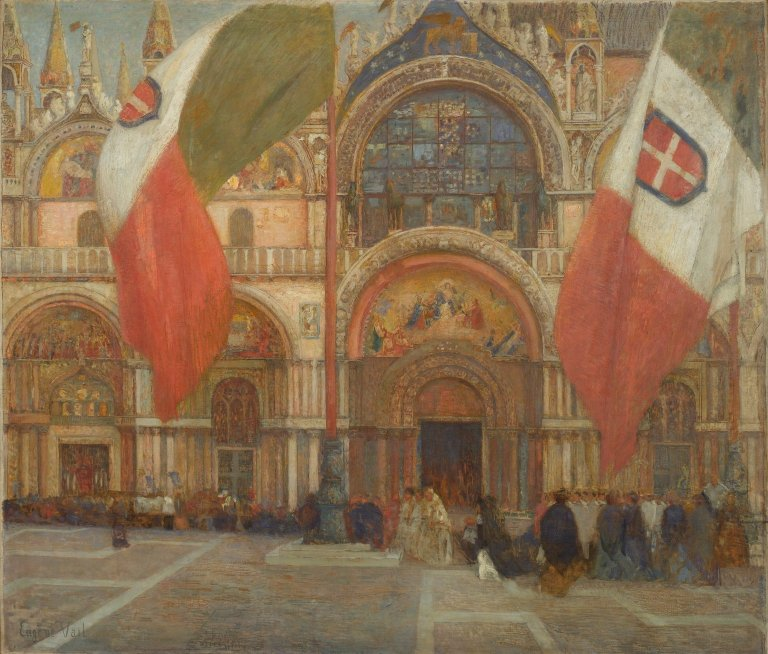
The Flags, Saint Mark's Basilica - Fête Day

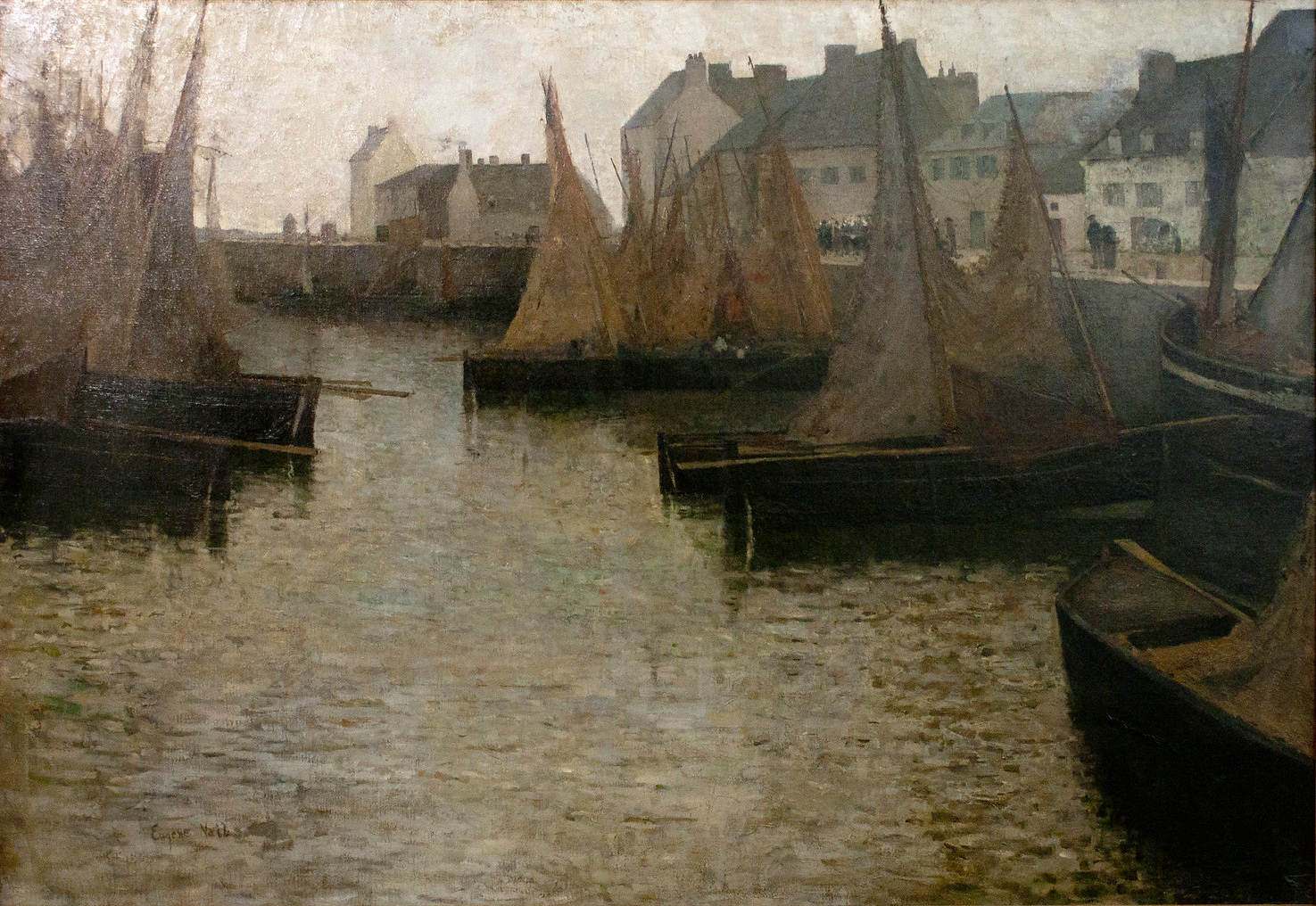
Ships at Concarneau

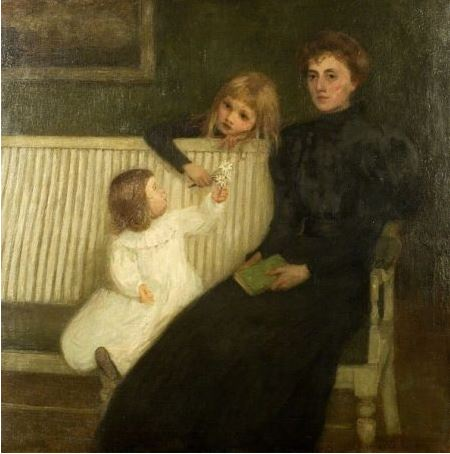
Children With
Their Mother
