= Adam van Breen =

Dutch Golden Age painter

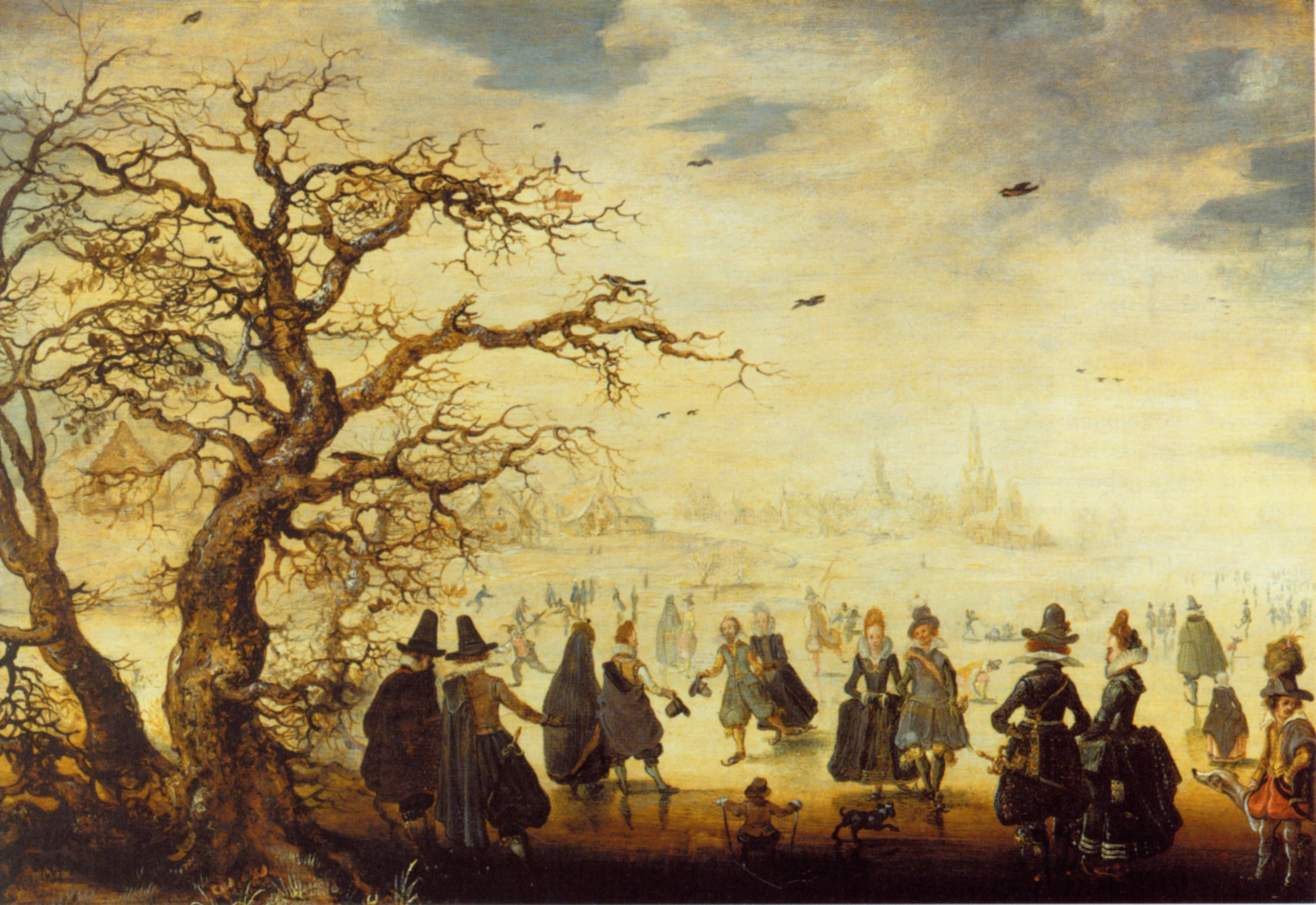
Winter scene

Adam van Breen (1585 – 1642) was a Dutch Golden Age painter.

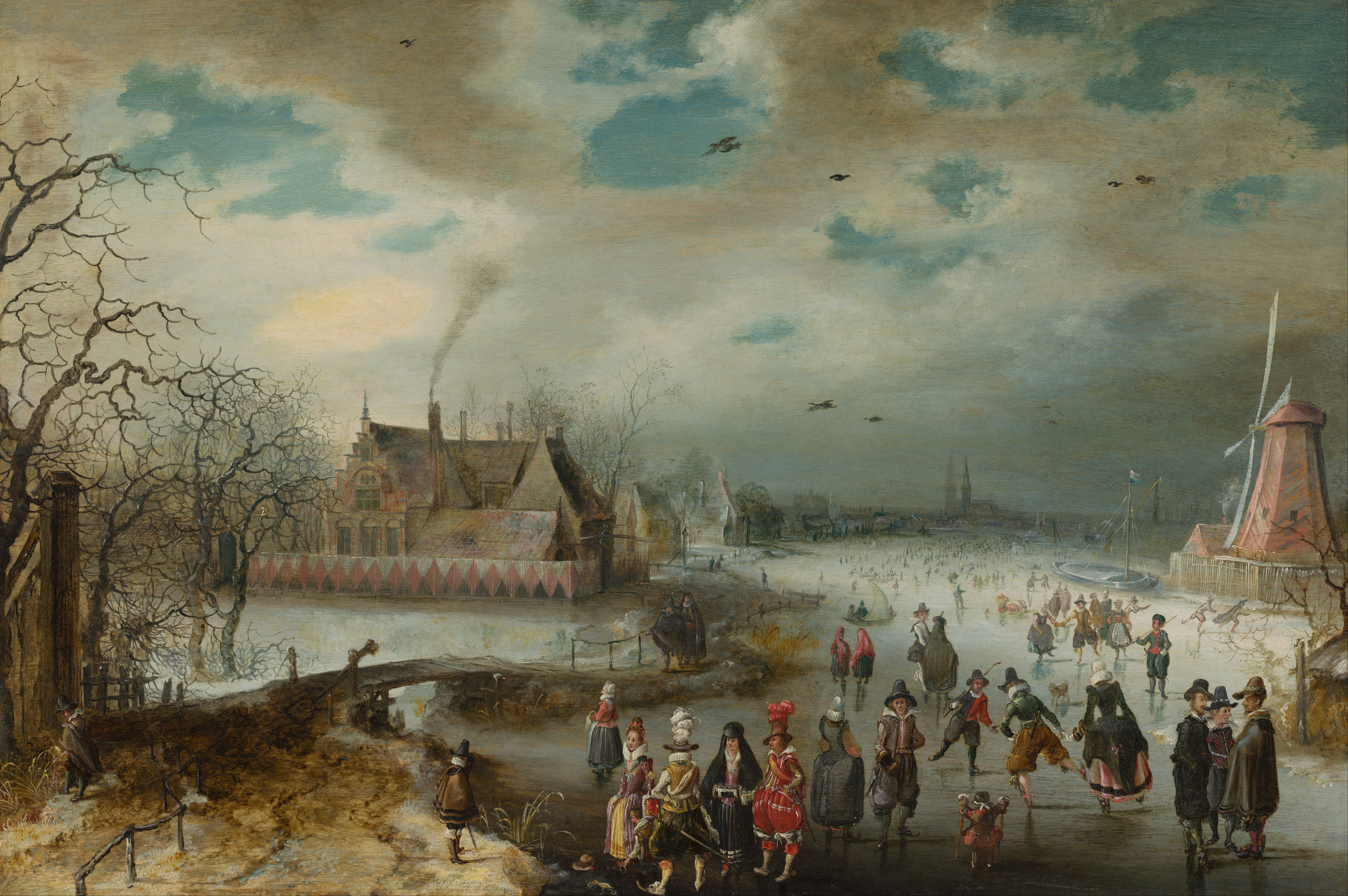
Skating on the Frozen Amstel River (1601)

== Biography ==
He was born in Amsterdam and specialized in winter landscapes. He became a member of the Hague Guild of St. Luke in 1612 and besides the Hague is known to have worked in Amsterdam and Oslo. He died in Norway.
