= Pennsylvania Almshouse Painters =

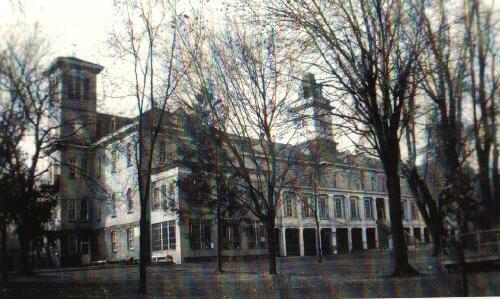
Main building of the Berks County Almshouse (demolished in 1957)

The Pennsylvania Almshouse Painters were three self-taught artists; Charles C. Hofmann, Louis Mader and John Rasmussen, who are almost exclusively known for their paintings of the almshouse in Berks County, Pennsylvania, done in an early folk art style. They were all born in Germany.

== The almshouse ==
The almshouse, located in Cumru Township, Shillington, was originally the property of Governor Thomas Mifflin and was known as Angelica Farm. The first building, a home for the insane, was constructed in 1824. Separate houses for male and female inmates were established in 1832. A modern hospital was added in 1874, devoted to caring for the infirm, sick, disabled, and feeble-minded as well as the insane. A report, prepared in 1885, found that the insane were not receiving adequate care and should be transferred to a state hospital. By the early 20th century, their focus had shifted almost entirely to caring for the infirm and elderly. The outdated complex was demolished in 1957 and part of the land was taken by the local school district.

The almshouse served as the model for the "Diamond County Home for the Aged" in The Poorhouse Fair; a novel by John Updike.

== The painters ==
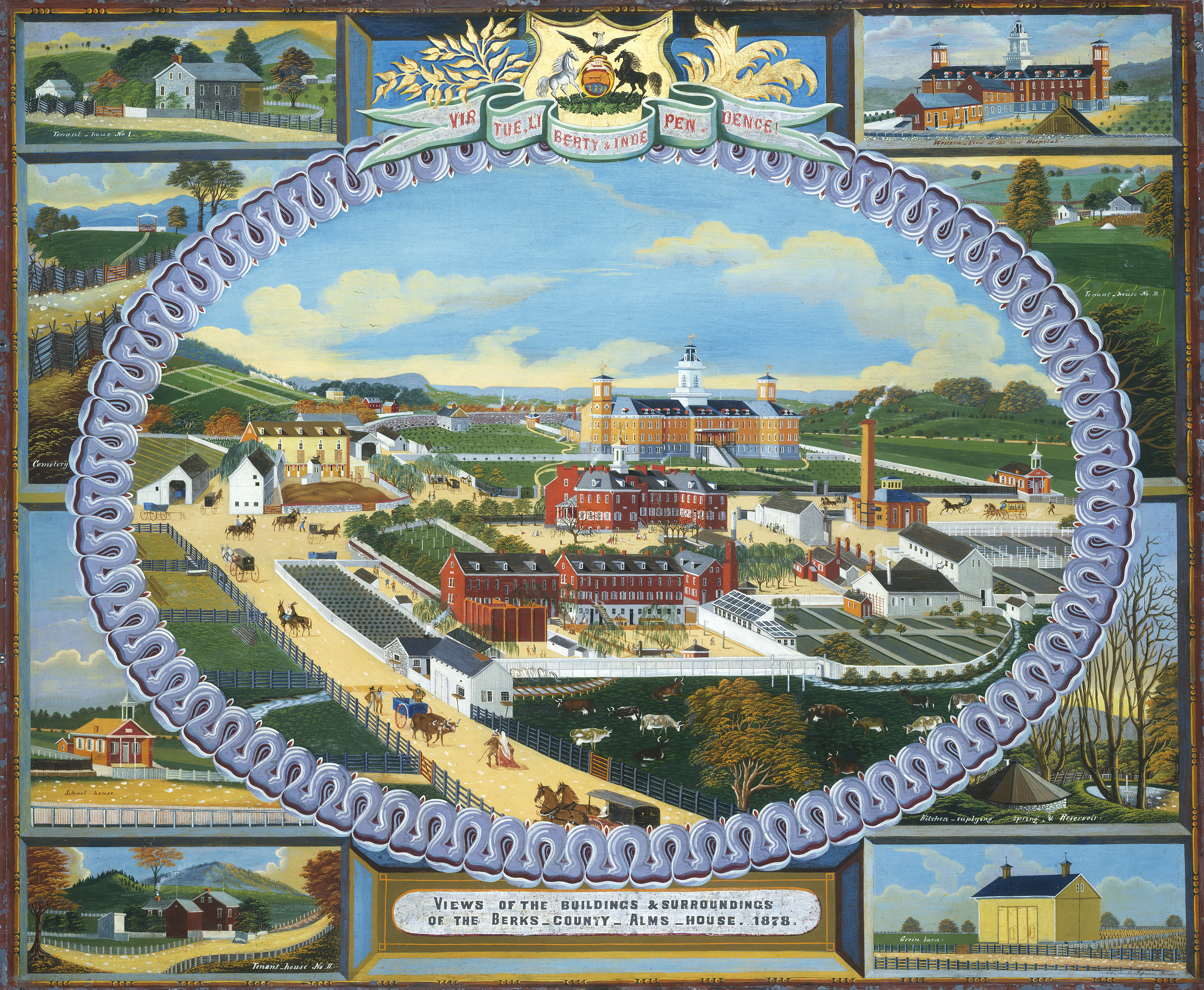
Berks County Almshouse by Hofmann (1878)

=== Charles C. Hofmann ===
Hofmann appears to have spent most of his life in this and similar institutions. He was born c.1820, exact place unknown, and emigrated to the United States in 1860. By 1865, he was living in Reading, Pennsylvania. From then until 1872, he was an itinerant portrait painter along the Schuylkill River.

That year, he was committed to the Berks County Almshouse for vagrancy and "intemperance". While there, he completed two watercolor views and later did eight paintings on canvas and tin. Despite the fact that poorhouses of that time were uniformly dirty and neglected, his paintings are all positive and highly idealized.

There is some evidence he had been trained as a lithographer. In fact, most of his works are circled by vignettes, which was common practice in contemporary lithographs.

He would be intermittently confined to almshouses for drunkenness throughout the remainder of his life. In between, he painted farmscapes and businesses on commission. Many of his paintings feature a bearded man with a bottle; believed to be a self-portrait.

In 1882, he was admitted to the almshouse with a broken arm, died there a few months later of "dropsy", and was buried in the nearby potter's field. Three of his works are held by the National Gallery of Art.

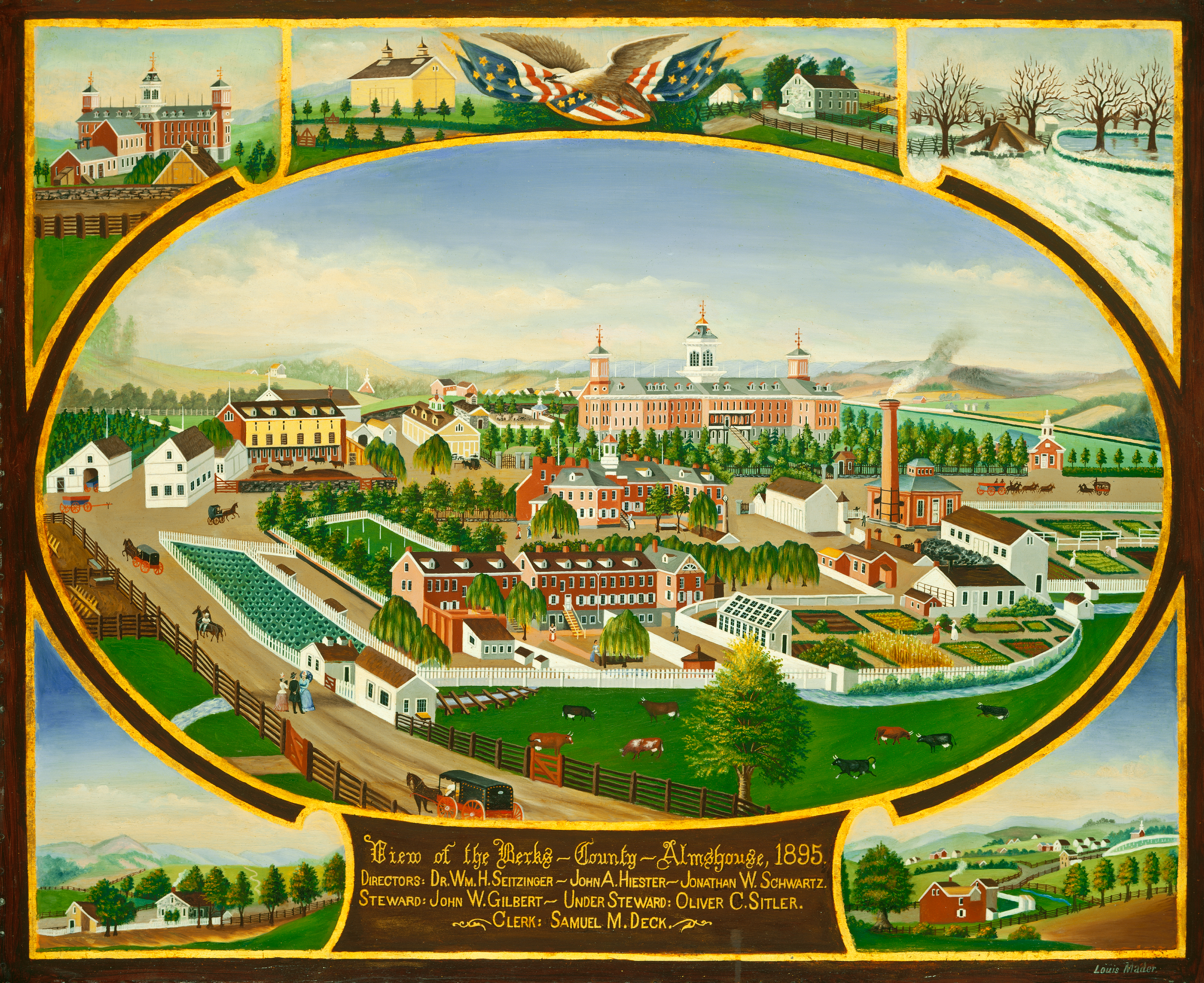
Berks County Almshouse by Mader (1895)

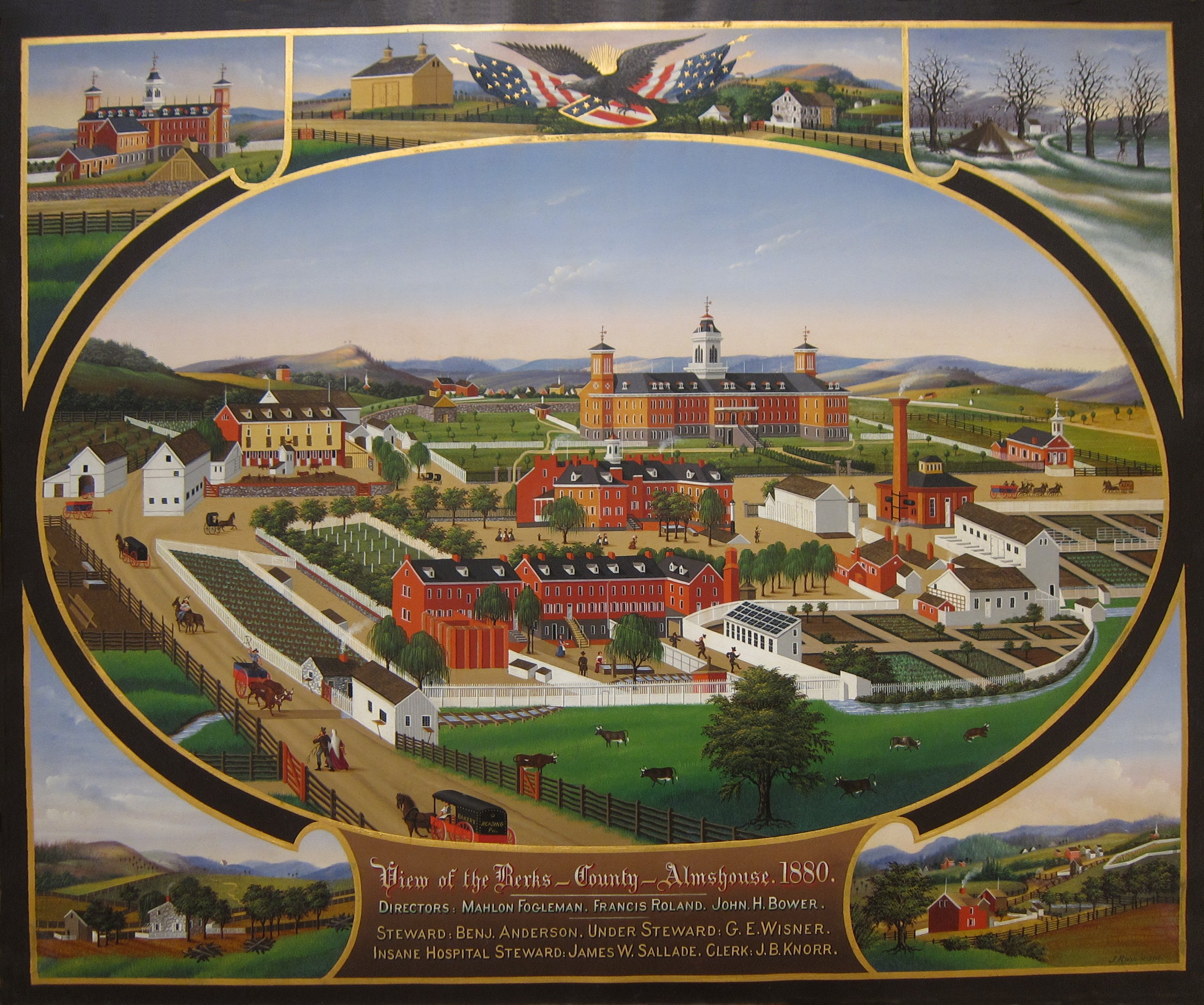
Berks County Almshouse by Rasmussen (1880)

=== Louis Mader ===
Mader was born in 1842 and emigrated to the United States in 1867. He first entered the Berks County Almshouse in 1892 and painted at least eight views of the almshouse during the next three years. He left there in 1899 and there is no further record of him. The only non-almshouse painting attributed to him is a mural in a home in Parkesburg, Pennsylvania.

His aerial view of the almshouse, created in 1895, is in the collection of the National Gallery of Art.

=== John Rasmussen ===
He was born in 1828 and emigrated to the United States in 1865. Like Hofmann, he was originally committed to the almshouse for vagrancy and drunkenness. He would stay from 1879 until his death in 1895. While there, he became a friend of Hofmann and was inspired to do similar paintings. These are his only known works, although the Reading City Directory had listed him as a painter for several years.

Hofmann sold paintings locally. When he died in 1882, Rasmussen began to sell his works to Hofmann's former clients. After his death, he remained virtually unknown until 1968, when the Abby Aldrich Rockefeller Folk Art Museum held a retrospective show of all three Almshouse painters.

His paintings may be seen at the Reading Public Museum and the American Folk Art Museum.
