= Joseph Decker =

American painter

- Born: May, 1853; Kingdom of Württemberg, Germany
- Died: April 1, 1924 (aged 70); Brooklyn, New York, U.S.
- Known for: Painting, Still-life

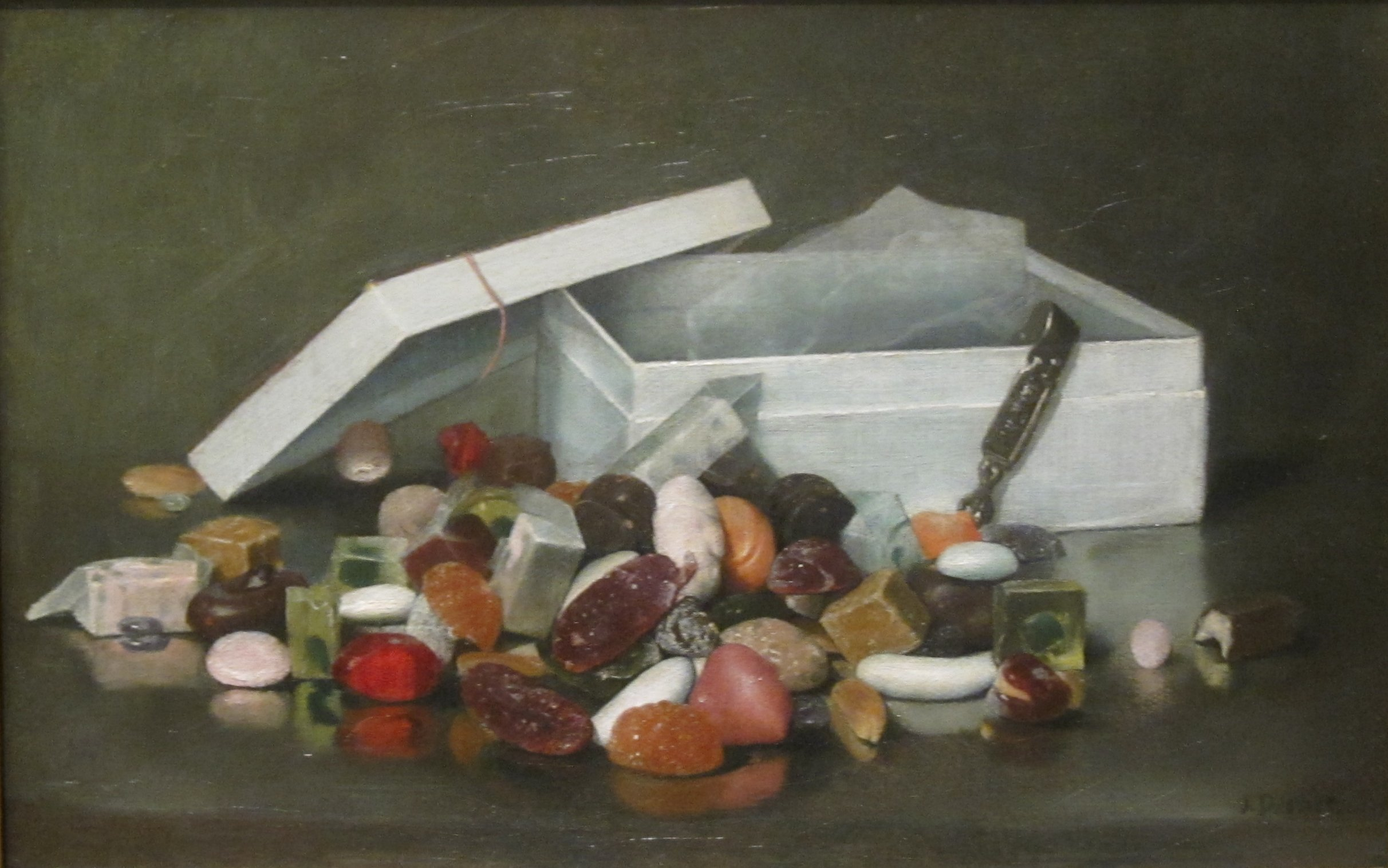
Upset

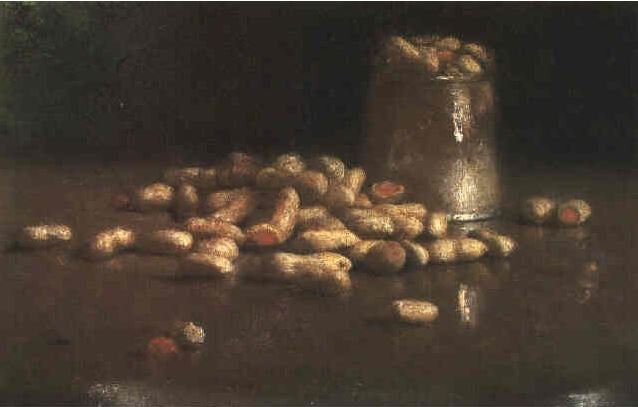
Peanuts with a Pewter Tankard

Joseph Decker (May 1853 – 1 April 1924) was a German-born American painter who specialized in still-lifes. His subjects were mostly of edible, rather than man-made objects.

== Biography ==
He was born in the Kingdom of Württemberg. His father was a carpenter. At the age of fourteen, in 1867, he and his family emigrated to the United States. At first, he was apprenticed to a house painter in Brooklyn, then worked painting signs. By the mid 1870s, he had aspirations to become a serious artist and began taking drawing classes at the National Academy of Design. It is believed that his primary teacher there was John George Brown. In a few years, he was exhibiting portraits and landscapes at the Brooklyn Art Association. He was able to save enough money to travel to Munich in 1879, where he spent a year studying with the history painter, Wilhelm Lindenschmit.

Upon returning, he exhibited at the National Academy, the Brooklyn Art Association, the Society of American Artists, and the Art Institute of Chicago. He established a studio in Manhattan in the mid 1880s. In 1889 he exhibited at the International Industrial Fair in Buffalo. After that, he stopped exhibiting and began to paint landscapes; possibly under the influence of George Inness. At that time, his works also became softer in tone. In addition to still-lifes, he created genre scenes, portraits and novelties which incorporated the shape of the artist's palette, including the finger-hole. Later he worked for the well-known art collector (and his primary patron), Thomas B. Clarke; restoring porcelains.

He had a wife and five children, but spent long periods in Germany by himself. He was, however, fond of animals and included his pet squirrel, Bonnie, in some of his paintings. His last years are mostly undocumented and he died in the charity ward of a Brooklyn hospital in 1924. His work was forgotten until Alfred Frankenstein, the art historian, called attention to it in 1949. William H. Gerdts, also an art historian, has pointed out similarities between some of Decker's paintings and the illustrations on seed packets made in Rochester, New York, at about the same time.

== Paintings & Chronology ==
- Roasting Apples (1868)
- Ripening Pears (1884/1885)
- Green Plums (1885)
- Basket of Peaches (1885)
- The Genius (1885)
- Still Life with Tin Can and Nuts (1886)
- Upset (1887)
- Still Life with Crab Apples and Grapes (1888)
- Grapes (1890/1895)
- Gooseberries (1896)
- Twelve Plums (1896)
- Peanuts with a Pewter Tankard (1900)
- Hammer (1900)
- Boy at the Dentist (?)
- Boy Eating Berries (?)
- Upset (?)
- Still Life of Strawberries and Basket (?)
