= Structural optimization =

Structural optimization refers to the task of optimizing a structure through a set of parameters given some constraints. It may refer to:

- Shape optimization
- Topology optimization
