= John Hilling =

John Hilling (1822 – 14 August 1894) was a British painter who lived and worked in America.

He moved from Britain to America in the 1840s, settling in the town of Bath, Maine. In 1864 he enlisted as a private in the army during the American Civil War, but was invalided out a year later with a spinal injury.

On his return to Bath he made a living as an interior decorator, moving to Charlestown, Massachusetts in 1873, but moving back to Wells, Maine a few years later.

He died in Wells in 1894 and was buried in Bath. He had married twice and had at least 3 children, two of whom died young.

As an artist he is best known for his paintings of the town of Bath, particularly the series of three history paintings based on the burning of the old South Church in Bath by anti-Catholic rioters.

== Selected works ==
- The Old South Church, 1854, oil on canvas, 49 x 70 cm, Barbara L. Gordon Collection
- Looting the Old South Church, 1854, oil on canvas, 44 x 60 cm, Barbara L. Gordon Collection
- Burning of Old South Church, Bath, Maine, 1854, oil on canvas, 44 x 60 cm, ID: 1958.9.7 National Gallery of Art, Washington, USA NGA
