= John Toole (artist) =

American painter

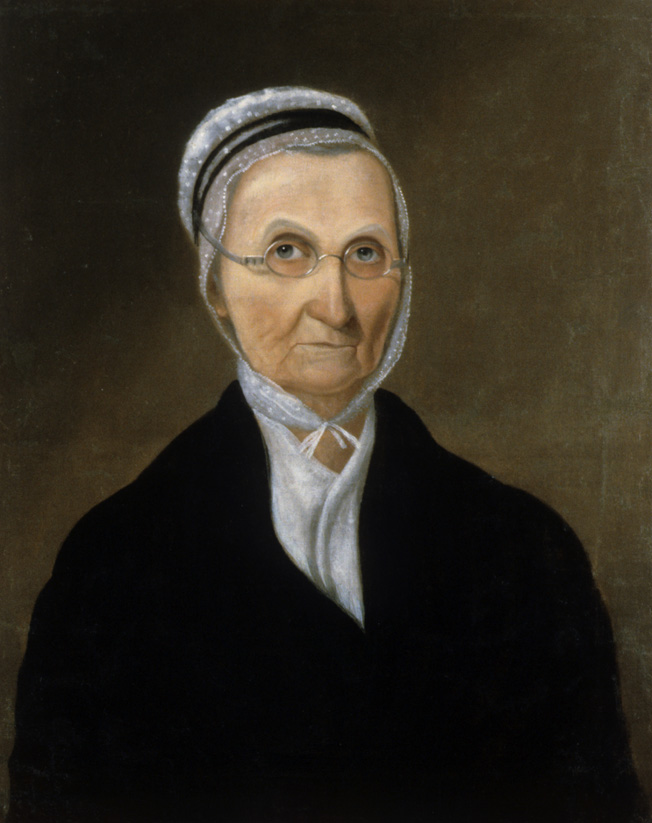
Portrait of Lucy Lewis Marks (1752–1837), mother of Meriwether Lewis

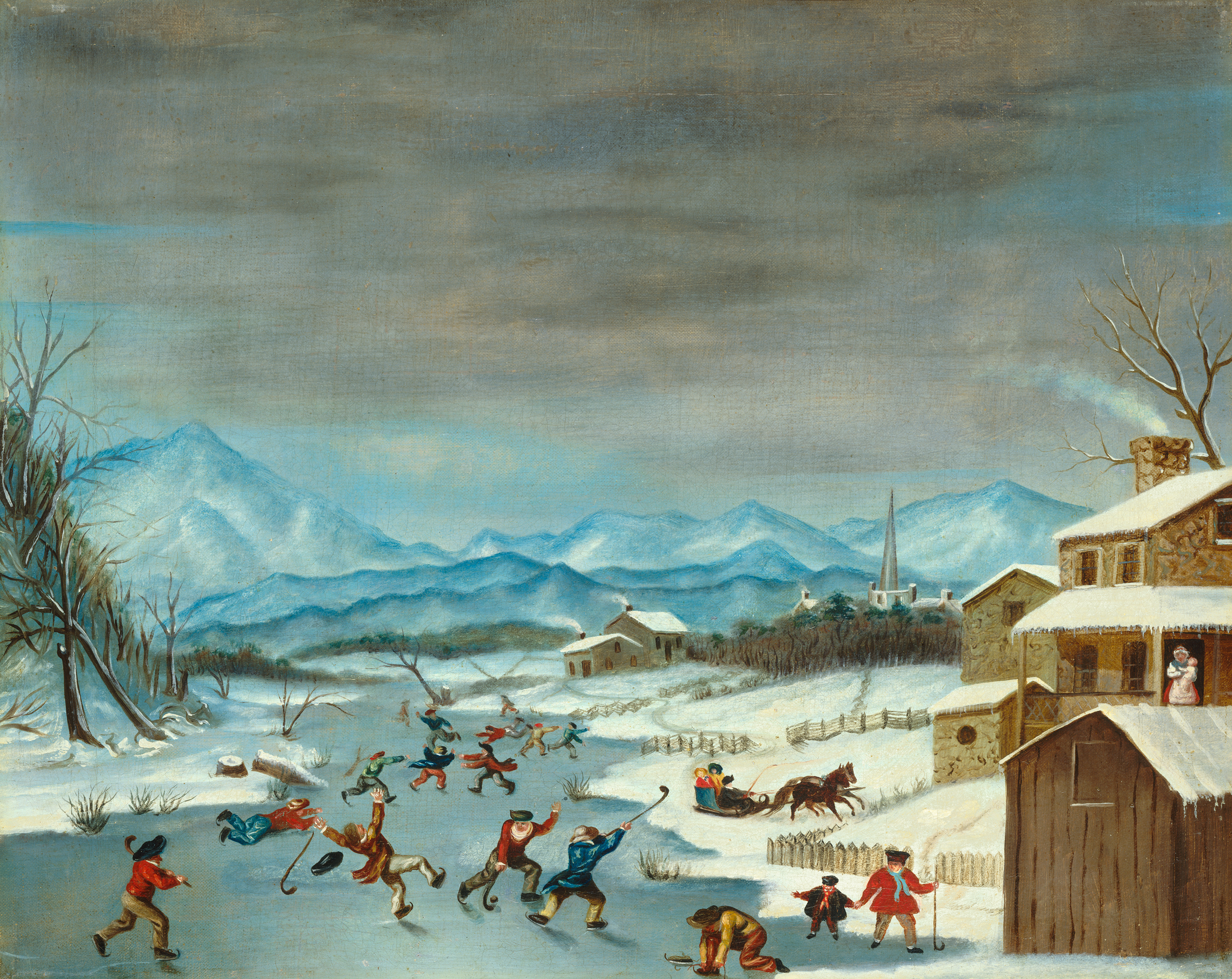
Skating Scene

John Toole, originally O'Toole (26 November 1815, in Dublin – 11 March 1860, in Charlottesville, Virginia) was an Irish-born American artist who worked as an itinerant portrait painter. He also created a few landscapes, to advertise his skills to potential customers.

== Biography ==
His father was a chemistry teacher, who was killed in an explosion when one of his experiments went wrong. As a result, at the age of twelve he, his brother and sister were sent to live with their uncle George, a tailor and cobbler, in the United States.

Little more is known of him until 1836, when he married Mary Jane Suddarth (1817–1902), from a family that was distantly related to Thomas Jefferson. At that time, he was already painting portraits, although he appears to have been working as a pharmacist and tavern keeper. Family tradition has him attending the University of Virginia, but he does not appear in their records. It is obvious from his numerous letters, however, that he was well-educated. Many include quotes from the Latin. His art education, as far as is known, consisted entirely of observation and copying magazine illustrations. He is also known to have owned a copy of Méthode pour apprendre à dessiner les passions (Method for Learning to Draw Passions) by Charles Le Brun, as well as a French grammar and a volume of Voltaire's plays. In addition, he collected engravings of works by the Old Masters.

In 1857, when daguerreotypes were becoming increasingly popular, he entered into a partnership with George W. Minnis (1819–1877) of Petersburg, who would later become one of Robert E. Lee's personal photographers. Toole created his portraits from Minnis' photographs, thus eliminating the need for his subjects to sit for long periods. By the time of his death in 1860, from tuberculosis, that selling point had become ineffective.

He produced well over 100 portraits, all but a handful of which are still privately held by their respective families. Some may be seen at the National Gallery of Art, the Fralin Museum of Art at the University of Virginia, and the Virginia Historical Society.
