= Dirck Helmbreker =

Painter from the Northern Netherlands (1633–1696)

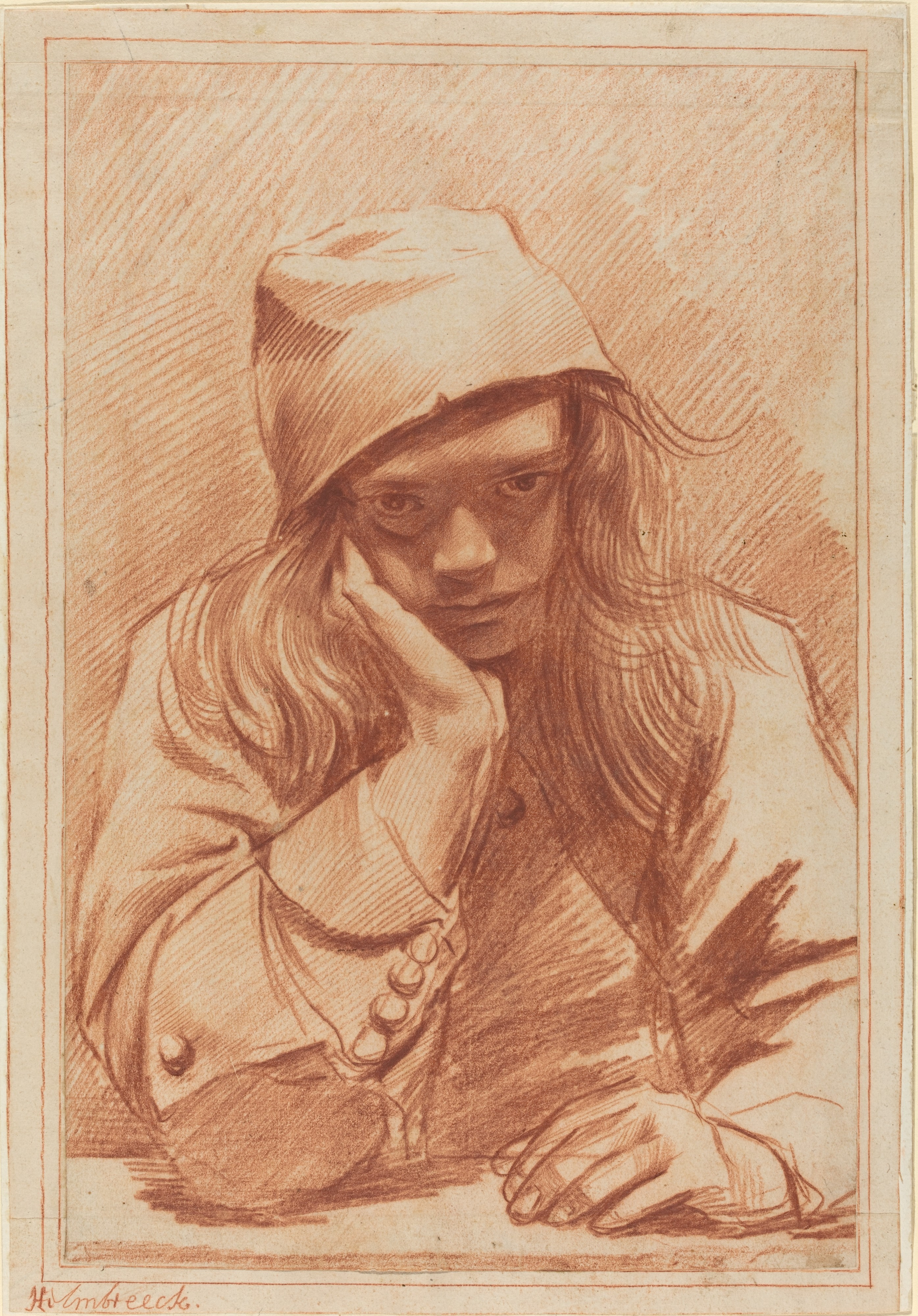
- Selfportrait.
- Born: Dirck Helmbreker; 1633; Haarlem
- Died: 1696 (aged 62–63); Rome
- Known for: Painting
- Movement: Baroque

Dirck Helmbreker, Theodor Helmbreeker, or Teodoro Elembrech (1633–1696) was a Dutch Golden Age painter of Italianate landscapes.

== Biography ==
According to Houbraken he lived from 1624 to 1694, but this has since been proven to be incorrect. He was born in Haarlem and became a pupil of Pieter de Grebber. He traveled to Rome at a young age, where he remained until his death. His paintings belong to the group of artists known as the Bamboccianti, or, as Houbraken writes, Bamboots, which is a specialization by Northern artists in small-scale genre scenes in the manner of Pieter van Laer while in Rome. Helmbreker arrived in Italy in 1654, eventually settling in Rome by the end of the decade. At the end of the 1670s he and the Flemish painter Willem Reuter were members of a group known as the 'Congregazione dei Virtuosi al Pantheon'. The Congregazione counted among its members many important artists who left their mark in Rome.

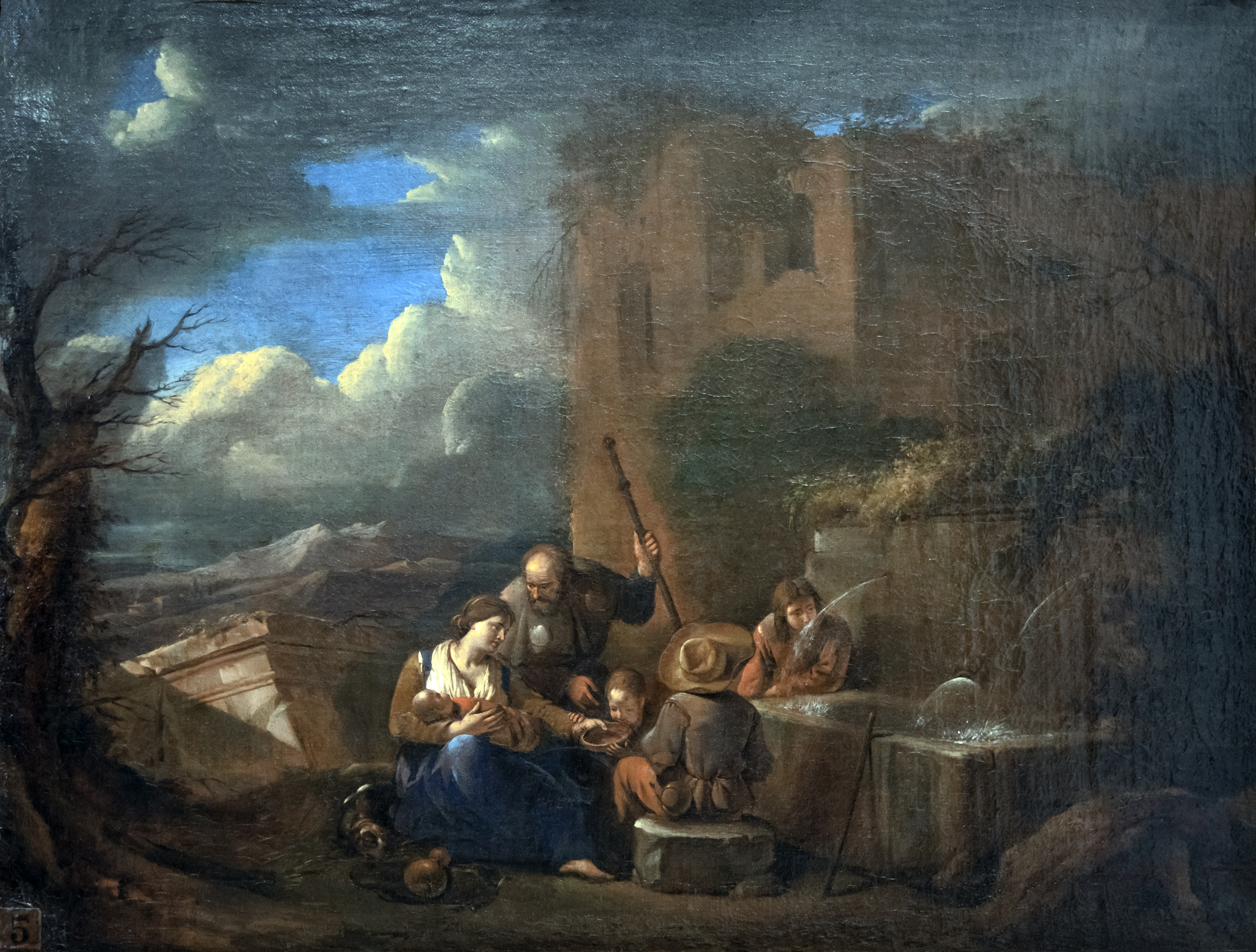
Pilgrims near a fountain 1670

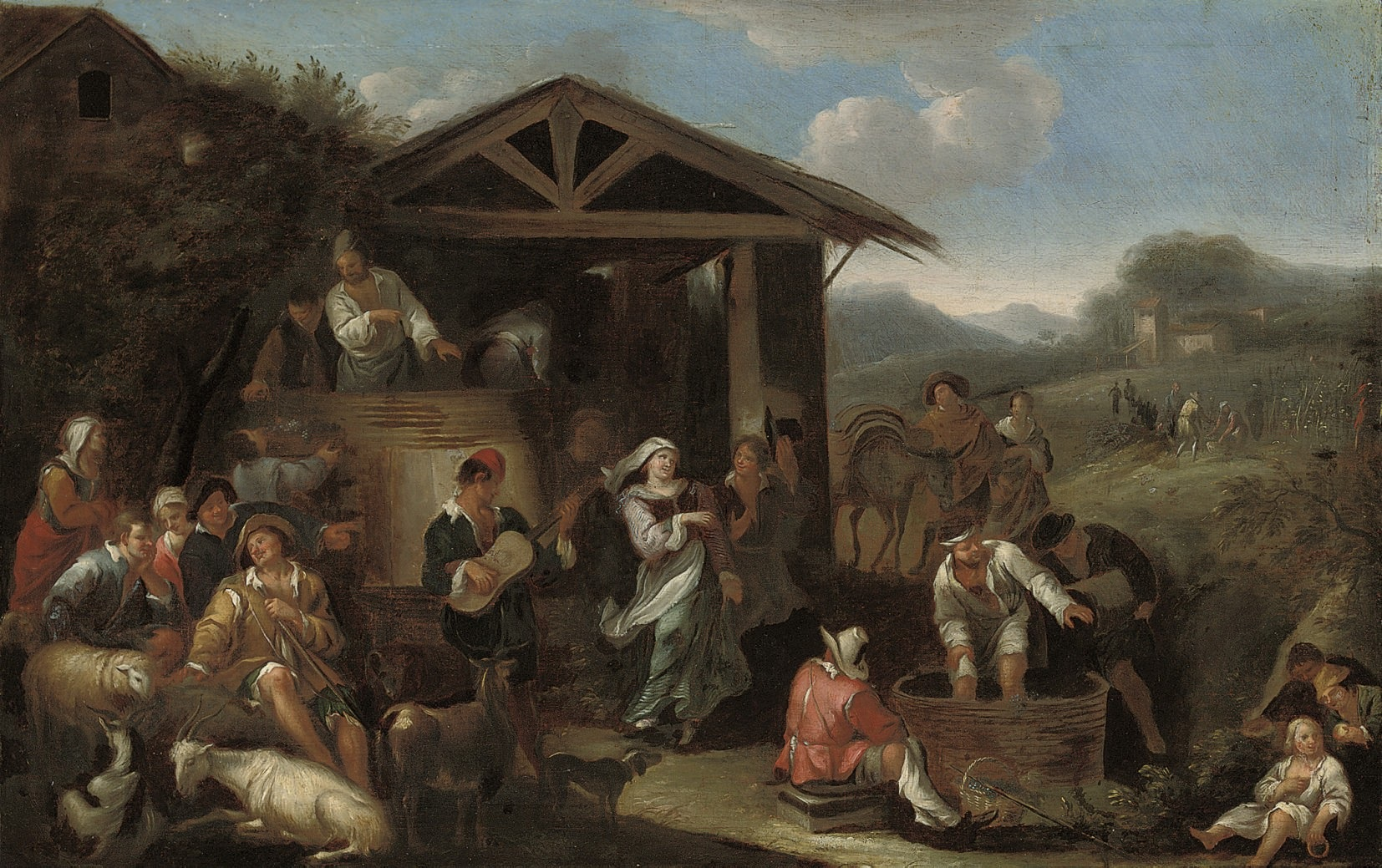
An Italianate landscape with peasants making merry and pressing grapes

== Works ==
He was influenced by Sébastien Bourdon. His genre scenes, which were among the last generation of the Bamboccianti, tended to be more classical in inspiration than many their earlier low-life scenes. Ultimately, these works found great success with Italian collectors. In 1695 he was commissioned to paint the main altar piece of the Church of St. Julian of the Flemings in Rome.

Houbraken described a painting from 1681 in the possession of Pieter Klok showing an Italian monastery with a group of poor people in the foreground with various handicaps being given soup from a large kettle ladled by a Franciscan friar. Helmbreker was very religious and donated often to the poor of Rome.

== Bibliography ==
- Laura Laureati, "Helmbreker [Elembrech; Helmbreecker], Dirck [Teodoro; Theodoor; Theodor]," Grove Art Online. Oxford University Press, [October 29, 2007].
- Slive, Seymour (1995). Dutch Painting 1600-1800. New Haven: Yale University Press - Pelican history of Art. ISBN 0-300-06418-7.
