= Michiel Sweerts =

Flemish painter and printmaker (1618–1664)

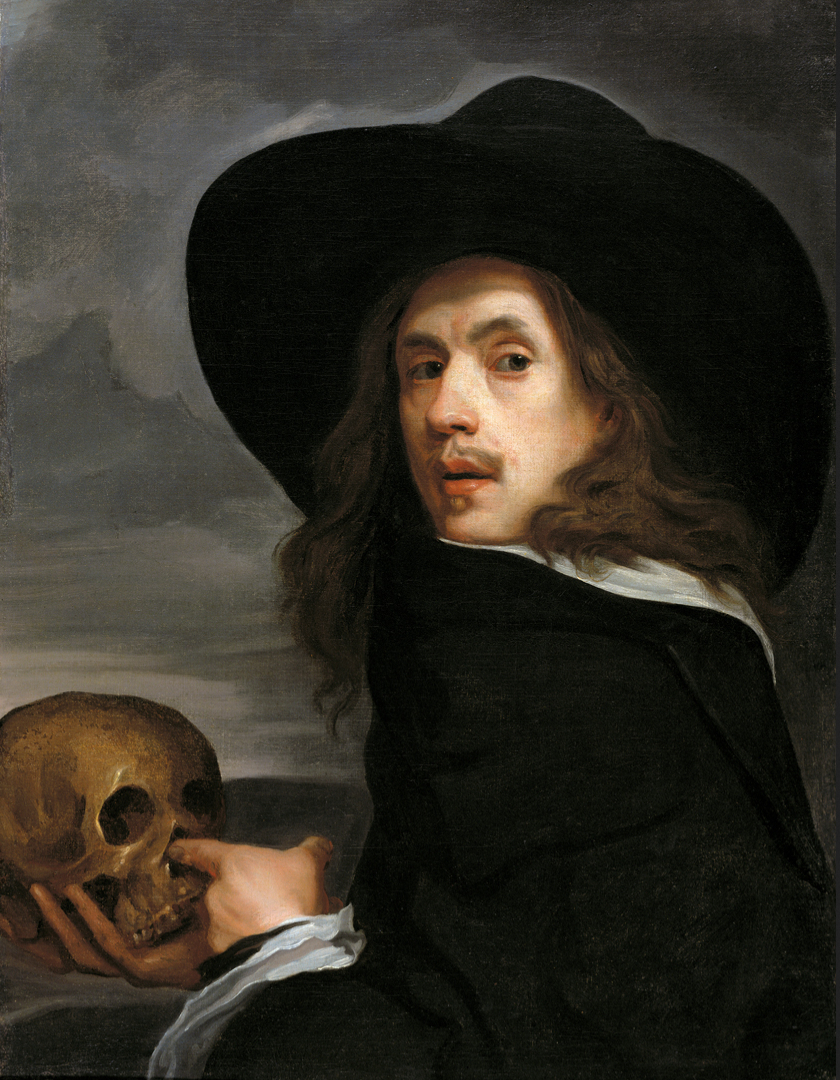
- Self-portrait, c. 1660
- Born: 29 September 1618; Brussels
- Died: 1 June 1664 (aged 45); Goa
- Known for: Painting
- Movement: Baroque

Michiel Sweerts or Michael Sweerts (29 September 1618 – 1 June 1664) was a Flemish painter and printmaker of the Baroque period, who is known for his allegorical and genre paintings, portraits and tronies. The artist led an itinerant life and worked in Rome, Brussels, Amsterdam, Persia and India (Goa).

While in Rome Sweerts became linked to the group of Dutch and Flemish painters of low-life scenes known as the Bamboccianti. Sweerts' contributions to the Bamboccianti genre display generally greater stylistic mastery and social-philosophical sensitivity than the other artists working in this manner. While he was successful during his lifetime, Sweerts and his work fell into obscurity until he was rediscovered in the 20th century as one of the most intriguing and enigmatic artists of his time.

== Life ==
=== Early life and stay in Rome ===
Michiel Sweerts was born in Brussels where he was baptized on 29 September 1618 in the St. Nicholas Church as the son of David Sweerts, a linen merchant, and Martina Ballu. Little is known about the artist's early life and nothing about his training.

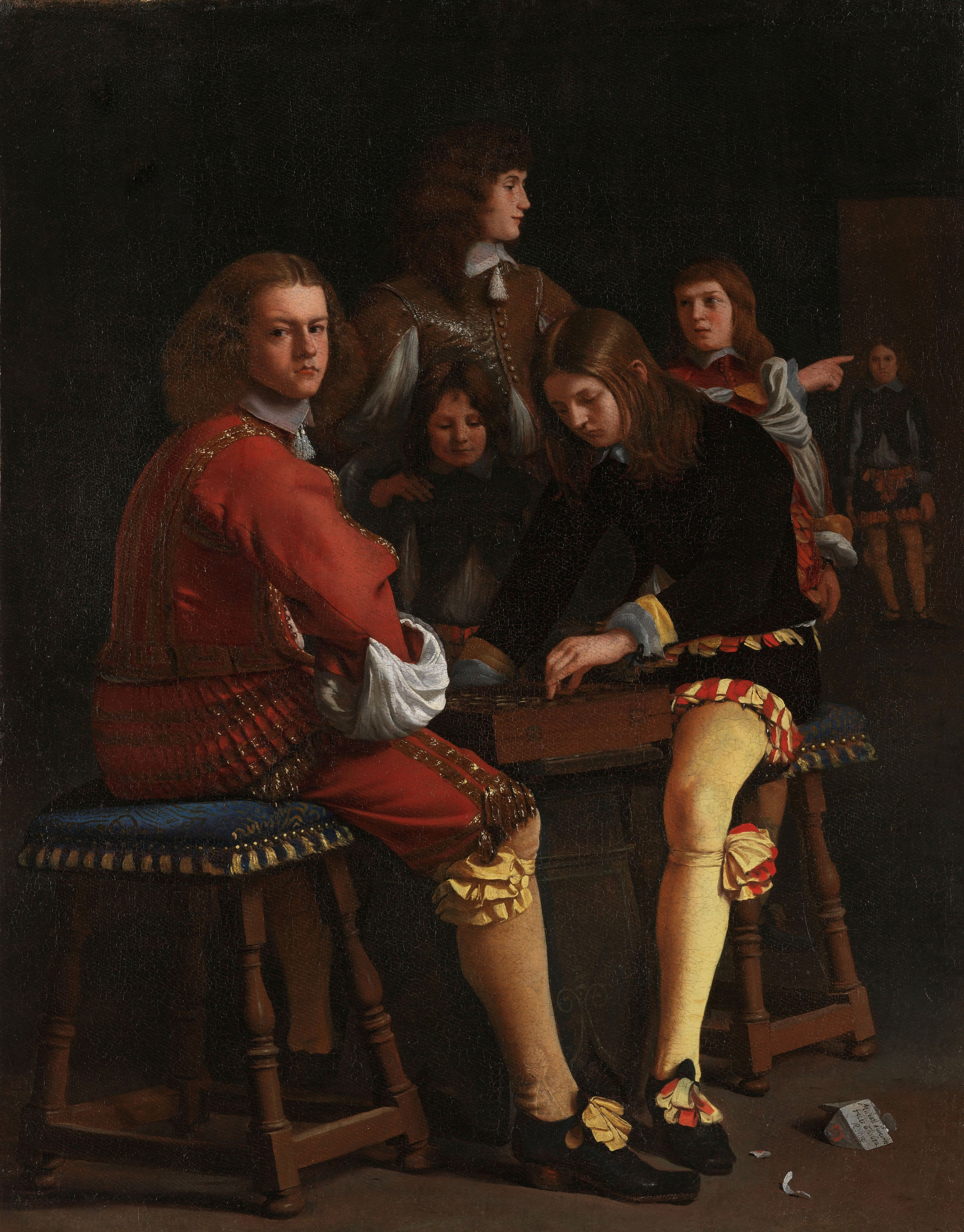
Draught players

He arrived in Rome in 1646 where he remained active until 1652 (or 1654). In Rome he became soon linked to the circle of Flemish and Dutch painters associated with Pieter van Laer, who is considered the founder of the Bamboccianti. By the time Sweerts arrived in Rome van Laer himself had already left the city. The Bamboccianti brought existing traditions of depicting peasant subjects from sixteenth-century Netherlandish art with them to Italy. They created small cabinet paintings or etchings of the everyday life of the lower classes in Rome and its countryside.

In Rome, Sweerts painted genre paintings in the style of the Bamboccianti as well as a series of canvases on the activities and training of painters in their studios, attending classes or working from live models. He resided near Santa Maria del Popolo. In 1647, Sweerts became an associate (aggregato) of the Accademia di San Luca, a prestigious association of leading artists in Rome. Sweerts is also recorded as having connections with members of the Congregazione Artistica dei Virtuosi al Pantheon. The Congregazione was a corporation of artists who organised annual exhibitions of their own paintings on the metal railings in front of the Pantheon. There is no evidence that Sweerts became himself a member of the Virtuosi. Sweerts lived from 1646 to 1651 in the Via Margutta where many foreign artists resided. While in Rome, Sweerts was the teacher of Willem Reuter, another Flemish painter from Brussels who spent time in Rome where he was influenced by the Bamboccianti.

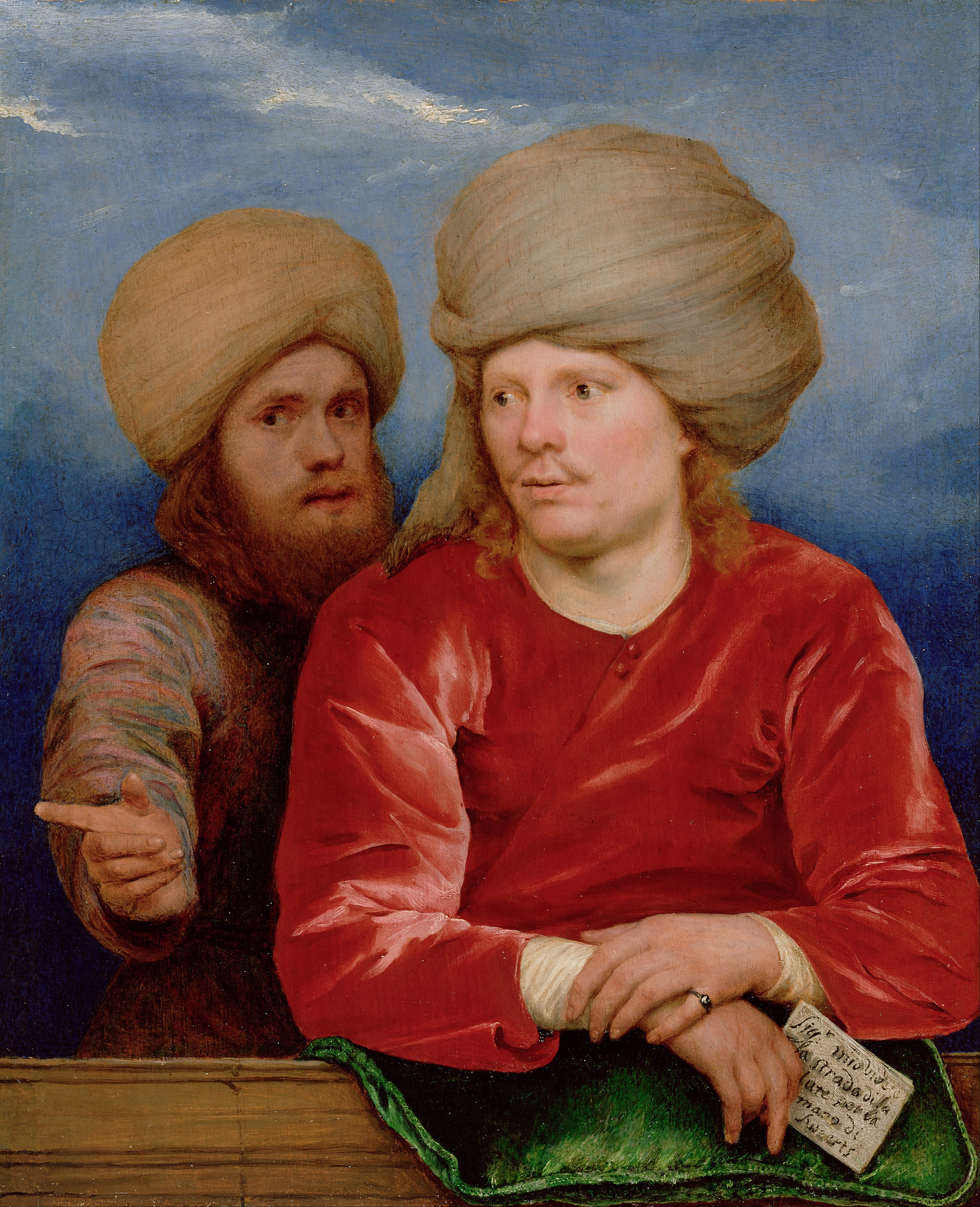
Double portrait

Despite the fragmentary nature of evidence pertaining to his career in Rome, it would appear that Sweerts succeeded in creating for himself a sufficiently solid reputation to be invited to enter into the service of the ruling papal family, the Pamphili family, and in particular Prince Camillo Pamphilj, the nephew of the reigning Pope Innocent X. He is said to have painted a portrait of Camillo Pamphilj. Sweerts also painted theatre decors for Camillo Pamphilj and purchased art for him as his agent. It is likely that his patron Prince Camillo Pamphilj involved Sweerts in the organization of an art academy in Rome. At the instigation of Camillo, the pope bestowed upon Sweerts the papal title of Cavaliere di Cristo (Knight of Christ), the same honor enjoyed by the likes of Gian Lorenzo Bernini and Francesco Borromini.

It is during his time in Rome that Sweerts developed a lifelong relationship with the Deutz family, who were one of the most prominent trading families of Amsterdam. In 1651 Jean Deutz gave Sweerts a power of attorney to act on his behalf in a sale of silk. The Deutz brothers also purchased paintings of Sweerts through the art market in Italy. Sweerts further acted for the Deutzes as an agent on the Italian art market. It is believed that the Portrait of Man with a Red Cloak (c. 1650, Wallace Collection) is in fact a portrait of Jean Deutz who was likely then in Rome on his grand tour.

=== Return to Brussels and residence in Amsterdam ===
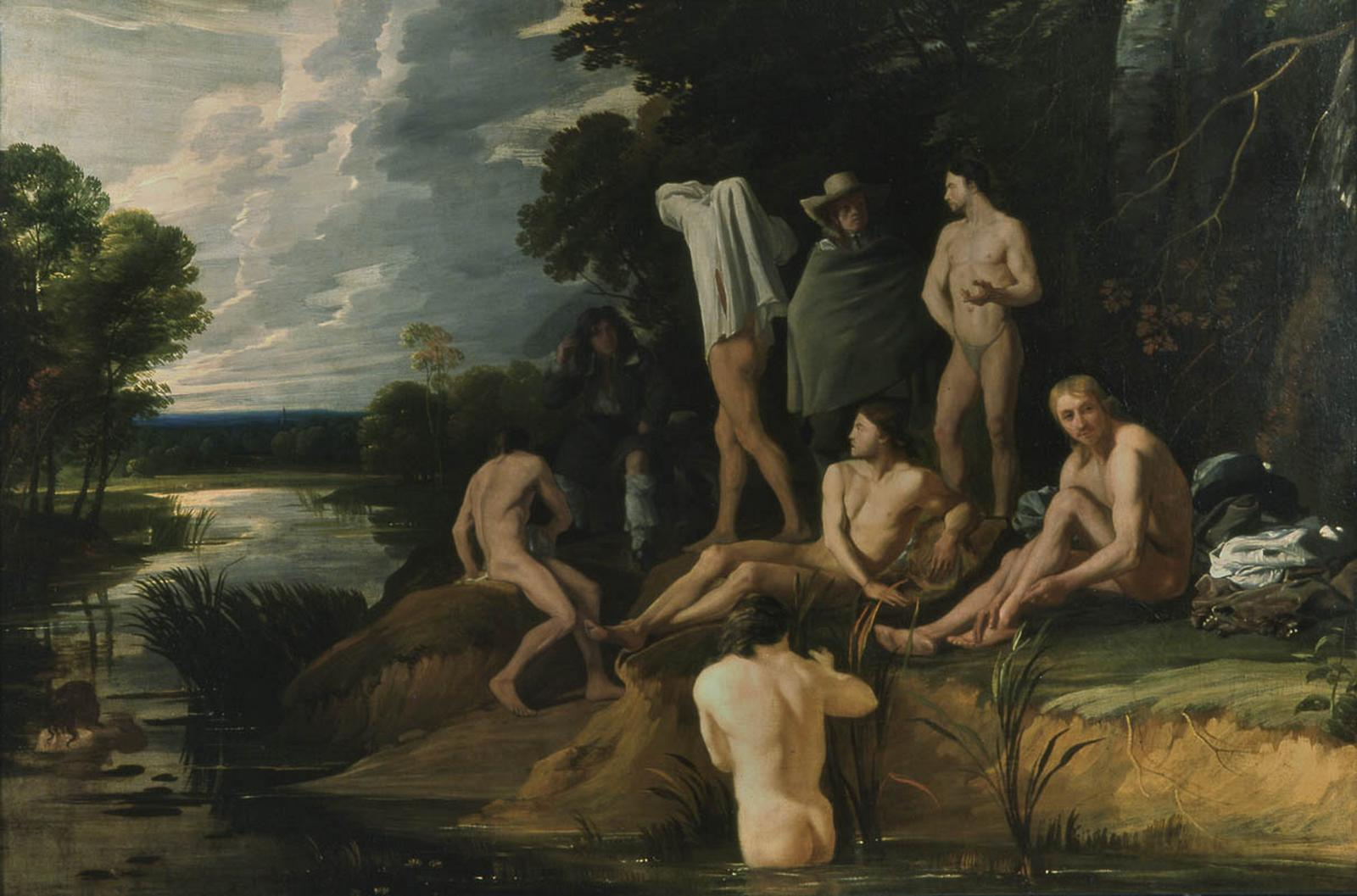
Bathing men

Despite enjoying the patronage of the highest echelons in Rome, Sweerts left Rome for unknown reasons sometime between 1652 and 1654. He is recorded in Brussels in July 1655 at the baptism of a child of his sister. In Brussels he joined the local Guild of Saint Luke in 1659. He opened an academy in Brussels where his students could work after live models and the Antique. He also created a series of prints of various human expressions, which were used in the training of his students.

In Brussels, Sweerts lived in a large town house close to the Grote Markt, in the street then called Voldersstraat, later renamed as a part of Lombardstraat. He moved into it not before August 1655 and left not after August 1658. The house was also occupied between 1649/50 and his death in 1657 by the household of an aristocratic military officer Gaspard Antoine d'Aubremont, governor of Dendermonde: he may have been Sweerts's landlord and patron. Michiel Sweerts's parents also lived in the house, as did Sweerts's servant Martinus Scheuts and the priest of a local church, Antoine de Bavay. Sweerts's art academy was probably also located there. The freehold of the house was bought in 1658 by a Brussels textile merchant Jerome Lefebure, but Lefebure then attempted to annul the purchase on the ground that the house was haunted by ghosts. Michiel Sweerts was one of several residents who testified to Lefebure's notary that he had been troubled by horrible noises, extraordinary banging sounds and inexplicable knocking on his door when there was nobody there. On advice from De Bavay, Sweerts challenged the ghost by sitting up in bed and saying "Who is there? If you are of God's ways, speak. But if you are of the devil's ways, go to the place to which you are destined." According to Sweerts, this was followed by a series of diminishing sounds like small thunderclaps as the ghost fled.

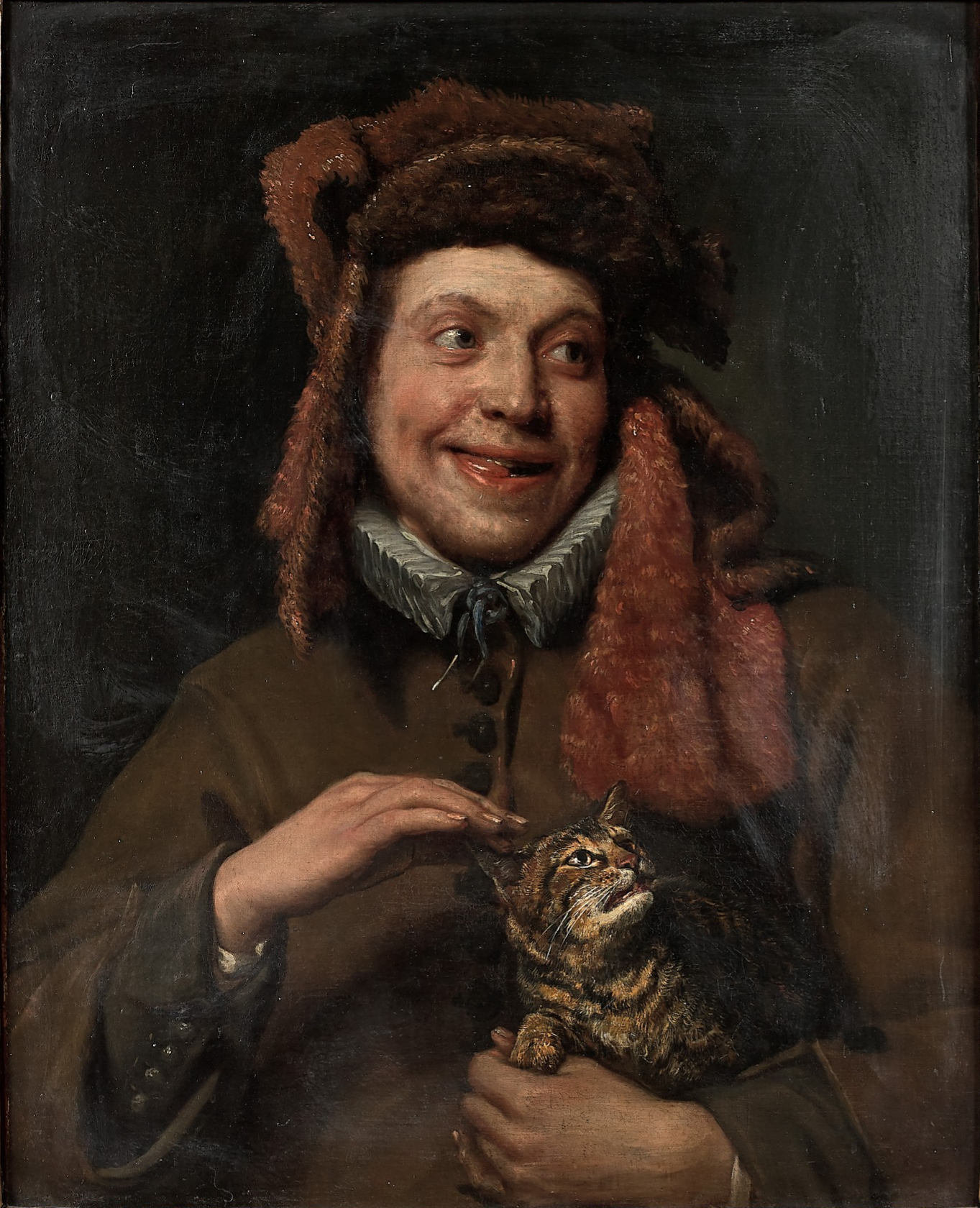
Portrait of a young man holding a cat (An allegory of touch)

When the dispute went to arbitration, contrary evidence was given by Martinus Scheuts, who stated that he had not experienced any ghosts, but that two other servants played at being ghosts by rolling [cannon-balls?] across the floor above Sweerts's bedroom. Scheuts cast doubt on Sweerts's testimony by impugning his sanity. Michiel Sweerts, he said, "was subject to frenzies according to various actions that he carried out and statements that he made. For example he boasted that he had had several revelations and had the spirit of prophecy, and other similar statements. In particular, he said that he had invented a boat that carried five thousand men and five thousand cannons, of which he said he was to be the engineer, and that God had given him the inspiration for it in order to overcome all non-believers. He had also proposed to His Highness Don John of Austria an invention whereby two hundred men would have [the equivalent force of?] about a thousand men, upon which his said Highness sent him away as a madman ["un Fol"]". Nevertheless, Sweerts's testimony helped to convince the court that the house was haunted, and Lefebure won his case.

Sweerts joined around this time the Missions Étrangères, a Catholic missionary organization, who were followers of Vincent de Paul and committed to proselytizing in the East. He was a lay brother and became a devout Christian. A Lazarus priest who met Sweerts in 1661 reported that Sweerts had apparently experienced a 'miraculous conversion' and had stopped eating meat, fasted daily, had given away his possessions and took communion three or four times a week.

In 1658, Sweerts made for the Guild of Saint Luke of Brussels a self-portrait as a farewell gift. He perhaps spent time in Amsterdam, probably as early as 1658. It is documented that he was present in Amsterdam for a number of months in the year 1661 just prior to setting off on his trip with the Missions Étrangères to the Far East. During his time in Amsterdam he helped supervise the building of the ship that would transport the Missions Étrangères to Alexandretta and then further East.

=== Travel to the East ===
By December 1661, Sweerts had arrived in Marseille from where his ship left for Palestine in January 1662. Sweerts sailed for Alexandretta with bishop François Pallu, 7 priests and another lay brother. In Syria he is said to have produced some paintings. On the overland portion of the trip in Syria he became mentally unstable and was dismissed from the company somewhere between Isfahan and Tabriz in Persia. He then travelled on to the Portuguese Jesuits in Goa where he is reported to have died at the age of 46.

== Work ==
=== General ===
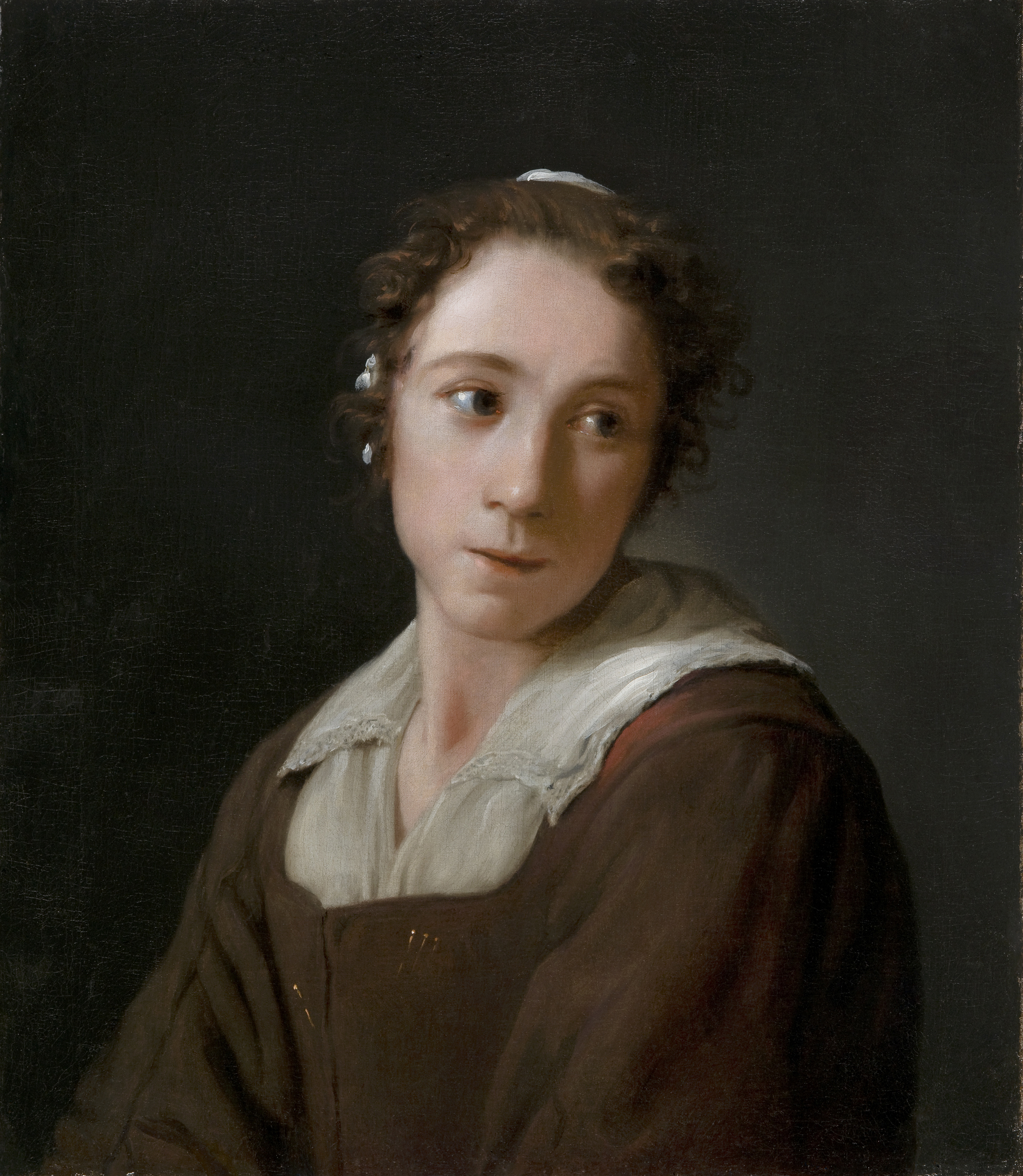
Portrait of a young woman

The surviving works by Sweerts mostly date to the period of his residence in Rome. Due to the difficulty of attributing works to the artist who rarely signed his works, the number of canvases given to the artist vary from 40 to 100. Some of Sweerts' works were so popular in his time that contemporary copies were made, some by Sweerts himself, others by pupils or followers. It is not always easy to determine the level of Sweerts' involvement (if any) in the making of these copies. For instance, there exist at least four early copies, of varying quality, of his Artist’s studio with a woman sewing (one copy at the Collection RAU - Fondation Unicef, Cologne). None of his paintings produced after he left Europe is known to survive.

The majority of his output falls into two categories: 'genre scenes" of low-life subjects of country and street life and portraits or tronies. A third category are allegorical works, which are regarded as enigmatic and are the subject of ongoing interpretation by art historians. Sweerts reportedly painted compositions of Biblical subjects, several of which are mentioned in contemporary inventories. However, none of these are known to have survived. One of his religious paintings, a Lamentation is known from the print, which Sweerts himself made after his own painting. The composition is unusual for the Virgin’s comforting gesture towards the inconsolable Mary Magdalene.

Sweerts is an enigmatic and difficult artist to categorise, since he absorbed a variety of influences to create an eclectic style that adapted Netherlandish genre painting to early tenebrist styles as well as blended Baroque and classicist tendencies.

=== Genre scenes ===
A large portion of the output of Sweerts consists of genre scenes. Some of these reprise the subjects popular with the followers of Caravaggio such as card and dice players and the procuress. Examples are the Draughts players and the Card players (both in the Rijksmuseum, Amsterdam). The latter composition depicts a group of people whose card game is interrupted by a brawl. Their eyes send the gaze of the viewer to the right, in the direction of the pointing arm of the man in the front. This painting possibly symbolizes laziness. A cunning boy takes advantage of the chaos to rob the man in blue.

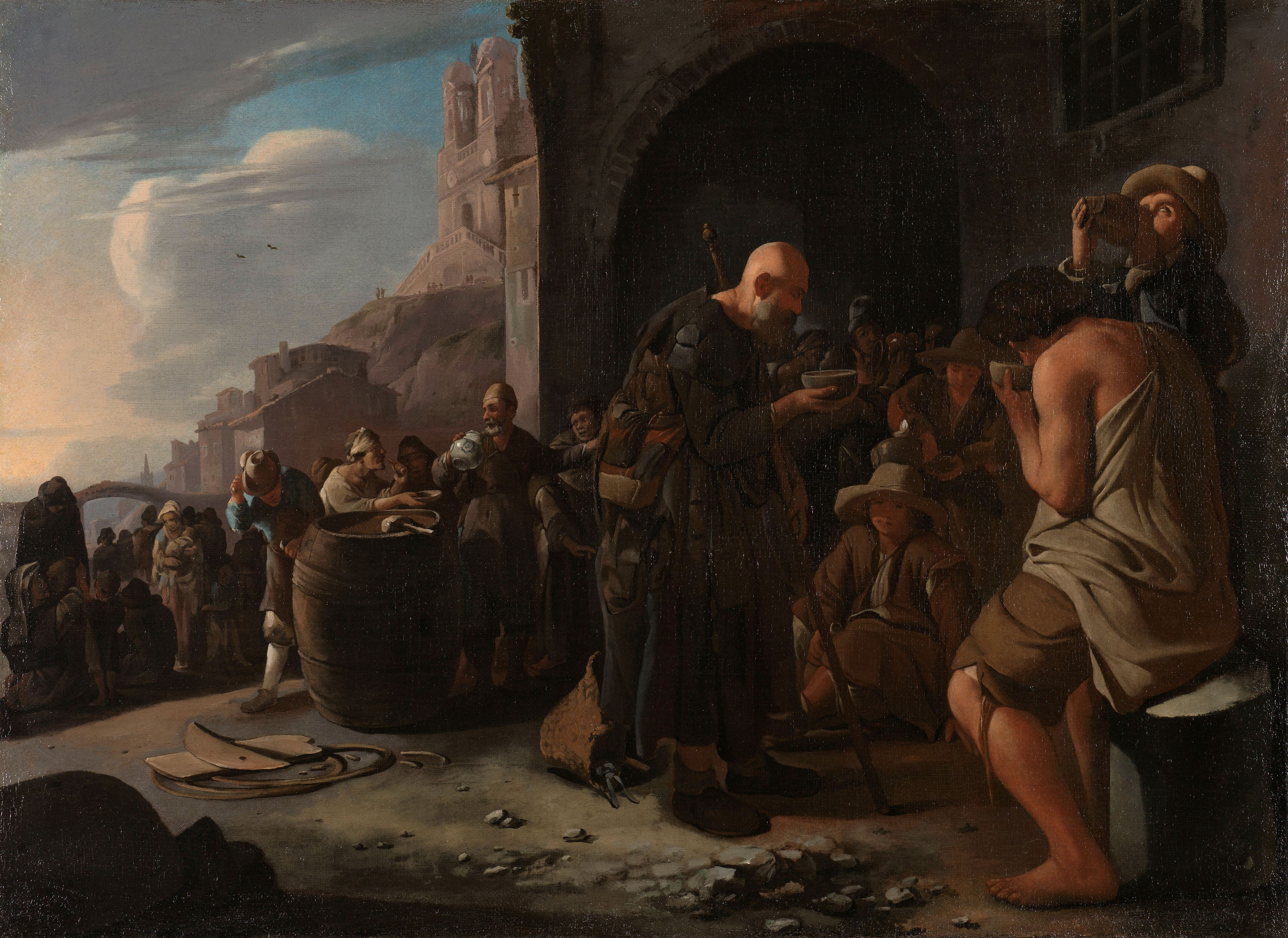
To give drink to the thirsty

Other genre paintings by of Sweerts depict low-life scenes mainly placed in the Roman Campagna or on Rome's streets in a style close to that of the Bamboccianti. An example is A man delousing himself and a sleeping boy (c. 1650 - 1654, Mauritshuis). Sweerts' compositions differ, however, from those of the other Bambocciante painters by his preference for antique sculpture and the noble appearance of his often monumental figures. Sweerts often used chiaroscuro to create a dramatic and mysterious atmosphere.

His personal style is clearly manifested in his Seven Acts of Mercy series (ca. 1646-9), a series of 7 canvases which he painted in Rome as genre-style renderings of a religious theme. The canvases are now dispersed over various museums. The subject of the Seven Acts of Mercy is based on the Gospel of Matthew, 25: 31-46. These verses announce the Last Judgment, the event during which Christ is said to judge man by his works. Sweerts depicted the good works in a contemporary Roman environment and incorporated topographical elements from the neighborhood in which he lived at the time. Sweerts shows in these scenes his preference for dark night skies and backgrounds, which dramatically light up the figures. These compositions represent the scenes in a frozen movement in a dreamlike setting almost like a film still. In this work Sweerts expresses his compassion and empathy with the suffering of his subjects and his support for the charitable acts performed for them.

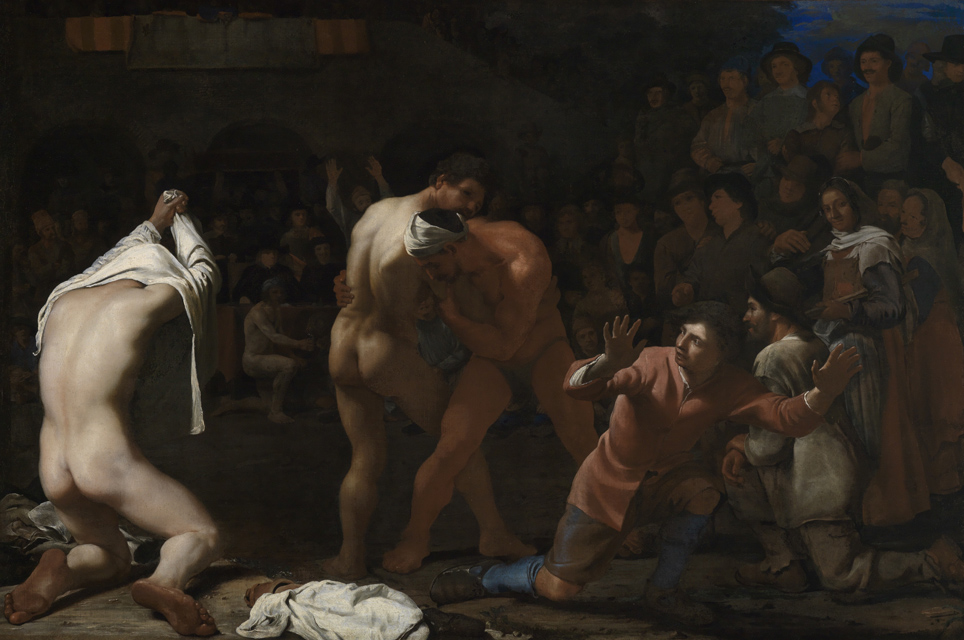
Wrestling match

Sweerts developed new themes such as that of the Roman wrestlers. In his Wrestling match (1649, Staatliche Kunsthalle Karlsruhe) Sweerts depicted the popular wrestling matches that took place in Rome's streets and were attended by a large audience. The representation is real, but at the same time somehow unreal. This is not only because of the dramatic lighting, but also by the fact that the movements of the men appear frozen. Sweerts relied for the main characters on classic images. Through the large scale of the nudes in this composition Sweerts lifted the 'vulgar' subject to a higher level.

Sweerts painted more compositions depicting male nudes such as the Bathing men (Musée des Beaux-Arts de Strasbourg). It has been demonstrated that Sweerts moved in a milieu in Rome from which women were generally excluded. The question remains whether some of his paintings of male nudes should be interpreted as denoting a message relating to homosexuality.

=== Artist studios ===
Sweerts' genre scenes include several compositions depicting artists training or at work in their studios or outdoors. They provide valuable visual evidence on the work habits and training of 17th-century artists. Sweerts also depicted a number of drawing schools. He was himself actively involved in art education at academies in Rome and Brussels.

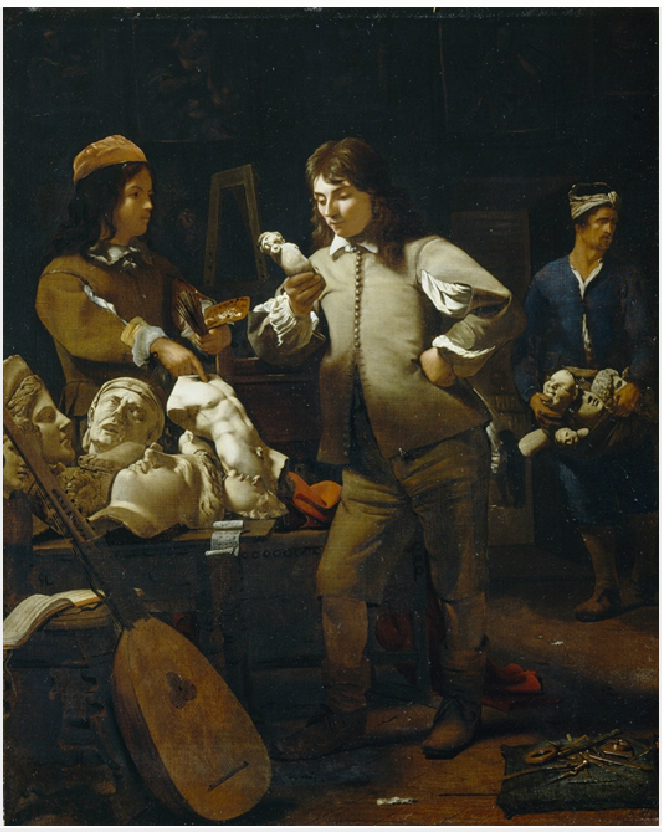
Artist studio

His Painter's studio (1648-1650, Rijksmuseum) shows various draughtsmen in an artist studio drawing after various plaster models and probably one live nude. There are also two visitors in the studio. The picture seems to depict the main principles and stages of studio practice, starting from drawing after casts and anatomical figures in plaster and then from the live model.

The prominence given to the plaster models in the right front of the composition show the importance in the artistic training and practice of contemporary artists of the study of casts of not only Antique but also modern sculptures. In another composition on the theme of the Artist studio (1652, Detroit Institute of Arts), a visitor to an artist studio is examining a cast of a limbless Apollo, which is based on a model by the 17th century Flemish sculptor François Duquesnoy, who worked in Rome. Other objects present in the composition include surveying instruments, a lute and sheet music. These objects are a reference to the need for artists to strive for harmony as well as respect accurate size and proportion. The glimpse of the library in the composition highlights that painters are not craftsmen, but learned artists.

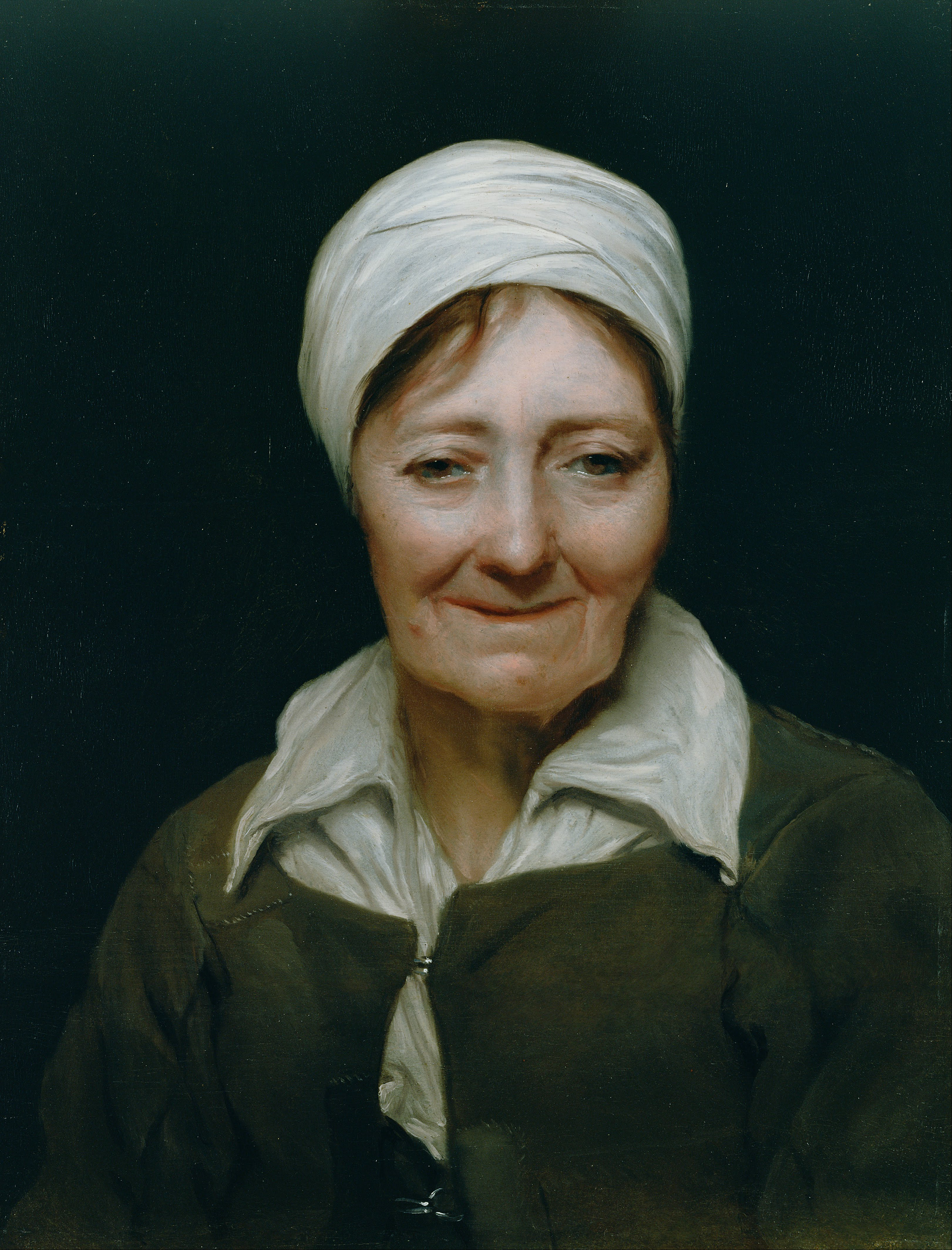
Head of a woman

=== Portraits and tronies ===
In his portraits Sweerts proved himself on a par with the leading contemporaries in the field. Sweerts is believed to have painted his tronies in Brussels or Amsterdam, i.e. between 1655 and 1661. He showed an interest in depicting ordinary people and exploring character and different expressions. In his Clothing the naked Sweerts portrayed very non-classical (i.e. Netherlandish-looking) figures whose features are emphasized by sideway glances and curious expressions. The beautiful daylight and velvety backgrounds can also be found in works by Johannes Vermeer. Sweerts' tronies of young women with their use of antique props also anticipate Vermeer. This work and another work such as the Anthonij de Bordes and his valet (National Gallery of Art) are examples of portraits that take the form of genre paintings.

His subject matter is close to that of Dutch genre painters such as Pieter de Hooch and Vermeer. His Head of a Woman (ca. 1654, J. Paul Getty Museum, Los Angeles) is a noteworthy example of his ability to capture the lively and distinctive humanity of even his most humble, anonymous subjects.

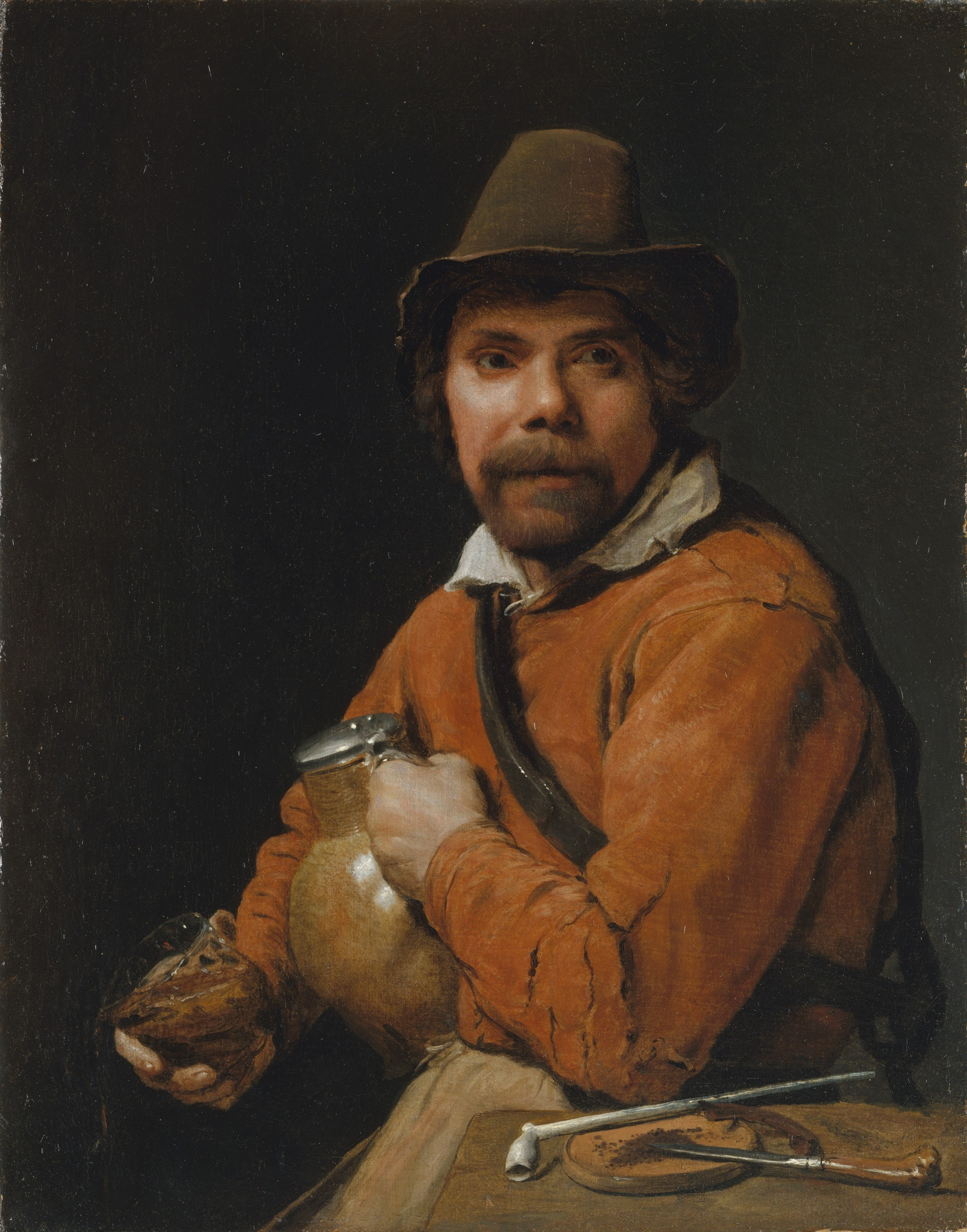
Man holding a jug

His Portrait of a young woman (c. 1660, Kremer Collection), which is likely a portrait of a simple maidservant, also shows Sweerts' interest in portraying common people. The painting has been compared to the Girl with a Pearl Earring painted by Vermeer some five years later. The young girls in both compositions are depicted with a combination of realism and idealisation. There are important differences between the two works. Vermeer's composition is more compact, his light reflections are more subtle and Vermeer uses yellow and blue tones in a more daring manner. Vermeer further shows the young girl wearing an exotic turban and a pearl earring that appears too big to be real. Sweerts prefers to show the girl as a simple maidservant without frills.

Some of Sweerts' tronies can be traced back to the "low life" studies of characters in the Spanish Netherlands through Adriaen Brouwer and his followers to Pieter Bruegel the Elder in the 1560s. Sweerts succeeded in making these subjects look freshly observed. An example is the Man holding a jug (Metropolitan Museum of Art). In this depiction of a tavern habitué Sweerts succeeds in displaying his remarkable gifts for describing character as well as physical substances and light effects.

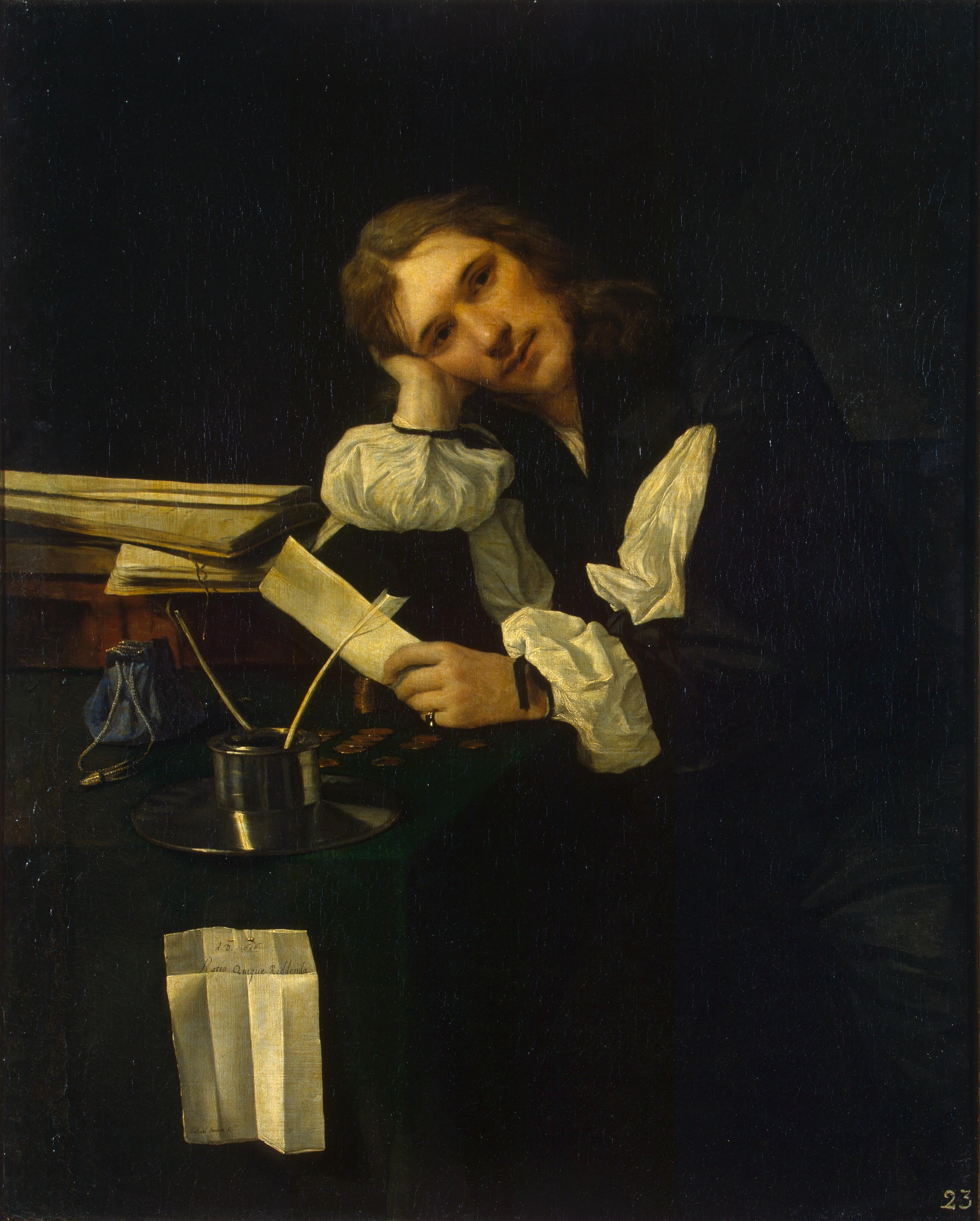
Portrait of a young man

Sweerts painted a number of self-portraits and some of his portraits are regarded as being self-portraits. The earliest known self-portrait of about 1648-50 (Uffizi) shows the artist wearing a beret with a plunging feather giving him a distinctly 'bohemian' air.

His Self-portrait of 1656 (Allen Memorial Art Museum) shows the artist in a confident pose. This self-portrait stands in a long-established line of self-portraits by Netherlandish artists, showing themselves with the tools of their craft. His elegant, aristocratic appearance also brings to mind the artist portraits in Iconography of Anthony van Dyck, published in Antwerp between 1636 and 1641. The emphasis is on showing the artist as a virtuoso who possesses an aristocratic posture, learning and esteem. Sweerts made a mirror image reproduction of this self-portrait in an etching bearing the inscription Michael Sweerts Eq. Pi. et fe.

In another self-portrait, probably painted about 1655, the artist points to a skull as a vanitas reminder. Another presumed self-portrait is the Portrait of a young man (1656, Hermitage), which shows a young man in a melancholy pose. It was previously believed that the sitter's mood was connected to his financial difficulties. The current view is that the painting is a pensieroso (pensive) portrait, a motive going back to the fifteenth-century Neoplatonic concept that melancholy is the distinguishing feature of the creative character. The allegorical significance of the objects in the painting such as old books, empty purse, gold coins, and inkwell is consistent with this interpretation. The portrait also has a moralizing inscription, RATIO QUIQUE REDDENDA (Every man must give an accounting). This allegorical strain is characteristic of Sweerts' art.

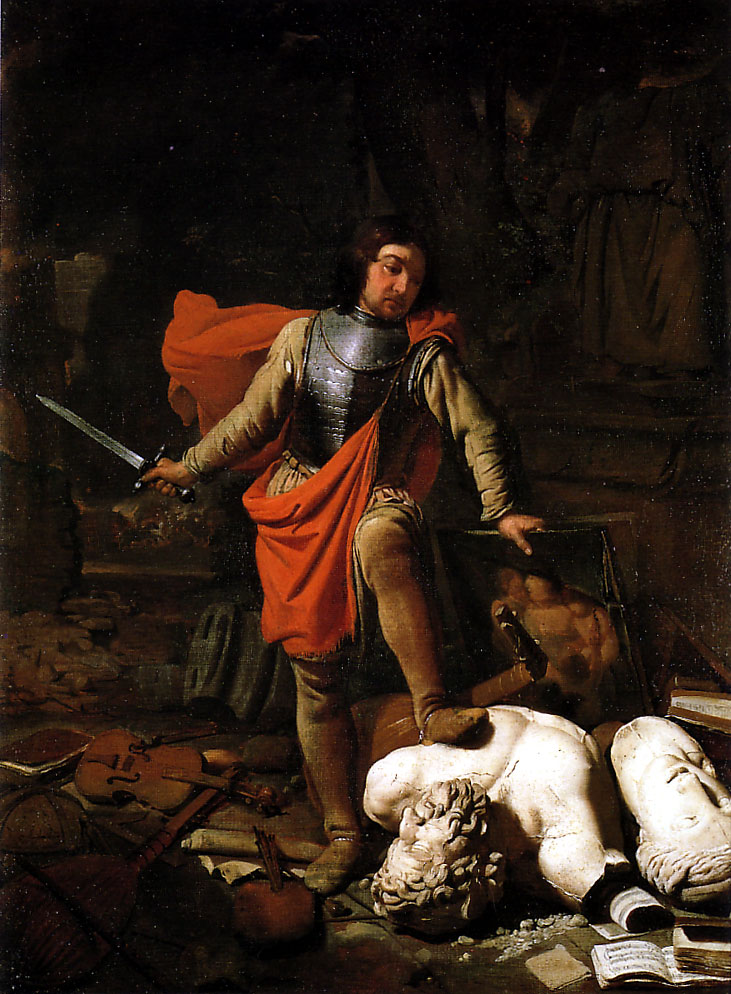
Mars destroying art

Another painting that doubles as a self-portrait is the Penitent reading in a room (Marco Grassi Collection, New York), showing a man reading a sacred book amidst vanitas symbols such as a skull and an hourglass. The message of the painting may be that faith is available everywhere. This painting could foreshadow Sweerts' conversion to a more fanatical immersion in his faith that would finally compel him to travel to the East.

=== Allegorical scenes ===
A number of compositions deal with subjects, which appear to have an allegorical meaning. Many of these works still escape full understanding by contemporary scholarship. Some of his portraits carry an allegorical meaning and stand in the Netherlandish tradition of depicting the five senses. An example is the series of five portraits of boys and girls representing the five senses, which are now dispersed over various collections. Two of them of a boy and a girl respectively representing Smell and Feeling are in the Museum Boijmans Van Beuningen.

Another allegorical composition is his Mars Destroying the Arts (Private collection) in which Sweerts portrayed a soldier plundering a violin, paintings and sculpture.

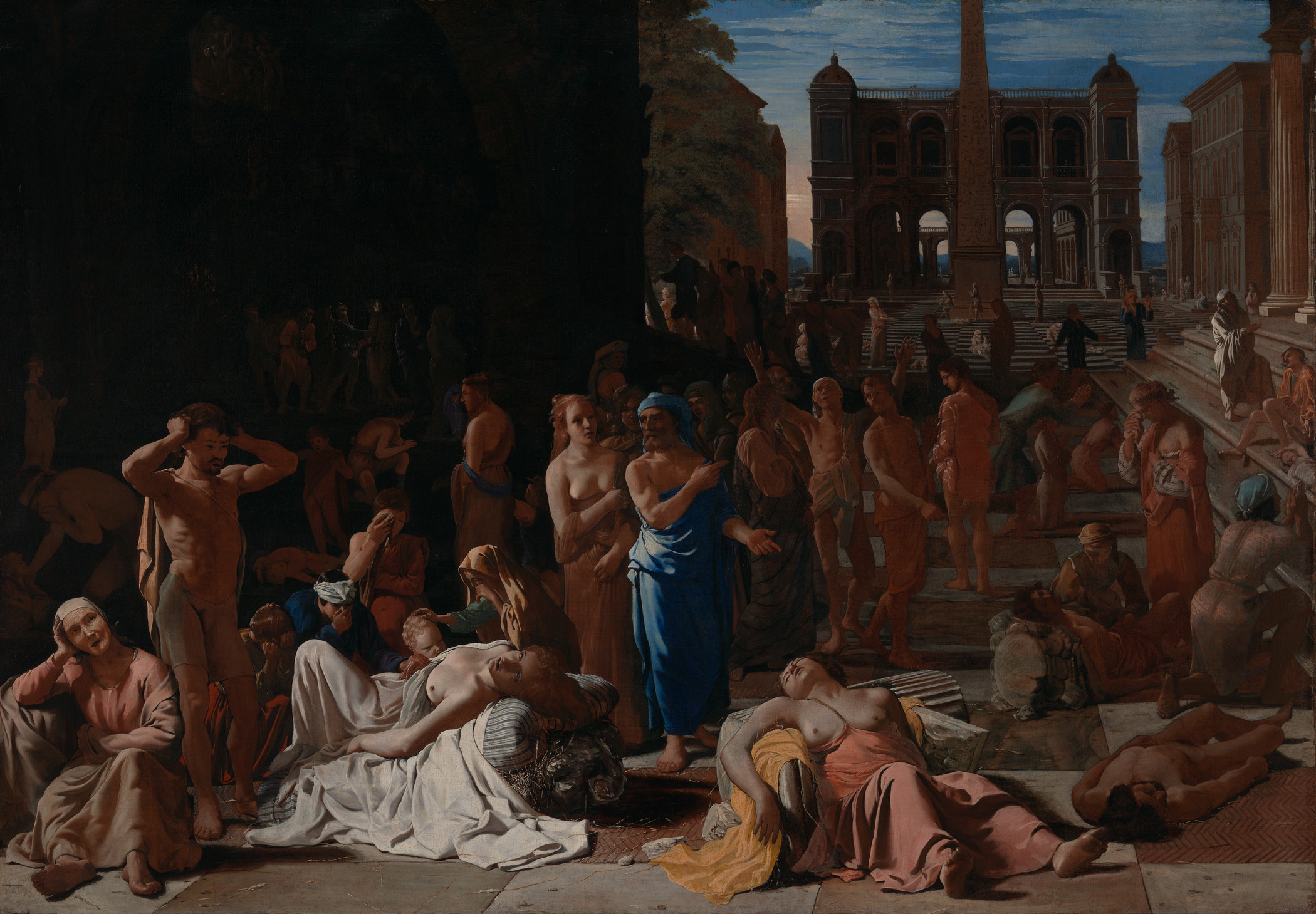
Plague in an Ancient City

Sweerts' monumental Plague in an Ancient City (ca. 1652-54, Los Angeles County Museum of Art) is regarded as Sweerts' most ambitious work in terms not only of compositional complexity and technical achievement, but also of historical and archeological erudition. The composition depicts a haunting, dramatic vision of the ravages of the bubonic plague in a classical setting. It is clearly an attempt by the artist at proving his talent both in the depiction of a historical scene of epic proportions that encompasses a broad range of emotional and psychological states in imitation of the grand classicizing style of his older French contemporary and fellow-resident in Rome, Nicolas Poussin (1594–1665). Art historians have proposed various theories about what the composition depicts and its interpretation. Some see in it a generic depiction of the effects of the plague with no specific historical, moral or narrative meaning.

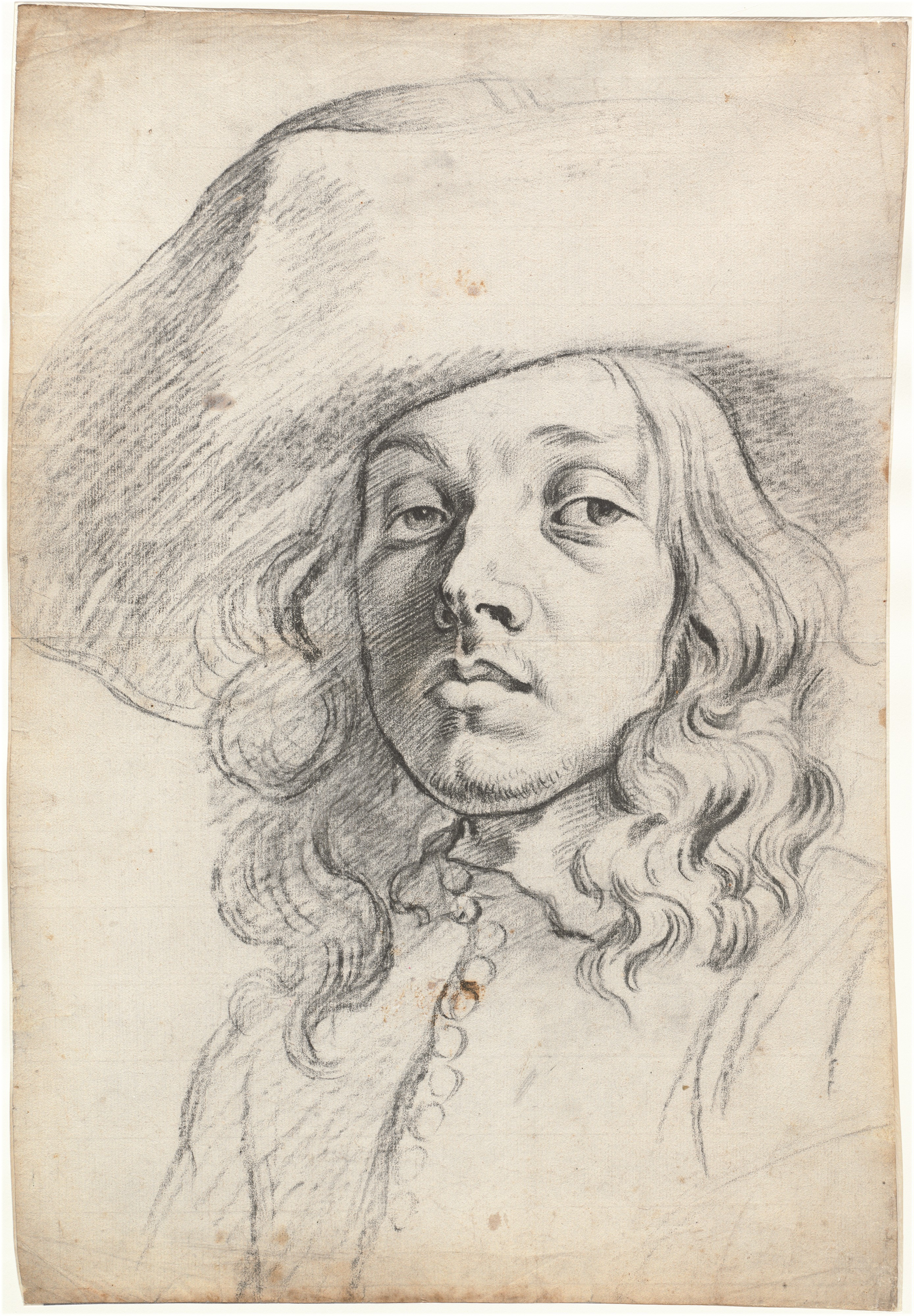
Portrait of Jan van den Enden

The art scholar Franco Mormando has recently argued that the Plague in an Ancient City depicts a specific plague that according to Christian sources took place in Rome in 361–63 during the reign of emperor Julian. Emperor Julian had sought a return to Roman paganism against the Christian faith. The plague during Julian's reign was regarded in Sweerts' time as a punishment for Julian's anti-Christian policies. In the composition Sweerts was likely commenting on the contemporary struggle of the Catholic Church against Protestantism. The historical, religious, artistic and archeological allusions of the composition would not have been evident to ordinary lay viewers but only to small group of the cultural elite who delighted in such painted puzzles.

=== Prints ===
Sweerts etched a small number of plates, 21 in total. These were issued in small editions making his prints exceptionally rare. He engraved a series of 13 plates with a Latin title, Diversae facies in usum iuvenum et aliorum ('Various faces for use by the young and others'), which served as drawing models for his academy students. For this reason a full set of the prints in the collection of the Fitzwilliam Museum were squared up in pencil to facilitate copying. The set was published in Brussels in 1656, the same year that Sweerts established a drawing academy in the city.

=== Drawings ===
Very few drawings have been attributed with certainty to Sweerts. A portrait in black chalk of Jan van den Enden (c. 1651, National Gallery of Art) is a very powerful portrait drawing of a young man. It is one of the first drawings attributed with any reasonable certainty to Sweerts.
