= Bamboccianti =

Genre painters active in Rome in the 1600s

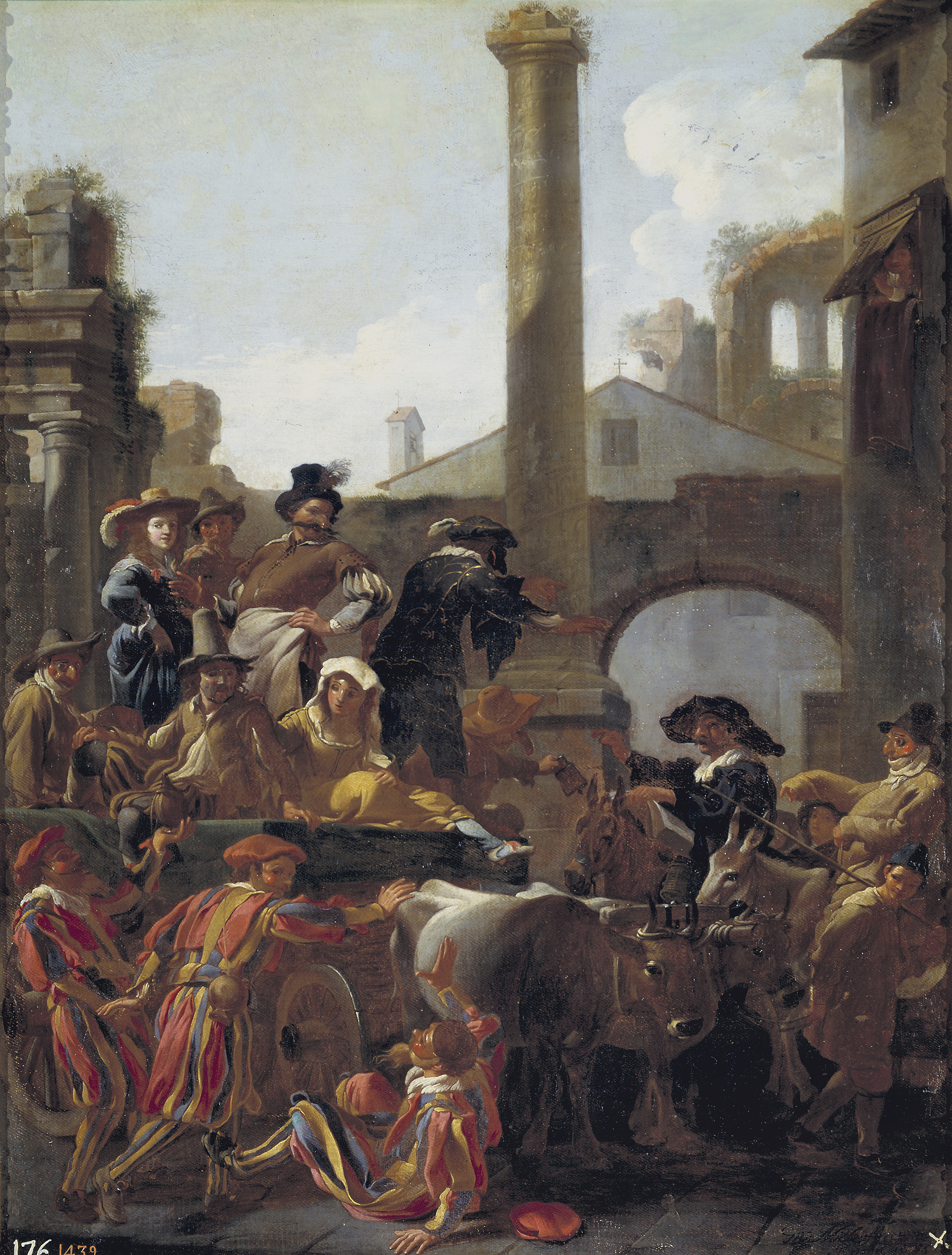
Roman Carnival by Jan Miel, 1653

The Bamboccianti were genre painters active in Rome from approximately 1625 until the end of the seventeenth century. Most were Dutch and Flemish artists who brought with them to Italy existing traditions of depicting peasant subjects drawn from sixteenth-century Netherlandish art, and they generally created small cabinet paintings or etchings of the everyday life of the lower classes in Rome and its countryside.

Typical subjects include food and beverage sellers, farmers and milkmaids at work, soldiers at rest and play, and beggars – or, as Salvator Rosa lamented in the mid‑seventeenth century, "rogues, cheats, pickpockets, bands of drunkards and gluttons, scabby tobacconists, barbers, and other 'sordid' subjects." Despite their lowly subject matter, these works found favour among elite collectors and commanded high prices.

== Artists ==
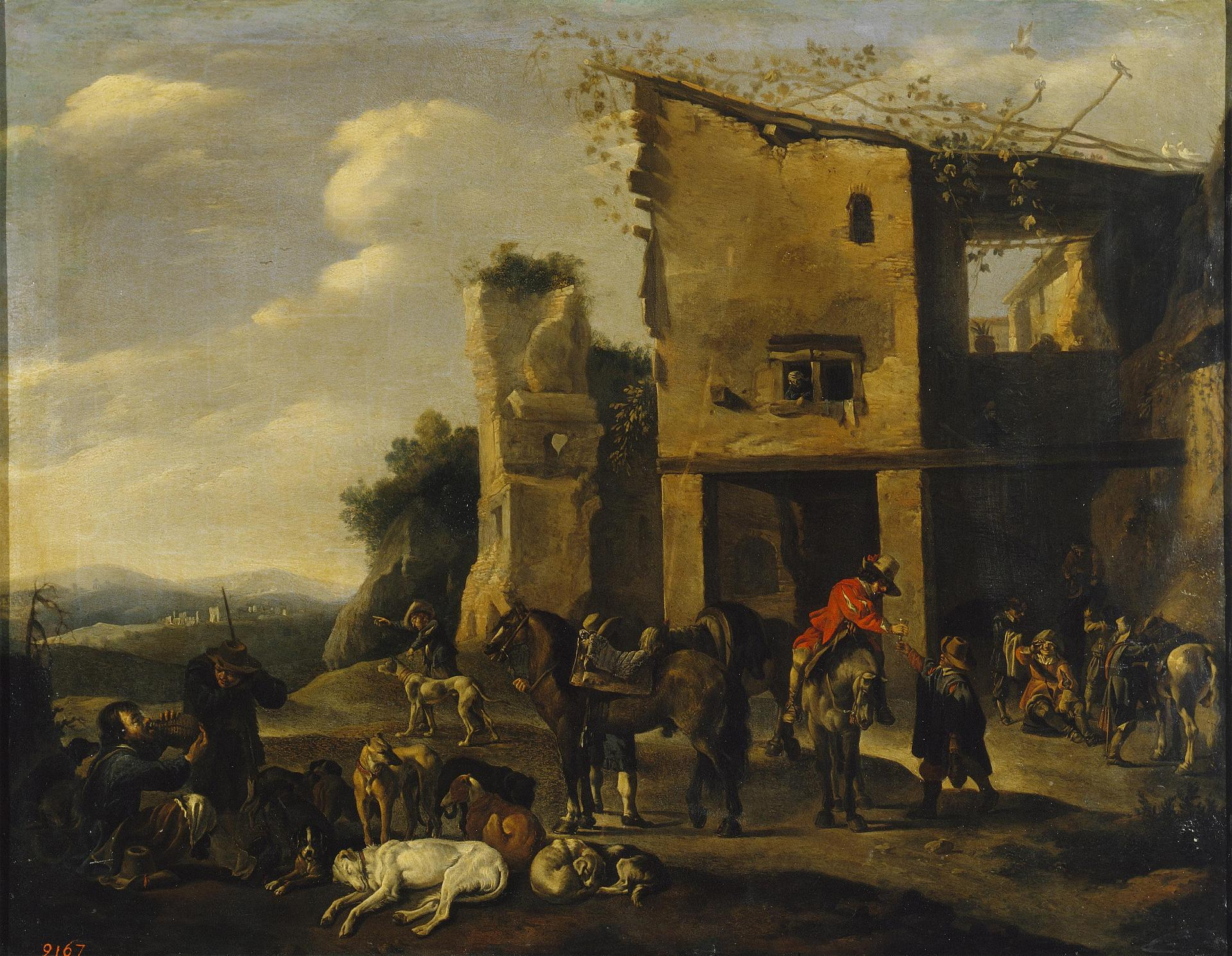
Hunter at Rest by Pieter van Laer

Many of the artists associated with the Bamboccianti were members of the Bentvueghels (Dutch for 'birds of a feather'), an informal association of mainly Dutch and Flemish artists in Rome. It was customary for the Bentvueghels to adopt an appealing nickname, the so‑called 'bent name'. The bent name of the Dutch painter Pieter van Laer was 'Il Bamboccio', which means 'ugly doll' or 'puppet'. This was an allusion to van Laer's ungainly proportions. Van Laer is regarded as the initiator of the Bamboccianti style of genre painting, and his nickname gave the genre and the group of artists its collective name. He became the inspiration and focal point around which like‑minded artists congregated during his stay in Italy (1625–1639).

The initial Bamboccianti included Andries and Jan Both, Karel Dujardin, Jan Miel, Johannes Lingelbach and the Italian artist Michelangelo Cerquozzi. Sébastien Bourdon was also associated with the group during his early career. Other Bamboccianti include Michiel Sweerts, Thomas Wijck, Dirck Helmbreker, Jan Asselyn, Anton Goubau, Willem Reuter and Jacob van Staverden.

The Bamboccianti influenced Rococo artists such as Domenico Olivieri, Antonio Cifrondi, Pietro Longhi, Giuseppe Maria Crespi, Giacomo Ceruti and Alessandro Magnasco. Their paintings of everyday Roman life continued into the nineteenth century through the works of Bartolomeo and Achille Pinelli, Andrea Locatelli and Paolo Monaldi. A still‑unidentified Bambocciante also painted an Assalto d'armati (armed assault), now held in the Pinacoteca Civica (City Art Gallery) in Forlì.

== Characteristics ==
Giovanni Battista Passeri, a seventeenth‑century chronicler of art, described van Laer's work as an "open window" that provides an accurate representation of the world around him – a characteristic applied to the Bamboccianti in general:

"era singular nel represetar la veritá schietta, e pura nell'esser suo, che li suoi quadri parevano una finestra aperta pe le quale fussero veduti quelli suoi successi; senza alcun divario, et alterazione."

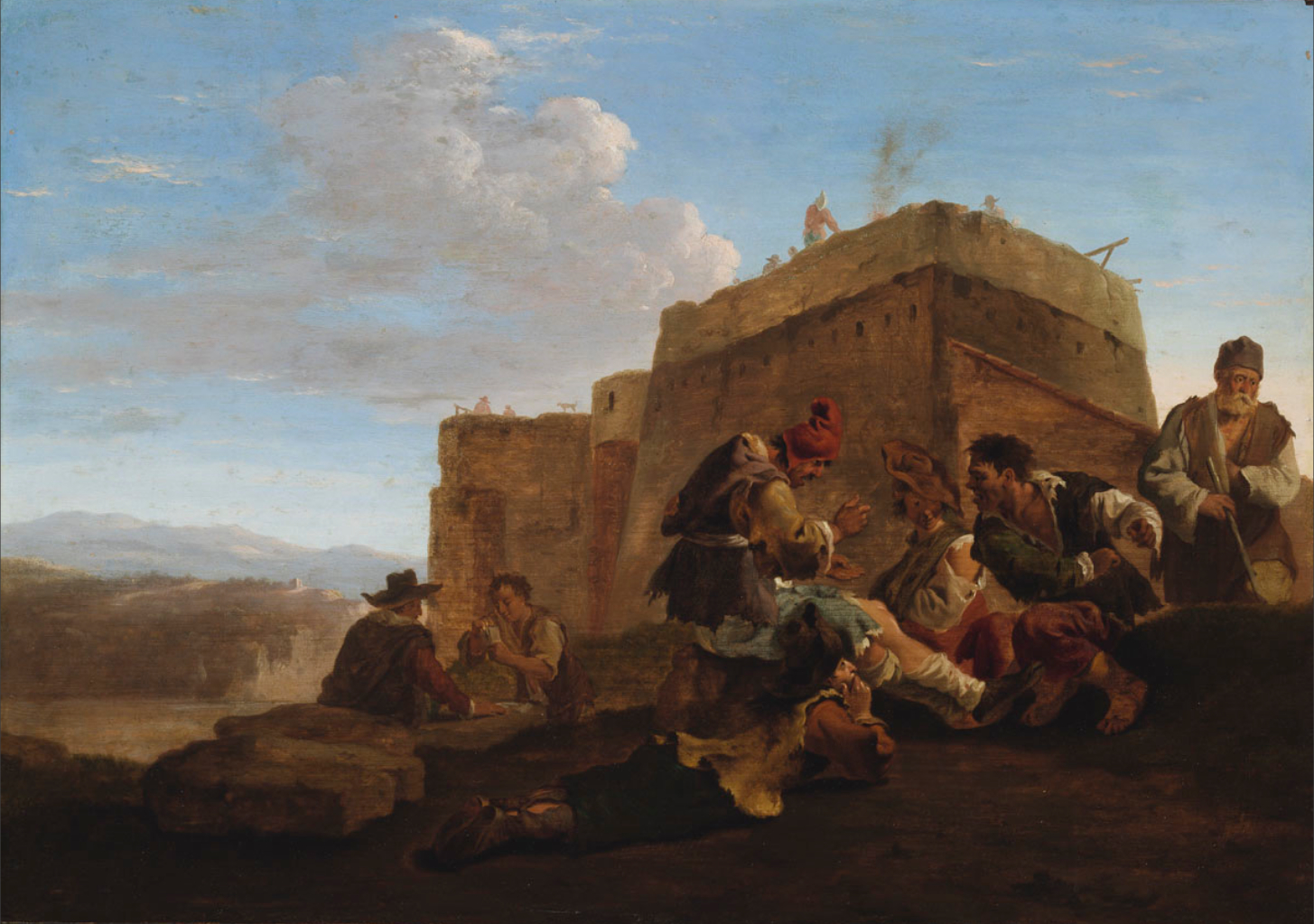
The Small Limekiln (Landscape with Morra Players), attributed to Jan Both

"[he] was unique in representing the truth in its pure essence, such that his paintings appear to us like an open window through which we can see all that happens, without difference or alteration."

Passeri here expressed the traditional art‑historical view that the Bamboccianti paintings offered a realist "true portrait of Rome and its popular life" "without variation or alteration" of what the artist sees. However, their contemporaries did not generally regard the Bamboccianti as realists. An alternative view of their art is that these works should rather be seen as complex allegories – commentaries on classical art intended to lead the observer towards more elevated ideas. They thus stand in a long tradition of paradox, in which low or vulgar subjects served as vehicles for conveying important philosophical meanings. For instance, the Bamboccianti regularly painted gigantic limekilns outside Rome. These kilns used marble and travertine blocks from ancient Roman ruins as raw material, thereby playing a direct role in the destruction of Rome's antique monuments. The limekilns themselves were painted in a grandiose manner, as if they were the new monuments of Rome. From the ruins of ancient Rome, the kilns created something new, and the lime they produced was used in the construction of new monuments in the city. The paintings of these limekilns can therefore be read as reflections on the transience of glory, as well as on Rome's regenerative power. In other words, these works were intended to be read ironically and allegorically (even as paradoxes), not as exact, realist depictions of life in Rome.

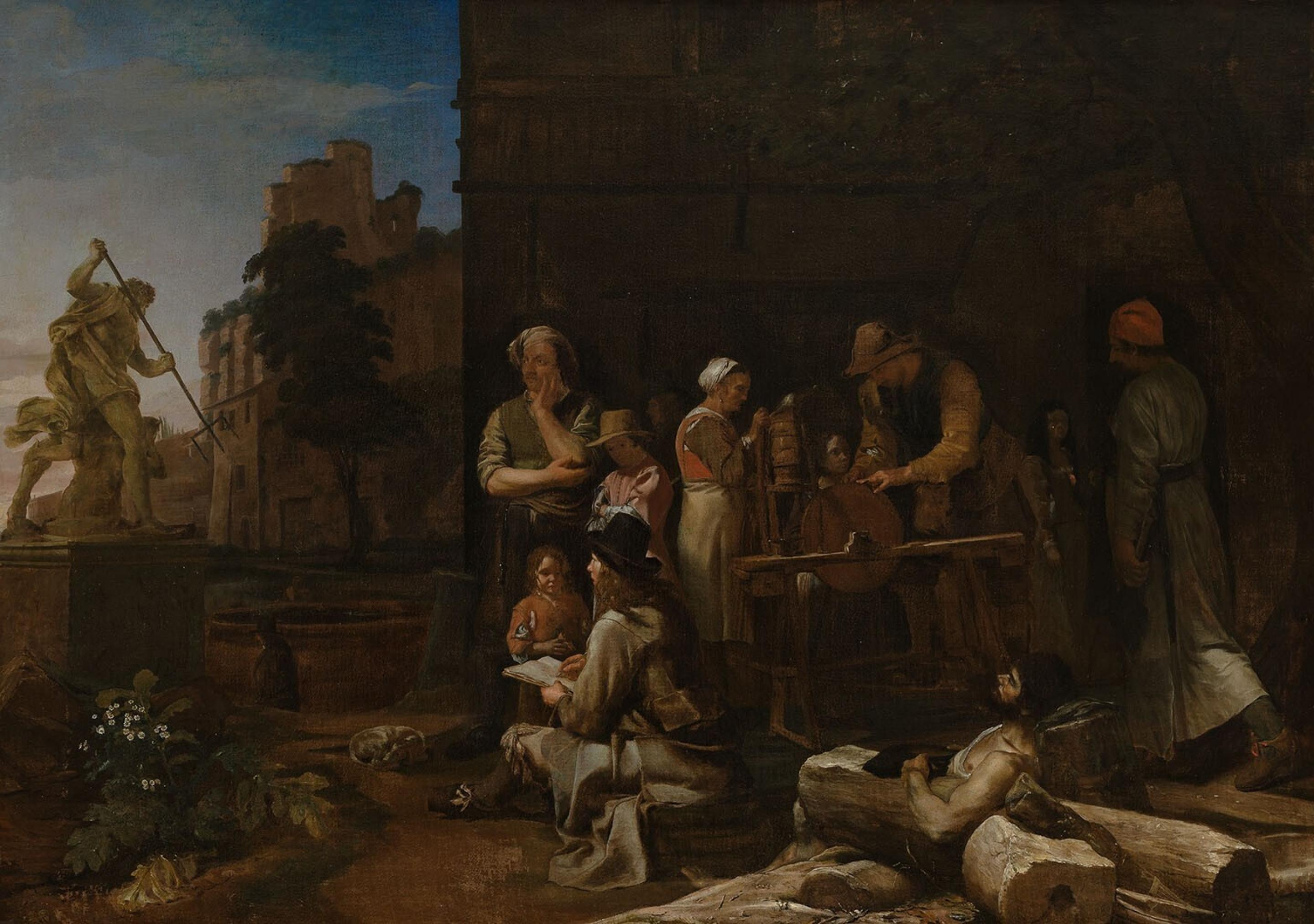
Roman Streetscene with a Young Artist by Michiel Sweerts

During the 1640s and 1650s, Jan Miel and Michelangelo Cerquozzi began to expand the scope of Bamboccianti compositions by paying more attention to the surrounding landscape and placing less emphasis on the anecdotal aspects of city and country life. These works were repeatedly used as models by the Bamboccianti of the second half of the century and by genre painters working in Rome during the early eighteenth century. Miel's most original contribution to the genre is his carnival scenes.

The painter Karel Dujardin brought a different variation to the genre by placing his depictions of peasants and charlatans in the idealised setting of the lofty ruins of the countryside around Rome.

== Critical reception ==
Although the Bamboccianti found success with their paintings, art theorists and academicians in Rome were often unkind to them, as paintings of everyday life were generally regarded as occupying the lowest rung of the hierarchy of genres. The artists themselves were often admired, however: van Laer was known as an artist whose works could command high prices, and Michelangelo Cerquozzi was able to gain access to aristocratic circles and befriend artists such as Pietro da Cortona.

Among the collectors and patrons of the Bamboccianti one finds Cardinal del Monte, Vincenzo Giustiniani, papal families such as the Barberini and Pamphili, and female patrons including elite Roman aristocrats and Christina, Queen of Sweden. The success of the genre was not confined to Rome but extended to Florence and France, as seen in the patronage of figures such as Cardinals Leopoldo de' Medici and Mazarin.

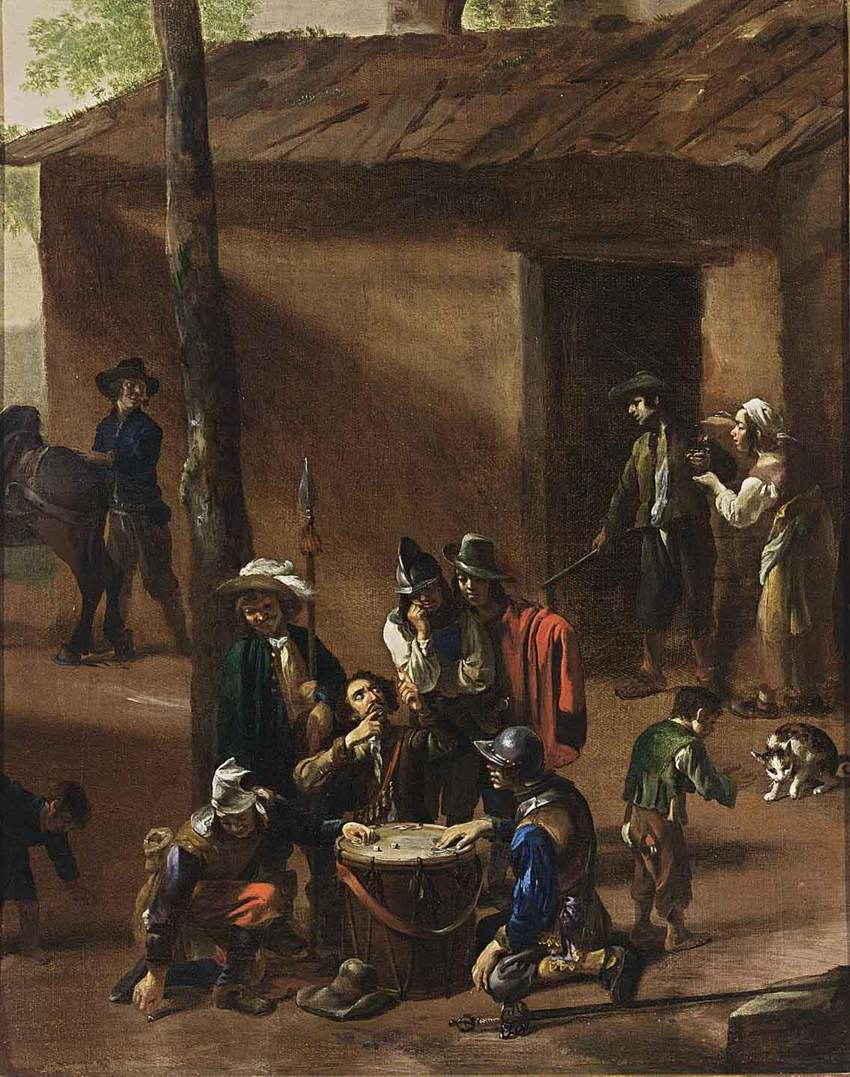
Soldiers Playing Dice by Michelangelo Cerquozzi

The success of the genre can be partly explained by a change in the way the houses of the Roman upper classes were decorated. Paintings on canvas or panel gradually gained preference over frescoes, which gave foreign artists who specialised in this technique an advantage. Furthermore, as art lovers were looking for new subjects, a favourable environment existed for the reception of Bamboccianti art.

The fact that learned and aristocratic patrons continued to purchase works by these artists was frequently bemoaned by painters of histories and other genres within the accepted canon of the city's main artistic establishment, the Academy of St. Luke. For example, Salvator Rosa, in his satire on painting, Pittura (c. 1650), complains bitterly about the taste of aristocratic patrons and their acceptance of such everyday subjects:

"Quel che aboriscon vivo, aman dipinto."

"Those they abhor in life are loved in paint."

As Rosa's comment reflects, such derision was usually directed not at the artists but at those who bought the works. Acceptance of the Bamboccianti in the Accademia di San Luca – the prestigious association of leading artists in Rome – was not impossible, however. This is demonstrated by the fact that van Laer and Cerquozzi were associated with the academy (van Laer was also a member of the Bentvueghels). Jan Miel, in 1648, became the first northern artist to be admitted to the Accademia di San Luca.

== See also ==
- Romanism (painting)

== Sources ==
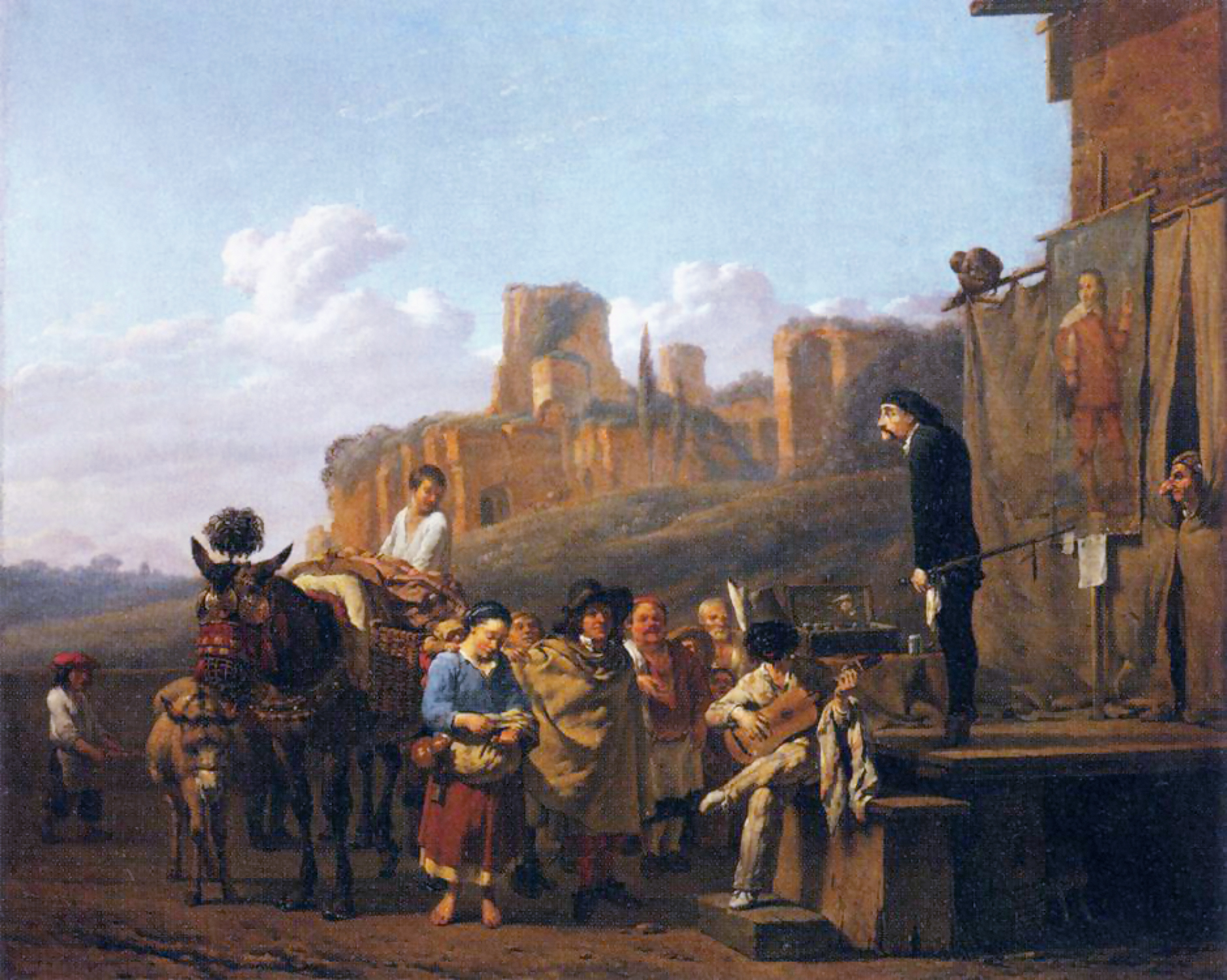
A Party of Charlatans in an Italian Landscape by Karel Dujardin, 1657

- Briganti, Giuliano (1983). The bamboccianti the painters of everyday life in seventeenth century Rome. U. Bozzi.
- Brigstocke, Hugh. "Bourdon, Sébastien", Grove Art Online. Oxford University Press, [October 30, 2007].
- Haskell, Francis (1993). "Chapter 8". Patrons and Painters: Art and Society in Baroque Italy. Yale University Press. ISBN 0-300-02537-8.
- Levine, David A. (December 1988). "The Roman Limekilns of the Bamboccianti". The Art Bulletin. 70 (4). College Art Association: 569–589. doi:10.2307/3051103. JSTOR 3051103.
- Roworth, Wendy W. (December 1981). "A Date for Salvator Rosa's Satire on Painting and the Bamboccianti in Rome". The Art Bulletin. 63 (4). College Art Association: 611–617. doi:10.2307/3050166. JSTOR 3050166.
- Slive, Seymour (1995). "Italianate and Classical Painting". Pelican History of Art, Dutch Painting 1600–1800. Penguin Books Ltd. pp. 225–245.
- Wittkower, Rudolf (1993). "Chapter 4". Pelican History of Art, Art and Architecture Italy, 1600–1750. 1980. Penguin Books Ltd. p. 323.
