= Willem Reuter =

Flemish painter

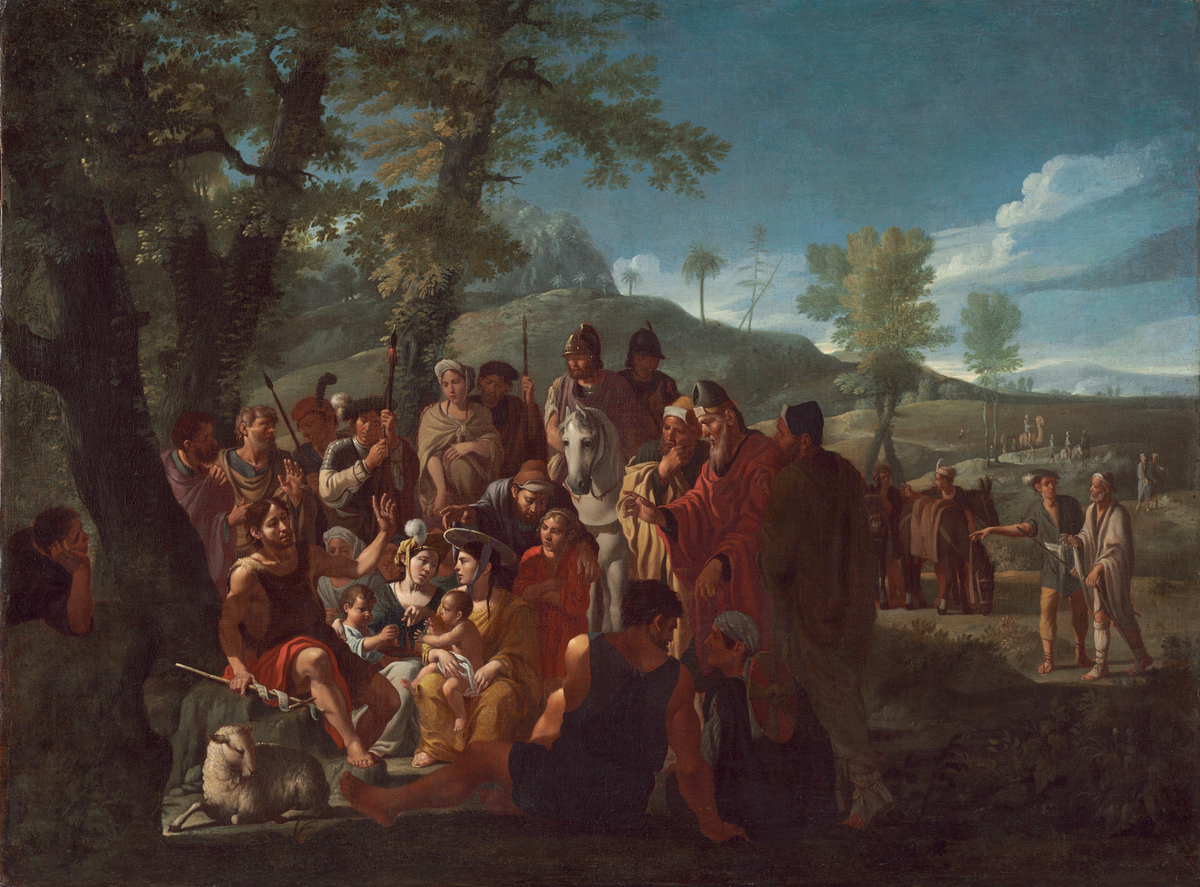
Saint John the Baptist preaching

Willem Reuter (c.1642 in Brussels – 1681 in Rome) was a Flemish painter of cityscapes, genre paintings and history paintings who was primarily active in Rome, where he was known as Guglielmo Reuter. He was part of the circle of Dutch and Flemish genre painters in Rome who are referred to as the 'Bamboccianti' and were known for their scenes depicting the lower classes in Rome.

== Life ==
Very little is known about Reuter’s early life in Flanders. He trained with the Brussels painter Michiel Sweerts. Sweerts had lived in Rome for ten years where he had moved into the circle of Flemish and Dutch genre painters around Pieter van Laer who are commonly referred to as the ‘Bamboccianti’. The Bamboccianti brought existing traditions of depicting peasant subjects from sixteenth-century Netherlandish art with them to Italy and generally created small cabinet paintings or etchings of the everyday life of the lower classes in Rome and its countryside.

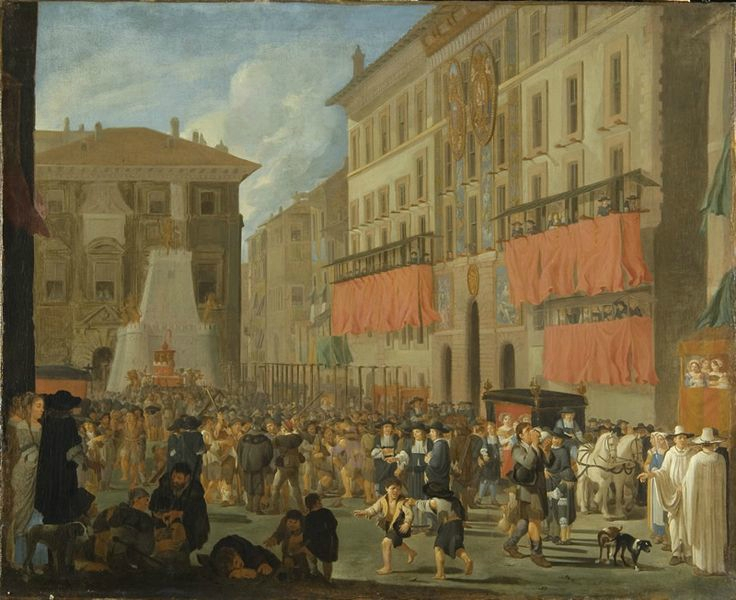
Celebration on the Piazza di Spagna

It is not clear when Reuter travelled to Rome where he resided in the "casa dei pittori fiamminghi" near the Piazza del Popolo. The first documentary proof of his presence in Rome is the registration of his marriage to the local woman Anna Previtali in 1672 but he must have arrived in the city some years earlier.

Like his master Sweerts, he linked up with the Bamboccianti genre painters in Rome. He may also have become a member of the Bentvueghels, an association of mainly Dutch and Flemish artists working in Rome. His wife died in 1678 and the next year he joined the 'Congregazione dei Virtuosi al Pantheon', with the Dutch Bamboccianti painter Dirck Helmbreker acting as his sponsor. The Congregazione counted among its members many important artists who left their mark in Rome.

== Work ==
Only a small number of paintings have been ascribed to Willem Reuter with any level of certainty. His chronology is difficult to determine as he never dated his work. His paintings usually depict market scenes or processions in Roman piazzas and occasionally historic or religious events set in landscape settings. An example of a depiction of a historical event is the Celebration on the Piazza di Spagna, which probably depicts the birth of the Spanish infant Don Carlos in the year 1661 (in the collection of the Academy of Fine Arts Vienna, Vienna in 1992).

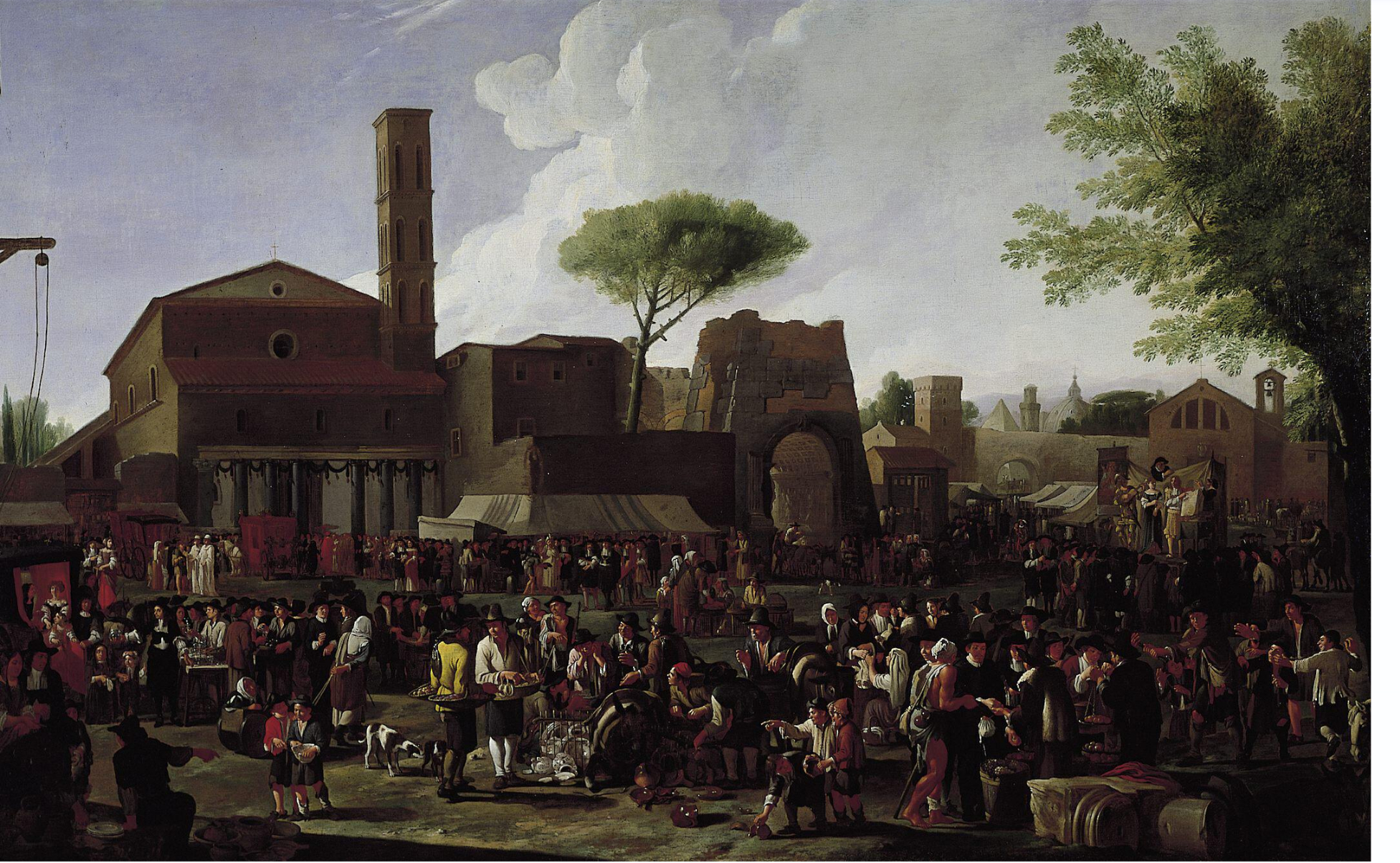
A Roman market

Willem Reuter’s Roman panoramic market scene dated 1669 referred to as A Roman market (Norton Simon Museum) is an example of his bustling market scenes. The picture is built up of many different scenes and anecdotes such as a commedia dell’arte performance, a beggar receiving alms and an overturned cart carrying fragile crockery. The carefully orchestrated composition of the work makes each event clearly legible. In particular, the vertically-oriented buildings provide a stable backdrop for the loosely arranged groupings of people placed on the piazza's background to foreground. A strong light helps clarify the figures and their interactions.

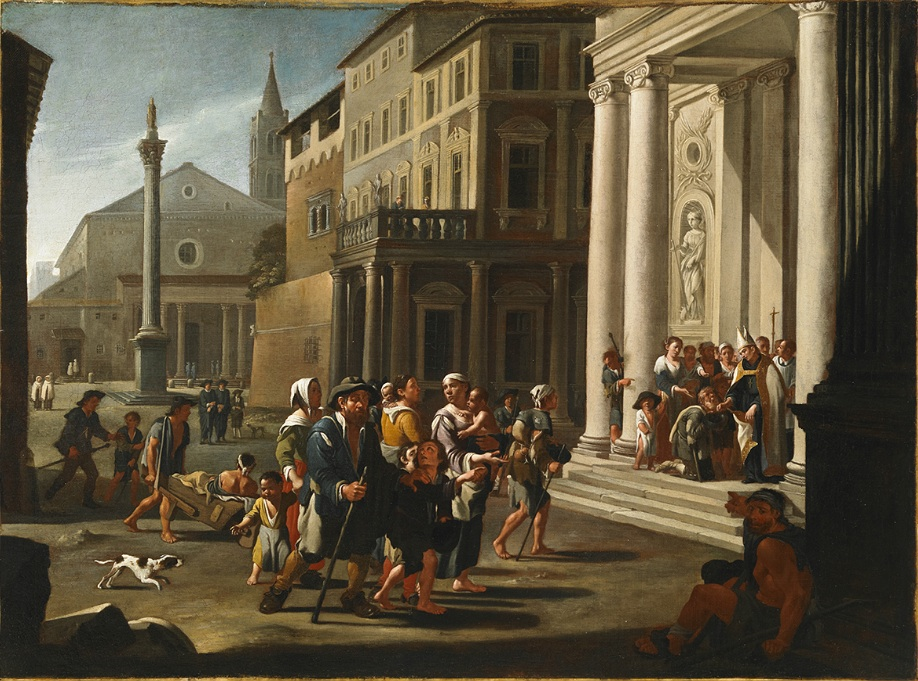
Townscape with a bishop healing the sick and injured in front of a church

His work, although superficially similar to the Bamboccianti in the use of Roman settings populated with many figures, can be distinguished from the paintings of this group of genre painters, as Reuter did not adopt the typology of the Bamboccianti and represents the cityscape more in the form of a veduta. Unlike other Bamboccianti, Reuter paid more attention to the precise rendering of nature. He borrowed from his master Sweerts (who was in turn influenced by Caravaggio) the use of chiaroscuro and a preference for the use of red tones. Like Sweerts, Reuter was able to convey a tranquil mood by catching his figures engaged in their daily activities in sharply angled light. His work also shows classicist tendencies, with statuesque figures placed in architectural settings or idealized landscapes, and this was probably the reason why one of his works was formerly attributed to Nicolas Poussin.

He influenced Peeter Bolckman.
