= Pieter van Laer =

Dutch painter (1599–c. 1641)

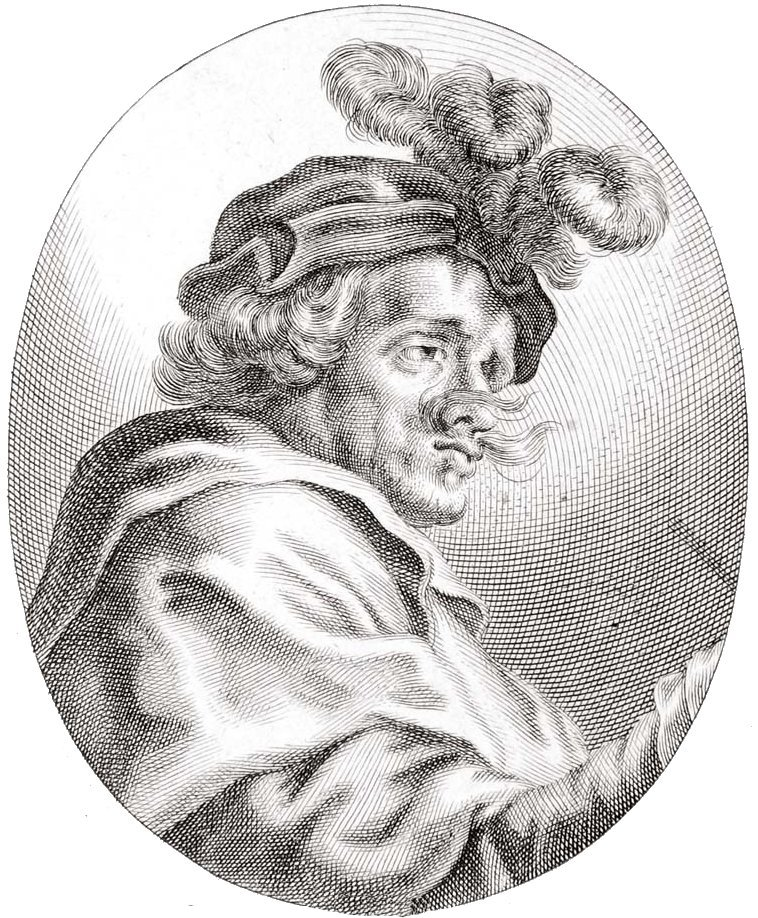
- Born: 1599; Haarlem, the Dutch Republic
- Died: c. 1645 (aged c. 46)
- Known for: Painting

Pieter Bodding van Laer (christened 14 December 1599, in Haarlem – 1641 or later) was a Dutch painter and printmaker. He was active in Rome for over a decade and was known for genre scenes, animal paintings and landscapes placed in the environs of Rome.

Pieter van Laer was an active member of the association of Flemish and Dutch artists in Rome known as the Bentvueghels. His nickname in this group ("bent name") was Il Bamboccio. The style of genre painting he introduced was followed by other Northern and Italian painters. These followers became known as the Bamboccianti and a painting in this style as a Bambocciata (plural: Bambocciate).

== Life ==
Pieter van Laer was born in Haarlem as the second child of Jacob Claesz. Boddingh of Haarlem and Magdalena Heyns of Antwerp. He adopted the surname van Laer only later in life. This surname was probably taken from his brother's godfather. He came from a well to do family and his parents operated a private school in Haarlem started by Magdalena's father, the well-known writer and publisher Peeter Heyns, after whom Pieter van Laer was named.

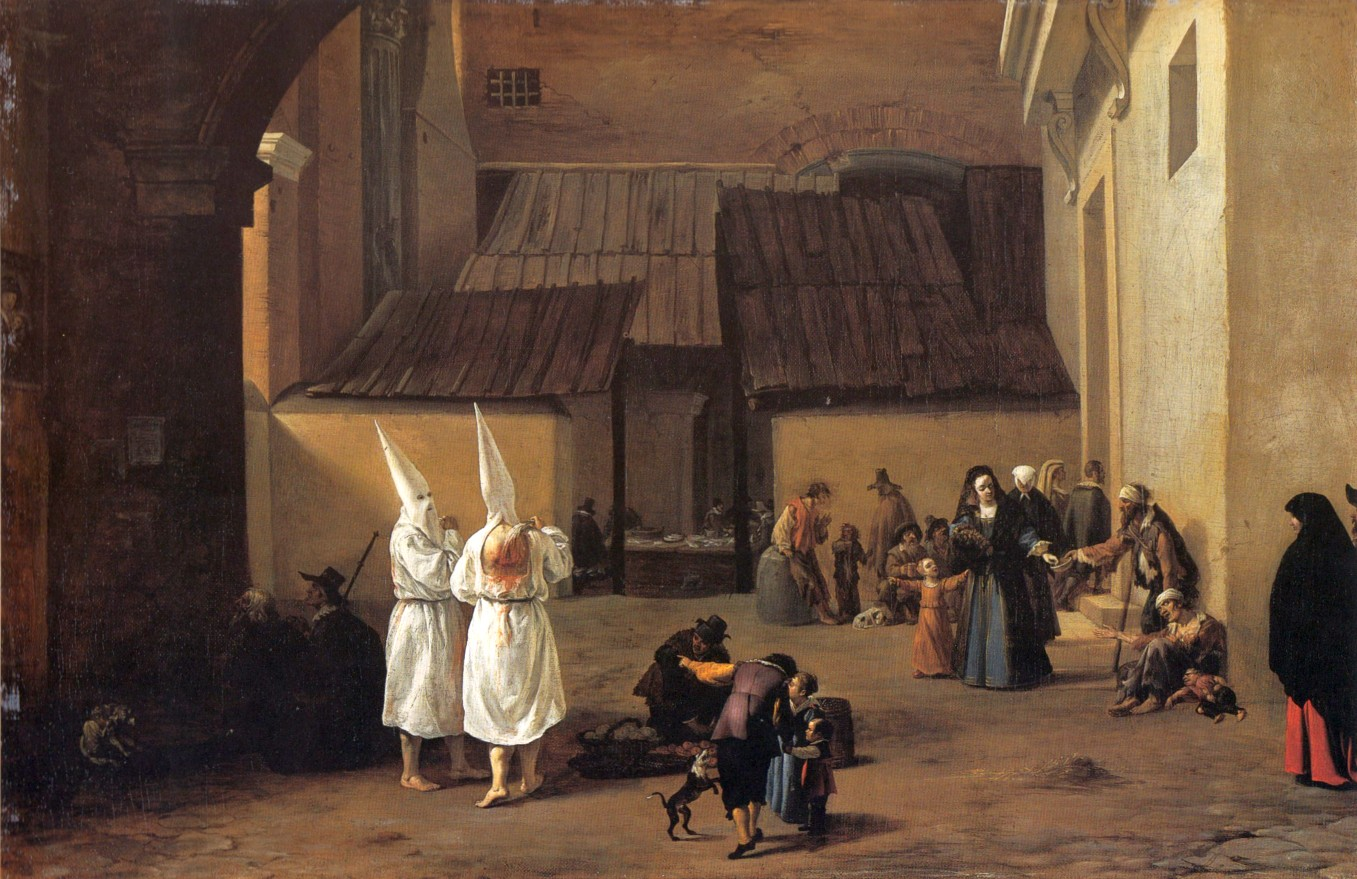
The flagellants

His older brother was Roedolff van Laer, who also became a painter and was known as Roeland van Laer and Orlando van Laer. His youngest brother Nicolaes Bodding became known later in life as Nicolaes Boddingius and was a prominent schoolmaster and minister. He also had two sisters called Barbara and Anthoynetta

Pieter van Laer was possibly a pupil of Esaias van de Velde in Haarlem. His early work shows the influence of this painter as is evidenced by a drawing signed Pieter Bodink (formerly in the collection of A. Welcker), which is close to van de Velde's style. He traveled to Rome in 1625 via France, likely in the company of his brother Roeland. In 1626 their father is also recorded in Rome as a witness to a will. Here he became a member of the Bentvueghels, an association of mostly Flemish and Dutch artists in Rome who were known for their initiation rituals, which involved a lot of drinking. Pieter van Laer's nickname in Italy was Il Bamboccio, which means "ugly doll" or "puppet". This was an allusion to van Laer's ungainly appearance, as he is said to have had unusually long legs, short chest and almost no neck. Pieter van Laer was also known for his pointed moustache. Van Laer shared a home in the Via Margutta with Jean Ducamps, whose pupil he is said to have been according to certain art historians. However, such apprenticeship is unlikely since the two artists had approximately the same age. He was also a close friend of Joachim von Sandrart in Rome.

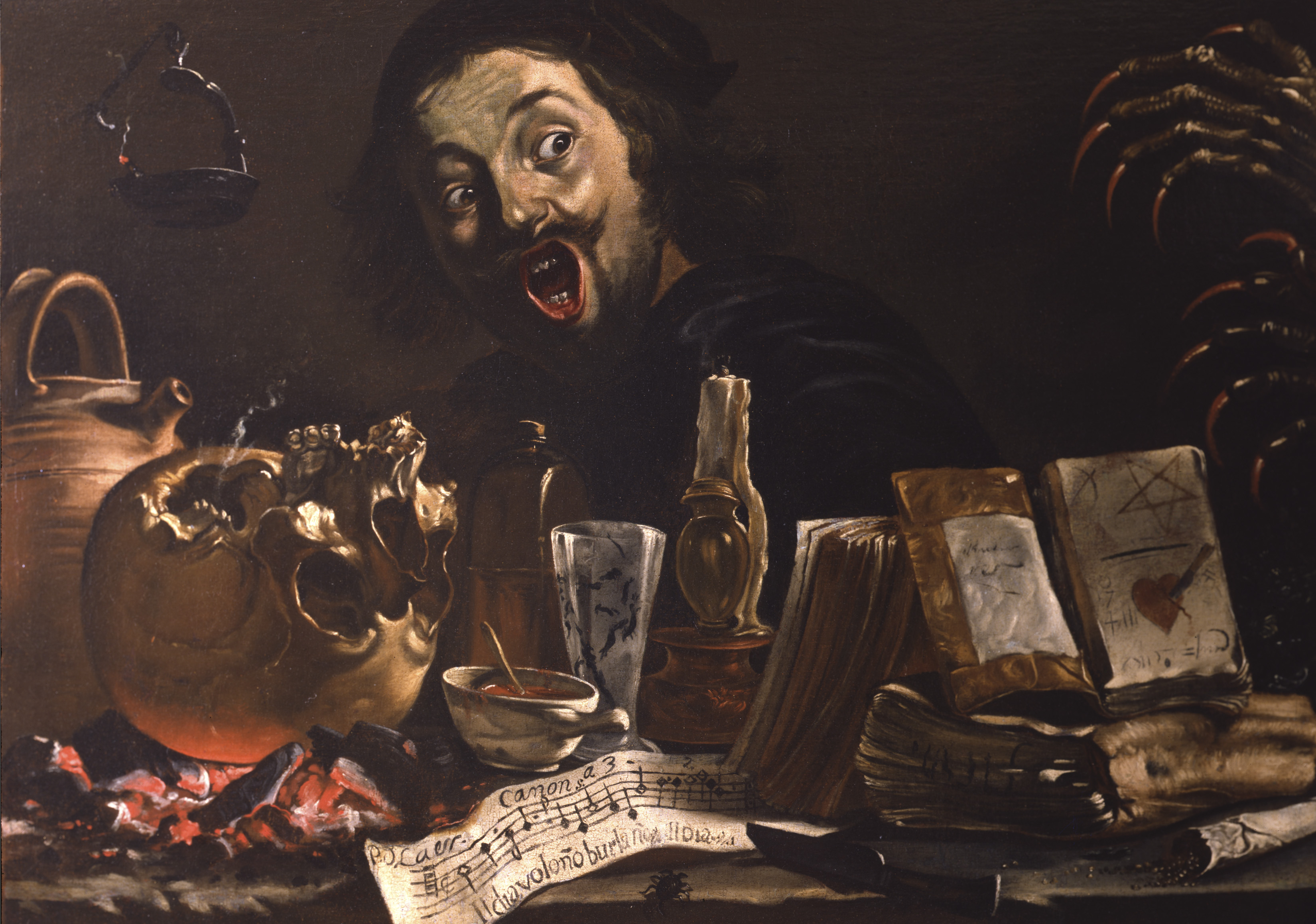
Magic scene with self-portrait

Through the works he created in Rome Pieter van Laer initiated a new style of genre painting. Paintings in this new style were named Bambocciate after his nickname. He became the inspiration and focal point around which likeminded artists congregated during his stay in Italy. The initial Bamboccianti included Jan Miel, Andries and Jan Both, Karel Dujardin, Johannes Lingelbach and the Italian Michelangelo Cerquozzi. The Frenchman Sébastien Bourdon was also associated with this group during his early career. Other Bamboccianti include Michiel Sweerts, Thomas Wijck, Dirck Helmbreker, Jan Asselyn, Anton Goubau, Willem Reuter, Jacob van Staverden and Johan Filip Lemke.

Pieter van Laer had a successful career in Rome. He returned to the Netherlands c. 1639. Here he lived chiefly in Amsterdam and later in Haarlem with his younger brother Nicolaes. The date, place and cause of van Laer's death are unknown. It must have occurred after 1641 when he is known to have made a drawing in a Haarlem song book. It is believed he travelled back to Italy around that time. According to a statement in the testament of his sister made in 1654 there had not been any signs of life from Pieter van Laer in the previous 12 years. The Italian biographer Giovanni Battista Passeri stated that van Laer died in the fall of 1642. The Dutch biographer Arnold Houbraken reported that van Laer became depressed at the end of his life and committed suicide by drowning.

== Work ==
Pieter van Laer is mainly known for his genre scenes set in Italianate landscapes as well as for his landscapes and animal scenes. He also painted some battle scenes. He further engraved a number of plates of animals. He was one of the first artists to develop the painting of cattle as a specialist genre. He left one painting with a religious theme, the Annunciation to the shepherds (Museum Bredius, The Hague). This composition is also van Laer's earliest surviving cattle painting. His paintings were typically of a small format.

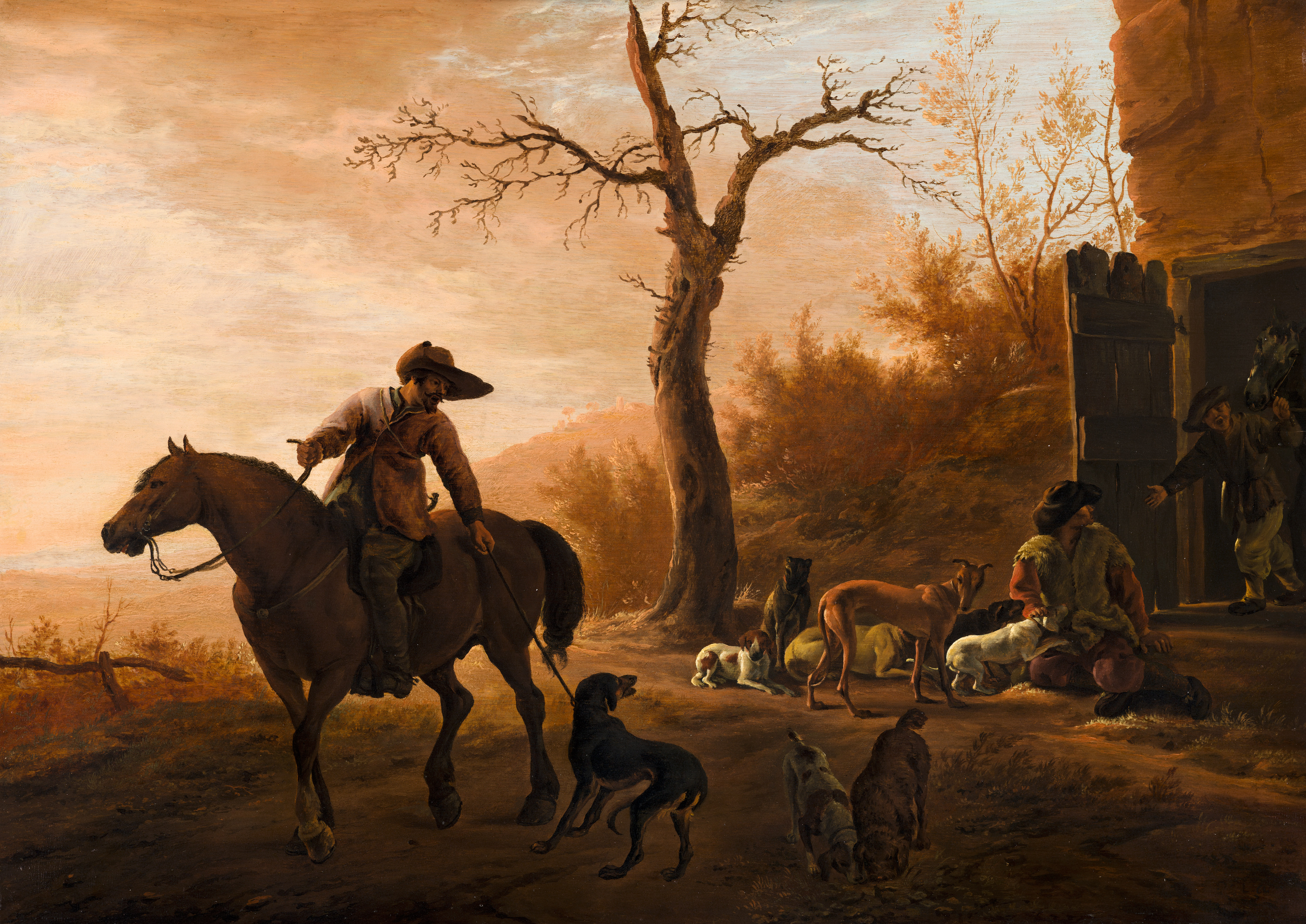
Landscape with Hunters

The influence of a long stay in Rome is seen in his treatment of landscape and backgrounds. One of his important contributions is the introduction to Roman painting of new subjects derived from Flemish and Dutch genre paintings including according to a contemporary source, "rogues, cheats, pickpockets, bands of drunks and gluttons, scabby tobacconists, barbers, and other 'sordid' subjects." His subjects also included blacksmiths shoeing horses in grottoes, travelers in front of inns, brigands attacking travelers, military actions, idlers around Roman lime-kilns, markets, feasts and scenes with hunters. He further depicted people playing popular games of chance such as morra as well as excretory functions. Several of his compositions deal with lively scenes from peasant life. His pictures are marked by skillful composition and good drawing. He was especially careful in perspective. Despite their lowly subject matter, van Laer's works themselves sold for high prices and were held in some of the most prestigious collections of his time.

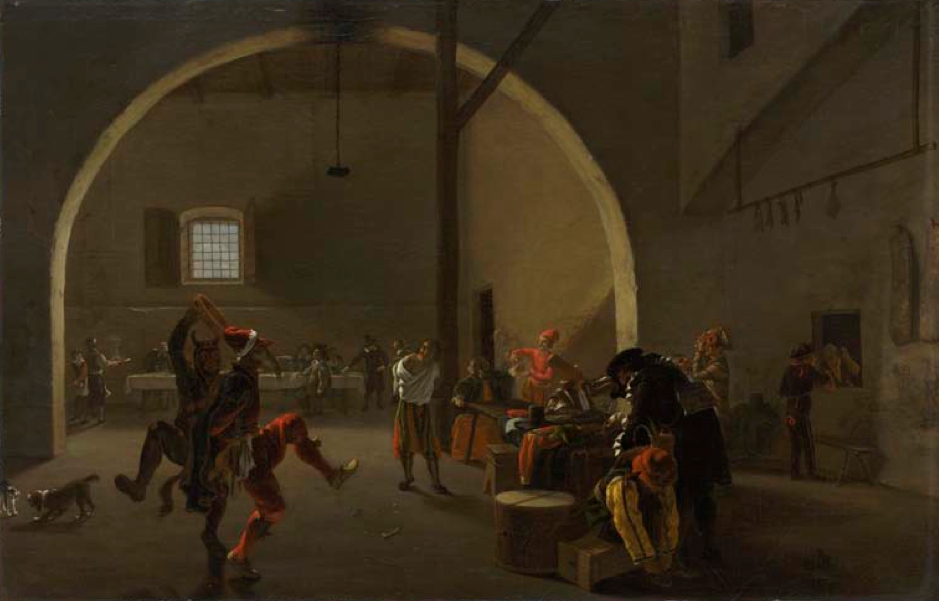
Carnival revellers in a tavern

The traditional art historical view was that the Bamboccianti style practised by Pieter van Laer offered a realist "true portrait of Rome and its popular life without variation or alteration" of what the artist sees. However, their contemporaries did not generally regard the Bamboccianti as realists. An alternative view of the art of the Bamboccianti is that their works constitute complex allegories that provide a commentary on classical art with a view to bringing the observer to contemplate elevated ideas. They thus stand in a long tradition of paradox in which low or vulgar subjects were the vehicle for conveying important philosophical meanings.

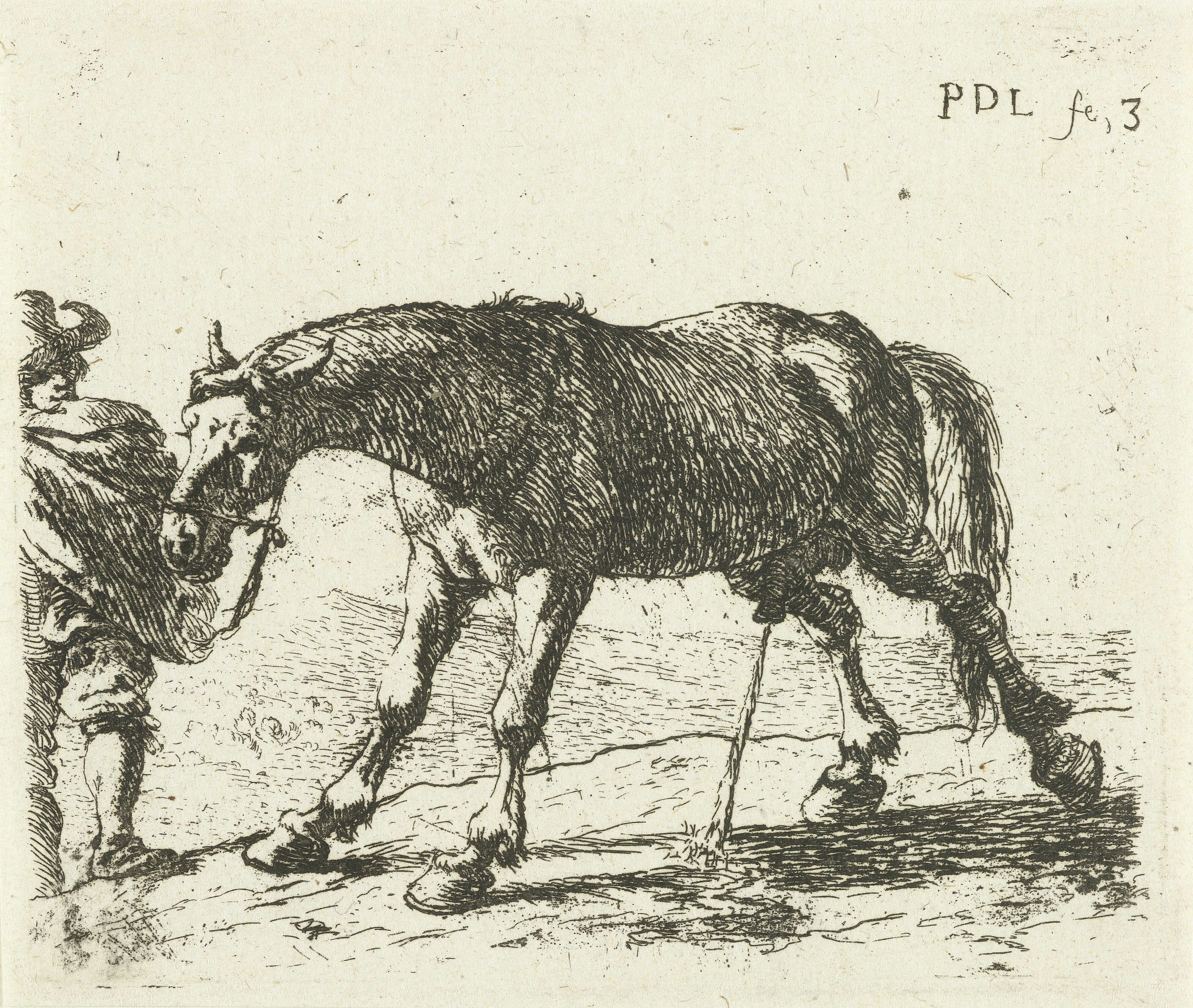
Urinating horse

While his style of painting was openly disdained by pre-eminent Italian painters in Rome and Bologna, such as Sacchi, Albani, and Reni, this did not translate into a poverty of commissions. In fact, van Laer paintings over time became highly sought after. Initially, the painter must have depended on an open market and dealers, rather than commissions for sales. However, within a decade of work in Rome, he could ask a very respectable price for his paintings. Among those owning his work were Pietro Testa, Cassiano dal Pozzo, the marchese Vincenzo Giustiniani, and later, the Flemish merchant in Naples Gaspar Roomer.

Pieter van Laer was an accomplished printmaker and he produced two series of prints of animals. One series of 8 plates of domestic animals published in 1636 in Rome under the title Various animals was dedicated to Don Ferdinando Afan de Ribera, the Spanish Viceroy in Naples. This series of engravings had an important influence on the Dutch animal painter Paulus Potter, in particular the way in which van Laer was able to place figures, animals, buildings and trees in a coherent pictorial space. A second set of 6 plates was entitled Horses and depicts the bleak lot of horses belonging to poor peasants.
