= The Ham Dinner =

1735 painting by Nicolas Lancret

The Afternoon Meal
- Le Déjeuner de jambon (French)
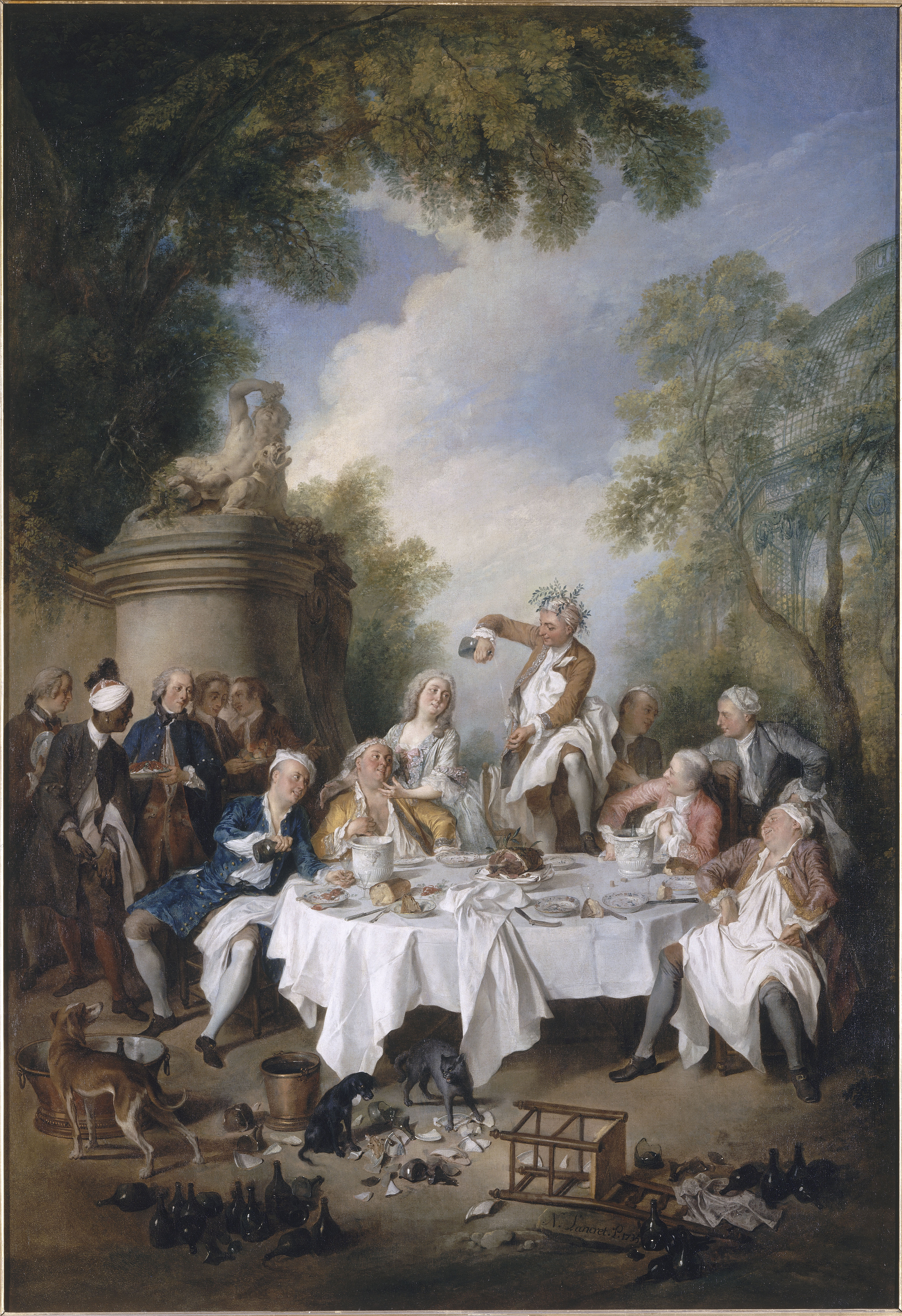
- Artist: Nicolas Lancret
- Year: 1735
- Medium: oil on canvas
- Dimensions: 188 cm × 123 cm (74 in × 48 in)
- Location: Musée Condé, Chantilly

The Ham Dinner (French - Le Déjeuner de jambon) is an oil-on-canvas painting created in 1735 by French artist Nicolas Lancret.

It and de Troy's The Oyster Dinner were commissioned by Louis XV to decorate the dining room of the lesser apartments at the Palace of Versailles. Both works are now in the Musée Condé, in Chantilly.

== History ==
This painting was commissioned in 1734 by King Louis XV from the painter Lancret, for the dining room of the small apartments at the Palace of Versailles, who produced it the following year. A receipt is issued in his name for the sum of 2,400 pounds for the production of this painting. It was the counterpart to Jean-François de Troy's Oyster Lunch. The canvas is then embedded in woodwork. It was in place in 1737 and appears in the inventory of the royal collections at that date. But from 1768, the paintings left the apartments following their reorganization in office rooms and kitchens. In 1784, the paintings are present at the superintendence of the castle.

During the French Revolution, the painting was seized and sent to the Central Museum of Arts, ancestor of the Louvre Museum. During the Restoration, in 1817, Louis-Philippe I, then Duke of Orléans, claimed the work as well as its counterpart. He declared that these two works come from the collection of his ancestor, the Regent Philippe II, Duke of Orléans, his ancestor, when in reality they never belonged to him. Louis-Philippe sent the two paintings, as well as Le Déjeuner de Chasse, recovered in the same way to his Château d'Eu. His son, the Duke of Aumale acquired it in 1857, during the sale of his father's collections in London. He also obtained the two pendants that were withdrawn from sale: The Ham Dinner was acquired for 4,000 francs. He installed them in his property of Orleans House in Twickenham. These paintings had a sentimental value for him: his father described to him the names of the characters represented here. According to Jules Guiffrey, it was Philippe d'Orléans, known as le Gros, feasting within the Society of Cotton Bonnets. But apart from the fact that this identification is impossible because of the late date of the painting, art historians today doubt that it could represent characters who really existed. Indeed, the Société des Bonnets de coton was founded in 1760 while Lancret died in 1743 and the Chantilly painting is dated 1735.

Returning to France in 1871, the Duke of Aumale exhibited it in the large gallery of his Château de Chantilly, currently owned by the Institut de France.

The Museum of Fine Arts, Boston has a smaller scale version, probably executed in the same year.

== See also ==
1648 Flemish painting of nearly the same name by David Teniers the Younger
