= Italian Comedians by a Fountain =

Painting by Nicholas Lancret

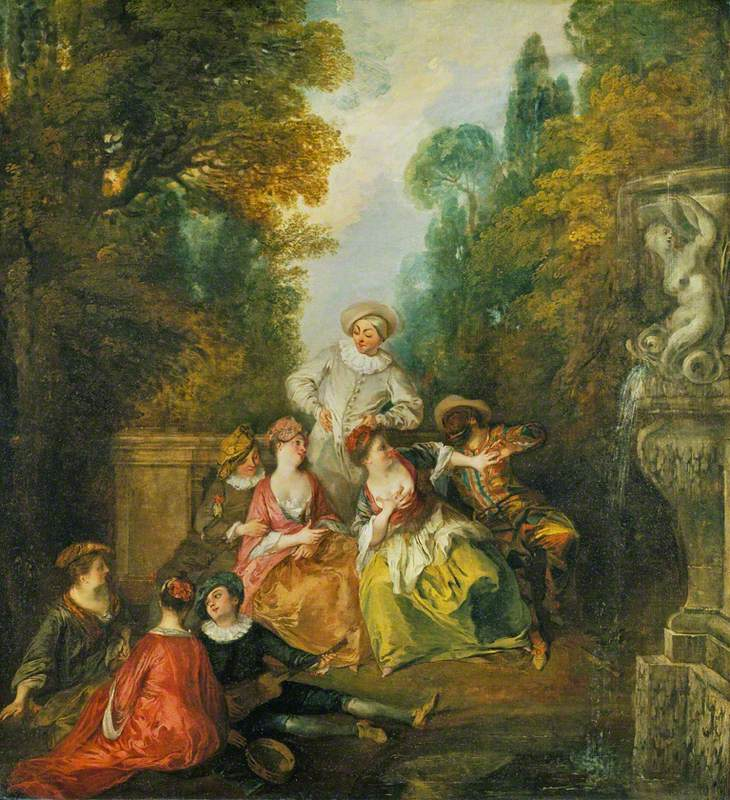
- Artist: Nicolas Lancret
- Year: c.1718
- Type: Oil on canvas, Fête galante
- Dimensions: 91 cm × 83 cm (36 in × 33 in)
- Location: Wallace Collection; London

Italian Comedians by a Fountain is a c.1718 oil painting by the French artist Nicolas Lancret. It features a group of figures from Commedia dell'arte, shown in an idyllic garden scene by a fountain. Produced during the French Regency it reflects the style of the Fête galante, popular during the era popularised by Jean-Antoine Watteau. It was displayed at the Art Treasures Exhibition in Manchester in 1957. The painting was acquired by the British art collector Marquess of Hertford in 1863. It is now part of the Wallace Collection in London, noted for its French paintings.

== Bibliography ==
- Davis, Frank. Victorian Patrons of the Arts: Twelve Famous Collections and Their Owners. Country Life, 1963.
- Holmes, Mary Tavener. Nicolas Lancret. H.N. Abrams, 1991.
- Ingamells, John. The Wallace Collection: French Nineteenth Century. Trustees of the Wallace Collection, 1985.
- Pergam, Elizabeth A. The Manchester Art Treasures Exhibition of 1857. Routledge, 2017.
