= The Oyster Dinner =

Painting by Jean-François de Troy

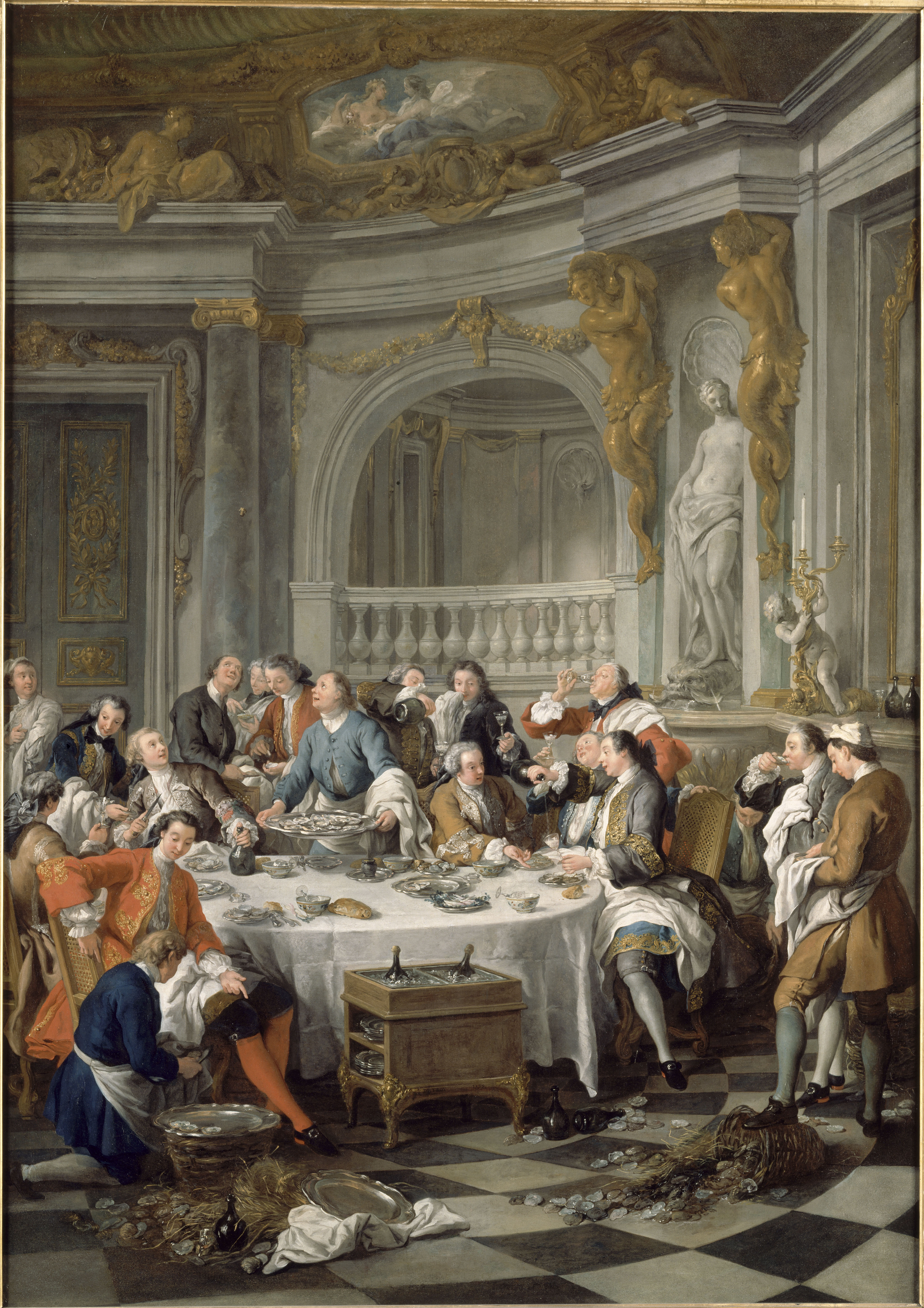
- Artist: Jean-François de Troy
- Year: 1735
- Medium: oil on canvas
- Dimensions: 180 cm × 126 cm (71 in × 50 in)
- Location: Musée Condé, Chantilly

The Oyster Dinner (French - Le Déjeuner d'huîtres) is a 1735 painting by Jean-François de Troy. It and Nicolas Lancret's The Ham Dinner were commissioned by Louis XV to decorate the dining room in the lesser apartments at the Palace of Versailles. It includes the first appearance of a champagne bottle in painting. Both paintings are now in the Musée Condé, in Chantilly.

== Historical ==
This painting was commissioned by King Louis XV from the painter Jean-François de Troy, for the dining room of the small apartments of the Palace of Versailles, who produced it in 1735. At the same time, he produced two other paintings for the king's apartments : Le Déjeuner de Chasse (Musée du Louvre), as well as a Deer at bay. For the first painting, the painter was only paid on January 20, 1738 by the sum of 2,400 pounds. In apartments, it was the counterpart to Nicolas Lancret's Déjeuner de Jamon. It was in place in 1737 and appears in the inventory of the royal collections at that date. But from 1768, the paintings left the apartments following their reorganization in office rooms and kitchens. In 1784, the paintings were present at the superintendence of the castle.

During the French Revolution, the painting was seized and sent to the Central Museum of Arts, ancestor of the Louvre Museum. During the Restoration, in 1817, Louis-Philippe I, then Duke of Orléans, claimed the work as well as its pendant because, according to him (wrongly), they came from the collection of the Regent Philippe II, Duke of Orléans, his ancestor. He sent the two paintings, as well as Le Déjeuner de Chasse, recovered in the same way to his Château d'Eu. His son, the Duke of Aumale acquired it in 1857 during the sale of his father's collections in London. He also obtained the two pendants that were withdrawn from sale: the Déjeuner d'huître was acquired for 3,000 francs. He installed them in his property of Orleans House in Twickenham. These paintings have a sentimental value for him: his father described to him the names of the characters represented here, even if art historians doubt today that they can represent characters who really existed. Returning to France in 1871, he exhibited it in the large gallery of his Château de Chantilly, currently owned by the Institut de France.

The painting has undergone transformations: originally integrated into the woodwork, it was given a more regular form. It finally underwent a complete cleaning in 2000, with the repair of uplifts and yellowing, as well as the removal of repaints in several places.

== Description and analysis ==
The painting depicts an aristocratic meal scene in a richly decorated room. It represents an oyster lunch accompanied by champagne. Four figures look up at a popping champagne cork against the backdrop of the marble column. The painting is a documentary element for the knowledge of tableware in the 18th century: coolers, porcelain, salt shakers. The table in the center of the room is round, to avoid Etiquette usage. The chairs are caned, the dishes are silver. The bottles of champagne, more stocky than nowadays, are placed on the table. The glasses are placed in small porcelain coolers from China or Japan. In front of the table, a sideboard is used to keep bottles cool in ice and to store plates. This is undoubtedly one of the oldest representations of sparkling wine, invented at the end of the 17th century.

The guests savored only one dish: oysters, very fashionable at that time, served with butter, salt or garlic. They are young lackeys with a towel at the waist who open the oysters for the guests. According to medical works of the time, oysters were then renowned for their aphrodisiac virtues: this belief could explain why the painting depicts only men and not a single woman, unlike its counterpart, Le Déjeuner de Jamon. This masculine exclusivity can also be explained by the fact that it was intended for the decoration of a dining room "back from the hunt", essentially occupied by men. This is the first dining room in the Palace of Versailles specially fitted out for this purpose, as previously the table was set in any room.

The decor of the room, sumptuous, takes up in its upper part a work by Jean-François de Troy himself: it is Zephyr and Flora (private collection, around 1725-1726). It is reproduced inverted, above a door, the painter thus doing his own advertising.

== Sources ==
- Garnier-Pelle, Nicole (1995). Chantilly, musée Condé. Peintures du xviiie siècle. Inventaire des collections publiques de France (in French). Paris: Réunion des musées nationaux. OCLC 33264438.
