= The Happy Family (painting) =

Painting by Jan Steen

- Het vrolijke huisgezin (Dutch)
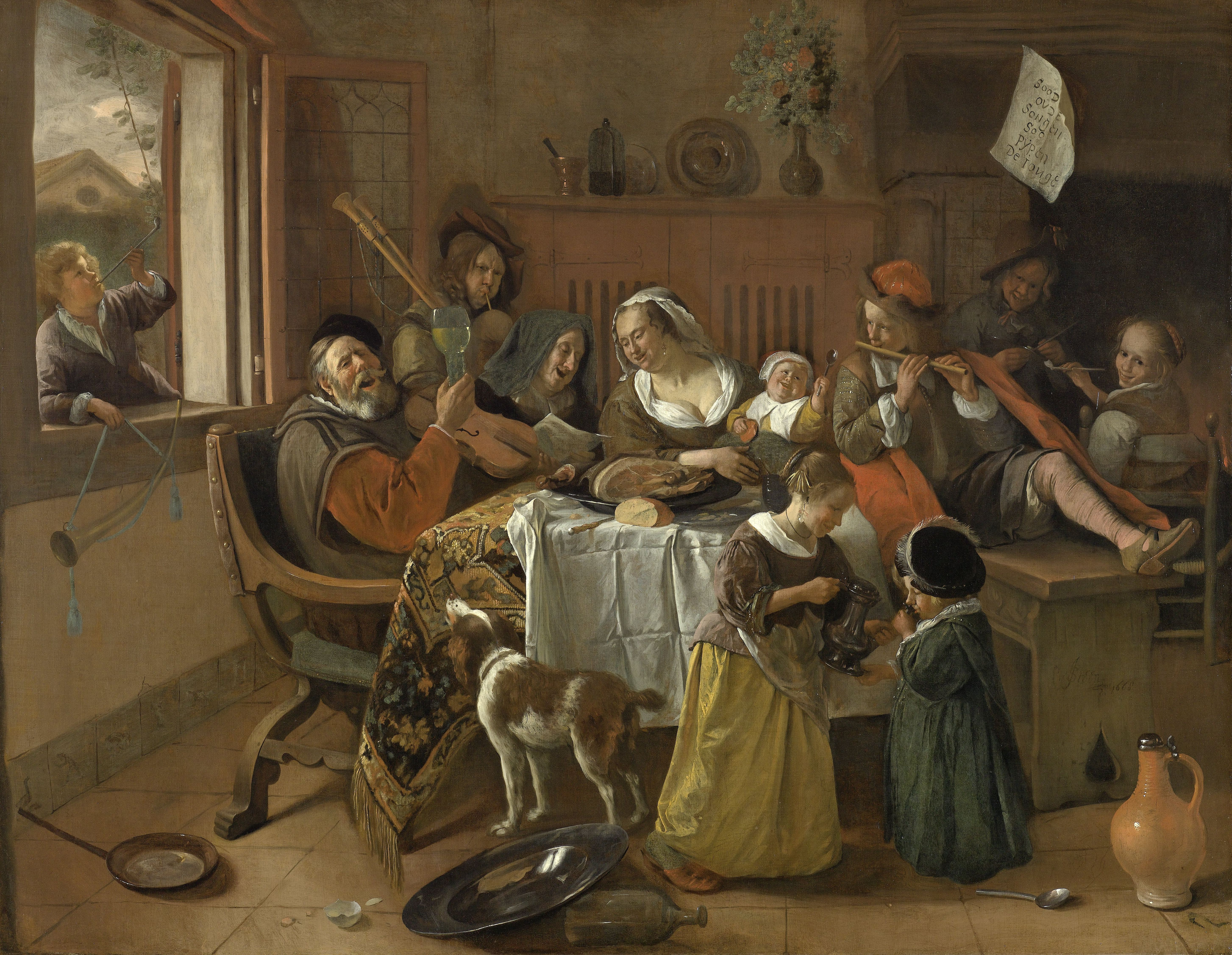
- Artist: Jan Steen
- Year: 1668
- Medium: Oil on canvas
- Dimensions: 110.5 cm × 141 cm (43.5 in × 56 in)
- Location: Rijksmuseum, Amsterdam

The Happy Family (Dutch: Het vrolijke huisgezin) or As the Old Sing, So shall the Young Pipe (Soo de ouden songen, so pijpen de jongen) is a 1668 oil painting by the Dutch artist Jan Steen. It is now in the Rijksmuseum in Amsterdam.

The painting depicts a merry family evening where the head of the family, assisted by copious amounts of drink, is in full voice, backed up by the mother and grandmother. The children join in on musical instruments.

The moral of the picture, as given away by the note hanging from the mantelpiece reading "So de ouden songen, so pijpen de jongen" ("as the old sing, so shall the young pipe"), is that children will learn their codes of behaviour from their parents.

== Bibliography ==
- (in Dutch) H. Perry Chapman, Wouter Th. Kloek & Arthur K. Wheelock, Jr. (1996) Jan Steen. Schilder en verteller, p. 172
