= Nicolas Lancret =

French painter (1690–1743)

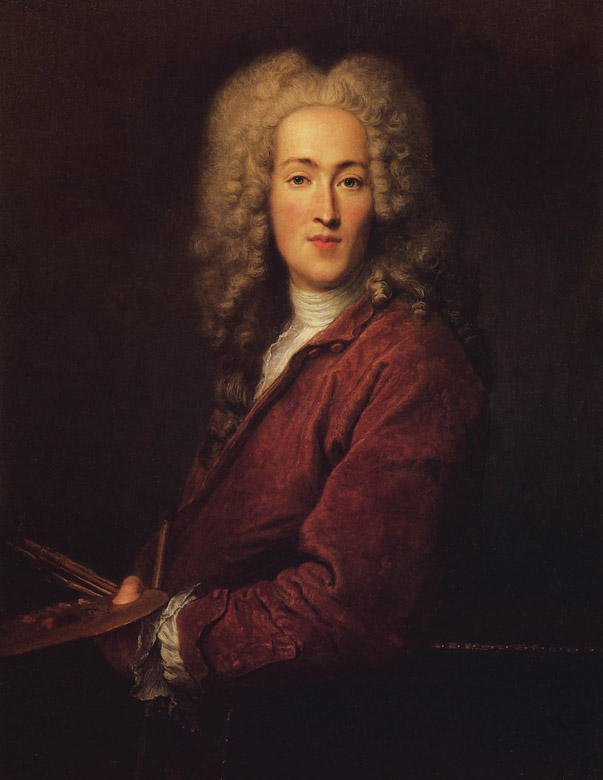
- Lancret (self-portrait)
- Born: 22 January 1690; Paris, France
- Died: 14 September 1743; Paris, France
- Known for: Painting

Nicolas Lancret (French: [nikɔla lɑ̃kʁɛ]; 22 January 1690 – 14 September 1743) was a French painter. Born in Paris, he was a brilliant depicter of light comedy which reflected the tastes and manners of French society during the regency of the Duke of Orleans and, later, early reign of King Louis XV.

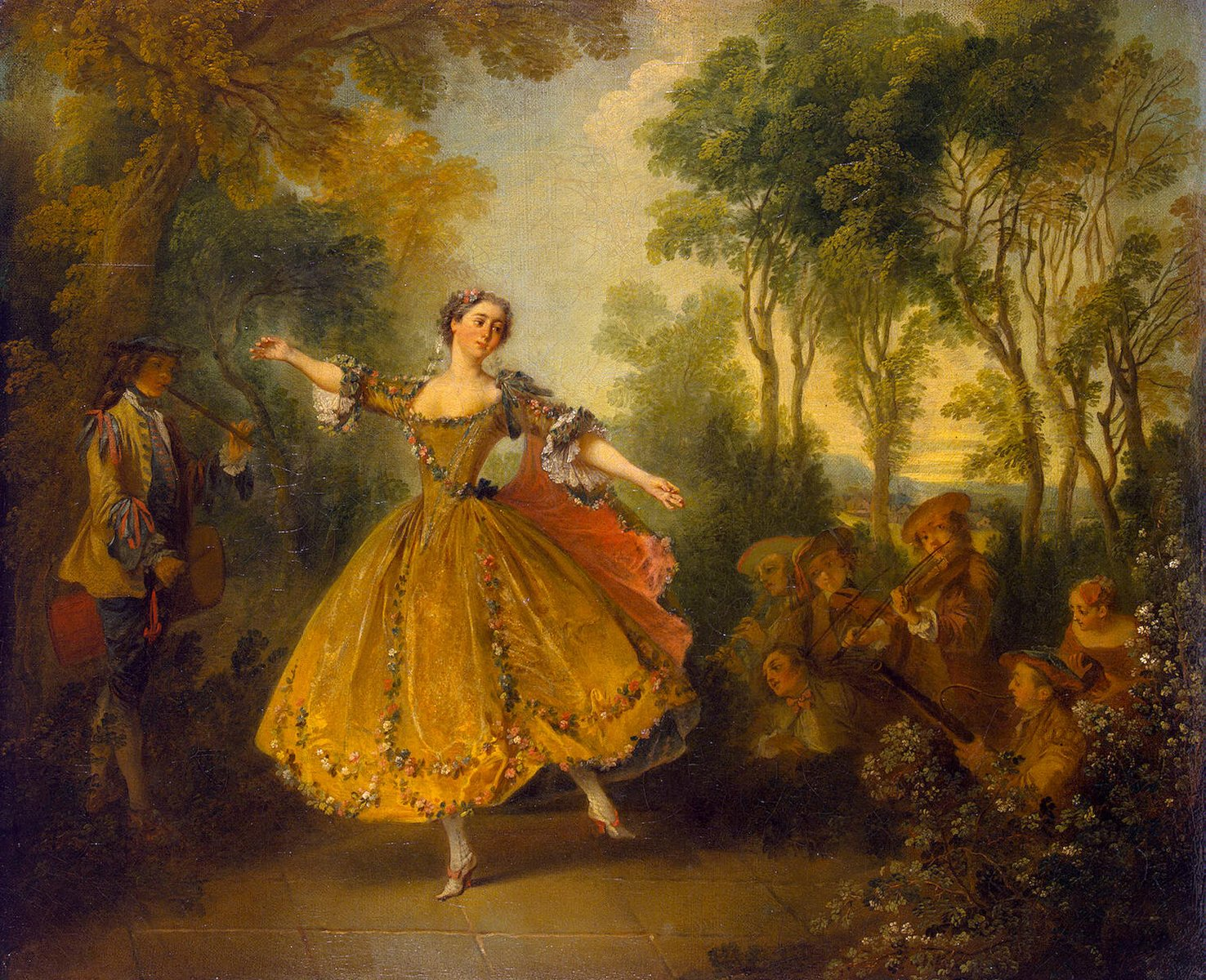
Marie-Anne de Camargo (a famous dancer), 1730

== Career ==
Lancret's first master was Pierre d'Ulin, but his acquaintance with and admiration for Watteau induced him to leave Ulin for Gillot, whose pupil Watteau had been. Lancret, who remained a pupil of Gillot from 1712 to 1713, was heavily influenced by the older painter, whose typical slender figures can be found in many of his pupil's younger works. Two pictures painted by Lancret and exhibited on the Place Dauphine had a great success, which laid the foundation of his fortune, and, it is said, estranged Watteau, who had been complimented as their author. In 1718 he was received as an Academician, from thereon becoming a very respected artist, especially among the admirers of Watteau. He completed works to decorate the Palace of Versailles, while his style was later to prove popular with Frederick the Great. Lancret's popularity was reflected by the decision to make him a councillor at the Academie in 1735.

== Work, style and legacy ==
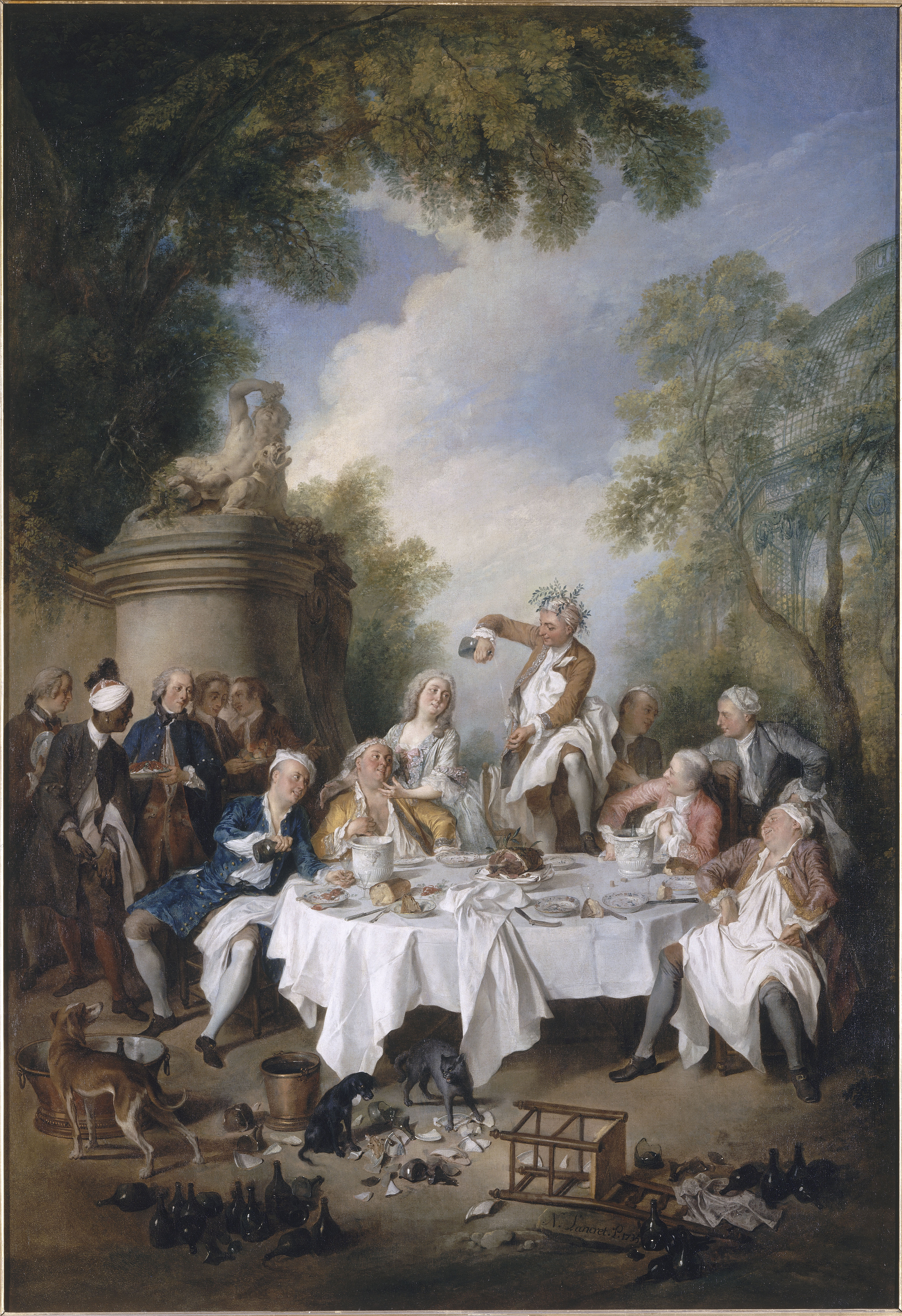
Le Déjeuner de jambon, Chantilly, musée Condé, 1735

Lancret completed numerous paintings, a significant proportion of which (over eighty) were engraved. Although he completed several portraits and historical pieces his favourite subjects were balls, fairs, village weddings and so forth. In this respect he was typical of Rococo artists. Some have claimed Lancret's work is significantly inferior to that of Watteau. In drawing and in painting his touch is often considered intelligent but dry; art historian Michael Levey remarked that Lancret was 'no poet but a charming essayist'. Lancret's characteristics are due possibly to the fact that he had been for some time in training under an engraver.

It is generally considered that the artist produced his best work towards the latter end of his life, displaying, in the minds of several art historians, an increasing ability to create a sense of harmony between art and nature, as in Montreir de lanterne magique, and a willingness to lend his, now bulkier, figures a firmer place in his compositions. These changes displayed the influence of later Watteaus like L'Enseigne de Gersaint. Lancret's last painting, Family in a Garden, The National Gallery, is considered by Levey to be his 'masterpiece'. The scene, which depicts a family taking coffee, has an intimacy and hint of humour that are considered captivating. The work's flowing lines, Rococoesque harmony of pastel colours, painterly style and charming subject matter (of a wide eyed young girl, surrounded by her happy family and natural, yet un-threatening setting, trying her first taste of coffee) are seen to display a delicate sense of vitality and freshness that anticipate the works of both Thomas Gainsborough and Jean-Honoré Fragonard.

The British Museum possesses an admirable series of studies by Lancret in red chalk, and the National Gallery, London, shows four paintings—the "Four Ages of Man" (engraved by Desplaces and l'Armessin), cited by d'Argenville among the principal works of Lancret.

== Personal life ==
Lancret was single for much of his life; however in 1741 he married the 18-year-old grandchild of Boursault, author of Aesop at Court. Supposedly Lancret was induced to marry her after finding her and her dying mother living in poverty in an attic room and hearing that the daughter was soon to be compelled to enter a convent. Lancret died of pneumonia on 14 September 1743.

== Gallery ==
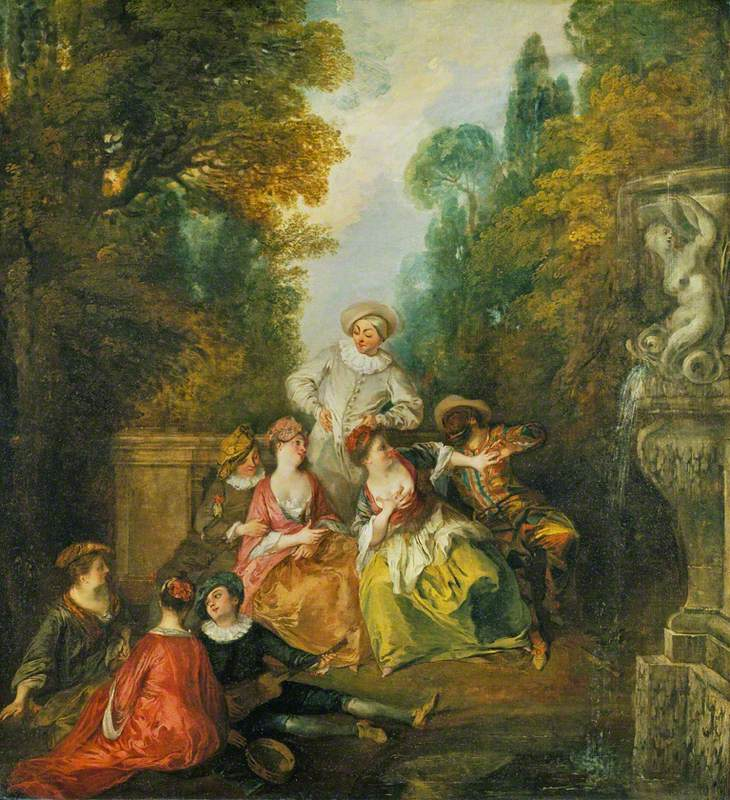
Italian Comedians by a Fountain, Wallace Collection, 1718

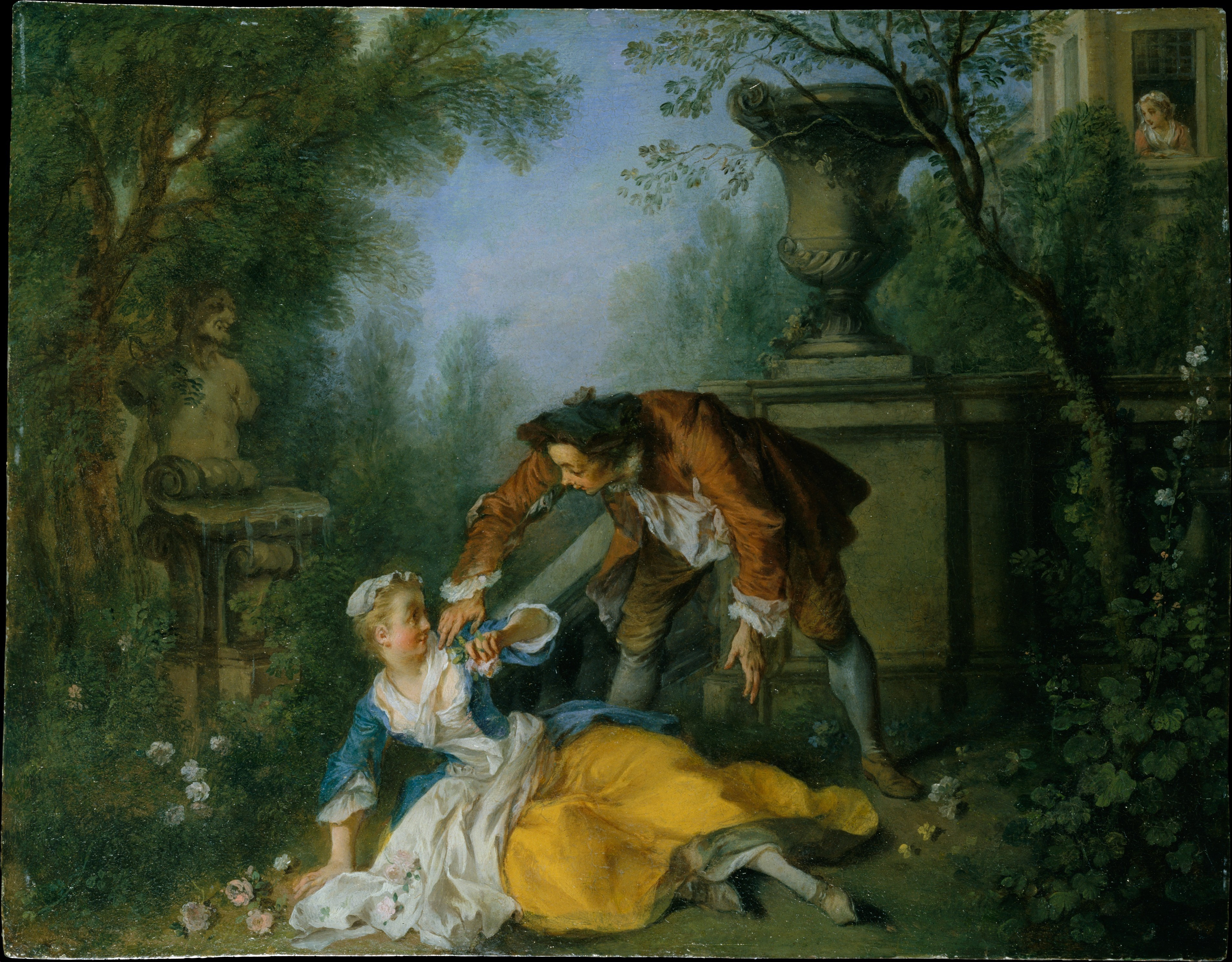
La Servante justifiée, 1735-1740 Metropolitan Museum

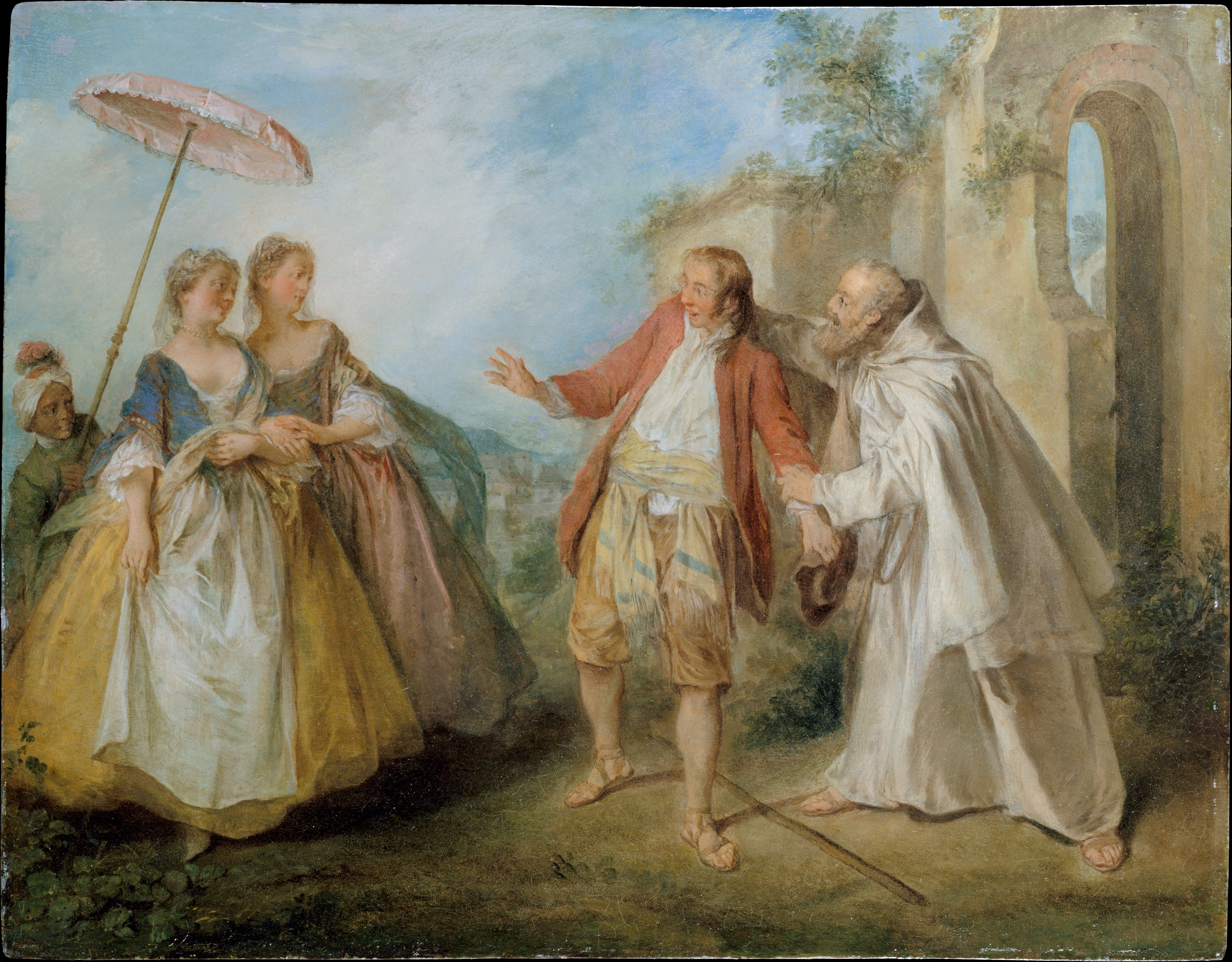
Les oies du père Philippe, c 1736 Metropolitan Museum

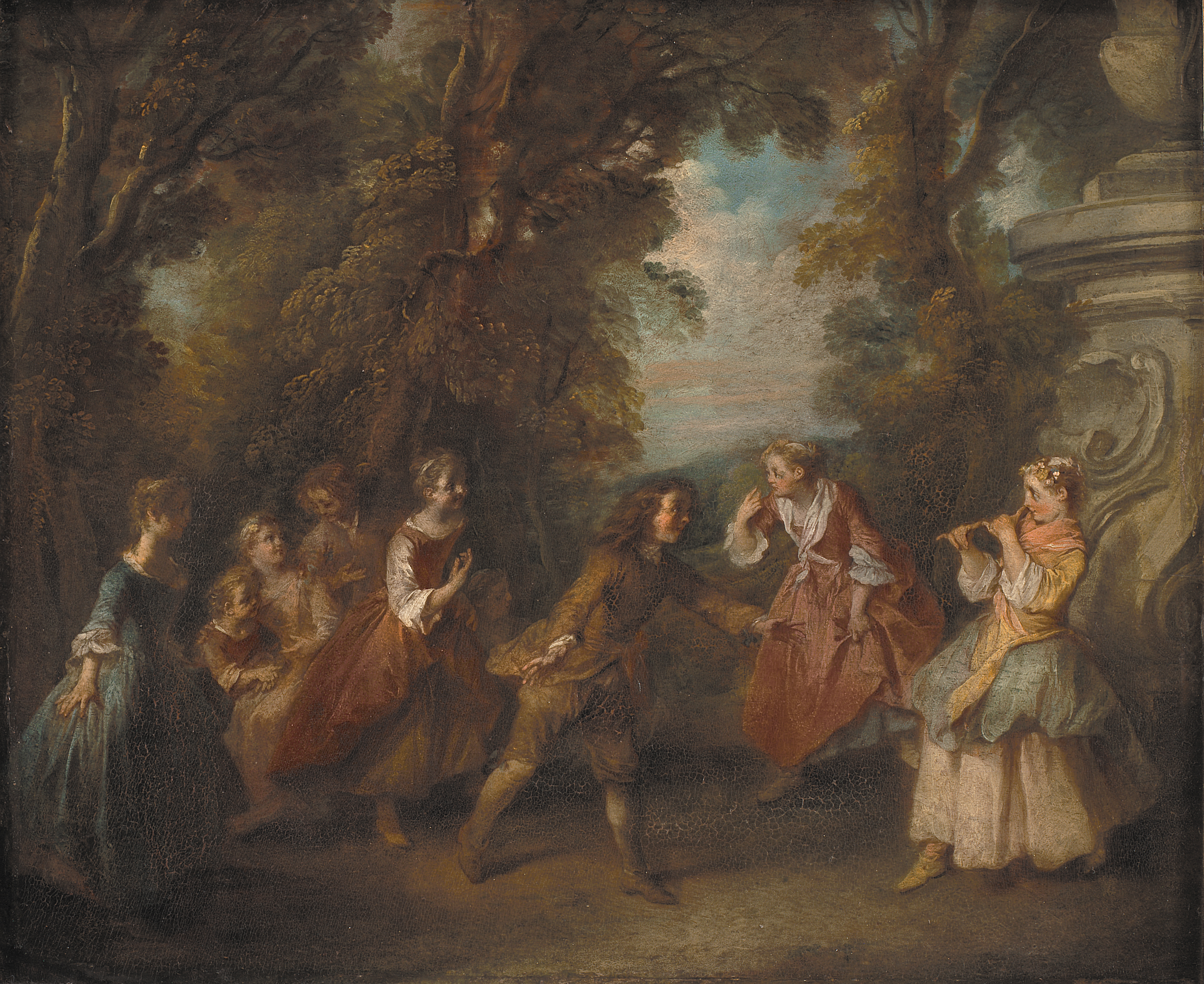
Le jeu des quatre-coins, Statens Museum for Kunst

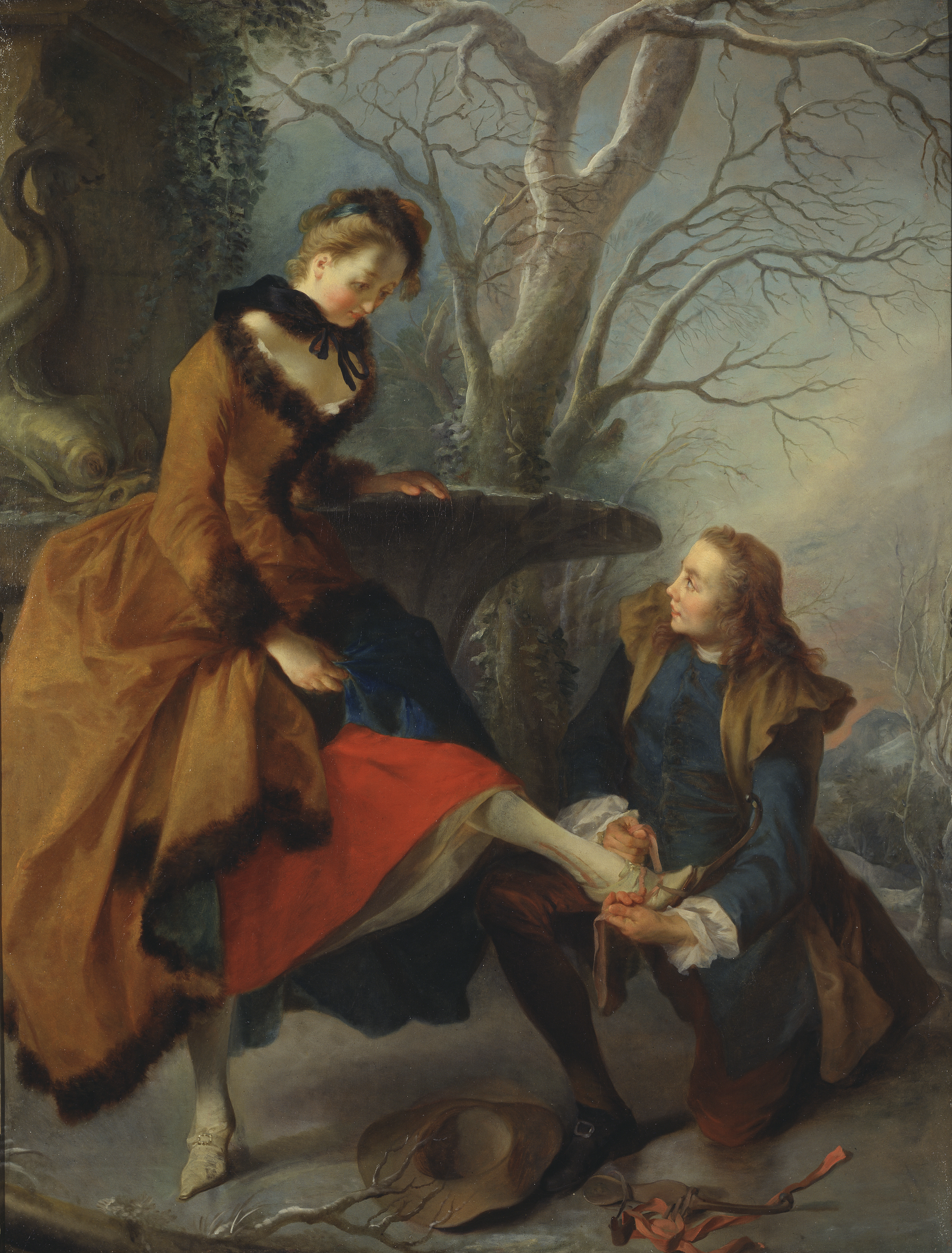
Fastening the Skate, Nationalmuseum, 1743

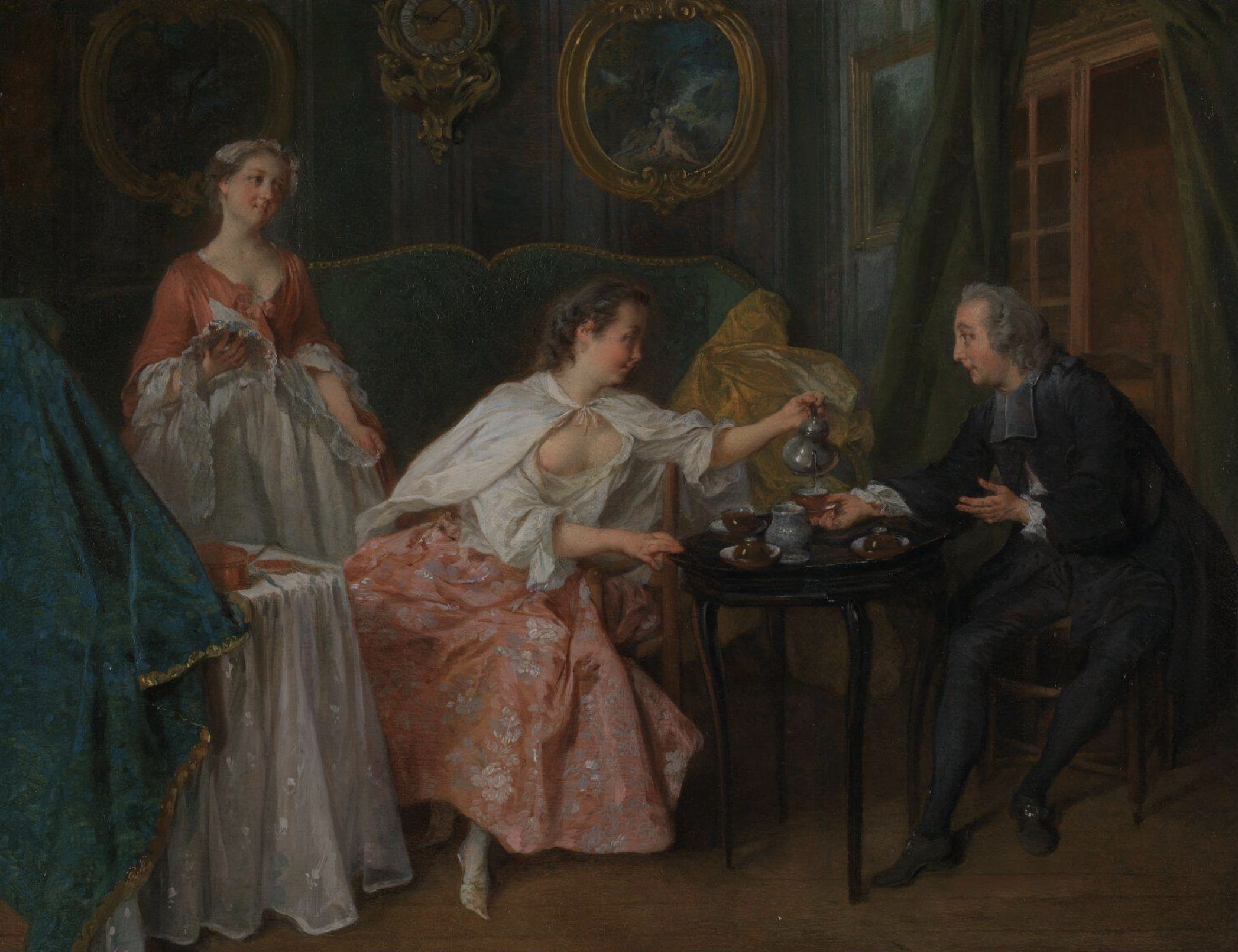
Les Heures du Jour (The Hours of the Day) - le matin National Gallery London

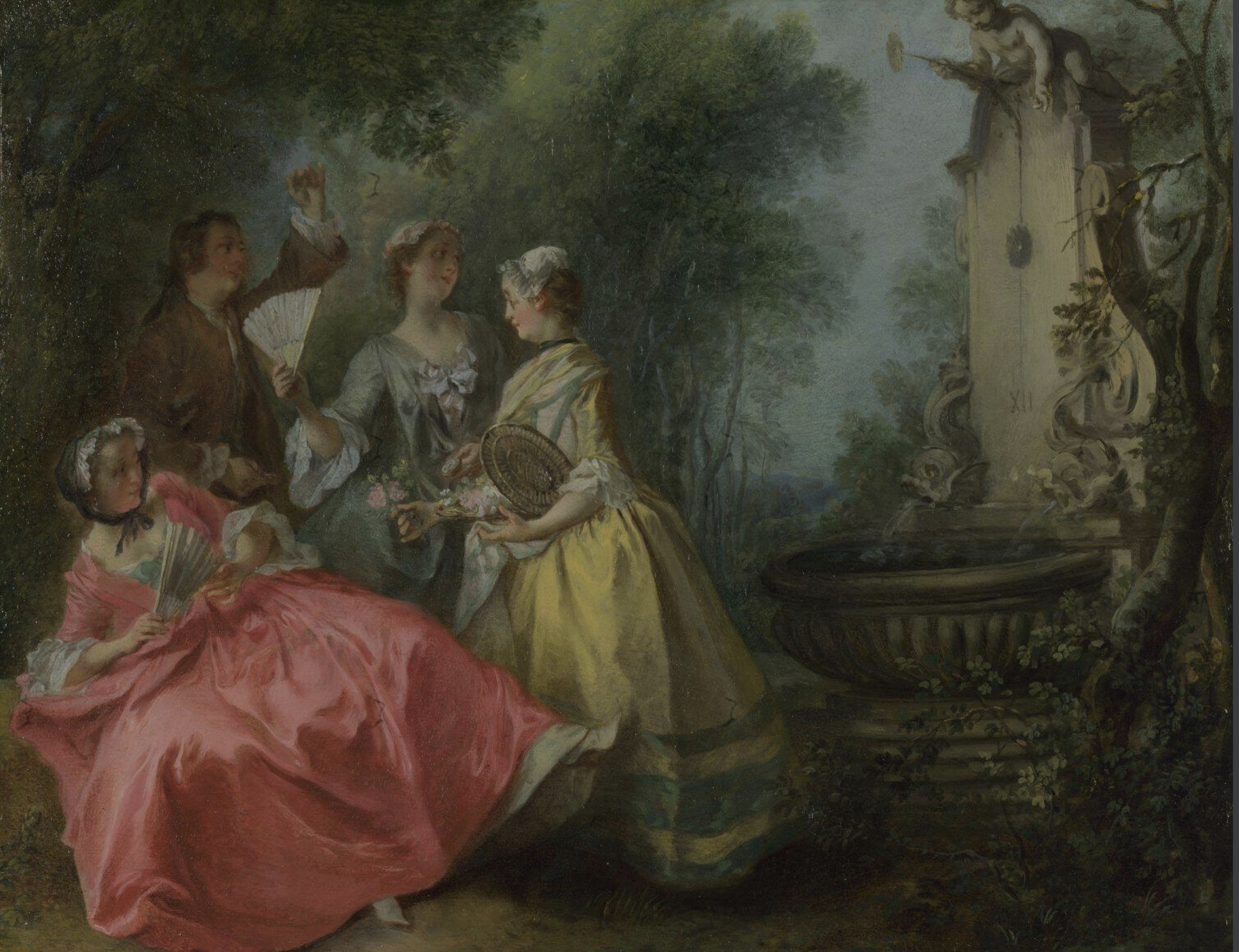
Les Heures du Jour (The Hours of the Day) - le midi, 1741 National Gallery London

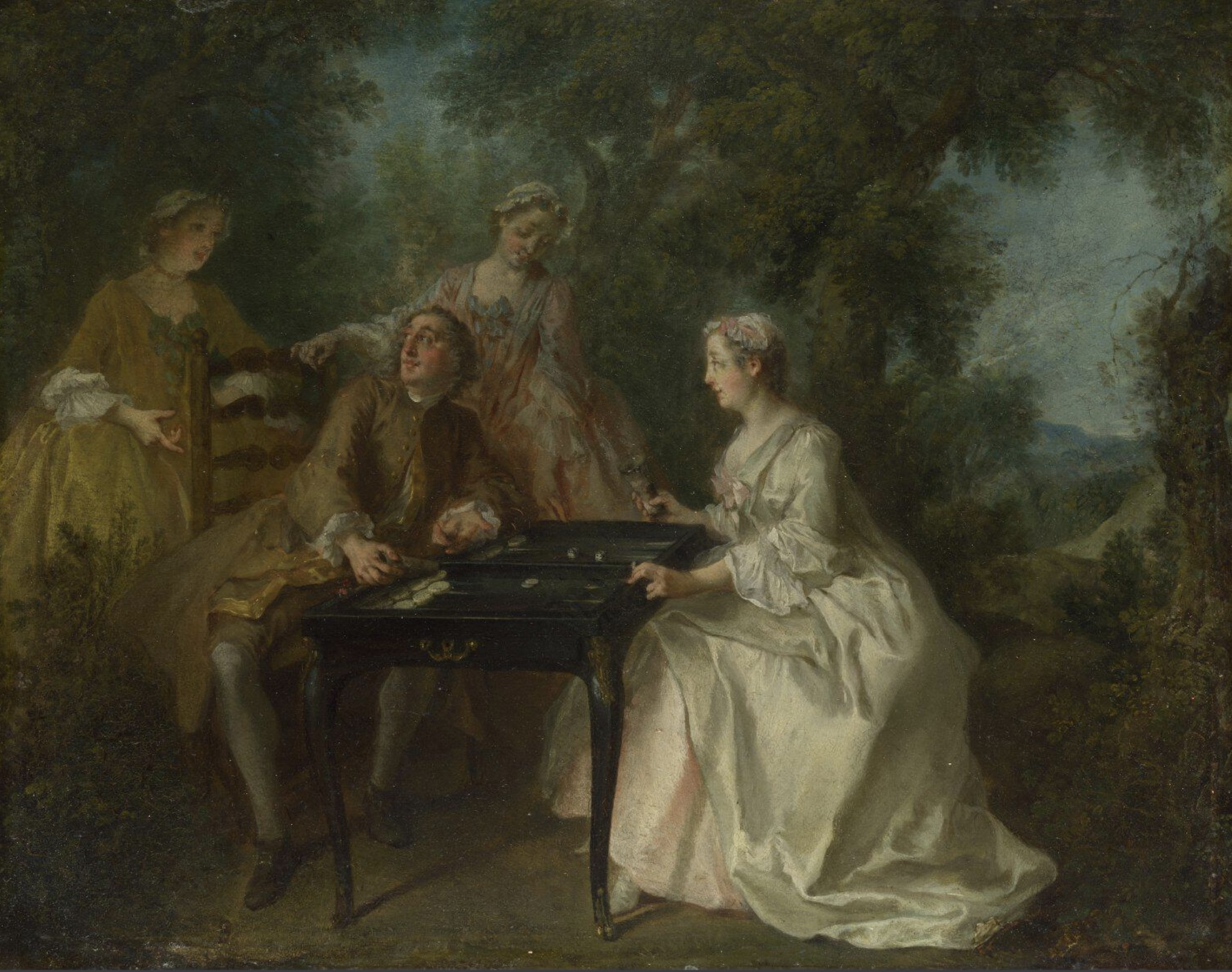
Les Heures du Jour (The Hours of the Day) - l'apres-dinee, 1741 National Gallery London

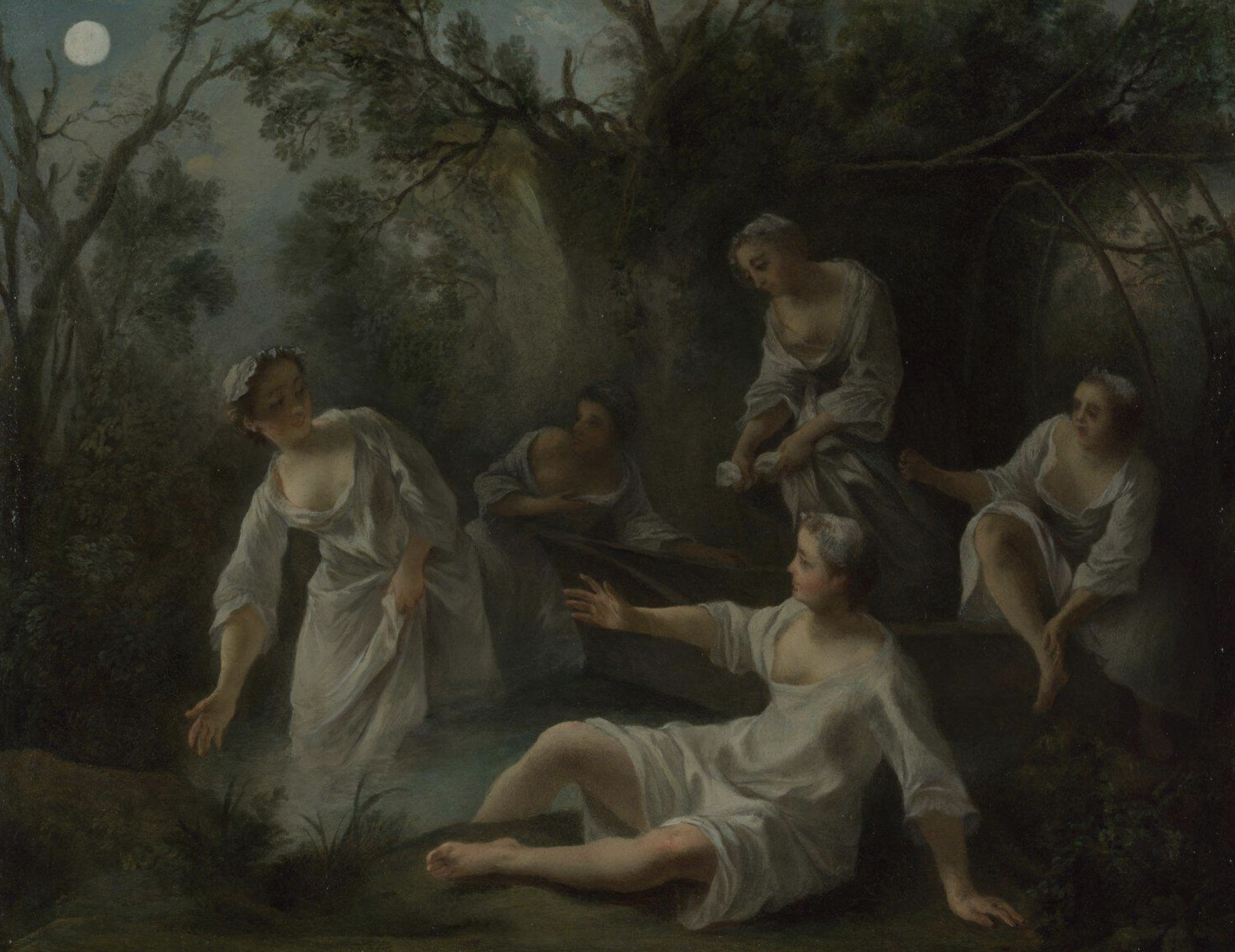
Les Heures du Jour (The Hours of the Day) - la soiree, 1741 National Gallery London
