= Schrevelius =

Schrevelius is a Latinized Dutch name that means scrivener.

The following writers were called Schrevelius:

- Theodorus Schrevelius, 1572–1649, humanist and rector of the Stedelijk Gymnasium Haarlem and the Latin school in Leiden
- His son Cornelis Schrevel, 1608–1661, linguist and rector of the Latin school in Leiden
