= Portuguese galleon São Martinho =

Portuguese galleon

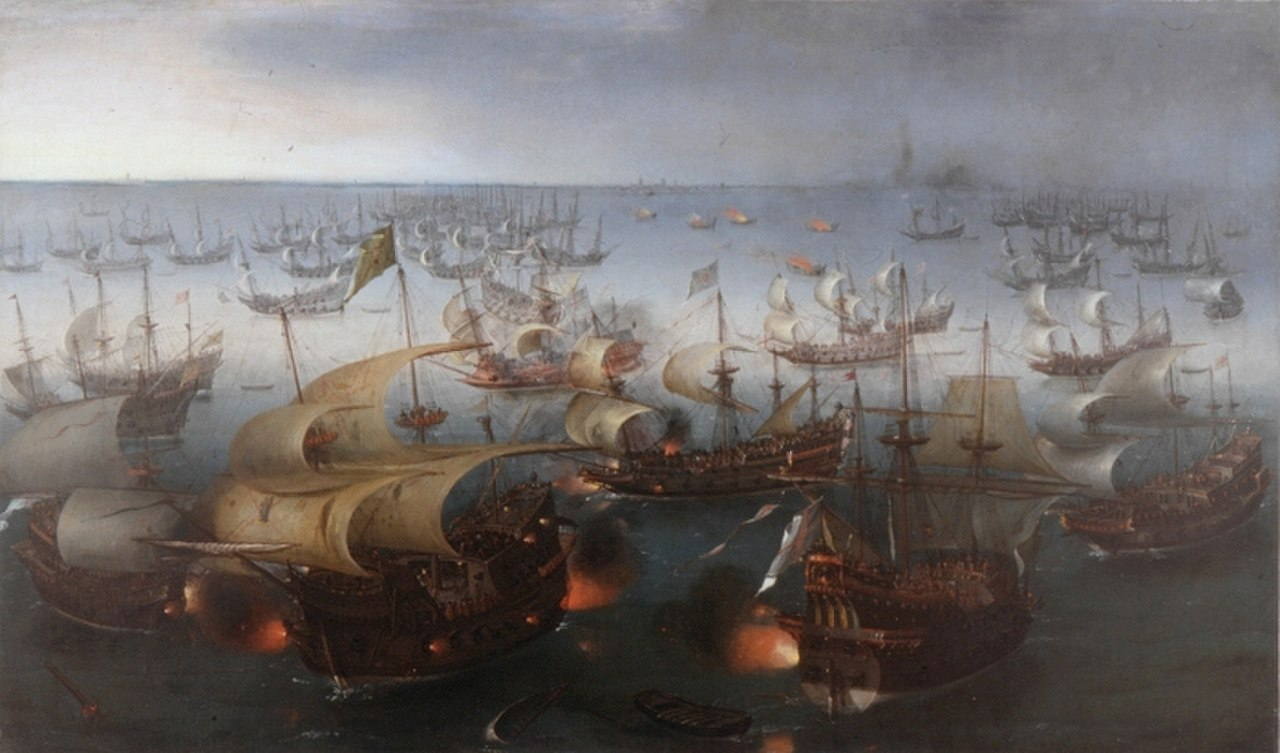
- São Martinho in combat with English ships, in a painting by Hendrik Cornelisz Vroom

History
- Namesake: Saint Martin

General characteristics
- Type: Galleon
- Length: 180 ft (55 m) (approx)
- Beam: 40 ft (12 m) (approx)
- Armament: 48 heavy guns

São Martinho or San Martín (meaning Saint Martin), built as a Portuguese Navy galleon, became the flagship of the Duke of Medina Sedonia, the commander-in-chief of the Spanish Armada.

When the Kingdom of Portugal came under the rule of King Philip II of Spain (Philip I of Portugal), in 1580, the Portuguese had just finished building a large galleon named São Martinho. She was known by Castilians as San Martín. At the time of forming the Spanish Armada, São Martinho was found to be the best of the fleet and was chosen as the flagship of the Armada commander-in-chief, Duke of Medina Sidonia.

São Martinho had an overall length of about 180 feet (55 m) with a beam of about 40 feet (12 m). She carried 48 heavy guns on two enclosed gun decks, plus multiple smaller weapons. According to a painting by Hendrik Cornelisz Vroom, National Maritime Museum, Greenwich, São Martinho had three masts, two square-rigged masts and a lateen mizzen-mast. She was shown with a stern gallery and with the long beakhead characteristic of a galleon. The foremast was set forward of the forecastle.

São Martinho and her crew played a crucial role in defending the armada throughout the English Channel. An example was the fighting of 31 July to 2 August 1588, from the English coast to Calais, such as the rescue ordered by Medina Sidonia of the galleon São João, commanded by Juan Martinez de Recalde, that after repairs and trying to join the formation, was intercepted and faced alone 12 English galleons and race galleons. In the process, São Martinho fought, virtually isolated, for one hour, 15 English galleons. Howard, however, opted to keep some distance, preventing further approach and giving up the fight in duels of gunfire from both sides.

São Martinho had suffered already heavy damage in the battle of Gravelines in July 1588 when a group of English ships led by Sir Francis Drake in Revenge bore down upon her. With the assistance of the galleon São Mateus she escaped the attack and led the Armada back to Spain through a ferocious storm, where she had to be towed into port at Santander. Because of a storm, São Martinho had to take refuge at Laredo, where Medina Sidonia found the galleass Napolitana and other ships in harbor. The ship was full of sick crew and was itself in sad condition.
