= Nicolaes de Kemp =

Dutch Golden Age painter

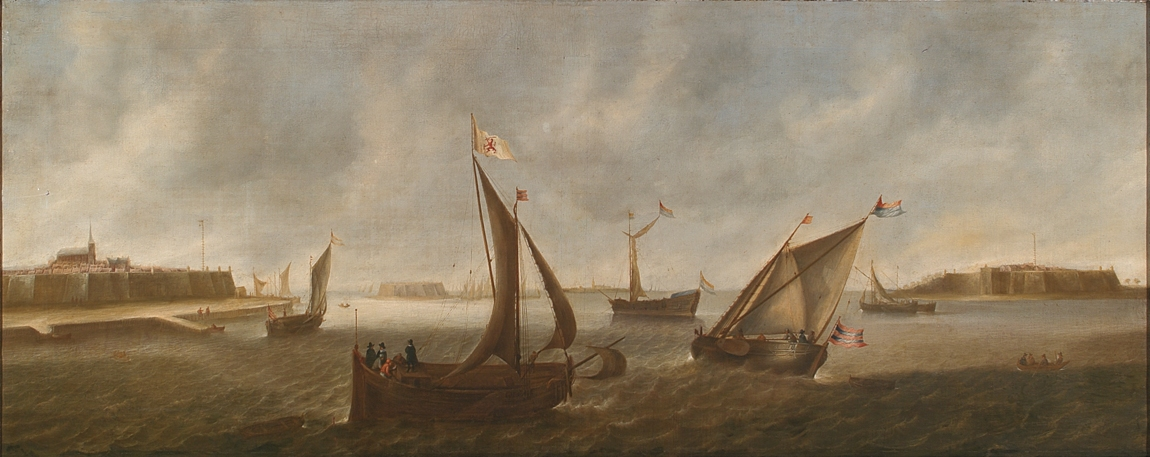
View of a walled city with ships at sail

Nicolaes de Kemp (1574 – 1647), was a Dutch Golden Age painter.

== Biography ==
Nicolaes de Kemp was born in Haarlem and became the pupil of Hendrik Cornelisz Vroom. He is known for marines. He died in Haarlem.
