= Hendrick Cornelisz Vroom =

Dutch painter (c.1562–1640)

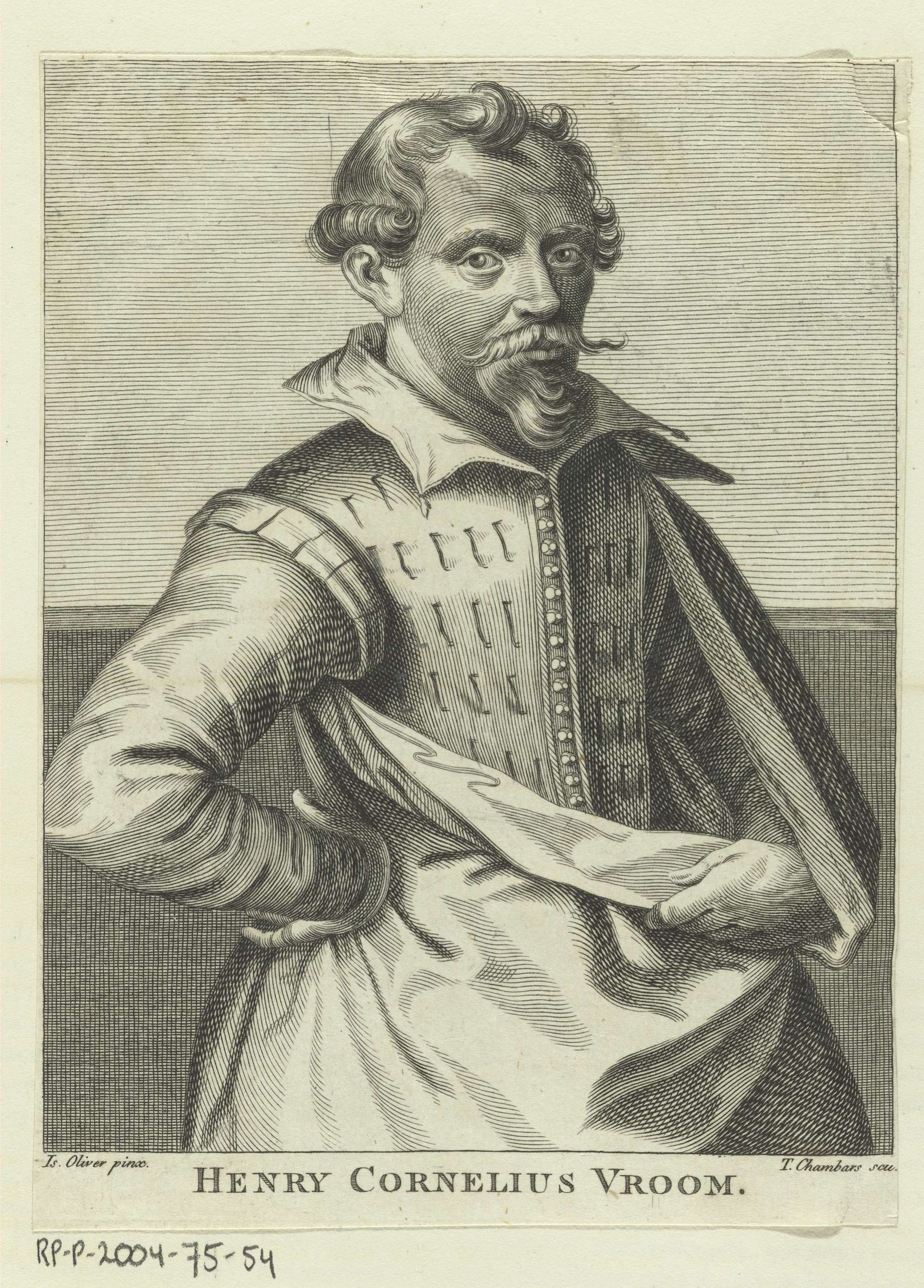
- Engraving of the artist, c. 1762.
- Born: c. 1562; Haarlem, County of Holland
- Died: c. 1640; Haarlem, United Provinces of the Netherlands
- Occupation: Painter
- Era: Dutch Golden Age

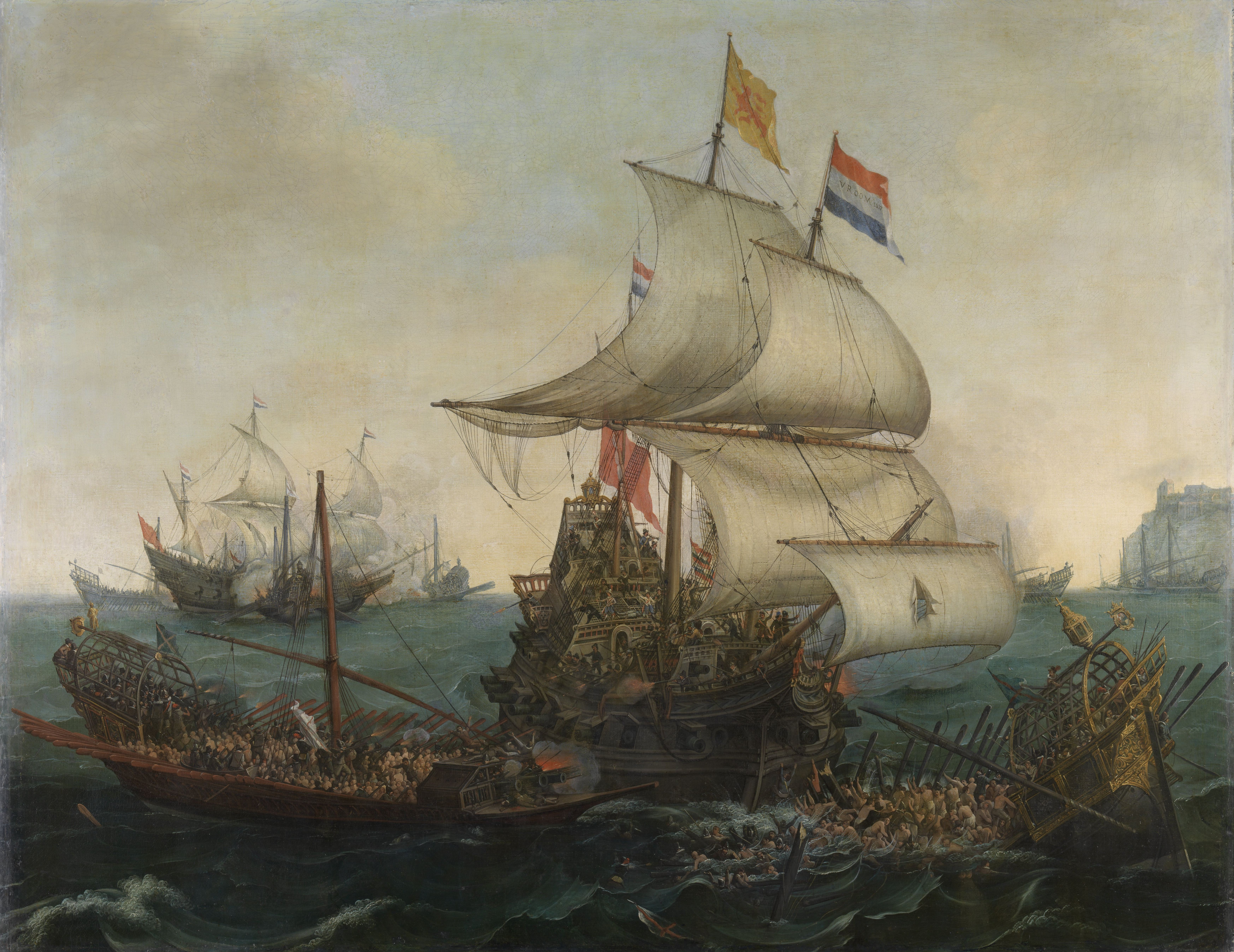
Dutch Ships Ramming Spanish Galleys off the Flemish Coast in October 1602, 1617

Hendrik Cornelisz Vroom (c.1562 – February 4, 1640 (buried)) was a Dutch Golden Age painter credited with being the founder of Dutch marine art or seascape painting. Beginning with the "birds-eye" viewpoint of earlier Netherlandish marine art, his later works show a view from lower down, and more realistic depiction of the seas themselves. He is not to be confused with his son and pupil Cornelis Vroom.

== Biography ==
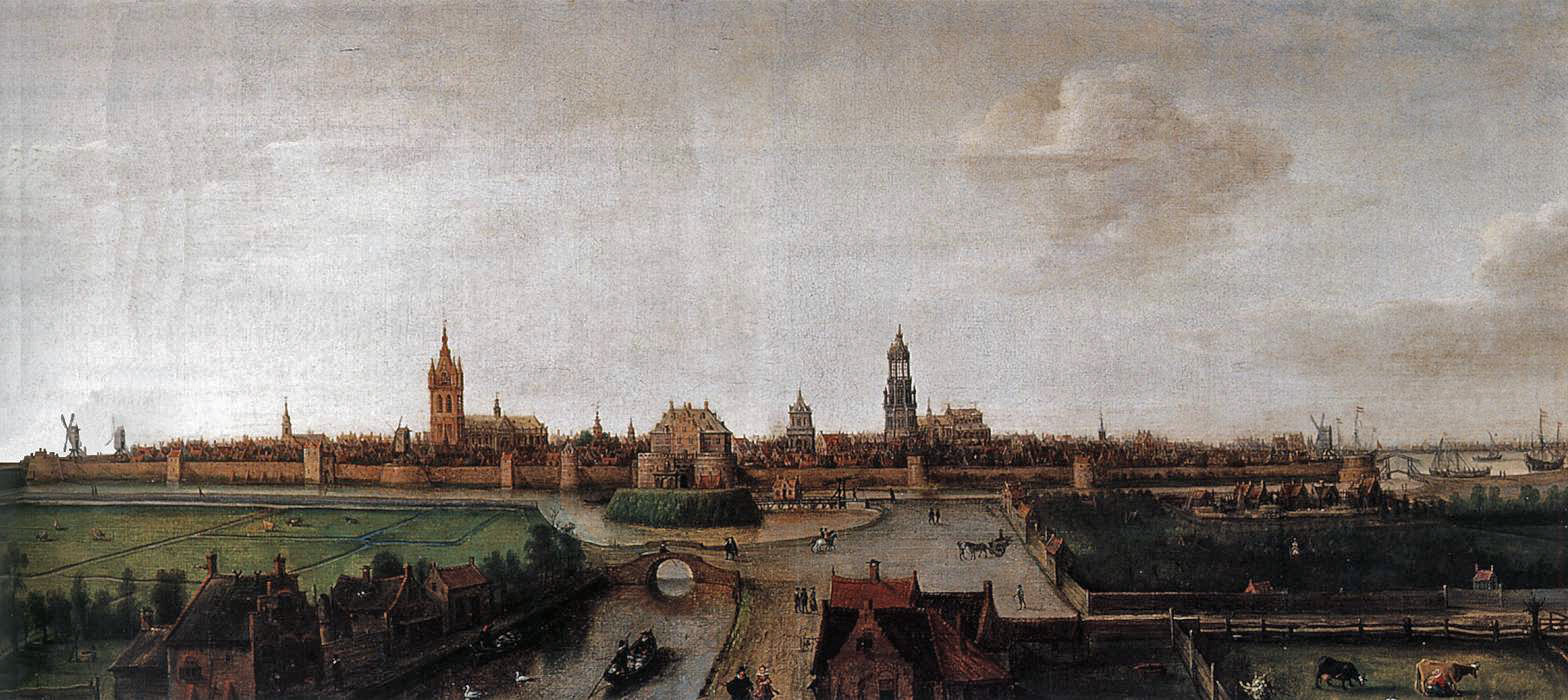
View of Delft seen from the west; circa 1615: one of the earliest cityscapes in the Netherlands, and the earliest of Delft

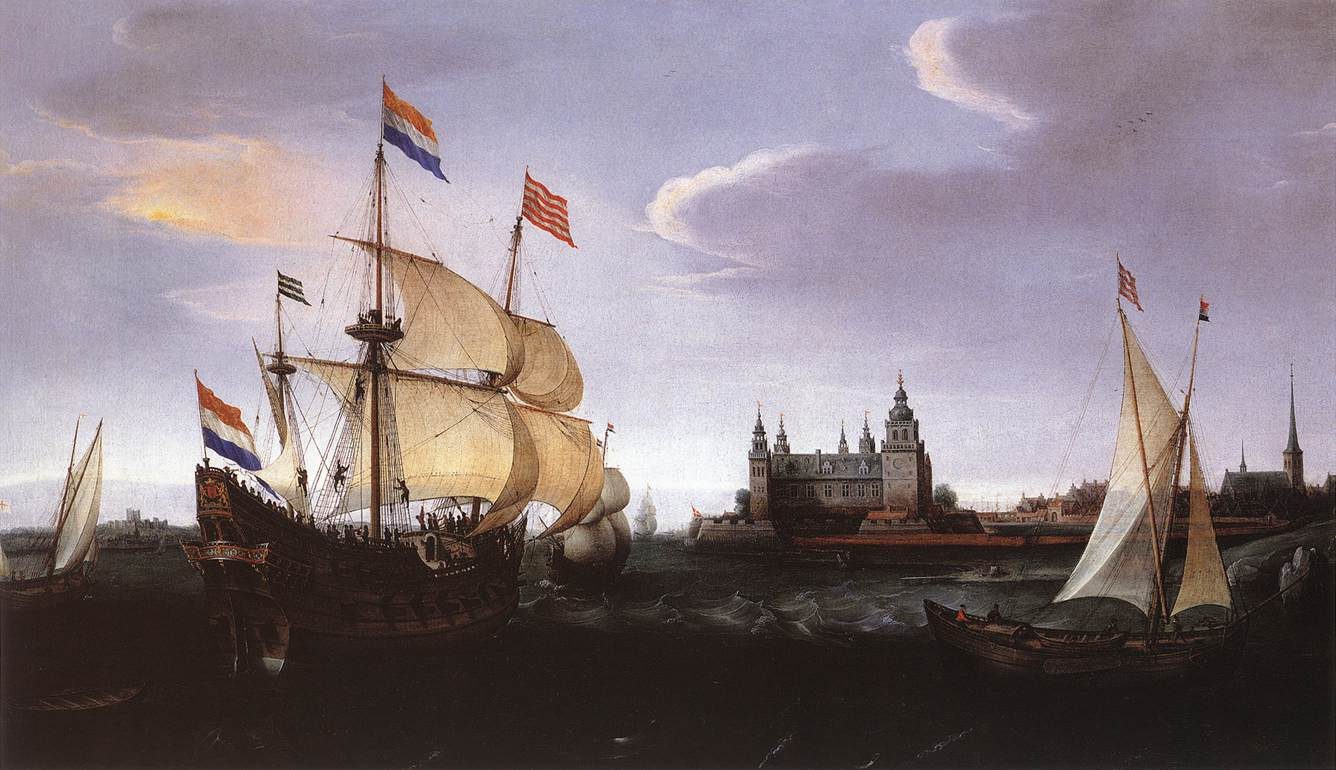
Arrival of a Dutch Three master at Kronborg Castle, Helsingør

Vroom was born in Haarlem. Much of what is known of his life comes from his biography by Karel van Mander, who devoted four pages to him in his "Schilder-boeck", which reads as an adventure story, complete with freezing his pants to a mountain top and nearly starving to death on a rock with a group that discussed cannibalism as a possible survival strategy.

Though it is unknown at what age he started on his travels, Vroom was born into a family of artists and began his career as a pottery (faience) painter and when his mother remarried, was no older than 19 when he rebelled against his stepfather who insisted he stick to pottery painting, by boarding a ship for Spain (Sevilla) and from thence via Livorno and Florence to Rome.

In Florence he was patronized around 1585–87 by Cardinal Ferdinando de' Medici, later Grand Duke of Tuscany. While there he became a pupil of Paulus Bril. He went back and forth to Venice, where he earned money as a majolica painter.

When he returned north, he travelled via Milan, Genoa, Albisola (a ceramics center where he again earned money painting ceramics), Turin (where he met the Haarlem painter Jan Kraeck), and Lyon (via a mountain pass where his pants froze to the summit rock). From there he travelled to Paris, where he met a painter from Leiden, and from there he went to Rouen, where he became mortally ill but was saved by a woman who bandaged his head.

There he boarded a ship homewards and was back in Haarlem in 1590, the year he married, before travelling to Danzig (now Gdańsk) to visit his uncle, Frederick Henricksz, who was city architect there, and where he painted an altarpiece.

During his next journey, this time to Portugal, he survived shipwreck, but was threatened with execution as "an English pirate" - from which he was saved by being recognized as a Catholic from his salvaged devotional paintings, which convinced the monks on the beach that he and his companions were not "heathen Protestants" (Vroom, having been to Italy, had coached his fellow survivors in the catechism). Having been granted free passage, Vroom travelled to St. Huves (Setubal), where he recorded his adventures in a painting that he sold to a painter there.

When he decided to return to Haarlem, he got off the ship at the last minute due to a premonition, being called a "crazy painter". The ship sank in the Øresund near Helsingor and in Haarlem Vroom was reported dead. However, he had written to his wife, who thus discovered he was still alive. He eventually died in Haarlem, in his late seventies.

== Tapestry designs ==
When he did return to Haarlem, it was as an artist of international repute and soon afterwards he received two commissions for tapestry designs, one of which, from Lord Howard of Effingham, was for a series of ten tapestries depicting the defeat of the Spanish Armada of 1588, by the English under Howard’s overall command as Lord Admiral. Executed in Brussels in 1592–95, the tapestries later decorated the House of Lords, Westminster, and were fortunately recorded in engravings before they were destroyed by fire in 1834.

== Legacy ==
Vroom recorded important engagements of the Dutch and English fleets in his oil paintings, giving a detailed portrayal of ships. Most of the pieces described by Van Mander are lost, and his greatest commissions were obtained after Van Mander's death. Vroom's large and decorative battles, ceremonial scenes and beach views introduced novel compositional devices to be taken up by younger Dutch marinists. The Haarlem marine painters Hans Goderis, Cornelis Verbeeck and Cornelis Claesz van Wieringen were all directly influenced by him. He became a member of the Haarlem Guild of St. Luke and his pupils included Aert Anthonisz, Nicolaes de Kemp, Jan Porcellis, and his sons Cornelis Hendriksz Vroom and Frederik Hendricksz Vroom.

== Works ==
Among his more famous historical scenes included the 1607 Battle of Gibraltar and the arrival of various dignitaries in Amsterdam, including Protestant leader Frederick V, Elector Palatine of Bohemia who had been exiled by the Holy Roman Emperor.

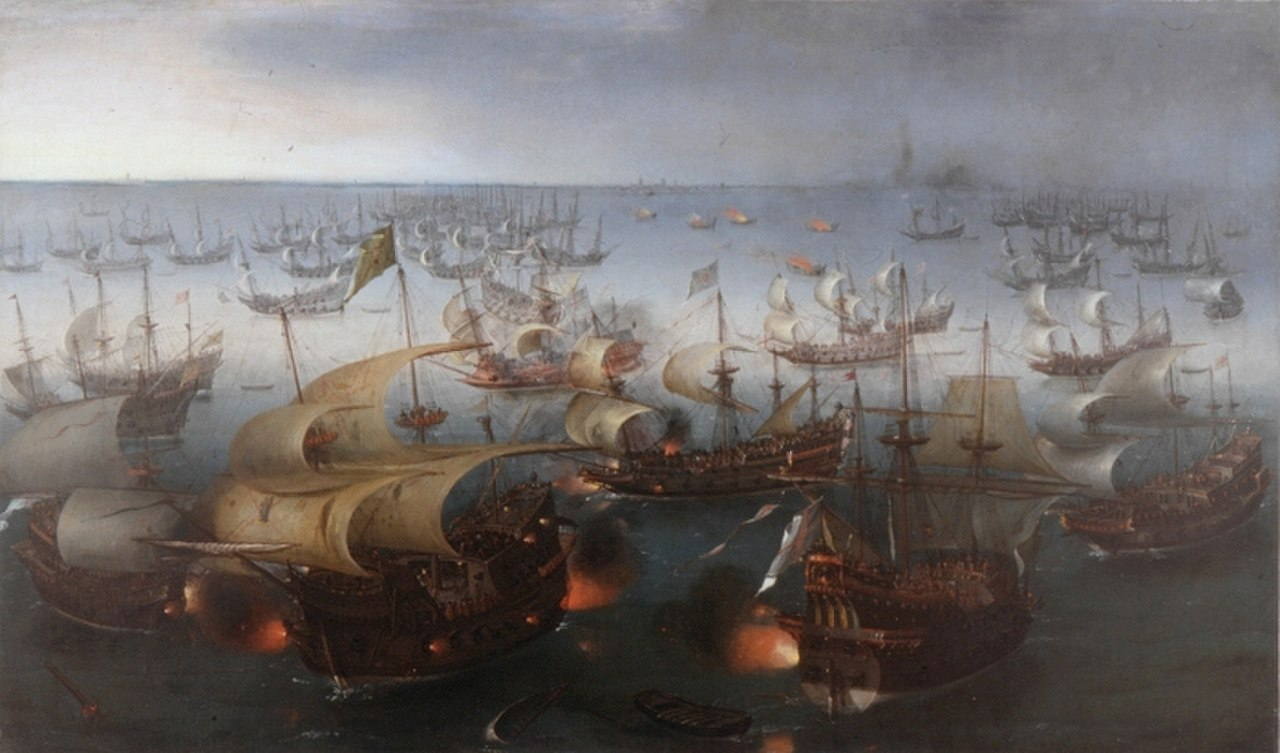
The Battle with the Spanish Armada, painted 1601, oil on canvas.

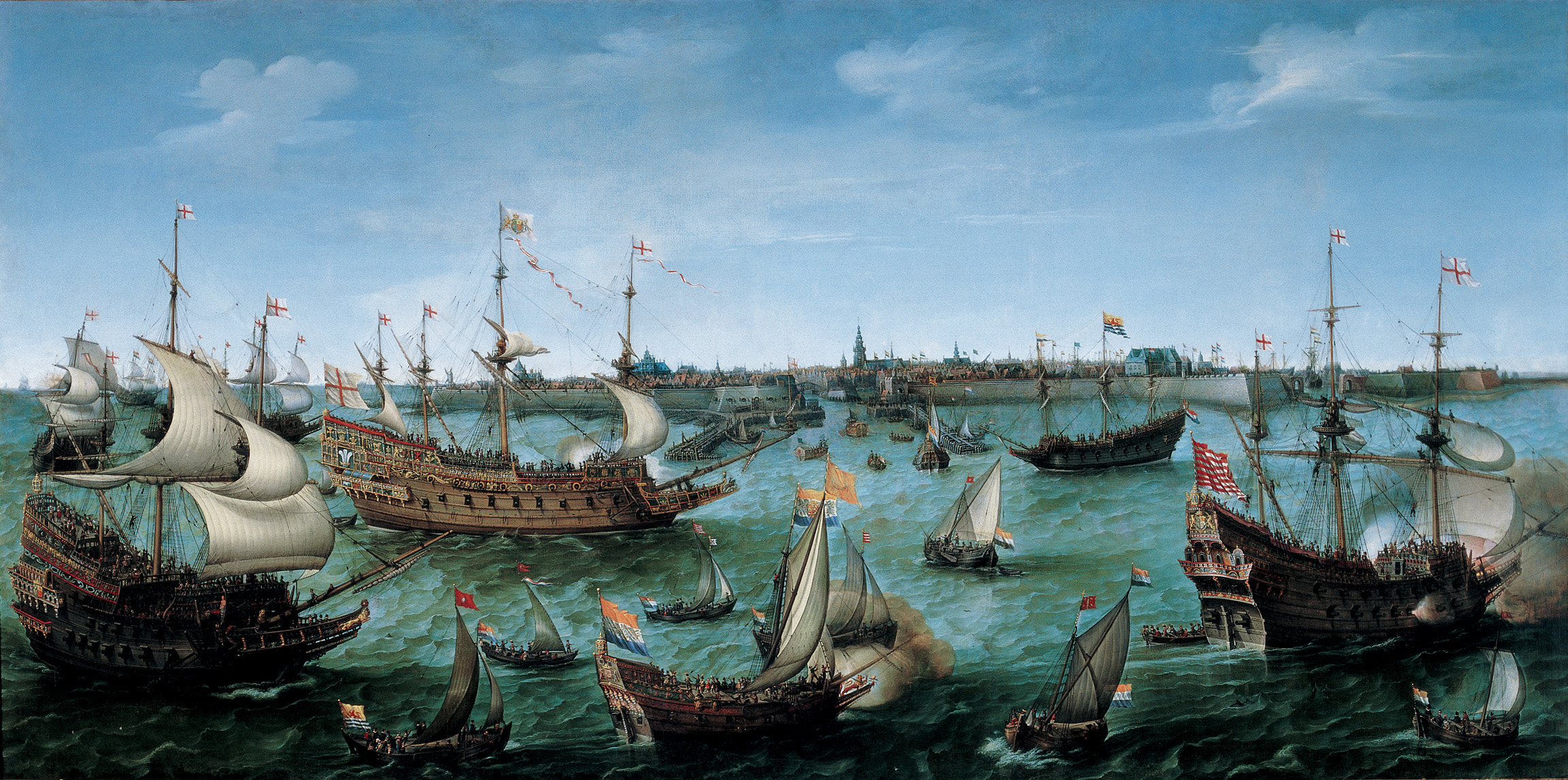
The Arrival at Vlissingen of Frederick V, Elector Palatine, oil on canvas.

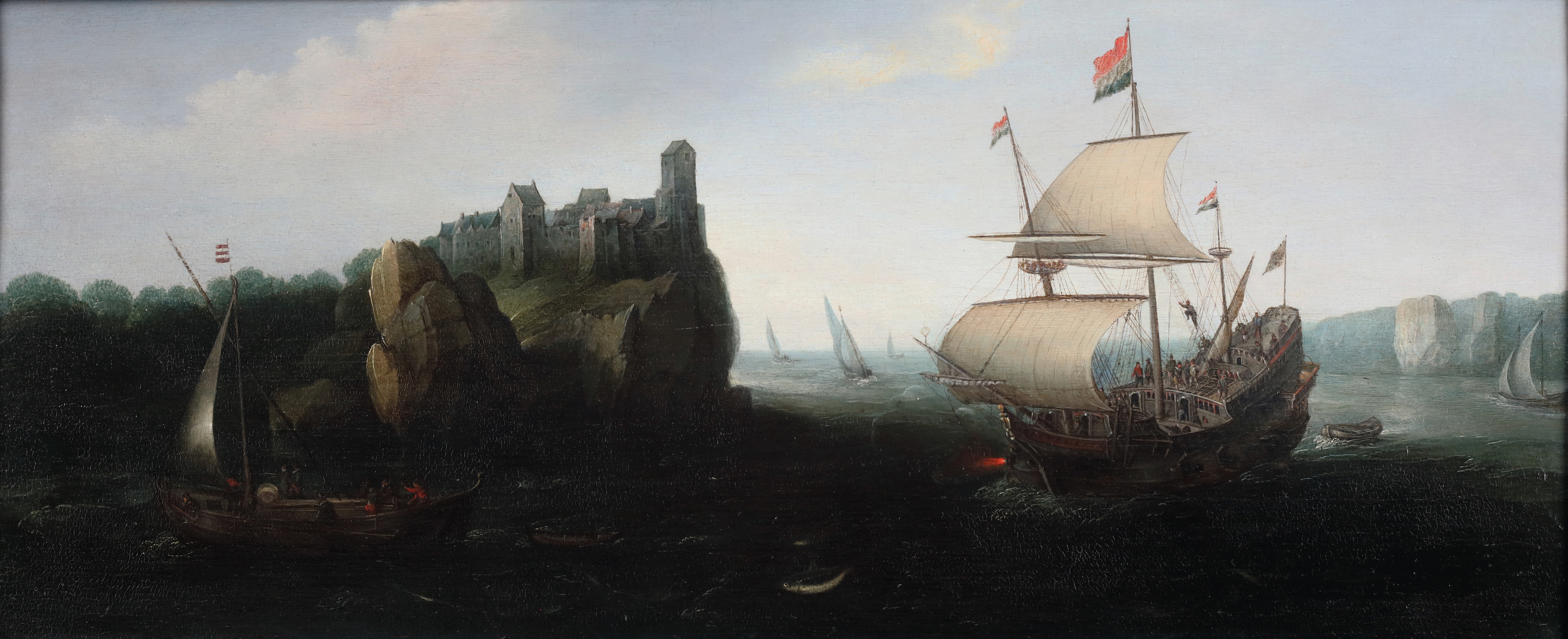
A Dutch fregat in choppy water

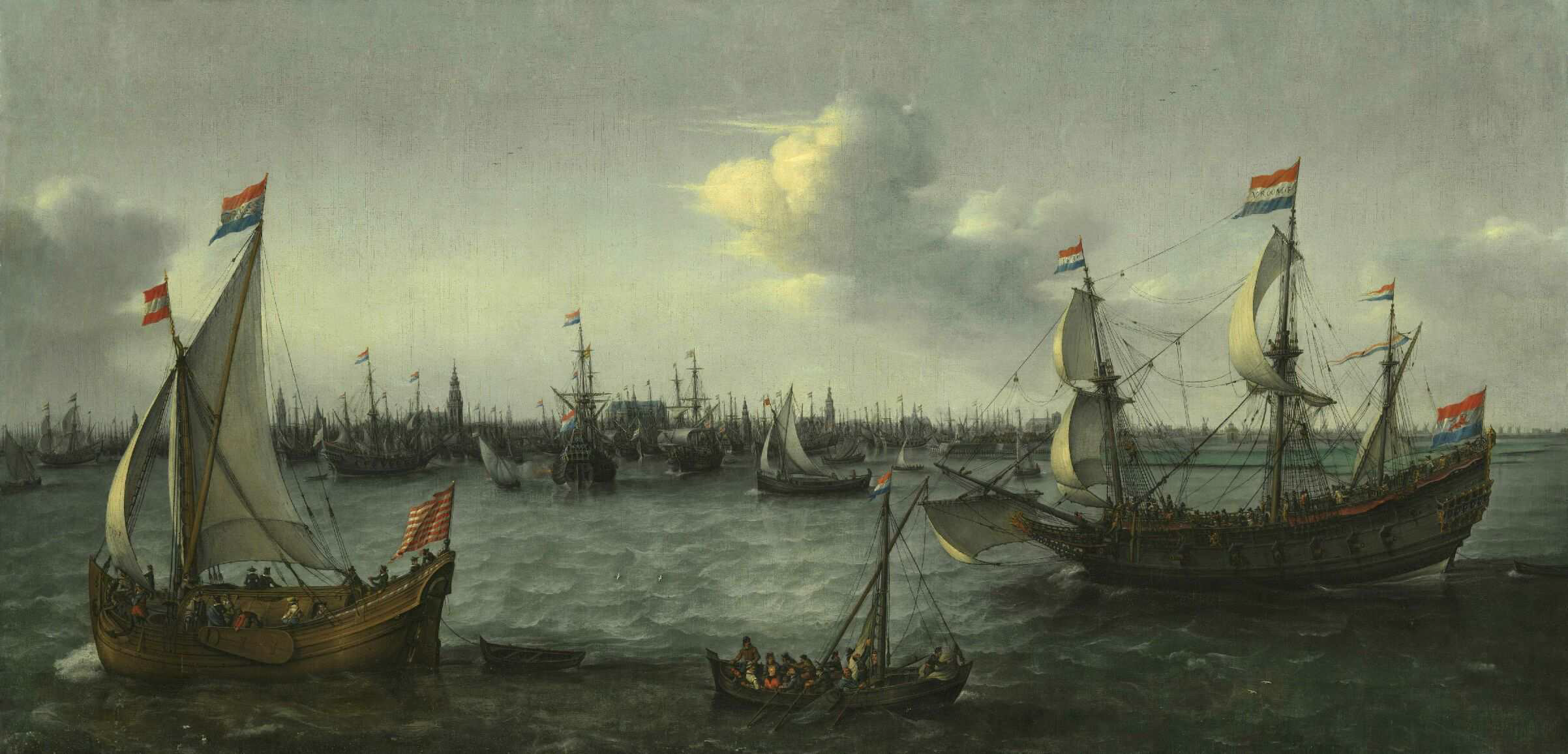
The Harbour in Amsterdam (1630) showing the Port of Amsterdam

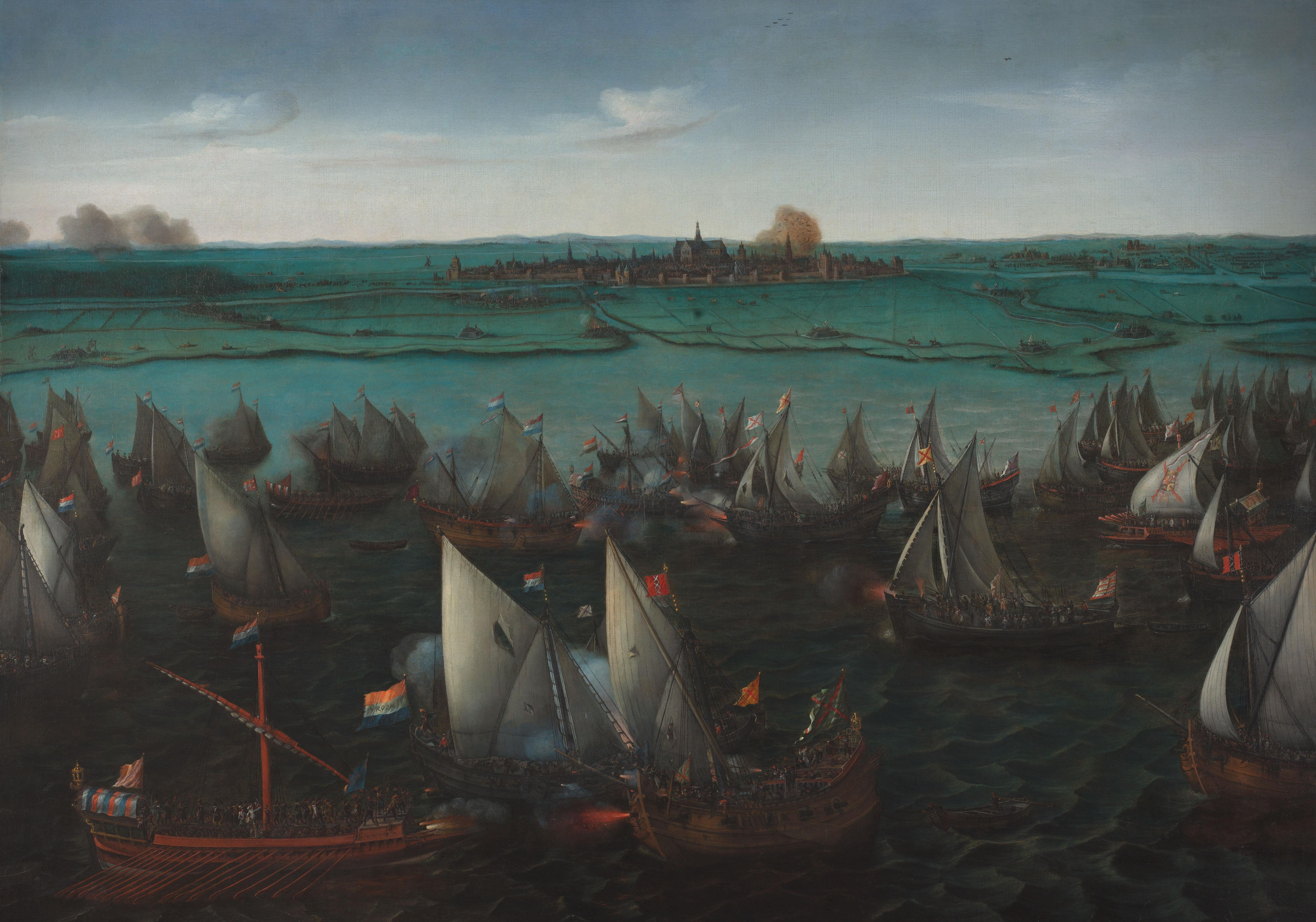
"Battle in 1573 between Dutch and Spanish ships on the Haarlemmermeer" (Rijksmuseum, Amsterdam)
