= Jan Pietersz Zomer =

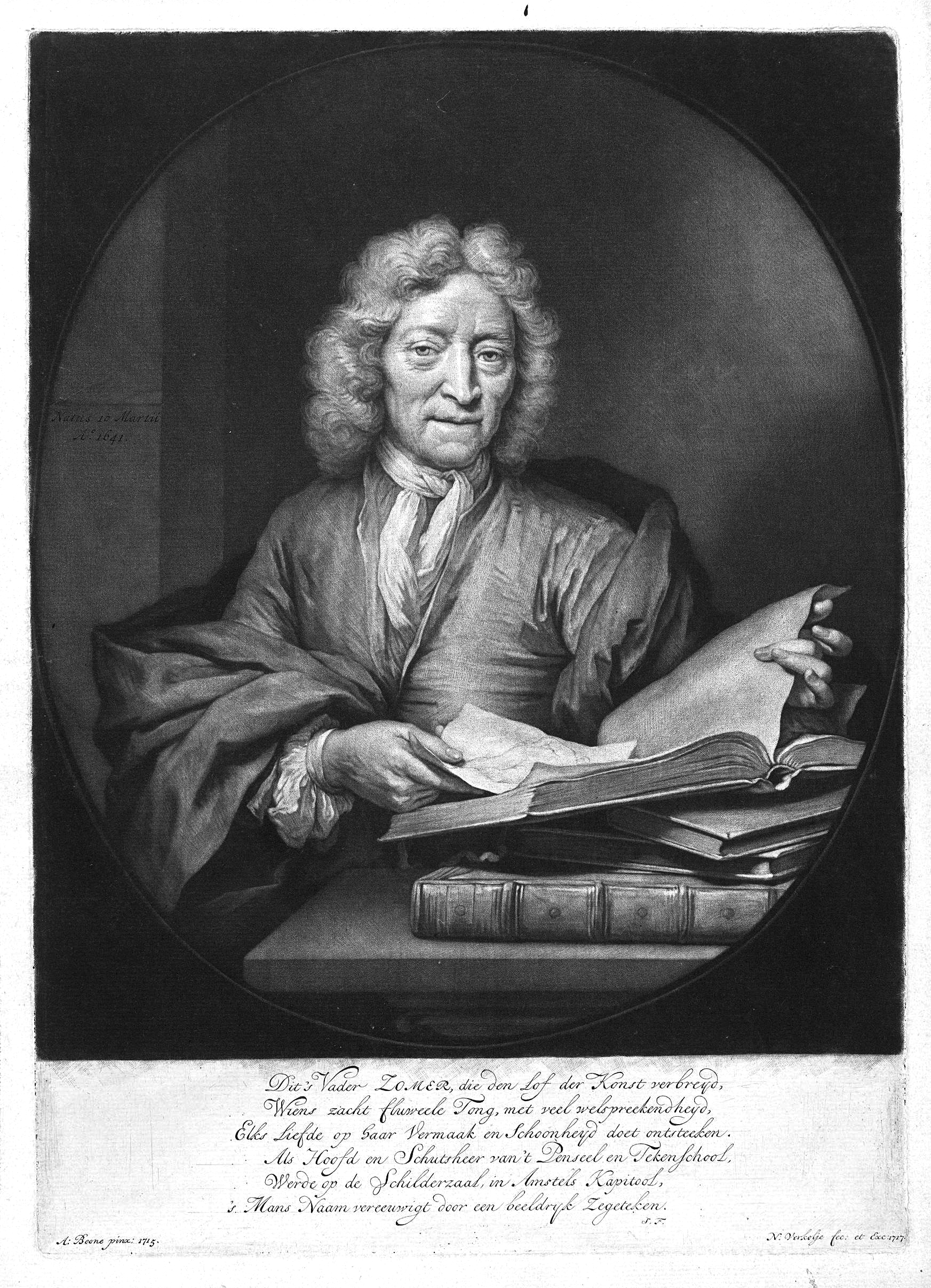
Jan Pietersz. Zomer (1641–1726) (Nicolaas Verkolje, 1717)

Jan Pietersz van Zomer (1641–1724) was a Dutch Golden Age engraver and art collector.

== Biography ==
Van Zomer was born and died in Amsterdam. According to Houbraken he was a pupil of Pieter Jansz and he meant to write his biography but never got that far as he died before Volume 3 was published. Zomer knew several artists first hand, because he was an art dealer who did business with them. He knew Mathias Withoos at the end of his life, who suffered from arthritis so badly that his fingers were curled like eagle claws, which prevented him from working for 2–3 months at a time. Houbraken mentioned him again in the biography of Willem Kalf, because Kalf had attended an auction of paintings at the Heeren Logement and then visited Zomer at his house, and on his way home he fell on his chest, and later went to bed feeling poorly but was dead in the morning. Houbraken mentioned him again in his biography of Nicolaes Berchem, saying that Berchem enjoyed collecting prints and once spent 60 guilders on a print by Raphael.

According to the RKD he was a pupil of Pieter Jansz and is known for glass engraving, portraits and figure studies, and engravings.
