= Pieter Jansz (1612–1672) =

Dutch Golden Age painter

Pieter Jansz (c. 1612 Amsterdam – 1672, Amsterdam), was a Dutch Golden Age painter.

== Biography ==
According to Houbraken, he was a good draughtsman who learned to paint from the Haarlem glass painter Jan Philipsz van Bouckhorst, whose works can still be seen in many Dutch churches. Both he and his teacher died in the rampjaar 1672. Jansz's own pupil was Jan Pietersz Zomer.

According to the RKD he painted, sculpted and made designs for book illustrations.
