= Roeland van Laer =

Dutch painter

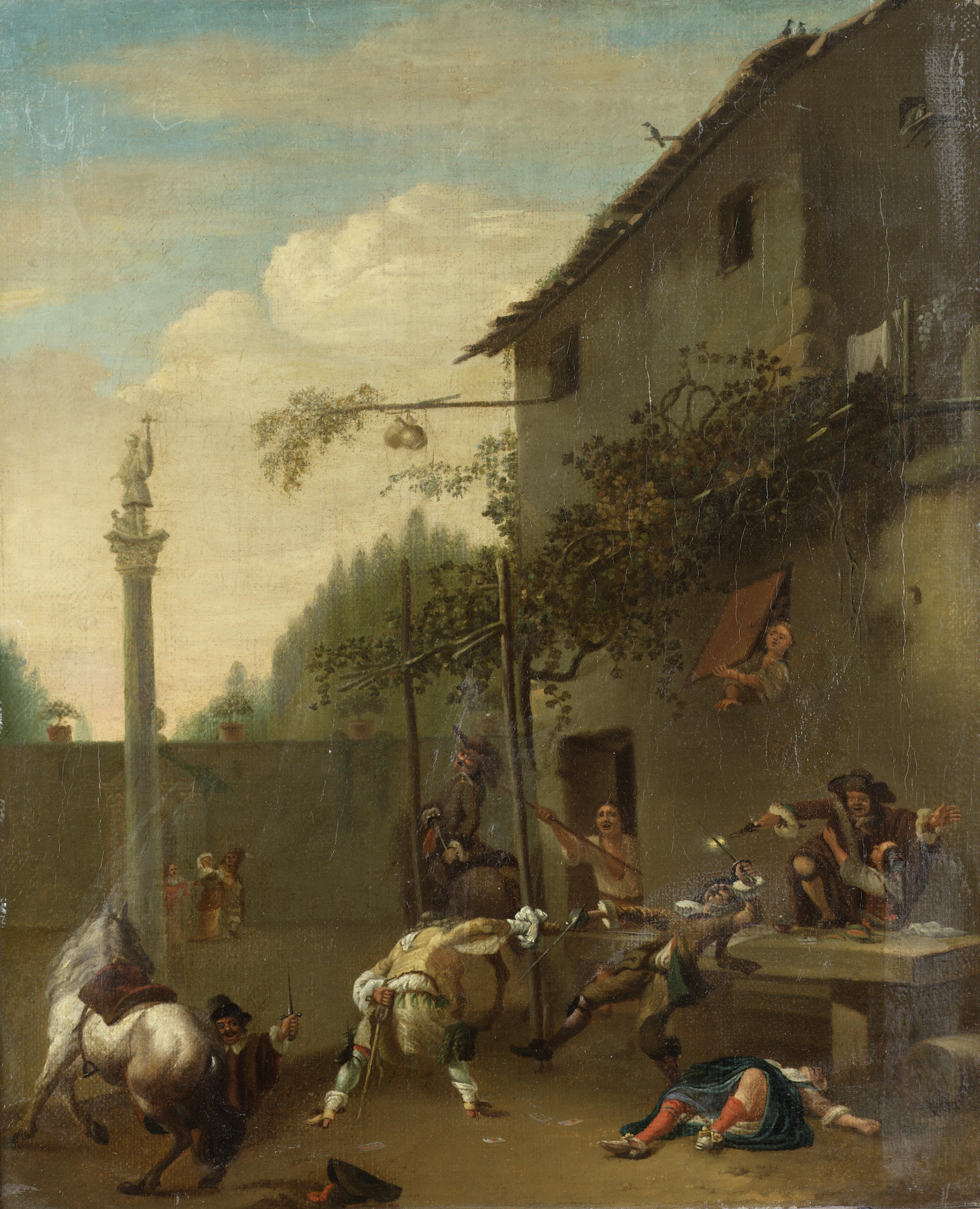
Soldiers fighting outside an inn

Roeland van Laer (1598 – after 1635), was a Dutch Golden Age landscape painter.

== Biography ==
Roeland van Laer was born in Haarlem. According to Houbraken who quoted the Haarlem writer Theodorus Schrevelius, Roeland and his brother Pieter travelled together to Italy, and Roeland died in Genua. Pieter returned home alone to Haarlem after his brother died. In his biographical sketch about his brother Pieter, Houbraken quoted Joachim von Sandrart who said that Laer had a younger brother who had travelled with him and took to painting cliffs and river valleys, and this brother died with his mule when they were crossing a bridge over a ravine one day and it collapsed.

According to the RKD, he was the brother of Pieter and Nicolaes. He travelled to Rome in 1626-1629 and was in Genoa during the years 1635-1640, and is known for landscapes.
