= Theodorus Schrevelius =

Dutch Golden Age writer and poet (1572–1649)

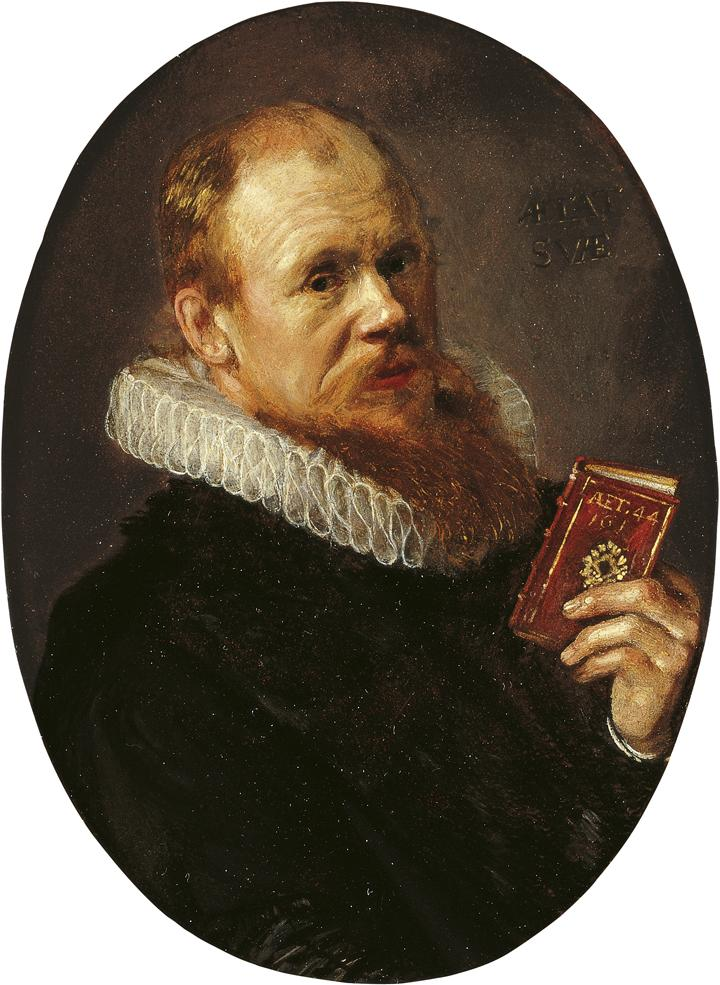
Theodorus Schrevelius, by Frans Hals.

Theodorus Schrevelius (25 July 1572 – 2 December 1649) was a Dutch Golden Age writer and poet.

== Biography ==
He was born in Haarlem, and in 1591 went to study Greek and Latin at the University of Leiden. He became the assistant director of the Latin school in Haarlem in 1597, where he also started work on translating Ovid. He was friends with the Mannerist artist group led by Karel van Mander, who himself translated Ovid's Metamorphoses in 1604. Schrevelius married Maria van Teylingen (1570–1652) in Alkmaar in 1599 and had seven children, including sons Augustinus Schrevelius, attorney at the Hof van Holland (High Court of Holland and Zeeland) and Cornelius Schrevelius, who later succeeded him as director of the Leiden school.

In 1609, he succeeded Cornelis Schonaeus as director of the Haarlem Latin School, but in 1620 he was dismissed for his Remonstrant ideas. He fled to Leiden with other Haarlem Remonstrant supporters and from 1625 to 1642 he was director of the Latin school in Leiden (where Rembrandt had received his early education from ca. 1615–1620). In 1642, after handing his position over to his son Cornelis, he returned to Haarlem where he devoted himself to writing about Haarlem in his Harlemum (1647) and Harlemias (1648). He died in 1649 and was buried in the St. Bavochurch in the Brewer's chapel.

=== Works ===
- Translation of Ovid's Tristia Tristium (1612)
- Diatribae scholasticae (1626)
- Staten edition of the three books of Homer's Iliad in 1636
- Harlemias, 1648, in Google books

== History of Haarlem ==
He is best known today for his Harlemias, or history of Haarlem, which was first published 20 years after his colleague Samuel Ampzing published his poetic history of Haarlem in verse form called Beschrijvinge ende lof der stad Haerlem in Holland. In this book, Schrevelius includes biographical sketches of many local artists that Arnold Houbraken later used for his Schouburg. The list of painters Houbraken included (Schrevelius listed many more) were Johannes Torrentius, Pieter de Grebber, Frans Pietersz de Grebber, Maria de Grebber, Gerard Sprong, Hendrik Gerritsz Pot, Cornelis Claesz van Wieringen, Cornelis Verbeeck, Hans Goderis, Cornelis Vroom, son of Hendrik Vroom, Joh. Jakobsz. who spent many years in Italy, Nicolas Zuyker, Gerrit Claesz Bleker, Salomon van Ruysdael, Reyer van Blommendael, Floris van Dyck, Willem Heda, Roeland van Laer, Pieter van Laer, Pieter Holsteyn, and Jan Philipsz van Bouckhorst.

== Trivia ==
In his Harlemias, Schrevelius claimed that the art of printing, itself the keeper of all science, was invented in Haarlem in 1440 by Laurens Janszoon Coster. The street Schreveliusstraat in Haarlem is named after him.
