= Hogere Burger School (Haarlem) =

Hoogere Burger School
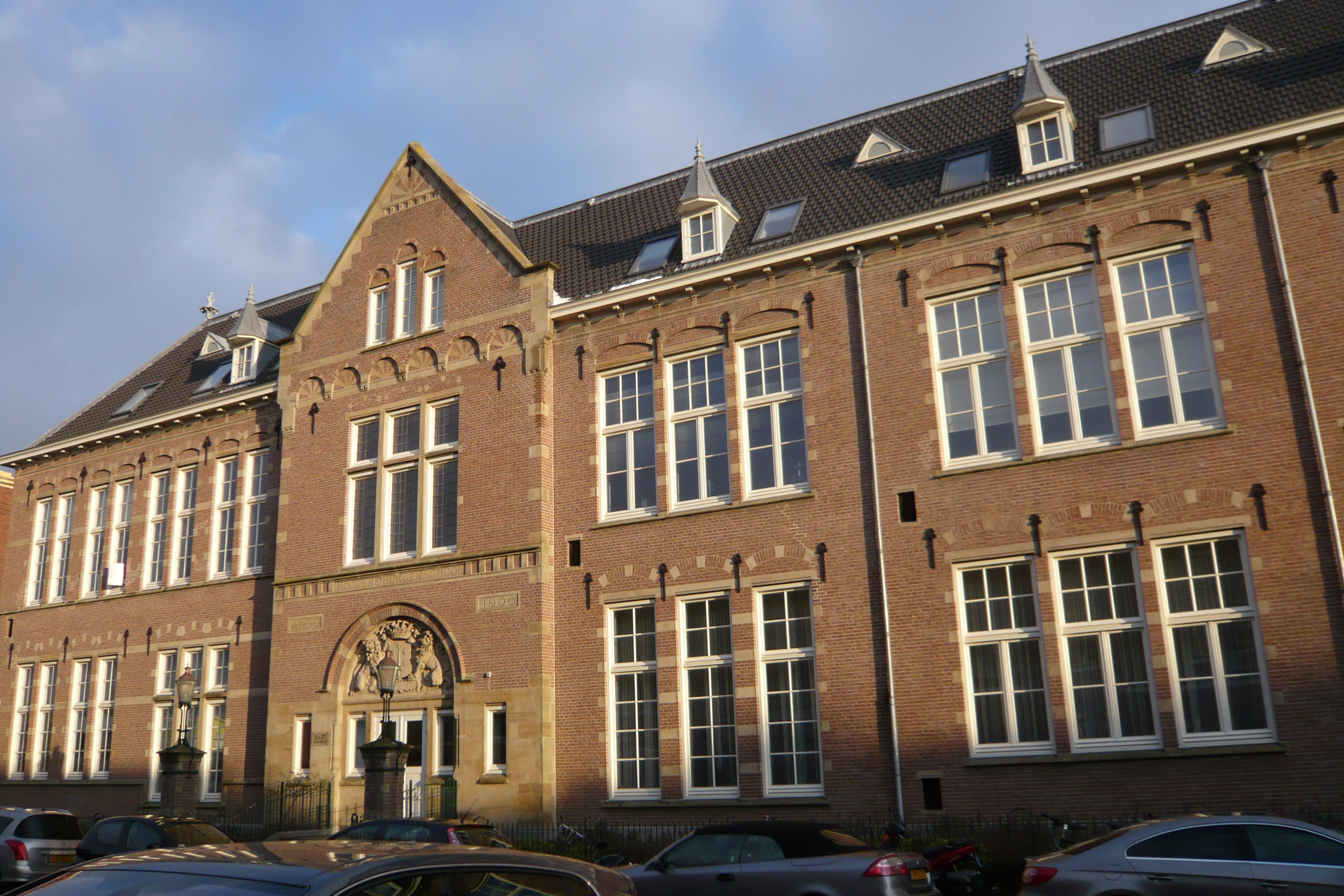
- Zijlvest 27 (corner Vestestraat-Oude Zijlvest), Haarlem, Netherlands

Information
- Type: Public Hogere burgerschool, Lyceum, and (for a few years) Gymnasium
- Motto: Originally occupying an entire city block, the building was built in 1906 to replace cramped quarters in the Jacobijnestraat
- Established: 1864

The Hoogere Burger School is a former HBS Hogere burgerschool on the Zijlvest, Haarlem, The Netherlands. It was one of the oldest public schools in Haarlem, moved from the Jacobijnestraat and built as a boys school in 1906. It has been converted into apartments.

== History ==
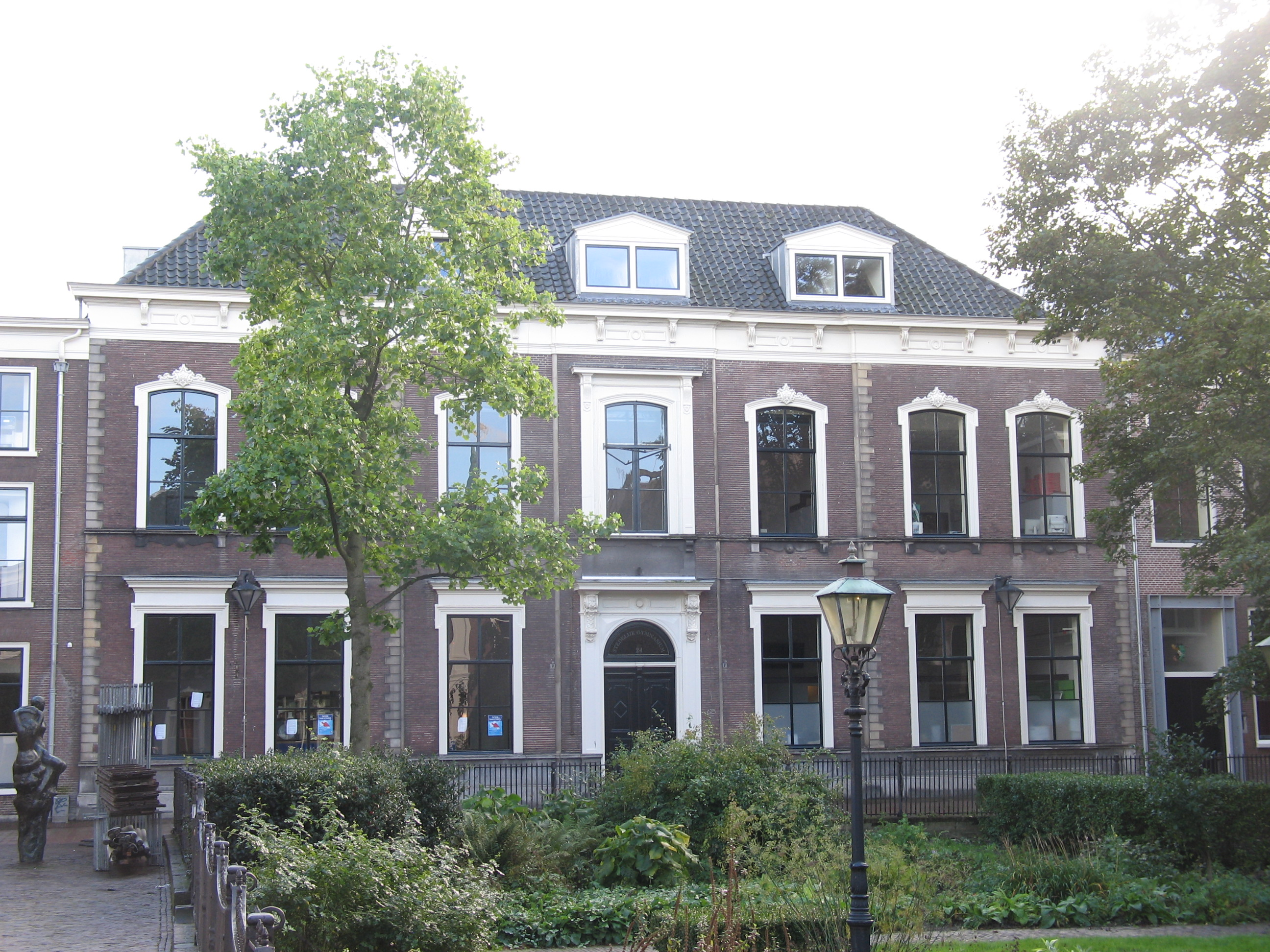
Original location in the Jacobijnestraat in 1864

This school was founded as a city HBS in 1864 next to the Stedelijk Gymnasium Haarlem. The HBS-b was a five-year educational system, and until 1875 it was actually merged with the Stedelijk. In the first grade there were 76 HBS students and 19 gymnasium students, all boys. In 1887 the school opened for girls, and four joined that year. The girls were not allowed to follow gym class with the boys, but could complete the five-year course. When it was merged with the Stedelijk, the school was popular with boys from the Dutch colony in Indonesia desiring a high quality classical education, and several noble families from Indonesia sent their sons there. The Stedelijk separated in 1875, but merged again from 1925 to 1933 as a lyceum. The second merger was a success, and the school grew from 285 students in 1925 to 503 students in 1933. In 1933 the Stedelijk separated again.

In 1958 the school was dissolved and merged into the Lourens Costerlyceum.
