= Nicolaes Boddingius =

Dutch schoolmaster, writer and Christian minister (1605–1669)

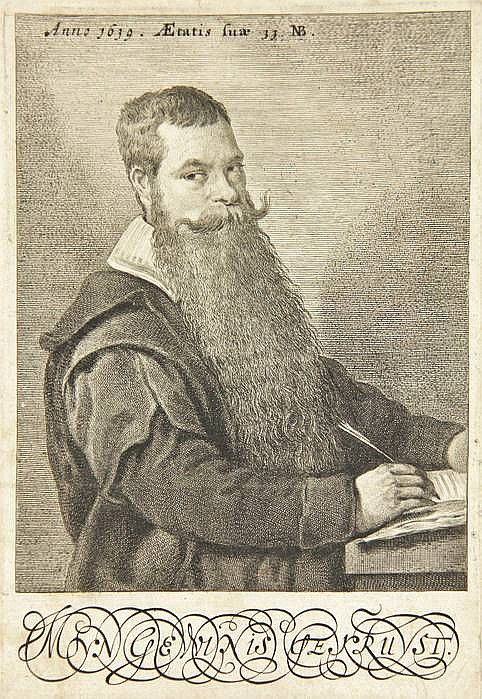
Portrait of Nicolaas Bodding van Laar at the age of 33

Nicolaes Boddingius, Nicolaas Bodding van Laer or Bodding van Laer (2 August 1605 (baptised) – 1669) was a schoolmaster, writer and minister active in Haarlem in the Netherlands.

== Biography ==
He was born in Haarlem as the fifth child of Jacob Claesz Bodding and Magdalena Heyns. He came from a well to do family and his parents operated a private school in Haarlem started by Magdalena's father, the well-known writer and publisher Peeter Heyns. His older brothers were the Dutch painters Roeland van Laer and Pieter van Laer. He became a calligrapher and teacher in Haarlem.

For most of his life, he lived in Haarlem, where after the death of his parents, sometime before 1628, he took over the school "inde Laurier Boom" which was founded by his grandfather Peeter Heyns around 1593. He also wrote several books about learning how to write, amongst them one called "Stightigh A.B.C.".

In 1655, he was appointed as rector and principal of the Latin school in Helmond, Netherlands, which position he held until 1659. In that year, through a resolution by the "Raad van State", he was appointed as minister in Bakel, Netherlands. It is believed he studied theology in Leiden, Netherlands. He died in Bakel, Netherlands.

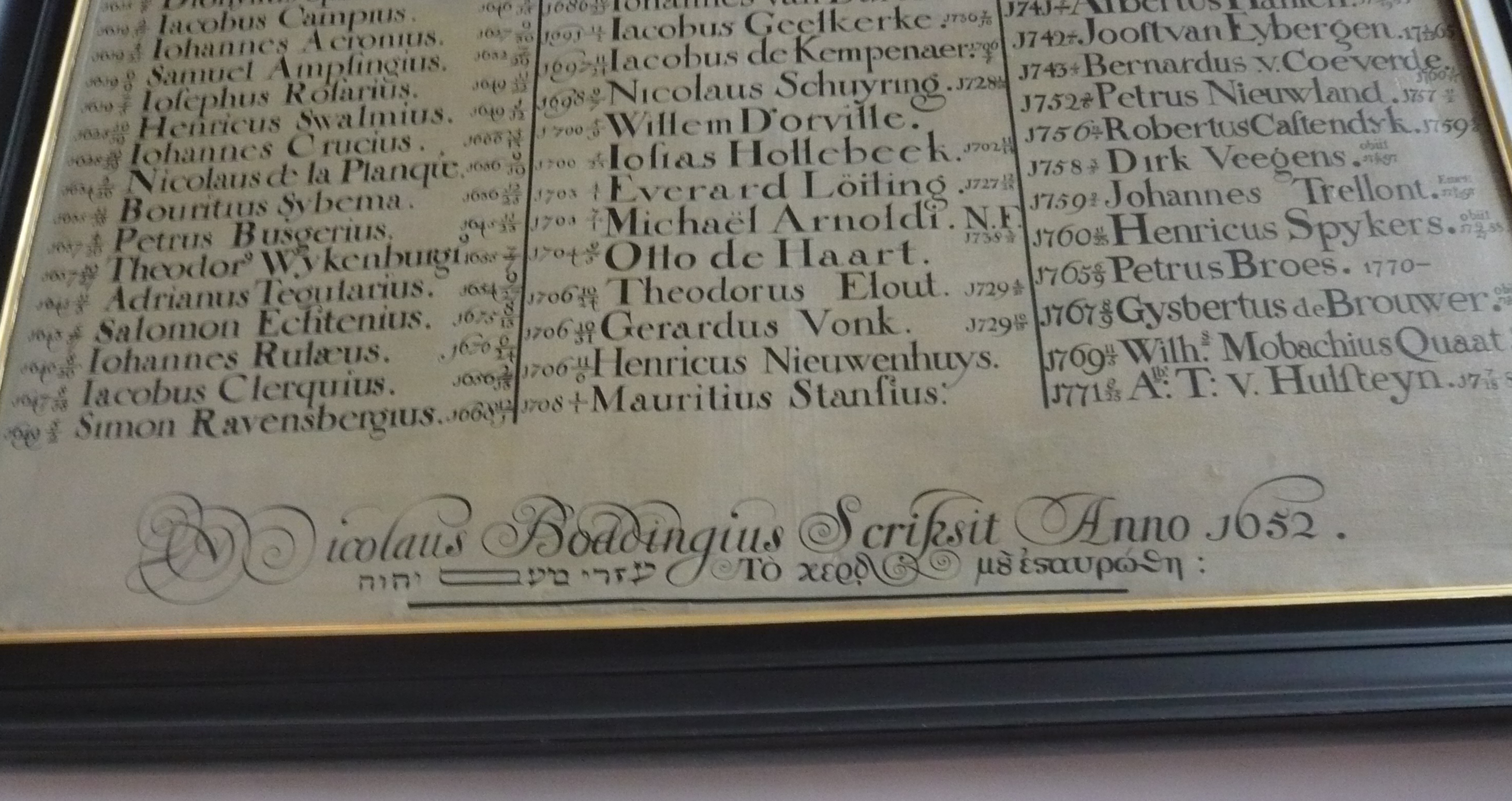
Calligraphy with Greek and Hebrew phrases under the signature of Nicolaes Bodding van Laer in the St. Bavochurch

In the Brouwerskapel of the "Grote Kerk", also named St. Bavochurch, in Haarlem, hangs a plaque with inscriptions of names of ministers who served the church since the Reformation. The plaque was made and signed by Nicolaus Boddingius, "Anno 1652". The bottom of the plate contains two phrases, one in Greek and the other in Hebrew. The Greek text resembles Philippians 3:7, "but whatever was to my profit, I now consider loss for the sake of Christ", while the Hebrew text comes from Psalm 121:2, "My help comes from the Lord". The apparent essence of both phrases is to identify that the listing of names of ministers is not for the glory of them, but for their service to God.
