= Cornelis Verbeeck =

Dutch Golden Age painter

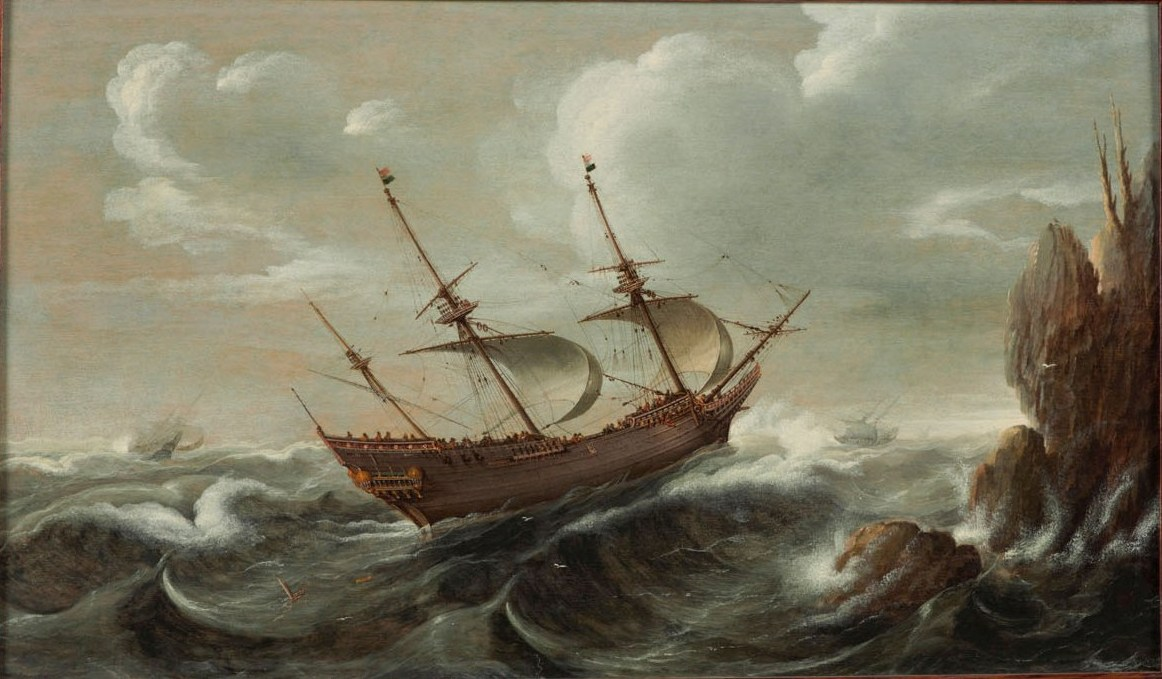
A ship in stormy seas, 1625, collection Scheepvaartmuseum

Cornelis Verbeeck (1585/1591 – after 1637), also known as Cornelis Verbeecq, was a Dutch Golden Age painter from Haarlem.

== Biography ==
He is first mentioned along with Hans Goderis in the book Harlemias by Theodorus Schrevelius as choosing marine painting. Verbeeck painted primarily marine and seascape works. He was directly influenced by Hendrick Cornelisz Vroom. Verbeeck died in 1637. Some of his works are displayed at the National Gallery of Art. He is not to be confused with the father of the seascape painter Pieter Cornelisz. Verbeeck.

According to the RKD, he was related to Johannes van der Beeck and was known as Smit for his temperamental similarity to a smith in several fights and brawls. He was married in the Dutch Reformed church in 1609 to Anna Pietersdr and they had 4 children; 3 daughters and a son. Though the son was registered as a painter, nothing is known today of him.
