= Stedelijk Gymnasium Haarlem =

Coordinates: 52°22′54″N 4°38′02″E

Latin School of Haarlem
- Stedelijk Gymnasium Haarlem
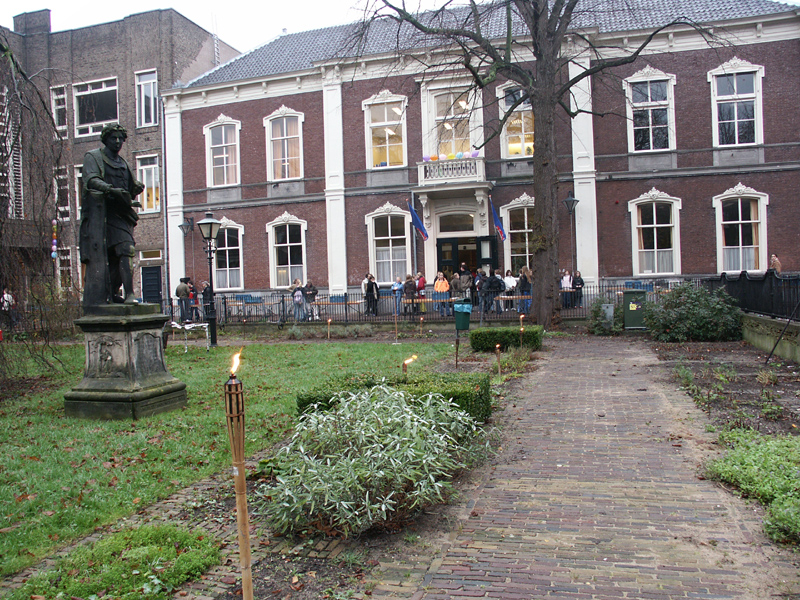
- Prinsenhof "hortus" with "Lau"

Location
- Prinsenhof 3 Haarlem 2011 TR; Netherlands

Information
- Type: Gymnasium (school)
- Motto: Vicit Vim Virtus
- Established: 1389; 637 years ago
- Principal: Jan Henk van der Werff
- Staff: teachers: 67, rest: 20
- Grades: 6 - 12
- Enrollment: 856
- Student to teacher ratio: 8.6
- Newspaper: Mirabile Lectu
- Website: www.sghaarlem.nl

The Stedelijk Gymnasium Haarlem or the Latin School of Haarlem is a secondary school in Haarlem, Netherlands. The school was founded in 1389 and is therefore one of the oldest schools in the world. The school offers voorbereidend wetenschappelijk onderwijs (preparatory scientific education) exclusively and is an independent gymnasium enrolling 822 students and 95 teachers, for a teacher/student ratio of 8.6.

== History ==
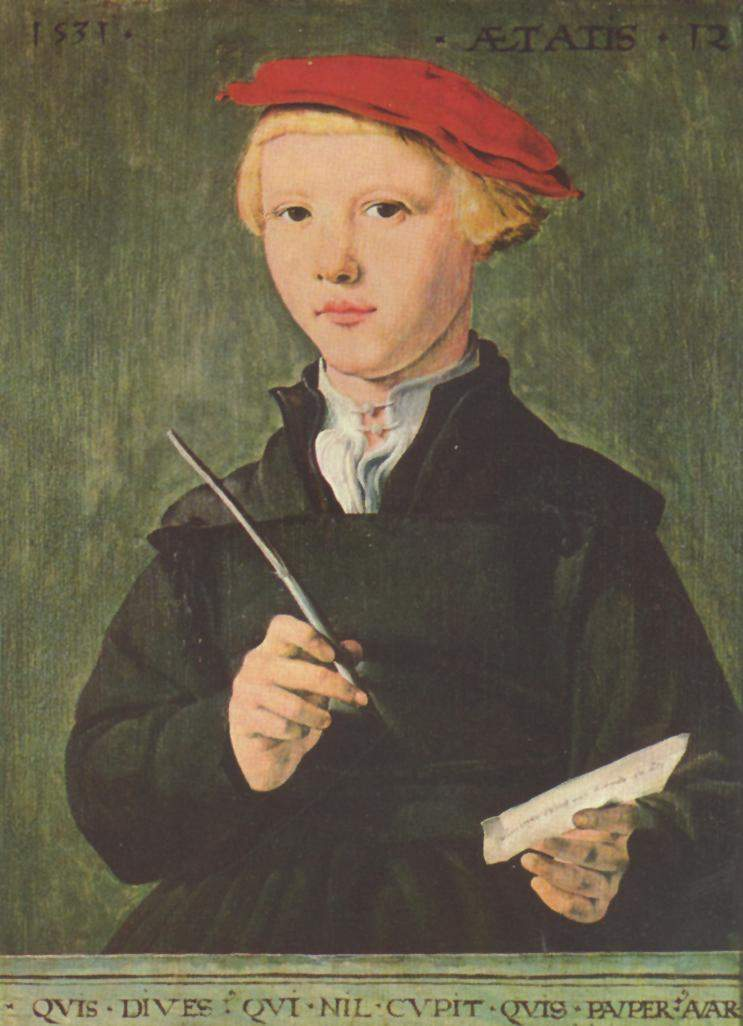
Young Haarlem scholar, c. 1531

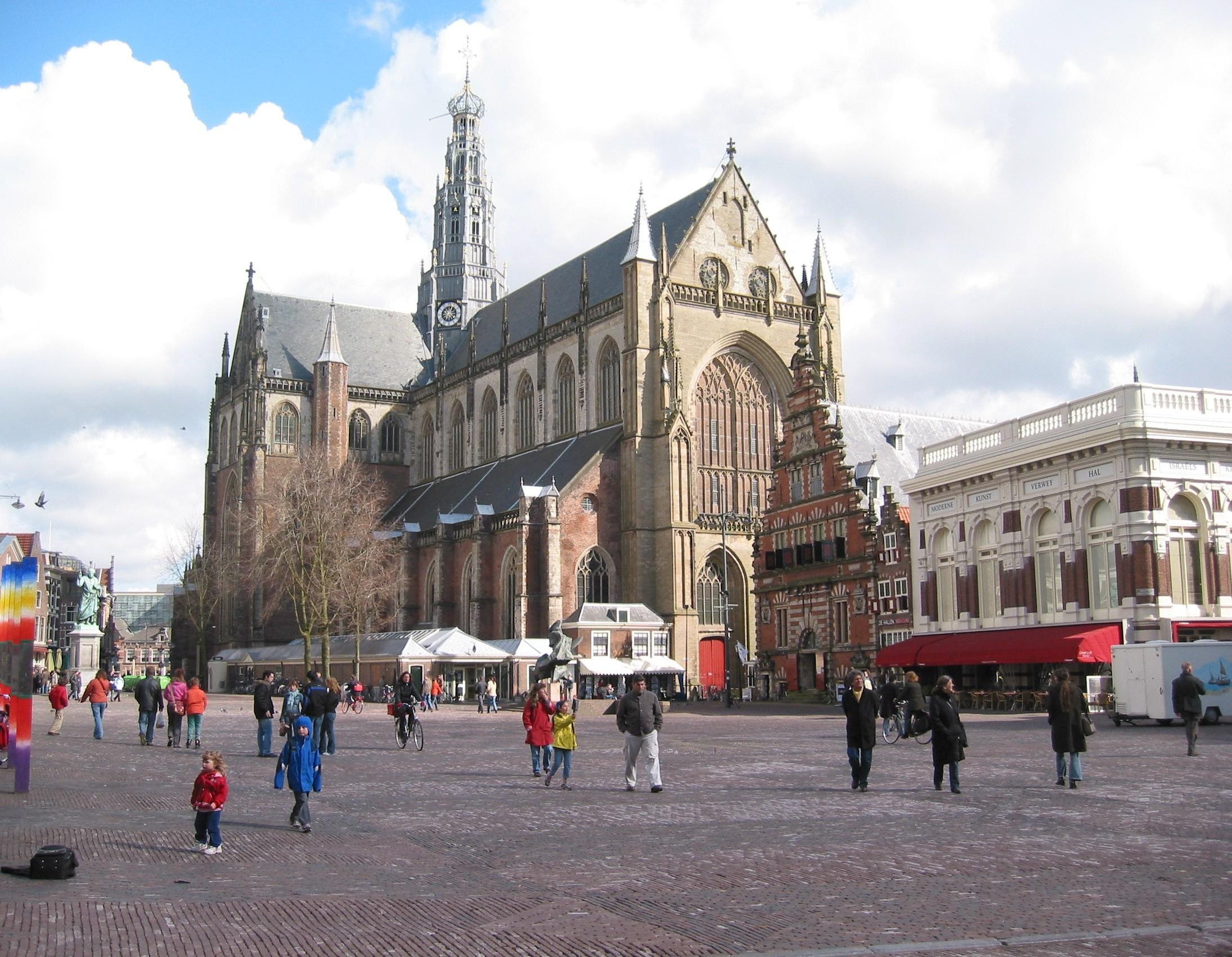
Sint-Bavokerk on the Grote Markt

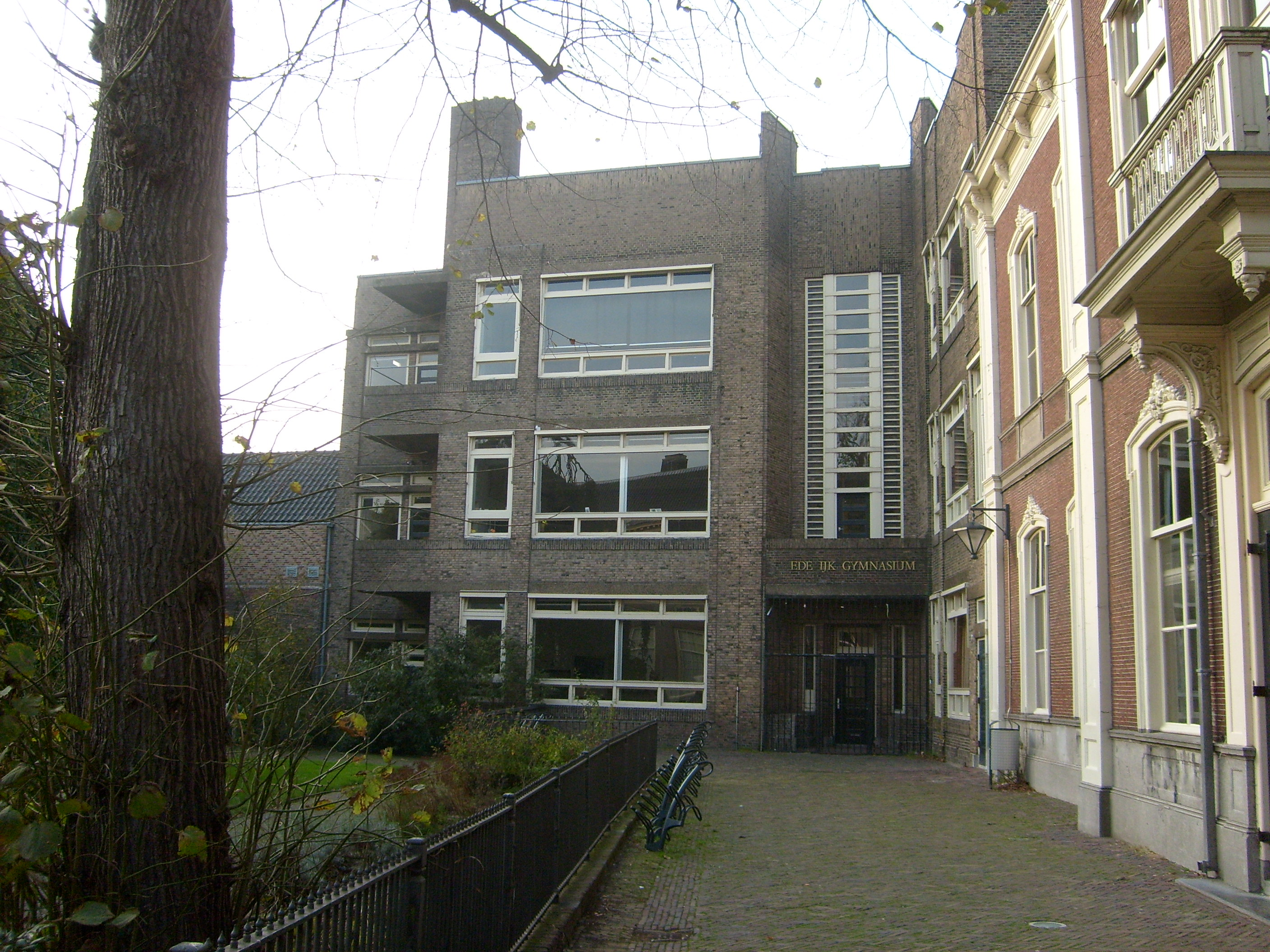
Expansion realized in 1923 by architect Jan Buijs

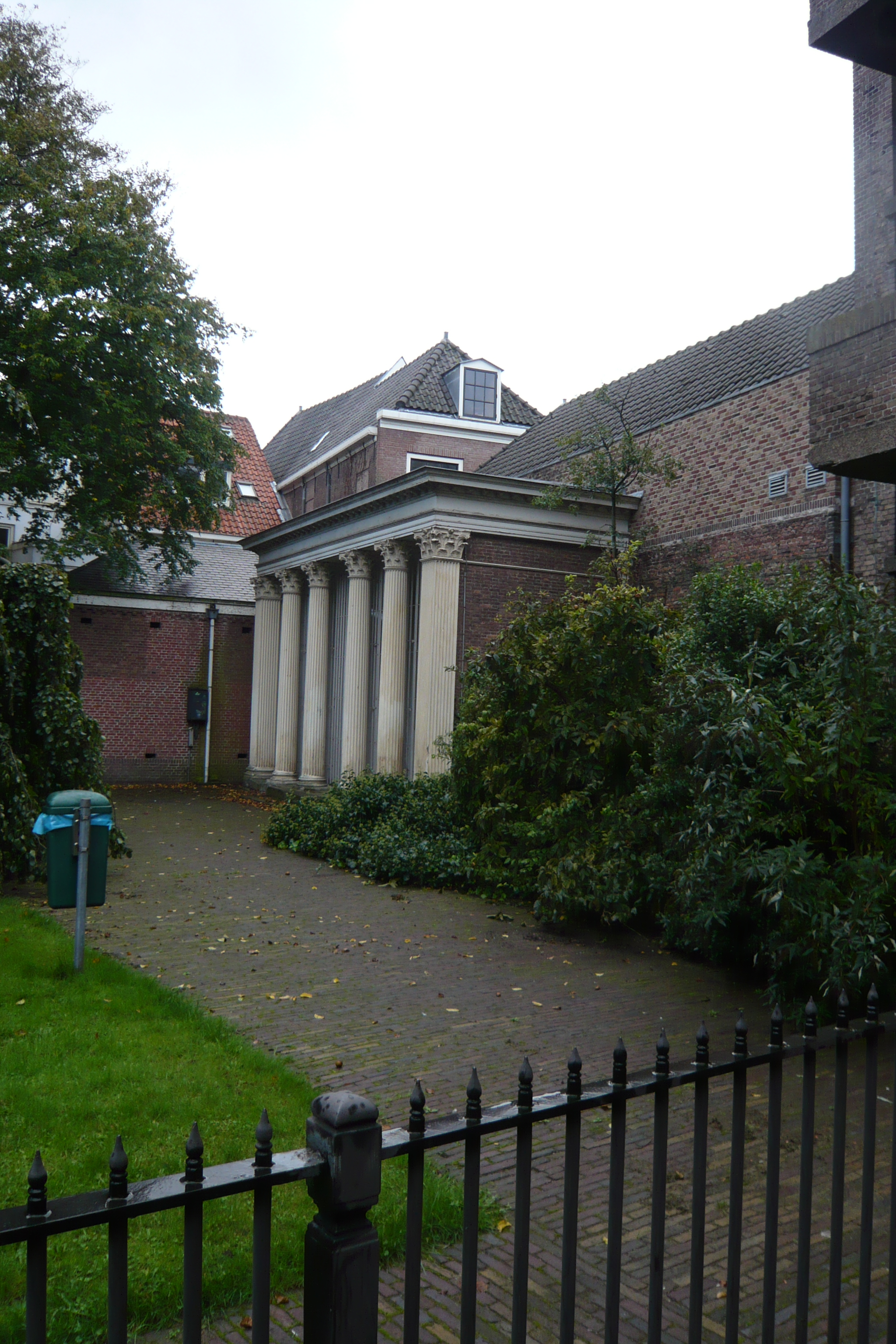
Peace temple in the hortus, built in 1648

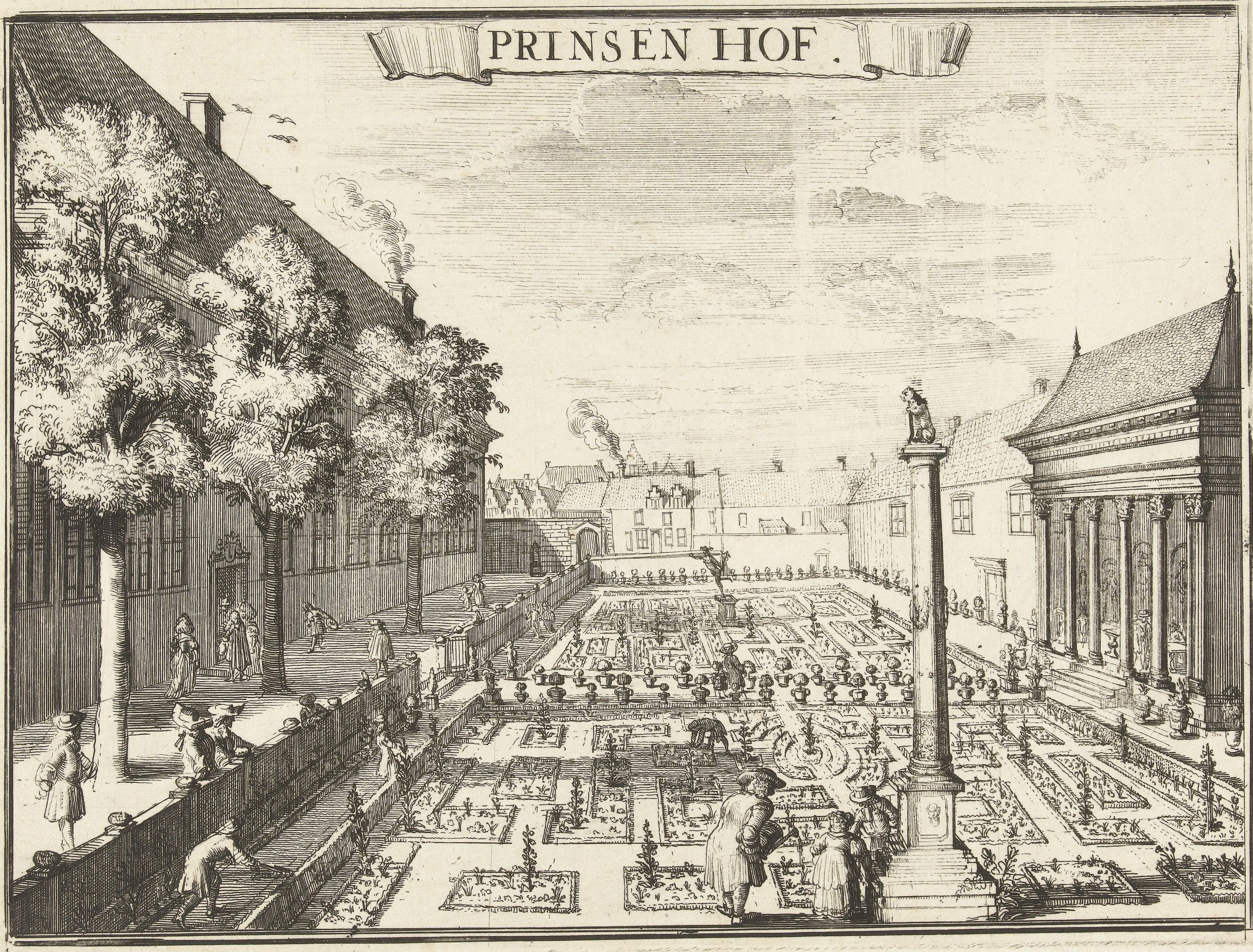
Romantic view of the Hortus from the school's front door in 1688 by Romeyn de Hooghe for the Haarlem city map made to commemorate the 500th anniversary of the siege of Haarlem. On the right is the peace temple. The whole map is on display in the St. Bavochurch.

In 1389 a Latin school was begun north of the St. Bavochurch in the Schoolsteeg. After the Siege of Haarlem when the city council seized all Catholic possessions, the school moved in 1592 to the quarters of the old Dominican Order monastery located behind the City Hall. The current school is still located there on the Prinsenhof, that can be reached via the Jacobijnestraat. It still offers a classical curriculum, including studies in Latin and Greek.

The first rector recorded is Meester Gheraerde de scoelmeester in 1301. In 1389 the city was given the privilege of appointing the rector together with the pastor of the Bavo. The rector was paid by the fees paid by students. He also took in students from outside the city and received extra fees for room and board. From his income, he paid the teachers (ondermeesters) himself. The basis for education was the artes liberales, whereby parts of the Trivium were given in Latin and the Quadrivium included music, since the choir boys needed to sing in church. For boys studying theology, Hebrew lessons were given in addition to Latin (Greek only became available from 1522). Students wanting to continue their studies, needed to leave the country before the Leiden University was founded in 1579. According to the archives of the Heilige Geest, a religious institution formerly located at what is now the Hofje van Oorschot, they had a fund from 1502 to 1577 (the Satisfactie) for sending good students to Cologne to further their studies there. In 1553, when the school had been run by Junius, they even petitioned Charles V, Holy Roman Emperor for the right to found a university in Haarlem, but this was never answered. After the Satisfactie van Haarlem in 1577, the books of all the monasteries and cloisters in Haarlem were given to the Latin school and the rector Cornelis Schonaeus (1540–1611) took two weeks to draw up the inventory list. This same Schonaeus was the one who was in charge of moving the school from the schoolsteeg to the current location in 1583. He almost lost his job when the council decided to start a collegie or university there, but perhaps because Leiden had already been founded, this never happened. He did complete a major reorganization of the school that was then placed in the hands of his successor, Theodorus Schrevelius.

During the years 1864–1875 and again from 1925 to 1933, the school merged with the Hogere Burger School, due to a decrease in enrollment.

== Notable alumni ==
- Amir Sjarifoeddin – second Prime Minister of the Indonesian Republic
- Thierry Baudet – politician, academic and journalist
- Hadrianus Junius (1550–1552)
- Theodorus Schrevelius – humanist, writer and poet
- Job Cohen – former Mayor of Amsterdam and in 2010 leader of the Labour Party (Netherlands)
- Jessica Durlacher – writer
- Hamengkubuwono IX – ninth Sultan of Yogyakarta
- Ed Spanjaard – conductor
- L.H. Wiener – writer
- Jan Kops – Baptist preacher and professor of agronomy at the University of Utrecht
- Edward Brongersma – Dutch politician, lawyer, jurist and criminologist
- Christianus Cornelis Uhlenbeck – Dutch linguist, anthropologist and writer
- Jan Kruseman – Dutch jurist and president of the Court of Amsterdam
- Guido van Rossum – Dutch computer programmer
- Martijn Bolkestein – Dutch politician

== See also ==
- List of the oldest schools in the world
