= Cornelis Schrevel =

Dutch scholar

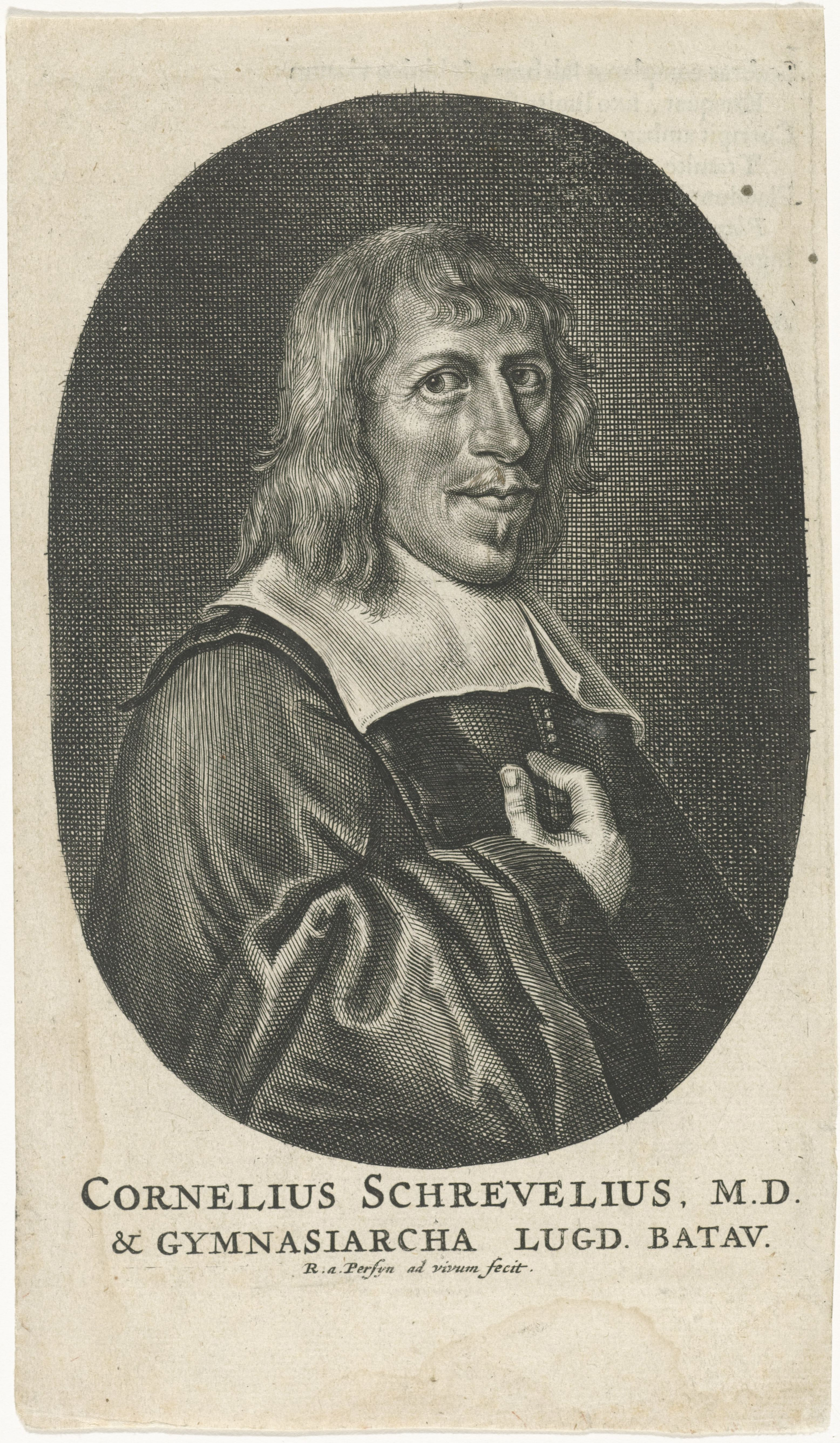
Portrait of Cornelis Schrevel by Reinier van Persijn.

Cornelis Schrevel (bapt. 13 April 1608 – 1664) was a Dutch physician and scholar.

Schrevel was born in Haarlem. He studied medicine at Leiden University and replaced his father Theodorus Schrevelius as head of the college faculty at Leiden in 1642. He published a Latin-Greek lexicon and edited many classical authors, including an edition of Curtius Rufus owned by Thomas Jefferson. Among his other editions, Six authors of the Historia Augusta, Leyden 1661. He died in Leiden.

The Lexicon ran to scores of editions in half-a-dozen languages, to the early nineteenth century; an expansion of 1663 was edited by Joseph Hill.
