= Hans Goderis =

Dutch Golden Age painter

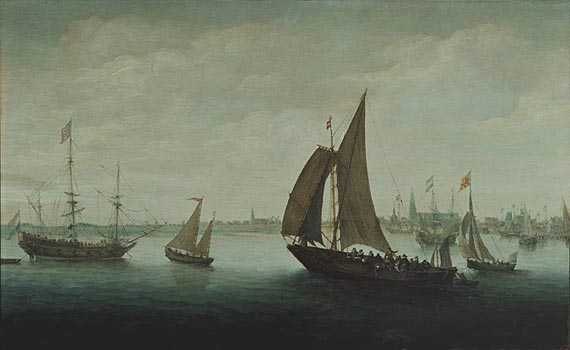
Two ships leaving the harbour, with Hoorn in the background, Westfries Museum

Hans Goderis (1595/1600, Haarlem – 1656/1659, Haarlem) was a Dutch Golden Age painter.

== Biography ==
Goderis was the son of Joris Goderis and Marijntgen Lijbaerts. He is first mentioned along with Cornelis Verbeeck in the book Harlemias by Theodorus Schrevelius as choosing marine painting. Goderis painted primarily marine and seascape works. According to the RKD, he was the pupil of Jan Porcellis.
