= Jan Philipsz van Bouckhorst =

Dutch Golden Age painter

- Born: 1588
- Died: September 1631 (aged 42–43)
- Occupation: Painter, drawer

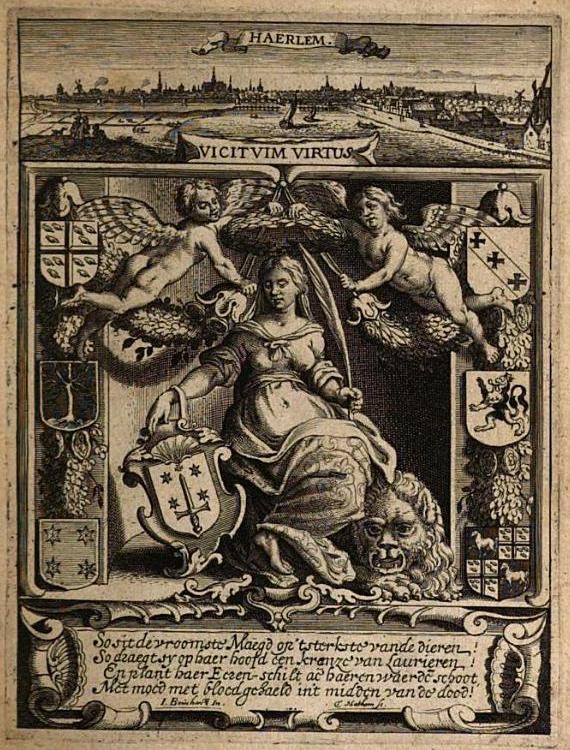
Titlepage to Samuel Ampzing's 'Description of Haarlem

Jan Philipszoon (abbr. Philipsz.) van Bouckhorst (1588 – 1631), was a Dutch Golden Age painter.

== Biography ==
He was born in Haarlem, where he was trained by his father Philips Jansz. van Bouckhorst. He became 'vinder' in 1628, and in 1630 and 1631 deacon of the Haarlem Guild of St. Luke. He was a stained glass artist and landscape painter and became the teacher of Pieter Jansz (1612-1672). He died in Haarlem in 1631.
