= Parade of the Fat Ox at the Paris Carnival =

Festive tradition from Paris

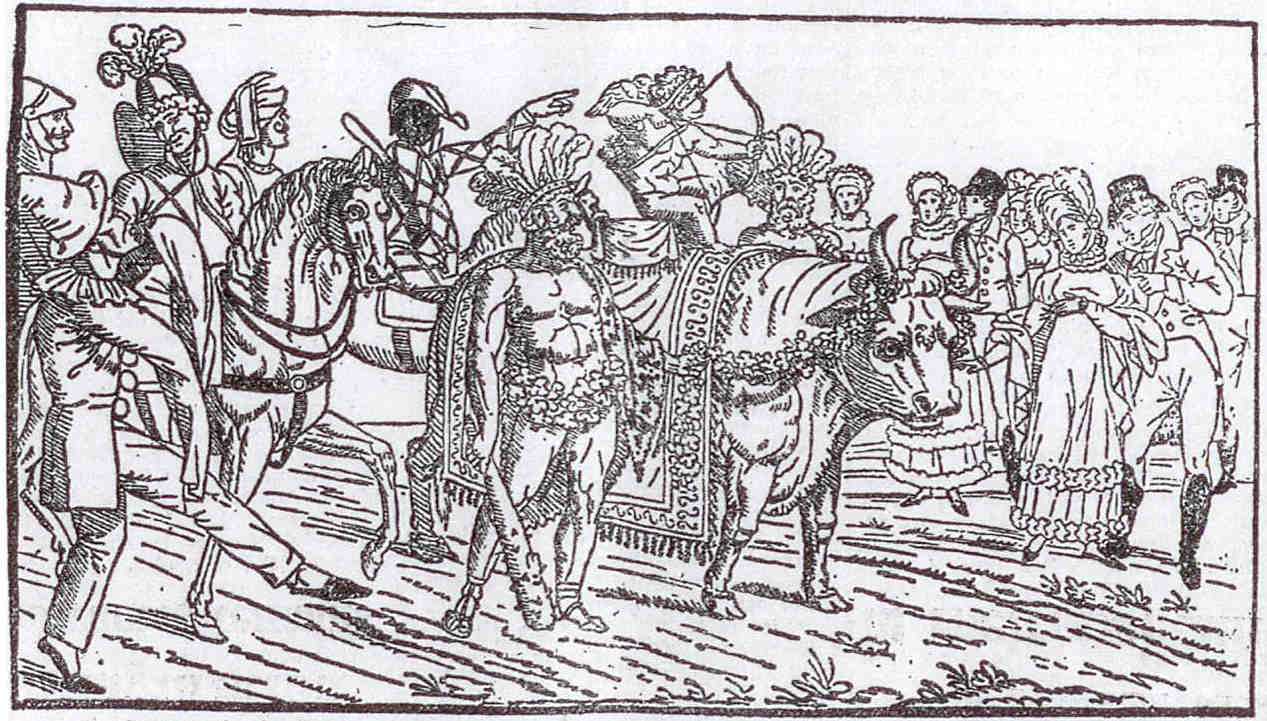
- Boeuf Gras parade of 1816
- Also called: Fête du Bœuf Gras, Cavalcade du Bœuf Gras, Fête du Bœuf villé, viellé ou violé
- Observed by: Paris
- Type: Festival
- Celebrations: Paris Carnival
- Date: Generally in February or March
- Related to: Bœuf Gras

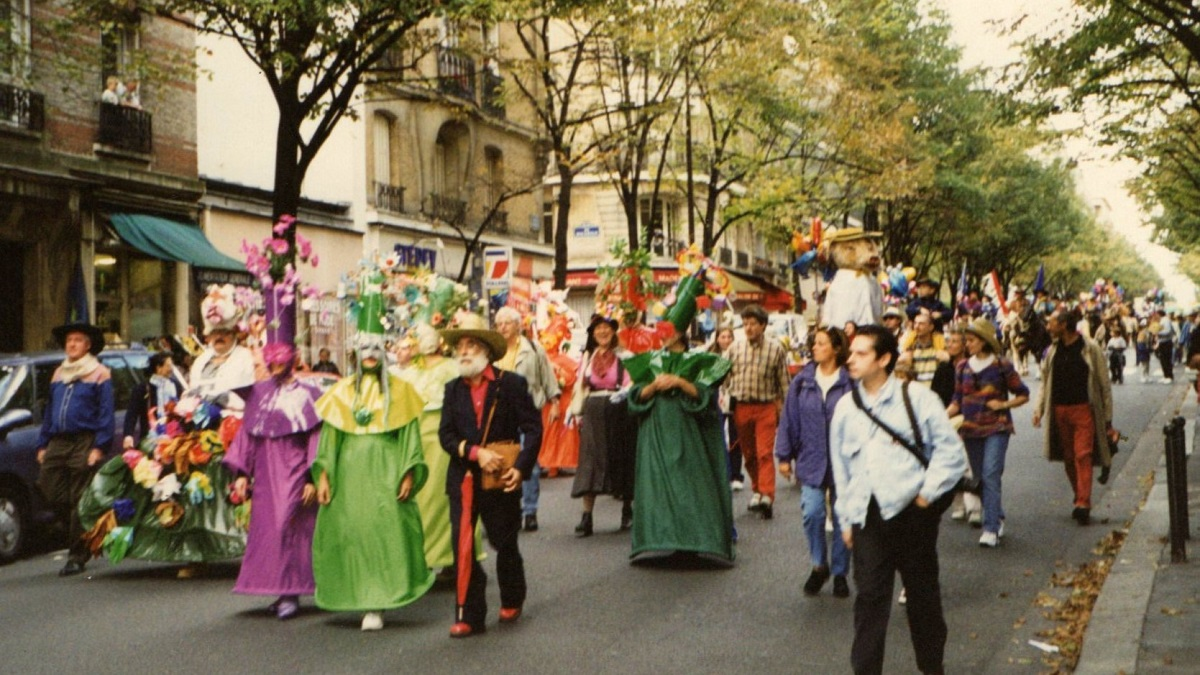
Carnaval de Paris, promenade du Bœuf gras in 1999, with, from left to right, Alain Riou, Catherine Poulain, Rafael Estève, Jean-Philippe Dirson

The Parade of the Fat Ox, also referred to as the "Festival of the Fat Ox," "Cavalcade of the Fat Ox," "Festival of the Town Ox" (paraded through the city), or "Festival of the Violled Ox" (paraded to the sound of the viol or hurdy-gurdy), is an ancient festive tradition held during the Paris Carnival. It involves Parisian butchers or butcher boys, often adorned in costumes representing savages, sacrificers, or victims, solemnly parading one or more decorated fat oxen accompanied by music. The presence of other costumed participants and floats further augments the procession. Before the conclusion of the 20th century, the slaughter of oxen occurred after the conclusion of the festivities, with the meat subsequently being made available for commercial sale. From 1845 to the early 20th century, the animals were given names inspired by current events, popular songs, operettas, or contemporary literature.

The oldest known reference to this festival dates to 1712, yet it was already regarded as ancient. Several authors claim that it is a remnant of a ritual prior to Christianization, often thought to have originated in ancient Egypt. Alternatively, some scholars have proposed that its origins lie in astrological worship, specifically the celebration of the entry of the Sun into the constellation of Taurus. Additionally, the tradition has been linked to a Lenten butcher who, upon producing the fattest ox, was granted the exclusive right to sell meat during Lent to those exempted from fasting. From a more pragmatic perspective, the Carnival and the Fat Ox symbolize a season of abundance and represent the final opportunity for feasting before the onset of the fasting period.

The parade was banned during the French Revolution (1789–1799) and then revived in 1806, continuing almost uninterrupted until 1870, with a hiatus from 1848 to 1850 due to the 1848 revolution. However, France's defeat in the Franco-Prussian War (1870), the Paris Commune (1871), and legal issues led to the suspension of this tradition. The Fat Ox returned to the Carnival in 1896, albeit with intermittent participation in the early 20th century, and made a brief reappearance in 1951 and 1952. Following these events, the Fat Ox Parade and the Paris Carnival ceased to be organized, reemerging only in 1998.

The Fat Ox Parade has attracted significant public attention, garnering the attention of the general public and prominent figures in the intellectual and artistic spheres. This event has served as a source of inspiration for a variety of artistic and cultural expressions, including theatrical plays, operettas, references in La traviata, political, satirical, comedic, and carnival songs, as well as poetry. Romantic literature also refers to the Fat Ox. The ox has been depicted in drawings, prints, caricatures, paintings, magic lantern slides, and photographs. The parade's popularity attracted the attention of merchants, industrialists, and politicians, who sought to use it for advertising purposes.

== History of the event ==
=== Possible origins of the festival ===
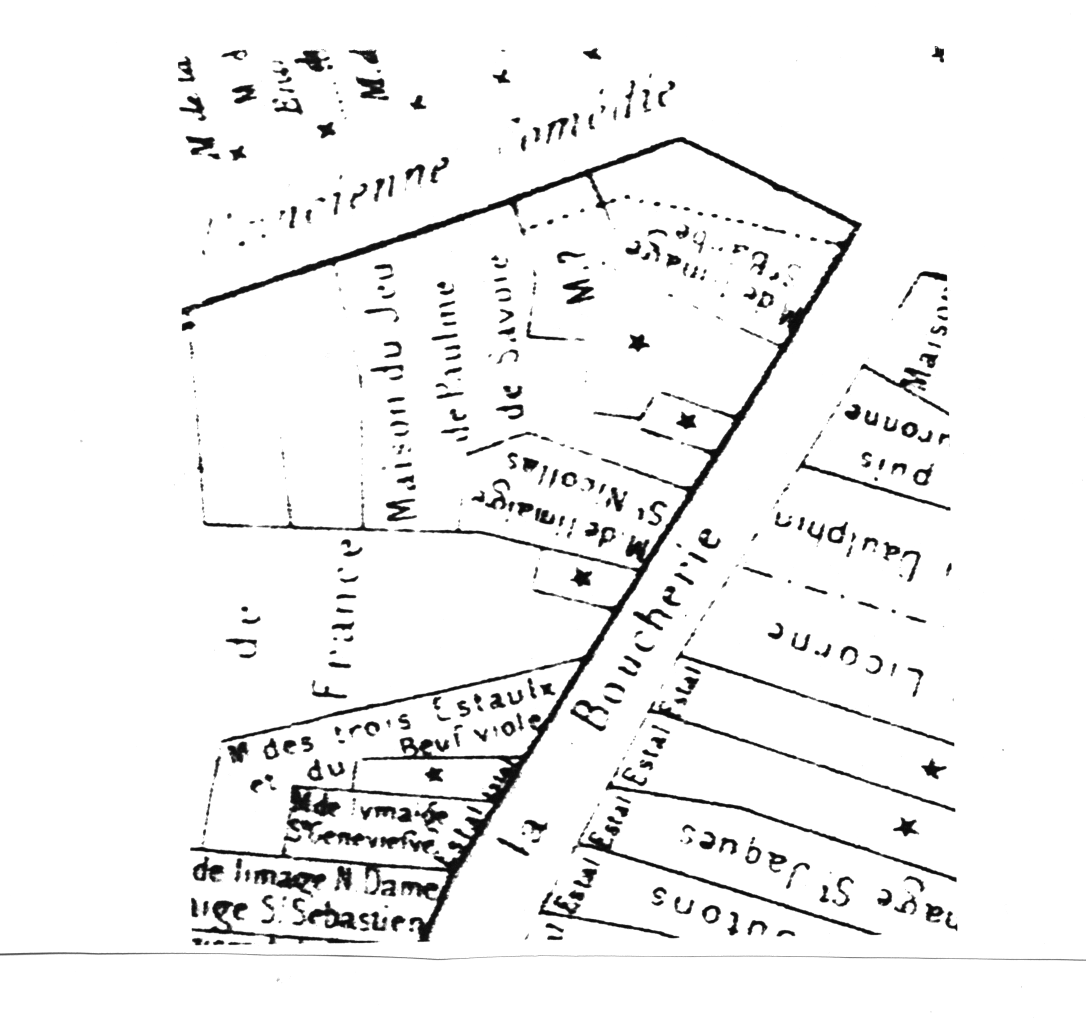
Detail of the map of Berty, where the "Maison des Trois Estaulx et du Beuf violé" is located.

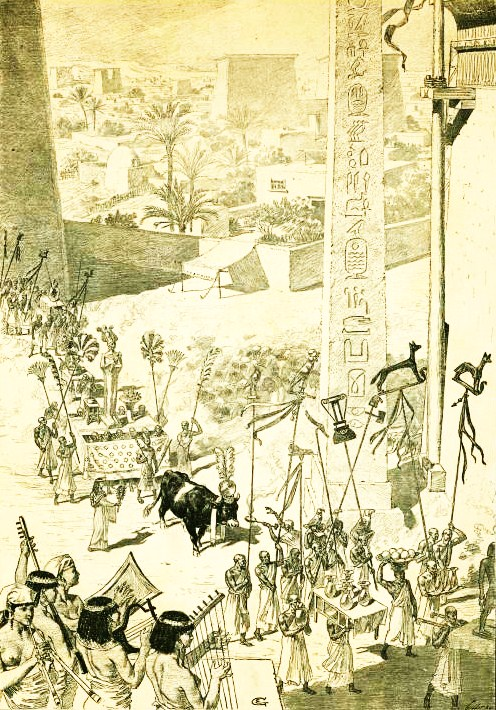
The fable of the Egyptian origin of the Bœuf Gras, as seen by Charles Gillot in 1884.

The precise origins and date of this festival, also referred to as Bœuf violé or viellé, Bœuf villé, or Bœuf violé, remain a subject of scholarly debate. The festival's historical evolution, particularly the role of the ox in parading through the city to the sound of the viol or hurdy-gurdy, is a topic of interest.

A document dating to 1274 makes reference to a "House of the Three Estaulx and the Violled Ox," which is understood to be a sign depicting three market stalls and an ox parading to music. This house is also depicted on Sheet 9 of the Berty Archaeological Map of Paris. However, there is an absence of definitive evidence linking this reference explicitly to the Parade of the Fat Ox.

Some explanations claim that the event is a remnant of an ancient pre-Christian ritual. In a 1739 issue of Mercure de France describing the Parade of the Fat Ox, it states: "This very old custom appears to be a remnant of certain pagan festivals, particularly sacrifices offered to false gods. Indeed, the butcher boys dress for this ceremony much like the slaves of sacrificers; the Fat Ox is adorned in the same manner as those sacrificed as victims, and the butchers carry instruments similar to those used in sacrifices." In a 1783 issue of Correspondance Secrète, the festival reminded a spectator of "the Bacchanalia and the mysteries of the Egyptians." In the 1805 program, the poet, songwriter, playwright, and satirist Antoine-Pierre-Augustin de Piis compared it to a "procession of the Apis bull." (Note: It is preserved in the Le Senne collection at the BNF.) This interpretation was later echoed by Louis-Charles Bizet and Théophile Gautier in 1847, and by Léo Delibes, who composed music in his youth for a comic text illustrating the ancient festival. This work gained some fame and was sung in 1891 at the Théâtre des Bouffes-Parisiens by Désiré and Léonce:

Honneur au bœuf Apis,
À l'enfant de Memphis;
C'est le roi du bétail,
Contemplez son poitrail.
On admirait sa peau
Quand il n'était qu'un veau;
Depuis qu'il est taureau,
Mon Dieu qu'il est donc beau !
Honor to the Apis bull,
To the child of Memphis;
He is the king of cattle,
Admire his broad chest.
We admired his skin
When he was but a calf;

Now that he's a bull,
My God, how beautiful he is!

However, the Egyptian god Apis is not a bull but a sacred ox. In 1852, Edmond Auguste Texier claimed that the festival of the god Apis was passed down to the Greeks and Romans in the form of the cult of Mithras—though he overlooked its Eastern origins—and subsequently spread to Gaul through conquest. Some authors also suggest that the Gaulish deity Tarvos Trigaranos may be a likely origin for the Fat Ox.

Jacques Antoine Dulaure posited that the festival was initially celebrated at the spring equinox, when the sun entered the sign of Taurus, potentially deriving from astral worship. This interpretation was endorsed by the authors of Paris Pittoresque.

An additional explanation is provided in a document printed in 1896, which is preserved in the Carnival Archives of the Historical Library of the City of Paris: (Note: See Bibliothèque historique de la ville de Paris.)

For a long time, civil and religious laws prohibited the consumption of fatty foods during Lent, except for the sick. Butchers were forbidden from displaying or selling meat during this period without facing severe penalties. Nevertheless, to meet the needs of those exempt from abstinence, someone had to supply this food upon a doctor's order.

Thus, the Lenten butcher was established. To avoid offending sensitivities, a contest was held among all the butchers, and the privilege was granted to the one who produced the largest and fattest ox, as judged by the local butchers.

The ox, crowned with flowers, was triumphantly paraded through the streets and squares of the city to the sound of trumpets so that everyone could recognize the Lenten butcher and his marvelous product.

According to the authors of the Dictionary of Crafts and Trades (2012), Carnival and the Fat Ox symbolize abundance and the final opportunity to indulge before the Lenten fast. Ethnologist Arnold van Gennep viewed the Parade as the emblem of the butchers' guild. The Carnival, a period of meat consumption, honored butchers, who profited from this demand. He believed it likely emerged during the height or formation of medieval guilds and thus served an advertising function.

Folklore group leader Suzanne Manot synthesized a series of theories, proposing that the Parade of the Fat Ox symbolizes the Christianization of ancient festivals—including Egyptian, Greek, Roman, and Gaulish traditions—observed at the spring equinox in tribute to oxen believed to possess divine abilities. She further suggested that butchers' guilds have played a pivotal role in preserving this tradition, adapting it into a carnival and a promotional event.

=== The first mentions ===
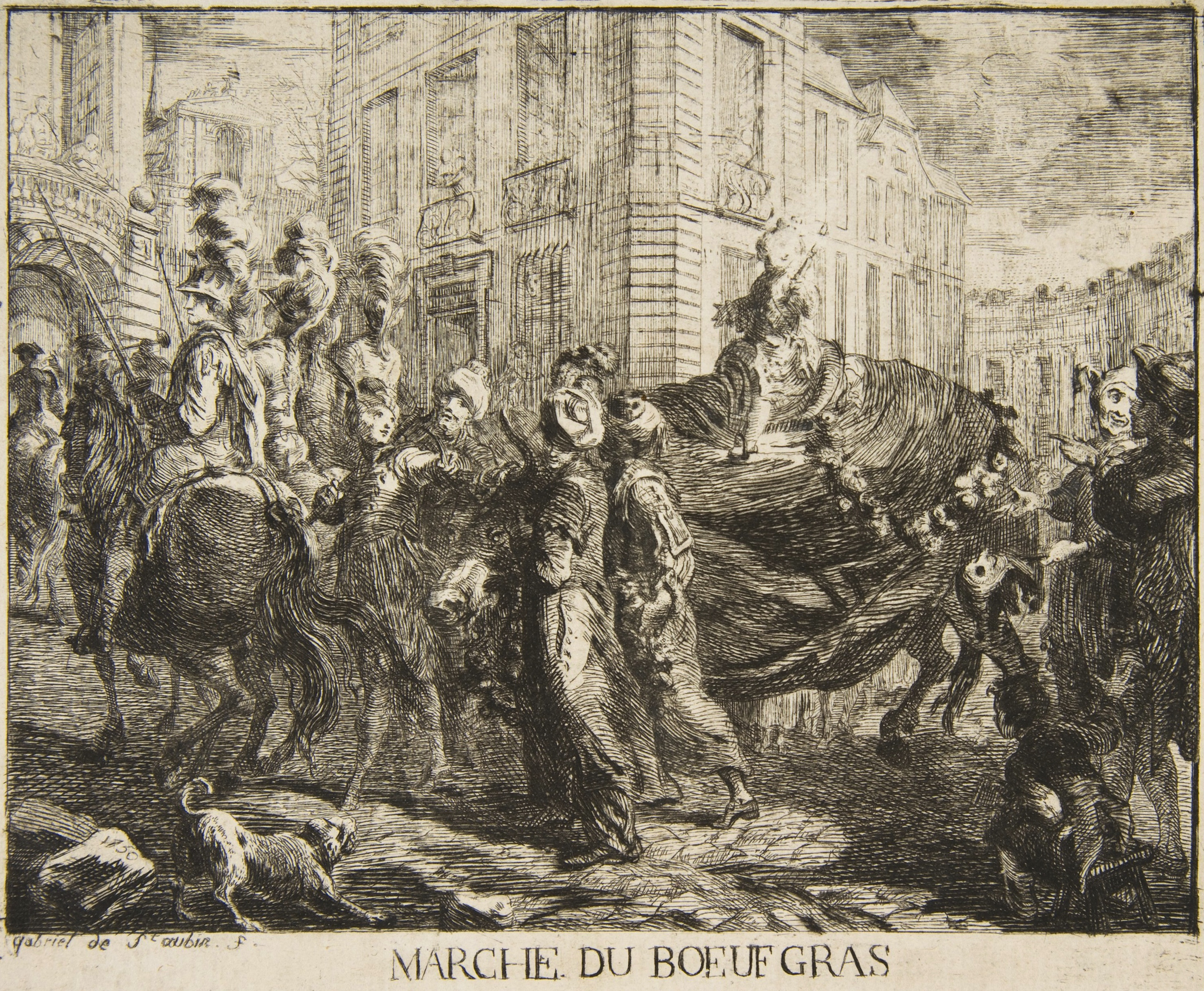
Marche du bœuf gras, engraving by Gabriel de Saint-Aubin, 1750.

The first documented reference to the Promenade of the Fat Ox in Paris was recorded in 1712, cited in a theatrical placard presented during the Carnival: Placards of Parisian Festivities Presented to the Public by the Great Troupe of Rope Dancers from the Jeu de paume d'Orléans at the Saint-Germain Fair, February 1712. The inclusion of the Fat Ox in this piece indicates the early existence of this celebration.

A particularly thorough account of the promenade on Fat Thursday was published in the Mercure de France in 1739. The following day, a second parade was organized by a different group of butchers. From the mid-18th century onward, references to the event became increasingly prevalent.

=== The height of the parades ===
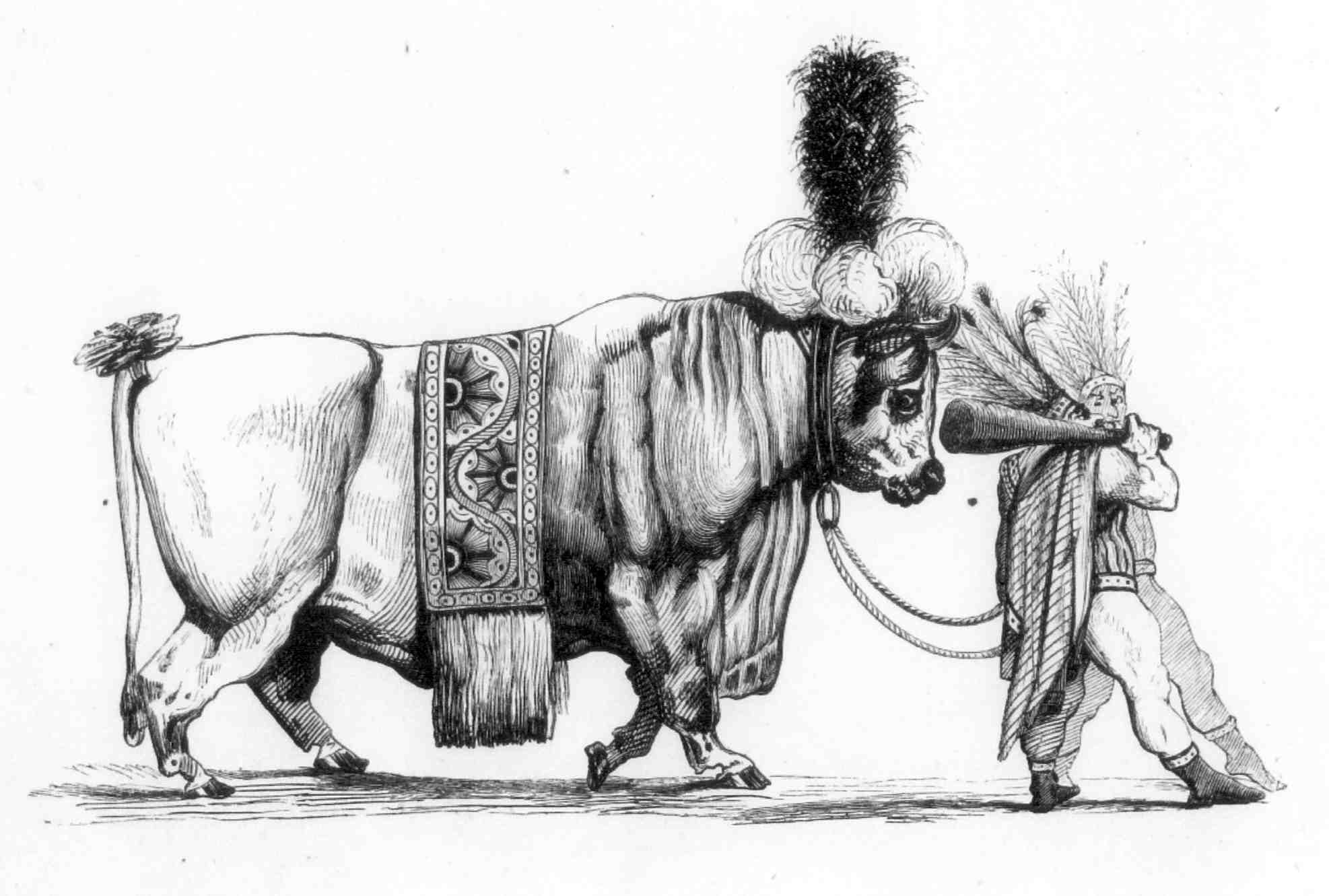
Le Bœuf Gras conduit par ses sacrificateurs, engraving by Porret, 1830.

The Fat Ox, in conjunction with the Paris Carnival, was prohibited during the Revolution, which commenced in 1790. Carnival festivities recommenced under the First Empire. The resurgence of the Fat Ox occurred on 23 February 1805, as part of a lavish procession. The parade transpired annually in Paris until 1870, with the exception of 1814 and 1848 to 1850.

During the First Empire, for example, in February 1813, the Child dressed as Cupid was occasionally replaced by the god Mars. Seven years later, Louvel attended the Fat Ox parade before fatally stabbing the Duke of Berry, and street festivities were subsequently banned by Police Prefect Jules Anglès. Printed programs, titled Order and Procession of the Fat Ox and decorated with engravings, were regularly distributed until the end of the Second Empire. On 14 February 1831, clashes occurred on the same day as the Fat Ox parade. Informed of the unrest, the Foreign Minister reportedly left the Legislative Body to go to his residence, where the parade was set to pass, announcing, "I'm going to see the masks."The following year's parade, initially uncertain, was eventually held under heavy police supervision. In 1846, the organizers of the parade proposed a novel innovation: the Fat Ox would be placed on a float pulled by six horses. The vehicle was tested with 258 paving stones weighing six tons—three times the ox's weight—but it broke down. As a result, Dagobert paraded on foot.

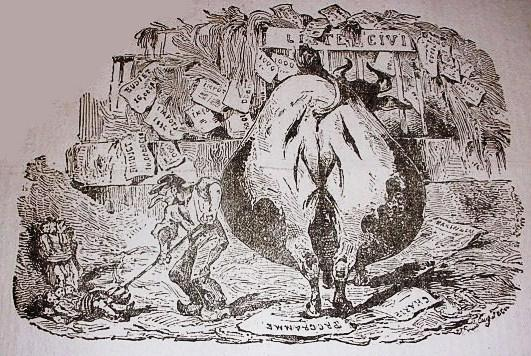
Le Bœuf Gras, 1834, cartoon against Louis-Philippe I.

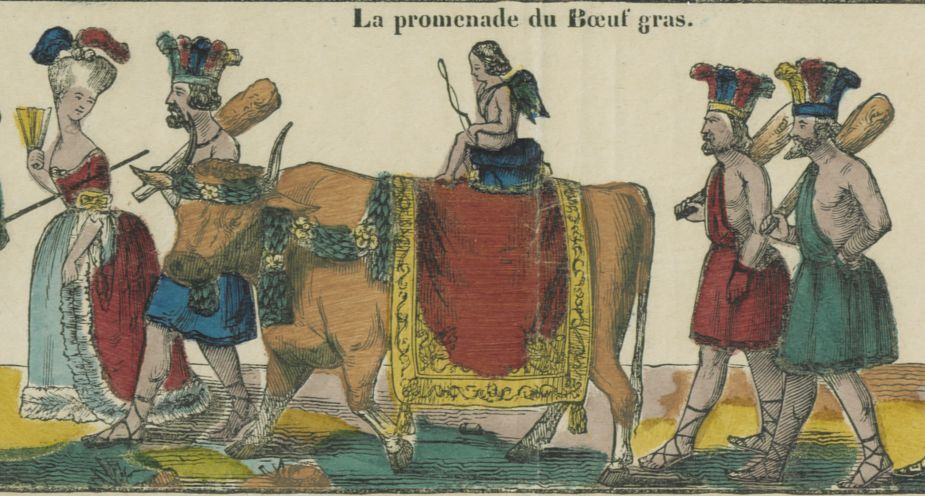
Le Bœuf gras, Imagerie d'Épinal, xylograph, 1843.

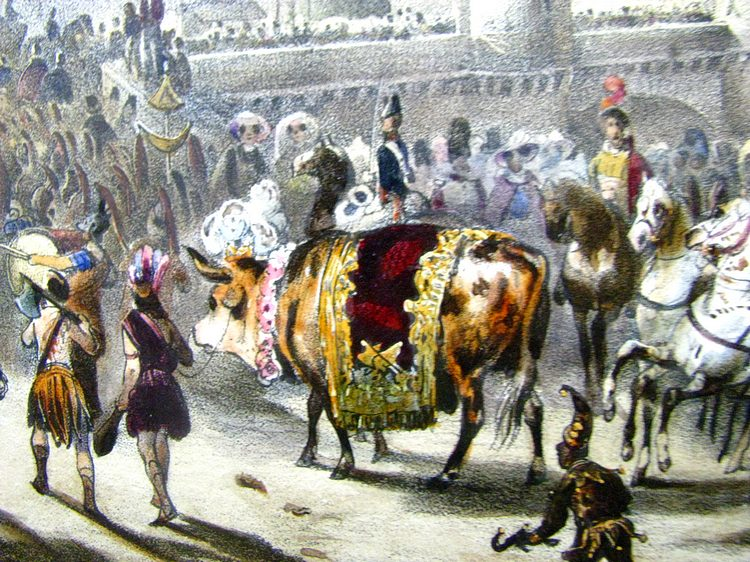
Le Bœuf Gras, detail from an anonymous watercolor print, 1843.

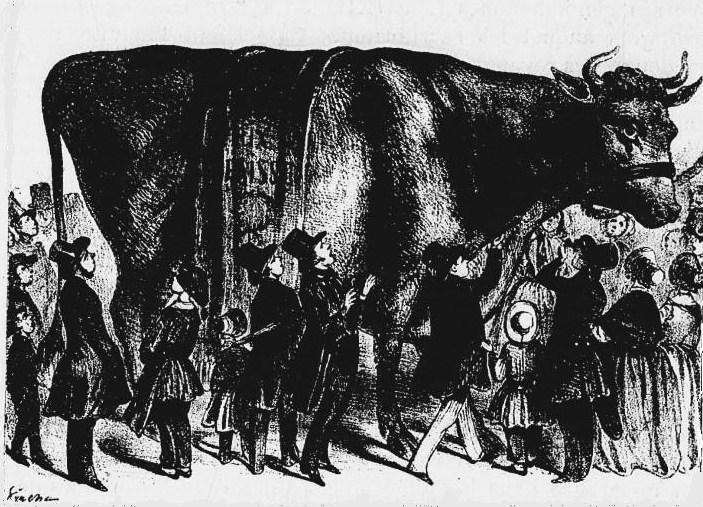
"What a prodigious beast! Si nous pouvons être un jour de cette force-là!!!", drawing by Pruche, 1843.

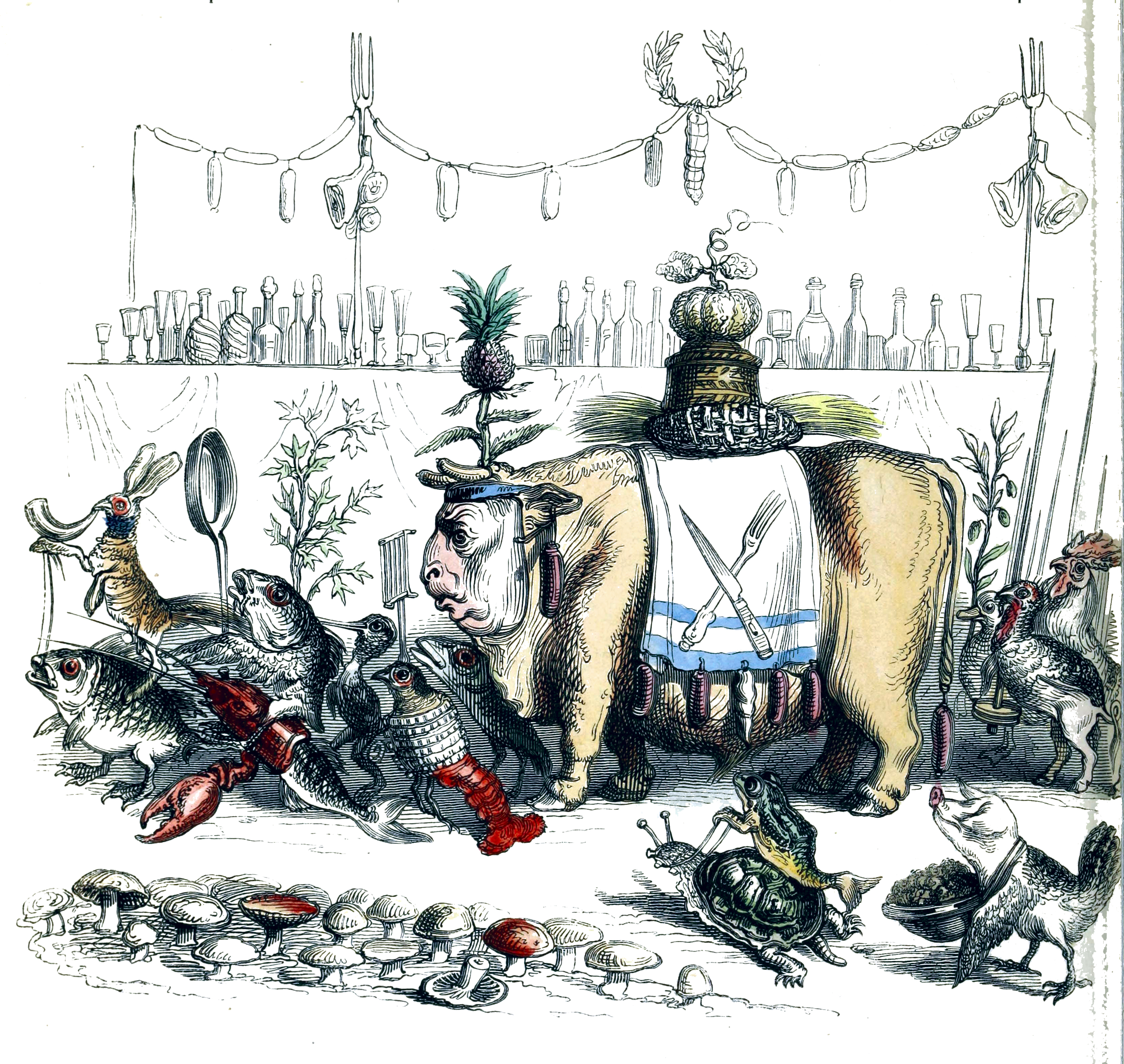
Le Bœuf Gras as seen by Grandville, 1844.

The Fat Ox parade, a tradition with deep historical roots in Paris, faced significant challenges in the years leading up to 1848. This period was marked by a series of revolutions that led to the cancellation of the parade in 1848. The authorities in Paris initially opposed the reorganization of the procession. However, in 1849, the parade was held in Versailles, and in 1850, it took place in the neighboring communes of Montmartre, Batignolles, and La Chapelle. It is noteworthy that these communes would only be annexed to Paris a decade later. The following year, Lucien Arnault, known as Arnault the Elder, director of the Hippodrome, revived the Fat Ox parade in Paris after a three-year hiatus, drawing two to three hundred thousand spectators. He organized it again in 1852 but did not purchase the ox.

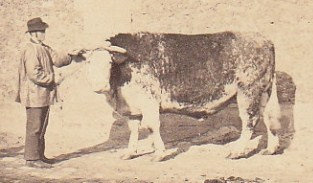
Photo of Charmant Bœuf gras, 1,200 kg, in 1864.

From 1855 to 1868, the responsibility of organizing the majority of the festivities fell to the butchers Fléchelle and Duval, who alternated in this role. Fléchelle purchased the Fat Ox on nine occasions, escorting it through the city in a procession, while Duval acquired the ox on two separate occasions. Despite the decline in popularity of the Fat Ox parade, Arnold Mortier, in his reminiscences in 1880, recalled the resplendent grandeur of the parades orchestrated by Fléchelle and Duval.

=== A long hiatus ===
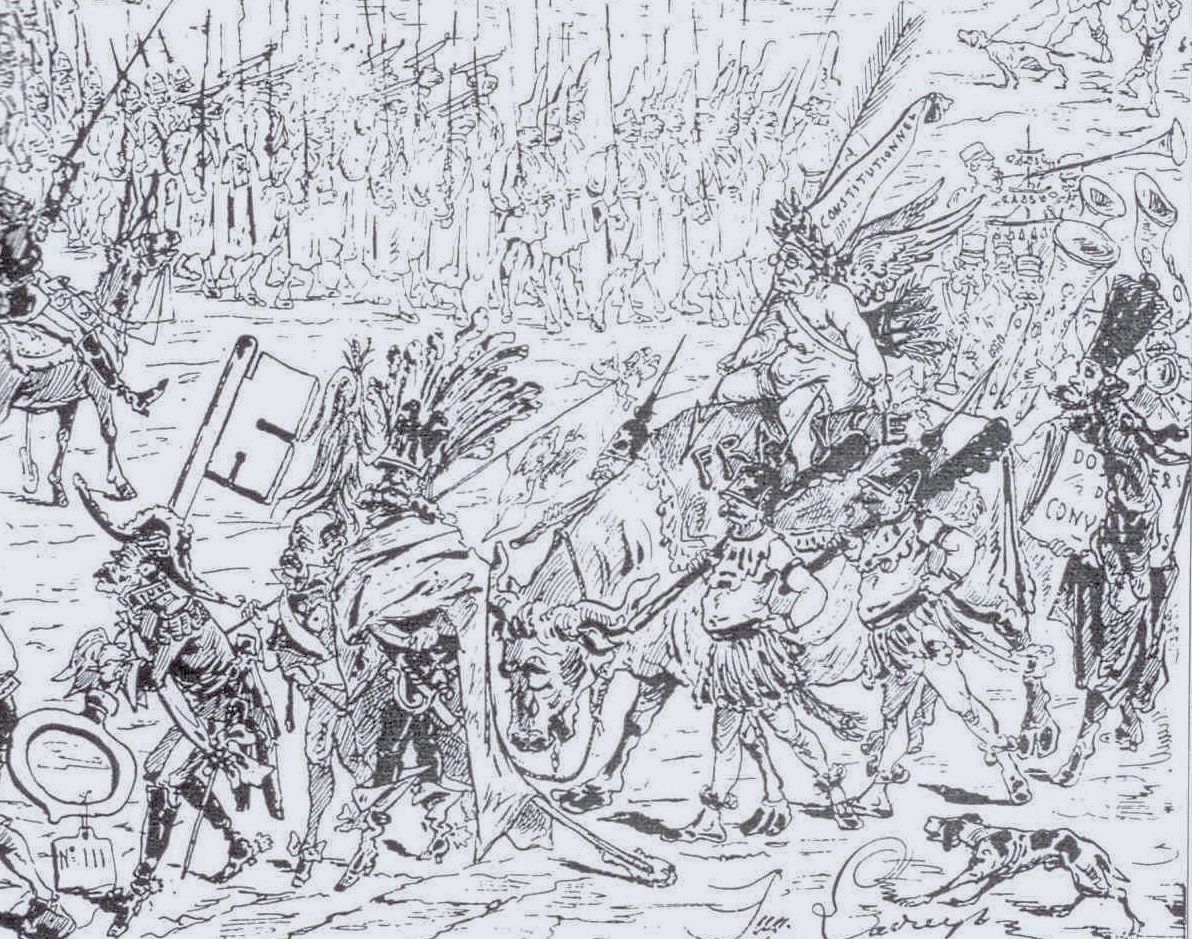
Detail from the illustration of a song broadcast in Paris on Mardi Gras 1871.

At the onset of 1871, the Franco-Prussian War reached its conclusion with the ratification of the general armistice on 15 February, a development that left France in a state of defeat and occupation. The annual Mardi Gras festivities, scheduled for 21 February, were met with preemptive prohibition by the authorities, who had taken action to quell any potential unrest. However, this did not deter a group of pranksters, who, undeterred, proceeded to stage a satirical protest. This document featured a song and a caricature of the newly elected head of state and government, Adolphe Thiers, who had assumed office just a week earlier. Thiers was depicted as Cupid, attired in a ridiculous hat and seated on the back of a tearful Fat Ox. In his hand, he held an oversized quill pen intended to sign the capitulation. The word FRANCE was written in large letters on the Fat Ox. The two traditional sacrificers escorting the animal were attired in caricatured spiked helmets, thereby identifying them as Prussians. The song's lyrics mirrored the mocking tone, commencing as follows:

Bientôt, grâce à l'armistice, Dans Paris défileront, Sir Guillaume et sa milice; Cachons vite, il n'est que temps, Nos pendules, notre argent. La royale promenade, Tombe juste au carnaval; Le défilé triomphal, Servira de mascarade; Pour nous ça remplacera Le cortège du bœuf gras.	Soon, thanks to the armistice, In Paris will march, Sir Guillaume and his militia; Let's quickly hide, while there's still time, Our clocks, our money. The royal parade Falls just in time for Carnival; The triumphant procession Will serve as a masquerade; For us, it will replace The procession of the Fat Ox.

Although Carnival resumed in 1872, the Fat Ox did not reappear.

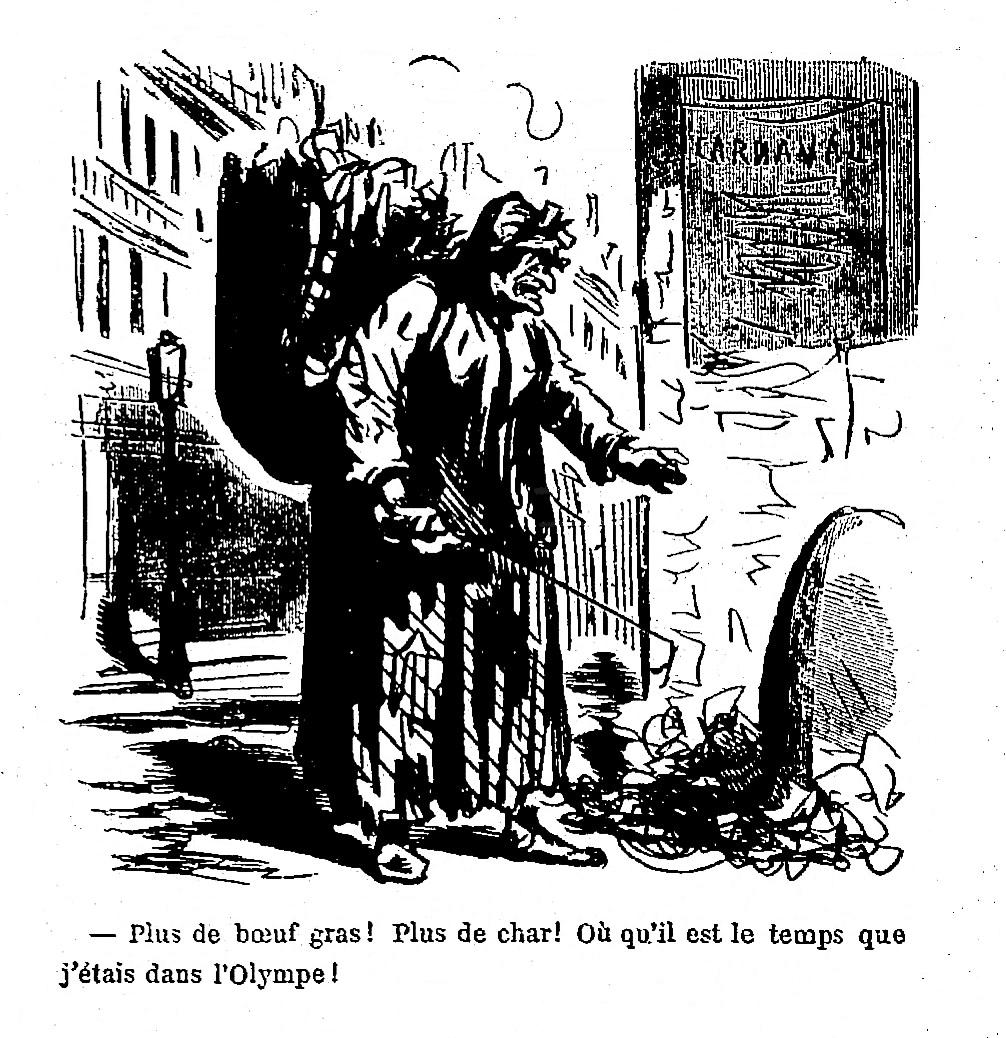
A former goddess of the Boeuf Gras procession, now a ragpicker, laments her disappearance. Cartoon by Cham, 1873.

The restoration of the parade was a topic of debate in 1873 and again in 1874, when proposals were made to raise funds for the festival. Ten years later, the Paris Butchers' Union, with support from the Food Trade Unions, appeared poised to revive the event, especially since the Paris Police Prefect was inclined to approve their request. However, the change in government following the fall of the Floquet administration in 1889, as documented by M. Champimont, prevented the Fat Ox's revival that year, thus necessitating the restart of negotiations that had been progressing with the former Minister of the Interior.

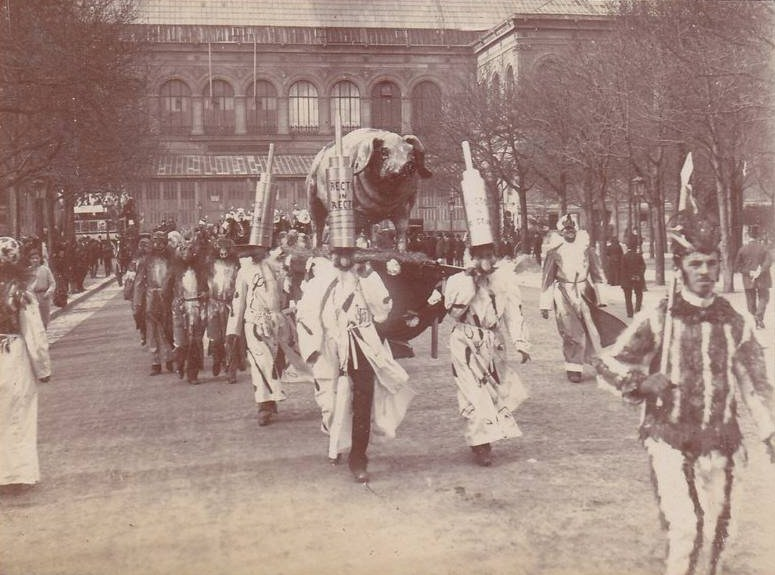
Cochon gras in papier-mâché worn by Parisian students at Mi-Carême 1894.

In 1891, there was a brief resurgence of interest in the Fat Ox, a traditional parade character from the Mardi Gras celebration in New Orleans, Louisiana. However, this attempt at reviving the tradition was met with opposition from Prime Minister and Minister of War Charles de Freycinet, who vetoed the request to use cavalry troops from the Paris garrison. These troops had been scheduled to participate in the parade dressed in costume. This decision was met with regret in several newspapers, which expressed disappointment that the Fat Ox would not be making a comeback. In the 1891 Mardi Gras parade, the Fat Ox appeared as a giant effigy. The parade included the following elements: "A vast float depicting the Fat Ox, on whose back a child dressed as Cupid offered bouquets of violets." In the subsequent years, informal Parisian parades during Mardi Gras or Mid-Lent featured the Fat Ox as a giant effigy. In 1892, the central theme of the Moulin-Rouge cavalcade featured a colossal red cardboard ox with a bobbing head, upon which Cupid—a child with blond wigs—was perched. This cavalcade continued to be featured in subsequent parades for the next two years. However, in 1894, a dancer in a pink bodysuit replaced Cupid, blowing kisses and smiles to the crowd throughout the parade. In the same year, a parade organized by Parisian students featured a young man dressed as a maiden accompanied by a diminutive "mayor" who performed mock marriages. Among the entourage was a Fat Ox in the form of a large artificial pig.

=== Revival of the procession ===
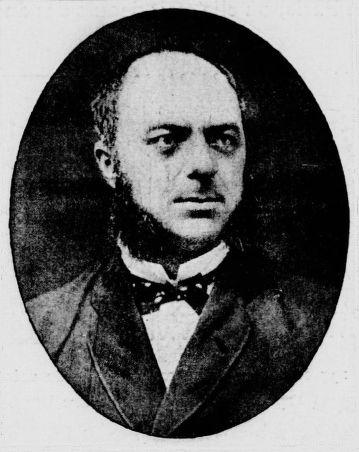
Charles Zidler, in charge of the Bœuf Gras cavalcades in 1896 and 1897.

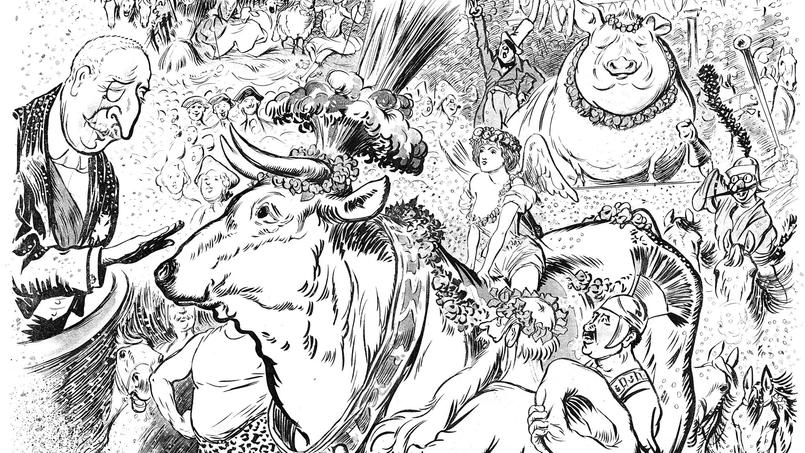
Le Bœuf Gras 1896 greeted by Félix Faure at the Élysée Palace, detail from a drawing by Caran d'Ache

By 1895, Parisians had eagerly awaited the return of the Fat Ox for twenty-five years. However, financial issues remained the primary obstacle to its return. Its absence was deeply felt:

You cannot convince many honest folk that the absence of the Fat Ox hasn't caused the decline of Carnival. Every year, at Mardi Gras, sighs of regret escape many chests, mourning the disappearance of this ancient custom. Some Parisians are so loyal to the tradition that they still come to the boulevards during the three days of festivities, (Note: Dimanche gras, lundi gras, mardi gras.) certain they will see the Fat Ox. This results in cruel disappointment.

The situation seemed to improve, however. On 25 March 1895—four days after a lively and successful Mid-Lent Thursday— M. Caplain submitted a proposal to the Paris Council in favor of bringing back the Fat Ox. He was joined by Caumeau, and together they issued a report on 28 November 1895, explaining that the Butchers' Union planned to organize the Fat Ox Parade through funds raised via a lottery worth 500,000 francs. They sought authorization from the Minister of the Interior, and on 6 December, the Council supported the project. "The Municipal Council, dreaming of calmer recreations for us, is reportedly preparing a prodigious Fat Ox. Let us give thanks."

In 1896, preparations for the Fat Ox Festival unfolded on a grand scale. A Fat Ox Festival Committee was formed, led by Charles Zidler, a former butcher, son of a butcher, and entertainment organizer. A subscription campaign was launched, and the Parisian authorities contributed 25,000 francs toward the estimated 100,000-franc cost of the parade. On Sunday, 16 February 1896, at 11 am, the commencement of the parade was marked by a cannon blast. The ox, a specimen of the Norman breed, embarked from the Palais de l'Industrie on the Champs-Élysées. Over the subsequent two days, two additional animals were exhibited: a Limousin ox on Monday and a Charolais ox on Tuesday. It is noteworthy that neither of these animals appear to have been assigned a name. The event garnered widespread enthusiasm. However, during this period, authorities were actively discouraging the practice of advertising, as evidenced by the Paris Police Prefecture's General instructions for municipal police, which included directives such as "Do not allow advertising floats to join the parade."

In response to the Fat Ox Parade, which took place on Mid-Lent Thursday, 12 March 1896, Parisian students organized a procession through the Latin Quarter. The students carried a papier-mâché ox, which they had named Minosdaure. This ox served as a mount for a Prince Carnival, who was dressed as winged Cupid. Surrounding the float were young "female students" dressed as gold mines. These students had costumes similar to those worn in year-end revues. They handed out food vouchers to the public.

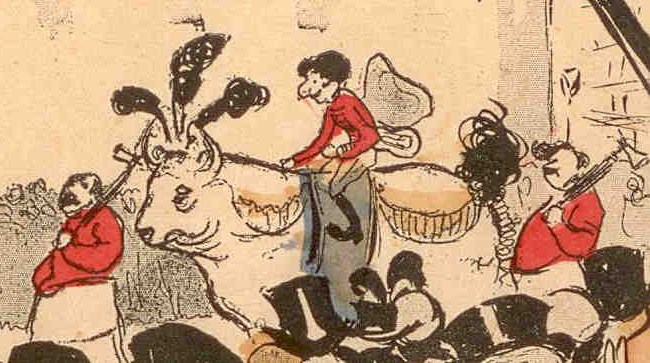
Detail of the Ordre et Marche du Bœuf Gras program from 1897.

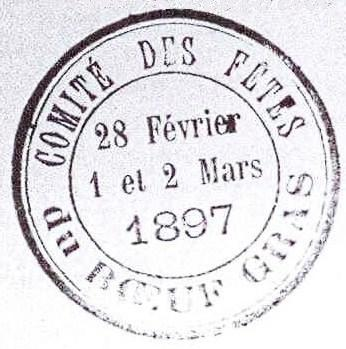
Postmark of the Comité des Fêtes du Bœuf Gras 1897.

Despite the deficit recorded for the 1896 parade, the procession was organized again on 28 February 1 March, and 2 March 1897. It was filmed by the Lumière brothers' teams and Georges Méliès. Once again, it was a success. The Quebec newspaper La Patrie reported: "The crowd along the parade route for the Fat Ox yesterday numbered six hundred thousand people."

In 1896 and 1897, in response to the ostentatious Fat Ox Parade, the artistic community of Montmartre organized a competing carnival procession known as the Promenade de la Vache Enragée (Starving Cow Parade), also referred to as Vachalcade, a term derived from the French phrase "vache" (cow) and "cavalcade" (carnival). The organizers of this event were confronted with financial constraints, which ultimately led to its discontinuation.

On 10 November 1897, Charles Zidler, the organizer of the 1896 and 1897 Fat Ox parades, passed away. The loss of this former butcher and key organizer of the traditional butchers' festival in Paris may have led to a diminution in the event's resilience, despite the financial challenges it faced.

=== An irregular organization ===
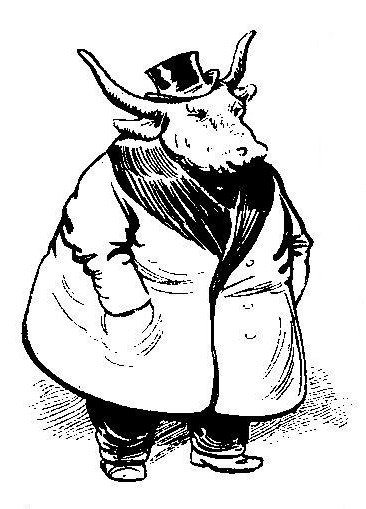
Le Bœuf Gras caricatured by Draner in 1898.

In 1898, the Paris authorities allocated a budget of 25,000 francs for the organization of the Bœuf Gras parade, offering a monetary incentive to any individual willing to assume responsibility for its coordination. A strategic plan was formulated, entailing the leadership of a Bœuf Gras parade by the Duke of Beaufort as a constituent element of the King of Les Halles' procession. However, the Bœuf Gras Committee determined that the financial deficit was too substantial to justify the undertaking of the festival. During the Mid-Lent festivities on 17 March, Parisian students employed humor to highlight the apparent disappearance of the Bœuf Gras. The Petit Journal documented this development, noting: "The first float appears immediately: The End of the Bœuf Gras. The unfortunate beast has been thrown alive into a massive pot simmering on a gigantic stove. A massive, fantastical cardboard Carnival, wearing a student's beret, holds a skimmer and gazes at the stewpot with greedy eyes." Upon the parade's arrival at Place du Panthéon, La Croix reported that the cardboard animal was removed from the pot, doused in petroleum, and burned. Surrounding it, an enormous circle danced, and Sarcey, (Note: "Sarcey" here refers to a costumed person depicting Sarcey, a famous figure known, in particular, for his corpulence, which was the subject of mockery by Parisian students.) too heavy to join, patted his belly in rhythm.

Many municipal councilors expressed the opinion that traditional carnival celebrations had become obsolete. They emphasized the moral education of Parisians through performances combining science and art with high-concept themes. This shift in perspective is evidenced by the significant reduction in subsidies allocated to the Mid-Lent and Bœuf Gras Committees, from a total of 65,000 francs in the previous year to a mere 12,000 francs on 29 December 1898. In contrast, a substantial budget of 65,000 francs was allocated to a "grand historical procession of guilds during the time of Étienne Marcel," scheduled to take place on 17–18 June 1899. (Note: Budget imprimé de la ville de Paris [Printed budget of the city of Paris] kept at the Bibliothèque administrative de la ville de Paris.)

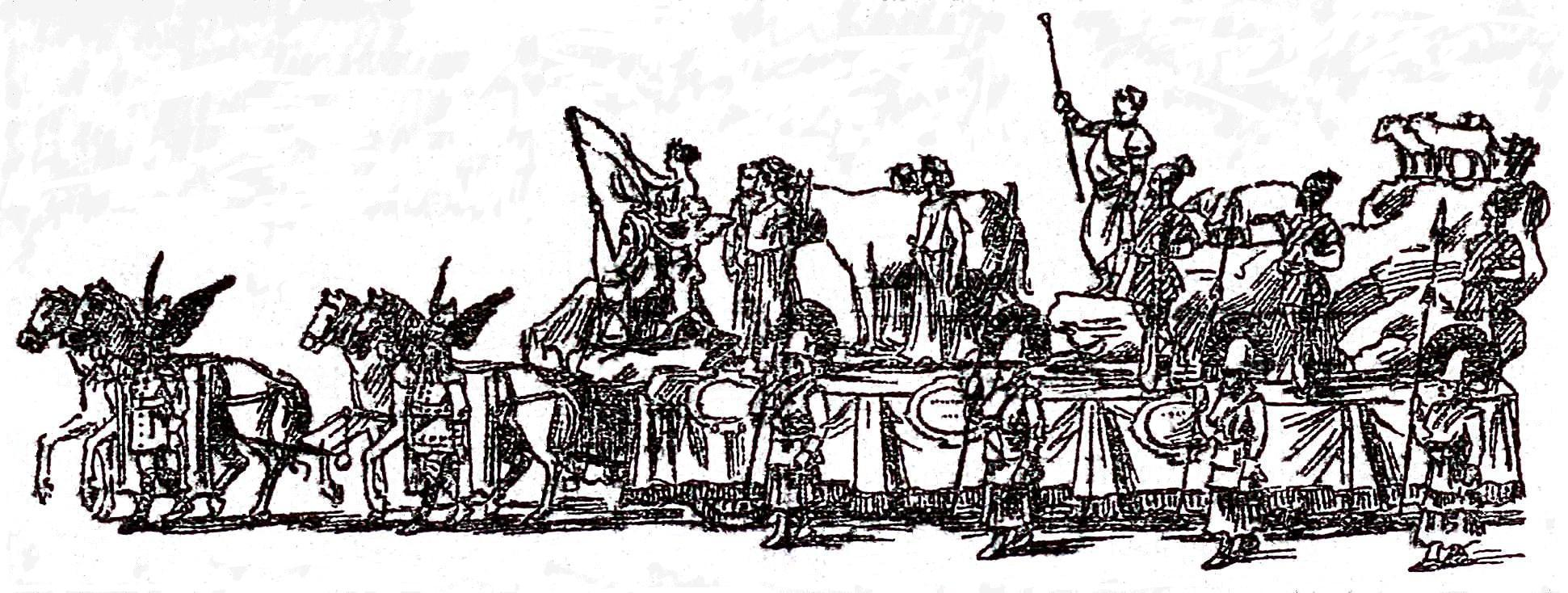
Char du Bœuf Gras de la Fête de l'Alimentation 1900.

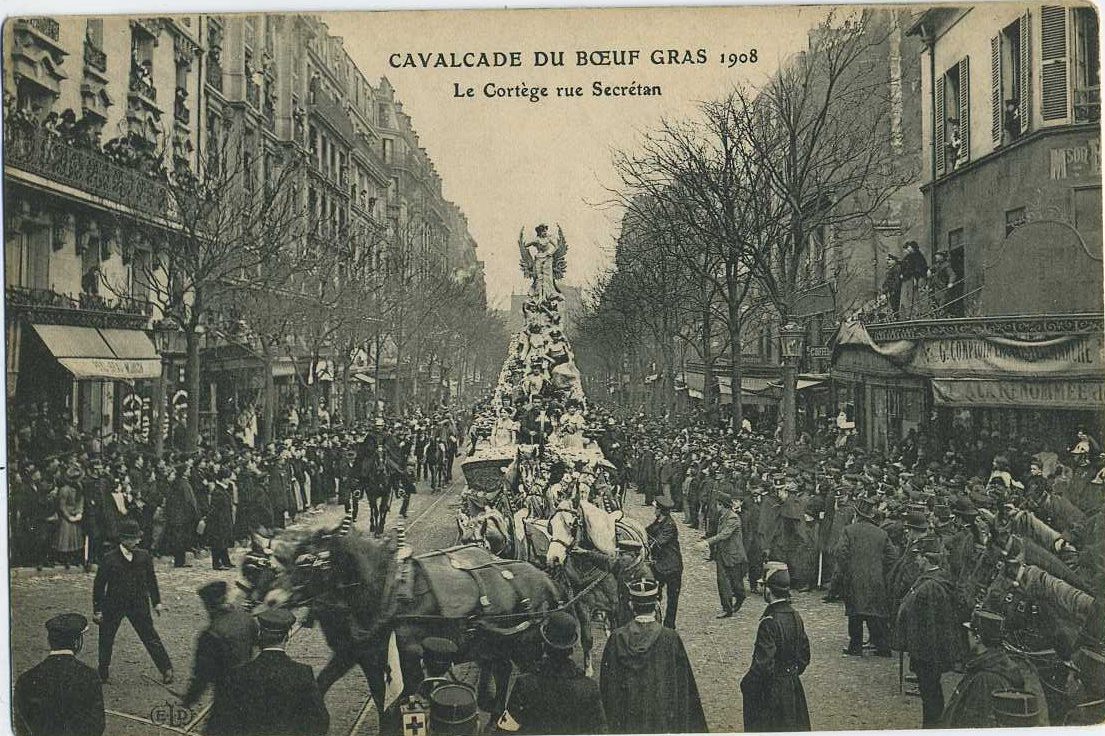
The Cavalcade du Bœuf Gras passes along Avenue Secrétan on 26 April 1908.

In the early 20th century, the Bœuf Gras parade emerged as a prominent feature of the Food Festival held in the La Villette district, including a procession on 25 February. (Note: The official program for the festival, consulted at the Iconothèque du Musée des arts et traditions populaires in Paris, is entitled: Fête de l'Alimentation et du Bœuf gras.) However, by the close of the year, the city council decided to eliminate the annual allocation of 25,000 francs for the Bœuf Gras celebration, citing its sporadic occurrence. This decision was accompanied by the stipulation that the possibility of reconsideration would be evaluated if a dedicated committee were to be established. In February 1901, a group of merchants and residents from the 19th arrondissement planned a parade with 16 symbolic floats. However, due to a lack of municipal funding, the event was canceled.

On the morning of Mid-Lent Thursday, 6 March 1902, the Marché Lenoir store organized a parade through the streets of the 19th arrondissement. The procession featured a float carrying a bœuf gras adorned with flowers and accompanied by beautiful women, as well as an allegorical float depicting Pierrot and Columbine riding a crescent moon, escorted by numerous carriages. A subsequent parade, organized with a budget of 5,000 francs—a sum derived from the remaining funds of the 1900 Bœuf Gras festival and substantial contributions from merchants and residents of the 19th and 10th arrondissements, following the rejection of a municipal subsidy request—occurred ten days later in the La Villette district. Initially, two bœufs gras were planned to participate in the parade. However, one of the bovine subjects resisted being loaded onto its float, and could not be taken along. Le Petit Parisien reported the event as a success, though it was confined to a small part of Paris. The festivities included musicians and 500 costumed participants dressed as heralds, nobles, kitchen boys, reapers, and harvesters. The newspaper wrote: "Never has a plump ox exhibited for the public's amusement aroused such delighted curiosity, and laughter erupted in bursts as the floats passed by, where picturesque allegories proclaimed the glory of wine and the Rabelaisian triumph of feasting." The bœuf gras was the grand prize in a raffle organized by the festival committee. The parade also included an animated float featuring a giant Gargantua devouring food, seemingly inspired by a similar float that had accompanied the Bœuf Gras in 1866. (Note: See the char de l'Alimentation 1902, animated with Gargantua, on the Commons.) At the end of the festival, the organizers found themselves in a serious financial deficit. They appealed to Paris's municipal finances for assistance. On 20 June, the City Council approved an exceptional grant of 4,400 francs to help cover the deficit and avoid legal action against the merchants involved, whom they deemed undeserving of such consequences.

Three floats from the 1902 Bœuf Gras Cavalcade in Paris

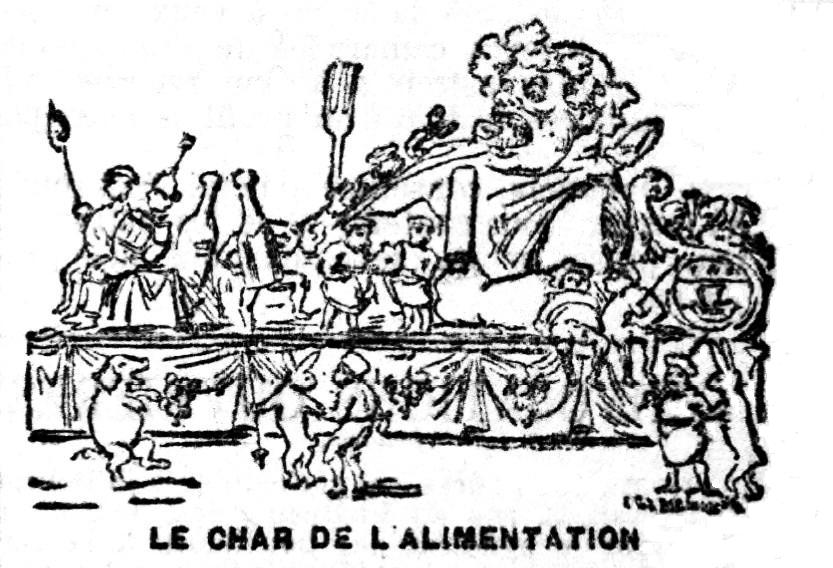
Char de l'Alimentation

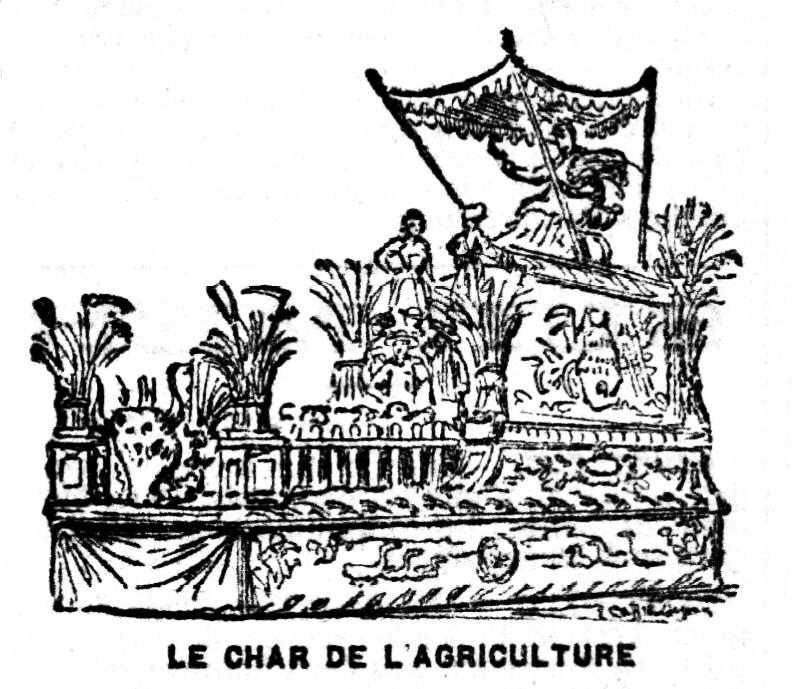
Chariot of Agriculture

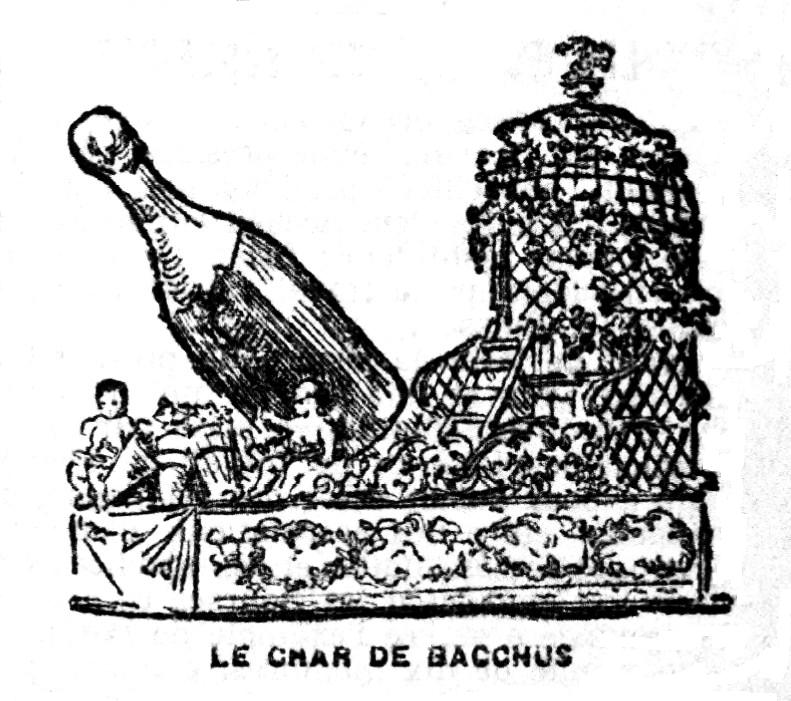
Bacchus float

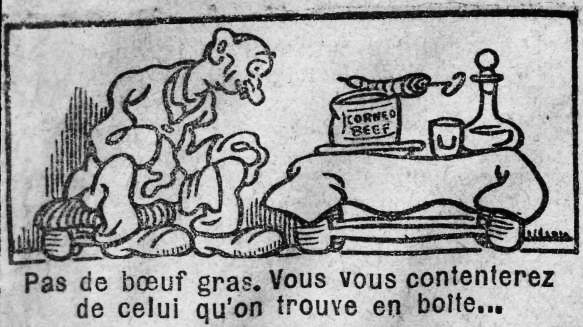
Cartoon by L. Kern, 17 February 1920.

From 1903 to 1908, and again in 1913 and 1914, a series of Bœuf Gras parades were meticulously organized, predominantly in the 19th arrondissement. The procession on 9 April 1905, was particularly notable, with 1,800 participants and musicians, as well as 400 horses, taking part in the event to commemorate the centenary of the festival's restoration in 1805, following its suspension from 1790 to 1804. The event featured an open-air concert performed by seven hundred musicians. In 1907, no fewer than three parades were held: on 10 February, the Bœuf Gras of the Left Bank, also referred to as that of the Vaugirard slaughterhouses, took place; four days later, another parade was held on the Right. Bank, also known as that of the La Villette slaughterhouses; and on 7 March, in the procession for Mid-Lent Thursday, a large papier-mâché Bœuf Gras, humorously described as "not having cost much to fatten," was featured. No parade was organized in 1909, nor, it seems, in 1910, despite a subsidy having been allocated. In 1913, the parade occurred during an Agricultural Festival following the conclusion of the General Agricultural Competition. The subsequent year, a large papier-mâché Bœuf Gras marched during the Mid-Lent festival in Paris. However, World War I interrupted the festivities.

The Bœuf Gras first appeared on 27 March 1924, and was characterized by a parade that included a heifer, four prize-winning bulls from the Agricultural Competition, and fattened sheep (Jones, 1998). In 1926, during the student parade on Mardi Gras, 16 February, organized by the Latin Quarter festival committee, a lean bull was paraded as a symbol of protest against the excessive increase in university fees and the high cost of living. The Bœuf Gras made its final appearance of the 20th century on 19 March 1936.

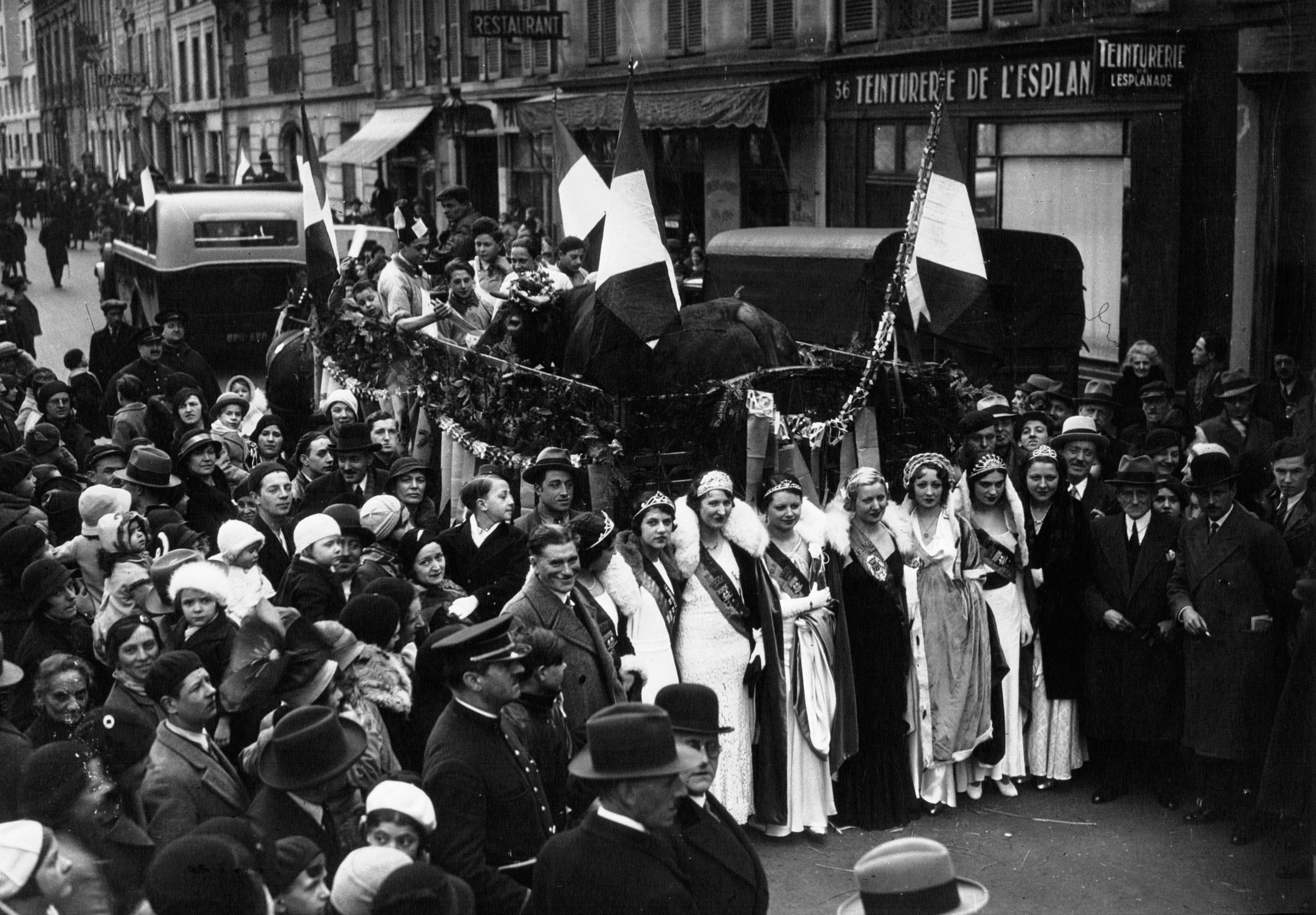
The Mi-Carême 1934 Bœuf Gras parades on a float in rue Saint-Dominique.

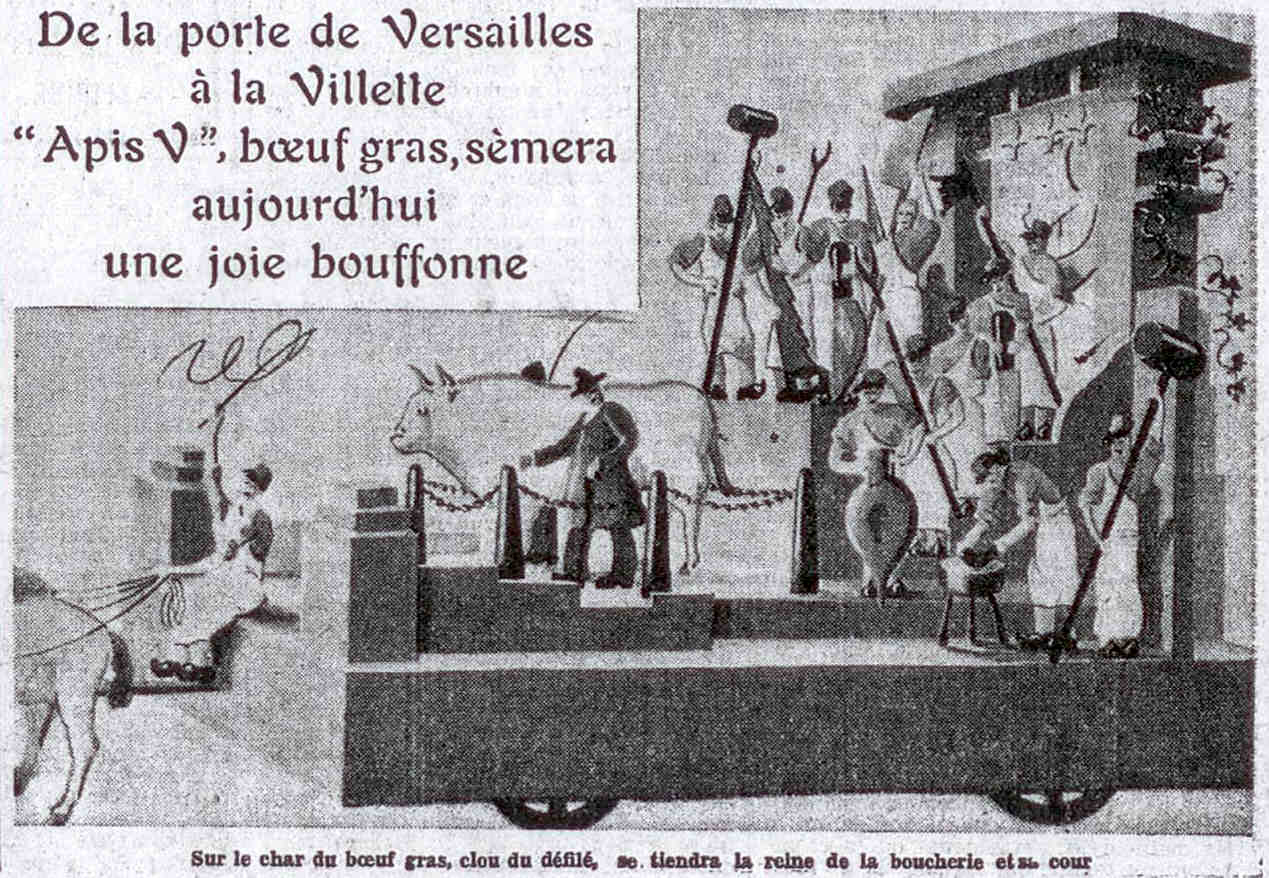
Drawing of the Bœuf Gras 1936 float.

=== A difficult return ===
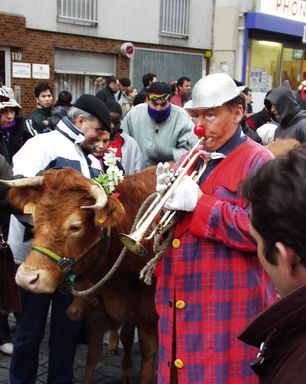
Pimprenelle and Pat the Clown lead the 2004 Paris Carnival.

For fifteen years, the tradition of Bœuf Gras parades was nonexistent. However, in May 1951, the Paris Bi-millennium Committee revived this tradition in the slaughterhouse district of La Villette. The following year, on 20 April 1952, the 19th arrondissement festival committee revived the tradition, accompanied by a hundred students from the School of Butchery. These students were attired in work attire and held up the corporation's coats of arms aloft. For the subsequent fifty years, the festival remained dormant. The resurgence of the Paris Carnival was initiated by Basile Pachkoff and Catherine Poulain, who established the APCP (Association for the Revival of the Paris Carnival) before reemerging in September 1998 with the support of Alain Riou. The inaugural "Bœuf Gras" featured an 800-kilogram cow named Impatiente-Saint-Fargeau or Pimprenelle, rather than a bull. This bovine was not slaughtered after the festival but rather allowed to return to its pastures in Saint-Priest-les-Fougères. This tradition continued until 2014, with four cows participating in the event, until its final recorded appearance in the context of the Paris Carnival.

== Choice of the animal and its name ==
=== Designation of the bulls ===
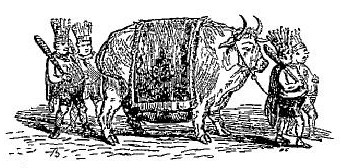
Le Bœuf Gras as seen by Bertall in 1845–1846. Caption for drawing: “Le bœuf gras. Student from the Cornet institution.” (Note: Caricature by Bertall: the Bœuf Gras of 1853 is named Père Tom rather than Uncle Tom in honor of the hero of La Case de l'oncle Tom, and justifies its name by adopting the translator of the book, Émile de Labédollière. Thus, having become a father by adoption, it legitimizes its title.)

In the 18th and 19th centuries, the Bœuf Gras parades featured several consistent elements, including the selection of particularly corpulent animals. The term "gras" (fat) was used to describe an animal with a high meat-to-fat ratio. Some breeders were selected to provide animals on multiple occasions. For instance, in 1829, Mr. Cornet, a breeder hailing from Caen, brought the Bœufs Gras from Cotentin to the market in Poissy on six occasions, including the year 1829, to be paraded through Paris. The two animals in question weighed 1,180 kilograms each. Cornet continued to provide numerous others during the 1830s.

As demonstrated in Louis-Charles Bizet's Du commerce de la boucherie et de la charcuterie de Paris et des commerces qui en dépendent, the Bœuf Gras tradition functioned as a publicity operation for the butcher purchaser and the breeder. The Bœuf Gras tradition was regarded as "a stimulant for livestock breeders, a prize for the noble work of agriculture, an honor for the one who provided the Bœuf Gras." From 1821 onward, the future Bœufs intended for the parade were selected by a group of butchers at the livestock markets near Paris. The buyers then assumed responsibility for organizing the festival, a role previously held by apprentice butchers. During the 1830s and 1840s, the butcher merchant Rolland thus monopolized the Bœuf Gras. The financial demands of the event, including the costs associated with floats, costumes, and participant compensation, were offset by a variety of sources. These included donations from the communities where the bovine was showcased, the butcher's union, material assistance from the police prefecture, and the anticipated revenue from advertising. Beginning in 1896, the selection of the bovine took place at the Palais de l'Industrie during the General Agricultural Competition. However, the destruction of the building in 1900 led to the relocation of the competition to the La Villette district.

=== Name of the animal ===
Beginning in 1845, bulls were assigned specific names that reflected contemporary events. For instance, the war in Mexico prompted the naming of a bull Mexico, while a victory by Napoleon III led to another bull being named Magenta. The nomenclature could also be inspired by popular operettas of the era, such as Rothomago and Lalla-Roukh in 1863, or musical hits like Tu-vas-me-l'payer in 1862 and L'pied qui remue in 1863, which were based on popular songs. The bull was also named after literary works of the moment, as evidenced by its naming after Balzac's novel Goriot in 1845. The following year, it was named Dagobert, after the novel Le Juif errant by Eugène Sue.The procession that followed the bull included the main characters of the novel: Dagobert riding Jovial, with Rose and Blanche, Prince Djalma, Marshal Simon, Rodin holding his open umbrella, etc. Over time, it became said that an author honored in this way had "entered the slaughterhouse." The expression "being Bœuf Gras" came to signify success, a notion that was commented on in 1847 by Théophile Gautier and Charles Monselet, the latter employing a tone of irony in his commentary.

Besides, no form of glory will have been lacking (to Alexandre Dumas). This year's Bœuf Gras has just been named Monte-Cristo, which is no small honor, you can believe it. This literary animal, which has been called Goriot and Dagobert, has now passed into the realm of prizes and is now awarded to the best feuilleton novelist. One has the Bœuf Gras, just as one has a chair at the Institute. It is the complement to any reputation, the bouquet, the apotheosis, the laurel of the Capitol. Eugène Sue and Balzac each had it in turn; M. Dumas could not remain behind for long. Prepare the triumphal float with the bloated Cupid, the plumed Hercules, and the savage brandishing his club; here comes the Orosmanes of the stall and the Almavivas of the charcuterie. It's Monte-Cristo passing by, it's the feuilleton novel being led to the slaughterhouse.

Sixty-five years later, Le Gaulois published a commentary on this practice on 27 February 1913, stating, "Thus, it was a great honor to see—butchers voted amongst themselves—the name of one of their works given to the victorious bull of the year. They called this, by extension, being Bœuf Gras: Timothée Trimm was, as were Mlle Thérésa, Émile Augier, Offenbach, and Sardou, among others."

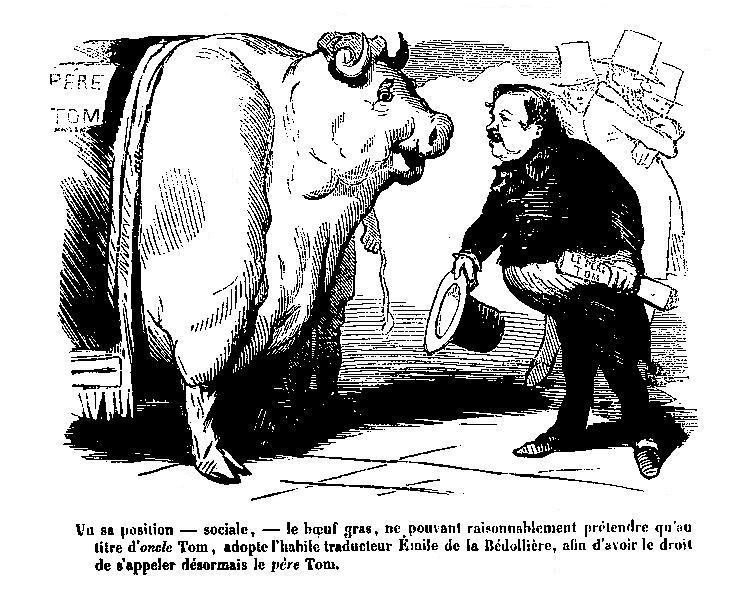
Bertall's 1853 Bœuf Gras.

In 1853, the names of the three Bœufs Gras parading were changed to characters from Harriet Beecher Stowe's novel Uncle Tom's Cabin due to its immense success. Specifically, the names Shelby and Saint-Clare were adopted, and following the translation of the novel by Émile de La Bédollière, the name Père-Tom was used instead of Uncle Tom. This change led to a linguistic controversy.

In 1867, several newspapers played along by suggesting names in advance. Some of these names were indeed given to the twelve oxen that would parade in turn during the carnival. The artist André Gill, who participated in the event, had the honor of naming one after the satirical newspaper La Lune, to which he contributed. All the animals were acquired by the Parisian butcher merchant Fléchelle for no less than 40,000 francs, marking his seventh time supplying the bœuf gras. "Never has the triumph of corpulence been observed on such weighty specimens..." stated Timothée Trimm. Their weight ranged from 1,100 to 1,500 kg. Aged 4 to 6 years, of the Cotentin breed, they had been fattened for two years and presented at the 1867 World's Fair: "These giants, whose fattening lasts at least two years, are not models of structure, as we know, but their feeder spends as much science to select and prepare them as would be required to win the honorary cup at Poissy. (Note: It is a reward from the important meat animal competition in Poissy, near Paris.) It is true that, last year, he sold his students at a pretty good price."

It has been observed that, on occasion, bœufs gras undergo a second name change subsequent to their baptism for the festival. For instance, in 1868, the four bœufs gras, initially announced under the names Gulliver, la Cagnotte, Blondin, and Rumford, subsequently paraded under the names La Nièvre, Mignon, Le Lutteur Masqué (adorned with a black taffeta wolf), and Paul Forestier.

=== The case of sarlabot ===
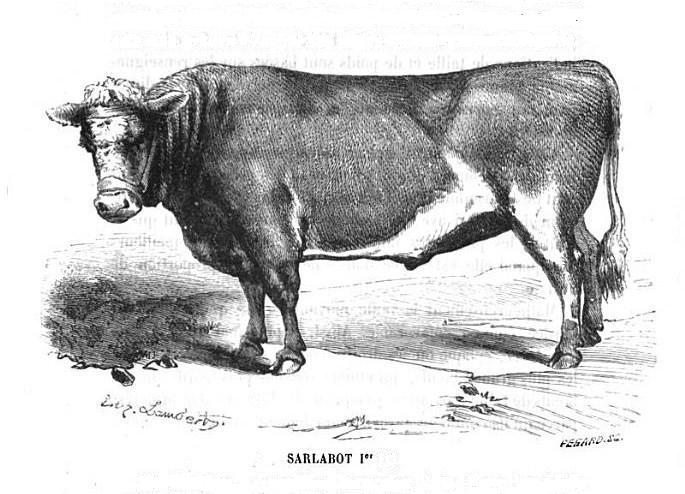
Sarlabot, Bœuf Gras from 1857, by Eugène Lambert.

In 1857, the Promenade des Bœufs Gras attracted unusual interest due to the presence of Sarlabot, an ox of a new Norman breed, called Cotentin, raised and fattened by Henry Dutrône on his estate in Sarlabot, Trousseauville-Dives in Calvados. It was a hornless ox, obtained by crossing with hornless English breeds. The Journal d'agriculture pratique published an engraved portrait of the animal, which was later used to illustrate two brochures. The dairy qualities were particularly emphasized. Sarlabot, named after the estate where it was born, was slaughtered on 19 April 1857. It was later known as Sarlabot I, with another Sarlabot of the same breed participating in the parade the following year. This one was bought after Carnival by butcher Duval, the organizer of the 1858 bœufs gras parade, whose budget reached 14,187 francs 10 centimes. Duval came into conflict with breeder Dutrône, who refused to deliver it immediately as demanded by the butcher.

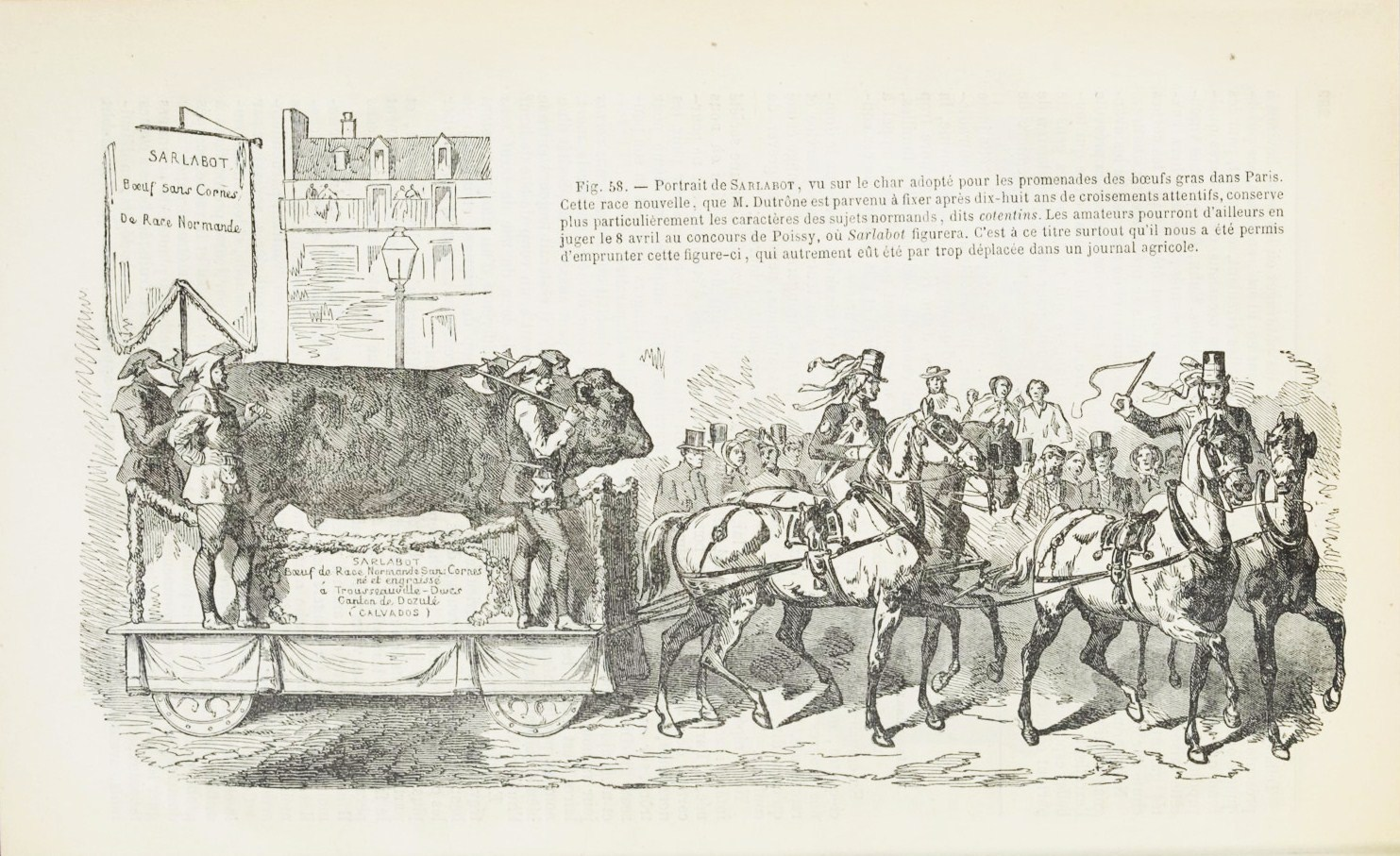
The first Bœuf Gras Sarlabot at the 1857 parade.

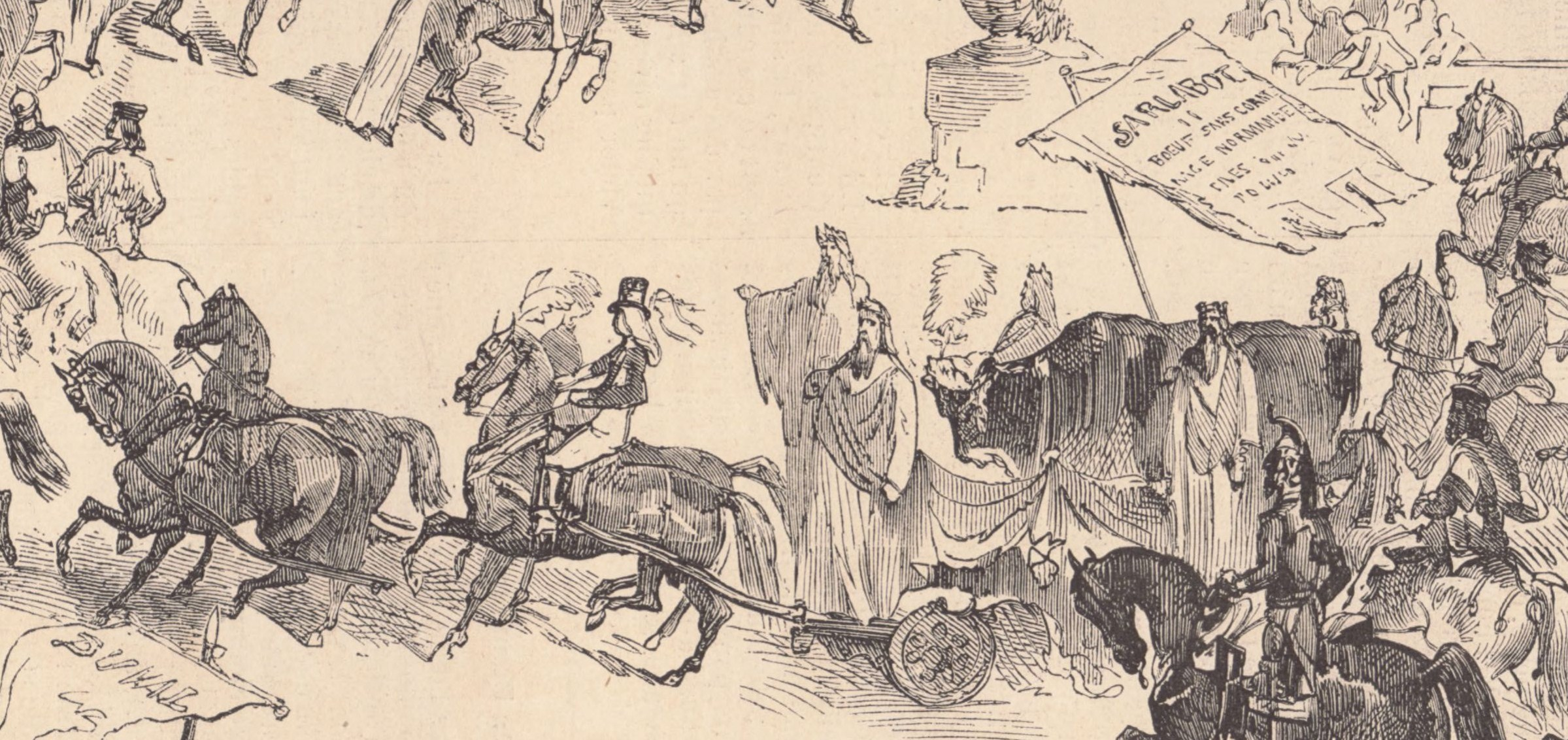
The second Bœuf Gras Sarlabot at the 1858 parade.

== The parade ==
=== Composition ===
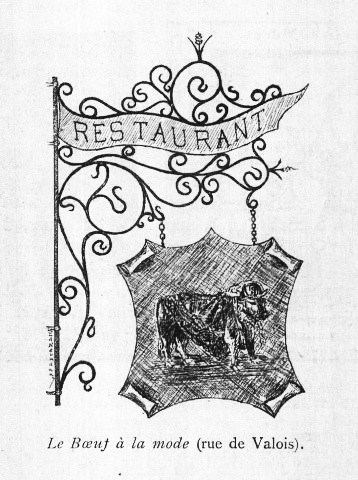
Sign for the restaurant Le Bœuf à la mode on rue de Valois in Paris, featuring a Bœuf Gras enguirlandé de roses (Directoire period).

During Carnival, a festival that was celebrated until the mid-19th century, a parade consisting of one or more animals adorned with various ornaments was held. This parade also featured a group of butchers and butcher boys disguised as savages, sacrificers, or victims, Turks, accompanied by a child playing the role of Love, often perched on the back of the animal, musicians, and occasionally horsemen. Before the parade, the oxen were led through a procession in a slaughterhouse courtyard, accompanied by the resonant beat of drums, thereby acclimating them to the auditory environment. During the event, ropes, held by butcher boys, were strategically positioned as obstacles, designed to subdue any erratic behavior exhibited by the animals.

The earliest known description of this tradition dates back to 1739. The ox was adorned with garlands of flowers and other ornaments, and it carried "a large branch of cherry laurel" instead of a crest on its head. It was also covered with a carpet that served as a saddle blanket," served as the mount for the "young King of the Festival, who, mounted on the Fat Ox, had a large blue ribbon passed over his shoulder, holding a golden scepter in one hand and a bare sword in the other." The entourage was led on the eve of Mardi Gras by an escort of fifteen butcher boys, attired in Turkish style with red corsets, white trousers, and red turbans or hats bordered with white. Two of the butcher boys guided the animal by its horns, while others played the violin, flute, and drum, and still others carried a stick.

In 1783, the animal, adorned with floral embellishments on its horns, was permitted to succumb to weakness to avert potential accidents. It was led by a group of butcher boys attired in Turkish garb and mounted on horseback, marching to the melody of wind instruments performing the composition Malbrough s'en va-t-en guerre. However, on Sunday, 10 February 1812, in the Place du Théâtre-des-Italiens, the Parisian Bœuf Gras, or bull, dropped the child it was carrying, ran off, and knocked over several people, and was only caught with great difficulty. The following year, the child dressed as Cupid was replaced by an actor portraying the god Mars. This innovation was not adopted thereafter. In 1817, an American traveler, marveling at the Parisian carnival, noted the presence of "a well-fed little Cupid" on the back of the animal. In 1821, the Journal des débats, describing the arrival of the Bœuf Gras parade at the Tuileries Palace, noted that "the child who is usually mounted on the ox was carried by a man. The colossal size of the animal rendered its gait unstable, and the child would have been at risk of falling from it." However, according to a 1903 newspaper article, the 1821 Bœuf Gras had eliminated the palanquin carrying the child representing Love for two consecutive days. From that point, it was decided that the ox would no longer serve as a mount for anyone, and the son of Venus later took his place in a float. Edmond Auguste Texier hypothesizes that in bygone eras, the ox was believed to bear a child adorned not with the image of Love, but rather with that of Horus or Mithras.

In February 1825, a diverse group of individuals, including four savages, three sacrificers, three Turks, twenty-five musicians and trumpet players, one Love, a Father of Love, Mercury, and Mars, were present to present Love on a float led by Time, accompanied by goddesses of Abundance and Peace, four Romans (two of whom held attributes of Commerce), three heralds, two runners, five knights, and an elephant driver to guide the ox.

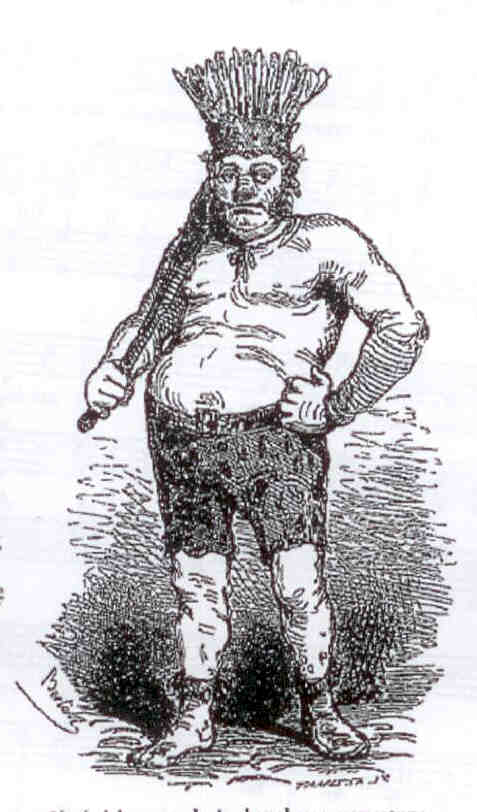
A sacrificer escorting the Boeuf Gras, by Bertall circa 1845.

Non-allegorical, mythological, or historically unimportant characters were gradually incorporated into the procession. By the end of February 1843, the traditional gods and goddesses of the Seasons, mounted on a crimson-velvet float with golden fringes and drawn by four richly harnessed horses, were joined by Folly, mounted municipal guards, and the band of Musicians of the 59th Line. The bœuf gras, adorned with golden horns and a head crowned with an immense laurel wreath and tricolored ribbon garlands, was led by four Roman sacrificers. The remainder of the parade comprised effigies of Francis I, Henry III, Louis XIII, Louis XIV, and Louis XV.

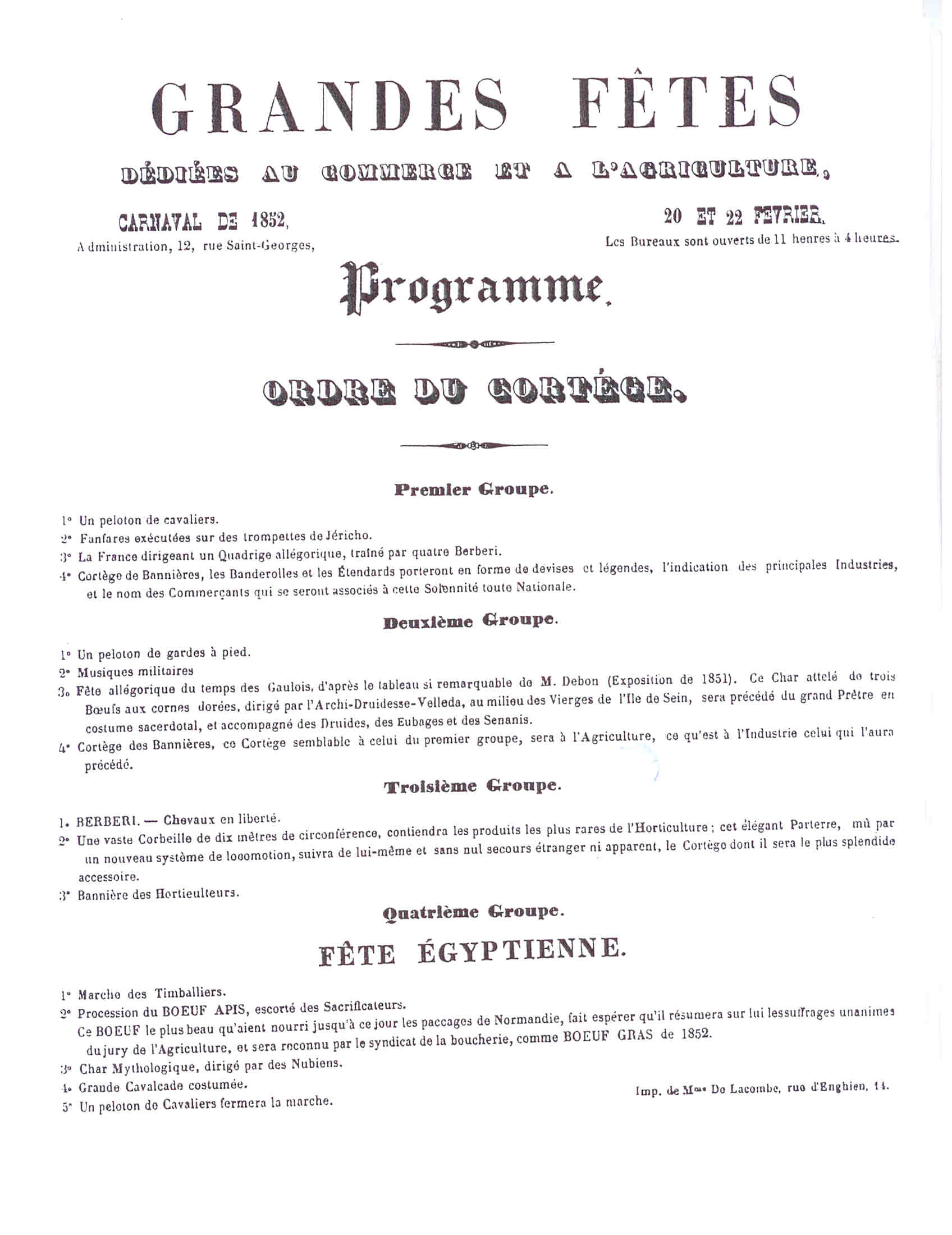
Bœuf Gras 1852 program.

According to Le Constitutionnel, the parade underwent significant changes in 1850. The classic savages, lictors, executioners, and traditional Love were no longer present. Instead, archers from the 13th century, heralds from Charles VI, musketeers from Louis XIII, Montenegrins on horseback, and Empire hussars with completely renewed costumes appeared in the parade. The following year, upon its return to Paris, the Norman Bœuf Gras Liberté, adorned with a golden embroidered cover trimmed with gold and flowers, is preceded by a detachment of cavalry from the Republican Guard and a company of drummers dressed as janissaries. It is surrounded by the four traditional savages adorned with colorful feathers and ferocious animal skins. A delegation of Norman cattle breeders follows, along with a float carrying five women representing Ceres and the four seasons, knights "in the medieval style," and cavalry from the Republican Guard bringing up the rear. The costumes were chosen by a council that included Gérard de Nerval.

In 1829, two oxen were paraded, but beginning in 1853, the practice of parading multiple animals became commonplace. In 1861, a novel element was introduced to the Bœuf Gras procession: a fat sheep, pulled in a small cart by a donkey dressed in blue, was surrounded by cherubs.

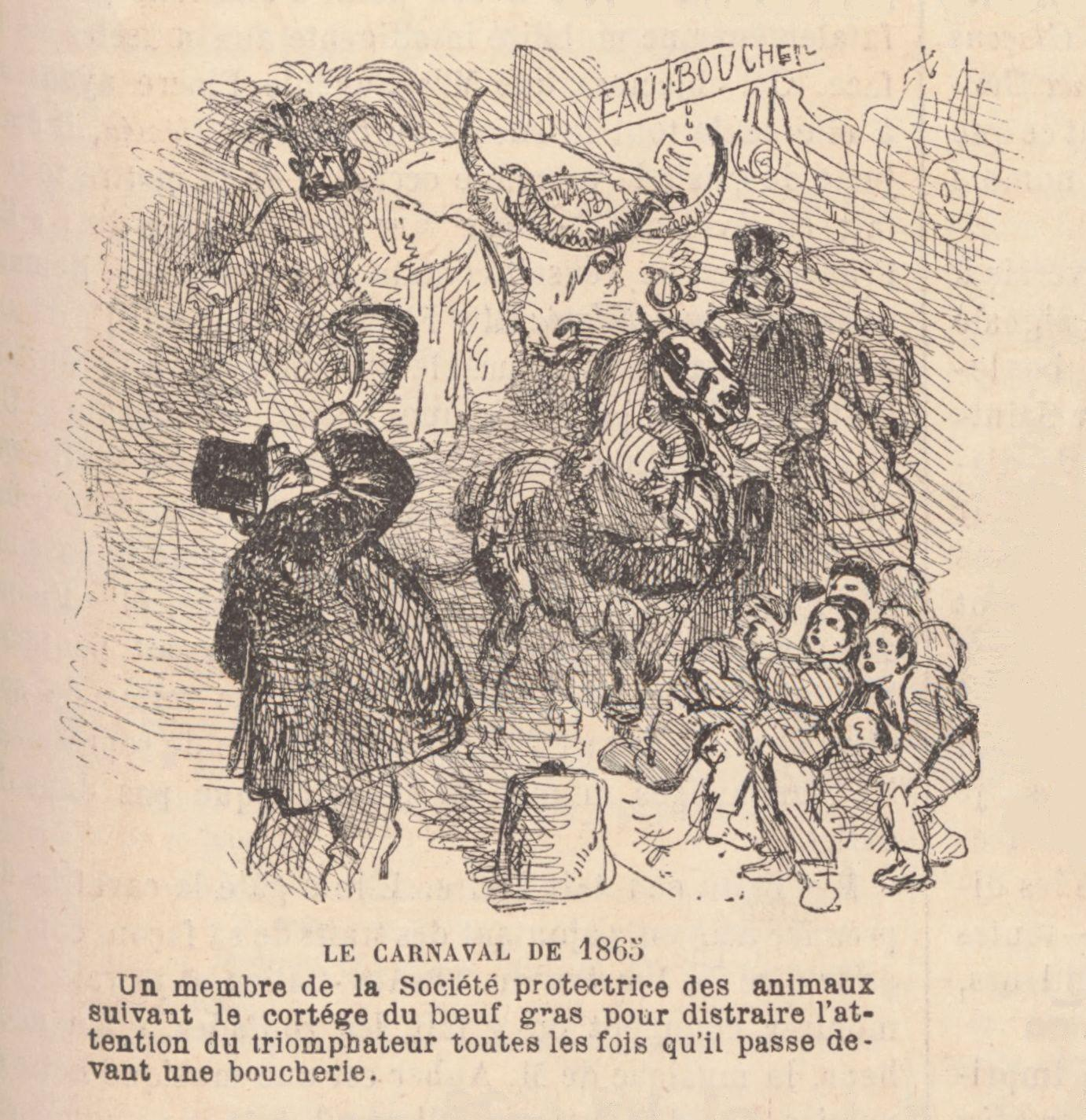
The Boeuf Gras of 1865, cartoon by Edmond Morin and Zed.

Beginning in 1855, there was a marked increase in the number of floats, and a diversification of themes. By the end of February 1865, Duval, a former butcher who had become a restaurateur, had organized a grand parade. This parade featured no fewer than eight Bœufs Gras, purchased from breeder Mesnage. This was an increase from the previous maximum of six in a single edition. On the first day of the parade, four of the floats were featured. The procession commenced "as usual," with four trumpets from the Paris Guard leading the way. They were followed by two heiduques with long staffs topped with large golden apples, a drum major, drummers, and musicians dressed in Louis XV-style costumes, light blue with silver trim. Following them came halberdiers, light cavalry, Louis XV-style dragoons, and musketeers. The first float was led by the Bœuf Ba-ta-clan, accompanied by Chinese soldiers and flanked by Roman and Gallic executioners. The second float featured trees and foliage with shepherds, possibly representing Estelle and Némorin or a subject in the style of Florian. The third float carried the Bœuf Capitaine Henriot, and the fourth featured numerous sheep grazing on a painted rock. The fifth float showcased the Cotentine breed ox Maître Guérin, touted as "the finest specimen," with a recorded weight of 1,303 kilograms. The sixth float was the Olympian float led by Time, bearing Love under a purple and gold canopy. The second-to-last float was an allegory of Agriculture, and the final float carried the Bœuf Vieux Garçon. The floats of breeder Mesnage and buyer Duval, accompanied by mounted musicians and a cavalry unit from the Paris Guard, formed the rear guard. A substantial number of mounted guards were deployed to manage the crowd.

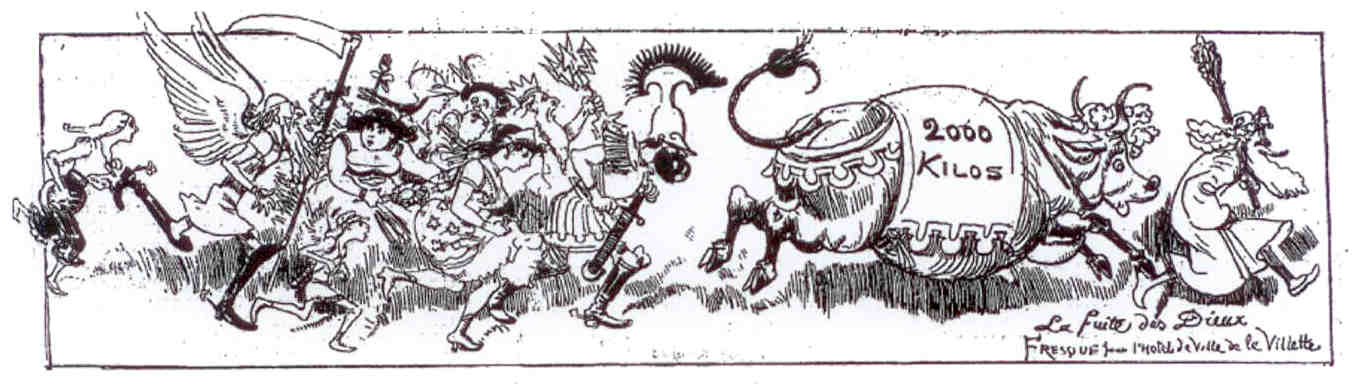
"La fuite des Dieux, Fresco for the Hôtel de Ville de la Villette, by Albert Robida, 1885.

The following year marked one of the parade's most significant popular successes, as reported by a New Zealand newspaper. The Boys Butchers were attired in the guise of druids, an allegorical float shaped like a large ship represented the city of Paris, and finally, Gargantua, a colossal figure, continually devoured various culinary offerings provided by a group of diminutive boys attired as cooks. The Bœuf Gras procession traversed the city streets of Paris on Sunday, Monday, and Tuesday, making its way to the residences of high-ranking officials. On Monday, in accordance with tradition, the Bœuf Gras procession paid homage to the emperor at the Tuileries. The fate of the poor beast, doomed, like ancient gladiators, to perish, is believed to have been saluted by Napoleon in his own manner, as the ancient Caesar is said to have done, with the words, "Ave, Caesar, moriturus te salutat, after which it continued its triumphal march. The Bœuf Gras this year was a magnificent animal, and weighed 1,360 kilogrammes." (Note: Complete text: The garçons bouchers (butcher boys) were dressed as Druids. An allegorical car, in the form of a large ship, represented the city of Paris and lastly, there was Gargantua, a monstrous giant, who swallowed unceasingly all kinds of food, which were supplied him by a band of small boys dressed as cooks. The procession of the bœuf gras paraded the streets of Paris on Sunday, Monday and Tuesday, and visited the residences of the high official personages. On Monday, as is the custom, the procession of the Boeuf Gras visited the Tuileries to pay homage to the Emperor. The poor beast, doomed, like the ancient gladiators, to die, may be said in its language to have hailed Napoleon, as Caesar of old, with the words, Ave, Caesar, moriturus te salutat, after which it continued its triumphal march. The Bœuf Gras this year was a magnificent animal, and weighed 1,360 kilogrammes.) A fat pig, carried on a float, was also part of the procession.

By the early 20th century, the Bœuf Gras parade had evolved into a component of a broader array of carnival festivities. In 1907, the parade incorporated the Bœuf Gras procession with thematic floats representing each of Paris's arrondissements, as well as a procession of the Queen of Queens of Paris. Parisian students were occasionally part of the procession, as evidenced in 1913 and 1924. In 1914, the Bœuf Gras procession, featuring a cardboard representation of an executioner on a float, participated in a grand parade that included numerous floats, all centered around the theme of "Festivals and Carnivals Through the Ages." The event also featured the newly elected queens, who were received at City Hall and the Élysée Palace.

=== The route ===
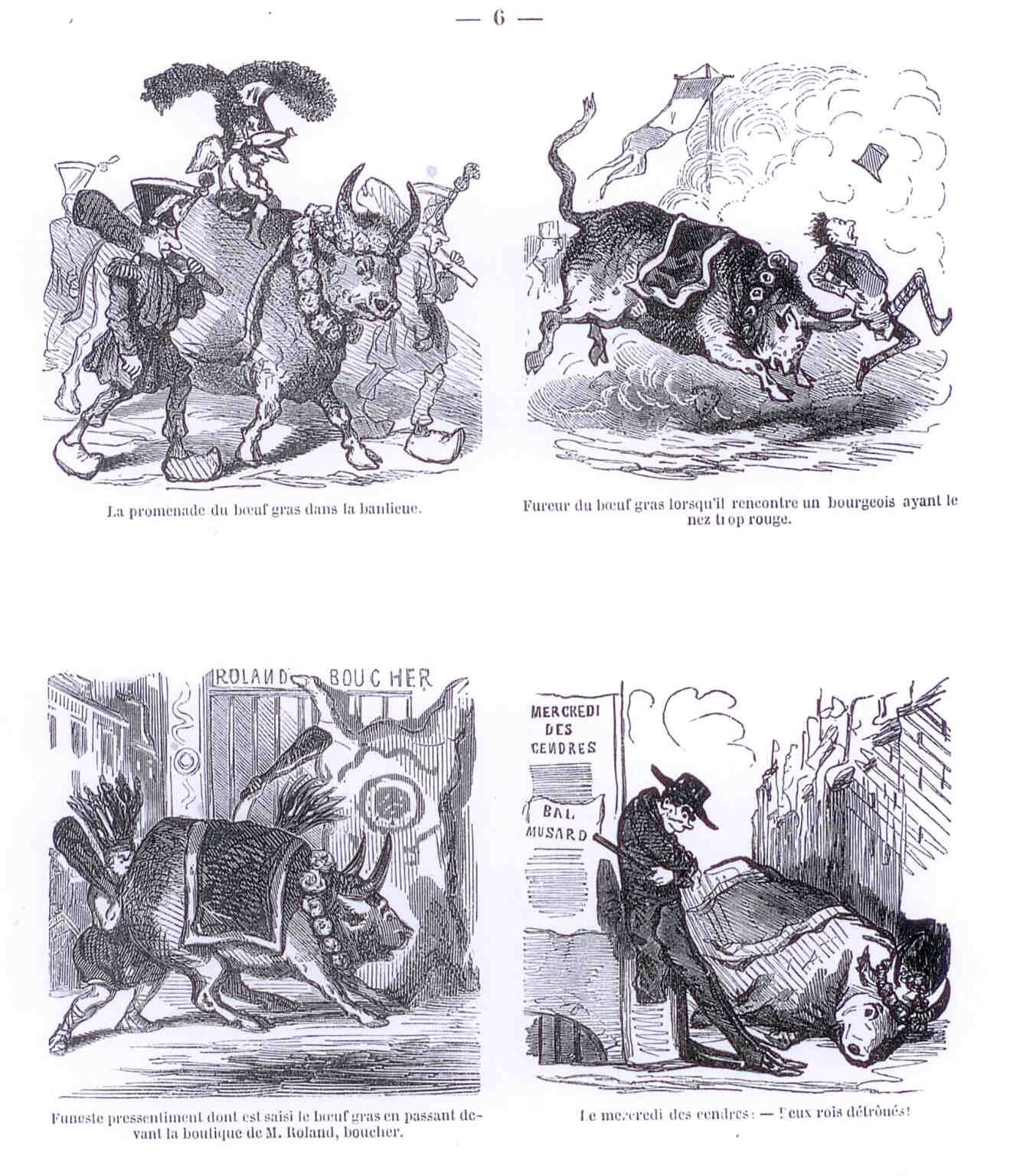
Cartoons by Cham illustrating the Promenade du Boeuf Gras, circa 1850. (Note: In the caricature at the bottom right, the character standing next to the Bœuf Gras slaughtered at the end of jours gras is Philippe Musard.)

The route of the parade, which traverses the streets of Paris, is subject to frequent alterations. However, it tends to make periodic stops in the vicinity of buildings associated with authority: the residence or seat of the French head of state, ministers, ambassadors, and the prefect. In 1739, the procession traversed various neighborhoods, including the first floor of the palace where the Parliament of Paris convened. In 1806, for instance, the Bœuf Gras stopped in front of the Tuileries Palace to be greeted by Empress Joséphine de Beauharnais. In 1821, the Bœuf was brought into the Tuileries Courtyard and the Palais-Royal. In 1851, it passed in front of the Élysée Palace, where President and future Emperor Louis-Napoléon Bonaparte lived. In 1863, the Bœuf Gras and its substantial procession entered the Tuileries Courtyard, where they paraded twice in front of the King and his family, who appeared to derive pleasure from the spectacle. From the Tuileries, the Bœuf Gras was subsequently led to Élysée-Bourbon, the Palais-Royal, the Palais Bourbon, and the hotels of prominent Parisian officials. The following year, a significant gathering of onlookers had amassed in the Tuileries Courtyard, where the event was open to the public. The procession made its way through the crowd, passing beneath the balconies where the emperor, empress, and imperial prince were situated. The procession then formed a semi-circle and proceeded to perform several symphonies. During the first half of the 19th century, after the day's festivities, the disguised members of the procession were invited to partake in a feast with the event organizer. This tradition resurfaced in 1870 in the Tuileries Courtyard.

At the close of December 1895, the Paris City Council articulated its desire for the procession, which was to be reinstated in 1896 "due to its extraordinary proportions," to commence at the Arc de Triomphe and traverse the Avenue des Champs-Élysées. This distinguished thoroughfare was partially used commencing the subsequent year. During the early 1900s, the route frequently remained constrained to the 19th arrondissement.

In 1907, the Bœuf Gras procession, which was one component of a larger series of events, began at Rue de Rivoli, traversed the Avenue des Champs-Élysées and the Avenue de Marigny, and culminated at the Élysée Palace. There, it was received by the secretary-general of the Presidency of the Republic, who presented a jewel to the Queen of Queens of Paris. However, by 1914, the scope of the parade had diminished significantly, with the procession limited to the main streets of the 5th and 13th arrondissements. While the queens elected for the festival were received at City Hall and the Élysée Palace, the Bœuf Gras did not receive the same honors. The participation of students in the procession persisted until 1924, and in 1926, they marched separately, with an ox fashioned from papier-mâché.

== The death of the Bœuf Gras ==
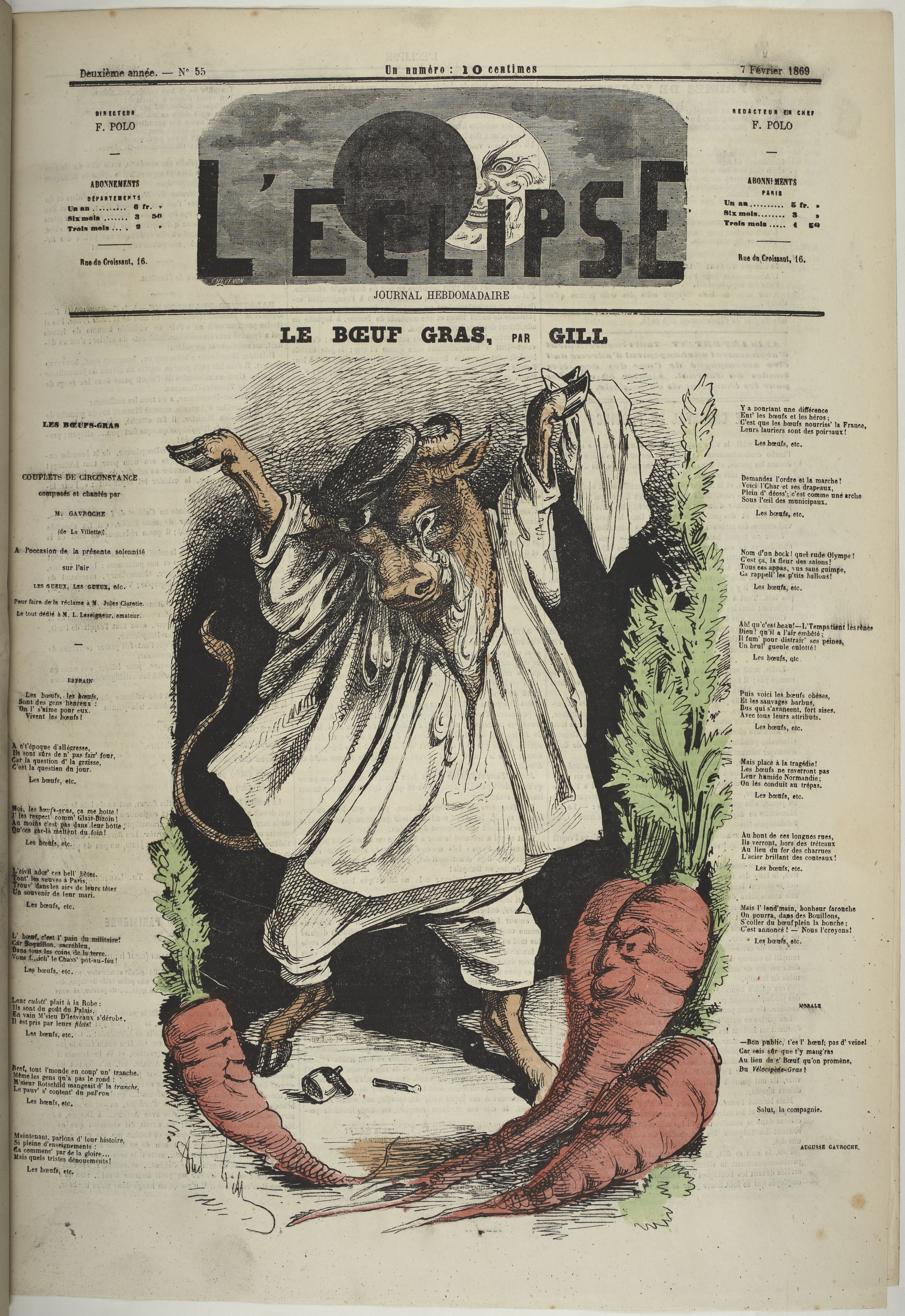
Le Bœuf Gras weeping over his impending end, Gill, 7 February 1869.

Following the parade, the Bœuf Gras (oxen) were slaughtered, and their meat was sold at a premium price by prominent butchers, who set the price at double the usual amount. In 1851, however, the breeder Adeline sold the meat of his animals at auction, similar to regular meat. As was often said, this allowed both the poor and the rich to enjoy Bœuf Gras. The purchase of an animal, or parts thereof, could be executed in bulk. In March 1867, a restaurateur placed an advertisement in Le Petit Journal for tripe à la mode de Caen, asserting that he was the sole buyer and owner of the tripe from the Bœuf Gras.

Rumors occasionally spread that the animal had not made it to the slaughterhouse. Thus, on 1 March 1840, the first day of the Bœuf Gras parade, there was considerable commotion.

Arriving at Rue Sainte-Apolline, this king of the carnival, succumbing under the weight of its grandeur and enormous corpulence, collapsed into the gutter. Its death was determined on the spot, and the butchers, improvising unworthy funerals, slaughtered it in the street. The death of the monstrous animal led to a scuffle and a few punches. It seems that when the Bœuf Gras dies, it is traditional for all those present to remove their hats as a sign of mourning and respect. The procession members did not fail to shout Chapeau bas! to the curious, ignorant of the tradition. When they did not think to comply with this custom, some boys from the procession detached themselves and began to attack, with punches, the hats of the defiant. This led to a scuffle that lasted for some time. A new Bœuf Gras was crowned that morning as the king of the carnival.

However, two days later, Le Moniteur parisien refuted the narrative of the street slaughter, asserting that the animal, unable to continue the parade, was subsequently transferred to the Poissy stockyard, where it spent the night. It was not slaughtered until ten days after its collapse. In 1861, according to La Semaine des familles, once more, an alleged Bœuf Gras collapsed in the street with a broken knee, and it was immediately euthanized. This incident, however, was not documented by La Presse littéraire.

Prior to the conclusion of the 20th century, the sole ox to have evaded the slaughterhouse was "L'Évènement." The newspaper's editor-in-chief, who had christened it with its name, declined to allow its demise and repurchased it for a sum of one thousand écus. Subsequently, he leased it to the Théâtre du Châtelet, where it made multiple appearances alongside the performers of the revue La Lanterne magique.

== Critical reception ==
=== Literary and journalistic reception ===
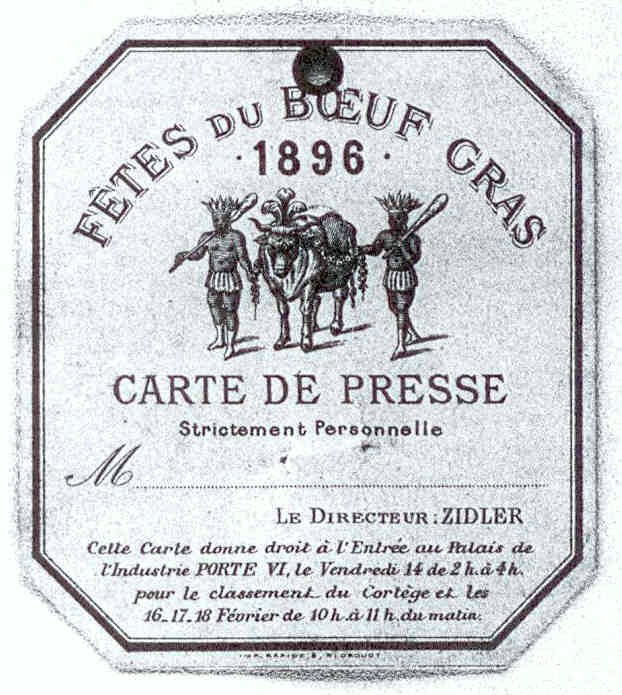
Press card for Bœuf Gras 1896, with the two traditional sacrificers dressed as savages.

The critical reception of the Bœuf Gras parades is overwhelmingly positive in the press, with descriptions highlighting the parade. However, it does not bring joy to all spectators. In 1834, a commentator for the Journal des artistes finds it silly. A few years later, in 1844, Delphine de Girardin writes about the Paris Carnival: "On the boulevard, the carnival was sad and ugly. […] The only magnificent thing was the Bœuf Gras: it was peach blossom, a beautiful color for a victim." In 1839, Gérard de Nerval objects to the view that the Promenade du Bœuf Gras should be transformed into an agricultural event to encourage French farmers. For him, it is a mystic remembrance of Roman antiquity that should be preserved in a society whose institutions parody those of that ancient time:

We will admit, seeing last Tuesday on our quays, crowded with people, the sacred ox, preceded by victim-lictors, and watching the heavy golden cart roll by, shaped in ancient style, where the old Saturn, regretted now more than ever, presides as in the days of Rome, we could not help but feel a sense of respect for this image of our fathers' old beliefs! No matter how poor this masquerade was, and how poorly it was executed, it was a joyful spectacle to see the pale glow of our sun fall upon these cheerful symbols, upon these crowned foreheads, upon these brilliant garments of gold and purple.

According to Philippe Busoni, the Bœuf Gras was considered "the most beautiful piece of festivity" during the Carnival in 1851. Two years later, Gustave Flaubert wrote to Louise Colet:

If you want to measure what public esteem is worth, and what a beautiful thing it is to be 'pointed at,' as the Latin poet says, you have to go out in the streets of Paris on Mardi Gras. Shakespeare, Goethe, Michelangelo never had 400,000 spectators at once, like this ox! What brings it closer to genius is that it is then cut into pieces.

At the conclusion of February 1860, Louis Jourdan, a prominent publisher who harbors a strong animosity toward the Paris Carnival, expresses his discontent regarding the Parisians' profound devotion to the Bœuf Gras tradition. He asserts that he finds no occurrence more disheartening and distressing than this "funeral masquerade," wherein "despicable individuals in disguise" exert "herculean efforts to feign amusement." However, Jourdan acknowledges that he perceives no government willing to take action against this tradition due to the potential backlash from the public. The popularity of the Bœuf Gras is also highlighted by A. Rolet in La Presse littéraire in March 1861. In 1857, Pierre Véron, in a poem that expresses disdain for the Paris Carnival, titled Un Mardi-Gras à Saint-Cloud, lamented:

C'était un mardi-gras, ami; dans chaque rue Grouillait en bourdonnant cette immense cohue, Fille de carrefours, prête dès qu'il le faut Pour un feu d'artifice ou pour un échafaud, Et qui, celle fois-là, courait tout empressée Voir une pauvre hôte, à grands frais engraissée, Traîner d'un pas boiteux sa masse avec effort, Triste joujou paré d'avance pour la mort !	It was Shrove Tuesday, my friend; in every street Buzzed this immense crowd, Daughter of crossroads, always ready, For fireworks or scaffold, And that time, it ran in haste To see a poor host, fattened at great expense, Drag its bulky mass with effort, A sad toy, already dressed for death!

For Victor Hugo, in Les Misérables (1862), the Bœuf Gras celebration is part of the "magnificent and joyful processions." The crowds that usually gather for the Bœuf Gras make it a reference in terms of notoriety. In La Nouvelle revue parisienne, H. de Pène writes in 1864: "Around the same days when the carnival threw its last little bells out the windows, a brochure appeared on and against the French Academy: La Conspiration des Quarante, with a title designed to attract as many people to the windows as the passage of the Bœuf Gras."

According to the perspective of illustrator and caricaturist Bertall, the conclusion of the Bœuf Gras in 1876 signaled the termination of the Paris Carnival, with only private nocturnal festivities persisting as authentically traditional. In 1889, Anatole France—under the pseudonym Gérôme—recalled the pleasure he had experienced as a child during the procession's passage. Two years prior, he had humorously suggested that Parisians, unable to witness the Bœuf Gras procession in Paris, could at least hear its Brussels counterpart via the recently introduced telephone. He asserted that this was a satisfactory solution, and that the rulers, who had refused for so many years to bring back the traditional Bœuf Gras, could at least offer a small compensatory pleasure to the Parisian population. While they would not witness the procession, the telephone would provide an auditory experience, offering a modest consolation." In 1891, when the Bœuf Gras had not paraded for twenty years, Richard O'Monroy asserted that the Bœuf Gras parade constituted a cherished memory for many Parisians, particularly those who experienced it during their childhood. Three years later, he voiced his opposition to what he regarded as specious justifications for the organization of the parade, namely the lack of financial resources and the absence of riders willing to participate in the procession. In the year of its return, 1896, John Grand-Carteret expressed his elation, and Le Figaro published a special issue containing the program of festivities.

During its last revival in 1998, ethnologist Anne-Marie Brisebarre criticized a project she viewed as political and lacking cultural value, as it kept little of the original tradition and its festive, religious, and professional meaning. She notes, for instance, that the celebration now takes place in September for climatic reasons rather than at Easter, which is generally colder, and that the consumption of the animal, the crowning symbol of the celebration, no longer occurs under the pretext of a less barbaric modern world. This last point, for her, is "revealing of the disturbing confusion in human-animal relations in urban environments."

=== The Bœuf Gras, source of inspiration in the arts ===
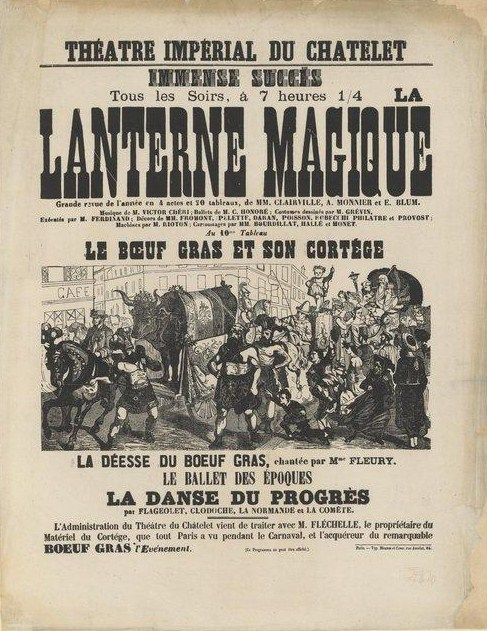
Poster for the 1866 production of La Lanterne magique at the Théâtre du Châtelet in Paris.

The Bœuf Gras has been a source of inspiration in the arts, particularly in theater. The animal appears in a play with signboards performed during the 1712 Carnival by the Great Troupe of Rope Dancers from the Jeu de paume d'Orléans, at the Saint-Germain fair. In 1745, the revival of Lully's Thésée inspired a parody of the same name, written by Charles-Simon Favart, Pierre Laujon, and Parvy, performed on 17 February at the Opéra-Comique. In this play, Thésée triumphs, mounted on a Bœuf Gras. A comical incident occurred during this performance, reported in 1812 by the Annales dramatiques: two men were in charge of moving the cardboard Bœuf Gras, one handling the front, the other the rear. The front man "released a flatulence that suffocated his colleague. The latter, in his first move, and to take revenge for the effect on the cause, bit what he found under his teeth. It made a terrifying moo." This led to a backstage fight that almost resulted in one of the two actors' death. The Bœuf Gras is also the more or less central subject of several other comic tragedies: La Mort du Bœuf Gras by Toussaint-Gaspard Taconet (1767), La Mort de Mardi-Gras by Voltaire (1809), La Descente de la Courtille by Théophile Marion Dumersan (1841), Le Bœuf Enragé (between 1842 and 1848), the famous Bœuf Gras by Paul de Kock (1845), Grande Complainte du Bœuf Gras 1859 by Boucher (1859), L'Ordre et la Marche du Bœuf Gras (1860), Les Bergers by Hector Crémieux and Philippe Gille with music by Jacques Offenbach (1865), Les Déesses du Bœuf Gras (1866), La Déesse du Bœuf Gras by Élie Frébault and Alphonse Lemonnier (1866). In 1866, in the 10th tableau of La Lanterne magique, Grande Revue de l'Année, a show by Louis-François Nicolaïe Clairville, A. Monnier, and E. Blum, the Bœuf Gras procession parades on stage, with the star being the Bœuf Gras L'Événement, which participated in that year's Promenade. The revival of Le Juif-Errant by the Théâtre de la Porte-Saint-Martin in 1877 included a Bœuf Gras cavalcade that impressed critics with its success. In 1914, the play Le Dialogue des Bœufs Gras by Louis Sonolet was published. After the death of caricaturist Cham in 1879, William Busnach proposed a fantasy at the Théâtre des Variétés, L'Œil du Commodore, in which the caricaturist dreams of finding one of his late uncles, now reincarnated in the body of the Bœuf Gras.

The Bœuf Gras also makes an appearance in opera. In the fifth act of La traviata (1853), set in Paris, as Violetta is dying, she hears from below her windows the Parisians – a chorus offstage – accompanying the animal during the carnival: "Hail to the Bœuf Gras; it's the most beautiful in the world, it is the king of the feast; it's our god: Parisians, let us sing the Bœuf Gras, etc."

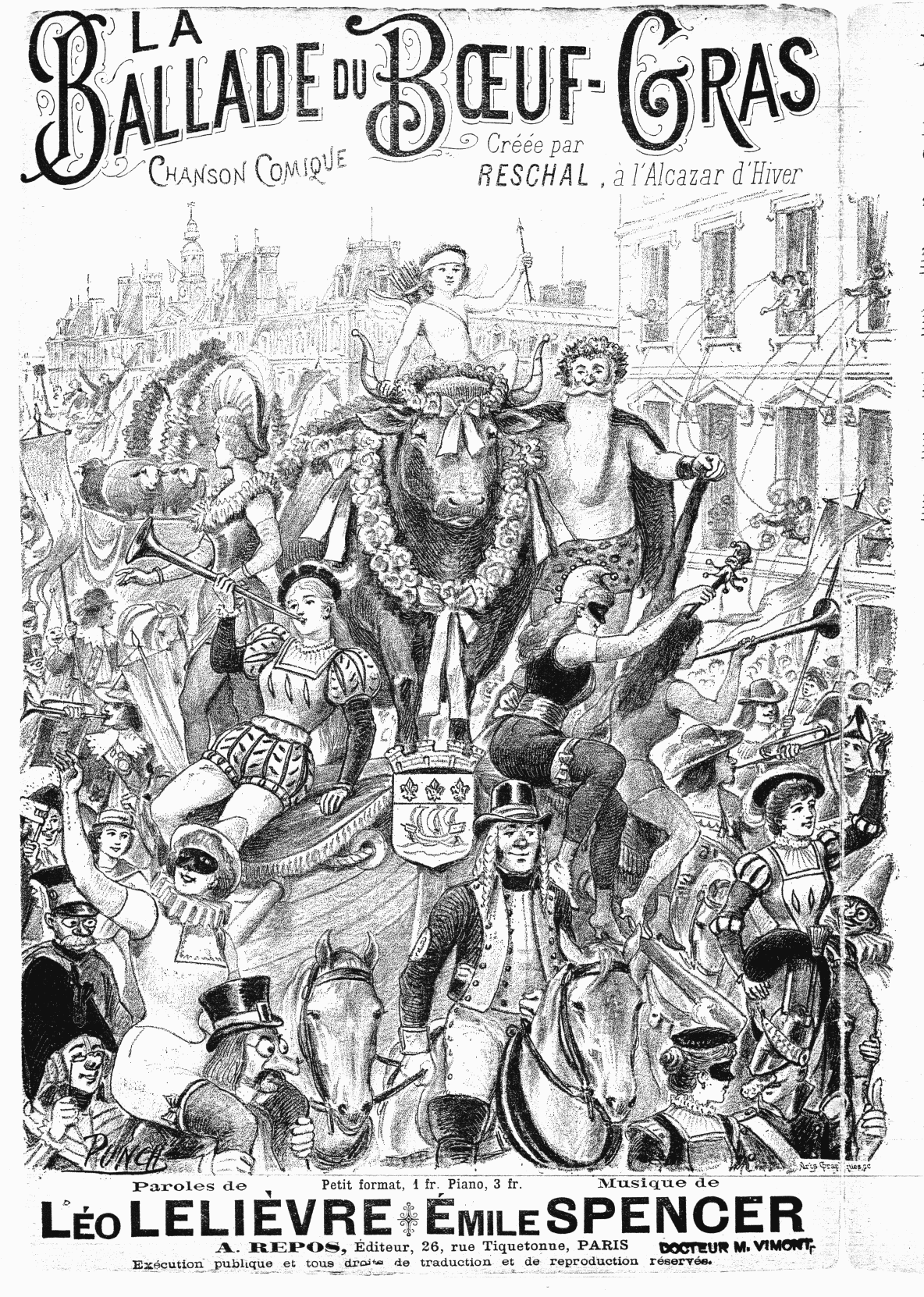
Cover of the score for the song La Ballade du Bœuf Gras. Drawing by Punch, 1895.

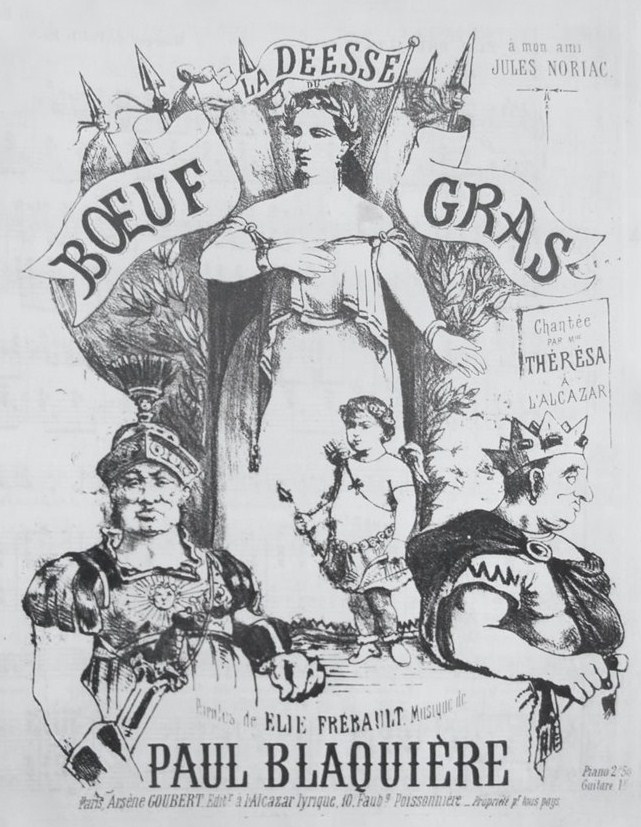
Cover of the score of the song La déesse du Bœuf Gras sung by Thérésa, 1866

A burlesque symphony, La Promenade du Bœuf Gras, for two violins, viola, cello, and nine children's toy instruments, (Note: Cuckoo trumpet, Basque drum, small drum, rattle, small bass drum, cymbals, triangle, horn (clay), Chinese hat (ad libitum).) was composed by Adolphe Blanc in 1870. Several songs are also dedicated to it. The oldest known written song, Le bœuf gras. Complainte, by Antoine Antignac, was published in a song collection in 1817. It includes the following verse:

Au bruit des fifres, des tambours,

Toute la capitale Peut admirer, pendant trois jours, Ma pompe triomphale. Sans être bien fin, Sur ma triste fin Je ne puis me méprendre; Car on dit : hélas ! Plus il sera las, Plus le bœuf sera tendre.

At the sound of fifes, drums,

The entire capital Can admire, for three days, My triumphant pomp. Without being too clever, I cannot mistake My sad end; For it is said: alas! The more tired it is, The more tender the ox will be.

The chansonnier Pierre Dupont dedicates a verse of his 1845 song Les Bœufs to it, and Eugène Désaugiers references it in Le Balcon from the same year. Following the French Revolution of 1848, the Bœuf Gras emerged as a recurring theme in revolutionary songs, including Louis-Philippe ou le Bœuf Gras détrôné (1848) and Du fouet à tous ces gros chiens-là! In the subsequent years, from 1852 to 1871, a significant proliferation of songs emerged that either referenced or were centered around the Bœuf Gras. In 1871, following the establishment of the Commune of Paris, the Communard song La marche du bœuf gras et la promenade du roi Guillaume dans Paris was written. Subsequently, in 1896 and 1910, comedic or carnival songs La Ballade du Bœuf-Gras and La Promenade du Bœuf Gras were released.

The theme is also reflected in the romantic literature and poetry. Honoré de Balzac references it in a dialogue in La dernière incarnation de Vautrin (1852), Victor Hugo marvels at its procession in Les Misérables (1862), and Pierre Lachambeaudie devotes a fable to it. Pierre Véron incorporates it into a poem that denounces the carnival (Un Mardi-Gras à Saint-Cloud, 1857), as do Maxime (Mes crêpes, 1873) and Raoul Ponchon (L'intrépide vide-bouteilles, 1820). Charles Audigé de Preuilly (Le Bœuf gras, before 1866), Arthur de Boissieu (La promenade du bœuf gras, 1870), and Charles Monselet (Bœufs gras, before 1880), Achille Millien (Au bœuf gras, 1896), and Georges Gillet (Rondel du bœuf gras, 1904) also dedicate poems to it. Georges Gillet writes:

Allez voir passer le bœuf gras, Triomphateur morne et placide Qui de l'abattoir homicide Semble déjà rêver tout bas ! Accompagnez de vos hourras Ce roi qu'attend le régicide ! Allez voir passer le bœuf gras Triomphateur morne et placide. Écrasez-vous, badauds, soldats, Femmes, enfants à l'œil avide, Et vous, gueux dont le ventre est vide, Pour remplacer un bon repas, Allez voir passer le bœuf gras !	Go see the Bœuf Gras pass by, Mournful and placid triumpher, Who, from the homicide slaughterhouse, Seems already to quietly dream! Accompany with your cheers This king who awaits regicide! Go see the Bœuf Gras pass by, Mournful and placid triumpher. Crush yourselves, gawkers, soldiers, Women, children with greedy eyes, And you, beggars with empty bellies, To replace a good meal, Go see the Bœuf Gras pass by!

A substantial corpus of iconographic documentation exists on the Bœuf Gras, encompassing various forms of visual representation such as drawings, engravings, paintings, (Note: A large painting donated by the purchaser of Parisian fat oxen, butcher Achille Fléchelle, is kept at the École de la Boucherie on boulevard Soult in Paris. It shows the procession passing through the courtyard of the Tuileries, with Emperor Napoleon III, his wife and son visible from a palace window.) and photographs. Among these photographs, notable figures include Hippolyte Bayard, who is known for his pioneering work in the field of stereoscopic photography, and anonymous photographers. The Bœuf Gras has also been captured on film by the Lumière brothers and Georges Méliès, further contributing to its visual documentation. The programs of the Bœuf Gras are adorned with anonymous woodcuts that illustrate the festival, caricatures published in newspapers – particularly by the caricaturist Cham — and images that illustrate poems, songs, and printed plays. The artists who have contributed to this subject include Gabriel de Saint-Aubin (1750), André Gill (1869), Alphonse-Charles Masson (1840), Guillaume-Frédéric Ronmy (1830), (Note: It is exhibited under the name Mascarade sur le Pont Neuf [Mascarade sur le Pont Neuf], in Paris, room 127 of the Carnavalet museum (Inv. p. 1080)) and Auguste Vimar (1902). The presence of the animal is also notable in early Empire period furniture. In the caricatures depicting butchers, the emphasis is often on the indecent opulence of the butcher, suggested by exaggerated corpulence or their rich costumes, their greed, and their prideful satisfaction.

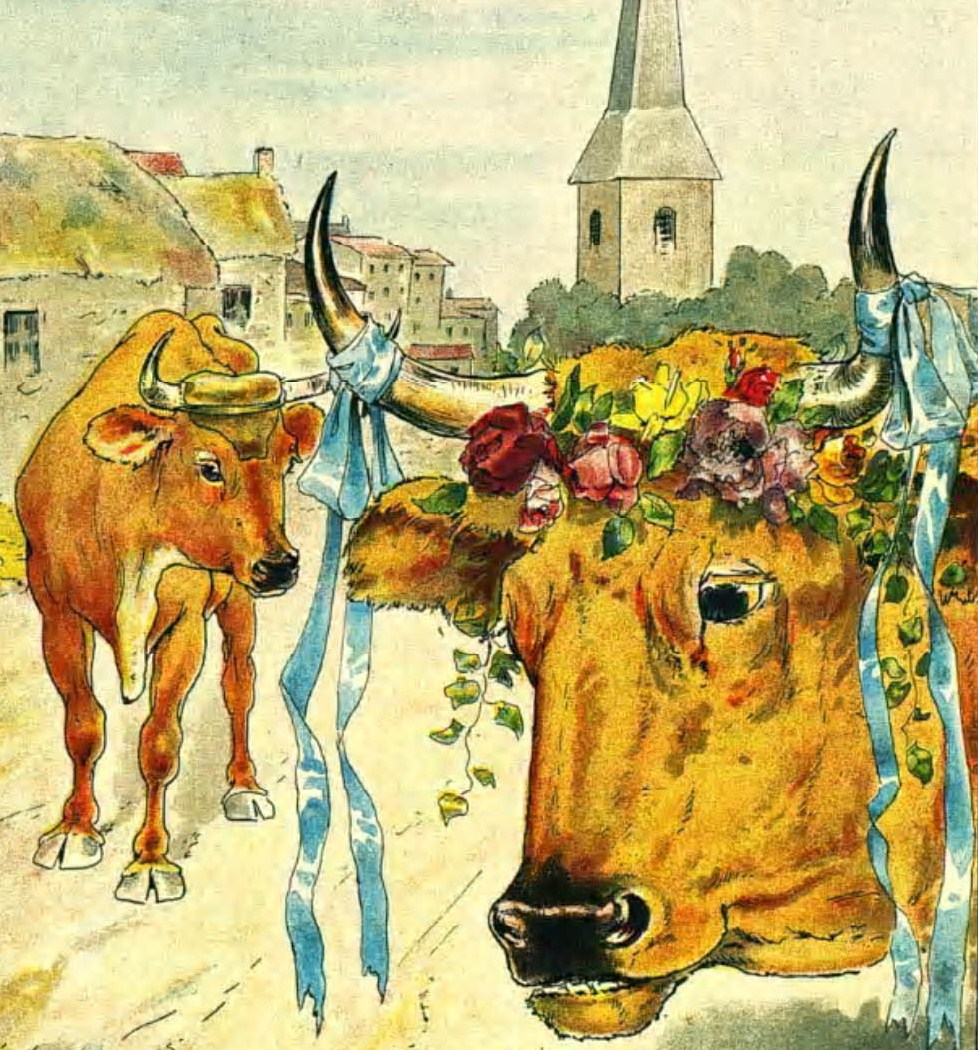
Le Bœuf gras et son compagnon seen by Auguste Vimar for a fable by Pierre Lachambeaudie, 1903

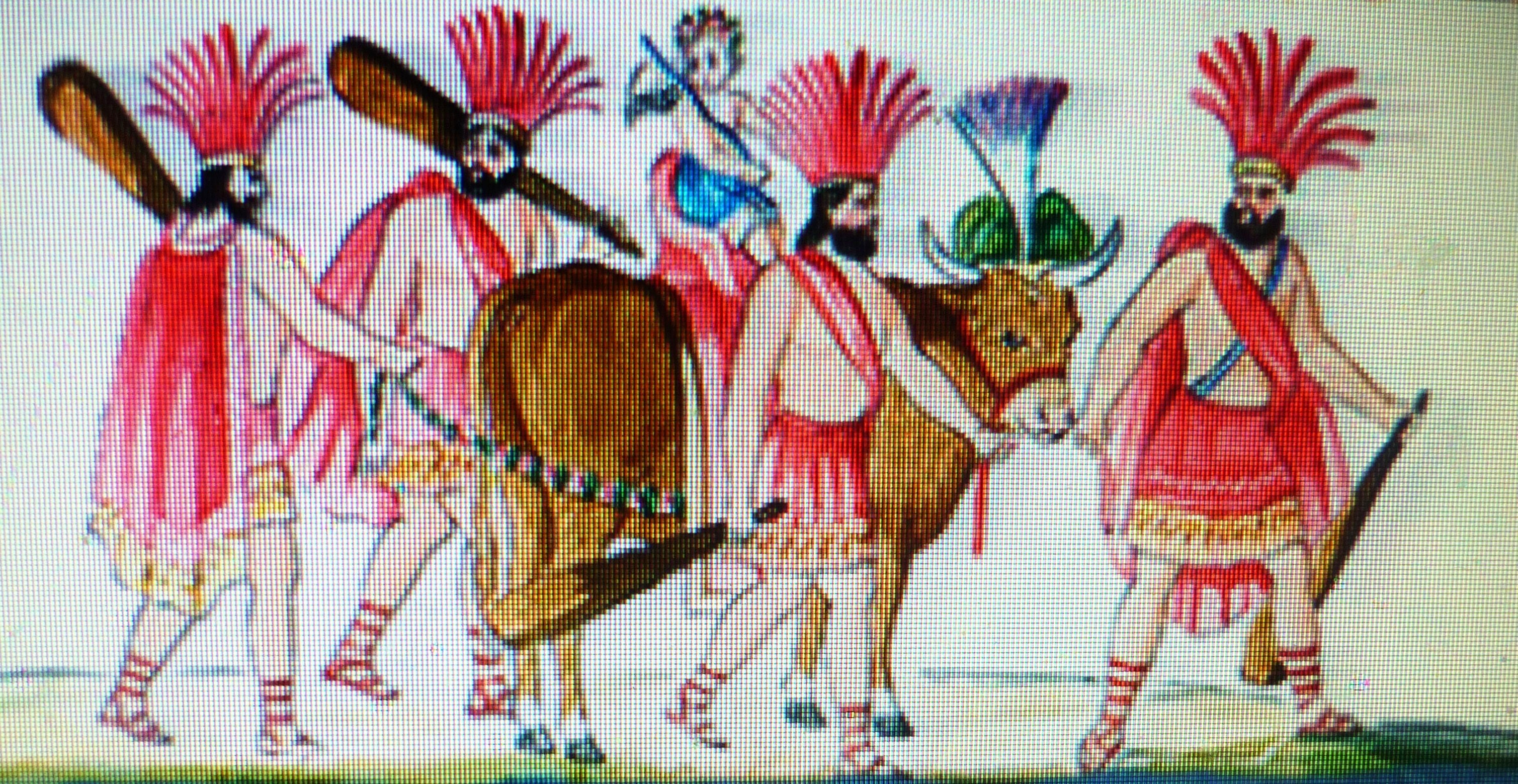
Le Bœuf Gras du Carnaval de Paris, drawing by Auguste Lapierre, detail of a glass plate for a magic lantern, circa 1850.

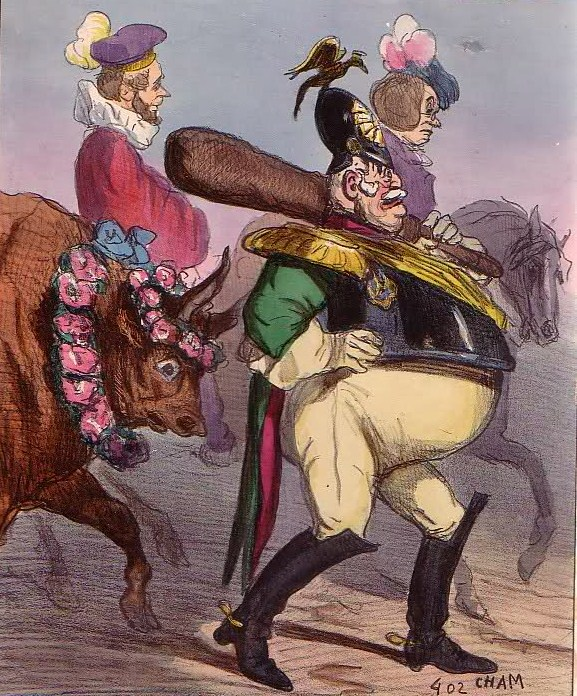
Watercolor cartoon Le Sauvage moderne, for the Boeuf Gras procession of 1855, by Cham.

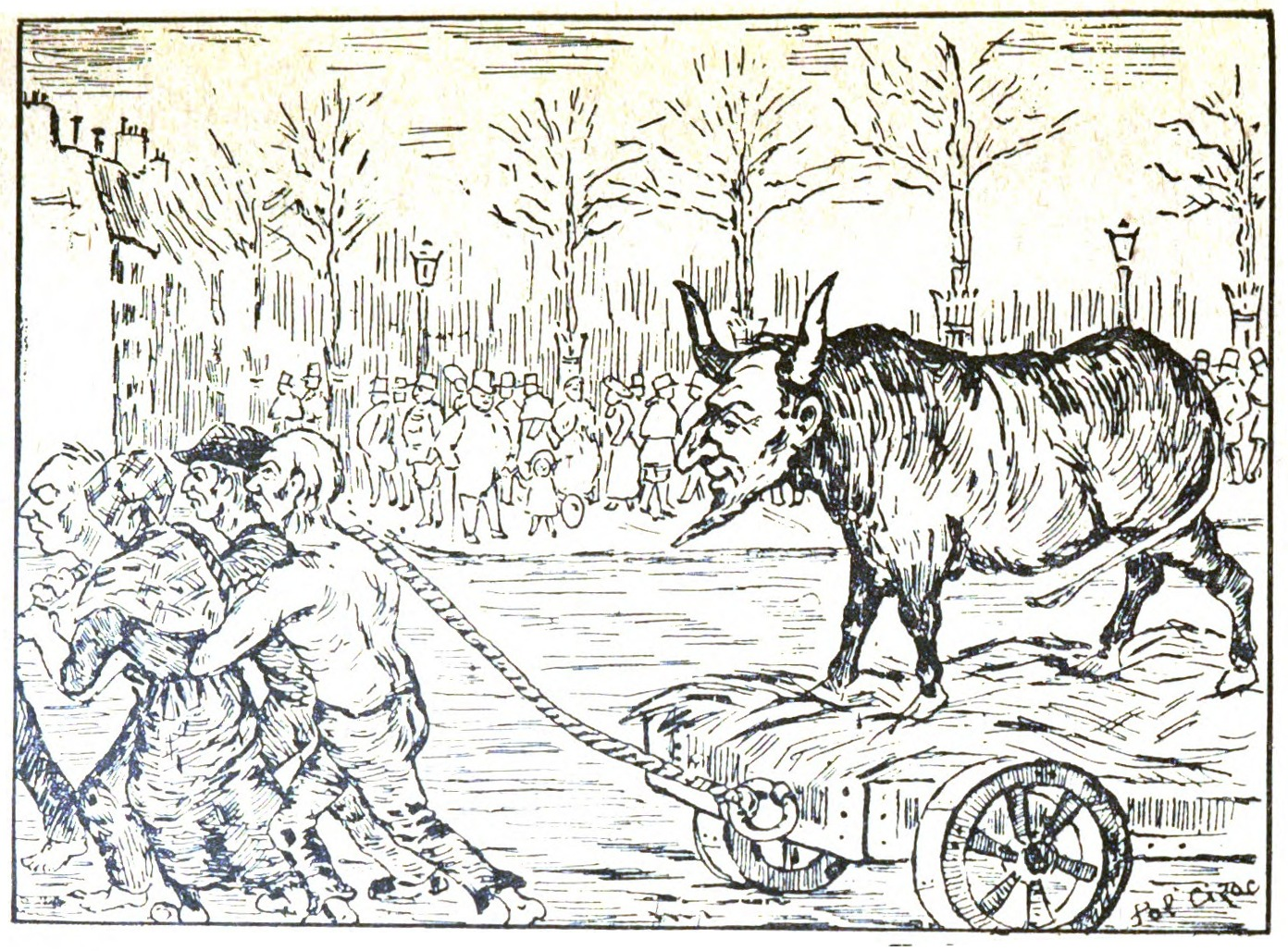
Anarchist cartoon by Pol Cizac, "Le populo trimballe le Bœuf gras... Il bouffe la Vache enragée", 1894.

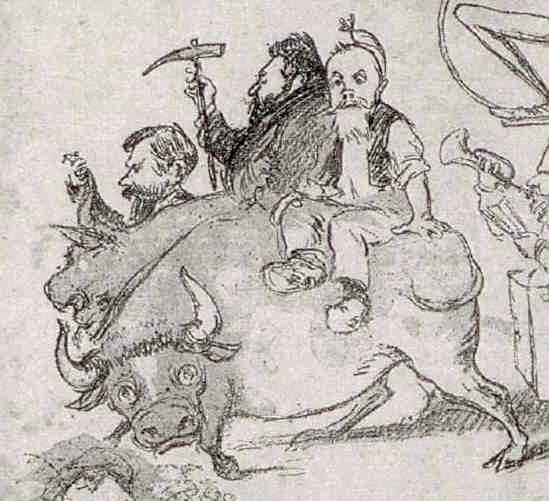
Detail from a cartoon by Charles Léandre depicting the Promenade du Bœuf, 1895.

=== Parisian festivals around the Bœuf Gras ===
An integral component of popular culture, numerous private organizations have adopted the theme of the Bœuf Gras.On 15 March 1849, to commemorate Mi-Carême, the 2nd Children's Ball was orchestrated at the Jardin d'Hiver. The culmination of this event featured a Bœuf-Gras, a structure that was modeled and painted by Mr. Hallé and decorated by Mr. Godillot in a style reminiscent of the Bœuf-Californie of 1849. This Bœuf-Gras was topped with a love figure in a palanquin, from which candies were distributed to the attendees.

Three years later, on 24 February 1852, at an opulent masked ball hosted by Charles Ponchard and his wife, attended by numerous artists including Jacques Offenbach, a miniature Bœuf Gras paraded:

After three encores of the Cris de Paris (a comic waltz composed for the occasion by Victor Parizot) and the comical performance of Polka des Bêtes Fauves, a very pleasant lyrical hors d'œuvre, created by the whimsical conductor of the Montansier, Mr. Hervé, the march of the Bœuf-Gras appeared with its banners and halberds, trumpets, and led by Mr. Cerclier from the Opéra-Comique. Strauss, in the role of a village fiddler, led the procession, drum in hand, for on this solemn occasion he had abandoned his bow, which would have made the dead dance. The Bœuf-Gras, brought at great expense from Lilliput to Paris, had no more than a decimeter in circumference and weighed just half a kilo. It was led by Levassor and Malézieux, preceded by the figure of Love, humorously represented by the blonde nephew of Mrs. Dorus-Gras. Verses in honor of the carnival were read by Charles Ponchard.

On the eve of the procession, 15 February 1896, an additional Bœuf Gras paraded at the Opéra ball, where a masked nocturnal celebration was underway. This procession proceeded to the accompaniment of a triumphant march performed by two prominent orchestras, with Egyptian trumpets, heralds, and 200 costumed participants serving as a prelude. Attendees of the ball were encouraged to adopt a domino adorned with a mask.

=== The Bœuf Gras in advertising ===
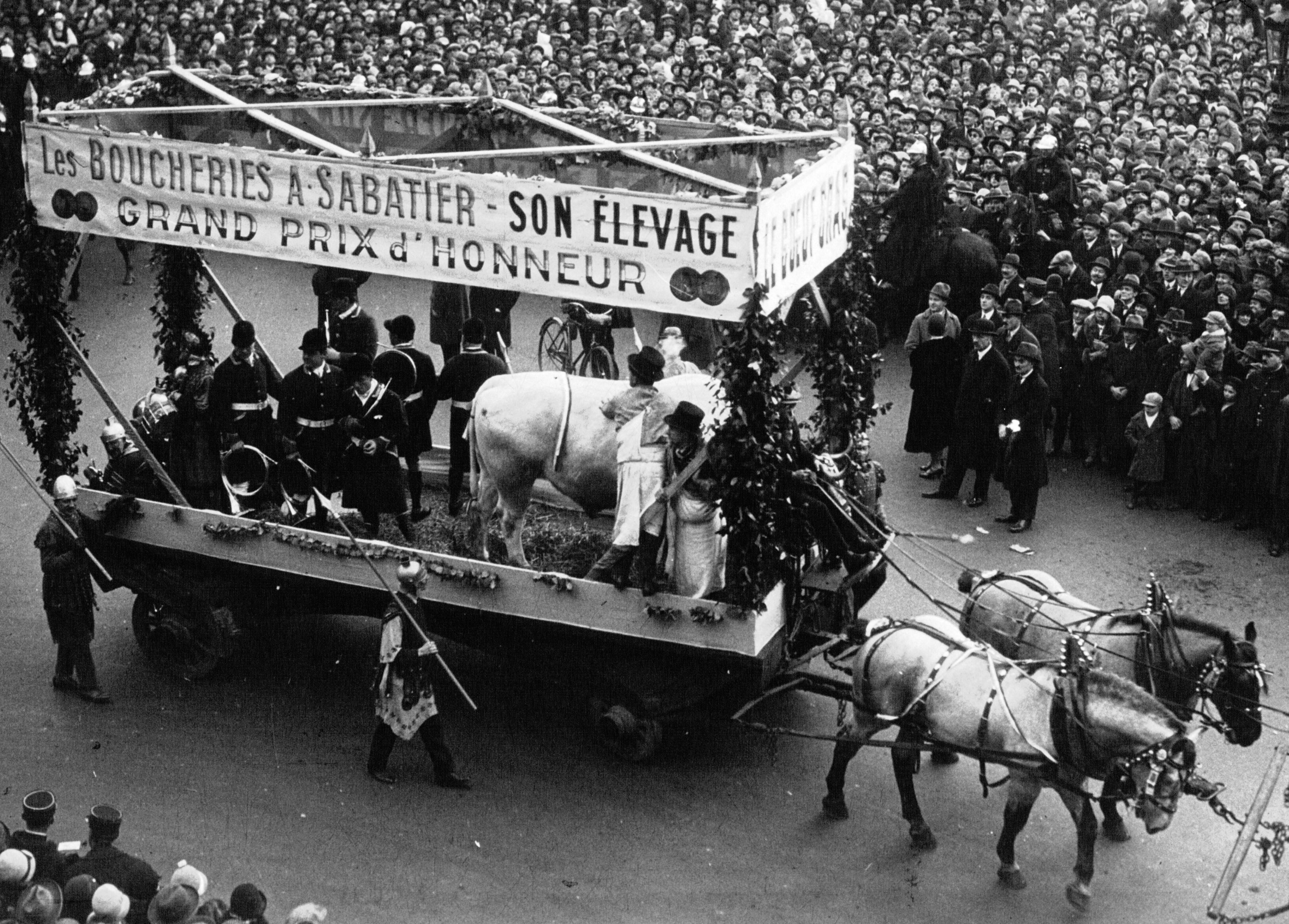
The Bœuf Gras float at the Mi-Carême 1928, carrying advertisements for Boucheries Auguste Sabatier.

The significance of the Bœuf Gras in popular culture attracted merchants and industrialists. These individuals capitalized on the animal's image for advertising materials or integrated it into the festivities. For example, after slaughter, the purchase of the animal's meat or offal by butchers or restaurateurs was intended to attract customers.

In 1864, Duval and other Parisian butcher merchants sued butcher Achille Fléchelle on the grounds that he displayed advertising on his storefront and his cart, using the merits of the animals he had purchased, specifically those from the Bœufs Gras of the 1854, 1855, 1857, 1859, 1860, 1861, 1862, and 1864 Paris Carnivals. The plaintiffs, who worked in the vicinity of Fléchelle, claimed that he was unjustly claiming the merit of the breeders and was misleadingly trying to make customers believe he was selling exceptionally high-quality meat. They lost their first trial on 9 July 1864, but won on appeal on 12 May 1865.

Advertising floats sometimes joined the parade. After a first participation in 1865, Rozières of Romainville, known for inventing pot-au-feu tablets, followed the procession in 1866 with a new stain remover product, Panamine: "It is because, after showing women how to color their broth, Mr. Rozières now shows them how to clean their clothes," exclaims Timothée Trimm, who criticizes "this contemporary materialism in its most vulgar expression." In the same procession, a Similor-liquid float, for cleaning kitchenware, took part. The following year, among the advertising floats, the presence of Mr. Galopin, a pedicure artist, stood out, claiming to cure various foot ailments in one day using a pump of his invention. In 1868, Breton peasants on horseback carried colorful banners with the inscription "Duval, purchaser" and preceded a musical group escorting the butcher Duval's float.

In 1896, authorities sought to limit the proliferation of advertisements and banned advertising floats from joining the procession. Photographs from the 1927 and 1928 Bœuf Gras parades demonstrate that Auguste Sabatier, president of the Paris Festival Committee and organizer, used the occasion to advertise his business. This practice aligns with a tradition established by prominent butchers such as Porret, Fléchelle, and Duval, the latter being the creator of the renowned Duval broths. In 1928, Sabatier's actions indirectly served as political propaganda, as evidenced by the Bœuf Gras parade on 15 March, which extolled the virtues of Auguste Sabatier's butcher shops. Concurrently, Sabatier was campaigning for elections in Paris, ultimately being elected deputy for the 2nd district of the 18th arrondissement, the Clignancourt neighborhood, on 29 April.

Advertisements bearing the image of the Bœuf gras walk

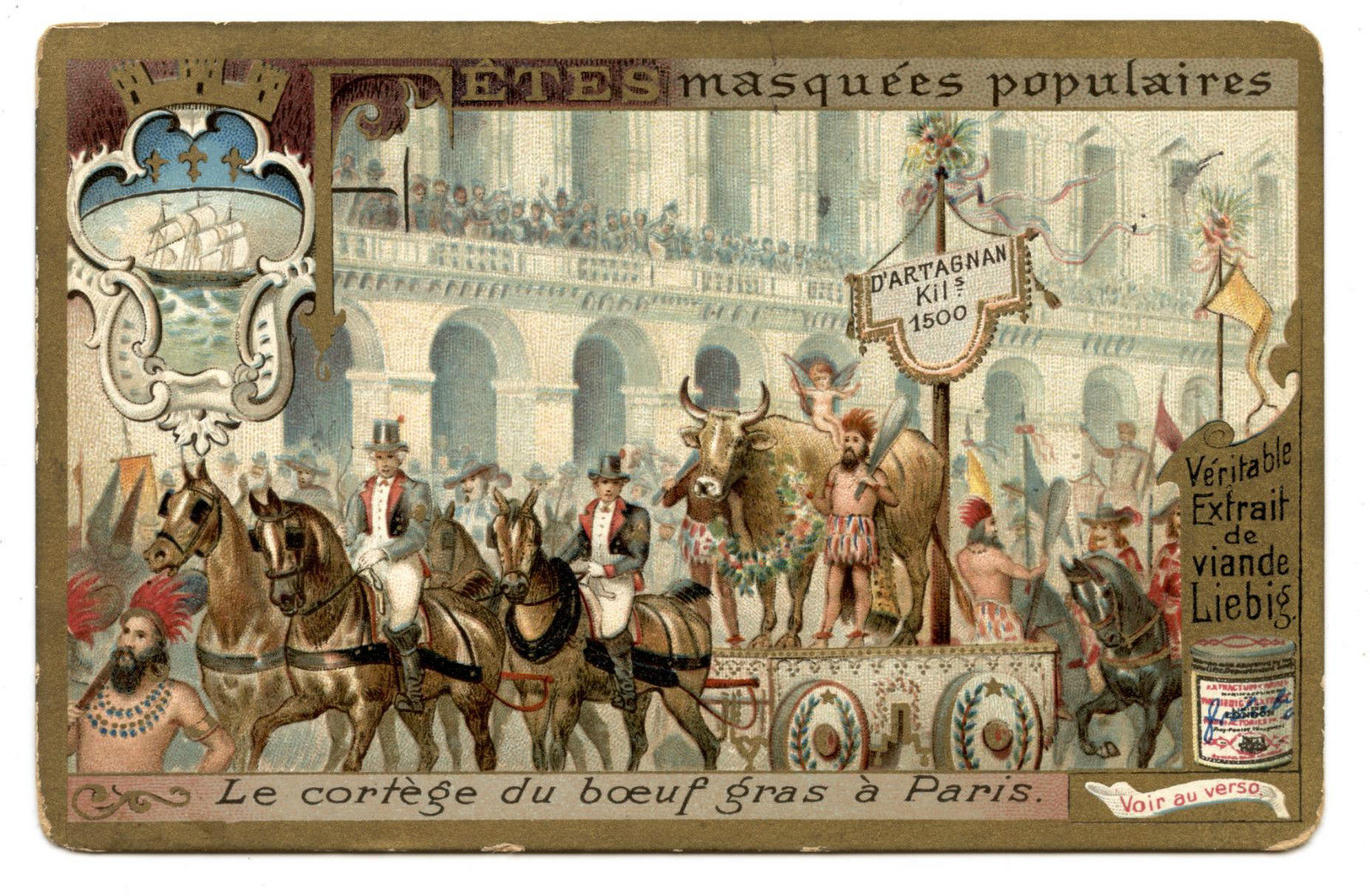
Meat extract

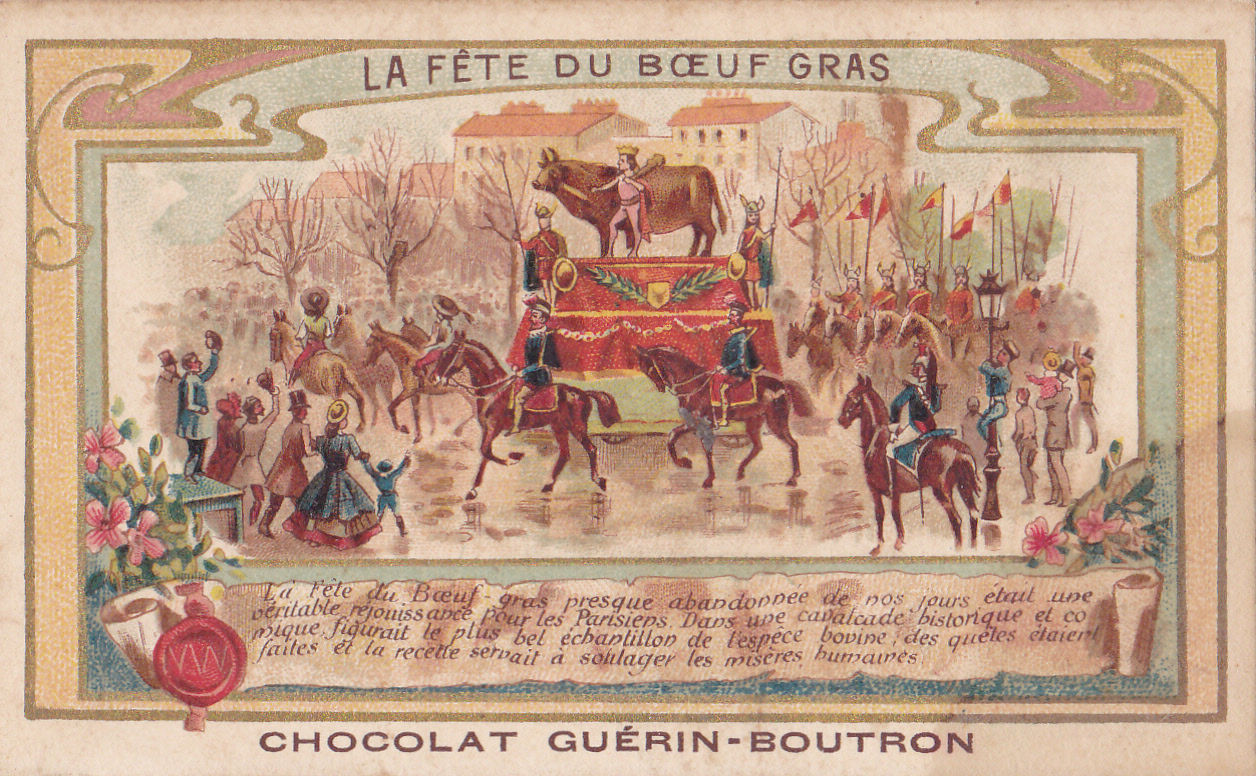
Chocolate

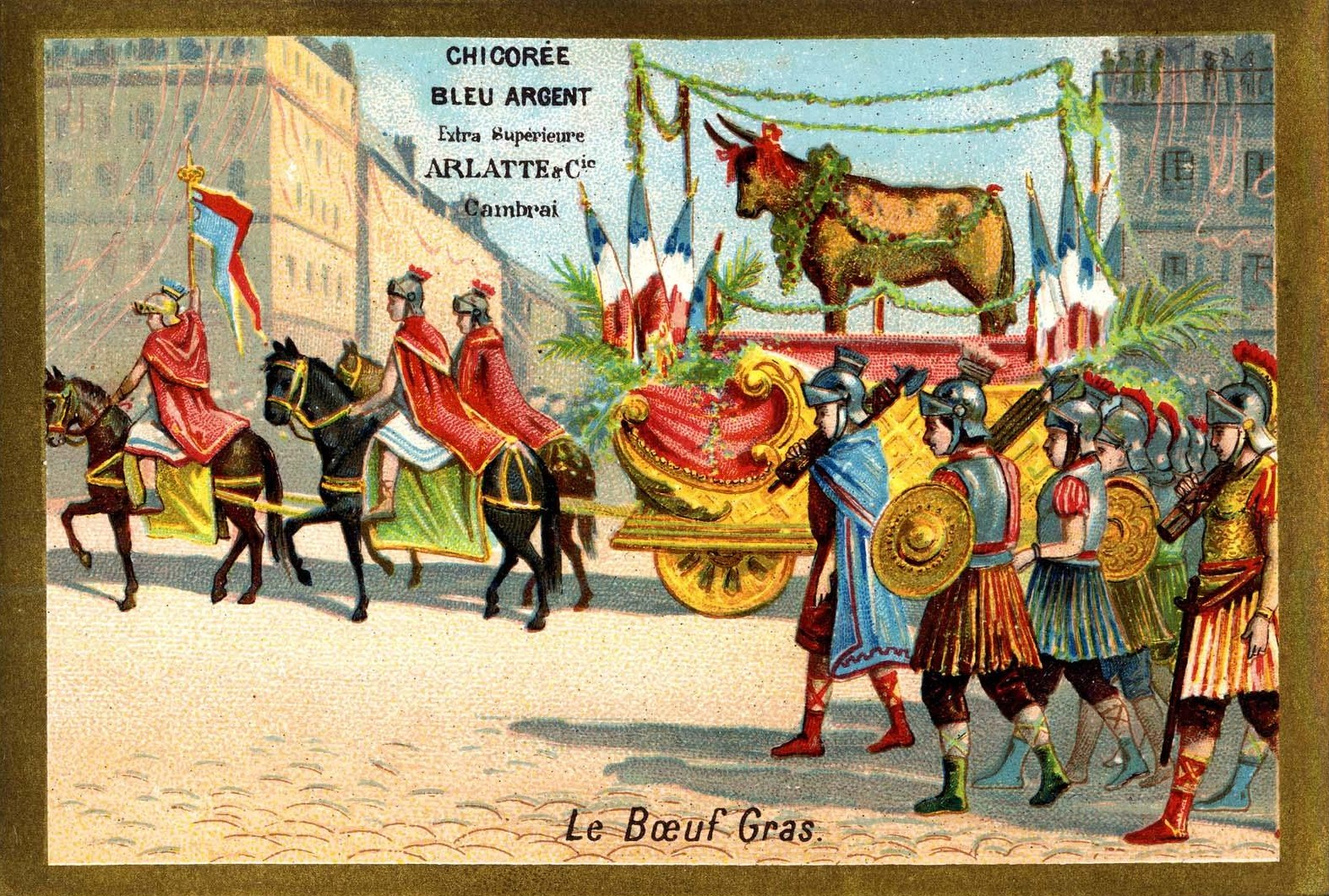
Chicory

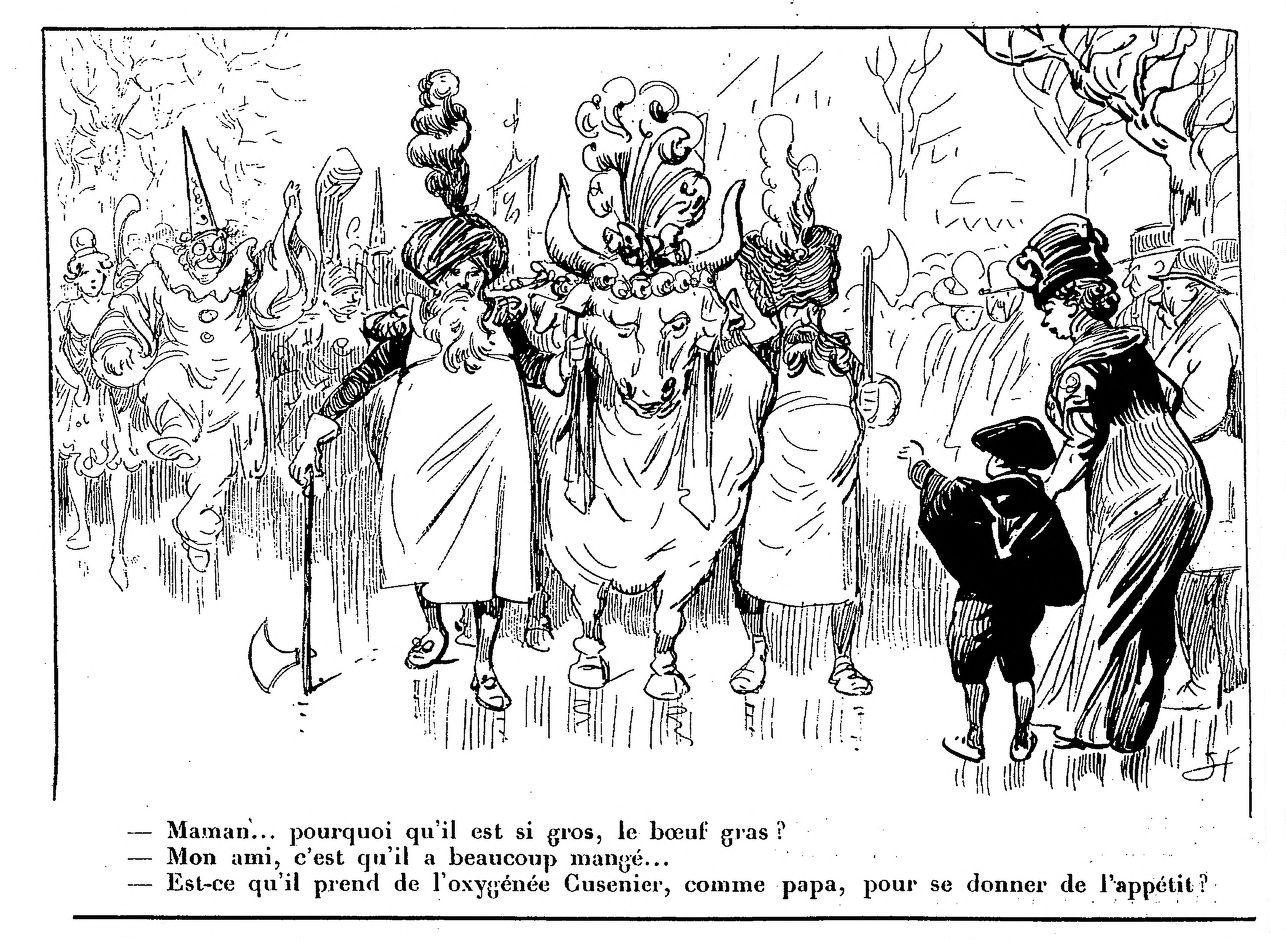
Spirits

== See also ==
- Paris Carnival
- Bœuf Gras
