= Audran =

The Audrans were a family of French artists, natives of Paris and Lyons.

- Charles Audran I (1594-1674)
- Claude Audran I (1597-1677)
- Germain Audran (1631-1710), son of Charles I
- Claude Audran II (1639-1684), nephew of Charles I
- Gérard Audran (1640-1704), son of Charles I
- Claude Audran III (1658-1734), son of Germain
- Benoit Audran the Elder (1661-1721), nephew of Gérard
- Jean Audran (1667-1756), nephew of Gérard
- Louis Audran (1670-1712), son of Germain
- Benoit Audran the Younger (1698-1772), son of Benoit the Elder
- Prosper Gabriel Audran (1744-1819), grandson of Jean

Further:

- Marius-Pierre Audran (1816-1887), French operatic tenor.
- Edmond Audran (1842-1901), operetta composer
- René Audran general, high officer at the French defense ministry, murdered 1985 by Action Directe
- Stéphane Audran (1932–2018), actress
