= Claude Audran =

Claude Audran may refer to:

- Claude Audran the Elder (1597–1677), French engraver
- Claude Audran the Younger (1639–1684), French engraver and painter, son of the above
- Claude Audran III (1658–1734), French painter, nephew of the above
