= Jean Audran =

French artist (1667–1756)

Jean Audran (1667–1756) was a French engraver and printmaker. The brother of Benoit, and the third son of Germain Audran, he was born at Lyons, Lyonnais, in 1667. After learning the rudiments of the art under his father, he was placed under the care of his uncle, the famous Gérard Audran, in Paris. Before he was twenty years of age he displayed uncommon ability, and became a very celebrated engraver. In 1706 he was made engraver to the king, with a pension and apartments at the Gobelins. The hand of a great master is discernible in all his plates; and without having attained the extraordinary perfection of Gérard Audran, his claim to excellence is very considerable. He died in 1756. His principal prints are:

== Portraits ==
- Louis XV; full length; after Gobert.
- Maximilian Emmanuel, Elector of Bavaria, with his Page; full length; after Vivien.
- Clement Augustus of Bavaria, Elector-Archbishop of Cologne; after the same.
- The Duke d'Antin; after Rigaud.
- The Abbé Jean d'Estrées; after the same.
- Victor Marie, Duke d'Estrées, Marshal of France; after Zargilliere.
- Cardinal Pietro Ottoboni; after Trevisani.
- François de Salignac de la Motte Fenelon, Archbishop of Cambray; after Vivien.
- François Pierre Gillet; after Tortebat.
- Francois Robert Secousse, sitting; after Rigaud.
- Peter Paul Rubens; after van Dyck; for the Luxembourg Gallery.
- Noel Coypel, Painter to the King; after Coypel.
- Antoine Coysevox, Sculptor to the King; after Rigaud. [The two last were engraved by Audran for his reception at the Academy in 1708.]

== Subjects after various masters ==
- Our Saviour preaching to the Multitude; after Raphael.
- The Infant Saviour regarding the Cross presented by Angels; after Albani.
- The Nativity; after Pietro da Cortona; oval.
- The Good Samaritan; after Ann. Carracci; arched.
- St. John administering the Sacrament to the Virgin; after Lodovico Carracci.
- Our Saviour on the Mount of Olives; after Domenichino.
- St. Andrew led to Crucifixion; after Guido.
- The Martyrdom of St. Peter; after Guido; on the plate improperly called after Domenichino.
- St. Paul preaching at Athens; after Ciro Ferri; a small frieze.
- The Triumph of Galatea; after Carlo Maratti; for the Crozat Collection.
- The Miracle of the Loaves; after Claude Audran.
- Six plates — Copies of the large Battles of Alexander; by G. Audran.
- St. Augustine; after P. de Champagne.
- Simeon holding the Infant Jesus; after M. Corneille.
- Moses saved from the Nile; after Ant. Coypel.
- Jacob and Laban; after the same.
- Athaha and Joash; after the same.
- Esther before Ahasuerus; after the same.
- The Resurrection; after the same.
- Cupid and Psyche; after the same.
- Our Saviour curing the Sick; after Ant. Dieu.
- Christ bearing His Cross; after the same.
- The Elevation of the Cross; after Van Dijck.
- The Crucifixion; after the same.
- The French Parnassus; after the bronze by Gamier.
- The Miraculous Draught of Fishes; after Jouvenet.
- The Resurrection of Lazarus; after the same.
- The Queen Blanche inspired with the Holy Spirit; after the same.
- Acis and Galatea; after F. Marot.
- Venus punishing Psyche; after J. M. Nattier.
- Psyche consoled by Cupid; after the same.
- The dead Christ, with the Marys, St. John, and Nicodemus; after Poussin.
- The Rape of the Sabines; after Poussin; his most esteemed print.
- St. Scholastica at the point of Death; after J. Restout.
- Andromache entreating for her Son; after L. Silvestre.
- Henri IV deliberating on his future Marriage; after Rubens.
- Henri IV departing for the German War; after the same.
- The Coronation of Marie de Médicis; after the same. [The three last form part of the Luxembourg Gallery.]
