= Cultural references to Samson =

Samson was a character in the Biblical Book of Judges. He is said to have been raised up by God to deliver the Israelites from the Philistines. In the story, God grants him unusual strength, which is facilitated by a Nazirite vow prohibiting him from cutting his hair. His strength and violent temper are illustrated in several colorful stories portraying him as dominant over man and nature. He also succeeds in his charge to battle the Philistines, more through acts of personal vengeance than by any formal military strategy. Eventually the Philistines defeat him by bribing his new love interest, Delilah, into extracting from him the secret to his strength. Once learned, the Philistines cut his hair while he sleeps, at which point he is easily defeated.

The stories of Samson have inspired numerous cultural references, serving as a symbol of brute strength, heroism, self-destruction, and romantic betrayal. This article surveys these references in religion and mythology, art and literature, film and music, and folklore.

== Traditions and mythology ==
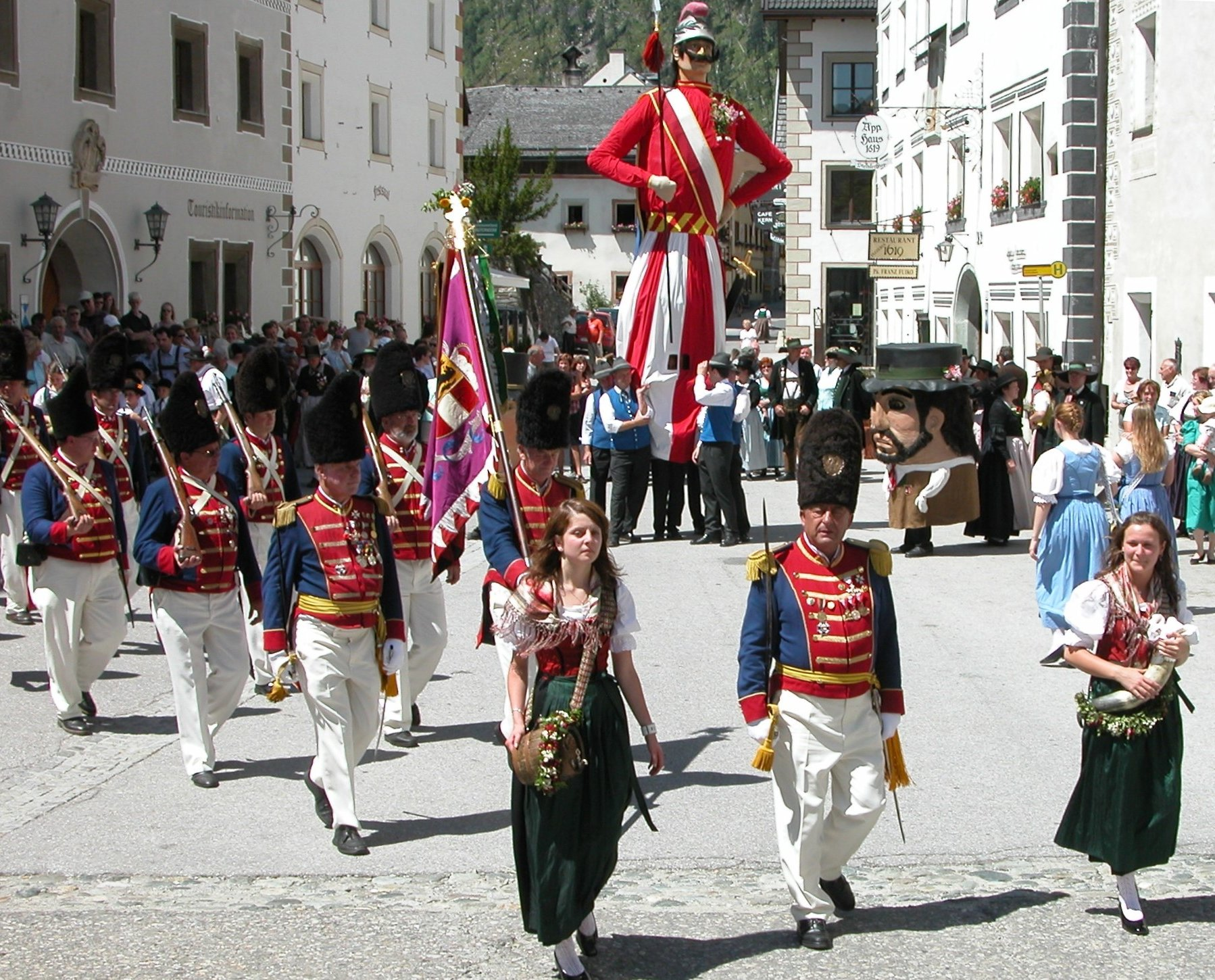
Samson parade Mauterndorf, Austria.

=== Samson parades ===
Annual parades of Samson figure in 10 different villages in the Lungau, Salzburg (state) and two villages in the north-west Steiermark (Austria). For more information see Wikipedia in German de:Samsonfigur or French fr:Samson (géant processionnel). Samson is also one of the giant figures at the "Ducasse" festivities, which takes place at Ath, Belgium.

=== Basque mythology ===
There is an elaboration of the biblical character in Basque mythology which differs in its features from the original. Quite paradoxically, the Basque Samson does not stand for Christian values, but is represented as a giant living in the mountains far from other inhabitants of the villages and the valley; he is a jentil or Basque pagan of the forest. As told in many folk accounts, endowed with might as he is, he launches rocks that lie at the origin of different prominences and hills all over the Basque Country, especially in the west, while in the east the preferred character to account for similar phenomena is the medieval hero Roland, Errolan in Basque.

=== Israeli culture ===
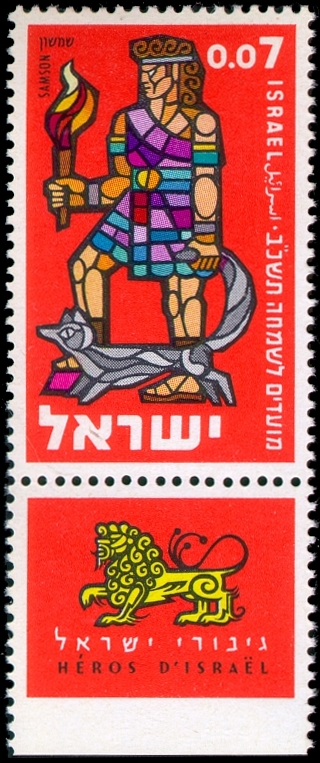
Stamp of Israel dedicated to Samson, 1961

"The figure of "Samson the hero" played a role in the construction of Zionist collective memory, and in building the identity of the 'new Jew' who leaves behind exilic helplessness for Israeli self-determination", Benjamin Balint, a writer in Jerusalem, has written.

Vladimir Jabotinsky (1880–1940), the founder of Revisionist Zionism wrote a 1926 novel in Russian (English translation in 1930), Samson in which the author makes Samson an assimilated Jew attracted by the surrounding, more sophisticated (and un-philistine) Philistine culture. Considered a basic text of Revisionist Zionism, Jabotinsky's followers found in it numerous hints of contemporary Zionist and Israeli politics. Among other things, the family name of present day Israeli politician Dan Meridor is derived from this book. "Meridor" (literally "Generation of Rebellion") is the name given by Samson to a child in the book.

Some important Twentieth century Hebrew poems have also been written about the Bible hero. More recently, elite Israeli combat units have been named "Samson", and the Israeli nuclear program was called the "Samson Option".

Noam Chomsky and others have said Israel suffers from a "Samson complex" which could lead to the destruction of itself as well as its Arab enemies. Israeli journalist and historian, Yoav Rinon, is also critical of the prominent role played by Samson, alongside the Masada myth, in the Israeli society.

== Art ==
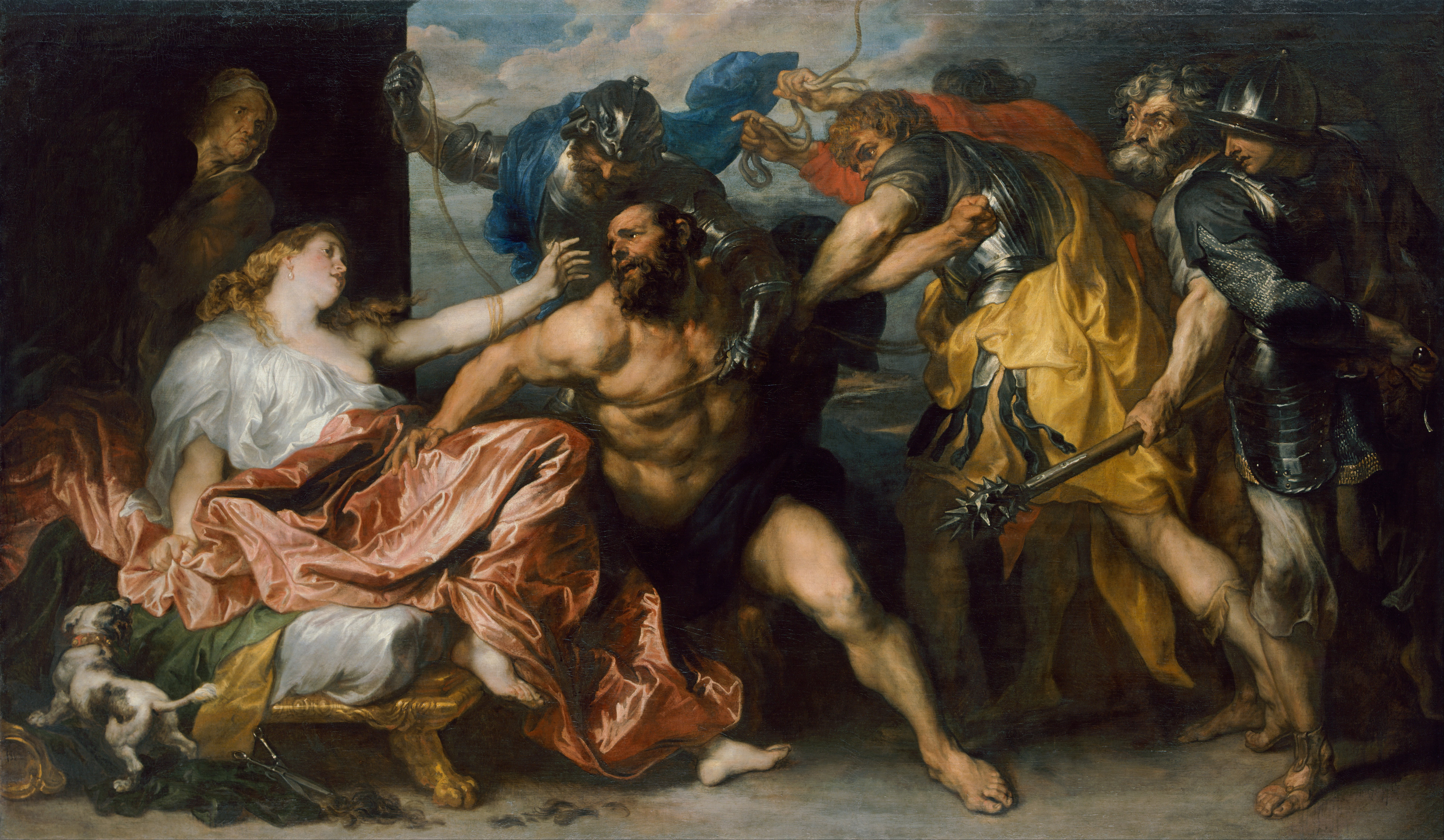
Anthony van Dyck, Samson and Delilah (ca 1630).

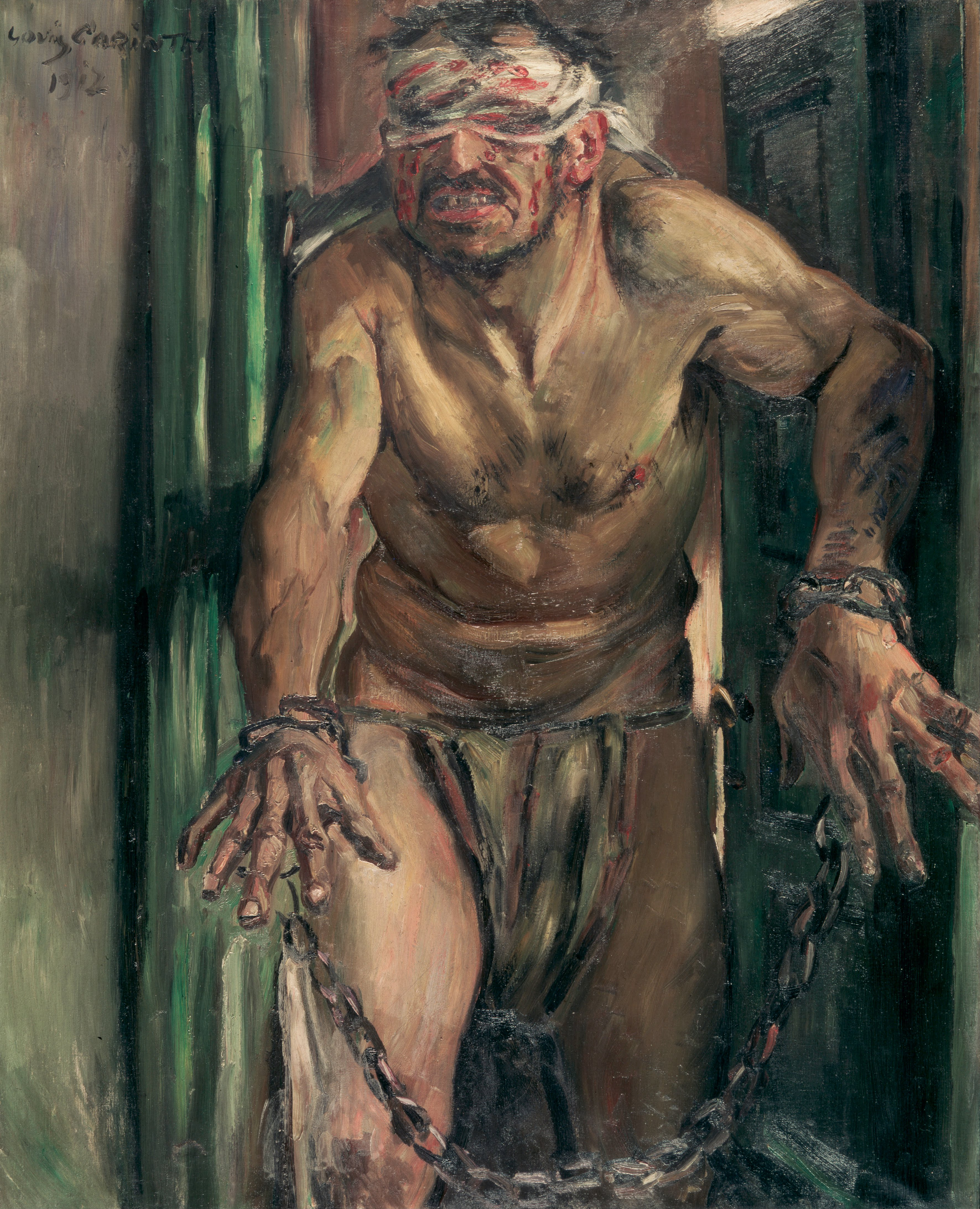
Lovis Corinth, The blinded Samson (1912).

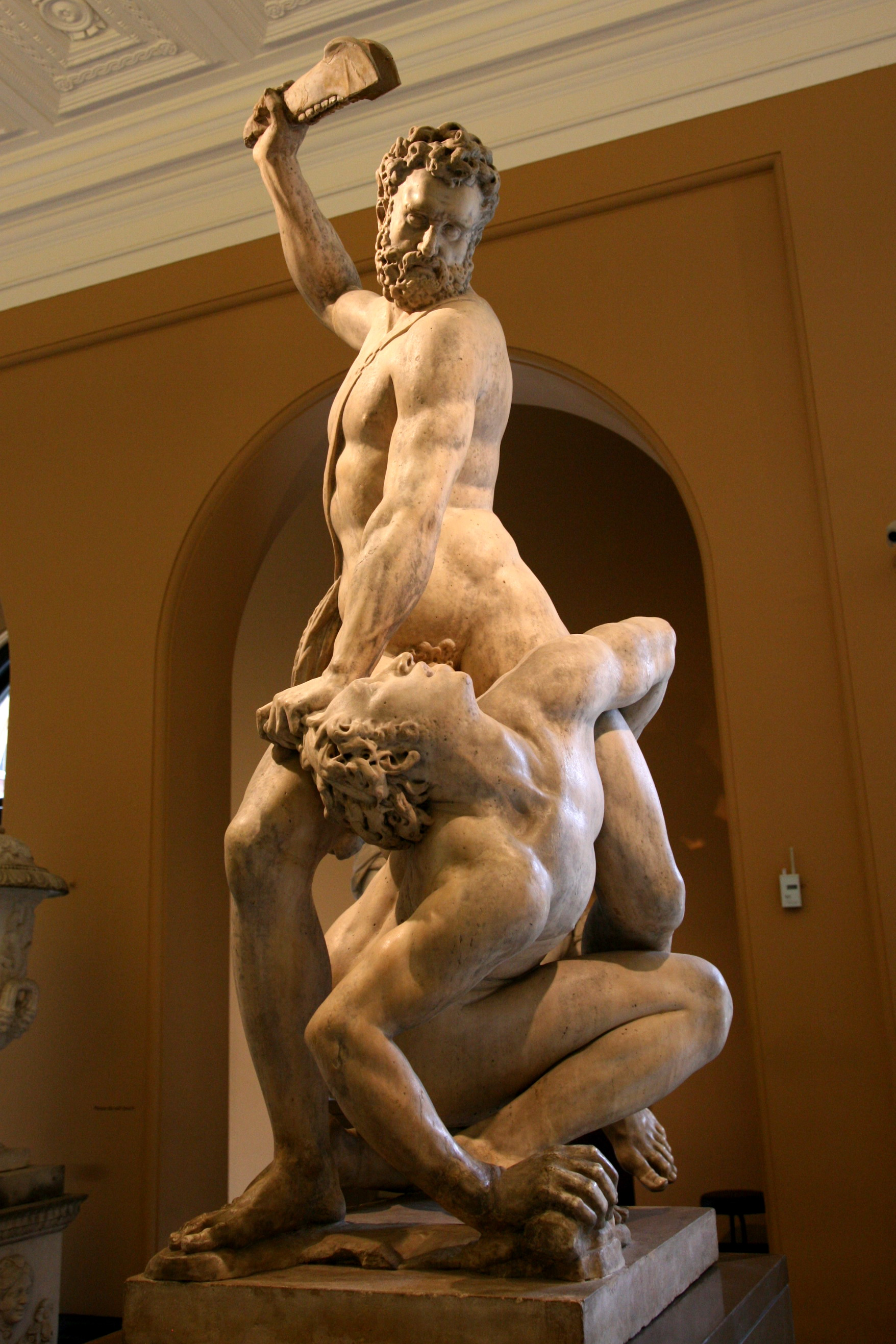
Samson Slaying a Philistine, by Giambologna (c. 1562).

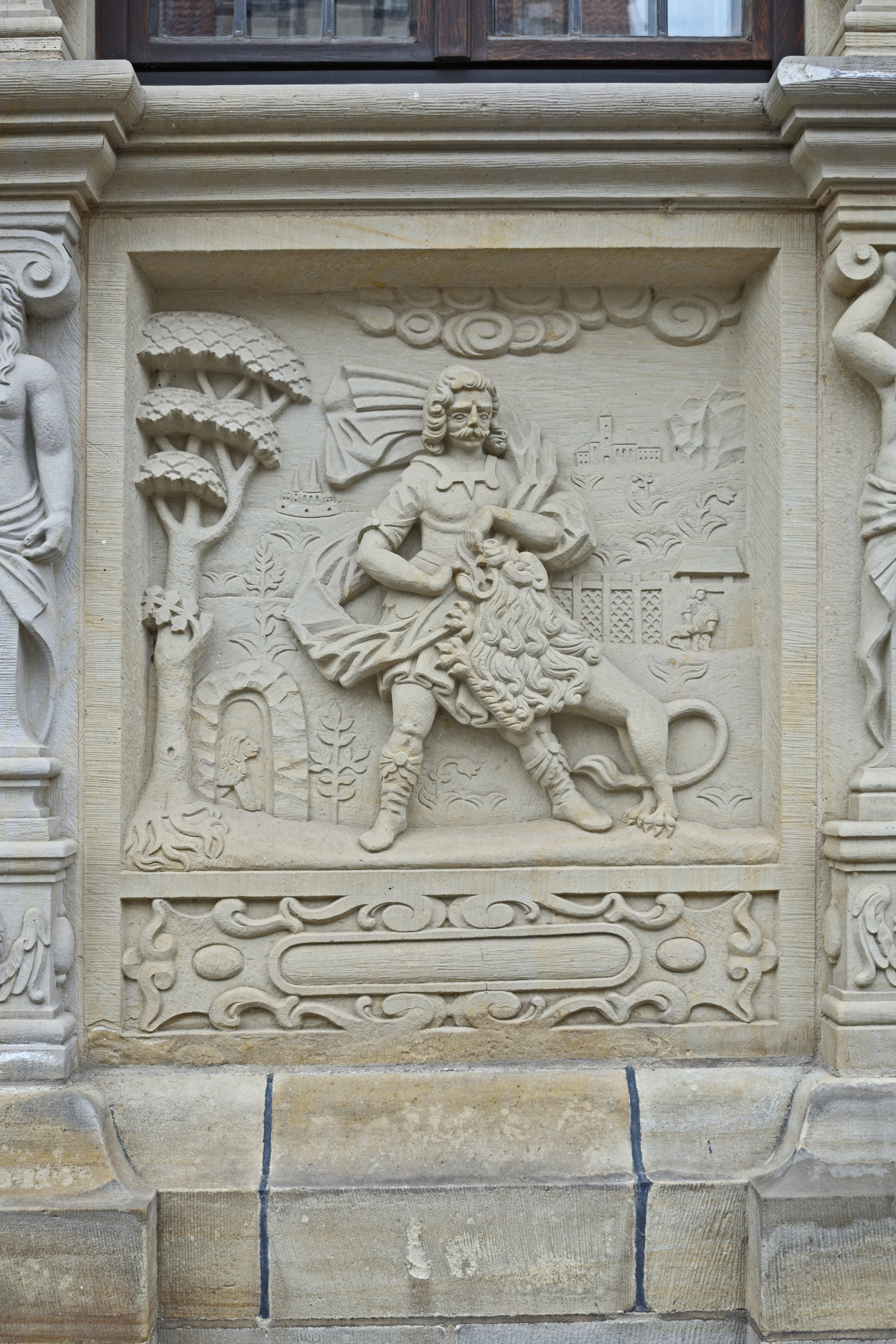
Samson, a relief on the facade of the Leibniz House, Hanover, destroyed in 1934 and recreated in 1983 by Georg Arfmann.

Samson has been a popular subject for painting and sculpture:

- Alexander Anderson, Samson Fighting the Lion, ca. 1800 Fine Arts Museums of San Francisco
- Jean Audran, after F. Verdier, The Burial of Samson, ca. 1700 Fine Arts Museums of San Francisco
- Giovanni Francesco Barbieri (Guercino), Samson and the Honeycomb, ca. 1657 Fine Arts Museums of San Francisco
- Niccolu Boldrini, after Titian, Samson and Delilah, ca. 1540–1545, Fine Arts Museums of San Francisco
- Boucicaut Master, Samson and the Lion, 1415, Getty Museum
- Hans Burgkmair the Elder, Samson and Delilah, ca. 1500 Fine Arts Museums of San Francisco
- Lovis Corinth, Samson Blinded, 1912
- Giuseppe Caletti (Il Cremonese), Samson and Delilah, ca. 1625 Fine Arts Museums of San Francisco
- Lucas Cranach the Elder, Samson and Delilah, 1529
  - Samson's Fight with the Lion, 1520–25
- Salomon de Bray, Samson with the Jawbone, 1636 Getty Museum
- Gerard de Jode, Samson Tying the Firebrands to the Foxes' Tails, ca. 1550 Fine Arts Museums of San Francisco
- Etienne Delaune, Samson Setting Fire to the Wheat of the Philistines, ca. 1575 Fine Arts Museums of San Francisco
- H.B. (John Doyle), Samson and Delilah, ca. 1800 Fine Arts Museums of San Francisco
- Gustave Doré, Death of Samson, 1865
  - Samson and Delilah, 1865
  - Samson Carrying Away the Gates of Gaza, 1865
  - Samson Destroying the Philistines, 1865
  - Samson Destroys the Temple, 1866
  - Samson Fighting with the Lion, ca. 1496
  - Samson Slaying a Lion, 1865
- Albrecht Dürer, Delilah Cuts Samson's Hair, 1493
- Josephus Farmer, Samson, 1982, Smithsonian American Art Museum
- Philip Galle, Samson Fighting the Lion, ca. 1600 Lutheran Brotherhood's Collection of Religious Art
- Giambologna, Samson Slaying a Philistine, c. 1562.
- Luca Giordano, Samson and Delilah, ca. 1675 Fine Arts Museums of San Francisco
- Guercino, Samson Captured by the Philistines
  - Samson and Delilah, 1654 (Musée des Beaux-Arts de Strasbourg)
- Reinhold Hoberg, Samson and Delilah, ca. 1900 Fine Arts Museums of San Francisco
- Lord Frederic Leighton, Illustrations for Dalziel's Bible Gallery, 1881, Tate Gallery:
  - Samson and the Lion
  - Samson Carrying the Gates
  - Samson at the Mill
- Andrea Mantegna, Samson and Delilah, ca. 1500
- Jacob Matham after Peter Paul Rubens, Samson and Delilah, 1613
- Matthaeus Merian the Elder, 1625–30, Samson and Delilah
  - Samson and the Gates
  - Samson's Strange Weapon
  - Samson Slays a Lion
- Michelangelo, Samson and Two Philistines, ca. 1530–50
- Aureliano Milani, Samson Slaying the Philistines, 1720 National Gallery, Canada
- Thomas Nast, The Modern Samson, 1868
- Erasmus Quellinus II, Samson Killing the Lion, ca. 1650 Fine Arts Museums of San Francisco
- Archie Rand, Samson, contemporary Bernice Steinbaum Gallery
- Guido Reni, The Triumph of Samson, 1611–12
- Rembrandt van Rijn, The Blinding of Samson, 1636
  - Delilah Calls the Philistines, ca. 1655
  - The Sacrifice of Menoah, 1641
  - Samson Accusing His Father-In-Law, 1635
  - Samson Betrayed by Delilah, 1629–30
  - Samson Putting Forth His Riddles at the Wedding Feast, 1638
- Kirk Richards, Delilah, 1997
- Paul Roorda, Samson, contemporary
- Peter Paul Rubens, The Death of Samson, ca. 1605 Getty Museum
  - Samson is Seized, 1609–10
- Jacob Savery I, Samson Wrestling with the Lion, (after), ca. 1595 Fine Arts Museums of San Francisco
- Hans Leonhard Schaufelein, Samson Destroying the Temple, Fifteenth to Sixteenth centuries Fine Arts Museums of San Francisco
- Solomon Joseph Solomon, Samson and Delilah, 1887 Walker Art Gallery
- Jan Steen, Samson and Delilah, 1667–70
- Matthias Stom, Samson and Delilah, 1630s
- James Tissot, 1896–1900. Christian Theological Seminary, Indianapolis, Samson Breaks His Cords
  - Samson Kills a Young Lion
  - Samson Puts Down the Pillars
  - Samson Slays a Thousand Men
- Julius Schnorr von Carolsfeld, 1851–60' World Mission Collection, The Death of Samson
  - Samson Kills the Lion
  - Samson Kills the Philistines
  - Samson is Seized
- Christiaen van Couwenbergh, The Capture of Samson, 1630
- Sir Anthony van Dyck, Samson and Delilah, 1620.
- Gerrit van Honthorst, Samson and Delilah, ca. 1615.
- Israhel van Meckenem the Younger, Samson and the Lion, ca. 1475 National Gallery of Art
- Frans van den Wyngaerde, Samson Killing the Lion, ca. 1650 Fine Arts Museums of San Francisco
- Claes Jansz Visscher the Elder, Delilah Cutting Samson's Hair, ca. 1610. Fine Arts Museums of San Francisco
- Les Drysdale, Samson, contemporary
- Jean-Michel Basquiat, Obnoxious Liberals, 1982. L. Broad Collection, Los Angeles (A painting mixing a depiction of the shorn Samson in chains with a slave auction and a contemporary art collector).
- Samson and the lion in Peterhof, Russia. A fountain celebrating the victory over Sweden in the battle of Poltava (occurred on 27 June, St Sampson's Day).

Anonymous:

- Samson Destroying the Pillars of the Philistine Temple, ca. 1600. Fine Arts Museums of San Francisco
- Display Cabinet (with figure of Delilah cutting Samson's Hair), 1620s. Getty Museum.
- The Women at the Tomb (with scene from Samson and the Lion), Unknown German, c. 1170s. Getty Museum
- Samson Destroys the Temple, Unknown German Fine Arts Museums of San Francisco

== Books and literature ==
=== Non-fiction ===
- Seymour Hersh (1991). The Samson Option: Israel's Nuclear Arsenal and American Foreign Policy. Random House.

=== Literature ===
- In the 14th century in Geoffrey Chaucer's "The Canterbury Tales", in the Monk's tale, Samson is described. His name is also used to describe the sound of a drunkard's snoring in the Pardoner's tale.
- In 1656, the Spanish crypto-Jew, Antonio Enríquez Gómez, published Sansón Nazareno: Poema heróico, a Spanish-language heroic epic version of the Samson story.
- In 1671, John Milton made him the sympathetic hero of his blank verse tragedy Samson Agonistes.
- In 1724, Moshe Chaim Luzzatto wrote the first Hebrew play ever written on the subject of Samson.
- Benjamin Franklin is credited with the witty quatrain: "Jack, eating rotten cheese, did say, / Like Samson I my thousands slay: / I vow, quoth Roger, so you do, / And with the self-same weapon too."
- In 1842, Henry Wadsworth Longfellow published his poem "The Warning", included in his Poems on Slavery, in which the poet warned Americans of a coming violent outbreak because of Slavery and compared the Black slaves with the chained Samson who pulled down the Gaza Temple.
- In 1847, Charlotte Brontë compared Rochester to Samson in Jane Eyre: "The caged eagle, whose gold-ringed eyes cruelty has extinguished, might look as looked that sightless Samson."
- In William Makepeace Thackeray's 1848 novel Vanity Fair, the characters Becky Sharp and Rawdon Crawley are compared to Samson and Delilah.
- In 1903 Paul Laurence Dunbar published the poem "Black Samson of Brandywine" about a Black soldier during the 1777 Battle of Brandywine in Lyrics of Love and Laughter.
- In 1926, Vladimir Jabotinsky published his historical novel, Samson (see "Israeli culture" above for details). The Biblical setting served Jabotinsky as a metaphor for contemporary Zionist politics and the current situation in Mandatory Palestine. The book earned Jabotinsky a credit on the 1949 Hollywood movie Samson and Delilah. 2
- In 1952, Ralph Ellison made reference to Samson in his novel Invisible Man saying, "Whoever else I was, I was no Samson. I had no desire to destroy myself even if it destroyed the machine; I wanted freedom, not destruction."
- In 1961, Joseph Heller's Catch-22 includes a character named Kid Sampson, a young, strong soldier who was cut in half by the propeller of a plane by a dare devil pilot flying too close to the beach.
- In 2006, David Grossman's novel Lion's Honey: The Myth of Samson was published.
- In 2006, David Maine published his novel The Book of Samson, the third of his Biblical series of novels which also includes Fallen and The Preservationist.
- Carol Ann Duffy's poetry anthology The World's Wife contains a poem entitled "Delilah", which sympathetically follows the eponymous character in the Biblical story.
- In 2002, Mario Ruiz and Jerry Novick published a graphic novel version called Samson: Judge of Israel through the American Bible Society.
- In 2011, Ginger Garrett published her novel, Desired: The Untold Story of Samson and Delilah, which tells the story of Samson from the perspective of the three main women in his life: his mother, his wife, and Delilah.
- In 2012, Justin Reed published a graphic novel, "Samson: Blessed Savior of Israel," which draws from a wide range of resources in previous scholarship and literature on Samson to create a fresh perspective on the Samson story.

=== Comics ===
- In 1961, the biblical Samson appeared in a DC Comics "imaginary story" in Action Comics #279, briefly marrying Superman's childhood friend Lana Lang. In 2005, a character based on Samson also made an appearance in Grant Morrison's All-Star Superman alongside Atlas.
- In 1971 the Marvel Comics character Doc Samson (born Leonard "Leo" Samson) debuted in The Incredible Hulk. He is a psychiatrist who is exposed to gamma radiation that causes his hair to grow long and green. Also, like the real Samson, his strength depends on the length of his hair.
- In the Image comics series Invincible an African-American character with great strength is named Black Samson.

== Film ==
The most detailed film version of the Biblical Samson was the 1949 Cecil B. deMille film Samson and Delilah, starring Victor Mature as Samson. Two made-for-TV films, in 1984 and 1996, retold the story of Samson and Delilah. Another film, Samson, was made in 2018.

The Samson character was featured in a series of five sword-and-sandal adventure films made in Italy in the 1960s, as follows:

- Samson (Italian title Sansone) (1961) portrayed by Brad Harris
- Samson vs. The Pirates (1963) a/k/a Samson and the Sea Beast
- Samson Challenges Hercules (1963) a/k/a Hercules, Samson and Ulysses
- Samson vs. the Black Pirate (1963) a/k/a Hercules and the Black Pirate
- Samson and His Mighty Challenge (1965) a semi comedy/satire co-starring Hercules, Ursus & Maciste

Other films based on the story of Samson and Delilah include:

- Aurat (1953), Indian film adaptation of the Biblical tale by B. Verma, starring Premnath and Bina Rai in the lead roles.
- Samson (1964), Indian action-adventure film by Nanabhai Bhatt where the hero is portrayed by Dara Singh.
- Aaj Ka Samson (1991), adaptation of the story set in modern-day India, starring Hemant Birje as Samson.

The 2025 film 28 Years Later and its 2026 sequel The Bone Temple feature an 'Alpha' infected, capable of superhuman strength as a result of mutations by the virus in the setting. Another character names him Samson as a reference to the Biblical figure.

== Music ==
=== Classical ===
- Samson was an opera by Jean-Philippe Rameau with a libretto by Voltaire. It was never staged for censorship reasons and the music is now lost.
- Samson, an oratorio by George Frideric Handel premiered in 1743.
- Samson et Dalila, an opera by Camille Saint-Saëns premiered in 1877.
- In 1977, Joseph Horovitz wrote Samson for baritone, mixed choir and brass band
- The Warrior, an opera by Bernard Rogers and Norman Corwin that premiered at the Metropolitan Opera in 1947.

=== Other music ===
Blind Willie Johnson – "If I Had My Way / I'd Tear the Building Down" (recorded 1927), the lyrics relate to Samson's marriage to Delilah and his slaying of the lion, often covered as "Samson and Delilah"

Louis Jordan – Ain't That Just Like a Woman (1946): "Samson thought Delilah was on the square, Till one night she clipped him all his hair"

In 1965, Bob Dylan wrote "Tombstone Blues" in which he makes a reference to Samson in the lines "I wish I could give Brother Bill his great thrill/and set him in chains on top of the hill/Then send out for some pillars and Cecil B. DeMille." The second and third lines are references to Samson's death, while Cecil B. Demille is the director who made the movie depicting the Samson story.

Michael Hurd's pop cantata "Swingin' Samson" (1973) is a toned-down children's musical version of the story.

British rock band Procol Harum has a song called "As Strong as Samson" on their album "Exotic Birds and Fruits" from 1974.

Samson (referred to as 'Sam' and 'Sammy') and Delilah are among the couples mentioned in B.A. Robertson's 1979 song on the pitfalls of love, Bang Bang.

Bad Manners have a song called "Samson And Delilah" that is available in a single version and in a longer "Biblical Version" on the album "Forging Ahead" from 1982.

Mark Alburger's opera-oratorio, Samson and Delilah (The Frank Judges), dates from 1998, with an updated short version, "Sex and Delilah" written for and performed by San Francisco Cabaret opera in May 2009.

Drone/Experimental band Earth (American band) released an album in 2008 entitled The Bees Made Honey in the Lion's Skull, a reference to Samson's riddle. Although instrumental, the album explores the theme of beauty arising from rot and decay.

Heads Held High, (a melodic hardcore band from Cleveland, Ohio), has a song titled "Samson Gets a Haircut" on their 2008 release, So Say We All.

Samson's interactions with Delilah are referenced in the Moses Hogan piece "Witness," at which point Hogan describes Delilah's cutting of Samson's hair and Samson's reaction towards the Philistines

Freddie Mercury, the former lead singer and pianist of Queen, wrote a song called "My Fairy King" (from their debut album) that has the lyric "dragons fly like sparrows through the air/and baby lambs where Samson dares".

The song "Rastaman Live Up" on Bob Marley's posthumously released album Confrontation, contains the lyrics "Samson slew the Philistines, with a donkey jawbone".

The Grateful Dead played the song "Samson & Delilah" from the mid-1970s and throughout their career. The song is a traditional song, cataloged by Alan Lomax in his encyclopedic "Folk Songs of North America" which Bob Weir learned from Reverend Gary Davis. Dave Van Ronk also sings the song on his "Folksinger" album. The lyrics cover some parts of Samson's history, notably his fight with the lion. Shirley Manson of Garbage fame recently recorded a cover of "Samson & Delilah" for the TV show "Terminator: The Sarah Connor Chronicles" Season Two premiere episode which is also called "Samson & Delilah".

Indie-rock artist Boy in a Jar has a song called "Six Thieves" that heavily references the story of Samson.

The album Birds of Prey by Godley and Creme features a song "Samson" with references to Delilah.

The song "My Defenses Are Down" from the musical Annie Get Your Gun contains the line, "Like Samson, without his hair".

The Pixies' song "Gouge Away" is based on Samson's story.

Leonard Cohen wrote the song "Hallelujah" which makes references to Samson and Delilah. A later album, Popular Problems contains the song 'Samson in New Orleans', which contains the lines "Stand me by those pillars/Let me take this temple down".

The Cranberries have a song called "Delilah" written from the perspective of a woman fighting off a conniving temptress.

Mandy Moore and Jonathon Foreman (from Switchfoot) have a song called "Someday We'll Know" for the movie A Walk To Remember with references to Samson and Delilah in the chorus.

Bishop Allen released a song called "Empire City" that references Samson with the lines: "Samson suffered the same fame fate, powerless and losing his hair."

New Radicals made a song called "Someday We'll Know" which referenced Samson and Delilah.

Eric "Monty" Morris, vocalist of The Skatalites, made a song called "Strongman Samson" with clear references to the biblical story. Samson is hereby portrayed as "the strongest of men" hero, although all his strength is taken from a woman. Saying that "it's so clear to understand", Morris suggests that women always had such a power over men.

Regina Spektor has a song called "Samson". The song is told from the point of view of his first wife, telling an alternate version of Samson's story in which she cuts his hair and he never kills any Philistine, therefore ending up not being mentioned by the Bible.

Indie-rock band mewithoutYou references the story of Samson twice in the song "In a Market Dimly Lit" from the album Brother, Sister. In the first chorus, the lyrics read, "I'm a donkey's jaw," referencing the weapon used by Samson to slay a thousand Philistines. In the second chorus, singer Aaron Weiss proclaims, "If I was Samson, I'd have found that harlot's blade and cut my own hair short."

Samson is a recurring subject in songs by Christian parody band ApologetiX, being the subject of "Enter Samson" (a parody of "Enter Sandman" by Metallica), "Play Fair Delilah" (a parody of "Hey There Delilah" by Plain White T's), I Know a Riddle" (a parody of "I Know a Little" by Lynyrd Skynyrd), "Someone Shaved My Locks Tonight" (a parody of "Someone Saved My Life Tonight" by Elton John), "Clip It" [one of two parodies (the other being "Wicked") of "Whip It" by Devo], and "You Just Might Need Kung Fu" (a parody of "You Make My Dreams" by Daryl Hall and John Oates).

Big Daddy Kane references Samson in his song "Ain't No Half Steeppin'."

Deathwish Of Samson is a new metalcore band hailing from the Niagara region of Ontario, Canada.

The song "En Hakkore" by Christian thrash metal band Tourniquet (band) is about the story of Sampson, En Hakkore being the name of the spring that burst forth in answer to his final prayer.

Neil Sedaka recorded the song "Run, Samson, Run" which is based upon the Biblical account. He refers to Delilah as "a cheatin' gal who brought him tragedy" and advises Samson to run from her. At the end of the song, he advises all guys that "there's a little of Delilah in each and every gal."

Alternative singer PJ Harvey mentions the story of Samson and Delilah in her song "Hair."

The Arctic Monkeys music video Black Treacle is a take on the story of Samson and the lion.

Christian comedian Tim Hawkins wrote a parody of the Plain White-T's song "Hey There, Delilah" based on the story of Samson and Delilah.

Bruce Springsteen wrote a song called "Fire" which makes reference to Samson and Delilah.

R&B singer-songwriter Frank Ocean refers to Samson in his song "Pyramids," with the line "I found you laying down with Samson and his full head of hair."

Florence Welch refers to the biblical story of Samson and Delilah in the Florence + The Machine song "Delilah", with lines like "As I pull the pillars down" or "why can't you let me know?" referring to Delilah asking Samson for the secret of his strength. In the music video of the song, an empowered Welch is seen cutting the hair off to an unknown lover.

== Commerce and industry ==
=== Commerce ===
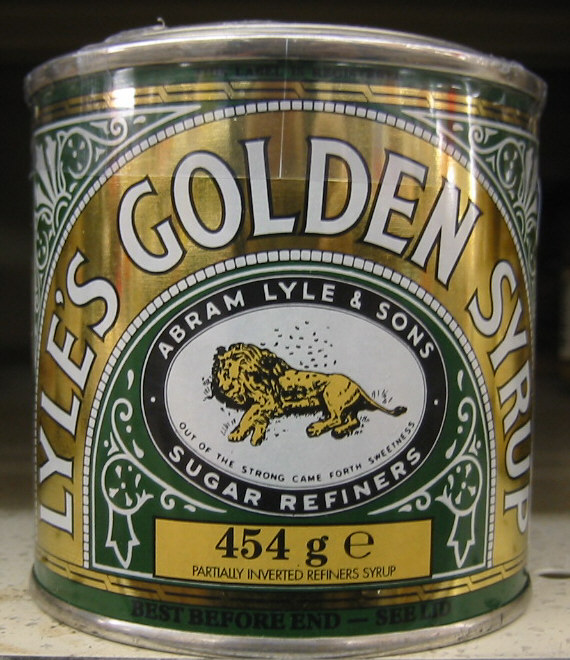
A tin of Lyle's Golden Syrup

Lyle's Golden Syrup has a picture of bees in the lion which Samson had killed, with Samson's riddle Out of the strong came forth sweetness.

=== Architecture ===
The famous Harland & Wolff cranes in Belfast are known as Samson and Goliath (cranes) respectively.

== Television ==
In a 1967 Lost in Space episode, "Collision of Planets," Dr. Smith gains Samson-like strength dependent on his new head of green hair.

The story of Samson is parodied in the Pinky and the Brain episode "A Little Off the Top." In this story, the Brain attempts to learn the source of Samson's strength, so that he may acquire it and use it to take over the world. The version of Samson that appears here is based on Victor Mature's performance in the film Samson and Delilah.

One of the main characters of the animated series The Venture Bros. is named Brock Samson. Like the Biblical hero, he has long flowing hair and incredible strength, as well a short, violent temper. He also is capable of unarmed combat with wild animals, like the Biblical Samson who fought a lion. He also engages in romantic relationships with morally ambiguous women. However, his strength seems to have no relation to his hair; indeed, he cuts it off himself at one point to lay a trap for hitman pursuing him, with no ill effects. In the episode "Pomp and Circuitry", a direct reference to the biblical story of Samson is made. However, the person referred to as "...that Jewish guy who lost all his powers when they cut his hair off" is not the presumed biblical Samson (or jokingly Brock Samson), but rather Lenny Kravitz.

In the proposed Gargoyles spin-off series Gargoyles 2198, the lead character was named Samson. Like his ancestor, Goliath, he was strong and chosen for a leadership role at a young age. He leads a small group of gargoyles and humans in a resistance against an alien threat that has invaded the Earth. Little else is known of his character or similarities to his Biblical counterpart, as the series never came to fruition.

The first episode of Donkey Kong Country, titled "Bad Hair Day", contains explicit references to the Samson story. King K. Rool curses Donkey Kong to remove his strength, which he achieves by cutting Donkey Kong's hair. Donkey Kong's strength is only restored when his hair grows back.

== Video games ==
Samson is a playable character in The Binding of Isaac, first being introduced in the Wrath of the Lamb expansion, as well as the game's 2014 remake, The Binding of Isaac: Rebirth. The Repentance DLC for Rebirth adds "tainted" versions of characters, who have their own unique mechanics. Tainted Samson appears with his hair mostly shaved off, and starts with the item "Berserk!", which when activated grows the character's hair, switches the method of attack to the use of a donkey's jawbone, and makes him temporarily immortal.

Samson appears as a Berserker-class Servant in the 2023 video game Fate/Samurai Remnant.

== Military and militant references to Samson ==
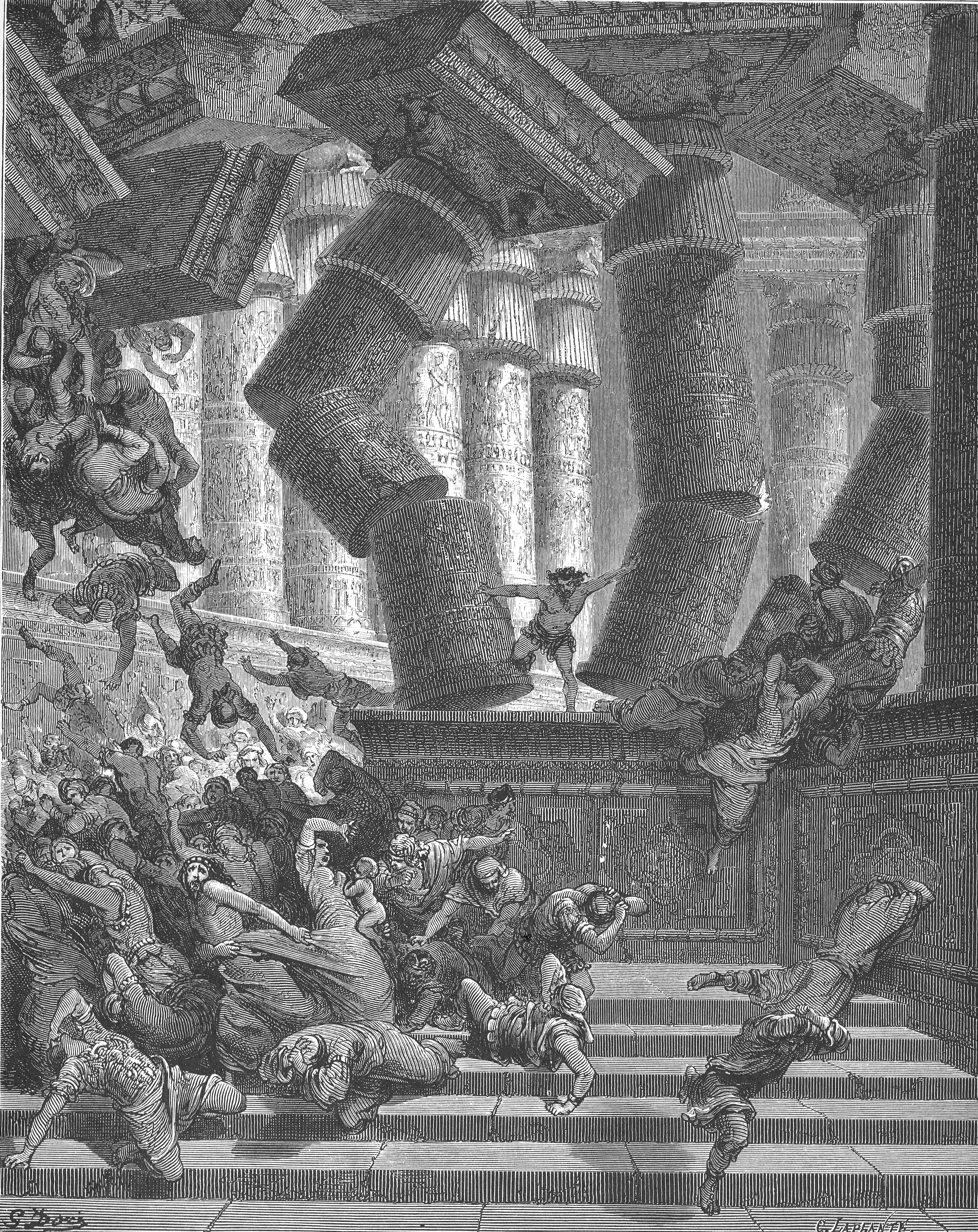
Illustration of Samson by Gustave Doré, the illustrator of the Bible that was handed to a British prison guard, on 21 April 1947, by an Irgun militant who blew himself up moments later.

=== Discussions of suicide attacks ===
The story of Samson's destruction of the temple and suicide in the Book of Judges in the Hebrew Bible is sometimes described as the first suicide attack. The phrase he says as he dies is usually translated to English as "Let me die with the Philistines" (Hebrew: תמות נפשי עם פלשתים). In Arabic the expression is phrased differently, as roughly “Against me and my enemies, O Lord!” (Arabic: عليّ وعلى أعدائي يا رب).

The story of Samson, as told in Samson Agonistes, was one of the examples of "Suicide bombers in Western literature" included in a study by Japanese-born German academic Arata Takeda. Takeda's article was published by Contemporary Justice Review. Takeda's other examples were Ajax, The Robbers, and The Just Assassins. He also covered the same concept in his thesis for doctorate from the University of Tübingen. His conclusion that "suicide bombings are not the expressions of specific cultural peculiarities or exclusively religious fanaticisms. Instead, they represent a strategic option of the desperately weak who strategically disguise themselves under the mask of apparent strength, terror, and invincibility".

The Lehi militant group used the Biblical story of Samson's death (Judges 16) in discussions about suicide attacks. In a meeting about ways to assassinate General Evelyn Barker, the British Army commander in Mandatory Palestine, a young woman volunteered to do the assassination as a suicide bombing. They refer to it as a "Let my soul die with the Philistines" proposal (Hebrew: תמות נפשי עם פלשתים) as a reference to the words of Samson in (Judges 16:30), or a "Samson option". On that occasion other members of the group allegedly rejected her offer. She also had a physical disability that might have made her unable to carry out the plan the group had in mind. The Lehi memorialize her among their martyrs and fallen combatants (Hebrew: הללי לח"י), but her cause of death is not described.
