= Benoît Audran the Elder =

French engraver (1661–1721)

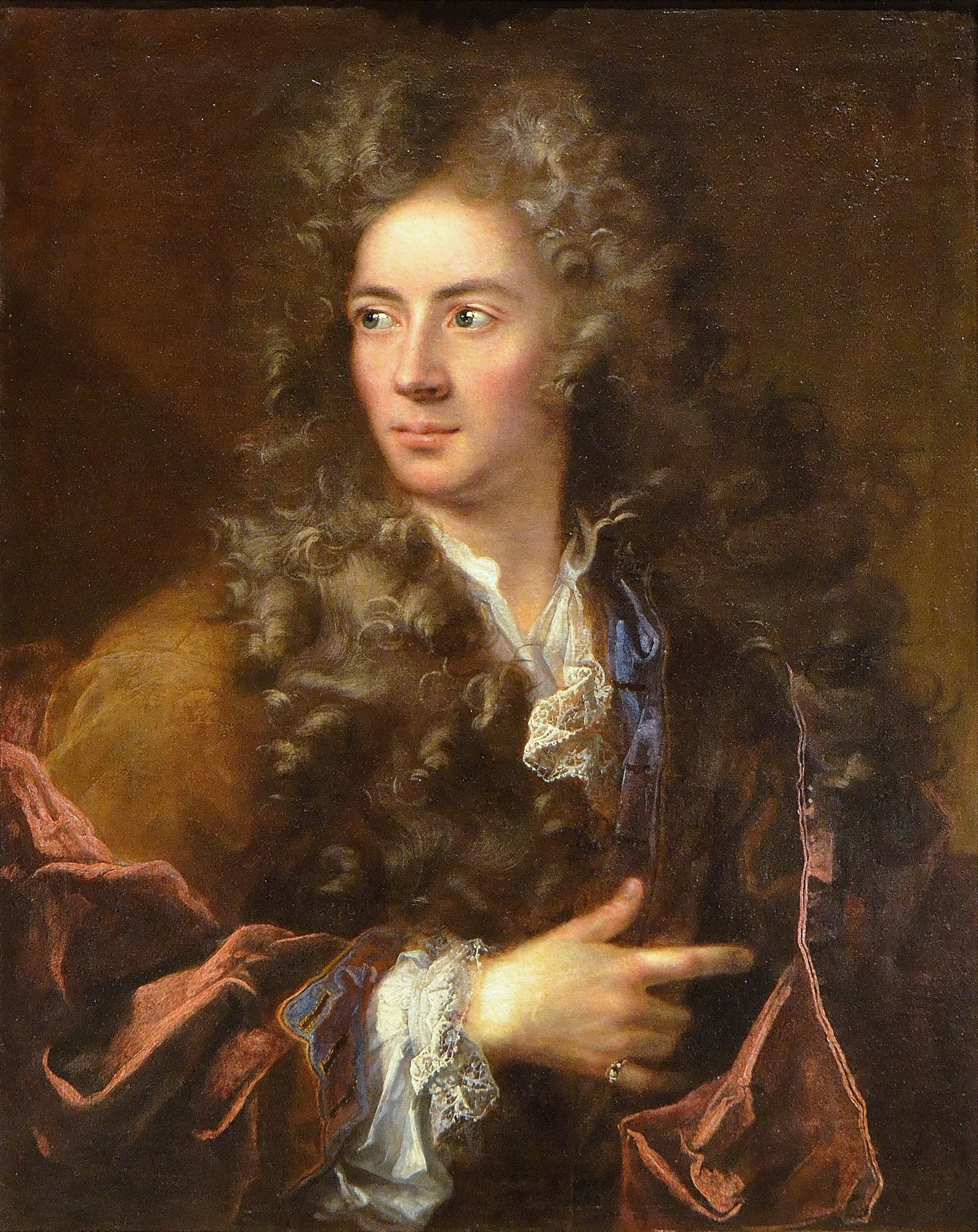
Portrait by the workshop of Joseph Vivien

Benoît Audran the Elder (23 November 1661 – 3 September 1721) was a French engraver.

The second son of Germain Audran, he was born at Lyons. He received his first instruction in the art of engraving from his father; but had afterwards the advantage of studying under his uncle, the celebrated Gérard Audran. Although he never equalled the admirable style of his uncle, he engraved many plates of historical subjects and portraits, which have justly established his reputation. His style, like that of Gérard, is bold and clear; his drawing of the figure is very correct; and there is a fine expression of character in his heads. He was received into the Academy in 1709, and was appointed engraver to the king, with a pension. He died in 1721, in the village of Ouzouer, near Sens. His portrait, after J. Vivien, has been engraved by his nephew Benoit, the younger. The following are his principal plates:

== Portraits ==
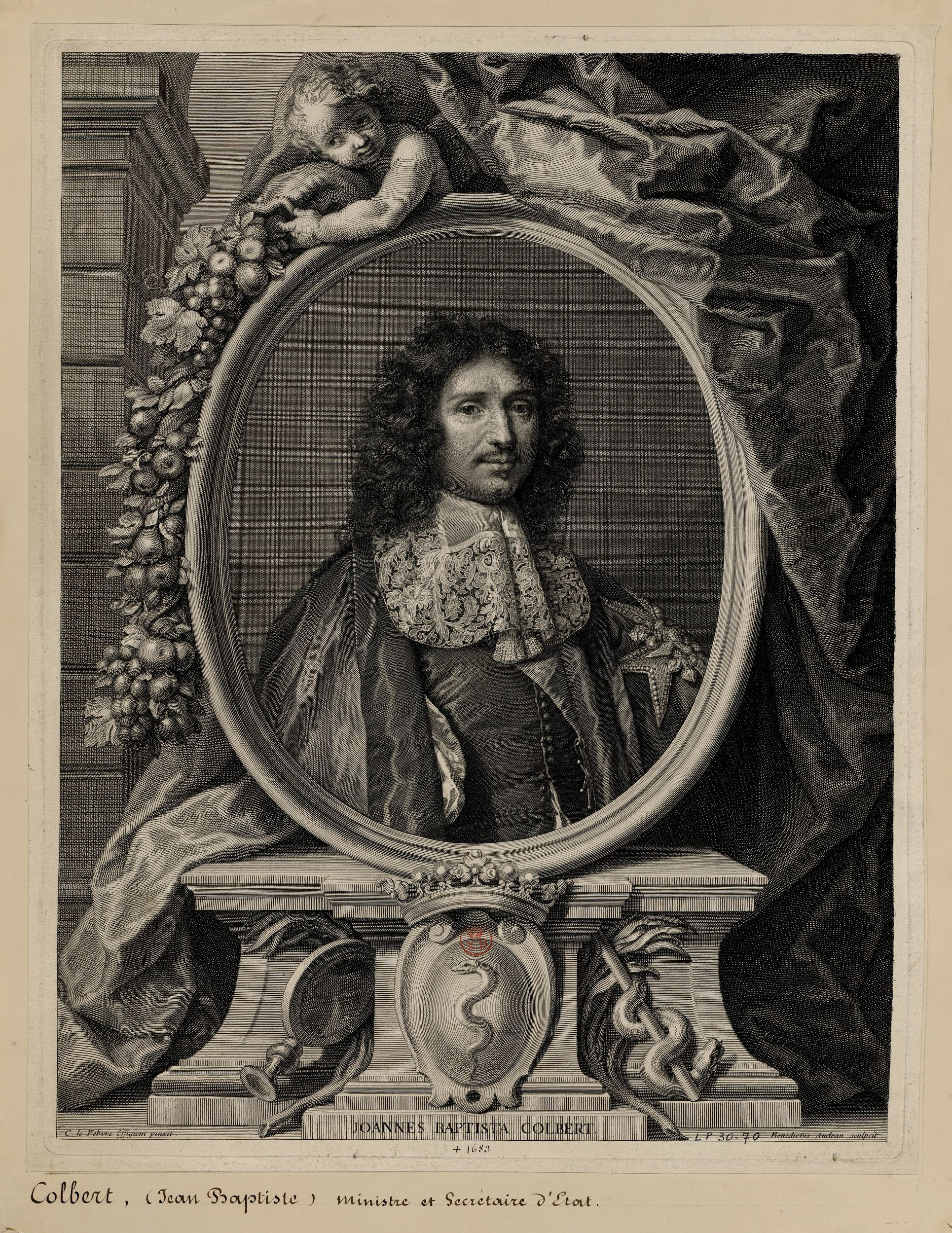
Portrait of Jean-Baptiste Colbert (1619-1683) by Benoît Audran the Elder, Palace of Versailles Research Centre, 1676

- Charles le Goux de la Berchere, Archbishop of Narbonne; after L. de Boulogne.
- Jean Baptiste Colbert; after C. Lefebvre; oval.
- Joseph Clement of Bavaria, Elector - Archbishop of Cologne; after J. Vivien.
- Henri de Beringhen; after Nanteuil. 1710.
- Samuel Frisching, General of the Swiss: after J. Huber. 1713.
- J. F. A. Willading; after J. Huber. 1718.
- Equestrian Statue of Louis XIV; after Desjardins; by B. and J. Audran.

== Subjects after various masters ==
- The Baptism of Jesus Christ; after Albani.
- David with the Head of Goliath; after a picture in the Louvre, formerly attributed to Michelangelo, but now ascribed to Daniele da Volterra; two plates, engraved in 1716 and 1717.
- Moses defending the Daughters of Jethro; after Le Brun.
- The Espousals of Moses and Zipporah; after the same.
- The Elevation of the Cross; after the same. 1706.
- The Descent from the Cross; after the same.
- An allegorical subject — Holland accepting Peace; after the same.
- Zephyrus and Flora; after Ant. Coypel.
- The Pleasures of the Garden; two friezes; after Mignard; engraved by Benoit and Jean Audran.
- The Saviour with Martha and Mary; after Le Sueur.
- St. Paul preaching at Ephesus; after the same.
- Alexander drinking the Cup which his Physician presents him; after the same.
- The Accouchement of Marie de Medicis; after Rubens.
- The Exchange of the Two Queens; after the same. [The two last form part of the Luxembourg Gallery.]

Several other prints by this artist are specified in the ' Dictionnaire des Artistes,' by Heineken, and in Meyer's ' Allgemeines Künstler-Lexikon' upwards of two hundred are enumerated.
