= Fontaines-sur-Saône =

Fontaines-sur-Saône Fontanes (Arpitan)
- Commune
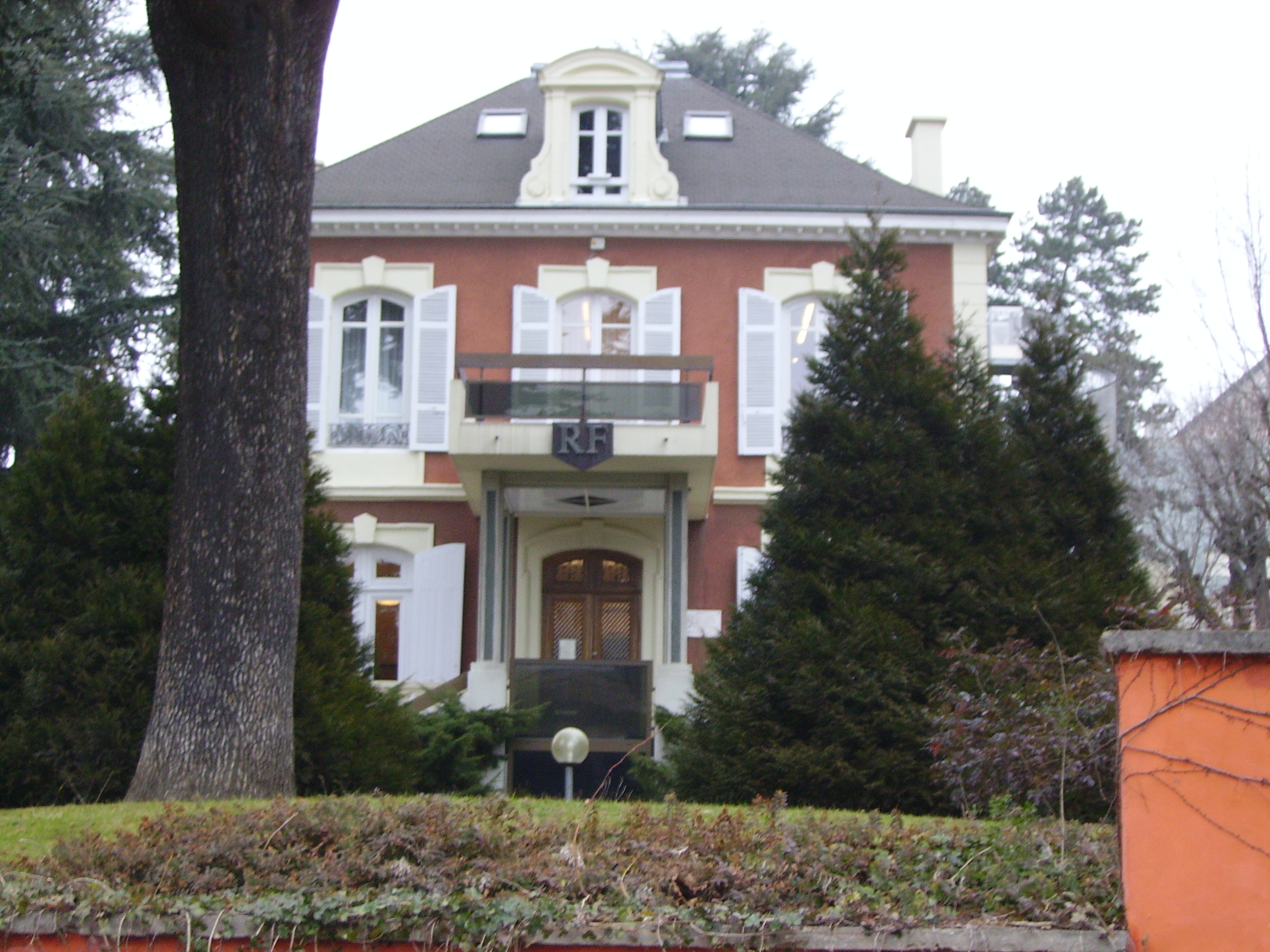
- Fontaines-sur-Saône Town Hall in 2006

- Coat of arms
- Location of Fontaines-sur-Saône
- Location within France Location within Auvergne-Rhône-Alpes
- Coordinates: 45°50′10″N 4°50′42″E
- Country: France
- Region: Auvergne-Rhône-Alpes
- Metropolis: Lyon Metropolis
- Arrondissement: Lyon

Government
  - Mayor (2020–2026): Thierry Pouzol
- Area^{1}: 2.32 km^{2} (0.90 sq mi)
- Elevation: 170 m (560 ft)
- Highest elevation: 270 m (890 ft)
- Lowest elevation: 166 m (545 ft)
- Population (2023): 6,957
  - Density: 3,000/km^{2} (7,770/sq mi)
- Demonym: Fontainois
- Time zone: UTC+01:00 (CET)
  - Summer (DST): UTC+02:00 (CEST)
- INSEE/Postal code: 69088 /69270
- Website: www.fontaines-sur-saone.fr
- ^{1} French Land Register data, which excludes lakes, ponds, glaciers > 1 km^{2} (0.386 sq mi or 247 acres) and river estuaries.

Fontaines-sur-Saône (French pronunciation: [fɔ̃tɛn syʁ son], lit. 'Fontaines on Saône'; Arpitan: Fontanes) is a commune in the Metropolis of Lyon in the Auvergne-Rhône-Alpes region in central-eastern France. It is located on the left bank of the Saône, also comprising roughly the northern half of Île Roy (Roy Island), the southern part being part of Collonges-au-Mont-d'Or.

The 19th-century playwright Antony Rénal died in Fontaines-sur-Saône on 2 October 1866.

== Demographics ==
Historical population
Year	Pop.	±% p.a.
1968	5,313	—
1975	6,276	+2.41%
1982	7,062	+1.70%
1990	6,760	−0.54%
1999	6,721	−0.06%
2007	6,310	−0.79%
2012	6,295	−0.05%
2017	7,069	+2.35%
2023	6,957	−0.27%
Source: INSEE
