= Paul Roorda =

Canadian visual artist

- Born: Waterloo, Ontario
- Movement: Conceptual art, mixed media
- Website: www.paulroorda.com

Paul Roorda is a Canadian visual artist.

== Background ==
Working with funds awarded from the Ontario Arts Council and the Canada Council for the Arts, Roorda has exhibited widely in Canada, the United States, and Germany. As an Ontario-based artist, Roorda has exhibited most frequently in the cities of Waterloo, Toronto, and Ottawa. Paul Roorda's work has often employed found materials to make two-dimensional works of art, sculptures, and outdoor installations. Roorda's work has also explored themes of climate change, spirituality, nostalgia and the passage of time as well as connections between science, religion, and medicine.

== Major shows ==
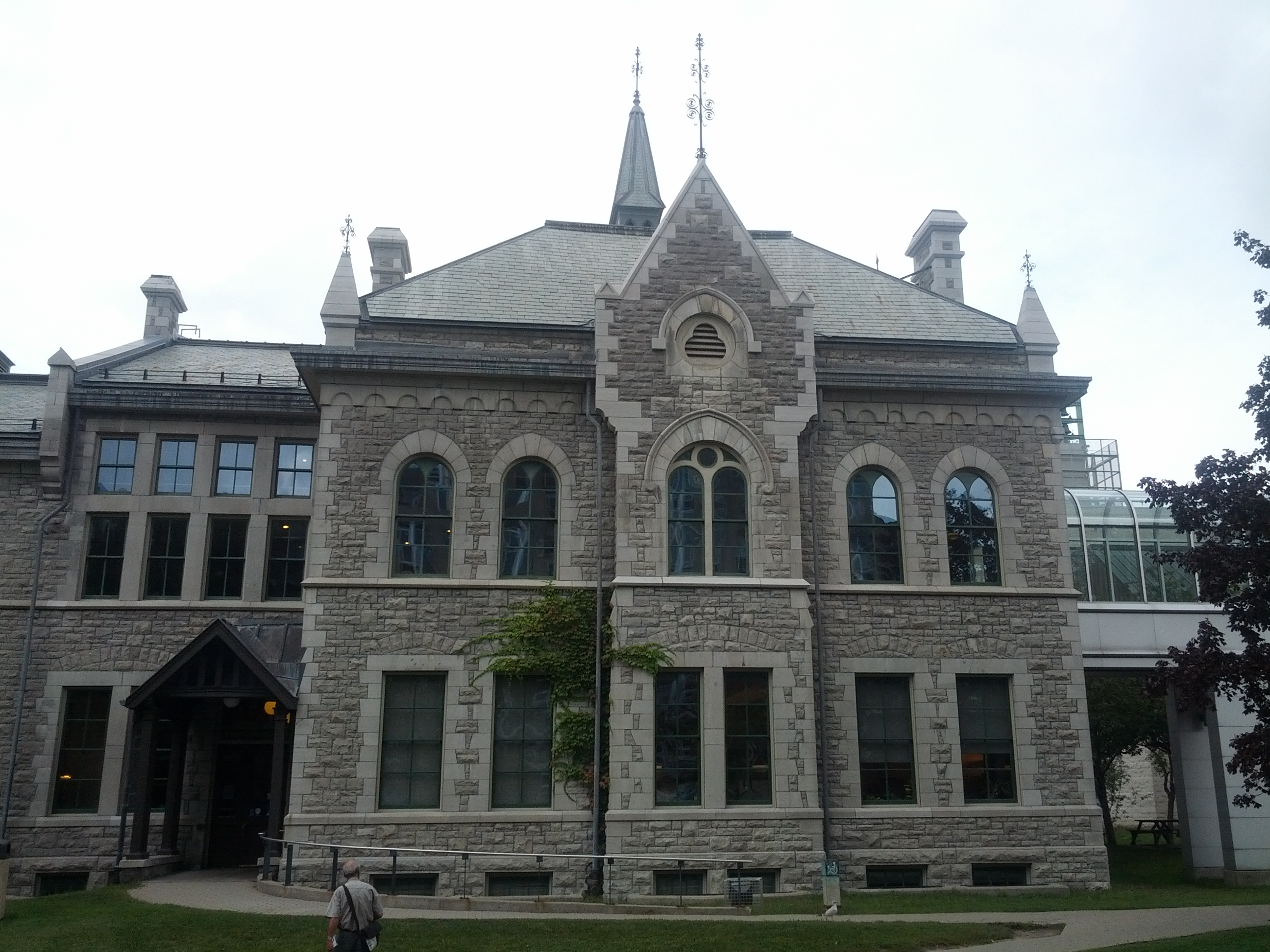
Ottawa City Hall featured a major Paul Roorda exhibit in 2011

In 2005, Roorda was the subject of an episode of "The Artist's Life" on Bravo Television. In 2011, Roorda's work was exhibited at Ottawa City Hall. Roorda has served as a municipal Artist in Residence on three occasions and in two different cities: first in Kitchener, Ontario in 2007 and twice at GlogauAIR Berlin in 2012 and 2015.

== Awards ==
Roorda received funding from the Canada Council for the Arts and the Ontario Arts Council.

== See also ==
- Christian art
- Christian symbolism
- Crucifixion in the arts
- Cultural references to Samson
- Depiction of Jesus
