= Marius-Pierre Audran =

French operatic tenor

- Born: 26 September 1816; Aix-en-Provence, France
- Died: 9 January 1887 (aged 70); Marseille, France
- Occupation: Tenor
- Children: Edmond Audran

Marius-Pierre Audran (28 September 1816 – 9 January 1887) was a French operatic tenor. He performed at the Opéra-Comique in Paris as the first tenor. His son was acclaimed composer Edmond Audran.

== Works ==
=== Author ===
- La Colombe du soldat (romance) (1851)
- Vous pleurez d'être heureux (romance) (1853)
- Le guide des montagnes (romance dramatique) (1854)
- Veillez sur mon enfant (pray), (1855)
- Prière à la Vierge (1867)
- La mère chrétienne (lullaby) (1870)

=== Coauthor ===
- Le Soir à la Veillée, with Antony Rénal (1843)
- Le Chant du sabotier, with J. P. Schmit (1851)
- Le mot le plus doux (rêverie), with Sylvain Saint-Étienne (1851)
- N'écoute pas les fleurs (romance), with Armand de Lagniau (1851)
- Aimons-nous Mariette (romance), with A. T. Brulon (1852)
- L'Amour s'en va Coumo Ven (romanso nouvello), in provençal, with Marius Bourelly (1853)
- Belange des nuits (Sérénade), with Q. Rénal (1853)
- L'Enfant et l'oiseau (mélodie), with Alexandre St Étienne (1853)
- La Bergeronnette (romance), with Marius Bourrely (1854)
- Mon cœur jalouse (mélodie), with Adolphe Catelin (1854)
- L'Amandier fleuri (mélodie), with J. B. gant (1855)
- Le Vieux vagabond (romance), with Pierre-Jean de Béranger (1855)
- Mon étau (mélodie dramatique), with A. Clesse (1856)
- Jane, pourquoi pleurer ? (romance), with Marius Bourrelly (1860)
- Les 3 moulins (simple histoire), with A. Joubert (1860)
- L'Œuf de Pâques (historiette), with A. Joubert (1865)
- Mélodie du soir (sérénade), with Sylvain Saint-Étienne (1867)
- Au coin du feu (Souvenir d'autrefois), with A. Joubert (1875)
- Lei Mouro (Les mores) (aubade), in provençal and french, with J. Y. Gaut (1877)
- L'Enfant et la rose (romance), with Ch. Chaubet (1878)
- Je pleure encore (romance), with Pierre Lachambeaudie
