= Antony Rénal =

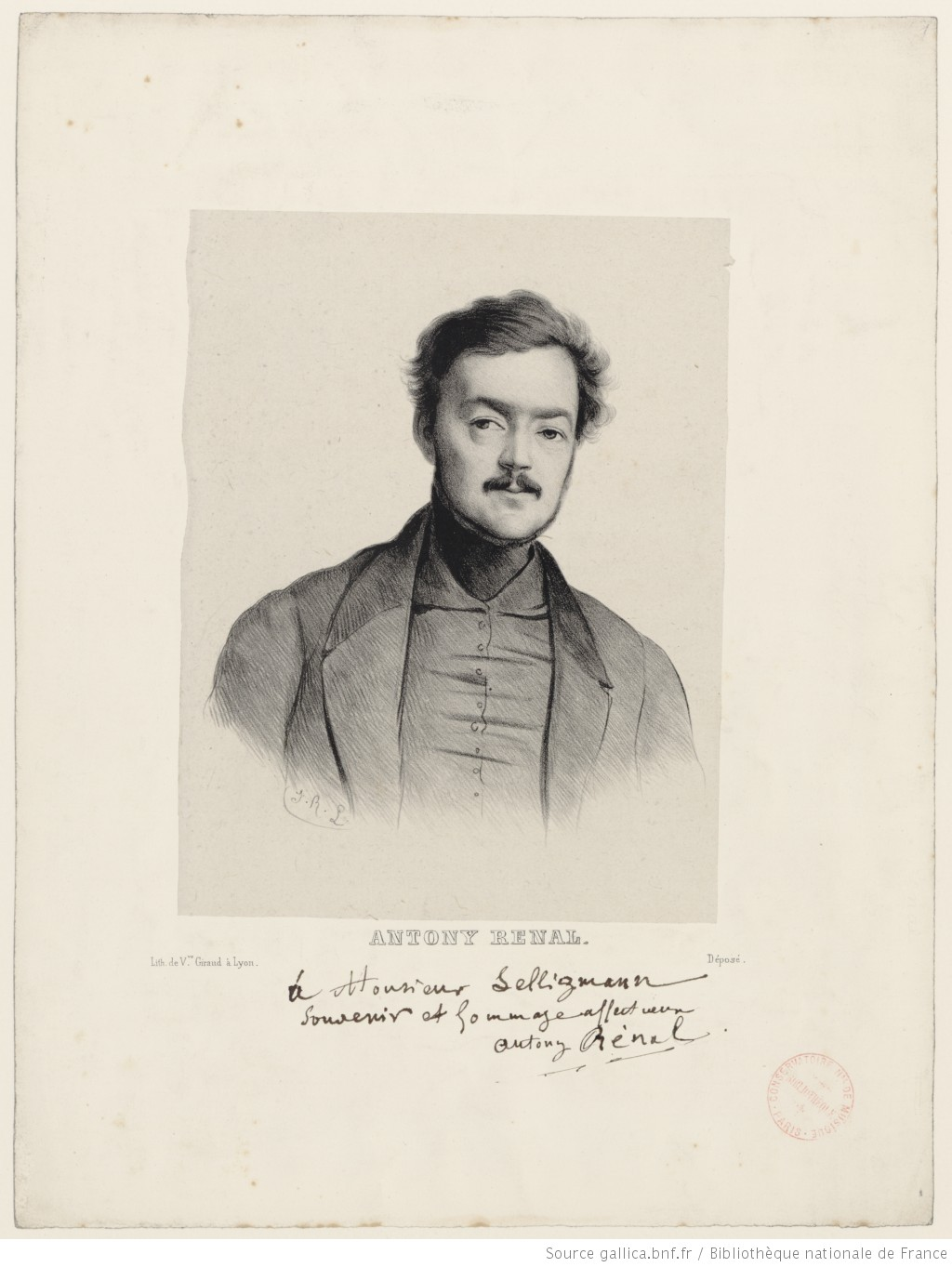
A lithograph of Rénal signed "J.R.L."

Claudius Billiet, better known under the pseudonym Antony Rénal (26 April 1805 in Lyon – 2 October 1866 in Fontaines-sur-Saône) was a French writer, poet, songwriter and playwright.

== Life ==
A trader and music teacher in Lyon where he was born, member of the board of directors of the Dépot de mendicité of the city of Lyon (1832), Rénal collaborated with the Caveau lyonnais (1829) and became known that year through poems. He became a literary critic at the Moniteur judiciaire where he published under his real name

== Works ==
- Stances sur la mort du général Foy, Brunet, 1825
- Chansons et romances, Brissot-Thivars, 1829
- Nouveaux Mélanges, discours, anecdotes, poésies, Bouland, 1829
- Nouvelles esquisses poétiques, 1832
- Emany, novel, épisode de la Restauration, H. Souverain, 1837
- La Robe rouge, 2 vol, H. Souverain, 1839
- Le Giaour, Grand Opera in 3 acts, with Louis Tavernier, music by Jules Bovéry, 1839
- Lectures en famille, ou les Soirées d'hiver, récits amusants, P.-C. Lehuby, 1843
- Le Soir à la Veillée, with Marius-Pierre Audran, 1843
- Les Veillées des jeunes enfants, Cosnier and Lachèse, 1844
- Le Berquin du hameau, ou le Conteur des bords du Rhône, scènes historiques, esquisses biographiques et récits tirés de notre histoire ancienne et moderne, 1846
- Les illustrations littéraires de l'Espagne, biographie outlines, 1849
- Jacques Juiltard, pièce de vers, 1850
- Les Encouragements du premier âge, ou Historiettes instructives et amusantes, P.-C. Lehuby, 1851
- Les Pompiers de Fontaines, Rey-Sézanne, 1851
- Coup d’œil sur le mouvement littéraire et artistique au midi de la France, premières années du XIXe siècle, H. Souverain, 1853
- Les Enfants de Fontaine, ou la Saint-Louis, Perrin, 1853
- Joies et plaintes, poésies nouvelles, Arnault de Vresse, 1856
- Critiques littéraires, nouvelles et feuilletons au gré de la plume, Duperret, 1859

== Bibliography ==
- Joseph-Marie Quérard, Les Écrivains pseudonymes et autres mystificateurs de la littérature, 1854, p. 36
- Aimé Vingtrinier, Note sur deux pamphlets anonymes parus à Lyon sous la Restauration, 1903, p. 13
- Robert Sabatier, Histoire de la poésie française - Poésie du XIXe siècle, 1977, p. 25
