= Montignac-Lascaux =

- Commune
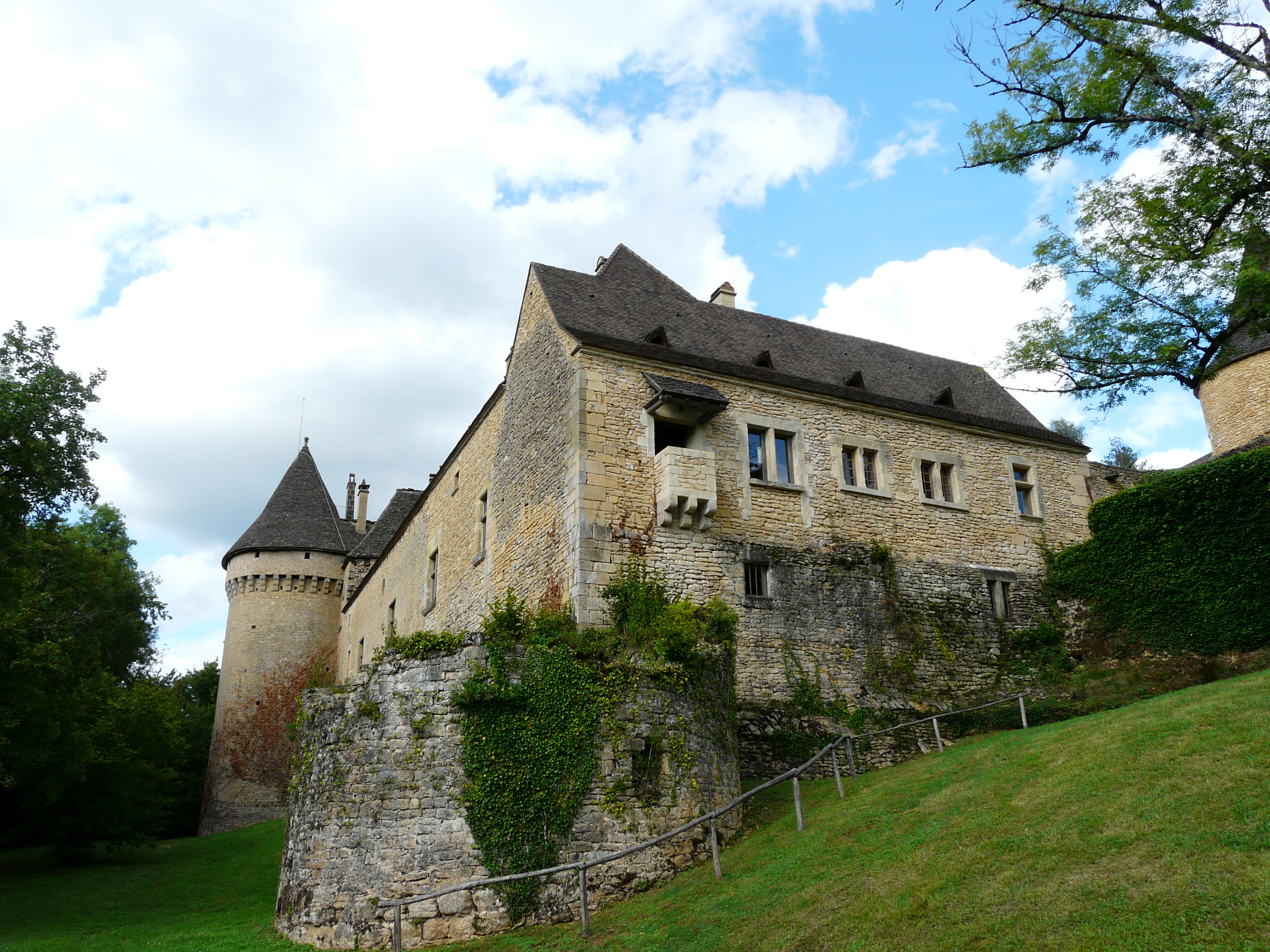
- Chateau of Coulonges

- Coat of arms
- Location of Montignac-Lascaux
- Location within France Location within Nouvelle-Aquitaine
- Coordinates: 45°04′03″N 1°09′44″E
- Country: France
- Region: Nouvelle-Aquitaine
- Department: Dordogne
- Arrondissement: Sarlat-la-Canéda
- Canton: Vallée de l'Homme

Government
  - Mayor (2020–2026): Laurent Mathieu
- Area^{1}: 37.15 km^{2} (14.34 sq mi)
- Elevation: 77 m (253 ft)
- Highest elevation: 273 m (896 ft)
- Lowest elevation: 73 m (240 ft)
- Population (2023): 2,762
  - Density: 74.35/km^{2} (192.6/sq mi)
- Time zone: UTC+01:00 (CET)
  - Summer (DST): UTC+02:00 (CEST)
- INSEE/Postal code: 24291 /24290
- ^{1} French Land Register data, which excludes lakes, ponds, glaciers > 1 km^{2} (0.386 sq mi or 247 acres) and river estuaries.

Montignac-Lascaux (French pronunciation: [mɔ̃tiɲak lasko]; Limousin: Montinhac or Montinhac de Las Caus; before 2020: Montignac, also called Montignac-sur-Vézère), is a commune in the Dordogne department, Nouvelle-Aquitaine, Southwestern France. It is a small town situated on the Vézère river and has been the capital of the canton of Montignac since 1790. In 2015 it became the capital of the newly created Canton de la Vallée de l'Homme. The poet Pierre Lachambeaudie (1806–1872) was born in the village.

== Geography ==
Montignac-Lascaux is a commune and small town in the department of Dordogne. It is situated in the historic region of Périgord Noir, just below the confluence of the River Vézère and the Laurence, a small river which rises near the town of Thenon. Montignac-Lascaux is 11 km (7 mi) southeast of Thenon, 13 km (8 mi) southwest of Terrasson-Lavilledieu, and 19 km (12 mi) north of Sarlat-la-Canéda. The D704 district road from Brive-la-Gaillarde passes through the town where it intersects with the D65, D704e and D706. The area of the commune is 3,715 hectares. The highest point is in the northwest and the lowest point in the southwest where the Vézère leaves the commune.

== History ==
Human presence was evident in Montignac-Lascaux from the Paleolithic period. The city had within its location, the prehistoric site of Lascaux and the deposit at Le Regourdou (Neanderthal man). The city's history begins with Roman colonization. Two villas are evident: The Villa des Olivoux (at Chambon in the north of Montignac) and the villa of Brenac.

In medieval times, the city had an important fortress. From the eleventh to the fourteenth century it was one of the seats of the Counts of Périgord. It passed by marriage, sale, inheritance before passing into the Albret family. It remained in their hands until 1603, when the king of France Henry IV ceded it to François de Hautefort, Lord of Thenon.

Their Château de Montignac, destroyed in 1825, now lies in ruins, though some wall bases, terraces and a single tower remain. Situated at a strategic site with a fine bridge over the Vézère, the current bridge dates from 1766 to 1767. Each side of the river testifies to the history of the city. On the right bank, there are still a few narrow medieval alleys with architectural from the 14th, 15th and 16th centuries: houses on stilts, half-timbered houses and fountains.

On the left bank, the suburb with its convent, its priory and its quays, recalls the religious and commercial (merchant port) aspects of the city under the old regime. Montignac was the home of the nineteenth-century French writer Eugène Le Roy, who was a district tax collector and wrote two celebrated novels about rural life in eighteenth-century Périgord. There is a small museum in the town dedicated to him.

Montignac was the main area for the district between 1790 and 1795. On the Condat-Le Lardin à Sarlat rail line, the train station at Montignac opened its doors in October 1899; It was in use by passengers until 1940 and by freight up until 1955.

== Tourism ==
Montignac-Lascaux is the main centre for visiting the prehistoric sites in the Vézère valley. The modern part of the town to the south of the river has several hotels and the tourist office. To the north of the river lies the old town, where there are a maze of streets with fourteenth- to sixteenth-century timbered houses. A market is held here twice weekly and there are restaurants where visitors can sit beside the river under medieval timbered beams.

Montignac-Lascaux has a historic bridge, from which fireworks are launched on holidays such as Bastille Day and during the summer festival of world folklore and dance, which is held annually in July.

The main attraction of the region is the Lascaux Cave, a complex of caves containing Upper Paleolithic painted art discovered in 1940 and estimated to be 17,300 years old. The cave was put on show in 1948, but it was found that the paintings were being damaged by the carbon dioxide exhaled by visitors, and in 1963, the cave was closed to the public. A replica cave, known as Lascaux II, was opened nearby in 1983, so that visitors could still experience the paintings without damaging the originals. Since 2016 a larger and more accurate replica is displayed in Lascaux IV Centre International de l'Art Pariétal built by Snøhetta in Montignac. In 1979, Lascaux was added to the UNESCO World Heritage Sites list along with other prehistoric sites in the Vézère valley.

== Population ==
Historical population
Year	Pop.	±% p.a.
1968	2,949	—
1975	3,081	+0.63%
1982	3,135	+0.25%
1990	2,938	−0.81%
1999	3,023	+0.32%
2007	2,870	−0.65%
2012	2,804	−0.46%
2017	2,770	−0.24%
2023	2,762	−0.05%
Source: INSEE

== See also ==
- Communes of the Dordogne department
