= Antoine Dieu =

French painter

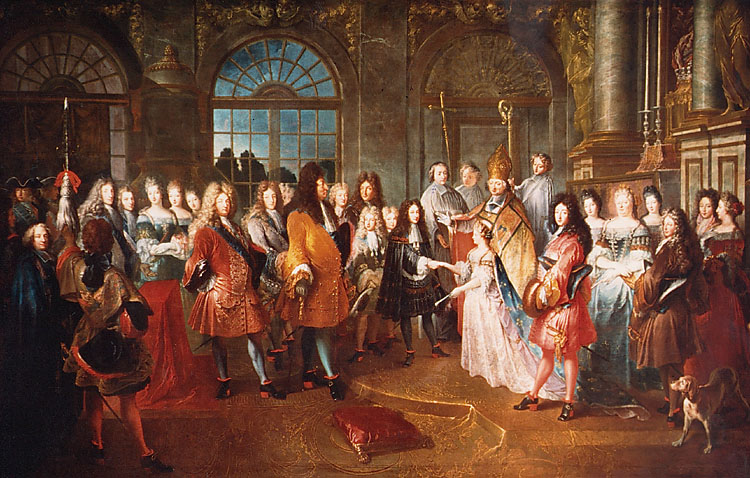
Marriage of the Duke of Burgundy, 7 December 1697, a cartoon from 1715 for the Gobelins Manufactory

Antoine Dieu (French pronunciation: [ɑ̃twan djø]; ca. 1661–1727) was a French painter born in Paris. He was a son of Edouard Dieu, an engraver, who died in Paris in 1703. He was instructed by Lebrun, and painted historical subjects and portraits in the style of his master. The Duke of Burgundy before the King and the Marriage of the Duke of Burgundy are in the Museum at Versailles, but his best work is the portrait of Louis XIV. on his Throne, which was engraved by Nicolas Arnoult. Dieu was received at the Academy in 1722, and died in Paris in 1727. His brothers, Jean Dieu and Jean Baptiste Dieu, were engravers; the former was born about 1658, and died in Paris in 1714.

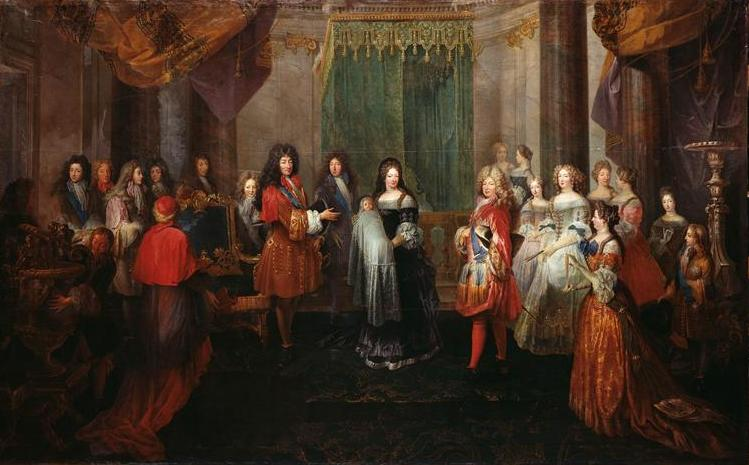
The birth of the Duke of Burgundy at Versailles on 6 August 1682
