= Audran family =

French family

The Audran family was a French family of engravers and painters, mainly active in Paris and Lyon. The first well-known member was Charles Audran (1594–1674).

== Claude Audran the Elder (1597–1675) ==
Claude Audran the Elder (1597 – 18 November 1675) was a French engraver.

Audran the brother (or, as some say, the cousin) of Charles Audran, was born in Paris. After receiving some instruction from Charles, he moved to Lyon, where he died in 1677. It is uncertain whether or not he visited Rome. His engravings, which are signed either "Claude Audran", or "Cl. Audran", are executed in the manner of Cornelis Cort and F. Villamena. They are mostly portraits and allegories. He left three sons, Germain, Claude the younger, and Gérard.

== Germain Audran (1631–1710) ==
Germain Audran, who was born and died at Lyon, was instructed by his uncle Charles Audran in the art of engraving in Paris. His merit was considerable, although very inferior to that of some others of his family. Germain had four sons, Claude III, Benoit I, Jean, and Louis. He engraved several plates, consisting of portraits, and a variety of ornaments, ceilings, and vases, amongst which are the following :

- Portraits of Charles Emmanuel II of Savoy, and his wife, in an oval; after Ferdinand de la Monce.
- Portrait of Cardinal de Richelieu, in an oval.
- Portrait of Theophile Reynauld. 1663.
- Six sheets of Ceilings; after George Charmeton.
- Six ornaments of Vases; after N. Robert.
- A book of Friezes; after Raymond Lafage.
- A book of views in Italy; after Fancus.
- Six Landscapes; after Gaspar Poussin.
- Thirty-one designs — Of Fountains, Friezes, &c.; after Le Brun.

His plates are signed with his surname, and with his Christian name, in the following forms: G: Ger: Germ: and in full.

== Claude Audran the Younger (1639–1684) ==
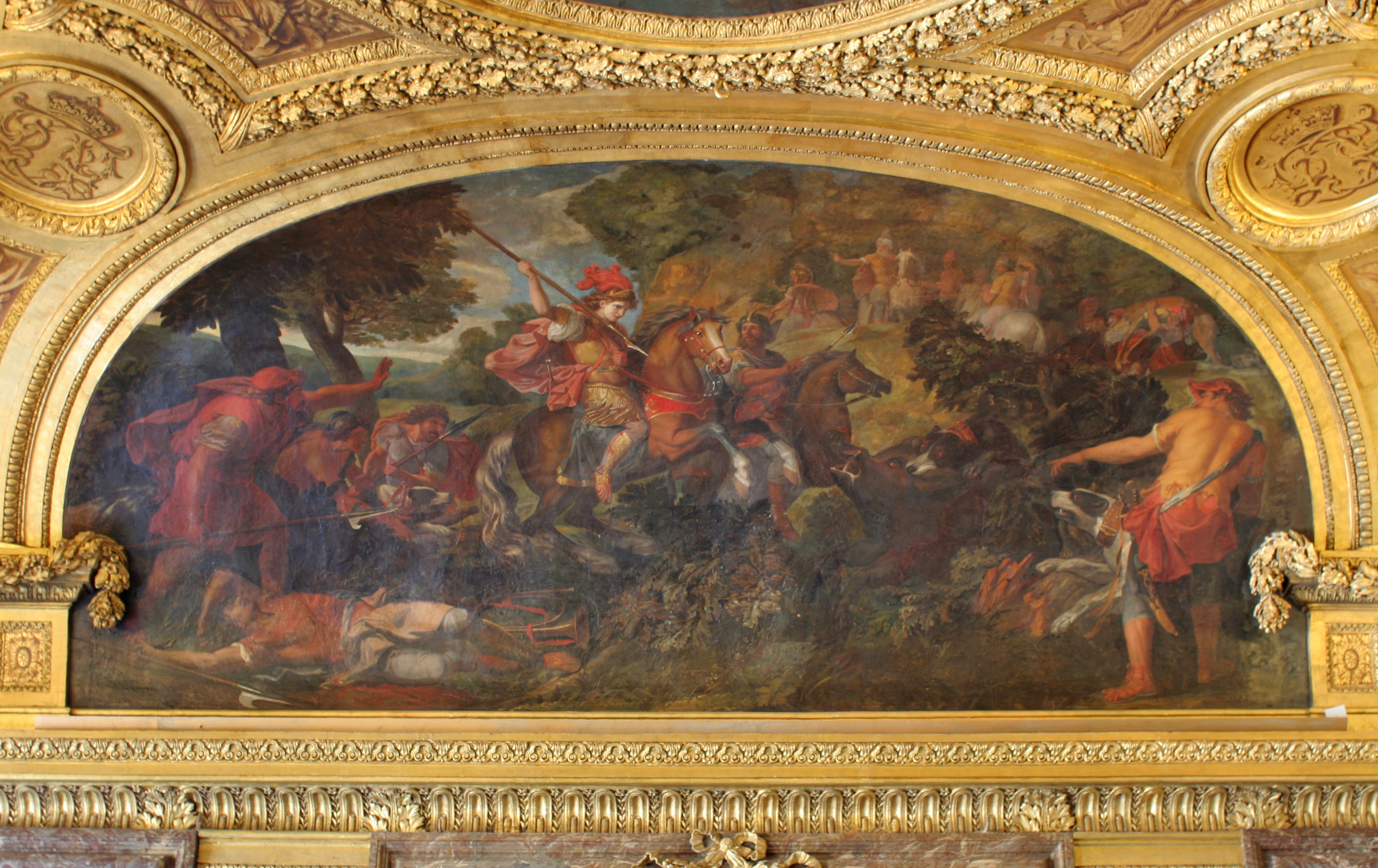
Cyrus Hunting Wild Boar by Claude Audran the Younger, Palace of Versailles

Claude Audran the Younger, the second son of Claude Audran the Elder, was born at Lyon. He is also known as Claude Audran II. He studied drawing with his uncle Charles Audran in Paris, and subsequently went to Rome. On his return he was engaged by Le Brun at Paris, and assisted him in his pictures of the 'Passage of the Granicus,' the 'Battle of Arbela,' and in many other of his works; and was an imitator of his style. He painted also in fresco, under the direction of Le Brun, the chapel of Colbert's Château at Sceaux, the gallery of the Tuileries, the grand staircase at the Palace of Versailles, and other works. He drew well, and had great facility of execution. He died in Paris in 1684.

== Louis Audran (1670-c. 1712) ==
Louis Audran, the fourth and youngest son of Germain Audran, was born at Lyon in 1670, and instructed in engraving by his uncle Gérard Audran. He did not execute many plates, but assisted his brothers in forwarding theirs. He died at Paris about 1712. He engraved some copies of the large plates executed by his relatives. There is a set of seven middle-sized plates by him of the 'Seven Acts of Mercy,' after Bourdon. He also engraved after the works of Le Brun, Poussin, and other French painters.

== Benoît Audran the Younger (1698–1772) ==
Self portrait of Benoît Audran the Younger after a drawing by Joseph Vivien

Benoît Audran, called the Younger, to distinguish him from his uncle Benoît Audran the Elder, was a French artist born in Paris in 1698, and died there in 1772. He was the son and pupil of Jean Audran, and engraved in the same manner as his father. He engraved prints after Paolo Veronese, Poussin, Natoire, Lancret, Watteau, and other French artists.

== Prosper-Gabriel Audran (1744–1819) ==
Prosper-Gabriel Audran was a French etcher. Audran was born in Paris, the grandson of Jean Audran, and was a pupil of his uncle Benoît Audran the Younger, but having no vocation for art, he abandoned it for the law. He afterwards became teacher of Hebrew in the Collège de France, which office he retained until his death in 1819. He etched some studies of heads.
