= Charles Audran =

French engraver

- Frontispiece for Jacques Goutoulas' Universa Historia Profana
- Born: 1594; Paris, (Kingdom of France)
- Died: 1674 (aged 79–80); Paris, (Kingdom of France)
- Education: Matthaeus Greuter
- Occupation: Engraver
- Movement: Baroque
- Family: Audran family

Charles Audran (1594–1674) was a French Baroque engraver. He was the founder of the Audran dinasty of engravers.

== Life ==
Charles Audran was the first of the Audran family who became eminent in the art of engraving. He was born in Paris in 1594. In his boyhood he showed a great disposition for the art. He received some instruction in drawing, and when still young went to Rome to complete his studies, where he is thought to have trained under Matthaeus Greuter. There he produced some plates that were admired. He finished his works with great care, and seems to have modeled his style on that of Cornelis Bloemaert. According to John Herbert Slater, he may have been influenced by the prints of Lucas Kilian and of the Sadeler family.

On his return to France he lived for some time in Lyons, but finally settled in Paris, where he died in 1674, aged 80. Among his finest works are four plates illustrating Charles Le Brun's Les quatre saisons, a design intended for the ceiling of the grand salon at Vaux-le-Vicomte. Among his book illustrations, the suite of full-length portraits for Pierre Le Moyne's La Gallerie des femmes fortes (The Gallery of Great Women) stands out. Audran marked his prints, which are very numerous, in the early part of his life with a "C-", until his brother Claude, who also engraved a few plates, marked them with the same letter; he then changed it for K., as the initial of Karl. Meyer's Künstler-Lexikon lists 223 of his works.

== Works ==
=== Portraits ===
- Henri of Condé, with the Four Cardinal Virtues; K. Audran, sc.; oval.
- André Laurent, physician to Henry IV; oval.
- Pierre Séguier; oval, with ornaments; after Chauveau.
- An allegorical subject, of two Portraits, with a Genius painting a third Portrait; inscribed on the pallet, unus ex duobus; signed C. Audran, fecit.

=== Subjects after different masters ===
Frontispiece for Pierre Le Moyne's La Gallerie des femmes fortes, after Pietro da Cortona, 1647, Sainte-Geneviève Library, Paris

- Title page for Pierre Le Moyne's La Gallerie des femmes fortes (1647), representing Anne of Austria and nineteen other eminent women, with a subject from their life in the background; after Pietro da Cortona.
- The Annunciation; inscribed Spiritus Sanctus, fe.; after Lodovico Carracci, incorrectly attributed on the plate to Annibale; very fine; it is the picture in the Cathedral at Bologna.
- The Baptism of Christ; small oval; after Annibale Carracci; unsigned.
- St. Francis de Paula; after Mellin; marked Carl. Audran, so.
- The Stoning of Stephen; after Palma il Giovane.
- The Conception of the Virgin Mary; after Stella.
- The Nativity; after the same.
- The Holy Family, with St. Catharine and Angels; after the same; fine.
- The Upbringing of Jupiter, after Andrea Sacchi.
- The Virgin and Infant Jesus, St. John presenting an Apple, and St. Catharine kneeling; after Titian.
- The Virgin Mary and Infant Jesus treading on the Serpent; after Giovanni Valesio.
- A Thesis, representing Religion as the true Knowledge; inscribed Non judiciamus, etc.; after Claude Vignon.
- St. Francis de Paula in ecstasy before the Sacrament; after Simon Vouet.
- Frontispiece for a Book, Fame holding the Portrait of Cardinal Mazarin; after the same.
- The Assumption of the Virgin; after Domenichino.

== Gallery ==
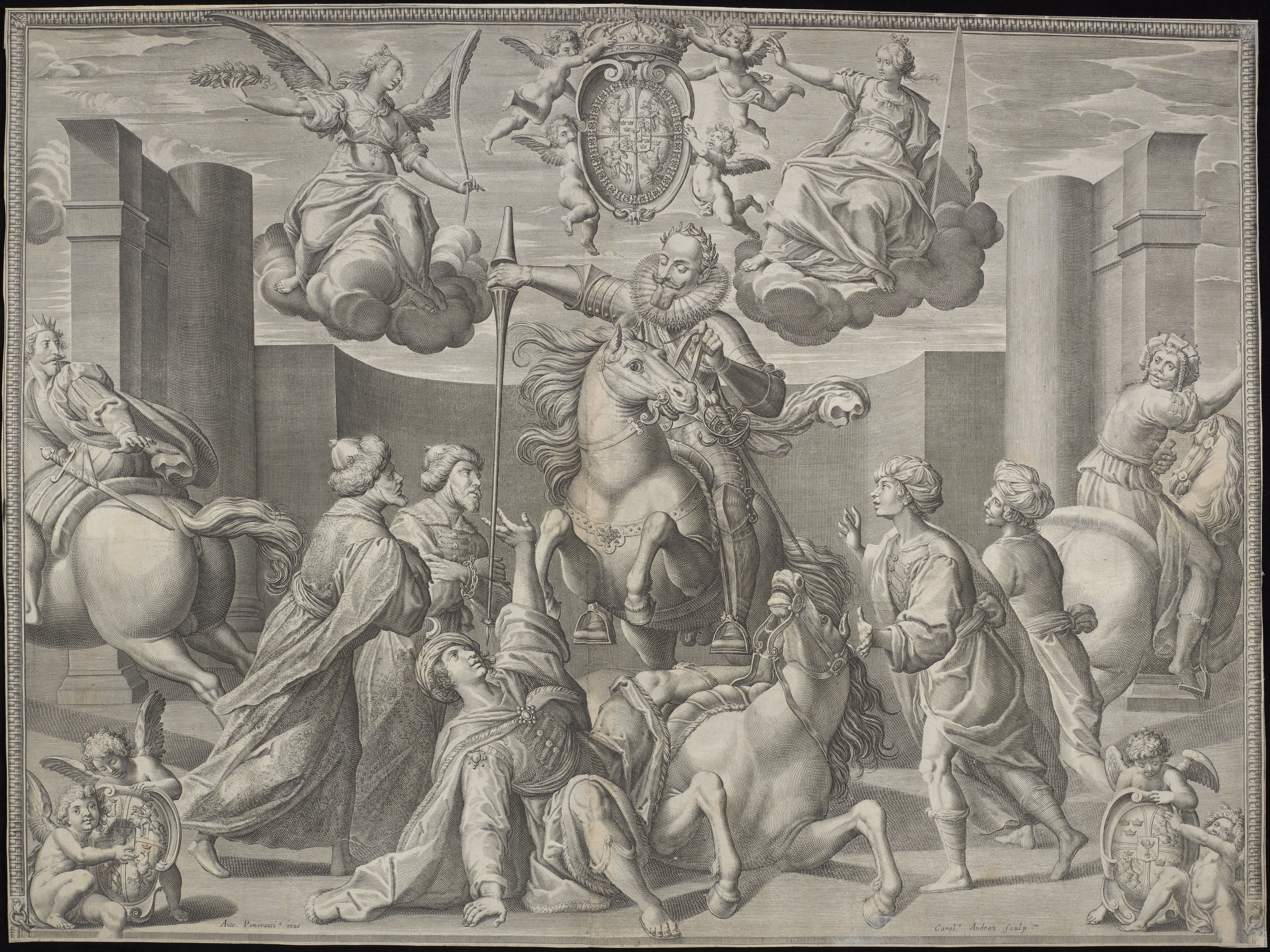
Apotheosis of Sigismund III Vasa, king of Poland, after victory at Chocim, c. 1629, National Library of Poland, Warsaw

Allegory of Winter, 1634, Metropolitan Museum of Art, New York

Frontispiece for Polycarpe de la Rivière's Angélique des excellences de l'âme, 1626, Metropolitan Museum of Art, New York

The Annunciation, after Ludovico Carracci, Bibliothèque nationale de France, Paris

The Upbringing of Jupiter, after Andrea Sacchi, 1630–1634, Rijksmuseum, Amsterdam

The Virgin and Infant Jesus, St. John presenting an Apple, and St. Catharine kneeling, after Titian, Leiden University Library

St. Francis de Paula in ecstasy before the Sacrament, 1637 after Simon Vouet, Rijksmuseum, Amsterdam

Ancient man with mask and banderole, after Joachim von Sandrart, Rijksmuseum, Amsterdam
