= Pierre Lachambeaudie =

French fabulist, poet, goguettier and chansonnier

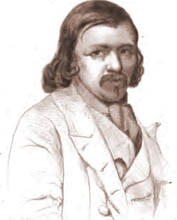
- Pierre Lachambeaudie
- Born: 16 December 1806; Montignac (Dordogne)
- Died: 7 July 1872 (aged 65); Brunoy
- Occupations: Fabulist; Poet; Chansonnier

Pierre Casimir Hyppolyte Lachambeaudie (French pronunciation: [pjɛʁ kazimiʁ ipɔlit laʃɑ̃bodi]; 16 December 1806 – 7 July 1872) was a 19th-century French fabulist, poet, goguettier and chansonnier, as well as a follower of Saint-Simonianism.

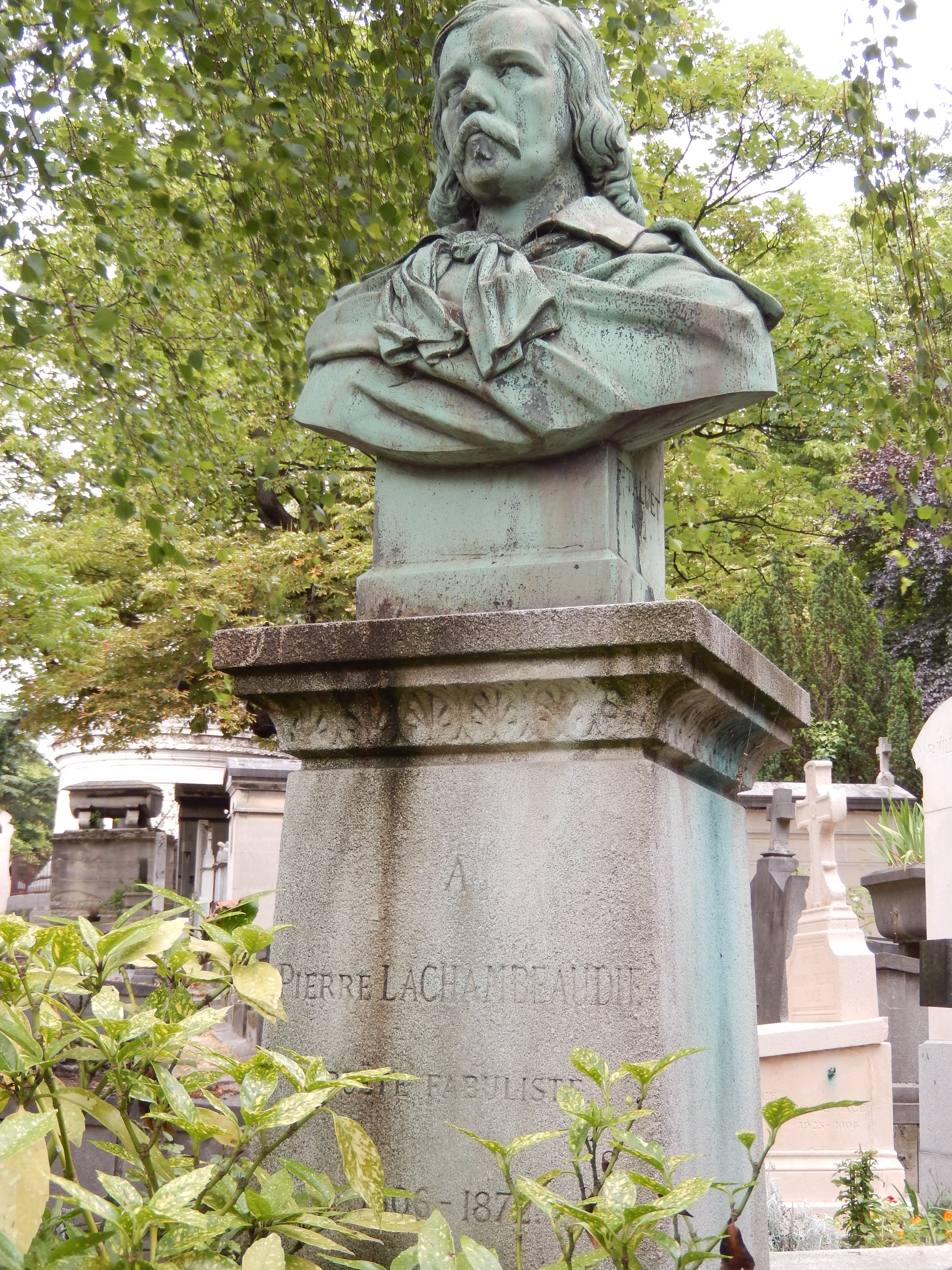
Pierre Lachambeaudie's grave at (Père Lachaise cemetery)

His fables were crowned twice by the Académie française.

He is buried at cimetière du Père-Lachaise in Paris (48th division).

The place Lachambeaudie in the 12th arrondissement of Paris was named after him in 1905.

== Selected publications ==
- 1829: Essais poétiques
- 1844: Fables populaires de Pierre Lachambeaudie, with a preface by Émile Souvestre
- Fables de Pierre Lachambeaudie, preceded by a letter-preface by Pierre Jean de BérangerText online
- 1861: Les Fleurs de Villemomble, poésies nouvelles
- 1865: Fables et poésies nouvelles
- 1867: Prose et vers de Pierre Lachambeaudie Text online
- 1903: Fables, aquarellées par A. Vimar, with a preface by Auguste Bourgoin including a biography and an analysis of Lachambeaudie's work Text online

== Bibliography ==
- Eugène de Mirecourt, Lachambeaudie, Paris : Gustave Havart, 1857 Text online
- Gabrielli, Domenico (2002). Dictionnaire historique du cimetière du Père-Lachaise XVIIIe-XIXe (in French). Paris: éd. de l'Amateur. p. 334. ISBN 978-2-85917-346-3. OCLC 49647223.
