= Claude Audran III =

French painter

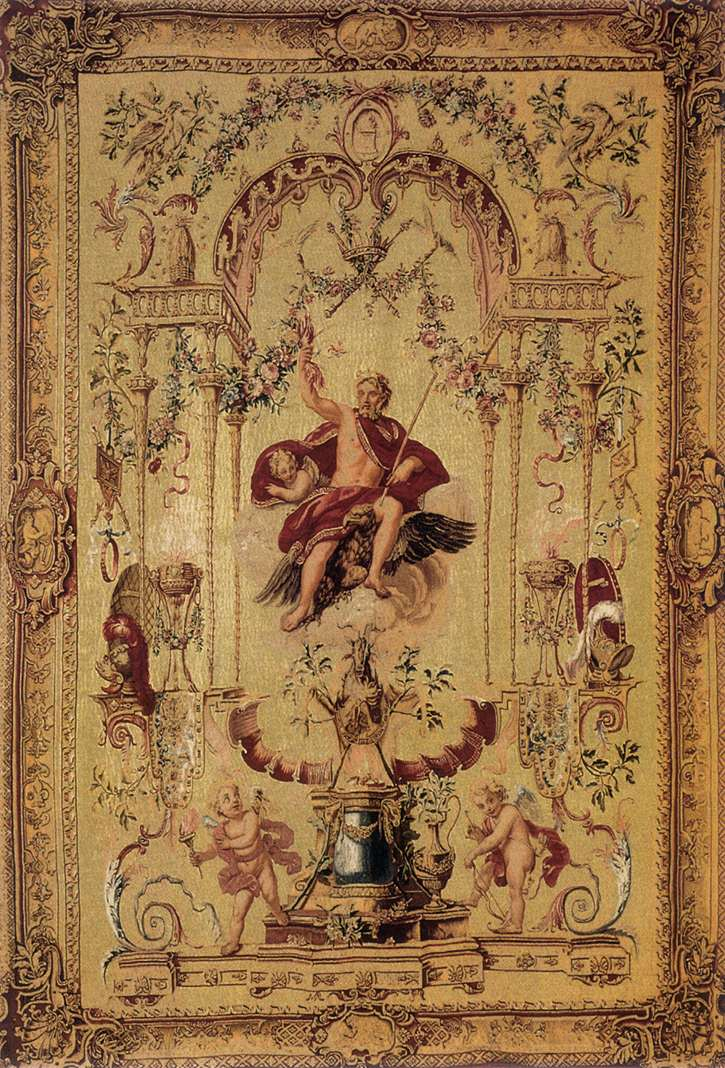
- The Gods: Jupiter; Claude Audran III tapestry, Gobelins Manufactory
- Born: 25 August 1658; Lyon, Lyonnais, France
- Died: 27 May 1734 (aged 75); Paris, France
- Occupation: Painter
- Workplace: Paris
- Influenced by: Antoine Watteau
Complements
- Member of the Audran family of artists

Claude Audran III (25 August 1658 – 27 May 1734) was a French painter.

Audran was born in Lyon into a family of artists. He lived with his uncle, Claude Audran the Younger. Painter to King Louis XIV in 1699. From 1700 to 1701 he took part in the decoration of the Menagerie of Versailles and the Chapels of Versailles, and the Palace of Fontainebleau, Château d'Anet, Château de Meudon, and Les Invalides. In 1704, he decorated the new apartment of the Duchess at the Château de Sceaux. Audran obtained the office of Keeper of the Luxembourg Palace in 1704. In 1709, he executed a backdrop for King Louis XIV at the Château de Marly. This setting, now destroyed, is known from preparatory drawings.

He was a decorative artist, and made a number of tapestries for the Gobelins. Audran's style included arabesques, grotesques and singeries. He died in Paris in 1734.
