= Gérard Audran =

French engraver

- Engraved portrait of Gérard Audran by Nicolas-Gabriel Dupuis
- Born: 2 August 1640; Lyon, (Kingdom of France)
- Died: 26 July 1703 (aged 62); Paris, (Kingdom of France)
- Occupation: Engraver
- Movement: Baroque
- Family: Audran family

Gérard Audran (or Girard Audran; 2 August 1640 – 26 July 1703), was a French engraver of the Audran family, the third son of Claude Audran.

== Life ==
The youngest son of engraver Claude Audran (1597–1675) and his wife Hélie (née Fratelat), Gérard Audran was born in Lyon on 2 August 1640. His older brothers were the engravers Germain Audran (1631–1710) and Claude Audran the Younger (1639–1684). Like his brothers, he received his initial artistic training from his father. Following his brother's example, he went to Paris to further develop his skills. In 1666, he engraved Le Brun's Constantine's Battle with Maxentius, The Triumph of Constantine and The Stoning of Stephen, to the great satisfaction of the painter, establishing himself as one of the foremost engravers in Paris. The next year he set out for Rome, where he studied under the painter Carlo Maratta for three years.

In Rome, Audran engraved several fine plates based on works by Raphael, Titian, Annibale Carracci, Domenichino, Nicolas Poussin and Pierre Mignard. Jean-Baptiste Colbert was so struck with Audran's works that he persuaded Louis XIV to recall him to Paris. Colbert provided him with lodgings at the Gobelins Manufactory and appointed him the King's official engraver. Colbert also commissioned Audran to engrave Charles Le Brun's recently completed series of historical paintings depicting the Battles of Alexander. Audran's engravings of Le Brun's Battles of Alexander are considered to be among his finest works.

Audran established a workshop on the Rue St. Jacques aux Deux Pilicrs d’or and applied himself assiduously to engraving. On 21 November 1681, he was elected a member of the Académie de peinture et de sculpture. In 1683, he Les proportions du corps humain mesurées sur les plus belles figures de l'Antiquité (The Proportions of the Human Body Measured on the Most Beautiful Figures of Antiquity). The treatise contains thirty engraved plates depicting famous ancient sculptures, such as the Antinous Farnese, Laocoön and His Sons and the Borghese Gladiator, accompanied by detailed geometric measurements of anatomical proportions. The work was widely used by Neoclassical painters and sculptors as a manual of artistic anatomy based on the canons of classical antiquity. Audran died in Paris on 26 July 1703.

== Gallery ==
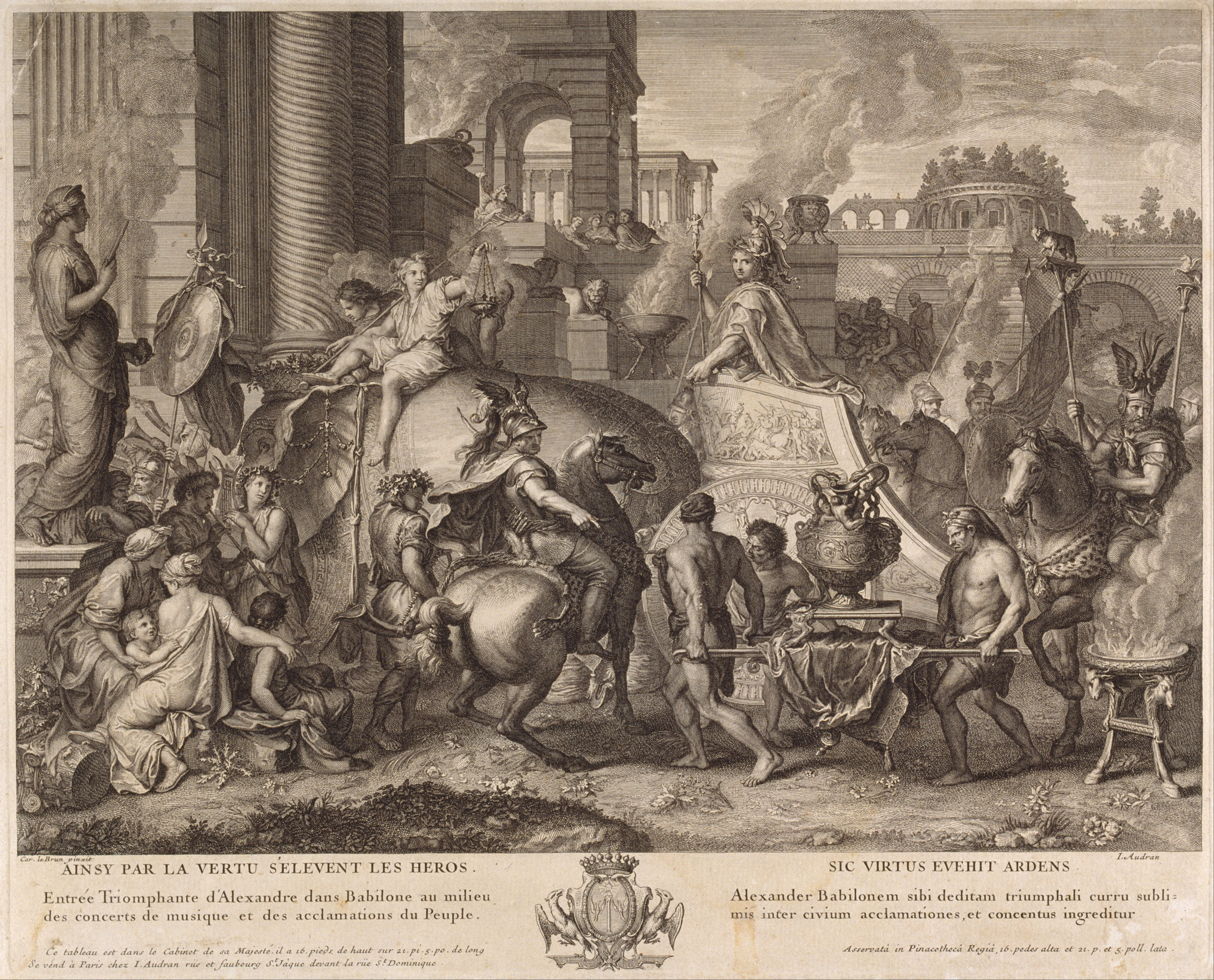
Alexander Entering Babylon, engraved by Audran after Charles Le Brun, 1675, Museu Nacional d'Art de Catalunya, Barcelona

Alexander and Poros, engraved by Audran after Charles Le Brun, 1675, Rijksmuseum, Amsterdam

Allegorical Portrait of Pope Innocent XI, engraved by Audran after Ciro Ferri, 1667-1670, Rijksmuseum, Amsterdam

Judith beheads Holofernes, engraved by Audran after Andrea Sacchi, 1667-1670, Rijksmuseum, Amsterdam

Rinaldo and Armida, engraved by Audran after Nicolas Poussin, Rijksmuseum, Amsterdam

Saint Frances of Rome imploring divine justice, engraved by Audran after Nicolas Poussin, 1640–1642, Rijksmuseum, Amsterdam

Paul and Barnabas preaching in Lystra, engraved by Audran after Raphael, Rijksmuseum, Amsterdam

Ulysses recognizing Achilles among the daughters of Lycomedes, engraved by Audran after Annibale Carracci, Paris Musées Collections
