= Joseph Vivien =

French painter

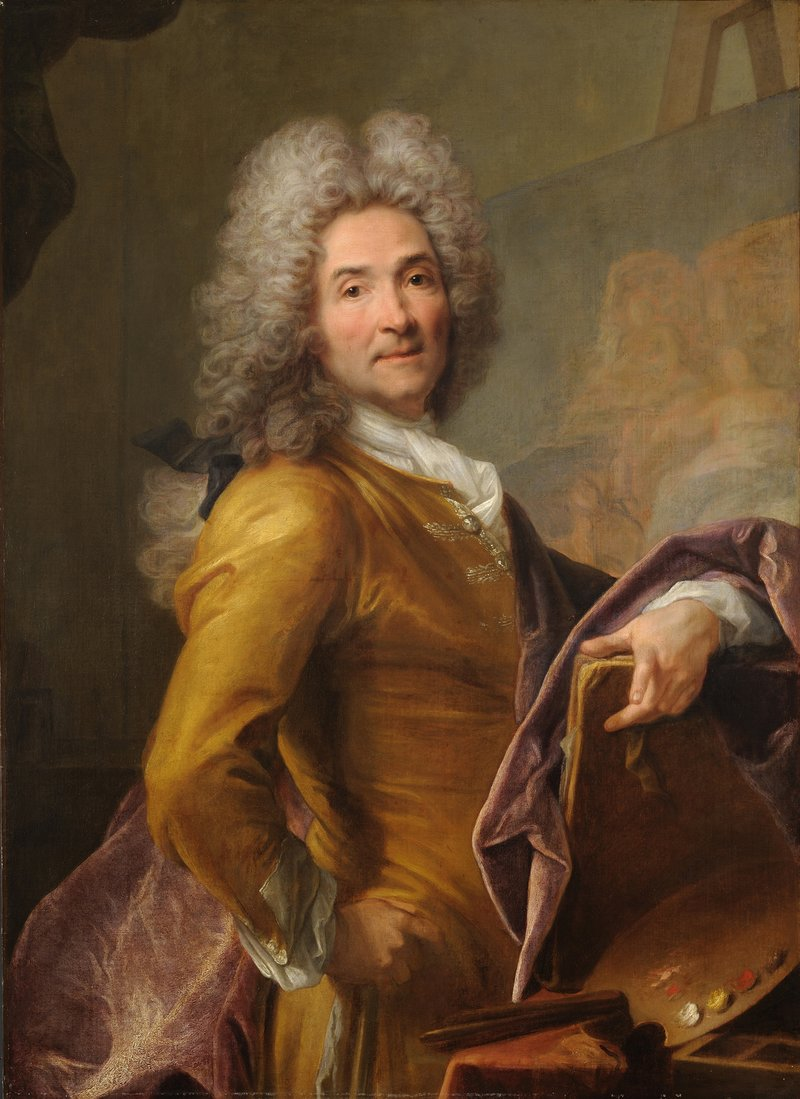
Self-portrait, c. 1715, Museum of Fine Arts of Lyon

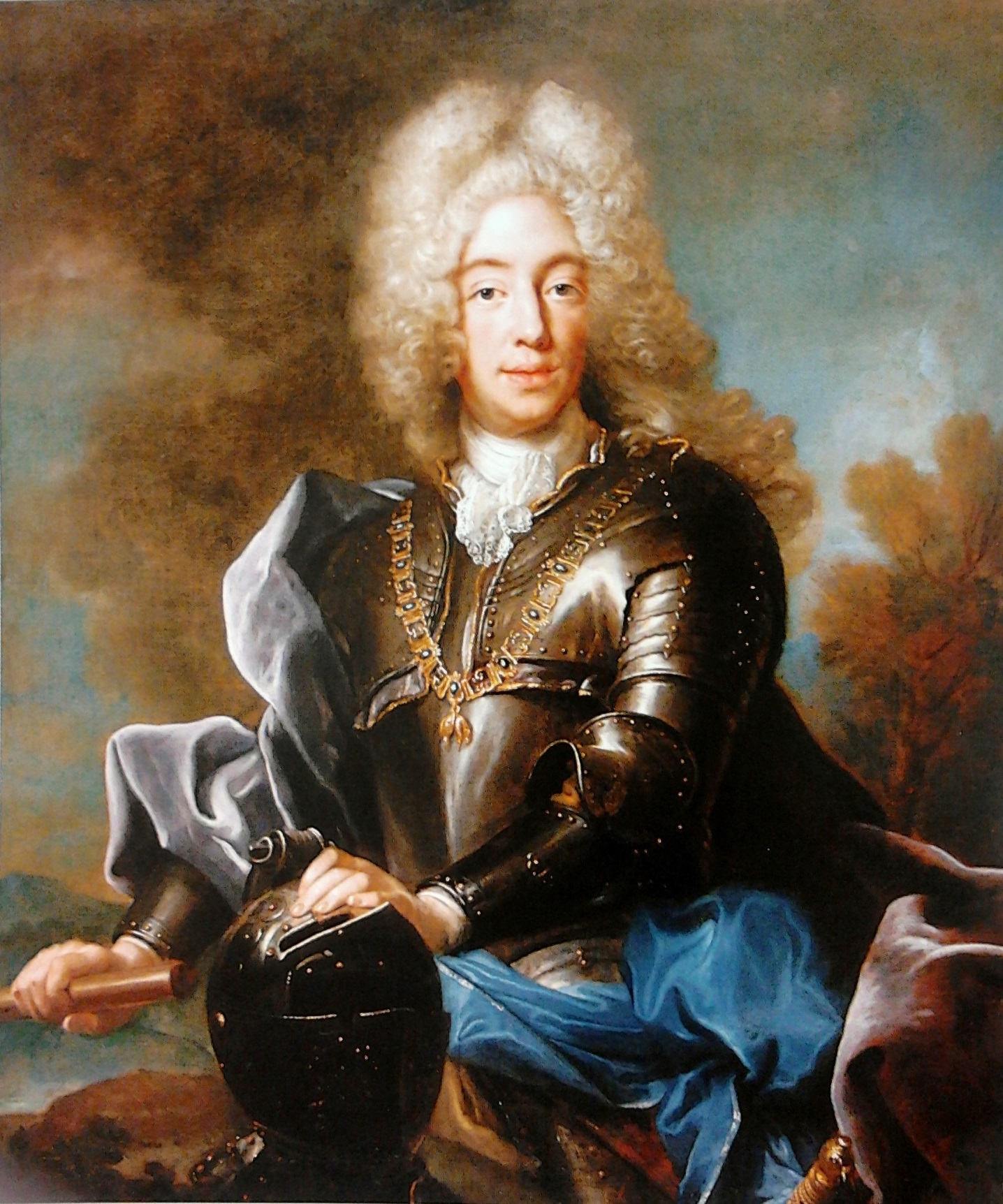
Joseph Vivien, Portrait of Charles Albert of Bavaria, 1717-1719, Royal Castle in Warsaw

Joseph Vivien (1657 – 5 December 1735) was a French painter from Lyon.

He left Lyon for Paris at the age of twenty and found employment in the large atelier of Charles Le Brun, the equivalent of an academy.

He was received in the Académie royale de peinture et de sculpture in 1701, under the designation peintre en pastel. His morceaux de reception, pastel portraits of the sculptor François Girardon and the architect Robert de Cotte, are in the Louvre Museum. He was appointed counsellor to the Academy and provided with lodging under royal auspices at the Gobelins Manufactory.

From Paris he visited Brussels. Vivien was taken up by the francophile Elector of Cologne and worked in Munich as first painter to the Elector's brother, Maximilian Emmanuel, Elector of Bavaria. At the time of his death in Bonn, he was engaged on a vast canvas combining portraits of the whole family of the Elector, in oils.

== Selected illustrations of Vivien's portraits ==
- Maximilian II Emanuel, Elector of Bavaria
- Joseph Ferdinand of Bavaria
- Robert de Cotte, 1701
