= Lune =

Lune may refer to:

== Rivers ==
- River Lune, in Lancashire and Cumbria, England
- River Lune, Durham, in County Durham, England
- Lune (Weser), a 43 km-long tributary of the Weser in Germany
- Lune River (Tasmania), in south-eastern Tasmania, Australia

== Place names ==
- Lune Aqueduct, east of the city of Lancaster in Lancashire, England
- Lune Forest, Site of Special Scientific Interest in Cumbria, England
- Lune River, Tasmania, Australia, a town near the mouth of the river of the same name
- Lüne, a former village near Lüneburg in Saxony where Charlemagne mustered his troops against the Avars

== Mathematics ==
- Lune (geometry), a 2-dimensional arc-defined convex-concave area
  - Lune of Hippocrates, in geometry, a plane region bounded by arcs of circles and amenable to quadrature
- Spherical lune, a 3-dimensional lune

== People ==
- Ted Lune (1920–1968), British actor, played Private Len Bone in the TV series The Army Game
- Dragutin Jovanović-Lune (1892–1932), nicknamed Lune (Луне), Serbian guerrilla fighter, officer, politician, delegate and mayor of Vrnjci

== Films ==
- Moon (2020 film) (French: Lune), a short film by Zoé Pelchat
- Lune (2021 film), a 2021 feature film by Arturo Pérez Torres and Aviva Armour-Ostroff

== Ships ==
- Lune (ship), several ships

== Fictional places and characters ==
- Lhûn or River Lune in J. R. R. Tolkien's Middle-earth legendarium
- Gulf of Lune, also from J. R. R. Tolkien's Middle-earth legendarium
- King Lune, a fictional character in The Horse and His Boy in The Chronicles of Narnia
- Misha Arsellec Lune, a fictional character from Ar tonelico: Melody of Elemia

== Other uses ==
- Lune (poetry), a fixed-form variant of haiku in English
- La Lune, a former French newspaper
- LuneOS, a Linux-based mobile operating system

== See also ==
- Lüne Abbey, in Lüneburg, Germany
- Loon (disambiguation)
- Luna (disambiguation)
- Luning (disambiguation)
- Lunula (disambiguation)
- Lunette (disambiguation)
