= Claude Guillaumin =

French painter and caricaturist (1842–1927)

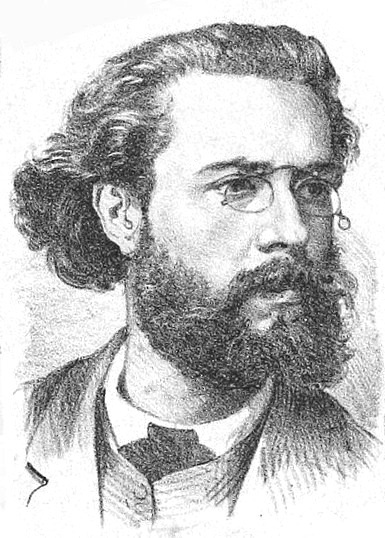
- Born: Claude Guillaumin; 11 August 1842; Allier, France
- Died: 9 March 1927 (aged 84); Paris
- Known for: Caricaturist, artist, illustrator

Claude Guillaumin (11 August 1842 – 9 March 1927) or Édouard Pépin was a French painter and caricaturist.

== Life and career ==
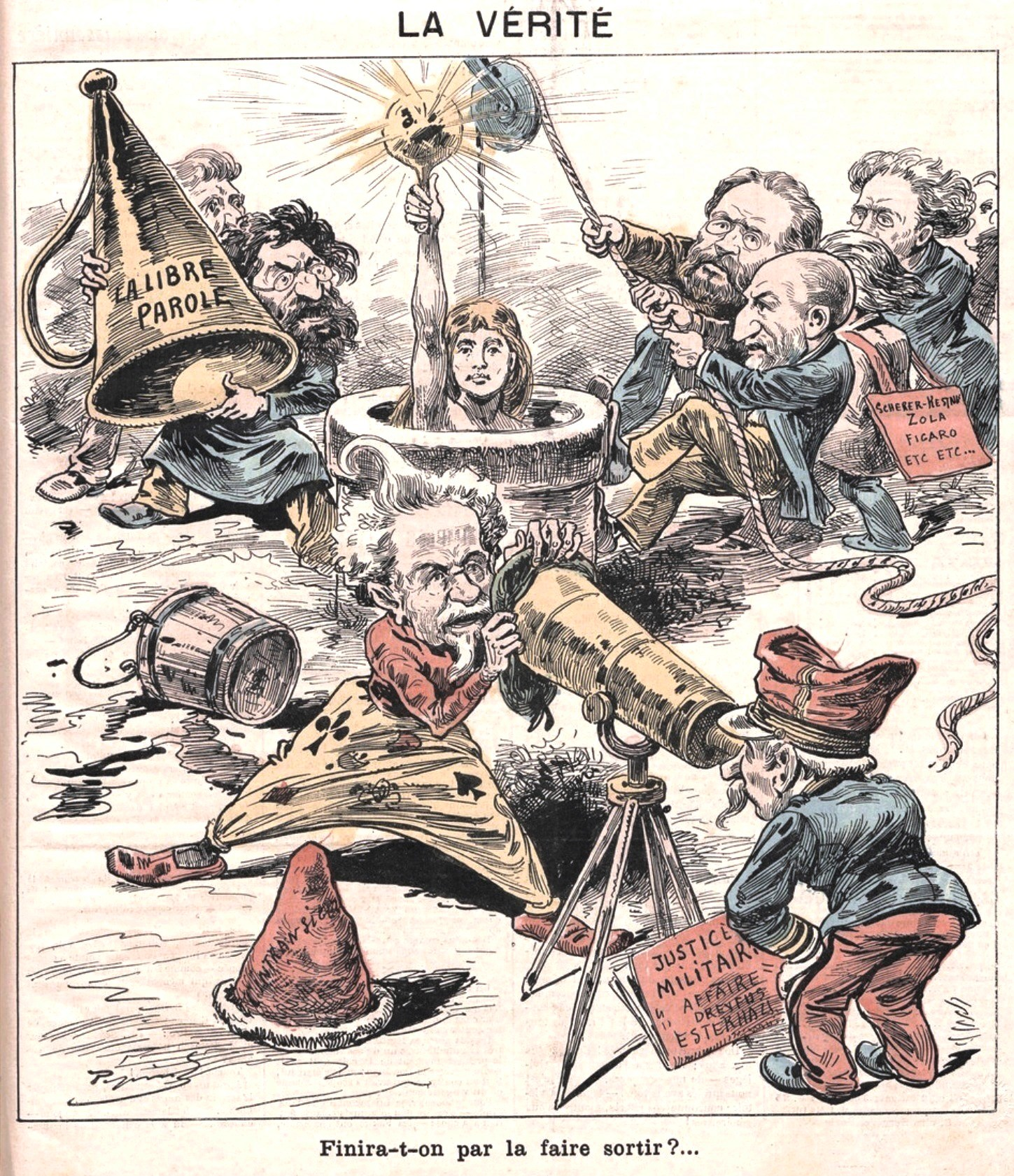
Dreyfusard caricature in Le Grelot, 19 December 1897.

He was born on 11 August 1842 in Moulins. He was one of the Republicans exiled to Algeria during the suppression of the uprisings against the Coup of 2 December 1851. This incident affected the young Claude Guillaumin, who opposed bonapartism and all forms of despotism.

Using the pseudonym Pépin, he made his cartoonist debut at the end of the Second Empire at La Lune (from 1866), La Rue de Jules Vallès (1867-1868), then L'Éclipse. Pépin's cartoons have appeared on the cover of L'Éclipse many times.

In the early part of the Third Republic, Pépin began drawing in 1875 for Le Grelot, for which he had drawn most of the covers between 1876 and 1879, thus replacing Alfred Le Petit. Later, he made illustrations for various magazines. He also worked at Le Lampion de Berluron. In November 1881, Guillaumin became the administrator of this satirical magazine, in which he freely conveyed his anti-religionist ideologies. In the same years, his caricatures were also published in Le Troupier.

In the mid-1880s Pépin returned to Le Grelot. As a radical Republican, he made accusations against monarchists, Catholics, Boulangists (especially Henri Rochefort) and socialists there. Pépin later joined the Dreyfusard camp. From the end of the autumn of 1897 he had a conflict with the director of Le Grelot over a caricature of General Mercier, in which he expressed his thoughts. Pépin then decided to start his own weekly satirical magazine, Le Fouet. He also sent drawings to Petit Rouennais between 1901 and 1902.

Pépin was a student of Henri Harpignies, he was also a painter. Like his master, he produced works on landscapes. In 1890 he exhibited Le Chantier du Père Gazut at the Paris Salon. In 1917 he drew the Cher coast, Puisaye and Montrichard.

He died on 9 March 1927 in the 9th arrondissement of Paris.

== Gallery ==
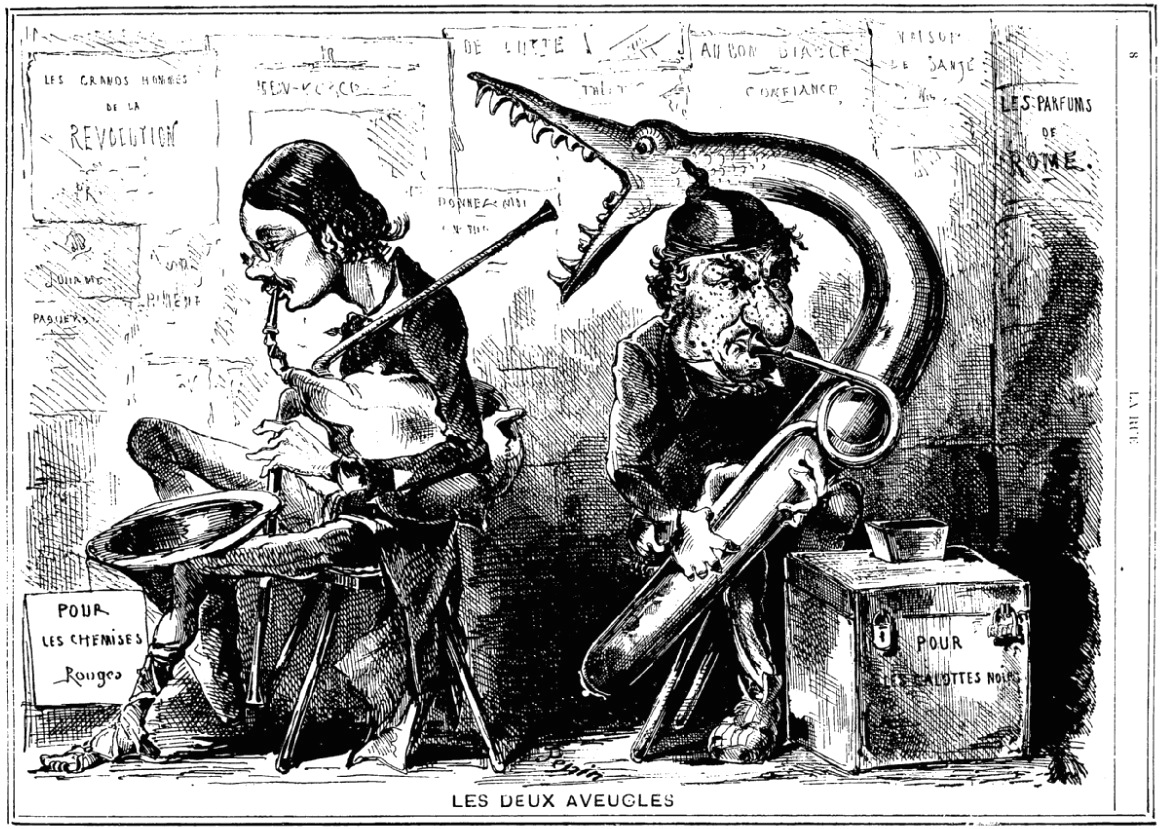
Auguste Vermorel and Louis Veuillot

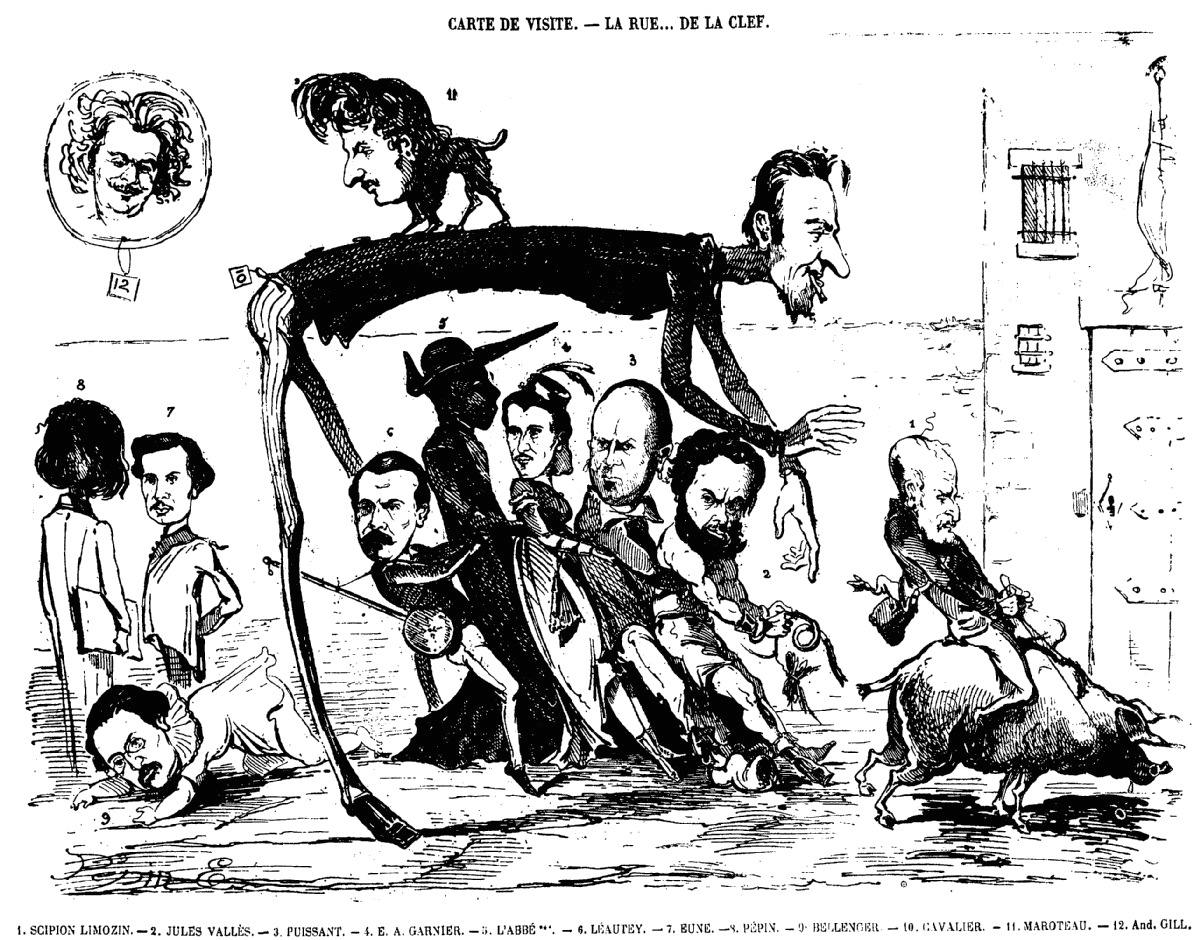
La Rue team

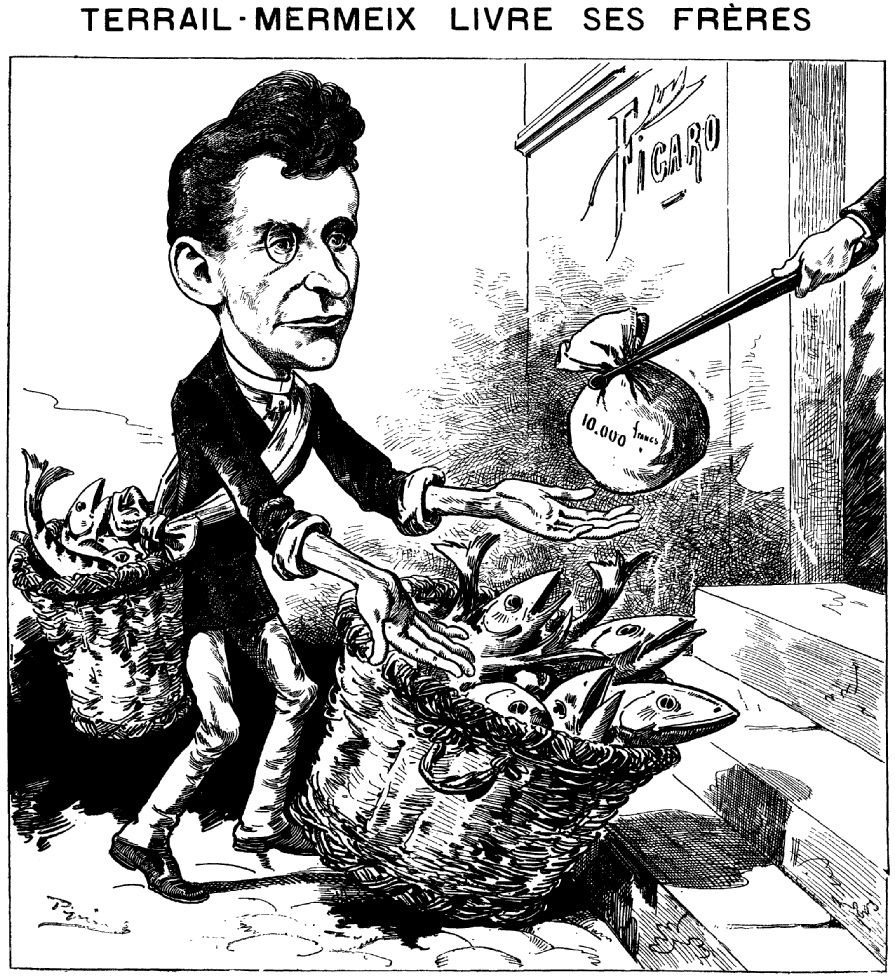
Baker Gabriel Terrail

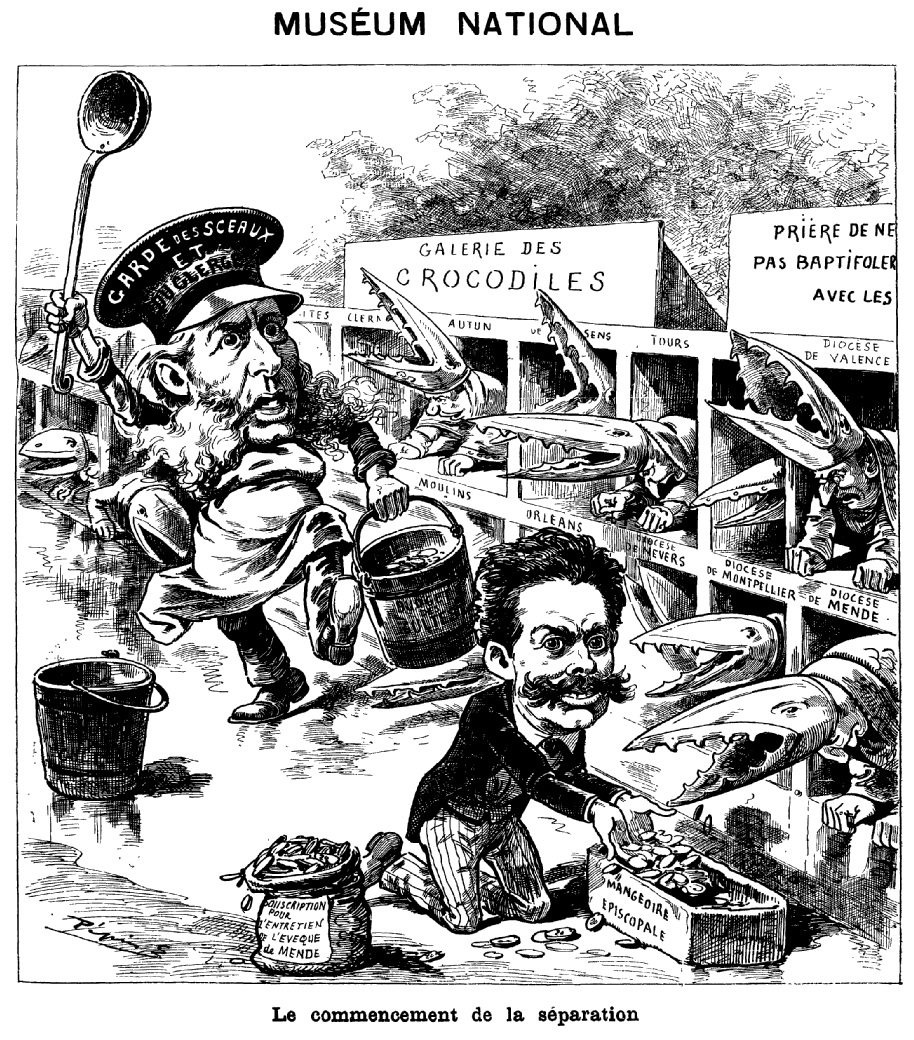
Paul de Cassagnac raises money for Bishop of Mende whose salary is suspended by Louis Ricard

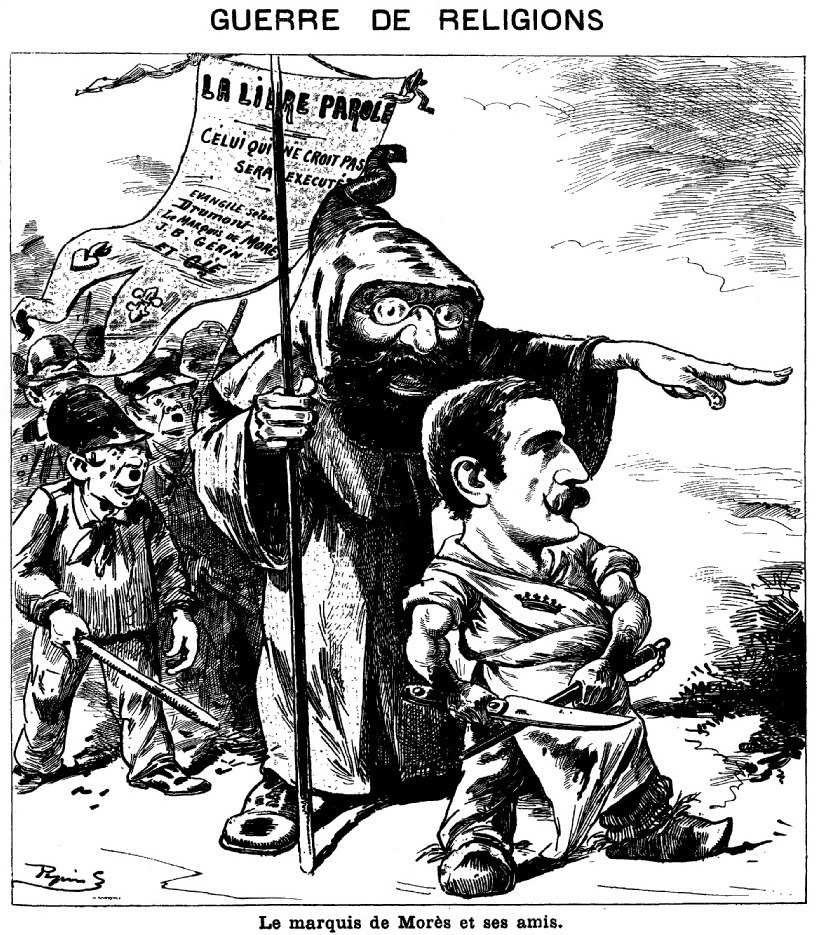
Marquis de Mores and Drumont

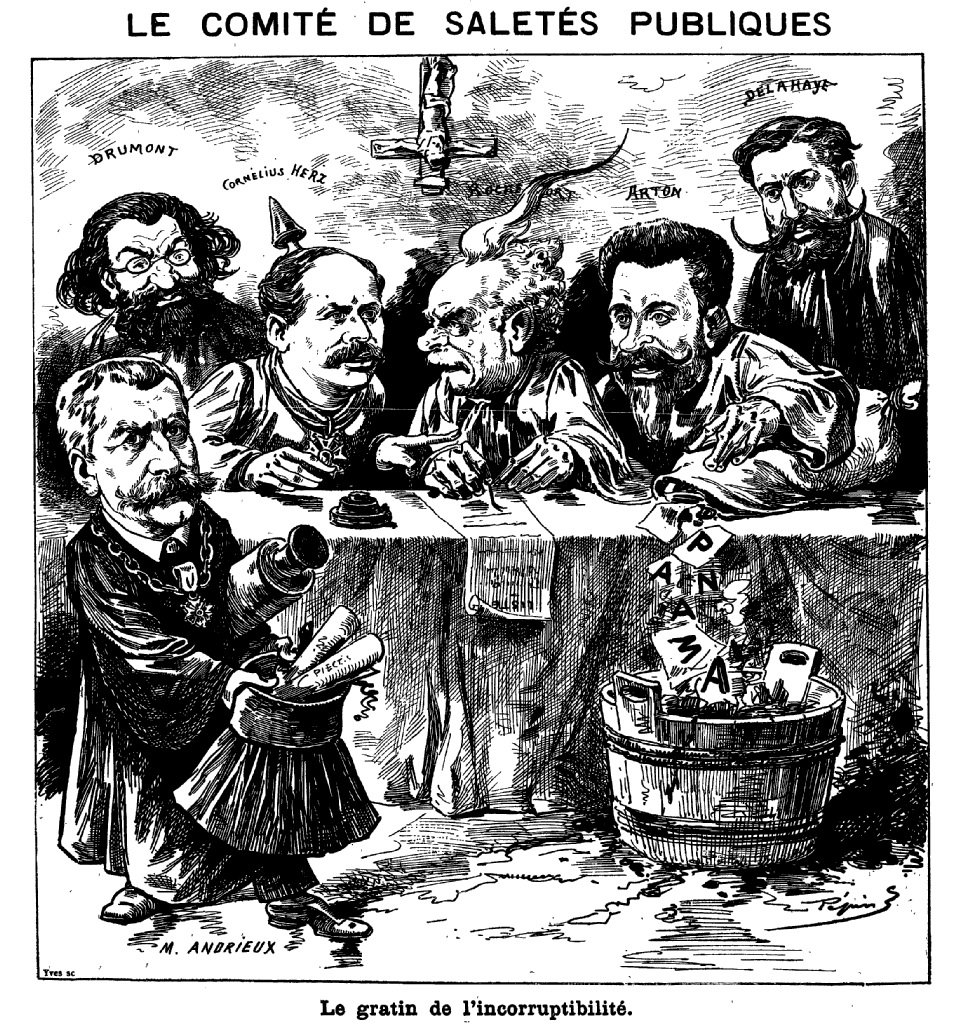
Panama scandal

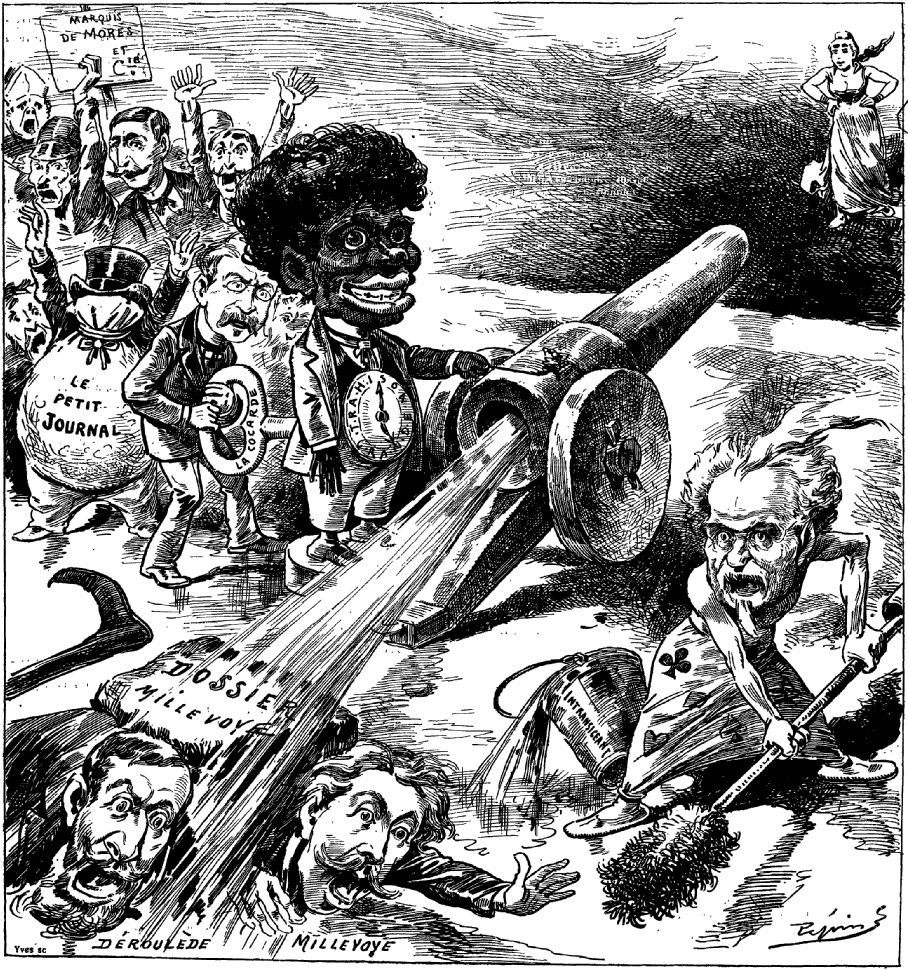
Norton incident

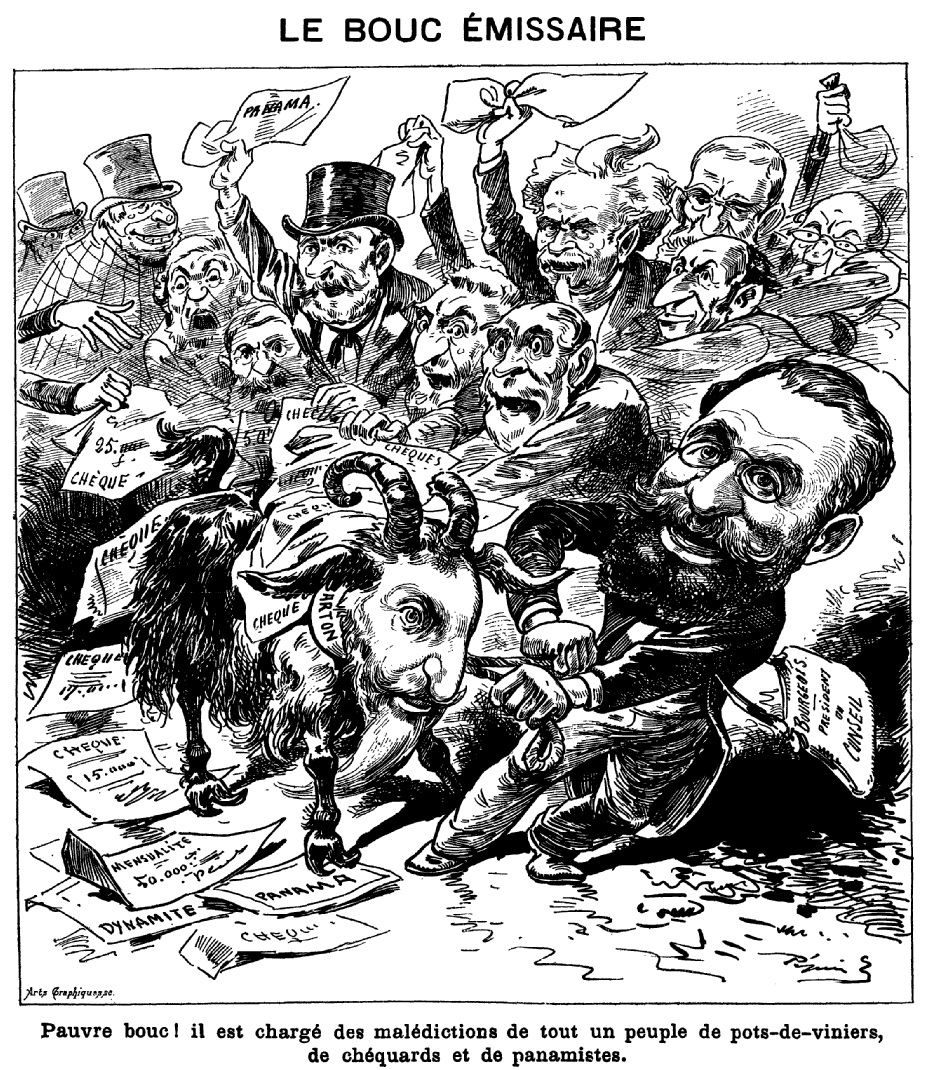
Arton's arrest

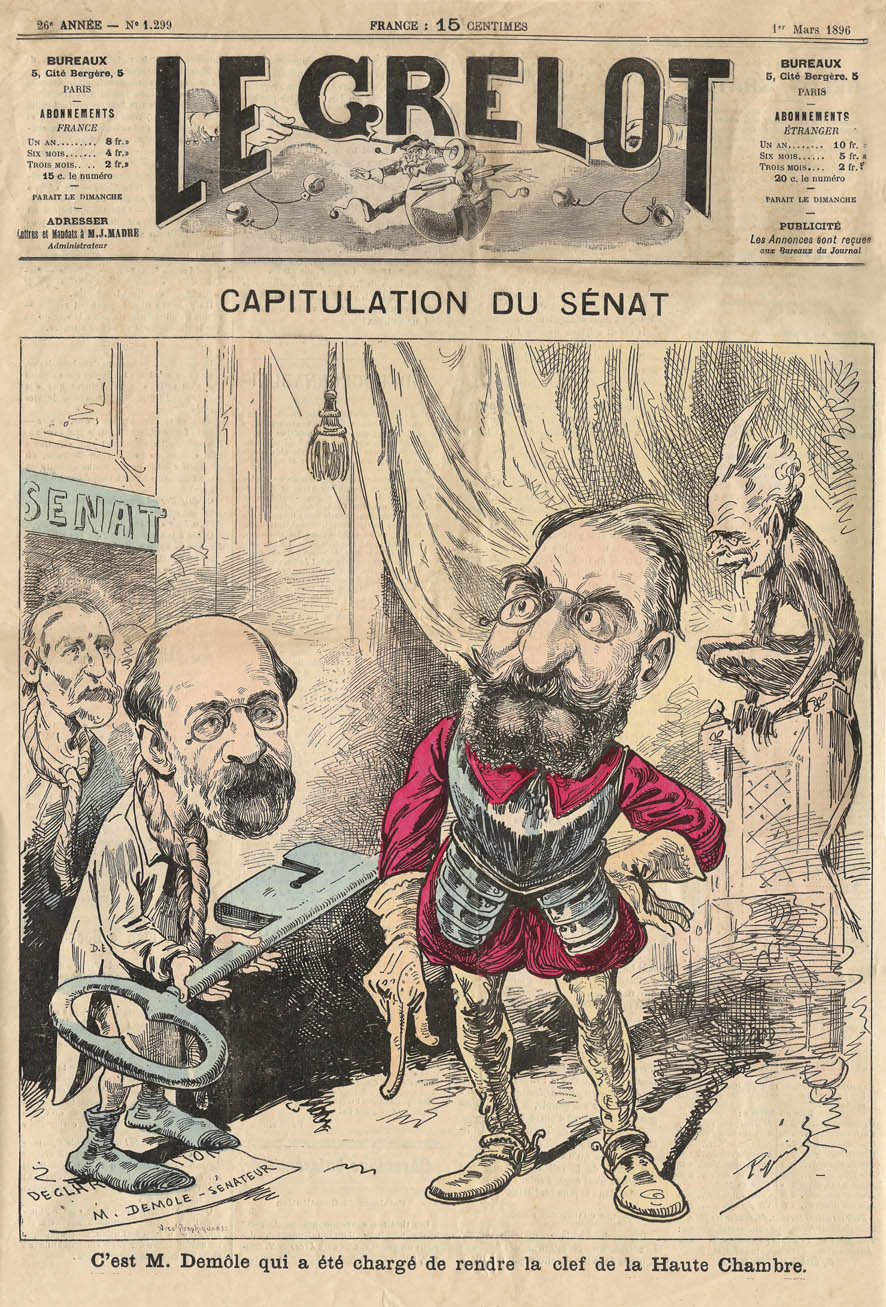
Léon Bourgeois and Charles Demole

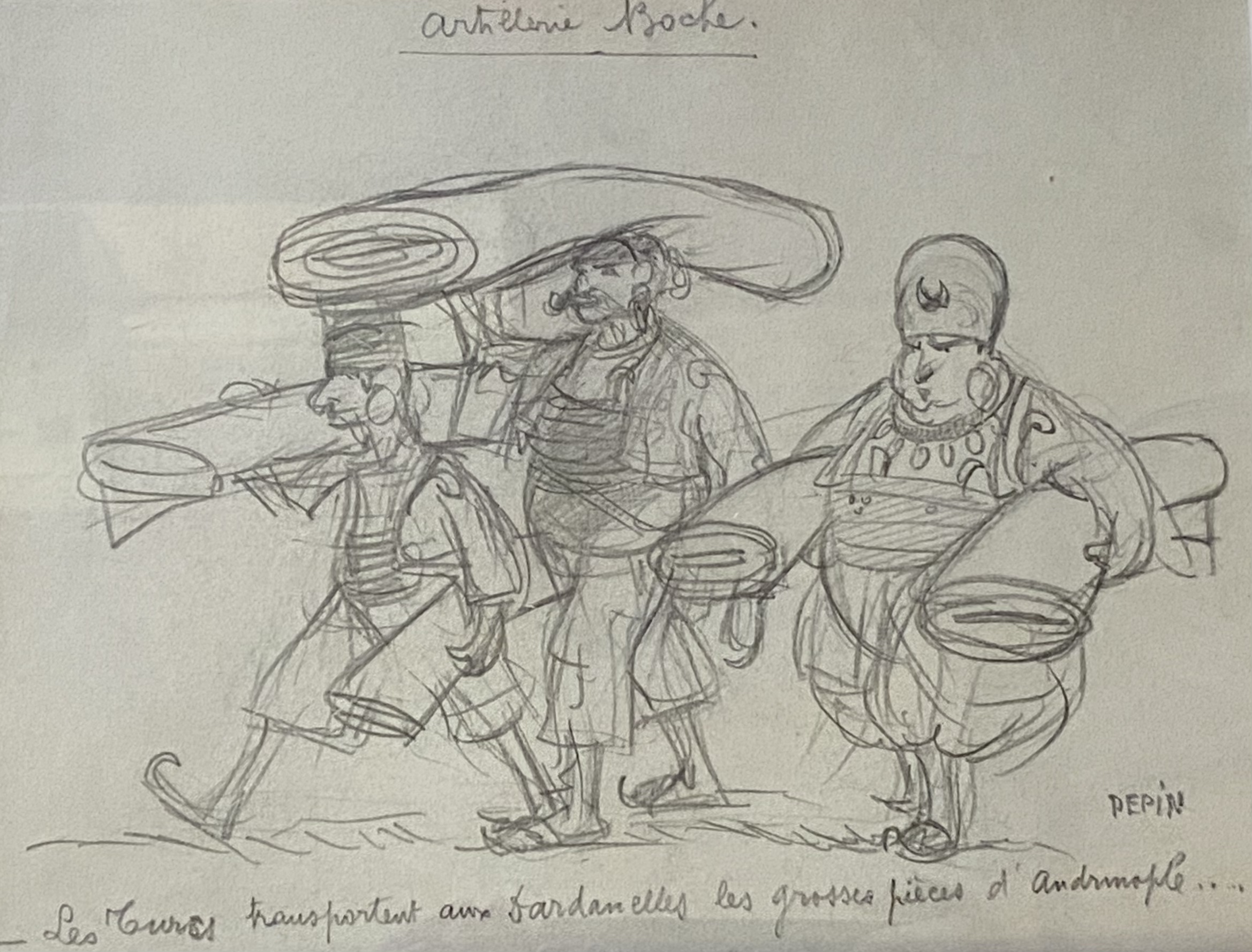
Artillerie Boche

== Bibliography ==
- "Note on Painter Cl.-Edouard Guillaumin", Bulletin of the Bourbonnais Emulation Society, t. 34, November–December 1931, p. 271-272 .
