= Lunette (disambiguation) =

A lunette is a moon-shaped architectural detail.

Lunette may also refer to:

- Lunette (fortification), an outwork consisting of a salient angle with two flanks and an open gorge
- Lunette (Gargoyles), a fictional character in the animated television series "Gargoyles"
- Lunette (geology), a wind-formed crescent dune shape
- Lunette (mechanical), a towing ring used with agricultural and military trailers
- Lunette (stele), the curved top region of a stele (pillar-shaped monument), especially from ancient Egypt
- Lunette Peak, a mountain on the border of the Canadian provinces of Alberta and British Columbia
- Lunette (liturgy), a holder for the Eucharistic host in the Roman Catholic and Anglo-Catholic churches
- Musée des Lunettes et Lorgnettes Pierre Marly, a museum of eyeglasses in Paris

== See also ==
- Lunula (disambiguation)
- Lune (disambiguation)
