= Lunula =

Lunula (Latin for "little moon") may refer to:

- Lunula (amulet), a Roman amulet worn by girls, the equivalent of the bulla worn by boys
- Gold lunula, a specific kind of archaeological solid collar or necklace from the Bronze Age or later
- Lunula, the crescent-moon decoration on an ancient Roman calceus senatorius
- Lunula (anatomy), the pale half-moon shape at the base of a fingernail
- Lunule (bivalve), a crescent-moon shaped area on the shells of some marine bivalves
- the gilded metal holder in a monstrance
- Calophasia lunula, a species of moth
- Chaetodon lunula, a species of butterflyfish
- The openings in the test of a sand dollar
- A set of rounded parentheses and the text within them

== See also ==
- Lunette (disambiguation)
- Lune (disambiguation)
