= Luning =

Luning or Lüning may refer to

Places

- Luning, Nevada, an unincorporated town in Mineral County, Nevada, United States
- Luning Formation, a geologic formation in Nevada, United States

Surname

- Henry Luning (1905–1965), American Olympic swimmer
- Hermann Lüning (1814–1874), German philologist
- J.C. Luning (1863–1928), Mayor of Leesburg, Florida, United States
- Örjan Lüning (1919–1995), Swedish philatelist
