= André Gill =

French caricaturist (1840–1885)

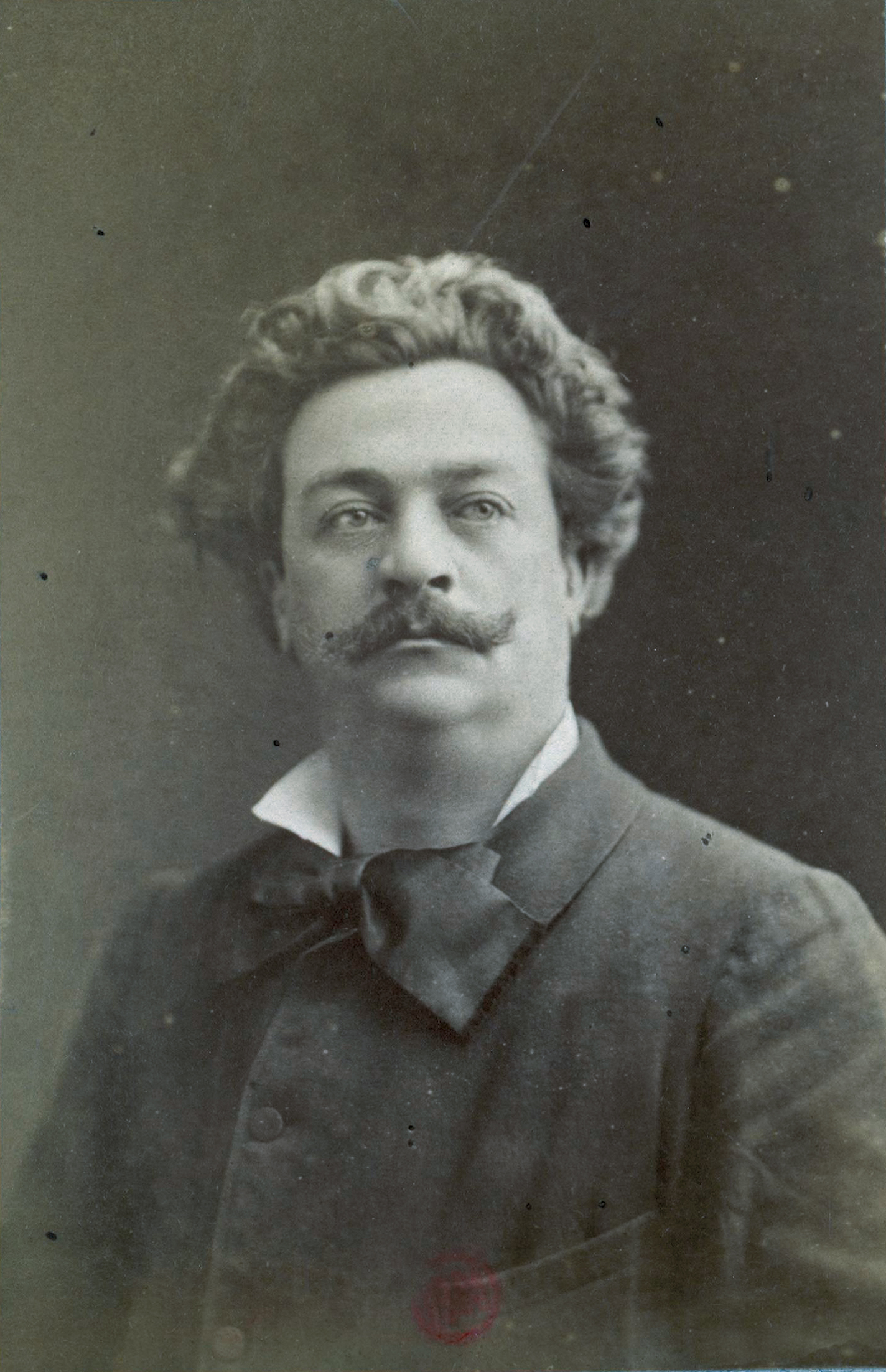
André Gill by Nadar (1910)

André Gill (17 October 1840 – 1 May 1885) was a French caricaturist. Born Louis-Alexandre Gosset de Guînes at Paris, the son of the Comte de Guînes and Sylvie-Adeline Gosset, Gill studied at the Royal Academy of Painting and Sculpture. He adopted the pseudonym André Gill in homage to his hero, James Gillray. Gill began illustrating for Le Journal Amusant, but he became known for his work for the weekly four-sheet newspaper La Lune, edited by Francis Polo, in which he drew portraits for a series entitled The Man of the Day. He worked for La Lune from 1865 to 1868. When La Lune was banned, he worked for the periodical L'Éclipse from 1868 to 1876. Gill also drew for famous periodical Le Charivari.

== Caricatures ==
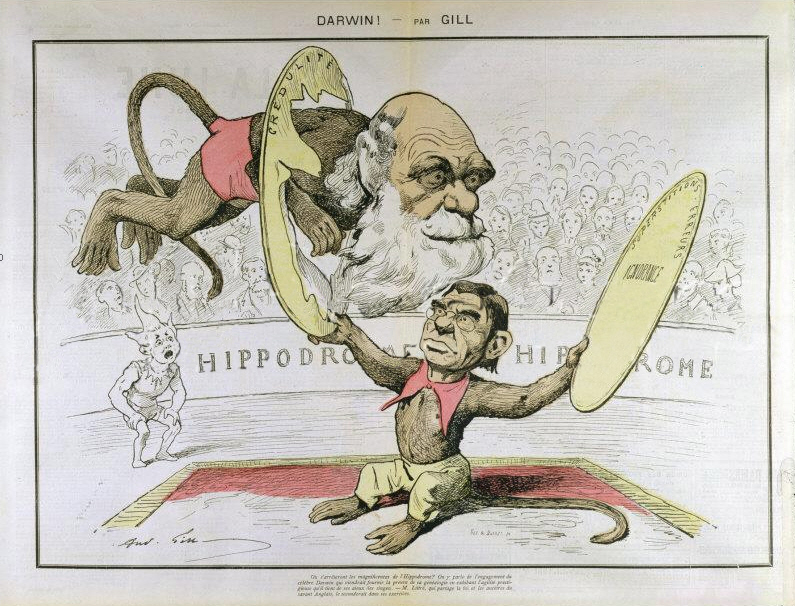
Caricature of Émile Littré and Charles Darwin depicted as performing monkeys breaking through gullibility ("credulité"), superstitions, errors, and ignorance, by André Gill.

Gill's style, subsequently much imitated, was noted for the enlargement of his subjects' heads, which sat upon undersized bodies. His caricatures, in the form of large hand-colored, lithographic portraits, were considered very accurate and not very cruel. Thus, many of Gill's famous contemporaries wished to be drawn by him. Gill drew portrait caricatures of Sarah Bernhardt, Otto von Bismarck, Émile Zola, Victor Hugo, Nadar, Giuseppe Garibaldi, Adelina Patti, Charles Dickens, and Richard Wagner.

Napoleon III disliked the portrait of him drawn by Gill. In December 1867, La Lune was censored. "La Lune will have to undergo an eclipse," an authority commented to Editor Francis Polo when the ban was instituted, unwittingly dubbing Polo's subsequent publication: L'Éclipse, which made its first appearance on 9 August 1868. Gill would contribute caricatures to this successor of La Lune as well.

In 1868, Gill faced a lawsuit after drawing a pumpkin that was believed by the magistrates to represent the head of a judge. Ever since Charles Philipon had drawn a pear to represent Louis Philippe, any fruit drawn by caricaturists was believed to carry satirical value and was suspect in the eyes of the court. Gill's lawsuit brought him fame –as well as a prison sentence. He was, however, released after a short time.

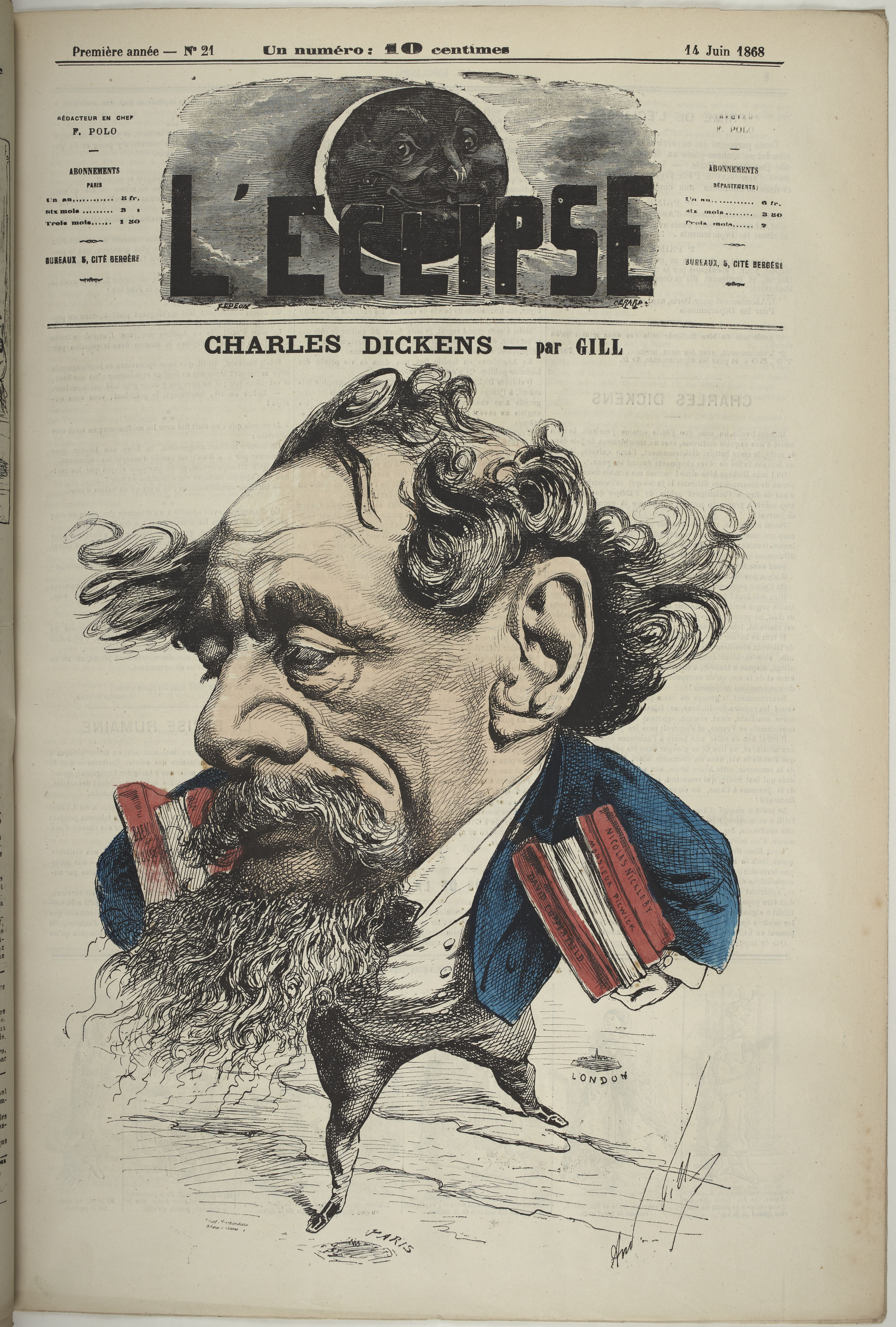
Charles Dickens by André Gill. Hand-colored engraving published in L'Eclipse newspaper, 14 June 1868; Dickens crossing the Channel with his books.

His fame won him entry into the bohemian artistic world of Paris; Gill met Charles Cros and Paul Verlaine. During a trip to Paris, Rimbaud, who admired Gill's drawings from L'Éclipse, stopped at the caricaturist's house. Gill found the poet prostrate on a settee. After Rimbaud explained himself, Gill gave him some money and advised him to leave Paris before war erupted.

In September 1871, Gill caricatured the statesman Adolphe Thiers, who became his favorite target in L'Éclipse, which had resumed publication in June 1871. In 1872, his work for this paper became regular. In an 1873 attack against the government's censorship of his work, Gill drew "L'Enterrement de la caricature" ("The Funeral of Caricature") in which an artist follows a hearse that carries a dog holding a pen and a paintbrush. In 1875, he drew "Le journaliste et l'avenir" ("The Journalist and the Future"), in which a journalist is depicted bound and gagged.

L'Éclipse, which disappeared after 1876, was replaced by the periodical La Lune rousse ("The Red Moon") (1876–1879), of which Gill served as the editor. Refusing to engage in any continuous political struggle, he quarreled with his old friend Jules Vallès. Gill preferred the bohemian life and its excesses.

On 29 July 1881, France changed its censorship laws, allowing that "any newspaper or periodic writing can be published, without preliminary authorization and deposit of guarantee." Gill, however, was not able to enjoy these new journalistic freedoms as he was forced to enter a psychiatric hospital.

== Other activities ==
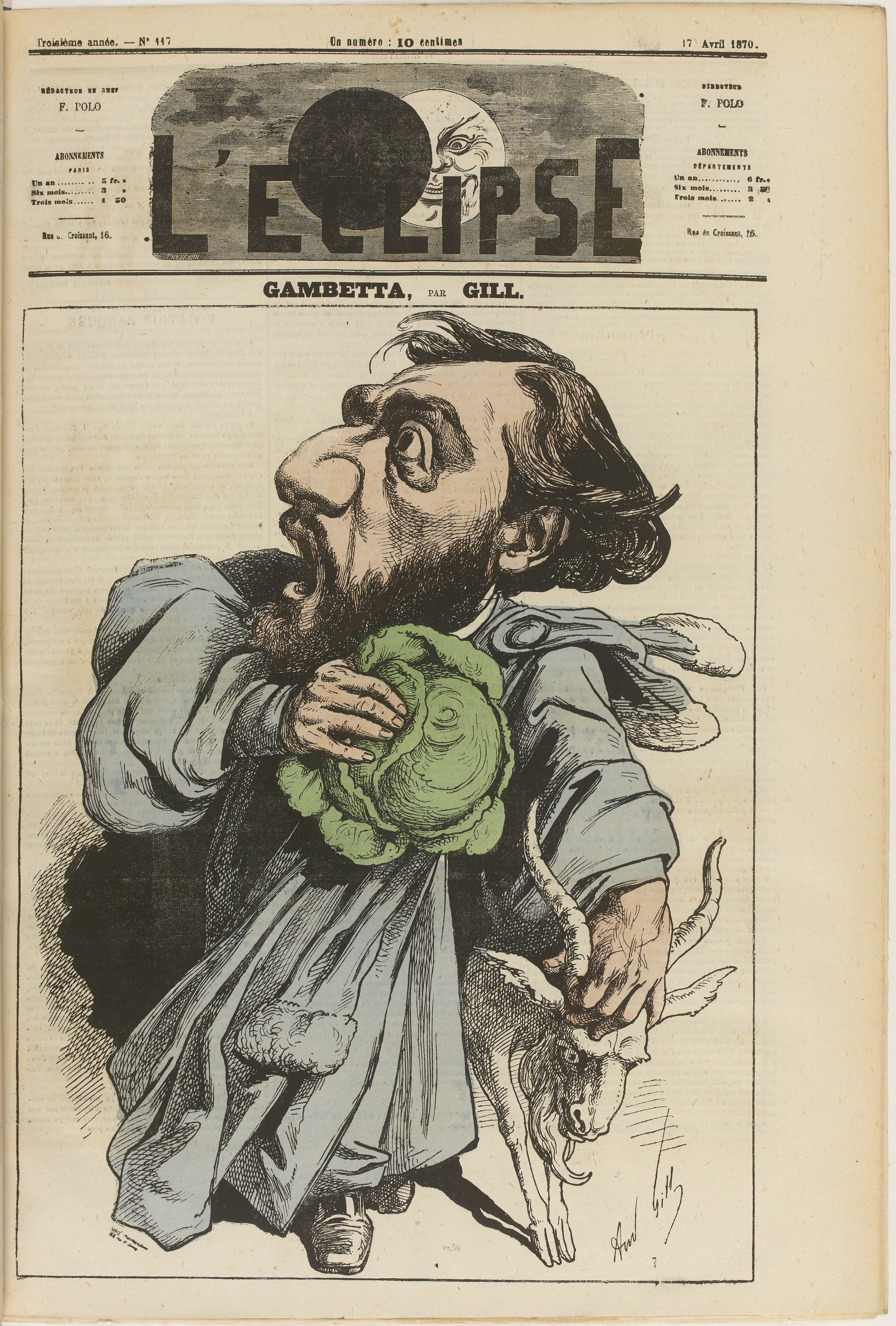
Léon Gambetta, 17 April 1870.

Gill was named curator of the Musée du Luxembourg on 15 May 1871, in which capacity he reassembled the scattered collections of art and reestablished the museum of sculpture. He had scarcely begun his work when it was interrupted by the upheaval associated with the Paris Commune.

Gill became involved in the Paris Commune. During this conflict, he illustrated for Jules Vallès' socialist paper, La Rue.

In 1870, Gustave Courbet established a "Federation of Artists" for the free and uncensored expansion of art. The group's members included Gill, Honoré Daumier, Jean-Baptiste-Camille Corot, Eugène Pottier, Jules Dalou, and Manet.

In 1875, Gill painted the sign that was to suggest the name of the famous night-club Lapin Agile. It was a picture of a rabbit jumping out of a saucepan, and locals began calling their neighborhood night-club "Le Lapin à Gill": "Gill's rabbit". Over time, this name evolved into "Lapin Agile", or "Nimble Rabbit". The sign can still be seen outside the night-club in Rue des Saules, Montmartre, Paris.

== Death ==
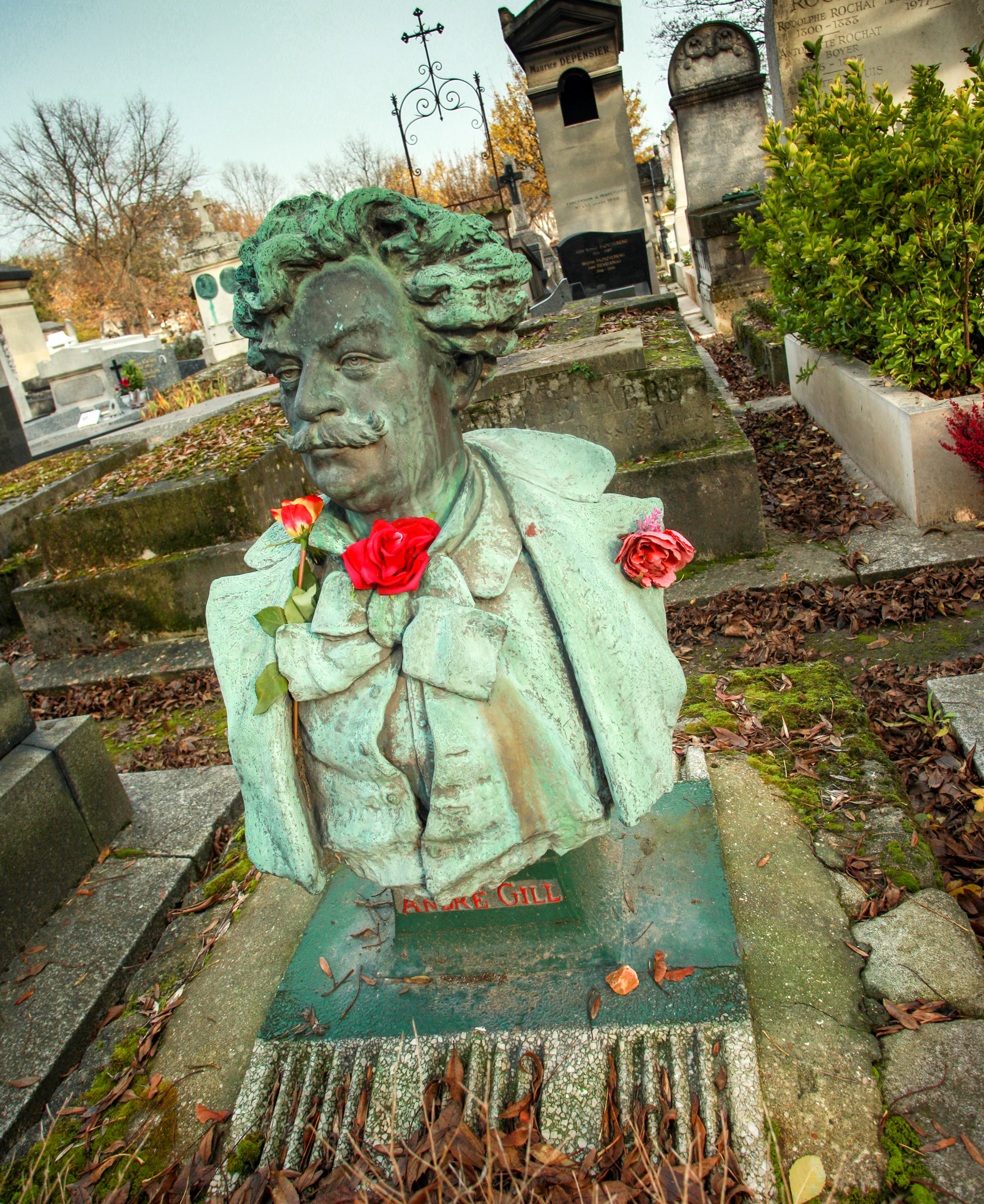
Grave at Père Lachaise Cemetery, Paris

Gill succumbed in 1880 to mental illness and died five years later, May Day, 1885, at the asylum of Charenton with only Emile Cohl, friend and colleague, at his side. His other friends and the public overall, had deserted him. Charenton asylum had famously served as the home of the Marquis de Sade.

The small Rue André Gill (perpendicular to the Rue des Martyrs), in the Montmartre district of Paris, is named after him. His bust is situated at the end of the street. In 2000, the bust was found reversed; it has since been restored. The Hotel André Gill is also located on this street.

== Gallery ==
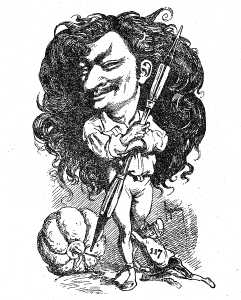
André Gill, self-portrait.

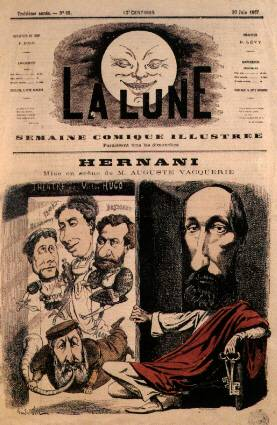
Cover of La Lune, illustrated by Gill, 1867.

Bust of Gill on the Rue André Gill.

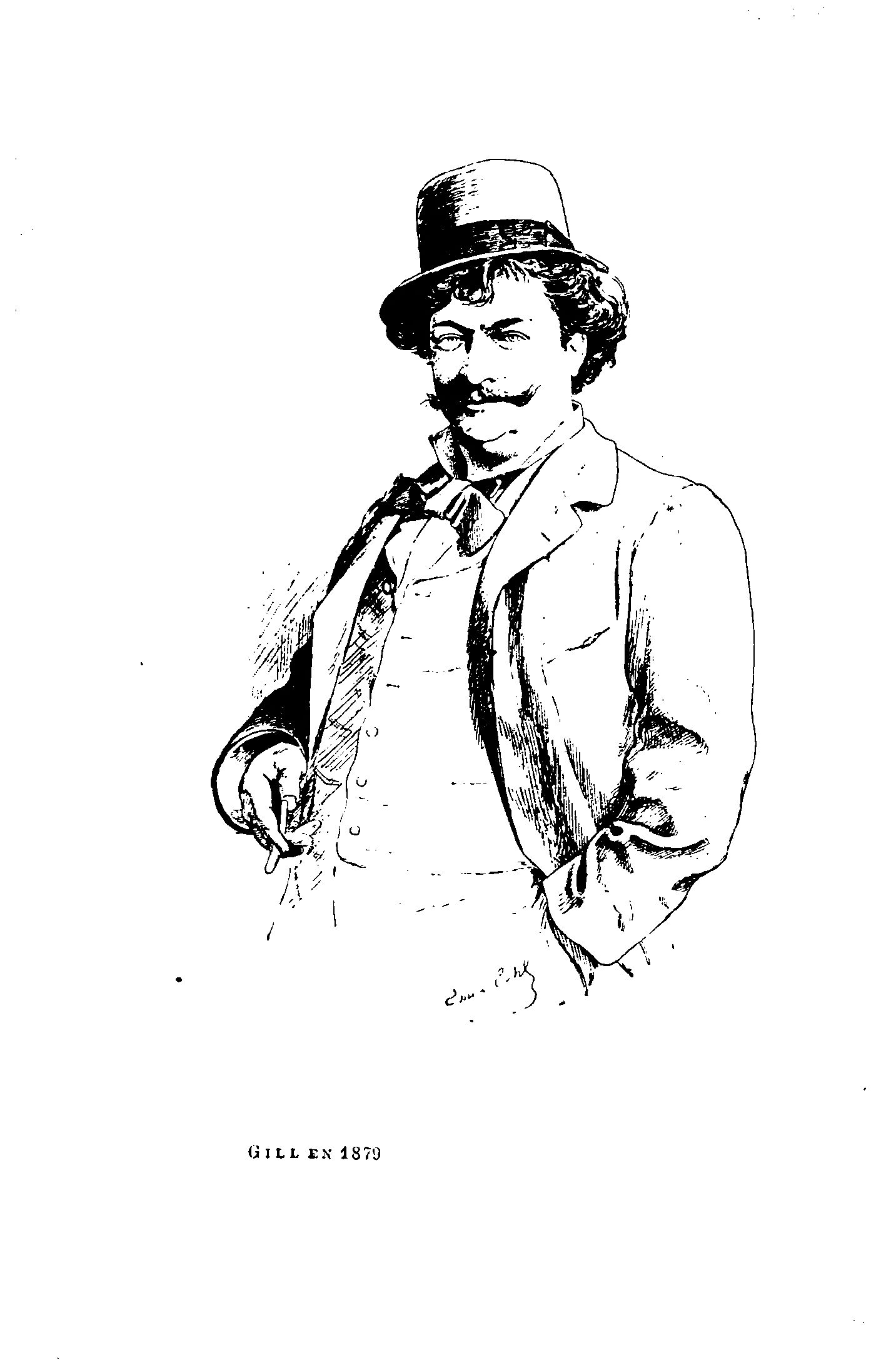
Portrait of Gill by Émile Cohl, 1879.
