= L'Éclipse =

19th Century French magazine

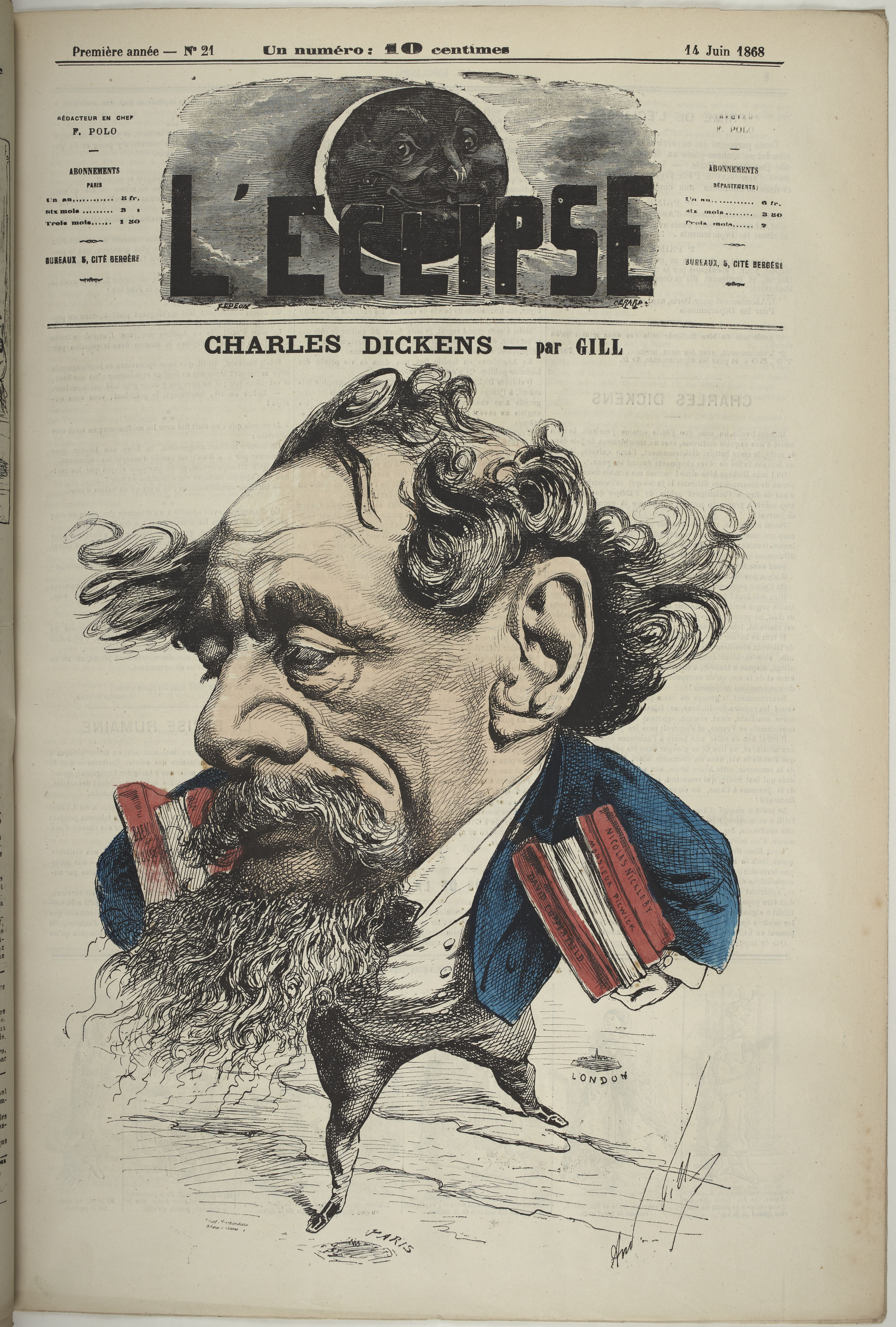
L'Eclipse 14 June 1868. Charles Dickens by André Gill Dickens crosses the Channel, carrying his books from London to Paris.

L'Éclipse was a French magazine of the nineteenth century, appearing from 1868 to 1919. Edited by Francis Polo, L'Éclipse was a showcase for the illustrator André Gill, in which he drew caricatures of his illustrious contemporaries.

Napoleon III disliked the portrait of him drawn by Gill in La Lune. In December 1867, the journal was censored. "La Lune will have to undergo an eclipse," an authority commented to Editor Francis Polo when the ban was instituted, unwittingly dubbing Polo's subsequent publication: L'Eclipse, which made its first appearance on 9 August 1868.

L'Éclipse would itself suffer from twenty-two seizures by the law. It consisted only of one page, due to governmental restrictions.

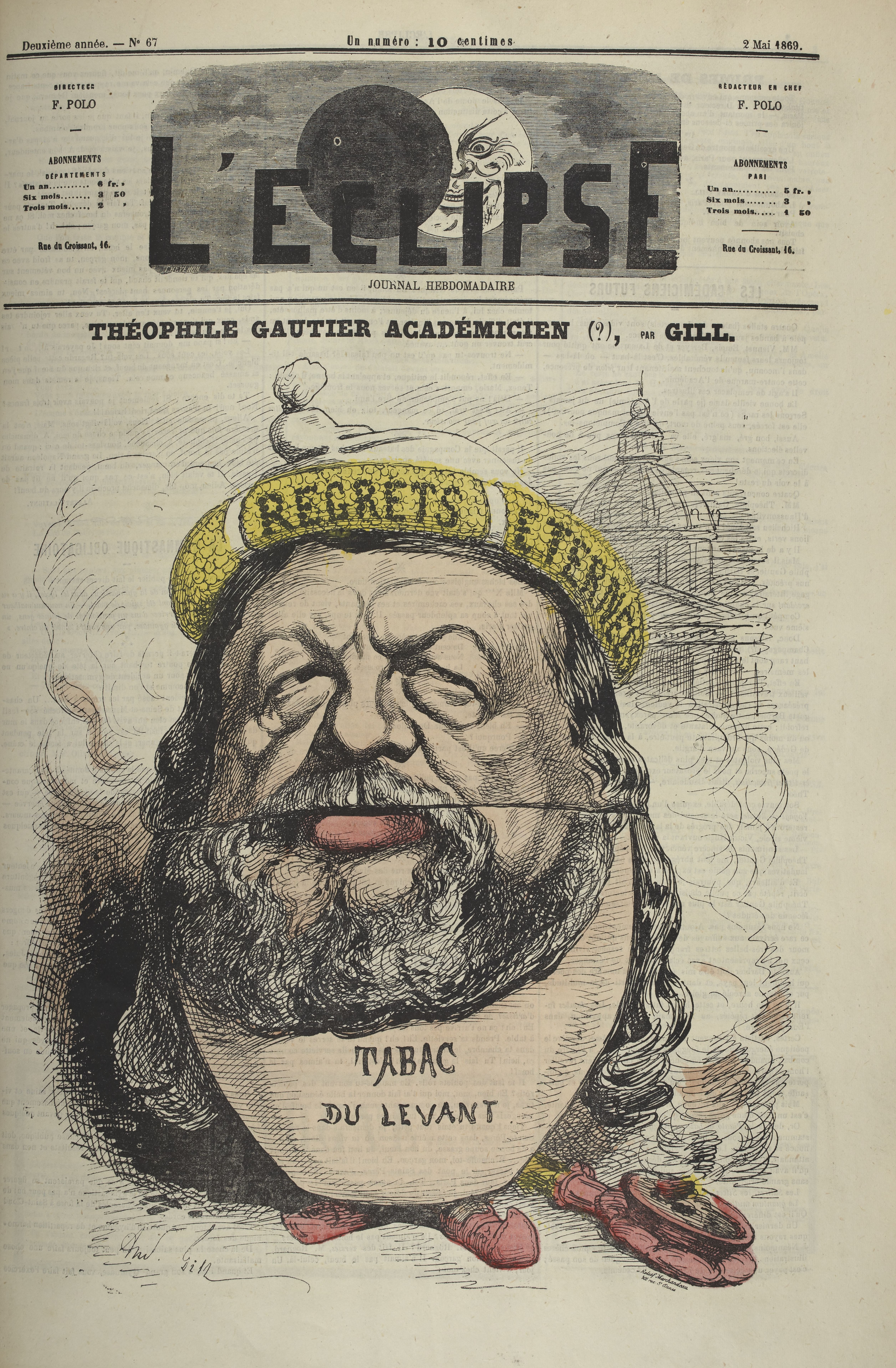
Caricature of Théophile Gautie, 5 April 1868

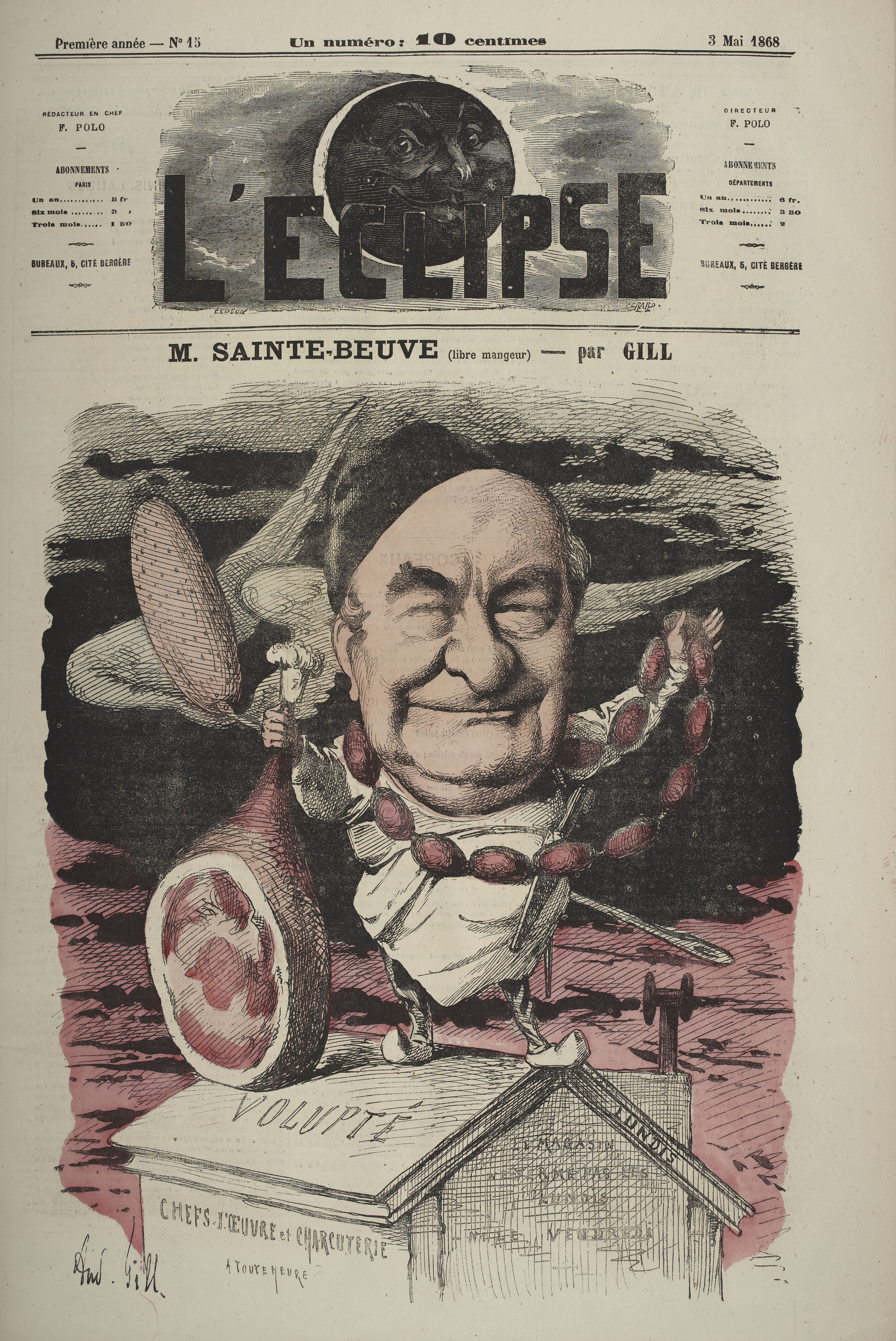
Sainte-Beuve, 1868

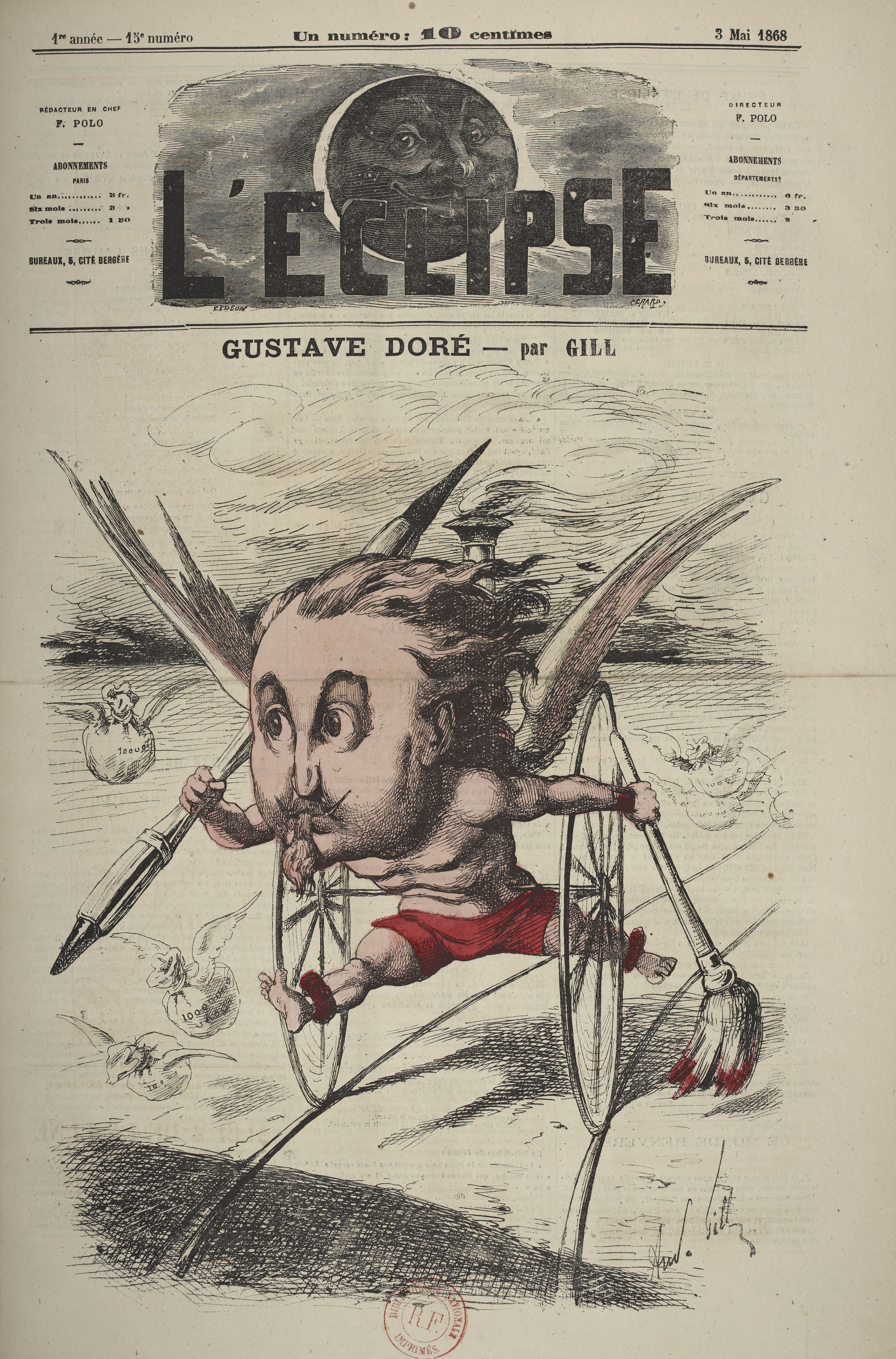
Caricature of Gustave Doré, 1868

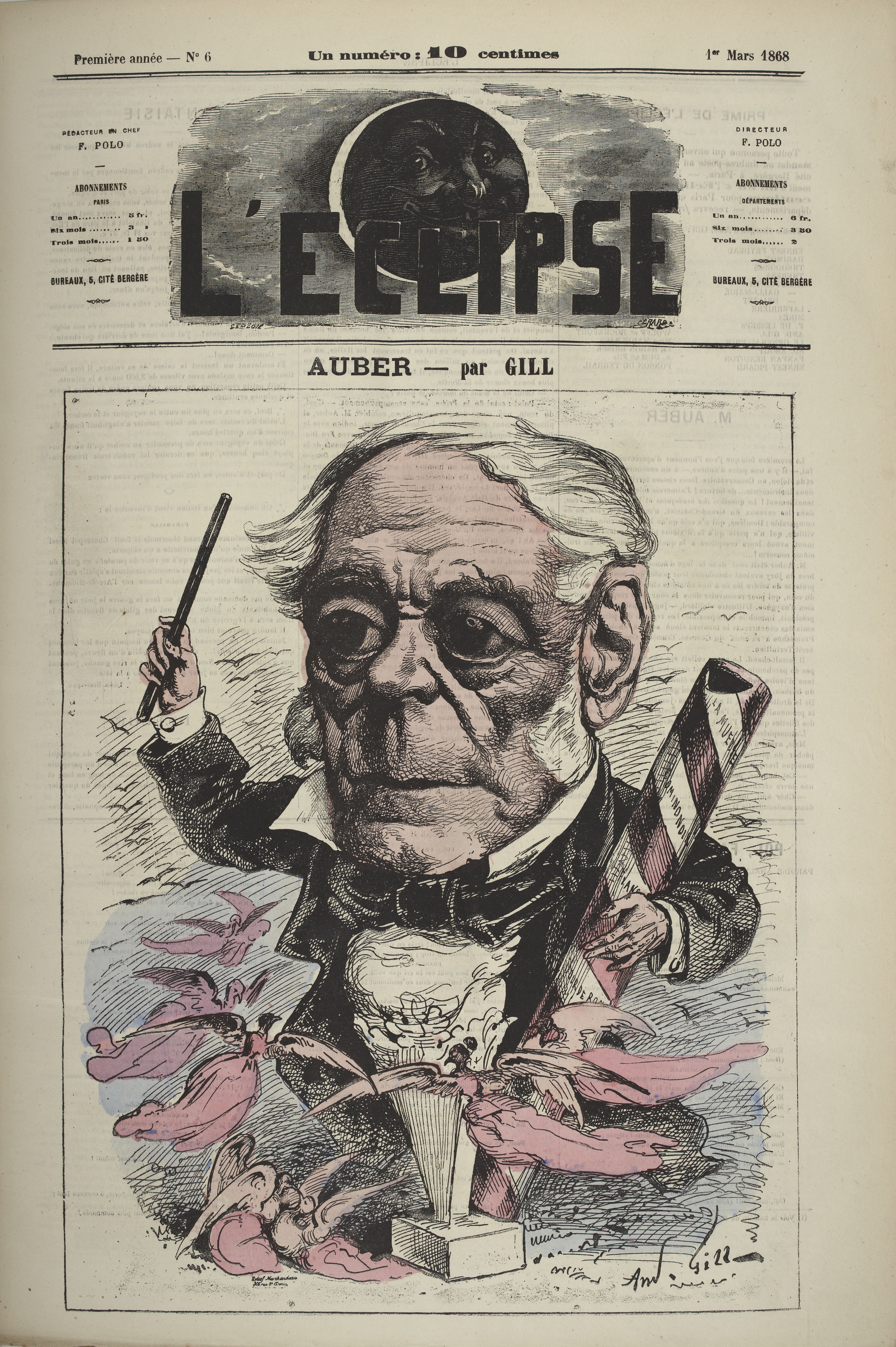
Caricature of Auber, 1868

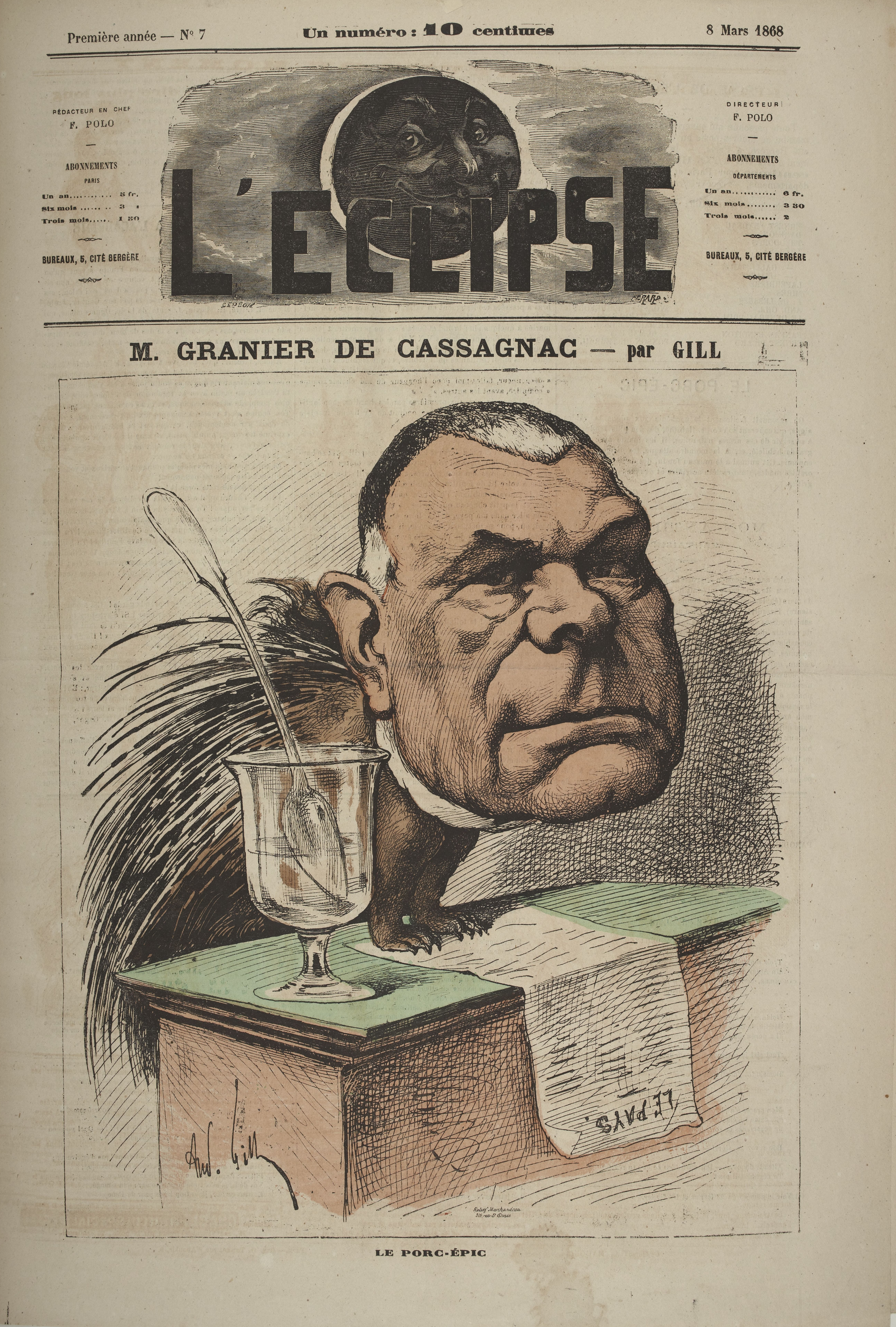
Caricature of Adolphe Granier, 1868

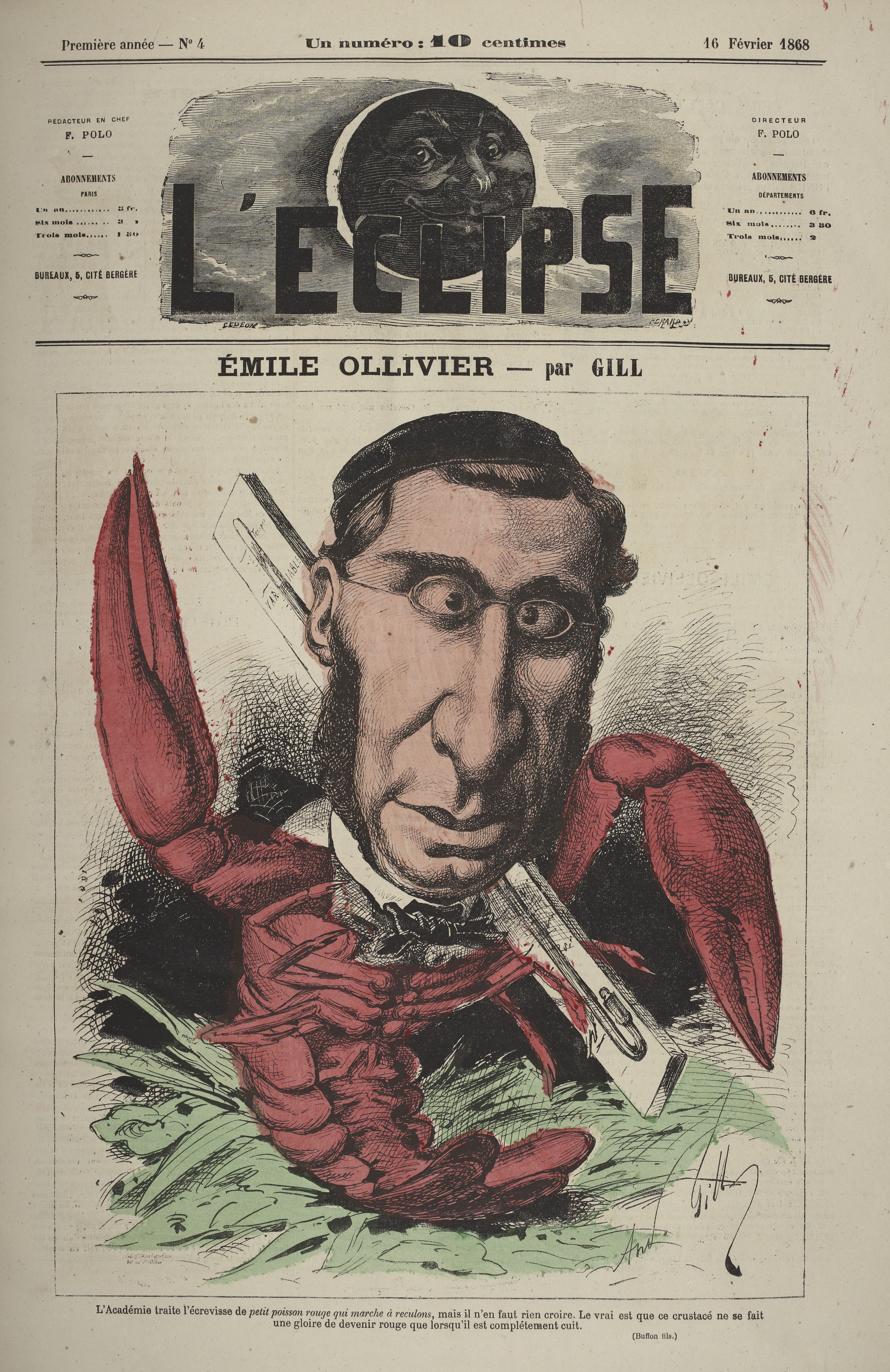
Caricature of Émile Ollivier, 1868

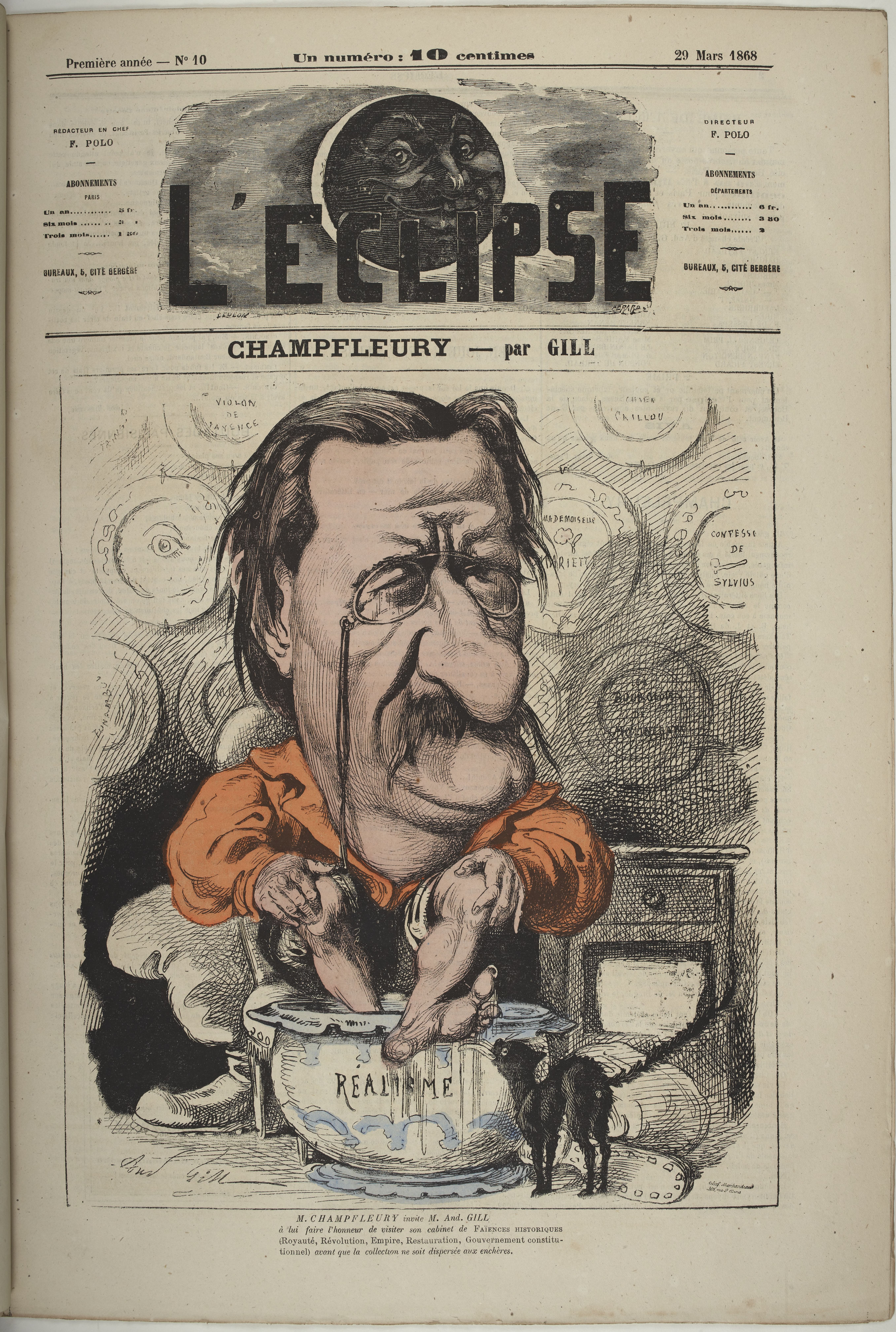
« Champfleury » 1868

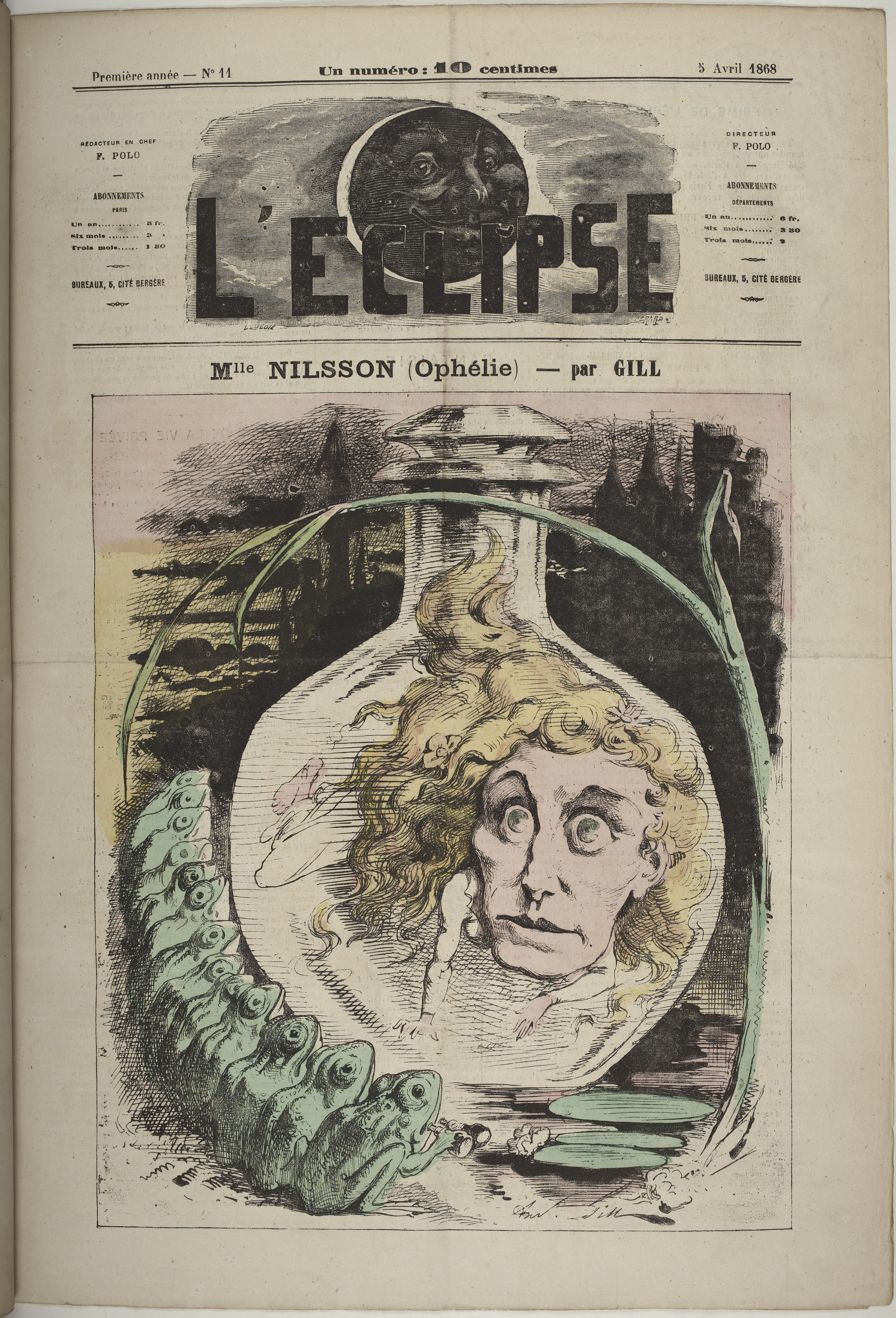
Caricature of Christina Nilsson as Ophelia, 5 April 1868

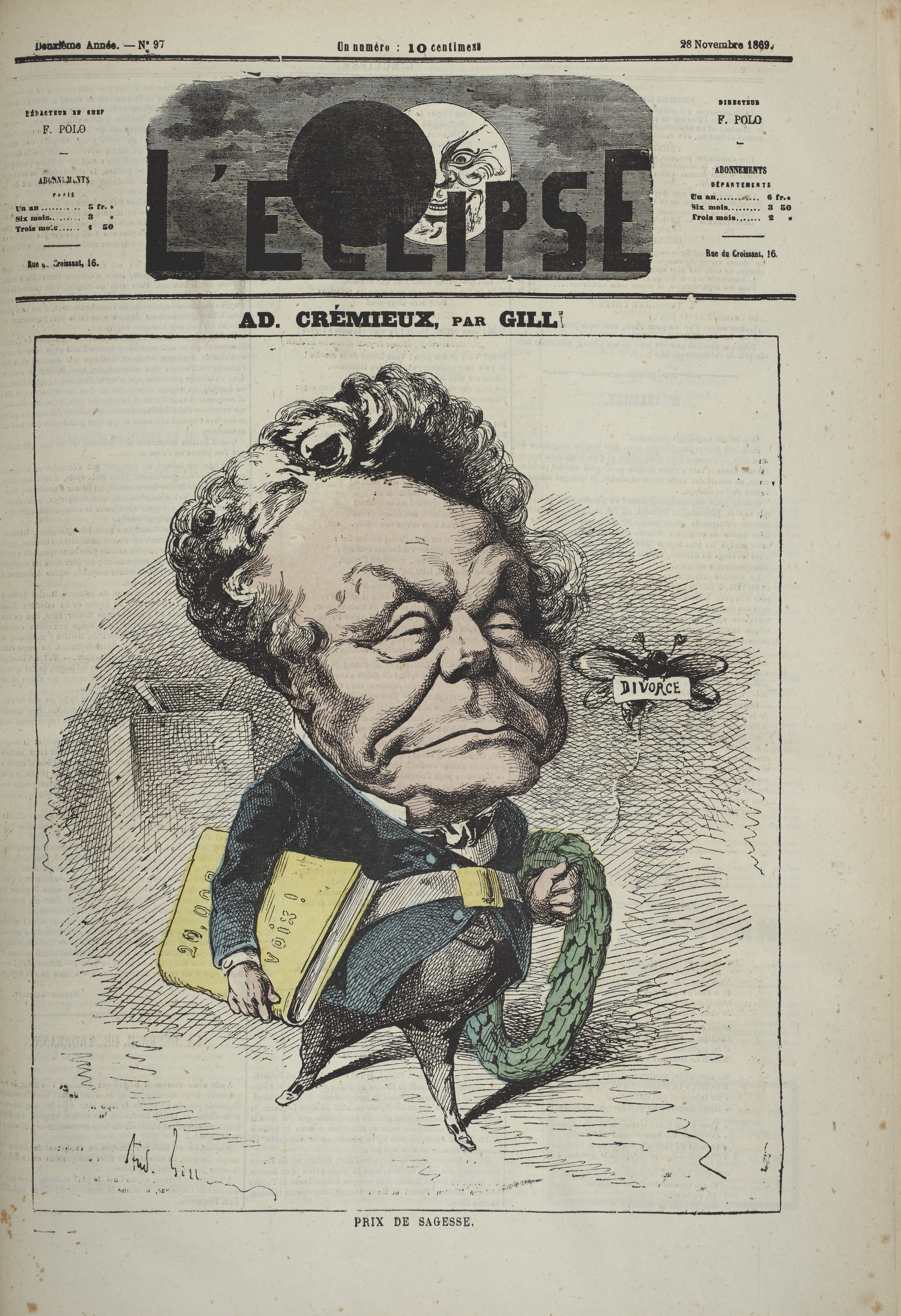
Caricature of Adolphe Crémieux, 1869

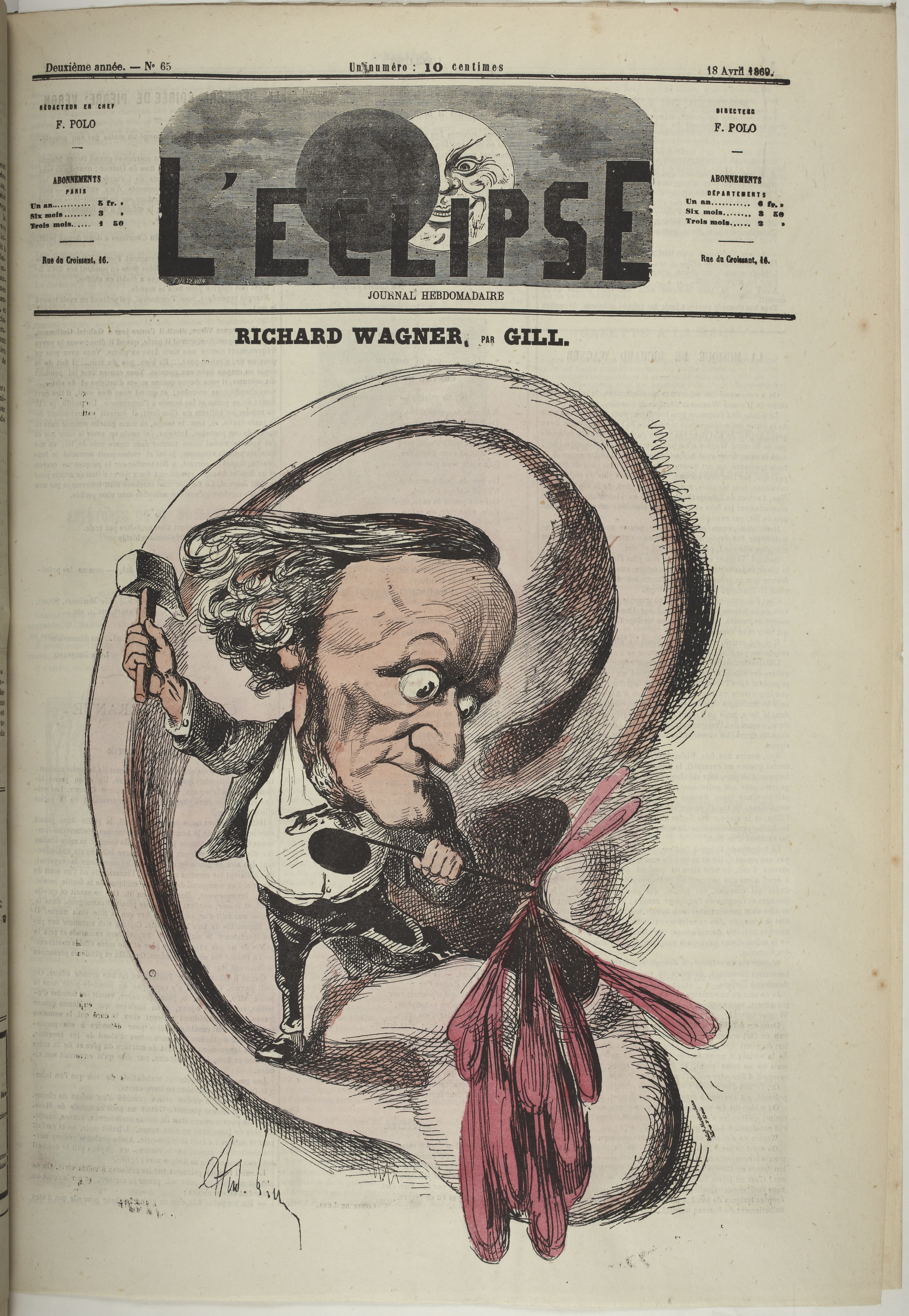
Caricature of Richard Wagner, 18 April 1869

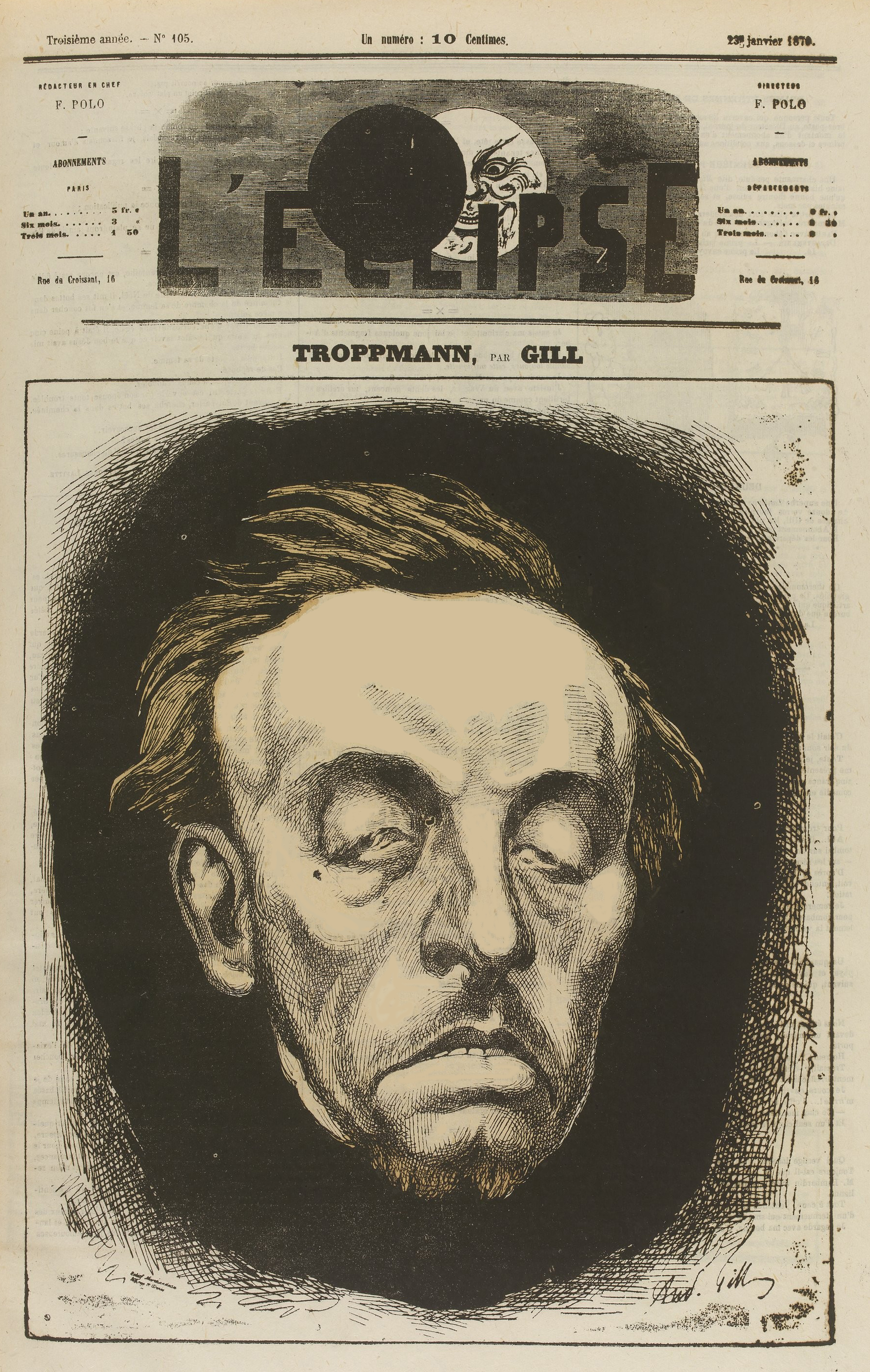
Jean-Baptiste Troppmann, 23 January 1870

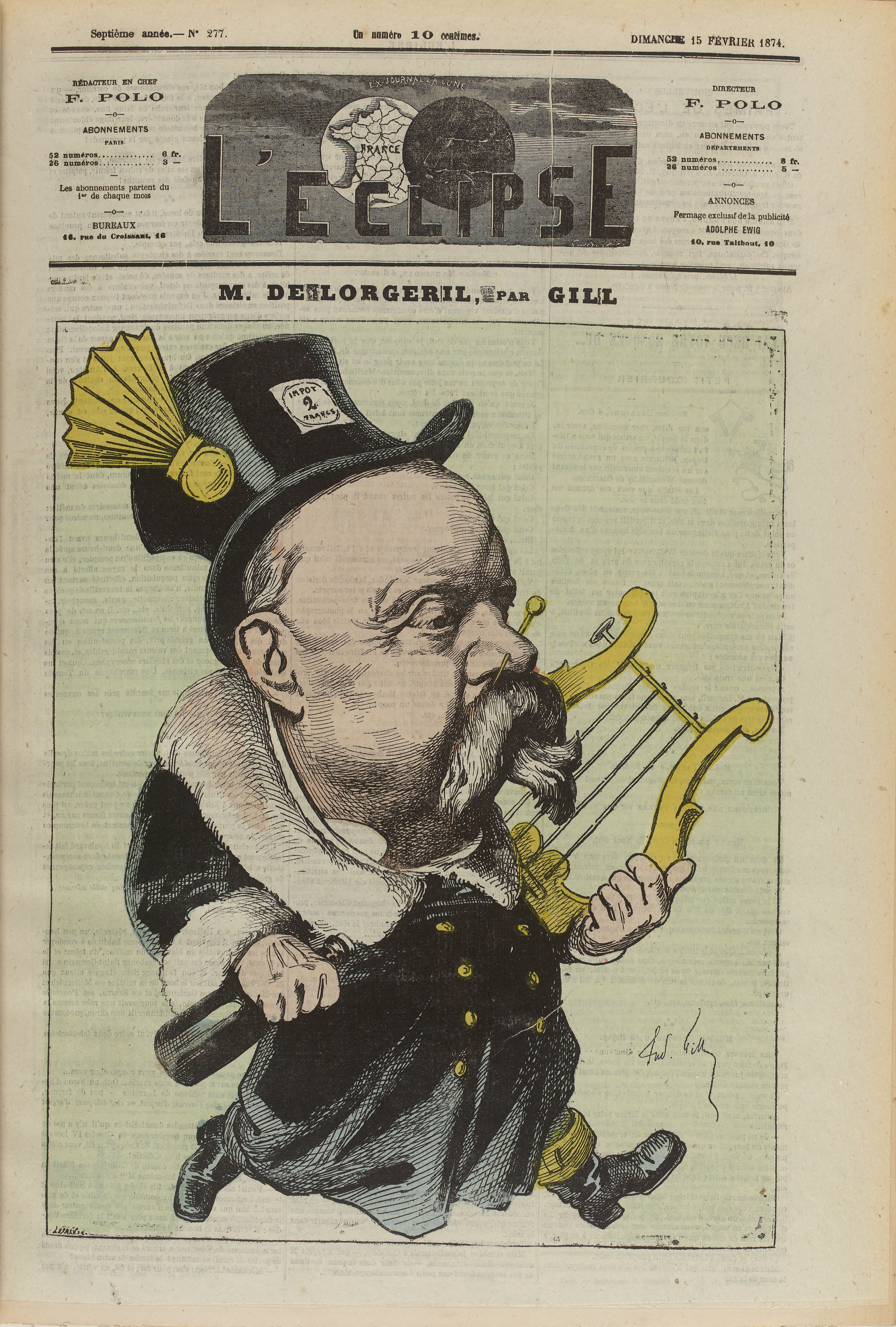
Caricature of Hippolyte de Lorgeril, 1874

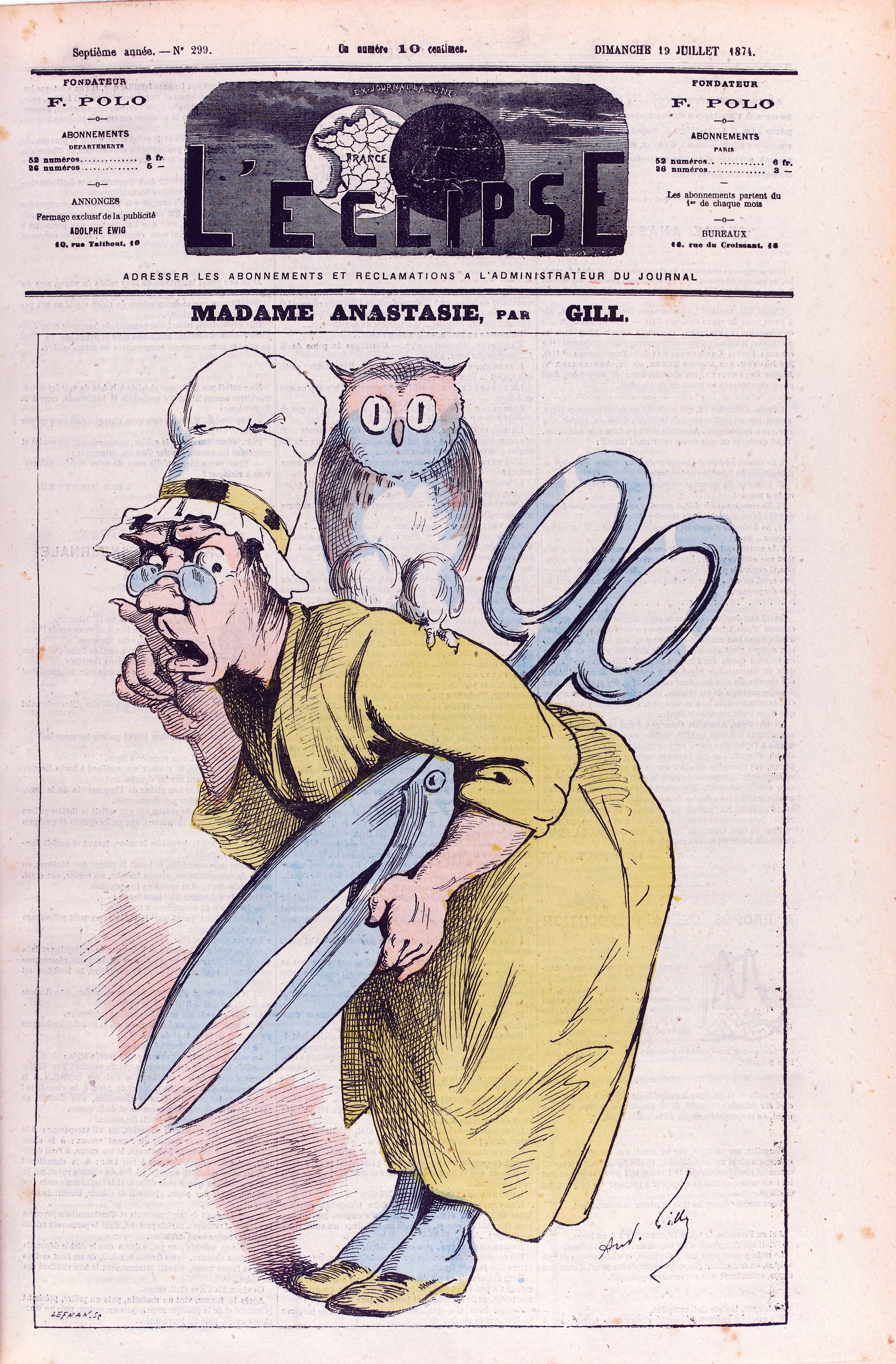
Madame Anastasie d’André Gill. 1874
