= Lune (ship) =

Several vessels have been named Lune.

- French ship Lune was a ship of the line of the French Navy launched in 1641. She foundered on 8 November 1664.
- Lune (1794 ship) was launched in 1794 at New Brunswick, possibly under another name. She first appeared in British records in 1798. She made once complete voyage as a slave ship in the triangular trade in enslaved people. A French privateer captured her in 1800 early in her second voyage before she reached Africa.
- Lune (1799 ship) was launched in 1799 at Lancaster and traded regularly as a West Indiaman. Lune first appeared in Lloyd's Register (LR) in 1799. Captain James Moon acquired a letter of marque on 17 September 1799. It showed her as being of 345 tons burthen, having a crew of 35 men, and carrying four 24-pounder and 16 9-pounder cannons. In 1817 Daniel Bennett purchased Lune to sail her as a whaler. Between 1817 and 1819 she made one voyage to the British southern whale fishery. Captain William Coffin sailed from London on 20 September 1817, bound for the southern whale fishery. In late 1818 Lune was at Desolation Island. At some point Captain George Woodward replaced William Coffin. Homeward bound, Lune, Woodward, master, was at Saint Helena on 18 May 1819, and sailed for London on 20 May. Lune, Woodman, master, arrived back at Gravesend on 21 July with 450 casks of whale oil. She was broken up in 1820.
- PS Lune (1892) was a paddle steamer passenger vessel that the Lancashire and Yorkshire Railway operated from 1892 to 1913. From 1913 to 1919 she served Cosens & Co Ltd as PS Melcombe Regis. She was laid up in 1919 and was scrapped in 1923/4 at Felixstowe.
- HMS Lune (1930) was a former fishing trawler of that name hired in 1939 as an auxiliary minesweeper. In 1944 she was redesignated a "wreck dispersal vessel" and purchased by the Admiralty. In 1946 Lune returned to commercial fishing, subsequently as Loch Lomond. She was wrecked on 23 October 1952 in Aberdeen harbour.

== See also ==
- Empire Lune
