= Hermann Lüning =

German philologist (1814–1874)

Hermann L. Lüning (German: [ˈlynɪŋ]; 5 November 1814 – 12 August 1874), was a German philologist, known for his edition of the Poetic Edda (1859), which Jacob Grimm's letter to Lüning praised as "the first important gift Germany has brought to Iceland." It was also the principal edition that Benjamin Thorpe consulted for his English translation of the Edda (1866).

== Life ==
Born in Gütersloh, Westphalia, he attended gymnasium in Bielefeld when his father relocated to Schildesche. Enrolling in the University of Greifswald in 1833 to study theology, he fraternized with the son of the poet Kosegarten, becoming engrossed in the study of Oriental languages, and likewise with Schömann dabbling in Classical Studies. In the crackdown of Burschenschaften fraternities following the foiled Frankfurter Wachensturm, he was incarcerated for six weeks. He took up a position as a tutor for a country squire in the then Grand Duchy of Posen. In 1837 he went to Breslau, again arrested, and taken to Fort Silberberg in Silesia (now Srebrna Góra, Poland). (Note: Just as Fritz Reuter's confinement at the fort was ending.) For participating in a circle of men engaging in liberal political discourse, he received a sentence of six years and served three, spending the time studying Old German.

Released by pardon in 1840 when Frederick William IV assumed the throne, he went to Halle to resume his scholarly pursuit, but when he attempted to take the exam to qualify as secondary school teacher (German: Oberlehrer), he was expelled from the premises by the police. After a stint as journalist and amateur scholar back in Bielefeld, he went to Zürich, Switzerland, where in 1845 he obtained a position at a private institute, and in 1848 appointed instructor in German Language and History at the canton secondary school (German: Kantonsschule), where he served until his death.

== Works ==
- Lüning, Hermann (1853). Schulgrammatik der neuhochdeutschen Sprache. Frauenfeld: Verlags-Comptoir.
- Lüning, Hermann (1859). Die Edda : eine Sammlung altnordischer Götter- und Heldenlieder. Zürich: Meyer & Zeller.
