= La Lune =

Napoleon III as the character Rocambole Portrait authentique de Rocambole Published in La Lune November 17, 1867

La Lune ("The Moon") was the name of a nineteenth-century French weekly four-sheet newspaper edited by Francis Polo. The illustrator André Gill became known for his work for this journal, in which he drew caricatures for a series entitled The Man of the Day.

Napoléon III disliked the portrait of him drawn by Gill. In December 1867, the journal was censored. "La Lune will have to undergo an eclipse," an authority commented to the editor Polo when the ban was instituted, unwittingly dubbing Polo's subsequent publication: L'Éclipse, which made its first appearance on 9 August 1868. Gill would contribute caricatures to this successor of La Lune as well.

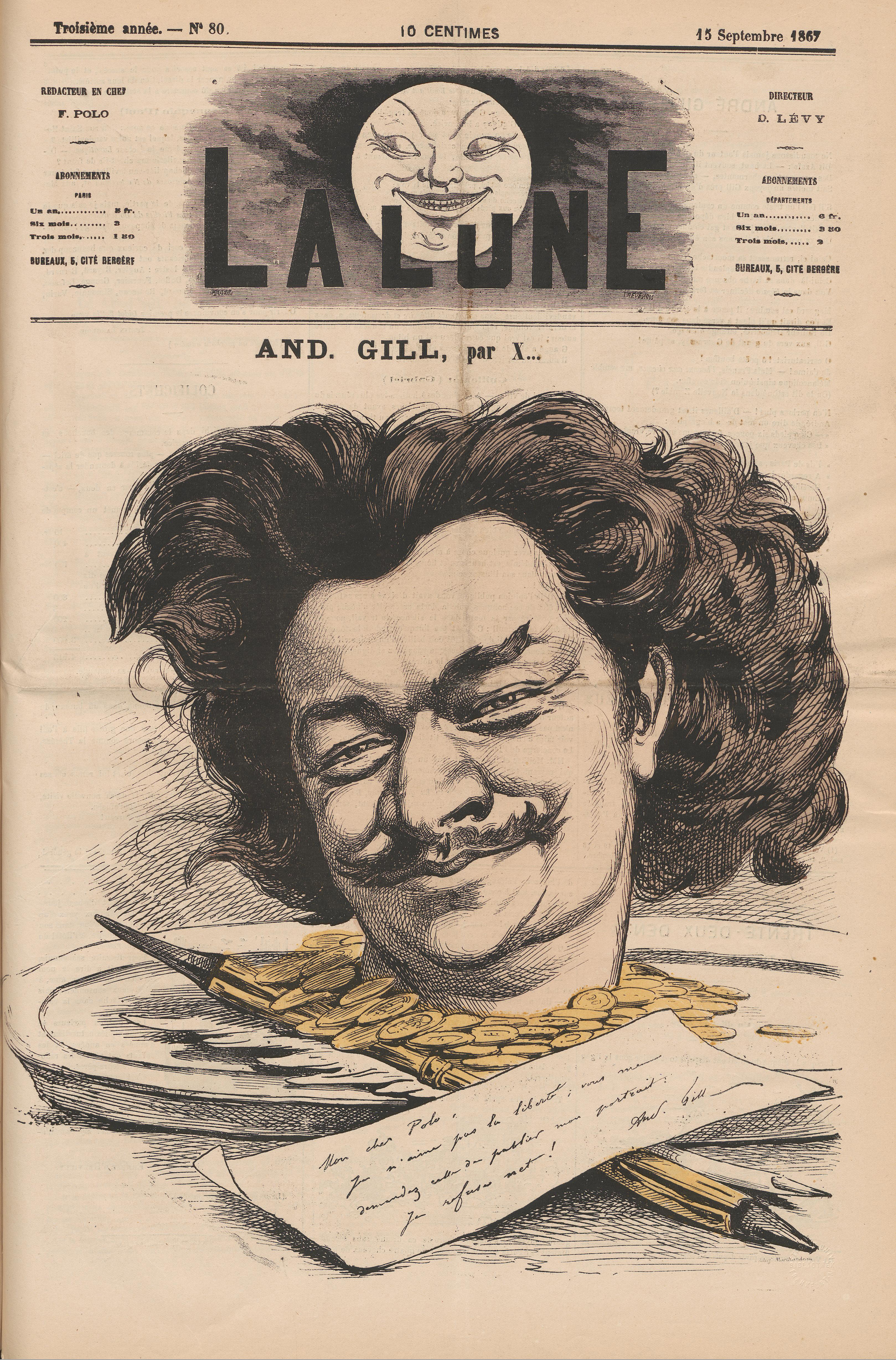
Self-Caricature of André Gill, Cover of La Lune 15 September 1867

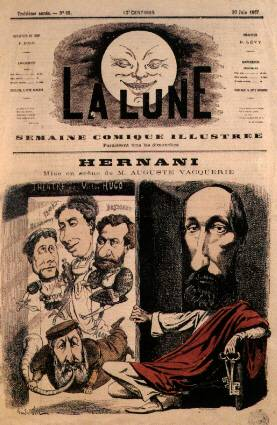
Cover of La Lune, illustrated by André Gill, 1867.

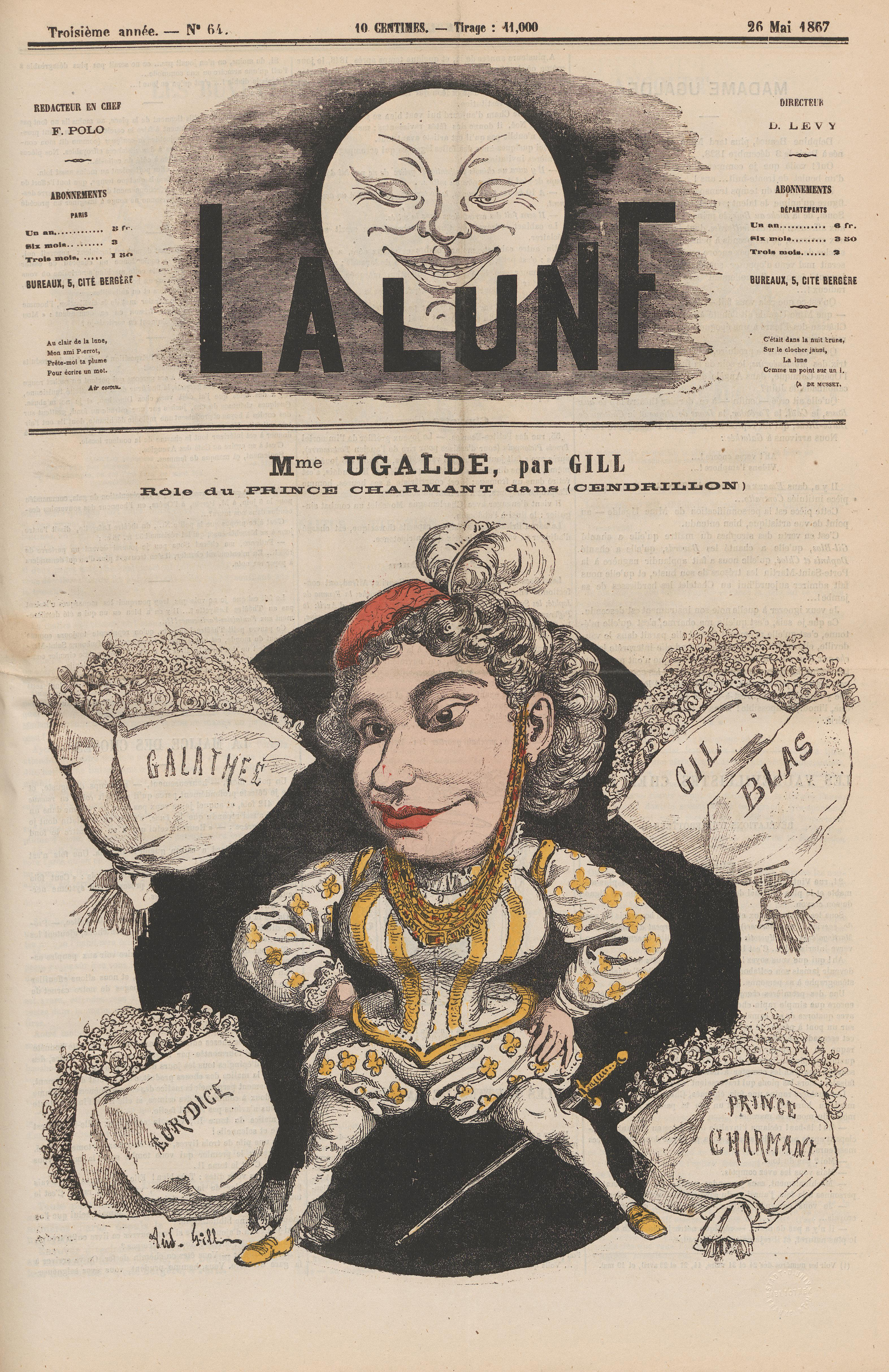
Delphine Ugalde, 26 May 1867

== Sources ==
- (in English) Covers of La Lune by André Gill
- (in English) Andre Gill
- (in French) Frères Goncourt: Gill
