= June Middleton =

Australian polio survivor (1926–2009)

- Born: June Margaret Middleton; 4 May 1926; Melbourne, Victoria, Australia
- Died: 30 October 2009 (aged 83); Thornbury, Victoria, Australia
- Known for: Formerly longest time in an iron lung

June Margaret Middleton (4 May 1926 – 30 October 2009) was an Australian polio survivor who spent more than 60 years living in an iron lung for treatment of the disease. In 2006, Guinness World Records recognised her as the person who had spent the longest amount of time living in an iron lung. This record has since been surpassed by American lawyer Paul Alexander and Martha Lillard.

== Biography ==
Middleton was born in Melbourne on 4 May 1926, the only daughter of Robert and Lucy Middleton. She contracted polio when she was 22, just months before her planned wedding. She entered the iron lung on 5 April 1949, and remained dependent on the machine for the rest of her life. Middleton spent up to 21 hours a day in the iron lung to help her breathe. Her husband-to-be stayed with her for five years before eventually marrying another woman and starting a family.

Middleton lived at Fairfield Hospital in Melbourne for more than 40 years. She was then transferred to Austin Hospital before moving to her own home in Thornbury, which was managed by the Yooralla Ventilator Accommodation Support Service.

A campaigner for the rights of people confined to ventilators, Middleton was also a fan of the Carlton Football Club.

On 5 April 2009, Middleton marked her 60th year in the iron lung with friends and her dog Angel at her side.

She died in Thornbury, Victoria, on 29 October 2009, aged 83.
