= Iron lung =

Negative-pressure mechanical respirator

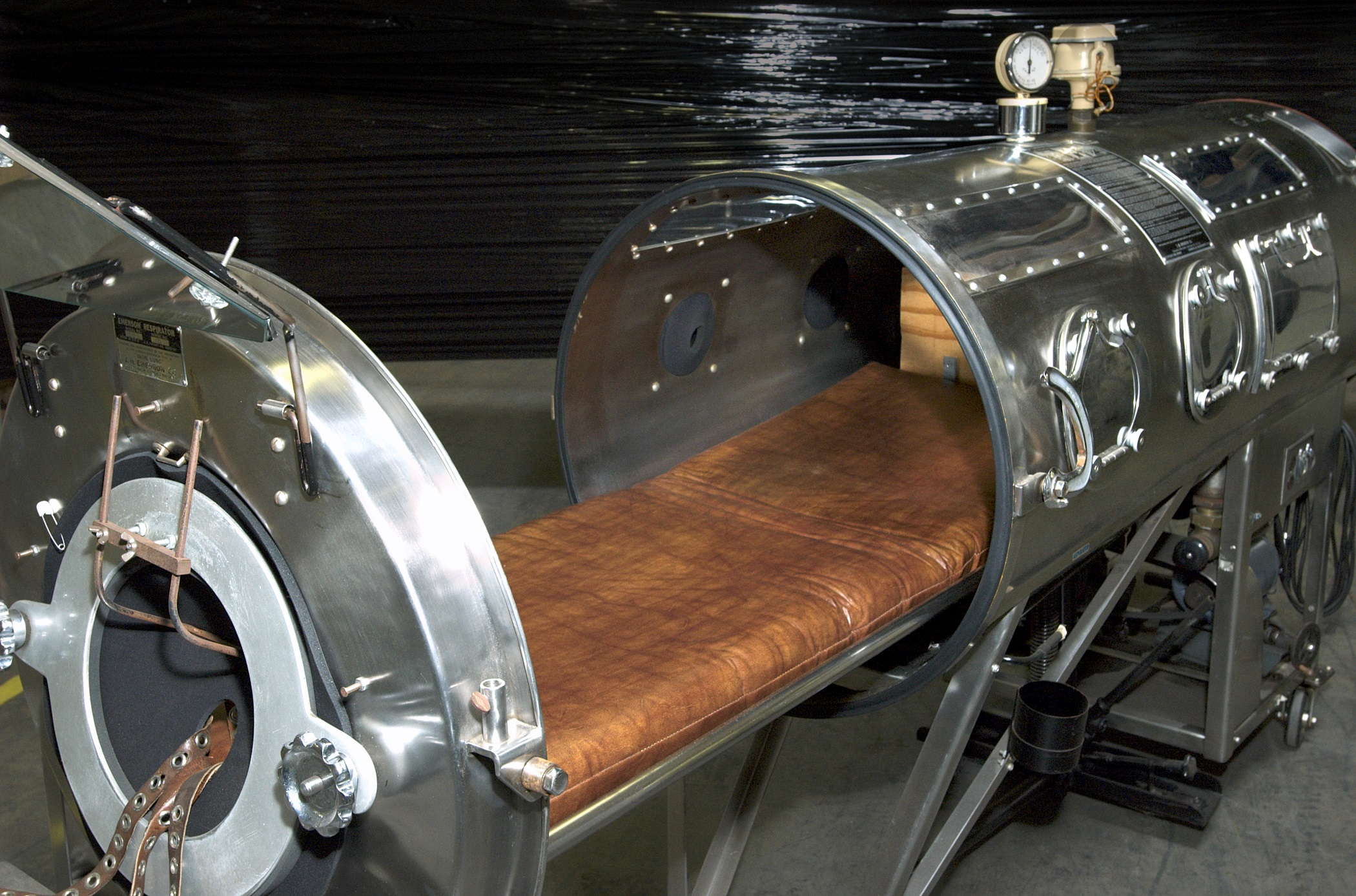
- An Emerson iron lung
- Specialty: Pulmonology
- ICD-9-CM: 93.99
- MeSH: D015919

An iron lung is negative pressure ventilator and mechanical respirator which encloses most of the patient's body. The air pressure inside the enclosed space stimulates breathing. The device is used to assist breathing when muscle control is lost. This treatment was historically helpful for polio and botulism, and for counteracting the effects of barbiturates and tubocurarine. The iron lung has become largely obsolete in modern medicine, replaced by more advanced breathing therapies. Polio eradication in most of the world also reduced the need for the iron lung. In 2020, during the COVID-19 pandemic, interest in these devices was revived as a cheap, readily-producible substitute for positive-pressure ventilators which were in short supply.

The iron lung is a large horizontal cylinder designed to stimulate breathing in patients who have lost control of their respiratory muscles. The patient's head is exposed outside the cylinder, while the body is sealed inside. Air pressure inside the cylinder is cycled to facilitate inhalation and exhalation. Devices like the Drinker, Emerson, and Both respirators are examples of iron lungs, which can be powered manually or mechanically. Smaller versions, like the cuirass ventilator and jacket ventilator, enclose only the patient's torso. Breathing in humans occurs via negative pressure, in which the rib cage expands and the diaphragm contracts, causing air to flow into and out of the lungs.

The concept of external negative pressure ventilation was introduced by John Mayow in 1670. The first widely used device was the iron lung, developed by Philip Drinker and Louis Shaw in 1927, with the first clinical use being in 1928. Initially used to treat coal gas poisoning, the iron lung gained fame for treating respiratory failure caused by polio in the mid-20th century. John Haven Emerson introduced an improved and more affordable version in 1931. The Both respirator, a cheaper and lighter alternative to the Drinker model, was invented in Australia in 1938. British philanthropist William Morris financed the production of the Both–Nuffield respirators, donating them to hospitals throughout Britain and the British Empire. During the polio outbreaks of the 1940s and 1950s, iron lungs filled hospital wards, assisting patients with paralyzed diaphragms in their recovery.

Polio vaccination programs and the development of modern ventilators have nearly eradicated the use of iron lungs in the developed world. Positive pressure ventilation systems, which blow air into the patient's lungs via intubation, have become more common than negative pressure systems like iron lungs. However, negative pressure ventilation is more similar to normal physiological breathing and may be preferable in rare conditions such as central hypoventilation syndrome. As of 2026, after the death of Martha Lillard, there are no US patients using an iron lung. In response to the COVID-19 pandemic and the shortage of modern ventilators, some enterprises developed prototypes of new, easily producible versions of the iron lung.

== Design and function ==
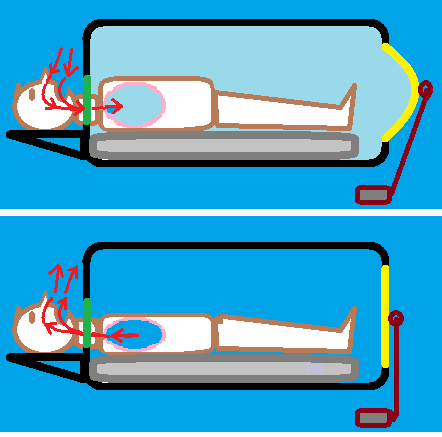
An iron lung cylinder (black) showing the patient’s head exposed through a sealed opening. The diaphragm (yellow) mechanically extends and retracts, varying the air pressure in the cylinder, causing the patient’s chest to expand (inhaling, top) and contract (exhaling, bottom).

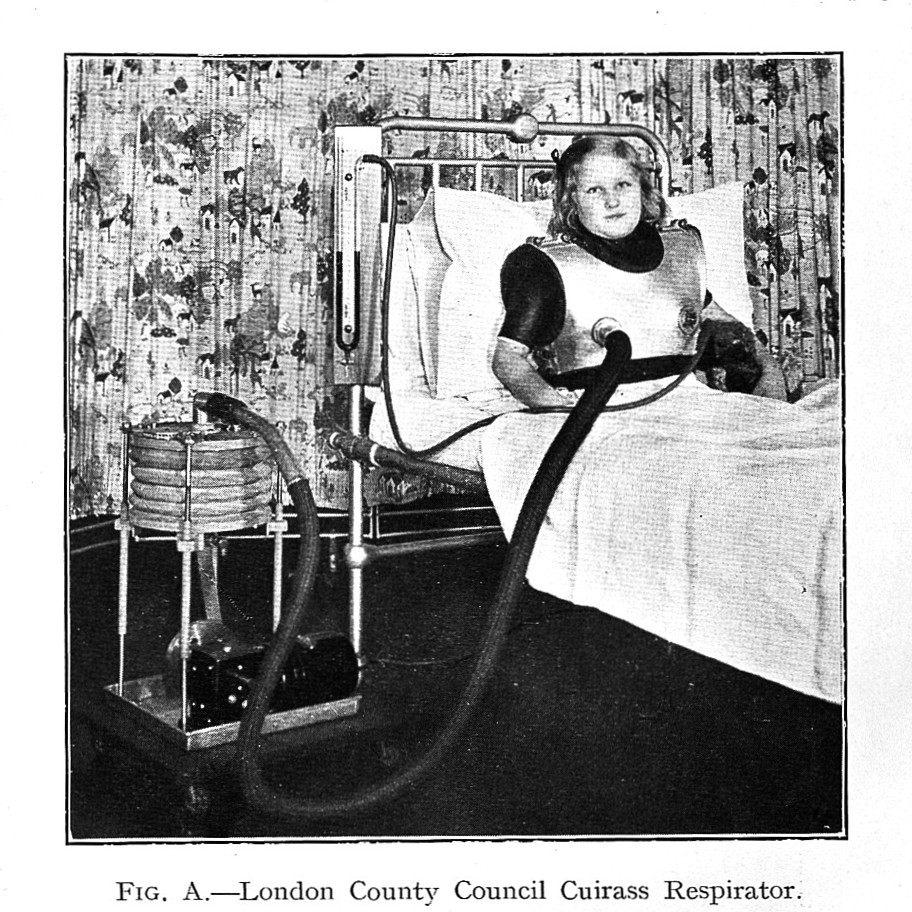
A patient wearing a cuirass respirator

1939 Dutch newsreel on the function of the iron lung

The iron lung is typically a large horizontal cylinder in which a person is laid, with their head protruding from a hole in the end of the cylinder, so that their full head (down to their voice box) is outside the cylinder, exposed to ambient air, and the rest of their body sealed inside the cylinder, where air pressure is continuously cycled up and down to stimulate breathing.

To cause the patient to inhale, air is pumped out of the cylinder, causing a slight vacuum, which causes the patient's chest and abdomen to expand (drawing air from outside the cylinder, through the patient's exposed nose or mouth, into their lungs). Then, for the patient to exhale, the air inside the cylinder is compressed slightly (or allowed to equalize to ambient room pressure), causing the patient's chest and abdomen to partially collapse, forcing air out of the lungs as the patient exhales the breath through their exposed mouth and nose, outside the cylinder.

Examples of the device include the Drinker respirator, the Emerson respirator, and the Both respirator. Iron lungs can be either manually or mechanically powered, but are normally powered by an electric motor linked to a flexible pumping diaphragm (commonly opposite the end of the cylinder from the patient's head). Larger "room-sized" iron lungs were also developed, allowing for simultaneous ventilation of several patients (each with their heads protruding from sealed openings in the outer wall), with sufficient space inside for a nurse or a respiratory therapist to be inside the sealed room, attending the patients.

Smaller, single-patient versions of the iron lung include the so-called cuirass ventilator (named for the cuirass, a torso-covering body armor). The cuirass ventilator encloses only the patient's torso, or chest and abdomen, but otherwise operates essentially the same as the original, full-sized iron lung. A lightweight variation on the cuirass ventilator is the jacket ventilator or poncho or raincoat ventilator, which uses a flexible, impermeable material (such as plastic or rubber) stretched over a metal or plastic frame over the patient's torso.

== Method and use ==
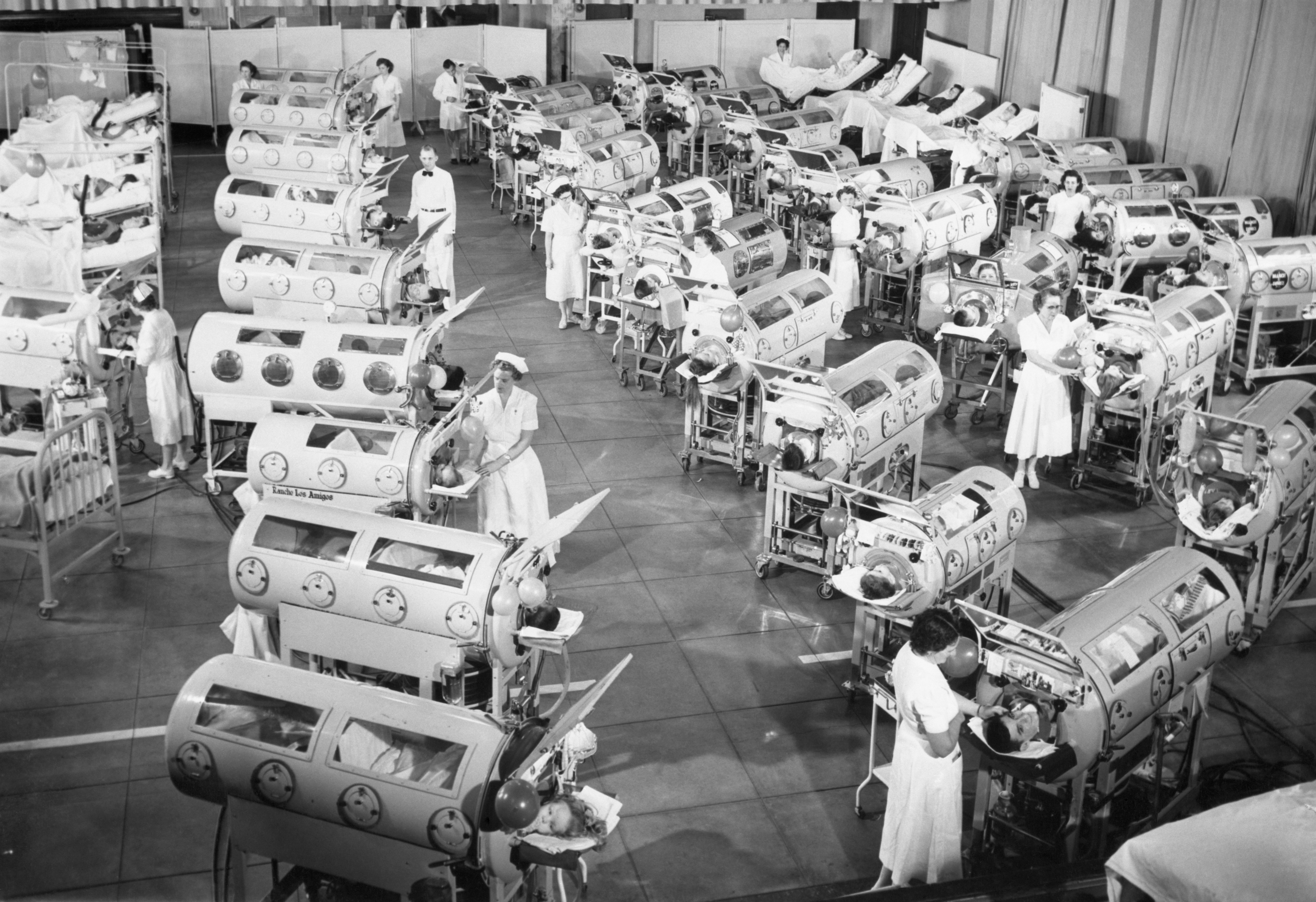
An iron lung ward, as mocked-up for a film, circa 1953

Humans, like most mammals, breathe by negative pressure breathing: the rib cage expands and the diaphragm contracts, expanding the chest cavity. This causes the pressure in the chest cavity to decrease, and the lungs expand to fill the space. This, in turn, causes the pressure of the air inside the lungs to decrease (it becomes negative relative to the atmosphere), and air flows into the lungs from the atmosphere: inhalation. When the diaphragm relaxes, the reverse happens and the person exhales. If a person loses part or all of the ability to control the muscles involved, breathing becomes difficult or impossible.

== Invention and early use ==
=== Initial development ===
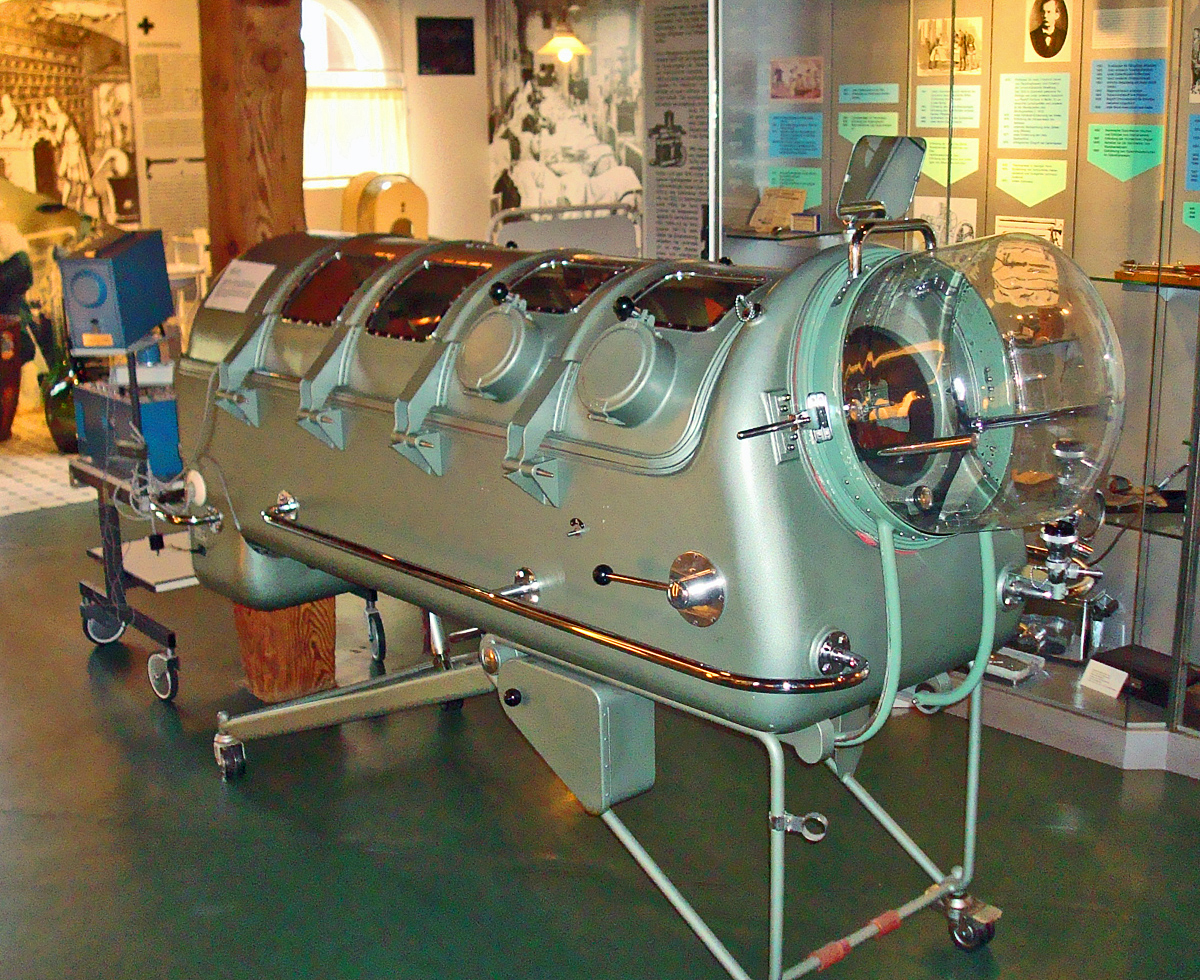
An iron lung from the 1950s in the Gütersloh Town Museum. In Germany, fewer than a dozen of these breathing machines are available to the public.

In 1670, English scientist John Mayow came up with the idea of external negative pressure ventilation. Mayow built a model consisting of bellows and a bladder to pull in and expel air. The first negative pressure ventilator was described by British physician John Dalziel in 1832. Successful use of similar devices was described a few years later. Early prototypes included a hand-operated bellows-driven "Spirophore" designed by Dr Woillez of Paris (1876), and an airtight wooden box designed specifically for the treatment of polio by Dr Stueart of South Africa (1918). Stueart's box was sealed at the waist and shoulders with clay and powered by motor-driven bellows.

=== Drinker and Shaw tank ===
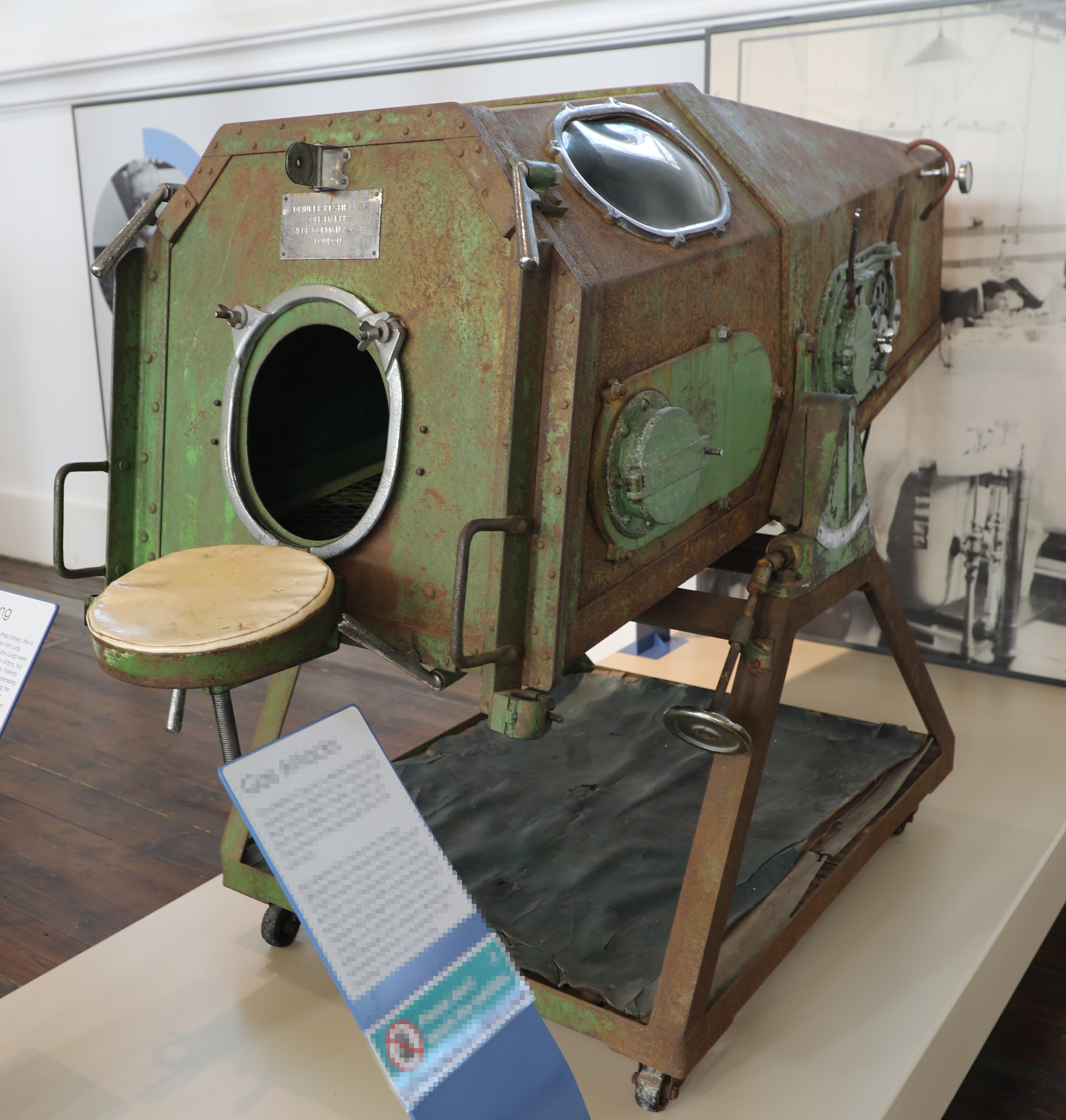
A Drinker iron lung displayed at the chapel of Netley Hospital, 2018

The first of these devices to be widely used however was developed in 1928 by Phillip Drinker and Louis Shaw of the United States. The iron lung, often referred to in the early days as the "Drinker respirator", was invented by Philip Drinker (1894–1972) and Louis Agassiz Shaw Jr., professors of industrial hygiene at the Harvard School of Public Health. The machine was powered by an electric motor with air pumps from two vacuum cleaners. The air pumps changed the pressure inside a rectangular, airtight metal box, pulling air in and out of the lungs. The first clinical use of the Drinker respirator on a human was on October 12, 1928, at the Boston Children's Hospital in the US. The subject was an eight-year-old girl who was nearly dead as a result of respiratory failure due to polio. Her dramatic recovery within less than a minute of being placed in the chamber helped popularize the new device.

==== Variations ====
Boston manufacturer Warren E. Collins began production of the iron lung that year. Although it was initially developed for the treatment of victims of coal gas poisoning, it was most famously used in the mid-20th century for the treatment of respiratory failure caused by polio.

Danish physiologist August Krogh, upon returning to Copenhagen in 1931 from a visit to New York where he saw the Drinker machine in use, constructed the first Danish respirator designed for clinical purposes. Krogh's device differed from Drinker's in that its motor was powered by water from the city pipelines. Krogh also made an infant respirator version.

In 1931, John Haven Emerson (1906–1997) introduced an improved and less expensive iron lung. The Emerson iron lung had a bed that could slide in and out of the cylinder as needed, and the tank had portal windows which allowed attendants to reach in and adjust limbs, sheets, or hot packs. Drinker and Harvard University sued Emerson, claiming he had infringed on patent rights. Emerson defended himself by making the case that such lifesaving devices should be freely available to all. Emerson also demonstrated that every aspect of Drinker's patents had been published or used by others at earlier times. Since an invention must be novel to be patentable, prior publication/use of the invention meant it was not novel and therefore unpatentable. Emerson won the case, and Drinker's patents were declared invalid.

The United Kingdom's first iron lung was designed in 1934 by Robert Henderson, an Aberdeen doctor. Henderson had seen a demonstration of the Drinker respirator in the early 1930s and built a device of his own upon his return to Scotland. Four weeks after its construction, the Henderson respirator was used to save the life of a 10-year-old boy from New Deer, Aberdeenshire who had poliomyelitis. Despite this success, Henderson was reprimanded for secretly using hospital facilities to build the machine.

=== Both respirator ===
The Both respirator, a negative-pressure ventilator, was invented in 1937 when Australia's epidemic of poliomyelitis created an immediate need for more ventilating machines to compensate for respiratory paralysis. Although the Drinker model was effective and saved lives, its widespread use was hindered because the machines were very large, heavy (about 750 lbs or 340 kg), bulky, and expensive. An adult machine cost about $2,000 in the US in 1930 (equivalent to $39,000 in 2025), and about £1,500 sterling in Europe in the mid-1950s (equivalent to $34,000 in 2025). The cost of one delivered to Melbourne in 1936 was AU£2,000 (equivalent to $216,000 in 2022). Consequently, there were few of the Drinker devices in Australia and Europe.

The South Australia Health Department asked Adelaide brothers Edward and Don Both to create an inexpensive "iron lung". Biomedical engineer Edward Both designed and developed a cabinet respirator made of plywood that worked similarly to the Drinker device, with the addition of a bi-valved design which allowed temporary access to the patient's body. Far cheaper to make (only £100) than the Drinker machine, the Both Respirator also weighed less and could be constructed and transported more quickly. Such was the demand for the machines that they were often used by patients within an hour of production.

Visiting London in 1938 during another polio epidemic, Both produced additional respirators there, which attracted the attention of William Morris (Lord Nuffield), a British motor manufacturer and philanthropist. Nuffield, intrigued by the design, financed the production of approximately 1700 machines at his car factory in Cowley and donated them to hospitals throughout all parts of Britain and the British Empire. Soon, the Both–Nuffield respirators were able to be produced by the thousand at about one-thirteenth the cost of the American design. By the early 1950s, there were over 700 Both-Nuffield iron lungs in the United Kingdom, but only 50 Drinker devices.

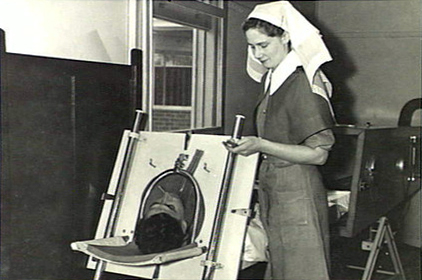
A Both cabinet respirator being used to treat a patient at the 110th Australian Military Hospital in 1943

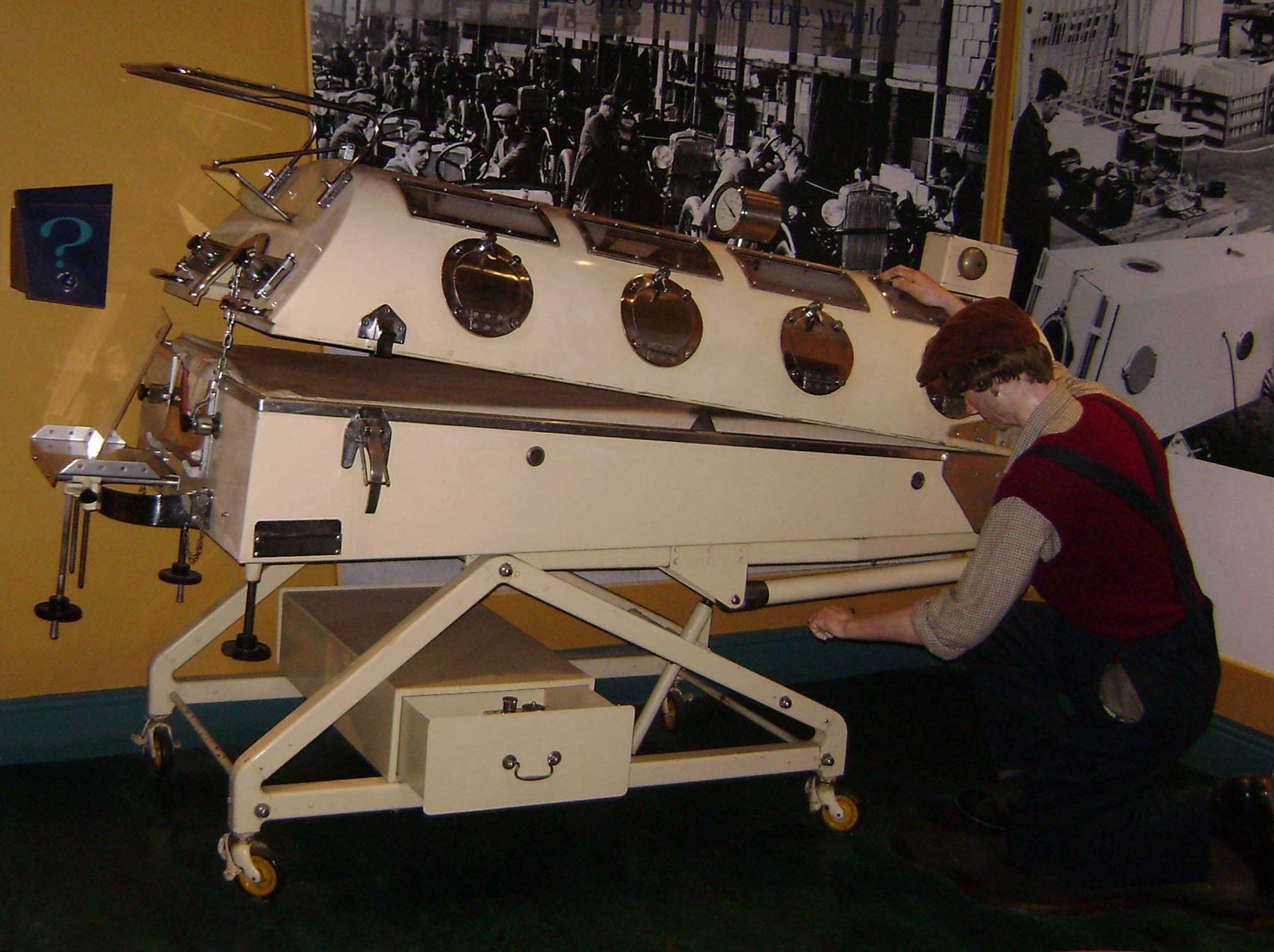
Both–Nuffield iron lung display at the Thackray Museum of Medicine, Leeds. Pictures show assembly at the Morris motor works.

=== Polio epidemic ===
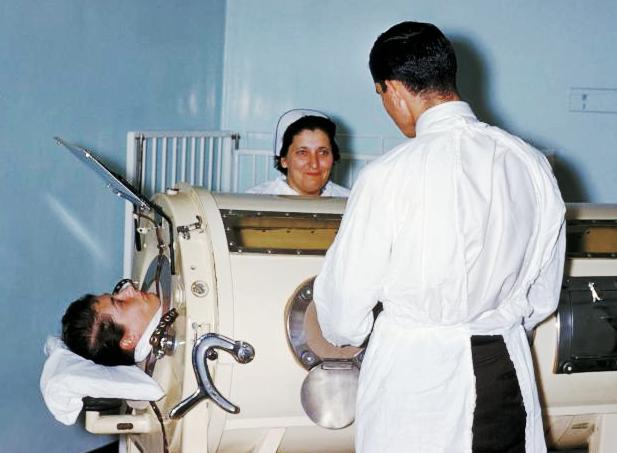
Staff in a Rhode Island hospital examine a patient in an iron lung tank respirator during a polio epidemic in 1960.

Rows of iron lungs filled hospital wards at the height of the polio outbreaks of the 1940s and 1950s, helping children and some adults with bulbar polio and bulbospinal polio. A polio patient with a paralyzed diaphragm would typically spend two weeks inside an iron lung while recovering.

=== Outcomes ===
Patients treated in iron lungs for polio experienced varying outcomes depending on the severity of their condition and the duration of their treatment: Most patients needed the iron lung for only a few weeks or months. However, a minority with permanently paralyzed chest muscles faced a lifetime of confinement in the iron lung. Learning to breathe again outside the iron lung was often a difficult and frightening process for patients. Most gradually built up strength in their chest muscles through therapy, allowing them to spend increasing amounts of time outside the device. Some patients were able to recover fully and end the treatment. In severe cases, fatal complications set in, especially aspiration pneumonia and central respiratory center involvement. In the late 20th century, vaccination programs have virtually eradicated new cases of poliomyelitis in the developed world. Because of this, the development of modern ventilators, and widespread use of tracheal intubation and tracheotomy, the iron lung has mostly disappeared from modern medicine. In 1959, 1,200 people were using tank respirators in the United States, but by 2004 that number had decreased to just 39. By 2014, only 10 people were left with an iron lung.

== Modern development and usage ==
=== Replacement ===
Positive pressure ventilation systems are now more common than negative pressure systems. Positive pressure ventilators work by blowing air into the patient's lungs via intubation through the airway; they were used for the first time in Blegdams Hospital, Copenhagen, Denmark, during a polio outbreak in 1952. It proved a success and by 1953 it had superseded the iron lung throughout Europe.

The positive pressure ventilator has the advantage that the patient's airways can be cleared, and the patient can be in a semi-seated position in the acute phase of polio. The fatality rate when using iron lungs on respiratory paralysis patients could be as high as 80% to 90%; most patients either drowned in their own saliva, as their swallowing muscles had been paralyzed, or suffered organ shutdown due to acidosis from accumulated carbon dioxide in the bloodstream due to clogged airways. By using positive-pressure ventilators instead of iron lungs, the Copenhagen hospital team was able to decrease the fatality rate eventually down to 11%. The first patient treated this way was a 12-year-old girl named Vivi Ebert, who had bulbar polio.

The iron lung now has a marginal place in modern respiratory therapy. Most patients with paralysis of the breathing muscles use modern mechanical ventilators that push air into the airway with positive pressure. These are generally efficacious and have the advantage of not restricting patients' movements or caregivers' ability to examine the patients as significantly as an iron lung does.

=== Continued use ===
Despite the advantages of positive ventilation systems, negative-pressure ventilation is a truer approximation of normal physiological breathing and results in a more normal distribution of air in the lungs. It may also be preferable in certain rare conditions, such as central hypoventilation syndrome, in which failure of the medullary respiratory centers at the base of the brain results in patients having no autonomic control of breathing. At least one reported polio patient, Dianne Odell, had a spinal deformity that caused the use of mechanical ventilators to be contraindicated.

Joan Headley of Post-Polio Health International said that as of May 28, 2008, about 30 patients in the US were still using an iron lung. It was estimated that 19 patients were living at home in Houston.

Martha Mason of Lattimore, North Carolina, died on May 4, 2009, after spending 61 of her 72 years in an iron lung. On October 30 of the same year, June Middleton of Melbourne, Australia, who had been entered in the Guinness Book of Records as the person who spent the longest time in an iron lung, died aged 83, having spent more than 60 years in her iron lung.

In 2013, Post-Polio Health International estimated that six to eight US patients were still using an iron lung. By 2017, this number declined to three. To help keeping the machines running, some figures in the makerspace community including Naomi Wu studied the possibility of 3D printing spare parts such as gaskets.

In 2021, the National Public Radio programs Radio Diaries and All Things Considered reported on Martha Lillard, one of the last remaining Americans depending on the daily use of an iron lung, which she had been using since 1953. In her interview, she reported that she was having problems obtaining replacement parts to keep her machine working properly.

On March 11, 2024, Paul Alexander of Dallas, Texas, United States, died at the age of 78. He had been confined to an iron lung for 72 years from the age of six. Alexander was recognized by the Guinness Book of Records as the "longest iron lung patient" before his death. More than two years later, Martha Lillard, the last US polio patient still using an iron lung died on June 26, 2026 at the age of 78.

=== COVID-19 pandemic ===
In early 2020, reacting to the COVID-19 pandemic, to address the urgent global shortage of modern ventilators (needed for patients with advanced, severe COVID-19), some enterprises developed prototypes of new, readily-producible versions of the iron lung. These developments included:

- A compact, torso-sized "exovent" developed by a team in the United Kingdom, which included the University of Warwick, the Royal National Throat Nose and Ear Hospital, the Marshall Aerospace and Defence Group, and the Imperial College Healthcare NHS Trust, along with teams of medical clinicians, academics, manufacturers, engineers and citizen scientists
- A full-size iron lung developed in the United States by a team led by Hess Services, Inc., of Hays, Kansas
