= Robert Henderson (physician, born 1902) =

Scottish physician (1902–1999)

Robert Henderson CBE, MD, DPH (7 April 1902 – 26 December 1999) was a Scottish physician who developed the first iron lung in Britain. He is also known for his romantic relationship with the former and first female Prime Minister, Margaret Thatcher.

== Education and career ==
Robert Henderson was born in Clatt, Aberdeenshire. During the First World War, he spent time as an apprentice at a garage as a motor mechanic. One of his teachers at the Gordon Schools suggested he should pursue a medical career, and he received special tuition to enter medical school.

He graduated in 1929 from the University of Aberdeen and began his career as a resident doctor at City Hospital.

After moving to London in 1935, he worked to upgrade hospitals to be used for the war. He was stationed at Tindal House, Aylesbury, now Stoke Mandeville Hospital. He later moved to Dartford, Kent, where he worked as the medical superintendent at Southern Hospital.

In 1947, he was made CBE for his contributions to medicine. He married Josie Beeney in 1960 and had three stepchildren.

== Iron lung contributions ==
After a trip to the United States, where he witnessed a Drinker respirator being used, he became interested in intensive care and brought back materials to Scotland.

Working evenings and weekends, with the help of Aberdeen City Hospital's engineers, he put together the first British iron lung, known as the Henderson respirator. A month after the iron lung's construction, it was used to treat the ten-year-old Charles Forbes, suffering from poliomyelitis. It was the first case of polio in the UK to be treated this way. Henderson attended Forbes' funeral when he died in the 1950s.

He was disciplined for building the machine using hospital facilities, meaning that his draft paper was never submitted for publication. The Scottish Medical Journal later corrected this in 1997, leaving 63 years between draft and publication.

== Relationship with Margaret Thatcher ==
Whilst working as the medical superintendent of the Southern Hospital in Dartford, Robert Henderson met the then Margaret Roberts at a railway station. At the time, Margaret Roberts was going on occasional dates with Denis Thatcher, but continued to date both men. Her letters suggest that she was more serious about Robert.

She wrote many letters to her sister Muriel about him in which she stated “I think we are both getting very fond of one another – in fact more than that. I hope so.”

The couple had a 23-year age gap. When Roberts was asked if she would marry Henderson, she stated, “I wouldn't disagree with that, but he was so much older.”
