= RAF Gütersloh =

Former Royal Air Force station in North Rhine-Westphalia, Germany

RAF Gütersloh
- Gütersloh, North Rhine-Westphalia in Germany
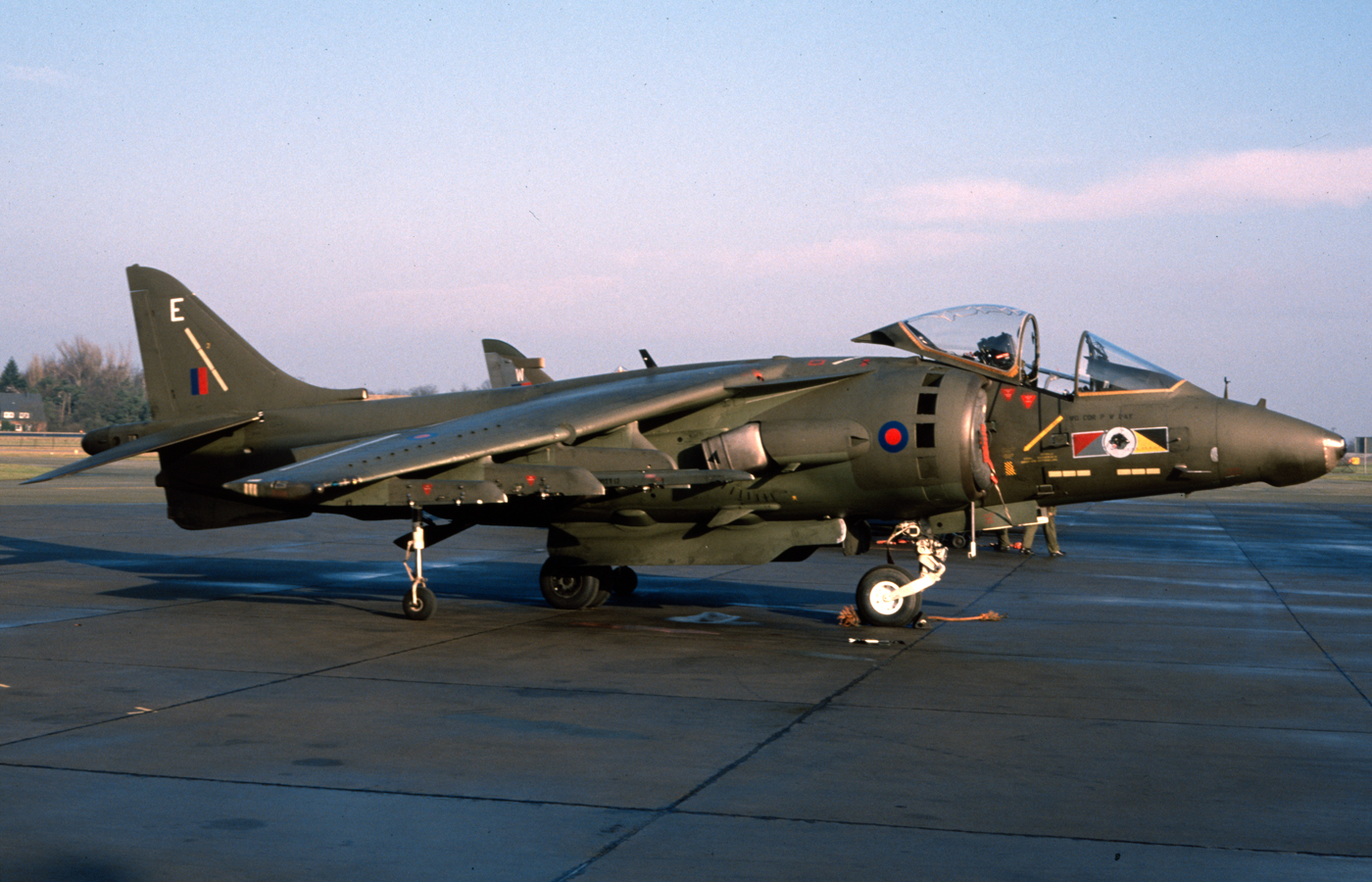
- A 233 Operational Conversion Unit BAe Harrier at RAF Gütersloh during 1987.

Site information
- Type: Royal Air Force station
- Owner: Ministry of Defence (UK)
- Operator: Royal Air Force
- Controlled by: British Forces Germany
- Condition: Closed

Location
- Shown within North Rhine-Westphalia RAF Gütersloh (Germany)
- Coordinates: 51°55′31.4″N 8°18′23.3″E

Site history
- Built: 1935
- In use: 27 June 1945 – 30 June 1993
- Fate: Transferred to British Army to become Princess Royal Barracks.

Airfield information
- Identifiers: IATA: GUT, ICAO: ETUO, WMO: 10320
- Elevation: 72 metres (236 ft) AMSL
Runways
Direction	Length and surface
09/27	2,252 metres (7,388 ft) Asphalt

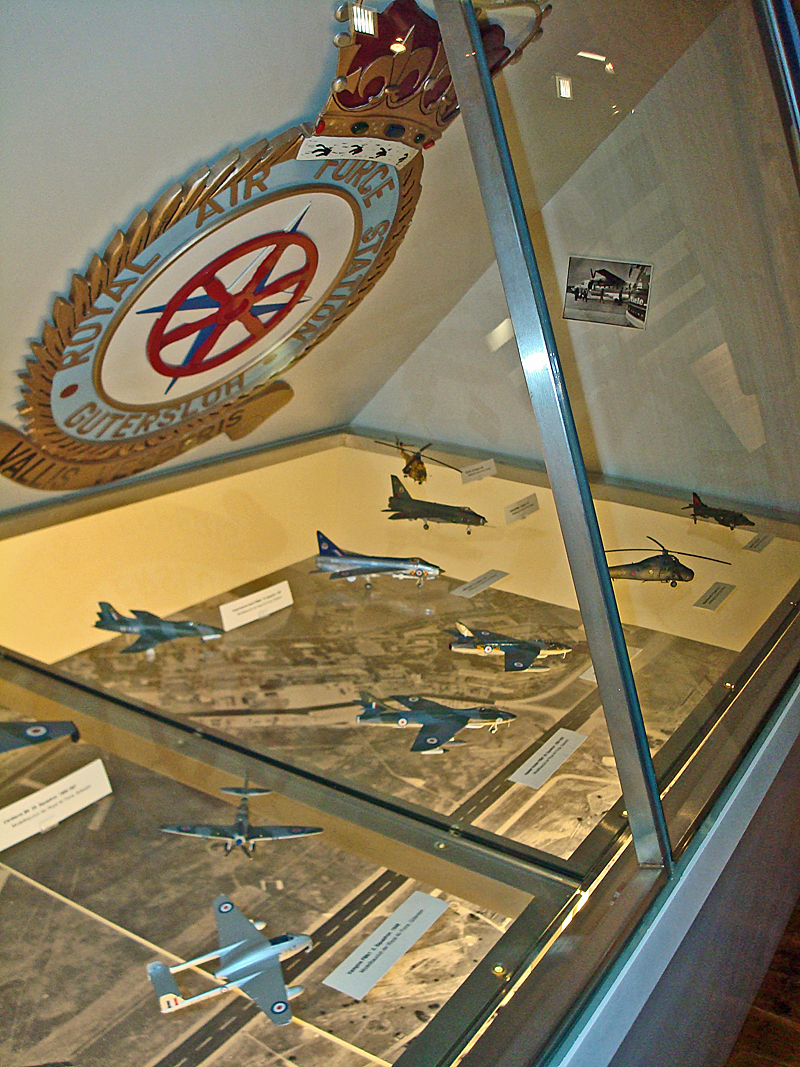
Stadtmuseum Gütersloh

Royal Air Force Gütersloh, more commonly known as RAF Gütersloh, was a Royal Air Force Germany military airfield, the nearest Royal Air Force airfield to the East/West German border, in the vicinity of the town of Gütersloh. It was constructed by the German government prior to the Second World War. The station was captured by the American forces in April 1945 and was handed over to the RAF in June 1945 as Headquarters No. 2 Group RAF.

== History ==
The early history of the airfield is largely undetermined. It is known that construction began in 1935 for a paratroop unit using Junkers Ju 52s then as a radar school, and the station was active in 1944–1945 with Junkers Ju 88 Nightfighters of 5./NJG 2 (Nachtjagdgeschwader 2) as part of the Defense of the Reich defensive aerial campaign fought by the Luftwaffe.

The tower of the Officers' Mess contains a room known as Göring's Room. Legend has it Hermann Göring used this room to relive his wartime exploits with the new generation of flyers. Reportedly a favourite expression of his was "If I should lie, may the beam above my head crack". In response to this a junior officer arranged that the beam be sawn through and, by a system of pulleys, that the beam should appear to crack in response to the Reichmarschall's challenge. An article appearing in Flight magazine in 1946 has the same story with "an elderly station commander" featuring in the Göring role. From interviews with Luftwaffe personnel of the period, it appears that Göring visited the station before and during the war. A photograph of the Reichmarschall supposedly at Gütersloh is displayed in the Officers' Mess.

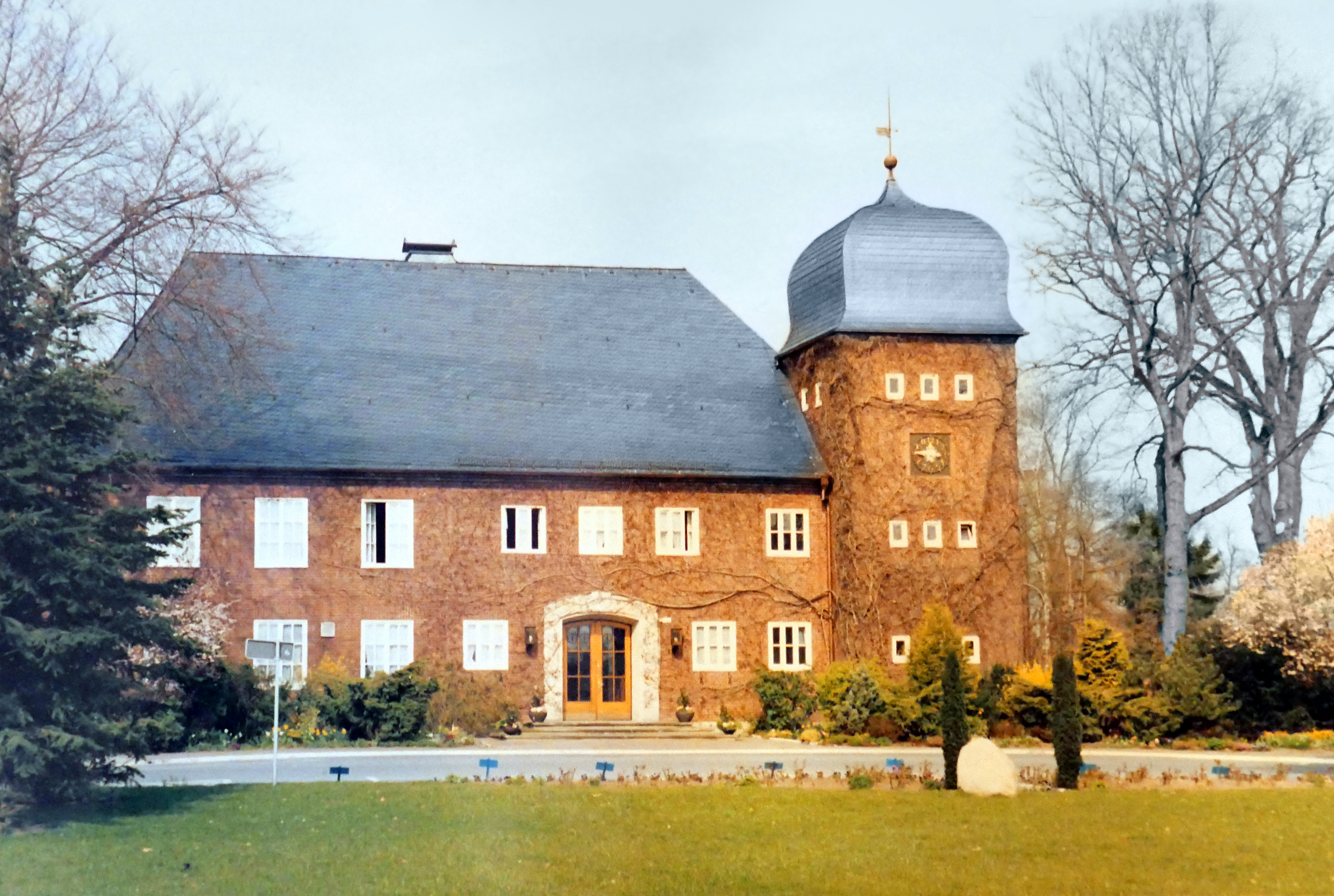
RAF Gütersloh Officers' Mess 1991

The station was captured by the Americans in April 1945 and designated as "Advanced Landing Ground Y-99". The Americans laid down a 4,000-foot SMT hardened runway and the Ninth Air Force operated Lockheed P-38 Lightning and North American P-51 Mustang reconnaissance aircraft of the 363d Tactical Reconnaissance Group in late April. The P-38 Lightning-equipped 370th Fighter Group also operated from Gütersloh until the German capitulation on 8 May 1945. The 370th remained until the airfield was turned over to the RAF as part of the formation of the British occupation zone in Germany on 27 June 1945.

=== RAF control ===
The RAF established Headquarters No. 2 Group RAF after the Americans moved south. From 1958 RAF Gütersloh fell under the operational command of 2 ATAF, like all other RAFG stations. The RAF initially built a 1,830 metre-long runway in 1946, which was later lengthened to 2,252 metres.

During its history as an RAF station, the base was home to two squadrons of the English Electric Lightning F2/F2A – No. 92 Squadron RAF and No. 19 Squadron RAF from 1968 to 1976. These provided two aircraft for the Quick Response Alert, able to scramble within minutes. It then became home to No. 3 Squadron RAF and No. 4 Squadron RAF which flew successive variants of the British Aerospace Harrier II. After the Harriers departed, the RAF continued to operate helicopters, No. 18 Squadron RAF with the Boeing Chinook and No. 230 Squadron RAF with the Westland Puma HC1. The base was also used by No. 63 Squadron RAF Regiment with Rapier and HQ No. 33 Wing RAF Regiment.

RAF Gütersloh closed and was transferred to the British Army on 30 June 1993.

=== RAF units and aircraft ===
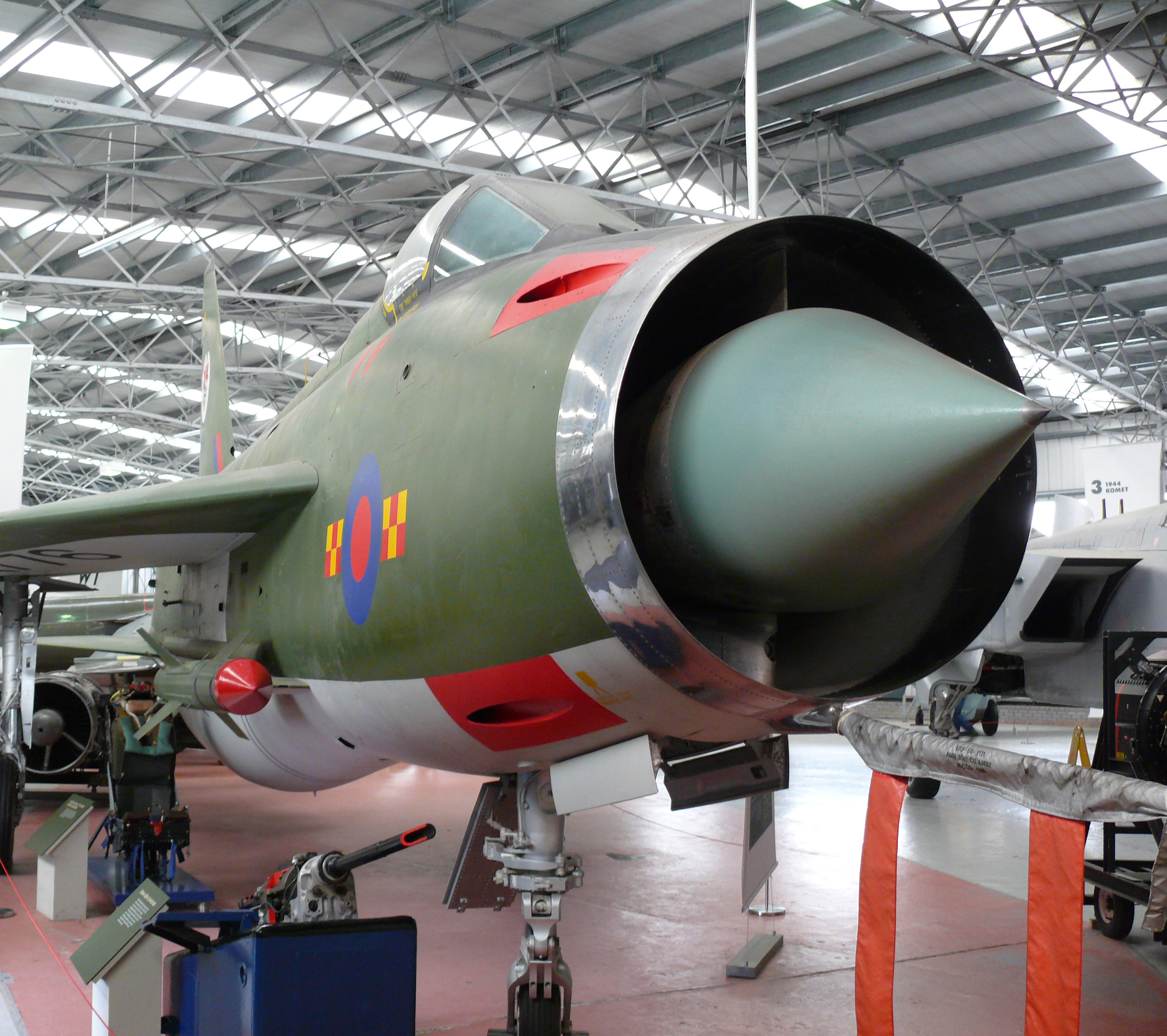
English Electric Lightning in the National Museum of Flight in East Fortune, Scotland. It is displayed in the colours of No 92 Squadron, located at RAF Gütersloh with whom it served until 1977.

Unit	Dates	Aircraft	Variant	Notes
No. 2 Squadron RAF	1952–1953 1961–1970	Gloster Meteor Hawker Hunter	PR.10 FR.10	
No. 3 Squadron RAF	1948–1952 1977–1992	de Havilland Vampire Hawker Siddeley Harrier	FB.1, FB.4 GR.3, GR.5, GR.7	
No. 4 Squadron RAF	1961–1970 1977–1992	Hawker Hunter Hawker Siddeley Harrier	FR10 GR.3, GR.5, GR.7	
No. 14 Squadron RAF	1958–1962	Hawker Hunter	F.4	
No. 16 Squadron RAF	1947 1948 1948	Hawker Tempest	F.2	
No. 18 Squadron RAF	1965–1968 1970–1980 1983–1993	Westland Wessex Westland Wessex Boeing Chinook	HC.2 HC.2 HC.1	1992/1993 also with Puma HC.1
No. 19 Squadron RAF	1965–1976	English Electric Lightning	F.2, F.2A	
No. 20 Squadron RAF	1958–1960	Hawker Hunter	F.6	
No. 21 Squadron RAF	1945 1946	de Havilland Mosquito	VI	Based three times in 1946
No. 26 Squadron RAF	1947 1948 1958–1960	Hawker Tempest Hawker Tempest Hawker Hunter	F.2 F.2 F.6	Based three times in 1948
No. 33 Squadron RAF	1947 1948 1948	Hawker Tempest	F2	
No. 59 Squadron RAF	1956–1957	English Electric Canberra	B.2, B(I).8	
No. 67 Squadron RAF	1950–1952	de Havilland Vampire	FB.5	
No. 69 Squadron RAF	1954	English Electric Canberra	PR.3	
No. 71 Squadron RAF	1950–1952	de Havilland Vampire	FB.5	
No. 79 Squadron RAF	1951–1954 1956–1960	Gloster Meteor Supermarine Swift	FR.9 FR.5	
No. 80 Squadron RAF	1948	Supermarine Spitfire	F.24	Based twice
No. 92 Squadron RAF	1968–1977	English Electric Lightning	F.2, F.2A	
No. 102 Squadron RAF	1954–1956	English Electric Canberra	B.2	
No. 103 Squadron RAF	1954–1956	English Electric Canberra	B.2	
No. 104 Squadron RAF	1955–1956	English Electric Canberra	B.2	
No. 107 Squadron RAF	1945 1946 1946 1947	de Havilland Mosquito	VI	Based three times in 1947
No. 149 Squadron RAF	1954–1956	English Electric Canberra	B.2	
No. 230 Squadron RAF	1963–1964 1980–1992	Westland Whirlwind Westland Puma	HC.10 HC.1	
No. 541 Squadron RAF	1952 1954	Gloster Meteor Gloster Meteor	PR.10 PR.10	

== Gütersloh under the British Army ==
Following the withdrawal by the Royal Air Force in 1993, the base became a British Army Garrison, called the Princess Royal Barracks, Gütersloh, a base for British Army helicopters and Royal Logistic Corps Regiments.

- HQ Gütersloh Garrison
- HQ 102 Logistic Brigade
- 1 Regiment Army Air Corps
  - No. 652 Squadron AAC
  - No. 661 Squadron AAC
- 1 Logistic Support Regiment, Royal Logistic Corps
  - 74 HQ Squadron
  - 2 Close Support Squadron
  - 12 Close Support Squadron
  - 23 General Support Squadron,
- 2 Logistic Support Regiment, Royal Logistic Corps
  - 27 HQ Squadron
  - 22 Close Support Squadron
  - 45 Close Support Squadron
  - 76 General Support Squadron
- 6 Regiment, Royal Logistic Corps
  - 600 HQ Squadron
  - 62 Material Squadron
  - 61 Ammo Squadron
  - LAD REME
- 8 Regiment, Royal Logistic Corps
  - 64 Fuel Squadron
- 30 Squadron (part of 24 Regiment, Royal Logistic Corps)
- 5 Regiment, Royal Military Police
  - 114 Provost Company (now a Det. of 110 Provost Company, 1 RMP)
- 262 Brigade Signal and HQ Squadron, Royal Signals

In September 2016 the final Soldiers left Princess Royal Barracks for the last time.

== See also ==
- Advanced Landing Ground
- List of aircraft of the Royal Air Force
- List of former Royal Air Force stations
- List of Royal Air Force aircraft squadrons
