= Martha Mason =

American writer (1937–2009)

- Born: May 31, 1937; Lattimore, North Carolina
- Died: May 4, 2009 (aged 71); Lattimore, North Carolina

Martha Mason (May 31, 1937 – May 4, 2009) was a writer born and based in Lattimore, North Carolina who spent 61 years in an iron lung.

== Early life ==
On the 13th of September, during the 1948 epidemic Mason was stricken by polio. A year later, Mason was sent home from the hospital in an iron lung with help from the March of Dimes foundation, which she remained for the rest of her life. She preferred the iron lung to newer ventilators as it did not require intubation, surgery, or hospitalization. Her older brother, Gaston Mason, died of polio three days before her own polio symptoms began.

She completed high school with daily visits from her teachers, and graduated first in her class with highest honors.

Mason moved to Boiling Springs with her parents to enroll in Gardner-Webb College (now University), earning an associate degree at age 21. She then attended (again with her parents' accompaniment) Wake Forest College (also now University), earning a bachelor's degree in English in 1960. She was first in her classes at both colleges. She received an honorary doctorate from Gardner-Webb University in May 2004.

After her education, Mason returned to Lattimore and started work at a local newspaper; she dictated her work to her mother. Shortly after, a heart attack incapacitated her father and her mother was unable to assist her in her work.

== Later life ==
Mason returned to writing in the mid 1990s when advancements in speech recognition technology enabled her to operate a computer on her own, giving her the ability to dictate and edit, as well as to browse the Internet.

This latter factor was particularly significant for Mason. While her highly social and independent lifestyle (she hosted dinner parties and managed her own household, for example) would probably have only been possible in a tight-knit community (Lattimore's current population is approximately 400), her broad interests were not in tune with small-town perspectives.

She wrote a memoir, Breath: Life in the Rhythm of an Iron Lung, which was published in 2003. She was also the subject of Martha in Lattimore (2005), a documentary film by Mary Dalton. Mason also appeared in the Oscar-nominated documentary about polio The Final Inch (2009).

== Death ==
She died in Lattimore shortly after dawn on Monday, May 4, 2009, one month shy of her 72nd birthday. She had lived 61 years in an iron lung before her death, at the time longer than any other polio survivor in the world.
