= Stadtmuseum Gütersloh =

Museum in Gütersloh, Germany

Gütersloh Town Museum
- Stadtmuseum Gütersloh
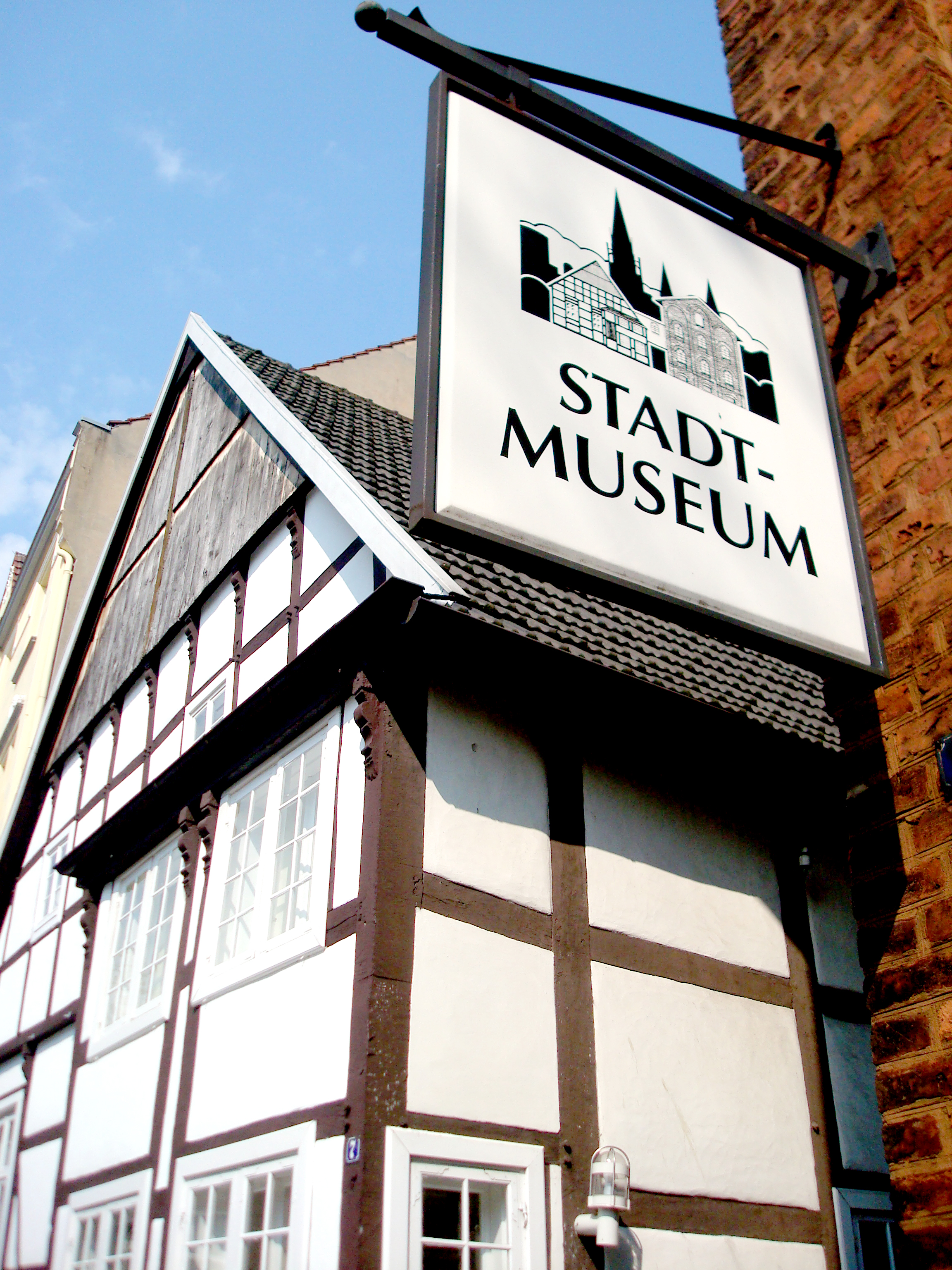
- At the entrance of the Stadtmuseum

- Germany
- Established: 1988
- Location: Kökerstr. 7-11a, Gütersloh
- Coordinates: 51.9064°N 8.3802°E
- Type: Local museum, medical museum, industrial Museum
- Visitors: 9,000
- Director: Norbert Ellermann (acting director)
- Public transit access: Gütersloh Central Station
- Website: www.stadtmuseum-guetersloh.de

The Stadtmuseum Gütersloh (Gütersloh Town Museum) is a museum in Gütersloh, Germany, dealing with the city's history. Under the auspices of Gütersloh's association for local history it accommodates – beside exhibits to Gütersloh's local history – two exhibitions referring to the history of medicine and the industrial history. Every year about five to seven special exhibitions about local topics respectively travelling exhibitions take place in addition to these three permanent exhibitions. The medical-historic collection – the flagship of the museum – was granted a special prize of the European Museum of the Year Award in 1990. A desk of the Nobel Prize winner Robert Koch and an iron lung are some of the most important exhibits.

== Museum’s History ==
On 24 June 1982 Dr. Wilhelm Angenete (1890-1984) – a family doctor in Gütersloh – and his sister Else donated two real estates with buildings in the city of Gütersloh to the association for local history on condition of establishing a museum there. In 1988 the town museum Gütersloh was opened in a brick building under the responsibility of Gütersloh's association for local history. Till today the town Gütersloh participates in the cost sharing. In 1997 a neighbouring half-timbered house could be renovated in a second construction phase. In the year 2000 the museum's café was opened.

== Buildings ==
The museum area comprises five historical buildings. The exhibition about the local history can be visited in a half-timbered house, built about 1750. From 1819 and 1868 it accommodated Prussia's first state-supported primary school in Gütersloh, before the corn-dealer Angenete & Wulfhorst opened its business there. In the year 1874 this enterprise built the brick building which was used as granary. Today the exhibitions about the history of medicine and industry are shown there. Since 1984 both buildings have been put under cultural heritage management.

The museum's management and -administration as well as the museum's café are accommodated in further half-timbered houses. The museum's store-room/depot is located outside of the actual museum's estate.

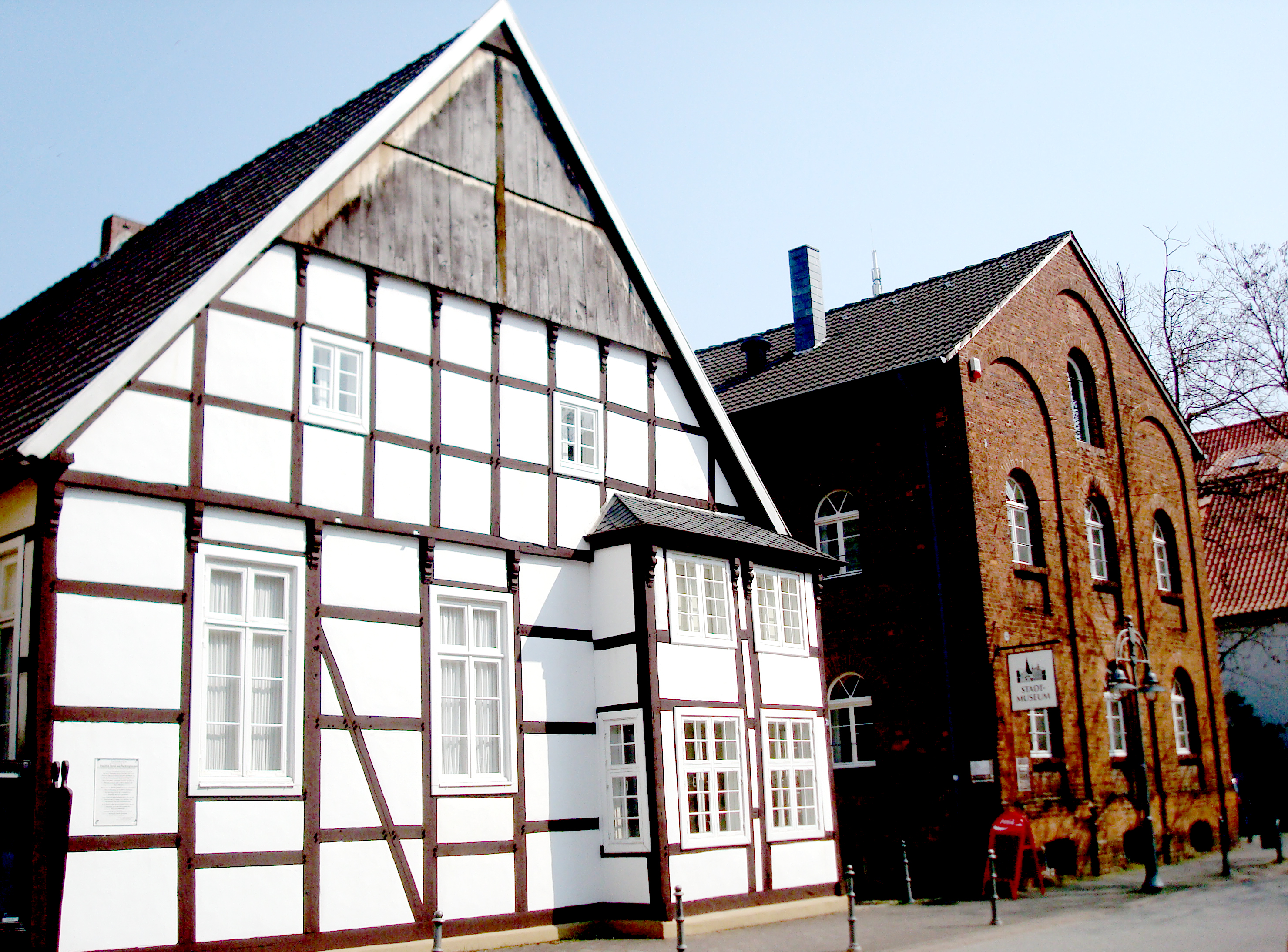
Half-timbered house, built about 1750, brick building, built in 1874

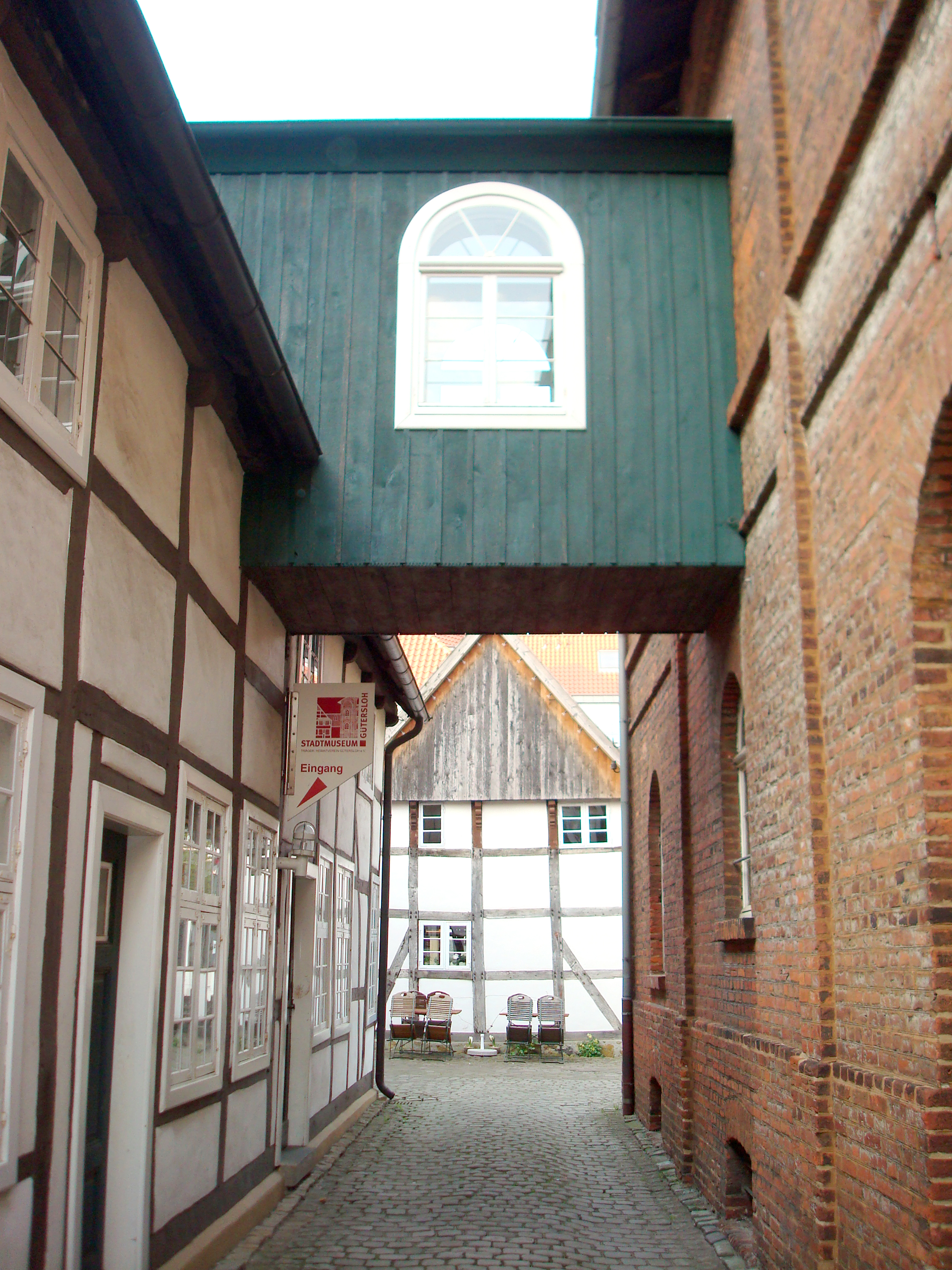
Bridge between the two historical buildings

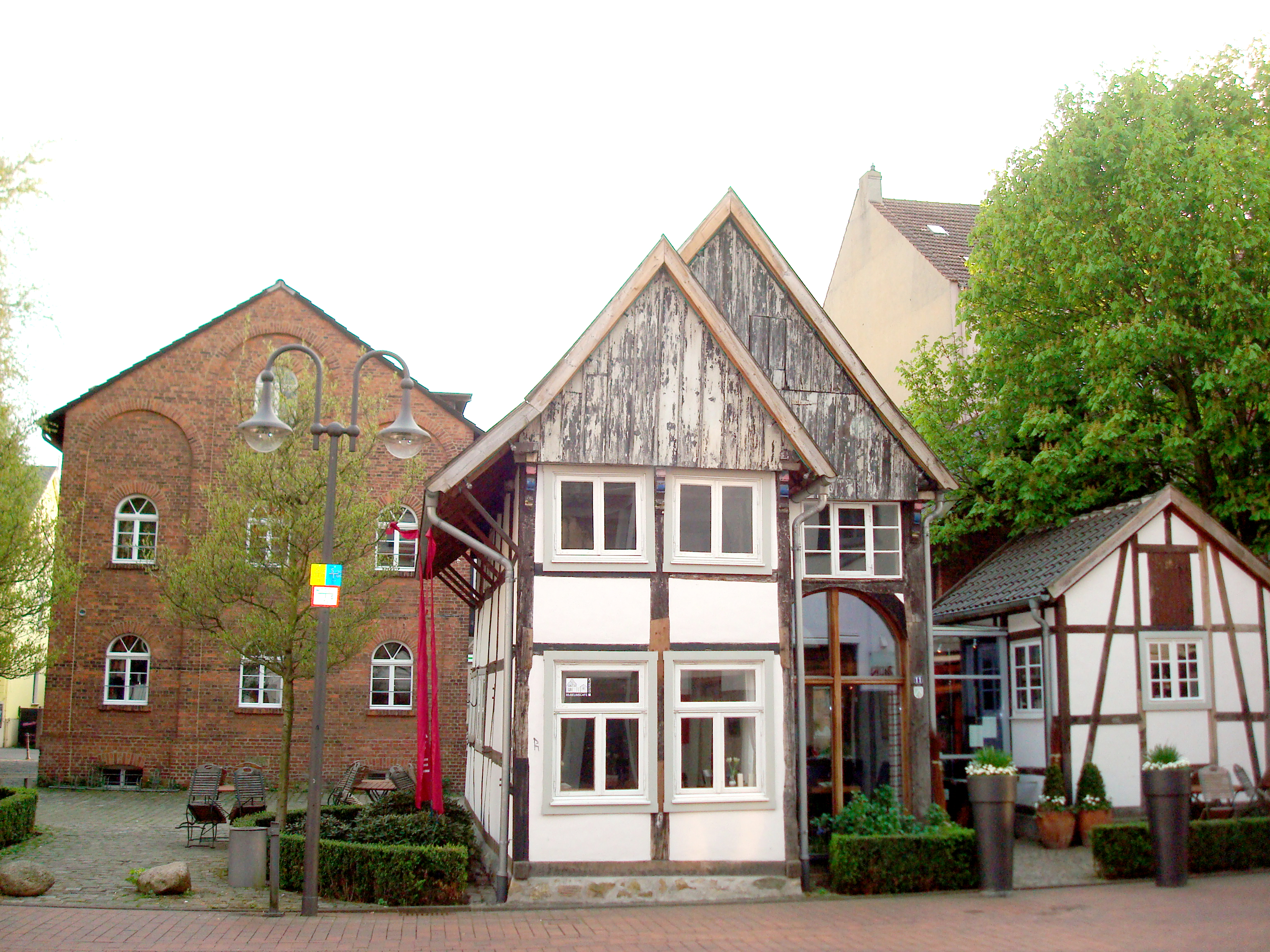
The museum's café

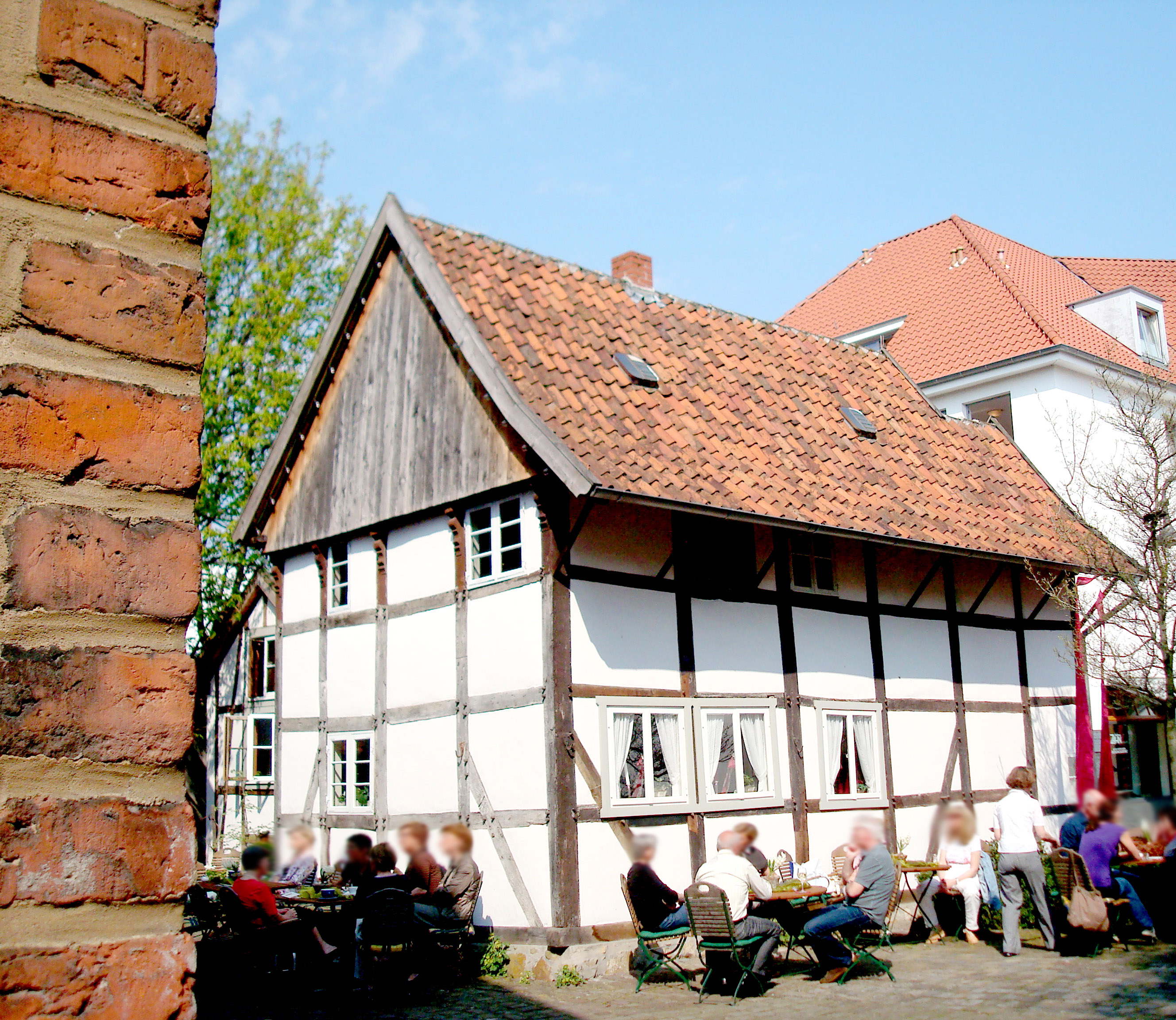
The museum's café

== Collections and exhibitions ==
In principle everything in connection with the town of Gütersloh is collected in the Stadtmuseum Gütersloh. The collections focus particularly on medicine, hygiene and health, economy and industry, media and media technology (due to the media trust Bertelsmann being domiciled in Gütersloh), toys and recreational activities. Its comprehensive inventory of collections, of which only a minor part can be exhibited due to the small available exhibition space, turns the museum into one of the largest regional museums.

== Local History of Gütersloh ==
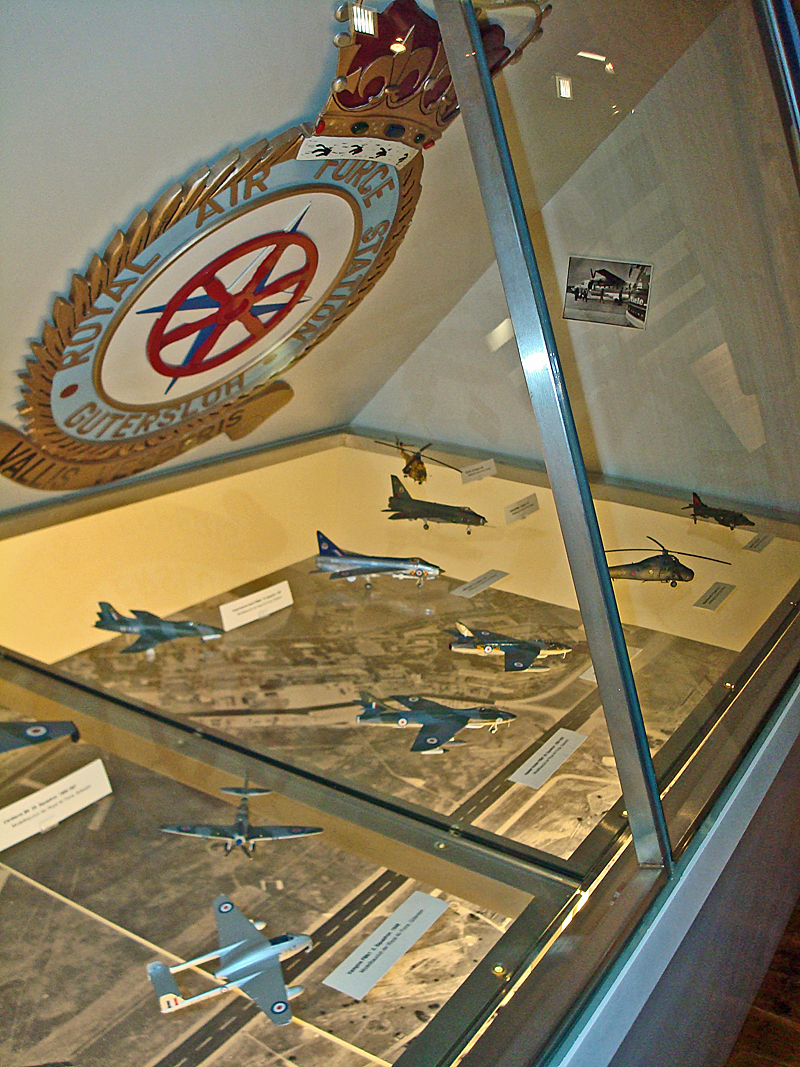
An important chapter in the local history of Gütersloh: RAF Gütersloh

The exhibition about Gütersloh's local history features artefacts from the bronze-age to modern testimonials of the digital revolution. Beside original prehistoric finds a replication of the approximately 3.500 years old, 40 cm high "Pavenstädter Riesenbecher" ("Giant Beaker of Pavenstädt" – Pavenstädt is an urban district of Gütersloh) is exhibited, one of the oldest testimonials of human settlements in Gütersloh's urban area. The former purpose of the half-timbered house is illustrated in a teacher's residence of about 1840 (Vormärz era). The exhibition about the local history mainly deals with the everyday life of families living in Gütersloh in 1868. The furnishing and basic commodities of one Protestant and one Catholic family are shown. Historical meteorological data commemorate Gütersloh's first weather station installed by the town's honorary citizen Dr. Friedrich Wilhelm Stohlmann.

The entire workshop of Gütersloh's coppersmith Thiro of the year 1900 is exhibited in the former horse stable of the half-timbered house. Three generations of the Thiro family worked with the exhibited equipment till 1977, producing – among others – pots, pans and distillation apparatus for the local distilleries.

A part of the exhibition deals with the topic "Gütersloh – Town of Patrons and Donors". Personalities, who campaigned for the town's public welfare by donation activities, are introduced – not only because the museum's existence is due to a donation. A prominent example is Reinhard Mohn who set up the oldest community foundation of Germany in 1996. Therefore, a bronze sculpture of Reinhard Mohn – created in 1986 by the sculptor Hubert Hartmann (1915–2006) coming from Wiedenbrück – is exhibited in this area.

== History of Medicine ==
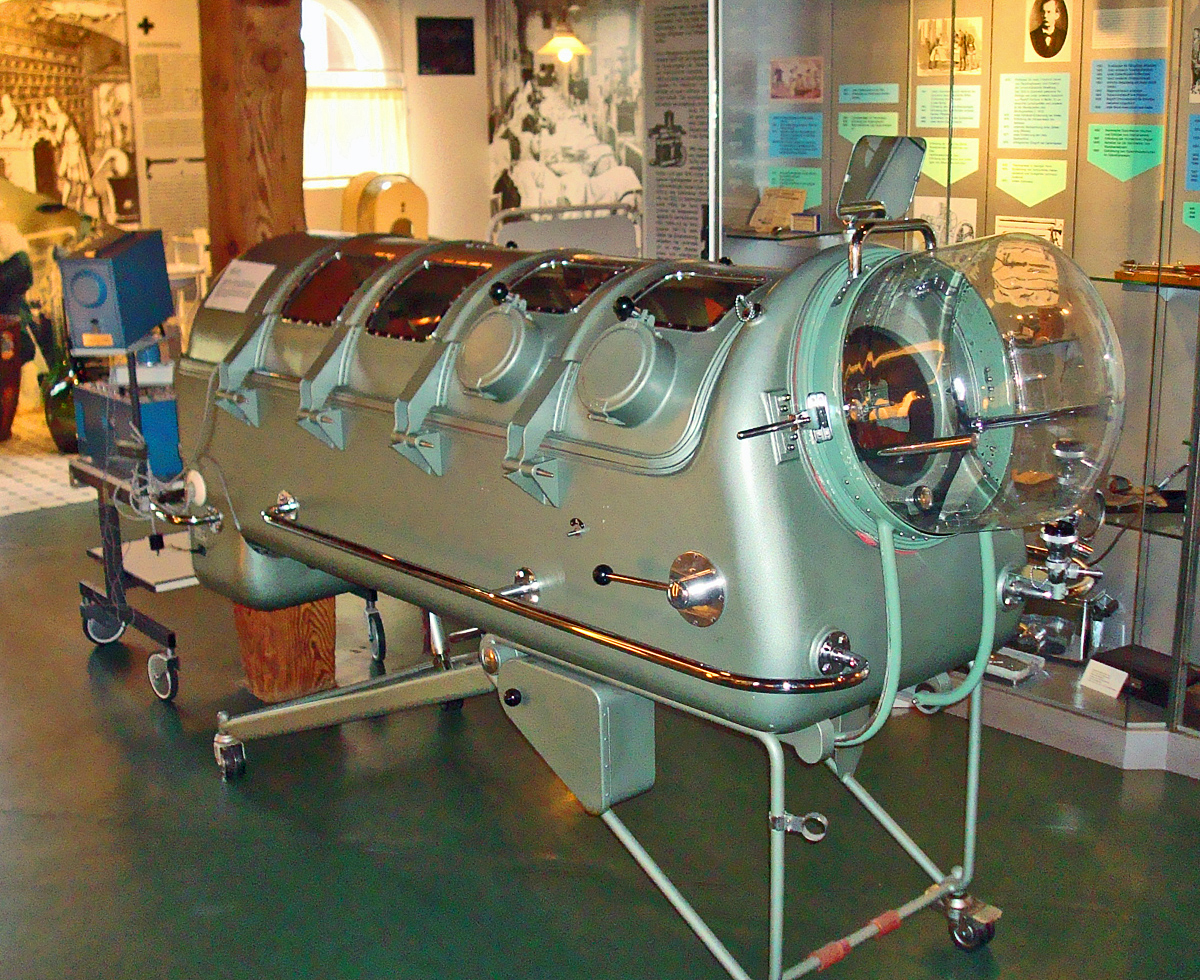
An iron lung from the 1950s

The exhibition dealing with the history of medicine is of supraregional importance and was granted a special prize of the European Museum of the Year Award in 1990. In this exhibition general developments of the history of medicine ("Medicine in ancient times, Middle Ages and modern times") are combined with local references (practice furnishing of Dr. Angenete, well-known doctors in Gütersloh). As Germany features only rather few medical-historic museums, this permanent exhibition is a flagship and the museum's unique selling proposition – at least in the regional museum landscape.

The collection was initiated by Dr. Wilhelm Angenete, a family doctor in Gütersloh. He bequeathed not only the buildings of the museum to the association for local history, but also the equipment of his practice, as for example medical instruments, furniture, a skeleton as well as educational material which partly dated from the 1920s and 1930s. Furthermore, the association managed to achieve substantial components of a store for cosmetics and healthcare of the year 1890 which was originally furnished as pharmacy.

These exhibits formed the basis for a collection which has meanwhile be completed among others by Robert Koch’s desk, which Koch – winner of the Nobel Prize in Physiology or Medicine for his tuberculosis findings in 1905 – used during his employment as director at the Institute for Hygiene of the University in Berlin (1885–1891). Further appreciable exhibits are the furnishing of two dental practices of the years 1925 and 1955, an X-ray machine, a cystoscope from the 1920s and an iron lung. Nowadays less than a dozen of these breathing machines are presented to the public in Germany.

In 1998 the town museum also took over the practice equipment of Dr. Kurt Heinrich (1908-1998), an oculist in Gütersloh. In addition to the permanent exhibition special- and travelling exhibitions about medical-historic topics take place in the town museum.

Exhibits of the medical-historic collection are often made available by the museum for special exhibitions of other museums. Following the idea of "History Marketing" also companies, associations, practices, health insurance companies or hospitals use the collection for exhibitions on the occasion of - for example - anniversaries. The Stadtmuseum Gütersloh grants the loan of its exhibits including expert device as "historical service" to make additional income.

== Industrial history ==
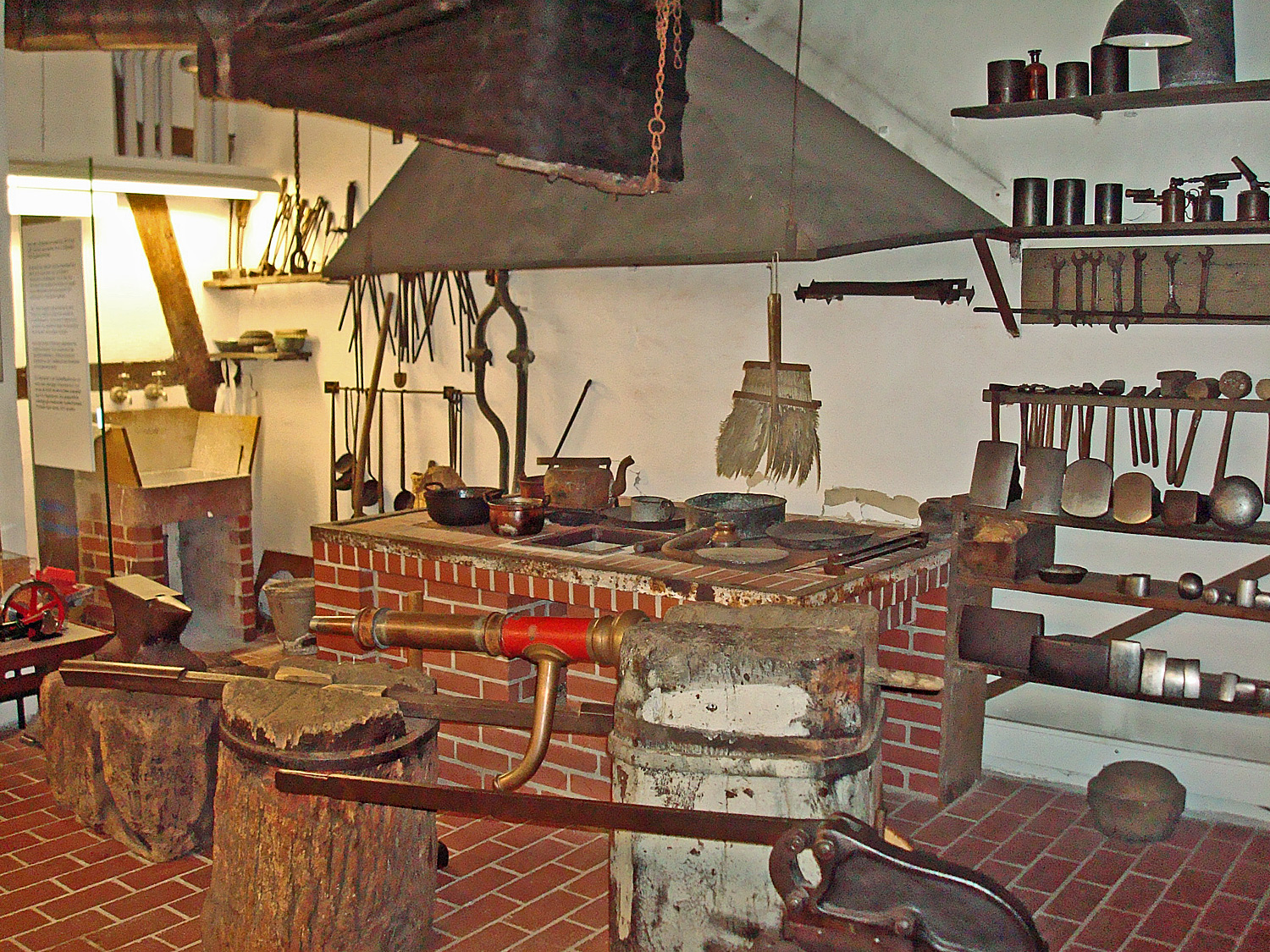
Workshop of a coppersmith (1900)

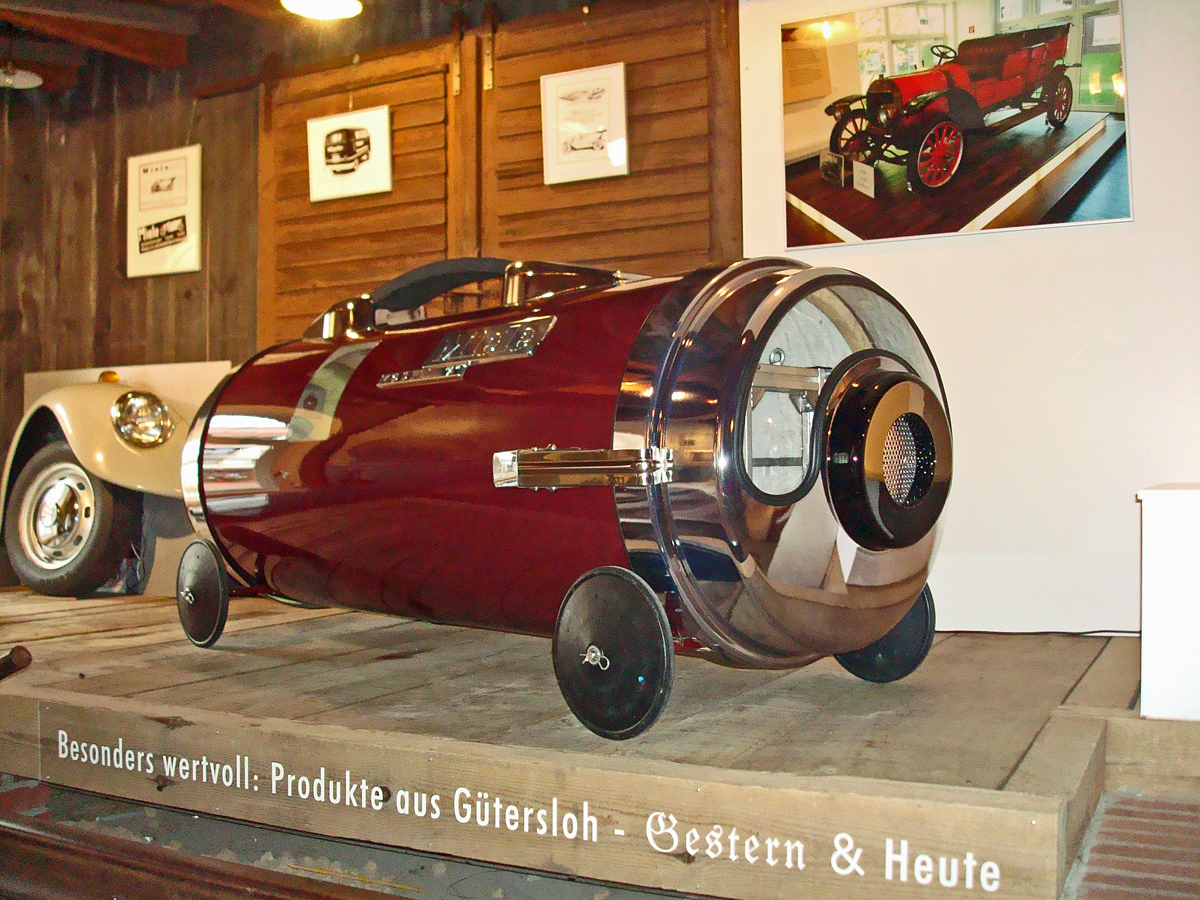
Miele

The second permanent exhibition deals with the industrial development in Germany. As companies of Gütersloh are taken as examples, it mainly focuses on the textile- and metal working industry. Apart from work benches and machines a fully functional mechanic weaving loom is exhibited. This permanent exhibition also refers to the topic "Washing and Washing Machine" with reference to Miele, a local manufacturer of household appliances.

== Special exhibitions ==
Special exhibitions either deal with local issues or feature travelling exhibitions. In case of local matters, the exhibitions concentrate on the town history including the development of industry, trade, traffic, culture, leisure time and formation. Corresponding to the focus of its collection regarding the history of medicine, exhibitions – either of the Stadtmuseum Gütersloh itself or of third parties - regularly take place in the town museum about this topic.

Following a tradition, a toy exhibition is organized in the winter months, which attracts - according to gathered experiences – a tremendous number of visitors. The most successful exhibitions were: an exhibition showing duplications of Gyro Gearloose’s inventions, “Busy Girl – Barbie works her way up“, “Everybody’s constructing by using Lego“ and a “Käthe Kruse”-exhibition.

== Museum’s Education ==
Pupils of primary schools are given the opportunity by the Stadtmuseum to become acquainted with the exhibitions in a playful and child-oriented way. Furthermore, they have the chance to get some background information of a museum. Therefore, museum rallies, guessing games, disguising actions and courses of textile manufacturing and wood working are offered. Furthermore, museum tours – particularly for children – and offers for children's birthday parties are available. A "museum’s doctor" and his "medical secretary" will explain to them the medical-historic collection. Furthermore, the Stadtmuseum Gütersloh disposes of portable wooden exhibition boxes. They contain material (for example referring to the paper manufacturing or the teaching of historical writing- and printing techniques) and are borrowed to schools for project work.
