= Dianne Odell =

American polio sufferer (1947–2008)

- Born: February 13, 1947
- Died: May 28, 2008 (aged 61); Jackson, Tennessee, U.S.
- Known for: Polio survivor
- Notable work: Children’s book "Blinky, Less Light" ISBN 9780892254712

Dianne Odell (February 13, 1947 – May 28, 2008) was an American woman from Tennessee who spent most of her life in an iron lung. She contracted bulbospinal polio at age 3 in 1950 and was confined to an iron lung for the rest of her life. Due to a spinal deformity caused by the polio, she was unable to change to a portable breathing device introduced in the late 1950s. Odell's condition was not as severe in youth and she could spend short periods outside the machine until her 20s; from then on she needed to be in it 24 hours a day. Caregivers could still slide Odell's bedding out of her iron lung for basic nursing care but only briefly.

Odell was among the individuals who used an iron lung for an exceptionally long period, depending on it for nearly 60 years. As of 2018, only three individuals in the United States continued to require iron lungs. Odell's iron lung, measuring seven feet in length and weighing 750 pounds, operated by generating alternating positive and negative pressures to facilitate inhalation and exhalation. She lay on her back with only her head exposed and made eye contact with visitors through an angled mirror. She was able to operate a television set with a small blow tube. She was cared for by her parents, other family members, and aides provided by a nonprofit foundation.

Odell had many successes in her life despite her condition. Although she could not attend high school, she completed her studies by having her classmates or teachers bring school assignments to her home, where she would read the answers into a Dictaphone or have friends or family transcribe them. She also learned to write with her toes. She graduated from high school in 1965 and subsequently took long-distance classes from Freed-Hardeman University. Although she was unable to earn a degree, she received an honorary degree in 1987. In 1992, Odell was profiled in Woman's World and received the Paul Harris Fellow Award from the Jackson Rotary Club, one of the club's highest honors.

In 1991, Odell began writing a children's book using a voice activated computer; it took 10 years to accomplish. The book, Blinky, Less Light, was published in 2001 and approximately 5,000 copies have been sold. Shortly after the book was published, Odell met former Vice President Al Gore at a Christmas Gala in her honor. This book was briefly mentioned by actress Jane Seymour in her 2004 work Remarkable Changes: Turning Life's Challenges into Opportunities. Odell first met Seymour in 2003, who also introduced her to Christopher Reeve.

In a 2001 interview with the Associated Press, Odell said she wrote her children's book to show youngsters, especially those with physical disabilities, that they should never give up. "It's amazing what you can accomplish if you see someone do the same thing," she said.

Her medical costs were approximately $60,000 per year. However, her family refused to institutionalize her. To help the family, the West Tennessee Healthcare Foundation and the Campbell Street Church of Christ established the Dianne Odell Fund. In 2001, a website was set up to provide users with a brief biography of Odell and a way to donate money or services to help with her care. A number of fundraisers, some featuring celebrities, were also held to raise money to allow her to remain at home.

On February 17, 2007, shortly after her 60th birthday, Odell was temporarily moved to The New Southern Hotel in Jackson for celebrations attended by approximately 200 guests and with a nine-foot (2.7 m) birthday cake. She also received letters and well-wishes from people all over the country. That same month, a German film crew visited her to do a story about her life.

Odell's life was threatened by power outages in 1957 and 1974 which disabled her respirator. However, she survived with the help of her family who hand-pumped the respirator until power was restored. In 1995, the Tennessee Valley Authority provided the Odell family with a generator large enough to power the house in case of future power outages.

Odell died on May 28, 2008, at age 61. A power failure and the failure of an emergency generator cut off her breathing device's functions. Family members attempted to use the emergency hand pump attached to the iron lung to keep her breathing, but their efforts were unsuccessful.
