= Martha Lillard =

American polio survivor (1948–2026)

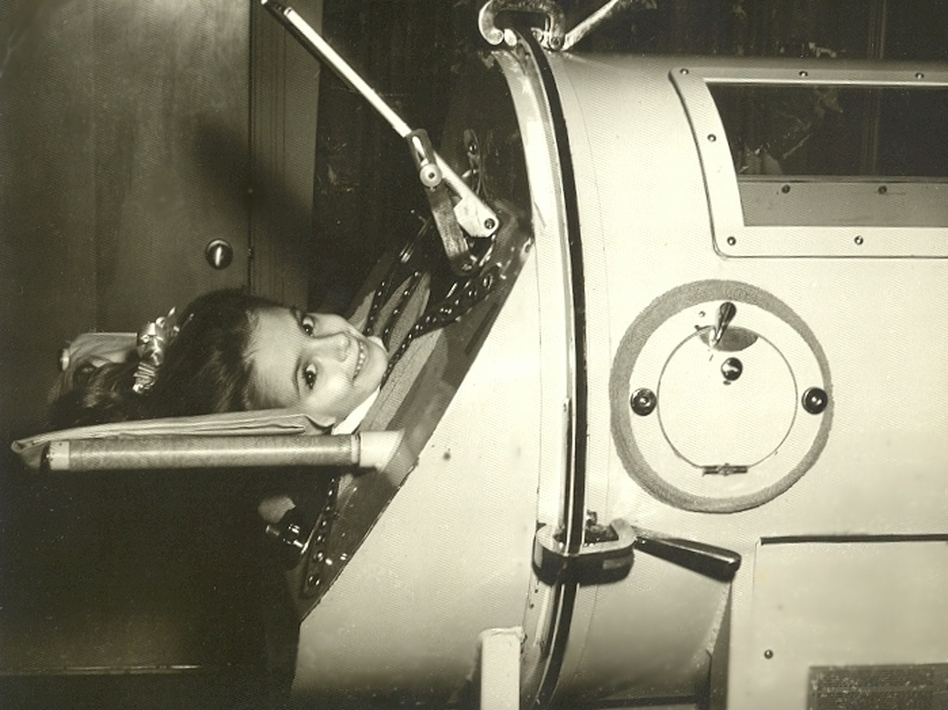
- Lillard in 1953
- Born: Martha Ann Lillard; June 8, 1948; Shawnee, Oklahoma, U.S.
- Died: June 26, 2026 (aged 78); Shawnee, Oklahoma, U.S.
- Known for: Last known person to use an iron lung in the United States
- Spouse(s): Ray Stapp Baha Salh (m. 2026)

Martha Ann Lillard (June 8, 1948 – June 26, 2026) was an American polio survivor who, following Paul Alexander's death, became the last known person in the United States who still relied on an iron lung. She contracted polio in 1953, when she was five years old.

== Early life ==
Martha Ann Lillard was born on June 8, 1948, in Shawnee, Oklahoma. She had a sister named Cindy and a brother-in-law named Daryl.

== Life in the iron lung ==
Lillard celebrated her fifth birthday on June 8, 1953, with a party at Joyland, an amusement park in Kansas. On June 17, 1953, she woke up with a sore throat and pain in her neck. Her family took her to the hospital, where she was diagnosed with polio.

Later, she spent six months in the hospital, placed in a negative pressure ventilator, informally called the iron lung, to help her breathe. In the end, she chose to use the iron lung for the rest of her life, sleeping in it nightly. In an NBC News interview in 2012, she said that when she was first put in the iron lung, "it was a huge relief." She said of the ventilator, "That's what keeps me healthy. That's what heals me. That's what allows me to breathe the next day."

Early in the 21st century, Lillard became trapped in her iron lung when an ice storm came through Oklahoma and her emergency generator failed to start, leaving her trapped in the device without heat. She struggled to call 911. She described the experience as "like being buried alive almost, you know – it's so scary."

After the death of Paul Alexander on March 11, 2024, Lillard became the last known person in the United States to still rely on an iron lung.

In 2025, Lillard suffered an episode when she struggled to breathe when a tornado caused a power outage and her generator failed. Her husband saved her life by giving her mouth-to-mouth resuscitation until emergency assistance arrived.

== Personal life and death ==
Lillard spent much of her time alone. She painted, watched old Hollywood movies, and took care of her beagles. She sought isolation throughout the COVID-19 pandemic, seeing her relatives in the evenings.

Lillard was homeschooled for most of her childhood and unable to participate in most extracurricular activities, but could remember that she had wanted to go camping with her siblings. She could not have children or hold a steady job because of her physical limitations. However, she was married twice; her first husband was Ray Stapp, whom she said that she met in 1989 and married for 28 years until he was moved to a nursing home. She met her second husband online and married him in February 2026 after 22 years of courtship.

In a 2021 interview segment about her by National Public Radio, Radio Diaries, and All Things Considered, she said she was having trouble finding replacement parts to keep her machine running.

Lillard died on June 26, 2026, at the age of 78.
