= Glossopharyngeal breathing =

Gulping air into the lungs

Glossopharyngeal breathing (GPB, glossopharyngeal insufflation, buccal pumping, or frog breathing) is a means of pistoning air into the lungs to volumes greater than can be achieved by the person's breathing muscles (greater than maximum inspiratory capacity). The technique involves the use of the glottis to add to an inspiratory effort by gulping boluses of air into the lungs. It can be beneficial for individuals with weak inspiratory muscles and no ability to breathe normally on their own.

The technique was first observed by physicians in the late 1940s in polio patients at Rancho Los Amigos Hospital, in Los Angeles, by Dr. Clarence W. Dail and first described by Dail in 1951 in the journal California Medicine.

Both inspiratory and, indirectly, expiratory muscle function can be assisted by GPB. GPB can provide an individual with weak inspiratory muscles and no vital capacity or ventilator-free breathing tolerance with normal alveolar ventilation and perfect safety when not using a ventilator or in the event of sudden ventilator failure day or night. The technique involves the use of the glottis to add to an inspiratory effort by projecting (gulping) boluses of air into the lungs. The glottis closes with each "gulp". One breath usually consists of 6 to 9 gulps of 40 to 200 ml each. During the training period the efficiency of GPB can be monitored by spirometrically measuring the milliliters of air per gulp, gulps per breath, and breaths per minute. A training manual and numerous videos are available, the most detailed of which was produced in 1999. For those who can not master GPB it is often because of inability of the soft palate to seal off the nose.

Although severe oropharyngeal muscle weakness can limit the usefulness of GPB, researchers have cited Duchenne muscular dystrophy ventilator users who were very successful using it. Approximately 60% of ventilator users with no autonomous ability to breathe and good bulbar muscle function can use GPB for autonomous breathing from a span of minutes up to all day. Patients with no vital capacity have awoken from sleep using GPB to discover that their ventilators were no longer functioning. Some have spontaneously come out of anesthesia frog breathing and others out of grand mal convulsions surprisingly without being cyanotic.

== See also ==
- Paul Alexander – American polio survivor and writer who used the technique (1946–2024)
- Buccal pumping
