= Paul Alexander (polio survivor) =

American polio survivor, attorney and writer (1946–2024)

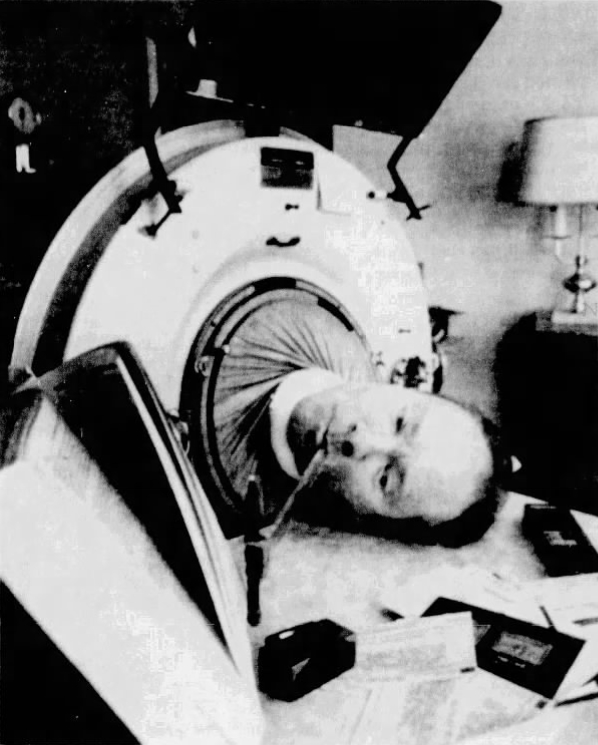
- Alexander in 1986
- Born: Paul Richard Alexander; January 30, 1946; Dallas, Texas, U.S.
- Died: March 11, 2024 (aged 78); Dallas, Texas, U.S.
- Other names: The Man in the Iron Lung; Polio Paul
- Education: Southern Methodist University; University of Texas at Austin (BA, JD)
- Occupations: Attorney; author

TikTok information
- Page: Paul "Polio Paul" Alexander
- Followers: 451,848
- Last updated: 31 January 2026

Paul Richard Alexander (January 30, 1946 – March 11, 2024) was an American paralytic polio survivor, attorney, and author. After contracting polio in 1952 at the age of six, he spent the remainder his life in an iron lung, and is recognized as the person to have spent the longest period of time occupying one at almost 72 years. Decades following his disablement, Alexander earned a bachelor's degree and Juris Doctor at the University of Texas at Austin, and was admitted to the bar in 1986. He self-published a memoir in 2020 and, late in life, built a following on TikTok.

== Life ==
Alexander was born on January 30, 1946, in Dallas to Gus Nicholas Alexander, the child of Greek immigrants, and Doris Marie Emmett, of Lebanese descent. He contracted polio at the age of six and, within a week of developing symptoms, lost the ability to breathe independently and was paralyzed for life, only able to move his head, neck, and mouth.

During a major U.S. outbreak of polio in the early 1950s, hundreds of children around Dallas, Texas, including Alexander, were taken to Parkland Hospital, in which children were treated in a ward of iron lungs. He almost died in the hospital before a doctor noticed he was not breathing and rushed him into one of the lungs.

Alexander spent almost eighteen months in the hospital, his health marginally improving but his paralysis remaining permanent. At discharge in late 1953, his parents rented a portable generator and a truck to bring him and his iron lung home. Beginning in 1954, with help from the March of Dimes and a physical therapist named Mrs. Sullivan, Alexander taught himself glossopharyngeal breathing, which allowed him to leave the iron lung for gradually increasing periods of time.

Alexander was one of the Dallas Independent School District's first home schooled students. He learned to memorize instead of taking notes. At the age of twenty-one, he graduated second in his class from W. W. Samuell High School in 1967, becoming the first person to graduate from a Dallas high school without physically attending a class.

Alexander received a scholarship to Southern Methodist University. He transferred to the University of Texas at Austin, where he earned a bachelor's degree in 1978, then a Juris Doctor in 1984. Before he was admitted to the bar in 1986, he was employed as an instructor of legal terminology to court stenographers at an Austin trade school. He represented clients in court in a three-piece suit and a modified wheelchair that held his body upright.

Alexander has been recognized by Guinness World Records as the person who has spent the longest amount of time living in an iron lung.

Alexander started a TikTok account in January 2024, on which he posted videos discussing his life. He had amassed more than 330,000 followers on the site at the time of his death two months later.

Alexander died in Dallas on March 11, 2024, at age 78. Although he had been hospitalized for COVID-19 in February, the actual cause of death was unclear. He was one of the last two people still using the technology, alongside Martha Lillard, who first entered an iron lung in 1953.

== Book ==
Alexander self-published his memoir, Three Minutes for a Dog: My Life in an Iron Lung, in April 2020 with the assistance of friend and former nurse Norman D. Brown. Alexander spent more than eight years writing the book, using a plastic stick and a pen to tap out on a keyboard or by dictating the words to his friend.
