= Negative pressure ventilator =

Medical technology

A negative pressure ventilator (NPV) is a type of mechanical ventilator that stimulates an ill person's breathing by periodically applying negative air pressure to their body to expand and contract the chest cavity.

== Description ==
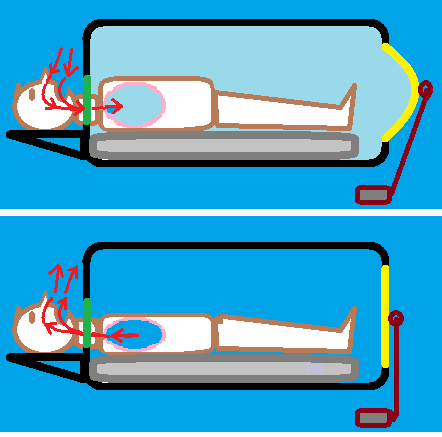
Iron lung cylinder (black), patient head exposed through sealed opening. Diaphragm (yellow) mechanically extends, and then retracts, varying cylinder air pressure and causing the patient's chest to expand (top), and then contract (bottom)

In most NPVs (such as the iron lung in the diagram), the negative pressure is applied to the patient's torso, or entire body below the neck, to cause their chest to expand, expanding their lungs, drawing air into the patient's lungs through their airway, assisting (or forcing) inhalation. When negative pressure is released, the chest naturally contracts, compressing the lungs, causing exhalation. In some cases, positive external pressure may be applied to the torso to further stimulate exhalation.

Another form of NPV device (such as the Pulmotor) is placed at the patient's airway, and alternates negative pressure with positive pressure to pump air into their lungs (inhale under positive pressure), then suck it back out (exhale under negative pressure).

== Usage ==
Negative pressure ventilators, while widely used in the early-to-mid 20th century (particularly for victims of the polio epidemics), are now largely replaced by positive-pressure airway ventilators, which force air (or oxygen) directly into the patient's airway. However, researchers and clinicians still find some uses for NPVs, owing to their specific advantages.

Research and developments in artificial ventilation, both negative-pressure and positive-pressure, result in evolving assessments of the benefits and hazards of negative-pressure ventilators (NPVs). Different researchers and clinicians have made varying assessments, over time, about the primary positive and negative aspects of NPVs. A sampling includes:

=== Advantages ===
Generally, NPVs are best with patients who have neuromuscular diseases, but normal lung compliance (a measure of the lungs' ability to expand and contract). They are effective for various conditions, especially neuromuscular and skeletal disorders, particularly for long-term night-time ventilation. They are effective in patients who have severe respiratory acidosis, impaired consciousness, are unable to tolerate a facial mask (due to facial deformity, or claustrophobia, or excess airway secretions), and in children. Continuous external negative pressure ventilation (CENPV) was found in a 2015 study to "[improve] oxygenation under [a greater number of] physiological conditions", concurrent with lower "airway," "transpulmonary," and "intra-abdominal" pressures, than experienced with continuous positive pressure ventilation (CPPV), in study of adult respiratory distress syndrome (ARDS) patients, possibly reducing high ARDS mortality.

=== Disadvantages ===
NPVs do not work well if patient's lung compliance is decreased, or their lung resistance is increased. They result in a greater vulnerability of the airway to aspiration, such as inhalation of vomit or swallowed liquids, than with intermittent positive pressure ventilation. They exacerbate obstructive sleep apnea. The device is not portable and its installation may be difficult. Patients must sleep in a supine position.

== Types of NPVs ==
There are several types of NPVs, including:

- Iron lung, also known as a tank ventilator, Drinker tank or Emerson tank;
- Cuirass ventilator, also known as a chest shell, turtle shell or tortoise shell;
- exovent;
- jacket ventilator, also known as a poncho or raincoat ventilator;
- Pulmotor.

=== Iron lung ===
The iron lung, also known as the tank ventilator, Drinker tank or Emerson tank, was the first common pure-NPV device when it was developed in the 1920s by Drinker, Shaw and Mason. It is a large, sealed horizontal cylinder (or "tank") in which the patient lies, with their head protruding from a sealed opening at one end of the tank. An air pump or a flexible diaphragm (usually motor-driven) varies the air pressure inside the tank, in continuous alternations, lowering and raising the air pressure in the cylinder. This causes the patient's chest to rise and fall, stimulating inhalation and exhalation through the patient's nose and mouth (which are outside the cylinder, exposed to ambient air pressure).

=== Cuirass ventilator ===
The cuirass ventilator, also known as the chest shell, turtle shell or tortoise shell, is a more compact variation of the iron lung which only encloses the patient's torso and is sealed around their neck and waist, and depressurized and repressurized by an external pump or portable ventilator.

=== Exovent ===
The exovent is a modern device similar to the cuirass ventilator, but developed in 2020, in response to the COVID-19 pandemic.

=== Jacket ventilator ===
The jacket ventilator, also known as a poncho or raincoat ventilator, is a lighter version of the iron lung or the cuirass ventilator, constructed of an airtight material (such as plastic or rubber) arranged over a light metal or plastic frame, or screen, and depressurized and repressurized by a portable ventilator.

=== Positive-and-negative pressure ventilator ===
==== Pulmotor ====
The Pulmotor is a device developed in the early 1900s which was the forerunner of modern mechanical ventilators. It used pressure from a tank of compressed oxygen to operate a valve system that alternately forced air into and out of a person's airway, using alternating positive and negative air pressure. Although portable, and able to be used by lay persons and non-medical emergency responders, some medical personnel criticized it as dangerous (in part due to the risks of barotrauma or vomiting) and inefficient.
