= Christiaan =

Dutch masculine given name

- Pronunciation: Dutch: [ˈkrɪstijaːn]
- Gender: mainly male

Origin
- Languages: Egyptian, via Greek and Latin, used to translate Hebrew
- Origin: Christianus
- Meaning: "follower of Christ"

Other names
- See also: Christian (given name), Christian (surname)

Christiaan is a Dutch, Flemish, and Afrikaans male given name. An archaic spelling of the name was Christiaen with "ae" to indicate the long sound "a".

People with the name include:

- Christiaan van Adrichem (1533–1585), Dutch Catholic priest and theological writer
- Christiaan Andriessen (1775–1846), Dutch painter
- Christiaan Bailey (born 1981), American surfer
- Christiaan Bakkes (born 1965), South African writer
- Christiaan Bangeman Huygens (1772–1857), Dutch diplomat and civil servant
- Christiaan Barnard (1922–2001), South African cardiac surgeon known for his heart transplants
- Christiaan Basson (born 1982), South African golfer
- Christiaan Berger (1911–1965), Dutch sprinter
- Christiaan Beyers (1869–1914), South African Boer general during the Second Boer War
- Christiaan Bezuidenhout (born 1994), South African golfer
- Christiaan Frederick Beyers Naudé (1915–2004), South African cleric, theologian, and anti-apartheid activist
- Christiaen Jansz van Bieselingen (1558–1600), Dutch genre and portrait painter
- Christiaan Boers (1889–1942), Dutch Royal Netherlands Army captain during World War II
- Christiaan Both (1895–1977), Dutch sport shooter
- Christiaan Both (ecologist) (born 1969), Dutch ecologist
- Christiaan Brosch (1878–1969), Dutch sport shooter
- Christiaan Bruil (born 1970), Dutch badminton player
- Christiaan Brunings (1736–1805), Dutch hydraulic engineer
- Christiaan Cicek (born 1988), Dutch football striker
- Christiaan Coevershoff (1595–1659), Dutch painter
- Christiaan Cornelissen (1864–1942), Dutch syndicalist writer, economist, and trade unionist
- Christiaen van Couwenbergh (1604–1667), Dutch historical/allegorical painter
- Christiaan de Bruin (born 1990), South African rugby player
- Christiaan de Wet (1854–1922), South African Boer general, rebel leader and politician
- Christiaan De Wilde (born 1960s), Belgian businessman
- Christiaan du Toit (1901–1982), South African military commander
- Christiaan Eijkman (1858–1930), Dutch physician, physiologist and Nobel Prize laureate
- Christiaan Justus Enschedé (1788–1829), Dutch newspaper editor and printer
- Christiaan Freeling (born 1947), Dutch game designer and inventor of abstract strategy games
- Christiaan Willem Fokma (1927–2012), Dutch sculptor and ceramist
- Christiaan van der Goes (1530s–1600), Dutch nobleman, schout of Delft
- Christiaan Groepe (1789–1886), Khoi military leader in the Cape Colony
- Christiaan Harmse (born 1973), South African hammer thrower
- Christiaan Heij (born 1950s), Dutch mathematician
- Christiaan Hendrik Muller (1865–1945), South African Boer War general
- Christiaan Huijgens (1897–1963), Dutch long-distance runner
- Christiaan Huygens (1629–1695), Dutch physicist, mathematician, astronomer and inventor
- Christiaan Jonker (born 1986), South African cricketer
- Christiaan Josi (1768–1828), Dutch engraver and art dealer
- Christiaan Kok (born 1971), Zimbabwean cricketer
- Christiaan Kriens (1881–1934), Belgian-born American composer, pianist, violinist and conductor
- Christiaan Emil Marie Küpper (1883–1931), Dutch artist, founder of De Stijl, better known as "Theo van Doesburg"
- Christiaan Kuyvenhoven (born 1985), Dutch pianist
- Christiaan Lans (1789–1843), Dutch colonial head of the Dutch Gold Coast 1834-36
- Christiaan Frederik Louis Leipoldt (1880–1947), South African poet, dramatist, medical doctor, reporter and food expert
- Christiaan van Lennep (1887–1955), Dutch tennis player
- Christiaan Lindemans (1912–1946), Dutch double agent during the Second World War
- Christiaan Luyckx (1623–c.1675), Flemish still life painter
- Christiaan Moltzer (1875–1945), Dutch sport shooter
- Christiaan Monden (born 1975), Dutch sociologist
- Christiaan Müller (1690–1763), German-born Dutch organ builder
- Christiaan Nagel (born 1982), South African-born British street artist
- Christiaan Neumeier (1921–1991), Dutch rower
- Christiaan Benjamin Nieuwenhuis (1863–1922), Dutch photographer in the Dutch East Indies
- Christiaan Offringa (fl. 2001–2005), Dutch curler
- Christiaan Hendrik Persoon (1761–1836), Dutch mycologist
- Christiaan Pförtner (born 1966), German football midfielder
- Christiaan van Pol (1752–1813), Dutch flower painter
- Christiaan Roets (born 1980), South African-born Welsh rugby player
- Christiaan Scholtz (born 1970), South African rugby player
- Christiaan Sepp (c. 1710 – 1775), German-born Dutch entomologist and artist
- Christiaan Slieker (1861–1945), Dutch early film exhibitor
- Christiaan Snouck Hurgronje (1857–1936), Dutch scholar of Oriental cultures and languages
- Christiaan Snyman (born 1996), Namibian cricketer
- Christiaan Steyn (1897–?), South African sprinter
- Christiaen Striep (1634–1673), Dutch still-life painter
- Christiaan Timmermans (born 1941), Dutch law professor and judge
- Christiaan Tonnet (1902–1946), Dutch equestrian and modern pentathlete
- Christiaan Tonnis (born 1956), German symbolist/realist painter, draftsman, and video artist
- Christiaan Maurits van den Heever (1902–1957), Afrikaans novelist, poet, essayist, and biographer
- Christiaan Van Vuuren (born 1982), Australian actor and video blogger
- Christiaan Varenhorst (born 1990), Dutch beach volleyball player
- Christiaan van Velzen (born 1932), Dutch sport shooter
- Christiaen van Vianen (1598–1671), Dutch silversmith and draughtsman
- Christiaan Viljoen (born 1961), South African tennis player
