= Bothe =

Bothe is a surname. Notable people with the surname include:

- Detlef Bothe (canoeist) (born 1957), East German sprint canoeist
- Detlef Bothe (actor) (born 1965), German actor
- Elsbeth Levy Bothe (1927–2013), American attorney and judge
- Hans-Werner Bothe (born 1952), German philosopher and neurosurgeon
- Heinz-Jürgen Bothe (born 1941), German Olympic rower
- Herta Bothe (1921–2000), female Nazi concentration camp guard
- Ida Bothe (fl. 1881–1890), German-American artist and educator
- Roger Bothe (born 1988), American soccer player
- Sabine Bothe (born 1960), German handball goalkeeper
- Stephan Bothe (born 1984), German politician
- Walther Bothe (1891–1957), German nuclear physicist and winner of the Nobel Prize in Physics

== See also ==
- Bothie (dog), only dog to go to both the North and South poles
- Bothe-Napa Valley State Park, a state park of California, USA
- Bodhe (disambiguation)
- Both (disambiguation)
- Botha, a surname
- Bothy, a shelter
