= Both (surname) =

Both is a surname. Notable people with the surname include:

- Andries Both (1612/1613–1642), Dutch painter
- Bob Both (born 1952), American record producer
- Christiaan Both (1895–1977), Dutch sports shooter
- Donald Both (1914–2005), Australian inventor, brother of Edward Both
- Christiaan Both (ecologist) (born 1969), Dutch ecologist
- Edward Both (1908–1987), Australian inventor
- Jan Dirksz Both (1610 and 1618–1652), Dutch painter
- Kuno-Hans von Both (1884–1955), German World War II general
- Marcus Both (born 1979), Australian golfer
- Miklós Both (born 1981), Hungarian musician
- Paul Both, German World War II soldier
- Pieter Both (1568–1615), first Governor-General of the Dutch East Indies

== See also ==
- Botha, a common Afrikaans surname
