= Both =

Both may refer to:

== People ==
- Both (surname)

== Music ==
- The Both, an American musical duo consisting of Aimee Mann and Ted Leo; also their self-titled first album
- "Both" (song), by Gucci Mane featuring Drake
- BOTH, Belgian-French musical duo known for the 2014 single "Straight Outta Line"
- Both, a single by Tiësto with 21 Savage and Bia (2023)

== Other uses ==
- Both (film), a 2005 film about an intersex stunt woman in San Francisco
- Both, a 2004 book by Douglas Crase
- Both respirator, a medical "iron lung" made from more inexpensive plywood
