= BWD Electronics =

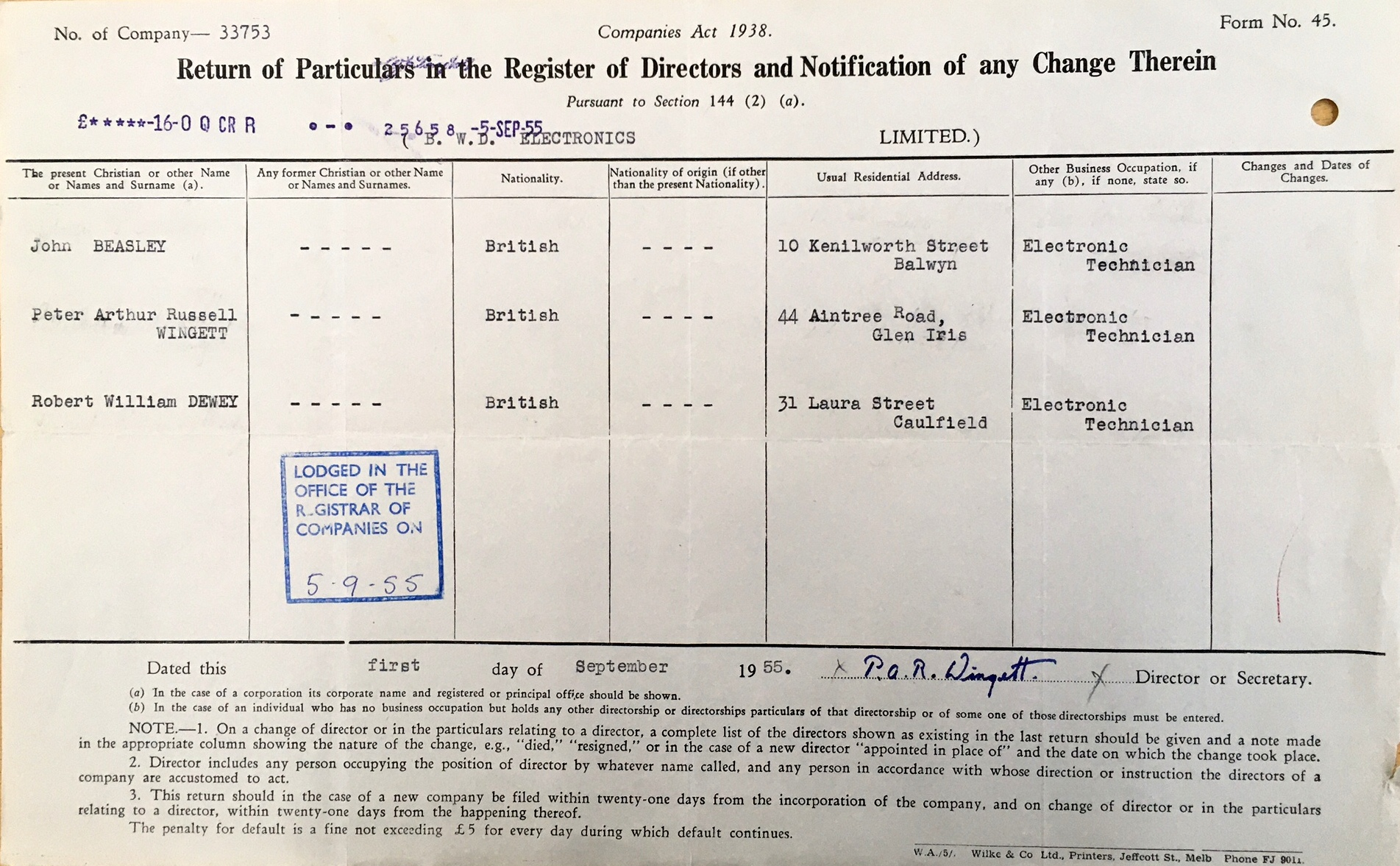
Partners in BWD 1955

BWD Electronics was an Australian manufacturer of electronics test equipment, based in Melbourne, Victoria, best known for their range of oscilloscopes.

== History ==
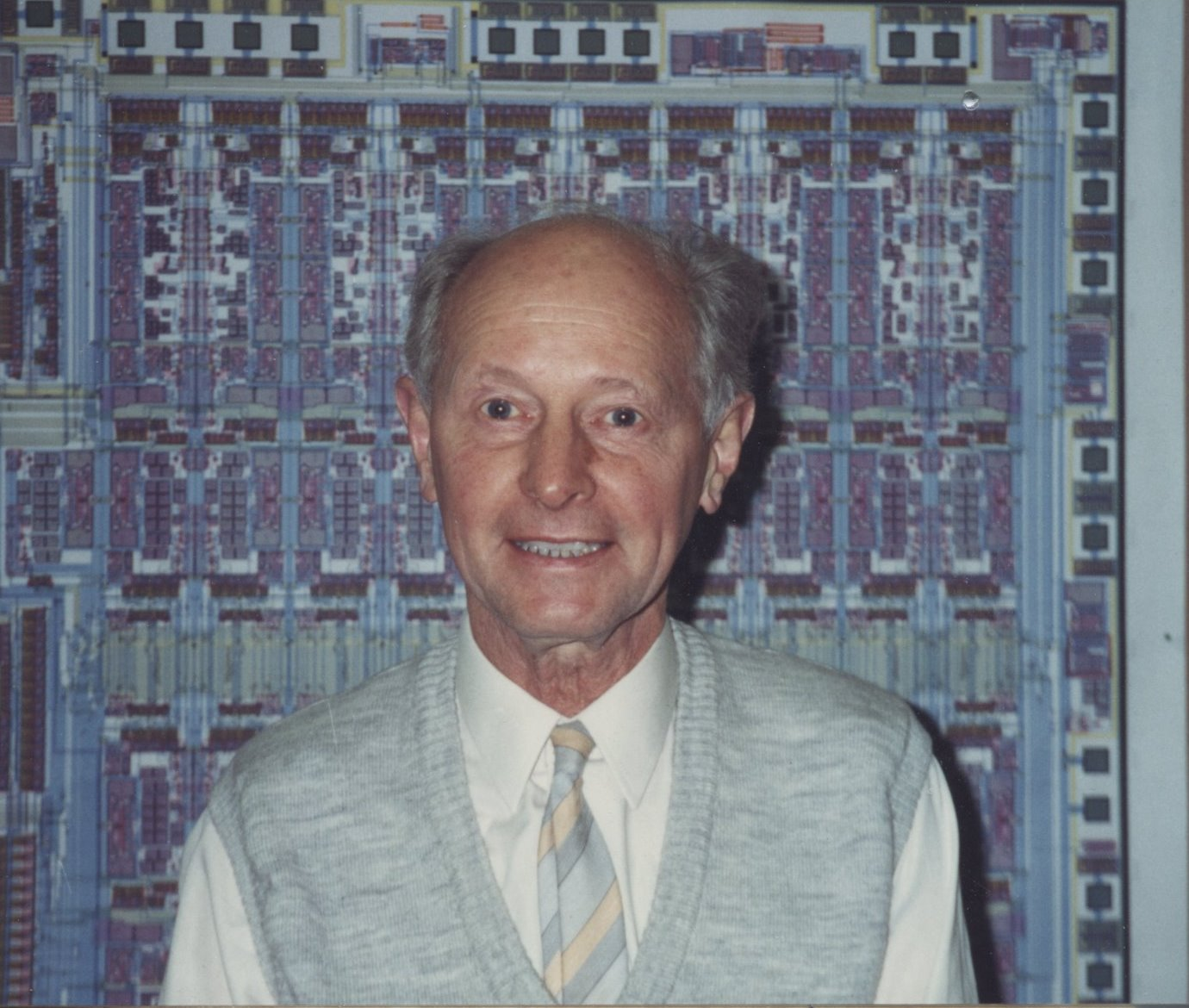
John Beesley. Behind him is a plot of a silicon chip to analyse sound for a cochlear implant

BWD was founded in 1955 by three relatively recently arrived British electronic technicians: John Beesley, Peter Wingett and Robert Dewey, in rented premises at 108 Auburn Road, Auburn, Victoria. Beesley was the only technically active member of the partnership. Wingett's and Dewey's holdings were bought out by Bruce Owen. Some of their earliest work was for the CSIRO Wool Textile Research Laboratory (W.T.R.L.) in Geelong, for which they contracted to supply a "Q meter", (Note: The nature of this device has not been found. A Q meter as used for analysis of tuned circuits would not be useful in materials research, but could refer to analysis of some analogous quality, such as resistance to creasing. In the mid-1950s CSIRO developed a wool fabric treatment SiroSet, for which such a device would be applicable.) DC amplifier and four pen recorder amplifiers. The Both Brothers company was contracted to supply pen recorders in the same Gazette.

The company had a reputation for "well-engineered and affordable products", using readily obtainable components.

The range of instruments designed and manufactured "in-house" was impressive — oscilloscopes from lightweight 3-inch models drawing less than 20 watts of power to a 17-inch model for classroom use, an analog storage 'scope and a true dual-beam 'scope. They produced an audio oscillator with lower distortion than the big-name imports and at a fraction of their price.

Other products included the Mini-Lab which was a combination of many instruments. These were very popular in teaching institutes because they had everything needed for lab experiments in one instrument. It included a sine/square/ramp function generator, a ±15 V bipolar power supply, isolated +ve and -ve independently adjustable power supplies, 12.6 V centre-tapped mains frequency AC supply, a 0–200V DC supply and a variable gain voltage/operational amplifier.

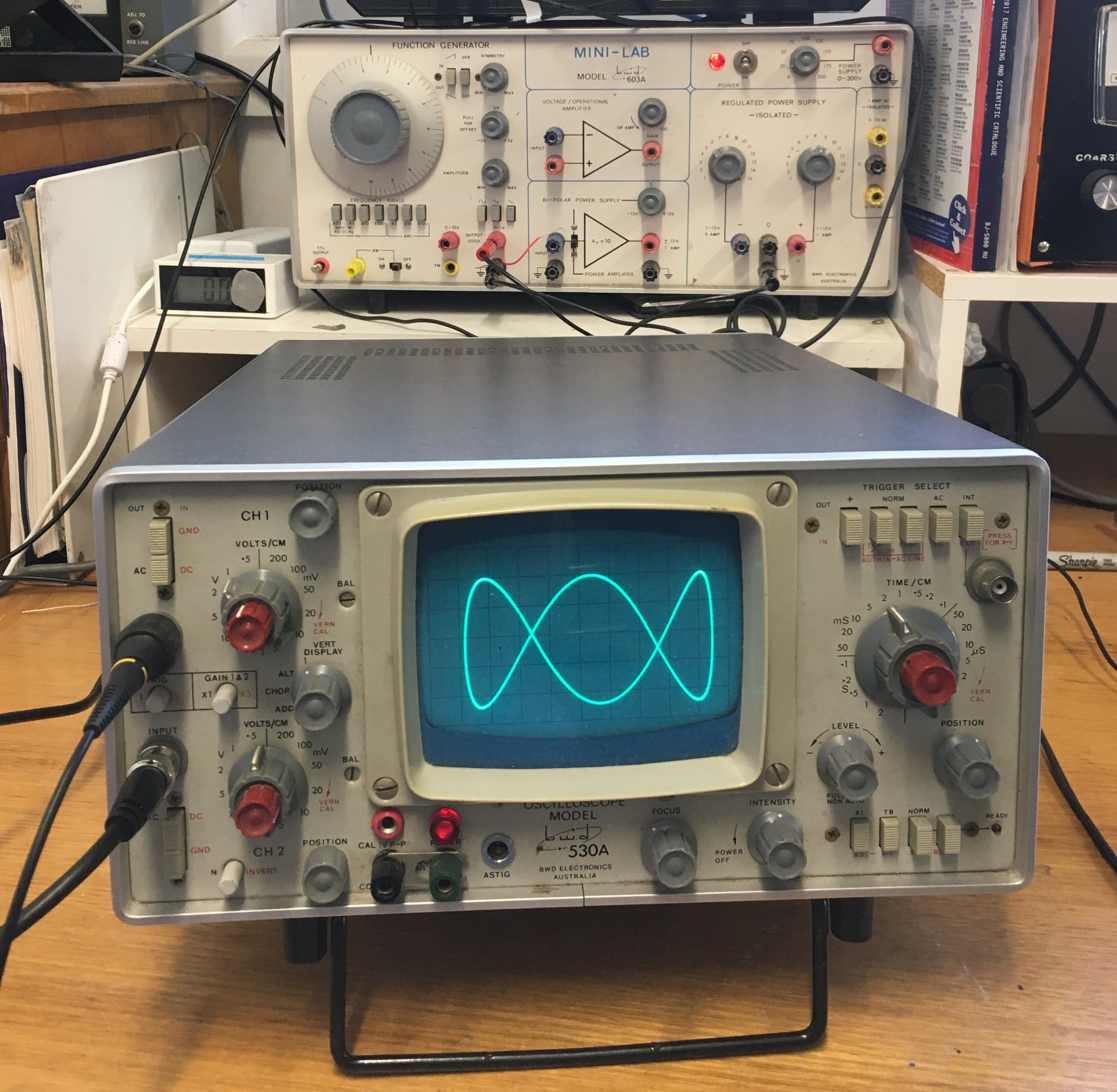
BWD 530A oscilloscope and Mini-Lab 603A. The oscilloscope is displaying a 3:1 Lissajous figure on which the logo of the Australian Broadcasting Corporation is based.

In the years 1960–1980, that Ian Batty termed the "Golden Age of Australian manufacturing", the company prospered and moved in 1966 to new premises at 333 Burke Road, Glen Iris. and subsequently in 1972 to Miles Street in Mulgrave.The company was bought by "McVan Instruments" Mulgrave, Victoria. which changed its name in 2014 to "Observator Instruments Pty Ltd" part of the Observator B.V. group of the Netherlands.

=== Powerscope ===
In 1977 BWD released the 880 Powerscope, (Note: German Patent Application DE19782819751 filed 1978-05-02) an oscilloscope to take measurements on electrical mains circuits. The idea for the Powerscope came to Beesley when he saw an electrically floating Tektronix oscilloscope on a cardboard box being adjusted via a broom handle. His design used four differential amplifiers with high common mode rejection ratio (1:20,000). His patent mentions the use of thick film attenuators on either side of a substrate to achieve accurate temperature tracking. The oscilloscope is designed to accept voltages up to 660Vrms and has a maximum sensitivity of 100 mV/div whilst being able to view voltages at 200 V/div i.e. ± 1000V. The other aspect of the instrument which makes it particularly suitable for power electrical engineering is that it can measure and display phase angles on a digital display. Highlighting reference phase angle markers are provided at 60° intervals. It received an award from the Australian Industrial Design Council some time around 1980.

Beesley left BWD in 1987. In 1989, he returned from retirement to work part time for Cochlear Limited. makers of the Bionic Ear.
