= Bot (surname) =

Bot is a Dutch surname with several origins. Bot as a surname may have separate origins in France and Romania. People with this surname include

- Ben Bot (born 1937), Dutch diplomat, Minister of Foreign Affairs 2003–07
- Călin Ioan Bot (born 1970), Romanian bishop
- Jeanne Bot (1905–2021), French supercentenarian
- Kees de Bot (born 1951), Dutch applied linguist
- Lambertus Johannes Bot (1897–1988), Dutch antimilitarist, anarchist politician
- Lucian Bot (born 1979), Romanian boxer
- Marrie Bot (born 1946), Dutch photographer and graphic designer
- René Bot (born 1978), Dutch football defender
- Theo Bot (1911–1984), Dutch politician, Minister of Education, Culture and Science 1963–65
- Tineke Bot (born 1945), Dutch sculptor
- Yves Bot (1947–2019), French Advocate-General at the European Court of Justice

== See also ==
- Both family, Hungarian aristocratic family, including rulers of Croatia, where they were named "Bot", e.g.:
  - Ivan Bot, Croatian name for Both János (died 1493)
- Both (surname)
- Bott (surname)
- Bolt (surname)
- Boot (surname)
- Bos (surname)
