= Monden =

Monden may refer to:

- Monden Station a railway station on the Aizu Railway Aizu Line in Aizuwakamatsu, Fukushima Prefecture, Japan
- Bruno Monden (1900–1980), German art director
- Christiaan Monden professorial fellow in sociology at Nuffield College, University of Oxford
