= TJB =

TJB may refer to:

- Herb Alpert and the TJB, the band led by Herb Alpert, an American trumpeter
- Tuvalian-Julian boundary, a geological time period associated with the Carnian pluvial episode
- Taejon Broadcasting Corporation, the South Korean regional broadcasting company
- Raja Haji Abdullah Airport, the IATA code TJB
- The Jerusalem Bible, an English translation of the Bible published in 1966
- TJB Botha, a South African shareholder activist
