= Botha =

Botha (pronounced /ˈbʊərtə/ in non-rhotic dialects of English, Afrikaans pronunciation: [ˈbuəta]) is a common Afrikaans surname, derived from the East Frisian Low Saxon Both. It was brought to South Africa in 1678 by Frederich Botha.

The progenitors of the extended clan were Maria Kickers, her first partner Ferdinandùs Appel, and her later husband Frederich Botha.

== Descendants of Ferdinandùs Appel ==
Prior to her marriage to Frederich Botha, Maria Kickers had an out-of-wedlock child fathered by Ferdinandùs Appel, another Hollander from an Amsterdam family. This child, a son named Theunis, was later adopted by the Bothas. His descendants include:

- Louis Botha (1862–1919), Second Boer War general and first Prime Minister of South Africa, often referred to as "General Botha"
- Pieter Willem "P.W." Botha (1916–2006), South African prime minister from 1978 to 1984 and state president from 1984 to 1989

== Descendants of Frederich Botha ==
Married in 1714, Kickers and Botha later farmed for a living between Stellenbosch and Somerset West. By 2016, their legal descendants numbered around 76,125 people, and include:

=== Artists, artisans and businesspeople ===
- Danila Botha (born 1982), South African-born Canadian novelist
- Hannah Botha (1923–2007), South African actress
- Johan Botha (tenor) (1965–2016), opera singer
- Leon Botha (1985–2011), South African artist and progeria victim
- Mike Botha (born 1947), South African-born master diamond cutter
- Piet Botha (1955–2019), South African rock musician
- Roelof Botha (born 1973), South African actuary, former PayPal chief financial officer
- Willem Botha (born 1987), South African singer and actor

=== Politicians, civil servants, and activists ===
- Andries Botha (19th century), Khoikhoi leader in the Cape Colony
- Annie Botha (1864–1937), wife of the Prime Minister of the Union of South Africa
- Chris Botha (1864–1902), head of police and Boer War general, younger brother of Louis Botha
- Cornelius Botha (1932–2014), South African politician
- Philip Botha (1851–1901), Boer War general, older brother of Louis Botha
- Roelof Frederik "Pik" Botha (1932–2018), South African politician and diplomat
- Sandra Botha (born 1945), South African diplomat and ambassador
- Stoffel Botha (1929–1998), South African politician
- Theo Botha (born 1960), South African shareholder activist
- Thozamile Botha (born 1948), South African politician

=== Rugby players ===
- Arno Botha (born 1991), South African rugby player
- Bernado Botha (born 1988), South African rugby player
- Brendon James Botha (born 1980), South African rugby player
- Chrysander Botha (born 1988), Namibian rugby player
- Daniel Botha (born 2001), Australian rugby union player
- Dolph Botha (Philip Rudolph, born 1993), South African rugby player
- Gary Botha (born 1981), South African rugby player
- Hendrik Egnatius "Naas" Botha (born 1958), South African rugby player
- John Philip "Bakkies" Botha (born 1979), South African rugby player
- Mouritz Botha (born 1982), South African rugby player
- Ruan Botha (born 1992), South African rugby player
- Tom Botha (born 1990), South African rugby player

=== Cricketers ===
- Andre Botha (cricketer) (born 1975), South African-born Irish cricketer
- Anthony Greyvensteyn Botha (born 1976), South African cricketer
- Beverly Botha (born 1953), South African female cricketer
- Dawid Botha (born 1988), Namibian cricketer
- Dewald Botha (born 1991), South African cricketer
- Johan Botha (cricketer) (born 1982), South African-born Australian cricketer

=== Other sportspersons ===
- Adriaan Botha (sprinter) (born 1977), South African sprinter
- Andre Botha (bodyboarder) (born 1980), South African bodyboarder
- Bryony Botha (born 1997), New Zealand cyclist
- Francois Botha (born 1968), South African boxer
- Heidi Botha (born 1968), South African fencer
- Johan Botha (athlete) (born 1974), South African middle-distance runner
- Lukas "Luki" Botha (1930–2006), South African Formula One driver
- Riaan Botha (born 1970), South African pole vaulter
- Tyler Botha (born 1980), South African skeleton racer
- Wendy Botha (born 1965), South African-born Australian surfer

== Other uses ==
- Botha, village in the Lundazi district in Eastern Province, Zambia
- 1354 Botha, asteroid
- Anna Elizabeth Botha (née Rossouw, 1922–1997), former South African first lady
- Blackburn Botha, Royal Air Force reconnaissance aircraft
- Botha, Alberta, Canadian settlement in Alberta
- Botha Sigcau (died 1978), former President of Transkei
- Botha's Hill, South African settlement in KwaZulu-Natal
- Botha's lark (Spizocorys fringillaris), a South African lark
- Gunther Botha, South African mercenary in Matthew Reilly's Area 7
- Jaapie Botha, fictional South African Police officer in the film The Power of One
- Karl Botha, fictional counterfeiter from Pepetela's novels
- Louis Botha Avenue, Johannesburg street
- Mutro Botha, assassin in the television series Batman Beyond
- Regiment Botha, South African Army unit
- SATS General Botha, South African warship
- Bothanomics, program of economic reform of the then South African state president Pieter Willem Botha
- Bothasig, northern suburb of Cape Town
- Bothaville, town in the north-west of the Free State
