= Ocean Healing Group =

- Founded: Founded 2007
- Founder: Christiaan Bailey & Frank Bauer
- Number of locations: PO Box 4974 Aspen, CO 81612
- Area served: North America Costa Rica
- Key people: Christiaan Bailey-CEO & Frank Bauer-President
- Website: http://www.OceanHealingGroup.org

Ocean Healing Group (OHG) is an international nonprofit organization that provides once-in-a-lifetime, Costa Rica–based, adaptive sports adventures and quality-of-life programs to children with disabilities.

== History ==
Ocean Healing Group (OHG) was founded in 2007 by Frank Bauer and paralyzed professional surfer Christiaan Bailey.

== JAWS program ==
Their flagship J.A.W.S. (Just Add Water Surfing) program is a Costa Rica–based, adaptive sports adventure program. The J.A.W.S. program is centered on physical rehabilitation through sports and activities such as surfing, snorkeling, zip-line tours, fishing, and quad riding tours and typically runs from seven to 10 days quarterly throughout the year. The program is entirely subsidized for its participant campers and 100 percent of donations received go directly to the facilitation of programs. The JAWS program currently services disabled children with cerebral palsy, spina bifida, spinal cord injury, autism, Ataxia Telangiectasia and other conditions.

== Advocacy ==
In addition to raising money for rehabilitative services for their campers and promoting other like-minded foundations, Ocean Healing Group also engages in public policy advocacy, spinal cord injury peer support mentor-ship as well as being on the cutting edge, in research and development of adaptive surfing equipment. OHG also holds the distinction of being both the first and only international, adaptive surfing program in the world.

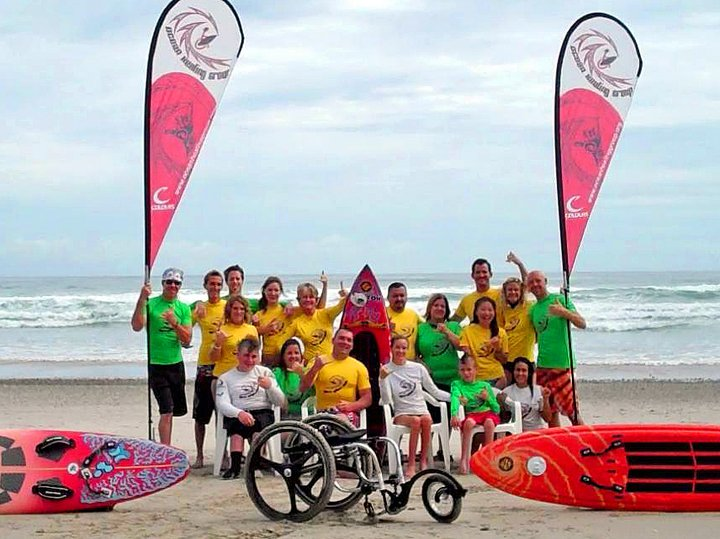

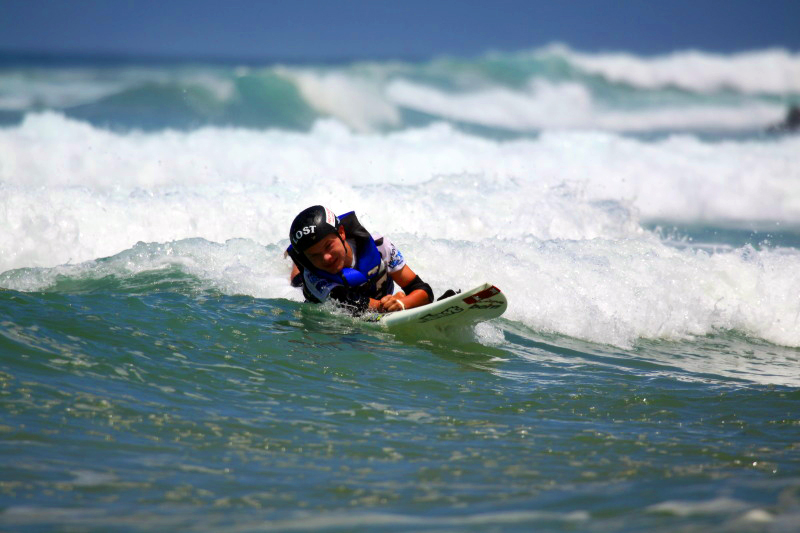

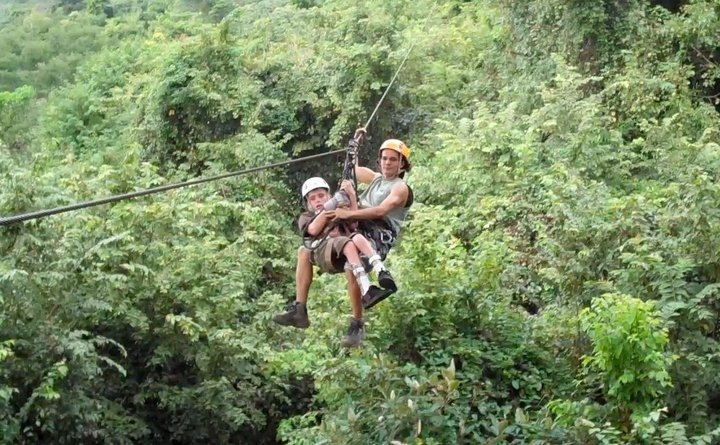

== Leadership ==
Ocean Healing Group is led by a seven-person Board of Directors as well as a 10-person Advisory Committee. Corporate Officers are CEO and Executive Director Christiaan Bailey and Board President Frank Bauer.

=== Accreditation ===
Ocean Healing Group is certified by the Internal Revenue Service as a non-profit 501(c)(3) organization.
