= Barend Bispinck =

Dutch Golden Age painter

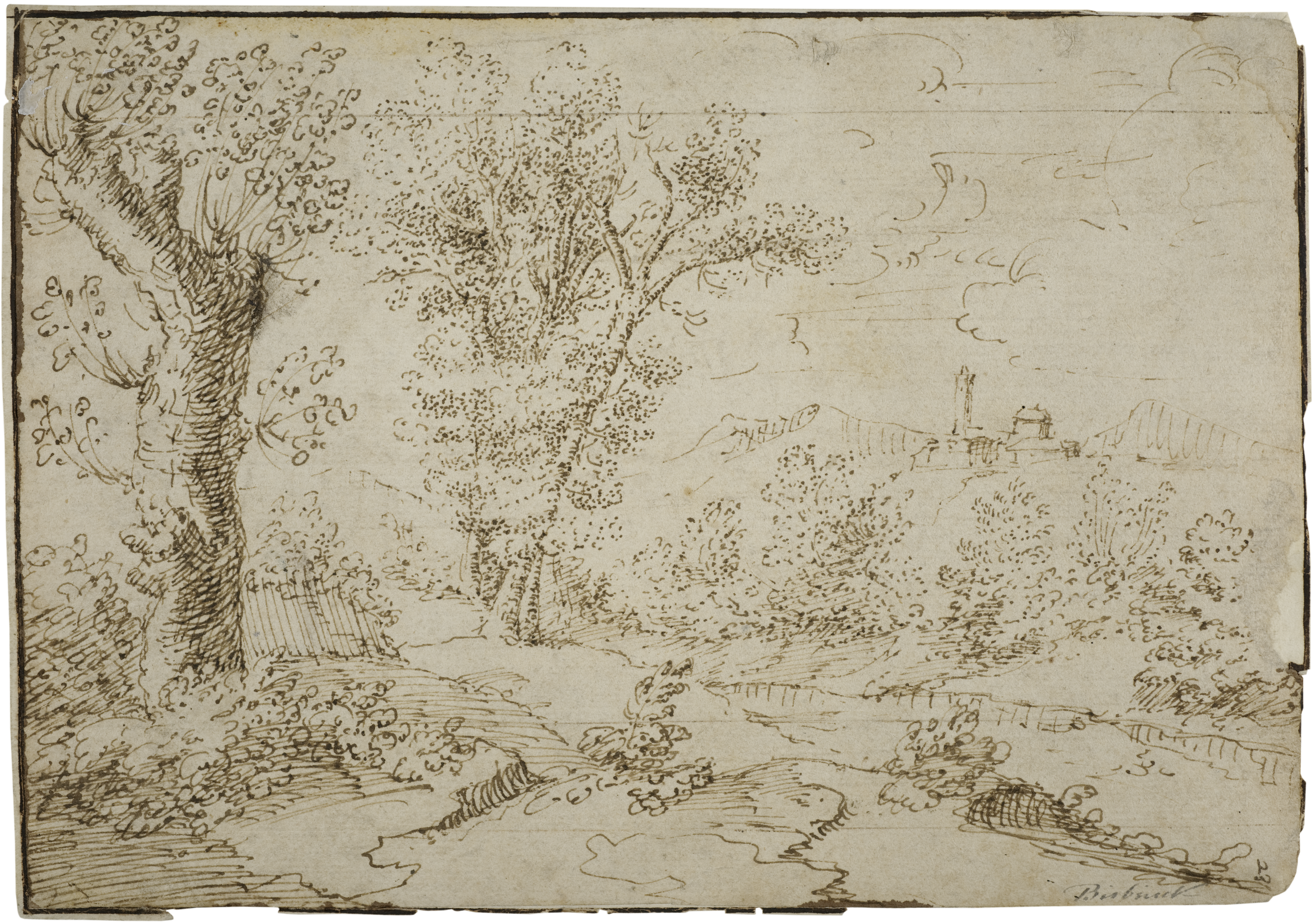

Barend Bispinck (1622 – after 1658) was a Dutch Golden Age landscape painter.

He was born in Dordrecht. According to Houbraken he was a pupil of Jan Both.

According to the RKD (Netherlands Institute for Art History) he was a pupil of Jan Dirksz Both in Utrecht in 1646. Bispinck married Maria van Diemen in Dordrecht on 29 December 1654, but his wife died the next year. He then worked in the Hague and in Hulst in 1658. Nothing more is known of him after 1658.
