= Straight Outta Line =

Single by BOTH
- Released: June 10, 2014 (global) March 10, 2015 (United States)
- Recorded: 2014
- Genre: EDM; Neo soul; House; Funk
- Length: 3:04
- Label: PIAS; Dim Mak
- Songwriter(s): John Turrell; BOTH
- Producer(s): BOTH

BOTH singles chronology
| "BOTH" (2013) | "Straight Outta Line" (2014) | "The Longest of Goodbyes" (2015) |

Music video
- "Straight Outta Line" on YouTube

"Straight Outta Line" is a 2014 single by the Belgian-French electronic music duo BOTH released in Europe on 10 June 2014 by [PIAS] Recordings (Play It Again Sam), then in the United States on 10 March 2015 by Dim Mak Records. The song is revolving around the genres of EDM, Nu Soul, House and Funk. It was written by John Turrell (of Smoove & Turrell) and BOTH and was produced by BOTH.

== Music video ==
The music video was shot by London-based film maker Lucy Tcherniak. The music video tells the story of a couple (played by Johnny Ortiz and Rhian Rees) who successfully cross a fenced Mexico-US border aided by a third person (played by Gabe Nevins), who also helps them in getting established in the new country.

== Track list ==
- PIAS release
1. "Straight Outta Line" (radio edit) – 3:04
2. "Straight Outta Line" (extended mix) – 4:00
3. "Straight Outta Line" (P.A.F.F. Deep remix) – 4:50
- Dim Mak release
1. "Straight Outta Line" – 3:02
- Straight Outta Line (The Remixes)
1. "Straight Outta Line" (Marnik remix) – 3:43
2. "Straight Outta Line" (PeaceTreaty remix) – 4:09
3. "Straight Outta Line" (Sunset Child remix) – 4:36
4. "Straight Outta Line" (Jam Xpress remix) – 4:48
5. "Straight Outta Line" (Fear of Dawn remix) – 4:44
6. "Straight Outta Line" (Fear of Dawn dub) – 4:45

== Charts ==
| Chart (2014) | Peak position |
|---|---|
| Belgium (Ultratip Bubbling Under Flanders) | 44 |
| Belgium (Ultratip Bubbling Under Wallonia) | 4 |
| France (SNEP) | 118 |
| Germany (GfK) | 57 |
| Chart (2015) | Peak position |
| US Dance/Mix Show Airplay (Billboard) | 27 |
