= Bodhe =

Bodhe may refer to:

- Bodhe, Nepal
- Boite mac Cináeda or Bodhe (d. 1058), Scottish prince
