= Andries Both =

Dutch painter (c.1612–1642)

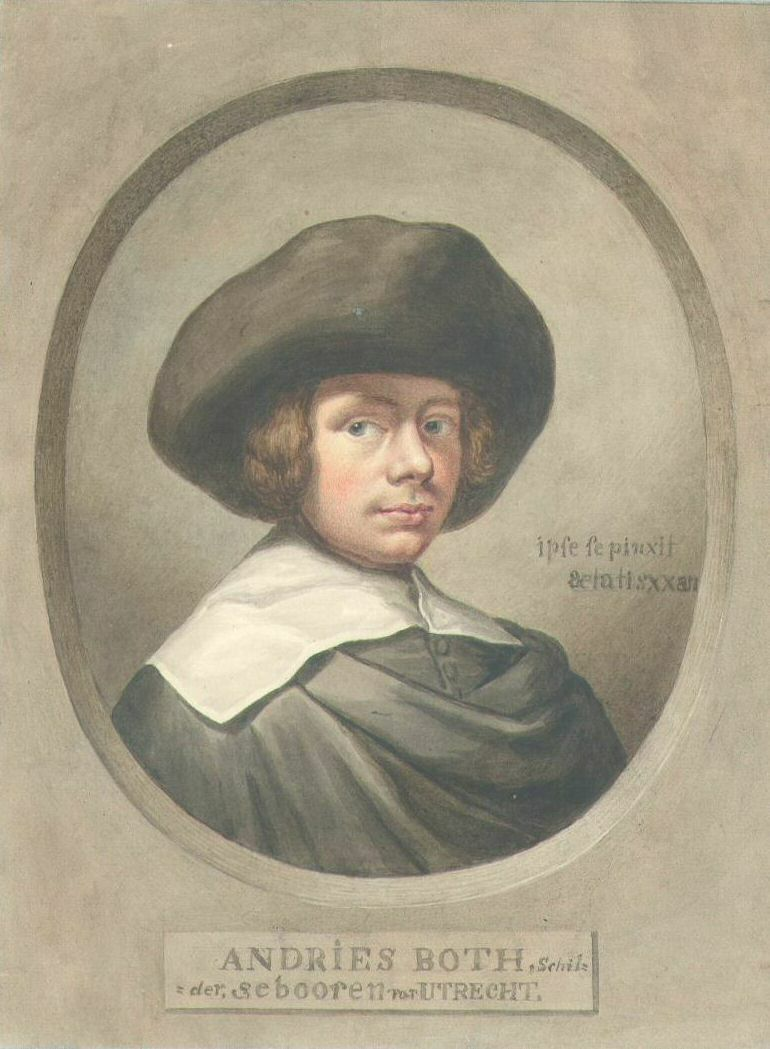
Portrait of Andries Both by Christiaan Kramm

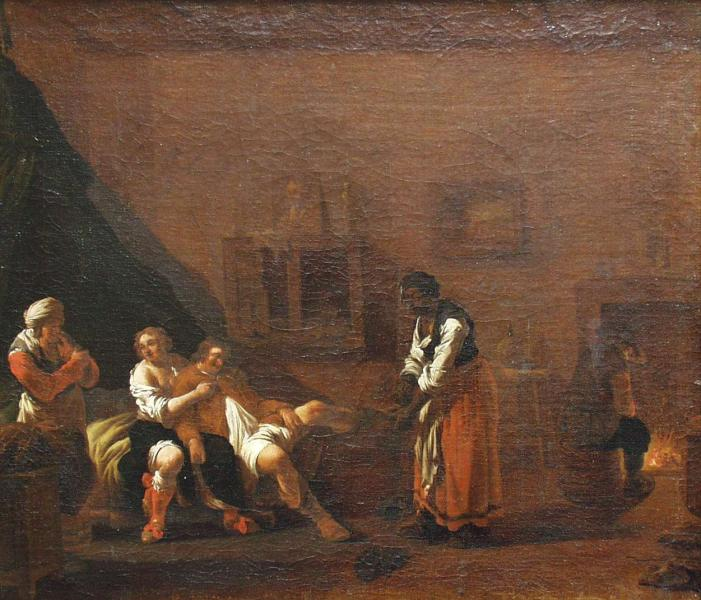
Scene in a Brothel

Andries Both (1612/1613 – 23 March 1642), was a Dutch genre painter. He was part of the group of Dutch and Flemish genre painters active in Rome in the 17th century known as the bamboccianti, who painted scenes from the everyday life of the lower classes in Rome and its countryside.

== Life ==
Both, pronounced [bɔt], was born in Utrecht, the son of a glass painter. He studied under Abraham Bloemaert. His brother Jan was a genre and landscape painter.

Andries resided in Rouen in 1633 and later traveled on to Rome where his presence is documented from 1635 to 1641. He first shared a studio with a fellow painter from Utrecht, Jan van Causteren. In 1638 his brother joined him. The brothers lived on the Via Vittoria in the parish of San Lorenzo in Lucina and both may have joined the Accademia di San Luca and the group of mainly Dutch and Flemish artists active in Rome called the Bentvueghels.

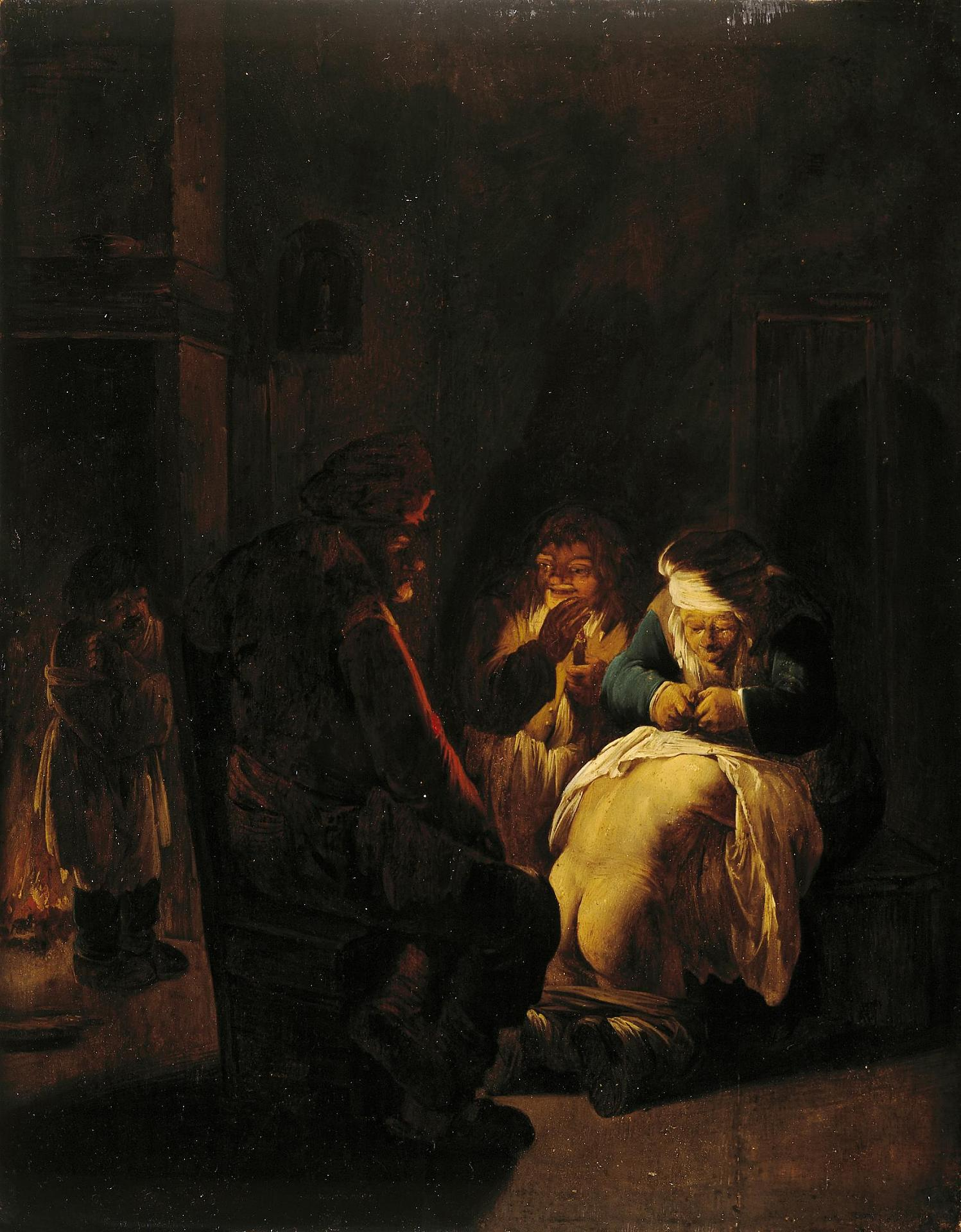
Peasants in an interior

In 1641 the brothers left Rome to travel back to the Netherlands. Andries died in Venice by drowning in a canal as he was returning from some festivities.

== Work ==
His work is noted for its humorous and outrageous quality, mixed with objectivity and harsh reality, depicting the seamier side of Italian life with broad strokes. The style, known as Bambocciata, after the nickname of its originator, the Dutch painter Pieter van Laer, who was known in Rome as il bamboccio,, which means "ugly doll" or "puppet". This was an allusion to van Laer's ungainly appearance, as he is said to have had unusually long legs, short chest and almost no neck.

These Bambocciata works were informed by existing traditions of depicting peasant subjects from 16th-century Netherlandish art. They were generally small cabinet paintings or etchings of the everyday life of the lower classes in Rome and its countryside.

Andries Both's low-life genre paintings were also influenced by the older tradition of Pieter Brueghel the Elder as well as that of the Flemish genre painter Adriaen Brouwer who had worked in the Dutch Republic for an extensive period in the 1620s.

== List of known paintings ==
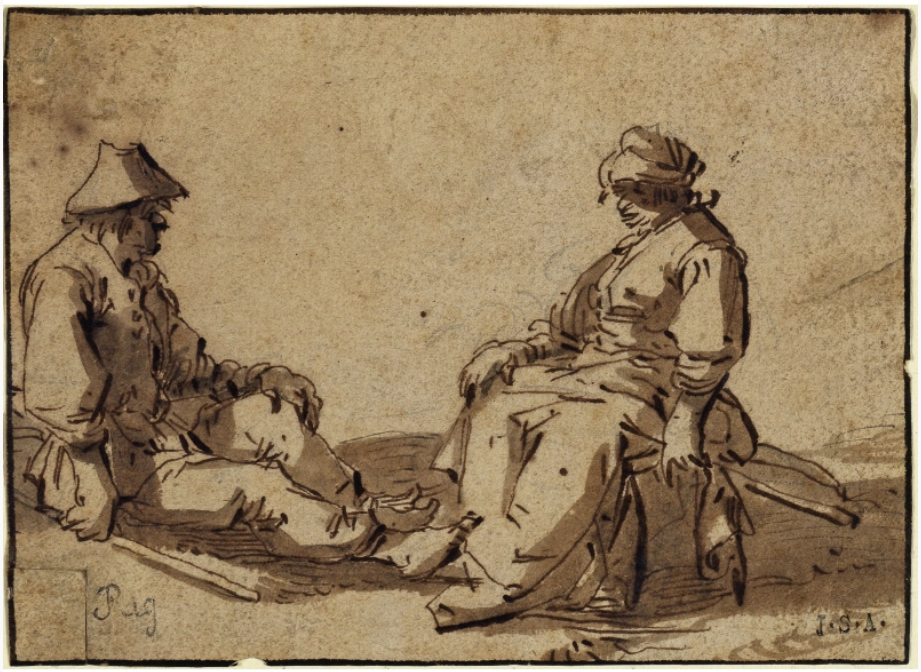
Sitting peasant couple

- Scene in a brothel (Formerly also known as 'the return of the prodigal son'); Canvas, 44 x 51 cm
  - Bredius Museum; Inv.nr. 116–1946, Cat.nr.21
- Travellers by a Well (1635–1641); wood
  - NGV International, The Art Foundation of Victoria; accession no. E3-1980
- Boors Carousing (1634, Utrecht)
- Card Players (Rijksmuseum, Amsterdam)
- Hunting by candlelight (Museum of Fine Arts, Budapest)
