= Christiaan Justus Enschedé =

Dutch newspaper editor and printer

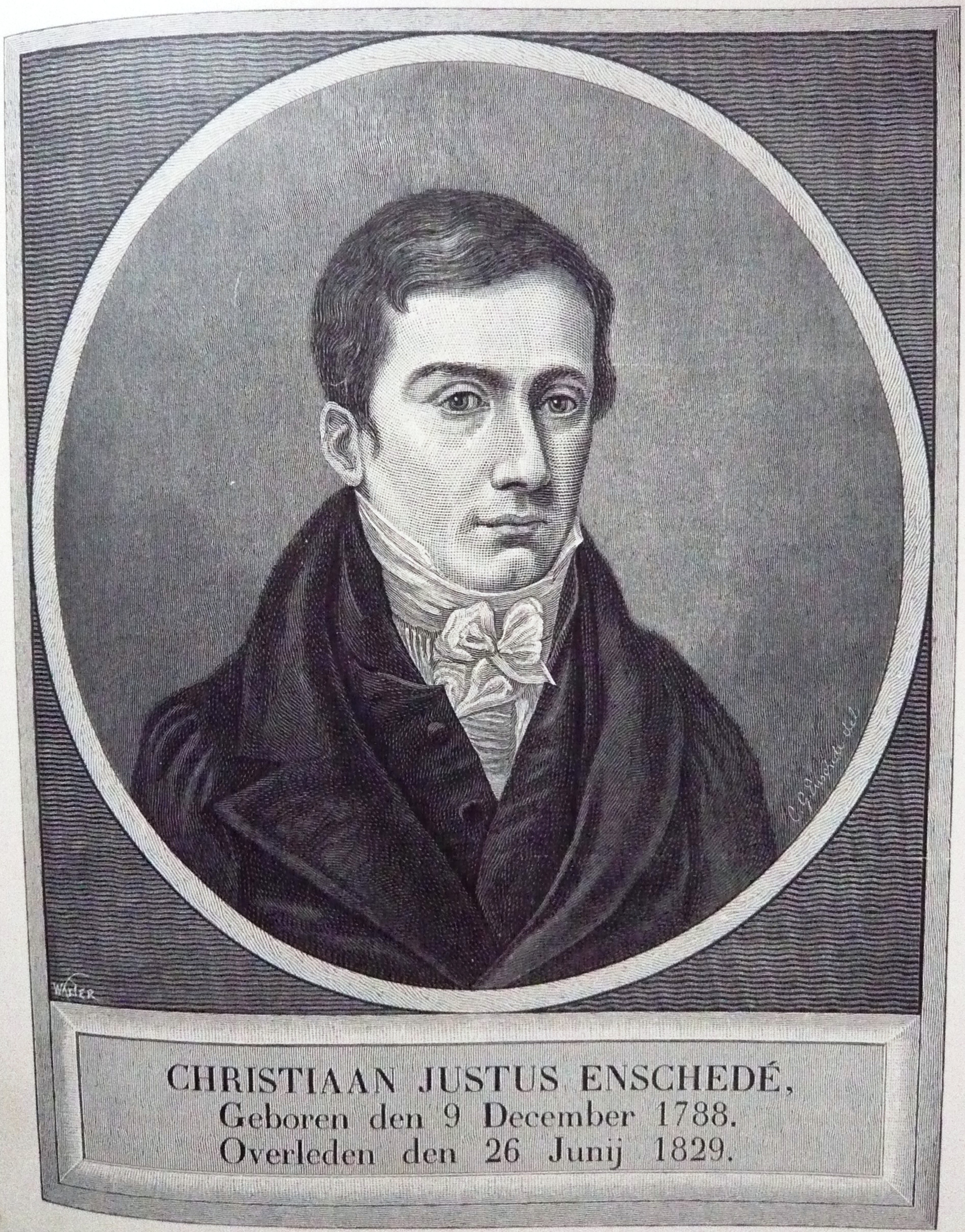
Enschede-portrait of Christiaan Justus Enschedé 1788-1829

Christiaan Justus Enschedé (9 December 1788 in Haarlem – 26 June 1829 in Haarlem) was a Haarlem newspaper editor and printer.

== Biography ==
He was a son of Johannes Enschedé Jr. and Johanna Elisabeth Swaving. For some time he was a partner in the family company. On 9 August 1827 in Rotterdam he married Adriana Maria van Dalen (Rotterdam, 10 May 1801 – Haarlem, 31 January 1858) the daughter of Abraham Cornelis Dalen and Jacoba Catharina Durselen.
