= Christiaan Cicek =

Dutch footballer (born 1988)

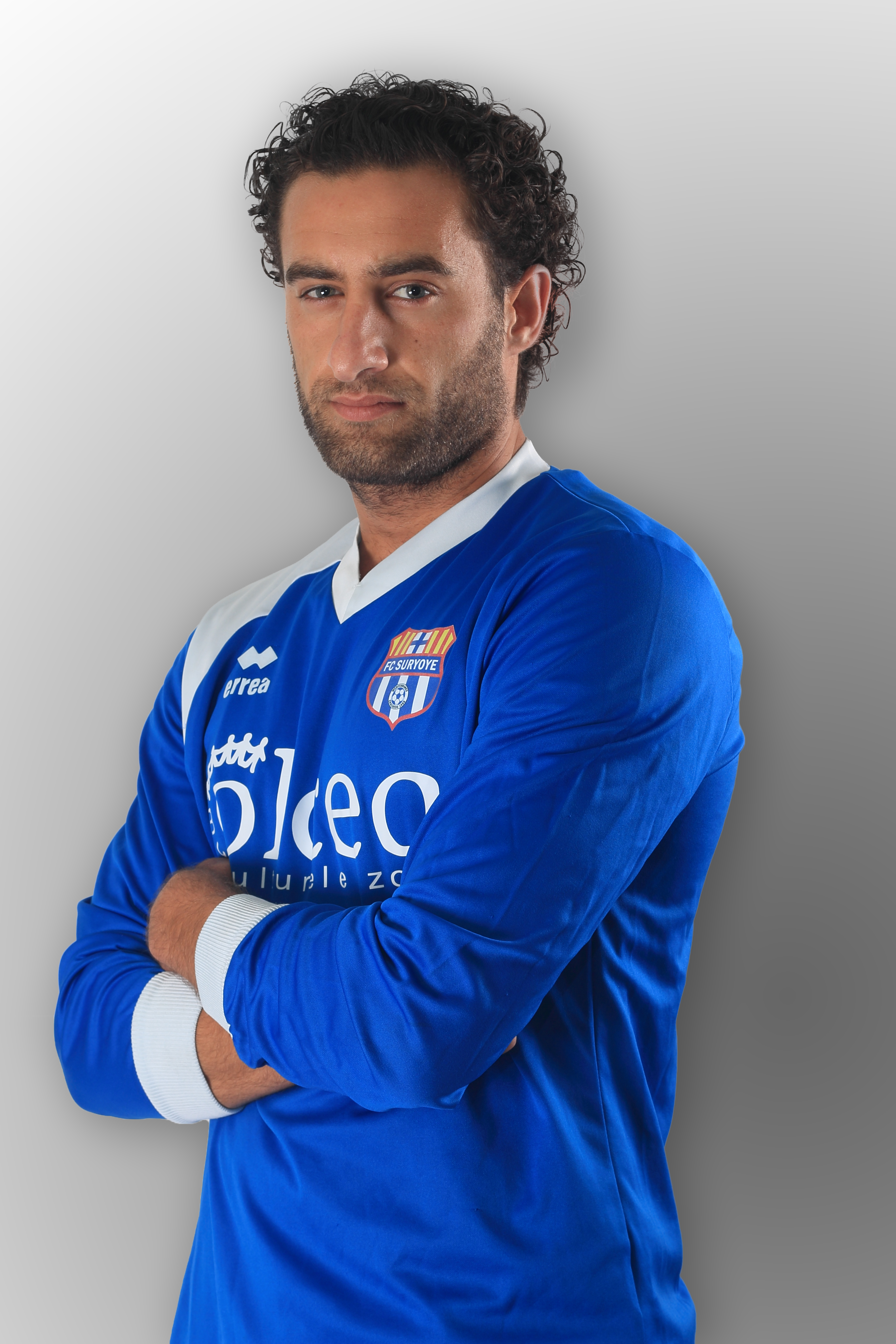

Personal information
- Full name: Christiaan Cicek
- Date of birth: 3 December 1988 (age 37)
- Place of birth: Hengelo, Netherlands
- Position: Striker

Youth career
- Tubantia

Senior career*
Years	Team	Apps	(Gls)
2008–2009	Rigtersbleek		
2009-2010	Quick '20		
2010–2011	FC Lienden		
2011	Excelsior '31		
2011–2013	FC Zwolle	6	(2)
2013–2014	SVZW		
2014–2015	SpVgg Vreden		
2015–2024	FC Suryoye		
- * Club domestic league appearances and goals

Christiaan Cicek (born 3 December 1988) is a Dutch retired footballer of Assyrian descent who played as a striker.

== Club career ==
Cicek joined Topklasse side FC Lienden from Quick '20 in 2010.

Christiaan Cicek's professional debut was on 12 September 2011 for FC Zwolle against Helmond Sport. Before Christiaan Cicek came to PEC Zwolle he did a soccer internship for Syrianska FC. In 2013 he joined SVZW alongside former FC Emmen striker Ruud ter Heide.

In September 2015, he joined Dutch amateur side FC Suryoye-Mediterraneo from German team Spvgg Vreden.
