= Christiaan Bailey =

American professional surfer (born 1981)

Personal information
- Born: March 31, 1981 (age 45) Santa Cruz, California, U.S.
- Years active: 1987 – present
- Height: 6 ft 2 in (1.88 m)
- Weight: 195 lb (88 kg)
- Website: boxwheelchairs.com/christiaan-otter-bailey

Surfing career
- Sport: Surfing
- Sponsors: Roush Creations, Volcom, Electric Sunglasses, Box Wheelchairs, GoPro, Fox Suspension, Bones, Santa Cruz
- Major achievements: ISA Team World Surfing Champion(2018), ISA World Championships Silver medalist (2015,16,17,18) 3 Time USA Surfing National Champion (2009,17,18), 1st paraplegic to surf Pipeline, 1st paraplegic to ride Mavericks, currently the only paralyzed professional big wave surfer in the world.

Surfing specifications
- Stance: Regular (natural) foot
- Shaper: Eric Roush (Surftech/Roush Creations)
- Quiver: 5'10" – 6'6"
- Favorite waves: Hossegor (France), Steamer Lane (Santa Cruz), Killers (Safi, Morocco), Puerto Escondido (Mexico)

Christiaan "Otter" Bailey (born March 31, 1981, Santa Cruz, California), is an American professional surfer, known for his experience as a surf safari guide and skill as a big wave surfer and skateboarder.

== Early life and education ==
Bailey grew up in the Santa Cruz, California area and excelled as a semi-pro surfer and skateboarder. He and his family departed for France when he was young, where he attended the American School of Paris.

== Career ==
Bailey moved back to Santa Cruz in the fall of 2003. He was a professional surfer and skateboarder, who spent much of his time in Central America and west Africa as a back-country surf guide. On July 23, 2006, during the filming of a skateboarding video at Derby skatepark in Santa Cruz, Bailey crashed on his skateboard, fracturing several vertebrae in his back (L3, L4, S3), damaging his spinal cord in the process, which left him paralyzed from the waist down as a result.

In 2007, Bailey and Frank Bauer, started an international nonprofit organization, Ocean Healing Group (OHG), which provides once-in-a-lifetime, Costa Rica–based, adaptive sports adventures and quality-of-life programs to children with disabilities.

=== Accomplishments ===
Since his injury, Bailey's sponsors have continued to support him, giving him the opportunity to surf on tour. He participates in expression sessions on various legs of several different pro and semi-pro tours; including the WSL(World Surf League) WQS/WCT (World Qualifying Series & World Championship Tour), Western Surfing Association tour, National Scholastic Surfing Association tour and Volcom Crustaceous Series events.

Since his injury in July 2006, Bailey has gone on to become Captain of USA Surfing, is a three time USA National Champion (2009,2017,18), 7 time ISA World Adaptive Surfing Championship medalist (2015-Silver, 2016-Silver & Team Silver, 2017 Silver & Team Bronze, 2018 Silver and Team Gold). He has surfed in expression sessions during the O'Neill Coldwater Classic (2006–12,15,16), US Open of Surfing (2007–16), Hurley Pro at Lowers WCT (2008–11,12,14) Reef Panama Classic (2007–08, 2010), Rip Curl Pro Bells Beach (2009,11) Globe WCT Fiji (2010,11) Quicksilver Pro Hossegor (2008–10), NSSA National Championships (2007), WSA National Championships (2008–10) and the Volcom Crustaceous Tour Series (2008–11). Bailey was the first paralyzed person to win the WSA Championships (Trestles 2009), as well as the first paralyzed person to surf "Mavericks" (Half Moon Bay, California). In March 2010, Christiaan Bailey and Aaron Fotheringham were selected by the IPC or International Paralympic Committee to be a part of "Team Extreme" for the Vancouver Paralympic Opening Ceremonies, showcasing the new sport of chairskating at BC Place Stadium in front of 73,000 people. Bailey is currently one of only two professional "chairskaters", and currently remains the only paralyzed professional big wave surfer in the world.

He is also active in many international NGO's and disability related non profit organizations. He is a member of a United Nations medical delegation initiative called "Global Mobility", that provides ambulatory aid equipment, to people with disabilities in developing nations. He works closely with the Challenged Athletes Foundation as a surfing instructor and he is a coach at Ability First Wheelchair Sports Camp.

He currently serves on the board of directors of USA Surfing (Surfing NGB), as well as the Adaptive Surfing advisory board for the International Surfing Association (Surfing IGB).
