= Christiaan Moltzer =

Dutch sports shooter

Personal information
- Born: 12 August 1875 Amsterdam, Netherlands
- Died: 20 September 1945 (aged 70) Amsterdam, Netherlands

Sport
- Sport: Sports shooting

Christiaan Nicolaas Jacob Moltzer (12 August 1875 – 20 September 1945) was a Dutch sports shooter. He competed in two events at the 1920 Summer Olympics.
