= Ida Bothe =

German artist and educator

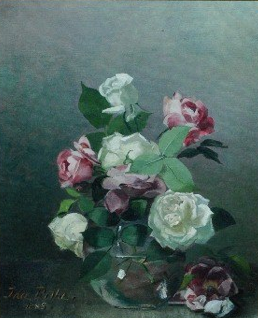
Roses in vase by Ida Bothe (1885)

Ida Bothe was an artist and educator in the 19th century. Born in Germany, Bothe moved to Boston, Massachusetts, ca.1880s. She exhibited work in the Boston Art Club, 1881 (a black-and-white "study head ... as masculine as, or even more so than, anything of a similar kind shown by the sterner sex"); and the National Academy of Design (1884–1885). She established a reputation as a painter ("a new and remarkably vital talent.") Bothe taught art at Wellesley College from 1882 until 1890. In 1890 she married Baron Ehrenfried von Voss and returned to Germany, to "Cunnersdorf, bei Hirschberg, Schlesien."
