= Edward Both =

Australian inventor (1908–1987)

Edward Thomas Both OBE
- Born: Edward Thomas Both; 26 April 1908; Caltowie, South Australia, Australia
- Died: 18 November 1987 (aged 79); Mount Beauty, Victoria, Australia
- Other names: Ted, "E.T."
- Occupation: Inventor
- Known for: Both Cabinet Respirator

Edward Thomas "Ted" Both, OBE (26 April 1908 – 18 November 1987) was an Australian inventor credited with the development of a number of medical, military, and general-purpose inventions. He was assisted by his brother, Donald Both, and together the brothers ran their company Both Equipment Limited, located in Adelaide, South Australia. These included a low-cost "iron lung" which was dubbed the Both Cabinet Respirator, a humidicrib, the first portable electrocardiograph and the "visitel" – a forerunner to the modern fax machine. His inventions gained him an OBE in 1940, and his work led to Both being given the moniker "Edison of Australia".

== Early life and education ==
The son of James Alexander Both (1869-1952), known as "Alex", and Lucy Victoria Both (1875-1953), née Thomas, Edward Thomas Both was born at Caltowie, (near Jamestown) in South Australia, on 26 April 1908. His parents had five children, of which Edward (known as "Ted") was the eldest, and his brother, Donald James Ross Both (1914-2005), known as "Don", their third son, was the youngest of the five children.

Both was schooled in the local area, attending Caltowie Public and Jamestown High schools, and proved to be a good student, sufficiently so that when he was sixteen Both began studying at the Physics Department at the University of Adelaide. There he caught the attention of Kerr Grant, a physics professor, who subsequently appointed him as his personal assistant.

In 1932 an electrocardiograph (ECG) developed by Both impressed Grant, and as a result Grant had a facility installed next to the university where Both could design and produce medical equipment.

== Both Equipment Limited ==
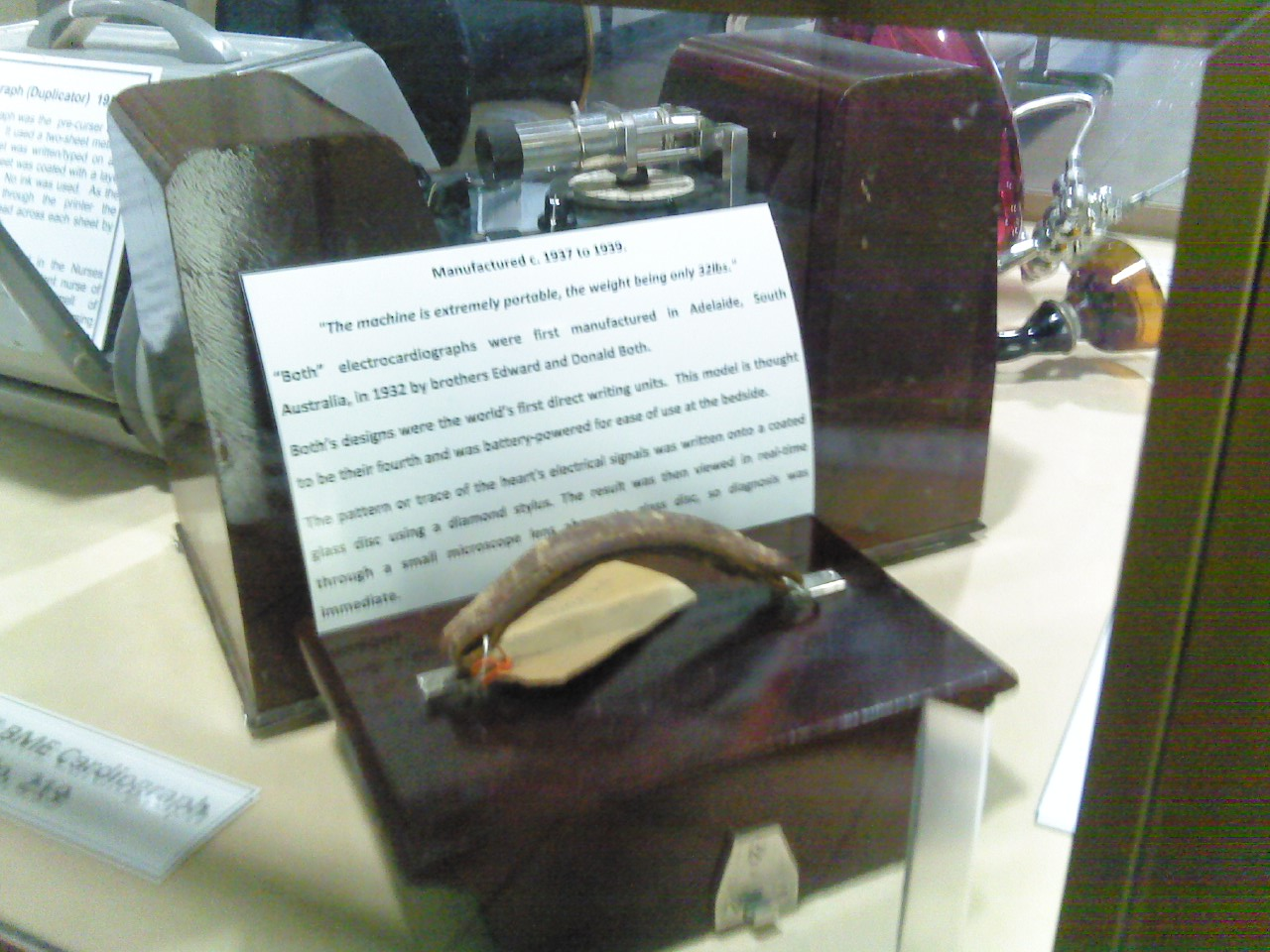
Both portable ECG

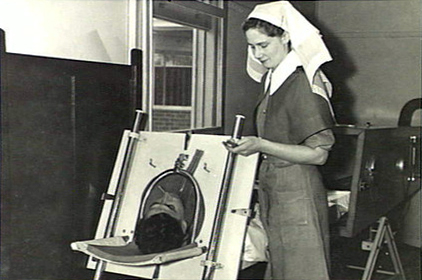
A Both Cabinet Respirator being used to treat a patient at the 110th Australian Military Hospital in 1943

The Both brothers' instruments and appliances were manufactured in the workshop of their company, Both Equipment Limited. It was first located behind the South Australian Museum, at the western end of the old Armoury and Mounted Police Barracks. The factory then moved to Tavistock Street (now Frome Street), and later to King William Street in Kent Town. It was later demolished.

Both's cardiograph was an improvement on previous examples because it showed the heart's action instantly. Working with his brother Donald, Both spent the next four years meeting orders for their electrocardiograph. For many years their products were the only commercially available direct-wiring models, and the ECGs they produced provided very accurate readings.

An outbreak of poliomyelitis (polio) in Australia during 1937 saw a need for Negative pressure ventilators ("iron lungs") to help those stricken with the disease. However, there were only a few such devices in Australia, and the US-built iron lungs were both expensive to purchase and hard to maintain. Thus the company was approached to develop an alternative. The result was the Both Cabinet Respirator: a lightweight, comparatively inexpensive respirator made out of plywood (the name "iron lung" continued to be used by many, in spite of the wooden construction). The design proved effective, and the respirators were soon employed throughout Australia. Indeed, even as recently as 2003 there were several Both respirators still being used in private residences.

In 1938 Both was in England to sell his ECG machines when he heard a request over BBC Radio for an iron lung to assist an individual suffering from poliomyelitis. With the assistance of the South Australian Agent-General, Both set up shop in a hired workshop and produced a few of his "cabinets", one of which was featured in a film produced by the Nuffield Department of Anaesthetics at Radcliffe Infirmary. The film was viewed by William Morris (Lord Nuffield), who was inspired to construct the devices at his Morris Motors Limited factory and offer them, free of charge, to any hospital in the Commonwealth that requested one. In the years that preceded World War II, approximately 1800 Both-Nuffield respirators were supplied to hospitals around the world.

A request for information from America about Both's respirator was sent because of the lower cost of the device to fight poliomyelitis. Both arranged for an American company, K.N.Y Scheerer Corporation to produce the respirator in America.

On his return from England Both created an ultracentrifuge for isolating very fine viruses. It was the first of its kind in Australia and could be used on the polio virus.

=== World War II ===
During the war years Both continued to invent devices, often for the military. The electro-micrometer and electro-crack detector that he developed were designed to inspect the inside of gun-barrels for flaws, and he was involved in work to develop guided torpedoes. Other war time inventions included a three-wheeled electric van for use during petrol rationing that employed a new type of transmission and could turn on the spot, additional medical equipment, (including a portable cardiograph that became standard military equipment during World War II), and the "Visitel" – a device that could transmit drawings over long distances. The visitel was deemed a secret project by the military, and because of the secrecy surrounding it the device was still unused by the end of the war. By 1950 it had been installed at Randwick Racecourse to expedite totalisator operation.

As a diversion during the war Both designed a Punch and Judy machine that showed Hitler being hit with an umbrella by Chamberlain whenever a coin was put in the slot. The money raised by the machine went to charity.

=== Post-war ===
With the war over Both, now based in Sydney, continued to invent. With his brother he continued to work in medical equipment, developing a humidicrib, a new concept in design for blood transfusion equipment, and an electro-encephalograph. The electro-encephalograph designed and manufactured by Both Equipment Limited was used as an aid to the diagnosis of nervous disorders through its recording of the electrical activity of the brain.

They contracted with CSIRO Wool Textile Research Laboratories (W.T.R.L.) in Geelong to supply four pen recorders. Both had early demonstrated a revolutionary recorder for their electrocardiograph (ECG — see above) which employed a diamond stylus leaving a track on a glass plate, but these may have been the more conventional ink-and-paper variety. BWD Electronics were supplying suitable amplifiers concurrently.

Both also worked in other fields: amongst his post-war projects were the electric scoreboards for the 1952 Davis Cup and the 1956 Summer Olympics in Melbourne. The Olympic scoreboard was made up of 10,000 light bulbs and could show all of the letters of the alphabet along with numerals. Along with the scoreboards two versions of a pen recorder were developed and produced by Both: one was used at Woomera for weapons research and the other was used for Antarctic Research, CSIRO, universities, hospitals and medical and industrial research.

In 1953 Donald Both submitted a design for the humidicrib to the Queen's Coronation Gift Committee and it was accepted as a gift on behalf of the people of South Australia.

== Recognition and honours ==
Both was given the moniker "Edison of Australia", and was considered to be the "foremost among designers of intricate tools of the medical trade in South Australia".

In 1940 Edward Both was awarded Order of the British Empire (OBE).

== Personal life ==
Both married Lily Eileen Maud Naughton, at Essendon, Victoria on 16 September 1937. Throughout his life Both enjoyed sports, especially swimming and tennis, although he had a reputation for possessing an "exhausting capacity for work".

== Death and legacy ==
Edward Both died at the age of 79 on 18 November 1987 while at Mount Beauty in Victoria.

The South Australian Museum holds a Both respirator in its store in Netley.

== See also ==
- Both respirator – Negative pressure respiration device
- Electrocardiography – Examination of the heart's electrical activity
- Electroencephalography – Electrophysiological monitoring method to record electrical activity of the brain
- Neonatal intensive care unit incubator (Humidicrib) – Intensive care unit specializing in the care of ill or premature newborn infants
- Iron lung – Negative-pressure mechanically functioning respirator
- Pen recorder – monitor and document variables like temperature, pressure, or humidity, providing a continuous visual record to ensure conditions meet specifications.
