= Bothanomics =

The term Bothanomics refers to the economic reform program announced by then-State President of South Africa P.W. Botha during his opening address on February 5, 1988, to the Parliament of South Africa in Cape Town.

The solutions proposed to the severe economic crisis that afflicted South Africa in the late 1980s included the following:

- the establishment of value-added tax to replace the general sales tax;
- the centralization of public finance;
- the privatization of state-owned companies such as the Electricity Supply Commission (Eskom), South African Transport Services (SAVD), Pos en Telekommunikasie (P&T), the steel manufacturer Iron and Steel Corporation (Yskor), and several roads;
- more efficient management of government finances, reduction in government spending, and the repayment of government debt (using the income from privatization sales);
- the promotion and development of infrastructure projects and institutions, and small businesses in developing areas;
- deregulation in favor of black businessmen;
- freezing public service wages and salaries to fight inflation; and
- savings in social welfare spending and a reduction in the standard of certain public services.

== Sources ==
- "Botha Announces Privatisation Programme." SWB/ME/W0013/A2/2-4, 16 February 1988
- "Botha's New Economic Plan." Front File. Southern African Brief, vol. 2/3 (February 1988)
- Monroe, Richard: "Bothanomics: Sign of SA capitalism's bankruptcy." Inqaba ya basebenzi, No. 26. Available online at www.disa.nu.ac.za.
- Weimer, Bernhard: Das Ende der weißen Vorherrschaft im südlichen Afrika. Baden-Baden: Nomos, 1992.
