= Oscilloscope types =

This is a subdivision of the Oscilloscope article, discussing the various types and models of oscilloscopes in greater detail.

== Digital oscilloscopes ==
While analog devices make use of continually varying voltages, digital devices employ binary numbers which correspond to samples of the voltage. In the case of digital oscilloscopes, an analog-to-digital converter (ADC) is used to change the measured voltages into digital information. Waveforms are taken as a series of samples. The samples are stored, accumulating until enough are taken in order to describe the waveform, which are then reassembled for display. Digital technology allows the information to be displayed with brightness, clarity, and stability. There are, however, limitations as with the performance of any oscilloscope. The highest frequency at which the oscilloscope can operate is determined by the analog bandwidth of the front-end components of the instrument and the sampling rate.

Digital oscilloscopes can be classified into two primary categories: digital storage oscilloscopes and digital sampling oscilloscopes. Newer variants include PC-based oscilloscopes (which attach to a PC for data processing and display) and mixed-signal oscilloscopes (which employ other functions in addition to voltage measurement).

=== Digital storage oscilloscope ===
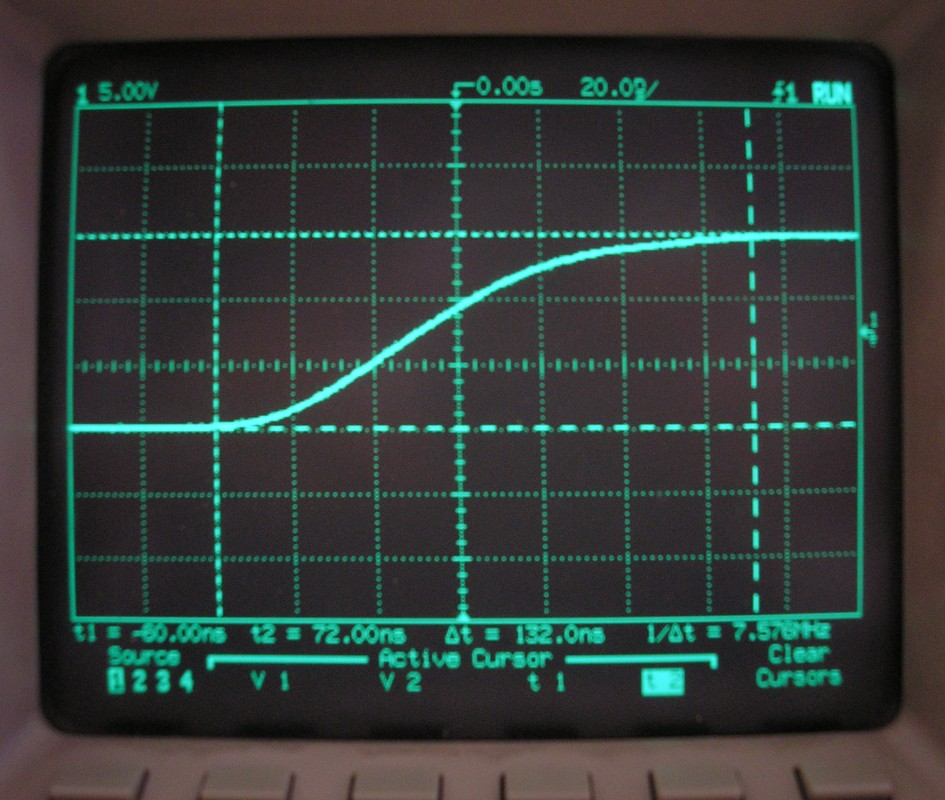
Screen of a digital oscilloscope from HP that uses a cathode-ray tube display

The digital storage oscilloscope, or DSO for short, is now the preferred type for most industrial applications. Instead of storage-type cathode ray tubes, DSOs use digital memory, which can store data as long as required without degradation. A digital storage oscilloscope also allows complex processing of the signal by high-speed digital signal processing circuits.

The vertical input is digitized by an analog-to-digital converter to create a data set that is stored in the memory of a microprocessor. The data set is processed and then sent to the display, which in early DSOs was a cathode ray tube, but today is an LCD flat panel. DSOs with color LCDs are common. The sampling data set can be stored to internal or removable storage or sent over a LAN or USB for processing or archiving. A screen image can also be saved to internal or removable storage, or sent to a built-in or externally connected printer, without the need for an oscilloscope camera. The oscilloscope's own signal analysis software can extract many useful time-domain features (e.g., rise time, pulse width, amplitude), frequency spectra, histograms and statistics, persistence maps, and a large number of parameters meaningful to engineers in specialized fields such as telecommunications, disk drive analysis and power electronics..

Digital oscilloscopes are limited principally by the performance of the analog input circuitry, the duration of the sample window, and resolution of the sample rate. When not using equivalent-time sampling, the sampling frequency should be higher than the Nyquist rate which is double the frequency of the highest-frequency component of the observed signal, otherwise aliasing occurs.

Advantages over the analog oscilloscope are:

- Brighter and bigger display with color to distinguish multiple traces
- Simple one-shot acquisitions into memory without the issues that come with storage-type CRTs
- Much more versatile triggers
- No hiding of noise in the phosphor gloom as it happens on analog oscilloscopes
- The input signal is not just converted into a line on the screen, it is available as sample data which can be stored or further processed (i.e. through measurements and analysis tools that come with the oscilloscope)
- Averaging across consecutive samples or scans as well as specific HiRes modes which work through oversampling can lead to higher vertical resolution
- Versatile measurement and analysis functions make it easy to gather all relevant signal properties
- Peak detection to find specific events at long timebase settings on digital oscilloscopes with small memory (less relevant as newer oscilloscopes now come with large memories that keep the sample rate sufficiently high even at very long timebase settings)
- Easy pan and zoom
- Remote control via USB, Ethernet or GPIB

A disadvantage of older digital oscilloscopes is the limited waveform update rate (trigger rate) compared to their analog predecessors, which can make it difficult to spot "glitches" or other rare phenomena with digital oscilloscopes, especially older ones that have no persistence mode. However, thanks to improvements in waveform processing, newer digital oscilloscopes can reach trigger rates in excess of 1 million updates/second, which is more than the roughly 600,000 triggers/sec the best analog oscilloscopes were able to do. Newer digital oscilloscopes also come with analog persistence modes, which replicate the afterglow of an analog oscilloscope's phosphor CRT.

=== Digital sampling oscilloscopes ===
Digital sampling oscilloscopes operate on the same principle as analog sampling oscilloscopes and, like their analog counterparts, are of great use when analyzing high-frequency signals; that is, repetitive signals whose frequencies are higher than the oscilloscope's sampling rate. For measuring repetitive signals, this type once used to offer bandwidth and high-speed timing up to ten times greater than any real-time oscilloscope.

A real-time oscilloscope, which also used to be called a “single-shot” scope, captures an entire waveform on each trigger event. This requires the scope to capture a large number of data points in one continuous record. A sequential equivalent-time sampling oscilloscope, sometimes simply called a “sampling scope,” measures the input signal only once per trigger. The next time the scope is triggered, a small delay is added and another sample is taken. Thus a large number of trigger events must occur in order to collect enough samples to build a picture of the waveform. The measurement bandwidth is determined by the frequency response of the sampler which currently can extend beyond 90 GHz.

An alternative to sequential equivalent-time sampling is called random equivalent-time sampling. Samples are synchronised not with trigger events but with the scope's internal sampling clock. This causes them to occur at apparently random times relative to the trigger event. The scope measures the time interval between the trigger and each sample, and uses this to locate the sample correctly on the x-axis. This process continues until enough samples have been collected to build up a picture of the waveform. The advantage of this technique over sequential equivalent-time sampling is that the scope can collect data from before the trigger event as well as after it, in a similar way to the pre-trigger function of most real-time digital storage scopes. Random equivalent-time sampling can be integrated into a standard DSO without requiring special sampling hardware, but has the disadvantage of poorer timing precision than the sequential sampling method.

However, due to the progress in ADC technology which has led to real-time oscilloscopes with bandwidths over 100 GHz, the demand for digital sampling oscilloscopes has been shrinking, as has the need for integrating equivalent time sampling in real-time oscilloscopes.

=== Handheld oscilloscopes ===
Handheld oscilloscopes are useful for many test and field service applications. Today, a hand-held oscilloscope is usually a real-time oscilloscope, using a monochrome or color LCD. Typically, a hand-held oscilloscope has one or two analog input channels, but four-input-channel versions are also available. Some instruments combine the functions of a digital multimeter with the oscilloscope. These usually are lightweight and have good accuracy.

=== PC-based oscilloscopes ===
A PC-based oscilloscope is a type of digital oscilloscope which relies on a standard PC platform for waveform display and instrument control. In general, there are two types of PC-based oscilloscopes

- Standalone oscilloscopes which contain an internal PC platform (PC mainboard) – common with upper mid-range and high-end oscilloscopes
- External oscilloscopes which connect via USB or Ethernet to a separate PC (desktop or laptop)

At the end of the 1990s, Nicolet and HP introduced the first standalone PC-based oscilloscopes, where the "oscilloscope" part consisted of a specialized signal acquisition system, consisting of an electrical interface providing isolation and automatic gain controls, high-speed analog-to-digital converters, sample memory and on-board Digital Signal Processor (DSPs). The PC part ran Microsoft Windows as the operating system with an oscilloscope application on top, which displayed the waveform data and was used to control the instrument.

Since then, the high-end lines of standalone oscilloscopes of all four major oscilloscope manufacturers (HP/Agilent/Keysight, LeCroy, Tektronix, Rohde & Schwarz) have been based on a PC platform.

The other group of PC-based oscilloscopes are the external oscilloscopes, i.e. where the acquisition system is physically separate from the PC platform. Depending on the exact hardware configuration of the external oscilloscope, the hardware also could be described as a digitizer, a data logger or as a part of a specialized automatic control system. The separate PC provides the display, control interface, disc storage, networking and often the electrical power for the acquisition hardware. The external oscilloscope can transfer data to the computer in two main ways – streaming and block mode. In streaming mode the data is transferred to the PC in a continuous flow without any loss of data. The way in which the PCO is connected to the PC (e.g. Ethernet, USB etc.) will dictate the maximum achievable speed and thereby frequency and resolution using this method. Block mode utilizes the on-board memory of the external oscilloscope to collect a block of data which is then transferred to the PC after the block has been recorded. The acquisition hardware then resets and records another block of data. This process happens very quickly, but the time taken will vary according to the size of the block of data and the speed at which it can be transferred. This method enables a much higher sampling speed, but in many cases the hardware will not record data whilst it is transferring the existing block.

The advantages of a standalone PC-based oscilloscopes include:

- Easy exporting of data to standard PC software such as spreadsheets and word processors which can run on the oscilloscope
- Ability to run analysis tools like numerical analysis software and or signal analysis software directly on the oscilloscope
- Ability to run automation software to perform automatic tests
- Ability to easily control the oscilloscope from a remote location via networking

The advantages of external oscilloscopes are the same as for standalone PC-based oscilloscopes, plus in addition:

- Costs are often lower than for a comparable stand-alone oscilloscope, especially if the user already owns a suitable PC or laptop
- Standalone PCs and laptops typically have large high-resolution color displays which can be easier to read than the smaller displays found on conventional oscilloscopes.
- Portability when used with a laptop PC
- Some external oscilloscopes are much smaller physically than even handheld oscilloscopes

However, PC-based oscilloscopes, standalone or external, also have some disadvantages, which include:

- Power-supply and electromagnetic noise from PC circuits, which requires careful and extensive shielding to obtain good low-level signal resolution
- For external oscilloscopes, the need for the owner to install oscilloscope software on the PC, which may not be compatible with the current release of the PC operating system
- Time for the PC platform to boot, compared with the almost instant start-up of a standalone oscilloscope based on an embedded platform (although every oscilloscope will require a warm-up period to reach specification compliance so this should rarely be an issue)

=== Mixed-signal oscilloscopes ===
A mixed-signal oscilloscope (MSO) combines all the measurement capabilities and the use model of a Digital Storage Oscilloscope with some of the measurement capabilities of a logic analyzer. Analog and digital signals are acquired with a single time base, they are viewed on a single display, and any combination of these signals can be used to trigger the oscilloscope.

MSOs typically lack the advanced digital measurement capabilities and the large number of digital acquisition channels of standalone logic analyzers. Typical mixed-signal measurement uses include the characterization and debugging of hybrid analog/digital circuits like for example embedded systems, Analog-to-digital converters (ADCs), Digital-to-analog converters (DACs), and control systems.

== Cathode-ray oscilloscope ==
The earliest and simplest type of oscilloscope consisted of a cathode ray tube, a vertical amplifier, a timebase, a horizontal amplifier and a power supply. These are now called "analog" oscilloscopes to distinguish them from the "digital" oscilloscopes that became common in the 1990s and 2000s.

Before the introduction of the CRO in its current form, the cathode ray tube had already been in use as a measuring device. The cathode ray tube is an evacuated glass envelope, similar to that in a black-and-white television set, with its flat face covered in a fluorescent material (the phosphor). The screen is typically less than 20 cm in diameter, much smaller than the one in a television set. Older CROs had round screens or faceplates, while newer CRTs in better CROs have rectangular faceplates.

In the neck of the tube is an electron gun, which is a small heated metal cylinder with a flat end coated with electron-emitting oxides. Close to it is a much-larger-diameter cylinder carrying a disc at its cathode end with a round hole in it; it's called a "grid" (G1), by historic analogy with amplifier vacuum-tube grids. A small negative grid potential (referred to the cathode) is used to block electrons from passing through the hole when the electron beam needs to be turned off, as during sweep retrace or when no trigger events occur.

However, when G1 becomes less negative with respect to the cathode, another cylindrical electrode designated G2, which is hundreds of volts positive referred to the cathode, attracts electrons through the hole. Their trajectories converge as they pass through the hole, creating quite-small diameter "pinch" called the crossover. Following electrodes ("grids"), electrostatic lenses, focus this crossover onto the screen; the spot is an image of the crossover.

Typically, the CRT runs at roughly -2 kV or so, and various methods are used to correspondingly offset the G1 voltage. Proceeding along the electron gun, the beam passes through the imaging lenses and first anode, emerging with an energy in electron-volts equal to that of the cathode. The beam passes through one set of deflection plates, then the other, where it is deflected as required to the phosphor screen.

The average voltage of the deflection plates is relatively close to ground, because they have to be directly connected to the vertical output stage.

By itself, once the beam leaves the deflection region, it can produce a usefully bright trace. However, for higher bandwidth CROs where the trace may move more rapidly across the phosphor screen, a positive post-deflection acceleration ("PDA") voltage of over 10,000 volts is often used, increasing the energy (speed) of the electrons that strike the phosphor. The kinetic energy of the electrons is converted by the phosphor into visible light at the point of impact.

When switched on, a CRT normally displays a single bright dot in the center of the screen, but the dot can be moved about electrostatically or magnetically. The CRT in an oscilloscope always uses electrostatic deflection. Ordinary electrostatic deflection plates can typically move the beam roughly only 15 degrees or so off-axis, which means that oscilloscope CRTs have long, narrow funnels, and for their screen size, are usually quite long. It's the CRT length that makes CROs "deep", from front to back. Modern flat-panel oscilloscopes have no need for such rather-extreme dimensions; their shapes tend to be more like one kind of rectangular lunchbox.

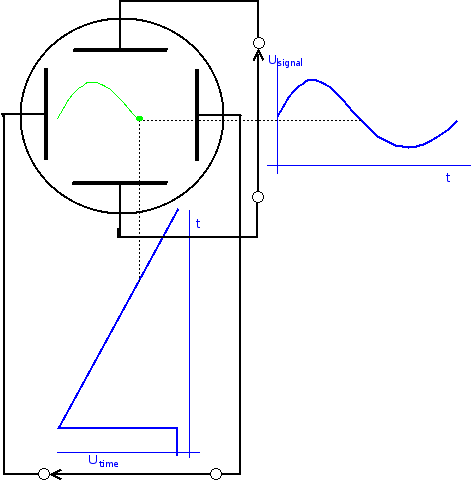

Between the electron gun and the screen are two opposed pairs of metal plates called the deflection plates. The vertical amplifier generates a potential difference across one pair of plates, giving rise to a vertical electric field through which the electron beam passes. When the plate potentials are the same, the beam is not deflected. When the top plate is positive with respect to the bottom plate, the beam is deflected upwards; when the field is reversed, the beam is deflected downwards. The horizontal amplifier does a similar job with the other pair of deflection plates, causing the beam to move left or right. This deflection system is called electrostatic deflection, and is different from the electromagnetic deflection system used in television tubes. In comparison to magnetic deflection, electrostatic deflection can more readily follow random and fast changes in potential, but is limited to small deflection angles.

Common representations of deflection plates are misleading. For one, the plates for one deflection axis are closer to the screen than the plates for the other. Plates that are closer together provide better sensitivity, but they also need to extend far enough along the CRT's axis to obtain adequate sensitivity. (The longer the time a given electron spends in the field, the farther it's deflected.) However, closely spaced long plates would cause the beam to contact them before full amplitude deflection occurs, so the compromise shape has them relatively close together toward the cathode, and flared apart in a shallow vee toward the screen. They are not flat in any but quite-old CRTs!

The timebase is an electronic circuit that generates a ramp voltage. This is a voltage that changes continuously and linearly with time. When it reaches a predefined value the ramp is reset and settles to its starting value. When a trigger event is recognized, provided the reset process (holdoff) is complete, the ramp starts again. The timebase voltage usually drives the horizontal amplifier. Its effect is to sweep the screen end of the electron beam at a constant speed from left to right across the screen, then blank the beam and return its deflection voltages to the left, so to speak, in time to begin the next sweep. Typical sweep circuits can take significant time to reset; in some CROs, fast sweeps required more time to retrace than to sweep.

Meanwhile, the vertical amplifier is driven by an external voltage (the vertical input) that is taken from the circuit or experiment that is being measured. The amplifier has a very high input impedance, typically one megohm, so that it draws only a tiny current from the signal source. Attenuator probes reduce the current drawn even more. The amplifier drives the vertical deflection plates with a voltage that is proportional to the vertical input. Because the electrons have already been accelerated by typically 2kV (roughly), this amplifier also has to deliver almost a hundred volts, and this with a very wide bandwidth. The gain of the vertical amplifier can be adjusted to suit the amplitude of the input voltage. A positive input voltage bends the electron beam upwards, and a negative voltage bends it downwards, so that the vertical deflection at any part of the trace shows the value of the input at that time.

The response of any oscilloscope is much faster than that of mechanical measuring devices such as the multimeter, where the inertia of the pointer (and perhaps damping) slows down its response to the input.

Observing high speed signals, especially non-repetitive signals, with a conventional CRO is difficult, due to non-stable or changing triggering threshold which makes it hard to "freeze" the waveform on the screen. This often requires the room to be darkened or a special viewing hood to be placed over the face of the display tube. To aid in viewing such signals, special oscilloscopes have borrowed from night vision technology, employing a microchannel plate electron multiplier behind the tube face to amplify faint beam currents.

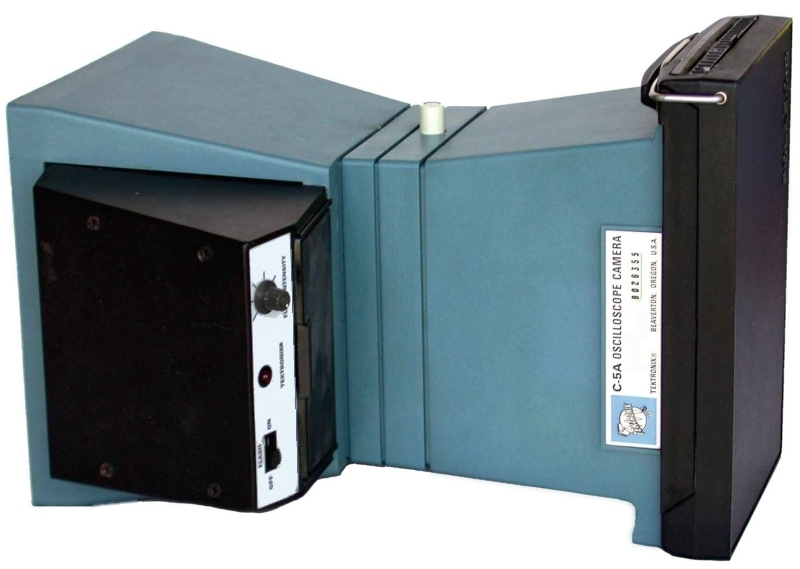
Tektronix Model C-5A Oscilloscope Camera with Polaroid instant film pack back.

Although a CRO allows one to view a signal, in its basic form it has no means of recording that signal on paper for the purpose of documentation. Therefore, special oscilloscope cameras were developed to photograph the screen directly. Early cameras used roll or plate film, while in the 1970s Polaroid instant cameras became popular. A P11 CRT phosphor (visually blue) was especially effective in exposing film. Cameras (sometimes using single sweeps) were used to capture faint traces.

The power supply is an important component of the oscilloscope. It provides low voltages to power the cathode heater in the tube (isolated for high voltage!), and the vertical and horizontal amplifiers as well as the trigger and sweep circuits. Higher voltages are needed to drive the electrostatic deflection plates, which means that the output stage of the vertical deflection amplifier has to develop large signal swings. These voltages must be very stable, and amplifier gain must be correspondingly stable. Any significant variations will cause errors in the size of the trace, making the oscilloscope inaccurate.

Later analog oscilloscopes added digital processing to the standard design. The same basic architecture — cathode ray tube, vertical and horizontal amplifiers — was retained, but the electron beam was controlled by digital circuitry that could display graphics and text mixed with the analog waveforms. Display time for those was interleaved — multiplexed — with waveform display in basically much the same way that a dual/multitrace oscilloscope displays its channels. The extra features that this system provides include:

- on-screen display of amplifier and timebase settings;
- voltage cursors — adjustable horizontal lines with voltage display;
- time cursors — adjustable vertical lines with time display;
- on-screen menus for trigger settings and other functions.
- automatic measurement of voltage and frequency of a displayed trace

=== Dual-beam oscilloscope ===
A dual-beam oscilloscope was a type of oscilloscope once used to compare one signal with another. There were two beams produced in a special type of CRT.

Unlike an ordinary "dual-trace" oscilloscope (which time-shared a single electron beam, thus losing about 50% of each signal), a dual-beam oscilloscope simultaneously produced two separate electron beams, capturing the entirety of both signals. One type (Cossor, UK) had a beam-splitter plate in its CRT, and single-ended vertical deflection following the splitter. (More about this type of oscilloscope appears near the end of this article.)

Other dual-beam oscilloscopes had two complete electron guns, requiring tight control of axial (rotational) mechanical alignment in manufacturing the CRT. In the latter type, two independent pairs of vertical plates deflect the beams. Vertical plates for channel A had no effect on channel B's beam. Similarly for channel B, separate vertical plates existed which deflected the B beam only.

On some dual-beam oscilloscopes the time base, horizontal plates and horizontal amplifier were common to both beams (the beam-splitter CRT worked this way). More elaborate oscilloscopes like the Tektronix 556 and 7844 could employ two independent time bases and two sets of horizontal plates and horizontal amplifiers. Thus one could look at a very fast signal on one beam and a slow signal on another beam.

Most multichannel oscilloscopes do not have multiple electron beams. Instead, they display only one trace at a time, but switch the later stages of the vertical amplifier between one channel and the other either on alternate sweeps (ALT mode) or many times per sweep (CHOP mode). Very few true dual-beam oscilloscopes were built.

With the advent of digital signal capture, true dual-beam oscilloscopes became obsolete, as it was then possible to display two truly simultaneous signals from memory using either the ALT or CHOP display technique, or even possibly a raster display mode.

== Analog storage oscilloscope ==
Trace storage is an extra feature available on some analog oscilloscopes; they used direct-view storage CRTs. Storage allows the trace pattern that normally decays in a fraction of a second to remain on the screen for several minutes or longer. An electrical circuit can then be deliberately activated to store and erase the trace on the screen.

The storage is accomplished using the principle of secondary emission. When the ordinary writing electron beam passes a point on the phosphor surface, not only does it momentarily cause the phosphor to illuminate, but the kinetic energy of the electron beam knocks other electrons loose from the phosphor surface. This can leave a net positive charge. Storage oscilloscopes then provide one or more secondary electron guns (called the "flood guns") that provide a steady flood of low-energy electrons traveling towards the phosphor screen. Flood guns cover the entire screen, ideally uniformly. The electrons from the flood guns are more strongly drawn to the areas of the phosphor screen where the writing gun has left a net positive charge; in this way, the electrons from the flood guns re-illuminate the phosphor in these positively charged areas of the phosphor screen.

If the energy of the flood gun electrons is properly balanced, each impinging flood gun electron knocks out one secondary electron from the phosphor screen, thus preserving the net positive charge in the illuminated areas of the phosphor screen. In this way, the image originally written by the writing gun can be maintained for a long time — many seconds to a few minutes. Eventually, small imbalances in the secondary emission ratio cause the entire screen to "fade positive" (light up) or cause the originally written trace to "fade negative" (extinguish). It is these imbalances that limit the ultimate storage time possible.

Storage oscilloscopes (and large-screen storage CRT displays) of this type, with storage at the phosphor, were made by Tektronix. Other companies, notably Hughes, earlier made storage oscilloscopes with a more-elaborate and costly internal storage structure.

Some oscilloscopes used a strictly binary (on/off) form of storage known as "bistable storage". Others permitted a constant series of short, incomplete erasure cycles which created the impression of a phosphor with "variable persistence". Certain oscilloscopes also allowed the partial or complete shutdown of the flood guns, allowing the preservation (albeit invisibly) of the latent stored image for later viewing. (Fading positive or fading negative only occurs when the flood guns are "on"; with the flood guns off, only leakage of the charges on the phosphor screen degrades the stored image.

== Analog sampling oscilloscope ==
The principle of sampling was developed during the 1930s in Bell Laboratories by Nyquist, after whom the sampling theorem is named. The first sampling oscilloscope was, however, developed in the late 1950s at the Atomic Energy Research Establishment at Harwell in England by G.B.B. Chaplin, A.R. Owens and A.J. Cole. ["A Sensitive Transistor Oscillograph With DC to 300 Mc/s Response", Proc I.E.E. (London) Vol.106, Part B. Suppl., No. 16, 1959].

The first sampling oscilloscope was an analog instrument, originally developed as a front-end unit for a conventional oscilloscope. The need for this instrument grew out of the requirement of nuclear scientists at Harwell to capture the waveform of very fast repetitive pulses. The current state-of-the-art oscilloscopes — with bandwidths of typically 20 MHz — were not able to do this and the 300 MHz effective bandwidth of their analog sampling oscilloscope represented a considerable advance.

A short series of these "front-ends" was made at Harwell and found much use, and Chaplin et al. patented the invention. Commercial exploitation of this patent was ultimately done by the Hewlett-Packard Company (later Agilent Technologies).

Sampling oscilloscopes achieve their large bandwidths by not taking the entire signal at a time. Instead, only a sample of the signal is taken. The samples are then assembled to create the waveform. This method can only work for repetitive signals, not transient events. The idea of sampling can be thought of as a stroboscopic technique. When using a strobe light, only pieces of the motion are seen, but when enough of these images are taken, the overall motion can be captured

== Related instruments ==
A large number of instruments used in a variety of technical fields are really oscilloscopes with inputs, calibration, controls, display calibration, etc., specialized and optimized for a particular application. In some cases additional functions such as a signal generator are built into the instrument to facilitate measurements that would otherwise require one or more additional instruments.

The waveform monitor in television broadcast engineering is very close to a standard oscilloscope, but it includes triggering circuits and controls that allow a stable display of a composite video frame, field, or even a selected line out of a field. Robert Hartwig explains the waveform monitor as "providing a graphic display of the black-and-white portion of the picture." The black-and-white portion of the video signal is called the "luminance" due to its fluorescent complexion. The waveform monitor's display of black vs. white levels allows the engineer to troubleshoot the quality of the picture and be certain that it is within the required standards. For convenience, the vertical scale of the waveform monitor is calibrated in IRE units.

== See also ==
- Mechanical oscilloscopes
