= Both respirator =

Negative pressure respiration device

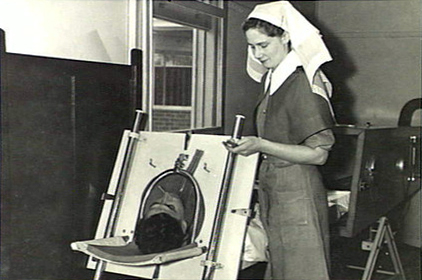
A Both cabinet respirator being used to treat a patient at the 110th Australian Military Hospital in 1943

The Both respirator, also known as the Both Portable Cabinet Respirator or Both Cabinet Respirator, was a negative pressure ventilator (more commonly known as an "iron lung") invented by Australian inventor Edward Both in 1937. Made from plywood, the respirator was an affordable alternative to the more expensive designs that had been used prior to its development, and accordingly came into common usage in Australia. More widespread use emerged during the 1940s and 1950s, when the Both respirator was offered free of charge to Commonwealth hospitals by William Morris.

== Development ==
In 1937, Australia faced a poliomyelitis (polio) epidemic. At the time, iron lungs provided one of the main methods of treating the "paralytic breathing failures" that were a complication of the illness. Although tank respirators had been developed earlier, the iron lung itself was still fairly new, having been designed by Philip Drinker and Louis Agassiz Shaw in 1928. Their design, which became known as a "Drinker's" or, due to its construction, an "iron lung", proved to be an effective means of prolonging the life of patients with poliomyelitis – although the first person to be treated in the ventilator died after two days from cardiac failure possibly related to pneumonia, the second patient recovered after spending two weeks in the machine. However in Australia, the widespread use of the Drinkers was hampered by a number of factors, most notably cost, the heavy weight of the device, and the need to ship the device to the United States for servicing, and thus there were few of the devices in the country.

Adelaide inventor Edward Both was approached in the hope that he could provide an alternative to meet the demand brought on by the epidemic. Both ran Both Equipment Limited with his brother Donald, and had previously developed medical apparatus. It took a few weeks for the pair to create their own iron lung, which they named the "Both portable cabinet respirator". Unlike the Drinker's machine, the Both respirator was made from plywood (even though it continued to be referred to as an "iron" lung), and this both kept the price down and made it more portable. The Both device cost only £100, was portable due to its light weight and the addition of wheels, and was simple enough that hospitals could build their own in their workshops, and it soon proved to be a success. The portability also opened up other possibilities, and as a result people who needed extended assistance from the device were able to use one in their private residences: indeed, in 2003 there were still five privately owned Both respirators being used in residences within Victoria.

== Both and Nuffield ==
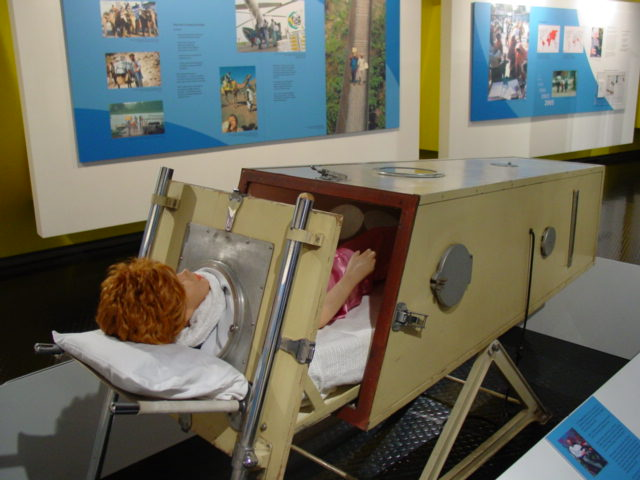
A Both respirator on display at the National Museum of Australia

In 1938, Edward Both traveled to England to sell an electrocardiograph which he had invented. While there, he heard over BBC Radio a request for an iron lung to help treat a young patient residing in a country hospital. Responding to the call, Both hired a workshop and assembled one of his designs within 24 hours, and the Both respirator was able to quickly gain the approval of the London County Council. Subsequently, he built more of the respirators during his stay, and one was sent to the Nuffield Department of Anaesthetics at the Radcliffe Infirmary where a short film was made of the device. This film was subsequently shown to William Morris (Lord Nuffield) by Robert Macintosh, the department's Professor. Nuffield was the manufacturer of the Morris motor car as well as a philanthropist.

Nuffield was taken by the design, and in November of that year he offered to turn over part of his car factory for the manufacture of the Both respirators and to provide the respirators free of charge to any hospital in the Commonwealth that requested one. In spite of some initial opposition – Nuffield was criticized in the British Medical Journal by Frederick Menzies for using a design before the iron lung had been perfected, and for supplying it to hospitals which may lack the knowledge as to how to employ it – over 1,700 Both–Nuffield respirators were distributed to hospitals. By the early 1950s there were over 700 Both–Nuffield iron lungs in the United Kingdom, compared with only 50 Drinker's models.
