= Christiaan Kok =

Zimbabwean cricketer (born 1971)

Personal information
- Full name: Christiaan Boyce Kok
- Born: 2 October 1971 (age 55); Gatooma, Mashonaland, Zimbabwe
- Batting: Right-handed
- Role: Wicket-keeper

Domestic team information
- Years: Team
- 1995/96: Young Mashonaland
- 1997/98–1998/99: Zimbabwe Country Districts
- Source: CricketArchive, 5 May 2016

Christiaan Boyce Kok (born 2 October 1971) is a Zimbabwean first-class cricketer who played for Young Mashonaland cricket team. He is right-handed wicket-keeper batsman He was born at Gatooma in 1971.
