= Hans-Werner Bothe =

German philosopher (born 1952)

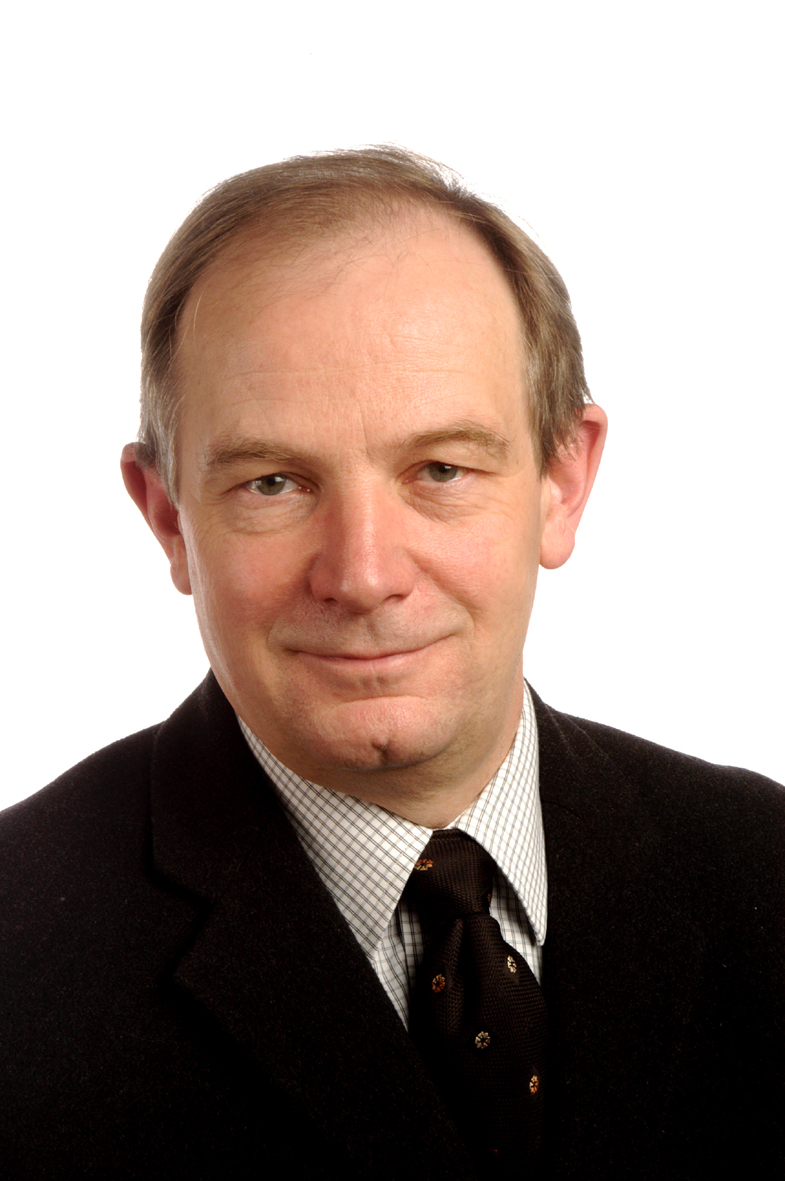
- Born: 23 September 1952; Langelsheim, West Germany
- Education: University of Tübingen; University of Mainz
- Known for: Neurobionics; Philosophy of Mind
- Scientific career
- Fields: Neurosurgery; Philosophy
- Workplaces: Max-Planck-Institute Cologne; Medical School Hanover; University of Münster

Hans-Werner Bothe (born 23 September 1952) is a German philosopher and neurosurgeon working in the field of Neurobionics.

== Life ==
Bothe studied Philosophy and Medicine from 1973 until 1981 in Tübingen und Mainz, graduated 1978 in Philosophy with Magister Artium, later working for three years at the Max-Planck-Institute for Neurological Research in Cologne. He received his PhD in 1983 (thesis: Artificial Brain Abscess in Cats and Therapy with Antibiotics and Steroids).

He specialized in Neurosurgery and completed his residency training at Johannes Gutenberg-University in Mainz. After achieving habilitation in 1991 he taught at Hanover Medical School and worked together with Madjid Samii at Nordstadt Hospital in Hanover. In 1993 he obtained a tenured professor for Neurosurgery at Westfälische Wilhelms-University in Münster.

In 1992, Bothe organized the 1st International Workshop on Neurobionics, a field aimed at the substitution of impaired functions of brain and spinal cord by neurosurgical implantation of microelectronic systems. For that purpose, he brought together an international consortium of scientists covering for mathematics, neuroinformatics, biological basic research, microsystems, and medicine.

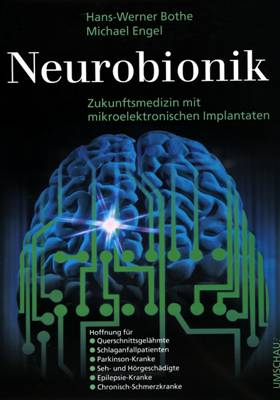

In 1991 he launched the International Neurobionics Foundation together with Daniel Goeudevert, Madjid Samii, and other representatives of science, industry, and policy. From 1991 until 1995 he managed the foundation as executive director of the board. He developed microelectronic implants to treat blind patients with damaged retina (with B. Fischer, J.W. Bartha, et al.), microelectronic therapy to manage urinary incontinence (with B. von Heyden), and paraplegia (with J. Holsheimer).

Alterations of personality traits (antisocial behaviour concomitant to impaired moral decision making) observable after deep brain stimulation of the subthalamic nucleus (for therapy of Parkinsonian patients) brought him to be engaged in the problem of determinism and free will from both the perspective of neuroscience, and philosophy of mind: He accounts for the conviction that there is merely limited causality on the relationship between activity of the brain and phenomenological events of the 1st person perspective due to non-linearity of cerebral information processing and supported logically by Gödel's incompleteness theorems.

== Publications ==
- Neurobionik - Zukunftsmedizin mit mikroelektronischen Implantaten (in German), Umschau, Frankfurt, 1998 (with M. Engel)
- Visual field with a resolution of 64 points by selective stimulation of the optic nerve, Zentralbl Neurochir, Suppl 1, 2001 (with B. Fischer and A. Brentrup)
- Transverse tripolar spinal cord stimulation, Neuromodulation 9, 2006 (with J.C. Oakley and F. Espinosa)
