= Jan Dirksz Both =

17th-century Dutch painter

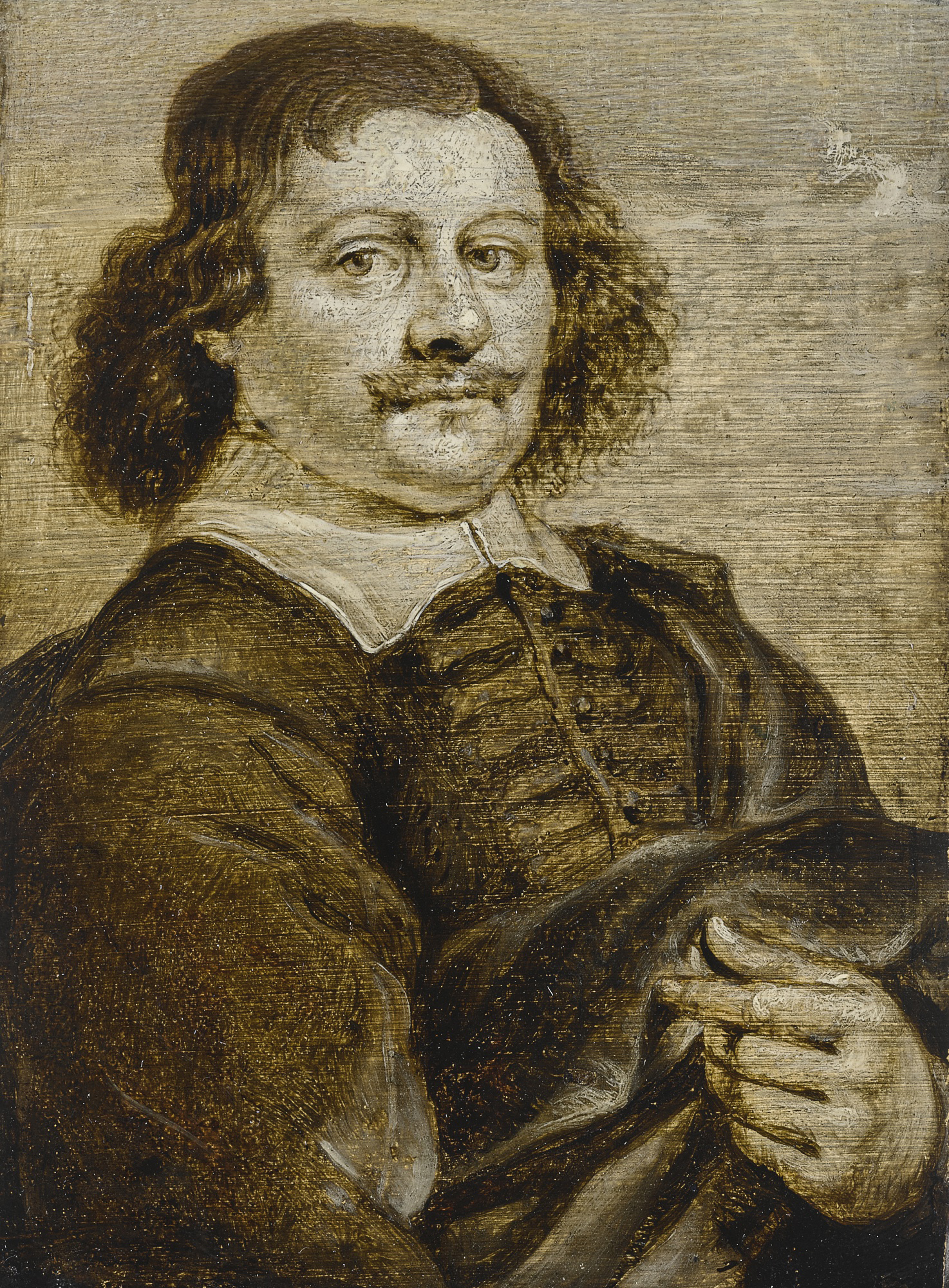
Jan Both (1668)

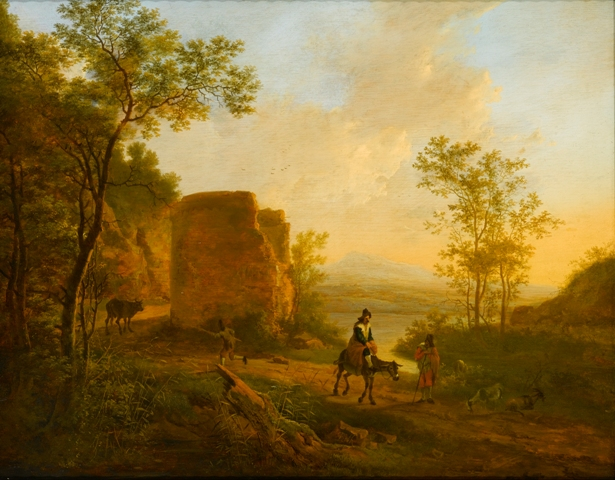
Both A Southern Landscape with a Ruin, oil on panel.

Jan Dirksz Both (between 1610 and 1618 - August 9, 1652) was a Dutch painter, draughtsman, and etcher, who made an important contribution to the development of Dutch Italianate landscape painting.

== Biography ==
Both was born in Utrecht, and was the brother of Andries Both. According to Houbraken, the brothers first learned to paint from their father, who was a glass-painter or glazier there. Later Jan was a pupil of Abraham Bloemaert and still later the brothers traveled together to Rome via France. Gerrit van Honthorst has also been suggested as a teacher.

By 1638 Jan and his brother Andries were in Rome where Andries concentrated on genre works in the manner of Pieter van Laer, while Jan concentrated on landscapes in the manner of Claude Lorrain. In 1639 Jan collaborated with Herman van Swanevelt and Claude Lorrain on a project for the Buen Retiro Palace in Madrid. Certainly by 1646 Jan had returned to Utrecht, where he refined further his expansive, imaginary landscapes drenched with a Mediterranean golden light. In Landscape with Bandits Leading Prisoners (Museum of Fine Arts, Boston) the sandy road makes a sweeping diagonal from the left. Touches of realism in the down-to-earth figures and detailed vegetation of the foreground contrast with the idyllic golden distance. Occasionally Both peoples his landscapes with religious or mythological figures as in Judgement of Paris (London, National Gallery) where the figures were painted by a fellow Utrecht artist, Cornelis van Poelenburch. Jan's brother Andries (c.1612–41), who specialised in peasant scenes, died in Venice as they were returning to Utrecht. Both brothers are registered as Bentvueghels, but their nicknames are not known. Jan's pupils were Barend Bispinck, Willem de Heusch, and Hendrick Verschuring. Jan Both died in his native city of Utrecht.

== Public collections ==
Both is represented in the following collections: Fitzwilliam Museum at the University of Cambridge, UK; Hermitage, St. Petersburg, Russia; Kunsthistorisches Museum, Vienna; Louvre, Paris; Mauritshuis Royal Picture Gallery, The Hague; Museum of Fine Arts, Boston; National Gallery of Art, Washington D.C.; National Gallery of Canada, Ottawa; National Gallery, London; Rijksmuseum, Amsterdam; Royal Collection, London; Art Gallery of Greater Victoria, British Columbia; Art Gallery of the University of Rochester, New York; Ashmolean Museum, University of Oxford; Christchurch Art Gallery Te Puna o Waiwhetu, New Zealand; Courtauld Institute of Art, London; Dulwich Picture Gallery, London; National Museum of Western Art, Tokyo; Norwich Museums, UK; Prado Museum, Madrid; Spencer Museum of Art at the University of Kansas; The Wallace Collection, London; Vejle Kunstmuseum, Denmark; and Nasjonalmuseet, Norway amongst others.

== Gallery ==
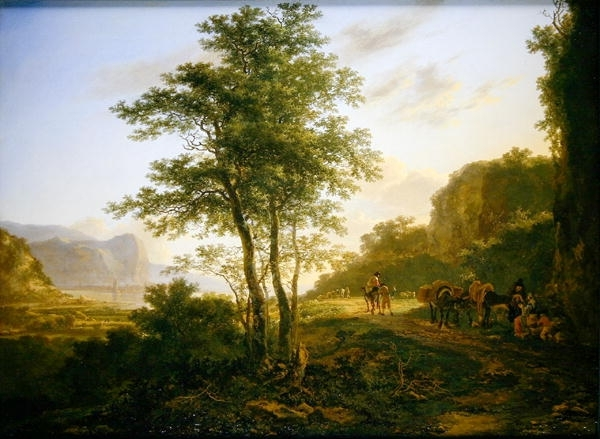
Landscape chiaroscuro, Jan Both
