= Christiaan Both =

Dutch sports shooter

Personal information
- Born: 2 October 1895 Breda, Netherlands
- Died: 11 October 1977 (aged 82) Etten-Leur, Netherlands

Sport
- Sport: Sports shooting

Christiaan Both (2 October 1895 – 11 October 1977) was a Dutch sports shooter. He competed at the 1936 Summer Olympics and 1948 Summer Olympics.
