= Christiaan Monden =

Dutch sociologist

Christiaan Willem Simon Monden (born 26 March 1975 in Noordwijkerhout) is a Dutch sociologist and a professorial fellow in sociology at Nuffield College, University of Oxford. Monden has research interests in family sociology; social demography; social inequalities; social variations in health and mortality.

Monden is director of graduate studies at Nuffield College.

With Jeroen Smits, Monden established a database of twins for 76 developing countries that contains information on around 2.5 million births by 1.4 million women.

== Selected publications ==
- "Divorce and subsequent increase in uptake of antidepressant medication: a Finnish registry-based study on couple versus individual effects" (with Niina Metsä-Simola, Saska Saarioja and Pekka Martikainen) BMC Public Health, 2015 2015, 15:158.
- "Length of life inequality around the globe" (with Jeroen Smits) Social Science & Medicine, 2009, 68 (6), 1114-1123.
- "Are the negative effects of divorce on well-being dependent on marital quality?" (with Matthijs Kalmijn) Journal of Marriage and Family, 2006, 68 (5), 1197-1213.
- "Partner's and own education: does who you live with matter for self-assessed health, smoking and excessive alcohol consumption?" (with Frank van Lenthe, Nan Dirk de Graaf and Gerbert Kraaykamp) Social Science & Medicine, 2003, 57 (10) 1901-1912.
