= Theo Botha =

South African activist

Theophilous James Bennett Botha
- Born: 1 March 1960 (age 66)
- Occupation: self-employed

Theophilous James Bennett "Theo" Botha (born 1 March 1960) is a South African shareholder activist. He has queried many companies in the area of good corporate governance, ethics, executive compensation, environmental practices and Black Economic Empowerment. He has also criticized South African corporate governance guidelines as too lenient.

Theo Botha first decided to pursue shareholder activism after an investment in a small life insurance company (The Sage Group). The company was making huge losses in the United States that it refused to disclose to the South African shareholders.

In a press interview it was found that "Botha doesn’t appear to be making money off this enterprise; in most instances he buys only one share."

== Activism ==
Botha's usual approach is not unlike his first encounter with Sage in which all he did was pose a few questions which usually make the companies in question edgy. He spends time going through company financial reports to note discrepancies which he will use to compile his questions which he asks during company AGM's.

The South African companies Botha has confronted include The Sage Group, Sappi,Absa, Sasol, SABMiller, Pick n Pay Stores, Tiger Brands, Avusa, Anglo Platinum, Pretoria Portland Cement Company, Mutual & Federal, Bidvest, Wesizwe Platinum, and Liberty Holdings Limited.
