= Christiaan Both (ecologist) =

Dutch ecologist (born 1969)

Christiaan Both (born 12 December 1969) is a Dutch Associate professor of ecology at the University of Groningen.

== Early life ==
Christiaan Both was born in the Netherlands in 1969. From 1988 to 1993 he studied in various universities including Groningen, Oxford and Wageningen. In 1998 he graduated with a Ph.D. from the Netherlands Institute of Ecology and since that time worked as a postdoctoral researcher at Groningen, Bangor universities as well as University of California, Santa Cruz. In 2004 he joined Animal Ecology Group, a division of Groningen and three years later became Netherlands Organisation for Scientific Research's fellow.

== Career ==
Christiaan Both studied density-dependent reproduction during his PhD, where he aimed to understand why birds lay smaller clutches when competition increased. This work was both using long-term data from hole-breeding passerines, and also experimental. It showed that great tit clutch size is causally affected by local density, and that the density dependent response could be explained by an optimal response of individuals to the level of competition for food during the nestling phase.

From 1998 Christiaan Both, Niels Dingemanse, Piet Drent and Joost Tinbergen have studied great tits' exploration and showed that this variation in personality traits is heritable. They were interested in how such variation with a heritable component could be maintained over evolutionary time, and therefore studied fitness consequences for three years in a wild population of great tits. The selection fluctuated between years, between the sexes and pair-combinations of personality were found to be important

Since 2001 Christiaan mostly worked on the effects of climate change on trophic interactions, with an emphasis on changes phenology. Together with Marcel Visser he showed that climate change resulted in an insufficient response in timing of migration and egg-laying in the long-distance migratory pied flycatcher, and that local populations declined as a result of increased asynchrony between breeding time and the date of the local food peak. He is mostly interested in how different organisms can respond with different mechanisms and speeds to the high rates of current climate change, and the consequences this has for trophic interactions.
